= List of Serbian football transfers winter 2015–16 =

- This is a list of transfers in Serbian football for the 2015-16 winter transfer window.
- Only moves featuring a Serbian SuperLiga side are listed.
- The order by which the clubs are listed is equal to the classification at the mid-season of the 2015–16 Serbian SuperLiga.

== Serbian SuperLiga ==
=== Red Star Belgrade ===
In: Note: Flags indicate national team as defined under FIFA eligibility rules; some limited exceptions apply. Players may hold more than one non-FIFA nationality.

No.	Pos.	Nation	Player
23	FW	ANT	Josh Parker (loan return from (Scotland) Aberdeen)
8	MF	SRB	Marko Grujić (on loan from, previously sold to (England) Liverpool)
20	MF	NED	Mitchell Donald (was on loan, now signed from (Russia) Mordovia)
18	MF	MKD	David Babunski (from (Spain) Barcelona B)
4	MF	FRA	Damien Le Tallec (from (Russia) Mordovia)
5	DF	BRA	Edson Silva (from (Brazil) São Paulo)
—	FW	SRB	Petar Milić (from Bežanija)
6	MF	SRB	Uroš Račić (from OFK Beograd)
—	FW	SRB	Momčilo Krstić (from Voždovac)

Out: Note: Flags indicate national team as defined under FIFA eligibility rules; some limited exceptions apply. Players may hold more than one non-FIFA nationality.

No.	Pos.	Nation	Player
—	FW	SRB	Đorđe Despotović (to (Latvia) Spartaks Jūrmala)
94	MF	MNE	Vladimir Jovović (on loan to OFK Beograd)
16	DF	SEN	Mamadou Mbodj (to (Lithuania) Žalgiris)
15	MF	BRA	Bruno Matos (on loan to Novi Pazar)
18	MF	SRB	Nemanja Ahčin (on loan to Novi Pazar)
9	FW	SRB	Luka Jović (to (Portugal) Benfica)
41	GK	SRB	Jovan Vićić (on loan to Loznica, was on loan at GSP Polet)
—	DF	SRB	Nemanja Tošić (to Sinđelić Beograd, was on loan at IM Rakovica)
—	DF	SRB	Nenad Cvetković (to Zemun, was on loan at Radnički Beograd)
—	DF	SRB	Marko Marinković (on loan to BSK Borča, was on loan at Spartak Subotica)
—	MF	SRB	Dušan Živković (on loan to Bežanija, was on loan at Spartak Subotica)
21	DF	SRB	Marko Mijailović (on loan to Bežanija)
40	MF	SRB	Lazar Tufegdžić (on loan to Bežanija)
31	GK	SRB	Marko Trkulja (on loan to Zemun)
6	DF	SRB	Vukašin Jovanović (to (Russia) Zenit)
11	MF	ISR	Idan Vered (to (Canada) Ottawa Fury)
—	MF	SRB	Lazar Mitrović (to BSK Borča, was on loan at Spartak Subotica)
—	DF	SRB	Marko Žikić (to Jagodina, was on loan at Lokomotiva Beograd)
—	FW	MNE	Miloš Vukić (on loan to Grafičar Beograd)

=== Čukarički ===
In: Note: Flags indicate national team as defined under FIFA eligibility rules; some limited exceptions apply. Players may hold more than one non-FIFA nationality.

No.	Pos.	Nation	Player
—	FW	SRB	Nemanja Stanković (loan return from Lokomotiva Beograd)
28	FW	SRB	Nemanja Radonjić (on loan from (Italy) Roma)
44	MF	MNE	Dušan Lagator (from (Montenegro) Mladost Podgorica)
26	DF	SRB	Đorđe Đurić (on loan from (Montenegro) Rudar Pljevlja)
77	MF	SRB	Filip Knežević (from Partizan)
33	DF	SRB	Stefan Živković (from Borac Čačak)

Out: Note: Flags indicate national team as defined under FIFA eligibility rules; some limited exceptions apply. Players may hold more than one non-FIFA nationality.

No.	Pos.	Nation	Player
95	MF	SRB	Nikola Karaklajić (to (Czech Republic) Příbram B)
—	MF	SRB	Nikola Šakić (to Napredak Kruševac, was on loan at Kolubara)
14	DF	GHA	Lee Addy (released)
25	DF	MNE	Dejan Boljević (to (Uzbekistan) Nasaf)
5	DF	SRB	Marko Ranđelović (released)
59	DF	SRB	Nikola Vučetić (to Jagodina)
52	DF	MNE	Kostadin Mikić (to Partizan)
60	MF	SRB	Miloš Podunavac (to OFK Beograd)
15	FW	BIH	Budimir Šarčević (on loan to Sinđelić Beograd, was on loan at BASK)
27	MF	SRB	Đorđe Radovanović (to Sinđelić Beograd, was on loan at Zemun)

=== Borac Čačak ===
In: Note: Flags indicate national team as defined under FIFA eligibility rules; some limited exceptions apply. Players may hold more than one non-FIFA nationality.

No.	Pos.	Nation	Player
—	MF	SRB	Nemanja Kruševac (loan return from Sloboda Čačak)
13	MF	MNE	Boris Bulajić (from (Montenegro) Sutjeska Nikšić)
73	FW	SRB	Lazar Jovanović (from Mladost Lučani)
88	MF	SRB	Milorad Balabanović (from Bačka BP)
15	MF	SRB	Miroljub Kostić (from (Bosnia and Herzegovina) Sarajevo)
31	MF	SRB	Ivan Todorović (from Novi Pazar)
6	DF	SRB	Miloš Krstić (from Radnik Surdulica)
11	MF	BUL	Iliyan Yordanov (from (Bulgaria) Lokomotiv Plovdiv)
23	FW	SRB	Vuk Sotirović (from (Hong Kong) Hougang United)
17	DF	SRB	Mario Maslać (from (Croatia) Osijek)
24	GK	SRB	Saša Mišić (from Bežanija)
80	MF	SRB	Pavle Propadalo (free, last with Metalac G.M.)
16	MF	SRB	Milan Marčić (from (Portugal) Moreirense)
3	MF	SLE	Mustapha Bangura (from (Cyprus) Aris Limassol)
7	MF	BRA	Pedro Sass (from (Kazakhstan) Shakhter Karagandy)
94	MF	MNE	Aldin Adžović (from (Montenegro) Dečić)

Out: Note: Flags indicate national team as defined under FIFA eligibility rules; some limited exceptions apply. Players may hold more than one non-FIFA nationality.

No.	Pos.	Nation	Player
80	MF	SRB	Filip Knežević (loan return to Partizan)
5	MF	SRB	Miljan Mutavdžić (to Radnik Surdulica)
11	FW	SRB	Milan Jevtović (loan return to (Austria) LASK Linz)
14	FW	BIH	Uroš Đerić (to Mladost Lučani)
33	DF	SRB	Nemanja Miletić (to Vojvodina)
29	MF	SRB	Dušan Jovančić (to Vojvodina)
—	MF	SRB	Dušan Đorić (to Sloga Kraljevo, was on loan at Polet Ljubić)
—	FW	SRB	Uroš Nikolić (to Sloga Kraljevo)
21	MF	SRB	Branislav Tomić (on loan to Polet Ljubić)
1	GK	SRB	Marko Drobnjak (on loan to Polet Ljubić)
3	DF	SRB	Đorđe Lazović (to Polet Ljubić)
—	FW	SRB	Jovan Mihajlović (to Polet Ljubić, was on loan at Jedinstvo Putevi)
23	MF	SRB	Dušan Mićić (to Vojvodina)
—	FW	SRB	Ivan Berić (to Donji Srem)
28	DF	SRB	Stefan Živković (to Čukarički)
—	DF	SRB	Stefan Kurandić (loan extension to Sloga Kraljevo)
85	DF	SRB	Miljan Jablan (to (Lithuania) Sūduva)

=== Partizan ===
In: Note: Flags indicate national team as defined under FIFA eligibility rules; some limited exceptions apply. Players may hold more than one non-FIFA nationality.

No.	Pos.	Nation	Player
11	FW	CIV	Ismaël Béko Fofana (loan return from (China) Qingdao Jonoon)
23	DF	SRB	Marko Jovanović (from Voždovac)
50	GK	SRB	Bojan Šaranov (free, last with (Greece) Ergotelis)
7	FW	SRB	Nemanja Mihajlović (from Teleoptik)
5	DF	SRB	Miladin Stevanović (loan return from Teleoptik)
14	DF	SRB	Miroslav Bogosavac (loan return from Teleoptik)
25	MF	BRA	Everton Luiz (from (Switzerland) St. Gallen)
51	DF	CIV	Cèdric Gogoua (from (Finland) SJK)
61	GK	SRB	Marko Jovičić (from Teleoptik)
—	DF	MNE	Kostadin Mikić (from Čukarički, to youth team)

Out: Note: Flags indicate national team as defined under FIFA eligibility rules; some limited exceptions apply. Players may hold more than one non-FIFA nationality.

No.	Pos.	Nation	Player
14	MF	MNE	Petar Grbić (to (Turkey) Akhisar)
33	FW	SRB	Ivan Šaponjić (to (Portugal) Benfica B)
10	MF	SRB	Stefan Babović (released)
44	DF	BRA	Fabrício (loan return to (Brazil) Bragantino)
—	FW	SRB	Nenad Marinković (was on loan, now signed with Voždovac)
—	MF	BRA	Eliomar (was on loan, now signed with Javor Ivanjica)
—	DF	MKD	Stefan Aškovski (to (Turkey) Kayseri Erciyesspor, was on loan at Novi Pazar)
92	FW	SRB	Nikola Trujić (to Vojvodina)
11	MF	SRB	Nikola Ninković (to (Italy) Genoa)
5	DF	SRB	Nemanja Petrović (on loan to (Israel) Maccabi Netanya)
—	MF	SRB	Filip Knežević (to Čukarički, was on loan at Borac Čačak)
7	MF	SRB	Predrag Luka (to Mladost Lučani)
—	MF	SRB	Jovan Nišić (on loan to Teleoptik)
—	FW	SRB	Lazar Sajčić (to Jagodina, was on loan at Sinđelić Beograd)
—	DF	SRB	Stefan Grbović (loan extension to Teleoptik)
—	MF	MNE	Jovan Čađenović (loan extension to Teleoptik)
18	MF	SRB	Nemanja Glavčić (on loan to Teleoptik)
—	DF	SRB	Miloš Perišić (on loan to Teleoptik, was on loan at Sinđelić Beograd)
26	GK	SRB	Jovan Trnić (loan extension to Teleoptik)
—	MF	SRB	Nemanja Stanimirović (on loan to ČSK Čelarevo)
80	FW	SRB	Marko Golubović (on loan to Teleoptik)
31	DF	SRB	Nikola Milenković (loan extension to Teleoptik)
15	FW	CMR	Aboubakar Oumarou (to (China) Shenzhen)

=== Vojvodina ===
In: Note: Flags indicate national team as defined under FIFA eligibility rules; some limited exceptions apply. Players may hold more than one non-FIFA nationality.

No.	Pos.	Nation	Player
—	DF	SRB	Milan Stepanov (from (Bosnia and Herzegovina) Sarajevo)
7	MF	SRB	Dejan Meleg (from (Netherlands) Ajax)
23	DF	SRB	Milan Milinković (from Jagodina)
22	MF	SRB	Filip Malbašić (from (Germany) TSG Hoffenheim)
33	DF	SRB	Nemanja Miletić (from Borac Čačak)
29	MF	SRB	Dušan Jovančić (from Borac Čačak)
4	MF	SRB	Dušan Mićić (from Borac Čačak)
92	FW	SRB	Nikola Trujić (from Partizan)
9	FW	SRB	Nikola Ašćerić (from Radnički Niš)

Out: Note: Flags indicate national team as defined under FIFA eligibility rules; some limited exceptions apply. Players may hold more than one non-FIFA nationality.

No.	Pos.	Nation	Player
7	MF	SRB	Aleksandar Stanisavljević (to (Greece) Asteras Tripolis)
9	FW	SRB	Miljan Mrdaković (to (Greece) Agrotikos Asteras)
3	DF	BIH	Slaviša Radović (to (Bosnia and Herzegovina) Olimpic)
2	DF	SRB	Jovica Vasilić (to Novi Pazar)
22	MF	SRB	Marko Zoćević (to Mladost Lučani)
4	MF	SRB	Mirko Ivanić (to (Belarus) BATE Borisov)
—	FW	SRB	Lazar Veselinović (was on loan, now signed with (South Korea) Pohang Steelers)
23	MF	SRB	Marko Đurišić (on loan to Proleter Novi Sad)
29	FW	SRB	Saša Ćurko (on loan to Proleter Novi Sad)
—	DF	SRB	Milan Lazarević (to Proleter Novi Sad)
26	DF	SRB	Dominik Dinga (to (Russia) Ural Sverdlovsk Oblast)
51	FW	SRB	Ognjen Ožegović (to (China) Changchun Yatai)
—	GK	SRB	Emil Rockov (was on loan, now signed with Proleter Novi Sad)
—	MF	SRB	Aleksandar Desančić (was on loan, now signed with Proleter Novi Sad)
35	GK	SRB	Aleksa Slijepčević (to Subotica)

=== Radnički Niš ===
In: Note: Flags indicate national team as defined under FIFA eligibility rules; some limited exceptions apply. Players may hold more than one non-FIFA nationality.

No.	Pos.	Nation	Player
—	FW	SRB	Stefan Vukić (loan return from Bukovik Ražanj)
—	GK	SRB	Ivan Doderović (loan return from Bobište)
50	FW	SRB	Nikola Petković (loan return from Timočanin)
13	DF	SRB	Mladen Mitrović (loan return from Car Konstantin)
40	FW	SRB	Miodrag Todorović (loan return from Car Konstantin)
67	MF	SRB	Nikola Mitrović (loan return from Car Konstantin)
—	FW	SRB	Marko Branković (loan return from Car Konstantin)

Out: Note: Flags indicate national team as defined under FIFA eligibility rules; some limited exceptions apply. Players may hold more than one non-FIFA nationality.

No.	Pos.	Nation	Player
30	DF	SRB	Miloš Mijokov (released)
11	FW	SRB	Ivan Pejčić (released)
20	MF	KGZ	Anton Zemlianukhin (to (Thailand) Sisaket)
27	MF	SRB	Miloš Krstić (to Rad)
55	MF	SRB	Marko Blažić (to (Greece) Kalloni)
9	FW	SRB	Nikola Ašćerić (to Vojvodina)

=== Mladost Lučani ===
In: Note: Flags indicate national team as defined under FIFA eligibility rules; some limited exceptions apply. Players may hold more than one non-FIFA nationality.

No.	Pos.	Nation	Player
77	MF	SRB	Stevan Luković (from Napredak Kruševac)
16	FW	SRB	Bojan Čečarić (from Javor Ivanjica)
22	GK	SRB	Ognjen Čančarević (from OFK Beograd)
5	DF	BIH	Siniša Saničanin (from (Bosnia and Herzegovina) Borac Banja Luka)
14	MF	SRB	Marko Zoćević (from Vojvodina)
88	MF	SRB	Predrag Luka (from Partizan)
55	FW	BIH	Uroš Đerić (from Borac Čačak)
8	MF	SRB	Stefan Golubović (free)
13	DF	SRB	Darko Rakočević (from (Thailand) Songkhla United)
31		SRB	Predrag Bogdanović (from Smederevo 1924)

Out: Note: Flags indicate national team as defined under FIFA eligibility rules; some limited exceptions apply. Players may hold more than one non-FIFA nationality.

No.	Pos.	Nation	Player
—	MF	SRB	Milan Radin (to Voždovac)
91	GK	MNE	Nemanja Jevrić (to Voždovac)
14	DF	SRB	Milan Jagodić (to Zemun)
13	MF	SRB	Nemanja Milovanović (to BSK Borča)
8	MF	SRB	Aleksandar Alempijević (to (Uzbekistan) Bunyodkor)
32	FW	SRB	Lazar Jovanović (to Borac Čačak)
45	FW	SRB	Miloš Džugurdić (to BSK Borča)
31	MF	SRB	Miloš Mijić (to Metalac GM)
—		SRB	Stefan Ristović (on loan to Sloga Požega)
5	DF	SRB	Vladimir Golemić (to (Switzerland) Chiasso)
4	DF	SRB	Miloš Ristić (to Sloga Požega, was on loan at Železničar Lajkovac)
—	GK	SRB	Bojan Tanasijević (to Turbina Vreoci)

=== Javor Ivanjica ===
In: Note: Flags indicate national team as defined under FIFA eligibility rules; some limited exceptions apply. Players may hold more than one non-FIFA nationality.

No.	Pos.	Nation	Player
31	FW	SRB	Andrija Ratković (loan return from Sloga Požega)
13	MF	SRB	Nemanja Živković (loan return from Loznica)
4	MF	SRB	Mladen Mićanović (loan return from IMT)
—	MF	SRB	Nikola Vasilić (loan return from Budućnost Arilje)
—	FW	SRB	Vujica Luković (loan return from Budućnost Arilje)
24	DF	MKD	Aleksa Amanović (from IMT)
25	DF	SRB	Nikola Bjelanović (from Lokomotiva Beograd)
22	FW	SRB	Aleksandar Dimitrić (from Inđija)
7	MF	BRA	Eliomar (was on loan, now signed from Partizan)
23	GK	SRB	Petar Glintić (from Sloga Požega)
—	MF	BRA	Felipe Ferreira (from (Brazil) Grêmio)
32	FW	NGR	Obinna Tochukwu (free)

Out: Note: Flags indicate national team as defined under FIFA eligibility rules; some limited exceptions apply. Players may hold more than one non-FIFA nationality.

No.	Pos.	Nation	Player
16	FW	SRB	Bojan Čečarić (to Mladost Lučani)
4	DF	SRB	Nikola Mitrović (to IMT)
—	GK	SRB	Nemanja Jeveričić (to Sloga Požega, was on loan at Budućnost Arilje)
—	MF	SRB	Dejan Savkov (on loan to Sloga Požega, was on loan at Sloga Bajina Bašta)
—	MF	SRB	Filip Lakićević (on loan to Sloga Požega, was on loan at Lokomotiva Beograd)
23	GK	SRB	Marko Knežević (released)
—	MF	SRB	Sadin Smajović (to (Singapore) Balestier Khalsa, was on loan at Šumadija 1903)

=== Voždovac ===
In: Note: Flags indicate national team as defined under FIFA eligibility rules; some limited exceptions apply. Players may hold more than one non-FIFA nationality.

No.	Pos.	Nation	Player
12	GK	MNE	Nemanja Jevrić (from Mladost Lučani)
13	DF	SRB	Vladimir Jašić (from (Canada) London City)
77	DF	BIH	Bojan Puzigaća (from (Bosnia and Herzegovina) Sarajevo)
15	FW	SRB	Nenad Marinković (was on loan, now signed from Partizan)
20	FW	SRB	Jovan Damjanović (from Novi Pazar)
29	MF	SRB	Milan Radin (from Mladost Lučani)
17	MF	SRB	Ognjen Krasić (from (Kazakhstan) Tobol)

Out: Note: Flags indicate national team as defined under FIFA eligibility rules; some limited exceptions apply. Players may hold more than one non-FIFA nationality.

No.	Pos.	Nation	Player
7	MF	SRB	Nikola Beljić (to (Greece) Acharnaikos)
27	DF	SRB	Marko Jovanović (to Partizan)
77	DF	SRB	Nemanja Zlatković (to Novi Pazar)
—	DF	SRB	Danijel Stojković (to OFK Beograd, was on loan at BSK Borča)
17	DF	BIH	Petar Jovanović (to Rad)
24	FW	SRB	Momčilo Krstić (to Red Star Belgrade)
—	DF	SRB	Predrag Stanimirović (was on loan, now signed with Sinđelić Beograd)
20	MF	SRB	Nenad Stanković (to Sinđelić Beograd)
—	MF	SRB	Ivan Tapušković (to OFK Beograd)
8	MF	SRB	Risto Ristović (to (Kazakhstan) Okzhetpes)

=== Radnik Surdulica ===
In: Note: Flags indicate national team as defined under FIFA eligibility rules; some limited exceptions apply. Players may hold more than one non-FIFA nationality.

No.	Pos.	Nation	Player
77	MF	SRB	Miloš Deletić (from Jagodina)
—	MF	SRB	Bojan Čukić (loan return from Sloga PM)
6	DF	SRB	Miloš Simonović (on loan from Napredak Kruševac)
9	MF	SRB	Marko Vučetić (from Inđija)
18	DF	SRB	Stefan Radovanović (from Dinamo Vranje)
4	DF	SRB	Slobodan Vuković (from Novi Pazar)
22	MF	SRB	Miljan Mutavdžić (from Borac Čačak)

Out: Note: Flags indicate national team as defined under FIFA eligibility rules; some limited exceptions apply. Players may hold more than one non-FIFA nationality.

No.	Pos.	Nation	Player
5	DF	SRB	Ljubo Baranin (to (Malaysia) Kuantan FA)
24	MF	SRB	Milan Ćulum (to Rad)
21	MF	SRB	Predrag Lazić (to Kolubara)
22	DF	SRB	Vukašin Tomić (to Spartak Subotica)
9	MF	SRB	Uroš Mirković (to (Bosnia and Herzegovina) Krupa)
2	DF	SRB	Predrag Đorđević (to Jagodina)
6	DF	SRB	Miloš Krstić (to Borac Čačak)
18	MF	SRB	Petar Stamatović (to Smederevo 1924)

=== Metalac G.M. ===
In: Note: Flags indicate national team as defined under FIFA eligibility rules; some limited exceptions apply. Players may hold more than one non-FIFA nationality.

No.	Pos.	Nation	Player
17	MF	SRB	Srđan Simović (free, last with Javor Ivanjica)
18	MF	SRB	Miloš Mijić (from Mladost Lučani)
24	MF	SRB	Milan Stojanović (from (Bosnia and Herzegovina) Borac Banja Luka)
99	FW	ECU	Walberto Caicedo (from (Ecuador) Emelec)
21	MF	MNE	Uroš Delić (from (Sweden) AFC United)
30	FW	CRO	Ante Mitrović (from (Croatia) HNK Gorica)

Out: Note: Flags indicate national team as defined under FIFA eligibility rules; some limited exceptions apply. Players may hold more than one non-FIFA nationality.

No.	Pos.	Nation	Player
24	FW	SRB	Dejan Đenić (to (Montenegro) Bokelj)
—	FW	SRB	Božidar Šobat (released, was on loan at Karađorđe Topola)
—	FW	SRB	Stefan Milošević (released, was on loan at Sloga Kraljevo)
17	MF	SRB	Nikola Minić (to Takovo)
18	FW	SUI	Milan Basrak (released)
21	MF	SRB	Stefan Bukorac (to (Cyprus) Enosis Neon Paralimni)
4	MF	SRB	Goran Brkić (to Zemun)
—	DF	SRB	Nikola Todorić (on loan to Sloga Kraljevo)

=== Novi Pazar ===
In: Note: Flags indicate national team as defined under FIFA eligibility rules; some limited exceptions apply. Players may hold more than one non-FIFA nationality.

No.	Pos.	Nation	Player
44	MF	SRB	Nemanja Vidić (from Rad)
11	MF	BRA	Bruno Matos (on loan from Red Star Belgrade)
6	MF	SRB	Nemanja Ahčin (on loan from Red Star Belgrade)
2	DF	SRB	Jovica Vasilić (from Vojvodina)
88	MF	MKD	Darko Micevski (from (North Macedonia) Teteks)
77	DF	SRB	Nemanja Zlatković (from Voždovac)
8	MF	SRB	Dušan Pantelić (from Bežanija)
20	DF	GHA	Owusu-Ansah Kontor (free, last with Metalac G.M.)
28	DF	SRB	Marko Paunović (free, last with Napredak Kruševac)
14	FW	SRB	Vojo Ubiparip (from (Hungary) Vasas)
5	DF	SRB	Milan Savić (from OFK Beograd)

Out: Note: Flags indicate national team as defined under FIFA eligibility rules; some limited exceptions apply. Players may hold more than one non-FIFA nationality.

No.	Pos.	Nation	Player
2	DF	SRB	Siniša Stevanović (to (Bosnia and Herzegovina) Željezničar Sarajevo)
20	MF	MKD	Ivan Nastevski (to (North Macedonia) Euromilk)
3	DF	MKD	Stefan Aškovski (loan return to Partizan)
11	DF	SRB	Radoš Protić (loan return to (Bosnia and Herzegovina) Sarajevo)
77	MF	SRB	Predrag Pavlović (to (Lithuania) Sūduva)
5	MF	SRB	Miroljub Kostić (loan return to (Bosnia and Herzegovina) Sarajevo)
—	MF	AUT	Armin Mašović (to (Austria) Kindberg)
8	MF	SRB	Ivan Obrovac (to Mačva Šabac)
26	DF	SRB	Slobodan Vuković (to Radnik Surdulica)
6	MF	SRB	Ivan Todorović (to Borac Čačak)
82	FW	SRB	Jovan Damjanović (to Voždovac)
86	DF	SRB	Marko Đalović (to (Kazakhstan) Zhetysu)
—	FW	SRB	Anes Hot (was on loan, now signed with Tutin)
—	MF	SRB	Amel Lakota (was on loan, now signed with Jošanica)
44	DF	SRB	Demir Kadrić (to Grafičar Beograd)
14	MF	SRB	Faruk Bihorac (to Železničar Lajkovac)

=== OFK Beograd ===
In: Note: Flags indicate national team as defined under FIFA eligibility rules; some limited exceptions apply. Players may hold more than one non-FIFA nationality.

No.	Pos.	Nation	Player
8	MF	MNE	Vladimir Jovović (on loan from Red Star Belgrade)
34	MF	MNE	Nemanja Vlahović (from (Montenegro) Mladost Podgorica)
10	MF	SRB	Marko Pavlovski (on loan from (Portugal) Porto)
15	DF	ARG	Tomás Villoldo (from (Argentina) River Plate)
5	DF	SRB	Danijel Stojković (from Voždovac)
55	DF	SRB	Aranđel Stojković (from BSK Borča)
12	GK	SRB	Đorđe Lazović (from Proleter Novi Sad)
29	GK	AUS	Tomislav Arčaba (from (Australia) Rockdale City Suns)
11	FW	SRB	Nemanja Vidaković (from (Malaysia) Sime Darby)
22	MF	SRB	Pavle Šljivančanin (from Cement Beočin)
19	DF	MNE	Vuk Martinović (from (Bosnia and Herzegovina) Mladost Velika Obarska)
4	MF	SRB	Dragomir Vukobratović (from (Croatia) Osijek)
66	DF	SLO	Emir Dautović (from (Belgium) Mouscron)
23	DF	SRB	Andrija Mijailović (from Teleoptik)
24	MF	SRB	Ivan Tapušković (from Voždovac)
—	FW	SRB	Željko Goljović (from Radnički 1923)
—	MF	SRB	Miloš Podunavac (from Čukarički)

Out: Note: Flags indicate national team as defined under FIFA eligibility rules; some limited exceptions apply. Players may hold more than one non-FIFA nationality.

No.	Pos.	Nation	Player
22	FW	SRB	Ivica Jovanović (to Rad)
15	FW	AZE	Branimir Subašić (released)
24	MF	MKD	Ostoja Stjepanović (to (Cyprus) AEL Limassol)
66	DF	SRB	Nikola Mikić (to (Greece) Kalloni)
4	MF	SRB	Ivan Rogač (to Bačka BP)
55	DF	SRB	Srđa Knežević (to (Greece) Agrotikos Asteras)
12	GK	SRB	Ognjen Čančarević (to Mladost Lučani)
8	FW	SRB	Mladen Sarajlin (to Napredak Kruševac, was on loan at Kolubara)
—	DF	SUI	Stefan Čolović (released)
5	DF	SRB	Milan Savić (to Novi Pazar)
99	FW	SRB	Miljan Škrbić (released)
19	FW	SRB	Željko Dimitrov (on loan to Kolubara)
—	MF	SRB	Stefan Kovačević (on loan to Bačka BP)
26	MF	SRB	Uroš Račić (to Red Star Belgrade)
3	DF	SRB	Nikola Ignjatijević (to (Belarus) Shakhtyor Soligorsk)
—	FW	SRB	Luka Terzić (was on loan, now signed with Sloga Požega)

=== Jagodina ===
In: Note: Flags indicate national team as defined under FIFA eligibility rules; some limited exceptions apply. Players may hold more than one non-FIFA nationality.

No.	Pos.	Nation	Player
2	DF	SRB	Predrag Đorđević (from Radnik Surdulica)
29	MF	SRB	Vuk Mitošević (loan return from (Kazakhstan) Kaisar)
8	MF	SRB	Ivan Cvetković (from (Kazakhstan) Okzhetpes)
35	FW	SRB	Aleksandar Jevtić (from (Belarus) BATE Borisov)
17	FW	SRB	Miroslav Lečić (from Donji Srem)
4	DF	KGZ	Tamirlan Kozubaev (from (Lithuania) Granitas)
33	FW	SRB	Lazar Sajčić (from Partizan)
23	MF	SRB	Stefan Čolović (from (Bosnia and Herzegovina) Drina Zvornik)

Out: Note: Flags indicate national team as defined under FIFA eligibility rules; some limited exceptions apply. Players may hold more than one non-FIFA nationality.

No.	Pos.	Nation	Player
33	DF	SRB	Milan Milinković (to Vojvodina)
8	MF	SRB	Miloš Ožegović (to Sinđelić Beograd)
17	MF	SRB	Miloš Deletić (to Radnik Surdulica)
23	MF	SRB	Veljko Antonijević (to BSK Borča)
91	DF	SRB	Danijel Mihajlović (to Temnić)
35	FW	SRB	Mladen Stoicev (on loan to Tabane Trgovački)
4	DF	SRB	Aleksandar Cvetković (on loan to BSK Borča)
32	FW	SRB	Zoran Mihailović (on loan to Sloga Petrovac na Mlavi)
50	FW	FRA	Goran Jerković (to (Montenegro) Iskra Danilovgrad)
31	MF	SRB	Nemanja Đekić (on loan to Tabane Trgovački)
99	MF	SRB	Nemanja Ivanović (to Sinđelić Beograd)
—	DF	SRB	Nikola Vučetić (on loan to Tabane Trgovački, previously brought from Čukarički)

=== Rad ===
In: Note: Flags indicate national team as defined under FIFA eligibility rules; some limited exceptions apply. Players may hold more than one non-FIFA nationality.

No.	Pos.	Nation	Player
20	MF	SRB	Dejan Rusmir (from Zemun)
8	MF	SRB	Milan Ćulum (from Radnik Surdulica)
26	GK	SRB	Nenad Filipović (free, last with Radnički Niš)
55	DF	SRB	Stevan Bates (free, last with (China) Hunan Billows)
44	DF	BIH	Petar Jovanović (from Voždovac)
12	FW	SRB	Ivica Jovanović (from OFK Beograd)
3	DF	SRB	Radoš Protić (from (Bosnia and Herzegovina) Sarajevo)
88	MF	SRB	Marko Stanojević (free, last with (Saudi Arabia) Al-Fateh)
9	FW	SRB	Andrija Kaluđerović (from (Qatar) Al-Shahania)
7	MF	SRB	Miloš Krstić (from Radnički Niš)

Out: Note: Flags indicate national team as defined under FIFA eligibility rules; some limited exceptions apply. Players may hold more than one non-FIFA nationality.

No.	Pos.	Nation	Player
30	MF	SRB	Branislav Stanić (to Kolubara)
8	MF	SRB	Miloš Milisavljević (to (Bosnia and Herzegovina) Mladost Doboj Kakanj)
26	GK	SRB	Uroš Matić (to Kolubara)
44	MF	SRB	Nemanja Vidić (to Novi Pazar)
—	FW	SRB	Nemanja Gavrilović (on loan to Žarkovo, previously brought from Dorćol)
34	MF	SRB	Filip Bainović (loan extension to Žarkovo)
39	DF	SRB	Aleksandar Milanović (to Žarkovo)
31	DF	SRB	Ivan Kričak (to Žarkovo)
53	GK	SRB	Dušan Marković (on loan to Žarkovo)
20	DF	SRB	Marko Prljević (to (Bosnia and Herzegovina) Borac Banja Luka)
24	DF	MNE	Stefan Vico (on loan to Inđija)
55	DF	SRB	Aleksandar Trninić (to (Iceland) KA)
10	MF	SRB	Đorđe Denić (loan extension to Žarkovo)
9	MF	SRB	Aleksandar Busnić (to Žarkovo)
7	MF	SRB	Dimitrije Pavić (to Žarkovo)
21	DF	SRB	Luka Petrović (on loan to Žarkovo)

=== Spartak Subotica ===
In: Note: Flags indicate national team as defined under FIFA eligibility rules; some limited exceptions apply. Players may hold more than one non-FIFA nationality.

No.	Pos.	Nation	Player
18	MF	SRB	Nenad Šljivić (from (Kazakhstan) Tobol)
28	FW	SRB	Ognjen Mudrinski (from (Switzerland) Aarau)
15	MF	SRB	Slobodan Novaković (from Proleter Novi Sad)
40	DF	SRB	Vukašin Tomić (from Radnik Surdulica)
30	DF	SRB	Vladimir Branković (from (Bosnia and Herzegovina) Vitez)

Out: Note: Flags indicate national team as defined under FIFA eligibility rules; some limited exceptions apply. Players may hold more than one non-FIFA nationality.

No.	Pos.	Nation	Player
3	DF	SRB	Marko Marinković (loan return to Red Star Belgrade)
18	MF	SRB	Dušan Živković (loan return to Red Star Belgrade)
40	FW	MNE	Bojan Božović (to (Bahrain) Manama Club)
23	FW	SRB	Miloš Bogunović (released)
30	DF	MNE	Ermin Alić (to (Montenegro) Rudar Pljevlja)
66	DF	SRB	Marko Klisura (to Bačka BP)
28	FW	SRB	Dušan Tešić (to Sopot)
2	MF	NGR	Eke Uzoma (to (Germany) Chemnitzer FC)
25	GK	SRB	Darko Gabrić (to Bačka Pačir)
15	MF	SRB	Stefan Spremo (on loan to Bačka 1901)

== See also ==
- Serbian SuperLiga
- 2015–16 Serbian SuperLiga
