= 2015–16 FK Partizan season =

Partizan Belgrade
2015–16 season
- President: Zoran Popović; Ivan Ćurković
- Head coach: Zoran Milinković(until 15 October 2015); Ljubinko Drulović(until 21 December 2015); Ivan Tomić
- Stadium: Partizan Stadium (32,710)
- Serbian SuperLiga: Runners-up
- Serbian Cup: Winners
- Champions League: Play-off round
- Europa League: Group stage (3rd)
- Top goalscorer: League: Valeri Bojinov (18 goals); All: Valeri Bojinov (18)
- Highest home attendance: vs BATE Borisov (27,234) (26.8.2015)
- Lowest home attendance: vs Novi Pazar (1,000) (21.11.2015)
Home colours	Away colours	Third colours

The 2015–16 season is FK Partizan's 10th season in Serbian SuperLiga. This article shows player statistics and all matches (official and friendly) that the club have and will play during the 2015–16 season.

== Transfers ==
=== In ===
Date	Position	Name	From	Type	Ref.
3 June 2015	MF	(Serbia) Marko Jevtović	(Serbia) Novi Pazar	Transfer	
5 June 2015	WG	(Serbia) Nikola Trujić	(Serbia) Napredak Kruševac	Transfer	
14 June 2015	FW	(Bulgaria) Valeri Bojinov	(Italy) Ternana	Free transfer	
18 June 2015	DF	(Brazil) Fabrício Dornellas	(Brazil) Bragantino	Loan	
30 June 2015	FW	(Cameroon) Aboubakar Oumarou	(Belgium) Waasland-Beveren	Free transfer	
10 July 2015	MF	(Serbia) Marko Golubović	(Serbia) Teleoptik	Sign	
7 August 2015	MF	(Montenegro) Nebojša Kosović	(Belgium) Standard Liège	Free transfer	
31 August 2015	LB	(Serbia) Nikola Leković	(Poland) Lechia Gdańsk	Loan	
31 August 2015	LB	(Bosnia and Herzegovina) Aleksandar Subić	(Bosnia and Herzegovina) Borac Banja Luka	Transfer	
31 August 2015	WG	(Serbia) Alen Stevanović	(Italy) Torino	Free transfer	
3 November 2015	FW	(Ivory Coast) Ismaël Béko Fofana	(China) Qingdao Jonoon	Loan Recall	
23 December 2015	CB	(Serbia) Marko Jovanović	(Serbia) Voždovac	Free transfer	
23 December 2015	GK	(Serbia) Bojan Šaranov	(Greece) Ergotelis	Free transfer	
28 December 2015	FW	(Serbia) Nemanja Mihajlović	(Serbia) Rad	Transfer	
29 December 2015	MF	(Serbia) Filip Knežević	(Serbia) Borac Čačak	Loan Recall	
6 January 2016	MF	(Brazil) Everton Luiz	(Switzerland) St. Gallen	Transfer	
14 January 2016	LB	(North Macedonia) Stefan Aškovski	(Serbia) Novi Pazar	Loan Recall	
17 January 2016	CB	(Ivory Coast) Cèdric Gogoua	(Finland) SJK	Transfer	

=== Out ===
Date	Position	Name	To	Type	Ref.
1 June 2015	LB	(Montenegro) Vladimir Volkov	(Belgium) KV Mechelen	Released	
9 June 2015	MF	(Montenegro) Nikola Drinčić	(Israel) Maccabi Haifa	Transfer	
15 June 2015	MF	(Serbia) Saša Marković	(Spain) Córdoba	Released	
23 June 2015	MF	(Brazil) Eliomar Silva	(Serbia) Javor	Loan	
6 July 2015	DF	(Slovenia) Branko Ilić	(Kazakhstan) Astana	Transfer	
11 July 2015	LB	(North Macedonia) Stefan Aškovski	(Serbia) Novi Pazar	Loan	
12 July 2015	MF	(Serbia) Danilo Pantić	(England) Chelsea	Released	
12 July 2015	GK	(Serbia) Milan Lukač	(Turkey) Akhisar	Transfer	
30 July 2015	MF	(Serbia) Filip Knežević	(Serbia) Borac Čačak	Loan	
10 August 2015	FW	(Serbia) Nemanja Kojić	(Turkey) Gaziantep B.B.	Transfer	
31 August 2015	FW	(Serbia) Nenad Marinković	(Serbia) Voždovac	Loan	
6 January 2016	MF	(Montenegro) Petar Grbić	(Turkey) Akhisar	Transfer	
12 January 2016	FW	(Serbia) Ivan Šaponjić	(Portugal) Benfica	Transfer	
14 January 2016	MF	(Serbia) Stefan Babović	Unattached	Released	
16 January 2016	LB	(Serbia) Nikola Leković	(Poland) Lechia Gdańsk	Loan return	
21 January 2016	FW	(Serbia) Nenad Marinković	(Serbia) Voždovac	Transfer	

For recent transfers, see List of Serbian football transfers winter 2015-16. For summer transfers, see List of Serbian football transfers summer 2015.

== Players ==
Note: Flags indicate national team as defined under FIFA eligibility rules; some limited exceptions apply. Players may hold more than one non-FIFA nationality.

No.	Pos.	Nation	Player
1	GK	SRB	Živko Živković
2	DF	BUL	Ivan Bandalovski
4	DF	SRB	Miroslav Vulićević
5	DF	SRB	Nemanja Petrović
6	DF	SVN	Gregor Balažic
7	MF	SRB	Predrag Luka
8	MF	SRB	Darko Brašanac
10	FW	CIV	Ismaël Béko Fofana
11	MF	SRB	Nikola Ninković
12	GK	SRB	Filip Kljajić
13	DF	SRB	Lazar Ćirković
15	FW	CMR	Aboubakar Oumarou
17	MF	SRB	Andrija Živković
19	DF	BIH	Aleksandar Subić
20	MF	SRB	Saša Lukić

No.	Pos.	Nation	Player
21	MF	SRB	Marko Jevtović
22	MF	SRB	Saša Ilić (captain)
23	DF	SRB	Marko Jovanović
25	MF	BRA	Everton Luiz
27	MF	MNE	Nebojša Kosović
28	MF	SRB	Ivan Petrović
50	GK	SRB	Bojan Šaranov
51	DF	CIV	Cèdric Gogoua
77	MF	SRB	Nemanja Mihajlović
80	MF	SRB	Marko Golubović
86	FW	BUL	Valeri Bojinov
91	MF	SRB	Alen Stevanović
92	MF	SRB	Nikola Trujić
—	DF	SRB	Miroslav Bogosavac
—	DF	SRB	Miladin Stevanović

=== Top scorers ===
Rank	No.	Pos	Nat	Name	SuperLiga	Cup	Europe	Total
1	86	FW	(Bulgaria)	Valeri Bojinov	18	0	0	18
2	17	MF	(Serbia)	Andrija Živković	7	0	5	12
3	15	FW	(Cameroon)	Aboubakar Oumarou	3	1	6	10
4	7	MF	(Serbia)	Nemanja Mihajlović	5	2	0	7
5	33	FW	(Serbia)	Ivan Šaponjić	3	2	1	6

== Competitions ==
=== Overview ===
Competition	Record							
Competition	P	W	D	L	GF	GA	GD	Win %
Superliga	37	20	7	10	72	44	+28	54.05
Serbian Cup	6	5	1	0	10	0	+10	83.33
UEFA Europa League	12	7	1	4	20	19	+1	58.33
Total	55	32	9	14	102	63	+39	58.18

	Competition	Position
(Serbia)	Serbian SuperLiga	Runner-up
(Serbia)	Serbian Cup	Winners
(European Union)	UEFA Champions League	Play-off round
(European Union)	UEFA Europa League	Group stage

=== Serbian SuperLiga ===
==== League table ====
Pos	Team	Pld	W	D	L	GF	GA	GD	Pts	Qualification
1	Red Star Belgrade (C)	37	30	5	2	97	27	+70	54	Qualification for the Champions League second qualifying round
2	Partizan	37	20	7	10	72	44	+28	40	Qualification for the Europa League second qualifying round (Note: Since the winners of the 2015–16 Serbian Cup, Partizan, qualified for European competition based on league position, the spot awarded to the second-placed team (Europa League first qualifying round) was passed to the fourth-placed team.)
3	Čukarički	37	19	8	10	48	35	+13	39	Qualification for the Europa League first qualifying round
4	Vojvodina	37	16	11	10	57	44	+13	36	Qualification for the Europa League first qualifying round
5	Radnički Niš	37	16	9	12	40	35	+5	35	
6	Borac Čačak	37	14	11	12	46	43	+3	30	
7	Voždovac	37	11	12	14	34	36	−2	25	
8	Radnik Surdulica	37	11	11	15	41	65	−24	25	

Source: UEFA, Soccerway
Rules for classification: 1) Points; 2) Points in regular season; 3) Head-to-head points in regular season; 4) Head-to-head goal difference in regular season; 5) Head-to-head away goals scored in regular season (if two teams tied); 6) Goal difference; 7) Goals scored; 8) Fair-play ranking; 9) Play-off (if two teams tied); 10) Draw (if three or more teams tied).
(Note: Criterion 9 is only used if deciding Champion and places for European competitions.)
(C) Champions

==== Matches ====
17 July 2015 1	Partizan	4–0	Metalac G.M.	Belgrade
20:00 CET	A. Živković 16'; Oumarou 21'; Bojinov 31' 90+2'; Jevtović (yellow card) 51'; Balažic (yellow card) 79'; Ilić 90+2'	Report (in Serbian)	Rnić (yellow card) 42'; Panić (yellow card) 61'	Stadium: Stadion Partizana; Attendance: 3,000; Referee: Milan Ilić

25 July 2015 2	Partizan	6–0	Jagodina	Belgrade
19:00 CET	Bojinov 12' (pen.) 13'; A. Živković 15'; Ninković 50'; Šaponjić 71' 80'	Report (in Serbian)	Ivanović (yellow card) 11'	Stadium: Stadion Partizana; Attendance: 3,000; Referee: Robert Kiš Čepegi

1 August 2015 3	Novi Pazar	3–2	Partizan	Novi Pazar
19:00 CET	Tintor (yellow card) 6'; Pavlović 22' (pen.); Aškovski 27' 72'; Obrovac (yellow card) 89'	Report (in Serbian)	Trujić 13'; Kojić 45+1'; Glavčić (yellow card) 59'; Ninković (yellow card) 90'	Stadium: Gradski Stadion; Attendance: 5,000; Referee: Vlado Glođović

8 August 2015 4	Partizan	2–1	Spartak Subotica	Belgrade
19:00 CET	Bojinov 60'; Lukić (yellow card) 25' (goal) 90+5'; Fabrício (yellow card) 57'; Brašanac (yellow card) 80'; Balažic (yellow card) 88'	Report (in Serbian)	Torbica 59' (pen.); Janošević (yellow card) 67'; Plavšić (yellow card) 78'; Mezei (yellow card) 79'	Stadium: Stadion Partizana; Attendance: 10,000; Referee: Petar Piper

13 August 2015 5	Vojvodina	3–2	Partizan	Novi Sad
20:00 CET	Ivanić 7'; Stanisavljević 14'; Puškarić (yellow card) 41'; Brašanac (yellow card) 51'; Ožegović (yellow card) 74'; Žakula (yellow card) 80'; Đurić (red card) 90+4'	Report (in Serbian)	Fabrício (yellow card) 34'; Bojinov (yellow card) 36'; Oumarou 39' 68'; Brašanac (yellow card) 43' (yellow-red card) 72'; Jevtović (yellow card) 43'	Stadium: Stadion Karađorđe; Attendance: 9,000; Referee: Bojan Nikolić

22 August 2015 6	Borac Čačak	1–3	Partizan	Čačak
19:00 CET	Knežević 71'	Report (in Serbian)	Trujić 38'; Balažic 50'; Lukić 71'	Stadium: Čačak Stadium; Attendance: 5,000; Referee: Danilo Grujić

29 August 2015 7	Partizan	2–1	OFK Beograd	Belgrade
19:00 CET	Živković 6'; Šaponjić 36'; Bandalovski (yellow card) 56'	Report (in Serbian)	Planić (yellow card) 44'; Ignjatijević 52'; Lišćević (yellow card) 76'; Savić (yellow card) 82'	Stadium: Stadion Partizana; Attendance: 4,000; Referee: Ilija Brdar

12 September 2015 8	Red Star	3–1	Partizan	Belgrade
18:00 CET	Vieira 44' 49'; Katai 55'	Report (in Serbian)	Stevanović 45'	Stadium: Stadion Rajko Mitić; Attendance: 35,000; Referee: Milorad Mažić

20 September 2015 9	Partizan	0–0	Radnički Niš	Belgrade
20:00 CET		Report (in Serbian)		Stadium: Stadion Partizana; Attendance: 3,000; Referee: Dejan Dimitrijević

23 September 2015 10	Partizan	1–1	Rad	Belgrade
18:30 CET	Bojinov 22'	Report (in Serbian)	Vidić 20'	Stadium: Stadion Partizana; Attendance: 3,000; Referee: Srđan Jovanović

27 September 2015 11	Voždovac	1–2	Partizan	Belgrade
16:00 CET	Ćirković 4'	Report (in Serbian)	Živković 46'; Babović 73' (pen.)	Stadium: Obilića na Vračaru; Attendance: 1,000; Referee: Milorad Mažić

5 October 2015 12	Partizan	0–1	Čukarički	Belgrade
19:00 CET		Report (in Serbian)	Piasentin 35'	Stadium: Stadion Partizana; Attendance: 6,000; Referee: Milorad Mažić

14 October 2015 13	Radnik Surdulica	2–2	Partizan	Surdulica
17:00 CET	Stanković 57' 71'	Report (in Serbian)	Stevanović 8'; Bojinov 33'	Stadium: Gradski Stadion Surdulica; Attendance: 4,000; Referee: Vlado Glođović

18 October 2015 14	Partizan	3–2	Javor Matis	Belgrade
19:00 CET	Ostojić 29'; Živković 36'; Bojinov 67'	Report (in Serbian)	Dražić 10'; Kolaković 90+2'	Stadium: Stadion Partizana; Attendance: 5,000; Referee: Srđan Obradović

25 October 2015 15	Mladost Lučani	2–2	Partizan	Lučani
17:00 CET	Lepović 10'; Gavrić 89'	Report (in Serbian)	Babović 57'; Grbić 80'	Stadium: Stadion FK Mladost; Attendance: 2,000; Referee: Milija Ilić

1 November 2015 16	Metalac G.M.	1–0	Partizan	Gornji Milanovac
16:00 CET	Mladenović 16' (pen.)	Report (in Serbian)		Stadium: Stadion FK Metalac; Attendance: 3,000; Referee: Dejan Dimitrijević

8 November 2015 17	Jagodina	2–2	Partizan	Jagodina
17:00 CET	Nikolić 11'; Popović 44'	Report (in Serbian)	Bojinov 74'; Babović 84'	Stadium: Stadion pod Đurđevim brdom Attendance: 2,000; Referee: Nenad Đokić

21 November 2015 18	Partizan	3–0	Novi Pazar	Belgrade
15:00 CET	Bojinov 34'; Ninković 49' 90'	Report (in Serbian)		Stadium: Stadion Partizana; Attendance: 1,000; Referee: Milorad Mažić

29 November 2015 19	Spartak Subotica	0–1	Partizan	Subotica
13:00 CET		Report (in Serbian)	Živković 51'	Stadium: Gradski Stadion Subotica; Attendance: 3,000; Referee: Danilo Grujić

5 December 2015 20	Partizan	0–2	Vojvodina	Belgrade
14:00 CET		Report (in Serbian)	Rosić 80'; Stanisavljević 89'	Stadium: Stadion Partizana; Attendance: 10,000; Referee: Bojan Nikolić

13 December 2015 21	Rad	2–2	Partizan	Belgrade
13:00 CET	Trninić 38'; Denić 60'	Report (in Serbian)	Bojinov 73' 84'	Stadium: Kralj Petar I Attendance: 1,000; Referee: Srđan Jovanović

16 December 2015 22	Partizan	2–1	Borac Čačak	Belgrade
17:00 CET	Živković 38'; Bojinov 85'	Report (in Serbian)	Jevtović 17'	Stadium: Stadion Partizana; Attendance: 0 (Stadium Suspension); Referee: Vlado Glođović

21 February 2016 23	OFK Beograd	2–1	Partizan	Belgrade
14:00 CET				Stadium: Obilić Stadium; Attendance: 2,000; Referee: Dejan Filipović

27 February 2016 24	Partizan	1–2	Red Star	Belgrade
17:00 CET				Stadium: Stadion Partizana; Attendance: 25,000; Referee: Vlado Glođović

6 March 2016 25	Radnički Niš	0–1	Partizan	Niš
17:00 CET				Stadium: Stadion Partizana; Attendance: 6,000; Referee: Aleksandar Vasić

12 March 2016 26	Partizan	3–0	Voždovac	Belgrade
15:00 CET				Stadium: Stadion Partizana; Attendance: 0 (Stadium Suspension); Referee: Nenad Đokić

20 March 2016 27	Čukarički	1–2	Partizan	Belgrade
19:00 CET	Bandalovski 1' (o.g.)	Report (in Serbian)	Stevanović 49'; Bojinov 65'	Stadium: Stadion Čukarički; Attendance: 1,500; Referee: Aleksandar Vasić

2 April 2016 28	Partizan	3–2	Radnik Surdulica	Belgrade
16:00 CET	Vlahović 54'; Ilić 66' 70'	Report (in Serbian)	Owusu 20'; Deletić 34'	Stadium: Stadion Partizana; Attendance: 3,000; Referee: Robert Kiš Čepegi

6 April 2016 29	Javor Matis	1–2	Partizan	Ivanjica
16:00 CET	Dražić 73'	Report (in Serbian)	Mihajlović 4'; Crnomarković 29' (o.g.)	Stadium: Stadion Ivanjica; Attendance: 2,000; Referee: Dejan Santrač

10 April 2016 30	Partizan	4–0	Mladost Lučani	Belgrade
16:00 CET	Bojinov 6' (pen.) 45'; Ilić 58' 74'	Report (in Serbian)		Stadium: Stadion Partizana; Attendance: 3,000; Referee: Dejan Santrač

16 April 2016 31	Red Star	1–1	Partizan	Belgrade
18:00 CET	Sikimić 85'	Report (in Serbian)	Everton Luiz 90+4'	Stadium: Stadion Rajko Mitić; Attendance: 37,523; Referee: Aleksandar Vasić

23 April 2016 32	Partizan	1–2	Čukarički	Belgrade
19:00 CET	Bojinov 20'	Report (in Serbian)	Janković 11'; Pavlović 90'	Stadium: Stadion Partizana; Attendance: 3,000; Referee: Nenad Đokić

28 April 2016 33	Partizan	2–0	Borac Čačak	Belgrade
17:00 CET	Golubović 45+1'; Brašanac 73' (pen.)	Report (in Serbian)		Stadium: Stadion Partizana; Attendance: 1,500; Referee: Dejan Anđelković

3 May 2016 34	Radnik Surdulica	0–4	Partizan	Surdulica
18:00 CET		Report (in Serbian)	Bojinov 41' 45'; Mihajlović 59' 90+2'	Stadium: Stadion Radnika; Attendance: 2,500; Referee: Petar Piper

7 May 2016 35	Partizan	2–1	Voždovac	Belgrade
19:00 CET	Golubović 47'; Mihajlović 80'	Report (in Serbian)	Mihajlov 83'	Stadium: Stadion Partizana; Attendance: 1,500; Referee: Nemanja Petković

15 May 2016 36	Radnički Niš	1–0	Partizan	Niš
19:00 CET	Marjanović 40'	Report (in Serbian)		Stadium: Stadion Partizana; Attendance: 4,000; Referee: Milorad Mažić

21 May 2016 37	Partizan	3–2	Vojvodina	Belgrade
19:00 CET	Milenković 7'; Mihajlović 26'; Rosić 62' (o.g.)	Report (in Serbian)	Meleg 32' 73'	Stadium: Stadion Partizana; Attendance: 4,000; Referee: Bojan Nikolić

=== Serbian Cup ===
==== Serbian Cup ====
28 October 2015 R1	Sinđelić	0–2	Partizan	Belgrade
13:00			Šaponjić 48', 69' (pen.)	Stadium: Stadion FK Sinđelić; Attendance: 1,500; Referee: Lazar Lukić

2 December 2015 R2	Voždovac	0–1	Partizan	Belgrade
13:00			Oumarou 29'	Stadium: Stadion FK Obilić; Attendance: 2,000; Referee: Igor Stojilković

2 March 2016 QF	Partizan	2–0	Radnički Niš	Belgrade
13:00	Mihajlović 18'; Mihajlović (penalty missed) 50'; A. Stevanović 79'			Stadium: Stadion Partizana; Attendance: 0 Referee: Milorad Mažić

16 March 2016 Semi-finals 1st leg	Partizan	0–0	Spartak Subotica	Belgrade
18:00				Stadium: Stadion Partizana; Attendance: 3,000; Referee: Milan Ilić

20 April 2016 Semi-finals 2nd leg	Spartak Subotica	0–3 (0–3 agg.)	Partizan	Subotica
16:30			2' Mihajlović; 84' Vlahović; 90' Bandalovski	Stadium: Gradski stadion Attendance: 3,500; Referee: Bojan Nikolić

11 May 2016 Final	Javor	0–2	Partizan	Gornji Milanovac
19:00			35' Jovanović; 90+7' Vlahović	Stadium: Stadion FK Metalac; Attendance: 4,500; Referee: Milorad Mažić

=== UEFA Champions League ===
==== Second qualifying round ====
14 July 2015 QR2	Partizan (Serbia)	1–0	(Georgia (country)) Dila Gori	Belgrade, Serbia
20:45 CET	Babović 83'	Report; Report (in Serbian)	Papava (yellow card) 7'; Martsvaladze (yellow card) 58'; Palavandishvili (yellow card) 65' (yellow-red card) 82'; Kvakhadze (yellow card) 90+3'	Stadium: Stadion Partizana; Attendance: 11,746; Referee: Bastian Dankert (Germany)

21 July 2015 QR2	Dila Gori (Georgia (country))	0–2 (0–3 agg.)	(Serbia) Partizan	Gori, Georgia
14:30 CET	Modebadze (yellow card) 18'; Navalovski (yellow card) 68'; Martsvaladze (yellow card) 68'	Report; Report (in Serbian)	Brašanac 37' (yellow card) 48'; Balažic (yellow card) 60'; Oumarou 64'	Stadium: Tengiz Burjanadze Stadium; Attendance: 3,842; Referee: Daniel Stefanski (Poland)

==== Third qualifying round ====
29 July 2015 QR3	Steaua București (Romania)	1–1	(Serbia) Partizan	Bucharest, Romania
20:30 CET	Popa (yellow card) 40'; Varela (yellow card) 64' (goal) 81'; Breeveld (yellow card) 73'	Report; Report (in Serbian)	Fabrício (yellow card) 58'; Vulićević 62'; Petrović (yellow card) 76'	Stadium: Arena Națională; Attendance: 0* Referee: Kevin Blom (Netherlands)

5 August 2015 QR3	Partizan (Serbia)	4–2 (5–3 agg.)	(Romania) Steaua București	Belgrade, Serbia
20:30 CET	Babović 8' (yellow card) 90+2'; Bojinov (penalty missed) 50'; Jevtović 60'; A. Živković 69'; Trujić 90+1' (yellow card) 90+2'	Report; Report (in Serbian)	Muniru 11'; Hamroun 33' (yellow card) 56'; Varela (red card) 47'; Alcénat (yellow card) 54'; Guilherme (yellow card) 57'; Breeveld (yellow card) 61'	Stadium: Stadion Partizana; Attendance: 26,775; Referee: Istvan Vad (Hungary)

==== Play-off round ====
18 August 2015 Play-off round	BATE Borisov (Belarus)	1–0	(Serbia) Partizan	Barysaw, Belarus
20:45 CET	Gordeichuk (yellow card) 44' (goal) 75'; Zhavnerchik (yellow card) 90+1'	Report; Report (in Serbian)	Jevtović (yellow card) 21' (red card) 45+1'	Stadium: Borisov Arena; Attendance: 11,628; Referee: Craig Thomson (Scotland)

26 August 2015 Play-off round	Partizan (Serbia)	2–1 (2–2 a agg.)	(Belarus) BATE Borisov	Belgrade, Serbia
20:45 CET	Balažic (yellow card) 9'; Zhavnerchik 74' (o.g.); Šaponjić 90+3'	Report; Report (in Serbian)	Zhavnerchik (yellow card) 3'; Mladenović (yellow card) 20'; Stasevich 25' (yellow card) 65'	Stadium: Stadion Partizana; Attendance: 27,234; Referee: Svein Oddvar Moen (Norway)

=== UEFA Europa League ===
==== Group stage ====
Pos	Team	Pld	W	D	L	GF	GA	GD	Pts	Qualification
1	(Spain) Athletic Bilbao	6	4	1	1	16	8	+8	13	Advance to knockout phase
2	(Germany) FC Augsburg	6	3	0	3	12	11	+1	9	Advance to knockout phase
3	(Serbia) Partizan	6	3	0	3	10	14	−4	9	
4	(Netherlands) AZ	6	1	1	4	8	13	−5	4	

Source: Soccerway
Rules for classification: Group stage tiebreakers

17 September 2015 1	Partizan (Serbia)	3–2	(Netherlands) AZ	Belgrade, Serbia
21:05 CET	Oumarou 11', 40'; Balažic (yellow card) 33'; Šaponjić (yellow card) 66'; Leković (yellow card) 87'; A. Živković 89'	Report	Brežančić (yellow card) 23'; Van der Linden 34'; Hupperts (yellow card) (yellow-red card) 77'; Henriksen 90+3'	Stadium: Stadion Partizana; Attendance: 7,949; Referee: Daniele Orsato (Italy)

1 October 2015 2	Augsburg (Germany)	1–3	(Serbia) Partizan	Augsburg, Germany
19:00 CET	Callsen-Bracker (yellow card) 16'; Esswein (yellow card) 59'; Hong Jeong-ho (yellow card) 71'; Bobadilla 57' (yellow card) 90'	Summary	Jevtović (yellow card) 5'; Živković 31' 62'; Vulićević (yellow card) 43'; Fabrício 54'; Subić (yellow card) 64' (yellow-red card); Petrović (yellow card) 84'; Ostojić (yellow card) 86'	Stadium: WWK ARENA; Attendance: 22,948; Referee: (Romania) Alexandru Tudor

22 October 2015 3	Partizan (Serbia)	0–2	(Spain) Athletic Bilbao	Belgrade, Serbia
19:00 CET	Lukić (yellow card) 62'; Ostojić (yellow card) 84'	Summary	Raúl García 32'; Beñat (yellow card) 42' (goal) 85'; Óscar de Marcos (yellow card) 52'; Laporte (yellow card) 54'	Stadium: Stadion Partizana; Attendance: 11,128; Referee: (Poland) Paweł Raczkowski

5 November 2015 4	Athletic Bilbao (Spain)	5–1	(Serbia) Partizan	Bilbao, Spain
21:05 CET	Williams 15' 19'; Beñat 40'; Aduriz 71'; Elustondo 81'	Summary	Oumarou 17'; Ćirković (yellow card) 39'; Jevtović (yellow card) 49'; Fabrício (yellow card) 53'; Vulićević (yellow card) 55'; Šaponjić (yellow card) 61'	Stadium: San Mamés; Attendance: 39,849; Referee: (Greece) Michael Koukoulakis

26 November 2015 5	AZ (Netherlands)	1–2	(Serbia) Partizan	Alkmaar, Netherlands
19:00 CET	Luckassen (yellow card) 45' dos Santos 48'	Summary	Bandalovski (yellow card) 26'; Oumarou 65'; Živković 89' (yellow card) 90'	Stadium: AFAS Stadion; Attendance: 12,784; Referee: (Austria) Harald Lechner

10 December 2015 6	Partizan (Serbia)	1–3	(Germany) Augsburg	Belgrade, Serbia
21:05 CET	Oumarou 11'; Ninković (yellow card) 36'; Živković (yellow card) 60' (yellow-red card)	Summary	Hong Jeong-ho 45'; Verhaegh 51'; Bobadilla 89' (yellow card) 90'	Stadium: Stadion Partizana; Attendance: 14,132; Referee: (Italy) Paolo Tagliavento

== Friendlies ==
24 June 2015 Friendly	FK Zlatibor (Serbia)	0–4	(Serbia) Partizan	Zlatibor, Serbia
18:00		Report (in Serbian)	Kojić 21'; Ninković 36'; Golubović 50'; Marinković 58'	Stadium: Stadion Švajcarija; Attendance: 2,000; Referee: Nenad Đokić

28 June 2015 Friendly	Partizan (Serbia)	0–1	(Russia) Mordovia Saransk	Stara Pazova, Serbia
11:00		Report (in Serbian)	Bobyor 90+2'	Stadium: Stadion SC FSS; Referee: Nenad Santrač

1 July 2015 Friendly	Rudar Velenje (Slovenia)	0–1	(Serbia) Partizan	Pohorje, Slovenia
18:00		Report (in Serbian)	Bojinov 27' (pen.)	Stadium: NK Brunšvik; Attendance: 100; Referee: Bojan Tkalčić

4 July 2015 Friendly	Aluminij (Slovenia)	0–4	(Serbia) Partizan	Pohorje, Slovenia
10:30		Report (in Serbian)	Grbić 37' (pen.); Kojić 66'; Marinković 80'; Luka 82'	Stadium: Teren hotela Arena; Attendance: 100; Referee: Alen Borovšak

4 July 2015 Friendly	Partizan (Serbia)	1–0	(Russia) Terek Grozny	Wildon, Austria
18:00	Bojinov 56' (pen.)	Report (in Serbian)		Stadium: FC Wildon; Attendance: 300; Referee: Stockreither Christin

8 July 2015 Friendly	Partizan (Serbia)	4–1	(Hungary) Vasas	Pohorje, Slovenia
17:00	Ostojić 20'; Oumarou 58'; Trujić 83'; Kojić 86'	Report (in Serbian)	Sanad 65'	Stadium: NK Bakovci; Attendance: 200; Referee: Andrej Tratnek

29 January 2016 Friendly	Partizan (Serbia)	3–1	(Romania) CFR Cluj	Nicosia, Cyprus
14:00	Brašanac 3'; Bojinov 15'; Fofana 76'	Report (in Serbian)	Dani 41'	Stadium: Makario Stadium; Referee: Hristovi

30 January 2016 Friendly	Partizan (Serbia)	1–0	(Russia) Arsenal Tula	Nicosia, Cyprus
17:30	Brašanac 15'	Report (in Serbian)		Stadium: Makario Stadium; Referee: Hristovi

3 February 2016 Friendly	Shijiazhuang Yongchang (China)	0–2	(Serbia) Partizan	Larnaca, Cyprus
10:00		Report (in Serbian)	Mihajlović 38'; Lukić 78'	Stadium: Alfa centar Referee: Kepjeros Peretis

3 February 2016 Friendly	Ufa (Russia)	0–0	(Serbia) Partizan	Nicosia, Cyprus
17:30		Report (in Serbian)		Stadium: Makario Stadium; Referee: Hristovi

6 February 2016 Friendly	Volgar Astrakhan (Russia)	2–2	(Serbia) Partizan	Nicosia, Cyprus
10:00	Kolomiychenko 12'; Pliev 35'	Report (in Serbian)	Golubović 16'; Birmančević 23'	Stadium: assistant field of GSP Stadium; Referee: Aleks Stojanov

6 February 2016 Friendly	Partizan (Serbia)	2–1	(Belarus) Shakhtyor Soligorsk	Nicosia, Cyprus
17:30	Bojinov 21'; Mihajlović 47'	Report (in Serbian)	Burko 86'	Stadium: Makario Stadium; Referee: Hristovi

9 February 2016 Friendly	Tosno (Russia)	0–1	(Serbia) Partizan	Nicosia, Cyprus
14:00		Report (in Serbian)	Bojinov 67' (pen.)	Stadium: Makario Stadium; Referee: Hristovi

== Sponsors ==
Kit sponsors
- Kit manufacturer: (Germany) Adidas
- General sponsor: (Serbia) mt:s
- Other sponsor: (Germany) Audi AG
