= Đekić =

Đekić (Serbian Cyrillic: Ђекић; also transliterated Djekić) is a Serbian surname. It may refer to:

- Nemanja Đekić (born 1997), Serbian football player
- Branislav Đekić (born 1991), Serbian basketball player

== See also ==
- Đeković
