= Miroslav Vulićević =

Serbian footballer

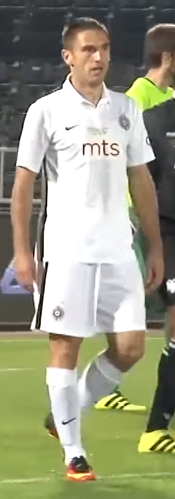
- Vulićević with Partizan in 2016

Personal information
- Full name: Miroslav Vulićević
- Date of birth: 29 May 1985 (age 41)
- Place of birth: Leposavić, SFR Yugoslavia
- Height: 1.76 m (5 ft 9 in)
- Position: Right-back

Youth career
- 2000–2002: Kosmet Leposavić

Senior career*
Years	Team	Apps	(Gls)
2002–2003	Bane	25	(0)
2004–2009	Javor Ivanjica	122	(4)
2006	→ Borac Čačak (loan)	1	(0)
2009–2013	Vojvodina	122	(3)
2014–2019	Partizan	107	(0)
Total		377	(7)

International career
2008–2014	Serbia	3	(0)
- * Club domestic league appearances and goals as of 26 June 2019

Miroslav Vulićević (Serbian Cyrillic: Мирослав Вулићевић; born 29 May 1985) is a Serbian retired footballer who played as a defender.

== Club career ==
=== Early years ===
Vulićević began playing football at Kosmet Leposavić, before moving to Bane. He made his debut for their first team in the Second League of FR Yugoslavia at the age of 17. During the 2004 winter transfer window, Vulićević switched to Javor Ivanjica, staying there until the summer of 2009. He was a member of the team that won the 2007–08 Serbian First League with an unbeaten record. In the meantime, Vulićević spent six months on loan at Borac Čačak in the first half of the 2006–07 season.

=== Vojvodina ===
On 17 June 2009, Vulićević was transferred to Vojvodina, together with his teammate Nnaemeka Ajuru. Both players signed three-year contracts with the Novi Sad-based club. On 30 July 2009, Vulićević made his official debut for Vojvodina, playing the full 90 minutes in a 1–1 draw with Austria Wien. He immediately established himself as the team's first-choice right-back, missing only one out of 30 league matches in the 2009–10 season.

In the winter of 2012, following the departure of Slobodan Medojević to Wolfsburg, Vulićević was named the team's captain by manager Dejan Vukićević. He made his 100th competitive appearance for the club in a 2–0 away league victory over his former club Borac Čačak on 12 May 2012.

In early 2013, Vulićević signed a new one-year contract with Vojvodina. He scored his first official goal for the club in a 2–1 league win over Smederevo on 27 February 2013. Vulićević made a total of 26 league appearances and scored three goals in the 2012–13 campaign, being named in the competition's team of the season.

=== Partizan ===
In the winter of 2014, Vulićević moved to Partizan on a free transfer, penning a three-and-a-half-year deal. He joined newly appointed manager Marko Nikolić; the duo had previously worked together at Vojvodina. Likewise, Vulićević was one of three players, alongside Petar Škuletić and Branislav Trajković, to make moves from Vojvodina to Partizan during the transfer window. He was given the number 4 shirt, last worn by Medo Kamara. After missing the league's first spring fixture due to a yellow-card suspension, Vulićević made his official debut for Partizan on 1 March 2014, playing the full 90 minutes in a 2–1 win over Radnički Niš. He appeared in 11 more league games until the end of the 2013–14 season, as the club failed to win its seventh consecutive title.

On 18 October 2014, Vulićević suffered a cruciate ligament injury during the Belgrade derby, causing him to miss the majority of the 2014–15 season. He returned to the pitch in May 2015, after 200 days of absence, providing two assists in a 6–1 friendly win over Srem Jakovo. Fully recovered, Vulićević managed to make two league appearances, celebrating his first championship title.

On 29 July 2015, Vulićević scored his first competitive goal for Partizan in the first leg of the UEFA Champions League third qualifying round against Steaua București; the game ended in a 1–1 draw. He played the vast majority of his team's games in the first half of the 2015–16 season, but served mainly as a backup right-back to Ivan Bandalovski in the second under newly appointed manager Ivan Tomić.

In the 2016–17 season, Vulićević made a career-high 43 appearances in all competitions, helping Partizan win the double. He was named in the league's best eleven for the third time in his career.

In June 2017, Vulićević signed a two-year extension to his contract with Partizan.

== International career ==
On 14 December 2008, Vulićević made his international debut for Serbia in a friendly match against Poland in Antalya. His second appearance for the national team came in another friendly match, on 7 April 2010, against Japan in Osaka. On both occasions, the team was composed mainly of players from Serbia's top domestic league.

On 6 June 2014, after a four-year absence from the national team, Vulićević made his third and final cap for Serbia in a 0–1 friendly loss to Brazil in São Paulo, coming on as a substitute for Dušan Basta in the 87th minute.

== Statistics ==
=== Club ===
As of 26 June 2019

Club	Season	League		Cup		Continental		Total	
Club	Season	Apps	Goals	Apps	Goals	Apps	Goals	Apps	Goals
Bane	2001–02	2	0	—		—		2	0
Bane	2002–03	7	0	—		—		7	0
Bane	2003–04	16	0	—		—		16	0
Bane	Total	25	0	—		—		25	0
Javor Ivanjica	2003–04	10	2	0	0	—		10	2
Javor Ivanjica	2004–05	25	0	1	0	—		26	0
Javor Ivanjica	2005–06	13	0	1	0	—		14	0
Javor Ivanjica	2006–07	11	0	0	0	—		11	0
Javor Ivanjica	2007–08	30	1	2	0	—		32	1
Javor Ivanjica	2008–09	33	1			—		33	1
Javor Ivanjica	Total	122	4	4	0	—		126	4
Borac Čačak (loan)	2006–07	1	0			—		1	0
Vojvodina	2009–10	29	0	5	0	2	0	36	0
Vojvodina	2010–11	27	0	6	0	—		33	0
Vojvodina	2011–12	25	0	5	0	2	0	32	0
Vojvodina	2012–13	26	3	6	0	4	0	36	3
Vojvodina	2013–14	15	0	3	0	8	1	26	1
Vojvodina	Total	122	3	25	0	16	1	163	4
Partizan	2013–14	12	0	0	0	0	0	12	0
Partizan	2014–15	10	0	2	0	7	0	19	0
Partizan	2015–16	19	0	2	0	11	1	32	1
Partizan	2016–17	35	0	6	0	2	0	43	0
Partizan	2017–18	22	0	4	0	14	0	40	0
Partizan	2018–19	9	0	1	0	0	0	10	0
Partizan	Total	107	0	15	0	34	1	156	1
Career total		377	7	44	0	50	2	471	9

=== International ===
National team	Year	Apps	Goals
Serbia	2008	1	0
Serbia	2009	0	0
Serbia	2010	1	0
Serbia	2011	0	0
Serbia	2012	0	0
Serbia	2013	0	0
Serbia	2014	1	0
Total		3	0

== Honours ==
=== Club ===
Javor Ivanjica

- Serbian First League: 2007–08

Vojvodina

- Serbian Cup: Runner-up 2009–10, 2010–11, 2012–13

Partizan

- Serbian SuperLiga: 2014–15, 2016–17
- Serbian Cup: 2015–16, 2016–17, 2017–18, 2018–19; Runner-up 2014–15

=== Individual ===
- Serbian SuperLiga Team of the Season: 2012–13, 2013–14, 2016–17
