= Mladen Mićanović =

Serbian footballer

Personal information
- Date of birth: 2 December 1996 (age 29)
- Place of birth: Šabac, FR Yugoslavia
- Height: 1.84 m (6 ft 0 in)
- Position: Central midfielder

Youth career
- Mačva Šabac

Senior career*
Years	Team	Apps	(Gls)
2012–2013	Mačva Šabac	7	(0)
2013–2017	Javor Ivanjica	7	(1)
2013–2014	→ Lokomotiva Beograd (loan)	19	(1)
2015	→ IMT (loan)	15	(0)
2017–2018	Bežanija	0	(0)
2018–2019	Jedinstvo Surčin		
2019	Provo		
2019–2020	Budućnost Krušik 2014		
2020–2021	Radnički Sremska Mitrovica	12	(0)
2021–2024	Mačva Šabac	38	(4)
- * Club domestic league appearances and goals as of 26 December 2023

Mladen Mićanović (Serbian Cyrillic: Младен Мићановић; born 2 December 1996) is a Serbian footballer who most recently played as a midfielder for Mačva Šabac.

== Career ==
=== Javor Ivanjica ===
Born in Šabac, Mićanović firstly played football as a youth for local club Mačva. In the summer of 2013, he joined Javor Ivanjica, and was immediately loaned to Serbian League side Lokomotiva Beograd for the 2013–14 season. In July 2014, he had a trial with English club Arsenal that came to nothing. Mićanović made his first-team debut for Javor Ivanjica in March 2015, and finished the 2014–15 season with 1 goal from 6 appearances. For the first half of the 2015–16 season, Mićanović was loaned to another Serbian League team, IMT. He made his Serbian SuperLiga debut for Javor Ivanjica in the season's first spring fixture, against Radnički Niš on 21 February 2016.

== Career statistics ==
As of 26 October 2016

Club	Season	League			Cup		Continental		Other		Total	
Club	Season	Division	Apps	Goals	Apps	Goals	Apps	Goals	Apps	Goals	Apps	Goals
Mačva Šabac	2012–13	Serbian League West	7	0	–	–	–	–	–	–	4	0
Javor Ivanjica	2013–14	Serbian SuperLiga	0	0	0	0	–	–	–	–	0	0
Javor Ivanjica	2014–15	Serbian First League	6	1	0	0	–	–	–	–	6	1
Javor Ivanjica	2015–16	Serbian SuperLiga	1	0	0	0	–	–	–	–	1	0
Javor Ivanjica	2016–17	Serbian SuperLiga	0	0	2	0	–	–	–	–	2	0
Javor Ivanjica	Total		7	1	2	0	–	–	–	–	9	1
Lokomotiva Beograd (loan)	2013–14	Serbian League Belgrade	19	1	–	–	–	–	–	–	19	1
IMT (loan)	2015–16	Serbian League Belgrade	15	0	–	–	–	–	–	–	15	0
Career total			41	2	2	0	–	–	–	–	43	2

== Honours ==
Javor Ivanjica

- Serbian First League: Runners Up 2014-15
