= Vuk Martinović =

Association football player

Personal information
- Full name: Vuk Martinović
- Date of birth: 19 September 1989 (age 37)
- Place of birth: Titograd, SFR Yugoslavia
- Height: 1.80 m (5 ft 11 in)
- Position: Left-back

Team information
- Current team: Charlottetowne Hops FC

Senior career*
Years	Team	Apps	(Gls)
2007–2008	Mladost Podgorica	28	(1)
2008–2011	Grbalj	72	(1)
2011–2015	Lovćen	104	(6)
2011	→ Syrianska (loan)	0	(0)
2015	Mladost Velika Obarska	3	(0)
2016	OFK Beograd	10	(1)
2016–2017	Mladost Podgorica	49	(1)
2018–	Mornar	97	(1)

International career
2009–2010	Montenegro U-21	7	(0)
- * Club domestic league appearances and goals as of 20:28, 27 May 2019 (UTC)

Vuk Martinović (Serbian Cyrillic: Вук Мартиновић; born 19 September 1989) is a Serb-Montenegrin football defender who currently plays for Charlottetowne Hops FC.

== Club career ==
Born in Titograd, Martinović started his career with local club Mladost, but he fully affirmed himself as a captain of OFK Grbalj. Later, he was with Lovćen Cetinje, where he made more than 100 caps. After time he spent with Lovćen, he spent a sport period with Bosnian second tier Mladost Velika Obarska, before he joined OFK Beograd, beginning of 2016.

== Honours ==
Lovćen

- Montenegrin Cup: 2013–14

Montenegro Second League 2020-2021 Winner

== Career statistics ==
As of 22 May 2016

Club	Season	League			Cup		Europe		Other		Total	
Club	Season	Division	Apps	Goals	Apps	Goals	Apps	Goals	Apps	Goals	Apps	Goals
OFK Grbalj	2009–10	Montenegrin First League	22	0	–	–	–	–	–	–	22	0
OFK Grbalj	2010–11	Montenegrin First League	28	1	–	–	–	–	–	–	28	1
OFK Grbalj	Total		50	1	–	–	–	–	–	–	50	1
Lovćen	2011–12	Montenegrin First League	16	0	–	–	–	–	–	–	16	0
Lovćen	2012–13	Montenegrin First League	28	0	1	0	–	–	–	–	29	0
Lovćen	2013–14	Montenegrin First League	31	4	4	0	–	–	–	–	35	0
Lovćen	2014–15	Montenegrin First League	29	2	2	0	2	0	–	–	33	2
Lovćen	Total		104	6	7	0	2	0	–	–	113	6
Mladost Velika Obarska	2015–16	First League of the Republika Srpska	3	0	–	–	–	–	–	–	3	0
Mladost Velika Obarska	Total		3	0	–	–	–	–	–	–	3	0
OFK Beograd	2015–16	Serbian SuperLiga	10	1	1	0	–	–	–	–	11	1
OFK Beograd	Total		10	1	1	0	–	–	–	–	11	1
Career total			167	8	8	0	2	0	0	0	177	8
