= Nikola Bjelanović =

Serbian footballer

Personal information
- Full name: Nikola Bjelanović
- Date of birth: 7 November 1997 (age 29)
- Place of birth: Raška, FR Yugoslavia
- Height: 1.74 m (5 ft 9 in)
- Position: Right-back

Team information
- Current team: OFK Mihajlovac

Youth career
- Bane
- Bežanija
- Lokomotiva Beograd

Senior career*
Years	Team	Apps	(Gls)
2015–2016	Lokomotiva Beograd		
2016–2018	Javor Ivanjica	1	(0)
2016–2017	→ IMT (loan)	22	(1)
2018–2019	Lokomotiva Beograd		
2020	FK Sremčica		
2021	Zvezdara		
2022–2023	BASK		
2023-	OFK Mihajlovac		

International career^{‡}
2015–2016	Serbia U19		
- * Club domestic league appearances and goals as of 14 December 2016 ‡ National team caps and goals as of 14 December 2016

Nikola Bjelanović (Serbian Cyrillic: Никола Бјелановић; born 7 November 1997) is a Serbian professional footballer who plays as a defender for OFK Mihajlovac .

== Club career ==
Born in Raška, Bjelanović played for Bane, Bežanija and Lokomotiva Beograd before he signed a three-year contract with Javor Ivanjica in last days of 2015, as the best right-back of the Serbian youth league and member of Serbia national under-19 football team. He made his Serbian SuperLiga debut for Javor Ivanjica in 35 fixture match of the 2015–16 season, against Metalac Gornji Milanovac, played on 7 May 2016. In summer 2016, Bjelanović moved on loan to FK IMT, where he collected 22 matches with 1 goal for 2016–17 season in the Serbian League Belgrade.

== Career statistics ==
As of 17 June 2017

Club	Season	League			Cup		Continental		Other		Total	
Club	Season	Division	Apps	Goals	Apps	Goals	Apps	Goals	Apps	Goals	Apps	Goals
Javor Ivanjica	2015–16	Serbian SuperLiga	1	0	0	0	—		—		1	0
Javor Ivanjica	2016–17	Serbian SuperLiga	0	0	0	0	—		—		0	0
Javor Ivanjica	Total		1	0	0	0	—		—		1	0
IMT (loan)	2016–17	Serbian League Belgrade	22	1	—		—		—		22	1
Career total			23	1	0	0	—		—		23	1
