= Stefan Spremo =

Serbian footballer

Personal information
- Full name: Stefan Spremo
- Date of birth: 18 May 1997 (age 29)
- Place of birth: Subotica, FR Yugoslavia
- Height: 1.75 m (5 ft 9 in)
- Position: Midfielder

Team information
- Current team: Jadran Feketić

Youth career
- Spartak Subotica

Senior career*
Years	Team	Apps	(Gls)
2015–2016	Spartak Subotica	3	(0)
2016	→ Bačka 1901 (loan)	4	(0)
2016–2019	Bačka 1901		
2019–2022	Tavankut		
2022–2023	Kelebijska Šuma		
2023	Tavankut		
2024–	Jadran Feketić		
- * Club domestic league appearances and goals as of 15 June 2016

Stefan Spremo (Serbian Cyrillic: Стефан Спремо; born 18 May 1997) is a Serbian football midfielder who plays for Jadran Feketić.

== Career ==
=== Spartak Subotica ===
Spremo signed his first professional three-year contract with Spartak Subotica in July 2015. He made his Serbian SuperLiga in 4th fixture of 2015–16 season, against Partizan.

== Career statistics ==
As of 17 October 2015

Club performance			League		Cup		Continental		Total	
Season	Club	League	Apps	Goals	Apps	Goals	Apps	Goals	Apps	Goals
Serbia			League		Serbian Cup		Europe		Total	
2015–16	Spartak	SuperLiga	3	0	0	0	0	0	3	0
Total	Serbia		3	0	0	0	0	0	3	0
Career total			3	0	0	0	0	0	3	0
