= Dušan Živković =

Serbian footballer

Personal information
- Date of birth: 31 July 1996 (age 30)
- Place of birth: Leskovac, FR Yugoslavia
- Height: 1.79 m (5 ft 10 in)
- Position: Left wing

Team information
- Current team: Dubočica
- Number: 11

Youth career
- Red Star Belgrade

Senior career*
Years	Team	Apps	(Gls)
2013–2016	Red Star Belgrade	0	(0)
2015	→ Spartak Subotica (loan)	8	(0)
2016	→ Bežanija (loan)	5	(0)
2016–2017	Radnički Niš	26	(1)
2018–2021	Rad	56	(1)
2021–2023	Rudar Pljevlja	67	(13)
2023	Sutjeska	21	(1)
2024	Rudar Pljevlja	10	(1)
2024–	Dubočica	42	(3)

International career^{‡}
2014	Serbia U19	1	(0)
- * Club domestic league appearances and goals as of 14 May 2026 ‡ National team caps and goals as of 15 November 2014

Dušan Živković (Serbian Cyrillic: Душан Живковић; born 31 July 1996) is a Serbian football player who plays as a midfielder for GFK Dubočica.

== Career ==
=== Red Star Belgrade ===
Dušan was licensed for the first team of Red Star under coach Ricardo Sá Pinto in 2013, before the last fixture of the 2012–13 against Vojvodina, but he was not in protocol. He stayed with youth team until summer 2015, when he impressed coach Božović on the summer preparations, before the 2015–16, who decided to send him on loan to get more experience. In summer 2016, he terminated contract and left the club.

"The Star should take ten million on this guy."

— Nikola Mijailović, 2015

==== Loans ====
Živković and Marinković was loaned to Spartak Subotica at the beginning of season 2015–16. Dušan made his official debut for Spartak Subotica in the 1st fixture of Serbian SuperLiga, against Radnik Surdulica, played on 18 July 2015. After only several matches for Spartak, he returned to Belgrade. Živković spent the rest of 2015–16 on loan at Bežanija.

=== Radnički Niš ===
On 21 July 2016, Živković signed a three-year contract with Radnički Niš.

=== Rudar Pljevlja ===
On 8 February 2021, he signed with Rudar Pljevlja in Montenegro.

== Career statistics ==
As of 4 December 2016

Club	Season	League			Cup		Continental		Other		Total	
Club	Season	Division	Apps	Goals	Apps	Goals	Apps	Goals	Apps	Goals	Apps	Goals
Red Star Belgrade	2012–13	SuperLiga	0	0	–	–	–	–	–	–	0	0
Red Star Belgrade	2013–14	SuperLiga	0	0	0	0	0	0	–	–	0	0
Red Star Belgrade	2014–15	SuperLiga	0	0	0	0	–	–	–	–	0	0
Red Star Belgrade	2015–16	SuperLiga	0	0	0	0	0	0	–	–	0	0
Red Star Belgrade	Total		0	0	0	0	0	0	–	–	0	0
Spartak Subotica (loan)	2015–16	SuperLiga	8	0	0	0	–	–	–	–	8	0
Bežanija (loan)	2015–16	First League	5	0	–	–	–	–	–	–	5	0
Radnički Niš	2016–17	SuperLiga	17	0	1	0	–	–	–	–	18	0
Career total			30	0	1	0	0	0	–	–	31	0
