= Tomás Villoldo =

Argentinean association football player

Tomas Villoldo
Personal information
- Date of birth: 28 February 1995 (age 31)
- Place of birth: Buenos Aires, Argentina
- Height: 1.78 m (5 ft 10 in)
- Position: Defender

Team information
- Current team: Almirante Brown

Youth career
- River Plate

Senior career*
Years	Team	Apps	(Gls)
2015	River Plate	0	(0)
2016	OFK Beograd	1	(0)
2016–2017	Deportivo Riestra	1	(0)
2017–2019	San Miguel	53	(1)
2019–2020	Almirante Brown	7	(0)
2020–2025	Deportivo Riestra	96	(0)
2025–	Almirante Brown	36	(0)
- * Club domestic league appearances and goals as of 17:25, 22 April 2026 (UTC)

Tomas Villoldo (born 28 February 1995) is an Argentine professional footballer who plays as a defender for Almirante Brown.

== Career ==
Villoldo started his senior career with Club Atlético River Plate where he got after escalating through their youth ranks. After playing with River the Weifang Cup, he got an offer, and accepted, to play for Serbian side OFK Beograd, However, due to his young age, he failed to make a debut in the second half of the 2015–16 Serbian SuperLiga, ending up playing only one game in the Serbian Cup during his stay in Europe. In August 2016 he returns to Argentina and joins Deportivo Riestra. After a year, he signs with Club Atlético San Miguel where he spends two highly productive seasons in Primera B Metropolitana. In 2019, he signed for Club Almirante Brown playing in Argentinian same level.

In late November 2020, Villoldo left Almirante Brown, to re-join his former club Deportivo Riestra.
