= Jovan Trnić =

Serbian footballer (born 1996)

Personal information
- Date of birth: 3 December 1996 (age 29)
- Place of birth: Sremska Mitrovica, FR Yugoslavia
- Height: 1.99 m (6 ft 6 in)
- Position: Goalkeeper

Youth career
- Sirmium
- Srem
- Partizan
- Teleoptik

Senior career*
Years	Team	Apps	(Gls)
2014–2015	Teleoptik	1	(0)
2015–2019	Partizan	0	(0)
2015–2019	→ Teleoptik (loan)	88	(0)
2019–2020	Radnički Sremska Mitrovica		
2020	Budućnost Dobanovci	2	(0)
2021	Sloga Požega		
2022	Sloga Erdevik		
2023	Hajduk Divoš		
- * Club domestic league appearances and goals as of 25 October 2023

Jovan Trnić (Serbian Cyrillic: Јован Трнић; born 3 December 1996) is a Serbian footballer who plays as a goalkeeper.

== Career ==
=== Partizan ===
Born in Sremska Mitrovica, Trnić started his football career with youth categories of FK Sirmium. Later he moved to Srem and finally joined Partizan as a cadet. Next, he passed youth categories with the club, he moved to the satellite club Teleoptik, where he also played as a member of the youth team during the 2014–15 campaign, making a single appearance with the first squad in the Serbian League Belgrade. After Milan Lukač left the club in the summer of 2015, Trnić joined the first team of Partizan under coach Zoran Milinković. He was licensed for the Serbian SuperLiga and UEFA Europa League during the 2015–16 campaign with number 26 jersey. While with Partizan as a third goalkeeper behind Živko Živković and Filip Kljajić, Trnić was also loaned back to Teleoptik at dual-registration for the first half-season. Next the club signed Bojan Šaranov and Marko Jovičić in the winter transfer window, and Trnić extended his loan to Teleoptik for the rest of the season. Trnić continued playing in the Serbian League Belgrade in the 2016–17 campaign, helping the team win the competition and promoted to the Serbian First League. On the last day of January 2017, Trnić signed a three-year professional contract with Partizan. Trnić returned to the first team of Partizan under coach Miroslav Đukić, at the beginning of 2018. Passing the winter break with the first team, Trnić also stayed with Teleoptik in the second half of the 2017–18 Serbian First League campaign.

=== Radnički Sremska ===
Ahead of the 2019-20 season, Trnić joined FK Radnički Sremska Mitrovica.

== Career statistics ==
As of 8 June 2018

Appearances and goals by club, season and competition
Club	Season	League			Cup		Continental		Other		Total	
Club	Season	Division	Apps	Goals	Apps	Goals	Apps	Goals	Apps	Goals	Apps	Goals
Teleoptik	2014–15	Serbian League Belgrade	1	0	—		—		—		1	0
Teleoptik (loan)	2015–16	Serbian League Belgrade	25	0	—		—		—		25	0
Teleoptik (loan)	2016–17	Serbian League Belgrade	27	0	—		—		—		27	0
Teleoptik (loan)	2017–18	Serbian First League	24	0	—		—		—		24	0
Teleoptik (loan)	2018–19	Serbian First League	12	0	1	0	—		—		13	0
Teleoptik (loan)	Total		89	0	1	0	—		—		90	0
Partizan	2015–16	Serbian SuperLiga	0	0	0	0	0	0	—		0	0
Partizan	2016–17	Serbian SuperLiga	0	0	0	0	0	0	—		0	0
Partizan	2017–18	Serbian SuperLiga	0	0	0	0	0	0	—		0	0
Partizan	Total		0	0	0	0	0	0	—		0	0
Career total			89	0	1	0	0	0	—		90	0

== Honours ==
Teleoptik

- Serbian League Belgrade: 2016–17
