= Ivan Bandalovski =

Bulgarian footballer

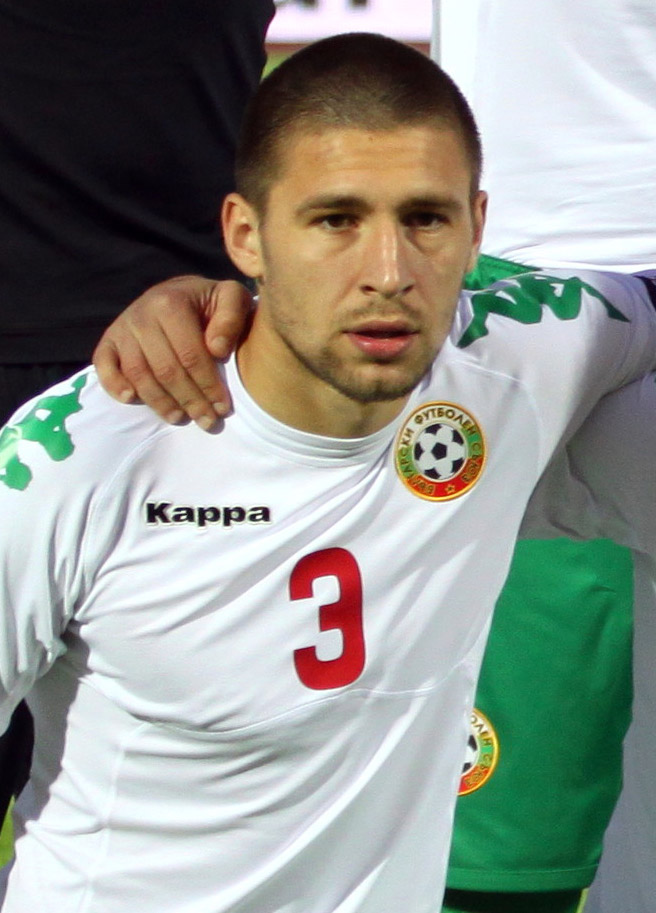
- Bandalovski with Bulgaria in 2011

Personal information
- Full name: Ivan Georgiev Bandalovski
- Date of birth: 23 November 1986 (age 39)
- Place of birth: Sofia, Bulgaria
- Height: 1.84 m (6 ft 0 in)
- Positions: Centre-back; right-back

Youth career
- 1994–2004: Levski Sofia

Senior career*
Years	Team	Apps	(Gls)
2004–2007	Litex Lovech	21	(0)
2005–2006	→ Feyenoord (loan)	0	(0)
2008–2010	Lokomotiv Sofia	40	(3)
2010–2013	CSKA Sofia	64	(3)
2013–2014	OH Leuven	29	(0)
2014–2016	Partizan	37	(0)
2017	Vereya	9	(2)
2017	Anorthosis	9	(0)
2018–2019	Beroe	56	(2)
2020	Botev Plovdiv	21	(0)
2020–2021	Tsarsko Selo	33	(0)
Total		356	(10)

International career
2004–2007	Bulgaria U21	12	(0)
2009–2019	Bulgaria	19	(0)
- * Club domestic league appearances and goals

Ivan Georgiev Bandalovski (Bulgarian: Иван Георгиев Бандаловски; born 23 November 1986) is a Bulgarian former professional footballer who played as a defender.

== Club career ==
=== Early career ===
Bandalovski started playing football in the youth team of Levski Sofia at the age of seven. He was not offered a professional contract with the club and in the summer of 2004, at the age of 17, signed with Litex Lovech. He earned his first professional cap against Lokomotiv Plovdiv for Bulgarian Supercup in Burgas on 31 July 2004 at the age of 17. In Lovech Bandalovski played several championship matches and was noticed by Feyenoord Rotterdam. In January 2005 the player went on loan to the Dutch team for 18 months. In June 2006 he returned to Litex.

=== Lokomotiv Sofia ===
In January 2008 Bandalovski signed for Lokomotiv Sofia. Performing as a solid back, it didn't last long until he gained head coach Dragan Okuka's trust and became a starter. Sometimes credited as having a bad temper, he maintained the status of one of the most trustworthy defenders in the league, and soon was called up to the Bulgaria national football team.

=== CSKA Sofia ===
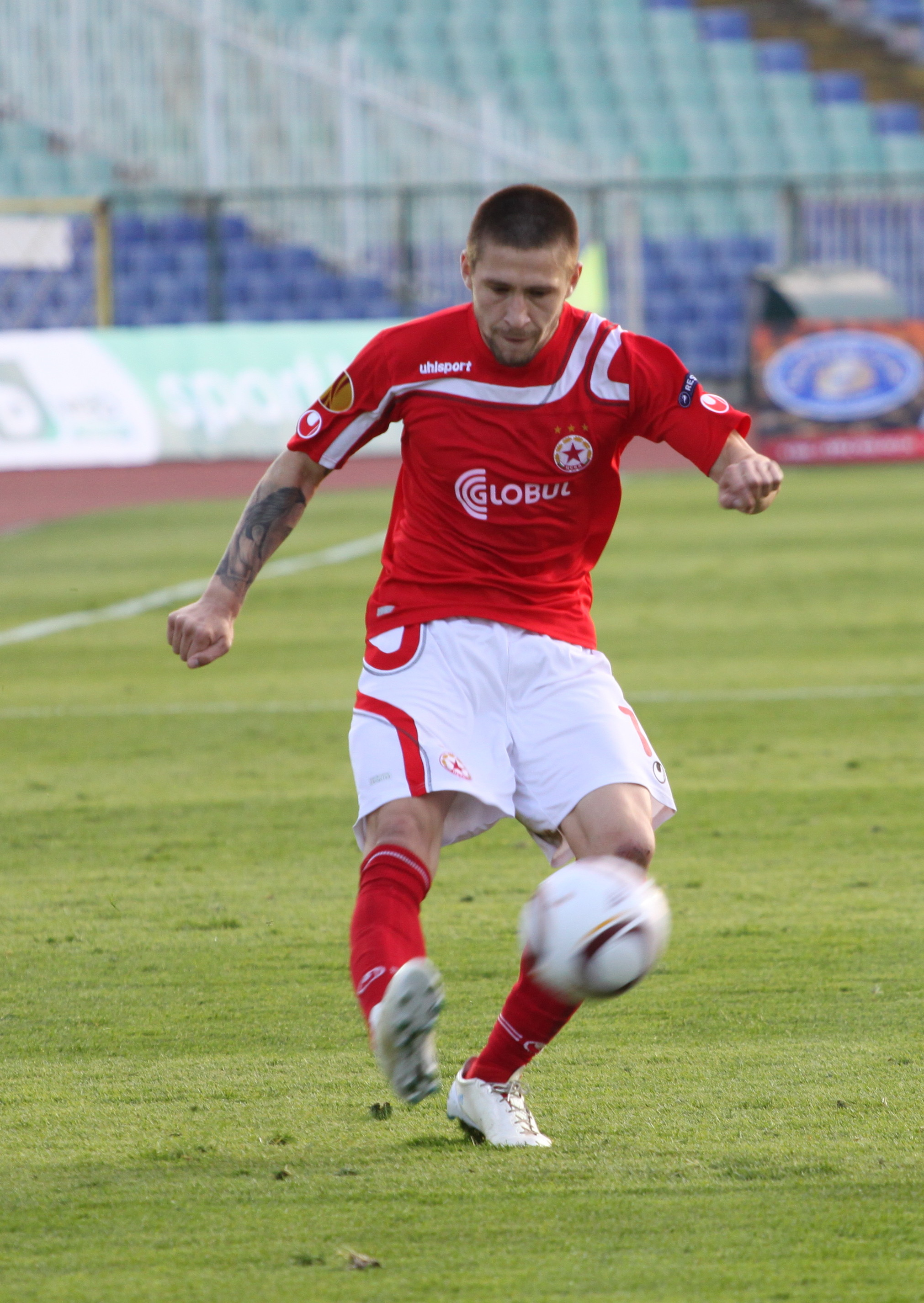
Bandalovski with CSKA Sofia in 2010

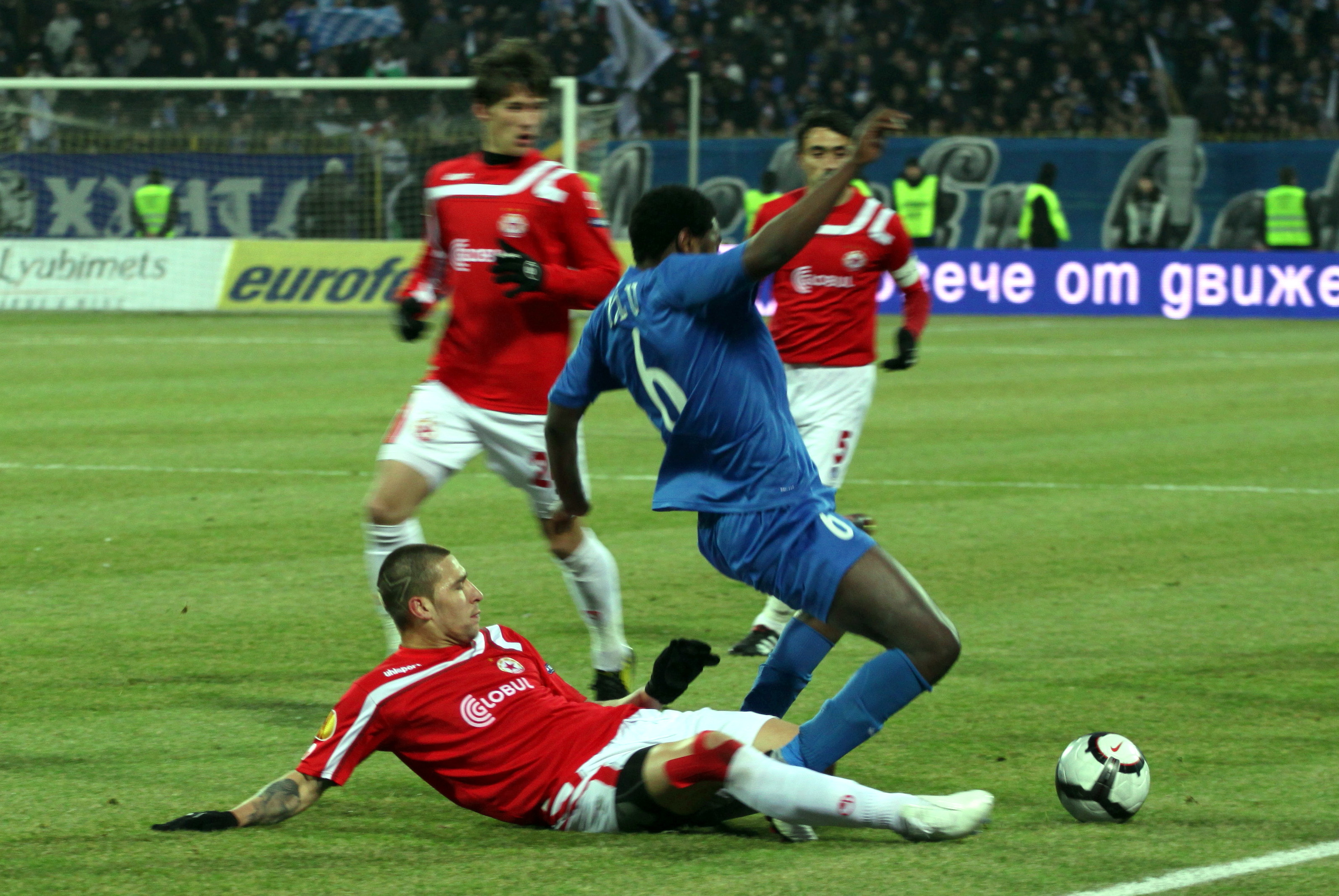
Bandalovski knocks the ball from the feet of Belgian player of Levski Sofia, Jeanvion Yulu-Matondo

In the fall of 2010 he signed with CSKA Sofia. He made his competitive debut for CSKA Sofia on 13 November 2010, in a 1–0 home league win against Lokomotiv Plovdiv. He has won a Bulgarian Cup and Bulgarian Supercup in 2011. In 2012, he won the prize best defender in Bulgarian A Football Group. On 4 March 2012, Bandalovski has first time played for CSKA Sofia as captain in the match against Chernomorets Burgas. He was followed by some clubs in Europe like A.S. Roma, S.S. Lazio, FC Steaua București. On 22 March 2012, Bandalovski has scored his first goal for CSKA, against his former club, Lokomotiv Sofia in 1–0 home win.

In 2012, he became the captain of the team. Due to its financial difficulties the club wasn't able to offer him a new contract, instead it had to release him as a free agent.

=== Oud-Heverlee Leuven ===
On 25 July 2013, Bandalovski signed a three-year contract with Oud-Heverlee Leuven in the Belgian Pro League. Because he was a free agent, the player was brought in without a transfer fee. On 10 August 2013, Bandalovski made his Belgian Pro League debut, playing the full 90 minutes in the 1–1 away draw with KV Oostende. After facing relegation with Oud-Heverlee Leuven, Bandalovski left the team in the summer of 2014.

=== Partizan ===
On 30 January 2015, Bandalovski signed a contract with Serbian team Partizan to replace the injured Miroslav Vulićević. He was given the number 2 jersey upon promotion to the club, and it was revealed that Bandalovski had been recruited by coach Marko Nikolić. For Partizan made his debut on 21 February 2015 against Voždovac. Throughout the spring part of the championship, Bandalovski was played all matches in Serbian Cup and Serbian SuperLiga. During all 18 matches (including the Serbian league and cup of Serbia) he got only one yellow card.

During the first part of the 2015–16 season, after an injury of Gregor Balažic, Bandalovski began to play in the starting lineup as centre defender. On 21 November 2015, he has first time played as centre back against Novi Pazar in 3–0 home league win. Five days later, Bandalovski has played full match against Dutch club AZ Alkmaar at AFAS Stadion in 1–2 away win in 2015–16 UEFA Europa League group stage. On 20 April 2016, Bandalovski scored his first goal for Partizan against Spartak Subotica in the second leg of Semi-finals of Serbian Cup in 3–0 away win.

=== Vereya ===
On 2 March 2017, Bandalovski signed with Vereya until the end of the season. He left the team in June after his contract expired.

=== Anorthosis ===
On 6 June 2017, Bandalovski signed with Cypriot First Division club Anorthosis Famagusta.

=== Beroe ===
On 16 January 2018, Bandalovski signed with First League of Bulgaria club Beroe Stara Zagora.

== International career ==
Since 2004 Bandalovski has been playing for Bulgaria's under-21 team. However, in October 2009, he earned his first call-up to the Bulgaria national football team against Georgia. On 14 October 2009, he made his debut against Georgia in 2010 FIFA World Cup qualifier the 6–2 win. On 12 October 2012, Bandalovski was sent off against Denmark after a foul on Daniel Wass in 2014 FIFA World Cup qualifier.

His solid performances with Partizan earned him a return to the national team in the friendly game against Turkey played on 8 June 2015. He also played the full 90 minutes in the 0:1 loss against Norway in a Euro 2016 qualifier held on 3 September 2015.

== Career statistics ==
=== Club ===
- As of 20 August 2019

Club	Season	League		Cup		Europe		Total	
Club	Season	Apps	Goals	Apps	Goals	Apps	Goals	Apps	Goals
Litex Lovech	2004–05	8	0	1	0	3	0	12	0
Feyenoord	2004–05	0	0	0	0	0	0	0	0
Feyenoord	2005–06	0	0	0	0	0	0	0	0
Litex Lovech	2006–07	11	0	1	0	0	0	12	0
Litex Lovech	2007–08	2	0	0	0	1	0	3	0
Lokomotiv Sofia	2007–08	7	0	0	0	0	0	7	0
Lokomotiv Sofia	2008–09	12	1	1	0	2	0	15	1
Lokomotiv Sofia	2009–10	21	2	2	0	–	–	23	2
CSKA Sofia	2010–11	15	0	4	0	0	0	19	0
CSKA Sofia	2011–12	26	1	2	0	2	0	30	1
CSKA Sofia	2012–13	23	2	2	0	1	0	26	2
Oud-Heverlee Leuven	2013–14	29	0	2	0	–	–	31	0
Partizan	2014–15	15	0	3	0	0	0	18	0
Partizan	2015–16	22	0	5	1	2	0	29	1
Vereya Stara Zagora	2016–17	9	2	3	0	–	–	12	2
Anorthosis Famagusta	2017–18	9	0	0	0	–	–	9	0
Beroe Stara Zagora	2017–18	10	1	0	0	–	–	10	1
Beroe Stara Zagora	2018–19	32	1	1	0	–	–	33	1
Beroe Stara Zagora	2019–20	14	0	0	0	–	–	14	0
Botev Plovdiv	2019–20	12	0	3	0	–	–	15	0
Tsarsko Selo	2020–21	20	0	0	0	–	–	20	0
Tsarsko Selo	2021–22	13	0	1	0	–	–	14	0
Career total		302	10	31	1	11	0	352	11

=== International matches ===
International appearances and goals
#	Date	Venue	Opponent	Result	Goal	Competition
1	14 October 2009	Sofia, Bulgaria	Georgia	6–2	0	2010 FIFA World Cup qualification
2	18 November 2009	Paola, Malta	Malta	1–4	0	Friendly
3	26 March 2011	Sofia, Bulgaria	Switzerland	0–0	0	UEFA Euro 2012 qualification
4	29 March 2011	Larnaca, Cyprus	Cyprus	0–1	0	Friendly
5	4 June 2011	Podgorica, Montenegro	Montenegro	1–1	0	UEFA Euro 2012 qualification
6	10 August 2011	Minsk, Belarus	Belarus	1–0	0	Friendly
7	2 September 2011	Sofia, Bulgaria	England	0–3	0	UEFA Euro 2012 qualification
8	7 October 2011	Kyiv, Ukraine	Ukraine	3–0	0	Friendly
9	29 February 2012	Győr, Hungary	Hungary	1–1	0	Friendly
10	29 May 2012	Salzburg, Austria	Turkey	0–2	0	Friendly
11	15 August 2012	Sofia, Bulgaria	Cyprus	1–0	0	Friendly
12	12 October 2012	Sofia, Bulgaria	Denmark	1–1	0	2014 FIFA World Cup qualification
13	8 June 2015	Istanbul, Turkey	Turkey	0–4	0	Friendly
14	12 June 2015	Valletta, Malta	Malta	0–1	0	UEFA Euro 2016 qualification
15	3 September 2015	Sofia, Bulgaria	Norway	0–1	0	UEFA Euro 2016 qualification
16	6 September 2015	Palermo, Italy	Italy	1–0	0	UEFA Euro 2016 qualification
17	6 September 2018	Stožice Stadium, Ljubljana	Slovenia	2–1	0	2018–19 UEFA Nations League
18	9 September 2018	Sofia, Bulgaria	Norway	1–0	0	2018–19 UEFA Nations League

== Honours ==
Litex

- Bulgarian Cup

- 2007–08
CSKA Sofia

- Bulgarian Cup

- 2010–11
Bulgarian Supercup
- 2011
Partizan

- Serbian SuperLiga

- 2014–15

- Serbian Cup

- 2015–16
