= Lazar Sajčić =

Serbian footballer (born 1996)

Personal information
- Date of birth: 24 September 1996 (age 30)
- Place of birth: Belgrade, FR Yugoslavia
- Height: 1.88 m (6 ft 2 in)
- Position: Winger

Team information
- Current team: Sloga Meridian

Youth career
- Partizan

Senior career*
Years	Team	Apps	(Gls)
2013–2015	Partizan	0	(0)
2013–2015	→ Teleoptik (loan)	43	(17)
2015	→ Sinđelić Beograd (loan)	15	(3)
2016	Jagodina	3	(0)
2016–2017	Borac Čačak	34	(2)
2018	Dynamo České Budějovice	3	(0)
2019–2020	Gorodeya	47	(9)
2021	Gomel	10	(2)
2021	Atyrau	0	(0)
2022–2023	Hegelmann	43	(8)
2024	Gorica	4	(1)
2024	Kuala Lumpur City	0	(0)
2024	Zemun	6	(0)
2025	Riteriai	15	(3)
2025–	Sloga Meridian	0	(0)
- * Club domestic league appearances and goals as of 23 June 2025

Lazar Sajčić (Serbian Cyrillic: Лазар Сајчић; born 24 September 1996) is a Serbian footballer who plays for Bosnian Premier League club Sloga Meridian.

== Career ==
Born in Belgrade, Sajčić passed Partizan youth school, and later spent 2 seasons with Teleoptik. He scored 18 goals for the 2014–15 season including 4 in a match against Hajduk Beograd and was the best scorer of Serbian League Belgrade. After a half-season with Sinđelić Beograd, Sajčić joined Jagodina for the spring half of 2015–16 season. Later, same year, Sajčić moved in Borac Čačak.

In April 2024, he joined Malaysia Super League club Kuala Lumpur City but left in August 2024 without making a single appearance.

On 27 February 2025 announced that Lazar Sajčić signed with lithiaunian Riteriai Club. On 1 March 2025 he played debut match in A Lyga against Sūduva
