= Marko Golubović =

Serbian footballer

Personal information
- Date of birth: 20 September 1995 (age 31)
- Place of birth: Majdanpek, FR Yugoslavia
- Height: 1.73 m (5 ft 8 in)
- Position: Winger

Youth career
- 2004–2013: Partizan

Senior career*
Years	Team	Apps	(Gls)
2013–2015	Teleoptik	43	(10)
2015–2017	Partizan	14	(2)
2016	→ Teleoptik (loan)	1	(0)
2016–2017	→ Sinđelić Beograd (loan)	18	(1)
2017	Radnički Niš	10	(0)
2019–2020	Krupa	23	(3)
2021	Sloga Doboj	13	(1)
2021	Timok	8	(0)

International career
2016	Serbia U21	1	(0)
- * Club domestic league appearances and goals as of 26 September 2022

Marko Golubović (Serbian Cyrillic: Марко Голубовић; born 20 September 1995) is a Serbian professional footballer who plays as a winger.

== Club career ==
=== Partizan ===
Born Majdanpek, Golubović joined Partizan at the age of 9. After the youth categories, he was with Teleoptik for 2 seasons. In his first season with Teleoptik, Golubović made 24 league appearances and also played 1 cup match. After the club got relegated from the Serbian First League, Golubović noted 8 goals on 19 Serbian League Belgrade matches for the 2014–15 season. He also appeared for the club in the spring half of the 2015–16 season, on dual registration.

He signed his first professional contract with Partizan on 10 July 2015, and took the jersey number 80. Golubović made his Serbian SuperLiga debut in the 3rd fixture of the 2015–16 Serbian SuperLiga, against Novi Pazar. In the summer of 2016, Golubović moved to Sinđelić Beograd on a one-year loan. After making 17 appearances and scoring 2 goals in all competitions for the club, Golubović terminated his contract with Partizan and left as a free agent in July 2017.

=== Radnički Niš ===
Several days after he left Partizan, Golubović signed a three-year contract with Radnički Niš. He made his debut for the club in a 3–0 defeat against Red Star Belgrade in the first fixture of the 2017–18 Serbian SuperLiga season, played on 23 July 2017 at the Rajko Mitić Stadium.

=== Krupa ===
On 11 August 2019, Golubović signed a contract with, at the time, First League of RS club Krupa. On 8 May 2020, the 2019–20 First League of RS season ended abruptly due to the COVID-19 pandemic in Bosnia and Herzegovina and by default, Golubović with Krupa, were crowned league champions and got promoted back to the Bosnian Premier League. He terminated his contract with the club on 19 December 2020.

== International career ==
In 2016, Golubović represented the Serbia U21 national team, making one appearance.

== Career statistics ==
As of match played 31 October 2020.

Appearances and goals by club, season and competition
Club	Season	League			Cup		Continental		Other		Total	
Club	Season	Division	Apps	Goals	Apps	Goals	Apps	Goals	Apps	Goals	Apps	Goals
Teleoptik	2013–14	Serbian First League	24	2	1	0	—		—		25	2
Teleoptik	2014–15	Serbian League Belgrade	19	8	—		—		—		19	8
Teleoptik	2015–16 (loan)	Serbian League Belgrade	1	0	—		—		—		1	0
Teleoptik	Total		44	10	1	0	—		—		45	10
Partizan	2015–16	Serbian SuperLiga	14	2	3	0	0	0	—		17	2
Partizan	2016–17	Serbian SuperLiga	0	0	0	0	0	0	—		0	0
Partizan	Total		14	2	3	0	0	0	—		17	2
Sinđelić Beograd (loan)	2016–17	Serbian First League	18	1	1	0	—		—		19	1
Radnički Niš	2017–18	Serbian SuperLiga	10	0	1	0	—		—		11	0
Krupa	2019–20	Republika Srpska First League	12	3	1	0	—		—		13	3
Krupa	2020–21	Bosnian Premier League	10	0	0	0	—		—		10	0
Krupa	Total		22	3	1	0	—		—		23	3
Career total			108	16	7	0	0	0	—		115	16

== Honours ==
Partizan

- Serbian Cup: 2015–16

Krupa

- First League of RS: 2019–20
