= Slobodan Vuković =

Serbian footballer

Personal information
- Date of birth: 23 January 1986 (age 40)
- Place of birth: Titov Vrbas, SFR Yugoslavia
- Height: 1.92 m (6 ft 4 in)
- Position: Centre-back

Youth career
- 2000–2004: Red Star Belgrade

Senior career*
| Years | Team | Apps | (Gls) |
| 2004–2006 | → Sopot (loan) | 64 | (15) |
| 2006 | Rad | 0 | (0) |
| 2007–2008 | → Palić (loan) | 43 | (4) |
| 2008 | → Mladenovac (loan) | 9 | (1) |
| 2009 | → Voždovac (loan) | 14 | (2) |
| 2009–2010 | Voždovac | 27 | (6) |
| 2011 | Partizán Bardejov | | |
| 2011–2012 | Banat Zrenjanin | 34 | (4) |
| 2013 | Hajduk Kula | 11 | (1) |
| 2013–2015 | Novi Pazar | 69 | (0) |
| 2016–2017 | Radnik Surdulica | 38 | (2) |
| 2017–2018 | Zemun | 24 | (0) |
| 2018–2019 | Aittitos Spata | 4 | (0) |
| 2019–2022 | Hajduk Kula | 70 | (8) |
- * Club domestic league appearances and goals as of 28 June 2022

Slobodan Vuković (Serbian Cyrillic: Слободан Вуковић; born 23 January 1986) is a Serbian footballer who played as a centre back. He is an older brother of Jagoš Vuković.

== Career ==
Born in Vrbas, he has started career in his neighbourhood club Sutjeska from Bačko Dobro Polje, there he was spotted by Serbian giants Red Star Belgrade. In year 2000, along with younger brother Jagoš he has moved to Belgrade side youth.

After youth experience in Red Star Belgrade, Slobodan was loaned to 3rd division club Sopot, there he has spent two fruitful years and earned move to Rad. After six months without a cap, he was loaned for a year to Palić, and then to Mladenovac.

After half season, he was added to second league side Voždovac, and soon his performances granted him full-time contract. After two years in Voždovac, Vuković moved abroad, to Slovak Partizán Bardejov. After that, this centre-back went back to Serbia and spent one year in Banat, again in second league.

Having a lot of experience in lower ranks, Vuković had his debut in Serbian top level Serbian SuperLiga at the age of 27 when he became a Hajduk Kula player, six months later due to debt, a club was dissolved, and most players and Vuković among them made move to Novi Pazar.
