= Nemanja Mihajlović =

Serbian footballer

Personal information
- Date of birth: 19 January 1996 (age 30)
- Place of birth: Belgrade, FR Yugoslavia
- Height: 1.73 m (5 ft 8 in)
- Position: Left winger

Team information
- Current team: Žalgiris
- Number: 71

Youth career
- 2003–2015: Rad

Senior career*
Years	Team	Apps	(Gls)
2013–2015	Rad	54	(5)
2015–2017	Partizan	51	(10)
2017–2020	Heerenveen	29	(3)
2020	Arka Gdynia	8	(1)
2020–2021	Boluspor	15	(1)
2021	→ Balıkesirspor (loan)	6	(0)
2021–2022	Spartak Subotica	18	(0)
2022–2023	Sloga Meridian	14	(0)
2023–2024	Borac Banja Luka	7	(0)
2024–	Žalgiris	43	(6)

International career
2012–2013	Serbia U17	6	(1)
2014–2015	Serbia U19	2	(0)
2016–2017	Serbia U21	6	(1)
- * Club domestic league appearances and goals as of 9 March 2026

Nemanja Mihajlović (Serbian Cyrillic: Немања Михајловић, pronounced [němaɲa mixǎːjloʋitɕ]; born 19 January 1996) is a Serbian professional footballer who plays as a winger for A Lyga club Žalgiris.

== Club career ==
=== Rad ===
Mihajlović debuted for Rad's first team on 3 April 2013, in a Serbian SuperLiga match versus Donji Srem Pećinci. On 16 August 2014, he scored the equalizer and first goal for Rad in a 2–1 home win over Borac Čačak. In the winter of 2014, it was revealed Mihajlović was scouted by Saint-Étienne. However, Rad declined the €1.2 million offer. On 28 February 2015, Mihajlović scored a winning goal against Borac Čačak. After the end of the 2014–15 season, Serbian sports portal Mozzart Sport rated Mihajlović among the 25 best players in the SuperLiga that season.

On 1 August 2015, Mihajlović scored from long range in what was his first goal of the 2015–16 season in a 4–1 away victory over Radnik Surdulica. On 12 August 2015, against Mladost Lučani, at the start of the second half, he scored from the penalty-spot. He scored his second goal in 4–2 home victory. Rad were losing at half-time and after the turnaround in the second half, Rad went on to win with Mihajlović scoring two goals and providing one assist. During the 2015–16 season, he played 7 matches in the Serbian SuperLiga, scored three goals and provided two assists.

=== Partizan ===
On 28 December 2015, Mihajlović signed for Partizan on a three-year contract. On 21 February, he made his official debut for the club against OFK Beograd. On 2 March, he scored his first official goal for Partizan in Serbian Cup Quarter final against Radnički Niš in a 2–0 home win. His first goal for Partizan in 2015–16 Serbian SuperLiga came on 6 April against Javor Ivanjica in a 1–2 away win and helped Partizan to achieve five consecutive championship of Serbia wins after a year and a half ago. On 3 May 2016, Mihajlović scored a brace in a 4–0 away league win over Radnik Surdulica.

=== Heerenveen ===
On 28 July 2017, Mihajlović signed a four-year contract with Eredivisie club Heerenveen, choosing to wear jersey number 15. The transfer fee is believed to be around €1.7 million. He scored his first goal for Heerenveen on his debut, in a 1–1 draw with Heracles on 19 August 2017.

=== Arka Gdynia ===
On 17 January 2020, Mihajlović signed a contract for the rest of the season with Polish Ekstraklasa club Arka Gdynia.

=== Spartak Subotica ===
On 2 September 2021, he signed with Spartak Subotica for a term of two-and-a-half years.

== International career ==
Mihajlović has played for the Serbia national under-17 team and Serbia national under-18 team.

Mihajlović received his first call-up for the Serbia national under-21 team by manager Tomislav Sivić in March 2016. On 25 March 2016, he played his first match for Serbia U21s, against Andorra at Estadi Comunal in Andorra la Vella, playing in the starting eleven in a 0–4 away win in a 2017 UEFA European Under-21 Championship qualifier.

After a great 2015–16 season with Partizan in the Serbian SuperLiga, Slavoljub Muslin called him up to the Serbia national team for several friendly matches in 2016.

== Career statistics ==
=== Club ===
As of 9 December 2017

Appearances and goals by club, season and competition
Club	Season	League			National cup (Note: Includes Serbian Cup, KNVB Cup)		Continental		Other		Total	
Club	Season	Division	Apps	Goals	Apps	Goals	Apps	Goals	Apps	Goals	Apps	Goals
Rad	2012–13	Serbian SuperLiga	4	0	0	0	—		—		4	0
Rad	2013–14	Serbian SuperLiga	19	0	1	0	—		1 (Note: Appearance in league play-offs)	0	21	0
Rad	2014–15	Serbian SuperLiga	24	2	2	0	—		—		26	2
Rad	2015–16	Serbian SuperLiga	7	3	0	0	—		—		7	3
Rad	Total		54	5	3	0	—		1	0	58	5
Partizan	2015–16	Serbian SuperLiga	14	5	4	2	—		—		18	7
Partizan	2016–17	Serbian SuperLiga	25	2	3	0	2 (Note: Appearances in UEFA Europa League)	0	—		31	2
Partizan	2017–18	Serbian SuperLiga	1	1	—		2 (Note: Appearances in UEFA Champions League)	0	—		3	1
Partizan	Total		40	8	7	2	4	0	—		52	10
Heerenveen	2017–18	Eredivisie	11	2	1	0	—		—		12	2
Career total			105	15	11	2	4	0	1	0	121	17

== Honours ==
Partizan

- Serbian SuperLiga: 2016–17
- Serbian Cup: 2015–16, 2016–17

Individual

- Serbian SuperLiga Team of the Season: 2015–16
- Serbian SuperLiga top assists: 2015–16
