= Stefan Ashkovski =

Macedonian footballer

Personal information
- Date of birth: 24 February 1992 (age 34)
- Place of birth: Skopje, Macedonia
- Height: 1.79 m (5 ft 10 1/2 in)
- Position: Winger

Team information
- Current team: PSS Sleman
- Number: 15

Youth career
- Metalurg Skopje
- –2010: Vardar

Senior career*
Years	Team	Apps	(Gls)
2010–2012	Teleoptik	57	(5)
2012–2015	Partizan	1	(0)
2013	→ Donji Srem (loan)	14	(2)
2014	→ Napredak (loan)	11	(0)
2014	→ Strømsgodset (loan)	0	(0)
2015	→ Shkëndija (loan)	5	(0)
2015	→ Novi Pazar (loan)	14	(3)
2016	Kayseri Erciyesspor	12	(1)
2016–2018	Fortuna Sittard	49	(12)
2017	→ Górnik Łęczna (loan)	1	(0)
2018–2019	Slavia Sofia	16	(0)
2019–2021	Botoșani	55	(6)
2021–2022	Sepsi OSK	37	(2)
2022–2023	Lamia	16	(0)
2024	Alashkert	7	(0)
2024–2025	Şanlıurfaspor	13	(0)
2025	Ethnikos Achna	4	(0)
2025–2026	Radnički Niš	7	(0)
2026	Mes Rafsanjan	3	(0)
2026–	PSS Sleman	2	(0)

International career^{‡}
2008	Macedonia U17	3	(0)
2009–2011	Macedonia U19	17	(2)
2012–2014	Macedonia U21	13	(0)
2015–2025	North Macedonia	40	(0)
- * Club domestic league appearances and goals as of 20 September 2026 ‡ National team caps and goals as of 11 December 2025

Stefan Ashkovski (Macedonian: Стефан Ашковски, born 24 February 1992) is a Macedonian professional footballer who plays as a winger for Super League club PSS Sleman and the North Macedonia national team.

== Club career ==
Born in Skopje, Macedonia, Ashkovski started his career in Serbia, playing with FK Teleoptik in the Serbian First League. After two solid seasons with Teleoptik, he moved to Partizan in summer 2012. He made his debut for Partizan on November 11, 2012, against FK Radnički 1923. In the summer of 2013, he was loaned to another SuperLiga side, FK Donji Srem. He was loaned to Napredak Kruševac in 2014, but moved to the reigning Tippeliga champions, Strømsgodset, on a half-year loan deal in July the same year. The Norwegian club had an option to buy the player, which was not exercised.

== International career ==
In 2008, Ashkovski started representing Macedonia at U17 level, and he was a regular presence for the U19 and U21 teams.

After a good start of season in the 2015–16 Serbian SuperLiga with FK Novi Pazar where he scored three goals in the first six rounds, on 21 August 2015 Ashkovski received a call from Macedonia national team coach Ljubinko Drulović. He made his senior debut for North Macedonia in a September 2015 European Championship qualification match against Luxembourg and has, as of 24 February 2024, earned a total of 28 caps, scoring no goals.

=== International stats ===
As of match played 18 November 2025

Appearances and goals by national team and year
National team	Year	Apps	Goals
North Macedonia	2015	3	0
North Macedonia	2021	7	0
North Macedonia	2022	8	0
North Macedonia	2023	10	0
North Macedonia	2024	7	0
North Macedonia	2025	5	0
Total		40	0

== Honours ==
Partizan

- Serbian SuperLiga: 2012–13

Sepsi OSK

- Cupa României: 2021–22
