= Ivan Obrovac =

Serbian footballer

Personal information
- Date of birth: 8 December 1986 (age 39)
- Place of birth: Šabac, SFR Yugoslavia
- Height: 1.81 m (5 ft 11 in)
- Position: Midfielder

Senior career*
Years	Team	Apps	(Gls)
2004–2009	Rad	65	(3)
2006	→ Radnički Obrenovac (loan)	17	(3)
2007	→ Palilulac Beograd (loan)	14	(1)
2008–2009	→ BSK Borča (loan)	28	(1)
2009–2011	Mačva Šabac	39	(10)
2010	→ BSK Borča (loan)	13	(2)
2011–2012	Radnički Kragujevac	24	(1)
2012–2013	Hajduk Kula	21	(1)
2013–2015	Novi Pazar	50	(2)
2016–2019	Mačva Šabac	77	(4)
2019–2020	Mladost Lučani	5	(1)
2020–2021	Mačva Šabac	42	(1)
2021–2024	Mačva 1929 Bogatić		

International career
2004–2005	Serbia and Montenegro U19 (Note: Only official UEFA matches included)	5	(0)
- * Club domestic league appearances and goals as of 18 May 2021

Ivan Obrovac (Serbian Cyrillic: Иван Обровац; born 8 December 1986) is a Serbian retired footballer.

== Career ==
Born in Šabac, Obrovac started out at Rad, making his senior debut in the 2003–04 season. He later played for BSK Borča, Radnički Kragujevac, Hajduk Kula, Novi Pazar and Mačva Šabac in the Serbian SuperLiga. In June 2019, Obrovac signed with Mladost Lučani.

== Honours ==
Mačva Šabac

- Serbian League West: 2015–16
