= Nemanja Đekić =

Serbian footballer

Personal information
- Full name: Nemanja Đekić
- Date of birth: 13 May 1997 (age 29)
- Place of birth: Kragujevac, FR Yugoslavia
- Height: 1.76 m (5 ft 9 in)
- Position: Defensive midfielder

Team information
- Current team: FC Tribuswinkel
- Number: 3

Youth career
- Radnički Kragujevac
- Partizan

Senior career*
Years	Team	Apps	(Gls)
2015–2016	Jagodina	16	(0)
2016	→ Tabane Jagodina (loan)		
2016–2017	Karađorđe Topola	11	(0)
2017–2018	Zvijezda Gradačac	18	(0)
2018–2019	Modriča	15	(1)
2019–2021	Zvijezda Gradačac	9	(0)
2023–	FC Tribuswinkel	19	(0)
- * Club domestic league appearances and goals as of 14 June 2024

Nemanja Đekić (Serbian Cyrillic: Немања Ђекић; born 13 May 1997) is a Serbian football midfielder who plays for Austrian lower league side FC Tribuswinkel. He had previously played in Bosnia and Herzegovina with NK Zvijezda Gradačac.

== Career ==
In mid January 2019, Đekić rejoined Zvijezda Gradačac.
