= Milan Savić (footballer, born 1994) =

Serbian footballer

Personal information
- Date of birth: 4 April 1994 (age 32)
- Place of birth: Belgrade, FR Yugoslavia
- Height: 1.84 m (6 ft 0 in)
- Position: Centre-back

Team information
- Current team: Grafičar
- Number: 5

Youth career
- Partizan
- Gent

Senior career*
Years	Team	Apps	(Gls)
2013	Gent	1	(0)
2013	→ Hoogstraten (loan)	11	(1)
2014–2015	OFK Beograd	37	(0)
2016	Novi Pazar	11	(0)
2016	Αnorthosis	0	(0)
2017	Novi Pazar	9	(0)
2017	Balzan	0	(0)
2017–2018	RFS	27	(0)
2019	Zemun	10	(0)
2019–2020	Inter Zaprešić	15	(0)
2020–2021	Ethnikos Achna	19	(0)
2021–2023	Radnički Niš	41	(0)
2024	Brodarac		
2024–	Grafičar	7	(0)

International career
2011	Serbia U17	2	(0)
2013	Serbia U19	0	(0)
2015	Serbia U23	1	(0)
- * Club domestic league appearances and goals as of 1 July 2025

Milan Savić (Serbian Cyrillic: Милан Савић; born 4 April 1994) is a Serbian professional footballer who plays as a defender for Grafičar Belgrade.

== Club career ==
On 24 September 2021, he joined Radnički Niš.
