= 2015–16 Serbian SuperLiga =

10th season of the Serbian SuperLiga

SuperLiga
- Season: 2015–16
- Champions: Red Star; 3rd SuperLiga Title; 28th domestic title
- Champions League: Red Star
- Europa League: Partizan; Čukarički; Vojvodina
- Matches: 272
- Goals: 680 (2.5 per match)
- Top goalscorer: Aleksandar Katai (21)
- Biggest home win: Partizan 6–0 Jagodina
- Biggest away win: Čukarički 2–7 Red Star
- Highest scoring: Čukarički 2–7 Red Star
- Longest winning run: Red Star 24 games
- Longest unbeaten run: Red Star 31 games
- Highest attendance: 40,261 Red Star 3–1 Partizan
- Total attendance: 454,566

The 2015–16 Serbian SuperLiga is the tenth season of the Serbian SuperLiga, the top tier of league football in Serbia. The season started on 17 July 2015 and finished on 21 May 2016. Partizan were the defending champions.

== Changes from 2014–15 ==
=== Structural changes ===
The competition has been split into two stages, regular season and playoffs.

==== Regular season ====
Each of the 16 competitors in the SuperLiga hosts every other team once in the regular season, for a total of 30 matches. A win earns three points and a draw earns one point. Teams are ranked by total points, then by total wins and finally by goal difference, number of scored goals, number of away goals and number of away wins. If teams are still level, a test-match is played in two legs to determine the final order in the standings. A playoff phase is then played from March to May.

==== Championship playoff ====
The point system in the championship playoff is the same as during the regular season, except that each team starts with half of the points they won in the regular season, rounded up to the nearest integer.

The top eight teams from the regular season enter the championship playoff, with the first-placed team winning the championship of Serbia. Each team plays their opponents once. In the case of a tie, the number of points won in the regular season will be used as a primary tie-breaker.

==== Relegation playoff ====
Teams ranked 9 to 16 after the regular season enter the relegation playoffs, with the last two placed teams will be relegated to the Serbian First League. Each team plays their opponents once.

== Teams ==
Location of teams in 2015–16 Serbian SuperLiga

The league contains 16 teams: thirteen teams from the 2014–15 Serbian SuperLiga, two new teams from the 2014–15 Serbian First League and the winner of the play-offs between the 14th placed team from the 2014–15 SuperLiga and the third placed team from the 2014–15 First League. Radnik, the 2014–15 First League champion, joins the top level for the first time in its history. Runners-up Javor are back just one year after their relegation. Metalac won the play-off against Napredak Kruševac and returns to the top level after three years.

=== Stadiums and locations ===
Club	City	Stadium	Capacity
Borac	Čačak	Čačak Stadium	8,000
Čukarički	Belgrade	Čukarički Stadium	4,070
Jagodina	Jagodina	City Stadium	15,000
Javor	Ivanjica	Ivanjica Stadium	4,000
Metalac	Gornji Milanovac	Metalac Stadium	4,400
Mladost	Lučani	Mladost Stadium	8,000
Novi Pazar	Novi Pazar	City Stadium	12,000
OFK Beograd	Belgrade	Omladinski Stadium	19,100
Partizan	Belgrade	Partizan Stadium	32,710
Rad	Belgrade	King Peter I Stadium	6,000
Radnički	Niš	Čair Stadium	18,151
Radnik	Surdulica	City Stadium	3,500
Red Star	Belgrade	Rajko Mitić Stadium	55,538
Spartak	Subotica	City Stadium	13,000
Vojvodina	Novi Sad	Karađorđe Stadium	14,458
Voždovac	Belgrade	Shopping Center Stadium	5,200

=== Personnel and kits ===
Note: Flags indicate national team as has been defined under FIFA eligibility rules. Players and Managers may hold more than one non-FIFA nationality.

Team	Head coach	Captain	Kit manufacturer	Front shirt sponsor
FK Borac Čačak	(Serbia) Ljubiša Stamenković	(Serbia) Mario Maslać	NAAI	Škoda Auto
FK Čukarički	(Serbia) Milan Lešnjak	(Serbia) Igor Matić	adidas	ADOC
FK Jagodina	(Serbia) Aleksandar Janjić	(Serbia) Aleksandar Filipović	Legea	—
FK Javor Ivanjica	(Serbia) Mladen Dodić	(Serbia) Milovan Milović	Erima	Matis doo
FK Metalac Gornji Milanovac	(Serbia) Nenad Vanić	(Serbia) Aleksandar Ivanović	Image Sport	Metalac Group
FK Mladost Lučani	(Serbia) Nenad Milovanović	(Serbia) Nemanja Krznarić	Miteks	Miteks
FK Novi Pazar	(Serbia) Zoran Marić	(Serbia) Jasmin Trtovac	Macron	Dragolovcanin
OFK Beograd	(Montenegro) Dragan Radojičić	(Serbia) Bogdan Planić	Joma	DDOR
FK Partizan	(Serbia) Ivan Tomić	(Serbia) Saša Ilić	adidas	mt:s
FK Rad	(Serbia) Bogdan Korak	(Serbia) Nikola Maraš	NAAI	Rubikon
FK Radnički Niš	(Serbia) Milan Rastavac	(Serbia) Aleksandar Jovanović	NAAI	—
FK Radnik Surdulica	(Serbia) Miloš Veselinović	(Serbia) Miloš Krstić	Legea	—
FK Crvena Zvezda	(Montenegro) Miodrag Božović	(Serbia) Aleksandar Luković	Puma	Gazprom
FK Spartak Subotica	(Russia) Andrey Chernyshov	(Serbia) Vladimir Torbica	Legea	—
FK Vojvodina	(Serbia) Nenad Lalatović	(Serbia) Nino Pekarić	Umbro	—
FK Voždovac	(Serbia) Bratislav Živković	(Serbia) Miloš Pavlović	NAAI	Stadion SC

Select Sport is the official ball supplier for Serbian SuperLiga.

== Transfers ==
For the list of transfers involving SuperLiga clubs during 2014–15 season, please see: List of Serbian football transfers summer 2015 and List of Serbian football transfers winter 2015–16.

== Regular season ==
=== League table ===
Pos	Team	Pld	W	D	L	GF	GA	GD	Pts	Qualification or relegation
1	Red Star Belgrade	30	26	4	0	82	19	+63	82	Qualification for the championship round
2	Partizan	30	16	6	8	59	37	+22	54	Qualification for the championship round
3	Čukarički	30	15	8	7	37	22	+15	53	Qualification for the championship round
4	Borac Čačak	30	12	10	8	37	29	+8	46 (Note: Head-to-head record: Borac Čačak–Vojvodina 4–2, Vojvodina–Borac Čačak 1–1.)	Qualification for the championship round
5	Vojvodina	30	12	10	8	44	38	+6	46	Qualification for the championship round
6	Radnički Niš	30	12	9	9	26	23	+3	45	Qualification for the championship round
7	Voždovac	30	10	10	10	30	29	+1	40	Qualification for the championship round
8	Radnik Surdulica	30	9	11	10	34	46	−12	38	Qualification for the championship round
9	Javor Ivanjica	30	8	11	11	21	24	−3	35 (Note: Head-to-head record: Metalac G.M.–Javor Ivanjica 0–0, Javor Ivanjica–Metalac G.M. 1–0.)	Qualification for the relegation round
10	Metalac Gornji Milanovac	30	8	11	11	29	35	−6	35	Qualification for the relegation round
11	Mladost Lučani	30	7	12	11	25	38	−13	33	Qualification for the relegation round
12	Novi Pazar	30	7	10	13	21	39	−18	31	Qualification for the relegation round
13	OFK Beograd	30	8	4	18	27	44	−17	28	Qualification for the relegation round
14	Spartak Subotica (Note: Spartak Subotica were penalized two points.)	30	6	10	14	20	37	−17	26 (Note: Head-to-head record: Spartak Subotica 8pts, Jagodina 5pts, Rad 2pts.)	Qualification for the relegation round
15	Jagodina	30	5	11	14	22	43	−21	26	Qualification for the relegation round
16	Rad	30	5	11	14	30	41	−11	26	Qualification for the relegation round

Source: UEFA, Soccerway
Rules for classification: 1) Points; 2) Head-to-head points; 3) Head-to-head goal difference; 4) Head-to-head away goals scored (if two teams tied); 5) Goal difference; 6) Goals scored; 7) Fair-play ranking; 8) Draw.

=== Results ===
Each of the 16 competitors in the SuperLiga hosts every other team once in the regular season, for a total of 30 matches.

Home \ Away	BOR	ČUK	JAG	JAV	MET	MLA	NPZ	OFK	PAR	RAD	RNI	RSU	RSB	SPA	VOJ	VŽD
Borac Čačak		1–0	3–0	0–1	2–1	1–2	3–0	1–0	1–3	0–0	2–1	4–2	1–1	0–0	4–2	1–1
Čukarički	1–0		2–0	1–0	1–1	0–1	1–0	1–0	1–2	1–1	0–1	2–0	2–7	3–0	1–1	0–0
Jagodina	0–0	1–3		1–0	0–1	0–3	1–2	3–1	2–2	1–0	1–2	1–1	0–3	1–1	1–1	0–0
Javor Ivanjica	0–1	0–0	1–1		1–0	0–0	1–1	2–1	1–2	3–0	0–0	0–1	0–3	2–0	0–1	0–0
Metalac Gornji Milanovac	2–0	1–2	1–4	0–0		0–0	3–2	3–1	1–0	2–2	0–2	2–2	0–0	1–0	0–0	1–1
Mladost Lučani	1–1	0–2	2–0	1–1	0–0		1–1	0–0	2–2	1–0	0–1	0–0	0–3	0–0	1–2	0–0
Novi Pazar	0–0	0–0	1–0	0–1	2–2	1–3		1–0	3–2	1–0	1–0	2–0	0–4	0–0	1–1	1–1
OFK Beograd	1–1	0–3	0–2	0–1	1–0	0–1	0–0		2–1	2–0	0–2	3–0	2–6	2–0	1–0	2–1
Partizan	2–1	0–1	6–0	3–2	4–0	4–0	3–0	2–1		1–1	0–0	3–2	1–2	2–1	0–2	3–0
Rad	2–3	0–1	0–0	1–1	0–1	4–2	1–0	1–1	2–2		2–0	4–1	0–3	3–3	2–2	0–2
Radnički Niš	0–1	0–0	0–0	2–0	2–1	1–1	0–0	1–0	0–1	1–0		1–1	1–2	1–0	0–3	0–0
Radnik Surdulica	1–0	2–1	0–0	1–1	0–0	3–1	2–0	2–1	2–2	1–1	2–1		0–2	1–0	2–2	1–3
Red Star Belgrade	4–2	3–1	3–1	1–0	2–0	2–1	2–0	4–1	3–1	1–0	1–1	5–0		4–0	3–0	2–0
Spartak Subotica	0–0	0–2	0–0	0–0	0–3	2–0	2–0	2–1	0–1	2–1	1–2	0–0	2–3		2–1	0–2
Vojvodina	1–1	0–4	3–1	2–0	3–2	3–0	4–1	1–0	3–2	1–2	0–2	2–3	0–0	1–1		2–1
Voždovac	0–2	0–0	1–0	0–2	1–0	4–1	1–0	2–3	1–2	1–0	3–1	2–1	2–3	0–1	0–0	

Legend: Blue = home team win; Yellow = draw; Red = away team win.

== Play-offs ==
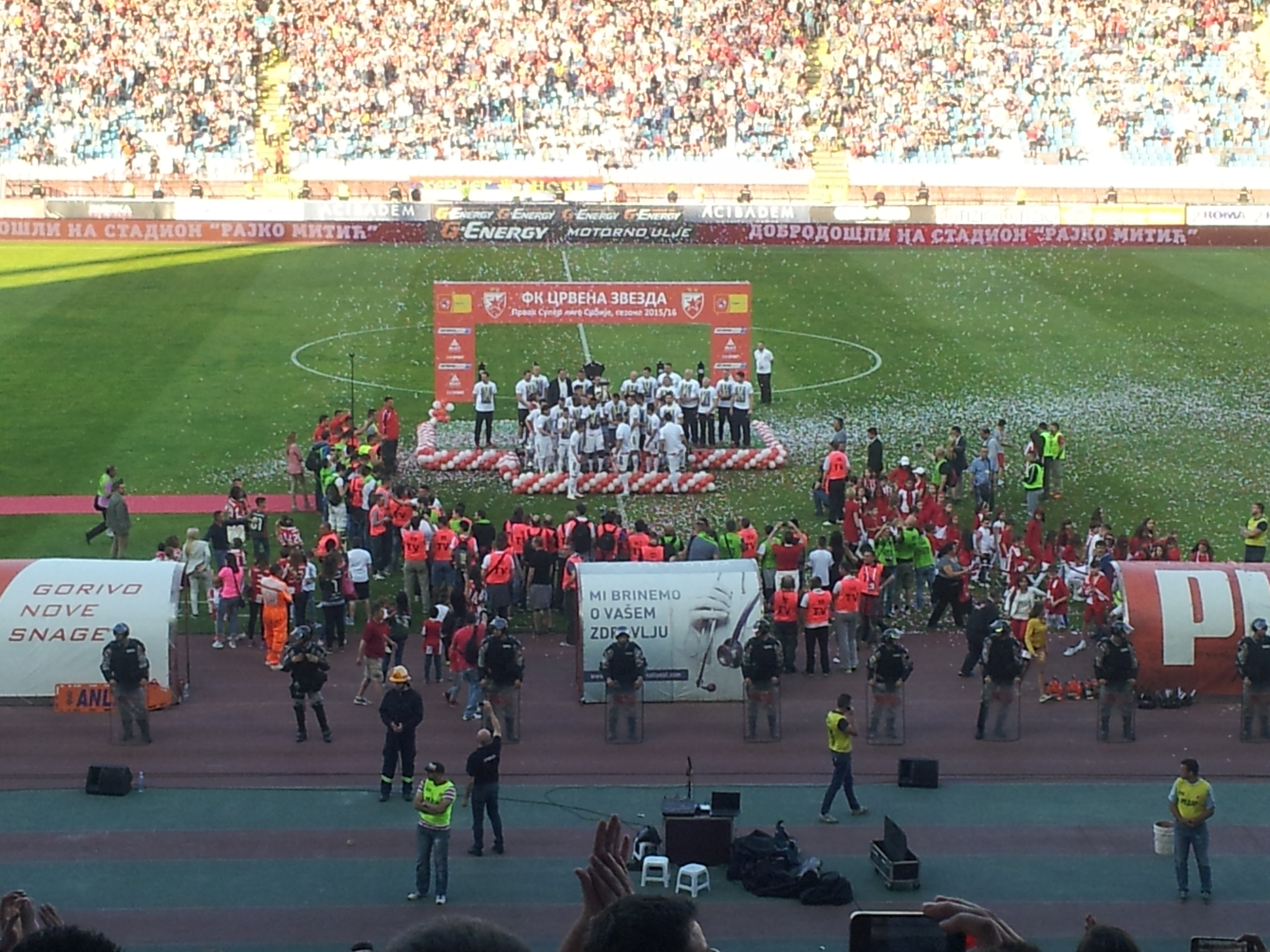
League champions Red Star Belgrade on 21 May 2016.

=== Championship round ===
The top eight teams advance from the regular season. Points from the regular season are halved with half points rounded up. Teams play each other once.

==== League table ====
Pos	Team	Pld	W	D	L	GF	GA	GD	Pts	Qualification
1	Red Star Belgrade (C)	37	30	5	2	97	27	+70	54	Qualification for the Champions League second qualifying round
2	Partizan	37	20	7	10	72	44	+28	40	Qualification for the Europa League second qualifying round (Note: Since the winners of the 2015–16 Serbian Cup, Partizan, qualified for European competition based on league position, the spot awarded to the second-placed team (Europa League first qualifying round) was passed to the fourth-placed team.)
3	Čukarički	37	19	8	10	48	35	+13	39	Qualification for the Europa League first qualifying round
4	Vojvodina	37	16	11	10	57	44	+13	36	Qualification for the Europa League first qualifying round
5	Radnički Niš	37	16	9	12	40	35	+5	35	
6	Borac Čačak	37	14	11	12	46	43	+3	30	
7	Voždovac	37	11	12	14	34	36	−2	25	
8	Radnik Surdulica	37	11	11	15	41	65	−24	25	

Source: UEFA, Soccerway
Rules for classification: 1) Points; 2) Points in regular season; 3) Head-to-head points in regular season; 4) Head-to-head goal difference in regular season; 5) Head-to-head away goals scored in regular season (if two teams tied); 6) Goal difference; 7) Goals scored; 8) Fair-play ranking; 9) Play-off (if two teams tied); 10) Draw (if three or more teams tied).
(Note: Criterion 9 is only used if deciding Champion and places for European competitions.)
(C) Champions

==== Results ====
Home \ Away	BOR	ČUK	PAR	RNI	RSU	RSB	VOJ	VŽD
Borac Čačak				4–1	3–1	1–5		0–0
Čukarički	3–1			1–5	2–1		1–2	
Partizan	2–0	1–2					3–2	2–1
Radnički Niš			1–0		5–1			2–0
Radnik Surdulica			0–4			1–4	1–0	
Red Star Belgrade		1–2	1–1	2–0			1–3	
Vojvodina	2–0			4–0				0–0
Voždovac		2–0			1–2	0–1		

Legend: Blue = home team win; Yellow = draw; Red = away team win.

=== Relegation round ===
The bottom eight teams from the regular season play in the relegation round. Points from the regular season are halved with half points rounded up. Teams play each other once.

==== League table ====
Pos	Team	Pld	W	D	L	GF	GA	GD	Pts	Relegation
9	Mladost Lučani	37	11	14	12	34	44	−10	31	
10	Spartak Subotica	37	11	11	15	37	42	−5	29	
11	Metalac Gornji Milanovac	37	10	15	12	41	48	−7	28	
12	Rad	37	9	13	15	40	47	−7	27	
13	Javor Ivanjica	37	10	13	14	25	29	−4	26	
14	Novi Pazar	37	10	10	17	29	50	−21	25	
15	OFK Beograd (R)	37	9	5	23	38	58	−20	18	Relegation to the Serbian First League
16	Jagodina (R)	37	5	13	19	29	61	−32	15	Relegation to the Serbian First League

Source: UEFA, Soccerway
Rules for classification: 1) Points; 2) Points in regular season; 3) Head-to-head points in regular season; 4) Head-to-head goal difference in regular season; 5) Head-to-head away goals scored in regular season (if two teams tied); 6) Goal difference; 7) Goals scored; 8) Fair-play ranking; 9) Play-off (if two teams tied); 10) Draw (if three or more teams tied).
(Note: Criteria 9 is only used if deciding places for relegation.)
(R) Relegated

==== Results ====
Home \ Away	JAG	JAV	MET	MLA	NPZ	OFK	RAD	SPA
Jagodina		0–0		0–1			1–1	
Javor Ivanjica			1–1	0–1		1–0		0–2
Metalac Gornji Milanovac	2–1			2–2	4–2	1–1		
Mladost Lučani					1–0	3–1	1–3	0–0
Novi Pazar	3–2	0–2					1–0	0–1
OFK Beograd	6–2				1–2			1–3
Rad		1–0	1–1			2–1		
Spartak Subotica	5–1		5–1				1–2	

Legend: Blue = home team win; Yellow = draw; Red = away team win.

== Individual statistics ==
=== Top scorers ===
As of matches played on 22 May 2016.

Pos	Scorer	Team	Goals
1	(Serbia) Aleksandar Katai	Red Star	21
2	(Portugal) Hugo Vieira	Red Star	20
3	(Bulgaria) Valeri Bojinov	Partizan	18
3	(Serbia) Andrija Pavlović	Čukarički	18
5	(Serbia) Srđan Vujaklija	Borac	15

== Hat-tricks ==
Player	For	Against	Result	Date
(Serbia) Andrija Pavlović	Čukarički	Vojvodina	4–0	21 July 2015
(Serbia) Slavoljub Srnić	Red Star	Vojvodina	3–0	21 October 2015
(Serbia) Filip Knežević	Borac Čačak	Radnik Surdulica	4–2	28 November 2015
(Portugal) Hugo Vieira	Red Star	Radnik Surdulica	5–0	12 December 2015
(Serbia) Nenad Marinković	Voždovac	Mladost Lučani	4–1	5 March 2016
(Serbia) Andrija Pavlović	Čukarički	Borac	3–1	15 April 2016
(Serbia) Stefan Ilić	Spartak	Metalac	5–1	23 April 2016
(Serbia) Saša Marjanović^{5}	Radnički Niš	Radnik	5–1	28 April 2016
(Serbia) Đuro Zec	Borac Čačak	Radnički Niš	4–1	3 May 2016
(Serbia) Aleksandar Katai	Red Star	Borac Čačak	5–1	18 May 2016
(Serbia) Milan Stojanović	Metalac	Novi Pazar	4–2	21 May 2016

^{5} Player scored five goals

== Awards ==
=== Team of the Season ===

Serbian SuperLiga Team of the Year

Position	Player	Team
GK	(Serbia) Damir Kahriman	Red Star
DR	(Serbia) Filip Stojković	Čukarički
DC	(Serbia) Aleksandar Luković	Red Star
DC	(Serbia) Bojan Ostojić	Čukarički
DL	(Argentina) Luis Ibáñez	Red Star
MR	(Serbia) Aleksandar Katai	Red Star
AM	(Serbia) Marko Grujić	Red Star
MC	(Netherlands) Mitchell Donald	Red Star
ML	(Serbia) Nemanja Mihajlović	Partizan
FW	(Portugal) Hugo Vieira	Red Star
FW	(Serbia) Andrija Pavlović	Čukarički

=== Player of the season ===
- (Portugal) Hugo Vieira (Red Star Belgrade)

=== Head coach of the season ===
- (Montenegro) Miodrag Božović (Red Star Belgrade)

== Attendances ==
No.	Club	Average
1	Crvena zvezda	16,983
2	Partizan	4,332
3	Radnički Niš	3,078
4	Novi Pazar	2,932
5	Vojvodina	2,061
6	Radnik	2,044
7	Metalac	1,737
8	Borac Čačak	1,295
9	Jagodina	1,183
10	Javor	958
11	Zlatibor Voda	767
12	Mladost Lučani	674
13	Čukarički	668
14	Rad	639
15	Voždovac	556
16	OFK	486
