= 2012–13 FK Partizan season =

Partizan Belgrade
2012–13 season
- President: Dragan Đurić
- Head coach: Vladimir Vermezović (until 29 April 2013); Vuk Rašović
- Stadium: Partizan Stadium
- Serbian SuperLiga: 1st
- Serbian Cup: Round of 16
- UEFA Europa League: Group stage
- Top goalscorer: League: Aleksandar Mitrović (10); All: Aleksandar Mitrović (15)
- Highest home attendance: vs Red Star Belgrade (30,000)
- Lowest home attendance: vs Rad (1,500)
Home colours	Away colours	Third colours

The 2012–13 season was FK Partizan's 7th season in Serbian SuperLiga.

== Players ==
=== Squad information ===
Note: Flags indicate national team as defined under FIFA eligibility rules; some limited exceptions apply. Players may hold more than one non-FIFA nationality.

No.	Pos.	Nation	Player
1	GK	SRB	Živko Živković
2	DF	SRB	Aleksandar Miljković
3	DF	MNE	Vladimir Volkov
5	DF	MNE	Žarko Tomašević
6	DF	SRB	Vojislav Stanković
7	MF	SRB	Predrag Luka
8	MF	SRB	Goran Lovre
9	FW	SRB	Nemanja Kojić
10	MF	BRA	Eliomar
11	MF	SRB	Nikola Ninković
14	MF	SRB	Darko Brašanac
15	DF	BUL	Ivan Ivanov
17	DF	SRB	Andrija Živković
18	DF	SRB	Aleksandar Lazevski
19	DF	SRB	Branko Pauljević
20	MF	SRB	Dejan Babić

No.	Pos.	Nation	Player
21	MF	SRB	Saša Marković
22	MF	SRB	Saša Ilić (captain)
23	DF	SRB	Tomislav Pajović
24	DF	SRB	Marko Živković
30	GK	SRB	Nikola Petrović
37	DF	SRB	Stefan Aškovski
39	MF	SRB	Miloš Jojić
40	DF	SRB	Miloš Ostojić
44	FW	SRB	Marko Šćepović
45	FW	SRB	Aleksandar Mitrović
50	FW	SRB	Lazar Marković
55	MF	SRB	Danilo Pantić
77	MF	SRB	Filip Knežević
88	GK	SRB	Vladimir Stojković
98	MF	MNE	Petar Kaluđerović
99	MF	SRB	Milan Smiljanić

=== Squad statistics ===
No.	Name	League		Cup		Europe		Total		Discipline	
No.	Name	Apps	Goals	Apps	Goals	Apps	Goals	Apps	Goals	Yellow card	Red card
Goalkeepers
1	(Serbia) Živko Živković	1	0	0	0	0	0	1	0	0	0
30	(Serbia) Nikola Petrović	9	-8	2	-3	5	-7	16	-18	0	1
88	(Serbia) Vladimir Stojković	21	-7(1)	0	0	7	-8	28	-15	1	0
Defenders
2	(Serbia) Aleksandar Miljković	24	0	0	0	8	0	32	0	5	0
3	(Montenegro) Vladimir Volkov	12	1	2	0	10	0	24	1	4	0
5	(Montenegro) Žarko Tomašević	0	0	0	0	0	0	0	0	0	0
6	(Serbia) Vojislav Stanković	7	0	2	0	0	0	9	0	2	1
15	(Bulgaria) Ivan Ivanov	29	4	0	0	12	2	41	6	2	0
18	(North Macedonia) Aleksandar Lazevski	17	0	0	0	2	0	19	0	4	0
19	(Serbia) Branko Pauljević	5	0	2	0	0	0	7	0	0	0
23	(Serbia) Tomislav Pajović	12	0	0	0	0	0	12	0	5	1
24	(Serbia) Marko Živković	2	0	0	0	0	0	2	0	0	0
37	(North Macedonia) Stefan Aškovski	1	0	2	2	0	0	3	2	0	0
40	(Serbia) Miloš Ostojić	13	1	0	0	11	1	24	2	3	0
Midfielders
7	(Serbia) Predrag Luka	14	3	0	0	0	0	14	3	2	0
8	(Serbia) Goran Lovre	4	0	2	0	2	0	8	0	0	0
10	(Brazil) Eliomar	7	0	0	0	0	0	7	0	0	0
11	(Serbia) Nikola Ninković	21	4	1	0	5	0	27	4	5	0
14	(Serbia) Darko Brašanac	11	1	2	1	0	0	13	2	1	0
17	(Serbia) Andrija Živković	1	0	0	0	0	0	1	0	0	0
20	(Serbia) Dejan Babić	2	0	0	0	0	0	2	0	0	0
21	(Serbia) Saša Marković	17	2	2	0	11	2	30	4	4	0
22	(Serbia) Saša Ilić (captain)	25	5	0	0	12	0	37	5	5	0
39	(Serbia) Miloš Jojić	20	4	1	0	6	0	27	4	1	0
50	(Serbia) Lazar Marković	19	6	0	0	12	0	31	6	3	0
55	(Serbia) Danilo Pantić	1	0	0	0	0	0	1	0	0	0
77	(Serbia) Filip Knežević	1	0	0	0	1	0	2	0	0	0
99	(Serbia) Milan Smiljanic	24	1	1	0	6	0	31	1	4	0
Forwards
9	(Serbia) Nemanja Kojić	13	5	0	0	0	0	13	5	0	0
44	(Serbia) Marko Šćepović	17	6	2	0	4	0	23	6	2	0
45	(Serbia) Aleksandar Mitrović	25	10	2	2	9	3	36	15	6	0
Players sold or loaned out during the season
25	(Serbia) Stefan Babović	0	0	0	0	5	0	5	0	0	0
13	(Serbia) Nikola Aksentijević	3	0	0	0	5	0	8	0	1	0
10	(Serbia) Zvonimir Vukić	0	0	0	0	2	0	2	0	0	0
7	(Serbia) Nemanja Tomić	13	3	0	0	11	4	24	7	2	0
17	(Serbia) Sreten Sretenović	1	0	2	0	0	0	3	0	0	0
12	(Serbia) Stefan Šćepović	14	8	1	0	10	1	25	9	1	0
27	(Libya) Mohamed Zubya	4	1	1	0	4	0	9	1	1	0
4	(Sierra Leone) Medo	8	0	0	0	6	0	14	0	3	0

=== Top scorers ===
Includes all competitive matches. The list is sorted by shirt number when total goals are equal.

Position	Nation	Number	Name	League	Cup	Europe	Total
1	(Serbia)	45	Aleksandar Mitrović	10	2	3	15
2	(Serbia)	12	Stefan Šćepović	8	0	1	9
3	(Serbia)	7	Nemanja Tomić	3	0	4	7

== Transfers ==
=== In ===
Date	Position	Name	From	Type
23 May 2012	DF	(Serbia) Branko Pauljević	(Serbia) Hajduk Kula	Transfer
6 June 2012	DF	(Serbia) Stefan Savić	Promoted from youth squad	Sign
8 June 2012	FW	(Serbia) Stefan Šćepović	(Israel) Hapoel Acre	Unattached
9 June 2012	MF	(Serbia) Goran Lovre	(England) Barnsley	Unattached
11 June 2012	FW	(Libya) Mohamed Zubya	(Kuwait) Al-Arabi	Transfer
15 June 2012	MF	(Serbia) Filip Knežević	(Serbia) Borac Čačak	Transfer
27 June 2012	MF	(Serbia) Filip Marković	(Serbia) Teleoptik	Sign
27 June 2012	DF	(North Macedonia) Stefan Aškovski	(Serbia) Teleoptik	Sign
27 June 2012	FW	(Serbia) Aleksandar Mitrović	(Serbia) Teleoptik	Sign
28 August 2012	DF	(Serbia) Sreten Sretenović	(Slovenia) Olimpija Ljubljana	Transfer
14 September 2012	DF	(Montenegro) Žarko Tomašević	(Portugal) C.D. Nacional	Transfer
12 October 2012	GK	(Serbia) Živko Živković	(Serbia) Teleoptik	Loan Recall
17 January 2013	MF	(Brazil) Eliomar	(Serbia) Javor	Transfer
1 February 2013	MF	(Serbia) Predrag Luka	(Serbia) Rad	Transfer
1 February 2013	FW	(Serbia) Nemanja Kojić	(Serbia) Rad	Transfer
7 February 2013	DF	(Serbia) Tomislav Pajović	(Moldova) Sheriff	Loan
8 February 2013	DF	(Serbia) Marko Živković	(Serbia) Teleoptik	Sign
19 April 2013	MF	(Serbia) Andrija Živković	Promoted from youth squad	Sign
24 May 2013	MF	(Serbia) Danilo Pantić	Promoted from youth squad	Sign

=== Out ===
Date	Position	Name	To	Type
25 Mаy 2012	FW	(Senegal) Lamine Diarra	(Turkey) Antalyaspor	Transfer
28 Mаy 2012	DF	(Serbia) Nemanja Rnić	(Ukraine) FC Hoverla Uzhhorod	Transfer
12 June 2012	MF	(Serbia) Aleksandar Davidov	(Israel) Bnei Sakhnin F.C.	Loan
21 June 2012	FW	(Serbia) Nikola Trujić	(Serbia) FK Napredak Kruševac	Loan
30 June 2012	DF	(Montenegro) Igor Zonjić	(Serbia) Teleoptik	Loan
10 August 2012	GK	(Serbia) Živko Živković	(Serbia) Teleoptik	Loan
10 August 2012	DF	(Serbia) Stefan Savić	(Serbia) Teleoptik	Loan
14 August 2012	DF	(Brazil) Anderson Marques	(Brazil) Atlético Monte Azul	Transfer
20 August 2012	FW	(Central African Republic) David Manga	(Israel) Hapoel Ramat Gan	Loan
26 August 2012	MF	(Serbia) Stefan Babović	(Spain) Real Zaragoza	Transfer
31 August 2012	DF	(Serbia) Nikola Aksentijević	(Netherlands) Vitesse Arnhem	Transfer
1 January 2013	MF	(Serbia) Zvonimir Vukić	(Greece) PAOK	Transfer
3 January 2013	MF	(Serbia) Nemanja Tomić	(Turkey) Gençlerbirliği	Transfer
5 January 2013	DF	(Serbia) Sreten Sretenović	(South Korea) Busan	Transfer
9 January 2013	GK	(Serbia) Radiša Ilić	(Serbia) Partizan GK coach	Retired
16 January 2013	FW	(Brazil) Eduardo	(Brazil) São Caetano	Loan
26 January 2013	FW	(Serbia) Stefan Šćepović	(Israel) Ashdod	Loan
27 January 2013	FW	(Libya) Mohamed Zubya	Unattached	Released
31 January 2013	MF	(Sierra Leone) Medo	(England) Bolton	Transfer

For recent transfers, see List of Serbian football transfers summer 2012 and List of Serbian football transfers winter 2012–13.

== Competitions ==
=== Overview ===
Competition	Record							
Competition	P	W	D	L	GF	GA	GD	Win %
Superliga	30	23	4	3	71	16	+55	76.67
Serbian Cup	2	1	0	1	5	3	+2	50.00
UEFA Europa League	12	3	3	6	13	15	−2	25.00
Total	44	27	7	10	89	34	+55	61.36

	Competition	Position
(Serbia)	Serbian SuperLiga	Winners
(Serbia)	Serbian Cup	Last 16
(European Union)	UEFA Champions League	Third qualifying round
(European Union)	UEFA Europa League	Group stage

=== Serbian SuperLiga ===
==== League table ====
Pos	Team	Pld	W	D	L	GF	GA	GD	Pts	Qualification or relegation
1	Partizan (C)	30	23	4	3	71	16	+55	73	Qualification for Champions League second qualifying round
2	Red Star Belgrade	30	20	2	8	55	35	+20	62	Qualification for Europa League second qualifying round
3	Vojvodina	30	17	10	3	40	20	+20	61	Qualification for Europa League first qualifying round
4	Jagodina	30	15	5	10	35	26	+9	50	Qualification for Europa League second qualifying round
5	Sloboda Užice	30	11	12	7	39	37	+2	45	

Source: Serbian SuperLiga
Rules for classification: 1) points; 2) head-to-head points; 3) head-to-head goal difference; 4) head-to-head goals scored; 5) goal difference; 6) number of goals scored.
(C) Champions

==== Results and positions by round ====
Round	1	2	3	4	5	6	7	8	9	10	11	12	13	14	15	16	17	18	19	20	21	22	23	24	25	26	27	28	29	30
Ground	H	A	H	A	H	H	A	H	A	H	A	H	A	H	A	A	H	A	H	A	A	H	A	H	A	H	A	H	A	H
Result	W	L	W	W	W	W	W	W	W	W	W	W	L	W	D	W	W	W	W	D	D	L	W	W	D	W	W	W	W	W
Position	1	7	4	3	2	2	2	1	1	1	1	1	1	1	1	1	1	1	1	1	1	1	1	1	1	1	1	1	1	1

Updated to match(es) played on 20 April 2013. Source: superliga.rs
A = Away; H = Home; W = Win; D = Draw; L = Loss

==== Matches ====
11 August 2012 1	Partizan	7–0	BSK Borča	Belgrade
20:00 CET	Ivanov 25'; Ilić 47'; Zubya 48'; Ninković 66'; S. Šćepović 74'; L. Marković 84'; Stojković 84' (pen.)	Report		Stadium: Stadion Partizana; Attendance: 2,000; Referee: Novica Anđelovski

18 August 2012 2	Donji Srem	2–1	Partizan	Novi Sad
20:00 CET	Lovre 27' (o.g.); Damnjanović 29'	Report	S. Marković 78'	Stadium: Stadion Karađorđe; Attendance: - Referee: Ninoslav Spasić

26 August 2012 3	Partizan	1–0	Jagodina	Belgrade
19:00 CET	Mitrović 41'	Report		Stadium: Stadion Partizana; Attendance: 2,000; Referee: Dejan Santrač

3 September 2012 4	OFK Beograd	1–3	Partizan	Belgrade
17:00 CET	Brkić 40'	Report	L. Marković 50'; S. Šćepović 71', 81'	Stadium: Omladinski Stadion; Attendance: 2,000; Referee: Boško Jovanetić

15 September 2012 5	Partizan	5–2	Hajduk Kula	Belgrade
21:00 CET	Kovačević 33' (o.g.); Tomić 37'; Jojić 47'; Mitrović 55'; S. Šćepović 59'	Report	Sekulić 71'; Veselinović 77' (pen.)	Stadium: Stadion Partizana; Attendance: 3,568; Referee: Darko Bogdanović

23 September 2012 6	Partizan	5–0	Sloboda Užice	Belgrade
18:00 CET	L. Marković 20'; Ninković 38'; M. Šćepović 68', 90'; Ivanov 77'	Report		Stadium: Stadion Partizana; Attendance: 3,273; Referee: Aleksandar Vasić

29 September 2012 7	Vojvodina	0–3	Partizan	Novi Sad
14:00 CET		Report	Ostojić 4'; Ilić 62'; S. Marković 84'	Stadium: Stadion Karađorđe; Attendance: 6,500; Referee: Milorad Mažić

7 October 2012 8	Partizan	2–1	Javor	Belgrade
17:00 CET	S. Šćepović 6'; Mitrović 76'	Report	Onyilo 35'	Stadium: Stadion Partizana; Attendance: 3,000; Referee: Srđan Obradović

20 October 2012 9	Rad	0–1	Partizan	Belgrade
12:30 CET		Report	Ivanov 10'	Stadium: Stadion Obilića; Attendance: 1,500; Referee: Milan Karadžić

28 October 2012 10	Partizan	3–1	Novi Pazar	Belgrade
17:00 CET	S. Šćepović 21'; L. Marković 54'; M. Šćepović 56'	Report	Alivodić 61'	Stadium: Stadion Partizana; Attendance: 2,000; Referee: Danilo Mihajlović

3 November 2012 11	Radnički Niš	0–4	Partizan	Niš
13:30 CET		Report	Kolarević 10' (o.g.); S. Šćepović 59'; Jojić 72'; Ninković 83'	Stadium: Čair; Attendance: 10,000; Referee: Miodrag Gogić

11 November 2012 12	Partizan	2–0	Radnički 1923	Belgrade
17:00 CET	Ivanov 24'; L. Marković 49'	Report		Stadium: Stadion Partizana; Attendance: - Referee: Vlado Glodjović

17 November 2012 13	Red Star	3–2	Partizan	Belgrade
19:00 CET	Kasalica 14'; Milivojević 49'; Milijaš 74'	Report	Mitrović 9'; Jovanović 16' (o.g.)	Stadium: Marakana; Attendance: 44,155; Referee: Milorad Mažić

25 November 2012 14	Partizan	4–0	Smederevo	Belgrade
19:00 CET	Tomić 28', 48'; Mitrović 30'; Smiljanić 87'	Report		Stadium: Stadion Partizana; Attendance: 2,000; Referee: Danilo Grujić

1 December 2012 15	Spartak ZV	2–2	Partizan	Subotica
13:00 CET	Nosković 79'; Bratić 83'	Report	L. Marković 12'; M. Šćepović 57'	Stadium: Gradski Stadion; Attendance: 3,500; Referee: Miodrag Gogić

2 March 2013 17	Partizan	2–0	Donj Srem	Belgrade
19:00 CET	Luka 39', 48'; M. Šćepović 50'	Report		Stadium: Stadion Partizana; Attendance: 8,576; Referee: Srđan Obradović

6 March 2013 16	BSK Borča	0–4	Partizan	Belgrade
13:00 CET		Report	Kojić 8', 63'; Mitrović 35'; Brašanac 76'	Stadium: Vizelj Park; Attendance: 3,000; Referee: Milan Jeremić

9 March 2013 18	Jagodina	0–1	Partizan	Jagodina
19:00 CET		Report	Kojić 45'	Stadium: Gradski Stadion; Attendance: 8,000; Referee: Dejan Santrač

17 March 2013 19	Partizan	2–0	OFK Beograd	Belgrade
18:00 CET	Mitrović 48'; Luka 59'	Report		Stadium: Stadion Partizana; Attendance: 6,754; Referee: Novica Anđelovski

31 March 2013 20	Hajduk Kula	1–1	Partizan	Kula
15:00 CET	Veselinović 33'	Report	Mitrović 24'	Stadium: Stadion Hajduk; Attendance: 3,000; Referee: Nenad Đokić

4 April 2013 21	Sloboda Užice	0–0	Partizan	Užice
16:00 CET		Report		Stadium: Gradski Stadion Užice; Attendance: 8,000; Referee: Vlado Glodjović

7 April 2013 22	Partizan	1–2	Vojvodina	Belgrade
19:00 CET	Jojić 82'	Report	Oumarou 43'; Alivodić 56'	Stadium: Stadion Partizana; Attendance: 14,217; Referee: Milorad Mažić

13 April 2013 23	Javor	0–1	Partizan	Ivanjica
14:00 CET		Report	Ilić 2' (pen.)	Stadium: Stadion Ivanjica; Attendance: 3,000; Referee: Miodrag Gogić

20 April 2013 24	Partizan	2–0	Rad	Belgrade
19:00 CET	Ilić 8'; Kojić 41'	Report		Stadium: Stadion Partizana; Attendance: 10,000; Referee: Boško Jovanetić

28 April 2013 25	Novi Pazar	0–0	Partizan	Novi Pazar
17:00 CET		Report		Stadium: Gradski Stadion; Attendance: 4,000; Referee: Danilo Grujić

2 May 2013 26	Partizan	3–1	Radnički Niš	Belgrade
18:30 CET	Volkov 16'; Mitrović 77', 90+1'	Report	Binić 51'	Stadium: Stadion Partizana; Attendance: 6,751; Referee: Darko Bogdanović

11 May 2013 27	Radnički 1923	0–1	Partizan	Kragujevac
15:00 CET		Report	Ilić 68'	Stadium: Čika Dača; Attendance: 5,000; Referee: Dejan Santrač

18 May 2013 28	Partizan	1–0	Red Star	Belgrade
19:30 CET	Jojić 90'	Report		Stadium: Stadion Partizana; Attendance: 30,000; Referee: Milorad Mažić

22 May 2013 29	Smederevo	0–2	Partizan	Smederevo
17:00 CET		Report	M. Šćepović 17'; Kojić 67'	Stadium: Smederevo City Stadium; Attendance: 4,000; Referee: Vlado Glodjović

26 May 2013 30	Partizan	5–0	Spartak ZV	Belgrade
19:00 CET	L. Marković 28'; M. Šćepović 36'; Ninković 80'; Kojić 83'; Luka 90'	Report		Stadium: Stadion Partizana; Attendance: 20,000; Referee: Vladimir Nedeljković

=== Serbian Cup ===
26 September 2012 FR	Partizan	4–1	Proleter Novi Sad	Belgrade
18:00 CET	Mitrović 3', 39'; Brašanac 6'; Aškovski 28'	Report	Obradović 60'	Stadium: Stadion Partizana; Attendance: 2,536; Referee: Dejan Dimitrijević

31 October 2012 L16	Partizan	1–2	Borac Čačak	Belgrade
16:00 CET	Aškovski 31'	Report	Maslać 12'; Jevtović 21'	Stadium: Stadion Partizana; Attendance: 1,000; Referee: Novak Simović

=== UEFA Champions League ===
==== Qualifying phase ====
17 July 2012 2nd qualifying round 1st leg	Valletta (Malta)	1–4	(Serbia) Partizan	Paola, Malta
20:45 CET	Mifsud 65'	Report	Tomić 6'; Ivan Ivanov 33'; S. Šćepović 42'; M.Ostojić 71'	Stadium: Hibernians Ground, Paola; Attendance: 1,436; Referee: Liran Liany (Israel)

24 July 2012 2nd qualifying round 2nd leg	Partizan (Serbia)	3–1 (7–2 agg.)	(Malta) Valletta	Belgrade, Serbia
20:45 CET	Tomić 10', 67'; Mitrović 73'	Report	Mifsud 60'	Stadium: Partizan Stadium, Belgrade; Attendance: 8,754; Referee: Anastasios Sidiropoulos (Greece)

31 July 2012 3rd qualifying round 1st leg	AEL Limassol (Cyprus)	1–0	(Serbia) Partizan	Larnaca, Cyprus
19:45 CET	Vouho 13'	Report		Stadium: Antonis Papadopoulos Stadium; Attendance: 6,940; Referee: Stanislav Todorov (Bulgaria)

8 August 2012 3rd qualifying round 2nd leg	Partizan (Serbia)	0–1 (0–2 agg.)	(Cyprus) AEL Limassol	Belgrade, Serbia
20:45 CET		Report	Dossa Júnior 23'	Stadium: Partizan Stadium; Attendance: 17,257; Referee: Tasos Sidiropoulos (Greece)

=== UEFA Europa League ===
==== Play-off round ====
23 August 2012 Play-off Round 1st leg	Tromsø (Norway)	3–2	(Serbia) Partizan	Tromsø, Norway
18:30 CET	Prijović 37'; Björck 77'; Mbodj 82'	Report	S. Marković 43'; Mitrović 84'	Stadium: Alfheim Stadion; Attendance: 3,386; Referee: Robert Schörgenhofer (Austria)

30 August 2012 Play-off Round 2nd leg	Partizan (Serbia)	1–0 (3–3 a agg.)	(Norway) Tromsø	Belgrade, Serbia
20:45 CET	Ivanov 75'	Report		Stadium: Stadion Partizana; Attendance: 14,725; Referee: Serge Gumienny (Belgium)

==== Group ====
Pos	Team	Pld	W	D	L	GF	GA	GD	Pts	Qualification
1	(Russia) Rubin Kazan	6	4	2	0	10	3	+7	14	Advance to knockout phase
2	(Italy) Internazionale	6	3	2	1	11	9	+2	11	Advance to knockout phase
3	(Serbia) Partizan	6	0	3	3	3	8	−5	3 (Note: Tied on head-to-head points (2) and head-to-head goal difference (0). Head-to-head away goals: Partizan 1, Neftçi 0.)	
4	(Azerbaijan) Neftçi	6	0	3	3	4	8	−4	3	

Source: Soccerway
Notes:

20 September 2012 1	Partizan (Serbia)	0–0	(Azerbaijan) Neftchi Baku	Belgrade, Serbia
21:05		Report		Stadium: Partizan Stadium; Attendance: 18,000; Referee: Libor Kovařík (Czech Republic)

4 October 2012 2	Rubin Kazan (Russia)	2–0	(Serbia) Partizan	Kazan, Russia
18:00	Karadeniz 45'; Ryazantsev 48'	Report		Stadium: Central Stadium; Attendance: 10,443; Referee: Anastassios Kakos (Greece)

25 October 2012 3	Internazionale (Italy)	1–0	(Serbia) Partizan	Milan, Italy
19:00	Palacio 88'	Report		Stadium: San Siro; Attendance: 18,626; Referee: Liran Liany (Israel)

8 November 2012 4	Partizan (Serbia)	1–3	(Italy) Internazionale	Belgrade, Serbia
21:05	Tomić 90+1'	Report	Palacio 51', 75'; Guarín 87'	Stadium: Partizan Stadium; Attendance: 17,186; Referee: Duarte Gomes (Portugal)

22 November 2012 5	Neftchi Baku (Azerbaijan)	1–1	(Serbia) Partizan	Baku, Azerbaijan
18:00	Flavinho 10'	Report	Mitrović 67'	Stadium: Tofiq Bahramov Stadium; Attendance: 8,992; Referee: Simon Lee Evans (Wales)

6 December 2012 6	Partizan (Serbia)	1–1	(Russia) Rubin Kazan	Belgrade, Serbia
21:05	S. Marković 53'	Report	Rondón 59'	Stadium: Partizan Stadium; Attendance: 5,233; Referee: Martin Hansson (Sweden)

== Friendlies ==
Date	Opponents	Result	Scorers
30 June 2012	(Slovenia) Aluminij	4–2	Brašanac 7', Jojić 12', Ilić 67', Aškovski 84'
1 July 2012	(Austria) Wiener Neustadt	2–1	S. Šćepović 11', Tomić 45'
3 July 2012	(Austria) Pöllau	3–0	Jojić 39', Brašanac 42', Knežević 83'
4 July 2012	(Ukraine) Zorya Luhansk	1–0	Ilić 39'
6 July 2012	(Hungary) Videoton	2–2	Babić 47', S. Marković 80'
7 July 2012	(Austria) Sturm Graz	3–2	Babović 59', S. Marković 64', Zubya 80'
10 July 2012	(Russia) Lokomotiv Moscow	0–2	
26 January 2013	(Switzerland) Zürich	1–2	Petrović 80'
27 January 2013	(Ukraine) Sevastopol	1–2	M. Šćepović 90'
28 January 2013	(South Korea) Pohang Steelers	1–3	M. Šćepović 6'
30 January 2013	(Ukraine) Karpaty Lviv	1–0	M. Šćepović 32'
1 February 2013	(Austria) Admira	1–1	Jojić 44'
3 February 2013	(China) Jiangsu	3–2	Mitrović 5', 66', M. Šćepović 56'
5 February 2013	(Bulgaria) Litex	1–1	Ninković 11'
6 February 2013	(China) Shandong	1–0	L. Marković 37'
16 February 2013	(Slovenia) Gorica	1–1	M. Šćepović 45+1'
19 February 2013	(Slovenia) Koper	2–1	Miljković 21', M. Šćepović 72'

== Sponsors ==
Kit sponsors
- Kit manufacturer: (Germany) Adidas
- General sponsor: (Serbia) Lav pivo
- Other sponsor: (France) Renault

== See also ==
- List of FK Partizan seasons
