= 2011–12 FK Partizan season =

Partizan
2011–12 season
- President: Dragan Đurić
- Head coach: Aleksandar Stanojević (until 12 January 2012); Avram Grant
- Serbian SuperLiga: 1st
- Serbian Cup: Semi-finals
- UEFA Europa League: Play-off round
- Top goalscorer: League: Zvonimir Vukić (13); All: Zvonimir Vukić (17)
- Highest home attendance: vs Genk (27,553)
- Lowest home attendance: vs Borac (2,000)
| Home colours | Away colours | Third colours |

The 2011–12 season is FK Partizan's 6th season in Serbian SuperLiga. This article shows player statistics and all matches (official and friendly) that the club have and will play during the 2011–12 season.

== Players ==
=== Squad information ===
Note: Flags indicate national team as defined under FIFA eligibility rules; some limited exceptions apply. Players may hold more than one non-FIFA nationality.

| No. | Pos. | Nation | Player |
|---|---|---|---|
| 2 | DF | SRB | Aleksandar Miljković |
| 3 | DF | SRB | Vladimir Volkov |
| 4 | MF | SLE | Medo |
| 6 | DF | SRB | Vojislav Stanković |
| 7 | MF | SRB | Nemanja Tomić |
| 9 | FW | BRA | Eduardo |
| 10 | MF | SRB | Zvonimir Vukic |
| 11 | MF | SRB | Nikola Ninković |
| 13 | DF | SRB | Nikola Aksentijević |
| 14 | FW | BIH | Vladimir Jovančić |
| 15 | DF | BUL | Ivan Ivanov |
| 17 | MF | CTA | David Manga |
| 18 | DF | MKD | Aleksandar Lazevski |

| No. | Pos. | Nation | Player |
|---|---|---|---|
| 20 | MF | SRB | Dejan Babić |
| 21 | MF | SRB | Saša Marković |
| 22 | MF | SRB | Saša Ilić (captain) |
| 24 | DF | SRB | Nemanja Rnić |
| 25 | MF | SRB | Stefan Babović |
| 26 | FW | SEN | Lamine Diarra |
| 30 | GK | SRB | Nikola Petrović |
| 31 | FW | SRB | Marko Šćepović |
| 40 | DF | SRB | Miloš Ostojić |
| 44 | DF | BRA | Anderson Marques |
| 50 | MF | SRB | Lazar Marković |
| 88 | GK | SRB | Vladimir Stojković |
| 99 | MF | SRB | Milan Smiljanić |

=== Squad statistics ===
| No. | Pos. | Name | League | | Cup | | Europe | | Total | | Discipline | |
| No. | Pos. | Name | Apps | Goals | Apps | Goals | Apps | Goals | Apps | Goals | Yellow card | Red card |
|---|---|---|---|---|---|---|---|---|---|---|---|---|
Goalkeepers
| 30 | GK | (Serbia) Nikola Petrović | 4 | 0 | 0 | 0 | 0 | 0 | 4 | 0 | 0 | 0 |
| 33 | GK | (Serbia) Radiša Ilić | 2 | 0 | 2 | 0 | 2 | 0 | 6 | 0 | 1 | 0 |
| 88 | GK | (Serbia) Vladimir Stojković | 24 | 0 | 3 | 0 | 4 | 0 | 31 | 0 | 3 | 0 |
Defenders
| 2 | DF | (Serbia) Aleksandar Miljković | 16 | 0 | 3 | 0 | 1 | 0 | 20 | 0 | 2 | 0 |
| 3 | DF | (Serbia) Vladimir Volkov | 23 | 1 | 2 | 0 | 5 | 1 | 29 | 2 | 3 | 0 |
| 6 | DF | (Serbia) Vojislav Stanković | 3 | 0 | 2 | 0 | 1 | 0 | 6 | 0 | 1 | 0 |
| 13 | DF | (Serbia) Nikola Aksentijević | 14 | 1 | 2 | 0 | 2 | 0 | 18 | 1 | 0 | 0 |
| 15 | DF | (Bulgaria) Ivan Ivanov | 28 | 4 | 3 | 0 | 6 | 0 | 39 | 4 | 0 | 0 |
| 18 | DF | (North Macedonia) Aleksandar Lazevski | 8 | 0 | 3 | 0 | 0 | 0 | 11 | 0 | 1 | 0 |
| 24 | DF | (Serbia) Nemanja Rnić | 23 | 0 | 4 | 0 | 4 | 0 | 32 | 0 | 4 | 0 |
| 40 | DF | (Serbia) Miloš Ostojić | 6 | 0 | 0 | 0 | 0 | 0 | 6 | 0 | 0 | 0 |
| 44 | DF | (Brazil) Anderson Marques | 1 | 1 | 1 | 0 | 0 | 0 | 2 | 1 | 0 | 0 |
Midfielders
| 4 | MF | (Sierra Leone) Medo | 26 | 0 | 4 | 0 | 6 | 0 | 36 | 0 | 5 | 1 |
| 7 | MF | (Serbia) Nemanja Tomić | 28 | 11 | 4 | 1 | 6 | 3 | 38 | 15 | 2 | 0 |
| 10 | MF | (Serbia) Zvonimir Vukić | 24 | 13 | 4 | 3 | 5 | 1 | 33 | 16 | 3 | 0 |
| 11 | MF | (Serbia) Nikola Ninković | 4 | 0 | 0 | 0 | 2 | 0 | 6 | 0 | 0 | 0 |
| 17 | MF | (Central African Republic) David Manga | 8 | 1 | 2 | 0 | 0 | 0 | 10 | 1 | 1 | 1 |
| 20 | MF | (Serbia) Dejan Babić | 2 | 0 | 0 | 0 | 1 | 0 | 3 | 0 | 0 | 0 |
| 21 | MF | (Serbia) Saša Marković | 8 | 1 | 2 | 0 | 2 | 0 | 12 | 1 | 2 | 0 |
| 22 | MF | (Serbia) Saša Ilić | 25 | 4 | 5 | 1 | 6 | 0 | 36 | 5 | 5 | 0 |
| 25 | MF | (Serbia) Stefan Babović | 28 | 4 | 4 | 1 | 5 | 0 | 37 | 5 | 6 | 1 |
| 99 | MF | (Serbia) Milan Smiljanić | 23 | 0 | 3 | 0 | 1 | 0 | 27 | 0 | 0 | 0 |
Forwards
| 9 | FW | (Brazil) Eduardo | 16 | 4 | 2 | 0 | 6 | 1 | 24 | 5 | 0 | 0 |
| 26 | FW | (Senegal) Lamine Diarra | 23 | 11 | 5 | 1 | 0 | 0 | 28 | 12 | 0 | 0 |
| 50 | FW | (Serbia) Lazar Marković | 26 | 6 | 3 | 1 | 4 | 0 | 32 | 7 | 1 | 0 |
| 31 | FW | (Serbia) Marko Šćepović | 9 | 4 | 2 | 0 | 4 | 1 | 15 | 5 | 0 | 0 |
Players sold or loaned out during the season
| 23 | MF | (Serbia) Aleksandar Davidov | 1 | 0 | 0 | 0 | 0 | 0 | 1 | 0 | 0 | 0 |
| 19 | FW | (Bosnia and Herzegovina) Vladimir Jovančić | 9 | 0 | 2 | 0 | 5 | 1 | 16 | 1 | 3 | 0 |
| 5 | MF | (Serbia) Aleksandar Ranković | 1 | 0 | 0 | 0 | 5 | 0 | 6 | 0 | 0 | 0 |

=== Top scorers ===
Includes all competitive matches. The list is sorted by shirt number when total goals are equal.

| Position | Nation | Number | Name | League | Cup | Europe | Total |
|---|---|---|---|---|---|---|---|
| 1 | (Serbia) | 10 | Zvonimir Vukić | 13 | 3 | 1 | 17 |
| 2 | (Serbia) | 7 | Nemanja Tomić | 11 | 1 | 3 | 15 |
| 3 | (Senegal) | 26 | Lamine Diarra | 12 | 1 | 0 | 13 |
| 4 | (Serbia) | 50 | Lazar Marković | 6 | 1 | 0 | 7 |

== Transfers ==
=== In ===
| Date | Position | Name | From | Type |
|---|---|---|---|---|
| 14 May 2011 | DF | (Serbia) Vladimir Volkov | (Moldova) Sheriff | Transfer |
| 3 June 2011 | FW | (Bosnia and Herzegovina) Vladimir Jovančić | (Serbia) Rad | Transfer |
| 9 June 2011 | MF | (Serbia) Saša Ivković | (Serbia) ČSK Pivara | Transfer |
| 10 June 2011 | MF | (Serbia) Dejan Babić | (Serbia) BSK Borča | Transfer |
| 15 June 2011 | MF | (Serbia) Saša Marković | (Serbia) OFK Beograd | Transfer |
| 17 June 2011 | DF | (Bulgaria) Ivan Ivanov | (Russia) Alania Vladikavkaz | Transfer |
| 22 June 2011 | FW | (Brazil) Eduardo | (Brazil) São Caetano | Transfer |
| 22 June 2011 | MF | (Serbia) Aleksandar Ranković | (Netherlands) ADO Den Haag | Transfer |
| 17 July 2011 | MF | (Serbia) Lazar Marković | Promoted from youth squad | Sign |
| 17 July 2011 | MF | (Serbia) Nikola Ninković | Promoted from youth squad | Sign |
| 18 July 2011 | DF | (Brazil) Anderson Marques | (Brazil) São Caetano | Transfer |
| 23 July 2011 | DF | (Serbia) Nemanja Rnić | (Belgium) Anderlecht | Transfer |
| 15 August 2011 | MF | (Central African Republic) David Manga | (Germany) 1860 München II | Transfer |
| 16 August 2011 | MF | (Serbia) Milan Smiljanić | (Spain) Espanyol | Transfer |
| 24 January 2012 | MF | (Serbia) Miloš Jojić | (Serbia) Teleoptik | Sign |
| 24 January 2012 | DF | (Serbia) Miloš Ostojić | (Serbia) Teleoptik | Sign |

=== Out ===
| Date | Position | Name | To | Type |
|---|---|---|---|---|
| 1 June 2011 | DF | (Serbia) Mladen Krstajić | Unattached | Retired |
| 9 June 2011 | MF | (Serbia) Saša Ivković | (Serbia) Teleoptik | Loan |
| 9 June 2011 | FW | (Brazil) Washington | Unattached | Released |
| 10 June 2011 | FW | (Serbia) Ivica Iliev | (Poland) Wisła Kraków | Transfer |
| 24 June 2011 | MF | (Serbia) Ljubomir Fejsa | (Greece) Olympiacos | Transfer |
| 7 July 2011 | DF | (Montenegro) Stefan Savić | (England) Manchester City | Transfer |
| 8 July 2011 | GK | (Serbia) Živko Živković | (Serbia) Metalac | Loan |
| 12 July 2011 | DF | (Serbia) Marko Jovanović | (Poland) Wisła Kraków | Transfer |
| 16 July 2011 | FW | (Serbia) Miloš Bogunović | (Serbia) Novi Pazar | Transfer |
| 9 August 2011 | MF | (Serbia) Radosav Petrović | (England) Blackburn Rovers | Transfer |
| 18 August 2011 | MF | (Serbia) Darko Brašanac | (Serbia) Smederevo | Loan |
| 8 September 2011 | MF | (Serbia) Aleksandar Davidov | (Israel) Hapoel Acre | Loan |
| 20 October 2011 | DF | (Uganda) Joseph Kizito | Unattached | Released |
| 15 December 2011 | FW | (Bosnia and Herzegovina) Vladimir Jovančić | (South Korea) Seongnam Ilhwa Chunma | Transfer |
| 17 January 2012 | DF | (Serbia) Aleksandar Ranković | Unattached | Released |
| 31 January 2012 | MF | (Serbia) Luka Stojanović | (Portugal) Sporting CP | Transfer |
| 3 February 2012 | DF | (Serbia) Radenko Kamberović | (Montenegro) Budućnost Podgorica | Transfer |
| 13 February 2012 | MF | (Serbia) Miloš Jojić | (Serbia) Teleoptik | Loan |

== Competitions ==
=== Overview ===
| Competition | Record | | | | | | | |
| Competition | P | W | D | L | GF | GA | GD | Win % |
|---|---|---|---|---|---|---|---|---|
| Superliga | 30 | 26 | 2 | 2 | 67 | 12 | +55 | 86.67 |
| Serbian Cup | 5 | 3 | 0 | 2 | 8 | 5 | +3 | 60.00 |
| UEFA Europa League | 6 | 2 | 2 | 2 | 9 | 6 | +3 | 33.33 |
| Total | 41 | 31 | 4 | 6 | 84 | 23 | +61 | 75.61 |

| | Competition | Position |
|---|---|---|
| (Serbia) | Serbian SuperLiga | Winners |
| (Serbia) | Serbian Cup | Semi final |
| (European Union) | UEFA Europa League | Play-off round |

=== Serbian SuperLiga ===
==== League table ====
| Pos | Team | Pld | W | D | L | GF | GA | GD | Pts | Qualification or relegation |
|---|---|---|---|---|---|---|---|---|---|---|
| 1 | Partizan (C) | 30 | 26 | 2 | 2 | 67 | 12 | +55 | 80 | Qualification for Champions League second qualifying round |
| 2 | Red Star Belgrade | 30 | 21 | 5 | 4 | 57 | 18 | +39 | 68 | Qualification for Europa League second qualifying round (Note: Red Star as 2011–12 Serbian Cup winners qualified for the second qualifying round of the UEFA Europa League. Since they finished second in the league, the third-placed team also qualified for the Europa League second qualifying round, and the fourth-placed team qualified for the Europa League first qualifying round.) |
| 3 | Vojvodina | 30 | 14 | 10 | 6 | 44 | 26 | +18 | 52 | Qualification for Europa League second qualifying round |
| 4 | Jagodina | 30 | 14 | 9 | 7 | 34 | 20 | +14 | 51 (Note: Head-to-head points: Jagodina: 4 pts, Sloboda Užice: 1 pts.) | Qualification for Europa League first qualifying round |
| 5 | Sloboda Užice | 30 | 15 | 6 | 9 | 42 | 35 | +7 | 51 | |

Source: SuperLiga
Rules for classification: 1) points; 2) head-to-head points; 3) head-to-head goal difference; 4) head-to-head goals scored; 5) goal difference; 6) number of goals scored.
(C) Champions

==== Matches ====
| Date | Round | Opponents | Ground | Result | Scorers |
|---|---|---|---|---|---|
| 13 August 2011 | 1 | Novi Pazar | H | 5 – 0 | Eduardo 15', Tomić 45', Ilić 53', L. Marković 83', Babović 86' |
| 21 August 2011 | 2 | Sloboda | A | 1 – 2 | Aksentijević 30' |
| 28 August 2011 | 3 | OFK Beograd | H | 3 – 0 | L. Marković 59', Diarra 83', 90+3' |
| 10 September 2011 | 4 | Jagodina | A | 1 – 0 | Tomić 79' (pen.) |
| 17 September 2011 | 5 | Hajduk | H | 2 – 0 | Tomić 10', 48' |
| 24 September 2011 | 6 | Rad | H | 1 – 0 | Eduardo 26' |
| 1 October 2011 | 7 | Vojvodina | A | 2 – 1 | L. Marković 2', Šćepović 20' |
| 15 October 2011 | 8 | Spartak | H | 2 – 0 | Vukić 29' (pen.), 41' |
| 22 October 2011 | 9 | Javor | A | 2 – 0 | L. Marković 45', Vukić 62' |
| 29 October 2011 | 10 | Smederevo | H | 3 – 1 | Vukić 32', Šćepović 39', L. Marković 79' |
| 5 November 2011 | 11 | BSK | A | 1 – 0 | Šćepović 27' |
| 19 November 2011 | 12 | Borac | H | 5 – 1 | Tomić 17', 77', L. Marković 33', Vukić 65', Mladenović 85' (o.g.) |
| 26 November 2011 | 13 | Crvena zvezda | A | 2 – 0 | Vukić 71', Šćepović 78' |
| 3 December 2011 | 14 | Radnički | H | 3 – 0 | Vukić 27', Anderson Marques 48', Ivanov 62' |
| 10 December 2011 | 15 | Metalac | A | 3 – 0 | Eduardo 10', Babović 42', Vukić 52' |
| 2 March 2012 | 16 | Novi Pazar | A | 1 – 1 | Diarra 48', |
| 10 March 2012 | 17 | Sloboda | H | 0 – 0 | – |
| 14 March 2012 | 18 | OFK Beograd | A | 2 - 1 | Tomić 28', Ivanov 44' |
| 17 March 2012 | 19 | Jagodina | H | 4 - 0 | Ilić 1' 54', Diarra 10' 44' |
| 25 March 2012 | 20 | Hajduk | A | 2 - 0 | Tomić 33' (pen.),90' |
| 31 March 2012 | 21 | Rad | A | 4 - 1 | Ivanov 6' Diarra 14' 43' Babović 33' |
| 4 April 2012 | 22 | Vojvodina | H | 4 - 1 | Tomić 57' Vukić 66' 90' Volkov 87' |
| 7 April 2012 | 23 | Spartak | H | 2 - 1 | Eduardo 48' Vukić 62' |
| 14 April 2012 | 24 | Javor | H | 2 - 1 | Vukić 7' Tomić 72' |
| 21 April 2012 | 25 | Smederevo | A | 2 - 0 | Ilic 86' Manga 90' |
| 25 April 2012 | 26 | BSK | H | 2 – 0 | Diarra 12' Vukić 52' |
| 29 April 2012 | 27 | Borac | A | 4 – 0 | S.Marković 11' Ivanov 63' Diarra 80', 83' |
| 5 May 2012 | 28 | Crvena zvezda | H | 1 – 0 | |
| 12 May 2012 | 29 | Radnički | A | 1 – 0 | Babović 20' |
| 20 May 2012 | 30 | Metalac | H | 1 – 0 | Diarra 45' |

=== Serbian Cup ===
| Date | Round | Opponents | Ground | Result | Scorers |
|---|---|---|---|---|---|
| 21 September 2011 | 1/16 | Novi Pazar | A | 3 – 0 | Tomić 28', Ilić 55', Vukić 82' |
| 26 October 2011 | 1/8 | Metalac | H | 3 – 1 | Vukić 7', 10', Babović 90+4' |
| 23 November 2011 | 1/4 | OFK Beograd | A | 2 – 0 | Diarra 6', L. Marković 55' |
| 21 March 2012 | 1/2 | Crvena zvezda | A | 2 – 0 | – |
| 11 April 2012 | 1/2 | Crvena zvezda | H | 2 – 0 | – |

=== UEFA Champions League ===
==== Qualifying rounds ====
By finishing 1st in the 2010–11 Serbian SuperLiga, Partizan qualified for the Champions League. They will start in the second qualifying round.

| Date | Round | country | Opponents | Ground | Result | Scorers |
|---|---|---|---|---|---|---|
| 13 July 2011 | QR2 | (North Macedonia) | Shkëndija | H | 4 – 0 | Vukić 48', Eduardo 58', Šćepović 74', Berisha 76' (o.g.) |
| 19 July 2011 | QR2 | (North Macedonia) | Shkëndija | A | 1 – 0 | Jovančić 68' |
| 26 July 2011 | QR3 | (Belgium) | Genk | A | 1 – 2 | Tomić 65' |
| 3 August 2011 | QR3 | (Belgium) | Genk | H | 1 – 1 | Tomić 40' |

=== UEFA Europa League ===
==== Play-off round ====
| Date | Round | Opponents | Ground | Result | Scorers |
|---|---|---|---|---|---|
| 18 August 2011 | Play-off round | (Republic of Ireland) Shamrock Rovers | A | 1 – 1 | Tomić 14' |
| 25 August 2011 | Play-off round | (Republic of Ireland) Shamrock Rovers | H | 1 – 2 (a.e.t.) | Volkov 35' |

== Friendlies ==
| Date | Opponents | Result | Scorers |
|---|---|---|---|
| 23 June 2011 | (Slovenia) Olimpija Ljubljana | 2 – 2 | Vukić 30', Šćepović 79' |
| 2 July 2011 | (Slovakia) FC Petržalka | 6 – 0 | Eduardo 22', 37' Moravčík 26'(OG.) Ninković 78′, 90′ Jovančić 88′ |
| 6 July 2011 | (North Macedonia) FK Metalurg Skopje | 3 – 0 | Babović 15' Jovančić 33' Tomić 80' |
| 29 July 2011 | (Norway) Rosenborg BK | 0 – 0 | |
| 3 September 2011 | (Italy) Cagliari Calcio | 1 – 0 | Babović 80' (pen.) |
| 12 November 2011 | (Romania) FC Petrolul Ploiești | 1 – 0 | |
| 31 January 2012 | (Israel) Maccabi Haifa | 3 – 0 | Eduardo 20′Miljković 21′ Ivanov 87′ |
| 15 February 2012 | (Ukraine) Chornomorets Odesa | 2 – 1 | Tomić 73′ Vukić 86′ |
| 18 February 2012 | (Denmark) Horsens | 0 – 0 | |
| 19 February 2012 | (Ukraine) Shakhtar Donetsk | 2 – 1 | Marković 10′ |
| 21 February 2012 | (China) Jiangsu Sainty | 2 – 0 | Babić 17′ Babović 90′ |
| 23 February 2012 | (Russia) Dynamo Moscow | 2 – 2 | Marković 36′ Diarra 62′ |
| 13 May 2012 | (Montenegro) Berane | 1 – 0 | Manga 57′ |

== Sponsors ==
Kit sponsors
- Kit manufacturer: (Germany) Adidas
- General sponsor: None
- Other sponsor: (France) Renault

== See also ==
- List of FK Partizan seasons
