= Anderson Marques =

Brazilian footballer (born 1983)

Personal information
- Full name: Anderson Marques de Oliveira
- Date of birth: 6 February 1983 (age 43)
- Place of birth: Mogi das Cruzes, Brazil
- Height: 1.82 m (6 ft 0 in)
- Position: Centre-back

Team information
- Current team: Red Bull Bragantino (assistant)

Youth career
- Portuguesa
- Grêmio

Senior career*
Years	Team	Apps	(Gls)
2005–2007	Barueri	13	(2)
2008–2009	Noroeste	29	(3)
2009–2011	São Caetano	104	(5)
2011–2012	Partizan	1	(1)
2012–2013	Audax São Paulo	20	(2)
2013	Ceará	16	(2)
2014–2016	Red Bull Brasil	51	(4)
2016–2017	Juventude	21	(1)
2017–2019	Red Bull Brasil	25	(0)
2019	Red Bull Bragantino	5	(0)
Total		285	(20)

Managerial career
- 2020–: Red Bull Bragantino (assistant)
- * Club domestic league appearances and goals

Anderson Marques de Oliveira (born 6 February 1983) is a Brazilian football coach and former player who played as a defender. He is the current assistant coach of Red Bull Bragantino.

== Playing career ==
=== Early years ===
Born in Mogi das Cruzes, Anderson Marques came through the youth system of Portuguesa, while also spending some time at Grêmio. He made his senior debut with Barueri, before moving to Noroeste. In April 2009, Anderson Marques signed with São Caetano. He spent the following two years with the Azulão, having played over 100 competitive matches.

=== Partizan ===
In July 2011, Anderson Marques signed a three-year contract with Partizan, being given the number 44 shirt. He also rejoined his São Caetano teammate Eduardo Pacheco, who moved in the same direction during the previous month. However, only a few days later, Anderson Marques suffered an injury in training, causing him to miss the start of the season. He was eventually out of the first team upon recovery, since Nemanja Rnić and Ivan Ivanov formed the regular central defensive pairing under manager Aleksandar Stanojević.

Anderson Marques finally made his competitive debut for Partizan on 26 October 2011, playing the full 90 minutes in a 3–1 Serbian Cup win over Metalac Gornji Milanovac. He made his league debut for the club in a 3–0 home victory over Radnički Kragujevac on 3 December 2011, scoring a goal with a header after a corner kick. However, Anderson Marques failed to make any official appearance under new manager Avram Grant in the second part of the 2011–12 campaign, as the club won the league title.

=== Return to Brazil ===
After being released by Partizan, Anderson Marques returned to Brazil and signed with Audax São Paulo in August 2012. He moved to Ceará in May 2013, scoring twice from 16 appearances in the Campeonato Brasileiro Série B until the end of the year, as the club finished one point short of promotion to Série A. Subsequently, Anderson Marques joined Red Bull Brasil. He spent two years at the club, making his Campeonato Brasileiro Série D debut in 2015. In May 2016, Anderson Marques switched to Série C side Juventude. He helped them win promotion to Série B. In March 2017, Anderson Marques returned to his former club Red Bull Brasil. He became part of the Red Bull Bragantino squad when Red Bull Brasil merged with Clube Atlético Bragantino in April 2019.

== Career statistics ==
As of 16 April 2022

Club	Season	League		State League		Cup		State Cup		Continental		Total	
Club	Season	Apps	Goals	Apps	Goals	Apps	Goals	Apps	Goals	Apps	Goals	Apps	Goals
Barueri	2005	—		(Note: Appearances in Campeonato Paulista Série A3)						—			
Barueri	2006	—		(Note: Appearances in Campeonato Paulista Série A2)						—			
Barueri	2007	—		13 (Note: Appearances in Campeonato Paulista)	2	0	0			—		13	2
Barueri	Total			13	2	0	0			—		13	2
Noroeste	2008			14	2	0	0			—		14	2
Noroeste	2009	—		15	1	0	0			—		15	1
Noroeste	Total			29	3	0	0			—		29	3
São Caetano	2009	23	2	0	0	0	0	0	0	—		23	2
São Caetano	2010	34	3	20	0	0	0	0	0	—		54	3
São Caetano	2011	8	0	19	0	0	0	0	0	—		27	0
São Caetano	Total	65	5	39	0	0	0	0	0	—		104	5
Partizan	2011–12	1	1	—		1	0	—		0	0	2	1
Audax São Paulo	2012	—		0	0	0	0	11 (Note: Appearances in Copa Paulista)	1	—		11	1
Audax São Paulo	2013	—		20	2	0	0	0	0	—		20	2
Audax São Paulo	Total	—		20	2	0	0	11	1	—		31	3
Ceará	2013	16	2	0	0	0	0	0	0	—		16	2
Red Bull Brasil	2014	—		17	3	0	0	15	1	—		32	4
Red Bull Brasil	2015	8	1	13	0	0	0	0	0	—		21	1
Red Bull Brasil	2016	—		13	0	2	0	0	0	—		15	0
Red Bull Brasil	Total	8	1	43	3	2	0	15	1	—		68	5
Juventude	2016	17	1	0	0	0	0	0	0	—		17	1
Juventude	2017	0	0	4 (Note: Appearances in Campeonato Gaúcho)	0	1	0	0	0	—		5	0
Juventude	Total	17	1	4	0	1	0	0	0	—		22	1
Red Bull Brasil	2017	6	0	6	0	0	0	0	0	—		12	0
Red Bull Brasil	2018	—		10	0	0	0	17	2	—		27	2
Red Bull Brasil	2019	—		3	0	0	0	0	0	—		3	0
Red Bull Brasil	Total	6	0	19	0	0	0	17	2	—		42	2
Red Bull Bragantino	2019	5	0	—		—		—		—		5	0
Career total		118	10	167	10	4	0	43	4	0	0	332	24

== Honours ==
Barueri

- Campeonato Paulista Série A2: 2006
- Campeonato Paulista Série A3: 2005

Partizan

- Serbian SuperLiga: 2011–12

Red Bull Bragantino

- Campeonato Brasileiro Série B: 2019
