= Lazar Marković =

Serbian footballer (born 1994)

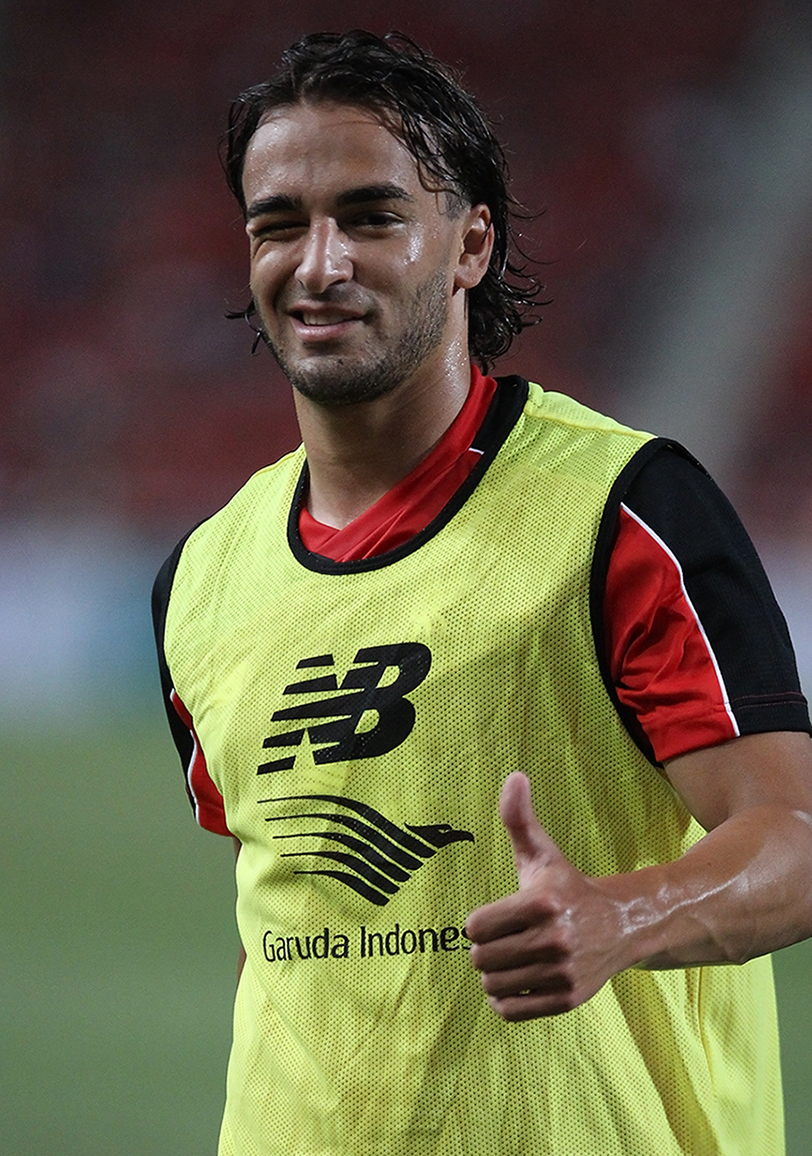
- Marković training with Liverpool in 2015

Personal information
- Full name: Lazar Marković
- Date of birth: 2 March 1994 (age 32)
- Place of birth: Čačak, Serbia, FR Yugoslavia
- Height: 1.75 m (5 ft 9 in)
- Position: Winger

Team information
- Current team: Čukarički
- Number: 8

Youth career
- Borac Čačak
- 2006–2011: Partizan

Senior career*
Years	Team	Apps	(Gls)
2011–2013	Partizan	46	(13)
2013–2014	Benfica	26	(5)
2014–2019	Liverpool	19	(2)
2015–2016	→ Fenerbahçe (loan)	14	(0)
2016–2017	→ Sporting CP (loan)	6	(1)
2017	→ Hull City (loan)	12	(2)
2018	→ Anderlecht (loan)	8	(1)
2019	Fulham	1	(0)
2019–2022	Partizan	58	(17)
2022–2024	Gaziantep	49	(7)
2023	→ Trabzonspor (loan)	8	(1)
2024–2025	Baniyas	25	(4)
2025–2026	Apollon Limassol	18	(1)
2026–	Čukarički	2	(0)

International career^{‡}
2009–2011	Serbia U17	8	(0)
2011–2016	Serbia U21	2	(0)
2012–2016	Serbia	22	(3)
- * Club domestic league appearances and goals as of 9:32, 17 October 2026 (UTC) ‡ National team caps and goals as of 15 November 2016

Lazar Marković (Serbian Cyrillic: Лазар Марковић, pronounced [lâzaːr mǎːrkoʋitɕ]; born 2 March 1994) is a Serbian professional footballer who plays as a winger for Serbian SuperLiga club Čukarički.

He started his career at Partizan before moving to Benfica in 2013, where he won a domestic treble in his only season, after which he completed a £20 million move to Liverpool. He spent most of his time out on loan, at Fenerbahçe, Sporting CP, Hull City and Anderlecht.

Marković made his full international debut for Serbia in 2012, going on to earn 22 caps for the national team.

== Club career ==
=== Partizan ===
After playing for the youth selections of Borac Čačak, Marković joined Partizan in 2006 as a 12-year-old trainee. On 29 May 2011, coach Aleksandar Stanojević promoted Marković to the first team ahead of the final round of the 2010–11 SuperLiga, which Partizan played against Sloboda Užice. He was given the number 50 shirt. Marković was used as a second-half substitute for Joseph Kizito in his team's 2–1 win.

==== 2011–12 season ====
On 11 July 2011, together with Nikola Ninković, Marković signed his first professional contract with Partizan, for five years. Marković made his first appearance of the 2011–12 season in Partizan's opener against Shkëndija, in the qualifying round of the UEFA Champions League, playing the last three minutes of the match. He scored his first senior goal in a league match against Novi Pazar, on 13 August 2011. At the end of 2011, Marković was voted Partizan's Player of the Year in a poll on the club's website. In his first full senior season, Marković made 26 league appearances and scored six goals. Despite not scoring a goal in the second half of the championship, Marković earned 2011–12 SuperLiga Team of the Year selection.

==== 2012–13 season ====
As Partizan appeared in the group stage of an UEFA competition for the first time since 2010, Marković appeared in all group fixtures, impressing against the likes of Neftchi Baku, Rubin Kazan and Internazionale. In the group stage, he assisted Saša Marković against Rubin Kazan on 6 December 2012. By the end of the 2012–13 season, Marković appeared in 19 league games and scored 7 goals and earned a place in the SuperLiga's Team of the Year selection for the second-straight season. Additionally, Serbian sports portal Mozzart Sport rated Marković among the 25 best players in the SuperLiga that season.

=== Benfica ===
On the morning hours of 10 June 2013, Partizan club president Dragan Đurić told Sportski žurnal, "Chelsea wants to loan Marković to Benfica for two years, and honestly speaking, I hope to God that they don't come to an agreement so that Lazar can stay six more months at Partizan." This statement was later misinterpreted by several non-Serbian sports news outlets, which incorrectly cited Đurić stating, "It is true, Chelsea will send Marković on a loan for two years." Approximately eight hours after the article was published, Benfica's official website released a statement stating Marković had signed a five-year contract with the club, not mentioning any loan deal with Chelsea. The earlier statements regarding a potential loan deal with Chelsea caused great confusion among journalists and followers of the transfer saga alike.

On 25 August 2013, Marković made his debut for Benfica in 2–1 win against Gil Vicente, scoring a decisive goal at the 92nd minute that drew the game. On the third matchday of the 2013–14 Primeira Liga season, against Sporting CP at the Estádio José Alvalade, Marković scored the equalizing goal after a dribble past three players, as the match ended in a 1–1 draw. On 1 May 2014, in injury time of Benfica's 2013–14 UEFA Europa League semi-final second leg match against Juventus, Marković was sent off for a fight with his opponent Mirko Vučinić. Neither were on the field of play at the time, Marković having been substituted and Vučinić still on the substitutes' bench. Marković therefore missed the final through suspension; Benfica lost the final to Sevilla on penalties (4–2) after a 0–0 draw.

=== Liverpool ===
==== 2014–15 season ====
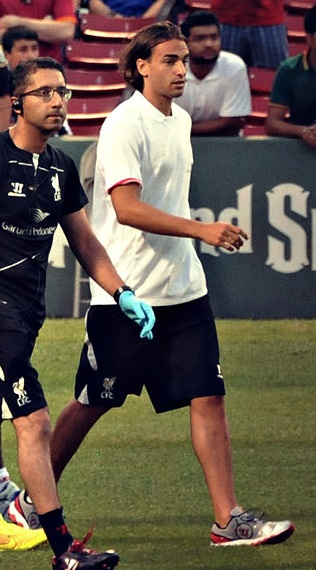
Marković with Liverpool in 2014

On 15 July 2014, Liverpool announced the signing of Marković from Benfica for £20 million. Benfica received €12.5 million for their 50% share of his economic rights. He made his competitive debut on 25 August in Liverpool's second match of the 2014–15 Premier League season, replacing Philippe Coutinho after 60 minutes of a 3–1 defeat at Manchester City. In Liverpool's final group stage match in the UEFA Champions League, on 9 December 2014 against Basel, Marković was shown a straight red card for violent conduct after he appeared to flick his fingers into the face of opponent Behrang Safari. The match ended in a 1–1 draw, which saw Liverpool drop into the UEFA Europa League. In February 2015, Marković was given a four-match European ban for this incident.

Marković scored his first goal for Liverpool against AFC Bournemouth in the League Cup quarter-finals on 17 December 2014, scoring in the 27th minute of a 3–1 victory. On 10 January 2015, he scored his first Premier League goal, netting in the eight minute for the only goal in a victory at Sunderland's Stadium of Light. On 10 February, he opened the scoring for Liverpool in a 3–2 win over Tottenham Hotspur, his first Premier League goal at Anfield.

==== 2015–16: Loan to Fenerbahçe ====
On 30 August 2015, Marković joined Fenerbahçe on a season-long loan. He made his Süper Lig debut on 13 September, replacing Robin van Persie in the 62nd minute of a 1–0 win at Kasımpaşa, and scored his first goal on 10 December by opening a 1–1 draw against Celtic at the Şükrü Saracoğlu Stadium. The result advanced the Yellow Canaries to the last 32 of the 2015–16 UEFA Europa League.

On 21 January 2016, Marković scored his first goal in domestic Turkish football against Tuzlaspor in the group stage of the 2015–16 Turkish Cup, converting in extra time after coming on as a substitute. His season ended prematurely in February because of a hamstring injury.

==== 2016–17: Loans to Sporting and Hull ====
On 31 August 2016, Marković returned to Lisbon to join Benfica's local rivals Sporting CP on a season-long loan. He made his debut on 10 September, replacing Gelson Martins for the final 30 minutes of a 3–0 home win over Moreirense, and scored his first goal three weeks later on his first start to open a 3–3 draw at Vitória de Guimarães.

In January 2017, Marković was recalled from his loan in Portugal and joined Premier League club Hull City for the remainder of the season. He made his first Hull appearance as a 59th-minute substitute for Jarrod Bowen in a 2–1 win over Manchester United in the 2016–17 EFL Cup semi-final second leg, as the Tigers lost 3–2 on aggregate. He scored his first goal for Hull by equalising in a 4–2 win at the KCOM Stadium against Middlesbrough on 5 April.

==== 2017–18: Loan to Anderlecht ====
In January 2018, Marković again moved out on loan joining Belgian First Division A side RSC Anderlecht for the second half of the 2017–18 season. It was admitted that upon Marković's arrival his fitness and condition was so poor that he would miss up to six weeks of game time in order to get up to standard. He played eight times for the club from Brussels and scored once, in a 2–1 loss at KRC Genk on 21 April, after which he attacked Liverpool for their treatment of him.

=== Fulham ===
On 31 January 2019, Marković moved to Fulham on a free transfer for the rest of the season, having been recommended to the club by international teammate Aleksandar Mitrović. He made his sole appearance for the team on 22 February as a half-time substitute for Jean Michaël Seri in a 3–1 loss at West Ham United. He did not make a further appearance following Claudio Ranieri's sacking, and after end the contract on 30 June 2019, he was released from the club.

=== Return to Partizan ===
On 3 September 2019, Marković signed a three-year contract with Partizan. On 15 September 2019, Marković scored his first goal of the second spell with Partizan in a 0–3 league win against Proleter Novi Sad.

=== Gaziantep ===
In July 2022, Marković returned to Turkey on a permanent basis to join Gaziantep on a two-year deal with the option for a further year.

In February 2023, with Gaziantep having withdrawn from the 2022–23 season on account of the impact from the 2023 Turkey-Syria earthquake, Marković joined Trabzonspor on loan until the end of the season.

=== FC Baniyas ===
On 20 July 2024, Marković joined UAE Pro League side FC Baniyas where he scored 4 goals in 25 appearances for the club. He scored his first goal on 31 January 2025, in a 1–0 league win over Al-Jazira Club.

=== Apollon Limassol ===
On 25 August 2025, Marković signed a one-year contract with Cypriot First Division club Apollon Limassol. He made his official debut for the club on 13 September 2025 in a 1–0 league win against Pafos FC.

== International career ==
Marković skipped the national under-19 national team and was immediately invited to the Serbia under-21 team for their qualification matches for the 2013 UEFA European Under-21 Championship.

On 24 February 2012, Marković was called up to the Serbian senior team for their friendly fixtures against Armenia and Cyprus. He debuted as a starter against Armenia on 28 February 2012, three days before his 18th birthday. He scored his first international goal for Serbia in a friendly match against Chile. Marković was omitted from Serbia's 23-man squad for the 2018 FIFA World Cup in Russia.

== Personal life ==
Marković's older brother, Filip, is also a footballer. An attacking midfielder, he came through Partizan's youth team too.

== Career statistics ==
=== Club ===
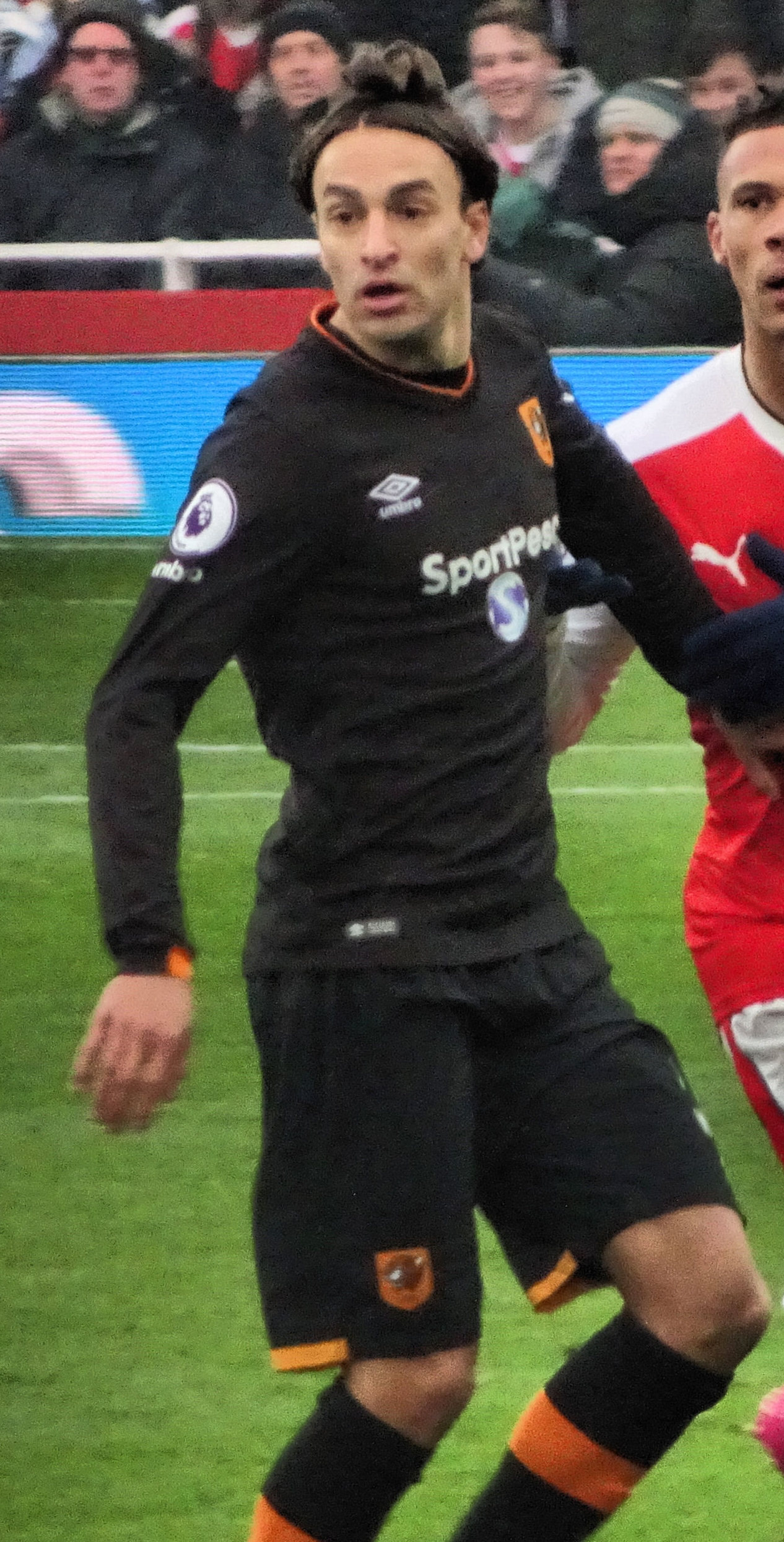
Marković playing for Hull City in 2017

As of 20 July 2024

Appearances and goals by club, season and competition
Club	Season	League			National cup		League cup		Continental		Total	
Club	Season	Division	Apps	Goals	Apps	Goals	Apps	Goals	Apps	Goals	Apps	Goals
Partizan	2010–11	Serbian SuperLiga	1	0	0	0	—		0	0	1	0
Partizan	2011–12	Serbian SuperLiga	26	6	3	1	—		4	0	33	7
Partizan	2012–13	Serbian SuperLiga	19	7	0	0	—		12	0	31	7
Partizan	Total		46	13	3	1	—		16	0	65	14
Benfica	2013–14	Primeira Liga	26	5	6	1	4	0	13	1	49	7
Liverpool	2014–15	Premier League	19	2	6	0	5	1	4	0	34	3
Liverpool	2018–19	Premier League	0	0	0	0	0	0	0	0	0	0
Liverpool	Total		19	2	6	0	2	1	4	0	34	3
Fenerbahçe (loan)	2015–16	Süper Lig	14	0	4	1	—		2	1	20	2
Sporting CP (loan)	2016–17	Primeira Liga	6	1	2	1	1	0	5	0	14	2
Hull City (loan)	2016–17	Premier League	12	2	1	0	1	0	—		14	2
Anderlecht (loan)	2017–18	Belgian First Division A	8	1	0	0	—		0	0	8	1
Fulham	2018–19	Premier League	1	0	0	0	0	0	0	0	1	0
Partizan	2019–20	Serbian SuperLiga	10	5	5	0	—		2	0	17	5
Partizan	2020–21	Serbian SuperLiga	27	12	4	0	—		2	0	33	12
Partizan	2021–22	Serbian SuperLiga	21	0	4	1	—		14	3	39	4
Partizan	Total		58	17	13	1	—		18	3	89	21
Gaziantep	2022–23	Süper Lig	19	4	3	1	—		—		22	5
Gaziantep	2023–24	Süper Lig	30	3	4	1	—		—		34	4
Gaziantep	Total		49	7	7	2	—		0	0	56	9
Trabzonspor (loan)	2022–23	Süper Lig	8	1	1	0	—		—		9	1
Career total			247	48	43	7	11	1	58	5	360	61

=== International ===
As of match played 15 November 2016

Appearances and goals by national team and year
National team	Year	Apps	Goals
Serbia	2012	6	1
Serbia	2013	3	1
Serbia	2014	8	0
Serbia	2015	4	1
Serbia	2016	1	0
Total		22	3

Scores and results list Serbia's goal tally first, score column indicates score after each Marković goal.

List of international goals scored by Lazar Marković
No.	Date	Venue	Cap	Opponent	Score	Result	Competition
1	14 November 2012	AFG Arena, St. Gallen, Switzerland	6	Chile	1–0	3–1	Friendly
2	10 September 2013	Cardiff City Stadium, Cardiff, Wales	9	Wales	3–0	3–0	2014 World Cup qualification
3	7 June 2015	NV Arena, Sankt Pölten, Austria	19	Azerbaijan	4–1	4–1	Friendly

== Honours ==
Partizan

- SuperLiga: 2011–12, 2012–13

Benfica

- Primeira Liga: 2013–14
- Taça de Portugal: 2013–14
- Taça da Liga: 2013–14

Individual

- SuperLiga Team of the Year: 2011–12, 2012–13
- SJPF Player of the Month: January 2014, February 2014
- UEFA Europa League Squad of the season: 2013–14
- FK Partizan Player of the Year: 2011
