= ŽFK Fruškogorac =

ZFK Fruškogorac
- Full name: ZFK Fruškogorac
- Founded: 1998
- Ground: FK Mladost, Novi Sad
- Capacity: 5.000
- Chairman: (Serbia) Dragan Đurić
- Manager: (Serbia) Dragan Đuric
- League: Druga Liga Srbije Sever
- 2009-2010: 2nd
Home colours	Away colours

ZFK Fruškogorac (Serbian Cyrillic: ЖФК Фpушкoгopaц) is a women's football club based in Novi Sad, Serbia. They currently play in the northern section of the second division in Serbia, the Druga Liga Srbije Sever.

== Squad as of 2010 ==
- Isidora Sekulic
- Arijana Đurić
- Tanja Miladinov
- Julijana Tatic
- Tamara Popovic
- Jelena Gvozdenac
- Aleksandra Draganović
- Jovana Orlandić
- Aleksandra Marinković
- Dajana Đurić
- Miroslava Radosavljev
- Amanda Madači
- Rada Tomašević
- Olivera Milošević
- Tanja Blagojević
- Ljubica Rušiti
- Milana Golubović
- Milica Nenadov
- Tamara Papić
- Jelena Rajčetić
- Zorana Martinović
- Aleksandra Prnjavorac
- Tijana Pejović
