= Nikola Ninković =

Serbian footballer

Personal information
- Date of birth: 19 December 1994 (age 31)
- Place of birth: Bogatić, FR Yugoslavia
- Height: 1.82 m (6 ft 0 in)
- Position: Attacking midfielder

Team information
- Current team: NorthEast United
- Number: 10

Youth career
- Partizan

Senior career*
Years	Team	Apps	(Gls)
2011–2016	Partizan	81	(13)
2016–2018	Genoa	17	(2)
2016	→ Chievo (loan)	1	(0)
2017–2018	→ Empoli (loan)	20	(4)
2018–2021	Ascoli	62	(15)
2021	Brescia	0	(0)
2021–2022	Proleter Novi Sad	18	(2)
2022–2023	Borac Banja Luka	20	(3)
2023–2024	Torpedo Kutaisi	37	(10)
2025	Tekstilac Odžaci	9	(1)
2025–2026	Sumgayit	31	(2)
2026–	NorthEast United	4	(0)

International career
2011	Serbia U17 (Note: Only official UEFA matches included)	2	(0)
2012	Serbia U19	5	(3)
2012–2016	Serbia U21	4	(1)
- * Club domestic league appearances and goals as of 5 November 2026

Nikola Ninković (Serbian Cyrillic: Никола Нинковић; born 19 December 1994) is a Serbian professional footballer who plays as an attacking midfielder for Indian Super League club NorthEast United.

== Club career ==
=== Partizan ===
On 11 July 2011, alongside Lazar Marković, Ninković signed his first professional contract with Partizan, on a five-year deal. He made his competitive debut for the club in the return leg of the UEFA Champions League second qualifying round, coming on as a substitute for Zvonimir Vukić in a 1–0 away win over Shkëndija on 19 July 2011. After missing the vast majority of the 2011–12 season due to mononucleosis, Ninković made his league debut in a 4–1 away victory against Rad on 31 March 2012. He recorded three more appearances until the end of the season, as the club won the league title.

On 11 August 2012, Ninković scored his first competitive goal for Partizan in a 7–0 home league victory over BSK Borča. He became the club's youngest captain ever on 31 October 2012 at 17 years, 10 months and 12 days, coming on as a substitute in a 1–2 Serbian Cup loss to Borac Čačak, thus surpassing Stevan Jovetić. The record was later broken by Andrija Živković.

On 30 October 2013, Ninković scored a brace in a 3–0 Serbian Cup win away at Radnički Niš. He also scored an 86th-minute winning goal in a 2–1 home league victory over the same opponent on 1 March 2014, before being sent off in the 88th minute of the game.

On 22 July 2014, Ninković scored his first goal for Partizan in UEFA competitions, scoring an equalizer in a 3–1 away win against HB Tórshavn. He made a total of 38 appearances and scored six goals in all competitions during the 2014–15 campaign.

=== Genoa ===
On 1 February 2016, Ninković was transferred to Italian club Genoa, being immediately loaned to fellow Serie A side Chievo until the end of the 2015–16 season. He subsequently returned to Genoa for the 2016–17 season, making 19 appearances and scoring three goals in the process. Under coach Ivan Jurić, he was deployed as a play-making left back in a 3-4-2-1 formation.

=== Ascoli ===
On 18 August 2018, Ninković signed a three-season contract with Serie B team Ascoli.

==== Brescia ====
On 1 February 2021, Ninković signed with Serie B club Brescia.

== International career ==
Ninković represented Serbia at the 2011 UEFA Under-17 Championship that was hosted by his country. He was also a member of the team at the 2012 UEFA Under-19 Championship that took place in Estonia. In the second game of the group stage, Ninković scored directly from a corner kick in a 1–2 loss to England on 6 July 2012.

On 7 September 2012, Ninković scored the equalizing goal on his under-21 debut in a 1–1 away draw with Denmark. He also appeared in a 0–1 home loss to England in the UEFA Under-21 Championship 2013 qualification play-offs. On 25 October 2012, alongside Ognjen Mudrinski, Ninković received a one-year ban from the Football Association of Serbia following incidents after the game with England.

In late 2016, ahead of the UEFA Under-21 Championship 2017 qualification play-offs, Ninković was called up to the under-21 team for the first time after the Kruševac incident.

== Career statistics ==
As of 2 June 2026

Appearances and goals by club, season and competition
Club	Season	League		Cup		Continental		Other		Total	
Club	Season	Apps	Goals	Apps	Goals	Apps	Goals	Apps	Goals	Apps	Goals
Partizan	2011–12	4	0	1	0	2	0	—		7	0
Partizan	2012–13	21	4	1	0	5	0	—		27	4
Partizan	2013–14	19	2	2	2	5	0	—		26	4
Partizan	2014–15	23	4	5	1	10	1	—		38	6
Partizan	2015–16	14	3	1	0	8	0	—		23	3
Partizan	Total	81	13	10	3	30	1	—		121	17
Chievo (loan)	2015–16	1	0	0	0	—		—		1	0
Genoa	2016–17	17	2	2	1	—		—		19	3
Genoa	2017–18	0	0	1	0	—		—		1	0
Genoa	Total	17	2	3	1	0	0	—		20	3
Empoli (loan)	2017–18	20	4	0	0	—		—		20	4
Ascoli	2018–19	31	6	0	0	—		—		31	6
Ascoli	2019–20	31	9	3	0	—		—		34	9
Ascoli	Total	62	15	3	0	—		—		65	15
Proleter Novi Sad	2021–22	18	2	—		—		—		18	2
Borac Banja Luka	2022–23	20	3	2	0	—		—		22	3
Torpedo Kutaisi	2023	13	5	2	0	—		—		15	5
Torpedo Kutaisi	2024	24	5	0	0	—		2	1	26	6
Torpedo Kutaisi	2025	0	0	—		3	0	—		3	0
Torpedo Kutaisi	Total	37	10	2	0	3	0	2	1	44	11
Tekstilac Odžaci	2024–25	9	1	—		—		—		9	1
Sumgayit	2025–26	31	2	4	0	—		—		35	2
Career total		296	52	24	4	33	1	2	1	355	58

== Honours ==
Partizan

- Serbian SuperLiga: 2011–12, 2012–13, 2014–15

Empoli

- Serie B: 2017–18

Torpedo Kutaisi

- Georgian Super Cup: 2024
