= Tomislav Pajović =

Serbian footballer

Personal information
- Date of birth: 15 March 1986 (age 40)
- Place of birth: Titovo Užice, SFR Yugoslavia
- Height: 1.89 m (6 ft 2 in)
- Position: Centre back

Team information
- Current team: Rad

Youth career
- Budućnost Arilje
- 2000–2003: Partizan

Senior career*
Years	Team	Apps	(Gls)
2003–2008	Partizan	0	(0)
2003–2006	→ Teleoptik (loan)	57	(3)
2006–2007	→ Dinamo Vranje (loan)	37	(3)
2007–2008	→ Bežanija (loan)	20	(1)
2008–2009	Čukarički	14	(1)
2009–2012	Rad	62	(4)
2012–2014	Sheriff Tiraspol	5	(0)
2013	→ Partizan (loan)	12	(0)
2013–2014	→ Hapoel Be'er Sheva (loan)	26	(2)
2014–2015	Hapoel Be'er Sheva	27	(0)
2015	Vasas	17	(0)
2016	Budućnost Podgorica	10	(1)
2016	Maccabi Sha'arayim	8	(0)
2017	Rad	12	(0)
2017	Zemun	12	(0)
2018	Navbahor Namangan	17	(1)
2019	Radnik Surdulica	12	(1)
2019–2020	Napredak Kruševac	16	(0)
2020	Kolubara	2	(0)
2021	Budućnost Dobanovci	26	(3)
2025–	Rad	16	(0)

International career
2002–2003	Serbia and Montenegro U17 (Note: Only official UEFA matches included)	7	(0)
2003–2005	Serbia and Montenegro U19	12	(0)
2008	Serbia U21	1	(0)
- * Club domestic league appearances and goals as of 15 July 2026

Tomislav Pajović (Serbian Cyrillic: Томислав Пајовић; born 15 March 1986) is a Serbian professional footballer who plays as a defender for Rad.

== Club career ==
Pajović came through the youth system of Partizan, before going on loan to several clubs, including Dinamo Vranje and Bežanija. He subsequently played for two more Belgrade-based clubs, Čukarički and Rad, before moving abroad and signing for Moldovan club Sheriff Tiraspol in the summer of 2012. In February 2013, Pajović returned to his parent club Partizan on loan until the end of the season. He helped them win the league title, recording 12 appearances in the process. After being loaned to Hapoel Be'er Sheva for one season, Pajović signed with the Israeli side on a permanent basis in June 2014.

== International career ==
Pajović represented FR Yugoslavia at the 2002 UEFA European Under-17 Championship. He made one appearance for the Serbia national under-21 team, coming on as a substitute in a friendly against Israel U21 on 19 November 2008.

== Honours ==
Partizan

- Serbian SuperLiga: 2012–13
