= Aleksandar Stanojević =

Serbian footballer and manager (born 1973)

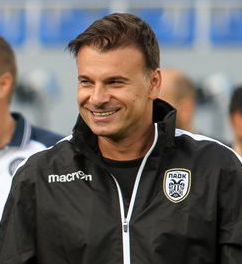
- Stanojević coaching PAOK in 2017

Personal information
- Date of birth: 28 October 1973 (age 53)
- Place of birth: Belgrade, SFR Yugoslavia
- Height: 1.83 m (6 ft 0 in)
- Position: Defender

Youth career
- Hajduk Beograd
- 1986–1992: Partizan

Senior career*
Years	Team	Apps	(Gls)
1992–1995	Obilić		
1995–1996	Mallorca	5	(0)
1996–1997	Obilić	12	(0)
1997–1998	OFK Beograd	40	(2)
1999–2001	Partizan	38	(0)
2001–2002	OFK Beograd	25	(1)
2002–2003	Videoton	14	(0)
Total		134	(3)

International career
1990–1991	Yugoslavia U18	4	(0)

Managerial career
- 2005–2006: OFK Beograd (youth)
- 2006: Srem
- 2007: Partizan (assistant)
- 2007–2008: Serbia (assistant)
- 2008–2010: Serbia U19
- 2010–2012: Partizan
- 2012: Dalian Aerbin
- 2012–2013: Beijing Guoan
- 2014: Maccabi Haifa
- 2015–2016: Beijing BG
- 2017: PAOK
- 2018: Al Qadsiah
- 2018–2019: Beijing Renhe
- 2020–2022: Partizan
- 2023: Konyaspor
- 2024: Partizan
- 2025–2026: Fatih Karagümrük
- 2026–: Partizan
- * Club domestic league appearances and goals

Aleksandar Stanojević (Serbian Cyrillic: Александар Станојевић, pronounced [aleksǎːndar stanǒːjeʋitɕ, alěksaːn-]; born 28 October 1973) is a professional Serbian football manager and former player.

== Playing career ==
Stanojević started his playing career in Partizan youth squad. From 1992 until 1997 he spent four seasons in Obilić and one season in Spanish Segunda División playing for Mallorca. In 1997, he joined OFK Beograd for two seasons. He rejoined Partizan in 1999, and was part of the squad that won 2001 national cup. After returning to OFK Beograd for a season, he moved to Hungarian National Championship club Videoton, where in 2003 he ended his professional career at the age of 29.

== Managerial career ==
=== Early career ===
Stanojević began his coaching career as a youth coach at OFK Beograd. His first job as a head coach was in Serbian First League club Srem. For almost two years he was the assistant coach for Miroslav Đukić in Partizan and later Serbia national team. On 3 September 2008, he was appointed the head coach of Serbia national under-19 team that finished 3rd in 2009 UEFA European Under-19 Championship in Ukraine. Stanojević was named the most prospective Serbian coach by the Football Association of Serbia for the year 2010.

=== Partizan ===
On 15 April 2010, Goran Stevanović resigned from Partizan following a disappointing result in national cup semi-finals. Within 24 hours, Stanojević was promoted as new Partizan head coach, and at the age of just 36 became the youngest manager in the club history. With Stanojević in position, Partizan won all seven remaining league fixtures, including the Eternal derby and defended the title. The team carried good momentum from the league finish into Champions League qualifying phase and managed to go all the way and qualify for the group stage.

Stanojević, who was largely credited for this success, thus became the first Serbian coach to lead one Serbian team into the UEFA Champions League group stage. He managed the team through another successful campaign as Partizan won the 2010–11 double.

In late May 2011, Stanojević signed new 2-year contract with Partizan. However, start of 2011–12 season brought disappointing results in qualifications for UEFA Champions League and UEFA Europa League, when Partizan did not succeed to reach the group stage in either of those competitions. Despite lack of success in international competitions, performance in domestic competition in the first half of the 2011–12 season was successful, as Partizan ended the half-season on the first place with 10 points ahead of its first rival.

During the mid-season break, Partizan director of football Mladen Krstajić attacked club president Dragan Đurić over the media, following Đurić's claim that director of football and coach were solely responsible for unsuccessful campaign in UEFA competitions for the 2011–12 season. Krstajić stated that he and Stanojević did not have full control over the sale and acquisition of players during summer transfer window, which affected the results on the field. Stanojević openly said he would resign as head coach if they were to sack Krstajić. Stanojević and Krstajić gained wide support from Partizan fans, who asked Đurić to step down.

The day before Krstajić was released, Partizan fans Grobari chanted Krstajić's name during a basketball game against arch rivals KK Crvena zvezda as a sign of support. Krstajić advised Stanojević over the media to stay as the head coach of Partizan, adding his opinion that Stanojević was the best football coach in Serbia. Stanojević postponed his decision until 6 January 2012, when he confirmed he decided to continue his work as the head coach of Partizan. Despite this fact, the board of directors of Partizan dismissed Stanojević on 13 January 2012 and appointed Avram Grant as the new coach. Stanojević was not allowed to hold a press conference the next day at the stadium, but given the popularity he has among the fans, they gathered in front of the stadium to show their support to him and protest against the decision of the club.

On 17 January 2012, Stanojević organized a press conference in Belgrade when he spoke in detail about his engagement at Partizan, the way the club was organized and worked during that period and his vision of the club.

=== Dalian Aerbin ===
On 4 April 2012, Stanojević was appointed as the new manager of Chinese Super League side Dalian Aerbin, replacing Chang Woe-ryong who resigned from the club the day before. He led Dalian Aerbin from the bottom of Super League to reach the fifth place at the end of the season. Stanojević officially announced his resignation on 9 November 2012.

=== Beijing Guoan ===
On 15 December 2012, Chinese Super League side Beijing Guoan officially presented Stanojević as their new manager. He led Beijing Guoan to the third place in the Chinese Super League and semi-finals in the FA Cup. Stanojević, also led Beijing Guoan to their first Asian Champions League win over a club from South Korea, a home victory against FC Pohang Steelers in the Asian Champions League and guided the team through the group stage of the Champions League for the second time in the club history. However, his coaching style was questioned by the club and the media of Beijing at the last months of the season, especially after losing to Guangzhou Evergrande in the semi-finals of FA Cup. He was sacked at the end of the season.

=== Maccabi Haifa ===
On 25 April 2014, it was announced that Stanojević was appointed as the new manager of Israeli club Maccabi Haifa. Under Stanojević the team reached semi-final of Toto Cup, after winning first place in group phase of competition. On 15 September 2014 Maccabi Haifa started new season with first game at new Sammy Ofer Stadium in front of more than 27,000 supporters against Bnei Sakhnin F.C. Stanojević led team to a 4–2 victory in this match.

After Maccabi Haifa lost to Beitar Jerusalem with the score 3–1 at home, Stanojević met with club's chairman Ya'akov Shahar, in which they, after Stanojević insist that he want to leave, decided that Stanojević will continue no longer in managing the team. At the moment, Maccabi Haifa was placed fourth in the league, and in the final of the Toto Cup.

=== Beijing BG ===
On 12 January 2015, Stanojević returned to China and signed a three-year contract with China League One side Beijing BG. Under Stanojević, Beijing Enterprises finished in fourth place overall in their debut season in China League One, four points away from promotion to the Chinese Super League. Stanojević saw the team succeed in the Chinese FA Cup, where they reached the semi-final. On the way to semi-final, Beijing Enterprises eliminated three Chinese Super League teams; Shijiazhuang Ever Bright, Beijing Guoan and Guizhou Renhe. The most notable win was against Stanojević's former team, Beijing Guoan. The match was dubbed by various media as "the Capital Derby I", and it was the first competitive match ever played between two Beijing football clubs at professional level. In 2016, Beijing BG ended up 7th in the China League One. On 12 December 2016, the club released a statement that Stanojević would no longer serve as the team manager.

=== PAOK ===
On 16 June 2017, PAOK announced that Stanojević would be the team's new coach. Despite the fact that Stanojević signed a three-year contract, he was relieved of his duties on 11 August 2017, almost two months later, as said from the club mainly due to poor performances and issues of squad management and harmony. In two competitive matches his team played away draw and won home game against Olimpik Donetsk. That was enough to go through UEFA Europa League third qualifying round, as expected.

=== Al Qadsiah ===
On 24 May 2018, Stanojević signed to Saudi Pro League club Al Qadsiah for one season. His contract was terminated in 4 November as the team won only 4 points out of 8 league matches.

=== Beijing Renhe ===
On 18 December 2018, Stanojević returned to Beijing and signed with Beijing Renhe. On 7 July 2019, Stanojević resigned from position of head coach.

=== Return to Partizan ===
On 1 September 2020, Stanojević returned to Partizan, signing a two-year contract as head coach. In his first season after return to Partizan Stanojević lead team to second place in the Serbian SuperLiga, making longest winning streak in the club history of 19 wins in the row. In this season Stanojević lead Partizan to Serbian Cup final where his team was defeated by Red star after penalties. In the first part of season 2021–22 Stanojević saw the team reaching best result in Serbian League in club history making 19 wins and 2 draws without lose, reaching first place in the Serbian SuperLiga, with the most goals scored (57) and the least goals conceded (6). Also, Partizan for the first time plays in Europa Conference League reaching the group stage after wins over FC DAC 1904 Dunajska Streda, PFC Sochi and C.D. Santa Clara. After group stage Partizan reached Europa Conference League knockout round play off. Partizan triumphed in both legs of their Europa Conference League knockout round play-off against AC Sparta Prague, 1–0 in Prague and 2–1 in Belgrade.

=== Konyaspor ===
On 17 January 2023, he signed a 1.5-year contract with Turkish Super League club Konyaspor.

== Managerial statistics ==
As of 22 November 2026

Managerial record by team and tenure
Team	From	To	Record				
Team	From	To	P	W	D	L	Win %
Srem	2006	2006	17	8	3	6	47.06
Serbia U19	September 2008	April 2010	23	15	3	5	65.22
Partizan	April 2010	January 2012	80	60	7	13	75.00
Dalian Aerbin	April 2012	November 2012	29	13	8	8	44.83
Beijing Guoan	November 2012	January 2014	42	18	13	11	42.86
Maccabi Haifa	July 2014	December 2014	23	11	2	10	47.83
Beijing BG	January 2015	December 2016	67	32	13	22	47.76
PAOK	July 2017	August 2017	2	1	1	0	50.00
Al Qadsiah	May 2018	December 2018	9	2	1	6	22.22
Beijing Renhe	December 2018	July 2019	18	4	2	12	22.22
Partizan	September 2020	May 2022	97	74	11	12	76.29
Konyaspor	January 2023	October 2023	27	6	9	12	22.22
Partizan	June 2024	September 2024	13	3	3	7	23.08
Fatih Karagümrük S.K.	1 January 2026	15 October 2026	30	10	8	12	33.33
Partizan	25 October 2026		5	3	0	2	60.00
Total			492	270	84	138	54.88

== Honours ==
=== Player ===
Partizan

- FR Yugoslavia Cup: 2000–01

=== Manager ===
Partizan

- Serbian SuperLiga: 2009–10, 2010–11
- Serbian Cup: 2010–11
