= Vlado Glođović =

Serbian football referee

- Born: 8 November 1976 (age 49); SFR Yugoslavia

Domestic
Years	League	Role

International
Years	League	Role
2010–	FIFA listed	Referee

Vlado Glođović (Serbian Cyrillic: Владо Глођовић; born 8 November 1976) is a Serbian international referee who refereed at 2014 FIFA World Cup qualifiers.
