= Ivan Ivanov (footballer, born 1988) =

Bulgarian footballer

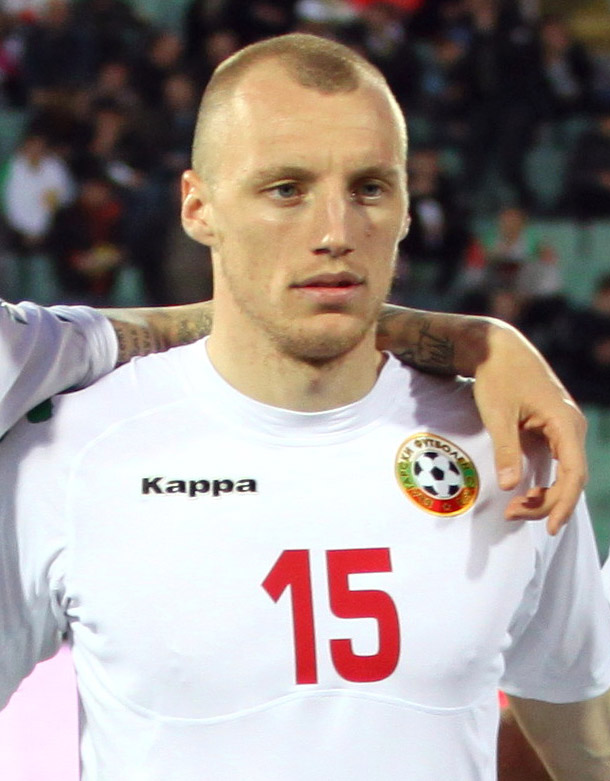
- Ivanov with Bulgaria in 2011

Personal information
- Full name: Ivan Kamenov Ivanov
- Date of birth: 25 February 1988 (age 38)
- Place of birth: Zlatitsa, Bulgaria
- Height: 1.88 m (6 ft 2 in)
- Position: Centre-back

Team information
- Current team: Etar (Manager)

Youth career
- –2005: Pirin 1922

Senior career*
Years	Team	Apps	(Gls)
2004–2005	Pirin 1922	6	(0)
2005–2010	CSKA Sofia	53	(6)
2007–2008	→ Lokomotiv Plovdiv (loan)	24	(0)
2010–2011	Alania Vladikavkaz	24	(2)
2011–2013	Partizan	59	(8)
2013–2015	Basel	11	(0)
2016	Lokomotiv Plovdiv	9	(0)
2016–2017	Panathinaikos	7	(0)
2017	Arsenal Tula	5	(0)
2017–2018	Beroe Stara Zagora	21	(1)
2018–2019	Altay	6	(0)
2019	Vihren Sandanski	3	(0)
2019	Etar	11	(0)

International career
2004–2005	Bulgaria U17	6	(0)
2006–2007	Bulgaria U19	8	(0)
2007–2009	Bulgaria U21	9	(1)
2008–2016	Bulgaria	40	(3)

Managerial career
- 2021–2022: Slavia Sofia U19
- 2022–2023: Slavia Sofia II
- 2022–2023: Bulgaria (assistant)
- 2023: Chavdar Etropole
- 2024: CSKA 1948 II
- 2024–2025: CSKA 1948
- 2025–: Etar
- * Club domestic league appearances and goals

Ivan Kamenov Ivanov (Bulgarian: Иван Каменов Иванов; born 25 February 1988) is a Bulgarian former professional footballer who played as a centre-back and current manager of Etar.

He has been a member of the Bulgarian national team. In 2013, Ivanov was named the Bulgarian Footballer of the Year, becoming the first defender to win this award after Trifon Ivanov in 1996.

== Club career ==
=== Early career ===
Born in Zlatitsa, Ivanov was inspired to become a footballer after watching the Bulgaria national football team's performance during their 1994 FIFA World Cup campaign. He made his debut with Pirin 1922, before moving to CSKA Sofia in 2005. With CSKA, he was a Bulgarian Cup winner in 2006 and Bulgarian Supercup winner in the same year. In August 2007, Ivanov went on loan to Lokomotiv Plovdiv. In the winter of 2008, local media reported that he was a target for English side Derby County, but problems with the work permit stopped the transfer.

=== CSKA Sofia ===
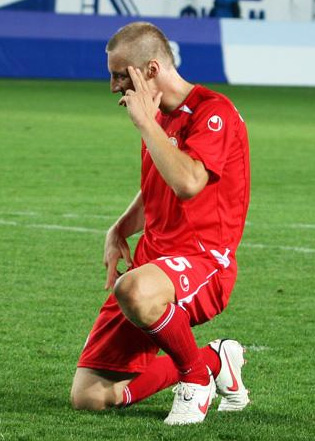
Ivanov celebrating the win against Dynamo Moscow (2009)

After many departures from the club in the 2008 summer transfer window, Ivanov became an integral part of CSKA's defence, together with Kiril Kotev. He was in the starting line-up against Litex Lovech in the 2008 Bulgarian Supercup, which they won 2–1. On 19 September 2008, Ivanov scored his first goal for CSKA against Minyor Pernik, a header after a corner kick in the 67th minute. On 18 March 2009, Ivanov scored against his former club Lokomotiv Plovdiv to secure a 3–1 win for CSKA. He continued his goalscoring run on 21 March 2009, in a 2–0 win against Spartak Varna. In total, Ivanov scored five league goals in the 2008–09 season.

On 15 August 2009, Ivanov scored his first goal of the 2009–10 season, in a 3–0 home win against Beroe Stara Zagora. On 27 August 2009, Ivanov scored the winning goal against Dynamo Moscow in the Europa League play-off round, helping his team to a 2–1 aggregate win and an entry into the group stage of the tournament. On 1 November 2009, he was indefinitely banned from the first team, along with eight other players, following a breach of discipline. On 20 November 2009, Ivanov was reinstated to the first team and a day later came on as a substitute for Aleksandar Branekov in a 2–2 away draw with Lokomotiv Sofia.

=== Alania Vladikavkaz ===
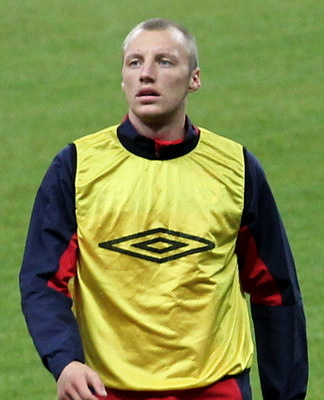
Ivanov in 2010

In February 2010, Ivanov signed a four-year contract with Alania Vladikavkaz. He scored two goals in 24 matches of the Russian Premier League. However, Alania were relegated to the Russian First Division after only one season.

=== Partizan ===
On 17 June 2011, Ivanov signed a three-year contract with Partizan. He made his competitive debut for the club on 13 July 2011, in a 4–0 home win against Shkëndija in the second qualifying round of the Champions League. On 3 December 2011, he scored his first goal for Partizan, in a 3–0 home win against Radnički Kragujevac. He also scored a header which provided to be the winning goal in their 2–1 away win over OFK Beograd on 14 March 2012. In the 2011–12 season, Ivanov played every minute of Partizan's league matches and scored four goals.

On 30 August 2012, Ivanov scored a header against Tromsø to give Partizan a 1–0 win and thus qualify the team for the Europa League group stage. In recognition of his contributions, he was voted Partizan's Player of the Year for 2012 by the club's supporters. Ivanov was also named in the 2012–13 Serbian SuperLiga Team of the Season, alongside four teammates.

=== Basel ===
In August 2013, Ivanov signed a three-year contract, with an option for an additional year, with Swiss side Basel. He joined Basel's first team for their 2013–14 season under head coach Murat Yakin. Ivanov played his domestic league debut for the club in the home game in the St. Jakob-Park on 11 August as Basel were defeated 2–1 by Zürich. He scored his first goal for the club with a header in an away cup match against local amateur club Old Boys, with an assist coming from Matías Delgado. On 11 December 2013, in the Champions League group stage away match Ivanov was shown the red card and dismissed during Basel's 2–0 defeat by Schalke 04.

On 14 January 2014, Ivanov suffered a knee injury in a friendly match against Eintracht Braunschweig, causing him to miss the rest of the 2013–14 season. At the end of the season, the team won the 2013–14 Swiss Super League championship.

To the start of the 2014–15 season he was still not able to play football due to the injury reoccurring and on 16 September the club announced that Ivanov had to undergo a second surgery (anterior cruciate ligament reconstruction) but the operation had been successful.

Ivanov had expected to recover for the start of the Euro 2016 qualifiers, receiving a call-up for the match against Azerbaijan, but was eventually deemed not fully fit.

He was still convalescent at the start of the 2015–16 season. In December 2015 Ivanov's contract with Basel was terminated in mutual consent, in order to be able to cope with his injury at his own pace.

During his time with the club Ivanov played a total of 20 games for Basel scoring one goal. 11 of these games were in the Swiss Super League, one in the Swiss Cup, six in the Champions League and two were friendly games. He scored his goal in the above-mentioned cup game.

=== Lokomotiv Plovdiv ===
After having trials at New York City FC, Ivanov was not able to sign because he was still recovering from a two-year long injury (torn ligaments). Instead he chose to return to his home country and signed a one-and-a-half-year contract with a former team of his, PFC Lokomotiv Plovdiv. He appeared in nine matches for Lokomotiv during the second half of the season.

=== Panathinaikos ===
On 28 June 2016, Ivanov signed a contract with Super League Greece club Panathinaikos until the summer of 2019. He scored his first goal in a 1–1 Europa League game against Danish side Brøndby IF; a game which saw his team secure a place in the group phases of the tournament. Since joining the club, he had been a solid starter for Panathinaikos while manager Andrea Stramaccioni was in charge. However, after Marinos Ouzounidis took over, he was no longer a first-team choice for the club, especially after the defensive mistake that helped Apollon Smyrnis open the scoring in the Greek Cup match between the two (Panathinaikos eventually won 4–3); instead, discussions within Panathinaikos were made as to whether Ivanov would remain at the club even as a backup for the first team or would be completely released from his contract. He was released from Panathinaikos on 24 January 2017 by mutual consent.

=== Arsenal Tula ===
On 1 February 2017, Ivanov joined Russian Premier League club FC Arsenal Tula on a 1.5-year contract. On 11 July 2017, Arsenal announced that Ivanov would be leaving the team.

=== Altay ===
In June 2018, Ivanov signed for two years with newly promoted to TFF First League side Altay.

=== Vihren Sandanski ===
In late June 2019, he returned to Bulgaria, signing a contract with Third League club Vihren Sandanski.

=== Etar ===
Ivanov was part of the Etar squad during the autumn of 2019.

=== Retirement ===
After struggling with injuries during the later stages of his career, on 22 May 2020 Ivanov announced his retirement from football.

== International career ==
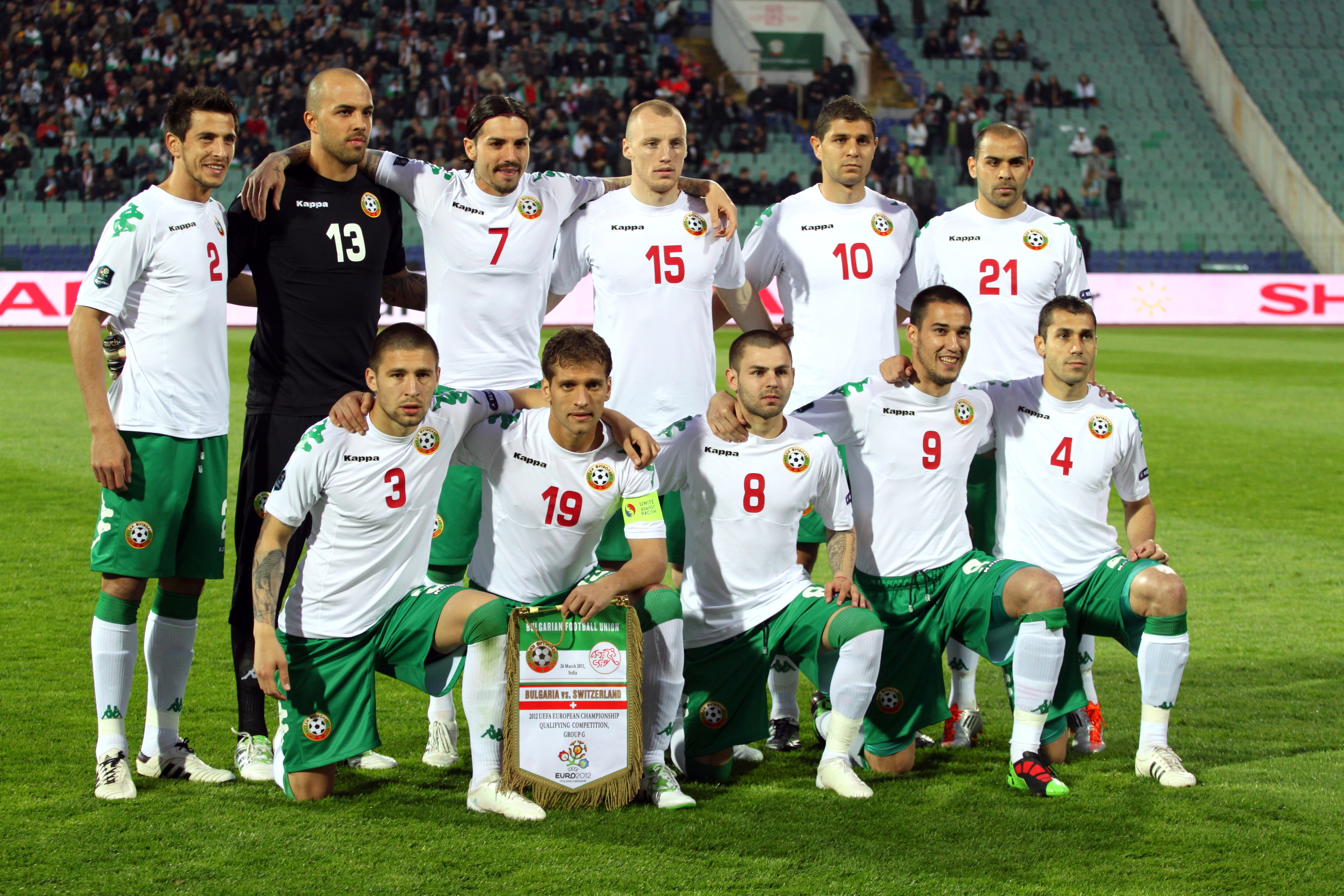
Ivanov (#15) on the starting line against Switzerland (2011)

=== Youth ===
Ivanov represented Bulgaria at all national levels, including U-17, U-19 and U-21 teams. On 10 June 2009, he scored his only goal for the under-21 side in a 4–3 loss against Israel U-21. Ivanov also served as team captain in the absence of Nikolay Mihaylov.

=== Senior ===
Ivanov made his debut for the senior national team on 20 August 2008, in a 2–1 win against Bosnia and Herzegovina, during which he entered the match as a substitute in the 67th minute. He also came on as a substitute for the naturalized Brazilian Lúcio Wagner in a World Cup qualifier against Italy on 10 October 2008. He played the full 90 minutes in another World Cup qualifier against Georgia five days later, which also ended in a scoreless draw. On 10 October 2009, Ivanov earned his fourth cap in a 4–1 away loss against Cyprus, attracting some criticism from the media for defensive mistakes. Nonetheless, he played in the next match against Georgia.

On 6 September 2011, Ivanov netted his first national team goal, opening the scoring in a 3–1 away loss against Switzerland in a Euro 2012 qualifier. He became an integral part of the national team in the following years. After missing the qualifiers for Euro 2016 through injury, Ivanov made his return to the team on 6 September 2016, in the 4–3 win over Luxembourg in a 2018 World Cup qualification match.

== Career statistics ==
=== Club ===
As of 17 March 2018

Appearances and goals by club, season and competition
Club	Season	League		Cup		Continental		Super Cup		Total	
Club	Season	Apps	Goals	Apps	Goals	Apps	Goals	Apps	Goals	Apps	Goals
CSKA Sofia	2005–06	6	0	0	0	0	0	0	0	6	0
CSKA Sofia	2006–07	6	0	0	0	1	0	0	0	7	0
CSKA Sofia	Total	12	0	0	0	1	0	0	0	13	0
Lokomotiv Plovdiv	2007–08	24	0	0	0	0	0	0	0	24	0
CSKA Sofia	2008–09	30	5	3	0	0	0	1	0	34	5
CSKA Sofia	2009–10	11	1	1	0	8	1	0	0	20	2
CSKA Sofia	Total	41	6	4	0	8	1	1	0	54	7
Alania Vladikavkaz	2010	24	2	4	0	0	0	0	0	28	2
Alania Vladikavkaz	2011–12	0	0	0	0	0	0	0	0	0	0
Alania Vladikavkaz	Total	24	0	4	0	0	0	0	0	28	0
Partizan	2011–12	30	4	3	0	6	0	–		39	4
Partizan	2012–13	29	4	0	0	12	2	–		41	6
Partizan	2013–14	0	0	0	0	3	0	–		3	0
Partizan	Total	59	8	3	0	21	2	–		83	10
Basel	2013–14	11	0	1	1	6	0	–		18	1
Basel	2014–15	0	0	0	0	0	0	–		0	0
Basel	2015–16	0	0	0	0	0	0	–		0	0
Basel	Total	11	0	1	1	6	0	–		18	1
Lokomotiv Plovdiv	2015–16	9	0	0	0	0	0	–		9	0
Panathinaikos	2016–17	7	0	3	0	9	1	–		19	1
Arsenal Tula	2016–17	5	0	0	0	–		–		6	0
Beroe Stara Zagora	2017–18	21	1	1	0	–		–		22	1
Altay	2018–19	6	0	1	0	–		–		7	0
Etar	2019–20	11	0	1	0	–		–		12	0
Career total		226	17	18	1	45	4	1	0	290	22

=== International ===
As of 9 September 2016

Appearances and goals by national team and year
National team	Year	Apps	Goals
Bulgaria	2008	3	0
Bulgaria	2009	2	0
Bulgaria	2010	9	0
Bulgaria	2011	9	1
Bulgaria	2012	8	0
Bulgaria	2013	8	2
Bulgaria	2016	1	0
Total		40	3

Scores and results list Bulgaria's goal tally first.

#	Date	Venue	Opponent	Score	Result	Competition
1	6 September 2011	St. Jakob-Park, Basel	Switzerland	1–0	1–3	UEFA Euro 2012 qualifying
2	22 March 2013	Vasil Levski National Stadium, Sofia	Malta	6–0	6–0	2014 FIFA World Cup qualifying
3	4 June 2013	Almaty Central Stadium, Almaty	Kazakhstan	2–0	2–1	Friendly

== Honours ==
CSKA Sofia

- Bulgarian Cup: 2005–06
- Bulgarian Supercup: 2006, 2008

Partizan

- Serbian SuperLiga: 2011–12, 2012–13

Basel

- Swiss Super League: 2013–14, 2014–15
- Swiss Cup runner-up: 2013–14, 2014–15

Individual

- FK Partizan Player of the Year: 2012
- Serbian SuperLiga Team of the Season: 2012–13
- Bulgarian Footballer of the Year: 2013
