= Darko Brašanac =

Serbian footballer (born 1992)

Personal information
- Date of birth: 12 February 1992 (age 34)
- Place of birth: Čajetina, SFR Yugoslavia
- Height: 1.78 m (5 ft 10 in)
- Position: Midfielder

Youth career
- 1998–2005: Zlatibor Čajetina
- 2005–2010: Partizan

Senior career*
Years	Team	Apps	(Gls)
2010–2016	Partizan	82	(7)
2011–2012	→ Smederevo (loan)	24	(2)
2016–2019	Betis	25	(1)
2017–2018	→ Leganés (loan)	23	(2)
2018–2019	→ Alavés (loan)	24	(0)
2019–2024	Osasuna	108	(4)
2024–2025	Leganés	45	(1)
2025–2026	Málaga	11	(1)

International career^{‡}
2008–2009	Serbia U17 (Note: Only official UEFA matches included)	6	(1)
2009–2011	Serbia U19	14	(1)
2013–2015	Serbia U21	17	(1)
2015–2016	Serbia	3	(0)
- * Club domestic league appearances and goals as of 3 June 2026 ‡ National team caps and goals as of 1 June 2017

Darko Brašanac (Serbian Cyrillic: Дарко Брашанац; born 12 February 1992) is a Serbian professional footballer who plays as a midfielder.

Brašanac represented his country at all youth international levels, collecting more than 35 appearances, before making his senior team debut in 2015.

== Club career ==
=== Partizan ===
After starting out at his local club Zlatibor Čajetina at the age of 6, Brašanac moved to Partizan still as a trainee in 2005. He was one of the most promising members of the team led by Slađan Šćepović that won numerous international youth tournaments. Consequently, Brašanac was promoted to the senior squad in January 2010. He made his competitive debut for Partizan in a 2–0 away league win over Hajduk Kula on 14 March 2010, coming on as an 80th-minute substitute for Cléo. Until the end of the 2009–10 season, Brašanac recorded two more league appearances, as the club won its third consecutive championship title.

In June 2010, alongside Marko Šćepović and Matija Nastasić, Brašanac signed his first professional contract with Partizan. He made his first appearance of the new season on 4 September 2010, replacing Saša Ilić in a 2–0 home league victory over Hajduk Kula. On 8 December 2010, Brašanac made his UEFA Champions League debut in a 1–3 away loss to Arsenal at Emirates Stadium, coming on as an injury-time substitute for Almami Moreira. He made six appearances in all competitions in the 2010–11 campaign, as the club won the double.

In August 2011, Brašanac was sent on a six-month loan to Smederevo. He scored his first senior career goal on 26 October 2011, netting the equalizer in a 1–1 Serbian Cup draw with Sloboda Užice. They eventually went through to the next round on penalties. In February 2012, Brašanac was loaned back to Smederevo until the end of the season. He scored his first league goal on 4 March 2012, finding the back of the net in a 1–0 away win over BSK Borča. In total, Brašanac made 24 league appearances and scored two goals in the 2011–12 campaign.

After a season-long loan, Brašanac returned to Partizan, but was rarely chosen to play in the first half of the 2012–13 campaign, making only two national cup appearances. He eventually received more playing time in the second half of the season, often playing in the starting lineup. Brašanac netted his first goal for the club on 6 March 2013, scoring directly from a corner kick in a 4–0 away league win over BSK Borča.

On 7 December 2013, Brašanac scored his first goal of the current season, netting the winner in a 1–0 away victory over Čukarički. He subsequently signed a contract which would keep him at the club until the summer of 2017. Afterwards, Brašanac became a first team regular, missing only one out of 15 league games in the second part of the 2013–14 campaign. He continued to play regularly early into the 2014–15 season, making all six starts in qualifications for UEFA competitions, before suffering a broken rib while playing for the national youth team in September 2014. After fully recovering, Brašanac returned to the starting lineup after winter break, helping Partizan win the championship.

In the 2015–16 season, Brašanac was an undisputed starter for Partizan, recording 40 appearances and scoring four goals in all competitions, as the club won the domestic cup after five years.

=== Betis ===
In August 2016, Brašanac was transferred to Spanish club Betis on a five-year deal. He made his official debut for the Andalusian side on 11 September 2016, playing the full 90 minutes and receiving a yellow card in a 3–2 away win against Valencia. On 23 April 2017, Brašanac scored his first goal in La Liga, giving his team a 1–0 win away at Celta.

==== Loans to Leganés and Alavés ====
On 30 August 2017, Brašanac was loaned to fellow top tier club CD Leganés for one year. Roughly one year later, he joined Deportivo Alavés in the same category, also in a temporary deal.

=== Osasuna ===
On 22 July 2019, Brašanac agreed to a three-year contract with newly promoted side CA Osasuna, for a fee of € 1 million and an additional €750,000 in add-ons, with Betis retaining 10% of a future sale; his release clause was set at €8 million.

=== Return to Leganés ===
On 1 February 2024, Brašanac returned to Lega on a contract until the end of the season.

== International career ==
Brašanac was a regular member of the Serbia national under-17 team. He also represented Serbia at the 2011 UEFA Under-19 Championship. They reached the semi-final of the tournament and were eliminated from the competition by the Czech Republic. In early 2013, Brašanac made his debut for the Serbia U21s and immediately became a regular member of the team. He scored his first goal for the under-21 side in a 3–0 away win over Belgium on 5 March 2014. Brašanac was also a member of the final squad at the 2015 UEFA Under-21 Championship.

On 4 September 2015, Brašanac made his full international debut for Serbia, playing the full 90 minutes in a 2–0 UEFA Euro 2016 qualifier win over Armenia. He was also an unused substitute in the team's last two UEFA Euro 2016 qualifying games against Albania and Portugal in October 2015. His third and final international was a March 2016 friendly match away against Estonia.

== Career statistics ==
=== Club ===
As of 20 March 2023

Appearances and goals by club, season and competition
Club	Season	League			Cup		Continental		Total	
Club	Season	Division	Apps	Goals	Apps	Goals	Apps	Goals	Apps	Goals
Partizan	2009–10	Serbian SuperLiga	3	0	0	0	0	0	3	0
Partizan	2010–11	Serbian SuperLiga	4	0	1	0	1 (Note: Appearance(s) in UEFA Champions League)	0	6	0
Partizan	2012–13	Serbian SuperLiga	11	1	2	1	0	0	13	2
Partizan	2013–14	Serbian SuperLiga	18	2	1	0	2 (Note: One appearance in UEFA Champions League, one appearance in UEFA Europa League)	0	21	2
Partizan	2014–15	Serbian SuperLiga	17	1	3	1	6 (Note: Four appearances in UEFA Champions League, two appearances in UEFA Europa League)	0	26	2
Partizan	2015–16	Serbian SuperLiga	25	3	5	0	10 (Note: Six appearances and one goal in UEFA Champions League, four appearances in UEFA Europa League)	1	40	4
Partizan	2016–17	Serbian SuperLiga	4	0	0	0	2 (Note: Appearance(s) in UEFA Europa League)	0	6	0
Partizan	Total		82	7	12	2	21	1	115	10
Smederevo (loan)	2011–12	Serbian SuperLiga	24	2	3	1	—		27	3
Betis	2016–17	La Liga	25	1	1	0	—		26	1
Leganés (loan)	2017–18	La Liga	23	2	5	0	—		28	2
Alavés (loan)	2018–19	La Liga	18	0	2	0	—		20	0
Osasuna	2019–20	La Liga	31	0	2	0	—		33	0
Osasuna	2020–21	La Liga	16	2	1	0	—		17	2
Osasuna	2021–22	La Liga	35	1	1	0	—		36	1
Osasuna	2022–23	La Liga	25	1	7	1	—		32	2
Osasuna	2023–24	La Liga	0	0	0	0	0	0	0	0
Osasuna	Total		107	4	11	1	—		118	5
Leganés	2023–24	Segunda División	14	0	0	0	0	0	14	0
Career total			293	16	34	4	21	1	348	21

=== International ===
As of 7 May 2018

Appearances and goals by national team and year
National team	Year	Apps	Goals
Serbia	2015	1	0
Serbia	2016	2	0
Total		3	0

== Honours ==
Partizan

- Serbian SuperLiga: 2009–10, 2010–11, 2012–13, 2014–15
- Serbian Cup: 2010–11, 2015–16

Leganés

- Segunda División: 2023–24
