= Dejan Babić =

Serbian footballer

Dejan Babić Дејан Бабић
Personal information
- Date of birth: 20 April 1989 (age 37)
- Place of birth: Belgrade, SFR Yugoslavia
- Height: 1.85 m (6 ft 1 in)
- Position: Attacking midfielder

Youth career
- Sinđelić Beograd

Senior career*
Years	Team	Apps	(Gls)
2007–2008	Radnički Beograd	15	(2)
2008–2011	BSK Borča	79	(9)
2011–2014	Partizan	5	(0)
2013	→ Sloboda Užice (loan)	9	(1)
2014	→ Rad (loan)	9	(0)
2014	→ Borac Čačak (loan)	9	(0)
2015–2016	Maccabi Yavne	32	(4)
2016–2017	Bežanija	7	(1)
2017	Novi Pazar	8	(0)
2017–2018	Bežanija	3	(0)
2018	Vitez	5	(0)
2018–2019	Mačva Šabac	13	(0)
2019–2021	Žarkovo	41	(4)
2021–2022	Prva Iskra Barič	0	(0)
2022	Brodarac		
2022–2023	Kacer Belanovica		
- * Club domestic league appearances and goals as of 22 August 2021

Dejan Babić (Serbian Cyrillic: Дејан Бабић; born 20 April 1989) is a Serbian retired footballer who played as a midfielder.

== Career ==
On 26 July 2015 signed to Maccabi Yavne.
