= Zvonimir Vukić =

Serbian footballer (born 1979)

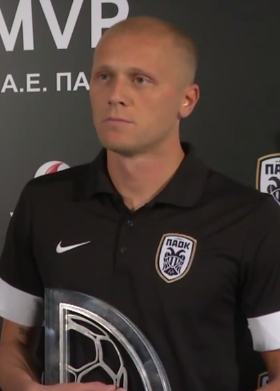
- Vukić with PAOK in 2013

Personal information
- Full name: Zvonimir Vukić
- Date of birth: 19 July 1979 (age 47)
- Place of birth: Zrenjanin, SR Serbia, SFR Yugoslavia
- Height: 1.82 m (6 ft 0 in)
- Position: Attacking midfielder

Youth career
- Proleter Zrenjanin

Senior career*
Years	Team	Apps	(Gls)
1996–1998	Proleter Zrenjanin	36	(3)
1998–2000	Atlético Madrid B	40	(4)
2000–2003	Partizan	86	(44)
2003–2008	Shakhtar Donetsk	73	(12)
2005–2006	→ Portsmouth (loan)	9	(1)
2006	→ Partizan (loan)	2	(0)
2008–2010	Moscow	27	(5)
2011–2012	Partizan	34	(16)
2013–2014	PAOK	35	(12)
2014–2015	Veria	3	(0)
Total		345	(97)

International career
1998–1999	FR Yugoslavia U21 (Note: Official UEFA matches only)	2	(0)
2003–2006	Serbia and Montenegro	26	(6)
- * Club domestic league appearances and goals

Zvonimir Vukić (Serbian Cyrillic: Звонимир Вукић; born 19 July 1979) is a Serbian former professional footballer who played as an attacking midfielder.

The Serbia and Montenegro international scored six goals in 26 appearances for the national team, which included selection for the 2006 FIFA World Cup.

== Club career ==
Vukić started out at his hometown club Proleter Zrenjanin, making his senior debut in the 1996–97 season, aged 17. He became a first-team regular in the following 1997–98 campaign, attracting the attention of numerous domestic and foreign clubs. In the summer of 1998, Vukić was snapped by Spanish club Atlético Madrid.

After spending almost two years with Atlético's B team, playing in the Segunda División, Vukić returned to his homeland and signed with Partizan in April 2000. He made a name for himself over the next four seasons with the Crno-beli, scoring 52 goals across all competitions. In the 2002–03 season, Vukić was the league's top scorer with 22 goals, as Partizan won the title.

In June 2003, Vukić signed a five-year contract with Ukrainian runners-up Shakhtar Donetsk. He was their top scorer with 13 goals in all competitions during his debut season. In his second year at the club, Vukić helped the side win the championship despite being scoreless in the process. He also made his UEFA Champions League debut that season against the likes of Barcelona and Milan.

In August 2005, Vukić was loaned to Premier League side Portsmouth until the end of the 2005–06 season. He scored his first goal for Portsmouth in a 4–1 win over Sunderland on 29 October 2005. However, after the sacking of manager Alain Perrin and reinstatement of former manager Harry Redknapp, Vukić was deemed surplus to requirements.

In January 2006, Vukić found himself back in familiar territory, having been loaned to his former club Partizan for the rest of the 2005–06 season. He rejoined the Belgrade side just a few days following Danko Lazović's comeback. Unfortunately, Vukić broke a foot in a friendly game against Ural Yekaterinburg, managing to play just two competitive matches after a long pause.

After his contract with Shakhtar Donetsk expired in the summer of 2008, Vukić joined Moscow. However, the Ukrainian club claimed that they have a valid contract with the player. Eventually, FIFA allowed Vukić to play for the Russian club in October 2008. He scored on his debut for the side in a league fixture against Terek Grozny on 2 November 2008. After the club folded in February 2010, Vukić became a free agent.

=== Third stint at Partizan ===
In May, and November 2010, after training with the club for several months, Vukić was again linked to Partizan, but no deal was concluded. He eventually signed with his former club on 31 January 2011, penning a one-year deal. Vukić chose the number 80 shirt and was officially presented together with Ghanaian international Prince Tagoe. He helped Partizan win the double, scoring from the penalty spot in the Serbian Cup final against Vojvodina.

At the start of the 2011–12 campaign, Vukić acquired his old number 10 shirt. He opened the season with a goal against Shkëndija in the second qualifying round of the UEFA Champions League. However, after weak form in August 2011, Vukić became the subject of fans' criticism, briefly dropping from the first team.

On 21 September 2011, Vukić returned to the lineup and scored a goal in the Serbian Cup first round against Novi Pazar. He then scored a brace in his first league game after six rounds for a 2–0 victory over Spartak Subotica on 15 October 2011. In the next 30 days, Vukić netted five more, including three league and two cup goals. He also scored the opening goal in a 2–0 away win against arch-rivals on 26 November 2011, becoming a fans favorite again. In the last two rounds of the first half of the season, Vukić scored two more goals to complete his fantastic performances in late 2011.

On 24 January 2012, after much speculation, Vukić signed another one-year contract with Partizan. He continued his good performances in the second half of the season, being named in the SuperLiga Team of the Season. However, Vukić was removed from the squad in August 2012, because of disagreements with reappointed manager Vladimir Vermezović.

=== Career in Greece ===
On 30 January 2013, Vukić joined PAOK on a free transfer, signing a one-and-a-half-year deal. He played three matches in the Super League Greece until the end of the 2012–13 regular season, scoring two goals in his first two appearances for the club against Panionios and Panathinaikos. Vukić also recorded four appearances in the Super League playoffs.

On 26 April 2014, Vukić was the only scorer for his team in the Greek Cup final, converting a penalty in the 70th minute of their 4–1 loss to Panathinaikos. He was also one of the team's top scorers in the 2013–14 season, with 15 goals in all competitions, before eventually leaving PAOK at the end of his contract.

On 7 September 2014, Vukić joined Veria on a free transfer, signing a one-year contract. He was given the number 99 shirt. On 12 February 2015, Vukić terminated his contract with Veria by mutual consent.

== International career ==
Vukić earned 26 caps for Serbia and Montenegro, making his full international debut in a 2–2 home draw with Azerbaijan on 12 February 2003. He scored his first national team goal in a 3–2 win over Wales at Millennium Stadium on 11 October 2003.

Vukić was a regular member of the team during the 2006 FIFA World Cup qualification, scoring four goals in the process. He was included in the final 23-man squad for the 2006 FIFA World Cup, despite having been in the process of convalescence after a long break due to foot injury. Eventually, Vukić made one appearance in the final tournament, coming in from the bench in a 6–0 loss to Argentina.

== Career statistics ==
=== Club ===
Appearances and goals by club, season and competition
Club	Season	League			Cup		Continental		Super Cup		Total	
Club	Season	Division	Apps	Goals	Apps	Goals	Apps	Goals	Apps	Goals	Apps	Goals
Proleter Zrenjanin	1996–97	First League of FR Yugoslavia	6	0			—		—		6	0
Proleter Zrenjanin	1997–98	First League of FR Yugoslavia	30	3			4	0	—		34	3
Proleter Zrenjanin	Total		36	3			4	0	—		40	3
Atlético Madrid B	1998–99	Segunda División	31	4	—		—		—		31	4
Atlético Madrid B	1999–2000	Segunda División	9	0	—		—		—		9	0
Atlético Madrid B	Total		40	4	—		—		—		40	4
Partizan	1999–2000	First League of FR Yugoslavia	6	1	0	0	0	0	—		6	1
Partizan	2000–01	First League of FR Yugoslavia	21	7	4	3	2	0	—		27	10
Partizan	2001–02	First League of FR Yugoslavia	29	14	3	2	3	1	—		35	17
Partizan	2002–03	First League of Serbia and Montenegro	30	22	3	1	7	1	—		40	24
Partizan	Total		86	44	10	6	12	2	—		108	52
Shakhtar Donetsk	2003–04	Vyshcha Liha	27	10	4	1	5	2	—		36	13
Shakhtar Donetsk	2004–05	Vyshcha Liha	27	0	3	1	13	2	0	0	43	3
Shakhtar Donetsk	2005–06	Vyshcha Liha	2	0	0	0	0	0	0	0	2	0
Shakhtar Donetsk	2006–07	Vyshcha Liha	13	2	3	2	0	0	0	0	16	4
Shakhtar Donetsk	2007–08	Vyshcha Liha	4	0	3	0	1	0	1	0	9	0
Shakhtar Donetsk	Total		73	12	13	4	19	4	1	0	106	20
Portsmouth (loan)	2005–06	Premier League	9	1	0	0	—		—		9	1
Partizan (loan)	2005–06	Serbia and Montenegro SuperLiga	2	0	0	0	0	0	—		2	0
Moscow	2008	Russian Premier League	3	2	0	0	0	0	—		3	2
Moscow	2009	Russian Premier League	24	3	3	0	0	0	—		27	3
Moscow	Total		27	5	3	0	0	0	—		30	5
Partizan	2010–11	Serbian SuperLiga	13	3	1	1	0	0	—		14	4
Partizan	2011–12	Serbian SuperLiga	21	13	4	3	5	1	—		30	17
Partizan	2012–13	Serbian SuperLiga	0	0	0	0	2	0	—		2	0
Partizan	Total		34	16	5	4	7	1	—		46	21
PAOK	2012–13	Super League Greece	7	2	0	0	0	0	—		7	2
PAOK	2013–14	Super League Greece	28	10	5	4	5	1	—		38	15
PAOK	Total		35	12	5	4	5	1	—		45	17
Veria	2014–15	Super League Greece	3	0	0	0	—		—		3	0
Career total			345	97	36	18	47	8	1	0	429	123

=== International ===
Appearances and goals by national team and year
National team	Year	Apps	Goals
Serbia and Montenegro	2003	9	2
Serbia and Montenegro	2004	7	3
Serbia and Montenegro	2005	9	1
Serbia and Montenegro	2006	1	0
Total		26	6

== Honours ==
Partizan

- First League of FR Yugoslavia: 2001–02, 2002–03
- FR Yugoslavia Cup: 2000–01
- Serbian SuperLiga: 2010–11, 2011–12
- Serbian Cup: 2010–11

Shakhtar Donetsk

- Ukrainian Premier League: 2004–05, 2007–08
- Ukrainian Cup: 2003–04, 2007–08
- Ukrainian Super Cup: 2005

Individual

- FK Partizan Player of the Year: 2002
- First League of Serbia and Montenegro Top Scorer: 2002–03
- Serbian SuperLiga Team of the Season: 2011–12
