= Nikola Aksentijević =

Serbian footballer (born 1993)

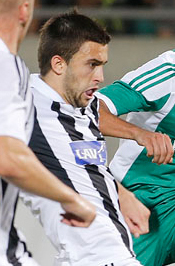
- Aksentijević with Partizan in 2013

Personal information
- Full name: Nikola Aksentijević
- Date of birth: 9 March 1993 (age 33)
- Place of birth: Kragujevac, FR Yugoslavia
- Height: 1.79 m (5 ft 10 in)
- Position: Right back

Youth career
- Radnički Kragujevac
- 2006–2010: Partizan

Senior career*
Years	Team	Apps	(Gls)
2010–2012	Partizan	17	(1)
2011	→ Teleoptik (loan)	10	(0)
2012–2014	Vitesse	0	(0)
2013–2014	→ Partizan (loan)	4	(0)
2014–2015	OFK Beograd	15	(0)
2015–2016	Mouscron-Péruwelz	19	(1)
2016–2017	Vojvodina	0	(0)
2017–2018	Radnički Niš	35	(1)
2019–2020	Napredak Kruševac	38	(0)
2020–2023	Radnički Niš	82	(1)
2023–2024	Ethnikos Achna	6	(0)
2024–2025	Javor Ivanjica	10	(0)

International career^{‡}
2009–2010	Serbia U17 (Note: Only official UEFA matches included)	6	(0)
2011–2012	Serbia U19	6	(1)
2013	Serbia U21	5	(0)
2017–	Serbia	2	(0)
- * Club domestic league appearances and goals as of 30 August 2025 ‡ National team caps and goals as of 21 August 2020

Nikola Aksentijević (Serbian Cyrillic: Никола Аксентијевић; born 9 March 1993) is a Serbian professional footballer who plays as a defender.

== Club career ==
Aksentijević started playing football with hometown club Radnički Kragujevac. He later joined the youth academy of Partizan in 2006. In October 2010, due to absence of numerous national team players, Aksentijević was one of five juniors who were invited to the first team for a rescheduled cup match against Mladost Apatin. He made his debut for the club as a substitute in that match, on 6 October 2010, which Partizan won 6–0.

In the 2011 winter transfer window, Aksentijević was loaned to Teleoptik. He made 10 league appearances until the end of the 2010–11 season. Originally a defensive midfielder, Aksentijević was converted into a right-back by Teleoptik manager Vuk Rašović during this period.

On 6 July 2011, Aksentijević signed his first professional contract with Partizan, on a five-year deal. He scored a long-range goal on his league debut against Sloboda Užice on 21 August 2011. However, Partizan lost the match 2–1.

On 31 August 2012, Aksentijević was officially transferred to Dutch side Vitesse. He failed to make his competitive debut for the club, playing exclusively for Vitesse's U21 team during the 2012–13 season.

On 20 June 2013, Aksentijević returned to Partizan on a season-long loan. He subsequently spent one season at OFK Beograd and one season at Mouscron-Péruwelz.

On 8 September 2016, Aksentijević was officially presented at Vojvodina.

== International career ==
Aksentijević represented Serbia at under-17, under-19 and under-21 level. He made his full international debut for Serbia on 14 November 2017, coming on as an injury-time substitute for Antonio Rukavina in a 1–1 friendly draw against South Korea in Ulsan.

== Career statistics ==
=== Club ===
As of 16 January 2019

Club	Season	League		Cup		Continental		Total	
Club	Season	Apps	Goals	Apps	Goals	Apps	Goals	Apps	Goals
Partizan	2010–11	0	0	1	0	0	0	1	0
Teleoptik (loan)	2010–11	10	0	0	0	—		10	0
Partizan	2011–12	14	1	2	0	2 (Note: Appearance(s) in UEFA Champions League)	0	18	1
Partizan	2012–13	3	0	0	0	5 (Note: Four appearances in UEFA Champions League, one appearance in UEFA Europa League)	0	8	0
Vitesse	2012–13	0	0	0	0	0	0	0	0
Partizan (loan)	2013–14	4	0	0	0	5 (Note: Three appearances in UEFA Champions League, two appearances in UEFA Europa League)	0	9	0
OFK Beograd	2014–15	15	0	1	0	—		16	0
Mouscron-Péruwelz	2015–16	19	1	2	0	—		21	1
Vojvodina	2016–17	0	0	0	0	0	0	0	0
Radnički Niš	2017–18	31	1	0	0	—		31	1
Radnički Niš	2018–19	4	0	1	0	1 (Note: Appearance(s) in UEFA Europa League)	0	6	0
Napredak	2018–19	15	0	1	0	—		16	0
Napredak	2019–20	23	0	0	0	—		23	0
Radnički Niš	2020–21	36	0	2	0	—		38	0
Radnički Niš	2021–22	33	1	1	0	—		34	1
Career total		207	4	11	0	13	0	230	4

=== International ===
As of 16 January 2019

National team	Year	Apps	Goals
Serbia	2017	1	0
Total		1	0

== Honours ==
Partizan

- Serbian SuperLiga: 2011–12
