= Nikola Petrović (footballer) =

Serbian footballer (born 1988)

Personal information
- Date of birth: 10 April 1988 (age 38)
- Place of birth: Belgrade, SFR Yugoslavia
- Height: 1.87 m (6 ft 1 1/2 in)
- Position: Goalkeeper

Team information
- Current team: Borac Čačak
- Number: 45

Senior career*
Years	Team	Apps	(Gls)
2006–2011	Teleoptik	93	(0)
2011–2014	Partizan	14	(0)
2015	Zavrč	8	(0)
2016–2019	Napredak Kruševac	122	(0)
2019–2020	Radnički Niš	20	(0)
2022	Timok	16	(0)
2022–2023	Železničar Pančevo	31	(0)
2024–	Borac Čačak	2	(0)
- * Club domestic league appearances and goals as of 1 July 2025

Nikola Petrović (Serbian Cyrillic: Никола Петровић; born 10 April 1988) is a Serbian professional footballer who plays as a goalkeeper for Borac Čačak.

== Career ==
After five seasons at Teleoptik, Petrović signed a contract with Partizan in the summer of 2011.

In the 2015 winter transfer window, Petrović moved to Slovenia and signed with Zavrč.

In early 2016, Petrović returned to his homeland and joined Napredak Kruševac.

== Honours ==
Partizan

- Serbian SuperLiga: 2011–12, 2012–13

Napredak Kruševac

- Serbian First League: 2015–16
