= Nemanja Rnić =

Serbian footballer

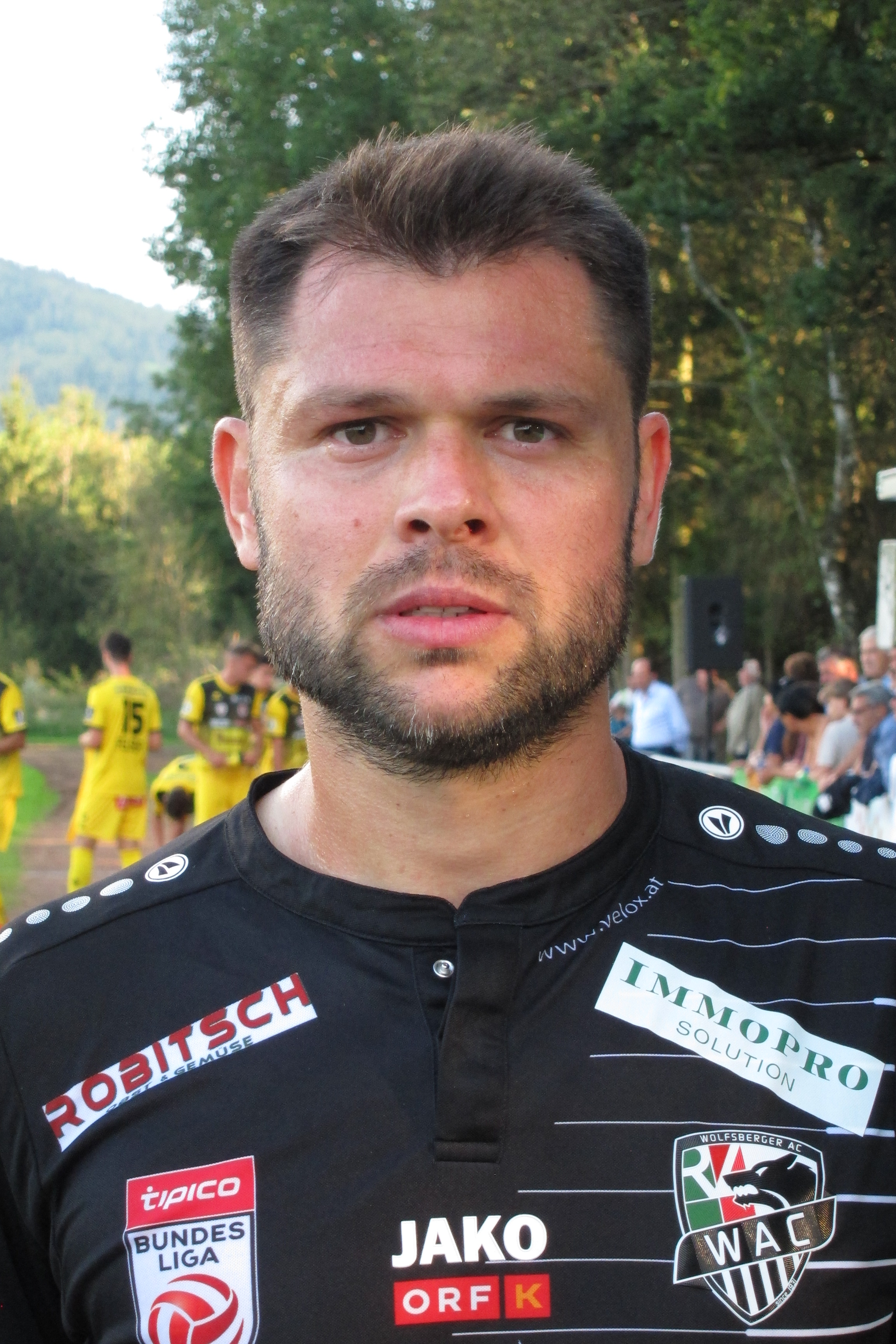
- Rnić with Wolfsberger AC in 2018

Personal information
- Date of birth: 30 September 1984 (age 42)
- Place of birth: Belgrade, SR Serbia, Yugoslavia
- Height: 1.80 m (5 ft 11 in)
- Position: Defender

Team information
- Current team: AEK Athens (assistant manager)

Youth career
- Partizan

Senior career*
Years	Team	Apps	(Gls)
2003–2008	Partizan	80	(2)
2008–2011	Anderlecht	16	(0)
2011	→ Germinal Beerschot (loan)	10	(0)
2011–2012	Partizan	25	(0)
2013	Hoverla Uzhhorod	13	(0)
2013–2021	Wolfsberger AC	183	(3)
Total		327	(5)

International career
2004–2007	Serbia U21 (Note: Only official UEFA matches included)	11	(0)
2005–2008	Serbia	3	(0)
Medal record
Silver medal – second place	UEFA Under-21 Championship	2007
- * Club domestic league appearances and goals

Nemanja Rnić (Serbian Cyrillic: Немања Рнић, pronounced [němaɲa ř̩niɕ]; born 30 September 1984) is a Serbian former professional footballer who played as a defender. He is an assistant manager for Greek Super League club AEK Athens.

== Club career ==
In June 2003, Rnić signed his first professional contract with Partizan on a five-year deal. He won two national championship titles and one national cup, before moving abroad to Belgian club Anderlecht on a free transfer in June 2008. Over the following three seasons, Rnić made less than 30 competitive appearances for the Brussels-based club, before being loaned to fellow Pro League side Germinal Beerschot in January 2011.

In July 2011, Rnić returned to Partizan and signed a one-year contract. He made 25 league appearances in the 2011–12 season, helping the club win its fifth consecutive title. After more than six months without a club, Rnić signed a contract with Ukrainian side Hoverla Uzhhorod in March 2013. He subsequently moved to Austria and joined Wolfsberger AC in August 2013. Over the next six years, Rnić made over 150 league appearances and scored three goals.

== International career ==
Rnić represented Serbia and Montenegro at the 2006 UEFA Under-21 Championship in Portugal. He also represented Serbia at the 2007 UEFA Under-21 Championship in the Netherlands, as the team finished as runners-up.

On 8 June 2005, Rnić made his senior debut for Serbia and Montenegro in a friendly against Italy at the Rogers Centre in Toronto, as the game ended 1–1. He also made two appearances for Serbia in 2008, both under the managerial reign of Miroslav Đukić.

== Career statistics ==
=== Club ===
Appearances and goals by club, season and competition
Club	Season	League		Cup		Continental		Total	
Club	Season	Apps	Goals	Apps	Goals	Apps	Goals	Apps	Goals
Partizan	2003–04	8	1	1	0	0	0	9	1
Partizan	2004–05	17	2	3	0	7	0	27	2
Partizan	2005–06	10	0	0	0	1	0	11	0
Partizan	2006–07	20	0	3	0	7	0	30	0
Partizan	2007–08	25	0	3	0	1	0	29	0
Partizan	Total	80	3	10	0	16	0	106	3
Anderlecht	2008–09	7	0	1	0	1	0	9	0
Anderlecht	2009–10	6	0	2	0	1	0	9	0
Anderlecht	2010–11	3	0	1	0	2	0	6	0
Anderlecht	Total	16	0	4	0	4	0	24	0
Germinal Beerschot (loan)	2010–11	10	0	0	0	—		10	0
Partizan	2011–12	25	0	4	0	4	0	33	0
Hoverla Uzhhorod	2013–14	13	0	0	0	—		13	0
Wolfsberger AC	2013–14	24	1	2	0	—		26	1
Wolfsberger AC	2014–15	21	1	1	0	—		22	1
Wolfsberger AC	2015–16	23	0	0	0	0	0	23	0
Wolfsberger AC	2016–17	27	0	1	0	—		28	0
Wolfsberger AC	2017–18	33	0	2	0	—		35	0
Wolfsberger AC	2018–19	20	1	2	0	—		22	1
Wolfsberger AC	2019–20	25	0	3	0	5	0	33	0
Wolfsberger AC	2020–21	10	0	3	0	5	0	18	0
Wolfsberger AC	Total	183	3	14	0	10	0	207	3
Career total		327	6	32	0	34	0	393	6

=== International ===
Appearances and goals by national team and year
National team	Year	Apps	Goals
Serbia and Montenegro	2005	1	0
Serbia and Montenegro	2006	0	0
Serbia	2006	0	0
Serbia	2007	0	0
Serbia	2008	2	0
Total		3	0

== Honours ==
Partizan

- Serbian SuperLiga: 2004–05, 2007–08, 2011–12
- Serbian Cup: 2007–08

Anderlecht

- Belgian Pro League: 2009–10
- Belgian Super Cup: 2010

Serbia

- UEFA Under-21 Championship runner-up: 2007
