= Eduardo Pacheco (Brazilian footballer) =

Brazilian footballer (born 1987)

Eduardo
Personal information
- Full name: Eduardo Ferreira Abdo Pacheco
- Date of birth: 22 March 1987 (age 39)
- Place of birth: Ribeirão Preto, Brazil
- Height: 1.87 m (6 ft 2 in)
- Position: Forward

Senior career*
Years	Team	Apps	(Gls)
2007–2010	Atlético Mineiro	24	(6)
2008–2009	→ Gaziantepspor (loan)	21	(1)
2009	→ Atlético Paranaense (loan)	2	(0)
2009	→ Sport Recife (loan)	6	(0)
2010–2011	São Caetano	37	(17)
2011–2012	Partizan	16	(4)
2013	São Caetano	6	(0)
2013–2014	Joinville	13	(3)
2014	Bragantino		
- * Club domestic league appearances and goals

Eduardo Ferreira Abdo Pacheco (born 22 March 1987), or simply Eduardo Pacheco, is a Brazilian former professional footballer who played as a forward.

== Career ==
Born in Ribeirão Preto, São Paulo, Eduardo started playing football with his hometown club Botafogo. In 2004, he joined Atlético Mineiro youth categories. Afterwards, Eduardo was promoted to the first team, and he made his Série A debut in 2007. In August 2008, Eduardo moved to Europe and signed for Turkish Süper Lig club Gaziantepspor. After one season in Turkey, he returned to his homeland, and had a short loan spells with Atlético Paranaense and Sport Recife, both in 2009.

=== São Caetano ===
In January 2010, Eduardo signed for São Caetano, and scored 15 goals in 31 matches during the 2010 Série B season. On 2 April 2011, Eduardo scored five goals against São Bernardo in the 2011 Campeonato Paulista, a game which his team won 6–1.

=== Partizan ===
After an impressive season with São Caetano, Edu Pacheco garnered interest from the likes of European clubs like Red Star Belgrade and Partizan. Finally, on 22 June 2011, Eduardo signed a four-year contract with Partizan, however São Caetano remained in possession of 30% of players contract. The transfer was one of the most expensive in Partizan's history as it was worth €1.2 million.

After leaving Partizan Eduardo returned to Brazil where he played with São Caetano in the 2013 Campeonato Paulista and with Joinville in the 2013 Campeonato Brasileiro Série B. He then played with Bragantino in 2014.

== Career statistics ==
As of 28 June 2011

Club	Season	League		Cup		Continental		Total	
Club	Season	Apps	Goals	Apps	Goals	Apps	Goals	Apps	Goals
Atlético Mineiro	2007	9	3	0	0	0	0	9	3
Atlético Mineiro	2008	15	3	1	2	0	0	16	5
Gaziantepspor	2008–09	21	1	4	3	0	0	25	4
Atlético Paranaense	2009	2	0	0	0	0	0	2	0
Sport Recife	2009	6	0	0	0	0	0	6	0
São Caetano	2010	31	15	0	0	0	0	31	15
São Caetano	2011	6	2	0	0	0	0	6	2
Partizan	2011–12	16	4	2	0	6	1	24	5
Brazil		69	23	1	2	0	0	70	25
Turkey		21	1	4	3	0	0	25	4
Serbia		16	4	2	0	6	1	24	5
Career total		98	27	6	5	6	1	111	33

== Honours ==
Atlético Mineiro

- Campeonato Mineiro: 2007

Partizan

- Serbian SuperLiga: 2011–12

Joinville

- Copa Santa Catarina: 2013
