= Dragan Đurić =

Serbian businessman, economist

- Born: 20 January 1954 (age 72); Osinja, Derventa, SFR Yugoslavia
- Known for: President of Partizan Belgrade
- Board member of: ZEKSTRA Group (C.E.O.)

Dragan Đurić (Serbian Cyrillic: Драган Ђурић; born 20 January 1954) is a Serbian businessman, economist and former president of FK Partizan football club. He is also a president and owner of ZEKSTRA Group.

== FK Partizan ==
On 23 July 2008 he was selected as president of FK Partizan. His predecessor was Tomislav Karadžić.

Preceded by Tomislav Karadžić	President of FK Partizan; 2008–2014	Succeeded by Zoran Popović
