= 2014–15 FK Čukarički season =

Čukarički
2014–15 season
- President: Miodrag Janković
- Head coach: Vladan Milojević
- Serbian SuperLiga: 3rd
- Serbian Cup: Winners
- UEFA Europa League: Second qualifying round
- Top goalscorer: League: Igor Matić (10); All: Nikola Stojiljković (14)

The 2014–15 season is FK Čukarički´s 2nd straight season in Serbian SuperLiga. This article shows player statistics and all official matches that the club played during the 2014–15 season.

== Players ==
=== Squad list ===
Note: Flags indicate national team as defined under FIFA eligibility rules; some limited exceptions apply. Players may hold more than one non-FIFA nationality.

No.	Pos.	Nation	Player
1	GK	SRB	Borivoje Ristić
2	DF	SRB	Jovan Simić
3	DF	SRB	Đorđe Bašanović
4	DF	BRA	Lucas Piasentin
5	DF	NGR	Ugo Ukah
6	MF	SRB	Dragoljub Srnić
7	FW	SRB	Staniša Mandić
8	MF	SRB	Ivan Todorović
9	FW	SRB	Nikola Stojiljković
10	MF	SRB	Igor Matić (captain)
11	FW	SRB	Andrija Pavlović
12	GK	SRB	Nemanja Stevanović
14	MF	SRB	Slavoljub Srnić
16	FW	BIH	Budimir Šarčević

No.	Pos.	Nation	Player
18	FW	SRB	Luka Ratković
17	DF	SRB	Nikola Janković
19	MF	BIH	Tigran Goranović
20	MF	GHA	Obeng Regan
21	MF	SRB	Aleksandar Alempijević
22	DF	SRB	Filip Stojković
23	DF	SRB	Bojan Ostojić
24	MF	SRB	Petar Bojić
25	DF	MNE	Dejan Boljević
30	FW	SRB	Nenad Mirosavljević
31	DF	SRB	Rajko Brežančić
33	GK	SRB	Vladan Grbović
35	GK	SRB	Dušan Čubraković
77	DF	SRB	Zoran Rendulić

=== Top scorers ===
Includes all competitive matches. The list is sorted by shirt number when total goals are equal.

Position	Nation	Number	Name	League	Cup	Europe	Total
1	(Serbia)	9	Nikola Stojiljković	9	3	2	14
2	(Serbia)	10	Igor Matić	10	3	—	13
3	(Serbia)	14	Slavoljub Srnić	8	2	1	11

== Players ==
=== In ===
Date	Position	Nation	Name	From	Type
17 August	MC	(Ghana)	Obeng Regan	Napredak	Transfer
21 August	DC	(Nigeria)	Ugo Ukah	Jagiellonia	Sign

== Matches ==
=== Serbian SuperLiga ===
Date	Round	Opponents	Ground	Result	Scorers	Position
9 August 2014	1	Napredak	A	2-0	Pavlović 52′, Mirosavljević 90′	5th
16 August 2014	2	Novi Pazar	H	1-1	Bojić 76′	4th
23 August 2014	3	Borac	A	0-0	—	7th
30 August 2014	4	Voždovac	H	2-0	S. Srnić 17′, Matić 73′	4th
13 September 2014	5	Partizan	A	2-4	Stojiljković 41′, S. Srnić 42′	5th
20 September 2014	6	Donji Srem	H	1-1	Mirosavljević 75′	7th
29 September 2014	7	Rad	A	3-1	Matić 15′, 48′, Mirosavljević 83′	5th
4 October 2014	8	Radnički Niš	A	1-2	Mandić 90+1′	6th
18 October 2014	9	Radnički 1923	H	4-1	Regan 28′, 41′, Terić (OG) 38′, S. Srnić 80′	4th
25 October 2014	10	OFK Beograd	A	4-0	Matić 27′, 69′, S. Srnić 50′, Bojić 88′	4th
1 November 2014	11	Mladost	H	1-0	Matić 69′	4th
8 November 2014	12	Crvena Zvezda	A	0-0	—	4th
23 November 2014	13	Jagodina	H	0-3	—	4th
29 November 2014	14	Vojvodina	A	2-1	Todorović 45′, Stojiljković 73′	4th
7 December 2014	15	Spartak	H	2-0	Todorović 83′, Stojiljković 89′	4th
21 February 2015	16	Napredak	H	1-0	Todorović 35′	3rd
28 February 2015	17	Novi Pazar	A	2-1	Matić 21′, S. Srnić 47′	3rd
7 March 2015	18	Borac	H	1-1	Matić 50′	3rd
14 March 2015	19	Voždovac	A	0-0	—	3rd
22 March 2015	20	Partizan	H	2-2	Bojić 8′, Stojiljković 74′	3rd
4 April 2015	21	Donji Srem	A	2-1	S. Srnić 19′, Stojiljković 72′	3rd
13 April 2015	22	Rad	H	7-0	Rendulić 6′, Stojiljković 12′, 90′, Matić 20′, Gnjatić (OG) 57′, S. Srnić 71′, Todorović 83′	3rd
18 April 2015	23	Radnički Niš	H	1-1	Brežančić 22′	3rd
25 April 2015	24	Radnički 1923	A	1-0	Rendulić 40′	3rd
29 April 2015	25	OFK Beograd	H	1-0	S. Srnić 29′	3rd
2 May 2015	26	Mladost	A	2-2	Regan 5′, Lucas 27′	3rd
9 May 2015	27	Crvena Zvezda	H	2-0	Stojiljković 45′, Matić 62′	3rd
16 May 2015	28	Jagodina	A	1-0	Stojiljković 71′	3rd
23 May 2015	29	Vojvodina	H	0-1	—	3rd
30 May 2015	30	Spartak	A	0-1	—	3rd

=== Serbian Cup ===
Date	Round	Opponents	Ground	Result	Scorers
26 September 2014	1/16	Mladost	H	3-2	Stojiljković 19′, Matić 25′, 45′
19 November 2014	1/8	OFK Beograd	A	2-1	Stojiljković 33′, Matić 50′
4 December 2014	1/4	Vojvodina	H	2-1	Regan 10′, Bojić 47′
18 March 2015	1/2	Voždovac	H	2-0	Mirosavljević 15′, 39′
8 April 2015	1/2	Voždovac	A	4-1	Ostojić 7′, S. Srnić 63′, Stojiljković 74′, Mandić 90′
20 May 2015	F	Partizan	N	1-0	S. Srnić 38′

=== UEFA Europa League ===
Date	Round	Country	Opponents	Ground	Result	Scorers
3 July 2014	1st QR	(Andorra)	Sant Julià	H	4-0	Mirosavljević 8′, Bojić 49′, S. Srnić 89′, Stojiljković (p) 90+′
10 July 2014	1st QR	(Andorra)	Sant Julià	A	0-0	—
17 July 2014	2nd QR	(Austria)	SV Grodig	H	0-4	—
24 July 2014	2nd QR	(Austria)	SV Grodig	A	2-1	Bojić 61′, Stojiljković 65′
