= 2013–14 FK Čukarički season =

Čukarički
2013–14 season
- Chairman: Miodrag Janković; Dragan Obradović
- Manager: Vladan Milojević
- Stadium: Stadion Čukarički
- Serbian SuperLiga: 3rd
- Serbian Cup: 2nd Round
- Top goalscorer: League: Stojiljković (5); All: Stojiljković (5)
- Highest home attendance: 4,000 vs Red Star (6 October 2013)
- Lowest home attendance: 400 vs Novi Pazar (23 November 2013)
- Average home league attendance: 2,000
Home colours	Away colours

This is the club's first season in Serbian SuperLiga since being relegated in 2011.

== Fixtures ==
Date	Opponents	H / A	Result F–A	Scorers	Attendance	League position
10 August 2013	Rad	A	1–0	Todorović 5'	1,550	5th
18 August 2013	Sloboda	H	1–0	Matić 30' (pen.)	4,000	1st
24 August 2013	OFK Beograd	A	2–1	Stojiljković 25', Sekulić 50'	800	1st
1 September 2013	Vojvodina	H	0–0		4,000	3rd
14 September 2013	Javor	A	2–0	S.Srnić 51', Stojiljković 64'	600	2nd
21 September 2013	Jagodina	H	0–0		2,000	2nd
29 September 2013	Napredak	A	1–2	Stojković 90'	3,500	2nd
6 October 2013	Red Star	H	2–0	Stojiljković 1', S.Srnić 75'	4,000	2nd
19 October 2013	Donji Srem	A	1–1	Stojiljković 60'	1,200	2nd
26 October 2013	Voždovac	H	2–3	D.Srnić 13', Brežančić 79'	800	3rd
3 November 2013	Spartak	A	0–3		600	6th
9 November 2013	Radnički 1923	A	1–0	Tintor 39' (o.g.)	1,500	5th
23 November 2013	Novi Pazar	H	1–1	Piasentin 85'	400	3rd
30 November 2013	Radnički Niš	A	0–1		3,000	6th
7 December 2013	Partizan	H	0–1		2,000	7th
22 February 2014	Rad	H	2–0	Todorović 31', Mirosavljević 90+3'	1,000	6th
2 March 2014	Sloboda	A	2–1	Matić 12', Stojiljković 27'	3,000	4th
8 March 2014	OFK Beograd	H	1–0	Mirosavljević 60'	1,000	3rd
15 March 2014	Vojvodina	A	1–1	Piasentin 82'	4,000	3rd
22 March 2014	Javor	H	2–0	Mirosavljević 60', Dimić 64'	1,000	3rd

== League table ==
Pos	Team	Pld	W	D	L	GF	GA	GD	Pts	Qualification or relegation
3	Jagodina (Q)	30	13	9	8	40	30	+10	48	Qualification for Europa League second qualifying round (Note: Vojvodina won the 2013–14 Serbian Cup, therefore qualified for the second qualifying round of the 2014–15 UEFA Europa League)
4	Vojvodina (Q)	30	11	12	7	38	32	+6	45	Qualification for Europa League second qualifying round
5	Čukarički (Q)	30	12	8	10	30	31	−1	44	Qualification for Europa League first qualifying round
6	Radnički	30	10	13	7	28	22	+6	43	
7	Voždovac	30	12	6	12	34	35	−1	42	

Source: Serbian SuperLiga
Rules for classification: 1) points; 2) head-to-head points; 3) head-to-head goal difference; 4) head-to-head goals scored; 5) goal difference; 6) number of goals scored.
(Q) Qualified for the phase indicated

== Serbian Cup ==
Date	Round	Opponents	H / A	Result F–A	Scorers	Attendance
25 September 2013	1st Round	Smederevo	A	1–0	Sekulić 37'	400
30 October 2013	2nd Round	Jagodina	H	0–2		800

=== Squad statistics ===
No.	Name	League		Cup		Europe		Total		Discipline	
No.	Name	Apps	Goals	Apps	Goals	Apps	Goals	Apps	Goals	Yellow card	Red card
Goalkeepers
1	(Serbia) Borivoje Ristić	20	0	2	0	0	0	22	0	3	0
Defenders
Left	(Serbia) Dejan Stamenković	10	0	1	0	0	0	11	0	2	0
4	(Brazil) Lucas Piasentin	18	2	2	0	0	0	20	2	4	1
5	(Serbia) Slobodan Lalić	1	0	0	0	0	0	1	0	0	0
6	(Serbia) Dragoljub Srnić	20	1	2	0	0	0	22	1	4	0
19	(Serbia) Deni Pavlović	14	0	1	0	0	0	15	0	2	0
23	(Serbia) Bojan Ostojić	14	0	1	0	0	0	15	0	4	0
25	(Montenegro) Dejan Boljević	11	0	1	0	0	0	12	0	0	0
31	(Serbia) Rajko Brežančić	19	1	1	0	0	0	20	1	5	0
17	(Serbia) Nikola Janković	3	0	2	0	0	0	5	0	0	0
22	(Serbia) Filip Stojković	19	1	1	0	0	0	20	1	4	0
Midfielders
26	(Serbia) Srđan Grujičić	6	0	1	0	0	0	7	0	2	0
27	(Serbia) Đorđe Radovanović	1	0	0	0	0	0	1	0	0	0
8	(Serbia) Ivan Todorović	19	2	2	0	0	0	21	2	6	0
11	(Serbia) Aleksandar Stojiljković	2	0	2	0	0	0	4	0	0	0
33	(Serbia) Nikola Krčmarević	9	0	1	0	0	0	10	0	1	0
14	(Serbia) Slavoljub Srnić	20	2	2	0	0	0	22	2	3	0
10	(Serbia) Igor Matić	18	3	1	0	0	0	19	3	3	0
15	(Serbia) Stefan Dimić	3	1	0	0	0	0	3	1	0	0
Forwards
9	(Serbia) Nikola Stojiljković	20	5	2	0	0	0	22	5	3	0
24	(Serbia) Petar Bojić	5	0	0	0	0	0	5	0	1	0
Left	(Serbia) Slobodan Dinčić	4	0	1	0	0	0	5	0	0	0
7	(Montenegro) Radislav Sekulić	15	1	2	1	0	0	17	2	4	0
33	(Serbia) Nenad Mirosavljević	4	3	0	0	0	0	4	3	0	0
