= Milan Ilić =

Milan Ilić may refer to:

- Milan Ilić (footballer, born 1987), Serbian football centre back
- Milan Ilić (footballer, born 2000), Serbian football right back
- Milan Ilić (politician) (born 1990), Serbian politician
