= Derby da Madeira =

Portuguese football club rivalry

The Derby da Madeira (English: Madeira derby) is the biggest football derby match on the island of Madeira, Portugal. Throughout the history of football in Madeira a rivalry thrived between the so-called "big three" from Madeira. This rivalry is particularly marked by the dominance of CS Marítimo over CF União and CD Nacional. Following the dissolution of União in 2021, the derby is now only contested between Nacional and Marítimo.

Here are the results of the derbies in national competitions and the comparative records of the three clubs.

== Derby results ==
=== Overall ===
Club	Pld	W	D	L	GF	GA	GD	Win Ratio
Marítimo	73	33	27	13	103	73	39	45.21
Nacional	81	21	30	30	92	108	-16	25.93
União	52	12	17	23	60	74	-14	23.08

=== Marítimo vs Nacional ===
Club	Pld	W	D	L	GF	GA	GD	Win Ratio
Marítimo	51	20	20	11	67	54	13	39.23
Nacional	51	11	20	20	54	67	-13	22.00

==== League ====
		Marítimo vs Nacional				Nacional vs Marítimo			
Season	Division	Date	Venue	Score	Attendance	Date	Venue	Score	Attendance
1981–82	Segunda Divisão	21 March 1982	Estádio dos Barreiros	3 – 0	-	18 October 1981	Estádio dos Barreiros	1 – 1	-
1983–84	Segunda Divisão	18 September 1983	Estádio dos Barreiros	2 – 0	-	5 February 1984	Estádio dos Barreiros	1 – 1	-
1984–85	Segunda Divisão	5 May 1985	Estádio dos Barreiros	2 – 1	-	16 December 1984	Estádio dos Barreiros	1 – 2	-
1988–89	Primeira Divisão	6 November 1988	Estádio dos Barreiros	0 – 0	15,000	25 March 1989	Estádio dos Barreiros	1 – 1	11,000
1989–90	Primeira Divisão	13 October 1989	Estádio dos Barreiros	2 – 2	10,000	9 February 1990	Estádio dos Barreiros	0 – 0	5,000
1990–91	Primeira Divisão	10 March 1991	Estádio dos Barreiros	1 – 0	5,000	4 November 1990	Estádio dos Barreiros	0 – 0	12,000
2002–03	Primeira Liga	1 February 2003	Estádio dos Barreiros	2 – 3	10,000	14 September 2002	Estádio Eng. Rui Alves	0 – 0	4,000
2003–04	Primeira Liga	18 April 2004	Estádio dos Barreiros	2 – 0	-	13 December 2003	Estádio Eng. Rui Alves	0 – 1	-
2004–05	Primeira Liga	7 April 2005	Estádio dos Barreiros	2 – 1	5,000	18 November 2004	Estádio Eng. Rui Alves	1 – 1	2,000
2005–06	Primeira Liga	15 April 2006	Estádio dos Barreiros	2 – 0	10,000	9 December 2005	Estádio Eng. Rui Alves	2 – 1	2,000
2006–07	Primeira Liga	26 August 2006	Estádio dos Barreiros	1 – 0	8,000	29 January 2007	Estádio Eng. Rui Alves	3 – 2	2,000
2007–08	Primeira Liga	16 April 2008	Estádio dos Barreiros	1 – 0	4,000	12 November 2007	Estádio da Madeira	0 – 2	2,250
2008–09	Primeira Liga	3 November 2008	Estádio dos Barreiros	4 – 2	6,057	16 March 2009	Estádio da Madeira	1 – 1	3,294
2009–10	Primeira Liga	19 February 2010	Estádio dos Barreiros	1 – 1	4,200	20 September 2009	Estádio da Madeira	2 – 1	2,557
2010–11	Primeira Liga	8 April 2011	Estádio dos Barreiros	1 – 1	4,200	12 November 2010	Estádio da Madeira	0 – 0	3,000
2011–12	Primeira Liga	7 April 2012	Estádio dos Barreiros	2 – 4	4,233	26 November 2011	Estádio da Madeira	2 – 2	3,000
2012–13	Primeira Liga	9 December 2012	Estádio dos Barreiros	2 – 0	4,203	21 April 2013	Estádio da Madeira	2 – 1	3,791
2013–14	Primeira Liga	8 December 2013	Estádio do Marítimo	2 – 2	7,075	12 April 2014	Estádio da Madeira	2 – 0	2,467
2014–15	Primeira Liga	20 April 2015	Estádio do Marítimo	1 – 1	6,822	8 December 2014	Estádio da Madeira	3 – 0	2,862
2015–16	Primeira Liga	2 April 2016	Estádio do Marítimo	2 – 0	7,098	27 November 2015	Estádio da Madeira	3 – 1	3,927
2016–17	Primeira Liga	19 February 2017	Estádio do Marítimo	0 – 0	10,357	16 September 2016	Estádio da Madeira	2 – 0	2,776
2018–19	Primeira Liga	31 March 2019	Estádio do Marítimo	3 – 2	8,972	10 November 2018	Estádio da Madeira	1 – 0	2,981
2020–21	Primeira Liga	31 October 2020	Estádio do Marítimo	0 – 0	0	12 March 2021	Estádio da Madeira	1 – 2	0
2023–24	Segunda Liga	21 January 2024	Estádio do Marítimo	3 – 1	10,385	12 August 2023	Estádio da Madeira	1 – 2	4,293

==== Taça de Portugal ====
Season	Round	Date	Venue	Home team	Score	Away team	Attendance
1981–82	Round of 32	10 January 1982	Estádio dos Barreiros	Marítimo	2 – 1 (a.e.t.)	Nacional	-
2002–03	Fourth Round	23 November 2002	Estádio Eng. Rui Alves	Nacional	1 – 1 (a.e.t.) (5 – 4 p)	Marítimo	-
2014–15	Quarter-finals	8 January 2015	Estádio do Marítimo	Marítimo	1 – 1 (a.e.t.) (5 – 6 p)	Nacional	6,000

=== Marítimo vs União ===
Club	Pld	W	D	L	GF	GA	GD	Win Ratio
Marítimo	22	13	7	2	36	19	17	59.09
União	22	2	7	13	19	36	-17	9.09

==== League ====
		Marítimo vs União				União vs Marítimo			
Season	Division	Date	Venue	Score	Attendance	Date	Venue	Score	Attendance
1981–82	Segunda Divisão	7 February 1982	Estádio dos Barreiros	3 – 0	-	15 September 1981	Estádio dos Barreiros	0 – 1	-
1983–84	Segunda Divisão	11 December 1983	Estádio dos Barreiros	1 – 1	-	15 April 1984	Estádio dos Barreiros	0 – 0	-
1984–85	Segunda Divisão	16 September 1984	Estádio dos Barreiros	3 – 1	-	27 January 1985	Estádio dos Barreiros	0 – 1	-
1989–90	Primeira Divisão	13 May 1990	Estádio dos Barreiros	1 – 0	12,000	14 January 1990	Estádio dos Barreiros	0 – 0	7,000
1990–91	Primeira Divisão	28 October 1990	Estádio dos Barreiros	2 – 1	8,000	24 March 1991	Estádio dos Barreiros	1 – 1	7,000
1991–92	Primeira Divisão	15 March 1992	Estádio dos Barreiros	3 – 1	13,000	27 October 1991	Estádio dos Barreiros	1 – 1	3,000
1993–94	Primeira Divisão	9 January 1994	Estádio dos Barreiros	3 – 2	10,000	25 May 1994	Estádio dos Barreiros	1 – 1	10,000
1994–95	Primeira Divisão	8 January 1995	Estádio dos Barreiros	1 – 0	10,000	21 May 1995	Estádio dos Barreiros	2 – 2	4,000
2015–16	Primeira Liga	16 January 2016	Estádio do Marítimo	0 – 1	6,937	16 August 2015	Centro Desportivo da Madeira	2 – 1	2,500

==== Taça da Liga ====
Season	Round	Date	Venue	Home team	Score	Away team	Attendance
2011–12	Second Round	8 October 2011	Estádio dos Barreiros	União	2 – 3	Marítimo	1,112
2011–12	Second Round	12 November 2011	Estádio dos Barreiros	Marítimo	2 – 0	União	1,832
2016–17	Second Round	26 October 2016	Estádio do Marítimo	Marítimo	3 – 1	União	3,669
2017–18	Third round (group stage)	29 December 2017	Estádio do Marítimo	Marítimo	3 – 2	União	4,581

=== Nacional vs União ===
Club	Pld	W	D	L	GF	GA	GD	Win Ratio
União	30	10	10	10	41	38	3	33.33
Nacional	30	10	10	10	38	41	-3	33.33

==== League ====
		Nacional vs União				União vs Nacional			
Season	Division	Date	Venue	Score	Attendance	Date	Venue	Score	Attendance
1981–82	Segunda Divisão	27 December 1981	Estádio dos Barreiros	0 – 0	-	9 May 1982	Estádio dos Barreiros	1 – 2	-
1982–83	Segunda Divisão	19 September 1982	Estádio dos Barreiros	3 – 2	-	30 January 1983	Estádio dos Barreiros	1 – 1	-
1983–84	Segunda Divisão	4 March 1984	Estádio dos Barreiros	4 – 3	-	16 October 1983	Estádio dos Barreiros	3 – 2	-
1984–85	Segunda Divisão	21 October 1984	Estádio dos Barreiros	1 – 3	-	23 March 1985	Estádio dos Barreiros	3 – 1	-
1985–86	Segunda Divisão	15 September 1985	Estádio dos Barreiros	2 – 2	-	19 January 1986	Estádio dos Barreiros	0 – 0	-
1986–87	Segunda Divisão	15 March 1987	Estádio dos Barreiros	1 – 1	-	26 October 1986	Estádio dos Barreiros	1 – 2	-
1987–88	Segunda Divisão	1 May 1988	Estádio dos Barreiros	1 – 4	-	20 December 1987	Estádio dos Barreiros	1 – 1	-
1989–90	Primeira Divisão	26 November 1989	Estádio dos Barreiros	0 – 0	8,000	7 April 1990	Estádio dos Barreiros	3 – 2	3,000
1990–91	Primeira Divisão	26 May 1991	Estádio dos Barreiros	1 – 2	7,000	30 December 1990	Estádio dos Barreiros	1 – 0	4,000
1992–93	Segunda Divisão de Honra	17 October 1992	Estádio dos Barreiros	1 – 1	-	13 February 1993	Estádio dos Barreiros	1 – 1	-
1995–96	Segunda Divisão de Honra	14 January 1996	Estádio dos Barreiros	0 – 1	-	20 August 1995	Estádio dos Barreiros	1 – 2	-
1997–98	Segunda Divisão de Honra	22 March 1998	Estádio dos Barreiros	3 – 0	-	9 November 1997	Estádio dos Barreiros	1 – 0	-
1999–00	Segunda Divisão B	3 March 2000	Estádio Eng. Rui Alves	1 – 0	-	2 October 1999	Estádio dos Barreiros	0 – 0	-
2015–16	Primeira Liga	23 August 2015	Estádio da Madeira	1 – 0	3,761	23 January 2016	Centro Desportivo da Madeira	3 – 0	2,165
2017–18	Segunda Liga	25 November 2017	Estádio da Madeira	2 – 1	1,746	11 April 2018	Centro Desportivo da Madeira	1 – 3	2,489

== Clubs' titles ==
=== First team ===
Official competitions common to the three clubs and the number of titles won by each club.

International Competitions	Marítimo	União	Nacional
UEFA Cup/UEFA Europa League	-	-	-
Total International	0	0	0
National Competitions	Marítimo	União	Nacional
Primeira Divisão/Primeira Liga	-	-	-
Campeonato de Portugal	1	-	-
Taça de Portugal	-	-	-
Taça da Liga	-	-	-
Second tier	3	1	1
Third tier	-	2	1
Total National	4	3	2
Regional Competitions	Marítimo	União	Nacional
AF Madeira Championship	35	17	8
AF Madeira Cup	26	17	6
Total Regional	61	34	14
Total Official	65	37	16

=== Youth teams ===
List of the official competitions common to the three clubs throughout history and the number of titles won by each club.

Regional Competitions	Marítimo	Nacional	União
Madeira Championship (Under 19's)	37	10	5
Madeira Cup (Under 19's)	6	13	-
Madeira Championship (Under 17's)	34	16	2
Madeira Cup (Under 17's)	8	9	2
Madeira Championship (Under 15's)	18	14	2
Madeira Cup (Under 15's)	8	11	1
Madeira Championship of 11 players (Under 13's)	8	10	-
Madeira Championship of 7 players (Under 13's)	12	12	-
Total	131	95	12

NOTES:

- As of 8 July 2021
- União never competed in the European competitions.
- Marítimo never competed in the third tier.
- Attendances taken from
