= Nikola Stojiljković =

Serbian footballer

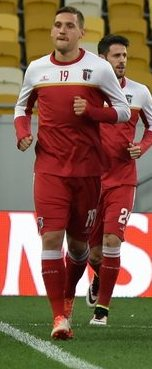
- Stojiljković with Braga in 2016

Personal information
- Date of birth: 17 August 1992 (age 34)
- Place of birth: Niš, FR Yugoslavia
- Height: 1.85 m (6 ft 1 in)
- Position: Forward

Team information
- Current team: Grafičar
- Number: 19

Youth career
- Filip Filipović
- –2006: Partizan
- 2006–2010: Rad

Senior career*
Years	Team	Apps	(Gls)
2009–2012	Rad	26	(5)
2013–2015	Čukarički	74	(25)
2015–2020	Braga	57	(15)
2017–2018	→ Kayserispor (loan)	13	(2)
2018	→ Red Star Belgrade (loan)	7	(3)
2019	→ Mallorca (loan)	4	(0)
2019–2020	→ Boavista (loan)	23	(2)
2020–2021	Farense	21	(3)
2021–2022	Piast Gliwice	8	(1)
2022–2023	Al-Riyadh	32	(18)
2023–2024	Dibba Al Fujairah	11	(1)
2024	Al-Kholood	15	(1)
2026–	Grafičar	11	(1)

International career
2009	Serbia U17 (Note: Only official UEFA matches included)	2	(0)
2009–2010	Serbia U19	5	(1)
2013	Serbia U21	3	(0)
2016	Serbia	4	(0)
- * Club domestic league appearances and goals as of 14 May 2026

Nikola Stojiljković (Serbian Cyrillic: Никола Стојиљковић, pronounced [nǐkola stojǐːʎkoʋitɕ]; born 17 August 1992) is a Serbian professional footballer who plays as a forward for Serbian First League club Grafičar.

== Club career ==
=== Rad ===
Born in Niš, Stojiljković spent his formatting years at Partizan and Rad. He made his Serbian SuperLiga debut with Rad on 30 May 2009, coming on as a substitute and providing a vital injury time assist in a 2–2 home draw with Vojvodina. During his tenure at Banjica, Stojiljković scored five goals in 26 league appearances, all of them in the 2011–12 season.

=== Čukarički ===
In the 2013 winter transfer window, Stojiljković moved to Serbian First League club Čukarički, scoring seven goals in 15 league appearances until the end of the 2012–13 season, thus helping them win promotion back to the top flight. With seven goals in the 2013–14 Serbian SuperLiga, Stojiljković was one of the most deserving for the team's success, finishing in fifth place in the competition, eventually securing them a spot in the 2014–15 UEFA Europa League. He scored two goals in the qualifying phase, including the winning goal against SV Grödig. Stojiljković finished the season as the club's top scorer with 14 goals in all competitions, helping them win the 2014–15 Serbian Cup, the club's first ever major title.

=== Braga ===
On 8 August 2015, Stojiljković was transferred to Portuguese club Braga, on a five-year deal. He made his debut for the club eight days later, coming on as a 61st-minute substitute for Rodrigo Pinho in a 2–1 home win over Nacional in the first game of the Primeira Liga season. Stojiljković scored his first goals as an Arsenalista on 21 September, a brace in a 5–1 win over Marítimo also at the Estádio Municipal de Braga.

In September 2017, Stojiljković moved on loan to the Turkish side Kayserispor. After the end of 2017–18 campaign, he returned to Serbia in June 2018, joining Red Star Belgrade on a one-year loan deal.

Stojiljković signed on loan for Spanish Segunda División club RCD Mallorca in late January 2019. He made only four substitute appearances as they won promotion, having a two-month injury lay-off with muscular injury.

On 12 August 2019, Stojiljković was loaned to fellow Primeira Liga club Boavista F.C. for the season.

=== Farense ===
On 24 August 2020, Stojiljković transferred to Primeira Liga newcomers S.C. Farense, who purchased 50% of his economic rights.

=== Piast Gliwice ===
On 20 August 2021, Stojiljković was transferred to Polish Ekstraklasa team Piast Gliwice, on a two-year contract.

=== Al-Riyadh ===
On 20 August 2022, Stojiljković joined Saudi Arabian club Al-Riyadh.

=== Dibba Al Fujairah ===
On 13 July 2023, Stojiljković joined UAE First Division League side Dibba Al Fujairah.

=== Al-Kholood ===
On 19 January 2024, Stojiljković joined Saudi Arabian club Al-Kholood.

== International career ==
Stojiljković represented his country at under-17, under-19 and under-21 level. He missed out on the 2015 UEFA European Under-21 Championship due to an injury.

In March 2016, Stojiljković received his first call-up for the senior team for friendlies against Poland and Estonia. He made his debut in the former on the 23rd, starting in a 1–0 defeat at the Stadion Miejski in Poznań and being substituted for Filip Đuričić after 56 minutes.

== Career statistics ==
As of end of 2019–20 season

=== Club ===
Appearances and goals by club, season and competition
Club	Season	League			National cup		League cup		Continental		Other		Total	
Club	Season	Division	Apps	Goals	Apps	Goals	Apps	Goals	Apps	Goals	Apps	Goals	Apps	Goals
Rad	2008–09	SuperLiga	1	0	0	0	—		—		—		1	0
Rad	2009–10	SuperLiga	1	0	0	0	—		—		—		1	0
Rad	2010–11	SuperLiga	4	0	0	0	—		—		—		4	0
Rad	2011–12	SuperLiga	19	5	1	0	—		1	0	—		21	5
Rad	2012–13	SuperLiga	1	0	0	0	—		—		—		1	0
Rad	Total		26	5	1	0	—		1	0	—		28	5
Čukarički	2012–13	First League	15 (Note: Several websites made confusion with statistics of a player. He recorded 15 league appearances and scored 7 goals for the season. During the season, other player with the same surname, Aleksandar Stojiljković, also played for Čukarički, scoring 3 goals in 17 matches.)	7	—		—		—		—		15	7
Čukarički	2013–14	SuperLiga	28	7	2	0	—		—		—		30	7
Čukarički	2014–15	SuperLiga	28	9	6	3	—		4	2	—		38	14
Čukarički	2015–16	SuperLiga	3	2	0	0	—		3	1	—		6	3
Čukarički	Total		74	25	8	3	—		7	3	—		89	31
Braga	2015–16	Primeira Liga	31	10	7	2	2	0	6	3	—		46	15
Braga	2016–17	Primeira Liga	24	5	2	1	2	1	5	2	1 (Note: Including an appearance in the Supertaça Cândido de Oliveira)	0	34	9
Braga	2017–18	Primeira Liga	2	0	—		0	0	3	1	—		5	1
Braga	Total		57	15	9	3	4	1	14	6	1	0	85	25
Kayserispor (loan)	2017–18	Süper Lig	13	2	4	0	—		—		—		17	2
Red Star Belgrade (loan)	2018–19	SuperLiga	7	3	2	2	—		6	0	—		15	5
Mallorca (loan)	2018–19	Segunda División	4	0	0	0	—		—		—		4	0
Boavista (loan)	2019–20	Primeira Liga	24	2	0	0	—		—		—		24	2
Career total			199	49	24	8	4	1	28	9	1	0	262	70

=== International ===
As of 16 June 2018

Appearances and goals by national team and year
National team	Year	Apps	Goals
Serbia	2016	4	0
Total		4	0

== Honours ==
Čukarički

- Serbian Cup: 2014–15

Braga

- Taça de Portugal: 2015–16

Individual

- Serbian SuperLiga Team of the Season: 2014–15
