= Dragoljub Srnić =

Serbian footballer

Personal information
- Date of birth: 12 January 1992 (age 34)
- Place of birth: Šabac, SFR Yugoslavia
- Height: 1.70 m (5 ft 7 in)
- Position: Defensive midfielder

Team information
- Current team: Mačva Šabac
- Number: 42

Youth career
- Mačva Šabac
- Red Star Belgrade

Senior career*
| Years | Team | Apps | (Gls) |
| 2010–2013 | Red Star Belgrade | 0 | (0) |
| 2011–2012 | → Sopot (loan) | 26 | (1) |
| 2012–2013 | → Čukarički (loan) | 29 | (1) |
| 2013–2017 | Čukarički | 114 | (4) |
| 2017–2018 | Śląsk Wrocław | 28 | (0) |
| 2019 | Voždovac | 15 | (1) |
| 2019–2021 | ŁKS Łódź | 35 | (1) |
| 2021–2023 | Radnički 1923 | 31 | (0) |
| 2023–2024 | Aiolikos | 18 | (1) |
| 2024– | Mačva Šabac | 34 | (0) |
- * Club domestic league appearances and goals as of 1 July 2025

Dragoljub Srnić (Serbian Cyrillic: Драгољуб Срнић; born 12 January 1992) is a Serbian professional footballer who plays as a defensive midfielder for Mačva Šabac. He is the twin brother of Slavoljub Srnić.

== Career ==
=== Red Star Belgrade ===
Born in Šabac, Srnić started his career with local club Mačva, before being acquired by Red Star Belgrade, along with his twin brother Slavoljub. The twins joined the first team in 2010, but Dragoljub failed to make any official senior appearance for the club. In order to gain experience, the twins were sent on dual registration to Serbian League Belgrade side Sopot. In summer 2012, they both moved on a one-year loan to Čukarički. Twins sued the club, but later removed accusation and had been sold in 2013.

=== Čukarički ===
In summer 2013, after a season-long loan in the Serbian First League, the Srnić brothers signed with Čukarički for an undisclosed fee. In his first two seasons, Dragoljub played regularly and made 50 SuperLiga appearances and scored 1 goal. He also made 8 cup appearances, winning the competition in 2014–15, and 4 caps in the 2014–15 UEFA Europa League qualifications. On 11 September 2015, Srnić scored both goals in 2–0 win over Radnik Surdulica in 9 fixture of the 2015–16 season. At Čukarički, Srnić made 169 appearances and scored 6 goals in all competitions over five seasons. He was also vice-captain to Igor Matić. After the contract expired, he left the club in summer 2017.

=== Śląsk Wrocław ===
On 4 July 2017, Srnić signed a two-year contract with Polish Ekstraklasa side Śląsk Wrocław, with an option for an extension. He made his debut for new club in 2–0 defeat against Arka Gdynia on 16 July 2017.

== Career statistics ==
As of 15 December 2017

Appearances and goals by club, season and competition
| Club | Season | League | | | National cup (Note: Includes Serbian Cup, Polish Cup) | | Continental | | Other | | Total | |
| Club | Season | Division | Apps | Goals | Apps | Goals | Apps | Goals | Apps | Goals | Apps | Goals |
|---|---|---|---|---|---|---|---|---|---|---|---|---|
| Red Star Belgrade | 2010–11 | Serbian SuperLiga | 0 | 0 | 0 | 0 | 0 | 0 | — | | 0 | 0 |
| Red Star Belgrade | 2011–12 | Serbian SuperLiga | 0 | 0 | 0 | 0 | 0 | 0 | — | | 0 | 0 |
| Red Star Belgrade | Total | | 0 | 0 | 0 | 0 | 0 | 0 | — | | 0 | 0 |
| Sopot (loan) | 2010–11 | Serbian League Belgrade | 0 | 0 | — | | — | | — | | 0 | 0 |
| Sopot (loan) | 2011–12 | Serbian League Belgrade | 26 | 1 | — | | — | | — | | 26 | 1 |
| Sopot (loan) | Total | | 26 | 1 | — | | — | | — | | 26 | 1 |
| Čukarički (loan) | 2012–13 | Serbian First League | 29 | 1 | 2 | 0 | — | | — | | 31 | 1 |
| Čukarički | 2013–14 | Serbian SuperLiga | 29 | 1 | 2 | 0 | — | | — | | 31 | 1 |
| Čukarički | 2014–15 | Serbian SuperLiga | 21 | 0 | 6 | 0 | 4 (Note: Appearances in UEFA Europa League) | 0 | — | | 31 | 0 |
| Čukarički | 2015–16 | Serbian SuperLiga | 34 | 2 | 2 | 0 | 4 | 0 | — | | 40 | 2 |
| Čukarički | 2016–17 | Serbian SuperLiga | 30 | 1 | 4 | 1 | 2 | 0 | — | | 36 | 2 |
| Čukarički | Total | | 143 | 5 | 16 | 1 | 10 | 0 | — | | 169 | 6 |
| Śląsk Wrocław | 2017–18 | Ekstraklasa | 28 | 0 | 1 | 0 | — | | — | | 29 | 0 |
| Career total | | | 197 | 6 | 17 | 1 | 10 | 0 | — | | 224 | 7 |

== Honours ==
Čukarički

- Serbian Cup: 2014–15
