= 2015–16 Primeira Liga =

82nd season of top-tier Portuguese football

Primeira Liga
- Season: 2015–16
- Dates: 14 August 2015 – 15 May 2016
- Champions: Benfica; 35th title
- Relegated: União da Madeira; Académica
- Champions League: Benfica; Sporting CP; Porto
- Europa League: Braga; Arouca; Rio Ave
- Matches: 306
- Goals: 831 (2.72 per match)
- Best player: Jonas
- Top goalscorer: Jonas (32 goals)
- Best goalkeeper: Rui Patrício
- Biggest home win: Benfica 6–0 Belenenses (11 September 2015); Paços de Ferreira 6–0 União da Madeira (12 December 2015); Benfica 6–0 Marítimo (6 January 2016)
- Biggest away win: Vitória de Setúbal 0–6 Sporting CP (6 January 2016)
- Highest scoring: Marítimo 5–2 Vitória de Setúbal (13 September 2015); Vitória de Guimarães 3–4 Marítimo (12 December 2015); Académica 4–3 Belenenses (14 December 2015); Moreirense 3–4 Vitória de Guimarães (6 January 2016); Tondela 3–4 Marítimo (21 February 2016); Belenenses 2–5 Sporting CP (4 April 2016); União da Madeira 3–4 Paços de Ferreira (17 April 2016)
- Longest winning run: 12 matches Benfica
- Longest unbeaten run: 14 matches Benfica; Porto
- Longest winless run: 15 matches Vitória de Setúbal
- Longest losing run: 6 matches Académica; Tondela
- Highest attendance: 64,235; Benfica 4–1 Nacional (15 May 2016)
- Lowest attendance: 705; Arouca 1–0 Estoril (6 January 2016)
- Total attendance: 3,313,851
- Average attendance: 10,830

The 2015–16 Primeira Liga (also known as Liga NOS for sponsorship reasons) was the 82nd season of the Primeira Liga, the top professional league for Portuguese association football clubs. The fixtures were determined by draw on 4 July 2015. The season began on 14 August 2015 and concluded on 15 May 2016.

Benfica won their third consecutive and 35th overall title, after beating Nacional 4–1 in their last match. They finished the league with a record 88 points in 34 matches (from 29 wins and one draw), two points more than runners-up Sporting CP.

Tondela and União da Madeira entered the season as the two promoted teams from the 2014–15 Segunda Liga. On the last matchday, both teams were at risk of returning to the second division, but the combination of their results dictated União da Madeira's relegation alongside Académica.

== Teams ==
For the second consecutive season, the league was contested by a total of 18 teams, which included the best 16 sides from the 2014–15 season and two promoted from the 2014–15 Segunda Liga.

Tondela made their debut in the top flight of Portuguese football, after winning the 2014–15 Segunda Liga title. while runners-up União da Madeira returned for the first time since the 1994–95 season. These two clubs replaced Gil Vicente, relegated after four seasons in the Primeira Liga, and Penafiel, who returned to the second division one season after being promoted.

For the first time since the 1990–91 season, the autonomous region of Madeira was again represented at the highest level of Portuguese football with three teams: União da Madeira, Marítimo and Nacional, all set in Funchal making the madeirense capital the second town having three teams in Primeira Liga after Lisbon.

=== Stadia and locations ===
Location of teams in 2015–16 Primeira Liga (Mainland)
Location of teams in 2015–16 Primeira Liga (Madeira)

| Team | Location | Stadium | Capacity | 2014–15 finish |
|---|---|---|---|---|
| Académica | Coimbra | Estádio Cidade de Coimbra | 29,744 | 14th |
| Arouca | Arouca | Estádio Municipal de Arouca | 5,000 | 16th |
| Belenenses | Lisbon | Estádio do Restelo | 19,856 | 6th |
| Benfica | Lisbon | Estádio da Luz | 64,642 | 1st |
| Boavista | Porto | Estádio do Bessa | 30,000 | 13th |
| Braga | Braga | Estádio Municipal de Braga | 30,286 | 4th |
| Estoril | Estoril | Estádio António Coimbra da Mota | 8,000 | 12th |
| Marítimo | Funchal | Estádio dos Barreiros | 7,200 | 9th |
| Moreirense | Moreira de Cónegos | Parque de Jogos Comendador Joaquim de Almeida Freitas | 6,153 | 11th |
| Nacional | Funchal | Estádio da Madeira | 5,586 | 7th |
| Paços de Ferreira | Paços de Ferreira | Estádio Capital do Móvel | 6,404 | 8th |
| Porto | Porto | Estádio do Dragão | 50,035 | 2nd |
| Rio Ave | Vila do Conde | Estádio dos Arcos | 9,065 | 10th |
| Sporting CP | Lisbon | Estádio José Alvalade | 50,044 | 3rd |
| Tondela | Tondela | Estádio João Cardoso | 5,000 | 1st (SL) |
| União da Madeira | Funchal | Centro Desportivo da Madeira (Note: Due to lighting problems, União da Madeira played some TV broadcast home matches at Estádio da Madeira.) | 2,500 | 2nd (SL) |
| Vitória de Guimarães | Guimarães | Estádio D. Afonso Henriques | 30,008 | 5th |
| Vitória de Setúbal | Setúbal | Estádio do Bonfim | 13,468 | 15th |

=== Personnel and sponsors ===
| Team | Head manager | Manufacturer | Sponsors |
|---|---|---|---|
| Académica | (Portugal) Filipe Gouveia | Nike | EFAPEL |
| Arouca | (Angola) Lito Vidigal | Joma | Banco BIC |
| Belenenses | (Spain) Julio Velázquez | Lacatoni | Kia Motors |
| Benfica | (Portugal) Rui Vitória | Adidas | Emirates |
| Boavista | (Bolivia) Erwin Sánchez | Erreà | Mestre da Cor |
| Braga | (Portugal) Paulo Fonseca | Lacatoni | — |
| Estoril | (Brazil) Fabiano | Nike | Banco BIC |
| Marítimo | (Portugal) Nelo Vingada | Nike | Santander Totta |
| Moreirense | (Portugal) Miguel Leal | cdt | — |
| Nacional | (Portugal) Manuel Machado | Hummel | Santander Totta |
| Paços de Ferreira | (Portugal) Jorge Simão | Lacatoni | Banco BIC |
| Porto | (Portugal) José Peseiro | New Balance | MEO |
| Rio Ave | (Portugal) Pedro Martins | Lacatoni | MEO |
| Sporting CP | (Portugal) Jorge Jesus | Macron | NOS |
| Tondela | (Portugal) Petit | cdt | Laboratórios BASI |
| União da Madeira | (Portugal) Luís Norton de Matos | Lacatoni | Museu CR7 |
| Vitória de Guimarães | (Portugal) Sérgio Conceição | Nike | Banco BIC |
| Vitória de Setúbal | (Portugal) Quim Machado | Hummel | KIA |

=== Managerial changes ===
| Team | Outgoing manager | Manner of departure | Date of vacancy | Position in table | Incoming manager | Date of appointment |
|---|---|---|---|---|---|---|
| União da Madeira | (Portugal) Vítor Oliveira | Mutual consent | 24 May 2015 | Pre-season | (Portugal) Luís Norton de Matos | 9 June 2015 |
| Arouca | (Portugal) Pedro Emanuel | Contract expired | 25 May 2015 | Pre-season | (Angola) Lito Vidigal | 1 June 2015 |
| Vitória de Setúbal | (Portugal) Bruno Ribeiro | Contract expired | 26 May 2015 | Pre-season | (Portugal) Quim Machado | 29 May 2015 |
| Tondela | (Portugal) Quim Machado | Resigned | 27 May 2015 | Pre-season | (Portugal) Vítor Paneira | 30 May 2015 |
| Belenenses | (Portugal) Jorge Simão | Contract expired | 3 June 2015 | Pre-season | (Portugal) Ricardo Sá Pinto | 9 June 2015 |
| Sporting CP | (Portugal) Marco Silva | Sacked | 4 June 2015 | Pre-season | (Portugal) Jorge Jesus | 5 June 2015 |
| Benfica | (Portugal) Jorge Jesus | Contract expired | 4 June 2015 | Pre-season | (Portugal) Rui Vitória | 15 June 2015 |
| Braga | (Portugal) Sérgio Conceição | Sacked | 5 June 2015 | Pre-season | (Portugal) Paulo Fonseca | 11 June 2015 |
| Paços de Ferreira | (Portugal) Paulo Fonseca | Signed by Braga | 11 June 2015 | Pre-season | (Portugal) Jorge Simão | 15 June 2015 |
| Vitória de Guimarães | (Portugal) Rui Vitória | Signed by Benfica | 15 June 2015 | Pre-season | (Portugal) Armando Evangelista | 20 June 2015 |
| Académica | (Portugal) José Viterbo | Resigned | 20 September 2015 | 18th | (Portugal) Filipe Gouveia | 24 September 2015 |
| Vitória de Guimarães | (Portugal) Armando Evangelista | Resigned | 21 September 2015 | 13th | (Portugal) Sérgio Conceição | 23 September 2015 |
| Tondela | (Portugal) Vítor Paneira | Resigned | 6 October 2015 | 16th | (Portugal) Rui Bento | 6 October 2015 |
| Boavista | (Portugal) Petit | Resigned | 28 November 2015 | 14th | (Bolivia) Erwin Sánchez | 1 December 2015 |
| Tondela | (Portugal) Rui Bento | Resigned | 8 December 2015 | 18th | (Portugal) Petit | 9 December 2015 |
| Belenenses | (Portugal) Ricardo Sá Pinto | Resigned | 15 December 2015 | 13th | (Spain) Julio Velázquez | 16 December 2015 |
| Porto | (Spain) Julen Lopetegui | Sacked | 8 January 2016 | 3rd | (Portugal) Rui Barros | 8 January 2016 |
| Marítimo | (Portugal) Ivo Vieira | Resigned | 18 January 2016 | 10th | (Portugal) Nelo Vingada | 19 January 2016 |
| Porto | (Portugal) Rui Barros | Ended caretaking role | 21 January 2016 | 3rd | (Portugal) José Peseiro | 21 January 2016 |

== Season summary ==
=== League table ===
| Pos | Team | Pld | W | D | L | GF | GA | GD | Pts | Qualification or relegation |
|---|---|---|---|---|---|---|---|---|---|---|
| 1 | Benfica (C) | 34 | 29 | 1 | 4 | 88 | 22 | +66 | 88 | Qualification for the Champions League group stage |
| 2 | Sporting CP | 34 | 27 | 5 | 2 | 79 | 21 | +58 | 86 | Qualification for the Champions League group stage |
| 3 | Porto | 34 | 23 | 4 | 7 | 67 | 30 | +37 | 73 | Qualification for the Champions League play-off round |
| 4 | Braga | 34 | 16 | 10 | 8 | 54 | 35 | +19 | 58 | Qualification for the Europa League group stage (Note: Braga qualified for the Europa League group stage by winning the 2015–16 Taça de Portugal.) |
| 5 | Arouca | 34 | 13 | 15 | 6 | 47 | 38 | +9 | 54 | Qualification for the Europa League third qualifying round |
| 6 | Rio Ave | 34 | 14 | 8 | 12 | 44 | 44 | 0 | 50 | Qualification for the Europa League third qualifying round |
| 7 | Paços de Ferreira | 34 | 13 | 10 | 11 | 43 | 42 | +1 | 49 | |
| 8 | Estoril | 34 | 13 | 8 | 13 | 40 | 41 | −1 | 47 | |
| 9 | Belenenses | 34 | 10 | 11 | 13 | 44 | 66 | −22 | 41 | |
| 10 | Vitória de Guimarães | 34 | 9 | 13 | 12 | 45 | 53 | −8 | 40 | |
| 11 | Nacional | 34 | 10 | 8 | 16 | 40 | 56 | −16 | 38 | |
| 12 | Moreirense | 34 | 9 | 9 | 16 | 38 | 54 | −16 | 36 | |
| 13 | Marítimo | 34 | 10 | 5 | 19 | 45 | 63 | −18 | 35 | |
| 14 | Boavista | 34 | 8 | 9 | 17 | 24 | 41 | −17 | 33 | |
| 15 | Vitória de Setúbal | 34 | 6 | 12 | 16 | 40 | 61 | −21 | 30 (Note: Vitória de Setúbal ahead of Tondela on head-to-head record; Tondela–Vitória de Setúbal 1–3, Vitória de Setúbal–Tondela 0–1) | |
| 16 | Tondela | 34 | 8 | 6 | 20 | 34 | 54 | −20 | 30 | |
| 17 | União da Madeira (R) | 34 | 7 | 8 | 19 | 27 | 50 | −23 | 29 | Relegation to LigaPro |
| 18 | Académica (R) | 34 | 5 | 10 | 19 | 32 | 60 | −28 | 25 | Relegation to LigaPro |

Source: Liga Portugal, Soccerway
Rules for classification: 1) Points; 2) Head-to-head points; 3) Head-to-head goal difference; 4) Head-to-head away goals scored; 5) Goal difference; 6) Matches won; 7) Goals scored; 8) Play-off.
(Note: LPFP decided that only criteria 1, 5, 6 and 7 would be applied to establish the classification during the competition.)
(C) Champions; (R) Relegated

=== Positions by round ===
| Team ╲ Round | 1 | 2 | 3 | 4 | 5 | 6 | 7 | 8 | 9 | 10 | 11 | 12 | 13 | 14 | 15 | 16 | 17 | 18 | 19 | 20 | 21 | 22 | 23 | 24 | 25 | 26 | 27 | 28 | 29 | 30 | 31 | 32 | 33 | 34 |
|---|---|---|---|---|---|---|---|---|---|---|---|---|---|---|---|---|---|---|---|---|---|---|---|---|---|---|---|---|---|---|---|---|---|---|
| Benfica | 1 | 8 | 4 | 3 | 3 | 3 | 5 | 8 | 5 | 4 | 3 | 3 | 3 | 3 | 3 | 2 | 2 | 2 | 2 | 2 | 1 | 2 | 2 | 2 | 1 | 1 | 1 | 1 | 1 | 1 | 1 | 1 | 1 | 1 |
| Sporting CP | 5 | 6 | 2 | 2 | 2 | 2 | 2 | 1 | 1 | 1 | 1 | 1 | 1 | 2 | 1 | 1 | 1 | 1 | 1 | 1 | 2 | 1 | 1 | 1 | 2 | 2 | 2 | 2 | 2 | 2 | 2 | 2 | 2 | 2 |
| Porto | 2 | 3 | 1 | 1 | 1 | 1 | 1 | 2 | 2 | 2 | 2 | 2 | 2 | 1 | 2 | 3 | 3 | 3 | 3 | 3 | 3 | 3 | 3 | 3 | 3 | 3 | 3 | 3 | 3 | 3 | 3 | 3 | 3 | 3 |
| Braga | 4 | 9 | 5 | 6 | 4 | 4 | 4 | 4 | 4 | 3 | 4 | 4 | 4 | 4 | 4 | 4 | 4 | 4 | 4 | 4 | 4 | 4 | 4 | 4 | 4 | 4 | 4 | 4 | 4 | 4 | 4 | 4 | 4 | 4 |
| Arouca | 3 | 1 | 3 | 5 | 7 | 7 | 9 | 9 | 9 | 11 | 11 | 8 | 9 | 8 | 8 | 6 | 7 | 8 | 9 | 8 | 8 | 7 | 5 | 6 | 5 | 5 | 5 | 5 | 5 | 5 | 5 | 5 | 5 | 5 |
| Rio Ave | 9 | 4 | 7 | 11 | 6 | 6 | 3 | 3 | 3 | 5 | 5 | 6 | 5 | 7 | 7 | 7 | 6 | 7 | 7 | 7 | 7 | 8 | 6 | 5 | 6 | 6 | 6 | 6 | 6 | 6 | 6 | 7 | 8 | 6 |
| Paços de Ferreira | 7 | 7 | 8 | 4 | 8 | 10 | 7 | 5 | 7 | 9 | 6 | 7 | 6 | 6 | 6 | 5 | 5 | 5 | 5 | 5 | 6 | 6 | 8 | 8 | 9 | 7 | 8 | 8 | 7 | 7 | 7 | 6 | 6 | 7 |
| Estoril | 18 | 12 | 14 | 8 | 5 | 5 | 6 | 7 | 8 | 8 | 10 | 11 | 11 | 11 | 12 | 14 | 11 | 12 | 10 | 11 | 11 | 11 | 11 | 9 | 8 | 9 | 7 | 7 | 8 | 8 | 8 | 8 | 7 | 8 |
| Belenenses | 8 | 13 | 11 | 16 | 14 | 13 | 13 | 10 | 12 | 10 | 13 | 13 | 13 | 12 | 13 | 11 | 12 | 11 | 12 | 10 | 10 | 9 | 10 | 12 | 11 | 10 | 11 | 11 | 10 | 10 | 10 | 10 | 11 | 9 |
| Vitória de Guimarães | 17 | 15 | 16 | 13 | 13 | 15 | 15 | 14 | 11 | 13 | 12 | 9 | 10 | 9 | 9 | 9 | 8 | 6 | 6 | 6 | 5 | 5 | 7 | 7 | 7 | 8 | 9 | 9 | 11 | 11 | 11 | 11 | 9 | 10 |
| Nacional | 13 | 10 | 12 | 7 | 11 | 12 | 12 | 12 | 14 | 12 | 8 | 10 | 12 | 13 | 14 | 12 | 13 | 15 | 15 | 14 | 15 | 15 | 15 | 13 | 12 | 11 | 10 | 10 | 9 | 9 | 9 | 9 | 10 | 11 |
| Moreirense | 16 | 17 | 17 | 17 | 17 | 17 | 17 | 18 | 18 | 15 | 14 | 14 | 14 | 14 | 11 | 13 | 14 | 13 | 14 | 15 | 12 | 12 | 14 | 15 | 14 | 14 | 14 | 14 | 14 | 14 | 13 | 13 | 14 | 12 |
| Marítimo | 12 | 14 | 15 | 9 | 15 | 8 | 10 | 13 | 10 | 7 | 9 | 12 | 8 | 10 | 10 | 10 | 10 | 10 | 13 | 13 | 14 | 14 | 12 | 11 | 10 | 12 | 12 | 12 | 12 | 12 | 12 | 12 | 12 | 13 |
| Boavista | 10 | 5 | 10 | 14 | 9 | 9 | 11 | 11 | 13 | 14 | 15 | 16 | 16 | 16 | 17 | 17 | 17 | 17 | 17 | 16 | 16 | 16 | 16 | 16 | 17 | 16 | 16 | 16 | 15 | 15 | 14 | 14 | 13 | 14 |
| Vitória de Setúbal | 11 | 2 | 6 | 10 | 10 | 11 | 8 | 6 | 6 | 6 | 7 | 5 | 7 | 5 | 5 | 8 | 9 | 9 | 8 | 9 | 9 | 10 | 9 | 10 | 13 | 13 | 13 | 13 | 13 | 13 | 15 | 15 | 15 | 15 |
| Tondela | 14 | 16 | 13 | 15 | 16 | 16 | 16 | 16 | 16 | 18 | 18 | 18 | 18 | 18 | 18 | 18 | 18 | 18 | 18 | 18 | 18 | 18 | 18 | 18 | 18 | 18 | 18 | 18 | 18 | 18 | 18 | 17 | 17 | 16 |
| União da Madeira | 6 | 11 | 9 | 12 | 12 | 14 | 14 | 15 | 15 | 16 | 16 | 15 | 15 | 15 | 15 | 15 | 15 | 14 | 11 | 12 | 13 | 13 | 13 | 14 | 15 | 15 | 15 | 15 | 16 | 16 | 16 | 16 | 16 | 17 |
| Académica | 15 | 18 | 18 | 18 | 18 | 18 | 18 | 17 | 17 | 17 | 17 | 17 | 17 | 17 | 16 | 16 | 16 | 16 | 16 | 17 | 17 | 17 | 17 | 17 | 16 | 17 | 17 | 17 | 17 | 17 | 17 | 18 | 18 | 18 |

| Leader |
| Relegation to 2016–17 LigaPro |

=== Results ===
| Home \ Away | ACA | ARO | BEL | BEN | BOA | BRA | EST | MAR | MOR | NAC | PAÇ | POR | RAV | SCP | TON | UNI | VGU | VSE |
|---|---|---|---|---|---|---|---|---|---|---|---|---|---|---|---|---|---|---|
| Académica | | 1–1 | 4–3 | 1–2 | 0–2 | 0–0 | 0–3 | 1–0 | 1–1 | 2–2 | 1–1 | 1–2 | 0–2 | 1–3 | 2–1 | 3–1 | 2–0 | 0–4 |
| Arouca | 3–2 | | 2–2 | 1–0 | 3–2 | 0–0 | 1–0 | 4–1 | 1–2 | 3–0 | 2–2 | 1–3 | 0–0 | 0–1 | 1–1 | 3–0 | 2–2 | 1–0 |
| Belenenses | 1–1 | 0–2 | | 0–5 | 1–0 | 3–0 | 2–1 | 1–1 | 2–0 | 2–2 | 0–2 | 1–2 | 3–3 | 2–5 | 2–1 | 1–0 | 3–3 | 0–3 |
| Benfica | 3–0 | 3–1 | 6–0 | | 2–0 | 5–1 | 4–0 | 6–0 | 3–2 | 4–1 | 3–0 | 1–2 | 3–1 | 0–3 | 4–1 | 2–0 | 1–0 | 2–1 |
| Boavista | 0–0 | 0–0 | 1–0 | 0–1 | | 0–0 | 1–1 | 0–1 | 0–3 | 0–1 | 0–1 | 0–5 | 1–2 | 0–0 | 1–0 | 1–0 | 1–2 | 4–0 |
| Braga | 3–0 | 0–0 | 4–0 | 0–2 | 4–0 | | 2–0 | 5–1 | 1–1 | 2–1 | 1–1 | 3–1 | 5–1 | 0–4 | 3–0 | 2–0 | 3–3 | 3–2 |
| Estoril | 1–1 | 1–1 | 2–0 | 1–2 | 1–0 | 1–0 | | 2–1 | 2–0 | 1–1 | 1–0 | 1–3 | 2–2 | 1–2 | 2–1 | 2–1 | 0–1 | 3–0 |
| Marítimo | 1–0 | 1–2 | 1–2 | 0–2 | 0–3 | 1–3 | 1–1 | | 5–1 | 2–0 | 0–2 | 1–1 | 3–2 | 0–1 | 1–0 | 0–1 | 3–0 | 5–2 |
| Moreirense | 2–2 | 0–2 | 2–3 | 1–4 | 1–1 | 0–0 | 1–3 | 2–1 | | 2–0 | 2–0 | 2–2 | 0–1 | 0–1 | 1–2 | 0–0 | 3–4 | 0–2 |
| Nacional | 2–0 | 2–2 | 2–2 | 1–4 | 0–0 | 2–3 | 4–1 | 3–1 | 0–1 | | 3–0 | 1–2 | 1–0 | 0–4 | 3–1 | 1–0 | 3–2 | 1–1 |
| Paços de Ferreira | 1–0 | 1–1 | 2–2 | 1–3 | 0–1 | 1–0 | 2–0 | 2–2 | 0–0 | 3–1 | | 1–0 | 0–3 | 1–3 | 1–4 | 6–0 | 0–1 | 2–1 |
| Porto | 3–1 | 1–2 | 4–0 | 1–0 | 4–0 | 0–0 | 2–0 | 1–0 | 3–2 | 4–0 | 2–1 | | 1–1 | 1–3 | 0–1 | 3–2 | 3–0 | 2–0 |
| Rio Ave | 1–0 | 3–1 | 1–2 | 0–1 | 1–0 | 1–0 | 1–3 | 1–0 | 0–1 | 1–0 | 1–1 | 1–3 | | 1–2 | 2–3 | 1–0 | 2–0 | 2–1 |
| Sporting CP | 3–2 | 5–1 | 1–0 | 0–1 | 2–0 | 3–2 | 1–0 | 3–1 | 3–1 | 1–0 | 1–1 | 2–0 | 0–0 | | 2–2 | 2–0 | 5–1 | 5–0 |
| Tondela | 2–0 | 0–1 | 2–2 | 0–4 | 1–2 | 0–1 | 0–1 | 3–4 | 1–1 | 1–0 | 0–2 | 0–1 | 1–1 | 1–2 | | 1–0 | 1–1 | 1–3 |
| União da Madeira | 3–1 | 0–0 | 0–0 | 0–0 | 1–0 | 0–1 | 1–1 | 2–1 | 0–1 | 3–0 | 3–4 | 0–4 | 1–2 | 1–0 | 2–0 | | 0–0 | 2–2 |
| Vitória de Guimarães | 1–1 | 2–2 | 1–1 | 0–1 | 1–1 | 0–1 | 1–1 | 3–4 | 4–1 | 0–1 | 0–1 | 1–0 | 3–1 | 0–0 | 1–0 | 3–1 | | 2–2 |
| Vitória de Setúbal | 2–1 | 0–0 | 0–1 | 2–4 | 2–2 | 1–1 | 1–0 | 1–1 | 0–1 | 1–1 | 0–0 | 0–1 | 2–2 | 0–6 | 0–1 | 2–2 | 2–2 | |

Source: LPFP (in Portuguese)
Legend: Blue = home team win; Yellow = draw; Red = away team win.

== Statistics ==
=== Top goalscorers ===
As of 15 May 2016

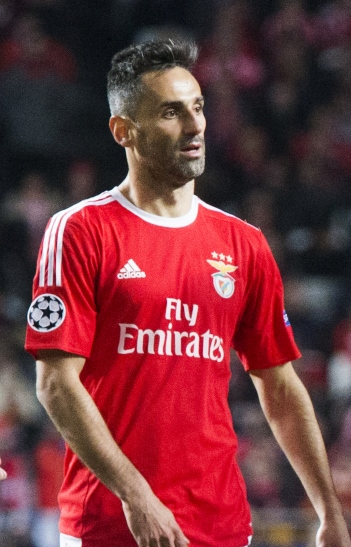
Benfica's Jonas was the top scorer with 32 goals, winning the Bola de Prata.

| Rank | Player | Club | Goals |
|---|---|---|---|
| 1 | (Brazil) Jonas | Benfica | 32 |
| 2 | (Algeria) Islam Slimani | Sporting CP | 27 |
| 3 | (Greece) Kostas Mitroglou | Benfica | 20 |
| 4 | (Brazil) Léo Bonatini | Estoril | 17 |
| 5 | (Brazil) Rafael Martins | Moreirense | 16 |
| 6 | (Portugal) Bruno Moreira | Paços de Ferreira | 14 |
| 7 | (Cameroon) Vincent Aboubakar | Porto | 13 |
| 7 | (Brazil) Nathan Júnior | Tondela | 13 |
| 9 | (Brazil) Dyego Sousa | Marítimo | 12 |
| 9 | (Brazil) Henrique Dourado | Vitória de Guimarães | 12 |
| 9 | (Portugal) Diogo Jota | Paços de Ferreira | 12 |
| 9 | (Portugal) André Claro | Vitória de Setúbal | 12 |

==== Hat-tricks ====
As of 15 May 2016

| Player | For | Against | Result | Date |
|---|---|---|---|---|
| (Algeria) Islam Slimani | Sporting CP | Vitória de Guimarães | 5–1 | 4 October 2015 |
| (Brazil) Jonas | Benfica | Nacional | 1–4 | 11 January 2016 |
| (Greece) Kostas Mitroglou | Benfica | Belenenses | 0–5 | 5 February 2016 |
| (Brazil) Léo Bonatini | Estoril | Vitória de Setubal | 3–0 | 27 February 2016 |

=== Top assists ===
As of 15 May 2016

| Rank | Player | Club | Assists |
|---|---|---|---|
| 1 | (Argentina) Nicolás Gaitán | Benfica | 15 |
| 1 | (Mexico) Miguel Layún | Porto | 15 |
| 3 | (Brazil) Jonas | Benfica | 12 |
| 4 | (Costa Rica) Bryan Ruiz | Sporting CP | 11 |
| 5 | (Portugal) Iuri Medeiros | Moreirense | 10 |
| 5 | (Portugal) João Mário | Sporting CP | 10 |
| 7 | (Portugal) Carlos Martins | Belenenses | 9 |
| 7 | (Portugal) Salvador Agra | Nacional | 9 |
| 7 | (Uruguay) Maxi Pereira | Porto | 9 |
| 10 | (Brazil) Otávio | Vitória de Guimarães | 8 |

=== Scoring ===
As of 15 May 2016

- First goal: João Mário, for Sporting CP vs Tondela (14 August 2015)
- Last goal: Salvador Agra, for Nacional vs Benfica (15 May 2016)
- Biggest home win:
  - Benfica 6–0 Belenenses (11 September 2015)
  - Paços de Ferreira 6–0 União da Madeira (12 December 2015)
  - Benfica 6–0 Marítimo (6 January 2016)
- Biggest away win:
  - Vitória de Setúbal 0–6 Sporting CP (6 January 2016)
- Highest scoring match: 7 goals
  - Marítimo 5–2 Vitória de Setúbal (13 September 2015)
  - Vitória de Guimarães 3–4 Marítimo (12 December 2015)
  - Académica 4–3 Belenenses (14 December 2015)
  - Moreirense 3–4 Vitória de Guimarães (6 January 2016)
  - Tondela 3–4 Marítimo (21 February 2016)
  - Belenenses 2–5 Sporting CP (4 April 2016)
  - União da Madeira 3–4 Paços de Ferreira (17 April 2016)
- Biggest winning margin: 6 goals
  - Benfica 6–0 Belenenses (11 September 2015)
  - Paços de Ferreira 6–0 União da Madeira (12 December 2015)
  - Benfica 6–0 Marítimo (6 January 2016)
  - Vitória de Setúbal 0–6 Sporting CP (6 January 2016)
- Most goals scored in a match by a team: 6 goals
  - Benfica 6–0 Belenenses (11 September 2015)
  - Paços de Ferreira 6–0 União da Madeira (12 December 2015)
  - Benfica 6–0 Marítimo (6 January 2016)
  - Vitória de Setúbal 0–6 Sporting CP (6 January 2016)

=== Match streaks ===
As of 15 May 2016

- Longest winning run: 12 matches
  - Benfica, from matchday 23 (20 February 2016) to matchday 34 (15 May 2016)
- Longest unbeaten run: 14 matches
  - Benfica, from matchday 9 (30 October 2015) to matchday 21 (5 February 2016)
  - Porto, from matchday 1 (15 August 2015) to matchday 14 (20 December 2015)
- Longest winless run: 15 matches
  - Vitória de Setúbal, from matchday 20 (31 January 2016) to matchday 34 (14 May 2016)
- Longest losing run: 6 matches
  - Académica, from matchday 1 (17 August 2015) to matchday 6 (28 September 2015)
  - Tondela, from matchday 9 (30 October 2015) to matchday 14 (20 December 2015)
- Most consecutive draws: 5 matches
  - Arouca, from matchday 5 (20 September 2015) to matchday 9 (1 November 2015)

=== Discipline ===
As of 15 May 2016

==== Club ====
- Most yellow cards: 113
  - Marítimo
- Most red cards: 19
  - Marítimo

==== Player ====
- Most yellow cards: 14
  - (Ghana) Alhassan Wakaso (Rio Ave)
  - (Brazil) Lucas Souza (Tondela)
- Most red cards: 3
  - (Brazil) Diego Carlos (Estoril)
  - (Portugal) Edgar Costa (Marítimo)
  - (Portugal) Rúben Ferreira (Marítimo)
  - (Portugal) Raul Silva (Marítimo)

== Awards ==
=== Monthly awards ===
==== LPFP Player of the Month ====
| Month | Player | Club |
|---|---|---|
| August/September | (Portugal) André André | Porto |
| October/November | (Portugal) André André | Porto |
| December | (Algeria) Islam Slimani | Sporting CP |
| January | (Brazil) Jonas | Benfica |
| February | (Brazil) Jonas | Benfica |
| March | (Brazil) Jonas | Benfica |
| April | (Portugal) João Mário | Sporting CP |

==== SJPF Young Player of the Month ====
| Month | Player | Club |
|---|---|---|
| August/September | (Portugal) Danilo Pereira | Porto |
| October/November | (Portugal) Diogo Jota | Paços de Ferreira |
| December | (Portugal) Renato Sanches | Benfica |
| January | (Portugal) João Mário | Sporting CP |
| February | (Portugal) João Mário | Sporting CP |
| March | (Portugal) Diogo Jota | Paços de Ferreira |
| April | (Portugal) João Mário | Sporting CP |

==== Goal of the month ====
| Month | Scorer | For | Against | Stadium | Date |
|---|---|---|---|---|---|
| August/September | Suk Hyun-jun (KOR) | Vitória de Setúbal | Académica | Estádio Cidade de Coimbra | 24 August 2015 |
| October/November | Yacine Brahimi (ALG) | Porto | Tondela | Estádio Municipal de Aveiro | 28 November 2015 |
| December | Renato Sanches (POR) | Benfica | Académica | Estádio da Luz | 4 December 2015 |
| January | Hugo Seco (POR) | Académica | Tondela | Estádio Cidade de Coimbra | 10 January 2016 |
| February | Diogo Jota (POR) | Paços de Ferreira | Benfica | Estádio Capital do Móvel | 20 February 2016 |
| March | Miguel Rosa (POR) | Belenenses | Braga | Estádio do Restelo | 13 March 2016 |
| April | Edgar Costa (POR) | Marítimo | Nacional | Estádio dos Barreiros | 2 April 2016 |

==== Team of the Year ====

SJPF Primeira Liga Team of the Year 2016

Team of the Year
| Goalkeeper | (Brazil) Ederson (Benfica) | | | |
| Defenders | (Portugal) Nélson Semedo (Benfica) | (Sweden) Victor Lindelöf (Benfica) | (Uruguay) Sebastián Coates (Sporting CP) | (Brazil) Alex Telles (Porto) |
| Midfielders | (Portugal) Danilo Pereira (Porto) | | (Portugal) Adrien Silva (Sporting CP) | (Portugal) Pizzi (Benfica) |
| Forwards | (Portugal) Gelson Martins (Sporting CP) | | (Brazil) Jonas (Benfica) | (Greece) Kostas Mitroglou (Benfica) |

== Attendances ==
| Pos | Team | Total | High | Low | Average | Change |
|---|---|---|---|---|---|---|
| 1 | Benfica | 855,474 | 64,235 | 31,590 | 50,322 | +18.2% |
| 2 | Sporting CP | 679,790 | 49,699 | 30,057 | 39,988 | +24.0% |
| 3 | Porto | 549,512 | 49,209 | 16,297 | 32,324 | +8.2% |
| 4 | Vitória de Guimarães | 211,182 | 22,218 | 8,975 | 12,422 | −15.9% |
| 5 | Braga | 189,862 | 19,428 | 4,169 | 11,168 | +10.1% |
| 6 | Marítimo | 104,474 | 9,400 | 4,250 | 6,146 | +36.2% |
| 7 | Boavista | 103,263 | 22,834 | 3,653 | 6,074 | +42.3% |
| 8 | Académica | 91,012 | 26,444 | 2,170 | 5,354 | +14.7% |
| 9 | Belenenses | 75,833 | 13,109 | 1,183 | 4,461 | +46.8% |
| 10 | Vitória de Setúbal | 75,406 | 10,998 | 1,900 | 4,436 | +40.7% |
| 11 | Tondela | 56,499 | 22,003 | 909 | 3,323 | +336.7%^{1,3} |
| 12 | Rio Ave | 56,125 | 9,023 | 1,615 | 3,301 | +16.7% |
| 13 | Estoril | 50,008 | 7,836 | 827 | 2,942 | +53.4% |
| 14 | Arouca | 49,006 | 23,540 | 705 | 2,883 | +82.2%^{2} |
| 15 | Paços de Ferreira | 47,625 | 6,433 | 1,208 | 2,801 | −4.7% |
| 16 | Nacional | 42,327 | 4,753 | 1,318 | 2,490 | +20.9% |
| 17 | União da Madeira | 38,292 | 5,095 | 1,077 | 2,252 | +98.1%^{1,4} |
| 18 | Moreirense | 38,161 | 5,772 | 757 | 2,245 | +10.7% |
| | League total | 3,313,851 | 64,235 | 705 | 10,830 | +7.2% |

Source: LPFP
Notes:
1. Team played last season in the Segunda Liga.
2. Arouca played one match at Estádio Municipal de Aveiro, with an attendance of 23,540 (Benfica) spectators.
3. Tondela played three matches at Estádio Municipal de Aveiro, with attendances of 22,003 (Sporting CP), 9,394 (Benfica) and 3,449 (Porto) spectators.
4. União da Madeira played five matches at Estádio da Madeira, with attendances of 1,408 (Vitória de Guimarães), 1,420 (Braga), 2,277 (Porto), 5,095 (Benfica) and 3,594 (Sporting CP) spectators.
