= Lucas Piasentin =

Brazilian footballer

Personal information
- Date of birth: 17 March 1986 (age 40)
- Place of birth: Londrina, Brazil
- Height: 1.93 m (6 ft 4 in)
- Position: Centre-back

Team information
- Current team: Windsor Arch Ka I
- Number: 6

Youth career
- 1998–2002: PSTC
- 2003–2006: Atlético Paranaense

Senior career*
Years	Team	Apps	(Gls)
2007–2008	Atlético Paranaense	0	(0)
2007	→ Rio Branco (loan)	0	(0)
2008	→ Fortaleza (loan)	0	(0)
2008	Horizonte	0	(0)
2009	Portuguesa Londrinense	0	(0)
2011	Rio Branco	0	(0)
2011	PSTC	0	(0)
2012	Angra dos Reis	0	(0)
2012–2013	União da Madeira	33	(3)
2013–2016	Čukarički	84	(7)
2017–2018	Espírito Santo	5	(0)
2018	Atlético Itapemirim		
2019–	Windsor Arch Ka I		
- * Club domestic league appearances and goals as of 1 January 2020

Lucas Piasentin (born 17 March 1986) is a Brazilian professional footballer who plays as a centre-back for Associação Desportiva Ka I.

== Career ==
Born in Londrina, Lucas Piasentin made his first football steps at Paraná Soccer Technical Center (PSTC), before joining the youth system of Atlético Paranaense. He made his debut for the first team during the 2007 Campeonato Paranaense, before spending some time on loan with Rio Branco and Fortaleza. In the following years, Lucas Piasentin played with Horizonte, making his Campeonato Brasileiro Série C debut (2008), as well as with Portuguesa Londrinense, PSTC and Angra dos Reis in the lower state leagues (between 2009 and 2012).

In the summer of 2012, Lucas Piasentin signed a contract with Portuguese club União da Madeira. He scored three goals in 33 appearances in the 2012–13 Segunda Liga season.

In June 2013, Lucas Piasentin moved to Serbia and signed with SuperLiga newcomers Čukarički. He was a member of the team that won the 2014–15 Serbian Cup, the first major trophy in the club's history.

After playing in Serbia until early 2017, he moved back to Brazil at start of the year, and played with Espírito Santo in Campeonato Brasileiro Série D in 2018 and next with Atlético Itapemirim. At the beginning of 2019 he joined Windsor Arch Ka I jogando na Liga de Elite de Macau.

== Honours ==
Fortaleza

- Campeonato Cearense: 2008

Čukarički

- Serbian Cup: 2014–15
