= Borivoje Ristić =

Serbian footballer

Personal information
- Date of birth: 19 September 1983 (age 43)
- Place of birth: Leskovac, SFR Yugoslavia
- Height: 1.88 m (6 ft 2 in)
- Position: Goalkeeper

Youth career
- Partizan

Senior career*
Years	Team	Apps	(Gls)
2001–2002	Smederevo	0	(0)
2002–2003	Dubočica	9	(0)
2003–2004	Mačva Šabac	30	(0)
2004–2006	Vojvodina	1	(0)
2006	MŠK Rimavská Sobota	0	(0)
2006–2007	Dubočica	0	(0)
2007–2008	Metalac Gornji Milanovac	33	(0)
2008–2009	Sevojno	16	(0)
2009–2010	Teleoptik	32	(0)
2010–2011	BASK	32	(0)
2011	Novi Pazar	3	(0)
2012–2015	Čukarički	81	(0)
2015–2016	Radnik Surdulica	26	(0)
2016–2017	Rudar Velenje	8	(0)
2017–2018	Panserraikos	34	(0)
2018–2019	Radnički Niš	31	(0)
2019	Larissa	0	(0)
2020–2021	Radnički Niš	27	(0)
2021	Xewkija Tigers		
2021–2024	Radnički Beograd		
- * Club domestic league appearances and goals as of 12 December 2020

Borivoje Ristić (Serbian Cyrillic: Боривоје Ристић; born 19 September 1983) is a Serbian retired footballer who played as a goalkeeper. He is the current goalkeeping coach of the Philippines women's national football team.

== Honours ==
BASK

- Serbian First League (1): 2010–11

Čukarički

- Serbian Cup (1): 2014–15
