= Milan Ilić (politician) =

Serbian politician

Milan Ilić (Serbian Cyrillic: Милан Илић; born 23 March 1990) is a Serbian politician. He was elected to the National Assembly of Serbia in the 2020 parliamentary election as a member of the Serbian Progressive Party.

== Private career ==
Ilić was born in Vranje, in what was then the Socialist Republic of Serbia in the Socialist Federal Republic of Yugoslavia. He still lives in the city and was an economics student at the time of the 2020 election.

== Politician ==
Ilič sought election to the Vranje municipal assembly in the 2012 Serbian local elections as a candidate of the far-right Serbian Radical Party, appearing in the twenty-sixth position on that party's electoral list. The list did not win any mandates. He subsequently left the Radicals and joined the Progressive Party. Ilić is a member of the Progressive Party's city board in Vranje and has served in the party's Academy of Young Leaders program.

=== Parliamentarian ===
Ilić was given the eighteenth position on the Progressive Party's Aleksandar Vučić — For Our Children list in the 2020 Serbian parliamentary election. This was tantamount to election, and he was indeed elected when the list won a landslide majority with 188 mandates. He is a member of the committee on the diaspora and Serbs in the region; a deputy member of the European integration committee and the committee on labour, social issues, social inclusion, and poverty reduction; a deputy member of Serbia's delegation to the Parliamentary Assembly of the Mediterranean; the leader of Serbia's parliamentary friendship group with Grenada; and a member of Serbia's parliamentary friendship groups with Armenia, the Czech Republic, France, Greece, Hungary, Israel, Russia, Slovakia, and the United Arab Emirates.
