= Ivan Todorović (footballer) =

Serbian footballer

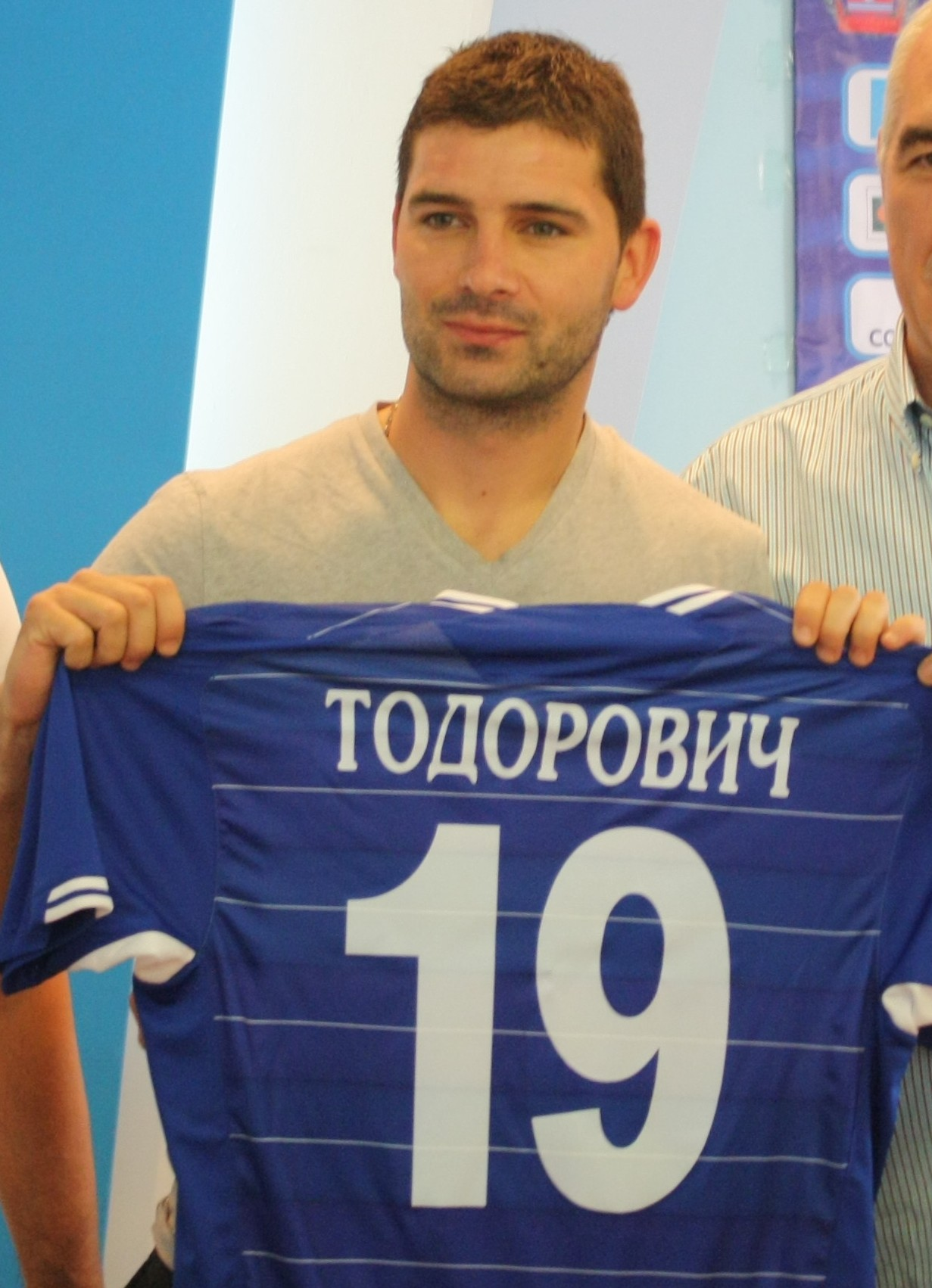
- Todorović in 2012

Personal information
- Full name: Ivan Todorović
- Date of birth: 29 July 1983 (age 43)
- Place of birth: Belgrade, SFR Yugoslavia
- Height: 1.83 m (6 ft 0 in)
- Position: Midfielder

Youth career
- Partizan

Senior career*
Years	Team	Apps	(Gls)
2001–2004	Hajduk Beograd	54	(3)
2004–2006	Zeta	51	(3)
2006–2009	KAMAZ	112	(8)
2010–2012	Nacional	40	(0)
2012–2013	Rotor Volgograd	27	(1)
2013–2015	Čukarički	53	(6)
2015	Novi Pazar	10	(0)
2016	Borac Čačak	3	(0)

International career
2005–2006	Serbia and Montenegro U21 (Note: Only official UEFA matches included)	11	(0)
- * Club domestic league appearances and goals as of 13 July 2017

Ivan Todorović (Serbian Cyrillic: Иван Тодоровић; born 29 July 1983) is a Serbian retired footballer who played as a central midfielder.

Todorović represented Serbia and Montenegro at the 2006 UEFA Under-21 Championship.

== Honours ==
Čukarički

- Serbian Cup: 2014–15
