= Zlatoje Pavlović =

Serbian footballer and referee

Personal information
- Full name: Zlatoje Pavlović
- Date of birth: 22 May 1995 (age 31)
- Place of birth: Kraljevo, FR Yugoslavia
- Height: 1.84 m (6 ft 0 in)
- Position: Defender

Youth career
- Sloga Kraljevo

Senior career*
Years	Team	Apps	(Gls)
2014–2019	Sloga Kraljevo	50	(0)
2017	→ Prva Petoletka	9	(0)
2019–2020	Polet Ratina		
2020	Morava Mrsać		
- * Club domestic league appearances and goals as of 5 May 2018

Zlatoje Pavlović (Serbian Cyrillic: Златоје Павловић; born 22 May 1995) is a Serbian footballer, and assistant referee.

== Career ==
=== Sloga Kraljevo ===
Born in Kraljevo, Pavlović passed youth categories of local club Sloga. He joined the first team in 2014. He started 2014–15 season, as a midfielder in the first squad, but later, after some players joined club, Pavlović moved on the bench. He made 10 Serbian First League and 1 cup appearance for the season, changing several position on the field. Pavlović also started 2015–16 Serbian League West season on the right-back position, but he was replaced in two future matches against Zvižd Kučevo, and later moved on the bench, noting some other matches until the end of first half-season. After Sloga relegated to the Morava Zone League, Pavlović started 2016–17 season as a team captain. At the beginning of 2017, Pavlović moved decided to join Prva Petoletka, after which he moved to the club for the rest of a season. In summer same year, he returned to his home club, Sloga Kraljevo.

== Career statistics ==
As of 5 May 2018

Appearances and goals by club, season and competition
Club	Season	League			Cup		Continental		Other		Total	
Club	Season	Division	Apps	Goals	Apps	Goals	Apps	Goals	Apps	Goals	Apps	Goals
Sloga Kraljevo	2013–14	Serbian First League	0	0	0	0	—		—		0	0
Sloga Kraljevo	2014–15	Serbian First League	10	0	1	0	—		—		11	0
Sloga Kraljevo	2015–16	Serbian League West	5	0	0	0	—		—		5	0
Sloga Kraljevo	2016–17	Morava Zone League	14	0	—		—		1 (Note: Appearance in FSO Kraljevo Cup against Radnički Kovači)	0	15	0
Prva Petoletka	2016–17	Serbian League East	9	0	—		—		1 (Note: Including appearance in final cup match under OFS Trstenik against Poljoprivrednik)	1	10	1
Sloga Kraljevo	2017–18	Morava Zone League	21	0	—		—		—		21	0
Sloga Kraljevo	Total		50	0	1	0	—		1	0	52	1
Career total			59	0	1	0	—		2	1	62	1
