= Aleksandar Ivanović =

Serbian footballer

Personal information
- Full name: Aleksandar Ivanović
- Date of birth: 20 November 1988 (age 37)
- Place of birth: Gornji Milanovac, SFR Yugoslavia
- Height: 1.84 m (6 ft 1/2 in)
- Position: Midfielder

Team information
- Current team: Metalac GM (youth coach)

Youth career
- Metalac GM

Senior career*
| Years | Team | Apps | (Gls) |
| 2005–2019 | Metalac GM | 174 | (9) |
| 2011–2012 | → Bregalnica Štip (loan) | 27 | (3) |
| 2019–2020 | Takovo | | |

Managerial career
- 2019–: Metalac GM (youth coach)
- * Club domestic league appearances and goals

Aleksandar Ivanović (Serbian Cyrillic: Александар Ивановић; born 20 November 1988) is a retired Serbian football midfielder and current youth coach at Metalac Gornji Milanovac.

== Club career ==
=== Metalac Gornji Milanovac ===
He started playing football at the age of 9 in Metalac Gornji Milanovac. He made his debut for first team at the age of 17. Also, he was loaned to Bregalnica Štip for one season. He was nominated as a player with strongest shot in team.

In mid-January 2019, Metalac announced that Ivanović from now on would play for amateur club Takovo and also being a youth coach at Metalac at the same time.
