= Rajko Brežančić =

Serbian footballer

Personal information
- Date of birth: 21 August 1989 (age 37)
- Place of birth: Vlasenica, SFR Yugoslavia
- Height: 1.76 m (5 ft 9 in)
- Position: Left-back

Youth career
- Radnički Nova Pazova
- 2002–2007: Partizan

Senior career*
Years	Team	Apps	(Gls)
2007–2010	Partizan	10	(0)
2007–2008	→ Teleoptik (loan)	15	(0)
2008	→ Bežanija (loan)	13	(0)
2010	→ Teleoptik (loan)	9	(0)
2010–2011	Metalac Gornji Milanovac	7	(0)
2011	→ Bežanija (loan)	13	(0)
2011–2013	Bežanija	58	(2)
2013–2015	Čukarički	61	(2)
2015–2016	AZ	8	(1)
2016–2019	Huesca	55	(0)
2019	Málaga	0	(0)
2019–2022	Partizan	16	(1)
2022–2023	Radnički Beograd	17	(0)

International career
2005–2006	Serbia and Montenegro U17 (Note: Official UEFA matches only)	7	(0)
2007	Serbia U19	2	(0)
2009	Serbia U20	1	(0)
2009–2010	Serbia U21	3	(0)
- * Club domestic league appearances and goals

Rajko Brežančić (Serbian Cyrillic: Рајко Брежанчић; born 21 August 1989) is a Serbian former professional footballer who played as a left-back.

== Club career ==
After coming through the youth system at Partizan, Brežančić signed his first professional contract with the club on 1 June 2007, penning a five-year deal. He subsequently went on loan to Teleoptik and Bežanija in order to get experience. In January 2009, Brežančić returned to Partizan and made seven league appearances until the end of the 2008–09 season, as the club won the title. He recorded three more during the first part of the 2009–10 season, before moving on loan to Teleoptik again in January 2010.

In the summer of 2010, Brežančić signed with Serbian SuperLiga club Metalac Gornji Milanovac. He would be loaned to Serbian First League side Bežanija in the 2011 winter transfer window. Six months later, Brežančić signed a permanent contract with Bežanija and stayed there for the next two seasons.

In the summer of 2013, Brežančić was transferred to newly promoted SuperLiga club Čukarički. He made 29 league appearances and scored once in the 2013–14 campaign. In the following season, Brežančić again missed only one out of 30 league games and scored one goal, as Čukarički finished in third place. He also helped the team win the 2014–15 Serbian Cup.

On 4 August 2015, Brežančić signed a three-year contract with Dutch club AZ. He made his official debut for the team in a 3–1 away league win over De Graafschap on 12 September 2015, scoring the opener early in the game.

In August 2016, Brežančić was transferred to Spain and joined Segunda División club Huesca. He contributed with 30 appearances during the 2017–18 season, as the club gained promotion to the top flight for the first time ever. On 11 November 2018, Brežančić made his La Liga debut in a 2–1 away loss to Alavés, replacing injured Pablo Insua.

On 31 January 2019, Brežančić terminated his contract with Huesca and signed an 18-month deal with Málaga.

On 21 June 2019, Brežančić signed a three-year contract with Partizan, returning to the club after nine years. He made 16 appearances across all competitions in his first season back at the club, scoring a goal in a 2–2 away league draw against Napredak Kruševac. After the appointment of Aleksandar Stanojević as manager in September 2020, Brežančić appeared in only two official matches over his last two seasons.

== International career ==
Brežančić represented Serbia and Montenegro at the 2006 UEFA Under-17 Championship. He also played for Serbia U19 in the team's unsuccessful qualifying campaign for the 2008 UEFA European Under-19 Championship. In early 2009, Brežančić participated with the under-20 team at the Qatar International Friendship Tournament.

Brežančić made his debut for the Serbia national under-21 team in a 4–1 friendly win over the Macedonia U21s on 7 June 2009. He was subsequently a member of the team at the 2009 UEFA Under-21 Championship, but failed to make any appearance at the tournament. Brežančić gained his second cap for the under-21 side in a 1–0 home friendly win over Israel U21 on 11 August 2009. His third and last appearance for the team came in another friendly, a 1–3 loss away to Romania U21 on 26 May 2010.

== Career statistics ==
As of 4 October 2022

Appearances and goals by club, season and competition
Club	Season	League			Cup		Continental		Other		Total	
Club	Season	Division	Apps	Goals	Apps	Goals	Apps	Goals	Apps	Goals	Apps	Goals
Partizan	2007–08	Serbian SuperLiga	0	0	0	0	0	0	—		0	0
Partizan	2008–09	Serbian SuperLiga	7	0	1	0	0	0	—		8	0
Partizan	2009–10	Serbian SuperLiga	3	0	2	0	2	0	—		7	0
Partizan	Total		10	0	3	0	2	0	—		15	0
Teleoptik (loan)	2007–08	Serbian League Belgrade	15	0	1	0	—		—		16	0
Bežanija (loan)	2008–09	Serbian First League	13	0	1	0	—		—		14	0
Teleoptik (loan)	2009–10	Serbian First League	9	0	0	0	—		—		9	0
Metalac Gornji Milanovac	2010–11	Serbian SuperLiga	7	0			—		—		7	0
Bežanija (loan)	2010–11	Serbian First League	13	0	0	0	—		—		13	0
Bežanija	2011–12	Serbian First League	30	2	0	0	—		—		30	2
Bežanija	2012–13	Serbian First League	28	0	1	0	—		—		29	0
Bežanija	Total		58	2	1	0	—		—		59	2
Čukarički	2013–14	Serbian SuperLiga	29	1	1	0	—		—		30	1
Čukarički	2014–15	Serbian SuperLiga	29	1	4	0	4	0	—		37	1
Čukarički	2015–16	Serbian SuperLiga	3	0	0	0	4	0	—		7	0
Čukarički	Total		61	2	5	0	8	0	—		74	2
AZ	2015–16	Eredivisie	8	1	2	0	2	0	—		12	1
Huesca	2016–17	Segunda División	24	0	2	0	—		2 (Note: Appearances in promotion and relegation playoffs)	0	28	0
Huesca	2017–18	Segunda División	30	0	0	0	—		—		30	0
Huesca	2018–19	La Liga	1	0	2	0	—		—		3	0
Huesca	Total		55	0	4	0	—		2	0	61	0
Málaga	2018–19	Segunda División	0	0	0	0	—		0	0	0	0
Partizan	2019–20	Serbian SuperLiga	12	1	1	0	3	0	—		16	1
Partizan	2020–21	Serbian SuperLiga	4	0	0	0	0	0	—		4	0
Partizan	2021–22	Serbian SuperLiga	0	0	0	0	0	0	—		0	0
Partizan	Total		16	1	1	0	3	0	—		20	1
Career total			265	6	18	0	15	0	2	0	300	6

== Honours ==
Partizan

- Serbian SuperLiga: 2008–09
- Serbian Cup: 2008–09

Čukarički

- Serbian Cup: 2014–15

Individual

- Serbian SuperLiga Team of the Season: 2014–15
