= Slavoljub Srnić =

Serbian footballer

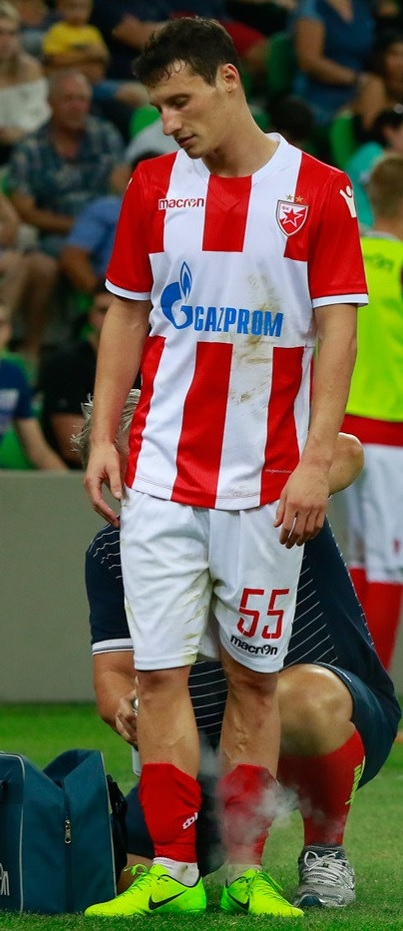
- Srnić with Red Star Belgrade in 2017

Personal information
- Full name: Slavoljub Srnić
- Date of birth: 12 January 1992 (age 34)
- Place of birth: Šabac, SFR Yugoslavia
- Height: 1.74 m (5 ft 9 in)
- Position: Central midfielder

Team information
- Current team: RFK Grafičar
- Number: 14

Youth career
- Mačva Šabac
- Red Star Belgrade

Senior career*
Years	Team	Apps	(Gls)
2010–2013	Red Star Belgrade	1	(0)
2011–2012	→ Sopot (loan)	28	(8)
2012–2015	Čukarički	94	(20)
2015–2019	Red Star Belgrade	86	(15)
2019–2020	Las Palmas	34	(1)
2021–2023	Red Star Belgrade	56	(1)
2023–2024	AEL Limassol	36	(1)
2024	Al Dhafra	0	(0)
2025	Čukarički	9	(0)
2026–	RFK Grafičar	6	(0)

International career^{‡}
2014–2015	Serbia U21	5	(2)
- * Club domestic league appearances and goals as of 14 May 2026 ‡ National team caps and goals as of 10 October 2014

Slavoljub Srnić (Serbian Cyrillic: Славољуб Срнић; born 12 January 1992) is a Serbian professional footballer who plays as a central midfielder for RFK Grafičar. He is the twin brother of Dragoljub Srnić.

== Club career ==
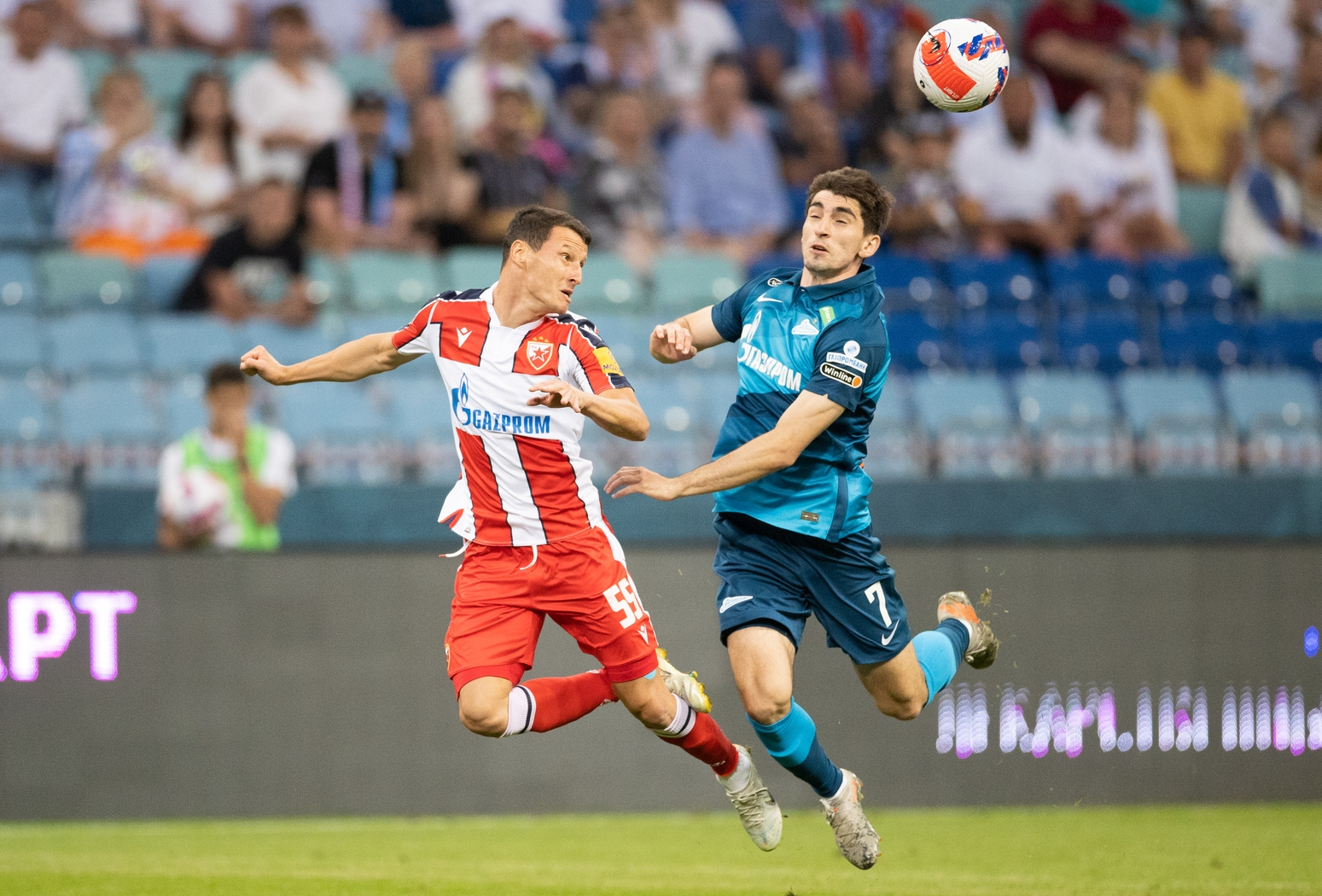
Srnić in action for Red Star Belgrade in 2022 against Zenit Saint Petersburg

=== Red Star Belgrade ===
Srnić was molded in Red Star's youth system, and some observers in Serbian football had referred to young Slavoljub as "Ognjen Koroman's student". Coach Aleksandar Kristić selected Srnić to make his professional debut for Red Star Belgrade on 6 November 2010 in a SuperLiga match against OFK Beograd. The Srnić brothers were then loaned to Red Star's farm team, FK Sopot. Subsequently, Slavoljub and Dragoljub were loaned to Čukarički, where they enjoyed much more playing time and success.

=== Čukarički ===
During the loan spell at Čukarički from Red Star, Slavoljub was named by Mozzart Sport as the most valuable player of the Serbian First League. After the loan expired, Slavoljub and his brother refused to return to Red Star Belgrade, and after many problems, they were sold to Čukarički in June 2013.

In part due to Srnić's contributions, Čukarički returned to the Serbian top flight for the 2013–14 season, when Srnić terminated his contract with Red Star due to unpaid salary and became a permanent Čukarički player. On 6 October 2013, in a match between Čukarički and Srnić's former club Red Star, Srnić made an assist 17 seconds into the game and scored a goal in the second half. Not by coincidence, Srnić earned the first international call-up in his career the following day.

=== Return to Red Star Belgrade ===
On 31 August 2015, Slavoljub returned to Red Star, signing a three-year contract. Red Star's coach Miodrag Božović had insisted on Srnić's return throughout the summer. Including his first period with the club, Srnić noted his 100 match for Red Star Belgrade in a match against Vojvodina on 7 March 2018.

=== Las Palmas ===
On 29 January 2019, Srnić moved abroad for the first time in his career after agreeing to a two-and-a-half-year contract with Segunda División side UD Las Palmas. On 5 October of the following year, he terminated his contract with the club.

=== Return to Red Star Belgrade ===
After his spell at Las Palmas, he returned to Red Star where he remained until August 2023.

=== AEL Limassol ===
On 22 August 2023, Srnic signed a two-year contract with AEL Limassol.

== International career ==
Srnić was called up by coach Radovan Ćurčić to replace an injured Lazar Marković by Serbia U21 on 7 October 2013 for the 2015 UEFA European U21 Championship qualifying campaign, but did not make his debut in the games he was called up for. He finally made his debut on 9 September 2014, in a 4–1 win against Northern Ireland U21, scoring two goals.

== Career statistics ==
As of end of 2023–24 season

Appearances and goals by club, season and competition
Club	Season	League			Cup		Continental		Other		Total	
Club	Season	Division	Apps	Goals	Apps	Goals	Apps	Goals	Apps	Goals	Apps	Goals
Red Star Belgrade	2010–11	Serbian SuperLiga	1	0	1	0	0	0	—		2	0
Sopot (loan)	2011–12	Serbian League Belgrade	28	8	—		—		—		28	8
Čukarički (loan)	2012–13	Serbian First League	31	8	2	0	—		—		33	8
Čukarički	2013–14	Serbian SuperLiga	28	3	2	0	—		—		30	3
Čukarički	2014–15	Serbian SuperLiga	29	8	6	2	4	1	—		39	11
Čukarički	2015–16	Serbian SuperLiga	6	1	0	0	4	0	—		10	1
Čukarički	Total		94	20	10	2	8	1	—		112	23
Red Star Belgrade	2015–16	Serbian SuperLiga	27	8	1	0	0	0	—		28	8
Red Star Belgrade	2016–17	Serbian SuperLiga	22	2	5	1	6	0	—		33	3
Red Star Belgrade	2017–18	Serbian SuperLiga	28	4	3	1	15	4	—		46	9
Red Star Belgrade	2018–19	Serbian SuperLiga	9	1	2	0	5	0	—		16	1
Red Star Belgrade	Total		86	15	11	2	26	4	—		123	21
Las Palmas	2018–19	Segunda División	7	1	0	0	—		—		7	1
Las Palmas	2019–20	Segunda División	27	0	2	0	—		—		29	1
Las Palmas	Total		34	1	2	0	—		—		36	1
Red Star Belgrade	2020–21	Serbian SuperLiga	17	0	3	0	1	0	—		21	0
Red Star Belgrade	2021–22	Serbian SuperLiga	24	1	5	0	8	0	—		37	1
Red Star Belgrade	2022–23	Serbian SuperLiga	15	0	2	0	9	0	—		21	0
Red Star Belgrade	Total		56	1	10	0	18	0	—		83	1
AEL Limassol	2023–24	Cypriot First Division	36	1	1	0	0	0	—		37	1
Career total			335	46	34	4	52	5	—		422	55

== Honours ==
Čukarički

- Serbian Cup: 2014–15

Red Star Belgrade

- Serbian SuperLiga: 2015–16, 2017–18, 2018–19, 2020–21, 2021–22, 2022–23
- Serbian Cup: 2020–21, 2021–22, 2022–23
