= Milan Ilić (footballer, born 1987) =

Serbian footballer

Personal information
- Full name: Milan Ilić
- Date of birth: 12 May 1987 (age 39)
- Place of birth: Kragujevac, SFR Yugoslavia
- Height: 1.92 m (6 ft 4 in)
- Position: Centre-back

Team information
- Current team: Sloga Kraljevo

Senior career*
Years	Team	Apps	(Gls)
2004–2006	Radnički Kragujevac	32	(2)
2006–2009	OFK Beograd	9	(1)
2006–2007	→ Dinamo Vranje (loan)	30	(0)
2008	→ Javor Ivanjica (loan)	6	(0)
2008–2009	→ Dinamo Vranje (loan)	17	(0)
2009–2010	Radnički Obrenovac	16	(2)
2010–2012	Santa Clara	41	(2)
2012	Čelik Nikšić	6	(1)
2013–2014	Metalurh Zaporizhya	1	(0)
2014–2015	Inđija	23	(4)
2016–2019	Radnički Kragujevac		
2019	Krško	12	(1)
2019–2020	Zlatibor Čajetina	26	(1)
2020	Kolubara	7	(0)
2021-	Sloga Kraljevo		
- * Club domestic league appearances and goals as of 19:54, 7 February 2021 (UTC)

Milan Ilić (Serbian Cyrillic: Милан Илић; born 12 May 1987) is a Serbian footballer, who plays as a centre back.

== Honours ==
Radnički Kragujevac

- Serbian League West: 2016–17
