= Centro Desportivo da Madeira =

Football ground in Ribeira Brava, Madeira, Portugal

Coordinates: 32.6911234°N 17.0504012°W

- Estádio da Ribeira Brava
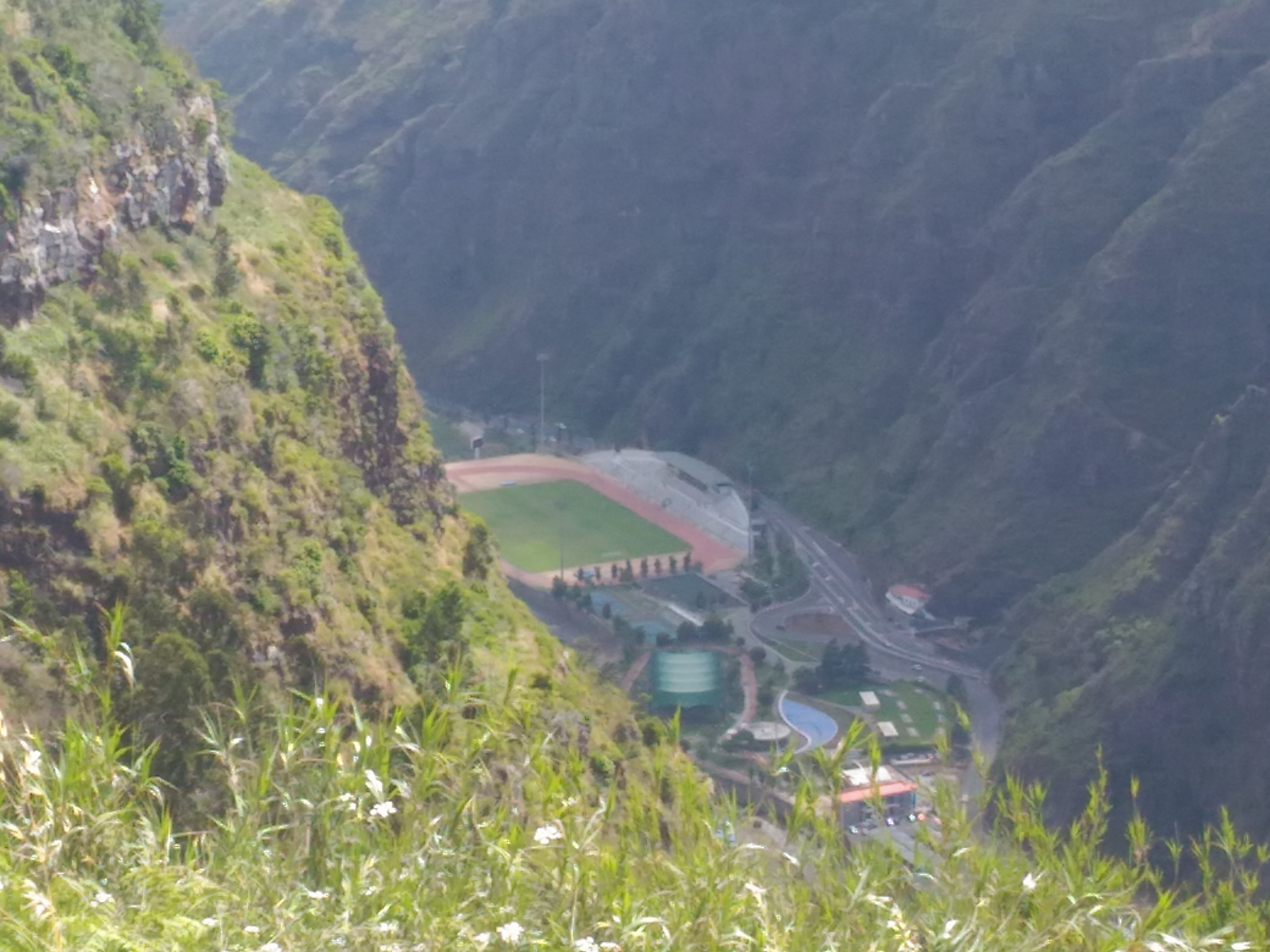
- Interactive map of Centro Desportivo da Madeira
- Location: Sítio da Fajã da Ribeira; 9350 Ribeira Brava; Madeira, Portugal
- Owner: Região Autónoma da Madeira
- Operator: Sociedade de Desenvolvimento Ponta do Oeste
- Capacity: 2,500
- Surface: Grass
- Field size: 105 x 68 metres

Construction
- Built: 2007
- Opened: 7 September 2007
- Cost: €7,7 million

Tenant
- União (2014–2019)

Centro Desportivo da Madeira is a multi-use stadium in Ribeira Brava, Madeira, Portugal. It is used mostly for football matches. The stadium is able to hold 2,500 people and was built in 2007.

== Gallery ==
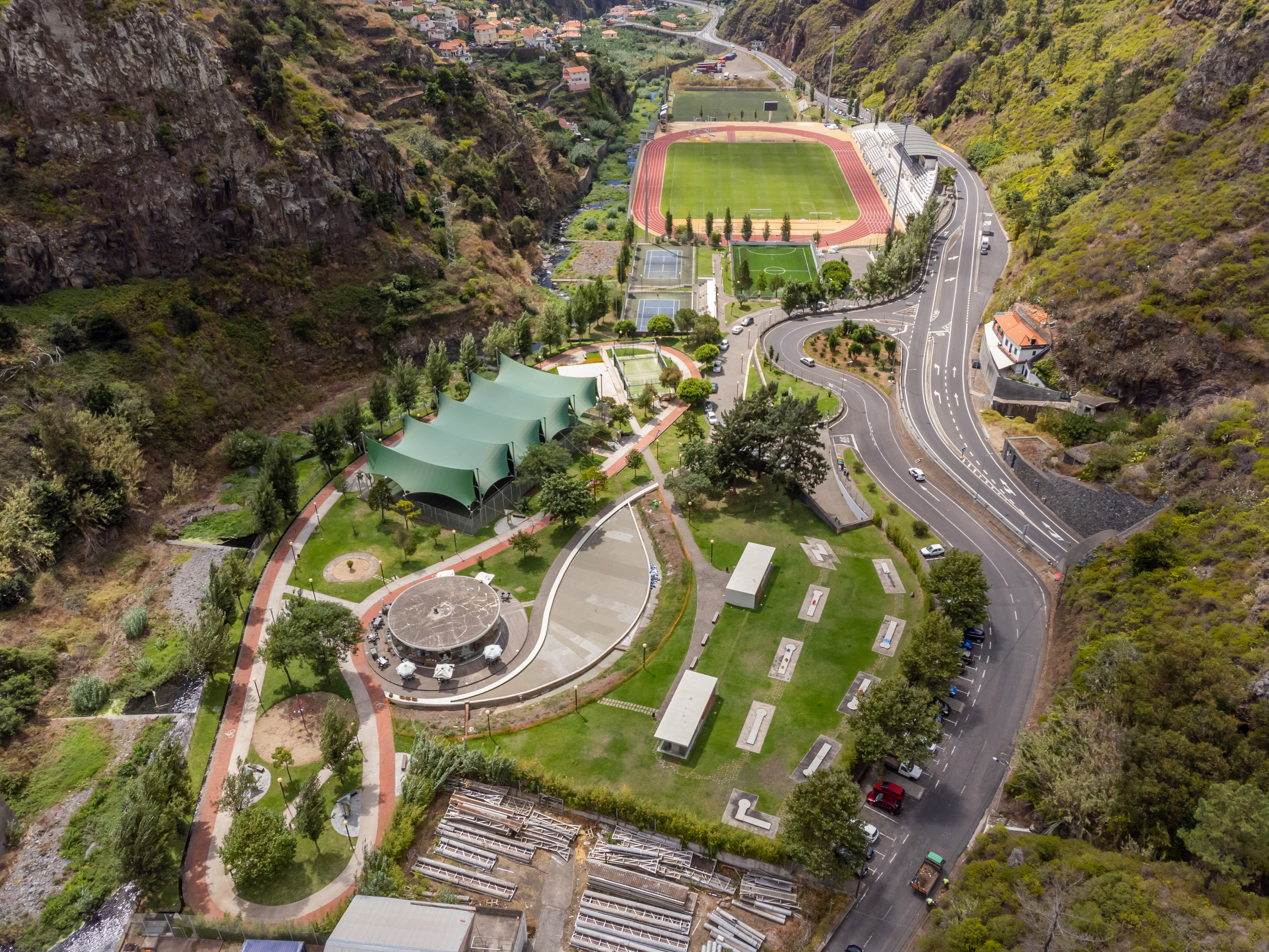

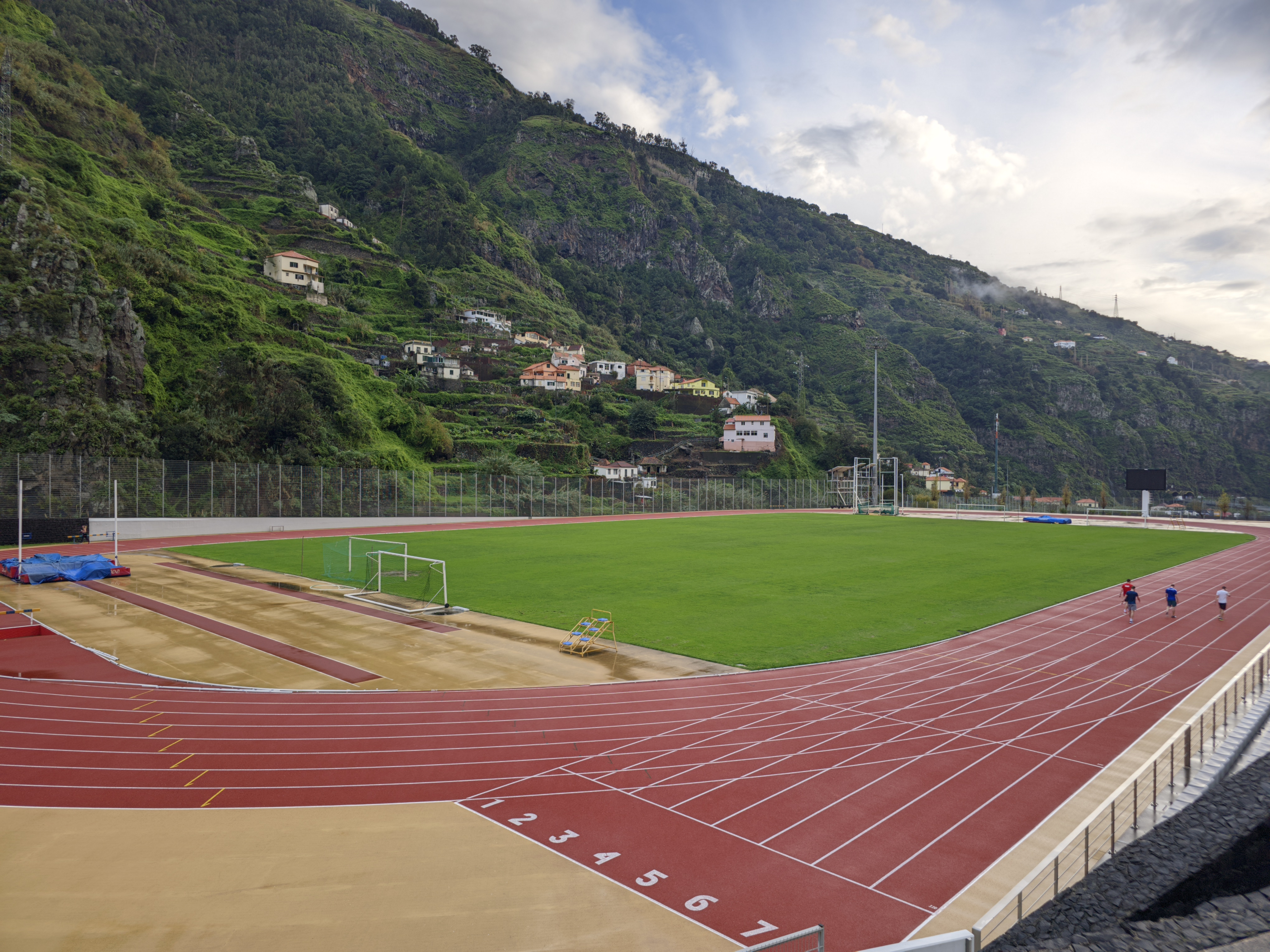

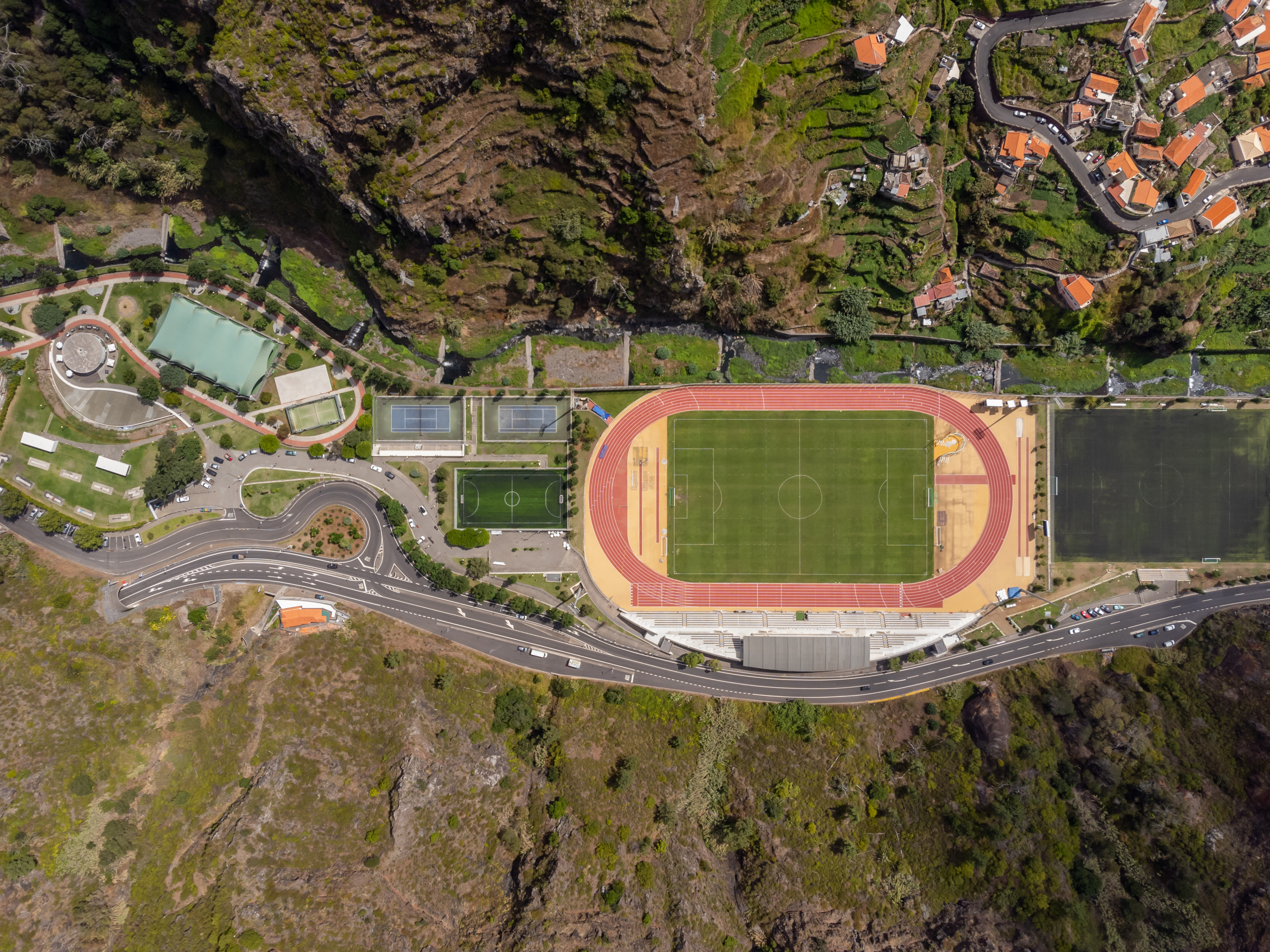

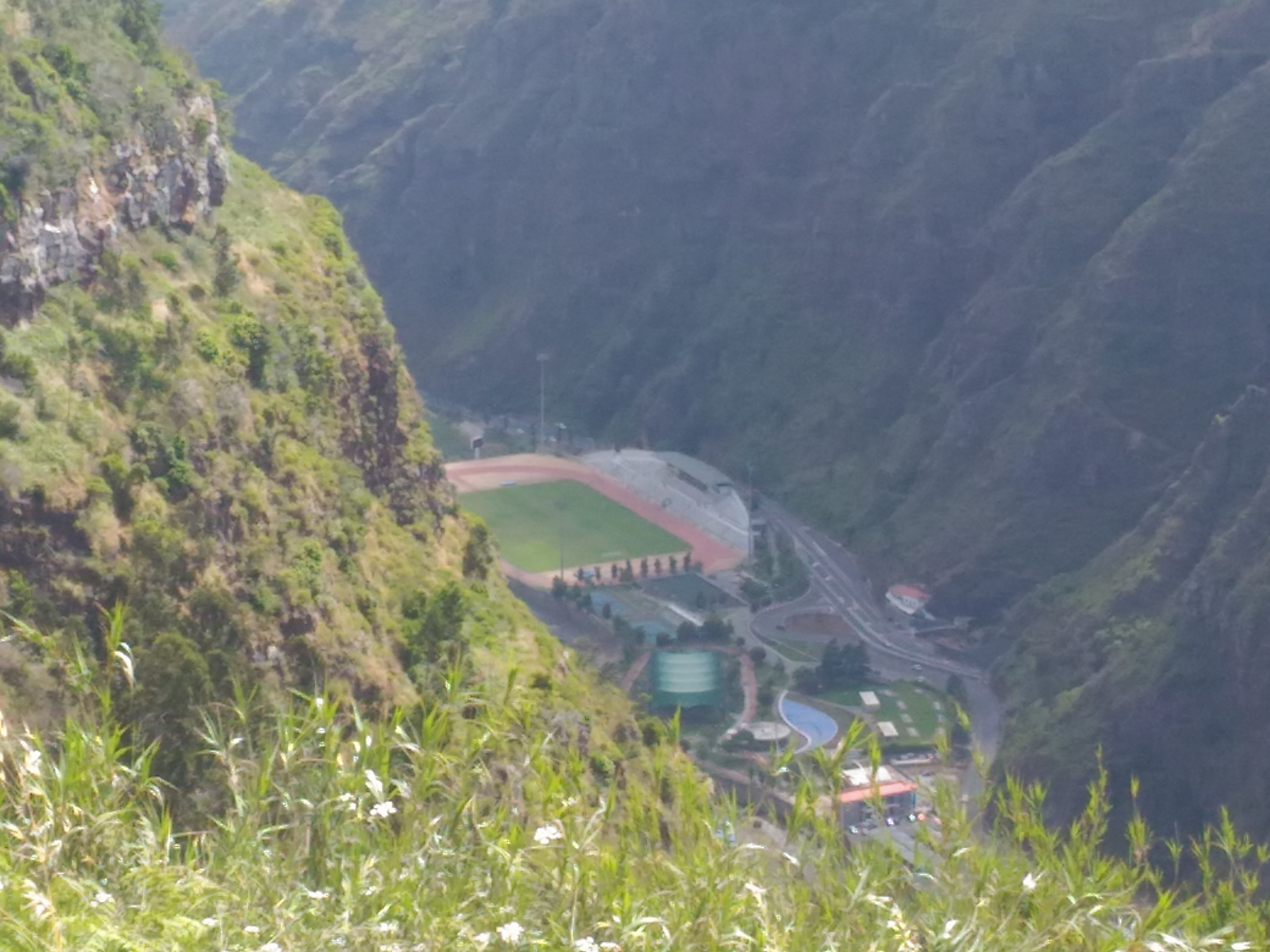

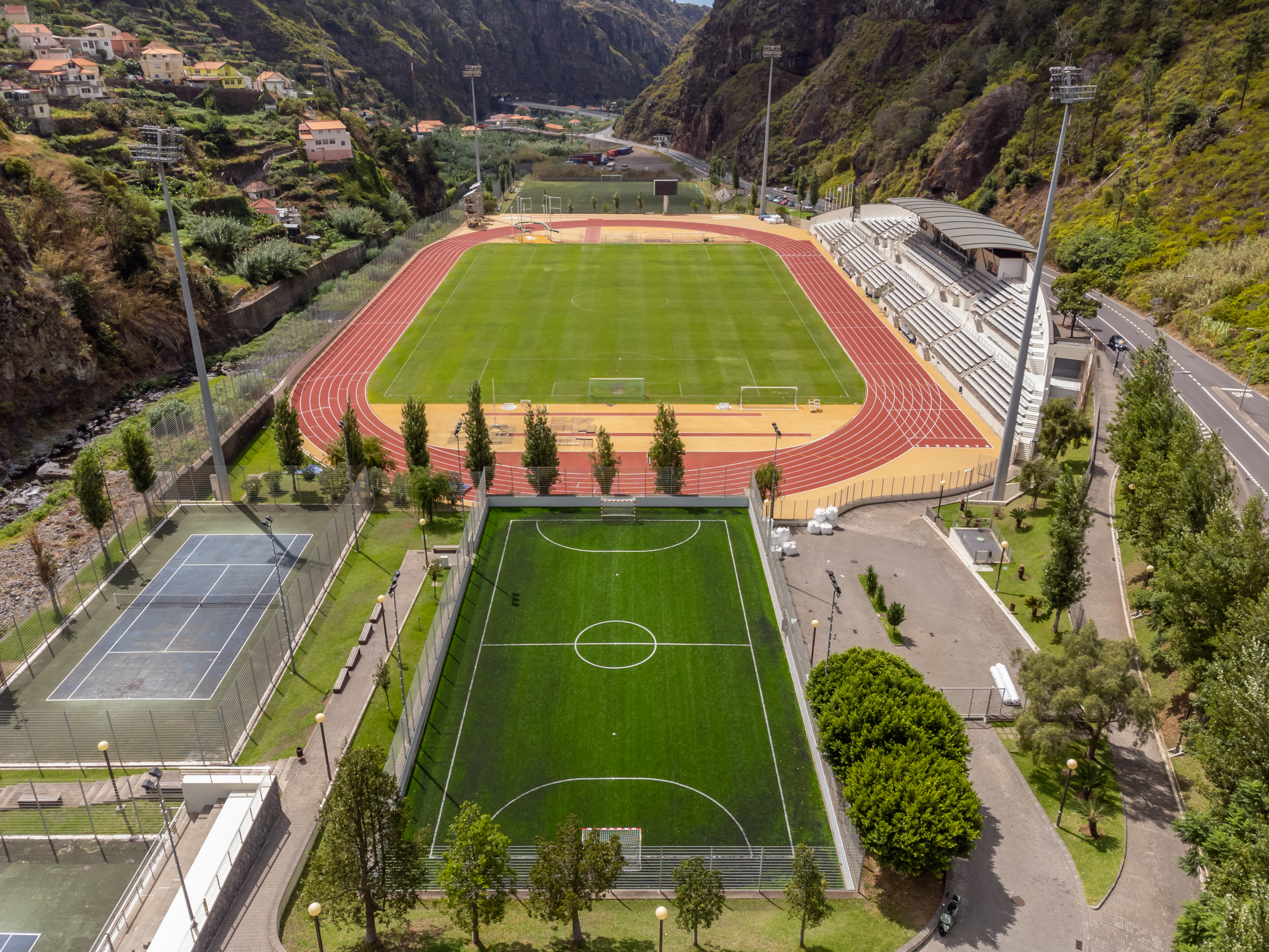
