= 2014–15 Serbian Cup =

2014-15 Serbian Cup
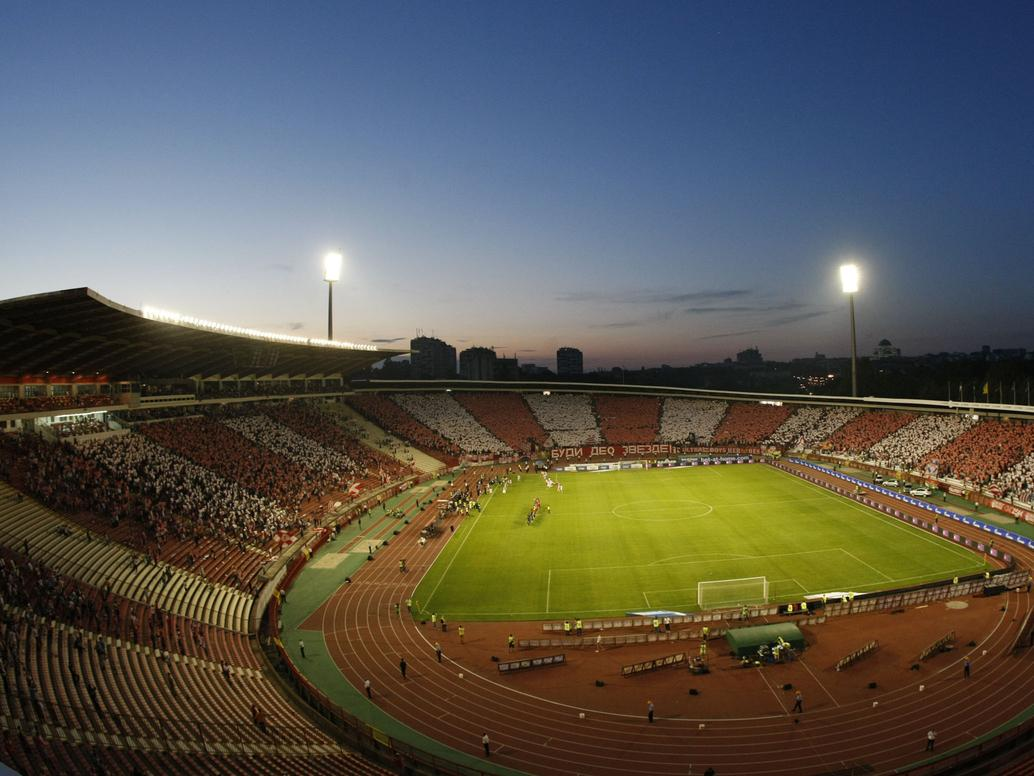
- Stadium Rajko Mitić hosted the final

Tournament details
- Country: Serbia

Final positions
- Champions: Čukarički
- Runners-up: Partizan

Tournament statistics
- Matches played: 37
- Goals scored: 71 (1.92 per match)
- Top goal scorer(s): Stefan Babović (Voždovac); Nikola Stojiljković (Čukarički); Igor Matić (Čukarički); 3 goals

The 2014–15 Serbian Cup season was the ninth season of the Serbian national football tournament.

The competition started on 3 September 2014 and concluded with the final on 20 May 2015.

The winner of the competition, Čukarički, qualified for the 2015–16 UEFA Europa League.

== Calendar ==
Round	Date(s)	Number of fixtures	Clubs	New entries this round
Preliminary round	3 September 2014	4	36 → 32	9
Round of 32	24 September 2014	16	32 → 16	27
Round of 16	29 October 2014	8	16 → 8	none
Quarter-finals	3 December 2014	4	8 → 4	none
Semi-finals	18 March and 8 April 2015	4	4 → 2	none
Final	20 May 2015	1	2 → 1	none

== Preliminary round ==
A preliminary round was held in order to reduce the number of teams competing in the next round to 32. It consisted of 4 single-legged ties (because Smederevo was dissolved leaving a vacancy in the preliminary round), with a penalty shoot-out as the decider, if the score was tied after 90 minutes. The bottom 5 teams from the 2013–14 Serbian First League took part, as well as the 4 regional cup winners and a Kosovo and Metohija representative. The draw contained seeded and unseeded teams. The bottom 5 teams from the 2013–14 Serbian First League (Inđija, Timok, Dolina, Teleoptik and Smederevo) were set as unseeded teams, with the 4 regional cup winners (Dorćol, Semendria 1924, Moravac Mrštane and ČSK Čelarevo) and the Kosovo and Metohija representative being set as seeded teams. The draw was held on 30 August 2014, and was regionalised to minimise expenses for the participating clubs. Because Smederevo withdrew from the cup, the Kosovo and Metohija representative received an automatic bye to the First round. The matches were played on 3 September 2014. In total, around 1250 spectators attended the games (average 313 per game).

3 September 2014	Dorćol (III)	1–0	Dolina (III)	Stadion GSP Poleta, Belgrade
	N. Nikolić 37'			Attendance: 100; Referee: Uroš Vuković

3 September 2014	Semendria 1924 (III)	1–1 (5–3 p)	Teleoptik (III)	Gradski Stadion, Smederevo
	Sočanac 89'; Sočanac (red card) 90+4'		64' Sajčić	Attendance: 200; Referee: Marjan Sarka
	Penalties
	Matić (penalty scored); Cvetković (penalty scored); Momić (penalty scored); Simikić (penalty scored); Roksa (penalty scored)		(penalty scored) Damnjanović; (penalty scored) Minić; (penalty scored) Donevski; (penalty missed) Sajčić

3 September 2014	Moravac Mrštane (II)	1–0	Timok (III)	SC ORION, Mrštane
	Vukosavljević 61' (pen.)			Attendance: 800; Referee: Predrag Milenković

3 September 2014	ČSK Čelarevo (III)	0–2	Inđija (II)	Stadion Pivare, Čelarevo
			44' Bjedov; 86' Jovanović; (penalty missed) 89' Pavković	Attendance: 150; Referee: Dejan Gligorijević

== Round of 32 ==
In this round, five winners from the previous round (Dorćol (III), Semendria 1924 (III), Moravac Mrštane (II), Inđija (II) and Kosovo and Metohija representative (Trepča (IV), not known at moment of draw)) are joined by all 16 teams from Serbian Superliga from 2013–14, as well as top 11 teams from Serbian First League from 2013–14. The draw was conducted on 10 September 2014 and it contained seeded (16 teams from 2013–14 Serbian SuperLiga) and unseeded teams. The matches were played on 24 September 2014. No extra time was played if the score was tied after regular 90 minutes, with those games going straight into penalties. In total, around 22500 spectators attended the games(avg. 1406 per game).

24 September 2014	Proleter Novi Sad (II)	0–0 (4–3 p)	Donji Srem	Stadion Slana Bara, Novi Sad
16:00				Attendance: 700; Referee: Milan Jeremić
	Penalties
	Žigić (penalty scored); Ćovin (penalty scored); Čović (penalty scored); Lekić (penalty missed); Kavčić (penalty scored)		(penalty scored) Beljić; (penalty missed) Zec; (penalty scored) Krunić; (penalty scored) Janković; (penalty missed) Lakić-Pešić

24 September 2014	Dorćol (III)	0–1	Radnički 1923	Stadion GSP Poleta, Belgrade
16:00			37' Arsić	Attendance: 1000; Referee: Dejan Anđelković

24 September 2014	Trepča (IV)	0–1	Vojvodina	Gradski Stadion, Zvečan
	Mlađović (red card) 45'		49' (pen.) Veselinović	Attendance: 5000; Referee: Darko Bogdanović

24 September 2014	Semendria 1924 (III)	0–2	OFK Beograd	Gradski Stadion, Smederevo
16:00			24' Savić; 62' (pen.) Vuković	Attendance: 1000; Referee: Ilija Brdar

24 September 2014	Jedinstvo Užice (II)	0–3	Rad	Stadion Krčagovo, Užice
16:00			10' Simić; 58' Milošević; 83' Jelić	Attendance: 600; Referee: Milorad Milićević

24 September 2014	Inđija (II)	2–1	Javor Ivanjica (II)	Stadion FK Inđija, Inđija
16:00	Zakaria 51', 85'		84' Đokić	Attendance: 300; Referee: Dejan Dimitrijević

24 September 2014	Spartak Subotica	1–0	Radnik Surdulica (II)	Gradski Stadion, Subotica
16:00	Mrkela 26'			Attendance: 200; Referee: Momčilo Marković

24 September 2014	Jagodina	4–0	BSK Borča (II)	Gradski Stadion, Jagodina
16:00	Savković 32', 36'; N. Arsenijević 75' (pen.); F. Arsenijević 81'			Attendance: 500; Referee: Denis Trailović

24 September 2014	Moravac Mrštane (II)	0–1	Radnički Niš	SC ORION, Mrštane
16:00	Regojević (red card) 78'		56' Đorđević	Attendance: 2000; Referee: Dalibor Manojlović

24 September 2014	Sloga Petrovac (II)	1–0	Novi Pazar	Stadion FK Sloga, Petrovac na Mlavi
16:00	Stojanović 79'			Attendance: 3000; Referee: Srđan Jovanović

24 September 2014	Voždovac	3–2	Sloga Kraljevo (II)	SC Stadion, Belgrade
16:00	Babović 28', 65' (pen.); Škerjanc 83'		13' Vujović; 40' Vulić; (red card) 64' Pavlović	Attendance: 500; Referee: Petar Piper

24 September 2014	Bežanija (II)	0–1	Partizan	Stadion FK Obilić, Belgrade
16:00			37' Fofana	Attendance: 1500; Referee: Igor Stojilković

24 September 2014	Sloboda Užice (II)	1–1 (4–3 p)	Sinđelić Beograd (II)	Gradski Stadion, Užice
18:30	Jovanović 90+3'		59' Kalačević	Attendance: 400; Referee: Bojan Nikolić
	Penalties
	Prtenjak (penalty scored); Milekić (penalty scored); Ristić (penalty scored); Đokić (penalty missed); Jeremić (penalty scored)		(penalty scored) Stamatović; (penalty scored) Popadić; (penalty scored) Kalačević; (penalty missed) Piščević; (penalty missed) Jovović

24 September 2014	Napredak Kruševac	0–0 (2–4 p)	Metalac Gornji Milanovac (II)	Stadion Mladost, Kruševac
19:00				Attendance: 1200; Referee: Srđan Obradović
	Penalties
	Govedarica (penalty scored); Cvetković (penalty missed); Janičić (penalty scored); Dimitrov (penalty missed)		(penalty scored) Luković; (penalty scored) Ivanović; (penalty scored) Mladenović; (penalty missed) Vlašić; (penalty scored) Merdović

24 September 2014	Čukarički	3–2	Mladost Lučani	Stadion Čukarički, Belgrade
19:00	Stojiljković 19'; Matić 25' (pen.), 45'		2', 5' Pešić	Attendance: 400; Referee: Milan Ilić

24 September 2014	Red Star Belgrade	1–0	Borac Čačak	Stadion Crvena zvezda, Belgrade
19:00	Despotović 50'			Attendance: 4184; Referee: Robert Kiš-Čepegi

== Round of 16 ==
16 winners from first round took part in this stage of the competition. The draw was held on 6 October 2014, and it contained seeded and unseeded teams. Seeded teams: Red Star Belgrade, Partizan, Jagodina, Vojvodina, Čukarički, Radnički Niš, Voždovac and Spartak Subotica. Unseeded teams: OFK Beograd, Radnički 1923, Rad, Sloboda Užice (II), Metalac Gornji Milanovac (II), Sloga Petrovac (II), Proleter Novi Sad (II) and Inđija (II). Seedings were determined by last seasons final standings in top two Serbian divisions. The matches were played on 29 October and 19 November 2014. No extra time was played if the score was tied after regular 90 minutes, with games going straight into penalties. In total, around 6850 spectators attended the games(avg. 856 per game).

29 October 2014	Spartak Subotica	2–0	Proleter Novi Sad (II)	Gradski Stadion, Subotica
13:00	Lukić 11'; Plavšić 14'		(red card) 38' Vujaklija	Attendance: 200; Referee: Novica Anđelovski

29 October 2014	Rad	1–0	Red Star Belgrade	Stadion FK Obilić, Belgrade
13:00	Perović 50'			Attendance: 2000; Referee: Danilo Grujić

29 October 2014	Radnički 1923	0–3	Jagodina	Stadion Čika Dača, Kragujevac
13:00			22' Lepović; 38' N. Arsenijević; 53' Mitošević	Attendance: 500; Referee: Srđan Jovanović

29 October 2014	Radnički Niš	0–0 (4–1 p)	Inđija (II)	Stadion Čair, Niš
13:00				Attendance: 400; Referee: Darko Bogdanović
	Penalties
	Milenković (penalty scored); Punoševac (penalty scored); Pauljević (penalty scored); Đuričković (penalty scored)		(penalty missed) Jovanović; (penalty scored) Čordašić; (penalty missed) Ilić

29 October 2014	Vojvodina	1–0	Sloboda Užice (II)	Stadion Karađorđe, Novi Sad
18:00	Alivodić 7'			Attendance: 1500; Referee: Marko Popović

29 October 2014	Metalac Gornji Milanovac (II)	0–0 (4–5 p)	Voždovac	Stadion Metalac, Gornji Milanovac
18:30	Sedlar (red card) 87'		(yellow card) 32' (yellow-red card) Mihajlov	Attendance: 1000; Referee: Majo Vujović
	Penalties
	Luković (penalty missed); Ivanović (penalty scored); Mladenović (penalty scored); Simov (penalty scored); Brkić (penalty scored); Nikodijević (penalty missed)		(penalty scored) Sinđić; (penalty scored) Petrović; (penalty missed) Nikolić; (penalty scored) Kitanovski; (penalty scored) Zlatković; (penalty scored) Beljić

19 November 2014	OFK Beograd	1–2	Čukarički	Omladinski Stadion, Belgrade
13:00	Savić 80'		33' Stojiljković; 50' Matić	Attendance: 250; Referee: Nenad Đokić

19 November 2014	Partizan	3–0	Sloga Petrovac (II)	Stadion Partizana, Belgrade
17:00	Marković 24'; Ninković 69'; Škuletić 74'			Attendance: 1000; Referee: Dejan Santrač

== Quarter-finals ==
8 winners from second round took part in this stage of the competition. The draw contained seeded and unseeded teams. Seedings were determined by following key: Last season's cup semifinalists were automatically set as seeded teams, with remaining seeds determined by last season final standings in top two Serbian divisions. Seeded teams: Vojvodina, Jagodina, Spartak Subotica and Partizan. Unseeded teams: Čukarički, Radnički Niš, Voždovac, Rad. The matches were played on 3 December 2014. In total, around 3250 spectators attended the games(avg. 813 per game).

3 December 2014	Radnički Niš	0–1	Jagodina	Stadion Čair, Niš
13:00			31' Đurić	Attendance: 500; Referee: Aleksandar Vasić

3 December 2014	Čukarički	2–1	Vojvodina	Stadion Čukarički, Belgrade
13:00	Regan 10'; Bojić 47'		13' Poletanović	Attendance: 500; Referee: Vlado Glođović

3 December 2014	Rad	0–1	Partizan	Stadion Kralj Petar I, Belgrade
13:00	M. Marković (red card) 45'		45+1' (pen.) Škuletić	Attendance: 2000; Referee: Dejan Filipović

3 December 2014	Voždovac	2–1	Spartak Subotica	SC Stadion, Belgrade
13:00	Babović 14'; Škerjanc 90+3'		(yellow card) 90+2' (yellow-red card) Milić; 90+4' Ilić	Attendance: 250; Referee: Danilo Grujić

== Semi-finals ==
4 winners from Quarter finals (Jagodina, Partizan, Čukarički and Voždovac) took part in the semi-finals. The draw was held on 5 December 2014. There were no seedings in the draw. Semi-finals were contested over two legs. Aggregate winners qualified for the Cup finals. First legs were played on 18 March 2015, and second legs were played on 8 April 2015. In total, around 5600 spectators attended the games(avg. 1400 per game).

Team 1	Agg.	Team 2	1st leg	2nd leg
Čukarički	6–1	Voždovac	2–0	4–1
Partizan	5–0	Jagodina	3–0	2–0

=== First legs ===
18 March 2015 SF	Čukarički	2–0	Voždovac	Stadion Čukarički, Belgrade
16:00	Mirosavljević 15', 40'			Attendance: 800; Referee: Bojan Nikolić

18 March 2015 SF	Partizan	3–0	Jagodina	Stadion Partizana, Belgrade
18:00	Grbić 3'; A. Živković 44'; Brašanac 90+2'			Attendance: 2500; Referee: Aleksandar Vasić

=== Second legs ===
8 April 2015 SF	Voždovac	1–4 (1–6 agg.)	Čukarički	SC Stadion, Belgrade
16:30	Zlatković 14' (pen.); Kitanovski (red card) 71'		7' Ostojić; 64' S. Srnić; 75' Stojiljković; 90' Mandić	Attendance: 800; Referee: Dejan Filipović

8 April 2015 SF	Jagodina	0–2 (0–5 agg.)	Partizan	Gradski Stadion, Jagodina
19:00			3' Šaponjić; 27' A. Živković	Attendance: 1500; Referee: Nenad Đokić

== Final ==
2 winners from Semi-finals took part in the single-legged final. The final game was played on 20 May 2015.

20 May 2015	Čukarički	1–0	Partizan	Stadion Crvena zvezda, Belgrade
20:30	S. Srnić 38'			Attendance: 10000; Referee: Vlado Glođović
