= Igor Matić =

Serbian footballer (born 1981)

Personal information
- Date of birth: 22 July 1981 (age 45)
- Place of birth: Bugojno, SFR Yugoslavia
- Height: 1.76 m (5 ft 9 1/2 in)
- Position: Midfielder

Senior career*
Years	Team	Apps	(Gls)
1998–2003	Zemun	71	(11)
2003–2005	OFK Beograd	36	(11)
2005–2006	Caen	24	(2)
2008	Banat Zrenjanin	11	(0)
2008	Megasport Almaty	11	(0)
2009–2010	Grbalj	27	(9)
2010–2012	Mogren	43	(10)
2012	Napredak Kruševac	16	(3)
2012–2017	Čukarički	131	(24)
Total		370	(70)

International career
2002–2004	Serbia and Montenegro U21	11	(3)
2004	Serbia and Montenegro Olympic	2	(0)

Managerial career
- 2023: Čukarički
- 2024: Novi Pazar
Medal record
Silver medal – second place	UEFA Under-21 Championship	2004
- * Club domestic league appearances and goals

Igor Matić (Serbian Cyrillic: Игор Матић; born 22 July 1981) is a retired Serbian footballer who played as a deep-lying playmaker. He represented Serbia and Montenegro at the men's football tournament in the 2004 Summer Olympics.

== Club career ==
=== Zemun ===
Matić began his senior football career with FK Zemun in 1998. As a 19-year-old, he was one of the players involved in Zemun's famous drive in the semifinals of the 1999-2000 Cup of Yugoslavia. He played for Zemun until 2003.

=== OFK Beograd ===
Matić joined OFK Beograd from Zemun in 2003, and played alongside Branislav Ivanović in one of the strongest generations of OFK Beograd that decade. One highlight of Matić's spell at OFK was making the 2004 UEFA Intertoto semifinals before being eliminated by Atlético Madrid.

=== Mogren ===
Matić joined Mogren from Grbalj in 2010, where he would spend two years and amass 43 appearances and contribute with 10 goals. In January 2012, Matić sued Mogren in Montenegro's arbitrage court because he wasn't paid for over five months.

=== Napredak ===
After leaving Mogren on a sour note, Matić joined Napredak Kruševac in January 2012, who had just hired Aleksandar Kristić as their coach. This was an important factor in Matić choosing to join Napredak, as he and Kristić had known each other since he was at OFK Beograd, as Kristić was one of OFK's youth coaches at the time.

=== Čukarički ===
"Čukarički is dangerous in set pieces because of Matić..."

— Slaviša Stojanovič, Red Star coach in April 2014

After only a half-season with Napredak, Matić quickly joined Čukarički, which was in 2012 the first privatized professional football club in Serbia. He would become Čukarički's playmaker and contribute to their promotion to the first-tier SuperLiga. In an October 2013 article titled "They are the 'oldies', everyone fears them", Serbia's Sportal named Matić in an 11-man selection of the best players over the age of 28 in the SuperLiga. On 18 March 2015, he suffered a hamstring injury which sidelined him for two weeks. After five years with Čukarički, Matić retired from playing football professionally in 2017.

== International career ==
Despite having born in Bugojno, SR Bosnia and Herzegovina, he opted to represent Serbia and Montenegro internationally. Matić was part of the Serbia and Montenegro national under-21 team that finished runners-up at the 2004 European Championship. He was also part of the Serbia and Montenegro team at the 2004 Summer Olympics.

== Managerial statistics ==
As of 16 March 2024

Managerial record by team and tenure
Team	From	To	Record				
Team	From	To	G	W	D	L	Win %
Čukarički	15 August 2023	26 December 2023	25	8	4	13	32.00
Novi Pazar	5 January 2024	Present	7	1	3	3	14.29
Career total			32	9	7	16	28.13

== Honours ==
Čukarički

- Serbian Cup (1): 2014–15
