= 2014–15 FK Partizan season =

Partizan Belgrade
2014–15 season
- President: Dragan Đurić (until 25 December 2014); Zoran Popović
- Head coach: Marko Nikolić (until 25 March 2015); Zoran Milinković
- Stadium: Partizan Stadium (32,710)
- Serbian SuperLiga: 1st
- Serbian Cup: Runners-up
- Champions League: Third qualifying round
- Europa League: Group stage (4th)
- Top goalscorer: League: Petar Skuletic (14); All: Petar Skuletic (21)
- Highest home attendance: vs Red Star (25,000) (18.10.2014)
- Lowest home attendance: vs OFK Beograd (2,000) (29.10.2014)
Home colours	Away colours	Third colours

The 2014–15 season was FK Partizan's 9th season in Serbian SuperLiga.

== Season overview ==
In summer 2014, Partizan has qualified to the UEFA Europa League where they have won two points in a group with Tottenham, Beşiktaş and Asteras Tripolis.

Partizan scored one goal in 2014–15 UEFA Europa League. That one goal scored Saša Marković vs Beşiktaş on Atatürk Olympic Stadium in Istanbul. The first game in Europe was held on 15 July 2014 against HB Tórshavn on Partizan Stadium in UEFA Champions League Second qualifying round. That night Partizan won 3–0, in a rematch also won 3–1, and passed in Third qualifying round. In the third qualifying round Partizan's opponent was Ludogorets Razgrad. In Razgrad the match was played without goals, but in Belgrade it was 2-2. Ludogorets won on away goals. In Play-off round UEFA Europa League Partizan played against Neftchi Baku. First game in Belgrade Partizan won 3–2, in that game 2 own goals were witnessed, but in Baku Partizan also won n 2–1. On 18 September Partizan played against Tottenham in Belgrade. In this game there was no winner and the result was 0-0.Partizan was attacking and had more shots from Tottenham. On 23 October Partizan played against Beşiktaş and lost 0–4. In this match Škuletić was played first time in UEFA Europa League after the suspension of 2 game. On 25 March manager Marko Nikolić replaced Zoran Milinković as the head coach at the club.

Marko Nikolic was sacked because of poor performance in the spring part although he had a contract until the end of the season. On 4 April Milinkovic debuted on the Partizan bench against Radnički 1923. In that match Partizan won n 2–1. Same day Partizans biggest rival Red Star lost and so Partizan went from +2 to +5. On 13 May Partizan won against Napredak Kruševac and won the title of Serbian champion. Then Partizan won 26 title and equalized with the biggest rival (Red Star) by number of champion titles.

In Serbian Cup, Partizan came to the finals by beating FK Bežanija 1–0, 3-0 FK Sloga Petrovac na Mlavi and Rad 1–0.In the semi-finals Partizan won against Jagodina Total score 5–0. To the finals Partizan won all his matches without conceding a goal. On 20 May in the final Partizan lost to Čukarički 1–0.And he didn't won the double crown.

== Transfers ==
=== In ===
Date	Position	Name	From	Type	Ref.
13 June 2014	GK	(Serbia) Filip Kljajić	(Serbia) Teleoptik	Loan Recall	
13 June 2014	MF	(Serbia) Saša Lukić	(Serbia) Teleoptik	Sign	
13 June 2014	DF	(Serbia) Miroslav Bogosavac	(Serbia) Teleoptik	Sign	
13 June 2014	DF	(Serbia) Miladin Stevanović	(Serbia) Teleoptik	Sign	
10 July 2014	DF	(Slovenia) Branko Ilić	(Israel) Hapoel T.A	Transfer	
4 August 2014	MF	(Serbia) Ivan Petrović	(Serbia) FK Radnički 1923	Transfer	
7 August 2014	FW	(Serbia) Nenad Marinković	(Israel) Hapoel Ironi Acre F.C.	Transfer	
20 August 2014	DF	(Serbia) Lazar Ćirković	(Serbia) FK Rad	Transfer	
31 December 2014	DF	(North Macedonia) Stefan Aškovski	(Norway) Strømsgodset IF.	Loan Recall	
14 January 2015	MF	(Serbia) Stefan Babović	(Serbia) FK Voždovac	Transfer	
31 January 2015	DF	(Bulgaria) Ivan Bandalovski	(Belgium) Oud-Heverlee Leuven	Transfer	
4 February 2015	DF	(Slovenia) Gregor Balažic	(Ukraine) FC Karpaty Lviv	Transfer	

=== Out ===
Date	Position	Name	To	Type	Ref.
16 June 2014	GK	(Serbia) Nikola Petrović	End of contract	Released	
16 June 2014	DF	(Serbia) Milan Obradovic	(Serbia) OFK Beograd.	Released	
4 July 2014	MF	(Serbia) Filip Knežević	(Portugal) Vitória S.C.	Loan	
25 July 2014	DF	(North Macedonia) Stefan Aškovski	(Norway) Strømsgodset IF	Loan	
2 August 2014	MF	(Brazil) Eliomar Correia Silva	(Greece) Pierikos	Loan	
29 August 2014	DF	(Serbia) Branko Pauljević	(Serbia) FK Radnički Niš	Loan	
13 October 2014	DF	(Serbia) Branislav Trajković	Unattached	Released	
1 September 2014	DF/MF	(Serbia) Nikola Gulan	(Spain) RCD Mallorca	Transfer	
1 January 2015	DF	(Serbia) Vojislav Stanković	(Azerbaijan) Inter Baku PIK	Transfer	
13 January 2015	DF	(North Macedonia) Stefan Aškovski	(North Macedonia) FK Shkëndija.	Loan	
9 January 2015	FW	(Ivory Coast) Ismaël Béko Fofana	(China) Qingdao Jonoon F.C.	Loan	
9 January 2015	DF	(Serbia) Saša Ivković	(Serbia) FK Voždovac	Loan	
22 January 2015	MF	(Brazil) Eliomar Correia Silva	(Greece) AEL	Loan	
9 February 2015	FW/SS	(Serbia) Danko Lazović	(China) Beijing Enterprises.	Transfer	
12 February 2015	RB	(Serbia) Branko Pauljević	(Hungary) Pécsi MFC.	Loan	
13 February 2015	FW	(Serbia) Petar Škuletić	(Russia) Lokomotiv Moscow.	Transfer	

For recent transfers, see List of Serbian football transfers winter 2014–15. For summer transfers, see List of Serbian football transfers summer 2014.

== Players ==
=== Squad ===
No.	Name	Nationality	Position (s)	Date of birth (age)	Signed from
Goalkeepers
1	Živko Živković	(Serbia)	GK	14 April 1989 (25)	Youth system
12	Filip Kljajić	(Serbia)	GK	16 August 1990 (24)	(Serbia) Rad
25	Milan Lukač	(Serbia)	GK	4 October 1989 (24)	(Serbia) OFK Beograd
Defenders
2	Ivan Bandalovski	(Bulgaria)	RB	23 August 1986 (28)	(Belgium) Oud-Heverlee Leuven
3	Vladimir Volkov	(Montenegro)	LB	6 June 1986 (28)	(Moldova) FC Sheriff Tiraspol
4	Miroslav Vulićević	(Serbia)	RB	29 May 1985 (29)	(Serbia) FK Vojvodina
5	Nemanja Petrović	(Serbia)	LB	17 April 1992 (22)	Youth system
6	Gregor Balažic	(Slovenia)	CB	12 February 1988 (27)	(Ukraine) FC Karpaty Lviv
13	Lazar Ćirković	(Serbia)	CB	22 August 1992 (22)	(Serbia) Rad
30	Branko Ilić	(Slovenia)	RB / CB	6 February 1983 (32)	(Israel) Hapoel Tel Aviv
35	Miladin Stevanović	(Serbia)	CB / RB	11 February 1996 (19)	Youth system
40	Miloš Ostojić	(Serbia)	CB	3 August 1991 (23)	(Serbia) Teleoptik
Midfielders
7	Predrag Luka	(Serbia)	MF	11 May 1988 (26)	(Serbia) Rad
8	Darko Brašanac	(Serbia)	DM/CM	2 February 1992 (23)	Youth system
10	Stefan Babović	(Serbia)	AM/CM/DM	7 January 1987 (28)	(Serbia) Voždovac
11	Nikola Ninković	(Serbia)	AM / RW/LW	19 December 1994 (20)	Youth system
14	Petar Grbić	(Montenegro)	RW / RM	7 August 1988 (26)	(Greece) Olympiacos
17	Andrija Živković	(Serbia)	RW/RM / LW/LM	11 July 1996 (18)	Youth system
18	Nikola Drinčić	(Montenegro)	DM/CM	7 September 1984 (30)	(Russia) Krasnodar
20	Saša Lukić	(Serbia)	CM/AM	13 August 1996 (18)	Youth system
21	Saša Marković	(Serbia)	DM/CM	13 March 1991 (24)	(Serbia) OFK Beograd
22	Saša Ilić (captain)	(Serbia)	CM/AM	30 December 1977 (37)	(Austria) FC Red Bull Salzburg
28	Ivan Petrović	(Serbia)	DM/CM	3 July 1993 (21)	(Serbia) FK Radnički 1923
Forwards
9	Nemanja Kojić	(Serbia)	ST / CF	3 February 1990 (25)	(Serbia) Rad
29	Nenad Marinković	(Serbia)	RW	28 September 1988 (26)	(Israel) Hapoel Acre
33	Ivan Šaponjić	(Serbia)	CF	2 August 1997 (17)	Youth system

== Competitions ==
=== Overview ===
Competition	Record							
Competition	P	W	D	L	GF	GA	GD	Win %
Superliga	30	21	8	1	67	22	+45	70.00
Serbian Cup	6	5	0	1	10	1	+9	83.33
UEFA Europa League	12	4	4	4	14	15	−1	33.33
Total	48	30	12	6	91	38	+53	62.50

	Competition	Position
(Serbia)	Serbian SuperLiga	Winners
(Serbia)	Serbian Cup	Runner-up
(European Union)	UEFA Champions League	Third qualifying round
(European Union)	UEFA Europa League	Group stage

=== Serbian SuperLiga ===
==== League table ====
Pos	Team	Pld	W	D	L	GF	GA	GD	Pts	Qualification or relegation
1	Partizan (C)	30	21	8	1	67	22	+45	71	Qualification for Champions League second qualifying round
2	Red Star Belgrade	30	19	7	4	46	20	+26	64	Qualification for Europa League first qualifying round (Note: Since Čukarički and Partizan got to the 2014–15 Serbian Cup final, the fourth placed team to have qualified for the first qualifying round of the 2015–16 UEFA Europa League)
3	Čukarički	30	16	9	5	48	24	+24	57	Qualification for Europa League first qualifying round
4	Vojvodina	30	16	4	10	44	36	+8	52	Qualification for Europa League first qualifying round
5	Novi Pazar	30	13	8	9	39	28	+11	47	

Source: Serbian SuperLiga
Rules for classification: 1) points; 2) head-to-head points; 3) head-to-head goal difference; 4) head-to-head goals scored; 5) goal difference; 6) number of goals scored.
(C) Champions

==== Results and positions by round ====
Round	1	2	3	4	5	6	7	8	9	10	11	12	13	14	15	16	17	18	19	20	21	22	23	24	25	26	27	28	29	30
Ground	A	A	H	A	H	A	H	A	H	A	H	A	H	A	H	H	H	A	H	A	H	A	H	A	H	A	H	A	H	A
Result	W	W	W	W	W	W	D	W	W	L	W	W	W	D	W	D	D	W	W	D	W	W	W	D	W	W	W	W	D	D
Position	2	1	1	1	1	1	1	1	1	1	1	1	1	1	1	1	1	1	1	1	1	1	1	1	1	1	1	1	1	1

Updated to match(es) played on 24 May 2015. Source: superliga.rs
A = Away; H = Home; W = Win; D = Draw; L = Loss

==== Matches ====
10 August 2014 1	Voždovac	1–3	Partizan	Belgrade
17:00 CET	Obradović (yellow card) 50'; Supić (yellow card) 53'; Stefan Tripković 74' (yellow card) 75' (yellow-red card) 90'; Obradović (yellow card) 90'	Report (in Serbian)	Grbić (yellow card) 53'; Gulan (yellow card) 66'; Danijel Stojković 79' (o.g.); Volkov (yellow card) 90' (goal) 90+2'; Ismaël Béko Fofana 90+5'	Stadium: Stadion Obilić; Attendance: 2,000; Referee: Nenad Đokić

16 August 2014 2	Radnički Niš	1–4	Partizan	Niš
19:00 CET	I. Petrović (yellow card) 43'; Đorđević (yellow card) 64'; Ćulum 58'; P. Petrović (yellow card) 90'	Report (in Serbian)	Grbić 1'; Lazović 27'; Đorđević 69' (o.g.); Škuletić 75'	Stadium: Čair; Attendance: 8,000; Referee: Dejan Dimitrijević

24 August 2014 3	Partizan	3–0	Donji Srem	Belgrade
19:00 CET	B. Ilić (yellow card) 31'; Škuletić 45+1' (pen.); Lazović 67'; S.Marković 76'	Report (in Serbian)	Abdul Rashid Obuobi (yellow card) 76'	Stadium: Stadion Partizana; Attendance: 5,000; Referee: Petar Piper

31 August 2014 4	Rad	0–4	Partizan	Belgrade
17:00 CET	Gnjatić (yellow card) 60'; Veselinović (yellow card) 31'	Report (in Serbian)	Škuletić 26'; Lazović 42', 58'; Ismaël Béko Fofana 86'	Stadium: Stadion Kralj Petar I Attendance: / Referee: Bojan Nikolić

13 September 2014 5	Partizan	4–2	Čukarički	Belgrade
19:30 CET	Pantić 10'; Vulićević (yellow card) 25'; Lazović 53'; Škuletić 75'; Luka 84'	Report (in Serbian)	Stojiljković (yellow card) 34' (goal) 41'; S.Srnić 42'; Ristić (yellow card) 43'; Ukah (yellow card) 62'	Stadium: Stadion Partizana; Attendance: 3,000; Referee: Marko Popović

21 September 2014 6	Radnički 1923	0–3	Partizan	Kragujevac
16:00 CET		Report (in Serbian)	Škuletić 11' (pen.), 18'; Ilić 89'	Stadium: Čika Dača; Attendance: 3,000; Referee: Majo Vujović

29 October 2014 7	Partizan	1–1	OFK Beograd	Beograd
16:00 CET	Lazović 65'	Report (in Serbian)	Dražić 41'	Stadium: Stadion Partizana; Attendance: 2,000; Referee: Nenad Đokić

5 October 2014 8	Mladost Lučani	1–2	Partizan	Lučani
15:00 CET	Patrick Friday Eze 73'	Report (in Serbian)	Škuletić 45+1'; Lazović 58'	Stadium: Mladost Stadium; Attendance: 2,000; Referee: Danilo Grujić

18 October 2014 9	Partizan	1–0	Red Star	Belgrade
19:00 CET	Drinčić 77'	Report (in Serbian)		Stadium: Stadion Partizana; Attendance: 25,000; Referee: Milorad Mažić

26 October 2014 10	Jagodina	1–0	Partizan	Jagodina
17:00 CET	Jovančić 55'	Report (in Serbian)		Stadium: Gradski Stadion Jagodina; Attendance: 2,000; Referee: Aleksandar Vasić

2 November 2014 11	Partizan	1–0	Vojvodina	Belgrade
19:00 CET	Škuletić 32'	Report (in Serbian)		Stadium: Stadion Partizana; Attendance: 8,000; Referee: Nenad Đokić

9 November 2014 12	Spartak ZV	0–3	Partizan	Subotica
13:00 CET		Report (in Serbian)	Škuletić 33', 80', 81'	Stadium: Subotica City Stadium; Attendance: 3,000; Referee: Srđan Obradović

23 November 2014 13	Partizan	3–1	Napredak Kruševac	Belgrade
17:00 CET	Lazović 36'; B.Ilić 72'; Škuletić 85'	Report (in Serbian)	N'Diaye 90'	Stadium: Stadion Partizana; Attendance: 3,000; Referee: Vlado Glođović

30 November 2014 14	Novi Pazar	1–1	Partizan	Novi Pazar
13:00 CET	B.Ilić 77' (o.g.)	Report (in Serbian)	Lazović 4'	Stadium: Gradski Stadion; Attendance: 6,000; Referee: Vlado Glođović

7 December 2014 15	Partizan	5–1	Borac Čačak	Belgrade
15:00 CET	Volkov 42'; Škuletić 65', 90'; Živković 67'; Ilić 88'	Report (in Serbian)	Đoković 19'	Stadium: Stadion Partizana; Attendance: 2,000; Referee: Novica Anđelovski

21 February 2015 16	Partizan	3–3	Voždovac	Belgrade
16:00 CET	Ninković 14'; Kojić (yellow card) 39'; B.Ilić 50'; Stanimirović 85' (o.g.)	Report (in Serbian)	Škerjanc 26'; Kitanovski (yellow card) 27'; Grbić (yellow card) 34'; Stojković (yellow card) 87'; M. Pavlović (yellow card) 87'; Odita 74'; Džugurdić 79'	Stadium: Stadion Partizana; Attendance: 5,000; Referee: Jovanović Srđan

28 February 2015. 17	Partizan	0–0	Radnički Niš	Belgrade
17:00 CET	A. Živković (yellow card) 38'	Report (in Serbian)	Popara (yellow card) 14'; Bulatović (yellow card) 59'; Pejčić (yellow card) 66'	Stadium: Stadion Partizana; Attendance: 4,000; Referee: Kiš Čepegi Robert

7 March 2015. 18	Donji Srem	1–2	Partizan	Novi Sad
17:00 CET	Moro (yellow card) 18'; Josimov (yellow card) 43'; Spalević 26'	Report (in Serbian)	Kojić 36', 74'; Babović (yellow card) 59'; Volkov (yellow card) 80'	Stadium: Stadion Karađorđe; Attendance: 5,000; Referee: Nikolić Bojan

14 March 2015. 19	Partizan	2–0	Rad	Belgrade
17:00 CET	Drinčić 31'; Ninković 50'	Report (in Serbian)	Jelić (yellow card) 29'	Stadium: Stadion Partizana; Attendance: 3,000; Referee: Jeremić Milan

22 March 2015. 20	Čukarički	2–2	Partizan	Belgrade
17:00 CET	Bojić 14'; Stojiljkovic 74' (yellow card) 74'; Regan (yellow card) 85'; D. Srnić (yellow card) 86'	Report (in Serbian)	Babović 14'; A. Živković (yellow card) 27'; Šaponjić (yellow card) 89'; B. Ilić 90'; S. Ilić (yellow card) 90+5'	Stadium: Čukarički Stadium; Attendance: 3,000; Referee: Milorad Mažić

4 April 2015. 21	Partizan	2–1	Radnički 1923	Belgrade
18:00 CET	Volkov (yellow card) 53'; Babović 64'; S. Ilić 73'; Kojić (yellow card) 88'	Report (in Serbian)	B. Miljuš (yellow card) 22'; Osei Bonsu (yellow card) 31'; D. Miljuš (yellow card) 66'; Trifunović (yellow card) 66'; Rosić 71'	Stadium: Stadion Partizana; Attendance: 3,000; Referee: Milan Ilić

13 April 2015. 22	OFK Beograd	1–3	Partizan	Belgrade
16:00 CET	Antonov (yellow card) 54'; Janković (yellow card) 73'; Zarubica 85'	Report (in Serbian)	A. Živković 15'; A. Živković 50'; Šaponjić (yellow card) 54' (goal) 63'	Stadium: Stadion Obilić; Attendance: 3,000; Referee: Vlado Glođović

19 April 2015. 23	Partizan	3–0	Mladost Lučani	Belgrade
18:00 CET	Marković 12' (yellow card) 46'; Šaponjić 18'; Balažic (yellow card) 51'; A. Živković 58'	Report (in Serbian)	Patrick Friday Eze (yellow card) 56'	Stadium: Stadion Partizana; Attendance: 2,000; Referee: Danilo Grujić

25 April 2015. 24	Red Star	0–0	Partizan	Belgrade
18:00 CET	Jovanović (yellow card) 3'; Kovacevic (yellow card) 40'; Katai (yellow card) 88'	Report (in Serbian)	Volkov (yellow card) 5'; S. Ilić (yellow card) 59'; Balažic (yellow card) 76'; Drinčić (yellow card) 85'	Stadium: Stadion Rajko Mitić; Attendance: 44,120; Referee: Milorad Mažić

29 April 2015. 25	Partizan	1–0	Jagodina	Belgrade
18:30 CET	Šaponjić 28'; A. Živković (yellow card) 38'; Grbić (yellow card) 86'; Petrović (yellow card) 90'	Report (in Serbian)	Savković (yellow card) 43'; Gašić (yellow card) 86'; Antić (yellow card) 90+2'	Stadium: Stadion Partizana; Attendance: 2,000; Referee: Nenad Đokić

3 May 2015. 26	Vojvodina	0–4	Partizan	Novi Sad
19:00 CET	Luković (yellow card) 34'	Report (in Serbian)	Volkov 37', 71'; Ninković 90'; Brašanac 90+1'	Stadium: Stadion Karađorđe; Attendance: 6,000; Referee: Dimitrijević Dejan

9 May 2015. 27	Partizan	1–0	Spartak ZV	Belgrade
19:00 CET	Bandalovski (yellow card) 57'; Ninković (yellow card) 84' (goal) 90'	Report (in Serbian)	Jočić (yellow card) 23'	Stadium: Stadion Partizana; Attendance: 5,000; Referee: Milorad Mažić

13 May 2015. 28	Napredak Kruševac	0–2	Partizan	Kruševac
18:00 CET		Report (in Serbian)	Brašanac (yellow card) 10'; B. Ilić 62'; A. Živković 82'	Stadium: Mladost Stadium (Kruševac); Attendance: 9,000; Referee: Dejan Santrač

16 May 2015. 29	Partizan	1–1	Novi Pazar	Belgrade
17:00 CET	Lukić (yellow card) 8'; Šaponjić 42'; Ćirković (yellow card) 54'	Report (in Serbian)	Pavlović 20'; Stevanović (yellow card) 56'; Jevtović (yellow card) 82'	Stadium: Stadion Partizana; Attendance: 15,000; Referee: Srđan Obradović

24 May 2015 30	Borac Čačak	3–3	Partizan	Čačak
17:00 CET	Ožegović 27'; Zec 50'; Mutavžić 57'	Report (in Serbian)	Luka 16'; Marinković 29'; Ninković (yellow card) 37' (red card) 66'; Grbić 79' (pen.); Petrović (yellow card) 80'	Stadium: Čačak Stadium; Attendance: 3,000; Referee: Majo Vujović

=== Serbian Cup ===
==== Serbian Cup ====
24 September 2014 R1	Bežanija	0–1	Partizan	Belgrade
16:00		Report (in Serbian)	Ismaël Béko Fofana 37'; Lazović (yellow card) 76'	Stadium: Stadion Obilić; Attendance: 1,000; Referee: Stoiljković Igor

19 November 2014 R2	Partizan	3–0	Sloga Petrovac na Mlavi	Belgrade
16:00	Marković 24' (yellow card) 51'; Grbić (yellow card) 36'; Ninković 69'; Škuletić (yellow card) 64' (goal) 74'	Report (in Serbian)	Planić (yellow card) 7'; Mišić (yellow card) 36'; Lepojević (yellow card) 44'	Stadium: Stadion Partizana; Attendance: 1,000; Referee: Dejan Santrač

3 December 2014 QF	Rad	0–1	Partizan	Belgrade
13:00	M.Marković (red card) 45'; Stančeški (yellow card) 84'	Report (in Serbian)	Škuletić 45' (pen.); Marković (yellow card) 53'; Ninković (yellow card) 88'	Stadium: Stadion Obilić; Attendance: 2,000; Referee: Dejan Filipović

18 March 2015 Semi-finals round 1	Partizan	3–0	Jagodina	Belgrade
18:00	Grbić 3'; A. Živković 44'; Šaponjić (yellow card) 73'; Brašanac 90+3'	Report (in Serbian)	Antić (yellow card) 35'; Lepović (yellow card) 53'	Stadium: Stadion Partizana; Attendance: 3,000; Referee: Aleksandar Vasić

8 April 2015 Semi-finals round 2	Jagodina	0–2 (0 – 5 agg.)	Partizan	Jagodina
19:00		Report (in Serbian)	Šaponjić 3'; A. Živković 27'	Stadium: Jagodina City Stadium; Referee: Nenad Đokić

20 May 2015 Final	Čukarički	1–0	Partizan	Belgrade
20:30	Brežančić (yellow card) 9'; S. Srnić 39' (yellow card) 58'; Ostojić (yellow card) 63'; Stevanović (yellow card) 67'; Matić (yellow card) 67'	Report (in Serbian)	Balažic (yellow card) 29'; Ninković (yellow card) 82'; Drinčić (yellow card) 85'	Stadium: Stadion Rajko Mitić; Attendance: 10,000; Referee: Vlado Glođović

=== UEFA Champions League ===
==== Second qualifying round ====
15 July 2014 QR2	Partizan (Serbia)	3–0	(Faroe Islands) HB Tórshavn	Belgrade, Serbia
20:45 CET	Lazović 14', 64'; Škuletić 71'	Report	Benjaminsen (yellow card) 55'; Alex dos Santos (yellow card) 86'	Stadium: Stadion Partizana; Attendance: 11,758; Referee: Sven Bindels (Luxembourg)

22 July 2014 QR2	HB Tórshavn (Faroe Islands)	1–3 (1–6 agg.)	(Serbia) Partizan	Tórshavn, Faroe Islands
20:00 CET	Wardum 35'; Edmundsson (yellow card) 72'; Benjaminsen (yellow card) 78'	Report	B.Ilić (yellow card) 48'; Ninković 49'; Lazović 75' (yellow card) 78'; Grbić 90+1'	Stadium: Gundadalur Stadium; Attendance: 1,151; Referee: Dimitar Meckarovski (Macedonia)

==== Third qualifying round ====
30 July 2014 QR3	Ludogorets Razgrad (Bulgaria)	0–0	(Serbia) Partizan	Razgrad, Bulgaria
20:00 CET	Moti (yellow card) 50'; Abalo (yellow card) 58'; Bezjak (yellow card) 78'	Report	Brašanac (yellow card) 10'; S. Ilić (yellow card) 55'; Lukač (yellow card) 72'	Stadium: Ludogorets Arena; Attendance: 5,530; Referee: Kenn Hansen (Denmark)

6 August 2014 QR3	Partizan (Serbia)	2–2 (2 – 2 a agg.)	(Bulgaria) Ludogorets Razgrad	Belgrade, Serbia
20:00 CET	Škuletić 30', 35'; Trajković (red card) 41'; S. Ilić (yellow card) 43'; Volkov (yellow card) 45+2'	Report	Marcelinho 19', 21' (yellow card) 32'; Bezjak (yellow card) 43'; Aleksandrov (yellow card) 63'; Espinho (yellow card) 90+3'	Stadium: Stadion Partizana; Attendance: 18,504; Referee: Aleksei Kulbakov (Belarus)

=== UEFA Europa League ===
==== Play-off round ====
21 August 2014 Play-off round	Partizan (Serbia)	3–2	(Azerbaijan) Neftchi Baku	Belgrade, Serbia
20:15 CET	Denis 29' (o.g.); Grbić (yellow card) 19' (goal) 32'; Ninković (yellow card) 31'; Ninković (yellow card) 45'; Drinčić (yellow card) 65'; Yunuszade 69' (o.g.); Fofana (yellow card) 90'	Report	Flavinho (yellow card) 7'; Bruno (yellow card) 53'; Denis 11', 17'	Stadium: Stadion Partizana; Attendance: 10,177; Referee: Hüseyin Göçek (Turkey)

28 August 2014 Play-off round	Neftchi Baku (Azerbaijan)	1–2 (3–5 agg.)	(Serbia) Partizan	Baku, Azerbaijan
18:00 CET	Wobay 58' (yellow card) 70'; Nfor (yellow card) 45+1' (yellow-red card) 86'; Ramos (yellow card) 48' (red card) 90+3'; Cauê (red card) 90+4'	Report	Škuletić 24', 90+2' (red card) 90+4'; Vulićević (yellow card) 62'	Stadium: Bakcell Arena; Attendance: 22,350; Referee: Robert Schörgenhofer (Austria)

==== Group stage ====
Pos	Team	Pld	W	D	L	GF	GA	GD	Pts	Qualification	BES	TOT	AT	PAR
1	(Turkey) Beşiktaş	6	3	3	0	11	5	+6	12	Advance to knockout phase	—	1–0	1–1	2–1
2	(England) Tottenham Hotspur	6	3	2	1	9	4	+5	11	Advance to knockout phase	1–1	—	5–1	1–0
3	(Greece) Asteras Tripolis	6	1	3	2	7	10	−3	6		2–2	1–2	—	2–0
4	(Serbia) Partizan	6	0	2	4	1	9	−8	2		0–4	0–0	0–0	—

Source: Soccerway
Rules for classification: Group stage tiebreakers

18 September 2014 1	Partizan (Serbia)	0–0	(England) Tottenham Hotspur	Belgrade, Serbia
19:00 CET	B. Ilić (yellow card) 55'; Luka (yellow card) 86'	Report (in English)	Townsend (yellow card) 34'; Davies (yellow card) 48'	Stadium: Stadion Partizana; Attendance: 22,112; Referee: Alon Yefet (Israel)

2 October 2014 2	Asteras Tripolis (Greece)	2–0	(Serbia) Partizan	Tripoli, Greece
21:05 CET	Usero 55'; Parra 66'; Goian (yellow card) 90+1'; Barrales (yellow card) 90+3'	Report (in English)	B. Ilić (yellow card) 15'; Lazović (yellow card) 50'; Vulićević (yellow card) 61'; Ninković (yellow card) 89'	Stadium: Theodoros Kolokotronis Stadium; Attendance: 3,601; Referee: Danny Makkelie (Dutch)

23 October 2014 3	Partizan (Serbia)	0–4	(Turkey) Beşiktaş	Belgrade, Serbia
21:05 CET	Volkov (yellow card) 42'; B. Ilić (yellow card) 75'	Report (in English)	Şahan (yellow card) 14'; Kavlak 18'; Motta (yellow card) 31'; Ba 45'; Özyakup 52'; Töre 54'	Stadium: Stadion Partizana; Attendance: 17,500; Referee: Paolo Mazzoleni (Italy)

6 November 2014 4	Beşiktaş (Turkey)	2–1	(Serbia) Partizan	Istanbul, Turkey
19:00 CET	Kavlak (yellow card) 14'; Ba 57' (pen.), 62'	Report (in English)	Volkov (yellow card) 28'; Stanković (yellow card) 56'; Marković (yellow card) 60' (goal) 78'; Stevanović (yellow card) 79'; Lazović (yellow card) 80'	Stadium: Atatürk Olympic Stadium; Attendance: 11,938; Referee: Alexandru Tudor (Romania)

27 November 2014 5	Tottenham Hotspur (England)	1–0	(Serbia) Partizan	London, England
21:05 CET	Stambouli 49' (yellow card) 51'	Report (in English)	Grbić (yellow card) 72'; B. Ilić (yellow card) 86'	Stadium: White Hart Lane; Attendance: 28,362; Referee: Yevhen Aranovskiy (Ukraine)

11 December 2014 6	Partizan (Serbia)	0–0	(Greece) Asteras Tripolis	Belgrade, Serbia
19:00 CET	Drinčić (yellow card) 47'; B. Ilić (yellow card) 54'; Volkov (yellow card) 60'; Luka (yellow card) 90+3'	Report (in English)	Bakasetas (yellow card) 22'; Tié Bi (yellow card) 33'; Tsokanis (yellow card) 82'	Stadium: Stadion Partizana; Attendance: 6,750; Referee: Paweł Gil (Poland)

=== Friendlies ===
22 June 2014 Friendly	FK Lovćen (Montenegro)	0–2	(Serbia) Partizan	Užice
18:00		Report	Volkov 24'; Ninković 58'	Stadium: Užice City Stadium; Attendance: 1,000; Referee: Jovanetić Boško (Serbia)

27 June 2014 Friendly	Partizan (Serbia)	3–3	(Sweden) Malmö FF	Belgrade
20:45	Pantić 36'; Vulićević 50'; Ilić 90+2' (pen.)	Report	Rosenberg 3'; Molins 6'; Ostojić 24' (o.g.)	Stadium: Partizan Stadium; Attendance: 3,000; Referee: Milenko Vukadinovic (Serbia)

1 July 2014 Friendly	SK Sturm Graz (Austria)	0–1	(Serbia) Partizan	Markt Hartmannsdorf, Austria
18:45		Report	Živković 50'	Stadium: Rittscheintalstadion; Attendance: / Referee: Aleksandar Harkam (Austria)

4 July 2014 Friendly	Petrolul Ploiești (Romania)	1–0	(Serbia) Partizan	Pohorje, Slovenia
18:00	Mutu 29'	Report		Stadium: Play green football kamp Attendance: 200; Referee: Alen Borošak (Slovenia)

6 July 2014 Friendly	Rubin Kazan (Russia)	0–0	(Serbia) Partizan	Globasnitz, Austria
17:00		Report		Stadium: Sportanlage Globasnitz; Attendance: 100; Referee: Rado Kmetec (Slovenia)

8 July 2014 Friendly	Partizan (Serbia)	3–0	(Slovenia) ND Dravinja	Pohorje, Slovenia
11:00	Ismaël Béko Fofana 3'; Luka 14', 62'	Report		Stadium: teren 2 sportskog centra na Pohorju; Attendance: 100; Referee: Sano Veselič (Slovenia)

8 July 2014 Friendly	Partizan (Serbia)	3–1	(Slovenia) ND Gorica	Ptuj, Slovenia
18:00	Lazović 3'; Ninković 83'; Grbić 87'	Report	Vetrih 86' (pen.)	Stadium: Mestni stadion Attendance: 100; Referee: Roman Glazar (Slovenia)

16 July 2014 Friendly	Partizan	1–0	Zemun	Belgrade
10:30	Ismaël Béko Fofana 90'	Report		Stadium: Zemunelo; Attendance: 100; Referee: Momčilo Marković (Serbia)

6 September 2014 Friendly	Donji Srem	4–3	Partizan	Pećinci
16:30	Spalević 14'; Stanisavljević 18'; Zec 45'; Marčeta 85'	Report	Ismaël Béko Fofana 30', 64'; Ćirković 37'	Stadium: Suvača Sportcenter; Attendance: 1,000; Referee: Ilija Brdar

10 October 2014 Friendly	VGSK	0–1	Partizan	Veliko Gradište
15:30		Report	Kojić 74'	Stadium: Stadion FK "VGSK"; Attendance: 1,500

23 January 2015 Friendly	Dynamo Moscow (Russia)	4–1	(Serbia) Partizan	Belek, Turkey
15:30	Valbuena 4'; Kokorin 14'; Zobnin 69'; Kurányi 81' (pen.)	Report	Babović 75' (pen.)	Stadium: Susesi Football Field; Referee: Kenan Ine (Turkey)

27 January 2015 Friendly	Partizan (Serbia)	2–2	(Switzerland) FC Zürich	Belek, Turkey
14:30	Ninković 30'; Kojić 48' (pen.)	Report	Sadiku 4' (pen.); Ćirković 24' (o.g.)	Stadium: Susesi Football Field; Referee: Szymon Marciniak, (Poland)

29 January 2015 Friendly	Austria Wien	4–1	(Serbia) Partizan	Belek, Turkey
15:30	Gorgon 3', 5'; Royer 25'; Larsen 88'	Report	Škuletić 49'	Stadium: Gloria Sports ground Referee: Jaroslav Przybyt, (Poland)

4 February 2015 Friendly	Partizan	5–0	Sinđelić	Belgrade
11:00	Radulović 15' (o.g.); Ninković 41' (pen.); Kojić 56'; Marinković 59'; Šaponjić 67'	Report		Stadium: Zemunelo; Referee: Momčilo Marković (Serbia)

7 February 2015 Friendly	Sarajevo (Bosnia and Herzegovina)	1–0	(Serbia) Partizan	Belek, Turkey
16:30	Benko 88'	Report		Stadium: Hotel Miracle Sports ground Referee: Georgij Vodočkorija (Georgia)

8 February 2015 Friendly	Partizan (Serbia)	2–2	(Russia) Anzhi Makhachkala	Belek, Turkey
16:00	Ninković 17' (pen.); Marinković 36'	Report	Leonardo 22' 38' (pen.)	Stadium: Hotel Riu Kaya Sports ground Referee: Asimov Aziz (Uzbekistan)

10 February 2015 Friendly	Partizan (Serbia)	1–2	(Bulgaria) PFC Litex Lovech	Belek, Turkey
14:00	Ćirković 78'	Report	Cvetkov 65'; Popov 83'	Stadium: Susesi Football Field; Referee: Gorkom Kargiage (Turkey)

12 February 2015 Friendly	Maribor (Slovenia)	1–2	(Serbia) Partizan	Belek, Turkey
18:00 CET	Ibraimi 29' (pen.)	Report	Bogosavac 9'; Šaponjić 47'	Stadium: Susesi Football Field; Referee: Ahmet Esref Sari (Turkey)

13 February 2015 Friendly	Partizan (Serbia)	4–0	(Hungary) Győr	Belek, Turkey
18:00	Babović 33' (pen.), 63' (pen.); Drinčić 60'; Ninković 86'	Report		Stadium: Papillon sports centre Referee: Gabor Olah (Hungary)

6 May 2015 Friendly	Partizan	6–1	Srem Jakovo	Belgrade
11:00	Kojić 7', 20'; Luka 11'; Đurić 28'; Marković 30'; Rudan 61'	Report	Mrdaković 27'	Stadium: Zemunelo

== Statistics ==
=== Goalscorers ===
This includes all competitive matches. The list is sorted by shirt number when total goals are equal.

Rank	No.	Pos	Nat	Name	Serbian SuperLiga	Serbian Cup	Europe	Total
1	32	FW	(Serbia)	Petar Škuletić	14	2	5	21
2	27	FW	(Serbia)	Danko Lazović	9	0	3	12
3	17	RW/RM	(Serbia)	Andrija Živković	5	2	0	7
4	33	MF	(Serbia)	Nikola Ninković	4	1	1	6
4	14	RW/RM	(Montenegro)	Petar Grbić	2	1	2	5
4	33	FW	(Serbia)	Ivan Šaponjić	4	1	0	5
5	21	DM/CM	(Serbia)	Saša Marković	2	1	1	4
5	30	CB/RB	(Slovenia)	Branko Ilić	4	0	0	4
5	3	LB	(Montenegro)	Vladimir Volkov	4	0	0	4
5	10	FW	(Ivory Coast)	Ismaël Béko Fofana	2	1	0	3
6	22	CM/AM	(Serbia)	Saša Ilić (captain)	3	0	0	3
6	10	CM/AM	(Serbia)	Stefan Babović	2	0	0	2
6	9	ST / CF	(Serbia)	Nemanja Kojić	2	0	0	2
6	18	DM/CM	(Montenegro)	Nikola Drinčić	2	0	0	2
6	8	DM/CM	(Serbia)	Darko Brašanac	1	1	0	2
7	7	MF	(Serbia)	Predrag Luka	2	0	0	2
8	29	RW	(Serbia)	Nenad Marinković	1	0	0	1
TOTALS					63	10	12	85

Last Updated: 4 June 2015
Source: Competitive matches

=== Assists ===
This includes all competitive matches. The list is sorted by shirt number when total assists are equal.

No.	Pos	Nat	Player	Serbian SuperLiga	Serbian Cup	Europe	Total
27	FW	(Serbia)	Danko Lazović	5	0	3	8
32	FW	(Serbia)	Petar Škuletić	6	0	1	7
11	MF	(Serbia)	Nikola Ninković	5	2	0	7
14	RW/RM	(Montenegro)	Petar Grbić	5	1	0	6
18	DM/CM	(Montenegro)	Nikola Drinčić	5	0	1	6
22	MF	(Serbia)	Saša Ilić (captain)	5	0	1	6
8	MF	(Serbia)	Darko Brašanac	3	0	3	6
4	RB	(Serbia)	Miroslav Vulićević	4	1	0	5
3	MFLB	(Montenegro)	Vladimir Volkov	4	0	0	4
9	ST / CF	(Serbia)	Nemanja Kojić	4	1	0	5
17	MF	(Serbia)	Andrija Živković	0	1	2	3
33	FW	(Serbia)	Ivan Šaponjić	1	1	0	2
30	CB/RB	(Slovenia)	Branko Ilić	1	0	1	2
6	CB	(Slovenia)	Gregor Balažic	0	1	0	1
7	MF	(Serbia)	Predrag Luka	0	1	0	1
TOTALS				48	9	12	69

=== Disciplinary record ===
As of 7 February 2015

Number	Nation	Position	Name	Total		Serbian SuperLiga		Serbian Cup		Europe	
Number	Nation	Position	Name	Booked	Sent off (straight red)	Booked	Sent off (straight red)	Booked	Sent off (straight red)	Booked	Sent off (straight red)
1	(Serbia)	GK	Živko Živković	0	0	0	0	0	0	0	0
2	(Bulgaria)	DF	Ivan Bandalovski	1	0	1	0	0	0	0	0
3	(Montenegro)	DF	Vladimir Volkov	10	0	6	0	0	0	4	0
4	(Serbia)	DF	Miroslav Vulićević	5	0	3	0	0	0	2	0
5	(Serbia)	DF	Nemanja Petrović	3	0	3	0	0	0	0	0
6	(Slovenia)	DF	Gregor Balažic	3	0	2	0	1	0	0	0
7	(Serbia)	MF	Predrag Luka	2	0	0	0	0	0	2	0
8	(Serbia)	MF	Darko Brašanac	3	0	1	0	1	0	1	0
9	(Serbia)	FW	Nemanja Kojić	2	0	2	0	0	0	0	0
10	(Serbia)	MF	Stefan Babović	1	0	1	0	0	0	0	0
11	(Serbia)	MF	Nikola Ninković	6	1	2	1	1	0	2	0
12	(Serbia)	GK	Filip Kljajić	0	0	0	0	0	0	0	0
13	(Serbia)	DF	Lazar Ćirković	3	0	3	0	0	0	0	0
14	(Montenegro)	MF	Petar Grbić	6	0	3	0	1	0	2	0
17	(Serbia)	MF	Andrija Živković	5	0	5	0	0	0	0	0
18	(Montenegro)	MF	Nikola Drinčić	7	0	4	0	1	0	2	0
19	(Serbia)	DF	Branko Pauljević	0	0	0	0	0	0	0	0
20	(Serbia)	MF	Saša Lukić	0	0	0	0	0	0	0	0
21	(Serbia)	MF	Saša Marković	6	0	3	0	2	0	1	0
22	(Serbia)	MF	Saša Ilić	5	0	3	0	0	0	2	0
25	(Serbia)	GK	Milan Lukač	1	0	0	0	0	0	1	0
27	(Serbia)	FW	Danko Lazović	7	0	3	0	1	0	3	0
28	(Serbia)	MF	Ivan Petrović	0	0	0	0	0	0	0	0
29	(Serbia)	MF	Nenad Marinković	0	0	0	0	0	0	0	0
30	(Slovenia)	DF	Branko Ilić	11	0	4	0	1	0	6	0
32	(Serbia)	FW	Petar Škuletić	2	1	1	0	1	0	0	1
33	(Serbia)	FW	Ivan Šaponjić	3	0	2	0	1	0	0	0
35	(Serbia)	DF	Miladin Stevanović	1	0	0	0	0	0	1	0
40	(Serbia)	DF	Miloš Ostojić	0	0	0	0	0	0	0	0
55	(Serbia)	MF	Danilo Pantić	0	0	0	0	0	0	0	0
			TOTALS	93	2	52	1	11	0	29	1

=== Club world ranking ===
These are the IFFHS club's points as of May 2014: In the "Top 100″ there are clubs from 42 countries: 67 clubs from UEFA, 22 from CONMEBOL, six from AFC, three from CONCACAF, two from CAF and none from OFC. The following leagues are represented by the most clubs in the Top 100 :Spain (7), Argentina (7), Brazil (6), England (6), Germany (6), Italy (6), France (5). Under the global ranking, the Top 10 for each of the football continents, South America, Africa, Asia and CONCACAF and also the TOP 500

P	Club	Points
75	(Argentina) Estudiantes de La Plata	140,000
75	(England) Everton F.C.	140,000
75	(Serbia) FK Partizan	140,000
78	(Azerbaijan) Qarabağ	138,000
79	(Ukraine) FC Shakhtar Donetsk	137,050
80	(Finland) HJK Helsinki	136,050
81	(Greece) Asteras Tripolis	135,000

== See also ==
- List of FK Partizan seasons
- 2014–15 UEFA Champions League
- 2014–15 UEFA Europa League
- 2014–15 Serbian Cup
- 2014–15 Serbian SuperLiga
