= 2013–14 FK Partizan season =

Partizan Belgrade
2013–14 season
- President: Dragan Đurić
- Head coach: Vuk Rašović (until 15 December 2013); Marko Nikolić
- Stadium: Partizan Stadium
- Serbian SuperLiga: 2nd
- Serbian Cup: Quarter-finals
- Champions League: Third qualifying round
- Europa League: Play-off round
- Top goalscorer: League: Nemanja Kojić; Petar Škuletić (7 each); All: Nemanja Kojić (8 goals)
- Highest home attendance: vs Red Star Belgrade (30,000) (26.4.2014)
- Lowest home attendance: vs Metalac (2,000) (25.9.2013)
Home colours	Away colours	Third colours

The 2013–14 season was FK Partizan's 8th season in Serbian SuperLiga. This article shows player statistics and all matches (official and friendly) that the club played in during the season.

== Players ==
=== Squad statistics ===
No.	Name	League		Cup		Europe		Total		Discipline(SL)	
No.	Name	Apps	Goals	Apps	Goals	Apps	Goals	Apps	Goals	Yellow card	Red card
Goalkeepers
1	(Serbia) Živko Živković	4	-3	0	0	0+1	-1	1+1	-4	0	0
25	(Serbia) Milan Lukač	13	-8	0	0	4	-3	8	-8	1	0
30	(Serbia) Nikola Petrović	0	0	0	0	0	0	0	0	0	0
Defenders
3	(Montenegro) Vladimir Volkov	25	2	1	0	3	1	20	3	8	0
4	(Serbia) Miroslav Vulićević	12	0	0	0	0	0	3	0	2	0
5	(Serbia) Nemanja Petrović	3+4	1	2+1	0	1	0	6+5	1	1	0
6	(Serbia) Vojislav Stanković	25+1	1	3	0	3+1	0	20+2	1	3	0
13	(Serbia) Nikola Aksentijević	4	0	0	0	5	0	9	0	0	0
15	(Serbia) Branislav Trajković	22	0	0	0	0	0	4	0	6	1
18	(Serbia) Saša Ivković	0+1	0	0	0	0+1	0	0+2	0	0	0
26	(Serbia) Milan Obradović	22	1	3	0	4	0	25	1	6	1
40	(Serbia) Miloš Ostojić	10	0	2	0	3	0	12+1	0	2	1
Midfielders
7	(Serbia) Predrag Luka	27	4	3	1	2+1	0	12+10	5	2	0
8	(Serbia) Darko Brašanac	18	2	1	0	0+2	0	6+5	2	6	0
11	(Serbia) Nikola Ninković	19	2	2	2	4+1	0	17+3	4	5	2
17	(Serbia) Andrija Živković	23	5	1	0	0+1	0	11+5	5	4	0
20	(Montenegro) Nikola Drinčić	13	3	0	0	0	0	4	3	1	0
21	(Serbia) Saša Marković	11	1	2+1	0	6	1	14+2	1	3	0
22	(Serbia) Saša Ilić (c)	26	5	0+2	0	7	0	18+7	5	3	0
24	(Montenegro) Petar Grbić	9	0	1+1	0	3+1	0	5+7	0	1	0
29	(Serbia) Filip Malbašić	10+1	2	1	0	2+3	0	13+4	2	5	1
36	(Serbia) Nikola Gulan	10	0	2	0	2	0	10+2	0	2	0
55	(Serbia) Danilo Pantić	10	1	0	0	0	0	0+3	1	0	0
Forwards
9	(Serbia) Nemanja Kojić	15	7	1+1	1	1+2	0	8+8	8	0	0
10	(Ivory Coast) Beko Fofana	7+3	3	1+1	1	0	0	7+5	5	1	0
27	(Serbia) Danko Lazovic	10	6	0	0	0	0	10	6	2	1
32	(Serbia) Petar Škuletić	14	7	0	0	0	0	14	7	0	0
33	(Serbia) Ivan Šaponjić	0+1	0	0	0	0	0	0+1	0	0	0
Players sold or loaned out during the season
15	(Bulgaria) Ivan Ivanov	0	0	0	0	3	0	3	0	0	0
44	(Serbia) Marko Šćepović	0	0	0	0	2+2	0	2+2	0	0	0
45	(Serbia) Aleksandar Mitrović	1+2	3	0	0	3	0	4+2	3	1	0
99	(Cameroon) Eric Djemba-Djemba	9+2	0	1+1	0	2+1	0	12+4	0	0	0
2	(Serbia) Marko Živković	7	-1	1	0	0	0	8	-1	2	0
88	(Serbia) Vladimir Stojković	14	-9	3	-2	2	-3	19	-14	1	0
39	(Serbia) Miloš Jojić	14+1	6	2+1	0	5	1	21+2	7	1	0

=== Top scorers ===
Includes all competitive matches. The list is sorted by shirt number when total goals are equal.

Position	Nation	Number	Name	League	Cup	Europe	Total
1	(Serbia)	9	Kojić	7	1	0	8
2	(Serbia)	32	Škuletić	7	0	0	7
2	(Serbia)	39	Jojić	6	0	1	7
4	(Serbia)	27	Lazović	6	0	0	6
5	(Serbia)	22	Ilić	5	0	0	5
5	(Serbia)	17	Živković	5	0	0	5

== Transfers ==
=== In ===
Date	Position	Name	From	Type
13 June 2013	DF	(Serbia) Nemanja Petrović	(Serbia) Teleoptik	Sign
13 June 2013	DF	(Serbia) Saša Ivković	(Serbia) Teleoptik	Sign
19 June 2013	GK	(Serbia) Milan Lukač	(Serbia) OFK Beograd	Transfer
20 June 2013	DF	(Serbia) Nikola Aksentijević	(Netherlands) Vitesse Arnhem	Loan
28 June 2013	MF	(Serbia) Nikola Gulan	(Italy) Fiorentina	Transfer
28 June 2013	MF	(Serbia) Filip Malbašić	(Germany) Hoffenheim	Loan
13 July 2013	FW	(Montenegro) Petar Grbić	(Greece) Olympiacos	Loan
23 July 2013	DF	(Serbia) Milan Obradovic	(Ukraine) Metalist	Transfer
23 July 2013	MF	(Cameroon) Eric Djemba-Djemba	(Israel) Hapoel T.A.	Transfer
6 August 2013	FW	(Ivory Coast) Beko Fofana	(Armenia) Shirak	Transfer
23 August 2013	MF	(Serbia) Andrija Živković	Promoted from youth squad	Sign
19 November 2013	FW	(Serbia) Ivan Šaponjić	Promoted from youth squad	Sign
5 December 2013	MF	(Serbia) Danilo Pantić	Promoted from youth squad	Sign
20 December 2013	MF	(Montenegro) Nikola Drinčić	(Russia) Krasnodar	Transfer
24 December 2013	DF	(Serbia) Miroslav Vulićević	(Serbia) Vojvodina	Transfer
10 January 2014	FW	(Serbia) Petar Škuletić	(Serbia) Vojvodina	Transfer
10 January 2014	DF	(Serbia) Branislav Trajković	(Serbia) Vojvodina	Transfer
20 January 2014	FW	(Serbia) Danko Lazovic	(Russia) Zenit	Transfer
14 February 2014	GK	(Serbia) Filip Kljajić	(Serbia) Rad	Transfer

=== Out ===
Date	Position	Name	To	Type
29 Mаy 2013	MF	(Serbia) Milan Smiljanić	(Turkey) Gençlerbirliği	Transfer
2 June 2013	DF	(Montenegro) Žarko Tomašević	(Belgium) Kortrijk	Transfer
5 June 2013	MF	(Serbia) Goran Lovre	(Iran) Esteghlal	Transfer
10 June 2013	MF	(Serbia) Lazar Marković	(Portugal) Benfica	Transfer
10 June 2013	MF	(Serbia) Filip Marković	(Portugal) Benfica B	Transfer
21 June 2013	DF	(Serbia) Aleksandar Miljkovic	(Portugal) Braga	Transfer
21 June 2013	DF	(North Macedonia) Aleksandar Lazevski	(Ukraine) Hoverla	Transfer
1 July 2013	DF	(North Macedonia) Stefan Aškovski	(Serbia) Donji Srem	Loan
13 July 2013	FW	(Serbia) Stefan Šćepović	(Spain) Sporting de Gijon	Loan
15 July 2013	MF	(Brazil) Eliomar	(Hungary) Kecskeméti	Loan
21 July 2013	DF	(Serbia) Branko Pauljević	(Serbia) Radnički Niš	Loan
23 July 2013	FW	(Serbia) Filip Knežević	(Serbia) Radnički 1923	Loan
3 August 2013	FW	(Serbia) Nikola Trujić	(Serbia) Napredak	Transfer
7 August 2013	DF	(Bulgaria) Ivan Ivanov	(Switzerland) Basel	Transfer
30 August 2013	FW	(Serbia) Aleksandar Mitrović	(Belgium) Anderlecht	Transfer
2 September 2013	FW	(Serbia) Marko Šćepović	(Greece) Olympiacos	Transfer
2 September 2013	MF	(Serbia) Dejan Babić	(Serbia) Sloboda Užice	Loan
23 December 2013	MF	(Cameroon) Eric Djemba-Djemba	Unattached	Released
11 January 2014	DF	(North Macedonia) Stefan Aškovski	(Serbia) Napredak	Loan
24 January 2014	DF	(Serbia) Marko Živković	(Serbia) Vojvodina	Transfer
25 January 2014	GK	(Serbia) Vladimir Stojković	(Greece) Ergotelis	Released
31 January 2014	MF	(Serbia) Miloš Jojić	(Germany) Dortmund	Transfer
14 February 2014	GK	(Serbia) Filip Kljajić	(Serbia) Teleoptik	Loan

For recent transfers, see List of Serbian football transfers summer 2013 and List of Serbian football transfers winter 2013-14.

== Competitions ==
=== Overview ===
Competition	Record							
Competition	P	W	D	L	GF	GA	GD	Win %
Superliga	30	22	5	3	64	20	+44	73.33
Serbian Cup	3	2	0	1	5	2	+3	66.67
UEFA Europa League	6	1	2	3	3	7	−4	16.67
Total	39	25	7	7	72	29	+43	64.10

	Competition	Position
(Serbia)	Serbian SuperLiga	2nd
(Serbia)	Serbian Cup	Quarter finals
(European Union)	UEFA Champions League	Third qualifying round
(European Union)	UEFA Europa League	Play-off round

=== Serbian SuperLiga ===
==== League table ====
Pos	Team	Pld	W	D	L	GF	GA	GD	Pts	Qualification or relegation
1	Red Star Belgrade (C, D)	30	23	3	4	66	27	+39	72	Excluded from European competitions (Note: Red Star Belgrade, the champions of the 2013–14 Serbian SuperLiga, would have qualified for the Champions League second qualifying round, but was banned by UEFA for breaching UEFA Club Licensing and Financial Fair Play Regulations. As a result, the Partizan, the runners-up of the league, entered the Champions League instead of the Europa League second qualifying round and Jagodina, the third-placed team of the league, entered the Europa League second qualifying round instead of the first qualifying round, and the first qualifying round berth was given to Čukarički, the fifth-placed team of the league.)
2	Partizan (Q)	30	22	5	3	64	20	+44	71	Qualification for Champions League second qualifying round
3	Jagodina (Q)	30	13	9	8	40	30	+10	48	Qualification for Europa League second qualifying round (Note: Vojvodina won the 2013–14 Serbian Cup, therefore qualified for the second qualifying round of the 2014–15 UEFA Europa League)
4	Vojvodina (Q)	30	11	12	7	38	32	+6	45	Qualification for Europa League second qualifying round
5	Čukarički (Q)	30	12	8	10	30	31	−1	44	Qualification for Europa League first qualifying round

Source: Serbian SuperLiga
Rules for classification: 1) points; 2) head-to-head points; 3) head-to-head goal difference; 4) head-to-head goals scored; 5) goal difference; 6) number of goals scored.
(C) Champions; (D) Disqualified; (Q) Qualified for the phase indicated

==== Results and positions by round ====
Round	1	2	3	4	5	6	7	8	9	10	11	12	13	14	15	16	17	18	19	20	21	22	23	24	25	26	27	28	29	30
Ground	H	A	H	H	A	H	A	H	A	H	A	H	A	H	A	A	H	A	A	H	A	H	A	H	A	H	A	H	A	H
Result	W	D	W	W	W	W	L	D	W	D	L	W	W	W	W	D	W	W	W	W	W	D	W	W	L	W	W	W	W	W
Position	4	4	2	1	1	1	1	1	1	1	1	1	1	1	1	2	2	2	2	2	2	2	2	2	2	2	2	2	2	2

Updated to match(es) played on 10 June 2014. Source: superliga.rs
A = Away; H = Home; W = Win; D = Draw; L = Loss

==== Matches ====
10 August 2013 1	Partizan	4–3	Novi Pazar	Belgrade
19:00 CET	Jojić 20'; Mitrović 52' (pen.), 56'; Luka 88'	Report	Vidaković 17'; Kecap 34'; Mutavdžić 72'	Stadium: Stadion Partizana; Attendance: 5,000; Referee: Vladimir Nedeljković

17 August 2013 2	Radnički Niš	0–0	Partizan	Niš
19:00 CET		Report		Stadium: Čair; Attendance: 13,441; Referee: Vlado Glodjović

24 August 2013 3	Partizan	5–1	Radnički 1923	Belgrade
19:00 CET	Fofana 17'; Volkov 35'; Ninković 51'; A.Živković 83'; Mitrović 89'	Report	Marić 83'	Stadium: Stadion Partizana; Attendance: 5,000; Referee: Ninoslav Spasić

31 August 2013 4	Partizan	3–1	Rad	Belgrade
19:00 CET	Fofana 11'; A.Živković 60'; Ilić 74'	Report	Rodić 53'	Stadium: Stadion Partizana; Attendance: 3,000; Referee: Danilo Grujić

14 September 2013 5	Sloboda Užice	1–2	Partizan	Užice
16:30 CET	Pilipović 83'	Report	A.Živković 48'; Kojić 81'	Stadium: Gradski Stadion Užice; Attendance: 8,000; Referee: Milorad Mažić

21 September 2013 6	Partizan	2–0	OFK Beograd	Belgrade
19:00 CET	Ilić 43'; A.Živković 75'	Report		Stadium: Stadion Partizana; Attendance: 4,000; Referee: Miodrag Gogić

29 September 2013 7	Vojvodina	2–1	Partizan	Novi Sad
17:00 CET	Škuletić 73'; M.Živković 88' (o.g.)	Report	Kojić 76'	Stadium: Karađorđe; Attendance: 5,000; Referee: Boško Jovanetić

5 October 2013 8	Partizan	0–0	Javor	Belgrade
19:00 CET		Report		Stadium: Stadion Partizana; Attendance: 11,370; Referee: Majo Vujović

20 October 2013 9	Jagodina	0–3	Partizan	Jagodina
15:00 CET		Report	Jojić 34'; Nemanja Petrović 51'; Kojić 84'	Stadium: Gradski Stadion Jagodina; Attendance: 4,000; Referee: Milorad Mažić

26 October 2013 10	Partizan	1–1	Napredak	Belgrade
17:00 CET	Luka 88'	Report	Trujić 47'	Stadium: Stadion Partizana; Attendance: 5,000; Referee: Aleksandar Vasić

2 November 2013 11	Red Star	1–0	Partizan	Belgrade
18:00 CET	Obradović 18' (o.g.)	Report		Stadium: Marakana; Attendance: 40,034; Referee: Milorad Mažić

9 November 2013 12	Partizan	3–2	Donji Srem	Belgrade
17:00 CET	Fofana 58'; Stanković 70'; Jojić 82'	Report	Krunić 43', 47'	Stadium: Stadion Partizana; Attendance: / Referee: Darko Bogdanović

23 November 2013 13	Voždovac	0–1	Partizan	Belgrade
13:00 CET		Report	Jojić 35'	Stadium: Stadion Obilić; Attendance: / Referee: Miodrag Gogić

30 November 2013 14	Partizan	2–0	Spartak ZV	Belgrade
15:00 CET	Jojić 51', 60' (pen.)	Report		Stadium: Stadion Partizana; Attendance: / Referee: Dejan Dimitrijević

7 December 2013 15	Čukarički	0–1	Partizan	Belgrade
13:00 CET		Report	Brašanac 62'	Stadium: Stadion Čukarički; Attendance: 2,000; Referee: Bojan Nikolić

23 February 2014 16	Novi Pazar	0–0	Partizan	Novi Pazar
13:30 CET		Report		Stadium: Gradski Stadion; Attendance: 8,000; Referee: Ninoslav Spasić

1 March 2014 17	Partizan	2–1	Radnički Niš	Belgrade
17:00 CET	Malbašić 31'; Ninković 86'	Report	Petrović 9'	Stadium: Stadion Partizana; Attendance: 15,124; Referee: Novica Anđelovski

8 March 2014 18	Radnički 1923	0–5	Partizan	Kragujevac
14:30 CET		Report	Malbašić 3'; Škuletić 38', 90'; Drinčić 58'; Lazović 64' (pen.)	Stadium: Čika Dača; Attendance: 7,000; Referee: Vlado Glodjović

16 March 2014 19	Rad	2–4	Partizan	Belgrade
14:30 CET	Ožegović 73'; Injac 77'	Report	Drinčić 11'; A.Živković 45+2'; Brašanac 79'; Škuletić 90+5'	Stadium: Stadion Obilić; Attendance: 3,000; Referee: Marko Popović

22 March 2014 20	Partizan	1–0	Sloboda Užice	Belgrade
17:00 CET	Ilić 83'.	Report		Stadium: Stadion Partizana; Attendance: 12,537; Referee: Dejan Dimitrijević

30 March 2014 21	OFK Beograd	0–2	Partizan	Belgrade
14:30 CET		Report	Vasiljević 45+3' (o.g.); Saša Ilić 56'.	Stadium: Omladinski stadion Attendance: 4,500; Referee: Milorad Mažić

5 April 2014 22	Partizan	1–1	Vojvodina	Belgrade
18:00 CET	Obradović 57'.	Report	Milinković-Savić 90+1' (pen.).	Stadium: Stadion Partizana; Attendance: 7,000; Referee: Bogdanović Darko

12 April 2014 23	Javor	0–1	Partizan	Ivanjica
16:00 CET		Report	Lazović 45+1'.	Stadium: Stadion Ivanjica; Attendance: 2,000; Referee: Glodović Vlado

17 April 2014 24	Partizan	2–0	Jagodina	Belgrade
18:00 CET	Saša Ilić 53'; Škuletić 77'.	Report		Stadium: Stadion Partizana; Attendance: 3,000; Referee: Vujović Majo

22 April 2014 25	Napredak	2–0	Partizan	Kruševac
16:00 CET	Vidaković 31'; Bojan Božović 73'.	Report		Stadium: Mladost Stadium (Kruševac); Attendance: 8,000; Referee: Anđelovski Novica

26 April 2014 26	Partizan	2–1	Red Star	Belgrade
19:00 CET	Drinčić 27'; Kojić 90'.	Report	Ninković (penalty missed) 24'; Mijailović (penalty missed) 33'; Mrdja 56'.	Stadium: Stadion Partizana; Attendance: 30,000; Referee: Milorad Mažić

3 May 2014 27	Donji Srem	0–5	Partizan	Novi Sad
19:00 CET		Report	Lazović 6'; Škuletić 41'; Kojić 70', 78', 88'.	Stadium: Karađorđe Stadium; Attendance: 3,000; Referee: Jovanetić Boško

10 May 2014 28	Partizan	5–0	Voždovac	Belgrade
20:00 CET	Volkov 27'; Škuletić 39' (pen.), 64'; Lazović 56'; Luka 69'.	Report		Stadium: Stadion Partizana; Attendance: 3,500; Referee: Popović Marko

25 May 2014 29	Spartak ZV	1–4	Partizan	Subotica
17:00 CET	V.Kovačević 55'.	Report	Lazović 21' (pen.); Luka 45'; D.Pantić 71'; S.Marković 83'.	Stadium: Subotica City Stadium; Attendance: 2,500; Referee: Nenad Đokić

28 May 2014 30	Partizan	2–0	Čukarički	Belgrade
17:00 CET	Lazović 73'; Fofana 90+3'.	Report		Stadium: Stadion Partizana; Attendance: 5,000; Referee: Dejan Santrač

=== Serbian Cup ===
25 September 2013 R1	Partizan	2–0	Metalac	Belgrade
17:00 CET	Fofana 34'; Kojić 70'	Report		Stadium: Stadion Partizana; Attendance: 2,000; Referee: Novica Anđelovski

30 October 2013 R2	Radnički Niš	0–3	Partizan	Niš
17:00 CET		Report	Luka 7'; Ninković 49', 73'	Stadium: Čair; Attendance: 13,000; Referee: Boško Jovanetić

4 December 2013 QF	Spartak ZV	2–0	Partizan	Subotica
13:00 CET	Šarac 11'; Nosković 15'	Report		Stadium: Gradski Stadion; Attendance: 2,000; Referee: Danilo Grujić

=== UEFA Champions League ===
==== Qualifying phase ====
17 July 2013 2nd qualifying round 1st leg	Shirak (Armenia)	1–1	(Serbia) Partizan	Gyumri, Armenia
15:00 CET	Hakobyan 47'	Report	Volkov 90+2'	Stadium: Gyumri City Stadium, Gyumri; Attendance: 2,860; Referee: Libor Kovařík (Czech Republic)

24 July 2013 2nd qualifying round 2nd leg	Partizan (Serbia)	0–0 (1–1 (a) agg.)	(Armenia) Shirak	Belgrade, Serbia
20:45 CET		Report		Stadium: Partizan Stadium, Belgrade; Attendance: 15,742; Referee: Ioannis Anastasiou (Cyprus)

31 July 2013 3rd qualifying round 1st leg	Ludogorets (Bulgaria)	2–1	(Serbia) Partizan	Razgrad, Bulgaria
19:30 CET	Marcelinho 54'; Aleksandrov 65'	Report	S. Marković 49'	Stadium: Ludogorets Arena, Razgrad; Attendance: 7,000; Referee: Michael Koukoulakis (Greece)

6 August 2013 3rd qualifying round 2nd leg	Partizan (Serbia)	0–1 (1–3 agg.)	(Bulgaria) Ludogorets	Belgrade, Serbia
20:45 CET		Report	Zlatinski 88' (pen.)	Stadium: Partizan Stadium, Belgrade; Attendance: 22,312; Referee: Alan Kelly (Ireland)

=== UEFA Europa League ===
==== Play-off round ====
22 August 2013 Play-off Round 1st leg	Partizan (Serbia)	1–0	(Switzerland) Thun	Belgrade, Serbia
20:30 CET	Jojić 70'	Report		Stadium: Partizan Stadium, Belgrade; Attendance: 15,000; Referee: Serhiy Boyko (Ukraine)

29 August 2013 Play-off Round 2nd leg	Thun (Switzerland)	3–0 (3–1 agg.)	(Serbia) Partizan	Thun, Switzerland
20:00 CET	C.Schneuwly 15'; M.Schneuwly 48'; Zuffi 75'	Report		Stadium: Arena Thun, Thun; Attendance: 8,150; Referee: Daniele Orsato (Italy)

=== Friendlies ===
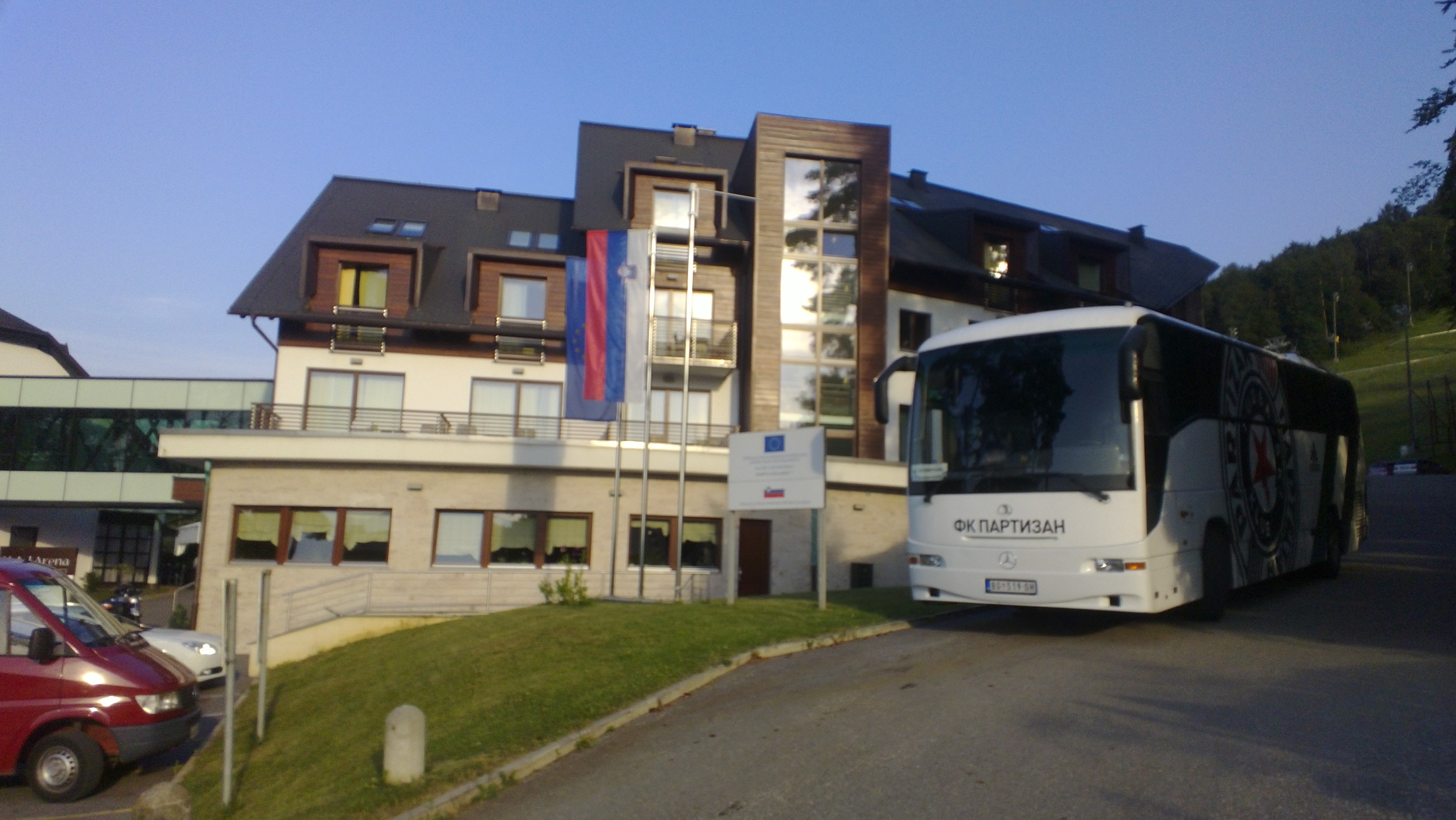
Hotel Arena in Maribor, Slovenia is the traditional summer base where Partizan is preparing during mid-seasons.

Date	Opponents	Result	Scorers
21 June 2013	(Serbia) Zlatibor Okrug	4–0	Ilić 12', Pantić 50', A.Živković 51', S.Šćepović 67'.
27 June 2013	(Russia) Lokomotiv Moscow	0–1	
30 June 2013	(Romania) Petrolul Ploiești	1–0	Luka 36'.
3 July 2013	(Ukraine) Metalist Kharkiv	2–2	Ninkovic 12', 34'
24 January 2014	(Austria) WAC	2–1	Lazović 36', Ilić 76'.
27 January 2014	(South Korea) Gyeongnam	2–1	Mutombo 14', Pantić 75'.
30 January 2014	(Bulgaria) Litex	2–3	Luka 54', Marković 80'.
4 February 2014	(Serbia) Hajduk Lion	4–0	Ne. Petrović 22', Škuletić 71', Malbašić 79',84'.
8 February 2014	(Slovakia) Ružomberok	1–0	Škuletić 58'.
9 February 2014	(Bosnia and Herzegovina) Sarajevo	1–0	Ninković 81'.
11 February 2014	(Slovenia) Maribor	4–0	Škuletić 6',74' Mertelj (o.g.) 26', Malbašić 28'.
12 February 2014	(North Macedonia) Rabotnički	2–0	Ninković 55',65'.
14 February 2014	(Ukraine) Shakhtar	0–1	

==== Generali Deyna Cup 2013 ====
6 July 2013 1/2	Legia (Poland)	2–1	(Serbia) Partizan	Warsaw, Poland
18:00 CET	Saganowski 45'; Kucharczyk 78'	Report	M.Šćepović 81'	Stadium: Pepsi Arena, Warsaw; Attendance: 10,000; Referee: Marcin Borski (Poland)

7 July 2013 3rd	Austria Wien	2–1	(Serbia) Partizan	Warsaw, Poland
13:00 CET	A.Grünwald 80'; Hosiner 90+1'	Report	M.Šćepović 64'	Stadium: Pepsi Arena, Warsaw; Attendance: 2,000; Referee: Pavel Raskovski (Poland)

== Sponsors ==
Kit sponsors
- Kit manufacturer: (Germany) Adidas
- General sponsor: (Serbia) Lav pivo
- Other sponsor: (France) Renault

== See also ==
- List of FK Partizan seasons
