= Miladin Stevanović =

Serbian footballer

Personal information
- Full name: Miladin Stevanović
- Date of birth: 11 February 1996 (age 30)
- Place of birth: Bijeljina, Bosnia and Herzegovina
- Height: 1.79 m (5 ft 10 1/2 in)
- Position: Defender

Team information
- Current team: Radnik Bijeljina
- Number: 66

Youth career
- Radnik Bijeljina
- 2008–2013: Partizan

Senior career*
Years	Team	Apps	(Gls)
2013–2016	Partizan	10	(1)
2013–2014	→ Teleoptik (loan)	44	(3)
2016–2017	Kayserispor	2	(0)
2018–2025	Čukarički	169	(3)
2025–2026	Maccabi Bnei Reineh	18	(1)
2026–	Radnik Bijeljina	4	(0)

International career
2012–2013	Serbia U17	5	(1)
2014–2015	Serbia U19	11	(0)
2014–2017	Serbia U20	10	(1)
2017–2019	Serbia U21	9	(0)
Medal record
Gold medal – first place	FIFA U-20 World Cup	2015
- * Club domestic league appearances and goals as of 31 October 2026

Miladin Stevanović (Serbian Cyrillic: Миладин Стевановић; born 11 February 1996) is a Serbian professional footballer who plays as a defender for Bosnian Premier League club Radnik Bijeljina. He is capable of playing as a central defender or as a full-back on the right flank.

== Club career ==
=== Partizan ===
Born in Bijeljina, Stevanović came to Partizan in August 2008, being registered for the first time. In August 2013, Stevanović signed his first professional contract with Partizan, on a three-year deal. Stevanović was immediately loaned to Teleoptik, alongside Miroslav Bogosavac.

Stevanović made his official debut for Partizan in a UEFA Europa League game against Beşiktaş on 23 October 2014. Three days later, Stevanović has played his first match in Serbian SuperLiga against Jagodina. On 6 November 2014, Stevanović has played his second match in 2014–15 UEFA Europa League against Beşiktaş at Atatürk Olympic Stadium 2–1 away defeat. On 20 March 2016, he scored his first competitive goal for the club and equalizer on the match in a 1–2 away win over Čukarički.

=== Čukarički ===
After a period he spent with Kayserispor between 2016 and 2017, Stevanović returned to the Serbian SuperLiga side Čukarički at the beginning of 2018. Stevanović made his debut for the club in 2–0 victory over Mačva Šabac on 17 February 2018.

== International career ==
Stevanović represented Serbia at the 2014 UEFA Under-19 Championship, being eliminated in the semi-final by Portugal after a penalty shoot-out.

=== 2015 World Cup U-20 ===
On 10 June 2015, Stevanović made his debut in round of 16 on 2015 FIFA U-20 World Cup against Hungary as a substitute for Staniša Mandić. On 14 June 2015 in quarter-finals, he played full 120 minutes against United States. On 20 June 2015, in the final, Serbia won against Brazil and won this tournament after 28 years. Alongside him, in Serbian winning side were two other Partizan players: Ivan Šaponjić and Andrija Živković.

== Career statistics ==
=== Club ===
As of match played 31 October 2026

Appearances and goals by club, season and competition
Club	Season	League			National cup (Note: Includes Serbian Cup, Turkish Cup, Israel State Cup)		Continental		Total	
Club	Season	Division	Apps	Goals	Apps	Goals	Apps	Goals	Apps	Goals
Teleoptik (loan)	2013–14	Serbian First League	22	1	1	0	—		23	1
Teleoptik (loan)	2014–15	Serbian League Belgrade	12	2	—		—		12	2
Teleoptik (loan)	2015–16	Serbian League Belgrade	10	0	—		—		10	0
Teleoptik (loan)	Total		44	3	1	0	—		45	3
Partizan	2014–15	Serbian SuperLiga	3	0	1	0	2 (Note: Appearances in UEFA Europa League)	0	6	0
Partizan	2015–16	Serbian SuperLiga	7	1	1	0	—		8	1
Partizan	2016–17	Serbian SuperLiga	0	0	—		0	0	0	0
Partizan	Total		10	1	2	0	2	0	14	1
Kayserispor	2016–17	Süper Lig	2	0	7	0	—		9	0
Čukarički	2017–18	Serbian SuperLiga	15	0	2	0	—		17	0
Čukarički	2018–19	Serbian SuperLiga	31	2	1	1	—		32	3
Čukarički	2019–20	Serbian SuperLiga	5	0	2	0	—		7	0
Čukarički	2020–21	Serbian SuperLiga	23	0	1	0	—		24	0
Čukarički	2021–22	Serbian SuperLiga	28	1	1	0	2 (Note: Appearances in UEFA Europa Conference League)	0	31	1
Čukarički	2022–23	Serbian SuperLiga	26	0	2	0	4	0	32	0
Čukarički	2023–24	Serbian SuperLiga	23	0	2	0	4 (Note: Two appearances in UEFA Europa League, two appearances in UEFA Conference League)	0	29	0
Čukarički	2023–24	Serbian SuperLiga	18	0	1	0	—		19	0
Čukarički	Total		169	3	12	1	10	0	191	4
Maccabi Bnei Reineh	2025–26	Israeli Premier League	18	1	2	0	—		20	1
Radnik Bijeljina	2026–27	Bosnian Premier League	4	0	0	0	—		4	0
Career total			247	8	24	1	12	0	283	9

== Honours ==
Partizan

- Serbian SuperLiga: 2014–15
- Serbian Cup: 2015–16

Serbia

- FIFA U-20 World Cup: 2015

== Orders ==
- Medal of Merit (Republika Srpska)
