= Zoran Milinković (footballer) =

Serbian footballer and manager

Personal information
- Date of birth: 18 July 1968 (age 58)
- Place of birth: Belgrade, SFR Yugoslavia
- Height: 1.75 m (5 ft 9 in)
- Position: Defender

Team information
- Current team: Apollon Kalamarias (manager)

Youth career
- 1975–1977: TEK Sloga Veliki Crljeni
- 1977–1987: Partizan

Senior career*
Years	Team	Apps	(Gls)
1987–1989	Mladost Petrinja		
1990	Partizan	2	(0)
1991	Vojvodina	10	(0)
1991–1992	Mogren	25	(6)
1992–1993	Borac Banja Luka	16	(1)
1993–1994	Radnički Niš	31	(5)
1994	Kispest-Honvéd	13	(1)
1995	Tosu Futures	25	(4)
1996	Waregem	13	(1)
1996–1998	Nice	63	(2)
1998–1999	Hansa Rostock	6	(0)
1999–2001	Anorthosis Famagusta	40	(3)
2001–2002	Doxa Katokopia	8	(0)

Managerial career
- 2004: Obilić
- 2005–2008: BSK Borča
- 2008: Kolubara
- 2009: Srem
- 2009–2010: Spartak Subotica
- 2010–2011: Vojvodina
- 2012: Spartak Subotica
- 2012–2013: OFK Beograd
- 2013: Aris Thessaloniki
- 2014–2015: Voždovac
- 2015: Partizan
- 2016: Anorthosis
- 2017: Borac Banja Luka
- 2018: Rad
- 2019–2020: Kolubara
- 2020–2021: Kolubara
- 2021: Borac Banja Luka
- 2021–2022: Radnički 1923
- 2022: Napredak Kruševac
- 2022–2023: Al-Nasr Benghazi
- 2023–2024: Al-Ain
- 2024–2025: Al-Zulfi
- 2025: Al-Jandal
- 2026: Al-Ramtha
- 2026–: Apollon Kalamarias
- * Club domestic league appearances and goals

Zoran Milinković (Serbian Cyrillic: Зоран Милинковић; born 18 July 1968) is a Serbian football manager and former player. He is the current manager of Super League 2 club Apollon Kalamarias.

== Playing career ==
Milinković came through the youth system of Partizan, before starting his senior career at lower league club Mladost Petrinja. He returned to Partizan and made two league appearances during the first part of the 1990–91 season, before moving to Vojvodina. Milinković also played for Mogren, Borac Banja Luka, Radnički Niš, Kispest-Honvéd, Tosu Futures, Waregem, Nice, Hansa Rostock, Anorthosis Famagusta and Doxa Katokopia.

== Managerial career ==
Milinković started his managerial career as an assistant manager to Ratko Dostanić at Obilić during the 2002–03 season, before they both left and took up identical roles at Sartid Smederevo ahead of the 2003–04 season. He was appointed as the manager of Obilić in August 2004, but was released after only two months. He then became the manager of BSK Borča, having a lot of success in the following three seasons. He left the club before they made their Serbian SuperLiga debut. After leaving BSK Borča, Milinković had unassuming brief spells at Kolubara and Srem.

In the summer of 2009, he was appointed manager of newly promoted SuperLiga club Spartak Subotica. He also worked at Vojvodina, OFK Beograd, Aris Thessaloniki and Voždovac.

=== Partizan ===
On 25 March 2015, Milinković was named manager of FK Partizan after Marko Nikolić was sacked. On 4 April 2015, he made his debut on the bench of Partizan in a 2–1 home win against Radnički Kragujevac. In the spring part of the 2014–15 season, Milinković has returned the title of champion of Serbia to Partizan, which was last season won by Red Star Belgrade. Milinković enrolled 7 wins with Partizan in the Serbian SuperLiga in the spring part of the 2014–15 season and three draws, while in the Serbian Cup he enrolled one win and one defeat.

He began the 2015–16 season in a win over Dila Gori in the second qualifying round for the UEFA Champions League on 14 July 2015. In the Serbian SuperLiga he also had a great start, defeating Metalac Gornji Milanovac 4–0, while in the second round Partizan won against Jagodina 6–0. On 5 August 2015, Milinković and his squad won against Romanian champions Steaua București in the second leg of the third qualifying round for the Champions League and so qualified Partizan to the Champions League qualifying play-off. The last time that Partizan qualified to the Champions League play-off was when it was led by Aleksandar Stanojević in the summer of 2010.

On 26 August 2015, Milinković's Partizan was defeated by BATE Borisov and as a result entered the group stage of the UEFA Europa League.

=== Saudi Arabia ===
On 9 November 2023, Milinković was appointed as head coach of Saudi club Al-Ain.

On 3 June 2024, Milinković was appointed as head coach of Saudi club Al-Zulfi. He was sacked on 5 March 2025.

On 5 August 2025, Milinković was appointed as head coach of Al-Jandal. He left the club by mutual consent on 29 December 2025.

== Honours ==
=== Manager ===
Partizan

- Serbian SuperLiga: 2014–15
