= Miloš Ostojić (footballer, born 1991) =

Serbian footballer

Personal information
- Date of birth: 3 August 1991 (age 35)
- Place of birth: Titova Mitrovica, SR Serbia, SFR Yugoslavia
- Height: 1.88 m (6 ft 2 in)
- Position: Centre-back

Team information
- Current team: OFK Vršac
- Number: 26

Youth career
- 2000–2009: Partizan

Senior career*
Years	Team	Apps	(Gls)
2009–2012	Teleoptik	38	(4)
2012–2016	Partizan	37	(2)
2017	BATE Borisov	1	(0)
2018–2019	Napredak Kruševac	40	(1)
2019–2021	Čukarički	39	(2)
2021	Liepāja	5	(0)
2022–2023	Spartak Subotica	37	(0)
2023–2024	Zvijezda 09	14	(0)
2024–2025	Sloven	27	(2)
2025–	OFK Vršac	26	(0)

International career^{‡}
2009	Serbia U19	1	(0)
- * Club domestic league appearances and goals as of 14 May 2026 ‡ National team caps and goals as of 26 August 2009

Miloš Ostojić (Serbian Cyrillic: Милош Остојић; born 3 August 1991) is a Serbian professional footballer who plays as a centre-back for OFK Vršac.

== Club career ==
=== Teleoptik ===
Like many other promising youngsters at the club, Ostojić spent time at FK Teleoptik, making his debut in Serbia's second-tier league on 22 August 2009 against FK Novi Pazar. He went on to play 38 games for the club, scoring 4 goals in the process.

=== Partizan ===
On 24 January 2012, along with Miloš Jojić, Ostojić signed his first professional contract with Partizan, on a four-year deal. He made his debut for Partizan against FK Javor Ivanjica on 14 April 2012. He suffered from a tumour in 2015 and underwent injury in December that year, amongst other injuries.

He was released from Partizan at the end of the 2015–16 season due to persistent injuries.

=== BATE Borisov ===
On 28 February 2017, Ostojić signed a contract with Belarusian Premier League club FC BATE Borisov. After only 1 played game and five months spent at the club, he decided to leave BATE in July 2017.

=== Napredak Kruševac ===
In January 2018, six months after leaving BATE Borisov, Ostojić signed a contract with FK Napredak Kruševac. He made his debut for Napredak on 23 February 2018, in a 3–2 away league loss against FK Voždovac.

Ostojić scored his first and only goal for Napredak on 1 May 2019, in a 5–2 away league loss against FK Čukarički. He left Napredak on 1 July 2019, after his contract with the club expired.

=== Čukarički ===
On 6 August 2019, Ostojić signed a one-year contract with Čukarički.

== International career ==
Ostojić represented the Serbia U19 national team in 2009. He made his debut and played his only game for the Serbia U19 team on 26 August 2009, in a 2–0 home friendly match win against Bosnia and Herzegovina.

== Career statistics ==
As of 19 May 2019

Appearances and goals by club, season and competition
Club	Season	League			Cup		Continental		Total	
Club	Season	Division	Apps	Goals	Apps	Goals	Apps	Goals	Apps	Goals
Teleoptik	2009–10	Serbian First League	5	0	—		—		5	0
Teleoptik	2010–11	Serbian First League	13	0	2	0	—		15	0
Teleoptik	2011–12	Serbian First League	20	4	2	0	—		22	4
Teleoptik	Total		38	4	4	0	—		42	0
Partizan	2011–12	Serbian SuperLiga	6	0	0	0	0	0	6	0
Partizan	2012–13	Serbian SuperLiga	13	1	0	0	11	1	24	2
Partizan	2013–14	Serbian SuperLiga	10	0	2	0	3	0	15	0
Partizan	2014–15	Serbian SuperLiga	1	0	0	0	2	0	3	0
Partizan	2015–16	Serbian SuperLiga	7	1	0	0	2	0	9	1
Partizan	Total		37	2	2	0	18	1	57	3
BATE Borisov	2017	Belarusian Premier League	1	0	2	0	0	0	3	0
Napredak Kruševac	2017–18	Serbian SuperLiga	10	0	0	0	—		10	0
Napredak Kruševac	2018–19	Serbian SuperLiga	30	1	2	0	—		32	1
Napredak Kruševac	Total		40	1	2	0	—		42	1
Čukarički	2019–20	Serbian SuperLiga	0	0	0	0	—		0	0
Career total			116	7	10	0	18	1	144	8

== Honours ==
Partizan

- Serbian SuperLiga: 2011–12, 2012–13, 2014–15
- Serbian Cup: 2015–16

BATE Borisov

- Belarusian Super Cup: 2017
