= Nemanja Kojić (footballer) =

Serbian footballer

Personal information
- Date of birth: 3 February 1990 (age 36)
- Place of birth: Loznica, Serbia, Yugoslavia
- Height: 1.85 m (6 ft 1 in)
- Position: Forward

Team information
- Current team: Brodarac

Youth career
- Rad

Senior career*
Years	Team	Apps	(Gls)
2007–2012	Rad	86	(18)
2013–2015	Partizan	42	(16)
2015–2016	Gaziantep BB	45	(12)
2017	Radnički Niš	16	(3)
2017–2018	Istanbulspor	25	(4)
2018	Ordabasy	13	(3)
2019	Tokyo Verdy	9	(2)
2019	Napredak Kruševac	9	(1)
2020–2021	Radnički Niš	23	(3)
2021	Bylis	18	(0)
2021	Dečić	1	(0)
2021	PSS Sleman	11	(3)
2022–2023	Zvijezda 09	19	(6)
2023	Loznica		
2024	Zemun		
2024-	Brodarac		

International career
2007	Serbia U19 (Note: Only official UEFA matches included)	3	(1)
2010–2012	Serbia U21	15	(2)
- * Club domestic league appearances and goals as of 3 June 2023

Nemanja Kojić (Serbian Cyrillic: Немања Којић; born 3 February 1990) is a Serbian professional footballer who plays as a forward for Serbian First League club Brodarac.

== Club career ==
=== Rad ===
Born in Loznica, Kojić joined Rad as a trainee in 2003. He made his senior debuts in the 2006–07 season, recording three appearances in the process. In May 2008, Kojić broke his leg in a match against Sevojno, causing him to miss the entire 2008–09 season. On 2 May 2010, he scored his first senior career goal, finding the back of the net in a 1–0 home win over Jagodina. On 30 June 2011, he scored a goal and provided three assists in a 6–0 home win over Tre Penne in the first leg of Europa League first qualifying round. One week later, he scored twice in the return leg against Tre Penne in a 1–3 away win. On 19 August 2012, Kojić scored twice in a 2–2 away draw against Red Star Belgrade. He scored another brace on 1 September 2012 in a 2–3 away league win over Spartak Subotica.

=== Partizan ===
On 3 February 2013, on his 23rd birthday, Kojić was transferred to Partizan, together with Predrag Luka. Both players signed a three-and-a-half-year contract. Kojić made his debut for Partizan against Donji Srem on 2 March 2013. Four days later, Kojić scored his first two goals for Partizan in a 4–0 away league win over BSK Borča.

On 26 April 2014, Kojić scored the winning goal in the 90th minute of the Belgrade derby in a 2–1 home win over Red Star Belgrade. On 3 May 2014, Kojić scored a hat-trick in a 5–0 away win over Donji Srem. He finished the season as the club's top scorer with eight goals.

=== Gaziantep BB ===
In August 2016, Kojić joined Turkish second-tier side Gaziantep BB, signing a three-year contract and was given the number 36 shirt.

=== Radnički Niš ===
On 15 February 2017, Kojić returned to his homeland and signed with Radnički Niš until the end of the 2016–17 season.

=== Tokyo Verdy ===
On 16 January 2019, Tokyo Verdy announced the signing of Kojić.

== International career ==
Kojić was a regular member of the Serbia national under-21 team during the qualifications for the 2013 UEFA European Championship.

== Career statistics ==
=== Club ===
As of match played 3 April 2021

Appearances and goals by club, season and competition
Club	Season	League			National cup		League cup		Continental		Other		Total	
Club	Season	Division	Apps	Goals	Apps	Goals	Apps	Goals	Apps	Goals	Apps	Goals	Apps	Goals
Rad	2006–07	Serbian First League	3	0	0	0	—		—		—		3	0
Rad	2007–08	Serbian First League	5	0	1	0	—		—		—		6	0
Rad	2008–09	Serbian SuperLiga	0	0	0	0	—		—		—		0	0
Rad	2009–10	Serbian SuperLiga	7	1			—		—		—		7	1
Rad	2010–11	Serbian SuperLiga	27	3	1	0	—		—		—		28	3
Rad	2011–12	Serbian SuperLiga	25	4	0	0	—		4	4	—		29	8
Rad	2012–13	Serbian SuperLiga	15	5	3	1	—		—		—		18	6
Rad	Total		82	13	5	1	0	0	4	4	0	0	91	18
Partizan	2012–13	Serbian SuperLiga	13	6	0	0	—		0	0	—		13	6
Partizan	2013–14	Serbian SuperLiga	15	7	2	1	—		3	0	—		20	8
Partizan	2014–15	Serbian SuperLiga	13	2	5	0	—		3	0	—		21	2
Partizan	2015–16	Serbian SuperLiga	1	1	0	0	—		0	0	—		1	1
Partizan	Total		42	16	7	1	0	0	6	0	0	0	55	17
Gaziantep BB	2015–16	TFF First League	29	9	0	0	—		—		—		29	9
Gaziantep BB	2016–17	TFF First League	16	3	0	0	—		—		—		16	3
Gaziantep BB	Total		45	12	0	0	—		—		—		45	12
Radnički Niš	2016–17	Serbian SuperLiga	16	3	0	0	—		0	0	—		16	3
Istanbulspor	2017–18	TFF First League	25	4	1	0	—		—		—		26	4
Ordabasy	2018	Kazakhstan Premier League	13	3	0	0	—		—		—		13	3
Tokyo Verdy	2019	J2 League	10	2	0	0	—		—		—		10	2
Career total			212	50	13	2	0	0	10	4	0	0	219	56

== Honours ==
Partizan

- Serbian SuperLiga: 2012–13, 2014–15

Individual

- Serbian SuperLiga Player of the Week: 2020–21 (Round 7)
