= Generali Deyna Cup =

Deyna Cup
- Organiser(s): Legia Warsaw
- Founded: 2013
- Abolished: 2013
- Region: Poland
- Teams: 4
- Last champions: Legia (1st title)
- Most championships: Legia (1 title)

The Deyna Cup was a two-day association football tournament that featured four teams. It was played at the Polish Army Stadium in Warsaw, Poland. This tournament was dedicated to Kazimierz Deyna.

The only edition was organised in 2013 under the commercial name Generali Deyna Cup. It was not continued due to financial reasons.

Legia beat Fluminense in the final.

== Participating teams ==
- Austria Wien (Austria)
- Fluminense (Brazil)
- Legia Warsaw (Poland)
- Partizan (Serbia)

== Competition format ==
Semi-finals; 6 July
15:00
Austria Wien	0
(Brazil) Fluminense	1
18:00
(Poland) Legia Warsaw	2
(Serbia) Partizan	1

Final; 7 July
16:00
(Brazil) Fluminense	0
(Poland) Legia Warsaw	2
Third place
13:00
Austria Wien	2
(Serbia) Partizan	1
