= Nemanja Petrović =

Serbian footballer

Personal information
- Full name: Nemanja Petrović
- Date of birth: 17 April 1992 (age 34)
- Place of birth: Valjevo, SR Serbia, SFR Yugoslavia
- Height: 1.76 m (5 ft 9 1/2 in)
- Position: Left-back

Team information
- Current team: Mladost Lučani
- Number: 3

Youth career
- Krušik Valjevo
- 2008–2010: Partizan

Senior career*
Years	Team	Apps	(Gls)
2010–2013	Teleoptik	75	(5)
2013–2016	Partizan	34	(1)
2016	→ Maccabi Netanya (loan)	9	(0)
2016–2017	Chaves	1	(0)
2017–2019	Napredak Kruševac	61	(0)
2019–2020	Rad	19	(0)
2020–2026	TSC	147	(5)
2026–	Mladost Lučani	0	(0)

International career^{‡}
2013–2015	Serbia U21	11	(0)
2023	Serbia	1	(0)
- * Club domestic league appearances and goals as of 6 January 2025 ‡ National team caps and goals as of 25 January 2023

Nemanja Petrović (Serbian Cyrillic: Немања Петровић; born 17 April 1992) is a Serbian professional footballer who plays as a defender for Mladost Lučani.

== Club career ==
=== Partizan ===
==== 2013–14 season ====
On 11 July 2013, Petrović signed a four-year contract with Partizan. His squad number was confirmed as 5, replacing Žarko Tomašević who moved to Kortrijk soon before Nemanja Petrović arrival. He was first in the protocol for Partizan in a second qualifying round for UEFA Champions League against Armenian club Shirak on 17 July 2013. He made his debut for the club in a UEFA Europa League qualifier against Swiss club Thun on 22 August 2013. Petrović scored his first official goal for Partizan on 20 October 2013 against Jagodina.

During the spring part of the season, Petrović has played only one match, against Javor and has been on the bench three times. In the 2014–15 season, Petrovic has played a total of 12 appearances for Partizan, scoring one goal and enrolled one assist.

==== 2014–15 season ====
Petrović made his first appearance of the 2014–15 season on 15 July against HB Torshavn in second qualifying round for UEFA Champions League. He also played 2 matches in Play-off of 2014–15 UEFA Europa League against Neftçi. On 28 August 2014, Petrović and his team enters the group stage of the UEFA Europa League, after of victory over the Azerbaijanian club Neftçi. On 18 September 2014 Partizan has played against Tottenham Hotspur, in 54 minutes into the game Vladimir Volkov complained of a violation and Petrovic entered the game and enrolled his first appearance in the group stage of a some European competition. He is in all other matches in the Europa League been on the bench except in the last game in the group stage where Petrović played against Greek club Asteras Tripolis.

== International career ==
Petrović made his debut for the Serbian national under-21 team under manager Radovan Ćurčić in 2013. He was a member of the team at the 2015 UEFA Under-21 Championship.

Petrović made his debut for Serbia on 25 January 2023 in a friendly match against the USA. Serbia won the game 2–1, with Petrović in the starting line-up.

== Career statistics ==
=== International ===
As of 25 January 2023

Serbia
Year	Apps	Goals
2023	1	0
Total	1	0

== Honours ==
Partizan

- Serbian SuperLiga: 2014–15
- Serbian SuperLiga Player of the Week: 2022–23 (Round 32, Round 34)
