= Nikola Drinčić =

Serbian footballer

Nikola Drinčić Никола Дринчић
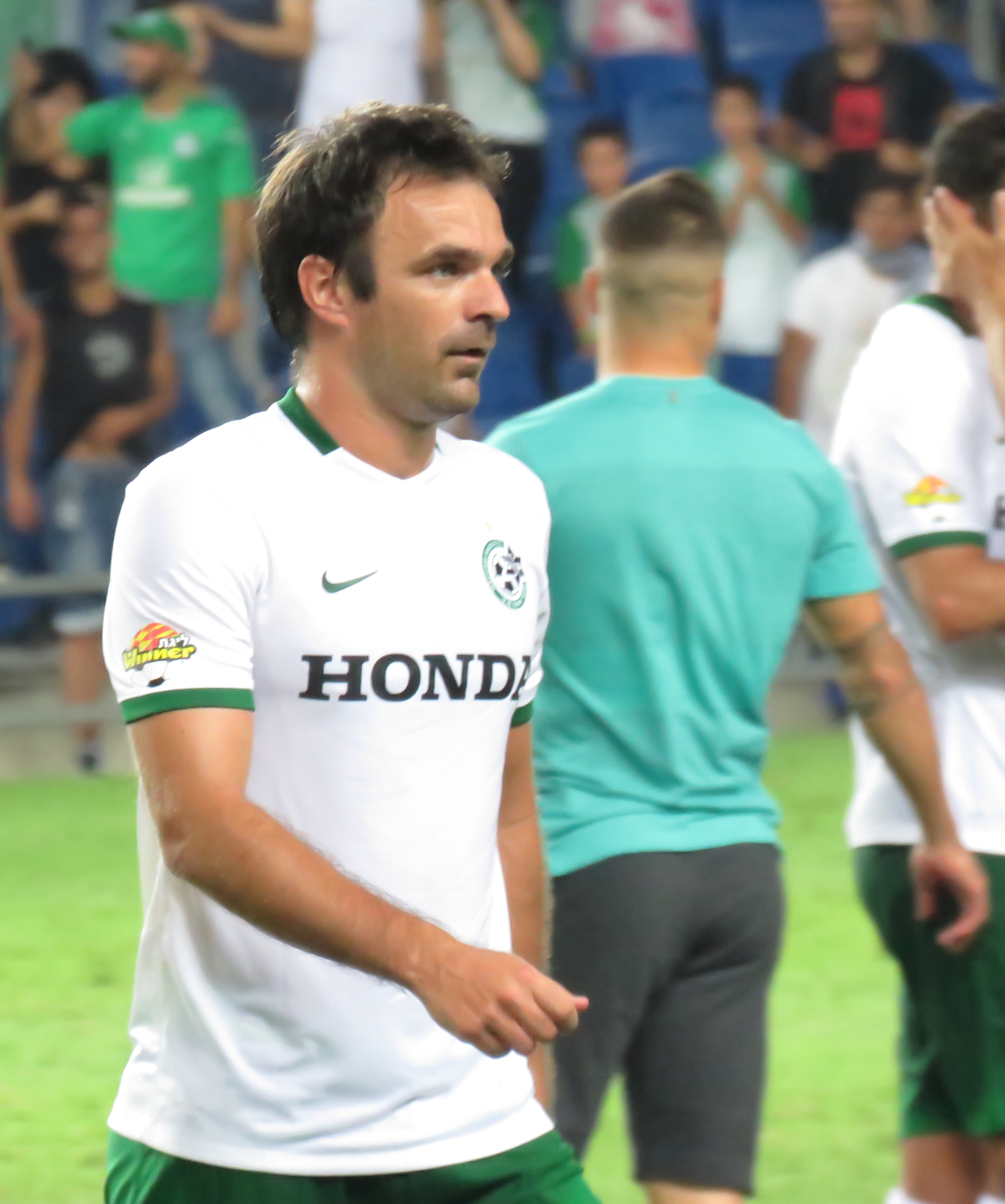
- Drinčić with Maccabi Haifa in 2015

Personal information
- Date of birth: 7 September 1984 (age 42)
- Place of birth: Belgrade, SR Serbia, SFR Yugoslavia
- Height: 1.82 m (6 ft 0 in)
- Position: Midfielder

Team information
- Current team: Radnički Niš (manager)

Youth career
- Partizan

Senior career*
Years	Team	Apps	(Gls)
2003–2006	Partizan	4	(0)
2003–2004	→ Teleoptik (loan)	21	(0)
2004–2005	→ Spartak Subotica (loan)	18	(1)
2005–2006	→ Budućnost Banatski Dvor (loan)	28	(9)
2006	Gaziantepspor	15	(1)
2007–2010	Amkar Perm	80	(4)
2010	Spartak Moscow	4	(0)
2011–2013	Krasnodar	57	(3)
2013–2015	Partizan	36	(5)
2015	Maccabi Haifa	13	(0)
2016–2017	Rad	14	(0)
2017–2018	Čukarički	36	(4)
2018–2019	Radnički Niš	30	(4)
2019–2021	Vojvodina	64	(4)
Total		420	(35)

International career
2000	FR Yugoslavia U16 (Note: Only official UEFA matches included)	2	(0)
2001	FR Yugoslavia U19	1	(0)
2006–2007	Serbia U21	11	(0)
2007–2014	Montenegro	33	(3)

Managerial career
- 2021–2022: IMT (assistant)
- 2022–2023: Omladinac Novi Banovci
- 2023–2024: Zemun
- 2024–2025: Radnički Niš
Medal record
Silver medal – second place	UEFA Under-21 Championship	2007
- * Club domestic league appearances and goals

Nikola Drinčić (Serbian Cyrillic: Никола Дринчић, pronounced [nǐkola drîːntʃitɕ]; born 7 September 1984) is a professional football manager and former player.

After playing for Serbia's national under-21 team, Drinčić represented Montenegro at senior level between 2007 and 2014.

== Club career ==
=== Early years ===
After spending his development years in Partizan's youth academy, Drinčić made his senior debuts with the club's affiliated side Teleoptik. He signed a professional contract with Partizan in March 2004, making four league appearances until the end of the season. In the next two years, Drinčić was sent on loan to Spartak Subotica and Budućnost Banatski Dvor, enjoying a successful stint with the latter, scoring nine league goals from 28 appearances in the 2005–06 season.

In the summer of 2006, Drinčić was sold to Turkish Süper Lig club Gaziantepspor.

=== Amkar Perm, Spartak Moscow and Krasnodar ===
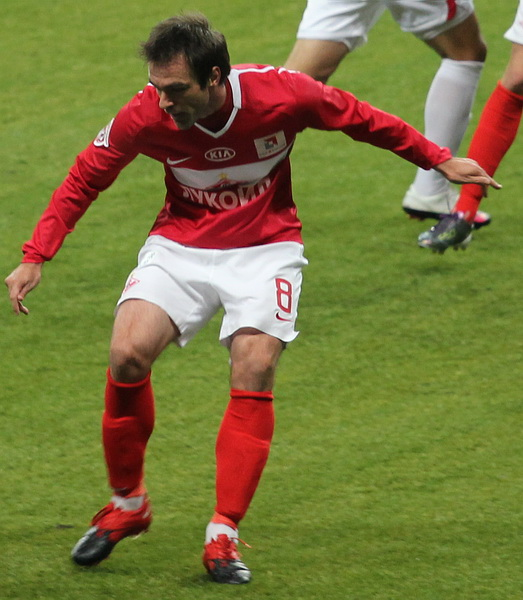
Drinčić playing for Spartak Moscow in 2010

He left the country after only six months, transferring to Russian club Amkar Perm. Over the following three years, Drinčić made 81 league appearances and scored four goals for the side.

In January 2010, Drinčić joined Spartak Moscow on a free transfer. He however broke his shinbone in a friendly just two weeks after joining the club, causing him to make a half-year break from competitive football. After recovering, Drinčić was never able to break into the starting eleven and appeared in just four league games for the club, eventually leaving at the end of the season. On 3 November 2010, Drinčić made his UEFA Champions League debut in a 1–4 away loss to Chelsea at Stamford Bridge, coming off the bench in 67th minute as substitute for Aleksandr Sheshukov. On 8 December 2010, he made assist in a 1–2 away victory against Žilina in UEFA Champions League.

In February 2011, Drinčić signed with fellow Premier League club Krasnodar. He collected 57 league appearances and scored three goals in the following two and a half years. On 2 September 2013, Drinčić was released from his contract.

=== Return to Partizan ===
In December 2013, Drinčić joined his former club Partizan on a free transfer, penning a three-year contract. He made his competitive debut for the club in a 0–0 away draw with Novi Pazar on 22 February 2014. On 8 March 2014, Drinčić scored his first goal for the club, in a 5–0 away league victory over Radnički 1923. In next round, he scored a goal from a free kick to give his team a 4–2 win over Rad. On 26 April 2014, Drinčić scored a spectacular goal from a free kick in a Belgrade derby in a 2–1 home win over Red Star Belgrade. Drinčić was again named in the competition's best eleven due to his performances throughout the season.

In the following 2014–15 season, Drinčić played four matches in the 2014–15 UEFA Europa League group stage. On 18 October 2014, Drinčić scored again against Red Star and again from a free kick, helping club to reach a 1–0 victory in 147th Derby. On 14 March 2015, he scored a goal from a free kick in a 2–0 home league victory over Rad. He recorded a 38 appearances in all competitions and scored two goals and seven assist in 2014–15 season as the club won the title. He was again named in the competition's best eleven due to his performances throughout the season.

=== Later years ===
In June 2015, Drinčić signed a two-year contract with Israeli club Maccabi Haifa with an option for another season. His contract was eventually terminated in January of the following year by mutual consent.

After returning to the country of his birth, Drinčić joined top-flight side Rad in July 2016. He made his competitive debut for the club against Radnički Niš on 5 August 2016. He left the club by mutual agreement in March 2017.

In June 2017, Drinčić signed one-year deal with Čukarički. On 21 July 2017, Drinčić made his competitive debut for the club against Vojvodina. In next round, Drinčić scored a spectacular goal in a 2–0 home league victory over Napredak.

In August 2018, Drinčić signed with Radnički Niš.

He joined Vojvodina in June 2019.

== International career ==
Drinčić was a regular member of the Serbia national under-21 team, making his debut in August 2006. He also participated at the 2007 UEFA Under-21 Championship in the Netherlands, winning the silver medal after losing to the hosts in the final.

Despite representing Serbia at youth level, Drinčić eventually chose to play for Montenegro on the senior level, believing it would get him more playing time. He made his debut for the Montenegro national team in the country's inaugural match versus Sweden in September 2007. He has earned a total of 33 caps, scoring 3 goals. His final international was a March 2014 friendly match against Ghana.

== Playing statistics ==
National team	Year	Apps	Goals
Montenegro	2007	2	0
Montenegro	2008	7	1
Montenegro	2009	9	0
Montenegro	2010	0	0
Montenegro	2011	6	0
Montenegro	2012	5	2
Montenegro	2013	3	0
Montenegro	2014	1	0
Total		33	3

Scores and results list Montenegro's goal tally first.

#	Date	Venue	Opponent	Score	Result	Competition
1	27 May 2008	Podgorica City Stadium, Podgorica	Kazakhstan	2–0	3–0	Friendly
2	25 May 2012	King Baudouin Stadium, Brussels	Belgium	2–2	2–2	Friendly
3	7 September 2012	Podgorica City Stadium, Podgorica	Poland	1–1	2–2	2014 FIFA World Cup qualifying

== Managerial statistics ==
As of 2 March 2025

Managerial record by team and tenure
Team	From	To	Record				
Team	From	To	P	W	D	L	Win %
Radnički Niš	3 June 2024	Present	27	9	6	12	33.33
Total			27	9	6	12	33.33

== Honours ==
=== Player ===
Partizan

- Serbian SuperLiga: 2014–15

Vojvodina

- Serbian Cup: 2019–20

Serbia

- UEFA Under-21 Championship: Runner-up 2007

=== Individual ===
- Serbian SuperLiga Team of the Season: 2013–14, 2014–15, 2017–18, 2018–19
- Serbian SuperLiga Player of the Week: 2020–21 (Round 12)
