= Bartal Wardum =

Faroese footballer (born 1997)

Personal information
- Full name: Bartal Wardum
- Date of birth: 3 May 1997 (age 29)
- Place of birth: Faroe Islands
- Height: 1.89 m (6 ft 2 in)
- Position: Defender

Team information
- Current team: HB
- Number: 17

Youth career
- –2016: HB

Senior career*
Years	Team	Apps	(Gls)
2013–2015	HB II	28	(5)
2013–	HB	274	(14)

International career^{‡}
2012–2013	Faroe Islands U17	13	(0)
2014	Faroe Islands U19	3	(0)
2015–2018	Faroe Islands U21	12	(0)
2020–	Faroe Islands	3	(0)
- * Club domestic league appearances and goals as of 2 June 2026 ‡ National team caps and goals as of 19 may 2025

Bartal Wardum (born 3 May 1997) is a Faroese footballer who plays as a defender for HB and the Faroe Islands national team.

== Career ==
Wardum made his international debut for the Faroe Islands on 11 November 2020 in a friendly match against Lithuania.

== Career statistics ==
=== International ===
As of 19 may 2025

Faroe Islands
Year	Apps	Goals
2020	2	0
2024	1	0
Total	3	0

== Personal life ==
Wardum works as a Banker while also playing football.
