= Ivan Šaponjić =

Serbian footballer

Personal information
- Date of birth: 2 August 1997 (age 29)
- Place of birth: Nova Varoš, Serbia, FR Yugoslavia
- Height: 1.90 m (6 ft 3 in)
- Position: Striker

Team information
- Current team: SHB Da Nang
- Number: 9

Youth career
- Zlatar Nova Varoš
- Sloboda Užice
- 2013–2015: Partizan

Senior career*
Years	Team	Apps	(Gls)
2013–2015	Partizan	32	(7)
2016–2019	Benfica B	67	(14)
2017–2018	→ Zulte Waregem (loan)	31	(6)
2019–2022	Atlético Madrid	2	(0)
2021	→ Cádiz (loan)	9	(1)
2022–2024	Slovan Bratislava	25	(6)
2023	→ Bandırmaspor (loan)	12	(8)
2023–2024	→ Ümraniyespor (loan)	15	(1)
2025	Fehérvár	12	(4)
2025–2026	Diósgyőr	17	(3)
2026–	SHB Da Nang	1	(1)

International career^{‡}
2013–2014	Serbia U17	6	(5)
2014–2016	Serbia U19	10	(9)
2015	Serbia U20	7	(2)
2015–2019	Serbia U21	11	(2)
Medal record
Men's Football
Representing Serbia
FIFA U-20 World Cup
Winner	2015 New Zealand
- * Club domestic league appearances and goals as of 6 September 2026 ‡ National team caps and goals as of 24 June 2019 (UTC)

Ivan Šaponjić (Serbian Cyrillic: Иван Шапоњић; born 2 August 1997) is a Serbian professional footballer who plays as a striker for V.League 1 club SHB Da Nang.

At international level, Šaponjić won the gold medal for Serbia at the 2015 FIFA U-20 World Cup, scoring two goals in the process.

== Club career ==
=== Partizan ===
Born in Nova Varoš, Šaponjić started playing football at local clubs Zlatar Nova Varoš and Sloboda Užice before joining the youth academy of Partizan. He made his senior debut for the club in a league game on 30 November 2013, coming on as a 76th-minute substitute in a 2–0 home win over Spartak Subotica. He eventually failed to make any other competitive appearance in the 2013–14 season.

On 30 May 2014, he signed his first professional contract with Partizan, penning a three-year deal. He scored his first competitive goal for the team in a 2–0 away victory over Jagodina in the second leg of the Serbian Cup semi-final on 8 April 2015. Five days later, he scored his first league goal in a 3–1 away win over OFK Beograd. In total, he scored 5 goals in 16 appearances in all competitions during the 2014–15 season.

On 25 July 2015, Šaponjić scored a brace in a 6–0 home league win over Jagodina. He scored his first international goal for Partizan with an overhead kick in a 2–1 home win over BATE Borisov in the return leg of the Champions League play-off round on 26 August 2015. This was the club's 100th victory in European football. He also scored both goals for Partizan in their 2–0 Serbian Cup win over Sinđelić Beograd on 28 October 2015.

=== Benfica ===
On 12 January 2016, Šaponjić signed a five-and-a-half-year contract with Portuguese champions Benfica and was immediately assigned to their reserve team. In July 2017, he was loaned out to Belgian club Zulte Waregem.

=== Atlético Madrid ===
On 11 July 2019, Šaponjić signed a three-year contract with Atlético Madrid for an undisclosed fee, reported to be in region of 500 thousand euros. He made his debut on 23 January 2020, in a Copa del Rey clash against Cultural Leonesa.

On 22 January 2021, Šaponjić joined fellow La Liga side Cádiz on loan until the end of the season. On 31 January 2021, he made his club debut in a 2–4 home league defeat against his contractual owners, Atlético Madrid.

=== Slovan Bratislava ===
In January 2022, Slovan Bratislava announced the signing of Šaponjić on a 3,5 year deal.

=== Fehérvár ===
On 30 January 2025, Šaponjić signed with Fehérvár in Nemzeti Bajnokság, Hungary.

=== Diósgyőr ===
On 25 June 2025, Šaponjić signed with Diósgyőr in Nemzeti Bajnokság, Hungary.

On 24 April 2026, Šaponjić mutually terminated his contract with Diósgyőr.

=== SHB Da Nang ===
On 24 July 2026, Šaponjić moved to Vietnam, signing for V.League 1 side SHB Da Nang.

== International career ==
Internationally, Šaponjić represented his homeland at various youth levels. He was the team's joint top scorer (alongside Luka Jović) with five goals in their unsuccessful qualification campaign for the 2014 UEFA Under-17 Championship. With three goals, Šaponjić was the team's joint top scorer (again with Jović) in their unsuccessful qualification campaign for the 2015 UEFA Under-19 Championship.

Šaponjić was included in the final 21-man squad for the 2015 FIFA U-20 World Cup. He scored an injury time equalizer against Hungary in the round of 16 on 10 June 2015, with Serbia eventually winning the game 2–1 after extra time. On 17 June 2015, he scored an extra time winning goal in the semi-final against Mali. He was the team's joint top scorer (alongside Nemanja Maksimović, Staniša Mandić and Andrija Živković) with two goals, as Serbia eventually won the tournament.

== Career statistics ==
=== Club ===
As of matches played 9 May 2026

Club	Season	League			Cup		Continental		Other		Total	
Club	Season	Division	Apps	Goals	Apps	Goals	Apps	Goals	Apps	Goals	Apps	Goals
Partizan	2013–14	Serbian SuperLiga	1	0	0	0	0	0	—		1	0
Partizan	2014–15	Serbian SuperLiga	14	4	2	1	0	0	—		16	5
Partizan	2015–16	Serbian SuperLiga	17	3	1	2	7 (Note: Four appearances and one goal in UEFA Champions League, three appearances in UEFA Europa League)	1	—		25	6
Partizan	Total		32	7	3	3	7	1	—		42	11
Benfica B	2015–16	LigaPro	19	5	—		—		—		19	5
Benfica B	2016–17	LigaPro	21	3	—		—		—		21	3
Benfica B	2018–19	LigaPro	28	6	—		—		—		28	6
Benfica B	Total		68	14	—		—		—		68	14
Zulte Waregem (loan)	2017–18	Belgian Pro League	21	5	2	1	5 (Note: Appearance(s) in UEFA Europa League)	0	11 (Note: One appearance in Belgian Super Cup, ten appearances and one goal in Belgian Europa League play-offs)	1	39	7
Zulte Waregem (loan)	Total		21	5	2	1	5	0	11	1	39	7
Atlético Madrid	2019–20	La Liga	2	0	1	0	0	0	0	0	3	0
Atlético Madrid	2020–21	La Liga	0	0	2	0	0	0	—		2	0
Atlético Madrid	Total		2	0	3	0	0	0	0	0	5	0
Cádiz (loan)	2020–21	La Liga	9	1	—		—		—		9	1
Cádiz (loan)	Total		9	1	-		-		-		9	1
Slovan Bratislava	2021–22	Slovak Super Liga	11	4	5	0	—		—		16	4
Slovan Bratislava	2022–23	Slovak Super Liga	14	2	3	1	10 (Note: Four appearances in UEFA Champions League, one appearance and one goal in UEFA Europa League, five appearances in UEFA Conference League)	1	—		27	4
Slovan Bratislava	Total		25	6	8	1	10	1	—		43	8
Bandırmaspor (loan)	2022–23	1.Lig	12	8	0	0	—		—		12	8
Bandırmaspor (loan)	Total		12	8	0	0	-		-		12	8
Fehérvár	2024–25	Nemzeti Bajnokság I	12	4	2	3	—		—		0	0
Fehérvár	Total		12	4	2	3	-		-		14	7
Diósgyőr	2025–26	Nemzeti Bajnokság I	17	3	1	2	-		-		18	5
Diósgyőr	Total		17	3	1	2	-		-		18	5
Career total			198	48	19	10	22	2	11	1	236	54

== Honours ==
=== Club ===
Partizan

- Serbian SuperLiga: 2014–15
- Serbian Cup: Runner-up 2014–15

Slovan Bratislava

- Fortuna Liga: 2021–22

=== International ===
Serbia

- FIFA U-20 World Cup: 2015
