= Ivan Petrović (footballer, born 1993) =

Serbian footballer

Personal information
- Full name: Ivan Petrović
- Date of birth: 3 July 1993 (age 33)
- Place of birth: Kragujevac, FR Yugoslavia
- Height: 1.82 m (5 ft 11 1/2 in)
- Position: Midfielder

Youth career
- Radnički Kragujevac

Senior career*
Years	Team	Apps	(Gls)
2011–2014	Radnički Kragujevac	55	(3)
2014–2017	Partizan	2	(0)
2017	Brežice 1919	11	(1)
2018	Gorodeya	14	(0)
2019	Krško	8	(0)

International career
2011–2012	Serbia U19	7	(0)
- * Club domestic league appearances and goals as of 1 September 2019

Ivan Petrović (Serbian Cyrillic: Иван Петровић; born 3 July 1993) is a Serbian former professional footballer who played as a midfielder.

== Club career ==
=== Radnički Kragujevac ===
Petrović made his debut with Radnički Kragujevac in the 2011–12 campaign. He played three years for the club, making a total of 55 league appearances and scoring three goals, one each season. On 10 May 2014, Petrović scored a spectacular goal from the middle of the pitch in a 3–3 home draw with Javor Ivanjica.

=== Partizan ===
On 4 August 2014, Petrović signed a four-year contract with Partizan and was awarded the number 28 shirt. In April 2017, Petrović terminated a contract with the club.

=== Brežice ===
On 23 August 2017, Petrović signed for Slovenian club NK Brežice 1919.

=== Gorodeya ===
On 17 March 2018, Petrović signed for Belarus club Gorodeya.

== International career ==
Petrović represented Serbia at the 2012 UEFA Under-19 Championship, where his team was eliminated in the group stage.

== Honours ==
Partizan

- Serbian SuperLiga: 2014–15
- Serbian Cup: 2015–16
