= Markt Hartmannsdorf =

- Municipality
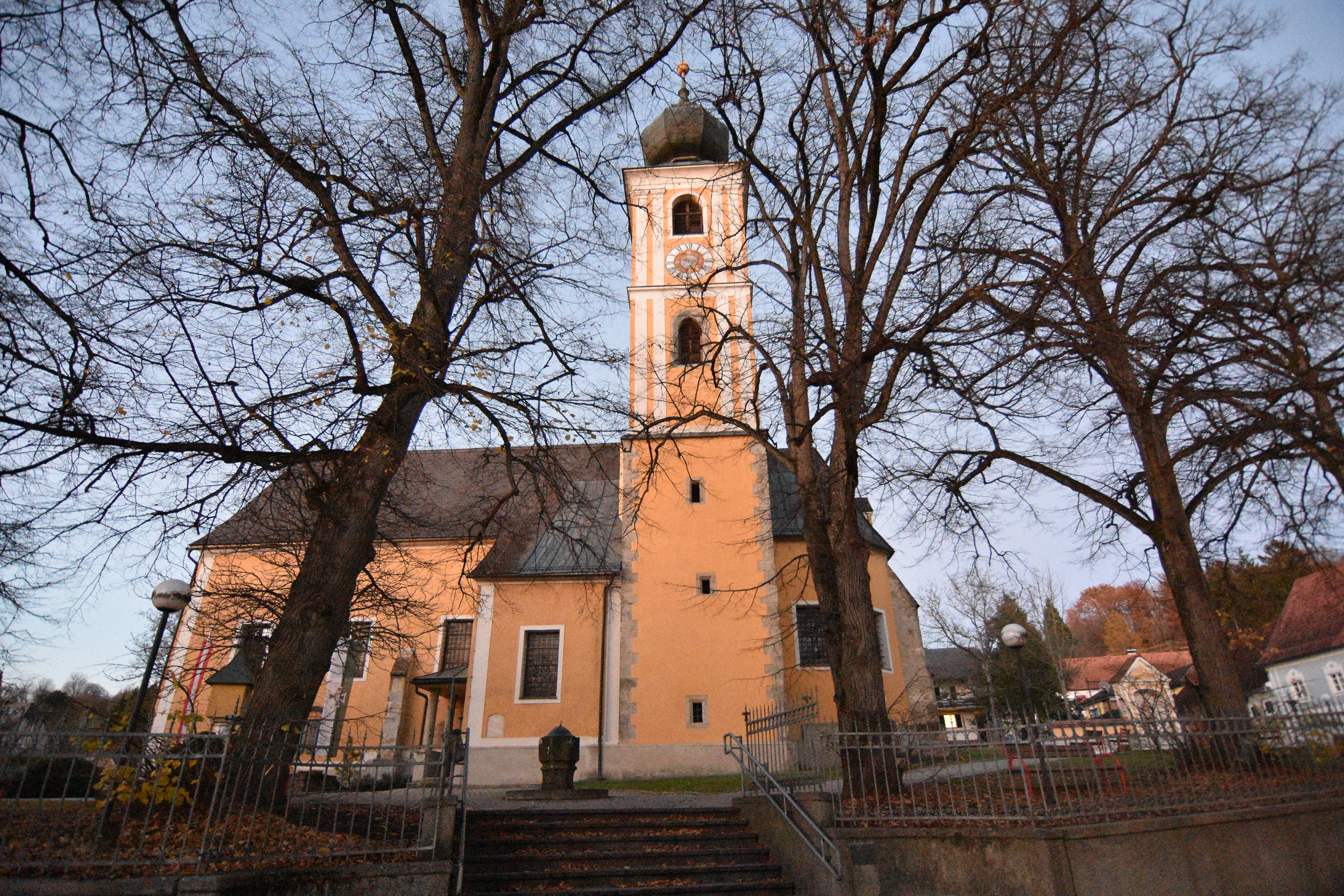
- Markt Hartmannsdorf parish church

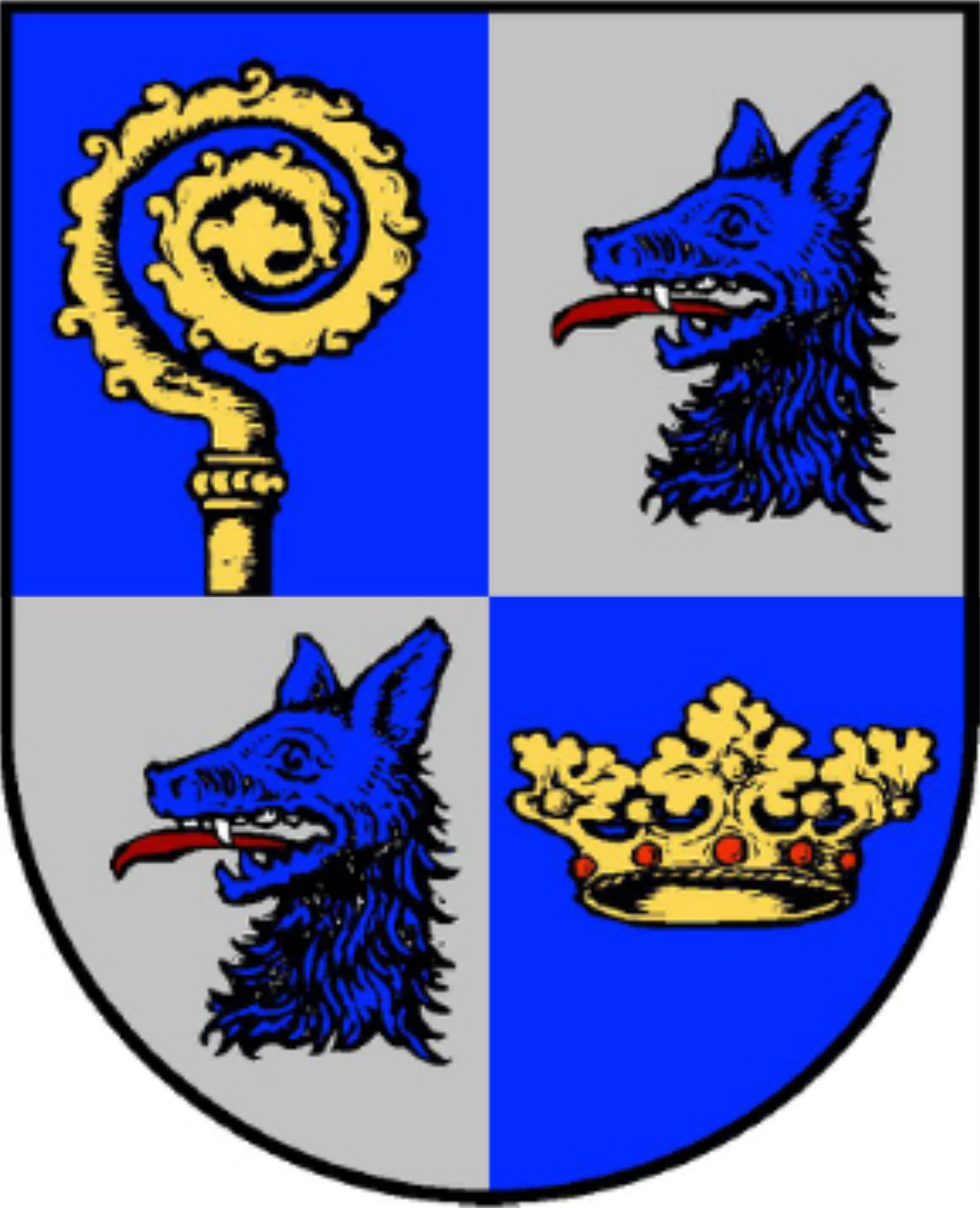
- Coat of arms

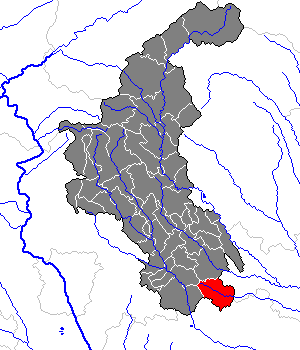
- Location within Weiz district

- Location within Austria
- Coordinates: 47°03′15″N 15°50′32″E
- Country: Austria
- State: Styria
- District: Weiz

Government
  - Mayor: Ing. Otmar Hiebaum (ÖVP)

Area
  - Total: 29.29 km^{2} (11.31 sq mi)
- Elevation: 331 m (1,086 ft)

Population (2018-01-01)
  - Total: 2,950
  - Density: 101/km^{2} (261/sq mi)
- Time zone: UTC+1 (CET)
  - Summer (DST): UTC+2 (CEST)
- Postal code: 8311
- Area code: 03114
- Vehicle registration: WZ
- Website: www.markt-hartmannsdorf.at

Markt Hartmannsdorf is a municipality in the district of Weiz in the Austrian state of Styria.
