= Predrag Luka =

Serbian footballer

Personal information
- Full name: Predrag Luka
- Date of birth: 11 May 1988 (age 38)
- Place of birth: Požarevac, SR Serbia, SFR Yugoslavia
- Height: 1.75 m (5 ft 9 in)
- Position: Winger

Team information
- Current team: RSK Rabrovo

Youth career
- 1995–2004: Mladi Radnik

Senior career*
| Years | Team | Apps | (Gls) |
| 2004–2010 | Mladi Radnik | 140 | (29) |
| 2005 | → Trgovački (loan) | 12 | (3) |
| 2010–2013 | Rad | 65 | (12) |
| 2013–2016 | Partizan | 49 | (9) |
| 2016–2017 | Mladost Lučani | 11 | (0) |
| 2017 | → OFK Beograd (loan) | 15 | (2) |
| 2017–2018 | Temnić | 28 | (5) |
| 2019 | Sloga 33 | 0 | (0) |
| 2020 | Mladi Radnik | | |
| 2021 | Sloga 33 | | |
| 2021 | RSK Rabrovo | | |
| 2022 | Smederevo | | |
| 2022–2023 | Mladi Radnik | | |
| 2023- | RSK Rabrovo | | |
- * Club domestic league appearances and goals as of 19 March 2023

Predrag Luka (Serbian Cyrillic: Пpeдpaг Лукa; born 11 May 1988) is a Serbian footballer who plays as a winger for RSK Rabrovo.

== Club career ==
=== Mladi radnik ===
Luka had played with FK Mladi radnik between 2004 and 2010, having played a total of 140 league matches and scored 29 goals for them. In 2009, he was a part of squad that achieved the greatest success in Mladi radnik history, promotion to SuperLiga. After one year, the club was relegated, and Luka found himself a place in another SuperLiga side, Rad Beograd.

=== Rad ===
He spent three years at the club, where he played 65 matches and scored 12 goals. In May 2011, during the game against Smederevo, his former teammate from Mladi Radnik, Miloš Radosavljević tackled Luka in a manner that broke his leg, which ended up being a season-ending injury.

=== Partizan ===
On February 2, 2013, he signed a 3.5-year contract with Partizan Belgrade upon being promoted with Nemanja Kojić to the club. On August 7, 2013, Luka scored his first goal for Partizan in a 2-0 win against FK Donji Srem.

== Career statistics ==
As of 19 November 2017

| Club | Season | League | | Cup | | Continental | | Total | |
| Club | Season | Apps | Goals | Apps | Goals | Apps | Goals | Apps | Goals |
|---|---|---|---|---|---|---|---|---|---|
| Mladi radnik | 2009–10 | 30 | 5 | 0 | 0 | 0 | 0 | 30 | 5 |
| Mladi radnik | Total | 30 | 5 | 0 | 0 | 0 | 0 | 30 | 5 |
| Rad | 2010–11 | 26 | 6 | 1 | 0 | 0 | 0 | 26 | 6 |
| Rad | 2011–12 | 24 | 2 | 0 | 0 | 0 | 0 | 24 | 2 |
| Rad | 2012–13 | 15 | 4 | 3 | 0 | 0 | 0 | 18 | 4 |
| Rad | Total | 65 | 12 | 3 | 0 | 0 | 0 | 68 | 12 |
| Partizan | 2012–13 | 14 | 3 | 0 | 0 | 0 | 0 | 14 | 3 |
| Partizan | 2013–14 | 27 | 4 | 3 | 1 | 3 | 0 | 33 | 5 |
| Partizan | 2014–15 | 8 | 2 | 3 | 0 | 5 | 0 | 18 | 3 |
| Partizan | 2015–16 | 0 | 0 | 0 | 0 | 0 | 0 | 0 | 0 |
| Partizan | Total | 49 | 9 | 6 | 1 | 8 | 0 | 65 | 11 |
| Mladost Lučani | 2015–16 | 11 | 0 | 0 | 0 | 0 | 0 | 11 | 0 |
| Mladost Lučani | 2016–17 | 0 | 0 | 0 | 0 | 0 | 0 | 0 | 0 |
| Mladost Lučani | Total | 11 | 0 | 0 | 0 | 0 | 0 | 11 | 0 |
| OFK Beograd (loan) | 2016–17 | 15 | 2 | 0 | 0 | 0 | 0 | 15 | 2 |
| OFK Beograd (loan) | Total | 15 | 2 | 0 | 0 | 0 | 0 | 15 | 2 |
| Temnić | 2017–18 | 14 | 4 | 0 | 0 | 0 | 0 | 14 | 4 |
| Career total | | 183 | 32 | 10 | 1 | 8 | 0 | 201 | 33 |

== Honours ==
Partizan Belgrade

- Serbian SuperLiga: 2012–13, 2014–15

== Personal life ==
Luka is Serbian Romani. His family is Serbian Orthodox and has the slava (patron saint) of Parascheva. He was brought up in the Burdelj mala settlement in Požarevac. His favourite team is Partizan.
