= Saša Marković (footballer, born 1991) =

Serbian footballer

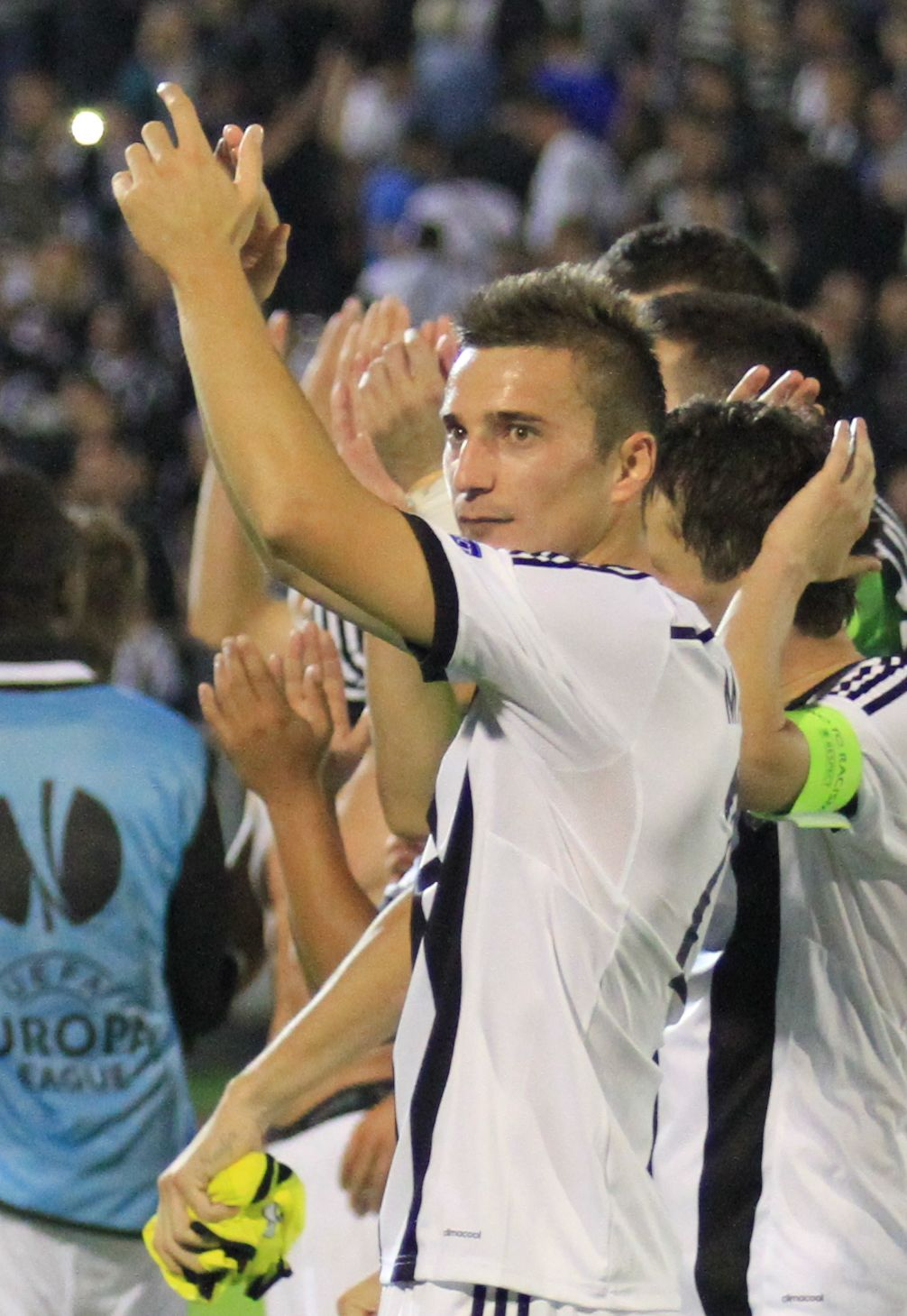
- Marković with Partizan in 2014

Personal information
- Full name: Saša Marković
- Date of birth: 13 March 1991 (age 35)
- Place of birth: Brus, SFR Yugoslavia
- Height: 1.85 m (6 ft 1 in)
- Position: Midfielder

Team information
- Current team: OFK Beograd
- Number: 10

Youth career
- Kopaonik
- Partizan
- 2007–2009: OFK Beograd

Senior career*
Years	Team	Apps	(Gls)
2009–2011	OFK Beograd	49	(4)
2011–2015	Partizan	53	(6)
2015–2018	Córdoba	64	(7)
2018–2022	Apollon	72	(8)
2022	Olympiakos Nicosia	7	(0)
2023	Mladost Novi Sad	16	(1)
2023–	OFK Beograd	60	(11)

International career
2009–2010	Serbia U19	5	(1)
2010–2012	Serbia U21	16	(4)
- * Club domestic league appearances and goals as of 12 June 2026

Saša Marković (Serbian Cyrillic: Саша Марковић; born 13 March 1991) is a Serbian footballer who played as a midfielder for OFK Beograd.

== Club career ==
=== Early career ===
Marković played for youth selections of Kopaonik and Partizan, before moving to OFK Beograd in 2007. He made his first team debut with the Romantics during the 2008–09 season. Marković played 49 league matches, scoring four goals during his stint at Karaburma.

By Serbian FA Sasa Markovic was pronounced as best young player of Serbian Super Liga for year 2011.

=== Partizan ===
On 15 June 2011, it was announced that Marković had signed a four-year contract with Partizan. He scored his first goal for the club in a league match against Borac Čačak on 29 April 2012. He also played all six matches of the 2012–13 UEFA Europa League group stage campaign and scored a skillful goal against Rubin Kazan, after which he celebrated by dancing to the rhythm of Gangnam Style. He scored an amazing goal in 2014-15 UEFA Europa League game against Beşiktaş at the Atatürk Olympic Stadium in Istanbul.

=== Córdoba ===
On 15 June 2015 Marković signed a two-year deal with Córdoba CF.

== International career ==
On 7 September 2010, Marković scored on his debut for the Serbian national under-21 team in their UEFA European Championship qualifier against Cyprus U21. He scored his second goal in a friendly match against Bulgaria U21 on 25 March 2011.

== Career statistics ==
As of 11 May 2021

Club	Season	League		Cup		Continental		Total	
Club	Season	Apps	Goals	Apps	Goals	Apps	Goals	Apps	Goals
OFK Beograd	2008–09	3	0	0	0	0	0	3	0
OFK Beograd	2009–10	21	4	3	1	0	0	24	5
OFK Beograd	2010–11	25	0	0	0	3	0	28	0
OFK Beograd	Total	49	4	3	1	3	0	55	5
Partizan	2011–12	8	1	2	0	2	0	12	1
Partizan	2012–13	17	2	2	0	11	2	30	4
Partizan	2013–14	11	1	3	0	6	1	20	2
Partizan	2014–15	17	2	4	1	5	1	25	4
Partizan	Total	53	6	11	1	24	4	88	11
Córdoba	2015–16	35	3	0	0	—		35	3
Córdoba	2016–17	13	2	1	0	—		14	2
Córdoba	2017–18	16	2	2	2	—		18	4
Córdoba	Total	64	7	3	2	—		67	9
Apollon Limassol	2017–18	11	4	5	1	—		16	5
Apollon Limassol	2018–19	22	2	4	0	13	3	39	5
Apollon Limassol	2019–20	13	1	1	0	8	1	22	2
Apollon Limassol	2020–21	24	1	1	0	2	0	27	1
Apollon Limassol	Total	70	8	11	1	23	4	104	13
Career total		233	25	28	5	50	8	314	38

== Honours ==
Partizan

- Serbian SuperLiga: 2011–12, 2012–13, 2014–15
