= Milan Obradović =

Serbian footballer and manager

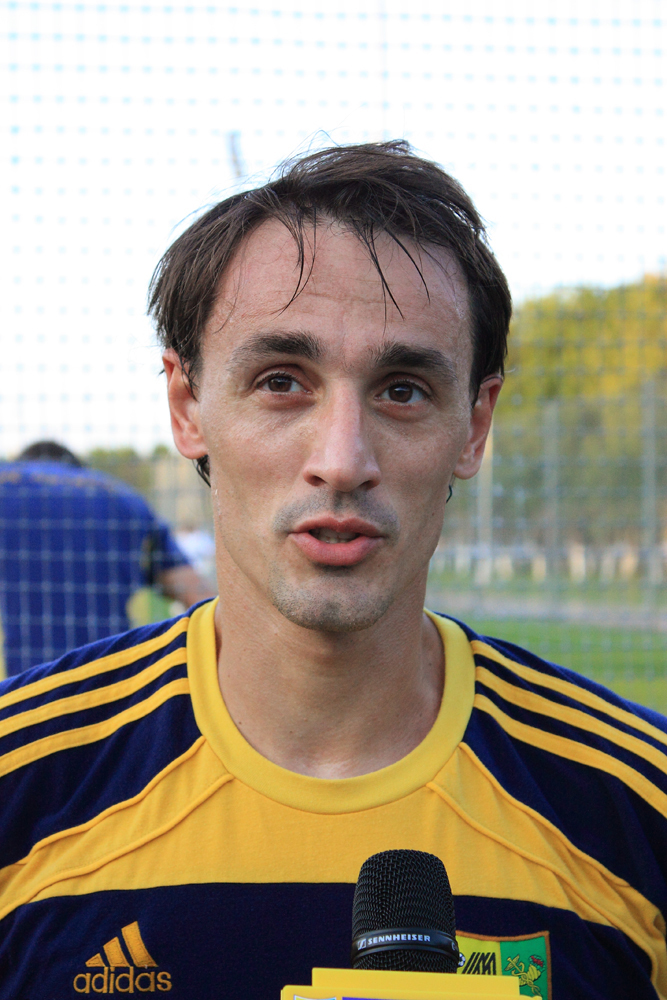
- Obradović with Metalist in 2011

Personal information
- Date of birth: 3 August 1977 (age 49)
- Place of birth: Belgrade, SR Serbia, Yugoslavia
- Height: 1.82 m (5 ft 11 1/2 in)
- Position: Defender

Senior career*
Years	Team	Apps	(Gls)
1996–1998	Radnički Beograd	1	(0)
1998–2001	Obilić	56	(0)
2001–2003	Lokomotiv Moscow	32	(1)
2003–2004	Borussia Mönchengladbach	8	(0)
2005	Radnički Beograd	6	(0)
2005–2006	Akratitos	14	(0)
2006–2013	Metalist Kharkiv	147	(7)
2013	→ Arsenal Kyiv (loan)	11	(0)
2013–2014	Partizan	22	(1)
2014	OFK Beograd	5	(0)
Total		302	(9)

International career
1999–2000	FR Yugoslavia U21	6	(0)
2000–2001	FR Yugoslavia	7	(0)

Managerial career
- 2015: Napredak (assistant)
- 2015–2016: Koper (assistant)
- 2016: Koper
- 2017: Serbia U19
- 2018: Serbia (assistant)
- 2019–2022: Azerbaijan U21
- * Club domestic league appearances and goals

Milan Obradović (Serbian Cyrillic: Милан Обрадовић, pronounced [mǐlan obrǎːdoʋitɕ]; born 3 August 1977) is a Serbian football manager and former professional player who played as a defender.

== Club career ==
Obradović made his senior debut with Radnički Beograd in the mid-1990s, before moving to Obilić in the 1998–99 season. While playing for the Knights, Obradović established himself as one of the best defenders in the league. In the summer of 2001, Obradović was transferred to Russian club Lokomotiv Moscow.

Obradović played seven seasons for Ukrainian club Metalist Kharkiv from 2006 to 2013, spending the last six months of his contract on loan at Arsenal Kyiv.

On 23 July 2013, Obradović signed a one-year contract with Partizan. On 27 July 2014, Obradović signed with OFK Beograd.

== International career ==
Between 2000 and 2001, Obradović was a regular member of the Yugoslavia national team, making seven appearances. Previously, Obradović played for the Yugoslav national under-21 team in the unsuccessful qualification campaign for the 2000 UEFA Under-21 Championship under Milovan Đorić.

== Coaching career ==
Obradović retired in January 2015 and immediately became the assistant manager of Slavko Matić at FK Napredak Kruševac. It lasted until 25 May 2015, where the duo was fired.

Obradović continued alongside Slavko Matić and became his assistant at Slovenian club FC Koper in October 2015. On 22 March 2016, he then became the manager of Slovenian club FC Koper. The club decided to change manage on 26 September 2016 which meant, that Obradović left the club.

On 18 February 2017, Obradović was presented as the new manager of the Serbian U19 national team. In May 2017, Obradović found an agreement with FK Spartak Subotica and the club announced him as the new manager from the new season. Only few days later it came out, that Obradović had called the management of the club to tell them, that he had accepted a more lucrative offer from another club. However, the deal was only a verbal agreement and never became official.

At the end of January 2018, Obradović was hired as the assistant manager of the Serbia national team. About one year later, on 11 January 2019, Obradovic became the manager of the Azerbaijanian U21 national team.

== Statistics ==
Club	Season	League	
Club	Season	Apps	Goals
Obilić	1998–99	3	0
Obilić	1999–00	29	0
Obilić	2000–01	24	0
Obilić	Total	56	0
