= 2008–09 FK Partizan season =

Partizan
2008–09 season
- President: Dragan Đurić
- Head coach: Slaviša Jokanović
- Serbian SuperLiga: Winners
- Serbian Cup: Winners
- UEFA Champions League: Third qualifying round
- UEFA Cup: Group stage (5th)
- Top goalscorer: League: Diarra (19 goals); All: Diarra (22 goals)
- Highest home attendance: 23,780 v Sampdoria (23 October 2008)
- Lowest home attendance: 1,822 v Jagodina (12 November 2008)

The 2008–09 season was FK Partizan's 3rd season in Serbian SuperLiga. This article shows player statistics and all matches (official and friendly) that the club played during the 2008–09 season.

== Tournaments ==
	Competition	Position
(Serbia)	Serbian SuperLiga	Winners
(Serbia)	Serbian Cup	Winners
(European Union)	UEFA Champions League	Third qualifying round
(European Union)	UEFA Cup	Group stage

== Players ==
=== Squad information ===
Note: Flags indicate national team as defined under FIFA eligibility rules; some limited exceptions apply. Players may hold more than one non-FIFA nationality.

No.	Pos.	Nation	Player
1	GK	MNE	Darko Božović
2	DF	SRB	Bogdan Stević
3	DF	SRB	Ivan Stevanović
4	DF	SRB	Nenad Đorđević (captain)
5	MF	SRB	Ljubomir Fejsa
7	MF	SRB	Nemanja Tomić
8	MF	BRA	Juca
10	MF	POR	Almami Moreira
13	DF	SRB	Marko Jovanović
16	MF	SVN	Danijel Marčeta
17	FW	SRB	Miloš Bogunović
19	FW	SRB	Brana Ilić
20	MF	SRB	Radosav Petrović

No.	Pos.	Nation	Player
22	MF	SRB	Adem Ljajić
24	DF	SRB	Srđa Knežević
25	FW	BRA	Washington
26	FW	SEN	Lamine Diarra
27	GK	MNE	Mladen Božović
30	GK	SRB	Aleksandar Radosavljević
31	DF	SRB	Rajko Brežančić
33	DF	BIH	Aleksandar Kosorić
37	MF	SRB	Ivan Obradović
52	DF	SRB	Goran Gavrančić
77	MF	MNE	Nikola Vujović
81	DF	SRB	Milovan Sikimić

== Competitions ==
=== Overview ===
Competition	Record							
Competition	P	W	D	L	GF	GA	GD	Win %
Superliga	33	25	5	3	63	15	+48	75.76
Serbian Cup	5	5	0	0	14	2	+12	100.00
UEFA Cup	10	3	2	5	10	14	−4	30.00
Total	48	33	7	8	87	31	+56	68.75

==== League table ====
Pos	Team	Pld	W	D	L	GF	GA	GD	Pts	Qualification or relegation
1	Partizan (C)	33	25	5	3	63	15	+48	80	Qualification for Champions League second qualifying round
2	Vojvodina	33	18	7	8	46	25	+21	61	Qualification for Europa League third qualifying round (Note: Because the Cup winners Partizan qualified for the 2009–10 UEFA Champions League, the losing Cup finalists, First League club Sevojno, qualified for the second qualifying round of the UEFA Europa League. Therefore, the league runner-up will qualify for the third qualifying round of the UEFA Europa League.)
3	Red Star Belgrade	33	17	8	8	59	32	+27	59	Qualification for Europa League second qualifying round
4	Javor Ivanjica	33	13	14	6	39	27	+12	53	
5	Borac Čačak	33	9	13	11	28	35	−7	40	

Source: soccerway.com
Rules for classification: 1) points; 2) goal difference; 3) number of goals scored.
(C) Champions

==== Matches ====
Date	Round	Opponents	Ground	Result	Scorers
17 August 2008	1	Banat	H	1 – 0	Tošić 67'
22 August 2008	2	Napredak	H	3 – 1	Paunović 40', Diarra 63', Bogunović 90'
31 August 2008	3	OFK Beograd	A	3 – 0	Tošić 29', 90', Đorđević 49'
13 September 2008	4	Borac Čačak	H	2 – 0	Stevanović 44', Moreira 66'
21 September 2008	5	Rad	A	3 – 0	Diarra 9', Tošić 10', 64'
27 September 2008	6	Vojvodina	H	1 – 0	Moreira 56'
5 October 2008	7	Crvena zvezda	A	2 – 0	Diarra 56', Juca 90'
18 October 2008	8	Javor	H	2 – 2	Diarra 73', Tošić 77'
26 October 2008	9	Čukarički	A	0 – 1	–
29 October 2008	10	Jagodina	H	2 – 0	Diarra 12', Moreira 67'
1 November 2008	11	Hajduk Kula	A	1 – 1	Diarra 25'
9 November 2008	12	Banat	A	2 – 0	Bogunović 70', Diarra 90+2'
15 November 2008	13	Napredak	A	4 – 0	Bogunović 8', Moreira 27', 37', Diarra 66'
23 November 2008	14	OFK Beograd	H	5 – 1	Bogunović 16', Diarra 22', 49', 69', Ljajić 51'
30 November 2008	15	Borac Čačak	A	0 – 1	–
6 December 2008	16	Rad	H	1 – 1	Ljajić 17'
10 December 2008	17	Vojvodina	A	0 – 0	–
28 February 2009	18	Crvena zvezda	H	1 – 1	Moreira 90+5'
7 March 2009	19	Javor	A	1 – 0	Diarra 67'
14 March 2009	20	Čukarički	H	2 – 0	Juca 29', Tomić 84'
18 March 2009	21	Jagodina	A	1 – 0	Ilić 83'
21 March 2009	22	Hajduk Kula	H	3 – 0	Moreira 38', Diarra 67', 81'
4 April 2009	23	Banat	H	1 – 0	Tomić 45'
8 April 2009	24	Crvena zvezda	H	2 – 0	Diarra 12', Vujović 81'
12 April 2009	25	Vojvodina	A	2 – 0	Diarra 53', Moreira 70'
18 April 2009	26	Javor	H	1 – 0	Knežević 65'
23 April 2009	27	Borac Čačak	A	2 – 0	Ljajić 68', Diarra 77'
26 April 2009	28	OFK Beograd	H	4 – 1	Ljajić 34', Washington 71', 80', Diarra 84'
3 May 2009	29	Hajduk Kula	A	2 – 1	Ljajić 2', Washington 69'
10 May 2009	30	Jagodina	H	1 – 2	Washington 65'
16 May 2009	31	Rad	A	5 – 1	Bogunović 12', 90', Vujović 46', 90', Ilić 70'
23 May 2009	32	Napredak	H	2 – 1	Moreira 40', Diarra 70'
30 May 2009	33	Čukarički	A	1 – 0	Petrović 70'

=== Serbian Cup ===
Date	Round	Opponents	Ground	Result	Scorers
24 September 2008	1/16	Mladost Apatin	A	2 – 0	Diarra 35', Čadikovski 70'
12 November 2008	1/8	Jagodina	H	4 – 2	Moreira 33', 36', Mihajlović 41' (o.g.), Tošić 90'
15 April 2009	1/4	Hajduk Beograd	A	4 – 0	Bogunović 17', 23', Washington 27', Ljajić 29'
6 May 2009	1/2	Banat	H	1 – 0	Stevanović 41'
21 May 2009	Final	Sevojno	H	3 – 0	Đorđević 61', Stevanović 85', Petrović 89'

=== UEFA Champions League ===
==== Qualifying phase ====
29 July 2008 2nd qualifying round 1st leg	Inter Baku (Azerbaijan)	1–1	(Serbia) Partizan	Baku, Azerbaijan
16:00	Zlatinov 84'	Report	Bogunović 4'	Stadium: Tofiq Bahramov Stadium; Attendance: 8,500; Referee: Tomasz Mikulski (Poland)

6 August 2008 2nd qualifying round 2nd leg	Partizan (Serbia)	2–0 (3–1 agg.)	(Azerbaijan) Inter Baku	Belgrade, Serbia
20:45	Juca 61'; Diarra 83'	Report		Stadium: Partizan Stadium; Attendance: 19,221; Referee: César Muñiz Fernández (Spain)

13 August 2008 3rd qualifying round 1st leg	Partizan (Serbia)	2–2	(Turkey) Fenerbahçe	Belgrade, Serbia
21:00	Paunović 10'; Bogunović 14'	Report	Alex 45' (pen.); Güiza 50'	Stadium: Partizan Stadium; Attendance: 22,274; Referee: Craig Thomson (Scotland)

27 August 2008 3rd qualifying round 2nd leg	Fenerbahçe (Turkey)	2–1 (4–3 agg.)	(Serbia) Partizan	Istanbul, Turkey
20:00	Şentürk 28'; Alex 58'	Report	Tošić 76'	Stadium: Şükrü Saracoğlu Stadium; Attendance: 36,675; Referee: Manuel Mejuto González (Spain)

=== UEFA Cup ===
==== First round ====
18 September 2008 First Round 1st leg	Timișoara (Romania)	1–2	(Serbia) Partizan	Timișoara, Romania
19:45 CET	Bucur 25'		Tošić 35'; Bogunović 69'	Stadium: Stadionul Dan Păltinișanu; Attendance: 20,000; Referee: Zsolt Szabó (Hungary)

2 October 2008 First Round 2nd leg	Partizan (Serbia)	1–0 (3–1 agg.)	(Romania) Timișoara	Belgrade, Serbia
19:00 CET	Stevanović 70'			Stadium: Stadion Partizana; Attendance: 15,623; Referee: Bruno Paixão (Portugal)

==== Group stage ====
Pos	Team	Pld	W	D	L	GF	GA	GD	Pts	Qualification	STD	STU	SAM	SEV	PTZ
1	(Belgium) Standard Liège	4	3	0	1	5	3	+2	9	Advance to knockout stage	—	—	3–0	1–0	—
2	(Germany) VfB Stuttgart	4	2	1	1	6	3	+3	7	Advance to knockout stage	3–0	—	—	—	2–0
3	(Italy) Sampdoria	4	2	1	1	4	5	−1	7	Advance to knockout stage	—	1–1	—	1–0	—
4	(Spain) Sevilla	4	2	0	2	5	2	+3	6		—	2–0	—	—	3–0
5	(Serbia) Partizan	4	0	0	4	1	8	−7	0		0–1	—	1–2	—	—

Source: RSSSF

23 October 2008 1	Partizan (Serbia)	1–2	(Italy) Sampdoria	Belgrade, Serbia
21:00	Diarra 34'	Report	Bonazzoli 20'; Dessena 55'	Stadium: Partizan Stadium; Attendance: 23,780; Referee: Lucílio Batista (Portugal)

6 November 2008 2	Stuttgart (Germany)	2–0	(Serbia) Partizan	Stuttgart, Germany
18:00	Gómez 77', 80'	Report		Stadium: Mercedes-Benz Arena; Attendance: 20,500; Referee: Pavel Kralovec (Czech Republic)

27 November 2008 3	Partizan (Serbia)	0–1	(Belgium) Standard Liège	Belgrade, Serbia
20:45		Report	De Camargo 36'	Stadium: Partizan Stadium; Attendance: 14,210; Referee: Mike Dean (England)

3 December 2008 4	Sevilla (Spain)	3–0	(Serbia) Partizan	Seville, Spain
20:45	Luís Fabiano 32' (pen.), 73'; Renato 46'	Report		Stadium: Ramón Sánchez Pizjuán Stadium; Attendance: 20,500; Referee: Vladimír Hriňák (Slovakia)

== Friendlies ==
Date	Opponents	Ground	Result	Scorers
12 July 2008	(Romania) Rapid București	N	1 – 1	Bogunović 61'
14 July 2008	(Brazil) Botafogo	N	1 – 2	Diarra 25'
16 July 2008	(Switzerland) Grasshoppers	N	1 – 3	Čadikovski 75'
18 July 2008	(Israel) Beitar Jerusalem	N	2 – 2	Paunović 30', Đorđević 85'
23 July 2008	(France) Lyon	H	1 – 3	Moreira 37'
7 September 2008	(Greece) PAOK	A	1 – 3	Perić 26'
24 January 2009	(Austria) Red Bull Salzburg	N	4 – 2	Ljajić 11', Fejsa 41', Diarra 43', Washington 90'
27 January 2009	(Romania) CFR Cluj	N	0 – 1	
30 January 2009	(Poland) GKS Bełchatów	N	1 – 0	Vujović 4'
7 February 2009	(Montenegro) Budućnost Podgorica	N	0 – 1	
10 February 2009	(Japan) Sanfrecce Hiroshima	N	2 – 1	Ilić 4', Juca 67'
12 February 2009	(North Macedonia) Makedonija Gjorče Petrov	N	0 – 0	
