= 2008–09 Serbian SuperLiga =

3rd season of Serbian SuperLiga

Jelen SuperLiga
- Season: 2008–09
- Champions: Partizan; 2nd SuperLiga title 21st domestic title
- Relegated: Banat Zrenjanin
- Champions League: Partizan
- Europa League: Vojvodina; Red Star
- Matches: 198
- Goals: 420 (2.12 per match)
- Top goalscorer: Lamine Diarra (19)
- Biggest home win: Vojvodina 6–1 OFK Beograd (9 May 2009)
- Biggest away win: Jagodina 1–5 Red Star (16 May 2009); Rad 1–5 Partizan (16 May 2009)
- Highest scoring: Čukarički 4–4 Vojvodina (8 April 2009)

The 2008–09 Serbian SuperLiga (known as the Jelen SuperLiga for sponsorship reasons) was the third season of the league since its establishment in 2006. It began on 16 August 2008 and ended on 30 May 2009. Partizan successfully defended their title.

== Team changes from 2007–08 ==
FK Bežanija were relegated to the Serbian First League after finishing in 12th place. Promoted from the First League were champions FK Javor Ivanjica and runners-up FK Jagodina.

FK Smederevo, having finished in 10th place, had to play a two-legged play-off against the fourth-placed team from the First League, FK Rad. Rad won 4–3 on aggregate and thus were promoted to the SuperLiga while Smederevo were also relegated.

FK Mladost Lučani declined their participation for the 2008–09 season due to financial problems on 2 July 2008. The spot left behind by Mladost was given to 11th placed (second to last) FK Banat Zrenjanin by the Serbian Football Association on the basis that the club has "better sponsors and more committed community support" than the other candidate for a free spot – FK Smederevo. This drew protests from FK Smederevo management who thought that their club has a better claim to stay in SuperLiga for the 2008–09 season based on their 2007–08 league finish. They even launched an official complaint with UEFA, but the answer they got was that UEFA stands by the Serbian Football Association's decision.

=== Future changes ===
At the end of the 2007–08 season several SuperLiga clubs, most notably FK Bežanija, proposed an expansion of the league from 12 to 16 teams for 2008–09. The FSS board rejected that proposal. However, it was decided that the 2009–10 season will feature 16 teams. Only one team will be directly relegated, while five First League clubs will be directly promoted.

== Stadia and locations ==
Location of teams in the Serbian SuperLiga 2008–09

Team	City	Stadium	Capacity
Banat	Zrenjanin	Karađorđev Park Stadium	13,500
Borac	Čačak	Čačak Stadium	6,000
Čukarički	Čukarica, Belgrade	Čukarički Stadium	5,000
Hajduk	Kula	Stadion Hajduk	11,000
FK Jagodina	Jagodina	Stadion FK Jagodina	15,000
Javor	Ivanjica	Ivanjica Stadium	5,000
Napredak	Kruševac	Stadion Mladost	10,811
OFK Beograd	Belgrade	Omladinski Stadium	13,912
Partizan	Belgrade	Partizan Stadium	32,887
Rad	Belgrade	Stadion Kralj Petar I	6,000
Red Star	Belgrade	Stadion Crvena Zvezda	55,000
FK Vojvodina	Novi Sad	Karađorđe Stadium	15,000

== League table ==
Pos	Team	Pld	W	D	L	GF	GA	GD	Pts	Qualification or relegation
1	Partizan (C)	33	25	5	3	63	15	+48	80	Qualification for Champions League second qualifying round
2	Vojvodina	33	18	7	8	46	25	+21	61	Qualification for Europa League third qualifying round (Note: Because the Cup winners Partizan qualified for the 2009–10 UEFA Champions League, the losing Cup finalists, First League club Sevojno, qualified for the second qualifying round of the UEFA Europa League. Therefore, the league runner-up will qualify for the third qualifying round of the UEFA Europa League.)
3	Red Star Belgrade	33	17	8	8	59	32	+27	59	Qualification for Europa League second qualifying round
4	Javor Ivanjica	33	13	14	6	39	27	+12	53	
5	Borac Čačak	33	9	13	11	28	35	−7	40	
6	Napredak Kruševac	33	10	8	15	28	37	−9	38	
7	Hajduk Kula	33	9	11	13	23	34	−11	38	
8	Rad	33	7	15	11	27	35	−8	36	
9	Čukarički	33	9	8	16	30	39	−9	35	
10	Jagodina	33	10	4	19	28	47	−19	34	
11	OFK Beograd	33	8	9	16	28	54	−26	33	
12	Banat Zrenjanin (R)	33	7	10	16	21	40	−19	31	Relegation to Serbian First League

Source: soccerway.com
Rules for classification: 1) points; 2) goal difference; 3) number of goals scored.
(C) Champions; (R) Relegated

== Results ==
The schedule consists of three rounds. During the first two rounds, each team played each other once home and away for a total of 22 matches. The pairings of the third round were then set according to the standings after the first two rounds, giving every team a third game against each opponent for a total of 33 games per team.

=== First and second round ===
Home \ Away	BAN	BOR	ČUK	HAJ	JAG	JAV	NAP	OFK	PAR	RAD	RSB	VOJ
Banat Zrenjanin		0–0	0–0	1–0	1–2	2–0	0–0	4–2	0–2	1–1	0–0	0–1
Borac Čačak	1–2		0–0	0–0	2–1	1–1	2–2	2–1	1–0	1–1	1–0	1–1
Čukarički	3–0	0–1		2–1	4–1	1–3	0–1	0–1	1–0	2–1	2–2	0–1
Hajduk Kula	1–1	2–0	1–0		0–0	1–1	1–0	0–0	1–1	2–0	1–2	1–2
Jagodina	2–0	1–1	1–2	1–0		3–2	1–0	2–0	0–1	0–0	1–4	0–1
Javor Ivanjica	3–0	2–2	0–0	1–1	2–1		2–1	1–0	0–1	1–0	1–1	1–0
Napredak Kruševac	2–0	1–1	2–0	0–1	1–1	3–1		0–1	0–4	1–1	1–2	2–1
OFK Beograd	1–0	1–1	2–0	2–0	1–0	0–1	0–2		0–3	0–1	2–2	2–1
Partizan	1–0	2–0	2–0	3–0	2–0	2–2	3–1	5–1		1–1	1–1	1–0
Rad	1–1	0–2	3–0 (Note: The game of Round 13 was awarded to Rad with a score of 3–0 because Čukarički had been suspended by the league committee over unpaid debts to former player Mirko Poledica.)	1–1	0–1	0–0	2–0	0–0	0–3		0–0	1–0
Red Star Belgrade	2–1	2–0	2–0	1–2	3–0	0–2	4–0	5–1	0–2	2–0		3–1
Vojvodina	2–0	1–0	2–1	2–0	3–0	1–0	1–0	1–1	0–0	0–1	2–0	

Source: soccerway.com
Legend: Blue = home team win; Yellow = draw; Red = away team win.

=== Third round ===
Key numbers for pairing determination (number marks position after 22 games):

Round 23	Round 24	Round 25	Round 26	Round 27	Round 28	Round 29	Round 30	Round 31	Round 32	Round 33
1–12	1 – 2	3 – 1	1 – 4	5 – 1	1 – 6	7 – 1	1 – 8	9 – 1	1 – 10	11 – 1
2–11	11–3	2–12	2 – 3	4 – 2	2 – 5	6 – 2	2 – 7	8 – 2	2 – 9	10 – 2
3–10	10–4	4–11	11–5	3–12	3 – 4	5 – 3	3 – 6	7 – 3	3 – 8	9 – 3
4 – 9	9 – 5	5–10	10–6	6–11	11–7	4–12	4 – 5	6 – 4	4 – 7	8 – 4
5 – 8	8 – 6	6 – 9	9 – 7	7–10	10–8	8–11	11 – 9	5 – 12	5 – 6	7 – 5
6 – 7	12–7	7 – 8	12–8	8 – 9	12–9	9–10	12–10	10–11	12–11	6 – 12

Home \ Away	BAN	BOR	ČUK	HAJ	JAG	JAV	NAP	OFK	PAR	RAD	RSB	VOJ
Banat Zrenjanin			0–0	1–0	2–0		1–0			0–0		
Borac Čačak	2–0				1–0		1–2	2–1	0–2			0–3 (Note: The match was registered with a score of 0–3 due to Borac's use of ineligible player.)
Čukarički		0–0		2–0					0–1	0–1		4–4
Hajduk Kula		2–1			1–0		1–0		1–2			0–0
Jagodina			1–2			1–2		2–0		2–1	1–5	
Javor Ivanjica	1–1	1–1	2–0	3–0						1–1	1–0	
Napredak Kruševac			0–0		1–0	0–0		1–0			2–2	
OFK Beograd	2–1		1–3	0–0		1–1				0–2	1–1	
Partizan	1–0				1–2	1–0	2–1	4–1			2–0	
Rad		1–0		1–1			0–1		1–5			2–2
Red Star Belgrade	3–0	2–0	2–1	3–0						3–2		0–1
Vojvodina	4–1				1–0	0–0	1–0	6–1	0–2			

Source: soccerway.com
Legend: Blue = home team win; Yellow = draw; Red = away team win.

== Top scorers ==
Rank	Player	Team	Goals
1	(Senegal) Lamine Diarra	Partizan	19
2	(Serbia) Nenad Milijaš	Red Star Belgrade	18
3	(Serbia) Dragan Mrđa	Vojvodina	13
4	(Serbia) Nikola Simić	Javor Ivanjica	12
5	(Portugal) Almami Moreira	Partizan	9
5	(Uganda) Eugene Sepuya	Čukarički	9
5	(Serbia) Dušan Tadić	Vojvodina	9

Source: superliga.rs

=== Hat-tricks ===
Player	For	Against	Result	Date
(Senegal) Lamine Diarra	Partizan	OFK Beograd	5–1	23 November 2008
(Serbia) Dragan Mrđa	Vojvodina	OFK Beograd	6–1	9 May 2009
(Serbia) Nenad Milijaš	Jagodina	Red Star	1–5	16 May 2009

== Awards ==
=== Player of the Year ===
Nenad Milijaš and Almami Moreira both received the same number of votes therefore they both share the title as co-winners.

=== Team of the Year ===
The All Star team was voted on at the end of the season by the 12 coaches of each SuperLiga team. Almami Moreira was the only player to receive all 12 votes.

Serbian SuperLiga Team of the Year

GK	Mladen Božović	Partizan
RB	Ivan Stevanović	Partizan
CB	Nenad Đorđević	Partizan
CB	Boban Dmitrović	Borac Čačak
LB	Ivan Obradović	Partizan
DM	Ljubomir Fejsa	Partizan
RM	Nemanja Tomić	Partizan
CM	Nenad Milijaš	Red Star
LM	Ognjen Koroman	Red Star
AM	Almami Moreira	Partizan
ST	Lamine Diarra	Partizan

== Champion squad ==
1.	FK Partizan
	Goalkeepers: (Montenegro) Mladen Božović (33); Defenders: Ivan Obradović (29); Ivan Stevanović (26/1); Srđa Knežević (24/1); Nenad Đorđević (22/1); Marko Jovanović (16); Goran Gavrančić (12); Rajko Brežančić (7); (Bosnia and Herzegovina) Aleksandar Kosorić (2); Milovan Sikimić (2); Bogdan Stević (1). Midfielders: Ljubomir Fejsa (27); (Portugal) Almami Moreira (27/9); Adem Ljajić (24/5); Radosav Petrović (21/1); (Brazil) Juca (18/2); Nemanja Tomić (14/2); (Montenegro) Nikola Vujović (11/3); (Slovenia) Danijel Marčeta (2); Branko Mihajlović (1); Vojkan Miljković (1). Forwards: Miloš Bogunović (32/6); (Senegal) Lamine Diarra (29/19); (Brazil) Washington (12/4); Brana Ilić (11/2); Aleksandar Đoković (1). (league appearances and goals listed in brackets) Manager: Slaviša Jokanović. On the roster but have not played in a league game: (Montenegro) Darko Božović; Aleksandar Radosavljević. Transferred out during the season: Vladimir Branković (on loan to Sevojno); (Montenegro) Nenad Brnović (on loan to Rad); (North Macedonia) Dragan Čadikovski (to Incheon); Đorđe Lazić (to Metalurh); Nenad Marinković (to Teleoptik); Aleksandar Miljković (to Teleoptik); (Cameroon) Alexis N'Gambi (to Daugava); Veljko Paunović (retired); Milan Perić (on loan to Jagodina); Zoran Tošić (to Manchester United); (Tunisia) Kamel Zaiem (to Al-Khor).
