= Lamine Diarra =

Senegalese footballer

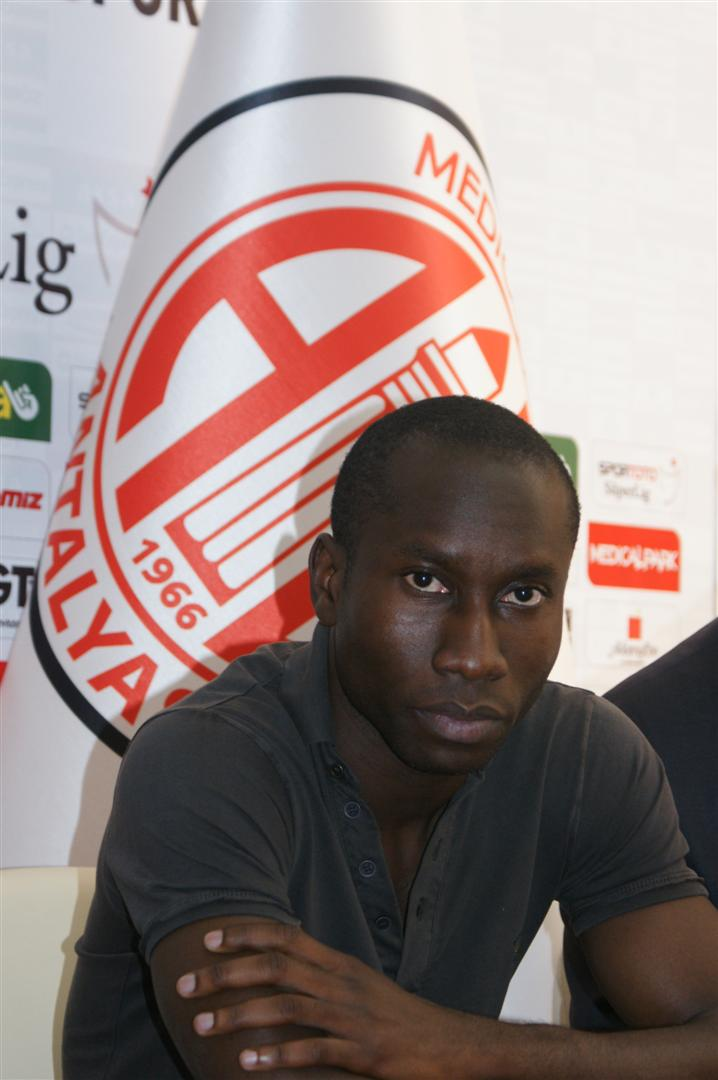
- Diarra with Antalyaspor in 2012

Personal information
- Full name: Lamine Diarra
- Date of birth: 20 December 1983 (age 42)
- Place of birth: Bignona, Senegal
- Height: 1.75 m (5 ft 9 in)
- Position: Striker

Senior career*
Years	Team	Apps	(Gls)
2001–2003	Dakar UC		
2003–2005	Jeanne d'Arc		
2005–2007	Zrinjski Mostar	27	(12)
2007	→ Beira-Mar (loan)	5	(0)
2007–2012	Partizan	112	(56)
2010–2011	→ Al Shabab (loan)	8	(3)
2012–2017	Antalyaspor	104	(38)
2016	→ Göztepe (loan)	14	(3)
2017–2019	Elazığspor	52	(18)
Total		322	(130)

International career
2009	Senegal	1	(0)
- * Club domestic league appearances and goals

Lamine Diarra (born 20 December 1983) is a Senegalese former professional footballer who played as a striker. He was capped once for Senegal at full level besides representing the country at the under-23 level.

Nicknamed Black Mamba and Mamba Di, due to his speed and clinical finishing, Diarra is best remembered for his time at Partizan and Antalyaspor.

== Club career ==
=== Early career ===
Born in Bignona, Diarra began his senior career with Dakar UC, becoming the Senegal Premier League top scorer with nine goals in the 2002–03 season. He subsequently moved to Jeanne d'Arc, partnering Dame N'Doye on the team that reached the CAF Champions League semi-finals during the 2004 campaign. Diarra was the team's highest scorer with six goals in the process.

In the second half of 2005, Diarra was acquired by Bosnia and Herzegovina club Zrinjski Mostar. He was initially unable to play competitive football due to paperwork issues, which lasted for several months. However, after obtaining the certificate, Diarra was cleared to debut for the club, making 13 league appearances and netting four goals in the second half of the 2005–06 season. He improved his numbers in the fall of 2006, scoring nine goals in 17 games across all competitions. In early 2007, Diarra was loaned to Portuguese club Beira-Mar until the end of the season.

=== Partizan ===
On 4 July 2007, Diarra signed a three-year contract with Partizan and was given the number 26 shirt. He made his competitive debut for the side in a UEFA Cup qualifier against his former club Zrinjski Mostar on 19 July, scoring a hat-trick in a 6–1 away victory. On 16 April 2008, Diarra netted a brace in the Serbian Cup semi-final in what would be an eventual 3–2 away success over Red Star Belgrade. He later scored all three goals in the competition's final, a 3–0 win over Zemun. Throughout the league campaign, Diarra confirmed himself as one of the club's key players, along with two other foreign reinforcements, Juca and Almami Moreira, scoring 12 goals in 31 fixtures, as Partizan won the title after three years. He was also the team's overall top scorer with 20 goals across all competitions and signed a two-year extension to his contract.

On 6 August 2008, Diarra scored his first goal of the season in a 2–0 home win over Inter Baku in the second leg of the UEFA Champions League second qualifying round. He also netted a goal in a 2–1 victory over their crosstown rivals Red Star Belgrade on 5 October. Diarra continued his good form by equalizing the score versus Sampdoria in the UEFA Cup group stage, on 24 October, however Partizan would go on to lose the game 2–1. He made his 50th league appearance for Partizan on 7 March 2009, scoring the winning goal in a 1–0 win against Javor Ivanjica. In addition to helping the club defend the double, Diarra became the Serbian SuperLiga top scorer with 19 goals. He was also one of eight Partizan players named in the league's Best XI.

On 1 November 2009, Diarra made his 100th competitive appearance for the club in a league game versus Napredak Kruševac, which Partizan won 3–1. He subsequently scored the opening goal in an eventual 2–1 away victory against Red Star Belgrade on 28 November. Diarra also netted the winning goal to give his team a 1–0 home win over Shakhtar Donetsk in the last game of the UEFA Europa League group stage on 16 December. He later bagged a hat-trick in the final round of the domestic league on 16 May 2010, a 6–0 home win over Mladi Radnik to clinch their third consecutive title. During his third season at Partizan, Diarra appeared in 43 games and tallied 21 goals across all competitions.

==== Loan to Al Shabab ====
On 27 June 2010, it was announced that Diarra would be joining Al Shabab on a season-long loan. He scored his first competitive goal for the club on 3 September in the second round of the UAE Pro League, a 2–0 away win over Dubai CSC. On 27 October, in a league game against Al Wahda, Diarra suffered a fracture in his lower left leg, spending the rest of the season in the process of recovering. He failed to make any more appearances for Al Shabab, before returning to Partizan in June 2011.

==== Return to Partizan ====
After completing his loan spell, Diarra returned to Serbia and made his first appearance back for Partizan in a 5–0 home win over Novi Pazar on 13 August 2011. He came on as a substitute in the 74th minute, receiving a standing ovation upon his introduction. On 28 August, Diarra bagged a brace in a 3–0 home win over OFK Beograd. He also netted two goals versus Jagodina on 17 March 2012, as Partizan won 4–0. Two weeks later, Diarra scored a brace against Rad, becoming the league's joint all-time leading scorer with 52 goals. He played his last match for Partizan on 20 May, scoring the team's only goal in a 1–0 home win over Metalac Gornji Milanovac, celebrating his fourth league title. In his four seasons at Partizan, Diarra amassed 151 official appearances and scored 75 goals across all competitions.

=== Antalyaspor ===
In the 2012 summer transfer window, Diarra signed a two-year contract with Turkish club Antalyaspor on a free transfer. He immediately established himself as the club's leading striker, scoring 13 league goals in his debut Süper Lig season, missing only one out of 34 matches. In the following 2013–14 campaign, Diarra appeared in all 34 league fixtures and scored 10 goals, as the club suffered relegation to the TFF 1. Lig. He helped them win promotion back to the top flight after only one season, being the team's top scorer with 15 goals in 29 league appearances (plus one goal in three play-offs games).

==== Loan to Göztepe ====
On 1 February 2016, Diarra was loaned to TFF 1. Lig club Göztepe until the end of the 2015–16 season. He scored three times in 14 league games, as the side finished 13th among 18 teams.

=== Later career ===
On 28 January 2017, Diarra signed with TFF 1. Lig side Elazığspor on a one-and-a-half-year contract. He penned a new one-year contract with the club on 31 August 2018.

== International career ==
Diarra represented Senegal with the national under-23 team at the 2003 All-Africa Games. He scored one goal for the side in a 2–1 loss to Zambia, as they exited the tournament in the group stage. Two months later in December, Diarra netted the second goal of a 2–0 home win over Egypt in the Olympic qualifiers. However, Senegal failed to qualify for the final tournament.

On 14 October 2009, Diarra made his full international debut for Senegal after coming on as a 79th-minute substitute for Demba Ba in a 2–0 friendly loss to South Korea.

== Career statistics ==
=== Club ===
Appearances and goals by club, season and competition
Club	Season	League			National Cup		League Cup		Continental		Other		Total	
Club	Season	Division	Apps	Goals	Apps	Goals	Apps	Goals	Apps	Goals	Apps	Goals	Apps	Goals
Zrinjski Mostar	2005–06	Bosnian Premier League	13	4	0	0	—		0	0	—		13	4
Zrinjski Mostar	2006–07	Bosnian Premier League	14	8	1	0	—		2 (Note: Appearances in UEFA Intertoto Cup)	1	—		17	9
Zrinjski Mostar	Total		27	12	1	0	—		2	1	—		30	13
Beira-Mar (loan)	2006–07	Primeira Liga	5	0	1	1	0	0	—		—		6	1
Partizan	2007–08	Serbian SuperLiga	31	12	4	5	—		2 (Note: Appearances in UEFA Cup)	3	—		37	20
Partizan	2008–09	Serbian SuperLiga	29	19	4	1	—		10 (Note: Four appearances and one goal in UEFA Champions League, six appearances and one goal in UEFA Europa League)	2	—		43	22
Partizan	2009–10	Serbian SuperLiga	29	14	4	3	—		10 (Note: Four appearances and two goals in UEFA Champions League, six appearances and two goals in UEFA Europa League)	4	—		43	21
Partizan	2010–11	Serbian SuperLiga	0	0	0	0	—		0	0	—		0	0
Partizan	2011–12	Serbian SuperLiga	23	11	5	1	—		0	0	—		28	12
Partizan	Total		112	56	17	10	—		22	9	—		151	75
Al Shabab (loan)	2010–11	UAE Pro League	8	3	1	1	1	0	0	0	—		10	4
Antalyaspor	2012–13	Süper Lig	33	13	8	5	—		—		—		41	18
Antalyaspor	2013–14	Süper Lig	34	10	7	5	—		—		—		41	15
Antalyaspor	2014–15	TFF 1. Lig	29	15	0	0	—		—		3 (Note: Appearances in 1. Lig play-offs)	1	32	16
Antalyaspor	2015–16	Süper Lig	8	0	5	0	—		—		—		13	0
Antalyaspor	Total		104	38	20	10	—		—		3	1	127	49
Göztepe (loan)	2015–16	TFF 1. Lig	14	3	0	0	—		—		—		14	3
Elazığspor	2016–17	TFF 1. Lig	12	2	0	0	—		—		—		12	2
Elazığspor	2017–18	TFF 1. Lig	17	8	0	0	—		—		—		17	8
Elazığspor	2018–19	TFF 1. Lig	23	8	0	0	—		—		—		23	8
Elazığspor	Total		52	18	0	0	—		—		—		52	18
Career total			322	130	40	22	1	0	24	10	3	1	390	163

=== International ===
Appearances and goals by national team and year
National team	Year	Apps	Goals
Senegal	2009	1	0
Total		1	0

== Honours ==
Partizan

- Serbian SuperLiga: 2007–08, 2008–09, 2009–10, 2011–12
- Serbian Cup: 2007–08, 2008–09

Individual

- Serbian SuperLiga top scorer: 2008–09
- Serbian Cup top scorer: 2007–08
- Serbian SuperLiga Team of the Season: 2008–09
