= Vojkan =

Vojkan (Serbian Cyrillic: Војкан) is a Serbian masculine given name. Notable people with the name include:

- Vojkan Benčić (born 1969), Serbian basketball coach
- Vojkan Borisavljević (1947–2021), Serbian composer and conductor
- Vojkan Krgović (born 1967), Serbian basketball coach
- Vojkan Miljković (born 1991), Serbian footballer
