= Milovan Sikimić =

Serbian footballer

Personal information
- Full name: Milovan Sikimić
- Date of birth: 25 October 1980 (age 46)
- Place of birth: Smederevo, SFR Yugoslavia
- Height: 1.89 m (6 ft 2 in)
- Position: Defender

Youth career
- Sartid Smederevo

Senior career*
Years	Team	Apps	(Gls)
2000–2001	Železničar Smederevo		
2001–2002	Mladenovac		
2002–2007	Guingamp	148	(5)
2007–2009	Partizan	7	(0)
2009–2011	Strasbourg	64	(3)
2011–2012	Apollon Limassol	6	(0)
2012–2015	Strasbourg	81	(3)
2015–2016	Mulhouse	11	(1)
Total		317	(12)
- * Club domestic league appearances and goals

Milovan Sikimić (Serbian Cyrillic: Милован Сикимић; born 25 October 1980) is a Serbian former professional footballer who played as a defender.

With two different clubs (Guingamp and Strasbourg), Sikimić played in the first five levels of the French football league system (Ligue 1, Ligue 2, National, CFA and CFA 2).

He is the older brother of Predrag Sikimić.

== Career ==
After playing with Mladenovac in his country, Sikimić moved abroad to France and signed a three-year contract with Guingamp in June 2002. He immediately became an important part of the team, making over 150 competitive appearances for the club in the following five years.

In July 2007, Sikimić returned to his homeland and signed with Partizan. He was initially a regular member of the team's defensive line. However, due to often injuries, Sikimić made only 12 official appearances for the club in the following two seasons, as Partizan won two doubles.

In July 2009, Sikimić moved back to France and signed with Strasbourg. He was transferred to Cypriot club Apollon Limassol in July 2011. However, after only few months, Sikimić returned to Strasbourg. He also spent one season at Mulhouse, before leaving the club in the summer of 2016.

== Statistics ==
Appearances and goals by club, season and competition
Club	Season	League		Cup		League Cup		Continental		Total	
Club	Season	Apps	Goals	Apps	Goals	Apps	Goals	Apps	Goals	Apps	Goals
Guingamp	2002–03	20	0	1	0	1	0	—		22	0
Guingamp	2003–04	26	2	1	0	0	0	2	0	29	2
Guingamp	2004–05	36	1	2	0	2	2	—		40	3
Guingamp	2005–06	34	2	0	0	4	2	—		38	4
Guingamp	2006–07	32	0	3	0	1	0	—		36	0
Guingamp	Total	148	5	7	0	8	4	2	0	165	9
Partizan	2007–08	5	0	1	0	—		1	0	7	0
Partizan	2008–09	2	0	1	0	—		2	0	5	0
Partizan	Total	7	0	2	0	—		3	0	12	0
Strasbourg	2009–10	27	2	1	0	1	0	—		29	2
Strasbourg	2010–11	37	1	6	0	1	1	—		44	2
Strasbourg	Total	64	3	7	0	2	1	—		73	4
Apollon Limassol	2011–12	6	0	0	0	—		—		6	0
Apollon Limassol	Total	6	0	0	0	—		—		6	0
Strasbourg	2011–12	17	0	0	0	0	0	—		17	0
Strasbourg	2012–13	28	2	4	0	0	0	—		32	2
Strasbourg	2013–14	21	1	1	0	0	0	—		22	1
Strasbourg	2014–15	15	0	4	0	0	0	—		19	0
Strasbourg	Total	81	3	9	0	0	0	—		90	3
Mulhouse	2015–16	11	1	2	0	0	0	—		13	1
Mulhouse	Total	11	1	2	0	0	0	—		13	1
Career total		317	12	27	0	10	5	5	0	359	17

== Honours ==
Partizan

- Serbian SuperLiga: 2007–08, 2008–09
- Serbian Cup: 2007–08, 2008–09

Strasbourg

- CFA: 2012–13 (Group B)
- CFA 2: 2011–12 (Group C)
