= Adem Ljajić =

Serbian footballer (born 1991)

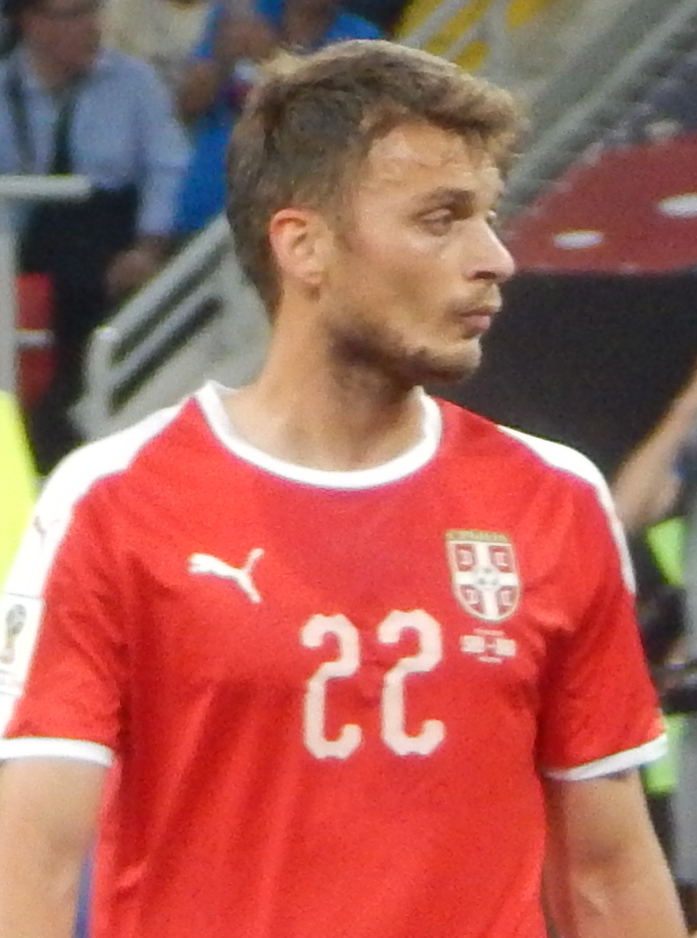
- Ljajić with Serbia at the 2018 FIFA World Cup

Personal information
- Date of birth: 29 September 1991 (age 35)
- Place of birth: Novi Pazar, SR Serbia, SFR Yugoslavia
- Height: 1.82 m (6 ft 0 in)
- Position: Attacking midfielder

Team information
- Current team: Novi Pazar
- Number: 22

Youth career
- Jošanica
- 2005–2008: Partizan

Senior career*
Years	Team	Apps	(Gls)
2008–2010	Partizan	38	(9)
2010–2013	Fiorentina	78	(15)
2013–2016	Roma	61	(14)
2015–2016	→ Inter Milan (loan)	25	(3)
2016–2019	Torino	61	(16)
2018–2019	→ Beşiktaş (loan)	27	(9)
2019–2022	Beşiktaş	46	(7)
2022–2023	Fatih Karagümrük	11	(0)
2023–2025	Novi Pazar	61	(17)
2025–2026	Sarajevo	25	(6)
2026–	Novi Pazar	8	(1)

International career
2007–2008	Serbia U17	9	(1)
2008–2010	Serbia U19	13	(6)
2008–2010	Serbia U21	11	(1)
2010–2020	Serbia	47	(9)
- * Club domestic league appearances and goals as of 8 November 2026

Adem Ljajić (Serbian Cyrillic: Адем Љајић, pronounced [ǎːdem ʎǎːjitɕ]; born 29 September 1991) is a Serbian professional footballer who plays as an attacking midfielder for Serbian SuperLiga club Novi Pazar.

Ljajić began his career with FK Jošanica, and later Partizan, with whom he made his debut in the Serbian SuperLiga and UEFA Champions League. In January 2010, he was set to join England's Manchester United, but the club withdrew its option to sign him in December 2009. Instead, he joined Fiorentina for a reported fee of around €8 million in January 2010. In August 2013, after three years in Florence, Ljajić joined Roma for an €11 million fee, signing a four-year contract. In July 2016, he was sold to Torino. Ljajić was sent on loan to Beşiktaş in 2018, before signing with the Turkish side in 2019. He then joined Fatih Karagümrük in 2022. In September 2023, Ljajić signed with hometown club Novi Pazar. In August 2025, he left Novi Pazar and joined Bosnian side Sarajevo.

Ljajić made his senior international debut for Serbia in 2010. From 2012 to 2014, he was frozen out of the team by manager Siniša Mihajlović for objecting to singing the Serbian national anthem. Ljajić was part of the Serbian squad at the 2018 FIFA World Cup. He earned a total of 47 caps, scoring 9 goals, and his final international was an October 2020 Nations League match against Hungary.

== Club career ==
=== Partizan ===
Born in Novi Pazar in the Serbian region of the Socialist Federal Republic of Yugoslavia, Ljajić joined Partizan at age 14 in 2005, signing from Serbian lower-tier club FK Jošanica. Ljajić was the first player to wear the number 22 for Partizan after Saša Ilić transferred to Galatasaray in 2005. Ljajić made an appearance for Partizan in the first leg of the second qualifying round of the 2008–09 UEFA Champions League on 29 July 2008 as a second-half substitute. He made a second substitute appearance in the second leg and another substitute appearance in the second leg of the third qualifying round. He scored his first competitive goal for Partizan on 23 November 2008 in a league match against OFK Beograd.

In October 2008, Manchester United had given Ljajić a trial, although no information was given about the length of the trial initially. On 2 January 2009, Manchester United announced the signings of both Ljajić and his Partizan teammate, Zoran Tošić. Tošić would join the club immediately while Ljajić would remain at Partizan for the remainder of 2009, joining United in January 2010.

Despite being unable to officially join the club until January 2010, Ljajić made regular trips to Manchester throughout 2009 to train with the United first team, so the club's coaches could monitor his progress. However, United decided not to take up their option to sign Ljajić due to issues surrounding the club's application for a work permit. Following the transfer's collapse, Partizan manager Goran Stevanović claimed the situation had put Ljajić into "psychological shock" but that Ljajić was "handling the situation well". Partizan director of football Ivan Tomić said, "I think that they will regret this decision in future."

=== Fiorentina ===
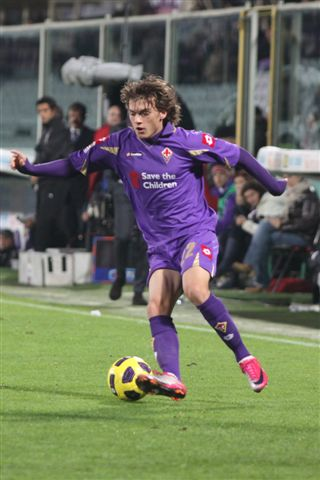
Ljajić playing for Fiorentina in 2010

On 13 January 2010, Italian Serie A club Fiorentina announced the signing of Ljajić. After passing a medical, Ljajić signed a five-year contract, with Partizan receiving a reported fee of €8 million for the player. Ljajić made his debut in Fiorentina's 2–2 draw away to Cagliari on 31 January 2010, coming on as an 82nd-minute substitute for Manuel Pasqual. However, his first half-season at the club under head coach Cesare Prandelli was spent settling into the new surroundings.

The arrival of Ljajić's compatriot Siniša Mihajlović as head coach saw increased first-team opportunities for Ljajić. He scored his first Viola goal from the penalty spot against Lazio on 18 September 2010, which Fiorentina lost 1–2.

On 2 May 2012, Ljajić was substituted in a match against Novara. His reaction to this substitution was to sarcastically applaud the manager Delio Rossi, who grabbed and attempted to punch Ljajić. Fiorentina announced after the match that Rossi had been dismissed as manager and that they would take proportionate measures against Ljajić. Ljajić's teammate Valon Behrami, who was on the substitutes' bench at the time of the incident, said no one, including him, had heard Ljajić insult Rossi, which disproved Rossi's claims Ljajić insulted his family. Behrami added Rossi should be ashamed for his actions as well as for lying to the media.

Ljajić scored a brace as La Viola beat Internazionale 4–1 on 17 February 2013.

=== Roma ===
Ljajić signed with Roma on 28 August 2013 for a fee of €11 million, potentially rising to €15 million depending on the club's success, with Ljajić signing a four-year contract. He chose the number 8 jersey, left vacant by Erik Lamela, which Ljajić also used with the Serbia national team. On 1 September 2013, Ljajić made his Roma debut in a match against Hellas Verona, replacing Alessandro Florenzi; Ljajić scored the final goal in 3–0 win. In his first season in Rome, Ljajić scored 6 goals in 32 appearances.

On 30 August 2014, Ljajić made his 2014–15 season debut in a 2–0 win for the Giallorossi over Fiorentina. On 24 September, he scored his first goal of the season in a 2–1 Roma victory over Parma. On 6 December, he scored his first brace for Roma, which allowed Roma to come back and draw the home match against Sassuolo, which finished 2–2. On 26 February 2015, he scored his first goal in the UEFA Europa League for the club, the opener in a 2–1 win away to Feyenoord. He concluded the season with 41 appearances and 9 goals, making him the club's second-highest goalscorer of the season, after Francesco Totti.

==== Loan to Inter Milan ====
On 31 August 2015, Ljajić signed for Inter Milan on a season-long loan, with Inter paying Roma €1.75 million and including an option to make the transfer permanent at the end of the season for €11 million. On 1 December 2015, Ljajić scored his first Inter goal in a 2–1 away loss to Napoli.

=== Torino ===
After Inter opted not to exercise their purchase option, Ljajić was sold to Torino on 18 July 2016 for €8.5 million, plus €500,000 in potential bonuses.

=== Beşiktaş ===
On 31 August 2018, Ljajić joined Turkish Süper Lig club Beşiktaş on a season-long loan. On 29 May 2019, Beşiktaş signed Ljajić on a permanent deal for a reported fee of €6.5 million.

=== Fatih Karagümrük ===
On 28 September 2022, Ljajić joined Fatih Karagümrük on a one-and-a-half-year contract. He only became available for the team's official matches starting January 2023.

=== Novi Pazar ===
On 14 September 2023, Ljajić returned to his hometown and signed for Novi Pazar. It is also stated that Ljajić had one condition, and it concerns his salary. Namely, he asked to play for the club for free. Three days later, he scored the winning goal on his debut in a 2–1 win over Napredak, coming on in the 58th minute as a substitute for Adetunji Adeshina.

=== Sarajevo ===
In August 2025, Ljajić left Novi Pazar and signed a two-year contract with Bosnian Premier League club Sarajevo.

=== Return to Novi Pazar ===
On 31 August 2026, Ljajić returned to Novi Pazar, signing a one-year contract.

== International career ==
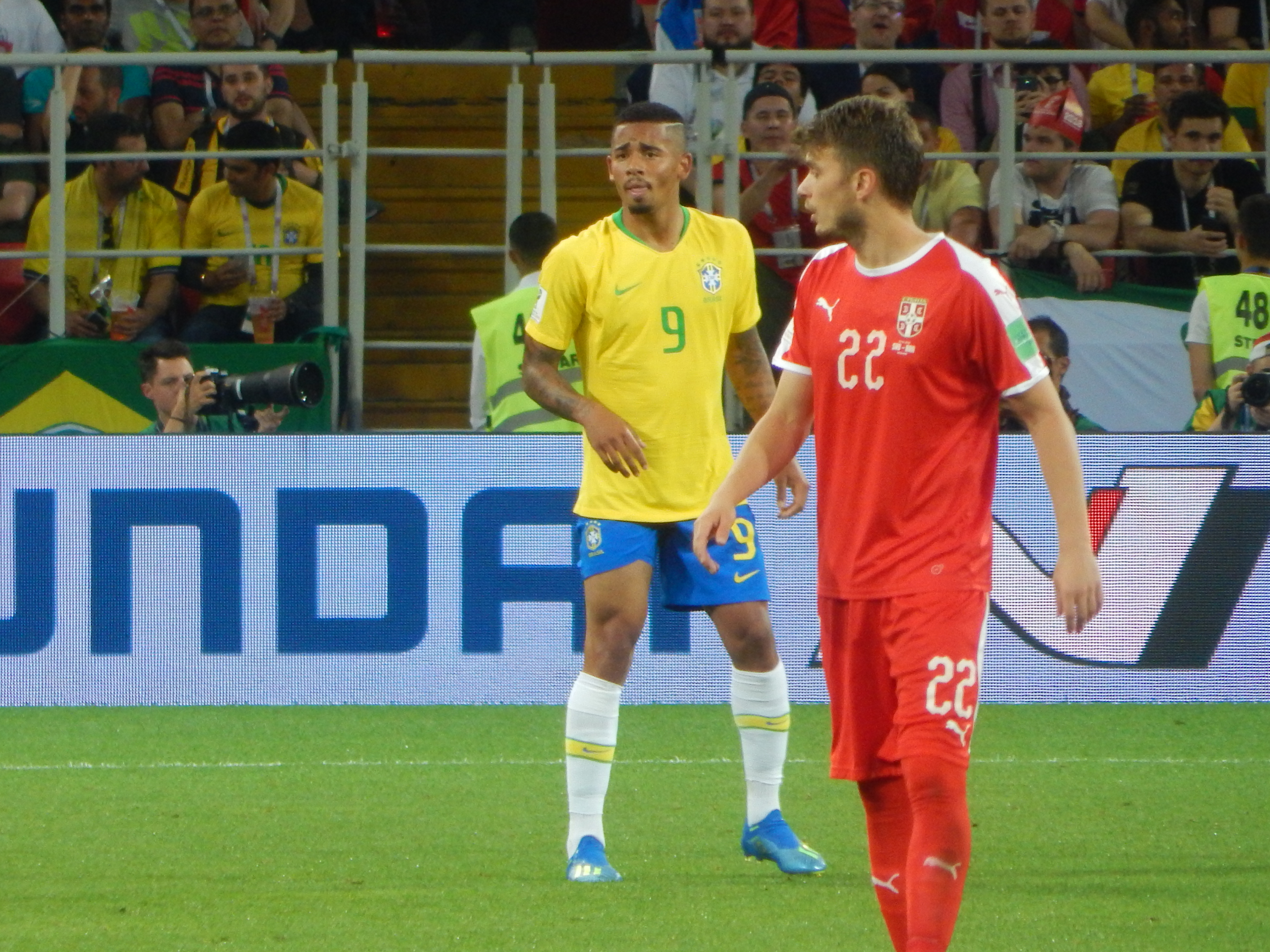
Ljajić (in red) and Brazil's Gabriel Jesus at the 2018 FIFA World Cup

Ljajić represented the Serbia under-17 and under-19 teams. On 7 September 2008, he made his international debut for the under-21 squad in a European Championship qualification match against Hungary. On 26 October 2010, it was announced by Serbia coach Vladimir Petrović that Ljajić would receive his first senior call-up against Bulgaria in a friendly match on 17 November 2010.

Ljajić was removed from his country's squad by head coach Siniša Mihajlović after refusing to sing the Serbian national anthem in a 2–0 friendly loss against Spain on 28 May 2012 for personal reasons. Ljajić previously signed a code of conduct established by Mihajlović that included, among other things, to sing the Serbian national anthem, "Bože pravde" (God of Justice). Ljajić confirmed Mihajlović's statement, also claiming he loves Serbia and that he has a will to play for its national team, but added he must respect himself, implying he was no longer going to play under Mihajlović.

On 17 February 2014, the new head coach of the Serbia national team, Ljubinko Drulović, said he would not require players to sing the national anthem but to give their all for their country on the field. Ljajić scored his first goal for the senior side on 7 June 2015 in a 4–1 friendly win against Azerbaijan.

In June 2018, Ljajić was included in the 23-man Serbian squad for the 2018 FIFA World Cup in Russia, where he played in all three group matches as Serbia was eliminated during the group stage.

== Basketball career ==
On 7 November 2024, Ljajić signed a contract with KK Novi Pazar 1969. The club announced that Ljajić would "be available to coach Hadžerić when he balances his obligations with the football team".

== Personal life ==
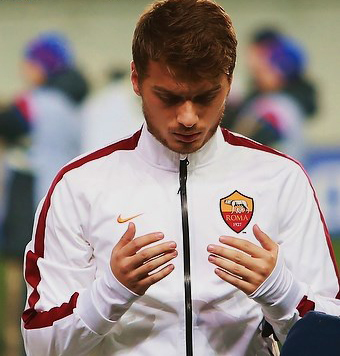
Ljajić praying before a match between Roma and CSKA Moscow in November 2014

Ljajić is an ethnic Bosniak and a practising Muslim.

== Career statistics ==
=== Club ===
As of match played 8 November 2026

Appearances and goals by club, season and competition
Club	Season	League			National cup (Note: Includes Serbian Cup, Coppa Italia, Turkish Cup, Bosnian Cup)		Continental		Other		Total	
Club	Season	Division	Apps	Goals	Apps	Goals	Apps	Goals	Apps	Goals	Apps	Goals
Partizan	2008–09	Serbian SuperLiga	24	5	5	1	4 (Note: Two appearances in UEFA Champions League; two appearances in UEFA Cup)	0	—		33	6
Partizan	2009–10	Serbian SuperLiga	14	4	2	0	8 (Note: One appearance in UEFA Champions League; seven appearances and two goals in UEFA Europa League)	2	—		24	6
Partizan	Total		38	9	7	1	12	2	—		57	12
Fiorentina	2009–10	Serie A	9	0	1	0	—		—		10	0
Fiorentina	2010–11	Serie A	26	3	2	0	—		—		28	3
Fiorentina	2011–12	Serie A	15	1	3	0	—		—		18	1
Fiorentina	2012–13	Serie A	28	11	3	1	—		—		31	12
Fiorentina	2013–14	Serie A	0	0	—		1 (Note: Appearance(s) in UEFA Europa League)	0	—		1	0
Fiorentina	Total		78	15	9	1	1	0	—		88	16
Roma	2013–14	Serie A	28	6	4	0	—		—		32	6
Roma	2014–15	Serie A	32	8	2	0	7 (Note: Four appearances in UEFA Champions League; three appearances and one goal in UEFA Europa League)	1	—		41	9
Roma	2015–16	Serie A	1	0	—		—		—		1	0
Roma	Total		61	14	6	0	7	1	—		74	15
Inter Milan (loan)	2015–16	Serie A	25	3	3	1	—		—		28	4
Torino	2016–17	Serie A	33	10	3	2	—		—		36	12
Torino	2017–18	Serie A	27	6	1	0	—		—		28	6
Torino	2018–19	Serie A	1	0	—		—		—		1	0
Torino	Total		61	16	4	2	—		—		65	18
Beşiktaş	2018–19	Süper Lig	27	9	—		5	0	—		32	9
Beşiktaş	2019–20	Süper Lig	24	5	1	0	4	2	—		29	7
Beşiktaş	2020–21	Süper Lig	22	2	1	0	1	0	—		24	2
Beşiktaş	2021–22	Süper Lig	0	0	—		—		—		0	0
Beşiktaş	Total		73	16	2	0	10	2	—		85	18
Fatih Karagümrük	2022–23	Süper Lig	9	0	—		—		—		9	0
Fatih Karagümrük	2023–24	Süper Lig	2	0	—		—		—		2	0
Fatih Karagümrük	Total		11	0	—		—		—		11	0
Novi Pazar	2023–24	Serbian SuperLiga	24	9	2	0	—		—		26	9
Novi Pazar	2024–25	Serbian SuperLiga	35	8	1	0	—		—		36	8
Novi Pazar	2025–26	Serbian SuperLiga	2	0	0	0	2 (Note: Appearance(s) in UEFA Conference League)	0	—		4	0
Novi Pazar	Total		61	17	3	0	2	0	—		66	17
Sarajevo	2025–26	Bosnian Premier League	25	6	2	1	—		1 (Note: Appearance in Bosnian Supercup)	0	28	7
Sarajevo	2026–27	Bosnian Premier League	0	0	0	0	2	0	—		2	0
Sarajevo	Total		25	6	2	1	2	0	1	0	30	7
Novi Pazar	2026–27	Serbian SuperLiga	8	1	0	0	—		—		8	1
Career total			441	97	36	6	34	5	1	0	512	108

=== International ===
As of 11 October 2020

Appearances and goals by national team and year
National team	Year	Apps	Goals
Serbia	2010	1	0
Serbia	2011	5	0
Serbia	2012	1	0
Serbia	2013	0	0
Serbia	2014	2	0
Serbia	2015	8	3
Serbia	2016	3	0
Serbia	2017	5	2
Serbia	2018	10	3
Serbia	2019	10	1
Serbia	2020	2	0
Total		47	9

Scores and results list Serbia's goal tally first, score column indicates score after each Ljajić goal.

List of international goals scored by Adem Ljajić
No.	Date	Venue	Opponent	Score	Result	Competition
1	7 June 2015	NV Arena, Sankt Pölten, Austria	Azerbaijan	2–1	4–1	Friendly
2	4 September 2015	Karađorđe Stadium, Novi Sad, Serbia	Armenia	2–0	2–0	UEFA Euro 2016 qualification
3	8 October 2015	Elbasan Arena, Elbasan, Albania	Albania	2–0	2–0	UEFA Euro 2016 qualification
4	10 November 2017	Tianhe Stadium, Guangzhou, China	China	1–0	2–0	Friendly
5	14 November 2017	Ulsan Munsu Football Stadium, Ulsan, South Korea	South Korea	1–0	1–1	Friendly
6	9 June 2018	Liebenauer Stadium, Graz, Austria	Bolivia	2–0	5–1	Friendly
7	17 November 2018	Red Star Stadium, Belgrade, Serbia	Montenegro	1–0	2–1	2018–19 UEFA Nations League C
8	20 November 2018	Partizan Stadium, Belgrade, Serbia	Lithuania	4–1	4–1	2018–19 UEFA Nations League C
9	10 June 2019	Red Star Stadium, Belgrade, Serbia	Lithuania	4–1	4–1	UEFA Euro 2020 qualification

== Honours ==
Partizan

- Serbian SuperLiga: 2008–09
- Serbian Cup: 2008–09

Beşiktaş

- Süper Lig: 2020–21
- Turkish Cup: 2020–21

Individual

- Serbian SuperLiga Team of the Season: 2023–24
- Serbian SuperLiga Player of the Week: 2024–25 (Round 1, Round 34)
- Serbian SuperLiga Player of the Season: 2024–25
