= Nikola Vujović =

Montenegrin footballer (born 1981)

Personal information
- Full name: Nikola Vujović
- Date of birth: 23 June 1981 (age 45)
- Place of birth: Cetinje, SFR Yugoslavia
- Height: 1.83 m (6 ft 0 in)
- Position: Attacking midfielder

Youth career
- Lovćen

Senior career*
Years	Team	Apps	(Gls)
2001–2005	Budućnost Podgorica	100	(42)
2005–2006	Akratitos	14	(0)
2006–2007	Budućnost Podgorica	29	(3)
2007–2008	Mogren	41	(14)
2009–2010	Partizan	14	(3)
2011–2013	Mogren	85	(32)
2014	Čelik Nikšić	9	(1)
2014–2015	Lovćen	35	(3)
2016	Cetinje	11	(8)
2016–2017	Kom	25	(7)
2017	Mornar	4	(0)

International career
2007–2009	Montenegro	6	(0)
- * Club domestic league appearances and goals as of 29 August 2018

Nikola Vujović (Cyrillic: Никола Вујовић; born 23 June 1981) is a Montenegrin retired footballer who plays as an attacking midfielder.

== Club career ==
Vujović spent the majority of his club career at Budućnost Podgorica and Mogren, having two spells with each side. He also played for Greek club Akratitos. In the 2009 winter transfer window, Vujović was transferred to Serbian champions Partizan. He helped the side defend the double in the 2008–09 season. However, after the initial six months at the club, Vujović was receiving very little playing time before being demoted from the first team. He ultimately returned to Mogren two years after leaving the club.

== International career ==
At international level, Vujović earned six caps for Montenegro between 2007 and 2009, making his debut against Japan at the Kirin Cup. His final international was an April 2009 FIFA World Cup qualification match against Georgia.

== Statistics ==
=== Club ===
Club	Season	League	
Club	Season	Apps	Goals
Budućnost Podgorica	2006–07	29	3
Mogren	2007–08	27	9
Mogren	2008–09	14	5
Mogren	Total	41	14
Partizan	2008–09	11	3
Partizan	2009–10	3	0
Partizan	Total	14	3
Mogren	2010–11	8	1
Mogren	2011–12	31	14
Mogren	2012–13	29	11
Mogren	2013–14	17	6
Mogren	Total	85	32
Čelik Nikšić	2013–14	9	1
Lovćen	2014–15	22	2
Lovćen	2015–16	13	1
Lovćen	Total	35	3
Cetinje	2015–16	11	8
Kom	2016–17	24	7
Mornar	2017–18	4	0
Career total		252	71

=== International ===
National team	Year	Apps	Goals
Montenegro	2007	2	0
Montenegro	2008	2	0
Montenegro	2009	2	0
Total		6	0

== Honours ==
Budućnost Podgorica

- Second League of Serbia and Montenegro: 2003–04

Partizan

- Serbian SuperLiga: 2008–09
- Serbian Cup: 2008–09

Kom

- Montenegrin Second League: 2016–17
