= Bogdan Stević =

Serbian footballer

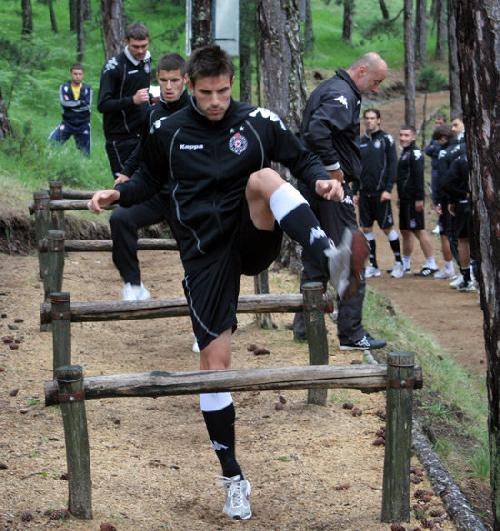
- Stević with Partizan in 2009

Personal information
- Full name: Bogdan Stević
- Date of birth: 4 June 1987 (age 39)
- Place of birth: Belgrade, SFR Yugoslavia
- Height: 1.82 m (6 ft 0 in)
- Position: Right back

Youth career
- Čukarički

Senior career*
Years	Team	Apps	(Gls)
2005	Žarkovo		
2005–2007	Sopot		
2007–2008	Radnički Obrenovac		
2009–2011	Partizan	1	(0)
2010–2011	→ Teleoptik (loan)	13	(0)
2011–2012	Radnički Obrenovac		
2012–2013	Uster		
2014–2016	Phönix Seen		
2016–2017	Uster		
2017–2019	Srbija Zürich		
- * Club domestic league appearances and goals as of 25 December 2017

Bogdan Stević (Serbian Cyrillic: Богдан Стевић; born 4 June 1987) is a Serbian footballer who most recently played for FC Srbija Zürich in the Swiss 2. Liga.

On 20 January 2009 it was officially announced that he signed for Partizan with a 5-year deal. He made 6 appearances for Partizan, of which one was in the second half of the 2008–09 Serbian SuperLiga. He played with Partizan satellite club FK Teleoptik in the 2010–11 Serbian First League.

== Honours ==
Partizan

- Serbian SuperLiga: 2008–09
- Serbian Cup: 2008–09
