= Ljubomir Fejsa =

Serbian footballer (born 1988)

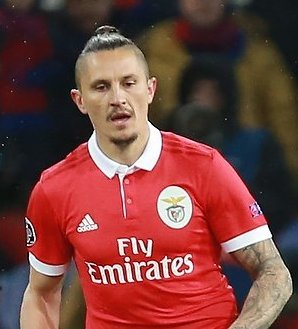
- Fejsa playing for Benfica in 2017

Personal information
- Full name: Ljubomir Fejsa
- Date of birth: 14 August 1988 (age 38)
- Place of birth: Titov Vrbas, SR Serbia, Yugoslavia
- Height: 1.85 m (6 ft 1 in)
- Position: Defensive midfielder

Youth career
- 2006: Hajduk Kula

Senior career*
Years	Team	Apps	(Gls)
2006–2008	Hajduk Kula	58	(2)
2008–2011	Partizan	49	(2)
2011–2013	Olympiacos	20	(0)
2013–2020	Benfica	114	(1)
2015	Benfica B	2	(0)
2020	→ Alavés (loan)	13	(0)
2020–2021	Al-Ahli	23	(1)
2022–2023	Partizan	25	(0)
Total		304	(6)

International career^{‡}
2008–2011	Serbia U21	23	(2)
2007–2019	Serbia	25	(0)
- * Club domestic league appearances and goals as of 21 May 2023 ‡ National team caps and goals as of 8 June 2019

Ljubomir Fejsa (Serbian Cyrillic: Љубомир Фејса, pronounced [ʎǔbomir fě:jsa]; born 14 August 1988) is a Serbian former professional footballer. He competed for Serbia at the 2008 Summer Olympics.

From 2008–09 to 2016–17 seasons, Fejsa won ten consecutive league titles across three clubs: three with Partizan, three with Olympiacos and four with Benfica, winning both the Super League Greece and the Primeira Liga in the 2013–14 season.

== Club career ==
=== Partizan ===
On 1 July 2008, Fejsa signed for FK Partizan after the club had been interested in him for over one year. He signed a five-year contract and was given the number 5 shirt. For the three seasons he spent in Partizan, Fejsa won three Serbian Championship Titles as well as two trophies in the Serbian Cup, including the 2008–09 and 2009–10 seasons. He was included in the ideal club of the domestic championship. In an April 2010 friendly match between Serbia and Japan, which ended in a 3–0 victory for the former, Fejsa suffered anterior cruciate ligament injury, after which he spent more than one year out of the field. Fejsa only returned to play at the end of the 2010–11 season.

=== Olympiacos ===
On 21 June 2011, Fejsa signed with Olympiacos with a transfer fee of €3 million and signed a four-year contract. He debuted in a friendly 1–0 victory against Galatasaray. Fejsa scored his first goal against Inter Milan during another friendly match. He showed good form at the beginning of 2011–12 season, and had impressive performances during the early stages of Champions League group stages. However, Fejsa was injured during training, leading him to miss the rest of the season.

During the 2012–13 season, when Leonardo Jardim was named head coach of Olympiacos, Fejsa was regularly benched and barely made any appearance during the Portuguese coach stay at the club. In February 2013, when Jardim was sacked by Olympiacos due to the crowds dismay from playing style of the team, coach Míchel was hired and he immediately made Fejsa one of the starters. He made decent appearances despite being benched for most of the season and was called back to Serbia national football team for the 2014 FIFA World Cup qualification.

=== Benfica ===
On 23 August 2013, Fejsa signed a five-year contract with Benfica for a reported fee of €4.5 million.

Fejsa made his debut on 19 September in a Champions League match against Anderlecht. He appeared sporadically in the first half of the season, but with Nemanja Matić's transfer to Chelsea, he became the sole option to the position, appearing far more regularly. However, an injury in early April 2014 sidelined him for the next months.

On 2 February 2015, Benfica registered Fejsa at the LPFP, enabling him to play the rest of the season. He returned to competition, debuting for the reserve team in Segunda Liga on 11 March. A month later, he returned to Benfica's first-team, as a substitute, and scored the fifth goal of the match against Académica (5–1) in Primeira Liga.

On 29 January 2020, Fejsa moved to Spanish La Liga club Alavés on loan until the end of the season.

=== Later career and retirement ===
Fejsa left Benfica on 24 September 2020, signing with Saudi Arabian club Al-Ahli for two seasons. He returned to Partizan in January 2022, only to leave the club after his contract expired at the end of the 2022–23 season. Fejsa officially announced his retirement on 9 October 2024.

== International career ==
On 24 November 2007, Fejsa made his senior debut for the Serbia national team under head coach Javier Clemente as a substitute during the rescheduled UEFA Euro 2008 qualification at home against Kazakhstan. He also made substitute appearances against Northern Ireland, Faroe Islands, and Italy in the UEFA Euro 2012 qualifying. He earned a total of 25 appearances, scoring no goals. His final international match was a June 2019 European Championship qualification match away against Ukraine.

== Personal life ==
Fejsa is married and has two children.

== Career statistics ==
=== Club ===
As of end of 2021–22 season

Club	Season	League			National Cup		Continental		Other (Note: Includes Taça da Liga and Supertaça Cândido de Oliveira)		Total	
Club	Season	Division	Apps	Goals	Apps	Goals	Apps	Goals	Apps	Goals	Apps	Goals
Hajduk Kula	2005–06	Serbian SuperLiga	4	0	0	0	–		–		4	0
Hajduk Kula	2006–07	Serbian SuperLiga	22	1	0	0	0	0	–		22	1
Hajduk Kula	2007–08	Serbian SuperLiga	32	1	0	0	2	0	–		34	1
Hajduk Kula	Total		58	2	0	0	2	0	–		60	2
Partizan	2008–09	Serbian SuperLiga	27	0	3	0	5	0	–		35	0
Partizan	2009–10	Serbian SuperLiga	20	2	3	0	9	0	–		32	2
Partizan	2010–11	Serbian SuperLiga	2	0	0	0	0	0	–		2	0
Partizan	Total		49	2	6	0	14	0	–		69	2
Olympiacos	2011–12	Super League Greece	4	0	1	0	3	0	–		8	0
Olympiacos	2012–13	Super League Greece	15	0	8	1	4	0	–		27	1
Olympiacos	2013–14	Supe league Greece	1	0	0	0	0	0	–		1	0
Olympiacos	Total		20	0	9	1	7	0	–		36	1
Benfica	2013–14	Primeira Liga	16	0	2	0	7	0	2	0	27	0
Benfica	2014–15	Primeira Liga	5	1	0	0	0	0	1	0	6	1
Benfica	2015–16	Primeira Liga	19	0	1	0	6	0	2	0	28	0
Benfica	2016–17	Primeira Liga	25	0	1	0	7	1	2	0	35	1
Benfica	2017–18	Primeira Liga	28	0	2	0	4	0	1	0	35	0
Benfica	2018–19	Primeira Liga	18	0	2	0	12	0	1	0	33	0
Benfica	2019–20	Primeira Liga	3	0	0	0	2	0	0	0	5	0
Benfica	Total		114	1	8	0	38	1	9	0	169	2
Benfica B	2014–15	Segunda Liga	2	0	—		—		—		2	0
Alavés (loan)	2019–20	La Liga	13	0	0	0	—		—		13	0
Al Ahli	2020–21	Saudi Pro League	22	1	1	0	—		0	0	23	1
Al Ahli	2021–22	Saudi Pro League	1	0	0	0	—		0	0	1	0
Al Ahli	Total		23	1	1	0	–		0	0	24	1
Partizan	2021–22	Serbian SuperLiga	2	0	0	0	0	0	–		2	0
Partizan	2022–23	Serbian SuperLiga	23	0	0	0	9	0	–		32	0
Career total			304	6	24	1	70	1	9	0	407	8

=== International ===
As of match played 7 June 2019

Serbia
Year	Apps	Goals
2007	1	0
2008	0	0
2009	0	0
2010	1	0
2011	3	0
2012	5	0
2013	6	0
2014	1	0
2015	5	0
2016	1	0
2017	0	0
2018	1	0
2019	1	0
Total	25	0

== Honours ==
Partizan

- Serbian SuperLiga: 2008–09, 2009–10, 2010–11
- Serbian Cup: 2008–09, 2010–11

Olympiacos

- Super League Greece: 2011–12, 2012–13, 2013–14
- Greek Cup: 2011–12, 2012–13

Benfica

- Primeira Liga: 2013–14, 2014–15, 2015–16, 2016–17, 2018–19
- Taça de Portugal: 2013–14, 2016–17
- Taça da Liga: 2013–14, 2014–15, 2015–16
- Supertaça Cândido de Oliveira: 2016, 2017
- UEFA Europa League runner-up: 2013–14

=== Individual ===
- Serbian SuperLiga Team of the Season: 2008–09, 2009–10
