= Miloš Bogunović =

Serbian footballer

Personal information
- Full name: Miloš Bogunović
- Date of birth: 10 June 1985 (age 41)
- Place of birth: Belgrade, SFR Yugoslavia
- Height: 1.77 m (5 ft 10 in)
- Positions: Striker; winger

Youth career
- Zemun
- Teleoptik

Senior career*
Years	Team	Apps	(Gls)
2003–2005	Srem Jakovo	39	(9)
2006–2008	Rad	79	(22)
2008–2011	Partizan	46	(7)
2010	→ Cádiz (loan)	3	(0)
2011–2013	Novi Pazar	48	(6)
2013–2014	Bangkok United	36	(5)
2015	Donji Srem	14	(1)
2015	Spartak Subotica	10	(0)
2016–2017	Teleoptik	19	(4)
2018	Žarkovo	25	(1)
Total		319	(55)

International career
2008	Serbia	1	(0)
- * Club domestic league appearances and goals as of 11 May 2019

Miloš Bogunović (Serbian Cyrillic: Милош Богуновић; born 10 June 1985) is a Serbian retired footballer who plays as a forward.

== Club career ==
=== Early career ===
After spending his development years at local clubs Zemun and Teleoptik, Bogunović made his senior debuts with Srem Jakovo in the Serbian League Belgrade in 2003. He was subsequently transferred to top-flight side Rad in the 2006 winter transfer window. However, the club suffered relegation to the second tier at the end of the season. In the following season, Bogunović was the team's third-highest scorer with eight league goals, behind Filip Đorđević (16) and Brana Ilić (9), as Rad failed to earn promotion back after losing in the playoffs to BSK Borča. The club eventually won promotion in 2008, after defeating Smederevo in the final elimination round. With 13 league goals, Bogunović finished the season as the club's top scorer ahead of the likes of Brana Ilić (6) and Vladimir Jovančić (4).

=== Partizan ===
On 18 June 2008, Bogunović moved to Partizan, signing a four-year deal. He made his competitive debut for the club in the first leg of the 2008–09 UEFA Champions League second qualifying round, on 29 July 2008, scoring the opener in a 1–1 draw away at Inter Baku. On 13 August 2008, Bogunović scored a 14th-minute goal in the third qualifying round first leg versus Fenerbahçe, to give his team a 2–0 lead. He then scored an amazing long-distance goal, which was eventually disallowed due to offside. The game eventually ended in a 2–2 draw. On 18 September 2008, Bogunović scored the winning goal in a 2–1 away victory over Timișoara in the first leg of the 2008–09 UEFA Cup first round. He also helped the club defend the domestic double that season.

In January 2010, Bogunović moved to Spain and joined Segunda División side Cádiz, on a six-month loan deal. He made his official debut for the club in a league game against Albacete on 7 March 2010, which Cádiz won 4–3. Until the end of the season, Bogunović made just two more appearances, as the club was relegated to Segunda División B.

After returning from loan, Bogunović helped Partizan qualify for the 2010–11 UEFA Champions League group stage, but failed to make his debut in the main competition. He also collected his second double at the end of the season.

=== Later career ===
In July 2011, Bogunović signed a two-year contract with SuperLiga newcomers Novi Pazar. He spent two seasons at the club, making 48 league appearances and scoring six goals. In the summer of 2013, Bogunović moved abroad for the second time and joined Thai club Bangkok United.

In early 2015, Bogunović returned to his country and joined SuperLiga club Donji Srem. He switched to fellow top-tier side Spartak Subotica in August of the same year.

== International career ==
Bogunović made his international debut for Serbia in a 0–1 friendly loss against Poland on 14 December 2008.

== Statistics ==
Club	Season	League		Cup		Continental		Total	
Club	Season	Apps	Goals	Apps	Goals	Apps	Goals	Apps	Goals
Rad	2005–06	13	1	0	0	—		13	1
Rad	2006–07	35	8			—		35	8
Rad	2007–08	31	13	1	0	—		32	13
Rad	Total	79	22	1	0	—		80	22
Partizan	2008–09	32	6	3	2	10	3	45	11
Partizan	2009–10	8	0	0	0	8	0	16	0
Partizan	2010–11	6	1	3	0	3	0	12	1
Partizan	Total	46	7	6	2	21	3	73	12
Cádiz (loan)	2009–10	3	0	0	0	—		3	0
Novi Pazar	2011–12	28	3	1	0	—		29	3
Novi Pazar	2012–13	20	3	2	0	—		22	3
Novi Pazar	Total	48	6	3	0	—		51	6
Bangkok United	2013	10	3	0	0	—		10	3
Bangkok United	2014	26	2	0	0	—		26	2
Bangkok United	Total	36	5	0	0	—		36	5
Donji Srem	2014–15	14	1	0	0	—		14	1
Spartak Subotica	2015–16	10	0	2	1	—		12	1
Teleoptik	2016–17	16	4	0	0	—		16	4
Teleoptik	2017–18	3	0	0	0	—		3	0
Žarkovo	2017–18	10	1	0	0	—		10	1
Žarkovo	2018–19	15	0	0	0	—		15	0
Career total		280	46	12	3	21	3	313	52

== Honours ==
Partizan

- Serbian SuperLiga: 2008–09, 2010–11
- Serbian Cup: 2008–09, 2010–11

Teleoptik

- Serbian League Belgrade: 2016–17

Žarkovo

- Serbian League Belgrade: 2017–18
