= Serbian SuperLiga Team of the Season =

The Serbian SuperLiga Team of the Season is an annual award given to a set of 11 footballers in the top tier of Serbian football, the SuperLiga, who are seen to be the best 11 players of the calendar season.

== Serbian Super League Club Union Team of the Season ==
=== 2008–09 ===
The award ceremony, organized by the Serbian Super League Club Union and Jelen Pivo, was held on 28 May 2009 in Belgrade.

Pos.	Player	Club	Appearance
GK	(Montenegro) Mladen Božović	PAR	1
RB	(Serbia) Ivan Stevanović	PAR	1
CB	(Serbia) Nenad Đorđević	PAR	1
CB	(Serbia) Boban Dmitrović	BOR	1
LB	(Serbia) Ivan Obradović	PAR	1
DM	(Serbia) Ljubomir Fejsa	PAR	1
RM	(Serbia) Nemanja Tomić	PAR	1
CM	(Serbia) Nenad Milijaš	CZV	1
LM	(Serbia) Ognjen Koroman	CZV	1
AM	(Portugal) Almami Moreira	PAR	1
FW	(Senegal) Lamine Diarra	PAR	1

=== 2009–10 ===
The award ceremony, organized by the Serbian Super League Club Union and Jelen Pivo, was held on 20 May 2010 in Belgrade.

Pos.	Player	Club	Appearance
GK	(Serbia) Saša Stamenković	CZV	1
RB	(Serbia) Pavle Ninkov	CZV	1
CB	(Serbia) Milan Vilotić	CZV	1
CB	(Serbia) Mladen Krstajić	PAR	1
LB	(Serbia) Marko Lomić	PAR	1
DM	(Serbia) Ljubomir Fejsa	PAR	2
RM	(Serbia) Nikola Lazetić	CZV	1
CM	(Serbia) Radosav Petrović	PAR	1
LM	(Serbia) Dušan Tadić	VOJ	1
AM	(Portugal) Almami Moreira	PAR	2
FW	(Serbia) Dragan Mrđa	VOJ	1

=== 2010–11 ===
The award ceremony, organized by the Serbian Super League Club Union and Jelen Pivo, was held on 27 May 2011 in Belgrade.

Pos.	Player	Club	Appearance
GK	(Serbia) Bojan Šaranov	OFK	1
RB	(Serbia) Pavle Ninkov	CZV	2
CB	(Montenegro) Stefan Savić	PAR	1
CB	(North Macedonia) Daniel Mojsov	VOJ	1
LB	(Serbia) Duško Tošić	CZV	1
RM	(Serbia) Stefan Babović	PAR	1
CM	(Serbia) Slobodan Medojević	VOJ	1
CM	(Serbia) Radosav Petrović	PAR	2
LM	(Brazil) Evandro	CZV	1
FW	(Cameroon) Aboubakar Oumarou	VOJ	1
FW	(Serbia) Andrija Kaluđerović (Serbia) Ivica Iliev	CZV; PAR	1; 1

=== 2011–12 ===
The award ceremony, organized by the Serbian Super League Club Union and Jelen Pivo, was held on 14 May 2012 in Belgrade.

Pos.	Player	Club	Appearance
GK	(Croatia) Marko Šimić	JAG	1
RB	(Serbia) Branko Pauljević	HAJ	1
CB	(Serbia) Nikola Maksimović	CZV	1
CB	(Serbia) Duško Tošić	CZV	2
LB	(Serbia) Filip Mladenović	CZV	1
RM	(Serbia) Darko Lazović	CZV	1
CM	(Serbia) Luka Milivojević (Sierra Leone) Medo Kamara	CZV; PAR	1; 1
CM	(Serbia) Zvonimir Vukić	PAR	1
LM	(Serbia) Stefan Babović	PAR	2
FW	(Serbia) Darko Spalević	RKG	1
FW	(Serbia) Lazar Marković	PAR	1

=== 2012–13 ===
The award ceremony, organized by the Serbian Super League Club Union and Jelen Pivo, was held on 1 June 2013 in Belgrade.

Pos.	Player	Club	Appearance
GK	(Serbia) Vladimir Stojković	PAR	1
RB	(Serbia) Miroslav Vulićević	PAR	1
CB	(Serbia) Branislav Trajković	VOJ	1
CB	(Bulgaria) Ivan Ivanov	PAR	1
LB	(Serbia) Miloš Josimov	DSM	1
RM	(Cameroon) Aboubakar Oumarou	VOJ	2
CM	(Serbia) Luka Milivojević	CZV	2
CM	(Serbia) Saša Ilić	PAR	1
LM	(Serbia) Lazar Marković	PAR	2
FW	(Serbia) Aleksandar Mitrović	PAR	1
FW	(Serbia) Lazar Veselinović	HAJ	1

=== 2013–14 ===
The team was announced on 30 May 2014 in a joint statement by the Serbian Super League Club Union and Jelen Pivo. No ceremony was held.

Pos.	Player	Club	Appearance
GK	(Serbia) Milan Lukač	PAR	1
RB	(Serbia) Miroslav Vulićević	PAR	2
CB	(Serbia) Bogdan Planić	OFK	1
CB	(Serbia) Srđan Babić	VOJ	1
LB	(Serbia) Nikola Mijailović	CZV	1
RM	(Serbia) Darko Lazović	CZV	2
CM	(Montenegro) Nikola Drinčić	PAR	1
CM	(Serbia) Nemanja Radoja	VOJ	1
LM	(Serbia) Mijat Gaćinović	VOJ	1
FW	(Serbia) Dragan Mrđa	CZV	2
FW	(Serbia) Aleksandar Pešić	JAG	1

=== 2014–15 ===
No team was selected by the Serbian Super League Club Union.

=== 2015–16 ===
No team was selected by the Serbian Super League Club Union.

=== 2016–17 ===
No team was selected by the Serbian Super League Club Union.

=== 2017–18 ===
The award ceremony, organized by the Serbian Super League Club Union and TV Arena Sport, was held on 14 May 2018 in Belgrade.

Pos.	Player	Club	Appearance
GK	(Serbia) Vladimir Stojković	PAR	2
RB	(Montenegro) Filip Stojković	CZV	1
CB	(Serbia) Nemanja Miletić	PAR	1
CB	(Serbia) Vujadin Savić	CZV	1
LB	(Serbia) Miroslav Bogosavac	ČUK	1
RM	(Serbia) Danilo Pantić	PAR	1
CM	(Serbia) Nenad Krstičić	CZV	1
CM	(Montenegro) Nikola Drinčić	ČUK	2
LM	(Serbia) Nemanja Radonjić	CZV	1
FW	(Serbia) Aleksandar Pešić	CZV	2
FW	(Serbia) Nemanja Nikolić	SPA	1

=== 2018–19 ===
The award ceremony, organized by the Serbian Super League Club Union and TV Arena Sport, was held on 16 May 2019 in Belgrade.

Pos.	Player	Club	Appearance
GK	(Canada) Milan Borjan	CZV	1
RB	(Montenegro) Filip Stojković	CZV	2
CB	(Serbia) Nemanja Miletić	PAR	2
CB	(Serbia) Radovan Pankov	RNI	1
LB	(Serbia) Miroslav Bogosavac	ČUK	2
RM	(Germany) Marko Marin	CZV	1
CM	(Serbia) Dušan Jovančić	CZV	1
CM	(Montenegro) Nikola Drinčić	RNI	3
LM	(Comoros) El Fardou Ben	CZV	1
FW	(Bosnia and Herzegovina) Nermin Haskić	RNI	1
FW	(Serbia) Ognjen Mudrinski	ČUK	1

== Serbian Professional Footballers' Association Team of the Season ==
=== 2014–15 ===
The award ceremony, organized by the Serbian Professional Footballers' Association, was held on 25 May 2015 in Belgrade.

Pos.	Player	Club	Appearance
GK	(Serbia) Predrag Rajković	CZV	1
RB	(Serbia) Filip Stojković	ČUK	1
CB	(Montenegro) Savo Pavićević	CZV	1
CB	(Serbia) Zoran Rendulić	ČUK	1
LB	(Serbia) Rajko Brežančić	ČUK	1
RM	(Serbia) Stefan Babović	PAR	1
CM	(Montenegro) Nikola Drinčić	PAR	1
CM	(Serbia) Igor Matić	ČUK	1
LM	(Serbia) Mijat Gaćinović	VOJ	1
FW	(Nigeria) Patrick Friday Eze	MLU	1
FW	(Serbia) Nikola Stojiljković	ČUK	1

=== 2015–16 ===
The award ceremony, organized by the Serbian Professional Footballers' Association, was held on 15 May 2016 in Belgrade.

Pos.	Player	Club	Appearance
GK	(Serbia) Damir Kahriman	CZV	1
RB	(Serbia) Filip Stojković	ČUK	2
CB	(Serbia) Bojan Ostojić	ČUK	1
CB	(Serbia) Aleksandar Luković	CZV	1
LB	(Argentina) Luis Ibáñez	CZV	1
RM	(Serbia) Aleksandar Katai	CZV	1
CM	(Netherlands) Mitchell Donald	CZV	1
CM	(Serbia) Marko Grujić	CZV	1
LM	(Serbia) Nemanja Mihajlović	PAR	1
FW	(Portugal) Hugo Vieira	CZV	1
FW	(Serbia) Andrija Pavlović	ČUK	1

=== 2016–17 ===
The team was announced on 29 May 2017 by the Serbian Professional Footballers' Association. No ceremony was held.

Pos.	Player	Club	Appearance
GK	(Serbia) Zoran Popović	VOŽ	1
RB	(Serbia) Miroslav Vulićević	PAR	1
CB	(Serbia) Bogdan Planić	VOJ	1
CB	(Serbia) Bojan Ostojić	PAR	2
LB	(Serbia) Dušan Anđelković	CZV	1
CM	(Brazil) Everton Luiz	PAR	1
CM	(Netherlands) Mitchell Donald	CZV	2
CM	(Serbia) Aleksandar Paločević	VOJ	1
FW	(Serbia) Filip Malbašić	VOJ	1
FW	(Serbia) Uroš Đurđević	PAR	1
FW	(Brazil) Leonardo	PAR	1

=== 2017–18 ===
The team was announced on 19 May 2018 by the Serbian Professional Footballers' Association. No ceremony was held.

Pos.	Player	Club	Appearance
GK	(Canada) Milan Borjan	CZV	1
RB	(Montenegro) Filip Stojković	CZV	3
CB	(Serbia) Nemanja Miletić	PAR	1
CB	(Serbia) Vujadin Savić	CZV	1
LB	(Serbia) Miroslav Bogosavac	ČUK	1
RM	(Serbia) Danilo Pantić	PAR	1
CM	(Serbia) Dušan Jovančić	VOJ	1
CM	(Serbia) Nenad Krstičić	CZV	1
LM	(Serbia) Nemanja Radonjić	CZV	1
FW	(Serbia) Aleksandar Pešić	CZV	1
FW	(Serbia) Nemanja Nikolić	SPA	1

=== 2018–19 ===
The team was announced on 21 May 2019 by the Serbian Professional Footballers' Association. No ceremony was held.

Pos.	Player	Club	Appearance
GK	(Canada) Milan Borjan	CZV	2
RB	(Serbia) Nemanja Miletić	PAR	2
CB	(Serbia) Radovan Pankov	RNI	1
CB	(Serbia) Nemanja Milunović	CZV	1
LB	(Serbia) Miroslav Bogosavac	ČUK	2
RM	(Serbia) Danilo Pantić	PAR	2
CM	(Serbia) Dušan Jovančić	CZV	2
CM	(Montenegro) Nikola Drinčić	RNI	2
LM	(Germany) Marko Marin	CZV	1
FW	(Bosnia and Herzegovina) Nermin Haskić	RNI	1
FW	(Serbia) Ognjen Mudrinski	ČUK	1
