= 2008–09 Serbian Cup =

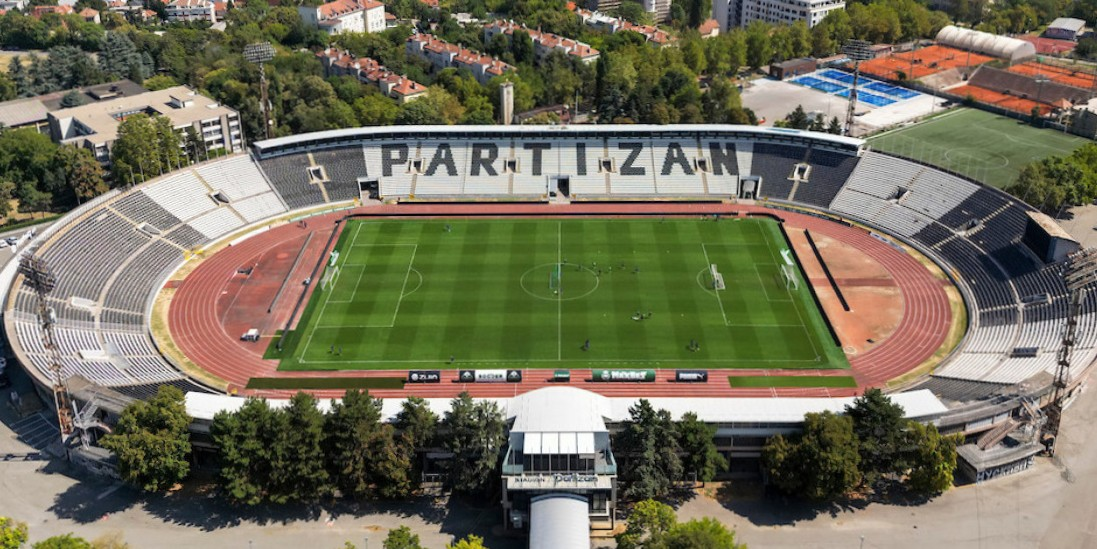
- Partizan Stadium hosted the final

Tournament details
- Country: Serbia

Final positions
- Champions: Partizan
- Runners-up: Sevojno

Tournament statistics
- Matches played: 34
- Goals scored: 71 (2.09 per match)

The 2008–09 Serbian Cup season was the third season of the Serbian national football tournament. The competition started on 3 September 2008 and ended with the final on 21 May 2009. The defending champions FK Partizan successfully defended their title.

== Awards ==
Award	Recipient	Affiliation
Most Valuable Player	Almami Moreira	Partizan
Golden Boot	Cléo	Red Star
Best Referee	Miodrag Gogić	Novi Sad

== Preliminary round ==
A preliminary round was held in order to reduce the number of teams competing in the next round to 32 and featured six teams from Serbian lower divisions. The matches were played on 3 September 2008.

Team 1	Score	Team 2
Srem Jakovo (III)	1–3	Big Bull (III)
Sinđelić (III)	1–0	Radnički Pirot (III)
Partizan Kosovska Mitrovica (IV)	0–0 (p. 5–4)	Sloga Kraljevo (III)

Note: Roman numerals in brackets denote the league tier the clubs participate in during the 2008–09 season.

== Round of 32 ==
In this round entered three winners from the previous round as well as all 12 teams from Serbian Superliga and several teams from Serbian second and third division. The matches were played on 24 September 2008.

Team 1	Score	Team 2
OFK Beograd	2–0	Novi Pazar (II)
Čukarički	1–1 (p. 5–6)	ČSK (II)
Napredak Kruševac	2–2 (p. 6–5)	Metalac (II)
Mladost Apatin (II)	0–2	Partizan
Sevojno (II)	0–0 (p. 8–7)	Hajduk Kula
Novi Sad (II)	0–0 (p. 5–6)	Javor Ivanjica
Srem (II)	1–2	Rad
Banat Zrenjanin	4–0	Zemun (III)
Jagodina	2–0	Vlasina (III)
Radnički Niš (III)	0–3	Red Star
Big Bull (III)	0–4^{1}	Vojvodina
Partizan Kosovska Mitrovica (IV)	1–3^{2}	Borac Čačak
Bežanija (II)	1–0	Voždovac (II)
Mladost Lučani (II)	0–1	Hajduk Beograd (II)
Mladenovac (III)	1–1 (p. 4–5)	Smederevo (II)
Sinđelić (III)	0–0 (p. 5–3)	BSK Borča (II)

^{1}The match was played in Šid.
^{2}The match was played in Zvečan.
Note: Roman numerals in brackets denote the league tier the clubs participate in during the 2008–09 season.

== Round of 16 ==
The matches were played on 12 November 2008.

Team 1	Score	Team 2
OFK Beograd	2–0	Sinđelić (III)
Partizan	4–2	Jagodina
ČSK (II)	0–2	Red Star
Borac Čačak	1–1 (p. 4–5)	Sevojno (II)
Hajduk Beograd (II)	1–1 (p. 7–6)	Vojvodina
Rad	0–0 (p. 3–4)	Napredak Kruševac
Smederevo (II)	1–0	Bežanija (II)
Javor Ivanjica	0–2	Banat Zrenjanin

Note: Roman numerals in brackets denote the league tier the clubs participate in during the 2008–09 season.

== Quarter-finals ==
15 April 2009
15:30 CEST

Hajduk Beograd (II)	0–4	Partizan
		Bogunović 19', 24'; Washington 27'; Ljalić 29'

Stadion Hajduk Lion, Belgrade

15 April 2009
15:30 CEST

Napredak Kruševac	1–1 (a.e.t.)	Sevojno (II)
Jovanović 90' (pen.)		Pavićević 60' (pen.)
Penalties
	4–5

Stadion Mladost, Kruševac

15 April 2009
15:30 CEST

Banat Zrenjanin	1–0	OFK Beograd
Zorić 39'

Karađorđev Park Stadium, Zrenjanin

15 April 2009
15:30 CEST

Red Star	4–1	Smederevo (II)
Cléo 30' 49'; Milijaš 63' 86'		Komadina 64'

Stadion Crvena Zvezda, Belgrade

Note: Roman numerals in brackets denote the league tier the clubs participate in during the 2008–09 season.

== Semi-finals ==
6 May 2009
16:30 CEST

Sevojno (II)	2–1	Red Star
Vujović 72'; Kamberović 90'		Somé 86'

Stadion kraj Valjaonice, Sevojno
Attendance: 5,000
Referee: Miodrag Gogić

6 May 2009
18:00 CEST

Partizan	1–0	Banat Zrenjanin
Stevanović 42'

Partizan Stadium, Belgrade
Attendance: 1,125
Referee: Boško Jovanetić

Note: Roman numerals in brackets denote the league tier the clubs participate in during the 2008–09 season.

== Final ==
21 May 2009
20:15 CEST

Partizan	3–0	Sevojno (II)
Đorđević 61'; Stevanović 84'; Petrović 89'

Partizan Stadium, Belgrade
Attendance: 13,434
Referee: Milorad Mažić

Note: Roman numerals in brackets denote the league tier the clubs participate in during the 2008–09 season.

Home Club	Score	Visiting Club
FK Partizan	3 – 0	FK Sevojno
Date	May 21, 2008	
Locale	Partizan Stadium, Belgrade, Serbia	
Attendance	13,434 (cap. 32,887)	
Referee	Milorad Mažić (Vrbas)	
FK Partizan (coach: Slaviša Jokanović)	Božović, Stevanović, Gavrančić, Đorđević (C), Obradović, Fejsa, Tomić, Moreira, Ljajić (Vujović 67'), Washington (Bogunović 46'), Diarra (Petrović 89')	
FK Sevojno (coach: Ljubiša Stamenković)	Nikolić, Kamberović, Bulatović, Janković, Branković (Vukojičić 69'), Raković (Stanković 75'), Virić (Radosavljević 63'), Jovičić, Pavićević, Goločevac, Vujović	
Notes	Scorer: 1–0 Đorđević 61', 2–0 Stevanović 84', 3–0 Petrović 89'	
