= Nemanja Tomić =

Serbian footballer

Personal information
- Full name: Nemanja Tomić
- Date of birth: 21 January 1988 (age 38)
- Place of birth: Kragujevac, SFR Yugoslavia
- Height: 1.80 m (5 ft 11 in)
- Position: Right winger

Youth career
- 1997–2006: Radnički Kragujevac

Senior career*
Years	Team	Apps	(Gls)
2004–2005	Radnički Kragujevac	3	(0)
2006–2009	Teleoptik	66	(10)
2009–2013	Partizan	107	(22)
2013–2016	Gençlerbirliği	50	(6)
2016–2017	Giresunspor	19	(2)
2017–2018	Trikala	24	(4)
2018–2019	Zemun	20	(4)
2019	Radnički Niš	5	(0)
2019–2020	Radnik Surdulica	15	(2)
2020–2022	Radnički Kragujevac	59	(10)
2023	Mladost Lučani	9	(1)
2023–2024	Radnički Kragujevac	10	(0)
Total		387	(61)

International career
2009–2010	Serbia U21	12	(1)
2010–2012	Serbia	5	(1)
- * Club domestic league appearances and goals as of 26 May 2024

Nemanja Tomić (Serbian Cyrillic: Немања Томић; born 21 January 1988) is a Serbian retired footballer. He has been described as a "tricky" winger with sublime dribbling skill.

== Club career ==
Tomić started his football career at hometown side Radnički Kragujevac. As a 16-year-old, he made his debut for Radnički and set a club record as the youngest senior player to debut for the club. In early 2006, Tomić received an invitation to move to Partizan, but first played two and a half seasons for Partizan's reserve team Teleoptik. During that spell his playing development was carefully monitored by the Partizan coaches and it was decided that he join the first team squad. On 20 January, in 2009, it was announced that he signed a 5-year deal for Partizan.

=== Partizan ===
==== 2009–10 ====
In his first season with Partizan, his new club ended up in first place in the Jelen SuperLiga. In the regular season, he featured in 29 league games and scored two goals. He played all 6 games in the 2009–10 UEFA Europa League group stage, during which he earned his first experience playing for a club in group stage of a UEFA competition.

==== 2010–11 ====
In the 2010–11 regular season, Tomić scored a total of four goals in 23 league games. It was also in this season during which Partizan played in the group stage of the UEFA Champions League for the first time since 2003. Tomić played three of six games that Partizan featured in Group H of the 2010–11 UEFA Champions League; in one of the games he played against Arsenal in Belgrade.

==== 2011–2012 ====
As of the beginning of the 2012–13 season, Tomić with Partizan has accumulated four SuperLiga titles. Throughout the first half of 2012, during which Partizan guaranteed the 2011–12 SuperLiga title under Avram Grant, Tomić reportedly attracted interest from Roma. He played five games in the 2012–13 UEFA Europa League Group H, during which he scored a goal against Inter.

=== Gençlerbirliği ===
For the first time in his life, Tomić moved abroad to Turkey and signed for Gençlerbirliği on 4 January 2013 on a three-year contract.

=== Trikala ===
On 30 August 2017 Greek Football League side Trikala announced the signing of Tomić. On 10 December 2017 he scored twice in a 3–1 home win against Apollon Larissa.

== International career ==
Tomić made his first appearance for the Serbia U21 on 11 February, in 2009, in a friendly match against Cyprus U21. He was selected to be a part of the Serbia squad for the 2009 European Under-21 Championship in Sweden, and given the number 22 shirt. In the final tournament, he came in as a substitute in the all three group matches. Tomić made his debut for the Serbian senior team in a friendly match against Japan on 7 April, in 2010. Serbia won the match 3–0, with Tomić scoring Serbia's third goal from a free kick. In November 2011, he was additionally called up to the team for two friendly matches against Mexico and Honduras. He earned a total of 5 caps (1 goal) and his final international was an August 2012 friendly match against the Republic of Ireland.

=== Controversy in Croatia ===
On 13 October 2009, Nemanja Tomić scored a goal against Croatia U21 and celebrated by gesturing his hands resembling the shooting of firearms in the direction of the Croatian supporters. As a result, UEFA gave him a temporary match ban.

== Career statistics ==
Club performance			League		Cup		Continental		Total	
Season	Club	League	Apps	Goals	Apps	Goals	Apps	Goals	Apps	Goals
2008–09	Partizan	Serbian SuperLiga	14	2	2	0	0	0	16	2
2009–10	Partizan	Serbian SuperLiga	29	2	4	0	12	0	45	2
2010–11	Partizan	Serbian SuperLiga	23	4	3	0	9	1	35	5
2011–12	Partizan	Serbian SuperLiga	28	11	4	1	6	3	38	15
2012–13	Partizan	Serbian SuperLiga	13	3	0	0	11	4	24	7
Total			107	22	13	1	38	8	158	31
2012–13	Gençlerbirliği	Süper Lig	8	0	0	0	0	0	8	0
2013–14	Gençlerbirliği	Süper Lig	15	1	3	0	0	0	18	1
2014–15	Gençlerbirliği	Süper Lig	15	4	5	1	0	0	20	5
2015–16	Gençlerbirliği	Süper Lig	12	1	0	0	0	0	12	1
Total			50	6	8	1	0	0	58	7
2016–17	Giresunspor	TFF First League	19	2	0	0	0	0	19	2
2017–18	Trikala	Football League	24	4	5	0	0	0	29	4
2018–19	Zemun	Serbian SuperLiga	20	4	0	0	0	0	20	4
2019–20	Radnički Niš	Serbian SuperLiga	5	0	0	0	0	0	5	0
2019–20	Radnik Surdulica	Serbian SuperLiga	15	2	0	0	0	0	15	2
2020–21	Radnički Kragujevac	Serbian First League	17	5	1	0	0	0	18	5
2021–22	Radnički Kragujevac	Serbian SuperLiga	26	2	2	0	0	0	28	2
2022–23	Radnički Kragujevac	Serbian SuperLiga	16	3	1	0	0	0	17	3
Total			59	10	4	0	0	0	63	10
Career total			299	50	30	2	38	8	367	60

=== International goals ===
#	Date	Venue	Opponent	Score	Result	Competition
1.	7 April 2010	Nagai Stadium, Osaka	Japan	3–0	3–0	Friendly

== Honours ==
=== Club ===
Partizan

- Serbian League (4): 2008–09, 2009–10, 2010–11, 2011–12
- Serbian Cup (2): 2008–09, 2010–11

=== Individual ===
- Serbian SuperLiga Team of the Season (1): 2008–09
