= Vojkan Miljković =

Serbian footballer

Personal information
- Full name: Vojkan Miljković
- Date of birth: 4 June 1991 (age 35)
- Place of birth: Požarevac, SFR Yugoslavia
- Height: 1.84 m (6 ft 1/2 in)
- Position: Midfielder

Youth career
- Partizan

Senior career*
Years	Team	Apps	(Gls)
2009	Partizan	1	(0)
2009–2013	Teleoptik	52	(3)
2011	→ BSK Borča (loan)	19	(0)
2013–2014	Bežanija	21	(3)
2015	Proleter Novi Sad	16	(0)
2016	Teleoptik		
2016	Jedinstvo Užice		
2017	Radnički Beograd		
2017	RSK Rabrovo		
2018	SC Mannswörth	14	(2)
2019–2020	RSK Rabrovo		
2020	Pomoravlje 1946		
2021	Đerdap Golubac		
2022	VGSK Veliko Gradište		
2023–	Sloga 33		

International career
2009	Serbia U19	3	(1)
- * Club domestic league appearances and goals

Vojkan Miljković (Serbian Cyrillic: Војкан Миљковић; born 4 June 1991) is a Serbian footballer.

== Career ==
He passed the entire football school of FK Partizan and was captain of his generation, which featured Adem Ljajić, Marko Šćepović, and Miloš Ostojić. He made his debut for the first team of Partizan in the championship game against Čukarički under head coach Slaviša Jokanović.
