= Nenad Đorđević =

Serbian footballer (born 1979)

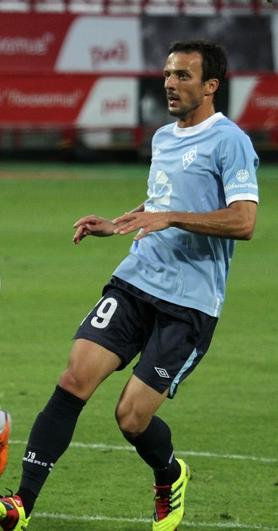
- Đorđević with FC Krylia Sovetov in 2011

Personal information
- Full name: Nenad Đorđević
- Date of birth: 7 August 1979 (age 47)
- Place of birth: Paraćin, SR Serbia, SFR Yugoslavia
- Height: 1.83 m (6 ft 0 in)
- Position: Defender

Youth career
- FK Zemun

Senior career*
| Years | Team | Apps | (Gls) |
| 1998–1999 | FK Jedinstvo Paraćin | 18 | (3) |
| 1999–2003 | FK Obilić | 97 | (3) |
| 2003–2007 | FK Partizan | 85 | (7) |
| 2007 | JEF United Chiba | 13 | (3) |
| 2008–2010 | FK Partizan | 50 | (7) |
| 2010–2012 | FC Krylia Sovetov Samara | 53 | (5) |
| 2012–2015 | Kalmar FF | 48 | (2) |
| 2016 | IFK Berga | 14 | (3) |
| Total | | 378 | (33) |

International career
| 2001 | FR Yugoslavia U21 (Note: Only official UEFA matches included) | 6 | (0) |
| 2002–2006 | Serbia and Montenegro | 17 | (1) |

Managerial career
- 2016: IFK Berga (player-assistant)
- 2017: Kalmar Södra IF (youth)
- 2018–2020: Kalmar FF (youth)
- 2021: Serbia U17 (assistant)
- 2021: Hammarby IF (assistant)
- 2022: Hammarby TFF
- 2023: Hammarby IF (assistant)
- 2023–: Al Wasl (assistant)
- * Club domestic league appearances and goals

Nenad Đorđević (Serbian Cyrillic: Ненад Ђорђевић; born 7 August 1979) is a Serbian professional football coach and former player who played as a defender. He is the assistant coach of Al Wasl in the UAE Pro League. At international level, Đorđević represented Serbia and Montenegro at the 2006 FIFA World Cup.

== Club career ==
Đorđević made his senior debut at Jedinstvo Paraćin, before joining Obilić in the 1999–2000 campaign. He spent four seasons with the Vitezovi, making a total of 97 league appearances. In July 2003, Đorđević was transferred to Partizan, penning a four-year deal. He immediately established himself as a first team regular under manager Lothar Matthäus, helping Partizan reach the group stage of the 2003–04 UEFA Champions League. In the following 2004–05 season, Đorđević won his first national championship title, as well as helped his team advance to the UEFA Cup round of 32. He made a total of 85 league appearances, before leaving the club in the 2007 winter transfer window.

In February 2007, Đorđević signed for Japanese club JEF United Chiba, penning a two-year contract. He made 13 league appearances and scored three goals in the 2007 season.

After just one year abroad, Đorđević returned to Partizan, penning a two-and-a-half-year contract on 29 January 2008. He played great after his return, especially in the first six months, when his goals directly decided the winner in a few games, thus being one of the most deserving for Partizan's title in the 2007–08 season, the club's first after three years. In the summer of 2008, after the departure of Stevan Jovetić to Fiorentina, Đorđević became the team's captain.

On 8 April 2010, Đorđević signed a two-year contract with Russian club Krylia Sovetov. He scored on his debut two days later in a league match against Saturn Ramenskoye, which his team won 2–1. On 22 February 2012, his contract was terminated by mutual consent.

On 27 February 2012, Đorđević signed a four-year contract for Swedish club Kalmar FF. He signed with IFK Berga ahead of the 2016 season.

== International career ==
Đorđević was capped 17 times for the Serbia and Montenegro national team, scoring one goal. He was also a member of the team at the 2006 FIFA World Cup, where he played his final international against Ivory Coast.

== Coaching career ==
On 18 November 2015 Đorđević announced, that he from the 2016 season would function as a playing assistant manager for IFK Berga. He announced his retirement from playing at the end of the season. In 2017, Đorđević was hired as a youth coach by local club Kalmar Södra IF.

On 18 November 2017, Đorđević returned to his former club Kalmar FF as a youth coach. He worked as the manager of the club's U16's, U17's and U19's, before leaving at the end of 2020.

On 6 September 2021, Đorđević was hired as an assistant coach by Hammarby IF in Allsvenskan, under head coach Miloš Milojević. He left the position at the end of the year when Milojević was sacked. On 2 February 2022, it was announced that Đorđević would become the head coach of the club's feeder team Hammarby TFF, eventually leading the side to finish 6th in the domestic third tier Ettan. In early 2023, Đorđević returned to the role as an assistant coach in Hammarby's senior squad, working with Martí Cifuentes.

He left Hammarby on 15 June 2023, becoming the assistant coach to his former colleague Miloš Milojević at Al Wasl in the UAE Pro League.

== Career statistics ==
=== Club ===
Appearances and goals by club, season and competition
| Club | Season | League | | Cup | | Continental | | Total | |
| Club | Season | Apps | Goals | Apps | Goals | Apps | Goals | Apps | Goals |
|---|---|---|---|---|---|---|---|---|---|
| Obilić | 1999–00 | 14 | 0 | | | — | | 14 | 0 |
| Obilić | 2000–01 | 23 | 0 | 3 | 0 | 2 | 0 | 28 | 0 |
| Obilić | 2001–02 | 27 | 0 | 2 | 0 | 4 | 0 | 33 | 0 |
| Obilić | 2002–03 | 33 | 3 | 3 | 2 | 2 | 0 | 38 | 5 |
| Obilić | Total | 97 | 3 | 8 | 2 | 8 | 0 | 113 | 5 |
| Partizan | 2003–04 | 25 | 2 | 3 | 1 | 9 | 0 | 37 | 3 |
| Partizan | 2004–05 | 27 | 2 | 3 | 0 | 12 | 0 | 42 | 2 |
| Partizan | 2005–06 | 20 | 1 | 2 | 0 | 4 | 0 | 26 | 1 |
| Partizan | 2006–07 | 13 | 2 | 0 | 0 | 8 | 0 | 21 | 2 |
| Partizan | Total | 85 | 7 | 8 | 1 | 33 | 0 | 126 | 8 |
| JEF United Chiba | 2007 | 13 | 3 | | | — | | 13 | 3 |
| Partizan | 2007–08 | 14 | 6 | 3 | 0 | 0 | 0 | 17 | 6 |
| Partizan | 2008–09 | 22 | 1 | 4 | 1 | 8 | 0 | 34 | 2 |
| Partizan | 2009–10 | 14 | 0 | 2 | 0 | 11 | 2 | 27 | 2 |
| Partizan | Total | 50 | 7 | 9 | 1 | 19 | 2 | 78 | 10 |
| Krylia Sovetov | 2010 | 24 | 3 | 0 | 0 | 0 | 0 | 24 | 3 |
| Krylia Sovetov | 2011–12 | 29 | 2 | 1 | 0 | — | | 30 | 2 |
| Krylia Sovetov | Total | 53 | 5 | 1 | 0 | 0 | 0 | 54 | 5 |
| Kalmar FF | 2012 | 17 | 0 | 1 | 0 | 6 | 1 | 24 | 1 |
| Kalmar FF | 2013 | 7 | 1 | 1 | 0 | 0 | 0 | 8 | 1 |
| Kalmar FF | 2014 | 16 | 1 | 1 | 0 | — | | 17 | 1 |
| Kalmar FF | 2015 | 8 | 0 | 0 | 0 | — | | 8 | 0 |
| Kalmar FF | Total | 48 | 2 | 3 | 0 | 6 | 1 | 57 | 3 |
| IFK Berga | 2016 | 14 | 3 | | | — | | 14 | 3 |
| Career total | | 360 | 30 | 29 | 4 | 66 | 3 | 455 | 37 |

=== International ===
Appearances and goals by national team and year
| National team | Year | Apps | Goals |
|---|---|---|---|
| FR Yugoslavia | 2002 | 2 | 0 |
| Serbia and Montenegro | 2003 | 6 | 0 |
| Serbia and Montenegro | 2004 | 3 | 0 |
| Serbia and Montenegro | 2005 | 3 | 1 |
| Serbia and Montenegro | 2006 | 3 | 0 |
| Total | | 17 | 1 |

== Honours ==
Partizan

- Serbian SuperLiga: 2004–05, 2007–08, 2008–09
- Serbian Cup: 2007–08, 2008–09

Individual

- Serbian SuperLiga Team of the Season: 2008–09
