= Radosav Petrović =

Serbian footballer (born 1989)

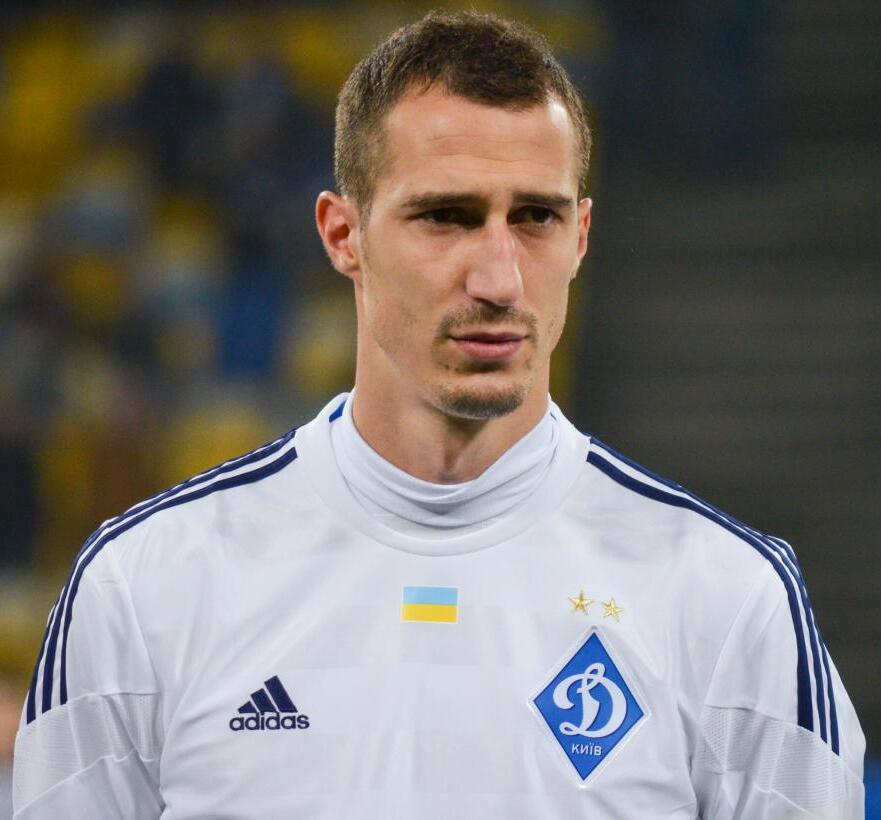
- Petrović with Dynamo Kyiv in 2016

Personal information
- Full name: Radosav Petrović
- Date of birth: 8 March 1989 (age 37)
- Place of birth: Ub, SR Serbia, SFR Yugoslavia
- Height: 1.93 m (6 ft 4 in)
- Position: Defensive midfielder

Team information
- Current team: Partizan (sporting director)

Youth career
- 1995–2006: Jedinstvo Ub

Senior career*
Years	Team	Apps	(Gls)
2006–2007	Jedinstvo Ub	16	(0)
2007–2008	Radnički Obrenovac	25	(1)
2008–2011	Partizan	70	(17)
2011–2012	Blackburn Rovers	19	(0)
2012–2015	Gençlerbirliği	77	(7)
2015–2016	Dynamo Kyiv	7	(1)
2016–2019	Sporting CP	16	(0)
2016–2017	→ Rio Ave (loan)	13	(0)
2019–2021	Almería	54	(1)
2021–2023	Zaragoza	37	(1)
2023	Ordabasy	11	(0)
2023–2025	APOEL	46	(1)
Total		391	(29)

International career^{‡}
2009–2015	Serbia	44	(2)
- * Club domestic league appearances and goals as of 30 May 2025 ‡ National team caps and goals as of 28 August 2018

Radosav Petrović (Serbian Cyrillic: Радосав Петровић, pronounced [rǎdosaʋ pětroʋitɕ]; born 8 March 1989) is a Serbian former professional footballer who played as a defensive midfielder. He represented Serbia at the 2010 FIFA World Cup. In July 2026, he was appointed the sporting director of Partizan.

== Club career ==
=== Early career ===
Petrović began playing football at his hometown club Jedinstvo Ub (where he gained the nickname Raća) and he played there for all youth ranks of the club, before making his senior debut during the 2006–07 season. After only a year of senior football for Jedinstvo, he moved to Radnički Obrenovac.

=== Partizan ===
2008–09 season

On 20 June 2008, Petrović completed a move to Partizan from Radnički Obrenovac. He signed a five-year contract and was given the number 20 shirt for Partizan. Petrović made his official debut for the club in a UEFA Champions League qualifier against Inter Baku on 6 August 2008, a game which Partizan won 2–0. On 21 May 2009, he scored his first goal for Partizan in a 3–0 Serbian Cup final match win over Sevojno. He also scored against Čukarički Stankom in the final Serbian SuperLiga game of the season.

2009–10 season

After the departure of Juca to Deportivo La Coruña, Petrović was given the number 8 shirt. He featured in total of 24 league matches and scored 7 goals in Partizan's title-winning campaign. His most notable moment of the season was a fantastic goal for a 1–0 win against cross-town rivals Crvena zvezda. He was also named in the 2009–10 Serbian SuperLiga Team of the Year.

2010–11 season

On 10 April 2011, Petrović made his 100th competitive match for Partizan and marked his jubilee with a goal from the penalty kick against Spartak Subotica. He was named in the Serbian SuperLiga Team of the Year for the second season in a row.

On 30 June 2011, SBV Vitesse announced on their official website that Petrović was on the way to move to the Netherlands. On the same day, Partizan confirmed the transfer with statement that Petrović would sign a five-year contract. However, few days later appeared information that the transfer failed due to problems with the amount of compensation to the player's agent.

=== Blackburn Rovers ===
On 24 July 2011, Serbian media revealed possible interest in Petrović from English Premier League (at the time) team Blackburn Rovers. The following day it was confirmed by Partizan that Rovers had bid for the young Serbian midfielder. It was later confirmed by Partizan that Petrović had been left behind from the club travelling to a pre-season tour ready for travelling to England to discuss personal terms when an offer was accepted. On 27 July it was reported that a fee had been agreed between Partizan and Rovers. On 26 July it was revealed that Petrović had arrived in England to undertake a medical. On 9 August 2011, a work permit was obtained and Petrović officially joined Blackburn Rovers. Petrović's full home-debut for the club was against Sheffield Wednesday on 24 August 2011 in the League Cup second round, in a game which Rovers won 3–1.

=== Gençlerbirliği ===
On 22 August 2012, Petrović signed for Turkish club Gençlerbirliği for an undisclosed fee.

=== Dynamo Kyiv ===
On 26 May 2015, Petrović signed a 5-year contract with the Ukrainian champions Dynamo Kyiv, joining them as a free agent. On 19 July 2015, Petrović made his first official debut for Dynamo in a 2–1 win against FC Stal in the Ukrainian Premier League. On 4 December 2015, Petrović scored his first goal for Dynamo in a 0–6 win against Metalurh Zaporizhzhia in the Ukrainian Premier League.

=== Sporting CP ===
On 14 June 2016, Petrović signed a 4-year contract with Portuguese club Sporting CP. He was loaned to Rio Ave the following year and played 13 games for them. Petrović finally made his league debut for Sporting as a second half substitute in a 2–1 win over Estoril.

On 15 May 2018, Petrović and several of his teammates, including coaches, were injured following an attack by around 50 supporters of Sporting at the club's training ground after the team finished third in the league and missed out on the UEFA Champions League qualification. Despite the events, he and the rest of the team agreed to play in the Portuguese Cup final scheduled for the following weekend, eventually losing to C.D. Aves.

=== Almería ===
On 19 August 2019, Petrović signed a three-year deal with Segunda División side UD Almería. He was a regular starter for the club as they missed out promotion in the play-offs twice.

On 10 August 2021, Petrović terminated his contract with the Andalusians.

=== Zaragoza ===
Hours after leaving Almería, Petrović signed a two-year contract with Real Zaragoza also in the Spanish second division. On 31 January 2023, he terminated his contract with the club.

== International career ==
Petrović made his international debut for the Serbia U21 squad in the first leg of the 2009 European Championship qualifying play-offs against Denmark U21 on 11 October 2008.

He made his debut for the Serbia national team against South Africa on 12 August 2009.

On 1 June 2010, Petrović was named in the final 23-man squad for the 2010 FIFA World Cup, where he appeared in group stage victory against Germany. He earned a total of 44 caps, scoring 2 goals and his final international was a November 2015 friendly match against the Czech Republic.

== Career statistics ==
=== Club ===
As of 4 May 2025

Club	Season	League		National cup		League cup		Continental		Other		Total	
Club	Season	Apps	Goals	Apps	Goals	Apps	Goals	Apps	Goals	Apps	Goals	Apps	Goals
Jedinstvo Ub	2006–07	16	0	—		—		—				16	0
Radnički Obrenovac	2007–08	25	1	—		—		—				25	1
Partizan	2008–09	21	1	3	1	—		6	0	—		30	2
Partizan	2009–10	24	7	2	1	—		10	1	—		36	9
Partizan	2010–11	25	9	5	0	—		11	0	—		41	9
Partizan	Total	70	17	10	2	—		27	1	—		107	20
Blackburn Rovers	2011–12	19	0	1	0	4	0	—		—		24	0
Gençlerbirliği	2012–13	27	3	2	0	—		—		—		29	3
Gençlerbirliği	2013–14	22	2	0	0	—		—		—		22	2
Gençlerbirliği	2014–15	28	2	5	3	—		—		—		33	5
Gençlerbirliği	Total	77	7	7	3	—		—		—		84	10
Dynamo Kyiv	2015–16	7	1	5	0	—		0	0	0	0	12	1
Sporting CP	2016–17	0	0	1	0	1	0	1	0	—		3	0
Sporting CP	2017–18	5	0	3	0	1	0	4	0	—		13	0
Sporting CP	2018–19	11	0	4	0	3	0	5	0	—		23	0
Sporting CP	Total	16	0	8	0	5	0	10	0	—		39	0
Rio Ave (loan)	2016–17	13	0	0	0	0	0	—		0	0	13	0
Almería	2019–20	27	1	0	0	—		—		1	0	28	1
Almería	2020–21	27	0	4	0	—		—		0	0	31	0
Almería	Total	54	1	4	0	—		—		1	0	59	1
Zaragoza	2021–22	28	1	1	0	—		—		—		29	1
Zaragoza	2022–23	9	0	0	0	—		—		—		9	0
Zaragoza	Total	37	1	1	0	—		—		—		38	1
Ordabasy	2023	11	0	2	0	—		0	0	1	0	14	0
APOEL	2023–24	31	1	1	0	—		6	0	—		38	1
APOEL	2024–25	15	0	2	0	—		11	0	1	0	29	0
APOEL	Total	46	1	3	0	—		17	0	1	0	67	1
Career total		391	29	41	5	9	0	54	1	3	0	498	35

=== International ===
As of match played 13 November 2015

Serbia national team
Year	Apps	Goals
2009	4	0
2010	9	0
2011	12	1
2012	3	0
2013	9	0
2014	3	1
2015	4	0
Total	44	2

==== International goals ====
Scores and results list Serbia's goal tally first.

#	Date	Venue	Opponent	Score	Result	Competition
1	3 June 2011	Seoul World Cup Stadium, Seoul	South Korea	1–2	1–2	Friendly
2	18 November 2014	Perivolia Municipal Stadium, Chania	Greece	1–0	2–0	Friendly

== Honours ==
Partizan

- Serbian SuperLiga: 2009, 2010, 2011
- Serbian Cup: 2009, 2011

Dynamo Kyiv

- Ukrainian Premier League: 2015–16

Sporting CP

- Taça da Liga: 2017–18, 2018–19
- Taça de Portugal: 2018–19

APOEL

- Cypriot First Division: 2023–24
- Cypriot Super Cup: 2024

Individual

- Serbian SuperLiga Team of the Season: 2009–10, 2010–11
