= Almami Moreira =

Guinea-Bissauan footballer (born 1978)

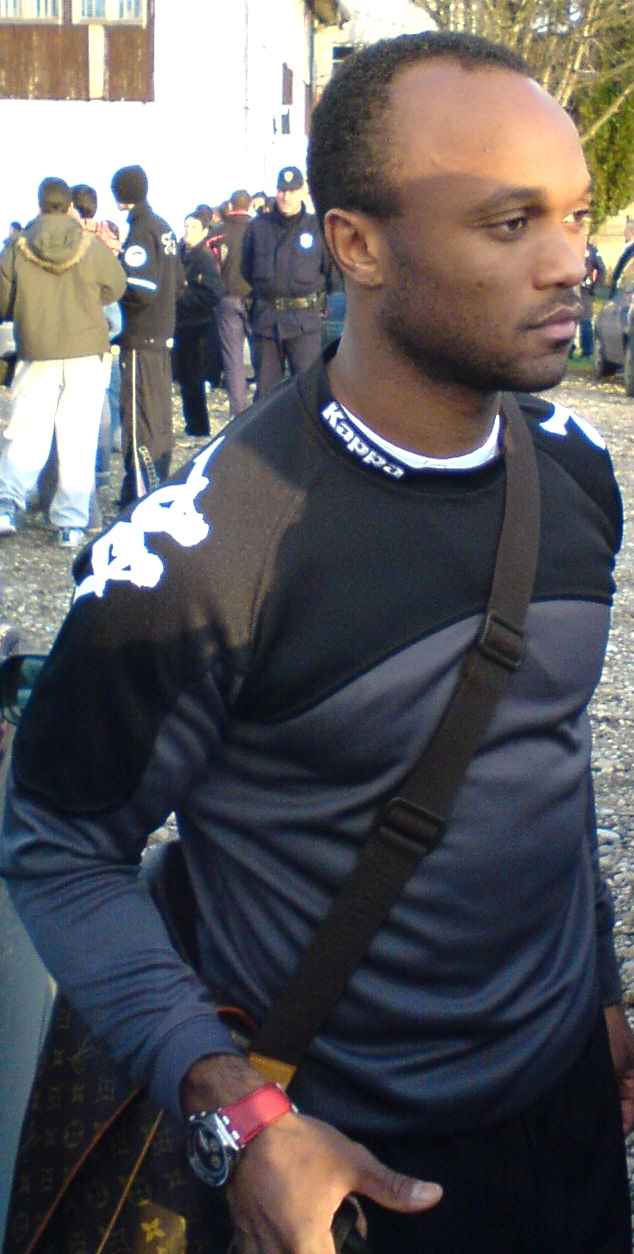
- Moreira with Partizan in 2008

Personal information
- Full name: Almami Samori da Silva Moreira
- Date of birth: 16 June 1978 (age 48)
- Place of birth: Bissau, Guinea-Bissau
- Height: 1.67 m (5 ft 6 in)
- Position: Midfielder

Youth career
- 1991–1994: Sacavenense
- 1994–1997: Boavista

Senior career*
Years	Team	Apps	(Gls)
1997–2001	Boavista	17	(1)
1997–1998	→ Gondomar (loan)	24	(13)
1998–1999	→ Gil Vicente (loan)	33	(9)
2001–2006	Standard Liège	114	(18)
2004–2005	→ Hamburger SV (loan)	22	(3)
2006	Dynamo Moscow	1	(0)
2007	Aves	8	(3)
2007–2011	Partizan	88	(23)
2011	Dalian Aerbin	22	(4)
2012	Vojvodina	22	(1)
2013	Salamanca	15	(4)
2014	Atlético CP	11	(3)
Total		377	(82)

International career
1998–1999	Portugal U21	12	(5)
2002	Portugal B	2	(0)
2010–2011	Guinea-Bissau	6	(0)
- * Club domestic league appearances and goals

Almami Samori da Silva Moreira (born 16 June 1978) is a Bissau-Guinean retired footballer who played as a midfielder. He also holds Portuguese citizenship.

After starting out at Boavista he went on to represent mainly Standard Liège and Partizan, also playing professionally in four other countries during his career.

== Club career ==
=== Boavista ===
Born in Bissau, Guinea-Bissau, Moreira reached Boavista's youth ranks in 1994, but started out professionally with northern neighbours Gondomar and Gil Vicente, on loan.

He returned in 1999 and went on to have relative impact in the first team, being mainly used as a substitute and being part of the squad as the club won the Primeira Liga in his last year, although he did not appear in any matches whatsoever due to a contract dispute.

=== Belgium and Russia ===
With the start of the new millennium Moreira moved to Standard Liège, where he quickly became a fan favourite, going on to spend five years in Belgium, a loan to Hamburger SV in 2004–05 notwithstanding.

In August 2006, he joined Russia's Dynamo Moscow, a club that was signing a large number of Portuguese and Portugal-based players at the time. Unsettled as the vast majority of those, he returned to his country of adoption in January, as lowly Aves battled to avoid relegation from the top level, which eventually did not happen.

=== Partizan ===
On 5 July 2007, Moreira signed a two-year contract with FK Partizan in Serbia, being handed the #10 shirt whilst also becoming the first Portuguese player to represent the club. Very quickly he became the leading player of the team with which he managed to win two Doubles in a row, which happened for the first time in the history of the club. He made his competitive debut on 19 July in a match against HŠK Zrinjski Mostar, and scored his first official goal on 2 August in a UEFA Cup fixture against the same club.

On 29 September 2007, Moreira scored against city rivals Red Star in a 2–2 draw – this made him the first ever Portuguese to score in a Belgrade derby. In his first season at the club he appeared 28 times and netted seven times, as Partizan won the league title; to this he added the domestic cup.

In a UEFA Cup match at Sevilla, on 3 December 2008, Moreira collapsed early into the game, being immediately taken into observation, and fully recovering. On 10 April 2009, he agreed to sign a new three-year contract, running until 2012.

Following impressive and consistent performances, Moreira was named in the 2008–09 SuperLiga Team of the Year, alongside seven teammates, as the double was again conquered – he was also voted as the club's Player of the Year in 2008 by the fans. On 28 February 2009, he scored the 1–1 equaliser at home against Red Star; on 5 August, grieving the loss of his mother a day earlier, he decided to play in the second leg of his team's UEFA Champions League qualifier against APOEL: he scored the opener in the third minute, but the Cypriots eventually progressed 2–1 on aggregate.

On 27 February 2010, Moreira made his 100th competitive match for Partizan, coming on as a 55th-minute substitute for Saša Ilić against Borac Čačak. He missed several games at the beginning of the following campaign due to injury, returning to action on 15 October in a 5–3 home league victory over FK Smederevo where he provided two assists. Four days later he made his Champions League debut, in a 2–0 group stage away loss to Braga; late in the same month, he scored the only goal at Red Star for the domestic league.

=== Later years ===
Moreira split the following years with Dalian Aerbin in China and another team in Serbia, Vojvodina. In late 2012 the 34-year-old moved clubs and countries again, joining Spain's Salamanca.

Moreira retired in 2013 at the age of 35, being named Atlético Clube de Portugal's director of football. He came out of retirement in January of the following year, after being convinced by newly appointed coach Neca.

== International career ==
Moreira played for Portugal under-21s on 12 occasions in the late 1990s, and in 2002 he was part of the national B-team that won the Vale do Tejo summer tournament.

In 2010, with the increasing development and professionalization of football in Guinea-Bissau, he decided to represent his country of birth at the senior level, earning his first cap in October of that year at the age of 32.

== Personal life ==
His son Diego is also a professional footballer.

== Career statistics ==
=== Club ===
Appearances and goals by club, season and competition
Club	Season	League			National cup (Note: Includes Taça de Portugal, Belgian Cup, DFB-Pokal, Russian Cup, Serbian Cup)		Continental		Total	
Club	Season	Division	Apps	Goals	Apps	Goals	Apps	Goals	Apps	Goals
Boavista	1999–2000	Primeira Liga	17	1	3	0	2	1	22	2
Boavista	2000–01	Primeira Liga	0	0	0	0	–		0	0
Boavista	Total		17	1	3	0	2	1	22	2
Standard Liège	2001–02	Belgian Pro League	26	6	1	1	5 (Note: Appearances in UEFA Cup)	2	32	9
Standard Liège	2002–03	Belgian Pro League	32	6	4	0	–		36	6
Standard Liège	2003–04	Belgian Pro League	27	4	1	0	–		28	4
Standard Liège	2004–05	Belgian Pro League	3	0	0	0	0	0	3	0
Standard Liège	2005–06	Belgian Pro League	26	2	4	0	–		30	2
Standard Liège	Total		114	18	10	1	5	2	129	21
Hamburger SV	2004–05	Bundesliga	22	3	0	0	–		22	3
Dynamo Moscow	2006	Russian Premier League	1	0	1	0	–		2	0
Aves	2006–07	Primeira Liga	8	3	0	0	–		8	3
Partizan	2007–08	Serbian SuperLiga	28	7	3	0	2	1	33	8
Partizan	2008–09	Serbian SuperLiga	27	9	5	2	9 (Note: Three appearances in UEFA Champions League, six appearances in UEFA Cup)	0	41	11
Partizan	2009–10	Serbian SuperLiga	25	3	4	1	11 (Note: Four appearances and one goal in UEFA Champions League, seven appearances in UEFA Europa League)	1	40	5
Partizan	2010–11|	Serbian SuperLiga	8	4	2	1	8 (Note: Appearances in UEFA Champions League)	1	18	6
Partizan	Total		88	23	14	4	30	3	132	30
Dalian Aerbin	2011	China League One	22	4	0	0	–		22	4
Vojvodina	2011–12	Serbian SuperLiga	9	0	2	0	0	0	11	0
Vojvodina	2012–13	Serbian SuperLiga	13	1	3	0	4 (Note: Appearances in UEFA Europa League)	1	20	2
Vojvodina	Total		22	1	5	0	4	1	31	2
Salamanca	2012–13	Segunda División B	15	4	0	0	–		15	4
Atlético Clube de Portugal	2013–14	Liga Portugal 2	11	3	0	0	–		11	3
Career total			320	60	33	5	41	7	394	72

== Honours ==
Partizan

- Serbian SuperLiga: 2007–08, 2008–09, 2009–10, 2010–11
- Serbian Cup: 2007–08, 2008–09, 2010–11

Dalian Aerbin

- China League One: 2011

Individual

- Man of the Season – Most regular Standard player of the season (through voting in official website): 2001–02; runner-up 2002–03, 2003–04; Third 2005–06
- Trophy Scharlaken UGH – Standard player of the season (presented by Les Rouches de Flandres fanclub in cooperation with the official website): 2001–02, 2002–03
- Serbian SuperLiga Team of the Season: 2008–09, 2009–10
- Partizan Player of the Year: 2008
