= Juca (footballer, born 1979) =

Brazilian footballer

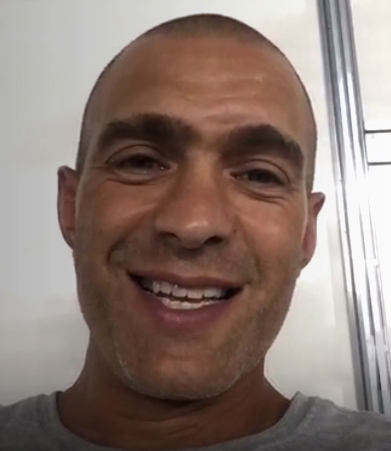
- Juca in 2022

Personal information
- Full name: Juliano Roberto Antonello
- Date of birth: 19 November 1979 (age 47)
- Place of birth: Passo Fundo, Brazil
- Height: 1.79 m (5 ft 10 1/2 in)
- Position: Defensive midfielder

Team information
- Current team: Vila Nova (assistant)

Youth career
- Internacional

Senior career*
Years	Team	Apps	(Gls)
2000–2001	Internacional	23	(3)
2002–2003	Criciúma	40	(5)
2003	Marília	20	(5)
2004	Fluminense	26	(0)
2005	Botafogo	29	(4)
2006	Guarani	1	(0)
2006–2007	Botafogo	13	(2)
2007–2009	Partizan	43	(7)
2009–2011	Deportivo La Coruña	24	(3)
2011–2012	Ceará	25	(2)
2013	Dubai	12	(0)
2014	Novo Hamburgo	0	(0)
Total		256	(31)

Managerial career
- 2014: Ceará U17
- 2015: Internacional U17
- 2017–2020: Resende (assistant)
- 2021–2022: Ceará U20
- 2022: Ceará (assistant)
- 2022: Ceará (interim)
- 2023: Athletico Paranaense U20
- 2023–2024: Athletico Paranaense (assistant)
- 2024: Athletico Paranaense (interim)
- 2025: Gaúcho
- 2026–: Vila Nova (assistant)
- * Club domestic league appearances and goals

Juliano Roberto Antonello (born 19 November 1979), commonly known as Juca, is a Brazilian football coach and former player who played as a defensive midfielder. He is the current assistant coach of Vila Nova.

Juca is best known for his tackling, good teamwork and powerful shooting ability.

== Career ==
Born in Passo Fundo (RS), Juca came through the youth categories of Internacional, making his senior debuts in 2000. He later went on to play for several clubs in his homeland, namely Criciúma, Marília, Fluminense, Botafogo (two spells), and Guarani.

On 15 June 2007, Juca completed his move to Partizan on a two-year deal, becoming the first ever Brazilian player to join the club. He made his official debut for Partizan on 19 July 2007, helping his team to a 6–1 away win over Zrinjski in the first leg of the UEFA Cup first qualifying round. Juca scored his first competitive goal for the club on 26 September 2007 in a 4–1 Serbian Cup win over Rad. His first season in Serbia was a success with Juca helping Partizan win the national league and cup titles. In his second season at Partizan, Juca appeared 18 times and scored two goals, winning another double.

In June 2009, Juca moved to Spain on a free transfer to play for Deportivo La Coruña. He signed a contract which would keep him at the club until June 2011. Juca made his La Liga debut on 29 August 2009, playing the full 90 minutes in a 2–3 loss against Real Madrid at Santiago Bernabéu. He scored his first goal for the club on 23 September 2009, as Deportivo won 3–0 against Xerez.

In September 2011, after four years abroad, Juca returned to Brazil and signed with Ceará. He played there until the end of the 2012 season. In January 2013, Juca moved to the United Arab Emirates and joined Dubai until the end of the 2012–13 season.

On 2 January 2014, after six months without a club, Juca made another return to his country and joined Novo Hamburgo. He was eventually released by the club only two weeks later, without making his official debut.

== Statistics ==
Club	Season	League		State League		Cup		League Cup		Continental		Total	
Club	Season	Apps	Goals	Apps	Goals	Apps	Goals	Apps	Goals	Apps	Goals	Apps	Goals
Internacional	2000	12	1			4	1	—		—		16	2
Internacional	2001	11	2			1	0	—		—		12	2
Criciúma	2002	28	5	15	4	2	0	—		—		45	9
Criciúma	2003	12	0	8	0	3	1	—		—		23	1
Marília	2003	20	5			0	0	—		—		20	5
Fluminense	2004	26	0			5	0	—		—		31	0
Botafogo	2005	29	4			1	1	—		—		30	5
Guarani	2006	1	0	6	0	3	1	—		—		10	1
Botafogo	2006	11	2			0	0	—		0	0	11	2
Botafogo	2007	2	0			2	0	—		0	0	4	0
Partizan	2007–08	25	5	—		4	2	—		2	0	31	7
Partizan	2008–09	18	2	—		2	0	—		8	1	28	3
Deportivo La Coruña	2009–10	16	3	—		3	0	—		—		19	3
Deportivo La Coruña	2010–11	8	0	—		3	0	—		—		11	0
Ceará	2011	5	0	0	0	0	0	—		0	0	5	0
Ceará	2012	20	2	13	1	0	0	—		—		33	3
Dubai	2012–13	12	0	—		0	0	3	1	—		15	1
Club performance		League		State League		Cup		League Cup		Continental		Total	
Brazil		177	21	42	5	21	4	—		0	0	240	30
Serbia		43	7	—		6	2	—		10	1	59	10
Spain		24	3	—		6	0	—		—		30	3
United Arab Emirates		12	0	—		0	0	3	1	—		15	1
Career total		256	31	42	5	33	6	3	1	10	1	344	44

== Honours ==
Criciúma

- Campeonato Brasileiro Série B: 2002

Partizan

- Serbian SuperLiga: 2007–08, 2008–09
- Serbian Cup: 2007–08, 2008–09

Ceará

- Campeonato Cearense: 2012
