= Danijel Marčeta =

Slovenian footballer

Personal information
- Full name: Danijel Marčeta
- Date of birth: 4 January 1989 (age 37)
- Place of birth: Kranj, SFR Yugoslavia
- Height: 1.75 m (5 ft 9 in)
- Position: Attacking midfielder

Senior career*
Years	Team	Apps	(Gls)
2007–2008	Triglav Kranj	37	(5)
2009–2010	Partizan	2	(0)
2009–2010	→ Falkirk (loan)	15	(0)
2010–2012	Koper	35	(4)
2012–2014	Virtus Lanciano	4	(0)
2015	Triglav Kranj	3	(0)
2017–2019	Sava Kranj	26	(13)

International career^{‡}
2007	Slovenia U18	9	(0)
2006–2007	Slovenia U19	7	(0)
2008–2009	Slovenia U20	3	(1)
2009–2010	Slovenia U21	11	(1)
- * Club domestic league appearances and goals as of 27 October 2017 ‡ National team caps and goals as of 27 October 2017

Danijel Marčeta (born 4 January 1989) is a Slovenian footballer who most recently played for Sava Kranj.

== Club career ==
Marčeta started his career with his hometown team Triglav Kranj at the age of 18 in 2007. In his first season with Triglav in 2. SNL he played four games. In the all three seasons at the club, he made 37 appearances and scored 5 goals for Triglav.

On 6 February 2009, it was announced that Marčeta had signed for Partizan on a four-year contract. He was given the number 16 shirt for Partizan. He made his debut for Partizan against Javor Ivanjica on 18 April 2009 in the Serbian SuperLiga.

On 22 July 2009, Marčeta joined Scottish Premier League side Falkirk on an initial one-year loan. He made his debut for Falkirk on 15 August 2009 against Rangers coming on as a substitute for Tom Scobbie in the 46th minute.

In summer 2012, after playing two seasons back home with FC Koper in the Slovenian First League, he moved abroad again, this time by joining S.S. Virtus Lanciano 1924 a newly promoted side of the Italian Serie B.

== International career ==
Marčeta made his first appearance for the Slovenia U21 on 11 February 2009, in a friendly match against Romania U21.

== Career statistics ==
Season	Club	Competition	Apps	Goals
2006–07	Triglav Kranj	2. SNL	4	0
2007–08	Triglav Kranj	2. SNL	20	2
2008–09	Triglav Kranj	2. SNL	13	3
2008–09	Partizan	SuperLiga	2	0
2009–10	Falkirk	Premier League	15	0
2010–11	Koper	1. SNL	24	4
2011–12	Koper	1. SNL	11	0
2012–13	Virtus Lanciano	Serie B	4	0
Total			89	9
