= Washington (footballer, born 1985) =

Brazilian footballer

Personal information
- Full name: Washington Roberto Mariano da Silva
- Date of birth: 19 June 1985 (age 41)
- Place of birth: Cataguases, Brazil
- Height: 2.02 m (6 ft 8 in)
- Position: Centre forward

Senior career*
Years	Team	Apps	(Gls)
2005–2007	Metropolitano	–	(–)
2006	→ Cruzeiro (RS) (loan)	–	(–)
2007	→ Videira (loan)	–	(–)
2007–2008	Universal	–	(–)
2008	→ Igaci (loan)	–	(–)
2008–2009	Makedonija GP	15	(9)
2009–2011	Partizan	18	(4)
2010–2011	→ Borac Čačak (loan)	12	(2)
2015	Nacional (MG)	–	(–)
- * Club domestic league appearances and goals

Washington Roberto Mariano da Silva (born 19 June 1985) is a Brazilian footballer.

== Club career ==
=== Brazil ===
Washington started his professional career with Atlético Metropolitano, signed a 5-year contract in May 2005. In March 2006 he was loaned to Cruzeiro de Porto Alegre until the end of 2006 Campeonato Gaúcho Second Division. After played for Metropolitano in 2007 Campeonato Catarinense, he was loaned to Videira in May until the end of 2007 Campeonato Catarinense Divisão Especial. In September he was sold to Universal, finished as the runner-up of 2007 Campeonato Alagoano Second Division. He was loaned to the second division winner Igaci until the end of 2008 Campeonato Alagoano First Division. He scored a brace before he was released by Igaci in the mid-season.

=== Partizan ===
He left for Republic of Macedonia team Makedonija Gjorče Petrov in July 2008. He scored 9 goals in half-season.

On 10 January 2009, Washington was presented as a new signing of Partizan. He made his debut for Partizan against Red Star on 28 February 2009 in the Serbian SuperLiga, the game ended 1–1. He scored his first competitive goal on 15 April 2009 in a Serbian Cup match against FK Hajduk Beograd. His first two goals for Partizan in SuperLiga came on 26 April 2009 against OFK Beograd in a 4–1 home win.
