= Ivan Stevanović (footballer) =

Serbian footballer

Personal information
- Full name: Ivan Stevanović
- Date of birth: 24 June 1983 (age 43)
- Place of birth: Čačak, SFR Yugoslavia
- Height: 1.83 m (6 ft 0 in)
- Position: Right-back

Youth career
- 1998–2003: Borac Čačak

Senior career*
Years	Team	Apps	(Gls)
2003–2006	Borac Čačak	59	(2)
2006–2008	OFK Beograd	67	(1)
2008–2009	Partizan	26	(1)
2009–2012	Sochaux	6	(0)
2010–2011	→ Partizan (loan)	8	(0)
Total		166	(4)

International career
2007	Serbia	1	(0)
- * Club domestic league appearances and goals

Ivan Stevanović (Serbian Cyrillic: Иван Стевановић; born 24 June 1983) is a Serbian retired footballer.

== Club career ==
Stevanović's transfer to FK Partizan was announced on 5 June 2008, with Ivan signing a three-year contract with the possibility of a one-year extension. The Serbian international is believed to have been signed as a replacement for the recently departed Nemanja Rnić who left on a free transfer to RSC Anderlecht.

In early July 2009, Stevanović was reported to be set to join the French club FC Sochaux-Montbéliard for a fee believed to be around €1 million and signed one day later a contract until June 2012. On 17 June 2010, Partizan loaned for one season the right-back, the 26-year-old returned to Partizan who played in the 2008–09 season.

== International career ==
Serbian then coach Javier Clemente named 10 uncapped players in his 20-man squad for the rescheduled Euro 2008 qualifier at home to Kazakhstan on Saturday, 24 November 2007, which included Stevanović. He played the whole match, earning his sole international cap.
