= 2010–11 FK Partizan season =

Partizan
2010–11 season
- President: Dragan Đurić
- Head coach: Aleksandar Stanojević
- Serbian SuperLiga: 1st
- Serbian Cup: Winners
- UEFA Champions League: Group stage (4th)
- Top goalscorer: League: Ivica Iliev (13 goals); All: Cléo (20 goals)
- Highest home attendance: 29,348 v Arsenal (28 September 2010)
- Lowest home attendance: 2,243 v Metalac (28 November 2010)
Home colours	Away colours	Third colours

The 2010–11 season was FK Partizan's 5th season in Serbian SuperLiga. This article shows player statistics and all matches (official and friendly) that the club had and who played during the 2010–11 season.

== Competitions ==
	Competition	Position
(Serbia)	Serbian SuperLiga	Winners
(Serbia)	Serbian Cup	Winners
(European Union)	UEFA Champions League	Group stage

== Players ==
Note: Flags indicate national team as defined under FIFA eligibility rules; some limited exceptions apply. Players may hold more than one non-FIFA nationality.

No.	Pos.	Nation	Player
2	DF	SRB	Aleksandar Miljković
3	DF	SRB	Ivan Stevanović
4	MF	FIN	Medo
5	MF	SRB	Ljubomir Fejsa
6	DF	SRB	Vojislav Stanković
7	MF	SRB	Nemanja Tomić
8	MF	SRB	Radosav Petrović
9	FW	BRA	Cléo
10	MF	POR	Almami Moreira
11	FW	CMR	Pierre Boya
12	GK	SRB	Zivko Zivkovic
13	DF	SRB	Marko Jovanović
14	MF	SRB	Darko Brašanac
15	DF	MNE	Stefan Savić

No.	Pos.	Nation	Player
18	DF	MKD	Aleksandar Lazevski
19	FW	SRB	Miloš Bogunović
20	DF	SRB	Mladen Krstajić (captain)
22	MF	SRB	Saša Ilić (vice-captain)
23	MF	SRB	Aleksandar Davidov
25	MF	SRB	Stefan Babović
27	DF	UGA	Joseph Kizito
28	FW	GHA	Prince Tagoe
31	FW	SRB	Marko Šćepović
33	GK	SRB	Radiša Ilić
77	FW	SRB	Ivica Iliev
80	MF	SRB	Zvonimir Vukić
88	GK	SRB	Vladimir Stojković
99	MF	SRB	Milan Smiljanić

=== Top scorers ===
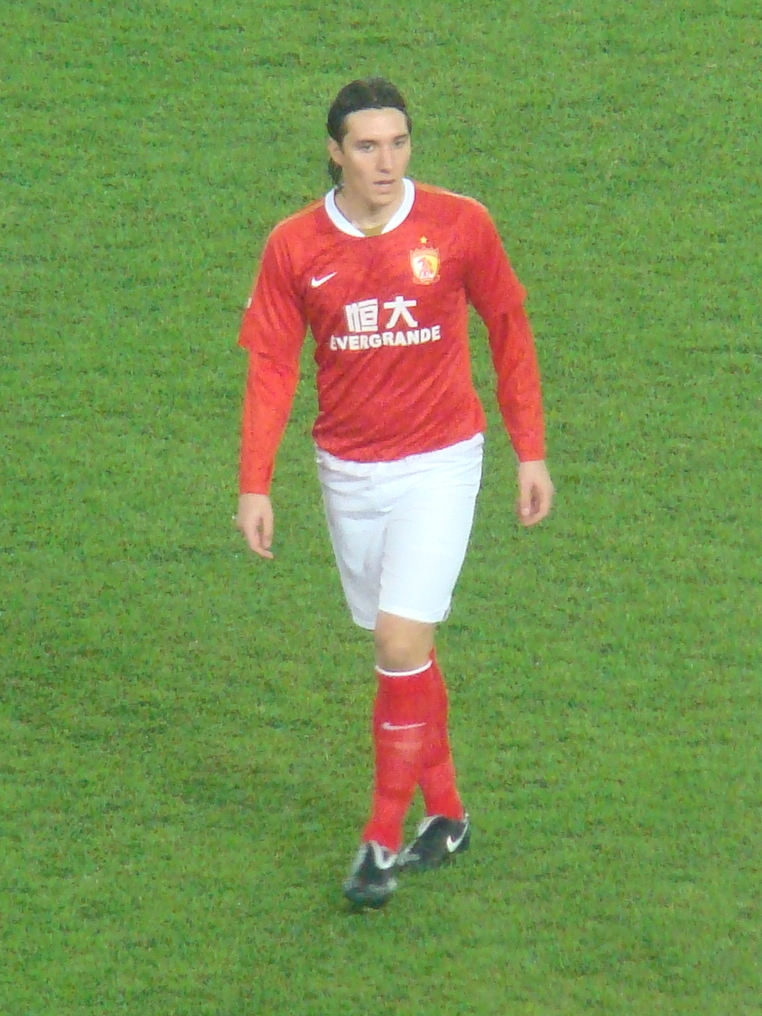
Cleo scored 20 goals in 27 matches

Includes all competitive matches. The list is sorted by shirt number when total goals are equal.

Position	Nation	Number	Name	League	Cup	Europe	Total
1	(Brazil) (Serbia)	9	Cleo	8	2	10	20
2	(Serbia)	77	Ivica Iliev	13	1	1	15
3	(Ghana)	28	Prince Tagoe	9	3	0	12
4	(Serbia)	31	Marko Šćepović	6	4	0	10
5	(Serbia)	25	Stefan Babović	8	2	0	10
6	(Serbia)	8	Radosav Petrović	9	0	0	9
7	(Guinea-Bissau)	10	Almami Moreira	4	1	1	6

=== Squad statistics ===
No.	Pos.	Name	League		Cup		Europe		Total		Discipline	
No.	Pos.	Name	Apps	Goals	Apps	Goals	Apps	Goals	Apps	Goals	Yellow card	Red card
Goalkeepers
12	GK	(Serbia) Živko Živković	1	0	1	0	0	0	2	0	0	0
33	GK	(Serbia) Radiša Ilić	3	0	1	0	6	0	10	0	0	0
88	GK	(Serbia) Vladimir Stojković	26	0	4	0	6	0	36	0	4	0
Defenders
2	DF	(Serbia) Aleksandar Miljković	22	2	3	0	3	0	28	2	1	0
3	DF	(Serbia) Ivan Stevanović	8	0	3	0	8	0	19	0	6	0
6	DF	(Serbia) Vojislav Stanković	8	0	1	0	5	0	14	0	1	0
13	DF	(Serbia) Marko Jovanović	18	0	4	0	10	0	32	0	4	1
15	DF	(Montenegro) Stefan Savić	20	1	4	0	4	0	28	1	2	0
18	DF	(North Macedonia) Aleksandar Lazevski	13	1	2	0	11	0	26	1	1	0
20	DF	(Serbia) Mladen Krstajić	21	1	4	0	12	0	37	1	7	0
21	MF	(Serbia) Branislav Jovanović	0	0	0	0	4	0	4	0	1	0
27	DF	(Uganda) Joseph Kizito	14	0	2	0	1	0	17	0	2	0
34	MF	(Serbia) Nikola Aksentijević	0	0	1	0	0	0	1	0	0	0
Midfielders
4	MF	(Sierra Leone) Medo	18	0	6	0	5	0	29	0	3	0
5	MF	(Serbia) Ljubomir Fejsa	2	0	0	0	0	0	2	0	0	0
7	MF	(Serbia) Nemanja Tomić	23	4	3	0	9	1	35	5	3	1
8	MF	(Serbia) Radosav Petrović	25	9	5	0	11	0	41	9	7	0
10	MF	(Portugal) Almami Moreira	8	4	2	1	8	1	18	6	3	0
14	MF	(Serbia) Darko Brašanac	4	0	1	0	1	0	6	0	0	0
22	MF	(Serbia) Saša Ilić	25	1	5	1	12	1	42	3	7	0
23	MF	(Serbia) Aleksandar Davidov	13	0	3	1	8	0	24	1	1	0
25	MF	(Serbia) Stefan Babović	22	8	4	2	4	0	30	10	6	0
50	MF	(Serbia) Lazar Marković	1	0	0	0	0	0	1	0	0	0
80	MF	(Serbia) Zvonimir Vukić	13	3	1	1	0	0	14	4	2	0
99	MF	(Serbia) Milan Smiljanić	18	1	3	0	7	0	28	1	7	1
Forwards
9	FW	(Brazil) Cléo	14	8	1	2	12	10	27	20	2	0
11	FW	(Cameroon) Pierre Boya	7	3	2	1	4	0	13	4	1	0
19	FW	(Serbia) Miloš Bogunović	6	1	3	0	3	0	12	1	0	0
28	FW	(Ghana) Prince Tagoe	15	9	3	3	0	0	18	12	4	0
31	FW	(Serbia) Marko Šćepović	19	6	3	4	4	0	26	10	2	0
77	FW	(Serbia) Ivica Iliev	27	13	4	1	8	1	39	15	2	0

== Competitions ==
=== Overview ===
Competition	Record							
Competition	P	W	D	L	GF	GA	GD	Win %
Superliga	30	24	4	2	75	21	+54	80.00
Serbian Cup	6	5	0	1	18	1	+17	83.33
UEFA Champions League	12	4	2	6	15	19	−4	33.33
Total	48	33	6	9	108	41	+67	68.75

==== League table ====
Pos	Team	Pld	W	D	L	GF	GA	GD	Pts	Qualification or relegation
1	Partizan (C)	30	24	4	2	75	21	+54	76	Qualification for Champions League second qualifying round
2	Red Star Belgrade	30	22	4	4	52	18	+34	70	Qualification for Europa League third qualifying round (Note: Partizan won the 2010–11 Serbian Cup against Vojvodina. Since both teams will achieve a spot for the European competitions via their final placement, the allocation of the 2011–12 UEFA Europa League spots will be based on final league positions, with the fourth-placed team also qualifying for the competition.)
3	Vojvodina	30	20	7	3	44	14	+30	67	Qualification for Europa League second qualifying round
4	Rad	30	14	10	6	38	21	+17	52	Qualification for Europa League first qualifying round
5	Spartak Zlatibor Voda	30	11	10	9	34	27	+7	43	

Source: SuperLiga
Rules for classification: 1) points; 2) head-to-head points; 3) head-to-head goal difference; 4) head-to-head goals scored; 5) goal difference; 6) number of goals scored.
(C) Champions

==== Matches ====
14 August 2010 1	Partizan	2–1	Inđija	Belgrade
19:30	Cléo 2'; Petrović 80'	Report	Ljubinković 90+2'	Stadium: Partizan Stadium; Attendance: 5,000; Referee: Darko Bogdanović

4 September 2010* 2	Partizan	2–0	Hajduk Kula	Belgrade
20:00	Cléo 30'; Šćepović 61'	Report		Stadium: Partizan Stadium; Attendance: 6,125; Referee: Svetislav Marušić

29 August 2010 3	OFK Beograd	0–2	Partizan	Belgrade
17:00	Iliev 10'; Tomić 45+1'	Report		Stadium: Omladinski Stadium; Attendance: 6,000; Referee: Dragomir Stanković

11 September 2010 4	Partizan	3–0	Rad	Belgrade
19:00	Boya 48', 77'; Petrović 69'	Report		Stadium: Partizan Stadium; Attendance: 5,125; Referee: Slobodan Veselinović

19 September 2010 5	Borac Čačak	0–2	Partizan	Čačak
15:30		Report	Cléo 71'; Bogunović 86'	Stadium: Čačak Stadium; Attendance: 4,000; Referee: Milorad Mažić

24 September 2010 6	Partizan	0–0	Spartak Subotica	Belgrade
19:00		Report		Stadium: Partizan Stadium; Attendance: 6,295; Referee: Boško Jovanetić

3 October 2010 7	Vojvodina	2–0	Partizan	Novi Sad
15:30	Gjurovski 28' (pen.); Merebashvili 57'	Report		Stadium: Karađorđe Stadium; Attendance: 11,000; Referee: Vlado Glođović

15 October 2010 8	Partizan	5–3	Smederevo	Belgrade
18:00	Iliev 15'; Šćepović 17', 58'; Boya 56'; Petrović 79'	Report	Ranković 13', 72'; Ćeran 46'	Stadium: Partizan Stadium; Attendance: 4,137; Referee: Bojan Stojanović

23 October 2010 9	Red Star	0–1	Partizan	Belgrade
13:00		Report	Moreira 6'	Stadium: Marakana; Attendance: 31,153; Referee: Slobodan Veselinović

30 October 2010 10	Partizan	3–0	Jagodina	Belgrade
16:00	Moreira 52'; Iliev 86'; Petrović 90+3' (pen.)	Report		Stadium: Partizan Stadium; Attendance: 3,467; Referee: Miodrag Gogić

7 November 2010 11	BSK Borča	0–3	Partizan	Belgrade
13:00		Report	Šćepović 10'; Petrović 86'; Moreira 90'	Stadium: Omladinski Stadium; Attendance: 3,000; Referee: Milenko Vukadinović

13 November 2010 12	Partizan	4–1	Javor	Belgrade
18:00	Iliev 38'; Babović 59'; Cléo 68'; Petrović 88'	Report	Gogić 90+2'	Stadium: Partizan Stadium; Attendance: 5,153; Referee: Danilo Grujić

20 November 2010 13	Čukarički	2–4	Partizan	Belgrade
13:00	Cakić 74', 90+3'	Report	Iliev 7'; Babović 23'; Moreira 30'; Cléo 56'	Stadium: Čukarički Stadium; Attendance: 2,000; Referee: Dejan Dimitrijević

28 November 2010 14	Partizan	5–0	Metalac	Belgrade
17:00	Babović 39', 88'; Cléo 41'; Iliev 48', 52'	Report		Stadium: Partizan Stadium; Attendance: 2,243; Referee: Novica Anđelovski

4 December 2010 15	Partizan	5–2	Sloboda	Belgrade
13:00	Cléo 1', 6'; Petrović 13'; Babović 25'; Iliev 72'	Report	Stevančević 65'; Ademović 77'	Stadium: Partizan Stadium; Attendance: 4,467; Referee: Dejan Santrač

5 March 2011 16	Inđija	1–3	Partizan	Inđija
13:00	Davidov 31'	Report	Tagoe 13', 63'; Iliev 50'	Stadium: Inđija Stadium; Attendance: 3,000; Referee: Svetislav Marušić

9 March 2011 17	Hajduk Kula	0–4	Partizan	Kula
14:00		Report	Tagoe 7'; Tomić 58'; Petrović 68' (pen.); Šćepović 84'	Stadium: Stadion Hajduk; Attendance: 2,500; Referee: Danilo Mihajlović

12 March 2011 18	Partizan	2–1	OFK Beograd	Belgrade
15:00	Tagoe 56'; Smiljanić 89'	Report	Rodić 86'	Stadium: Partizan Stadium; Attendance: 11,879; Referee: Dragan Krstić

20 March 2011 19	Rad	2–2	Partizan	Belgrade
14:00	Pajović 36'; Leković 41'	Report	Tomić 16'; Iliev 57'	Stadium: Stadion Hajduk; Attendance: 3,000; Referee: Milenko Vukadinović

2 April 2011 20	Partizan	2–0	Borac Čačak	Belgrade
18:00	Ilić 21'; Lazevski 81'	Report		Stadium: Partizan Stadium; Attendance: 7,239; Referee: Miodrag Gogić

10 April 2011 21	Spartak Subotica	1–2	Partizan	Subotica
15:30	Mirić 53'	Report	Petrović 68' (pen.); Tomić 90+4'	Stadium: Subotica City Stadium; Attendance: 7,000; Referee: Milorad Mažić

16 April 2011 22	Partizan	0–1	Vojvodina	Belgrade
19:30		Report	Oumarou 77'	Stadium: Partizan Stadium; Attendance: 12,559; Referee: Danilo Grujić

20 April 2011 23	Smederevo	1–4	Partizan	Smederevo
16:00	Ćeran 45'	Report	Tagoe 12'; Babović 20'; Iliev 51'; Vukić 78'	Stadium: Smederevo Stadium; Attendance: 6,000; Referee: Srđan Kaurin

23 April 2011 24	Partizan	1–0	Red Star	Belgrade
18:30	Tagoe 63'	Report		Stadium: Partizan Stadium; Attendance: 19,512; Referee: Slobodan Veselinović

30 April 2011 25	Jagodina	0–2	Partizan	Jagodina
15:00		Report	Krstajić 8'; Tagoe 73'	Stadium: Jagodina City Stadium; Attendance: 6,000; Referee: Dejan Santrač

6 May 2011 26	Partizan	4–0	BSK Borča	Belgrade
19:00	Savić 33'; Vukić 51', 61'; Iliev 57'	Report		Stadium: Partizan Stadium; Attendance: 5,500; Referee: Milan Jeremić

15 May 2011 27	Javor Ivanjica	1–1	Partizan	Ivanjica
15:00	Hadžibulić 44'	Report	Babović 8'	Stadium: Ivanjica Stadium; Attendance: 3,000; Referee: Miodrag Gogić

21 May 2011 28	Partizan	4–0	Čukarički	Belgrade
19:00	Miljković 52'; Tagoe 60'; Šćepović 69'; Iliev 88'	Report		Stadium: Partizan Stadium; Attendance: 15,275; Referee: Marko Popović

25 May 2011 29	Metalac	1–1	Partizan	Gornji Milanovac
17:00	Betolngar 73'	Report	Babović 51'	Stadium: Stadion Metalac; Attendance: 3,000; Referee: Vlado Glođović

29 May 2011 30	Sloboda Užice	1–2	Partizan	Užice
17:00	Pejović 89'	Report	Tagoe 19'; Miljković 53'	Stadium: Užice City Stadium; Attendance: 3,000; Referee: Srđan Kaurin

=== Serbian Cup ===
Date	Round	Opponents	Ground	Result	Scorers
6 October 2010	1/16	Mladost Apatin	A	6 – 0	Cléo 25', 47', Šćepović 35', Babović 49', 84', Davidov 80'
27 October 2010	1/8	Proleter Novi Sad	H	3 – 0	Boya 19', Iliev 46', Šćepović 67'
10 November 2010	1/4	Sinđelić Niš	A	4 – 0	Šćepović 18', 89', Ilić 49', Moreira 72'
16 March 2011	1/2	Crvena zvezda	H	2–0	Tagoe 4', 47'
6 April 2011	1/2	Crvena zvezda	A	0 – 1	–

==== Final ====
11 May 2011
20:15

Vojvodina	0–3^{1}	Partizan
Mojsov 63'	Report (in Serbian)	Tagoe 17'; Vukić 72' (pen.)

Stadion FK Crvena Zvezda, Belgrade, Serbia
Attendance: 25.000
Referee: Slobodan Veselinović

Vojvodina	Partizan

FK Vojvodina:
GK	1	(Serbia) Željko Brkić
RB	22	(Serbia) Miroslav Vulićević
CB	6	(Serbia) Branislav Trajković	(yellow card) 83'
CB	5	(North Macedonia) Daniel Mojsov	63' (yellow card) 72'
LB	31	(Serbia) Vladan Pavlović
DM	8	(Montenegro) Janko Tumbasević	(yellow card) 26'
DM	3	(Serbia) Slobodan Medojević	(yellow card) 70'
AM	11	(Serbia) Nikola Lazetić	(yellow card) 8'	(substituted off) 74'
RW	16	(Bosnia and Herzegovina) Miroslav Stevanović		(substituted off) 60'
LW	9	(Serbia) Brana Ilić	(yellow card) 51'
CF	14	(Cameroon) Aboubakar Oumarou
Substitutes:
GK	32	(Serbia) Filip Pajović
DF	15	(Montenegro) Milko Novaković
MF	13	(Serbia) Vuk Mitošević
MF	17	(Georgia (country)) Giorgi Merebashvili		(substituted on) 60'
FW	27	(Serbia) Aleksandar Katai		(substituted on) 74'
FW	21	(Bosnia and Herzegovina) Nemanja Bilbija
FW	18	(Ghana) Yaw Antwi
Manager:
(Serbia) Zoran Milinković

FK Partizan:
GK	88	(Serbia) Vladimir Stojković
RB	2	(Serbia) Aleksandar Miljković
CB	15	(Montenegro) Stefan Savić	(yellow card) 50'
CB	20	(Serbia) Mladen Krstajić
LB	13	(Serbia) Marko Jovanović
DM	4	(Sierra Leone) Medo Kamara
CM	99	(Serbia) Milan Smiljanić		(substituted off) 82'
RW	25	(Serbia) Stefan Babović
LW	7	(Serbia) Nemanja Tomić		(substituted off) 73'
CF	28	(Ghana) Prince Tagoe	17' (yellow card) 19'
CF	77	(Serbia) Ivica Iliev	(yellow card) 2'	(substituted off) 62'
Substitutes:
GK	33	(Serbia) Radiša Ilić
DF	6	(Serbia) Vojislav Stanković
MF	23	(Serbia) Aleksandar Davidov
MF	8	(Serbia) Radosav Petrović		(substituted on) 82'
MF	22	(Serbia) Saša Ilić		(substituted on) 73'
MF	80	(Serbia) Zvonimir Vukić	72' (pen.)	(substituted on) 62'
FW	19	(Serbia) Miloš Bogunović
Manager:
(Serbia) Aleksandar Stanojević

^{1} The match was abandoned in the 83rd minute with Partizan leading 2-1 when Vojvodina walked off to protest the quality of the officiating. Originally, this was declared the final score and the Cup was awarded to Partizan, but on May 16, 2011, after further investigation from Serbian FA concerning the match, the result was officially registered as a 3–0 win to Partizan.

=== UEFA Champions League ===
==== Second qualifying round ====
14 July 2010 QR2 1st leg	Partizan (Serbia)	3–1	(Armenia) Pyunik	Belgrade, Serbia
20:45	Tomić 29'; Moreira 45+1'; Cléo 59'	Report	Yedigaryan 30'	Stadium: Stadion Partizana; Attendance: 11,134; Referee: Tommy Skjerven (Norway)

21 July 2010 QR2 2nd leg	Pyunik (Armenia)	0–1 (1–4 agg.)	(Serbia) Partizan	Yerevan, Armenia
17:00		Report	Cléo 45+4'	Stadium: Hanrapetakan Stadium; Attendance: 4,500; Referee: Marcin Borski (Poland)

==== Third qualifying round ====
28 July 2010 QR3 1st leg	Partizan (Serbia)	3–0	(Finland) HJK	Belgrade, Serbia
20:45	Iliev 8'; S. Ilić 42'; Cléo 90+2'	Report		Stadium: Stadion Partizana; Attendance: 14,300; Referee: Alon Yefet (Israel)

4 August 2010 QR3 2nd leg	HJK (Finland)	1–2 (1–5 agg.)	(Serbia) Partizan	Helsinki, Finland
18:00	Kamara 39'	Report	Cléo 9', 90+2'	Stadium: Finnair Stadium; Attendance: 4,230; Referee: Pavel Kralovec (Czech Republic)

==== Play-off round ====
18 August 2010 Play-off round 1st leg	Partizan (Serbia)	2–2	(Belgium) Anderlecht	Belgrade, Serbia
20:45	Cléo 57'; Lecjaks 64' (o.g.)	Report	Gillet 54'; Juhász 66'	Stadium: Stadion Partizana; Attendance: 28,565; Referee: Claus Bo Larsen (Denmark)

26 August 2010 Play-off round 2nd leg	Anderlecht (Belgium)	2–2 (a.e.t.) (4–4 agg.) (2–3 p)	(Serbia) Partizan	Brussels, Belgium
20:45	Lukaku 64'; Gillet 71'	Report	Cléo 15', 53'	Stadium: Constant Vanden Stock Stadium; Attendance: 19,551; Referee: Craig Thomson (Scotland)
	Penalties
	Suárez (penalty missed); Biglia (penalty missed); Gillet (penalty scored); Legear (penalty scored); Boussoufa (penalty missed)		(penalty scored) Cléo; (penalty missed) Krstajić; (penalty scored) Petrović; (penalty missed) Davidov; (penalty scored) Stanković

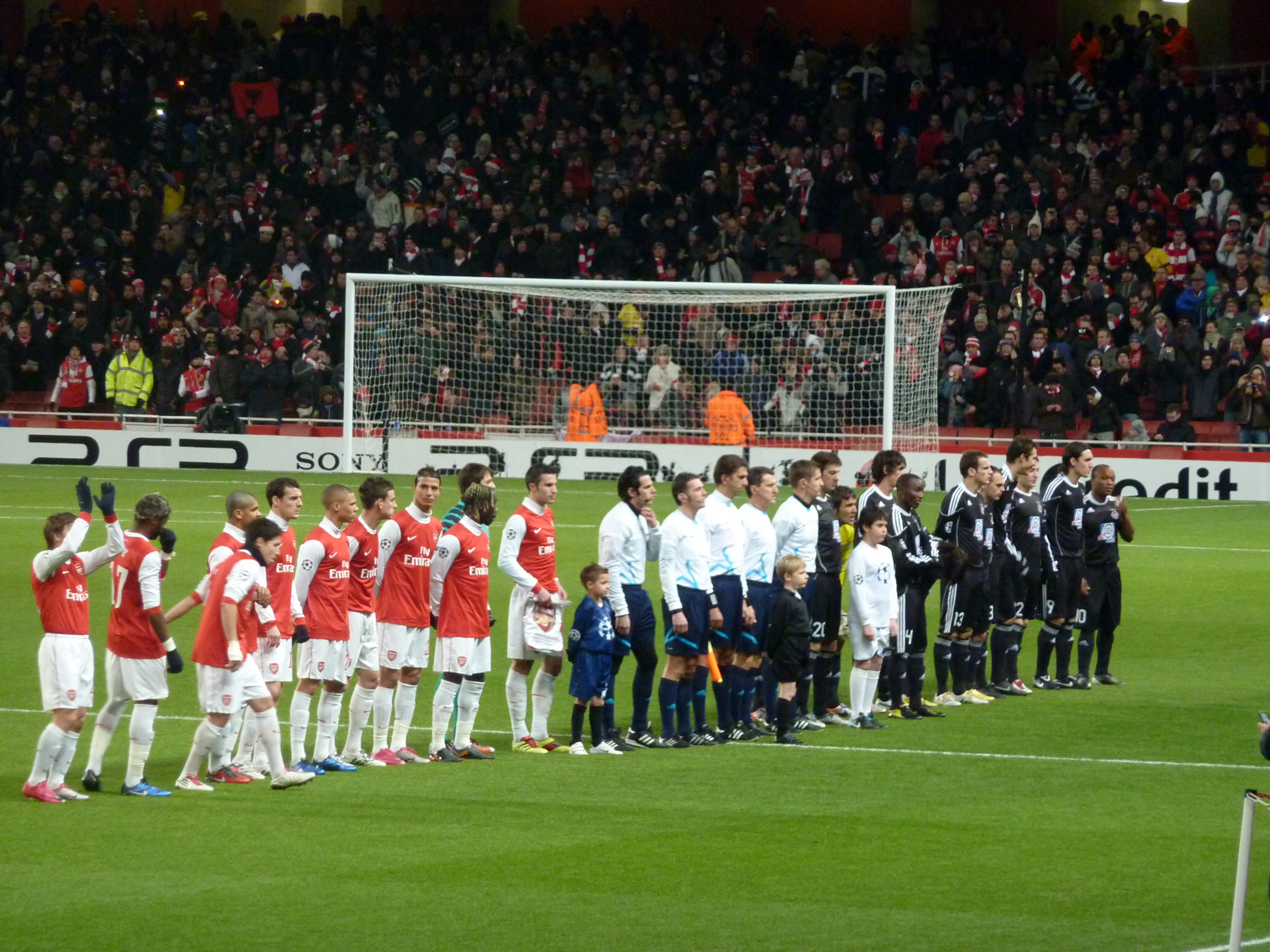
Arsenal – Partizan

==== Group stage ====
Pos	Team	Pld	W	D	L	GF	GA	GD	Pts	Qualification
1	(Ukraine) Shakhtar Donetsk	6	5	0	1	12	6	+6	15	Advance to knockout phase
2	(England) Arsenal	6	4	0	2	18	7	+11	12	Advance to knockout phase
3	(Portugal) Braga	6	3	0	3	5	11	−6	9	Transfer to Europa League
4	(Serbia) Partizan	6	0	0	6	2	13	−11	0	

Source: Soccerway

15 September 2010 1	Shakhtar Donetsk (Ukraine)	1–0	(Serbia) Partizan	Donetsk, Ukraine
20:45	Srna 71'	Report		Stadium: Donbas Arena; Attendance: 48,512; Referee: Carlos Velasco Carballo (Spain)

28 September 2010 2	Partizan (Serbia)	1–3	(England) Arsenal	Belgrade, Serbia
20:45	Cléo 33' (pen.) (penalty missed) 84'	Report	Arshavin 15' (penalty missed) 56'; Chamakh 71'; Squillaci 82'	Stadium: Stadion Partizana; Attendance: 29,348; Referee: Wolfgang Stark (Germany)

19 October 2010 3	Braga (Portugal)	2–0	(Serbia) Partizan	Braga, Portugal
20:45	Lima 35'; Matheus 90'	Report		Stadium: Estádio Municipal de Braga; Attendance: 11,454; Referee: Laurent Duhamel (France)

3 November 2010 4	Partizan (Serbia)	0–1	(Portugal) Braga	Belgrade, Serbia
20:45		Report	Moisés 35'	Stadium: Stadion Partizana; Attendance: 28,295; Referee: Martin Hansson (Sweden)

23 November 2010 5	Partizan (Serbia)	0–3	(Ukraine) Shakhtar Donetsk	Belgrade, Serbia
20:45		Report	Stepanenko 52'; Jádson 59'; Eduardo 68'	Stadium: Stadion Partizana; Attendance: 17,473; Referee: Frank De Bleeckere (Belgium)

8 December 2010 6	Arsenal (England)	3–1	(Serbia) Partizan	London, England
20:45	Van Persie 30' (pen.); Walcott 73'; Nasri 77'	Report	Cléo 52'	Stadium: Emirates Stadium; Attendance: 58,845; Referee: Paolo Tagliavento (Italy)

=== Friendlies ===
Date	Opponents	Ground	Result	Scorers
30 January 2011	(Romania) Rapid București	N	0–0	
2 February 2011	(Canada) Toronto	N	1–1	Tomić 41' (pen.)
4 February 2011	(Austria) Sturm Graz	N	2–1	Tagoe 17', Kuszko 67'
6 February 2011	(Montenegro) Rudar Pljevlja	N	1–1	Šćepović 32'
6 February 2011	(Bulgaria) Slavia Sofia	N	0–0	
14 February 2011	(United Arab Emirates) Al Jazira	A	4–2	Adiyiah 51', Tagoe 54', Vukić 57', Šćepović 90'
17 February 2011	(United Arab Emirates) UAE Border Security Headquarter FC	A	15–0	Iliev 14', Ilić 17', Babović 23', 41', Tagoe 27', 35', Adiyiah 48', 62', Tomić 54', 67', Brašanac 58', Šćepović 61', 76', Smiljanić 68', Petrović 78'
22 February 2011	Srem	H	1–1	Tagoe 21'
26 February 2011	(China) Shaanxi Zhongjian Chanba	N	1–2	Tagoe 44'
1 March 2011	(Slovenia) Koper	A	4–3	Krstajić 20', Brašanac 75', Šćepović 79', Adiyiah 90' (pen.)
26 March 2011	OFK Beograd	H	2–1	Iliev 45', Ljujić 75'

== Transfers ==
=== In ===
Date	Position	Name	From	Type
19 June 2010	DF	(Serbia) Ivan Stevanović	(France) Sochaux	Loan
22 June 2010	GK	(Serbia) Radiša Ilić	(Serbia) Borac Čačak	Transfer
24 June 2010	DF	(Serbia) Matija Nastasić	(Serbia) Teleoptik	Transfer
24 June 2010	FW	(Serbia) Marko Šćepović	(Serbia) Teleoptik	Transfer
2 July 2010	DF	(Uganda) Joseph Kizito	(Serbia) Vojvodina	Transfer
21 July 2010	FW	(Serbia) Ivica Iliev	(Israel) Maccabi Tel Aviv	Transfer
23 July 2010	MF	(Serbia) Milan Smiljanić	(Spain) Espanyol	Loan
16 August 2010	MF	(Serbia) Stefan Babović	(France) Nantes	Transfer
27 August 2010	GK	(Serbia) Vladimir Stojković	(Portugal) Sporting CP	Loan
29 August 2010	DF	(Montenegro) Stefan Savić	(Serbia) BSK Borča	Transfer
31 August 2010	MF	(Sierra Leone) Medo	(Finland) HJK	Transfer
31 August 2010	FW	(Cameroon) Pierre Boya	(France) Grenoble	Transfer
31 January 2011	MF	(Serbia) Zvonimir Vukić	Free agent	Sign
31 January 2011	FW	(Ghana) Prince Tagoe	(Germany) Hoffenheim	Loan
1 February 2011	FW	(Ghana) Dominic Adiyiah	(Italy) Milan	Loan

=== Out ===
Date	Position	Name	To	Type
28 May 2010	DF	(Serbia) Srđa Knežević	(Poland) Legia Warszawa	Transfer
2 June 2010	GK	(Montenegro) Mladen Božović	(Hungary) Videoton	Transfer
24 June 2010	MF	(Slovenia) Danijel Marčeta	(Slovenia) Koper	Transfer
27 June 2010	FW	(Senegal) Lamine Diarra	(United Arab Emirates) Al Shabab	Loan
1 July 2010	FW	(Serbia) Brana Ilić	(Serbia) Vojvodina	Transfer
3 July 2010	DF	(Serbia) Marko Lomić	(Russia) Dynamo Moscow	Transfer
12 July 2010	DF	(Serbia) Siniša Stevanović	(Serbia) Spartak Subotica	Transfer
13 August 2010	DF	(Serbia) Radenko Kamberović	(Serbia) Borac Čačak	Loan
13 August 2010	FW	(Brazil) Washington	(Serbia) Borac Čačak	Loan
31 August 2010	GK	(Serbia) Aleksandar Radosavljević	(Hungary) Győr	Transfer
31 August 2010	MF	(Serbia) Branislav Jovanović	(Serbia) Rad	Transfer
January 2011	DF	(Serbia) Matija Nastasić	(Serbia) Teleoptik	Loan
12 February 2011	FW	(Brazil) Cléo	(China) Guangzhou Evergrande	Transfer
3 March 2011	MF	(Serbia) Predrag Mijić	(Russia) Amkar Perm	Transfer
March 2011	MF	(Guinea-Bissau) Almami Moreira	(China) Dalian Aerbin	Transfer

== Sponsors ==
Kit sponsors
- Kit manufacturer: (Germany) Adidas
- General sponsor: (Serbia) EPS
