= 2009–10 FK Partizan season =

Partizan
2009–10 season
- President: Dragan Đurić
- Head coach: Slaviša Jokanović (until 5 September 2009); Goran Stevanović (until 16 April 2010); Aleksandar Stanojević
- Serbian SuperLiga: Winners
- Serbian Cup: Semi-finals
- UEFA Champions League: Third qualifying round
- UEFA Europa League: Group stage (4th)
- Top goalscorer: League: Cléo & Diarra (14 goals); All: Cléo (22 goals)
- Highest home attendance: 24,670 v Crvena zvezda (8 May 2010)
- Lowest home attendance: 0 v OFK Beograd (6 December 2009)

The 2009–10 season was FK Partizan's 4th season in Serbian SuperLiga. This article shows player statistics and all matches (official and friendly) that the club played during the 2009–10 season.

== Tournaments ==
	Competition	Position
(Serbia)	Serbian SuperLiga	Winners
(Serbia)	Serbian Cup	Semi-finals
(European Union)	UEFA Champions League	Third qualifying round
(European Union)	UEFA Europa League	Group stage

== Players ==
=== Squad information ===
Note: Flags indicate national team as defined under FIFA eligibility rules; some limited exceptions apply. Players may hold more than one non-FIFA nationality.

No.	Pos.	Nation	Player
1	GK	MNE	Darko Božović
3	DF	SRB	Vojislav Stanković
5	MF	SRB	Ljubomir Fejsa
6	DF	SRB	Radenko Kamberović
7	MF	SRB	Nemanja Tomić
8	MF	SRB	Radosav Petrović
9	FW	BRA	Cléo
10	MF	GNB	Almami Moreira
11	DF	SRB	Marko Lomić
13	DF	SRB	Marko Jovanović
14	MF	SRB	Darko Brašanac
17	MF	SRB	Predrag Mijić

No.	Pos.	Nation	Player
18	DF	MKD	Aleksandar Lazevski
19	FW	SRB	Brana Ilić
20	DF	SRB	Mladen Krstajić (captain)
21	MF	SRB	Branislav Jovanović
22	MF	SRB	Saša Ilić (vice-captain)
23	MF	SRB	Aleksandar Davidov
24	DF	SRB	Srđa Knežević
25	FW	BRA	Washington
26	FW	SEN	Lamine Diarra
27	GK	MNE	Mladen Božović
30	GK	SRB	Aleksandar Radosavljević
77	MF	MNE	Nikola Vujović

=== Top scorers ===
Includes all competitive matches. The list is sorted by shirt number when total goals are equal.

Position	Nation	Number	Name	League	Cup	Europe	Total
1	(Brazil)	9	Cleo	14	2	6	22
2	(Senegal)	26	Lamine Diarra	14	3	4	21
3	(Serbia)	8	Radosav Petrović	7	1	1	9
4	(Serbia)	19	Brana Ilić	3	0	3	6
4	(Portugal)	10	Almami Moreira	3	1	1	5

=== Squad statistics ===
No.	Pos.	Name	League		Cup		Europe		Total		Discipline	
No.	Pos.	Name	Apps	Goals	Apps	Goals	Apps	Goals	Apps	Goals	Yellow card	Red card
1	GK	(Montenegro) Darko Božović	0	0	0	0	0	0	0	0	0	0
3	DF	(Serbia) Vojislav Stanković	10	0	1	0	0	0	11	0	1	0
5	MF	(Serbia) Ljubomir Fejsa	20	2	3	0	9	0	32	2	6	0
6	DF	(Serbia) Radenko Kamberović	3	0	0	0	0	0	3	0	0	0
7	MF	(Serbia) Nemanja Tomić	29	2	4	0	12	0	45	2	5	0
8	MF	(Serbia) Radosav Petrović	24	7	2	1	10	1	36	9	12	0
9	FW	(Brazil) Cléo	27	14	4	2	9	6	40	22	3	0
10	MF	(Portugal) Almami Moreira	25	3	4	1	11	1	40	5	7	0
11	DF	(Serbia) Marko Lomić	25	3	4	0	4	0	33	3	4	0
13	DF	(Serbia) Marko Jovanović	17	1	2	0	2	0	21	1	3	0
14	MF	(Serbia) Darko Brašanac	3	0	0	0	0	0	3	0	2	0
15	DF	(Serbia) Jovan Krneta	0	0	0	0	0	0	0	0	0	0
17	MF	(Serbia) Predrag Mijić	4	0	1	0	0	0	5	0	0	0
18	DF	(North Macedonia) Aleksandar Lazevski	0	0	1	0	0	0	1	0	0	0
19	FW	(Serbia) Brana Ilić	22	3	2	0	9	3	33	6	2	0
20	DF	(Serbia) Mladen Krstajić	22	2	1	0	9	2	32	4	7	1
21	MF	(Serbia) Branislav Jovanović	13	0	2	0	8	0	23	0	4	0
22	MF	(Serbia) Saša Ilić	14	3	1	0	0	0	15	3	1	0
23	MF	(Serbia) Aleksandar Davidov	15	3	1	0	0	0	16	3	2	0
24	DF	(Serbia) Srđa Knežević	23	0	2	1	9	0	34	1	7	1
25	FW	(Brazil) Washington	7	0	2	0	3	1	12	1	0	0
26	FW	(Senegal) Lamine Diarra	29	14	4	3	10	4	43	21	3	0
27	GK	(Montenegro) Mladen Božović	25	0	2	0	9	0	36	0	2	0
30	GK	(Serbia) Aleksandar Radosavljević	5	0	2	0	3	0	10	0	0	0
77	MF	(Montenegro) Nikola Vujović	3	0	2	0	1	0	6	0	1	0
Players sold or loaned out during the season
2	DF	(Serbia) Siniša Stevanović	11	0	2	0	8	0	21	0	1	0
4	DF	(Serbia) Nenad Đorđević	14	0	2	0	11	2	27	2	7	0
17	FW	(Serbia) Miloš Bogunović	8	0	0	0	8	0	16	0	1	0
22	MF	(Serbia) Adem Ljajić	14	4	2	0	8	2	24	6	6	0
31	DF	(Serbia) Rajko Brežančić	3	0	2	0	2	0	7	0	2	0
33	DF	(Bosnia and Herzegovina) Aleksandar Kosorić	0	0	0	0	0	0	0	0	0	0
37	DF	(Serbia) Ivan Obradović	2	1	0	0	4	0	6	1	1	0
52	DF	(Serbia) Goran Gavrančić	3	0	1	0	9	0	13	0	4	0

== Competitions ==
=== Overview ===
Competition	Record							
Competition	P	W	D	L	GF	GA	GD	Win %
Superliga	30	24	6	0	63	14	+49	80.00
Serbian Cup	4	3	0	1	8	5	+3	75.00
UEFA Europa League	12	5	1	6	22	17	+5	41.67
Total	46	32	7	7	93	36	+57	69.57

=== Serbian SuperLiga ===
==== League table ====
Pos	Team	Pld	W	D	L	GF	GA	GD	Pts	Qualification or relegation
1	Partizan (C)	30	24	6	0	63	14	+49	78	Qualification for Champions League second qualifying round
2	Red Star Belgrade	30	23	2	5	53	17	+36	71	Qualification for Europa League third qualifying round (Note: Red Star Belgrade as 2009–10 Serbian Cup winners have qualified for the third qualifying round of the UEFA Europa League.)
3	OFK Beograd	30	15	5	10	38	33	+5	50	Qualification for Europa League second qualifying round
4	Spartak Zlatibor Voda	30	14	7	9	34	27	+7	49	Qualification for Europa League second qualifying round
5	Vojvodina	30	13	6	11	51	30	+21	45	

Source: SuperLiga
Rules for classification: 1) points; 2) goal difference; 3) number of goals scored.
(C) Champions

==== Matches ====
15 August 2009 1	Partizan	5 – 0	Borac Čačak	Belgrade
20:00	Ljajić 15'; Diarra 48' 73' 90+1'; Cléo 89'	Report		Stadium: Partizan Stadium; Attendance: 4,468; Referee: Milorad Mažić

23 August 2009 2	Javor	1 – 1	Partizan	Ivanjica
17:30	Luković 39'		Obradović 45'	Stadium: Ivanjica Stadium; Attendance: 3,000; Referee: Peđa Dumnić

30 August 2009 3	Partizan	1 – 0	Hajduk Kula	Belgrade
18:30	Đukanović 65' (o.g.)	Report		Stadium: Partizan Stadium; Attendance: 4,845; Referee: Bojan Stojanović

13 September 2009 4	Čukarički	1 – 1	Partizan	Belgrade
16:30	Zavišić 16'	Report	B. Ilić 62'	Stadium: Čukarički Stadium; Attendance: 2,500; Referee: Milan Karadžić

20 September 2009 5	Partizan	1 – 0	Vojvodina	Belgrade
19:00	B. Ilić 76'	Report		Stadium: Partizan Stadium; Attendance: 4,863; Referee: Boško Jovanetić

26 September 2009 6	Partizan	2 – 1	BSK Borča	Belgrade
19:00	Cléo 31' (pen.); Diarra 52'	Report	Babić 24'	Stadium: Partizan Stadium; Attendance: 3,549; Referee: Života Vlajić

4 October 2009 7	Spartak Subotica	1 – 1	Partizan	Subotica
15:00	Mirić 15'	Report	Diarra 35'	Stadium: Subotica City Stadium; Attendance: 8,000; Referee: Danilo Mihajlović

18 October 2009 8	Partizan	3 – 0	Jagodina	Belgrade
17:00	Krstajić 5'; Diarra 44'; Ljajić 45'	Report		Stadium: Partizan Stadium; Attendance: 2,522; Referee: Miodrag Gogić

25 October 2009 9	Rad	2 – 3	Partizan	Belgrade
13:00	Kaluđerović 24' 75'	Report	Cléo 9' 27'; Fejsa 58'	Stadium: King Peter I Stadium; Attendance: 3,000; Referee: Milenko Vukadinović

1 November 2009 10	Partizan	3 – 1	Napredak Kruševac	Belgrade
15:00	Krstajić 48'; Ljajić 50'; Petrović 87'	Report	Antwi 61'	Stadium: Partizan Stadium; Attendance: 2,268; Referee: Srđan Kaurin

8 November 2009 11	Metalac	0 – 2	Partizan	Kragujevac*
13:00		Report	Petrović 18'; Moreira 38'	Stadium: Čika Dača Stadium; Attendance: 4,000; Referee: Vlado Glođović

21 November 2009 12	Partizan	2 – 1	Smederevo	Belgrade
13:00	Diarra 6'; Petrović 74'	Report	Ćeran 77'	Stadium: Partizan Stadium; Attendance: 2,048; Referee: Srđan Kaurin

28 November 2009 13	Red Star	1 – 2	Partizan	Belgrade
16:15	Knežević 43' (o.g.)	Report	Petrović 4'; Cléo 61'	Stadium: Marakana; Attendance: 31,640; Referee: Dragomir Stanković

6 December 2009 14	Partizan	3 – 0	OFK Beograd	Belgrade
15:30	Ljajić 9'; Petrović 54'; Diarra 69'	Report		Stadium: Partizan Stadium; Attendance: 0 Referee: Dejan Dimitrijević

11 December 2009 15	Mladi Radnik	1 – 1	Partizan	Požarevac
13:00	Lazić 64'	Report	Moreira 18'	Stadium: Vašarište Stadium; Attendance: 2,500; Referee: Slobodan Veselinović

27 February 2010 16	Borac Čačak	0 – 3	Partizan	Čačak
13:30		Report	Cléo 4'; Fejsa 40'; Davidov 47'	Stadium: Čačak Stadium; Attendance: 3,000; Referee: Milorad Mažić

7 March 2010 17	Partizan	0 – 0	Javor	Belgrade
15:30		Report		Stadium: Partizan Stadium; Attendance: 4,000; Referee: Dejan Dimitrijević

14 March 2010 18	Hajduk Kula	0 – 2	Partizan	Kula
14:00		Report	Tomić 6', 66'	Stadium: Hajduk Stadium; Attendance: 2,000; Referee: Slobodan Veselinović

20 March 2010 19	Partizan	3 – 0	Čukarički	Belgrade
17:00	Davidov 25'; Cléo 52'; Petrović 89'	Report		Stadium: Partizan Stadium; Attendance: 5,997; Referee: Marko Popović

24 March 2010 20	Vojvodina	1 – 2	Partizan	Novi Sad
15:00	Gjurovski 55'	Report	Cléo 3', 45'	Stadium: Karađorđe Stadium; Attendance: 15,000; Referee: Danilo Mihajlović

27 March 2010 21	BSK Borča	1 – 2	Partizan	Belgrade
15:00	Obrovac 71'	Report	Cléo 6'; Jovanović 90+2'	Stadium: Omladinski Stadium; Attendance: 4,000; Referee: Milan Karadžić

3 April 2010 22	Partizan	2 – 0	Spartak Subotica	Belgrade
18:00	Lomić 48', 72'	Report		Stadium: Partizan Stadium; Attendance: 3,064; Referee: Boško Jovanetić

11 April 2010 23	Jagodina	0 – 0	Partizan	Jagodina
16:00		Report		Stadium: Jagodina City Stadium; Attendance: 6,000; Referee: Dejan Santrač

18 April 2010 24	Partizan	2 – 1	Rad	Belgrade
18:00	Moreira 34'; S. Ilić 48'	Report	Pršo 56'	Stadium: Partizan Stadium; Attendance: 6,570; Referee: Robert Kiš Čepegi

21 April 2010 25	Napredak Kruševac	0 – 1	Partizan	Kruševac
16:30		Report	Diarra 14'	Stadium: Mladost Stadium; Attendance: 7,500; Referee: Vlado Glođović

24 April 2010 26	Partizan	3 – 1	Metalac	Belgrade
19:00	Cléo 14', 23'; Diarra 49'	Report	Pavlović 90+1'	Stadium: Partizan Stadium; Attendance: 6,157; Referee: Igor Paunović

1 May 2010 27	Smederevo	0 – 2	Partizan	Smederevo
17:00		Report	Cléo 51' (pen.); S. Ilić 59'	Stadium: Smederevo Stadium; Attendance: 7,000; Referee: Peđa Dumnić

8 May 2010 28	Partizan	1 – 0	Red Star	Belgrade
18:30	Petrović 72'	Report		Stadium: Partizan Stadium; Attendance: 24,670; Referee: Boško Jovanetić

13 May 2010 29	OFK Beograd	0 – 3	Partizan	Belgrade
17:00		Report	Cléo 9'; B. Ilić 89'; Petrović 90'	Stadium: Omladinski Stadium; Attendance: 5,000; Referee: Svetislav Marušić

16 May 2010 30	Partizan	6 – 0	Mladi Radnik	Belgrade
19:00	Diarra 18', 30' 83'; S. Ilić 27'; Davidov 77'; Lomić 87'	Report		Stadium: Partizan Stadium; Attendance: 10,129; Referee: Majo Vujović

=== Serbian Cup ===
23 September 2009 Round of 32	Partizan	3 – 0	Inđija	Belgrade
19:00	Cléo 45'; Diarra 64'; Moreira 89'	Report		Stadium: Partizan Stadium; Attendance: 2,500

28 October 2009 Round of 16	Proleter Novi Sad	1 – 2	Partizan	Novi Sad
13:00	Kovačević 53'	Report	Diarra 71'; Knežević 84'	Stadium: Stadion Slana Bara; Attendance: 1,100; Referee: Boško Jovanetić

25 November 2009 Quarter-final	Jagodina	1 – 2	Partizan	Jagodina
13:00	Bojović 16'	Report	Diarra 26'; Cléo 49' (pen.)	Stadium: Jagodina City Stadium; Attendance: 4,000

15 April 2010 Semi-final	Partizan	1 – 3	Vojvodina	Belgrade
18:00	Petrović 45'	Report	Mrđa 36' 49'; Gjurovski 59'	Stadium: Partizan Stadium; Attendance: 5,000

=== UEFA Champions League ===
==== Qualifying phase ====
14 July 2009 2nd qualifying round 1st leg	Rhyl (Wales)	0 – 4	(Serbia) Partizan	Rhyl, Wales
20:45		Report	Krstajić 17'; Cléo 18'; Diarra 45+1'; Đorđević 69'	Stadium: Belle Vue; Attendance: 1,726; Referee: César Muñiz Fernández (Spain)

21 July 2009 2nd qualifying round 2nd leg	Partizan (Serbia)	8 – 0 (12 – 0 agg.)	(Wales) Rhyl	Belgrade, Serbia
20:45	Diarra 4'; Cléo 17', 51', 72' (pen.); Đorđević 20'; Ilić 38', 63'; Petrović 66'	Report		Stadium: Partizan Stadium; Attendance: 9,321; Referee: Markus Strömbergsson (Sweden)

29 July 2009 3rd qualifying round 1st leg	APOEL (Cyprus)	2 – 0	(Serbia) Partizan	Nicosia, Cyprus
19:00	Mirosavljević 50'; Żewłakow 85'	Report		Stadium: GSP Stadium; Attendance: 15,882; Referee: Björn Kuipers (Netherlands)

5 August 2009 3rd qualifying round 2nd leg	Partizan (Serbia)	1 – 0 (1 – 2 agg.)	(Cyprus) APOEL	Belgrade, Serbia
20:45	Moreira 3'	Report		Stadium: Partizan Stadium; Attendance: 23,867; Referee: Matteo Trefoloni (Italy)

=== UEFA Europa League ===
==== Play-off round ====
20 August 2009 Play-off Round 1st leg	Partizan (Serbia)	1 – 1	(Slovakia) MŠK Žilina	Belgrade, Serbia
20:15	Cléo 16' (pen.)	Report	Adauto 34' (pen.)	Stadium: Partizan Stadium; Attendance: 14,143; Referee: Levan Paniashvili (Georgia)

27 August 2009 Play-off Round 2nd leg	MŠK Žilina (Slovakia)	0 – 2 (1 – 3 agg.)	(Serbia) Partizan	Žilina, Slovakia
19:30		Report	Diarra 59'; Ilić 65'	Stadium: Stadium Pod Dubňom; Attendance: 10,650; Referee: Nicolai Vollquartz (Denmark)

==== Group stage ====
Pos	Team	Pld	W	D	L	GF	GA	GD	Pts	Qualification
1	(Ukraine) Shakhtar Donetsk	6	4	1	1	14	3	+11	13	Advance to knockout phase
2	(Belgium) Club Brugge	6	3	2	1	10	8	+2	11	Advance to knockout phase
3	(France) Toulouse	6	2	1	3	6	11	−5	7	
4	(Serbia) Partizan	6	1	0	5	6	14	−8	3	

Source: Soccerway

17 September 2009 1	Partizan (Serbia)	2 – 3	(France) Toulouse	Belgrade, Serbia
21:05	Krstajić 23'; Cléo 67'	Report	Sirieix 30', 38'; Devaux 49'	Stadium: Partizan Stadium; Attendance: 13,845; Referee: Selçuk Dereli (Turkey)

1 October 2009 2	Shakhtar Donetsk (Ukraine)	4 – 1	(Serbia) Partizan	Donetsk, Ukraine
19:00	Lomić 24' (o.g.); Luiz Adriano 39'; Jádson 54'; Rakytskiy 67'	Report	Ljajić 86'	Stadium: Donbas Arena; Attendance: 49,480; Referee: William Collum (Scotland)

22 October 2009 3	Club Brugge (Belgium)	2 – 0	(Serbia) Partizan	Bruges, Belgium
19:00	Perišić 4'; Brežančić 58' (o.g.)	Report		Stadium: Jan Breydel Stadium; Attendance: 18,903; Referee: Mike Dean (England)

5 November 2009 4	Partizan (Serbia)	2 – 4	(Belgium) Club Brugge	Belgrade, Serbia
21:05	Ljajić 52'; Washington 66'	Report	Perišić 28'; Kouemaha 36', 57'; Odjidja-Ofoe 74'	Stadium: Partizan Stadium; Attendance: 6,290; Referee: Robert Schörgenhofer (Austria)

3 December 2009 5	Toulouse (France)	1 – 0	(Serbia) Partizan	Toulouse, France
19:00	Braaten 54'	Report		Stadium: Stadium Municipal; Attendance: 11,123; Referee: Kristinn Jakobsson (Iceland)

16 December 2009 6	Partizan (Serbia)	1 – 0	(Ukraine) Shakhtar Donetsk	Belgrade, Serbia
21:05	Diarra 6'	Report		Stadium: Partizan Stadium; Attendance: 6,000; Referee: Michael Weiner (Germany)

== Friendlies ==
Date	Opponents	Ground	Result	Scorers
28 June 2009	(Serbia) FK Jedinstvo Putevi	A	9 – 2	Cléo 3', 38', 47', 50', B. Ilić 11', 57', B. Jovanović 66', Washington 83', Bogunović 90'
7 July 2009	(North Macedonia) Rabotnički	A	2 – 1	R. Petrović 33', Cléo 44'
27 January 2010	(Austria) SV Ried	H	0 – 0	–
4 February 2010	(Bulgaria) PFC Litex Lovech	A	3 – 2	Tomić 41', B. Ilić 61', Saša Ilić 71'
6 February 2010	(Ukraine) FC Dnipro Dnipropetrovsk	H	1 – 1	Cléo 79' (pen.)
16 February 2010	(Italy) Udinese	H	1 – 2	Cléo 42' (pen.)

== Transfers ==
=== In ===
Date	Position	Name	From	Type
15 June 2009	DF	(Serbia) Mladen Krstajić	(Germany) Schalke 04	Transfer
15 June 2009	MF	(Serbia) Branislav Jovanović	(Serbia) Napredak	Transfer
15 June 2009	DF	(Serbia) Siniša Stevanović	(Serbia) Teleoptik	Transfer
19 June 2009	FW	(Brazil) Cléo	(Portugal) Olivais e Moscavide	Transfer
31 August 2009	DF	(Serbia) Marko Lomić	(Germany) Koblenz	Transfer
11 January 2010	DF	(Serbia) Vojislav Stanković	(Serbia) OFK Beograd	Transfer
11 January 2010	MF	(Serbia) Predrag Mijić	(Serbia) Spartak Subotica	Transfer
11 January 2010	MF	(Serbia) Aleksandar Davidov	(Serbia) Hajduk Kula	Transfer
11 January 2010	DF	(Serbia) Radenko Kamberović	(Serbia) Sevojno	Transfer

=== Out ===
Date	Position	Name	To	Type
3 June 2009	MF	(Brazil) Juca	(Spain) Deportivo La Coruña	Transfer
4 July 2009	DF	(Serbia) Ivan Stevanović	(France) Sochaux	Transfer
22 July 2009	MF	(Slovenia) Danijel Marčeta	(Scotland) Falkirk	Loan
28 July 2009	DF	(Serbia) Milovan Sikimić	(France) Strasbourg	Transfer
28 August 2009	DF	(Serbia) Ivan Obradović	(Spain) Zaragoza	Transfer
1 January 2010	DF	(Serbia) Goran Gavrančić	Unattached	Released
4 January 2010	FW	(Serbia) Miloš Bogunović	(Spain) Cádiz	Loan
13 January 2010	MF	(Serbia) Adem Ljajić	(Italy) Fiorentina	Transfer
28 January 2010	DF	(Serbia) Siniša Stevanović	(Serbia) Spartak Subotica	Loan
29 January 2010	DF	(Bosnia and Herzegovina) Aleksandar Kosorić	(Serbia) Rad	Transfer
8 April 2010	DF	(Serbia) Nenad Đorđević	(Russia) Krylia Sovetov	Transfer

== Sponsors ==
Kit sponsors
- Kit manufacturer: (Italy) Kappa
- General sponsor: (Taiwan) MSI

== See also ==
- List of unbeaten football club seasons
