= 2010–11 Serbian SuperLiga =

5th season of Serbian SuperLiga

Jelen SuperLiga
- Season: 2010–11
- Champions: Partizan; 4th SuperLiga title 23rd domestic title
- Relegated: Čukarički; Inđija
- Champions League: Partizan
- Europa League: Red Star; Vojvodina; Rad
- Matches: 240
- Goals: 501 (2.09 per match)
- Top goalscorer: Ivica Iliev, Andrija Kaluđerović (13 goals)
- Biggest home win: Rad 5–0 BSK Borča; Partizan 5–0 Metalac
- Biggest away win: Hajduk 0–4 Partizan
- Highest scoring: Partizan 5–3 Smederevo
- Highest attendance: 31,135 Red Star – Partizan
- Lowest attendance: 100 Čukarički – Javor Ivanjica
- Average attendance: 2,646

The 2010–11 Serbian SuperLiga (known as the Jelen SuperLiga for sponsorship reasons) was the fifth season of the Serbian SuperLiga, the top football league of Serbia established in 2006. It began on 14 August 2010 and ended on 29 May 2011. A total of sixteen teams contested the league.

Partizan successfully defended their title after a 1–1 draw at Metalac Gornji Milanovac with one match left to play. It was their fourth consecutive Serbian title and their 23rd domestic championship.

== Teams ==
Napredak Kruševac and Mladi Radnik were relegated to the 2010–11 Serbian First League after the 2009–10 season for finishing in 15th and 16th place, respectively. Napredak completed a four-year tenure in the league, while Mladi Radnik had to immediately return to the First League.

The relegated teams were replaced by 2009–10 First League champions Inđija and runners-up Sevojno. Inđija made their debut at the highest football league of Serbia.

Soon after their promotion from the First League, Sevojno merged with Užice city rivals Sloboda, who competed in the third-tier Srpska Liga during the 2009–10 season, to form FK Sloboda Point Sevojno. The newly formed club hence were the first side from Užice to compete at the highest level of football in fourteen years.

Location of teams in the 2010–11 Serbian SuperLiga

Team	City	Stadium	Capacity
FK Borac	Čačak	Čačak Stadium	5,000
FK BSK	Belgrade	Stadion Poljana	2,500
FK Čukarički	Belgrade	Čukarički Stadium	7,000
FK Hajduk	Kula	Stadion Hajduk	11,000
FK Inđija	Inđija	Stadion FK Indjija	4,500
FK Jagodina	Jagodina	Stadion FK Jagodina	15,000
FK Javor	Ivanjica	Javor Stadium	5,000
FK Metalac	Gornji Milanovac	Čika Dača Stadium (Kragujevac)	15,100
OFK Beograd	Belgrade	Omladinski Stadium	14,600
FK Partizan	Belgrade	Partizan Stadium	32,710
FK Rad	Belgrade	Stadion Kralj Petar I	6,000
Red Star	Belgrade	Stadion FK Crvena Zvezda	55,538
FK Sloboda	Užice	Stadion FK Sloboda	12,000
FK Smederevo	Smederevo	Smederevo City Stadium	17,200
FK Spartak	Subotica	Subotica City Stadium	13,000
FK Vojvodina	Novi Sad	Karađorđe Stadium	15,204

== League table ==
Pos	Team	Pld	W	D	L	GF	GA	GD	Pts	Qualification or relegation
1	Partizan (C)	30	24	4	2	75	21	+54	76	Qualification for Champions League second qualifying round
2	Red Star Belgrade	30	22	4	4	52	18	+34	70	Qualification for Europa League third qualifying round (Note: Partizan won the 2010–11 Serbian Cup against Vojvodina. Since both teams will achieve a spot for the European competitions via their final placement, the allocation of the 2011–12 UEFA Europa League spots will be based on final league positions, with the fourth-placed team also qualifying for the competition.)
3	Vojvodina	30	20	7	3	44	14	+30	67	Qualification for Europa League second qualifying round
4	Rad	30	14	10	6	38	21	+17	52	Qualification for Europa League first qualifying round
5	Spartak Zlatibor Voda	30	11	10	9	34	27	+7	43	
6	Sloboda Point Sevojno	30	12	7	11	34	35	−1	43	
7	OFK Beograd	30	12	6	12	27	26	+1	42	
8	Javor Ivanjica	30	10	11	9	21	24	−3	41	
9	Borac Čačak	30	8	12	10	22	31	−9	36	
10	Smederevo	30	8	11	11	24	31	−7	35	
11	BSK Borča	30	8	9	13	23	37	−14	33	
12	Jagodina	30	8	8	14	26	33	−7	32	
13	Hajduk Kula	30	7	8	15	25	37	−12	29	
14	Metalac G.M.	30	8	5	17	21	38	−17	29	
15	Inđija (R)	30	7	5	18	29	47	−18	26	Relegation to Serbian First League
16	Čukarički (R)	30	0	5	25	10	65	−55	5	Relegation to Serbian First League

Source: SuperLiga
Rules for classification: 1) points; 2) head-to-head points; 3) head-to-head goal difference; 4) head-to-head goals scored; 5) goal difference; 6) number of goals scored.
(C) Champions; (R) Relegated

== Results ==
Home \ Away	BOR	BSK	ČUK	HAJ	INĐ	JAG	JAV	MET	OFK	PAR	RAD	RSB	SPS	SME	SZV	VOJ
Borac Čačak		1–0	3–0	1–0	0–0	1–1	1–1	1–0	1–1	0–2	0–0	2–0	1–0	0–1	0–0	1–1
BSK Borča	2–0		3–1	0–0	4–0	1–0	1–0	1–0	1–1	0–3	0–1	1–3	0–1	0–0	0–0	0–2
Čukarički	0–1	0–0		1–1	1–2	1–3	0–1	1–2	0–2	2–4	0–3	0–1	1–2	0–1	0–2	0–2
Hajduk Kula	1–1	0–1	1–1		1–3	1–0	2–0	3–1	1–2	0–4	0–1	2–0	1–2	2–0	1–0	0–1
Inđija	2–0	0–0	0–0	1–2		2–0	1–1	1–0	1–2	1–3	1–1	0–1	1–3	2–0	2–1	1–2
Jagodina	1–1	2–0	1–1	3–0	2–0		0–1	0–2	0–0	0–2	1–1	0–2	0–1	1–0	0–1	1–2
Javor Ivanjica	1–1	0–0	2–0	0–0	2–1	0–0		1–0	0–0	1–1	2–1	0–2	1–0	0–0	0–0	0–1
Metalac G.M.	0–0	2–0	1–0	1–1	2–1	1–2	1–3		2–0	1–1	0–0	0–1	3–2	0–3	0–1	0–1
OFK Beograd	2–1	1–0	4–0	1–0	2–1	0–1	0–1	1–0		0–2	0–1	0–0	1–0	2–2	2–0	1–0
Partizan	2–0	4–0	4–0	2–0	2–1	3–0	4–1	5–0	2–1		3–0	1–0	5–2	5–3	0–0	0–1
Rad	3–1	5–0	4–0	1–0	2–0	2–4	0–0	2–0	2–0	2–2		0–1	0–0	1–0	1–1	1–0
Red Star Belgrade	2–0	4–1	4–0	3–1	3–1	2–1	1–0	2–0	1–0	0–1	2–1		5–1	1–0	2–2	2–2
Sloboda Point Sevojno	0–0	2–1	4–0	2–2	1–0	2–0	2–0	0–1	1–0	1–2	0–0	0–3		2–1	0–1	0–0
Smederevo	0–1	1–1	2–0	1–1	2–1	0–0	2–1	1–0	1–0	1–4	0–0	0–0	0–0		0–0	0–0
Spartak Zlatibor Voda	1–2	1–1	2–0	1–0	5–2	3–2	0–0	2–0	3–1	1–2	1–2	1–2	2–2	2–1		0–1
Vojvodina	4–0	2–1	3–0	2–1	2–0	0–0	2–0	1–1	0–0	2–0	2–0	0–2	3–1	4–1	1–0	

Source: SuperLiga
Legend: Blue = home team win; Yellow = draw; Red = away team win.

== Top goalscorers ==
Including matches played on 29 May 2011; Sources: Superliga official website, soccerway.com

Pos	Scorer	Team ^{1}	Goals
1	(Serbia) Ivica Iliev	Partizan	13
1	(Serbia) Andrija Kaluđerović	Red Star	13
3	(Cameroon) Aboubakar Oumarou	Vojvodina	11
4	(Serbia) Radosav Petrović	Partizan	9
4	(Ghana) Prince Tagoe	Partizan	9

Notes

1. Teams for which that player played during 2010–11 season.

== Hat-tricks ==
Player	For	Against	Result	Date
(Serbia) Nemanja Arsenijević	Sloboda Point Sevojno	Čukarički	4-0	13 November 2010
(Serbia) Enver Alivodić	BSK Borča	Inđija	4–0	9 April 2011

== Awards ==
The selection was made among the coaches of all the clubs playing in the SuperLiga.

=== Young Player of the Season ===
The Young Player of the Season was awarded to Slobodan Medojević (Vojvodina).

=== Team of the Season ===

Serbian SuperLiga Team of the Year

Position	Player	Team
GK	(Serbia) Bojan Šaranov	OFK Beograd
DR	(Serbia) Pavle Ninkov	Red Star
DC	(Montenegro) Stefan Savić	Partizan
DC	(North Macedonia) Daniel Mojsov	Vojvodina
DL	(Serbia) Duško Tošić	Red Star
MR	(Serbia) Stefan Babović	Partizan
MC	(Serbia) Radosav Petrović	Partizan
MC	(Serbia) Slobodan Medojević	Vojvodina
ML	(Brazil) Evandro Goebel	Red Star
FW	(Cameroon) Aboubakar Oumarou	Vojvodina
FW	(Serbia) Andrija Kaluđerović	Red Star
FW	(Serbia) Ivica Iliev	Partizan

== Attendance ==
The 2010–11 season saw an average attendance by club:

	Club	Average	Highest	Lowest	Attendance (%)
1	Red Star	13,293	31,135	6,200	25.56%
2	Partizan	7,241	17,000	1,500	22.08%
3	Vojvodina	3,300	12,000	1,000	20.96%
4	Jagodina	2,027	10,000	500	20.27%
5	Smederevo	1,687	7,000	500	10.1%
6	Borac Čačak	1,593	4,000	400	26.55%
7	Spartak Zlatibor Voda	1,567	7,000	200	12.05%
8	Inđija	1,400	4,500	600	31.11%
9	Sloboda Point Sevojno	1,257	5,500	100	10.48%
10	Metalac G.M.	1,230	10,000	150	20.5%
11	Rad	1,081	3,000	300	33.78%
12	Javor Ivanjica	1,020	3,500	300	28.33%
13	OFK Beograd	950	5,000	200	6.79%
14	BSK Borča	629	4,000	84	15.73%
15	HajduK Kula	587	3,000	200	5.34%
16	Čukarički	477	3,000	100	7.95%

== Champion Squad ==
1.	FK Partizan
	Goalkeepers: Vladimir Stojković (26); Radiša Ilić (3); Živko Živković (1); Defenders: Aleksandar Miljković (22/2); Mladen Krstajić (21/1); (Montenegro) Stefan Savić (20/1); Marko Jovanović (18); (Uganda) Joseph Kizito (14); (North Macedonia) Aleksandar Lazevski (13/1); Ivan Stevanović (8); Vojislav Stanković (8). Midfielders: Saša Ilić (25/1); Radosav Petrović (25/9); Nemanja Tomić (23/4); Stefan Babović (22/8); Milan Smiljanić (19/1); (Sierra Leone) Medo Kamara (18); Zvonimir Vukić (13/3); Aleksandar Davidov (13); Darko Brašanac (4); Ljubomir Fejsa (2); Lazar Marković (1). Forwards: Ivica Iliev (27/13); Marko Šćepović (18/6); (Ghana) Prince Tagoe (15/9); Miloš Bogunović (6/1). (Brazil) Cléo (14/8) (league appearances and goals listed in brackets) Manager: Aleksandar Stanojević. On the roster but have not played in a league game: Matija Nastasić. Transferred out during the season: (Brazil) Cléo (14/8, to Guangzhou); (Guinea-Bissau) Almami Moreira (8/4, to Dalian); (Cameroon) Pierre Boya (7/3, released); (Ghana) Dominic Adiyiah (6, removed from team).
