= Marko Jovanović (footballer, born 1988) =

Serbian footballer

Marko Jovanović Марко Јовановић
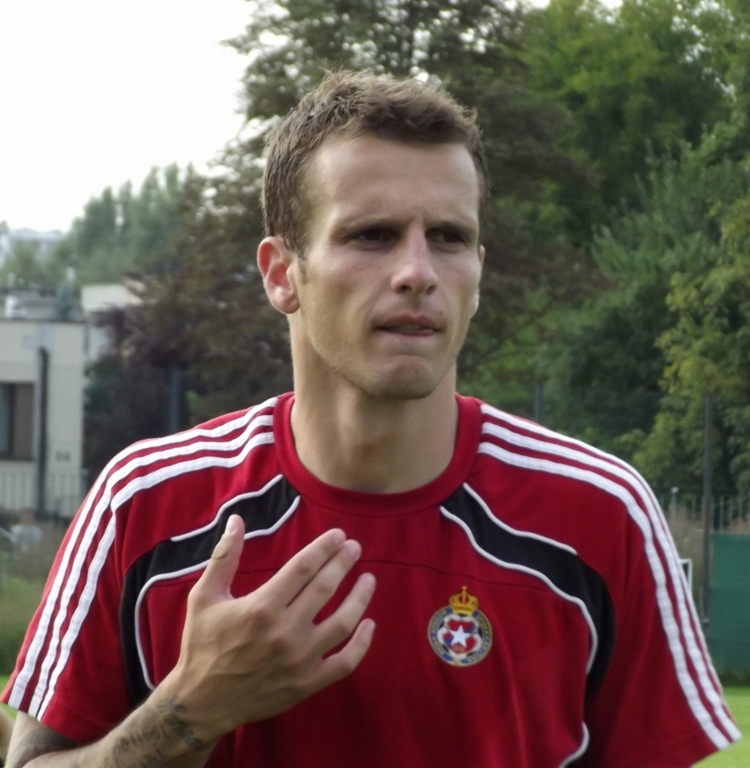
- Jovanović with Wisła Kraków in August 2011

Personal information
- Full name: Marko Jovanović
- Date of birth: 26 March 1988 (age 38)
- Place of birth: Arilje, SFR Yugoslavia
- Height: 1.84 m (6 ft 1/2 in)
- Position: Centre-back

Youth career
- Budućnost Arilje
- 2001–2005: Partizan

Senior career*
Years	Team	Apps	(Gls)
2005–2007	Teleoptik	54	(1)
2007–2011	Partizan	60	(1)
2011–2014	Wisła Kraków	47	(0)
2015	Voždovac	11	(0)
2016	Partizan	12	(0)
2016–2017	Bnei Yehuda	25	(2)
2017–2018	Larissa	11	(0)
2018–2019	Voždovac	31	(1)
2019–2022	Borac Banja Luka	50	(3)
2022	Proleter Novi Sad	8	(1)
2022–2023	Železničar Pančevo	35	(0)

International career
2007–2010	Serbia U21	10	(0)
2008	Serbia Olympic	5	(0)

Managerial career
- 2024–2025: Partizan (assistant)
- 2024: Partizan (caretaker)
- 2025: Partizan (caretaker)
- 2025–: Teleoptik
- * Club domestic league appearances and goals

Marko Jovanović (Serbian Cyrillic: Марко Јовановић; born 26 March 1988) is a Serbian former professional footballer who played as a centre-back.

== Club career ==
=== Partizan ===
Jovanović signed his first professional contract with Partizan on 23 July 2007 alongside Branislav Stanić. Jovanović made his official debut for the club on 26 September 2007 in a Serbian Cup match against Rad in a 4–1 home win. Due to the Summer Olympic Games, Jovanović missed a few matches at the beginning of the 2008–09 season.

==== 2008–09 season ====
On 23 October 2008, he played his first game for Partizan in European competitions against Sampdoria in the first round of the 2008–09 UEFA Cup group stage. He was also a starter against Sevilla on Ramón Sánchez Pizjuán Stadium in the defeat of his team's 3–0. During the 2008–09 season, Jovanović has played 19 appearances for Partizan, 16 in the league and 3 in the UEFA Cup.

==== 2009–10 season ====
In the 2009–10 season, Jovanović was a first starter in the UEFA Europa League group stage against Toulouse on 3 December 2009. He was also a starter against Shakhtar Donetsk in the last match of the group stage of the Europa League in a win of his team of 1–0. On 27 March 2010, Jovanović scored a goal in the last minute of the match against BSK Borča in the victory of his team of 1–2. During the second part of the 2009–10 season, Jovanović was scouted by Monaco. In the second half of the 2009–10 Serbian SuperLiga season, he spent every minute on the field in Partizan.

==== 2010–11 season ====
On 24 August 2010, Jovanović and his team entered at the group stage of the UEFA Champions League by beating Anderlecht. He played all six matches for Partizan in the qualifying for the Champions League. On 28 September 2010, against Arsenal, Jovanović fouled Marouane Chamakh and received a red card, but Vladimir Stojković saved the penalty. By the end of the 2010–11 season he won the Serbian Cup and the title of national champion.

=== Wisła Kraków ===
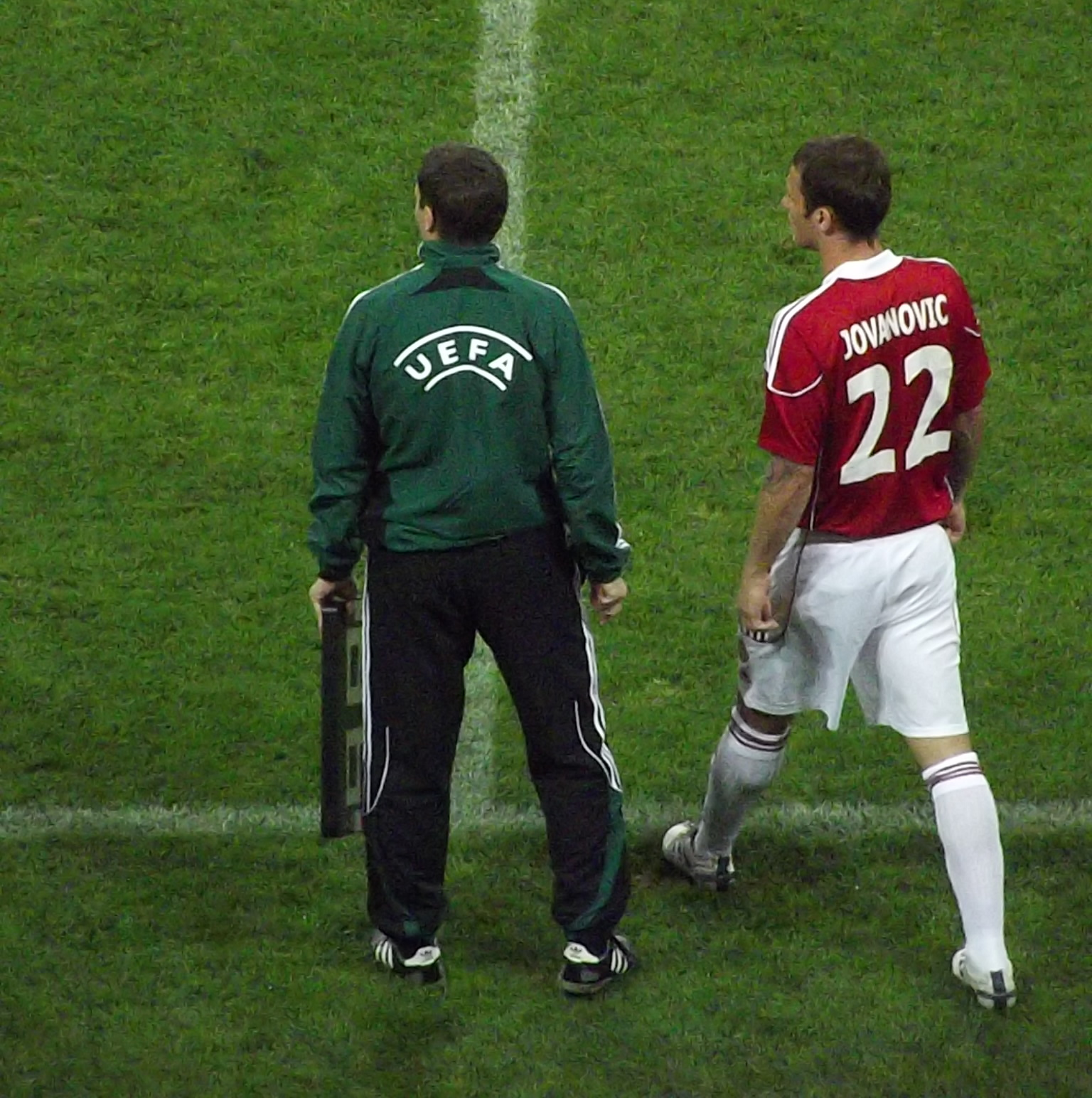
Jovanović entering a match against Litex Lovech in 2011.

On 12 July 2011, Jovanović joined Polish Ekstraklasa champions Wisła Kraków on a five-year deal for an undisclosed fee from Partizan. He made his first league debut for Wisła on 9 September 2011, against Lech Poznań in 0–1 away win. On 3 November 2011, Jovanović made his debut in the Europa League for Wisła against Fulham at Craven Cottage as a substitute for Dudu Biton in the 88th minute. On 14 December 2011, he played a full match against Twente in the 6th leg of the 2011–12 UEFA Europa League group stage. After a dramatic ending, Wisła qualified to the round of 32. In the round of 32, Jovanović played both matches against Standard Liège, but Wisła did not get through because Standard won on away goals. During the 2011–12 season, he played 27 matches in all competitions.

On 24 January 2015, Jovanović was released from the club.

=== Voždovac ===
On 24 August 2015, Jovanović joined Voždovac on a one-year deal. He made his debut for Voždovac on 13 September 2015, against Javor Ivanjica. During the first part of the 2015–16 season, Jovanović played 12 matches in all competitions.

=== Return to Partizan ===
On 23 December 2015, Jovanović signed a two-and-a-half-year contract with Partizan, returning to his former team. On 21 February 2016, Jovanović made his league debut against OFK Beograd. On 11 May 2016, he scored a goal in the 2015–16 Serbian Cup final against Javor Ivanjica in a 2–0 win.

=== AEL ===
On 24 August 2017, Jovanović signed a two-year contract with Super League Greece club AEL for an undisclosed fee. He left AEL after one season in June 2018.

=== Return to Voždovac ===
In the 2018–19 Serbian SuperLiga season, Jovanović returned to and played for Voždovac. He was a regular for the club in that season, playing 30 league games and scoring 1 league goal.

=== Borac Banja Luka ===
On 30 June 2019, Jovanović signed a one-year contract with Bosnian Premier League club Borac Banja Luka. He made his official debut for Borac on 20 July 2019, in a 0–0 away league draw against Željezničar. He scored his first goal for Borac in a 3–1 home league win against Velež Mostar on 29 September 2019. On 29 November 2019, Jovanović extended his contract with Borac until the June 2023. He won his first trophy with the club on 23 May 2021, getting crowned Bosnian Premier League champions one game before the end of the 2020–21 season.

== International career ==
Jovanović made his international debut for the Serbia under-21 national team in a friendly match against Moldova on 21 August 2007.

He was included in the Serbian squad for the 2008 Beijing Olympic Games playing in all three group matches against Australia, Ivory Coast and Argentina before the team finished fourth in their respective group.

He was also a member of the Serbia U21 team that took part in the 2009 UEFA European Under-21 Championship in Sweden.

== Career statistics ==
As of match played 22 January 2024.

Club	Season	League	League		Cup		Continental		Other		Total	
Club	Season	League	Apps	Goals	Apps	Goals	Apps	Goals	Apps	Goals	Apps	Goals
Teleoptik	2005–06	Serbian League Belgrade	28	0	0	0	—		—		28	0
Teleoptik	2006–07	Serbian League Belgrade	26	1	0	0	—		—		26	1
Teleoptik	Total		54	1	0	0	—		—		54	1
Partizan	2007–08	Serbian SuperLiga	9	0	3	0	0	0	—		12	0
Partizan	2008–09	Serbian SuperLiga	16	0	3	0	3	0	—		22	0
Partizan	2009–10	Serbian SuperLiga	17	1	2	0	2	0	—		21	1
Partizan	2010–11	Serbian SuperLiga	18	0	4	0	10	0	—		32	0
Partizan	Total		60	1	12	0	15	0	—		87	1
Wisła Kraków	2011–12	Ekstraklasa	14	0	2	0	10	0	—		26	0
Wisła Kraków	2012–13	Ekstraklasa	16	0	5	0	0	0	—		21	0
Wisła Kraków	2013–14	Ekstraklasa	17	0	2	0	0	0	—		19	0
Wisła Kraków	2014–15	Ekstraklasa	0	0	0	0	0	0	—		0	0
Wisła Kraków	Total		47	0	9	0	10	0	—		66	0
Voždovac	2015–16	Serbian SuperLiga	11	0	1	0	0	0	—		12	0
Partizan	2015–16	Serbian SuperLiga	12	0	4	1	0	0	—		16	1
Bnei Yehuda	2016–17	Israeli Premier League	25	2	3	0	0	0	1 (Note: One appearance in Toto Cup)	0	29	2
AEL	2017–18	Super League Greece	11	0	6	0	—		—		17	0
Voždovac	2018–19	Serbian SuperLiga	30	1	1	0	—		—		32	1
Borac Banja Luka	2019–20	Bosnian Premier League	20	2	1	0	—		—		21	2
Borac Banja Luka	2020–21	Bosnian Premier League	17	0	0	0	0	0	—		17	0
Borac Banja Luka	2021–22	Bosnian Premier League	13	1	0	0	4	0	—		17	1
Borac Banja Luka	Total		50	3	1	0	4	0	—		55	3
Železničar Pančevo	2022–23	Serbian First League	26	0	0	0	—		—		26	0
Železničar Pančevo	2023–24	Serbian SuperLiga	9	0	0	0	—		—		9	0
Železničar Pančevo	Total		35	0	0	0	0	0	—		35	0
Career Total			335	8	37	1	29	0	1	0	403	9

== Managerial statistics ==
As of 13 November 2025

Managerial record by team and tenure
Team	From	To	Record				
Team	From	To	G	W	D	L	Win %
Partizan (caretaker)	2 December 2024	31 December 2024	5	3	1	1	60.00
Partizan (caretaker)	3 November 2025	11 November 2025	2	2	0	0	100.00
Career total			7	5	1	1	71.43

== Honours ==
Partizan

- Serbian SuperLiga: 2007–08, 2008–09, 2009–10, 2010–11
- Serbian Cup: 2007–08, 2008–09, 2010–11, 2015–16

Bnei Yehuda

- Israel State Cup: 2016–17

Borac Banja Luka

- Bosnian Premier League: 2020–21
