= Aleksandar Davidov =

Serbian professional footballer

Aleksandar Davidov Александар Давидов
Personal information
- Full name: Aleksandar Davidov
- Date of birth: 7 October 1983 (age 43)
- Place of birth: Novi Sad, SFR Yugoslavia
- Height: 1.73 m (5 ft 8 in)
- Position: Winger

Youth career
- 1991–1998: Omladinac Deronje
- 1998–2000: Hajduk Kula

Senior career*
| Years | Team | Apps | (Gls) |
| 2000–2009 | Hajduk Kula | 161 | (18) |
| 2003–2004 | → Tekstilac Odžaci (loan) | 7 | (2) |
| 2010–2012 | Partizan | 29 | (3) |
| 2011–2012 | → Hapoel Acre (loan) | 32 | (2) |
| 2012–2013 | Bnei Sakhnin | 22 | (2) |
| 2013–2015 | Ashdod | 59 | (9) |
| 2016 | Agrotikos Asteras | 10 | (0) |
| 2016–2017 | ČSK Čelarevo | 14 | (2) |
| 2017–2018 | TSC | 22 | (0) |
| 2018–2021 | Hajduk 1912 | 48 | (6) |
| Total | | 404 | (44) |

International career
| 2003–2004 | Serbia and Montenegro U21 | 5 | (0) |
| 2010 | Serbia | 1 | (0) |
- * Club domestic league appearances and goals

Aleksandar Davidov (Serbian Cyrillic: Александар Давидов; born 7 October 1983) is a Serbian retired footballer who played as a winger.

== Club career ==
Davidov started out at Hajduk Kula, making his senior debut in 2000. He spent the following 10 years at the club, before transferring to Partizan in the 2009–10 winter transfer window. Until the end of the season, Davidov appeared in all of his team's 15 league games and scored three goals, thus helping them win their third consecutive title. He subsequently made his UEFA Champions League debut in the 2010–11 campaign, coming on as a substitute for Almami Moreira in a 0–3 home loss to Shakhtar Donetsk. In September 2011, Davidov was loaned to Israeli club Hapoel Acre until the end of the season.

== International career ==
Davidov earned one cap for Serbia, coming on as a substitute for Dušan Tadić in a 3–0 away friendly win over Japan in April 2010.

== Statistics ==
| Club | Season | League | | Cup | | Continental | | Total | |
| Club | Season | Apps | Goals | Apps | Goals | Apps | Goals | Apps | Goals |
|---|---|---|---|---|---|---|---|---|---|
| Hajduk Kula | 2000–01 | 7 | 0 | 0 | 0 | — | | 7 | 0 |
| Hajduk Kula | 2001–02 | 1 | 0 | | | — | | 1 | 0 |
| Hajduk Kula | 2002–03 | 11 | 3 | | | — | | 11 | 3 |
| Hajduk Kula | 2003–04 | 27 | 2 | | | — | | 27 | 2 |
| Hajduk Kula | 2004–05 | 21 | 2 | | | — | | 21 | 2 |
| Hajduk Kula | 2005–06 | 28 | 4 | | | — | | 28 | 4 |
| Hajduk Kula | 2006–07 | 29 | 5 | | | 2 | 0 | 31 | 5 |
| Hajduk Kula | 2007–08 | 6 | 0 | | | 1 | 0 | 7 | 0 |
| Hajduk Kula | 2008–09 | 18 | 0 | 0 | 0 | — | | 18 | 0 |
| Hajduk Kula | 2009–10 | 13 | 2 | | | — | | 13 | 2 |
| Hajduk Kula | Total | 161 | 18 | 0 | 0 | 3 | 0 | 164 | 18 |
| Partizan | 2009–10 | 15 | 3 | 1 | 0 | 0 | 0 | 16 | 3 |
| Partizan | 2010–11 | 13 | 0 | 3 | 1 | 8 | 0 | 24 | 1 |
| Partizan | 2011–12 | 1 | 0 | 0 | 0 | 0 | 0 | 1 | 0 |
| Partizan | Total | 29 | 3 | 4 | 1 | 8 | 0 | 41 | 4 |
| Hapoel Acre (loan) | 2011–12 | 32 | 2 | 0 | 0 | — | | 32 | 2 |
| Bnei Sakhnin | 2012–13 | 22 | 2 | 1 | 0 | — | | 23 | 2 |
| Ashdod | 2013–14 | 28 | 5 | 1 | 0 | — | | 29 | 5 |
| Ashdod | 2014–15 | 31 | 4 | 7 | 2 | — | | 38 | 6 |
| Ashdod | Total | 59 | 9 | 8 | 2 | 0 | 0 | 67 | 11 |
| Agrotikos Asteras | 2015–16 | 10 | 0 | 0 | 0 | — | | 10 | 0 |
| ČSK Čelarevo | 2016–17 | 14 | 2 | 0 | 0 | — | | 14 | 2 |
| TSC | 2017–18 | 22 | 0 | 0 | 0 | — | | 22 | 0 |
| Career total | | 349 | 36 | 13 | 1 | 11 | 0 | 373 | 39 |

== Honours ==
Partizan

- Serbian SuperLiga: 2009–10, 2010–11
- Serbian Cup: 2010–11
