= Radiša Ilić =

Serbian footballer (1977–2025)

Personal information
- Date of birth: 20 September 1977
- Place of birth: Bajina Bašta, SR Serbia, Yugoslavia
- Date of death: 13 March 2025 (aged 47)
- Height: 1.92 m (6 ft 4 in)
- Position: Goalkeeper

Senior career*
Years	Team	Apps	(Gls)
1995–1998	Sloboda Užice	44	(0)
1998–2003	Partizan	66	(0)
2004	Național București	1	(0)
2004–2006	Borac Čačak	43	(0)
2006–2008	OFK Beograd	80	(0)
2009	Panserraikos	5	(0)
2010	Borac Čačak	15	(0)
2010–2013	Partizan	5	(0)
Total		259	(0)

International career
2008	Serbia	1	(0)
- * Club domestic league appearances and goals

Radiša Ilić (Serbian Cyrillic: Радиша Илић; 20 September 1977 – 13 March 2025) was a Serbian footballer who played as a goalkeeper.

== Club career ==
After starting out at Sloboda Užice, Ilić was transferred to Partizan in the summer of 1998. He spent the next five seasons at the club, winning three championship titles (1999, 2002, and 2003) and one national cup (2001).

Following a brief spell with Romanian club Național București, Ilić returned to his homeland and represented Borac Čačak (2004–2006) and OFK Beograd (2006–2008). He subsequently moved abroad for the second time and joined Greek side Panserraikos, failing to help them avoid relegation from the top flight in the 2008–09 season.

In June 2010, Ilić rejoined Partizan after seven years. He collected three more domestic trophies with the Crno-beli, before retiring from the game in the 2013 winter transfer window.

== International career ==
Ilić recorded his only cap for Serbia in a 1–1 friendly draw against Macedonia on 6 February 2008, keeping a clean sheet in the first half before being substituted for Damir Kahriman.

== Death ==
Ilić committed suicide on 13 March 2025, at the age of 47.

== Honours ==
Partizan

- Serbian SuperLiga: 1998–99, 2001–02, 2002–03, 2010–11, 2011–12
- Serbian Cup: 2000–01, 2010–11
