= Srđa Knežević =

Serbian footballer

Srđa Knežević Срђан Кнежевић
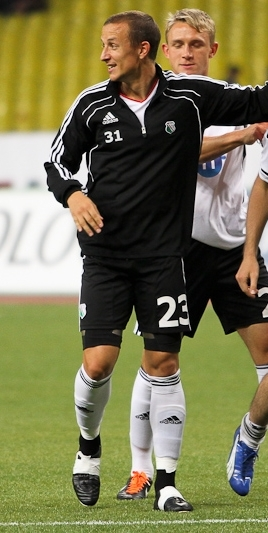
- Knežević with Legia Warsaw in 2011

Personal information
- Full name: Srđa Knežević
- Date of birth: 15 April 1985 (age 41)
- Place of birth: Belgrade, SFR Yugoslavia
- Height: 1.80 m (5 ft 11 in)
- Position: Defender

Youth career
- Partizan

Senior career*
Years	Team	Apps	(Gls)
2003–2010	Partizan	57	(1)
2003–2005	→ Teleoptik (loan)	38	(0)
2005–2006	→ Obilić (loan)	21	(2)
2006–2007	→ Bežanija (loan)	20	(1)
2010–2012	Legia Warsaw	4	(0)
2012	→ Borac Banja Luka (loan)	8	(1)
2013	Hapoel Acre	9	(0)
2014	Rad	11	(0)
2014	V-Varen Nagasaki	0	(0)
2015	OFK Beograd	8	(0)
2016	Agrotikos Asteras	3	(0)
2017	Novi Pazar	11	(0)
2017–2019	Žarkovo	47	(3)
Total		237	(8)

International career
2002	FR Yugoslavia U17	6	(0)
2003	Serbia and Montenegro U19	3	(0)

Managerial career
- 2019–2020: Jedinstvo Ub
- 2021: Prva Iskra Baric
- 2022–2023: BSK 1926 Bacevac
- 2023: Mihajlovac
- * Club domestic league appearances and goals

Srđan "Srđa" Knežević (Serbian Cyrillic: Срђан Срђа Кнежевић; born 15 April 1985) is a Serbian football manager and former player who played as a defender.

== Club career ==
Knežević came through the youth system of Partizan. He later went on loans to Teleoptik, Obilić and Bežanija in order to gain experience. In the summer of 2007, Knežević returned to Partizan, helping the club win three consecutive national championships (2008, 2009 and 2010). He subsequently moved to Polish club Legia Warsaw in May 2010.

In July 2014, Knežević joined Japanese club V-Varen Nagasaki.

== International career ==
Knežević represented FR Yugoslavia at the 2002 UEFA European Under-17 Championship.

== Honours ==
Partizan

- Serbian SuperLiga: 2007–08, 2008–09, 2009–10
- Serbian Cup: 2007–08, 2008–09

Legia Warsaw

- Polish Cup: 2010–11
