= Branislav Jovanović =

Serbian footballer (born 1985)

Branislav Jovanović Бранислав Јовановић
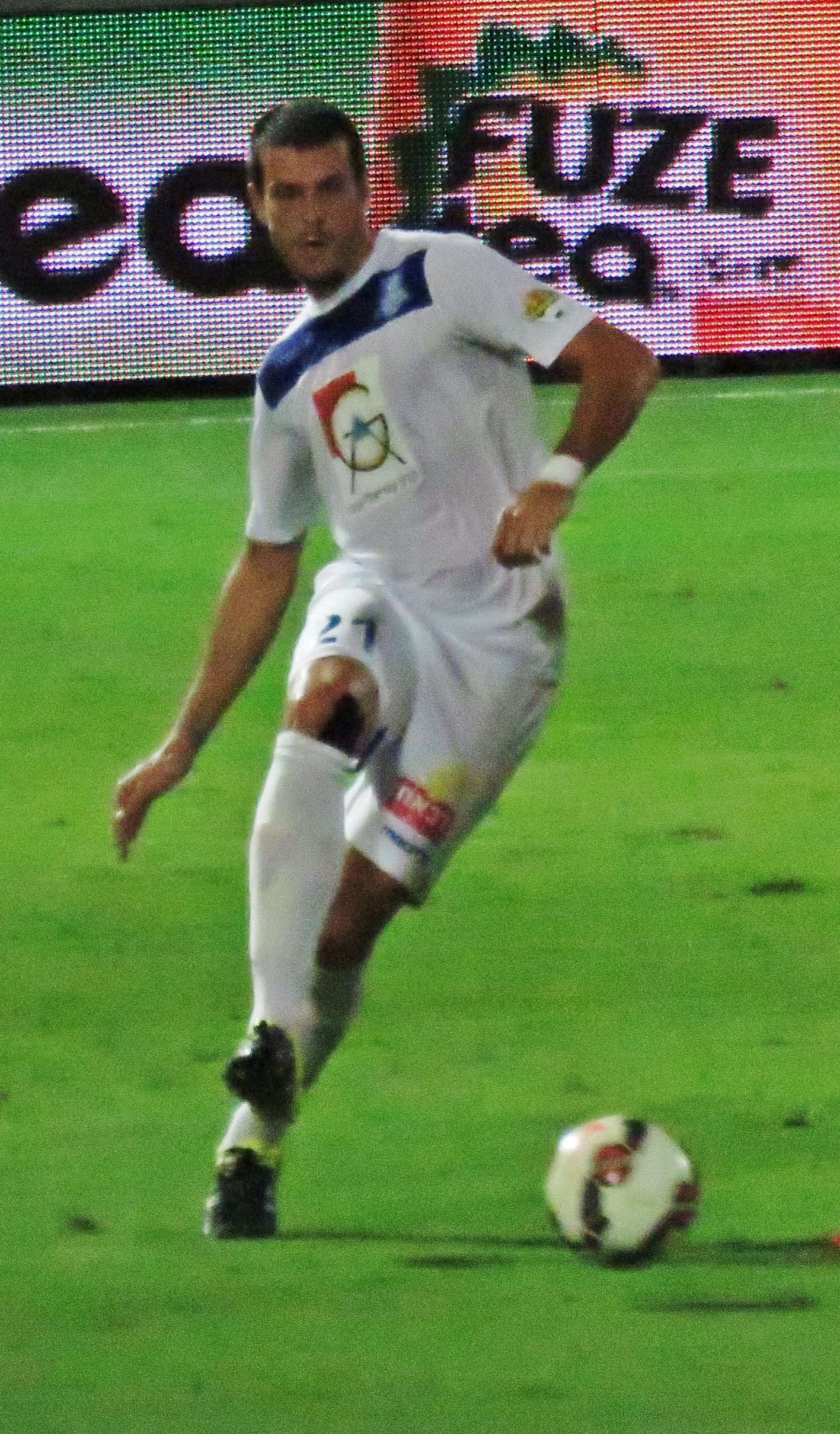
- Jovanović with Hapoel Acre in 2015

Personal information
- Date of birth: 21 September 1985 (age 41)
- Place of birth: Belgrade, SFR Yugoslavia
- Height: 1.90 m (6 ft 3 in)
- Position: Defensive midfielder

Senior career*
Years	Team	Apps	(Gls)
2003–2004	Jedinstvo Surčin	13	(1)
2005–2006	Beograd	32	(10)
2006–2008	Ethnikos Achna	22	(0)
2009	Napredak Kruševac	13	(5)
2009–2010	Partizan	13	(0)
2010–2012	Rad	47	(5)
2013–2016	Hapoel Acre	97	(5)
2016	Voždovac	16	(0)
2017–2018	Hapoel Ashkelon	41	(3)
2018	Hapoel Ramat Gan	14	(1)
2019	Rad	18	(1)
2019–2022	Proleter Novi Sad	67	(3)
2022–2023	Novi Sad 1921	13	(2)
2023	Zvezdara	11	(0)

International career
2011	Serbia	1	(0)
- * Club domestic league appearances and goals as of 20 May 2024

Branislav Jovanović (Serbian Cyrillic: Бранислав Јовановић; born 21 September 1985) is a Serbian professional footballer who plays as a defensive midfielder.

== Club career ==
Jovanović made his senior debuts with Jedinstvo Surčin. He also played for Beograd in the Serbian League Belgrade, before moving to Cypriot club Ethnikos Achna. In the 2009 winter transfer window, Jovanović returned to his homeland and signed with Serbian SuperLiga side Napredak Kruševac.

In June 2009, Jovanović signed a four-year contract with Partizan. He helped the side defend the league title in the 2009–10 season. After an unsuccessful negotiation with Turkish side Galatasaray, Jovanović signed for Serbian SuperLiga club Rad on the last day of the 2010 summer transfer window.

In the 2013 winter transfer window, Jovanović moved abroad for the second time and joined Israeli side Hapoel Acre. He spent three and a half years at the club, collecting over 100 appearances across all domestic competitions (Premier League, State Cup and Toto Cup).

In August 2016, Jovanović returned to Serbia and signed with Voždovac. He moved back to Israel six months later and joined Hapoel Ashkelon. After playing for Hapoel Ramat Gan, Jovanović rejoined his former club Rad in early 2019.

== International career ==
On 7 June 2011, Jovanović made his international debut for Serbia, replacing Dejan Stanković as a late substitute in a 0–0 friendly draw against Australia.

== Honours ==
Partizan

- Serbian SuperLiga: 2009–10
