= Goran Gavrančić =

Serbian footballer

Personal information
- Full name: Goran Gavrančić
- Date of birth: 2 August 1978 (age 48)
- Place of birth: Belgrade, SR Serbia, SFR Yugoslavia
- Height: 1.91 m (6 ft 3 in)
- Position: Defender

Youth career
- 1988–1990: Vinča
- 1990–1995: Red Star Belgrade
- 1995–1996: Vinča
- 1996–1997: Čukarički

Senior career*
Years	Team	Apps	(Gls)
1997–2001	Čukarički	57	(1)
2001–2008	Dynamo Kyiv	135	(22)
2001–2002	→ Dynamo-2 Kyiv (loan)	15	(7)
2008	→ PAOK (loan)	7	(0)
2009	Partizan	15	(0)
2010	Henan Construction	3	(0)
Total		232	(30)

International career
2002–2006	Serbia and Montenegro	28	(0)
- * Club domestic league appearances and goals

Goran Gavrančić (Serbian Cyrillic: Горан Гавранчић; born 2 August 1978) is a Serbian retired footballer who played as a defender.

He represented Serbia and Montenegro at the 2006 FIFA World Cup.

== Club career ==
His career began at Čukarički, having played for Red Star Belgrade as a youth. His performances at Čukarički caught the eye of Dynamo Kyiv manager Valeriy Lobanovskyi and the Ukrainian club purchased him in January 2001. In January 2008, he joined on a six-month loan deal with PAOK.

After six months without club, he signed a one-year contract with Partizan on 17 January 2009. He signed for Henan Construction in January 2010. In September 2010, he announced his retirement from professional football due to the prolonged problems with injuries.

== International career ==
Gavrančić was part of the Serbia and Montenegro national team's "Famous Four" defence, alongside Mladen Krstajić, Ivica Dragutinović and Nemanja Vidić, that conceded just one goal during the ten 2006 FIFA World Cup qualification matches, setting a new record for the fewest goals conceded. He earned a total of 28 caps (no goals) and his final international was at that 2006 World Cup Finals tournament against the Ivory Coast.

=== International statistics ===
National team	Year	Apps	Goals
FR Yugoslavia	2002	4	0
Serbia and Montenegro	2003	4	0
Serbia and Montenegro	2004	7	0
Serbia and Montenegro	2005	9	0
Serbia and Montenegro	2006	4	0
Total		28	0

== Honours ==
Dynamo Kyiv

- Ukrainian Premier League: 2000–01, 2002–03, 2003–04, 2006–07
- Ukrainian Cup: 2002–03, 2004–05, 2005–06, 2006–07
- Ukrainian Super Cup: 2004, 2006, 2007

Partizan

- Serbian SuperLiga: 2008–09
- Serbian Cup: 2008–09
