= Milan Lazić =

Serbian footballer

Personal information
- Full name: Milan Lazić
- Date of birth: 27 October 1982 (age 44)
- Place of birth: Požarevac, SFR Yugoslavia
- Height: 1.83 m (6 ft 0 in)
- Position: Defender

Senior career*
Years	Team	Apps	(Gls)
2001–2007	Mladi Radnik	150	(14)
2003	→ INON	2	(0)
2007–2009	Voždovac	52	(5)
2009–2012	Mladi Radnik	60	(5)
2012	Voždovac	3	(0)
Total		267	(24)
- * Club domestic league appearances and goals as of September 30, 2012 ‡ National team caps and goals as of September 30, 2012

Milan Lazić (Serbian Cyrillic: Милан Лазић; born 27 October 1982) is a Serbian retired football defender.
