= Aleksandar Lazevski =

Macedonian footballer

Personal information
- Full name: Aleksandar Lazevski
- Date of birth: 21 January 1988 (age 38)
- Place of birth: Vršac, SFR Yugoslavia
- Height: 1.74 m (5 ft 9 in)
- Position: Left-back

Team information
- Current team: OFK Vršac
- Number: 18

Youth career
- Banat Vršac
- 2000–2005: Partizan

Senior career*
Years	Team	Apps	(Gls)
2005–2007	Teleoptik	40	(1)
2007–2013	Partizan	52	(3)
2009	→ Teleoptik (loan)	20	(0)
2013–2014	Hoverla Uzhhorod	4	(0)
2014	→ Rad (loan)	15	(0)
2015	Olimpija Ljubljana	7	(0)
2015–2016	Mladost Lučani	22	(0)
2016–2018	Sloboda Tuzla	39	(0)
2018–2025	OFK Vršac	162	(0)

International career^{‡}
2007–2010	Macedonia U21	12	(0)
2010–2013	Macedonia	14	(0)
- * Club domestic league appearances and goals as of 26 December 2023 ‡ National team caps and goals as of 7 October 2018

Aleksandar Lazevski (Macedonian: Александар Лазевски; born 21 January 1988) is a professional footballer who plays for OFK Vršac. Born in Serbia, he represented the Macedonian national team.

== Club career ==
Lazevski has passed Partizan's youth academy after which he was transferred to FK Teleoptik to gain experience. Lazevski was promoted to Partizan during the 2007–08 season, where he scored a goal on his debut. Because of injury problems he lost a place in the first team and was transferred to Teleoptik once again. In January 2010, after good performances in Teleoptik, he returned to Partizan. Lazevski won with Partizan four Serbian championship titles, and one Serbian Cup. He also made appearances in the 2009–10 UEFA Europa League group stage and the 2010–11 UEFA Champions League group stage.

== International career ==
On 3 September, in 2010, Lazevski made his international debut for Macedonia in a UEFA Euro 2012 qualifier against Slovakia in Bratislava. He has earned a total of 14 caps. His final international was a September 2013 FIFA World Cup qualification match against Wales.

== Career statistics ==
Club	Season	League		Cup		Continental		Total	
Club	Season	Apps	Goals	Apps	Goals	Apps	Goals	Apps	Goals
Teleoptik	2005–06	16	1			0	0	16	1
Teleoptik	2006–07	22	0			0	0	22	0
Teleoptik	2007–08	2	0			0	0	2	0
Partizan	2007–08	16	2	2	1	0	0	18	3
Partizan	2008–09	0	0	0	0	0	0	0	0
Teleoptik	2008–09	7	0			0	0	7	0
Teleoptik	2009–10	13	0			0	0	13	0
Partizan	2009–10	0	0	1	0	0	0	1	0
Partizan	2010–11	13	1	2	0	11	0	26	1
Partizan	2011–12	8	0	3	0	0	0	11	0
Partizan	2012–13	17	0	0	0	2	0	19	0
Hoverla Uzhhorod	2013–14	4	0	0	0	0	0	4	0
Rad (loan)	2013–14	15	0	0	0	0	0	15	0
Olimpija Ljubljana	2014–15	7	0	0	0	0	0	7	0
Mladost Lučani	2015–16	22	0	1	1	0	0	23	1
Sloboda Tuzla	2016–17	18	0	0	0	0	0	18	0
Sloboda Tuzla	2017–18	21	0	4	0	0	0	25	0
Career total		198	4	12	2	13	0	223	6

== Honours ==
Partizan

- Serbian SuperLiga: 2007–08, 2008–09, 2009–10, 2010–11, 2011–12, 2012–13
- Serbian Cup: 2007–08, 2008–09, 2010–11
