= Marko Lomić =

Serbian footballer

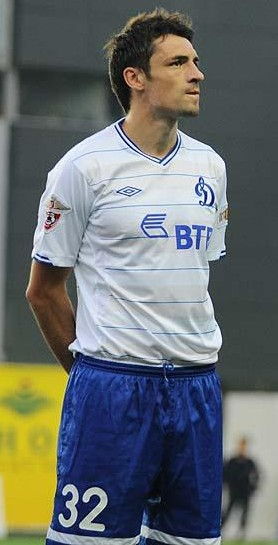
- Lomić with Dynamo Moscow in 2010

Personal information
- Full name: Marko Lomić
- Date of birth: 13 September 1983 (age 43)
- Place of birth: Čačak, SFR Yugoslavia
- Height: 1.87 m (6 ft 2 in)
- Position: Left-back

Senior career*
Years	Team	Apps	(Gls)
2001–2002	Borac Čačak	28	(3)
2002–2005	Železnik	72	(0)
2005–2007	Partizan	50	(3)
2007–2009	TuS Koblenz	53	(0)
2009–2010	Partizan	25	(3)
2010–2014	Dynamo Moscow	95	(1)
2014–2016	Mordovia Saransk	24	(4)
Total		347	(14)

International career
2004–2006	Serbia and Montenegro U21 (Note: Only official UEFA matches included)	14	(1)
2004	Serbia and Montenegro Olympic	3	(0)
2010–2012	Serbia	3	(0)
- * Club domestic league appearances and goals

Marko Lomić (Serbian Cyrillic: Марко Ломић; born 13 September 1983) is a Serbian former professional footballer who played as a left-back.

== Club career ==
Lomić started out at his hometown club Borac Čačak, before transferring to Železnik in the summer of 2002. He spent the following three seasons with the Lavovi, winning the Serbia and Montenegro Cup in 2005.

On 23 June 2005, Lomić signed a four-year contract with Partizan. He was given the number 13 shirt, previously worn by South Korean youth international Kim Chi-woo. Over the next two seasons, Lomić made 50 league appearances and scored three goals for the club. In June 2007, Lomić was transferred to TuS Koblenz, penning a three-year deal.

On 31 August 2009, Lomić rejoined Partizan from TuS Koblenz after the two clubs agreed a transfer. He signed a two-year contract and was given the number 11 shirt. In his comeback season, Lomić made 25 league appearances and scored three goals, thus helping his team win the title, as well as making the competition's best eleven.

On 5 July 2010, Lomić moved to Dynamo Moscow, penning a three-year deal. He made a total of 106 official appearances and scored one goal for the club in the following four seasons. In July 2014, Lomić signed a two-year contract with Mordovia Saransk. He scored a brace in a 2–1 home league win over Krasnodar on 2 November 2014.

== International career ==
Lomić was selected by Vladimir Petrović in the 18-man squad to represent Serbia and Montenegro at the 2004 Summer Olympics. He appeared in all three group games; a 0–6 loss to Argentina, a 1–5 loss to Australia, and a 2–3 loss to Tunisia, as the team finished bottom of the table.

Subsequently, Lomić was a regular member of the national under-21 team during the UEFA Under-21 Championship 2006 qualifiers. He also played the full 90 minutes in all four of Serbia and Montenegro's matches in the final tournament, where they were eliminated in the semi-final by Ukraine after penalties.

In August 2006, Lomić was called up to the Serbia national team by manager Javier Clemente for their first match as an independent country against the Czech Republic, but an injury ruled him out of the game. He however appeared in an unofficial friendly against the Basque Country on 27 December 2006.

Eventually, Lomić made his debut for Serbia in a friendly match against Japan on 7 April 2010 in Osaka, playing the full 90 minutes. Although the team was composed of players from country's top domestic league, Serbia won 3–0. He also played in a shocking 1–3 loss at home to Estonia in a UEFA Euro 2012 qualifier on 8 October 2010. His third and final international was a November 2012 friendly match against Chile.

== Statistics ==
=== Club ===
Club	Season	League		Cup		Continental		Total	
Club	Season	Apps	Goals	Apps	Goals	Apps	Goals	Apps	Goals
Železnik	2002–03	21	0	0	0	—		21	0
Železnik	2003–04	29	0	0	0	—		29	0
Železnik	2004–05	22	0	0	0	0	0	22	0
Železnik	Total	72	0	0	0	0	0	72	0
Partizan	2005–06	29	1	2	0	5	0	36	1
Partizan	2006–07	21	2	3	1	7	0	31	3
Partizan	Total	50	3	5	1	12	0	67	4
TuS Koblenz	2007–08	30	0	1	2	—		31	2
TuS Koblenz	2008–09	23	0	1	0	—		24	0
TuS Koblenz	Total	53	0	2	2	—		55	2
Partizan	2009–10	25	3	4	0	4	0	33	3
Partizan	Total	25	3	4	0	4	0	33	3
Dynamo Moscow	2010	11	0	2	0	—		13	0
Dynamo Moscow	2011–12	36	1	2	0	—		38	1
Dynamo Moscow	2012–13	26	0	2	0	4	0	32	0
Dynamo Moscow	2013–14	22	0	1	0	—		23	0
Dynamo Moscow	Total	95	1	7	0	4	0	106	1
Mordovia Saransk	2014–15	17	3	2	0	—		19	3
Mordovia Saransk	2015–16	7	1	0	0	—		7	1
Mordovia Saransk	Total	24	4	2	0	—		26	4
Career total		319	11	20	3	20	0	359	14

=== International ===
National team	Year	Apps	Goals
Serbia	2010	2	0
Serbia	2011	0	0
Serbia	2012	1	0
Total		3	0

== Honours ==
=== Club ===
Železnik

- Serbia and Montenegro Cup: 2004–05

Partizan

- Serbian SuperLiga: 2009–10

=== Individual ===
- Serbian SuperLiga Team of the Season: 2009–10
