= Mladen Krstajić =

Serbian footballer (born 1974)

Mladen Krstajić Младен Крстајић
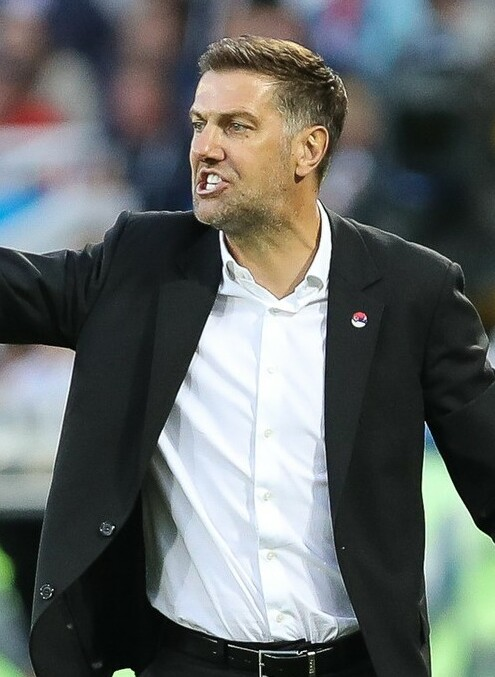
- Krstajić as Serbia manager at the 2018 FIFA World Cup

Personal information
- Full name: Mladen Krstajić
- Date of birth: 4 March 1974 (age 52)
- Place of birth: Zenica, SR Bosnia and Herzegovina, Yugoslavia
- Height: 1.91 m (6 ft 3 in)
- Position: Centre-back

Youth career
- 1984–1992: Čelik Zenica

Senior career*
Years	Team	Apps	(Gls)
1992–1993	Senta	16	(1)
1993–1996	Kikinda	55	(2)
1996–2000	Partizan	84	(7)
2000–2004	Werder Bremen	112	(11)
2004–2009	Schalke 04	131	(7)
2009–2011	Partizan	43	(3)
Total		441	(31)

International career
1999–2008	Serbia (Note: Including 48 caps and 2 goals for Serbia and Montenegro (known as FR Yugoslavia until 2003).)	59	(2)

Managerial career
- 2016–2017: Serbia (assistant)
- 2017–2019: Serbia
- 2021: TSC
- 2021–2022: Maccabi Tel Aviv
- 2022–2023: Bulgaria
- * Club domestic league appearances and goals

Mladen Krstajić (Serbian Cyrillic: Младен Крстајић, pronounced [mlǎden kr̩stâjitɕ]; born 4 March 1974) is a Serbian professional football manager and former player who played as a centre-back.

He represented Serbia and Montenegro at the 2006 FIFA World Cup. From January 2015 until March 2020, Krstajić served the role of chairman of the board of Bosnian Premier League club Radnik Bijeljina. Krstajić coached Serbia at the 2018 FIFA World Cup and then became head coach of Maccabi Tel Aviv in December 2021. He was manager of the Bulgaria national football team before being sacked in October 2023.

== Club career ==
=== Early career ===
Krstajić was born and raised in Zenica, SFR Yugoslavia, present day Bosnia and Herzegovina to a Bosnian Serb mother from Bijeljina and a father from Žabljak, Montenegro. After playing in the youth teams of Čelik Zenica, Krstajić moved to Kikinda, FR Yugoslavia, present day Serbia in April 1992, following the breakout of the Bosnian War. He started playing with Senta for six months. He then moved to OFK Kikinda, at that time a first league club. At some point of a successful career as a Serbian football player, there comes the time, to decide, whether one wants to play for Partizan or for Red Star Belgrade, and Krstajić decided to take the move to Partizan in 1996. According to Krstajić himself, Red Star was interested in him, but as he comes from a family that cheers for Partizan, he decided to sign a contract with his favourite club. His four and a half years at Partizan were more than successful, winning the national championships three times (1996, 1997, 1999) and also the national cup in 1998.

=== Werder Bremen and Schalke 04 ===
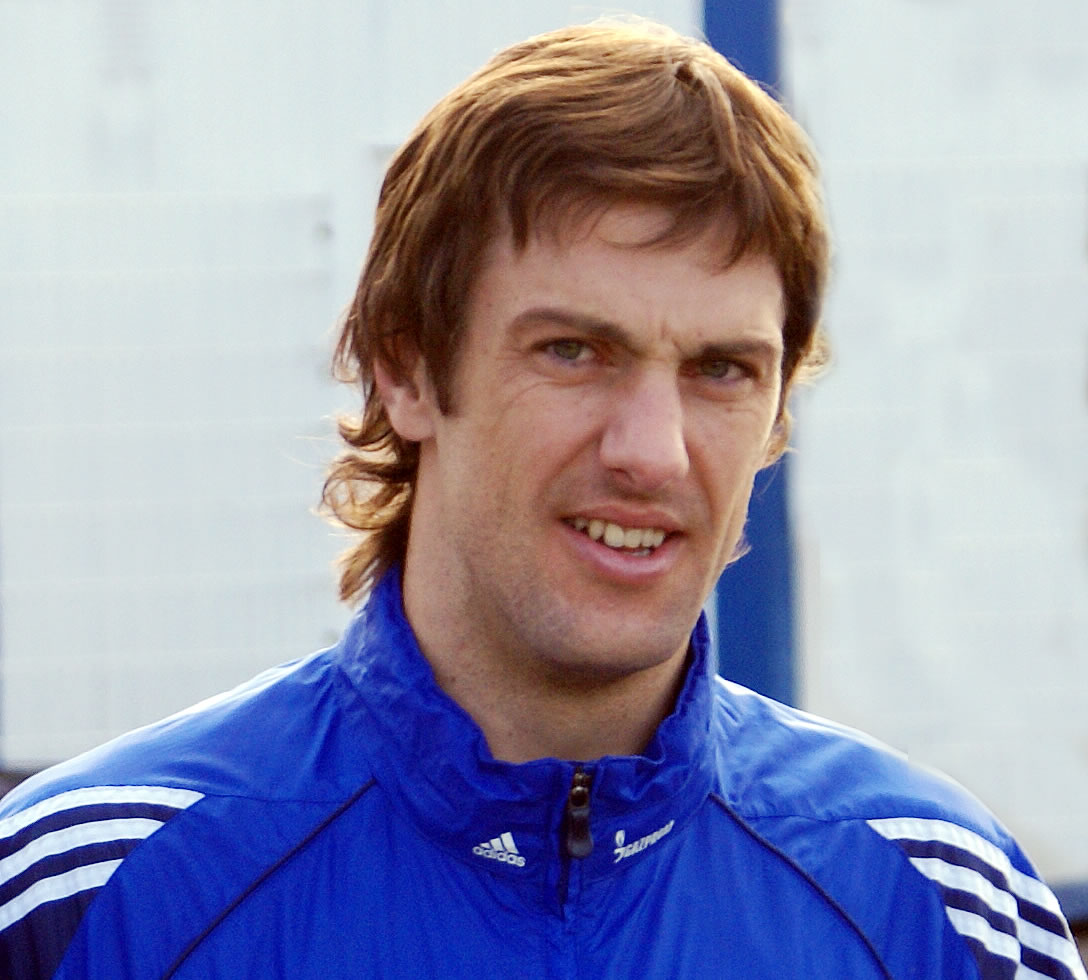
Krstajić with Schalke 04 in 2007.

In 2000, Krstajić joined German Bundesliga club Werder Bremen who paid a DM 1.8 million (about €950,000) transfer fee to Partizan. At Werder Bremen he was initially deployed at left-back in his first season but became one of the best central defenders in the Bundesliga, winning the double of Bundesliga and cup with Werder in 2004.

In 2004 he joined Schalke 04, where he was named the new captain on 17 March 2009.

=== Partizan ===
On 5 June 2009, Krstajić signed a two-year contract with his former club Partizan. In January 2010, after the departure of Nenad Đorđević, he was named the new Partizan captain. After two very successful seasons, Krstajić played his last professional match on 21 May 2011.

== International career ==
Krstajić was a part of the Serbia and Montenegro national team "Famous Four" defence, which conceded just one goal during the qualifying for the 2006 FIFA World Cup. The other members of the famous four were Ivica Dragutinović, Goran Gavrančić and Nemanja Vidić.

Between 1999 and 2008 he made 59 international appearances scoring 2 goals. He represented three senior national sides: FR Yugoslavia (1992–2002; 23 appearances, 2 goals), Serbia and Montenegro (2002–2006; 25 appearances), and Serbia (2006–2008; 11 appearances).

== Managerial career ==
=== Serbia ===
Krstajić began his managerial career as assistant coach of the Serbia national team for the 2018 FIFA World Cup qualifiers.

In October 2017 after head coach Slavoljub Muslin's dismissal, Krstajić succeeded him as head coach of the Serbia national team, initially as caretaker. Krstajić led the team on the Asian tour where Serbia defeated China (2–0) and drew with South Korea (1–1). In December, it was announced he would take on the role permanently and at least until the end of the 2018 FIFA World Cup.

On 13 June 2019, Krstajić was sacked from the position after a dismal 5–0 loss in a UEFA Euro 2020 qualifier against Ukraine.

=== TSC ===
Krstajić became head coach of TSC in January 2021. He left the club in October.

=== Maccabi Tel Aviv ===
On 9 December 2021, Krstajić was appointed manager of Israeli Premier League club Maccabi Tel Aviv.

=== Bulgaria ===
On 21 July 2022, Krstajić was named head coach of the Bulgaria national team until 2024. He was sacked from the position on 26 October 2023 due to bad results.

== Administrative career ==
Immediately after retiring from playing, Krstajić was appointed as the new director of football of FK Partizan on 1 June 2011. During the mid-season break, Krstajić attacked club president Dragan Đurić through the media, following Đurić's claim that Krstajić and head coach Aleksandar Stanojević were solely responsible for the unsuccessful campaign in UEFA competitions for the 2011–12 season. Krstajić stated that he and Stanojević did not have full control over the sale and acquisition of players during the summer transfer window, which affected the results on the field. On 26 December 2011, after less than six months as director of football, he was sacked.

Before becoming a manager, Krstajić became the new chairman of the board of Bosnian Premier League club Radnik Bijeljina on 23 January 2015.

During his time as club chairman, Radnik became a stable Bosnian Premier League club, finishing almost always in the top five or six. It won its first ever national and major trophy, the Bosnian Cup in the 2015–16 season and thus qualified for its first ever UEFA competition, the 2016–17 UEFA Europa League qualifying rounds.

In the 2018–19 Bosnian Premier League season, Radnik finished in fifth place, but as fourth placed Željezničar did not get an UEFA license to compete in the following season's UEFA Europa League, Radnik was qualified by default to the 2019–20 UEFA Europa League qualifying rounds for a second time in its history.

On 27 December 2019, Krstajić unexpectedly decided to leave Radnik, stating that it was time for someone new to lead the club. He officially left the club on 28 March 2020, with Predrag Perković succeeding him as chairman.

== Career statistics ==
=== Club ===
Appearances and goals by club, season and competition
Club	Season	League			Cup		League Cup		Continental		Total	
Club	Season	Division	Apps	Goals	Apps	Goals	Apps	Goals	Apps	Goals	Apps	Goals
Kikinda	1993–94	First League of FR Yugoslavia	24	0			—		—		24	0
Kikinda	1994–95	Second League of FR Yugoslavia	31	2			—		—		31	2
Kikinda	Total		55	2			—		—		55	2
Partizan	1995–96	First League of FR Yugoslavia	6	1	1	0	—		—		6	1
Partizan	1996–97	First League of FR Yugoslavia	11	0	0	0	—		1	0	12	0
Partizan	1997–98	First League of FR Yugoslavia	21	4	4	0	—		2	0	23	4
Partizan	1998–99	First League of FR Yugoslavia	17	0	7	2	—		4	1	21	3
Partizan	1999–00	First League of FR Yugoslavia	29	2	2	0	—		6	2	37	4
Partizan	Total		84	7	14	2	—		13	3	111	12
Werder Bremen	2000–01	Bundesliga	25	2	2	0	0	0	5	0	32	2
Werder Bremen	2001–02	Bundesliga	26	2	2	0	0	0	2	0	30	2
Werder Bremen	2002–03	Bundesliga	31	4	5	0	1	0	4	1	41	5
Werder Bremen	2003–04	Bundesliga	30	3	5	0	0	0	4	0	39	3
Werder Bremen	Total		112	11	14	0	1	0	15	1	142	12
Schalke 04	2004–05	Bundesliga	28	1	5	1	0	0	12	1	45	3
Schalke 04	2005–06	Bundesliga	29	2	1	0	2	0	12	0	44	2
Schalke 04	2006–07	Bundesliga	27	1	2	0	0	0	0	0	29	1
Schalke 04	2007–08	Bundesliga	23	2	2	0	3	0	6	0	34	2
Schalke 04	2008–09	Bundesliga	24	1	3	0	—		4	0	31	1
Schalke 04	Total		131	7	13	1	5	0	34	1	183	9
Partizan	2009–10	Serbian SuperLiga	22	2	1	0	—		9	2	32	4
Partizan	2010–11	Serbian SuperLiga	21	1	4	0	—		12	0	37	1
Partizan	Total		43	3	5	0	—		21	2	69	5
Career total			425	30	46	3	6	0	83	7	560	40

=== International ===
Appearances and goals by national team and year
National team	Year	Apps	Goals
FR Yugoslavia; Serbia and Montenegro; Serbia	1999	2	0
FR Yugoslavia; Serbia and Montenegro; Serbia	2000	5	0
FR Yugoslavia; Serbia and Montenegro; Serbia	2001	5	1
FR Yugoslavia; Serbia and Montenegro; Serbia	2002	11	1
FR Yugoslavia; Serbia and Montenegro; Serbia	2003	7	0
FR Yugoslavia; Serbia and Montenegro; Serbia	2004	5	0
FR Yugoslavia; Serbia and Montenegro; Serbia	2005	8	0
FR Yugoslavia; Serbia and Montenegro; Serbia	2006	10	0
FR Yugoslavia; Serbia and Montenegro; Serbia	2007	4	0
FR Yugoslavia; Serbia and Montenegro; Serbia	2008	2	0
Total		59	2

== Managerial statistics ==
As of 17 October 2023

Managerial record by team and tenure
Team	From	To	Record							
Team	From	To	G	W	D	L	GF	GA	GD	Win %
Serbia	30 October 2017	13 June 2019	19	9	5	5	30	21	+9	47.37
TSC	4 January 2021	19 October 2021	33	15	8	10	51	37	+14	45.45
Maccabi Tel Aviv	9 December 2021	24 May 2022	30	17	8	5	57	28	+29	56.67
Bulgaria	21 July 2022	26 October 2023	12	3	3	6	15	20	−5	25.00
Total			94	44	24	26	149	100	+49	46.81

== Honours ==
=== Player ===
Partizan

- Serbian SuperLiga: 1995–96, 1996–97, 1998–99, 2009–10, 2010–11
- Serbian Cup: 1997–98, 2010–11

Werder Bremen

- Bundesliga: 2003–04
- DFB-Pokal: 2003–04

Schalke 04

- DFL-Ligapokal: 2005
- UEFA Intertoto Cup: 2004
