= Predrag Mijić (footballer) =

Serbian footballer

Personal information
- Full name: Predrag Mijić
- Date of birth: 5 November 1984 (age 42)
- Place of birth: Žabalj, SFR Yugoslavia
- Height: 1.79 m (5 ft 10 in)
- Position: Winger

Senior career*
Years	Team	Apps	(Gls)
2002–2004	Cement Beočin	20	(2)
2004–2005	ČSK Čelarevo	7	(2)
2005	→ Ružomberok (loan)	4	(1)
2005–2006	OFK Beograd	0	(0)
2006	→ Spartak Subotica (loan)	17	(2)
2006–2009	Spartak Subotica	100	(20)
2006–2007	→ Bečej (loan)	8	(4)
2010	Partizan	4	(0)
2011–2012	Amkar Perm	10	(0)
2013	Mladost Bački Jarak	10	(0)
2013–2015	ŽSK Žabalj		
2016	Hajduk Čurug		
Total		180	(31)
- * Club domestic league appearances and goals

Predrag Mijić (Serbian Cyrillic: Предраг Мијић; born 5 November 1984) is a Serbian retired footballer who played as a winger.

== Career ==
During his playing career, Mijić had the most successful period at Spartak Subotica, securing him a transfer to Partizan in the 2010 winter transfer window. He also appeared in the top level leagues of Slovakia and Russia.
