= Jagodina City Stadium =

Multi-use stadium in Jagodina, Serbia

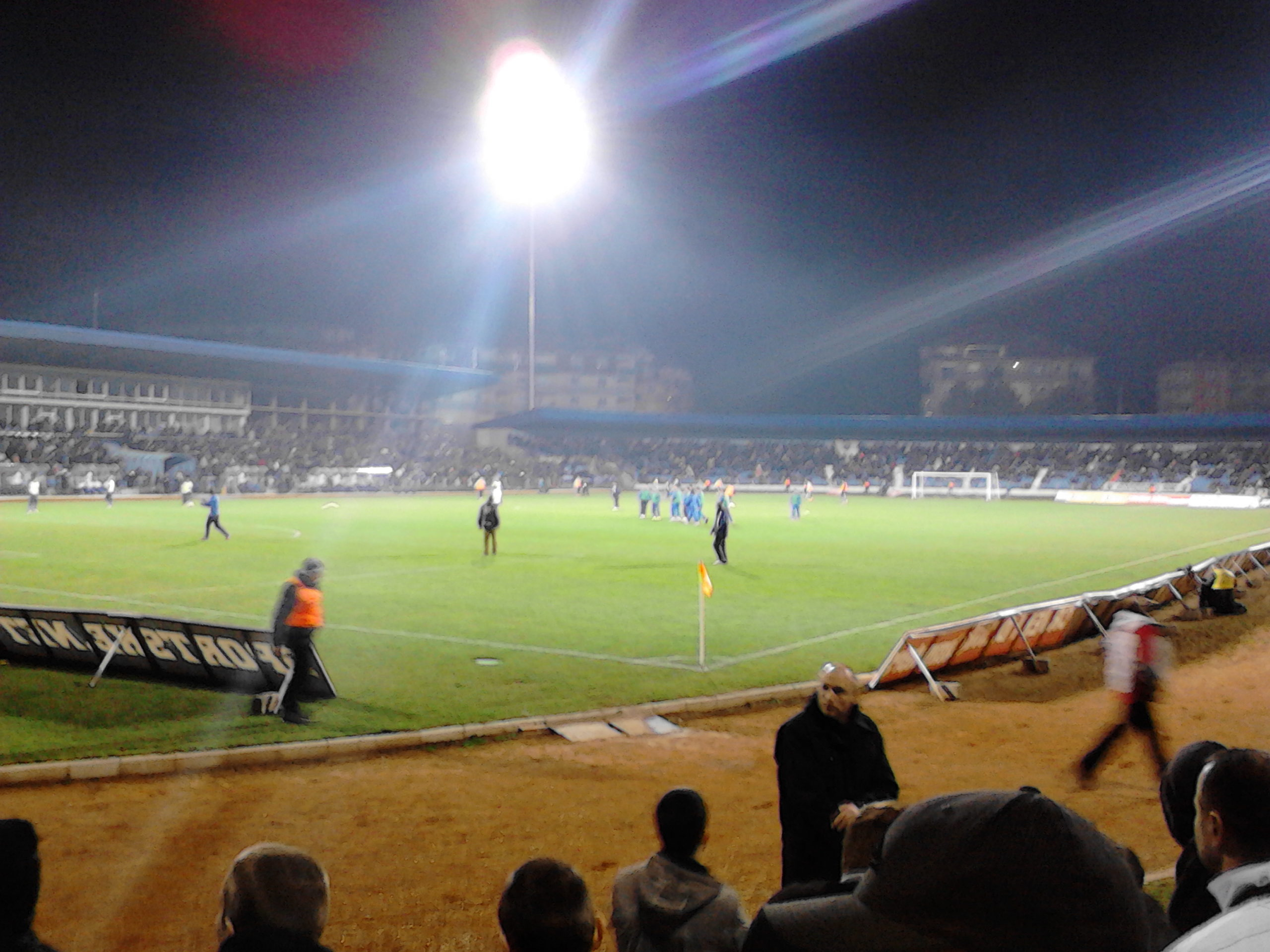
- Jagodina City Stadium during a Serbian SuperLiga match, Jagodina vs. Partizan, in March 2013.
- Interactive map of Jagodina City Stadium
- Full name: Jagodina City Stadium
- Location: Jagodina, Serbia
- Coordinates: 43°58′7.86″N 21°16′6.28″E
- Owner: FK Jagodina, Tabane-Jagodina
- Operator: FK Jagodina, Tabane-Jagodina
- Capacity: 9,977
- Surface: Grass
- Scoreboard: Yes
- Field size: 105 x 68 m

Construction
- Built: 1958
- Renovated: 2007-2008 (completely reconstructed); 2009 (roof of the north stand was completed); 2009 (new sports turf laid); 2012 (new floodlights); 2013 (new seats for the south stand)
- Expanded: 2009

Tenants
- FK Jagodina, Tabane-Jagodina

Jagodina City Stadium (Serbian: Градски стадион у Јагодини / Gradski stadion u Jagodini), locally known as Stadion pod Đurđevim brdom (Serbian Cyrillic: Стадион под Ђурђевим брдом; Stadium under the Đurđev-Hill), is a multi-use all-seated stadium in Jagodina, Serbia. It is currently used mostly for football matches and is the home matches of FK Jagodina. The stadium has a seating capacity for 9,977 people.

== History ==
The stadium is located in the very south of Jagodina and is part of the sports and leisure complex Đurđevo brdo. In the immediate vicinity of the stadium are another football pitch, a modern water park and the Zoo Park Jagodina, a tennis court complex and a sports hall, as well as a kart racing track, a hotel and nature park.

It was built in 1958 and had a capacity of up to 20,000 spectators, but has been completely renovated from 2007 to 2008, which significantly reduced the capacity. New seats were installed, except the south stand, and a roof was constructed in the west stand along with VIP rooms, while the roof of the north stand was completed 2009. In the north stand is also a smaller hotel located.

In 2009, the field was renovated and a new sports turf laid. This process costs more than 200,000 Euro. In 2012, a small restaurant was opened in the stadium named Blue Café. The stadium has also a professional gym. In the same year, FK Jagodina installed floodlights with strength of 1,500 lux. Its installation cost was about 400,000 Euro. In 2013, the southern stand was also equipped with seats, so the stadium is owned by four seat grandstands.

At the stadium are planned more renovations or projects, such as the construction of living rooms under the north stand, which are intended for the club players, as well as the completion of the west stand. Other future projects include a new blue tartan track, the main color of the club, as well as further reconstruction on the east and south stand, including its roofing.

== See also ==
- List of stadiums in Serbia
- FK Jagodina
- Serbian SuperLiga
