= 2009–10 Serbian SuperLiga =

4th season of Serbian SuperLiga

Jelen SuperLiga
- Season: 2009–10
- Champions: Partizan; 3rd SuperLiga title 22nd domestic title
- Relegated: Mladi Radnik; Napredak
- Champions League: Partizan
- Europa League: Red Star; OFK Beograd; Spartak
- Matches: 240
- Goals: 531 (2.21 per match)
- Top goalscorer: Dragan Mrđa (22)
- Biggest home win: Vojvodina 7–0 Napredak
- Biggest away win: Borča 0–4 Vojvodina
- Highest scoring: Red Star 5–2 Spartak

The 2009–10 Serbian SuperLiga (known as the Jelen SuperLiga for sponsorship reasons) is the fourth season of the SuperLiga since its establishment in 2006. It began on 15 August 2009 and ended on 16 May 2010. A total of sixteen teams contested the league, with Partizan the defending champions.

== Changes from the 2008–09 season ==
=== Structure changes ===
The league size was expanded from twelve teams to sixteen prior to this season. As a consequence, the number of matches for each team was reduced from 33 to 30.

=== Team changes ===
Due to the league expansion, only 12th-placed Banat Zrenjanin were relegated to the First League. They were replaced by the 2008–09 First League champions BSK Borča. The other four teams achieving promotion were (in order of their finish) FK Smederevo, Mladi Radnik, Spartak Zlatibor Voda and Metalac Gornji Milanovac.

== Stadia ==
Location of teams in the 2009–10 Serbian SuperLiga

Team	City	Stadium	Capacity
FK BSK	Borča	Stadion Borča	3,930
FK Borac	Čačak	Čačak Stadium	5,000
FK Čukarički	Belgrade	Čukarički Stadium	7,000
FK Hajduk	Kula	Stadion Hajduk	11,000
FK Jagodina	Jagodina	Stadion FK Jagodina	15,000
FK Javor	Ivanjica	Javor Stadium	5,000
FK Metalac	Gornji Milanovac	Čika Dača Stadium	15,100
FK Mladi radnik	Požarevac	Vašarište	3,200
FK Napredak	Kruševac	Stadion Mladost	10,811
OFK Beograd	Belgrade	Omladinski Stadium	13,912
FK Partizan	Belgrade	Partizan Stadium	32,887
FK Rad	Belgrade	Stadion Kralj Petar I	6,000
FK Crvena zvezda	Belgrade	Stadion FK Crvena Zvezda	51,328
FK Smederevo	Smederevo	Smederevo City Stadium	16,656
FK Spartak	Subotica	Subotica City Stadium	13,000
FK Vojvodina	Novi Sad	Stadion Karađorđe	12,608

== League table ==
Pos	Team	Pld	W	D	L	GF	GA	GD	Pts	Qualification or relegation
1	Partizan (C)	30	24	6	0	63	14	+49	78	Qualification for Champions League second qualifying round
2	Red Star Belgrade	30	23	2	5	53	17	+36	71	Qualification for Europa League third qualifying round (Note: Red Star Belgrade as 2009–10 Serbian Cup winners have qualified for the third qualifying round of the UEFA Europa League.)
3	OFK Beograd	30	15	5	10	38	33	+5	50	Qualification for Europa League second qualifying round
4	Spartak Zlatibor Voda	30	14	7	9	34	27	+7	49	Qualification for Europa League second qualifying round
5	Vojvodina	30	13	6	11	51	30	+21	45	
6	Jagodina	30	12	7	11	38	34	+4	43	
7	Javor Ivanjica	30	8	14	8	22	23	−1	38	
8	Rad	30	10	7	13	38	39	−1	37	
9	Metalac G.M.	30	10	5	15	24	39	−15	35	
10	Smederevo	30	8	10	12	23	30	−7	34	
11	Borac Čačak	30	9	7	14	21	34	−13	34	
12	BSK Borča	30	9	6	15	27	37	−10	33	
13	Čukarički	30	9	5	16	25	46	−21	32	
14	Hajduk Kula	30	7	9	14	28	40	−12	30	
15	Napredak Kruševac (R)	30	7	8	15	30	44	−14	29	Relegation to Serbian First League
16	Mladi radnik (R)	30	5	10	15	19	47	−28	25	Relegation to Serbian First League

Source: SuperLiga
Rules for classification: 1) points; 2) goal difference; 3) number of goals scored.
(C) Champions; (R) Relegated

== Results ==
Home \ Away	BOR	BSK	ČUK	HAJ	JAG	JAV	MET	MLR	NAP	OFK	PAR	RAD	RSB	SME	SZV	VOJ
Borac Čačak		2–0	2–1	1–1	2–1	1–0	1–0	1–0	0–1	2–0	0–3	0–0	0–0	3–1	1–2	0–0
BSK Borča	2–0		2–0	3–0	1–4	1–0	0–0	2–3	1–1	1–0	1–2	0–0	0–1	0–0	0–2	0–4
Čukarički	1–0	1–0		2–0	2–1	0–1	0–1	1–1	2–1	0–0	1–1	2–1	0–3	0–0	0–3	1–3
Hajduk Kula	2–0	0–0	2–1		1–1	1–1	1–1	2–0	3–1	0–2	0–2	2–1	0–1	1–2	2–1	0–3
Jagodina	0–1	2–0	2–0	2–0		2–0	3–1	2–0	1–1	3–2	0–0	1–0	0–3	2–0	3–1	2–2
Javor Ivanjica	1–1	1–0	2–2	1–1	0–0		2–0	0–0	1–0	0–1	1–1	2–2	0–2	1–0	1–0	1–1
Metalac G.M.	1–0	1–3	0–1	2–1	2–3	1–0		1–0	1–0	2–1	0–2	1–1	2–1	0–2	0–0	3–1
Mladi Radnik	2–1	2–0	1–4	1–3	0–0	1–0	1–0		1–1	0–2	1–1	0–0	0–1	0–0	1–1	1–3
Napredak Kruševac	2–0	1–2	0–2	2–0	2–1	1–1	2–0	0–0		1–2	0–1	2–1	1–1	2–2	2–3	2–0
OFK Beograd	3–2	0–2	4–1	2–1	1–0	0–0	3–2	3–0	1–1		0–3	3–2	0–2	1–0	0–1	2–2
Partizan	5–0	2–1	3–0	1–0	3–0	0–0	3–1	6–0	3–1	3–0		2–1	1–0	2–1	2–0	1–0
Rad	0–0	2–0	2–0	1–1	1–0	3–2	3–0	3–2	2–1	0–2	2–3		1–2	3–2	1–3	1–0
Red Star Belgrade	1–0	1–3	4–0	1–0	1–0	0–1	3–0	4–1	2–1	2–1	1–2	1–0		2–1	5–2	3–0
Smederevo	0–0	1–1	1–0	0–0	2–0	1–1	0–1	0–0	1–0	0–1	0–2	2–1	0–3		2–0	1–0
Spartak Zlatibor Voda	1–0	2–1	1–0	1–1	1–1	0–0	0–0	2–0	2–0	0–1	1–1	1–0	0–1	2–0		0–1
Vojvodina	3–0	2–0	4–0	3–2	4–1	0–1	1–0	3–0	7–0	0–0	1–2	2–3	0–1	1–1	0–1	

Source: SuperLiga
Legend: Blue = home team win; Yellow = draw; Red = away team win.

== Top goalscorers ==
Including matches played on 16 May 2010; Sources: Superliga official website, soccerway.com

Rank	Scorer	Club	Goals
1	(Serbia) Dragan Mrđa	Vojvodina	22
2	(Serbia) Andrija Kaluđerović	Rad	17
3	(Brazil) Cléo	Partizan	14
3	(Senegal) Lamine Diarra	Partizan	14
5	(Serbia) Milan Bojović	Jagodina	12
5	(Serbia) Dejan Lekić	Red Star	12

== Hat-tricks ==
Player	For	Against	Result	Date
(Senegal) Lamine Diarra	Partizan	Borac Čačak	5-0	15 August 2009
(Serbia) Dragan Mrđa	Vojvodina	BSK Borča	4–0	3 October 2009
(Serbia) Dragan Mrđa	Vojvodina	Borac Čačak	4–0	21 November 2009
(Serbia) Aleksandar Jevtić	Red Star	Čukarički	4-0	1 May 2010
(Serbia) Dragan Mrđa^{4}	Vojvodina	Napredak	7–0	16 May 2010
(Senegal) Lamine Diarra	Partizan	Mladi Radnik	6–0	16 May 2010

^{4} Player scored 4 goals

== Awards ==
=== Player of the Year ===
The Player of the Year was awarded to Dragan Mrđa (FK Vojvodina).

=== Young Player of the Year ===
The Young Player of the Year was awarded to Saša Marković (OFK Beograd).

=== Team of the Year ===
Position	Player	Team
GK	(Serbia) Saša Stamenković	Crvena zvezda
DF	(Serbia) Pavle Ninkov	Crvena zvezda
DF	(Serbia) Marko Lomić	Partizan
DF	(Serbia) Milan Vilotić	Crvena zvezda
DF	(Serbia) Mladen Krstajić	Partizan
MF	(Serbia) Ljubomir Fejsa	Partizan
MF	(Serbia) Radosav Petrović	Partizan
MF	(Serbia) Nikola Lazetić	Crvena zvezda
MF	(Serbia) Dušan Tadić	Vojvodina
MF	(Guinea-Bissau) Almami Moreira	Partizan
FW	(Serbia) Dragan Mrđa	Vojvodina

=== Manager of the Year ===
The Manager of the Year was awarded to Zoran Milinković (FK Spartak).

== Champion squad ==
- 2009–10 FK Partizan season

== Transfers ==
- List of Serbian football transfers summer 2009
- List of Serbian football transfers winter 2009–10
