= Stadion Milan Sredanović =

Football stadium in Serbia

Coordinates: 45°36′35″N 19°31′42″E

- Bombonjera
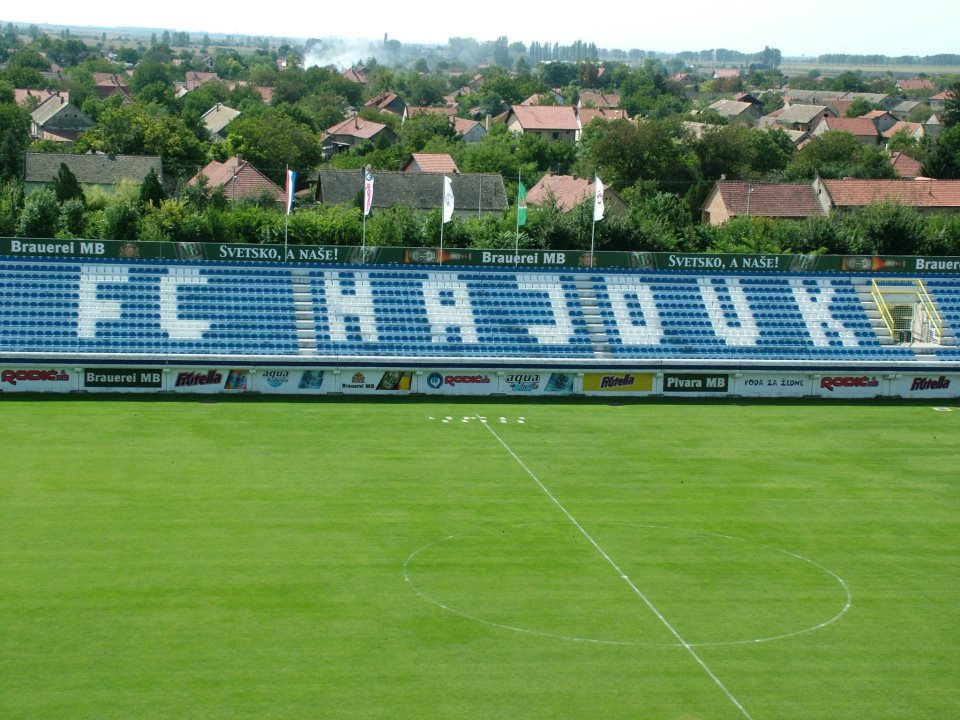
- Stadion Milan Sredanović
- Interactive map of Stadion Milan Sredanović
- Location: Kula, Serbia
- Owner: Kula municipality
- Operator: Sportski centar opštine Kula
- Capacity: 5,973 (seated)

Construction
- Opened: 1992; 34 years ago
- Architect: Miodrag Rakočević

Tenant
- Hajduk 1912

Stadion Milan Sredanović is a football stadium in Kula, Vojvodina, Serbia. The stadium was opened in 1992 and has a seating capacity for 5,973 spectators. It is the home ground of football club Hajduk 1912.

== History ==
Stadium was completed in 1992 and the architect was Miodrag Rakočević. Arena was built on the initiative of Hajduk Kula, with participation of club's players, managers and fans. Funding was raised mostly from private sources (the club at that time began to be sponsored by local company Rodić M&B), with only small help from the city authorities. Concrete parts of new stadium were ordered from company from Murska Sobota (Slovenia); because of outbreak of war, some of that elements has never reached Kula. Stadium was constructed at the site of previous football pitch used by Hajduk Kula, which was equipped with prefabricated stands and was created partly at the site of former Kula Sinagogue, destroyed in 1948.

On 1991–92 season, the last season of Socialist Federal Republic of Yugoslavia, Hajduk played in Yugoslav Second League and finished on the second place, gaining promotion to the top division. From 1992–93 season they played every year in the First League of FR Yugoslavia (later renamed to First League of Serbia and Montenegro) and after Montenegrin independence in 2006 they continued to play in Serbian SuperLiga until 2013, when the club was dissolved due to financial difficulties. At the same time OFK Hajduk was created, which had only youth teams. In 2015 Hajduk Junior was founded, which started playing competitive matches with its senior team. In 2018 team was merged with OFK Odžaci, changed its name to Hajduk 1912 and started to play in Serbian League Vojvodina.

In 1990s Hajduk fans, called "Zulovci", were considered as one of the most organized and dangerous hooligan groups in the country.

In the summer of 1997 Hajduk debuted in European competitions by entering group stage of UEFA Intertoto Cup. In two of four games Hajduk was a host, so they were played at Hajduk's Stadium, it was against Halmstads BK (lost 0:1 by the hosts) and Kongsvinger IL (which was staged at fully crowded stadium and ended with 2:0 victory of Hajduk). For the second time Hajduk appeared on the international stage in 2006, when club competed in second qualifying round of UEFA Cup. This time however, due to UEFA objections, Hajduk couldn't play their home game at own ground, so it was moved to Red Star Stadium in Belgrade. Hajduk had to play its own games at Red Star Stadium also in 2007, when they entered UEFA Intertoto Cup for the second time.

Stadium also hosted games of youth national football teams.

Due to renovation of their own ground, FK Spartak Subotica played their home games at Stadion Milan Sredanović during the first half of 2018–19 Serbian SuperLiga season.

On 19 May 2017 a ceremony was held at the stadium in connection to naming it after Milan Sredanović, who died in March 2016. Milan Sredanović (born in 1948 in Nikšić) is considered as one of the best goalkeepers from Hajduk. After finishing his football career, among other things, he worked as a coach in Hajduk and director of a stadium during period of its construction. In 2020 an annual tournament for young footballers, played at the stadium and named after Milan Sredanović (Memorijalni turnir “Milan Sredanović”), was established.

In January 2018 municipality bought the stadium for 18,35 million dinars. In 2020 newly established institution "Sportski centar opštine Kula" ("Kula municipality sports center") became an operator of the facility.

== Description ==
Stadium stands in the center of the city, on the shore of Great Bačka Canal. It is football-specific stadium with stands situated close to the pitch lines. Higher, uncovered stands runs along northern goal line, western touchline and southern goal line. On the eastern side there is smaller, but roofed stand. Stadium has in total 5,973 seats for spectators. From 2017 it is named after Milan Sredanović, earlier it was simply called "Stadion Hajduka" ("Hajduk's Stadium"). Popular nickname of the arena is "Bombonjera".
