= 2007–08 FK Partizan season =

Partizan
2007–08 season
- President: Tomislav Karadžić
- Head coach: Miroslav Đukić (until 19 December 2007); Slaviša Jokanović
- Serbian SuperLiga: Winners
- Serbian Cup: Winners
- UEFA Cup: First qualifying round
- Top goalscorer: League: Diarra & Jovetić (12 goals); All: Diarra (20 goals)

The 2007–08 season was FK Partizan's 2nd season in Serbian SuperLiga. This article shows player statistics and all matches (official and friendly) that the club played during the 2007–08 season.

== Tournaments ==
	Competition	Position
(Serbia)	Serbian SuperLiga	Winners
(Serbia)	Serbian Cup	Winners
(European Union)	UEFA Cup	First qualifying round

== Players ==
=== Squad information ===
Note: Flags indicate national team as defined under FIFA eligibility rules; some limited exceptions apply. Players may hold more than one non-FIFA nationality.

No.	Pos.	Nation	Player
1	GK	MNE	Darko Božović
2	DF	SRB	Milivoje Ćirković
4	DF	SRB	Nemanja Rnić
5	DF	SRB	Milovan Sikimić
6	DF	SRB	Milan Vještica
8	MF	BRA	Juca
10	MF	POR	Almami Moreira
11	FW	SRB	Žarko Lazetić
13	DF	SRB	Marko Jovanović
14	MF	SRB	Đorđe Lazić
16	DF	MNE	Risto Lakić
17	MF	SRB	Zoran Tošić
18	DF	MKD	Aleksandar Lazevski
20	MF	POR	Ednilson

No.	Pos.	Nation	Player
23	DF	SRB	Mladen Lazarević
24	DF	SRB	Srđa Knežević
26	FW	SEN	Lamine Diarra
27	GK	MNE	Mladen Božović
30	GK	SRB	Aleksandar Radosavljević
31	MF	SRB	Nikola Mitrović
33	MF	BIH	Darko Maletić
35	FW	MNE	Stevan Jovetić (captain)
37	MF	SRB	Ivan Obradović
44	DF	SRB	Nenad Đorđević
82	MF	MNE	Marko Ćetković
88	FW	MKD	Dragan Čadikovski
99	FW	MNE	Slaven Stjepanović

== Competitions ==
=== Overview ===
Competition	Record							
Competition	P	W	D	L	GF	GA	GD	Win %
Superliga	33	24	8	1	63	23	+40	72.73
Serbian Cup	5	5	0	0	18	4	+14	100.00
UEFA Cup	2	2	0	0	11	1	+10	100.00
Total	40	31	8	1	92	28	+64	77.50

=== Serbian SuperLiga ===
==== League table ====
Pos	Team	Pld	W	D	L	GF	GA	GD	Pts	Qualification or relegation
1	Partizan (C)	33	24	8	1	63	23	+40	80	Qualification for Champions League second qualifying round
2	Red Star	33	21	12	0	65	22	+43	75	Qualification for UEFA Cup second qualifying round
3	Vojvodina	33	18	8	7	53	33	+20	62	Qualification for UEFA Cup first qualifying round
4	Borac Čačak	33	12	10	11	29	33	−4	46	Qualification for UEFA Cup first qualifying round
5	Napredak	33	11	8	14	25	33	−8	41	

Source: soccerway.com
(C) Champions

==== Matches ====
Date	Round	Opponents	Ground	Result	Scorers
11 August 2007.	1	Vojvodina	A	1 – 0	Jovetić 27'
18 August 2007	2	Čukarički	A	3 – 0	Moreira 24' Jovetić 28' Lazetić 90'
26 August 2007	3	FK Banat	H	4 – 2	Diarra 42' Jovetić 61' Lazić 70' Moreira 80'
2 September 2007	4	OFK	A	1 – 0	Jovetić 56'
16 September 2007	5	Napredak Kruševac	H	3 – 1	Tošić 56' Diarra 13' Lazić 73'
22 September 2007	6	Mladost	A	4 – 1	Diarra 34' 64' Lazevski 54' Stjepanovic 90'
29 September 2007	7	Crvena zvezda	H	2 – 2	Jovetić 64' Moreira 78'
6 October 2007	8	Smederevo	A	1 – 1	Jovetić 56'
21 October 2007	9	Hajduk	H	2 – 1	Jovetić 50' Lazić 63'
27 October 2007	10	Bezanija	A	2 – 0	Lazić 70' Juca 76'
31 October 2007	11	Borac	H	0 – 0	
4 November 2007	12	Vojvodina	H	3 – 3	Diarra 1' Jovetić 9' Tošić 69'
10 November 2007	13	Čukarički	H	1 – 1	Juca 90+3'
1 December 2007	14	FK Banat	A	2 – 0	Tošić 10' Lazevski 66'
8 December 2007	15	OFK	H	5 – 1	Diarra 9' Moreira 39' Jovetić 43' Rukavina 45' Lazić 79'
12 December 2007	16	Napredak Kruševac	A	2 – 0	Moreira 58' Jovetić 69'
15 December 2007	17	Mladost	H	4 – 0	Juca 2' Diarra 65' Tošić 72' Jovetić 85'
1 March 2008	18	Crvena zvezda	A	4 – 1	Lazić 3'
8 March 2008	19	Smederevo	H	1 – 0	Đorđević 35'
15 March 2008	20	Hajduk	A	1 – 0	Đorđević 77'
18 March 2008	21	Bežanija	H	2 – 0	Čadikovski 6', 19'
30 March 2008	22	Borac	A	1 – 0	Đorđević 90+2'
2 April 2008	23	Bežanija	H	2 – 2	Đorđević 35' Moreira 45'
5 April 2008	24	Crvena zvezda	H	1 – 1	Juca 29'
12 April 2008	25	Vojvodina	A	1 – 1	Đorđević 49'
20 April 2008	26	Borac	H	1 – 0	Diarra 37'
26 April 2008	27	Čukarički	A	1 – 0	Tošić 85'
30 April 2008	28	Mladost	H	2 – 0	Diarra 50' Jovetić 55'
3 May 2008	29	Smederevo	A	1 – 0	Tošić 56'
10 May 2008	30	Banat	H	3 – 1	Tošić 11', 35' Juca 90'
14 May 2008	31	OFK	A	3 – 1	Moreira 33' Đorđević 36' Diarra 44'
17 May 2008	32	Hajduk	H	1 – 0	Diarra 58'
25 May 2008	33	Napredak Kruševac	A	1 – 0	Diarra 67'

=== Serbian Cup ===
Round	Opponents	Ground	Result	Scorers
1/16	Rad	H	4 – 1	Jovetić 2' Lazetić 50' Juca 67' Veselinović 87'
1/8	Srem	A	3 – 0	Jovetić 20' Tošić 55' Jovanović 75' (o.g.)
1/4	Sinđelić	H	5 – 1	Čadikovski 24', 38' Juca 55' Lazić 61' Lazetić 74'
1/2	Crvena Zvezda	A	3 – 2	Diarra 13', 22' Jovetić 79'
final	Zemun	H	3 – 0	Diarra 12', 41', 90+2'

=== UEFA Cup ===
Date	Round	Opponents	Ground	Result	Scorers
19 July 2007	First qualifying round	(Bosnia and Herzegovina) Zrinjski	A	6 – 1	Diarra 32', 60', 63' Maletić 40' Jovetić 48' Lazetić 80'
2 August 2007	First qualifying round	(Bosnia and Herzegovina) Zrinjski	H	5 – 0	Maletić 4' Moreira 32' Jovetić 37', 51', 71'

- UEFA expelled Partizan from the 2007–08 UEFA Cup due to crowd trouble at their away tie in Mostar, which forced the match to be interrupted for 10 minutes. UEFA adjudged travelling Partizan fans to have been the culprits of the trouble, but Partizan were allowed to play the return leg while the appeal was being processed. However, Partizan's appeal was rejected so Zrinjski Mostar qualified.

=== Trofeo Santiago Bernabéu ===
Date	Round	Opponents	Ground	Result	Scorers
5 December 2007	Final	(Spain) Real Madrid	A	2 – 0	
