= Adrián Marín (footballer, born 1997) =

Spanish footballer (born 1997)

- Marín with Orlando City in 2026

Personal information
- Full name: Adrián Marín Gómez
- Date of birth: 9 January 1997 (age 29)
- Place of birth: Torre-Pacheco, Spain
- Height: 1.81 m (5 ft 11 in)
- Position: Left-back

Team information
- Current team: Orlando City
- Number: 3

Youth career
- San Ginés
- 2009–2014: Villarreal

Senior career*
| Years | Team | Apps | (Gls) |
| 2013–2014 | Villarreal C | 15 | (0) |
| 2013–2016 | Villarreal B | 19 | (1) |
| 2014–2018 | Villarreal | 18 | (0) |
| 2016–2017 | → Leganés (loan) | 13 | (0) |
| 2018–2021 | Alavés | 23 | (0) |
| 2021–2022 | Granada | 9 | (0) |
| 2021–2022 | → Famalicão (loan) | 29 | (4) |
| 2022–2023 | Gil Vicente | 31 | (0) |
| 2023–2025 | Braga | 18 | (0) |
| 2025– | Orlando City | 28 | (0) |

International career
| 2014 | Spain U17 | 4 | (0) |
| 2014 | Spain U18 | 1 | (0) |
| 2014–2016 | Spain U19 | 3 | (3) |
| 2016 | Spain U21 | 1 | (0) |
- * Club domestic league appearances and goals as of 23:48, 7 November 2026 (UTC)

Adrián Marín Gómez (born 9 January 1997) is a Spanish professional footballer who plays as a left-back for Major League Soccer club Orlando City.

== Club career ==
=== Villarreal ===
Born in Torre-Pacheco, Region of Murcia, Marín joined local Villarreal's academy in 2009 at the age of 12. He made his senior debut with the C team in the 2013–14 season in the Tercera División, and also appeared with the reserves in the Segunda División B the same year.

In May 2014, Marín was called up to the main squad by manager Marcelino García Toral for the preseason trip to Asia. There, he featured in friendlies against Reus and Middlesbrough.

Marín played his first match as a professional on 28 August 2014, coming on as a substitute for Jaume Costa in the 57th minute of a 4–0 home win over Astana in the play-off round of the UEFA Europa League. His maiden La Liga appearance occurred on 14 September, when he started the scoreless draw at Granada.

On 20 July 2016, Marín was loaned to fellow top-tier club Leganés in a season-long deal. Upon returning, he extended his contract until 2021 and was definitely promoted to the first team.

=== Alavés ===
On 9 August 2018, Marín signed a three-year deal with Alavés. During his two-and-a-half-year spell at the Mendizorrotza Stadium, he appeared in only 28 competitive games.

=== Granada ===
Marín joined Granada on 1 February 2021, on a two-and-a-half-year contract. On 30 August, he moved to Primeira Liga side Famalicão on a one-year loan with a buyout clause. He totalled 33 appearances during his stint at the latter, scoring four goals.

=== Gil Vicente ===
On 13 August 2022, Marín agreed to a two-year deal at Gil Vicente also in the Portuguese top flight. On 23 October, he was sent off in the last seconds of the first half with his team winning 1–0, enabling hosts Chaves to come from behind and win 3–1.

=== Braga ===
Marín signed a three-year contract with Braga of the same country and league on 20 June 2023. He played 37 matches in all competitions during his tenure, scoring his only goal on 1 August 2024 in a 5–0 victory at Maccabi Petah Tikva in the Europa League second qualfying round.

=== Orlando City ===
On 7 August 2025, Marín joined Major League Soccer club Orlando City on a one-year deal for an undisclosed fee, with an option for the 2027 season. He made his debut 16 days later, as part of a heavily rotated starting line-up that lost 5–1 at Nashville SC.

== International career ==
Marín won his only cap for Spain at under-21 level on 24 March 2016, in a 3–0 home loss against Croatia in the 2017 UEFA European Championship qualifiers.

== Career statistics ==
As of match played 19 November 2026

Appearances and goals by club, season and competition
| Club | Season | League | | | National cup (Note: Includes Copa del Rey, Taça de Portugal, U.S. Open Cup) | | League cup (Note: Includes Taça da Liga and MLS Cup playoffs) | | Continental | | Other | | Total | |
| Club | Season | Division | Apps | Goals | Apps | Goals | Apps | Goals | Apps | Goals | Apps | Goals | Apps | Goals |
|---|---|---|---|---|---|---|---|---|---|---|---|---|---|---|
| Villarreal B | 2013–14 | Segunda División B | 3 | 0 | — | | — | | — | | — | | 3 | 0 |
| Villarreal B | 2014–15 | Segunda División B | 2 | 0 | — | | — | | — | | — | | 2 | 0 |
| Villarreal B | 2015–16 | Segunda División B | 14 | 1 | — | | — | | — | | 2 (Note: Appearances in Segunda División B play-offs) | 0 | 16 | 1 |
| Villarreal B | Total | | 19 | 1 | — | | — | | — | | 2 | 0 | 21 | 1 |
| Villarreal | 2014–15 | La Liga | 4 | 0 | 1 | 0 | — | | 4 (Note: Appearances in UEFA Europa League) | 0 | — | | 9 | 0 |
| Villarreal | 2015–16 | La Liga | 11 | 0 | 3 | 0 | — | | 2 | 0 | — | | 16 | 0 |
| Villarreal | 2017–18 | La Liga | 3 | 0 | 2 | 0 | — | | 3 | 0 | — | | 8 | 0 |
| Villarreal | Total | | 18 | 0 | 6 | 0 | — | | 9 | 0 | — | | 33 | 0 |
| Leganés (loan) | 2016–17 | La Liga | 13 | 0 | 1 | 0 | — | | — | | — | | 14 | 0 |
| Alavés | 2018–19 | La Liga | 6 | 0 | 1 | 0 | — | | — | | — | | 7 | 0 |
| Alavés | 2019–20 | La Liga | 12 | 0 | 1 | 0 | — | | — | | — | | 13 | 0 |
| Alavés | 2020–21 | La Liga | 5 | 0 | 3 | 0 | — | | — | | — | | 8 | 0 |
| Alavés | Total | | 23 | 0 | 5 | 0 | — | | — | | — | | 28 | 0 |
| Granada | 2020–21 | La Liga | 9 | 0 | 0 | 0 | — | | — | | — | | 9 | 0 |
| Granada | 2021–22 | La Liga | 0 | 0 | 0 | 0 | — | | — | | — | | 0 | 0 |
| Granada | Total | | 9 | 0 | 0 | 0 | — | | — | | — | | 9 | 0 |
| Famalicão (loan) | 2021–22 | Primeira Liga | 29 | 4 | 3 | 0 | 1 | 0 | — | | — | | 33 | 4 |
| Gil Vicente | 2022–23 | Primeira Liga | 31 | 0 | 1 | 0 | 4 | 0 | 1 (Note: Appearance in UEFA Europa Conference League) | 0 | — | | 37 | 0 |
| Braga | 2023–24 | Primeira Liga | 8 | 0 | 2 | 0 | 1 | 0 | 5 (Note: Appearances in UEFA Champions League) | 0 | — | | 16 | 0 |
| Braga | 2024–25 | Primeira Liga | 10 | 0 | 0 | 0 | 1 | 0 | 10 | 1 | — | | 21 | 1 |
| Braga | Total | | 18 | 0 | 2 | 0 | 2 | 0 | 15 | 1 | — | | 37 | 1 |
| Orlando City | 2025 | Major League Soccer | 5 | 0 | — | | 1 | 0 | — | | 2 (Note: Appearances in Leagues Cup) | 0 | 8 | 0 |
| Orlando City | 2026 | Major League Soccer | 23 | 0 | 3 | 0 | 1 | 0 | — | | 1 | 0 | 28 | 0 |
| Orlando City | Total | | 28 | 0 | 2 | 0 | 2 | 0 | — | | 3 | 0 | 35 | 0 |
| Career total | | | 187 | 5 | 20 | 0 | 9 | 0 | 25 | 1 | 5 | 0 | 246 | 6 |

== Honours ==
Braga

- Taça da Liga: 2023–24
