= 2014–15 Villarreal CF season =

Villarreal
2014–15 season
- President: Fernando Roig
- Head coach: Marcelino
- Stadium: El Madrigal
- La Liga: 6th
- Copa del Rey: Semi-finals
- UEFA Europa League: Round of 16
- Top goalscorer: League: Luciano Vietto (12); All: Luciano Vietto (20)
| Home colours | Away colours | Third colours |

The 2014–15 season was Villarreal Club de Fútbol's 92nd season in existence and the club's 2nd consecutive season in the top flight of Spanish football. In addition to the domestic league, Villarreal participated in this season's editions of the Copa del Rey and the UEFA Europa League. The season covered the period from 1 July 2014 to 30 June 2015.

== Squad ==
As of June 2014..

=== Squad and statistics ===
| No. | Pos | Nat | Player | Total | | Liga | | Copa | |
| No. | Pos | Nat | Player | Apps | Goals | Apps | Goals | Apps | Goals |
|---|---|---|---|---|---|---|---|---|---|
| 1 | GK | (Spain) ESP | Sergio Asenjo | 40 | 0 | 34 | 0 | 6 | 0 |
| 2 | DF | (Spain) ESP | Mario | 40 | 3 | 34 | 3 | 6 | 0 |
| 3 | DF | (Slovenia) SLO | Bojan Jokić | 7 | 0 | 7 | 0 | 0 | 0 |
| 4 | MF | (Spain) ESP | Tomás Pina | 30 | 0 | 22 | 0 | 8 | 0 |
| 5 | DF | (Argentina) ARG | Mateo Musacchio | 17 | 3 | 14 | 3 | 3 | 0 |
| 6 | MF | (Mexico) MEX | Jonathan dos Santos | 14 | 1 | 14 | 1 | 0 | 0 |
| 7 | FW | (Argentina) ARG | Luciano Vietto | 36 | 12 | 32 | 12 | 4 | 0 |
| 8 | FW | (Nigeria) NGR | Ikechukwu Uche | 26 | 6 | 23 | 6 | 3 | 0 |
| 9 | FW | (Mexico) MEX | Giovani dos Santos | 34 | 2 | 27 | 1 | 7 | 1 |
| 10 | MF | (Spain) ESP | Cani | 9 | 0 | 9 | 0 | 0 | 0 |
| 11 | MF | (Paraguay) PAR | Hernán Pérez | 0 | 0 | 0 | 0 | 0 | 0 |
| 14 | MF | (Spain) ESP | Manu Trigueros | 40 | 3 | 33 | 1 | 7 | 2 |
| 15 | DF | (Spain) ESP | Víctor Ruiz | 33 | 0 | 25 | 0 | 8 | 0 |
| 16 | DF | (Spain) ESP | José Dorado | 21 | 0 | 15 | 0 | 6 | 0 |
| 17 | MF | (Russia) RUS | Denis Cheryshev | 32 | 5 | 26 | 4 | 6 | 1 |
| 18 | DF | (Spain) ESP | Jaume Costa | 36 | 1 | 29 | 1 | 7 | 0 |
| 19 | MF | (Spain) ESP | Moi Gómez | 38 | 4 | 31 | 4 | 7 | 0 |
| 20 | DF | (Brazil) BRA | Gabriel | 21 | 0 | 19 | 0 | 2 | 0 |
| 21 | MF | (Spain) ESP | Bruno | 29 | 3 | 24 | 2 | 5 | 1 |
| 22 | DF | (Serbia) SRB | Antonio Rukavina | 28 | 0 | 21 | 0 | 7 | 0 |
| 24 | MF | (Spain) ESP | Javier Espinosa | 8 | 1 | 6 | 1 | 2 | 0 |
| 25 | GK | (Spain) ESP | Juan Carlos | 7 | 0 | 5 | 0 | 2 | 0 |
| - | FW | (Spain) ESP | Jonathan Pereira | 0 | 0 | - | - | - | - |
| - | DF | (Spain) ESP | Pablo Íñiguez | 0 | 0 | - | - | - | - |
| - | DF | (Serbia) SRB | Aleksandar Pantić | 0 | 0 | - | - | - | - |
| - | MF | (Mexico) MEX | Javier Aquino | 0 | 0 | - | - | - | - |

== Competitions ==
=== Overall record ===
| Competition | First match | Last match | Starting round | Final position | Record | | | | | | | |
| Competition | First match | Last match | Starting round | Final position | Pld | W | D | L | GF | GA | GD | Win % |
|---|---|---|---|---|---|---|---|---|---|---|---|---|
| La Liga | 24 August 2014 | 23 May 2015 | Matchday 1 | 6th | 38 | 16 | 12 | 10 | 48 | 37 | +11 | 42.11 |
| Copa del Rey | 4 December 2014 | 4 March 2015 | Round of 32 | Semi-finals | 8 | 5 | 1 | 2 | 12 | 9 | +3 | 62.50 |
| UEFA Europa League | 21 August 2014 | 19 March 2015 | Play-off round | Round of 16 | 12 | 7 | 2 | 3 | 29 | 14 | +15 | 58.33 |
| Total | | | | | 58 | 28 | 15 | 15 | 89 | 60 | +29 | 48.28 |

Source: Competitions

=== La Liga ===
==== League table ====
| Pos | Team | Pld | W | D | L | GF | GA | GD | Pts | Qualification or relegation |
|---|---|---|---|---|---|---|---|---|---|---|
| 4 | Valencia | 38 | 22 | 11 | 5 | 70 | 32 | +38 | 77 | Qualification for the Champions League play-off round |
| 5 | Sevilla | 38 | 23 | 7 | 8 | 71 | 45 | +26 | 76 | Qualification for the Champions League group stage (Note: Sevilla qualified for the Champions League group stage by winning the 2014–15 UEFA Europa League. As a result, the fifth-placed spot for the Europa League group stage they earned was vacated without replacement as per UEFA regulations.) |
| 6 | Villarreal | 38 | 16 | 12 | 10 | 48 | 37 | +11 | 60 | Qualification for the Europa League group stage (Note: Since the winners of the 2014–15 Copa del Rey, Barcelona, qualified for European competition based on league position, the spot awarded to the cup winners (Europa League group stage) was passed to the sixth-placed team, and the spot awarded to the sixth-placed team (Europa League third qualifying round) was passed to the seventh-placed team.) |
| 7 | Athletic Bilbao | 38 | 15 | 10 | 13 | 42 | 41 | +1 | 55 | Qualification for the Europa League third qualifying round |
| 8 | Celta Vigo | 38 | 13 | 12 | 13 | 47 | 44 | +3 | 51 | |

Source: La Liga
Rules for classification: 1) points; 2) head-to-head points; 3) head-to-head goal difference; 4) goal difference; 5) number of goals scored; 6) fair-play points; 7) playoff match

==== Results summary ====
| Overall | | | | | | | | Home | | | | | | Away | | | | | |
| Pld | W | D | L | GF | GA | GD | Pts | W | D | L | GF | GA | GD | W | D | L | GF | GA | GD |
|---|---|---|---|---|---|---|---|---|---|---|---|---|---|---|---|---|---|---|---|
| 38 | 16 | 12 | 10 | 48 | 37 | +11 | 60 | 12 | 1 | 6 | 29 | 17 | +12 | 4 | 11 | 4 | 19 | 20 | −1 |

Source: Competitive matches

==== Results by round ====
| Round | 1 | 2 | 3 | 4 | 5 | 6 | 7 | 8 | 9 | 10 | 11 | 12 | 13 | 14 | 15 | 16 | 17 | 18 | 19 | 20 | 21 | 22 | 23 | 24 | 25 | 26 | 27 | 28 | 29 | 30 | 31 | 32 | 33 | 34 | 35 | 36 | 37 | 38 |
|---|---|---|---|---|---|---|---|---|---|---|---|---|---|---|---|---|---|---|---|---|---|---|---|---|---|---|---|---|---|---|---|---|---|---|---|---|---|---|
| Ground | A | H | A | H | A | H | A | H | A | H | A | H | A | H | A | H | A | A | H | H | A | H | A | H | A | H | A | H | A | H | A | H | A | H | A | H | H | A |
| Result | W | L | D | W | D | L | W | W | L | L | D | W | W | W | W | W | D | D | W | W | L | W | L | W | D | W | D | L | D | L | D | D | D | L | D | W | W | L |
| Position | 4 | 8 | 5 | 5 | 7 | 7 | 7 | 6 | 8 | 8 | 8 | 8 | 6 | 6 | 6 | 5 | 6 | 6 | 6 | 6 | 6 | 6 | 6 | 6 | 6 | 6 | 6 | 6 | 6 | 6 | 6 | 6 | 6 | 6 | 6 | 6 | 6 | 6 |

Source: Competitive matches
A = Away; H = Home; W = Win; D = Draw; L = Loss

==== Matches ====
Win Draw Loss

| 24 August 2014 1 | Levante | 0–2 | Villarreal | Valencia |
| 23:00 CEST (UTC+2) | López (yellow card) 84' | Report | Costa (yellow card) 47'; Uche (yellow card) 52', (goal) 56'; G. Dos Santos (yellow card) 74'; Cheryshev 85' | Stadium: Ciutat de València; Attendance: 19,000; Referee: David Fernández Borbalán |

| 31 August 2014 2 | Villarreal | 0–1 | Barcelona | Villarreal |
| 19:00 CEST (UTC+2) | | Report | Pedro (yellow card) 37'; Alves (yellow card) 42'; Sandro 82' | Stadium: El Madrigal; Attendance: 21,200; Referee: Carlos Velasco Carballo |

| 14 September 2014 3 | Granada | 0–0 | Villarreal | Granada |
| 21:00 CEST (UTC+2) | Machís (yellow card) 60'; Córdoba (yellow card) 87'; Nyom (yellow card) 90+3' | Report | Vietto (yellow card) 71'; Trigueros (yellow card) 78' | Stadium: Nuevo Los Cármenes; Attendance: 21,000; Referee: Carlos del Cerro Grande |

| 21 September 2014 4 | Villarreal | 4–2 | Rayo Vallecano | Villarreal |
| 17:00 CEST (UTC+2) | Espinosa (yellow card) 31', (goal) 33'; Musacchio 62'; Rukavina (yellow card) 73'; Vietto 74', 87' | Report | Kakuta 22'; Bueno 29', (yellow card) 69'; Insúa (yellow card) 77' | Stadium: El Madrigal; Attendance: 15,050; Referee: Eduardo Prieto Iglesias |

| 24 September 2014 5 | Eibar | 1–1 | Villarreal | Eibar |
| 20:00 CEST (UTC+2) | Arruabarrena 8'; Nieto (yellow card) 28'; Minero (yellow card) 34'; Lillo (yellow card) 70'; Albentosa (yellow card) 90+1' | Report | Pina (yellow card) 8'; Gabriel (yellow card) 28'; Cheryshev (yellow card) 50'; Gerard 71'; Gómez (yellow card) 83' | Stadium: Ipurua; Attendance: 4,231; Referee: Fernando Teixeira Vitienes |

| 27 September 2014 6 | Villarreal | 0–2 | Real Madrid | Villarreal |
| 16:00 CEST (UTC+2) | | Report | Modrić 32'; Ramos (yellow card) 38'; Ronaldo 40' | Stadium: El Madrigal; Attendance: 22,146; Referee: Alberto Undiano Mallenco |

| 5 October 2014 7 | Celta Vigo | 1–3 | Villarreal | Vigo |
| 17:00 CEST (UTC+2) | Fontàs (yellow card) 26' (yellow-red card) 86'; Larrivey 44'; Krohn-Dehli (yellow card) 70'; Orellana (yellow card) 83'; Madinda (yellow card) 89' | Report | Gómez 32', 33', (yellow card) 57'; Marín (yellow card) 35'; Gabriel (yellow card) 50'; Cani (yellow card) 90'; Mario 90+1' | Stadium: Balaídos; Attendance: 23,000; Referee: Alfonso Álvarez Izquierdo |

| 19 October 2014 8 | Villarreal | 2–0 | Almería | Villarreal |
| 21:00 CEST (UTC+2) | Uche 23', 59'; Costa (yellow card) 26'; Trigueros (yellow card) 39'; Gabriel (yellow card) 56'; Mario (yellow card) 74'; Cheryshev (yellow card) 75' | Report | Azeez (yellow card) 30'; Verza (yellow card) 80' | Stadium: El Madrigal; Attendance: 19,000; Referee: Carlos Clos Gómez |

| 26 October 2014 9 | Sevilla | 2–1 | Villarreal | Seville |
| 19:00 CEST (UTC+2) | Carriço (yellow card) 9'; Trémoulinas (yellow card) 64'; Mbia (yellow card) 73'; Suárez 88'; Bacca 90+3' (pen.) | Report | Cheryshev (yellow card) 21'; Gómez (yellow card) 27'; Mario (yellow card) 67'; Vietto 79'; G. Dos Santos (yellow card) 85' | Stadium: Ramón Sánchez Pizjuán; Attendance: 34,500; Referee: Alejandro Hernández Hernández |

| 2 November 2014 10 | Villarreal | 1–3 | Valencia | Villarreal |
| 17:00 CET (UTC+1) | Mario (yellow card) 54'; Dorado (yellow card) 72'; Trigueros 88' | Report | Trigueros 6' (o.g.); Otamendi (yellow card) 47'; Rodrigo (yellow card) 60'; Mustafi 64', 73'; Gayà (yellow card) 80' | Stadium: El Madrigal; Attendance: 23,000; Referee: Pedro Pérez Montero |

| 9 November 2014 11 | Espanyol | 1–1 | Villarreal | Cornellà de Llobregat |
| 17:00 CET (UTC+1) | Álvarez (yellow card) 16'; García (yellow card) 83'; Stuani (yellow card) 83'; Colotto 90' | Report | Mario 26'; Trigueros (yellow card) 36'; Cheryshev (yellow card) 43'; Costa (yellow card) 51' | Stadium: Cornellà-El Prat; Attendance: 22,000; Referee: Jesús Gil Manzano |

| 23 November 2014 12 | Villarreal | 2–1 | Getafe | Villarreal |
| 21:00 CET (UTC+1) | Mario 38'; Gerard 43' | Report | Lacen 61' | Stadium: El Madrigal; Attendance: 19,500; Referee: Santiago Jaime Latre |

| 30 November 2014 13 | Córdoba | 0–2 | Villarreal | Córdoba |
| 19:00 CET (UTC+1) | | Report | Vietto 24'; Uche 71' | Stadium: Nuevo Arcángel; Attendance: 15,998; Referee: Xavier Estrada Fernández |

| 7 December 2014 14 | Villarreal | 4–0 | Real Sociedad | Villarreal |
| 19:00 CET (UTC+1) | Vietto (yellow card) 41'; Costa (yellow card) 48'; Bruno 63'; Cheryshev 73'; Gómez 80', 86' | Report | De la Bella (yellow card) 35'; I. Martínez (yellow card) 67' | Stadium: El Madrigal; Attendance: 16,000; Referee: Fernando Teixeira Vitienes |

| 14 December 2014 15 | Atlético Madrid | 0–1 | Villarreal | Madrid |
| 19:00 CET (UTC+1) | Turan (yellow card) 28'; Mandžukić (yellow card) 41'; Juanfran (yellow card) 44'; Koke (yellow card) 88' | Report | Uche (yellow card) 17'; J. Dos Santos (yellow card) 41'; Trigueros (yellow card) 55'; Vietto 84' | Stadium: Vicente Calderón; Attendance: 37,000; Referee: Pedro Pérez Montero |

| 21 December 2014 16 | Villarreal | 3–0 | Deportivo La Coruña | Villarreal |
| 12:00 CET (UTC+1) | J. Dos Santos 10'; Vietto 68', 73'; Bruno (yellow card) 75'; Pina (red card) 80' | Report | Sidnei (yellow card) 56'; Toché (yellow card) 61'; Lopo (yellow card) 70' | Stadium: El Madrigal; Attendance: 16,000; Referee: José González González |

| 3 January 2015 17 | Elche | 2–2 | Villarreal | Elche |
| 20:00 CET (UTC+1) | Jonathas 26', (yellow card) 38'; Pašalić (yellow card) 29'; Rodríguez 35'; Pelegrín (yellow card) 48'; Cisma (yellow card) 74' | Report | Ruiz (yellow card) 7'; Vietto 12'; Uche 17'; Costa (yellow card) 49' | Stadium: Manuel Martínez Valero; Attendance: 18,283; Referee: Carlos Clos Gómez |

| 10 January 2015 18 | Málaga | 1–1 | Villarreal | Málaga |
| 18:00 CET (UTC+1) | Samu (yellow card) 50'; Angeleri (yellow card) 55'; Duda (yellow card) 59'; Amrabat 60'; Torres (yellow card) 71' | Report | Cheryshev (yellow card) 10'; Ruiz (yellow card) 29'; Trigueros (yellow card) 36'; J. Dos Santos 45+1'; Gabriel (yellow card) 84' | Stadium: La Rosaleda; Attendance: 23,500; Referee: Santiago Jaime Latre |

| 17 January 2015 19 | Villarreal | 2–0 | Athletic Bilbao | Villarreal |
| 20:00 CET (UTC+1) | Cheryshev 42', (yellow card) 77'; Bruno (yellow card) 56', (goal) 83' (pen.) | Report | Etxeita (yellow card) 54'; San José (yellow card) 76' | Stadium: El Madrigal; Attendance: 19,300; Referee: Xavier Estrada Fernández |

| 24 January 2015 20 | Villarreal | 1–0 | Levante | Villarreal |
| 22:00 CET (UTC+1) | Vietto 56' | Report | Vyntra (yellow card) 29'; El Zhar (yellow card) 75'; Camarasa (yellow card) 88' | Stadium: El Madrigal; Attendance: 11,000; Referee: David Fernández Borbalán |

| 1 February 2015 21 | Barcelona | 3–2 | Villarreal | Barcelona |
| 21:00 CET (UTC+1) | Neymar 45'; Rafinha 53', (yellow card) 63'; Messi 55' | Report | Bruno (yellow card) 23'; Cheryshev 30'; J. Dos Santos (yellow card) 41'; Vietto 51' | Stadium: Camp Nou; Attendance: 60,000; Referee: Iñaki Vicandi Garrido |

| 7 February 2015 22 | Villarreal | 2–0 | Granada | Villarreal |
| 18:00 CET (UTC+1) | Musacchio 30'; Dorado (yellow card) 76'; J. Dos Santos (yellow card) 87'; Gerard 90+2' | Report | Pérez (yellow card) 82' | Stadium: El Madrigal; Attendance: 12,419; Referee: Alberto Undiano Mallenco |

| 15 February 2015 23 | Rayo Vallecano | 2–0 | Villarreal | Madrid |
| 19:00 CET (UTC+1) | Fatau (yellow card) 44'; Bueno 51'; Kakuta 69'; Amaya (yellow card) 72' | Report | Pina (yellow card) 36'; Campbell (yellow card) 82' | Stadium: Campo de Vallecas; Attendance: 10,914; Referee: Pedro Pérez Montero |

| 22 February 2015 24 | Villarreal | 1–0 | Eibar | Villarreal |
| 19:00 CET (UTC+1) | Vietto 71'; Costa (yellow card) 89'; Rukavina (yellow card) 90+2' | Report | | Stadium: El Madrigal; Attendance: 18,500; Referee: Mario Melero López |

| 1 March 2015 25 | Real Madrid | 1–1 | Villarreal | Madrid |
| 21:00 CET (UTC+1) | Ronaldo 52' (pen.) | Report | Gerard 64' | Stadium: Santiago Bernabéu; Attendance: 75,108; Referee: José González González |

| 8 March 2015 26 | Villarreal | 4–1 | Celta Vigo | Villarreal |
| 19:00 CET (UTC+1) | G. Dos Santos 41'; Musacchio 45+1'; Vietto 73'; Gerard 84' | Report | Fernández 50'; Nolito (yellow card) 75'; Fontàs (yellow card) 77' | Stadium: El Madrigal; Attendance: 14,366; Referee: Carlos Clos Gómez |

| 15 March 2015 27 | Almería | 0–0 | Villarreal | Almería |
| 12:00 CET (UTC+1) | Mauro (yellow card) 32' (red card) 40'; Corona (yellow card) 34'; Vélez (yellow card) 64'; Verza (yellow card) 78' | Report | Rukavina (yellow card) 15'; Dorado (yellow card) 23'; Costa (yellow card) 37' (yellow-red card) 55'; Gerard (yellow card) 54'; Pina (yellow card) 85' | Stadium: Mediterráneo; Attendance: 14,000; Referee: Alberto Undiano Mallenco |

| 22 March 2015 28 | Villarreal | 0–2 | Sevilla | Villarreal |
| 17:00 CET (UTC+1) | Gómez (yellow card) 67'; Musacchio (yellow card) 77' | Report | Coke 49'; Vitolo 65'; Navarro (yellow card) 74' | Stadium: El Madrigal; Attendance: 7,500; Referee: Alejandro Hernández Hernández |

| 5 April 2015 29 | Valencia | 0–0 | Villarreal | Valencia |
| 17:00 CEST (UTC+2) | Parejo (yellow card) 38'; Otamendi (yellow card) 89' | Report | Mario (yellow card) 21'; Vietto (yellow card) 31'; Bailly (yellow card) 87' | Stadium: Mestalla; Attendance: 49,545; Referee: Mario Melero López |

| 9 April 2015 30 | Villarreal | 0–3 | Espanyol | Villarreal |
| 22:00 CEST (UTC+2) | Pina (yellow card) 34' | Report | Caicedo 24', 68'; Álvaro (yellow card) 34'; Sánchez 79' | Stadium: El Madrigal; Attendance: 20,000; Referee: Carlos del Cerro Grande |

| 12 April 2015 31 | Getafe | 1–1 | Villarreal | Getafe |
| 12:00 CEST (UTC+2) | Rodríguez (yellow card) 61'; Castro 64'; Naldo (yellow card) 82' | Report | Trigueros (yellow card) 26'; Bailly (yellow card) 39'; Uche 52' (pen.); Rukavina (yellow card) 56'; Musacchio (yellow card) 65'; G. Dos Santos (yellow card) 70'; Costa (yellow card) 78' | Stadium: Coliseum Alfonso Pérez; Attendance: 6,000; Referee: José Teixeira Vitienes |

| 19 April 2015 32 | Villarreal | 0–0 | Córdoba | Villarreal |
| 19:00 CEST (UTC+2) | Bailly (yellow card) 90+2' | Report | Crespo (yellow card) 18'; Abel (yellow card) 86'; Héldon (yellow card) 87'; Gunino (yellow card) 90+3' | Stadium: El Madrigal; Attendance: 23,000; Referee: Ignacio Iglesias Prieto |

| 25 April 2015 33 | Real Sociedad | 0–0 | Villarreal | San Sebastián |
| 22:00 CEST (UTC+2) | González (yellow card) 81' | Report | J. Dos Santos (yellow card) 45+1'; Ruiz (yellow card) 46'; Trigueros (yellow card) 58'; Juan Carlos (yellow card) 72' | Stadium: Anoeta; Attendance: 17,073; Referee: Jesús Gil Fernández |

| 29 April 2015 34 | Villarreal | 0–1 | Atlético Madrid | Villarreal |
| 22:00 CEST (UTC+2) | | Report | Gabi (yellow card) 41'; Gámez (yellow card) 55'; Torres 74'; Oblak (yellow card) 77'; Miranda (yellow card) 87'; Juanfran (yellow card) 89' | Stadium: El Madrigal; Attendance: 18,800; Referee: José González González |

| 2 May 2015 35 | Deportivo La Coruña | 1–1 | Villarreal | A Coruña |
| 22:00 CEST (UTC+2) | Borges 50'; Riera (yellow card) 68' | Report | Mario (yellow card) 39'; Bailly (yellow card) 45'; Costa 48'; Jokić (yellow card) 62'; Ruiz (yellow card) 74'; Gómez (yellow card) 80' | Stadium: Riazor; Attendance: 20,817; Referee: Alejandro Hernández Hernández |

| 10 May 2015 36 | Villarreal | 1–0 | Elche | Villarreal |
| 17:00 CEST (UTC+2) | Campbell 26'; Trigueros (yellow card) 66' | Report | Jonathas (yellow card) 25'; Roco (yellow card) 90+4' | Stadium: El Madrigal; Attendance: 13,500; Referee: Carlos del Cerro Grande |

| 17 May 2015 37 | Villarreal | 2–1 | Málaga | Villarreal |
| 19:00 CEST (UTC+2) | G. Dos Santos (yellow card) 69'; Vietto (yellow card) 73'; Gerard 82', 87'; Rukavina (yellow card) 86' | Report | Darder (yellow card) 76', (goal) 90' | Stadium: El Madrigal; Attendance: 15,000; Referee: Carlos Velasco Carballo |

| 23 May 2015 38 | Athletic Bilbao | 4–0 | Villarreal | Bilbao |
| 18:30 CEST (UTC+2) | Aduriz 25' (pen.), 60'; Iraola 28'; Beñat 36' | Report | Jokić (yellow card) 24' | Stadium: San Mamés; Attendance: 43,276; Referee: Eduardo Prieto Iglesias |

=== Copa del Rey ===
==== Round of 32 ====
| 4 December 2014 First leg | Cádiz | 1–2 | Villarreal | Cádiz |
| 20:00 CET (UTC+1) | Josete (yellow card) 22'; Arregi 47', (yellow card) 63'; Airam (yellow card) 50'; Sánchez (yellow card) 85' | Report | Gerard 17'; Matías Nahuel 21'; Puerto (yellow card) 54'; Marín (red card) 58' | Stadium: Ramón de Carranza; Attendance: 12,000; Referee: Ignacio Iglesias Prieto |

| 17 December 2014 Second leg | Villarreal | 3–0 (5–1 agg.) | Cádiz | Villarreal |
| 22:00 CET (UTC+1) | Trigueros 55' (pen.); Gerard 78', 88' | Report | | Stadium: El Madrigal; Referee: Iñaki Vicandi Garrido |

==== Round of 16 ====
| 7 January 2015 First leg | Villarreal | 1–0 | Real Sociedad | Villarreal |
| 20:00 CET (UTC+1) | Costa (yellow card) 14'; Cheryshev 72' | Report | Berchiche (yellow card) 76'; Canales (yellow card) 85' | Stadium: El Madrigal; Attendance: 12,000; Referee: Jesús Gil Fernández |

| 14 January 2015 Second leg | Real Sociedad | 2–2 (2–3 agg.) | Villarreal | San Sebastián |
| 20:00 CET (UTC+1) | Pardo (yellow card) 14'; Vela 45', (yellow card) 56'; I. Martínez (yellow card) 50'; Berchiche (yellow card) 50'; Granero 74' | Report | Musacchio (yellow card) 20' (yellow-red card) 82'; Gerard 26', (yellow card) 70'; Matías Nahuel (yellow card) 62'; G. Dos Santos (yellow card) 70', (goal) 72'; Cheryshev (yellow card) 89' | Stadium: Anoeta; Attendance: 17,000; Referee: Carlos Velasco Carballo |

==== Quarter-finals ====
| 21 January 2015 First leg | Villarreal | 1–0 | Getafe | Villarreal |
| 20:00 CET (UTC+1) | Bruno 85' | Report | Felip (yellow card) 42'; J. Rodríguez (yellow card) 43' | Stadium: El Madrigal; Attendance: 14,000; Referee: Alejandro Hernández Hernández |

| 29 January 2015 Second leg | Getafe | 0–1 (0–2 agg.) | Villarreal | Getafe |
| 20:00 CET (UTC+1) | Pedro León (yellow card) 67' | Report | Rukavina (yellow card) 33'; Asenjo (yellow card) 61'; Gerard 78'; Cheryshev (yellow card) 89' | Stadium: Coliseum Alfonso Pérez; Attendance: 2,800; Referee: Fernando Teixeira Vitienes |

==== Semi-finals ====
| 11 February 2015 First leg | Barcelona | 3–1 | Villarreal | Barcelona |
| 20:00 CET (UTC+1) | Messi 41'; Iniesta 49'; Piqué 64'; Suárez (yellow card) 86' | Report | Trigueros 48'; Pina (yellow card) 66'; Ruiz (yellow card) 70'; Musacchio (yellow card) 70' | Stadium: Camp Nou; Attendance: 57,000; Referee: Alejandro Hernández Hernández |

| 4 March 2015 Second leg | Villarreal | 1–3 (2–6 agg.) | Barcelona | Villarreal |
| 21:00 CET (UTC+1) | J. Dos Santos (yellow card) 36', (goal) 39'; Cheryshev (yellow card) 38'; Pina (red card) 65'; Campbell (yellow card) 82' | Report | Neymar 3', 88'; Piqué (yellow card) 50'; Suárez 73' | Stadium: El Madrigal; Attendance: 23,600; Referee: David Fernández Borbalán |

=== UEFA Europa League ===
==== Play-off round ====
| 21 August 2014 First leg | Astana (Kazakhstan) | 0–3 | (Spain) Villarreal | Astana, Kazakhstan |
| 18:00 CEST (UTC+2) | Postnikov (yellow card) 20'; Aničić (yellow card) 26' (red card) 60' | Report | Cani 33'; G. Dos Santos 48'; Costa (yellow card) 55'; Mario 84' | Stadium: Astana Arena; Attendance: 27,500; Referee: Bas Nijhuis (Netherlands) |

| 28 August 2014 Second leg | Villarreal (Spain) | 4–0 (7–0 agg.) | (Kazakhstan) Astana | Villarreal, Spain |
| 20:45 CEST (UTC+2) | Vietto 21', 54'; Pina (yellow card) 30'; Bruno 61' (pen.); Matías Nahuel 67' | Report | Dzholchiev (yellow card) 18'; Shomko (yellow card) 37'; Twumasi (yellow card) 60' | Stadium: El Madrigal; Attendance: 11,564; Referee: Liran Liany (Israel) |

==== Group stage ====
| Pos | Team | Pld | W | D | L | GF | GA | GD | Pts | Qualification |
|---|---|---|---|---|---|---|---|---|---|---|
| 1 | (Germany) Borussia Mönchengladbach | 6 | 3 | 3 | 0 | 14 | 4 | +10 | 12 | Advance to knockout phase |
| 2 | (Spain) Villarreal | 6 | 3 | 2 | 1 | 15 | 7 | +8 | 11 | Advance to knockout phase |
| 3 | (Switzerland) Zürich | 6 | 2 | 1 | 3 | 10 | 14 | −4 | 7 | |
| 4 | (Cyprus) Apollon Limassol | 6 | 1 | 0 | 5 | 4 | 18 | −14 | 3 | |

Source: Soccerway
Rules for classification: Group stage tiebreakers

| 18 September 2014 1 | Borussia Mönchengladbach (Germany) | 1–1 | (Spain) Villarreal | Mönchengladbach, Germany |
| 19:00 CEST (UTC+2) | Herrmann 21' | Report | Pina (yellow card) 19'; Uche 68' | Stadium: Borussia-Park; Referee: Ivan Kružliak (Slovakia) |

| 2 October 2014 2 | Villarreal (Spain) | 4–0 | (Cyprus) Apollon Limassol | Villarreal, Spain |
| 21:05 CEST (UTC+2) | Gerard 8', 82'; Espinosa 44', 51' | Report | | Stadium: El Madrigal; Attendance: 12,630; Referee: Arnold Hunter (Northern Ireland) |

| 23 October 2014 3 | Villarreal (Spain) | 4–1 | (Switzerland) Zürich | Villarreal, Spain |
| 21:05 CEST (UTC+2) | Cani 6'; Vietto 57'; Bruno 60', (yellow card) 63'; G. Dos Santos 78' | Report | Schönbächler 43'; Kukeli (yellow card) 51'; Etoundi (yellow card) 76' | Stadium: El Madrigal; Attendance: 14,092; Referee: Halis Özkahya (Turkey) |

| 6 November 2014 4 | Zürich (Switzerland) | 3–2 | (Spain) Villarreal | Zürich, Switzerland |
| 19:00 CET (UTC+1) | Etoundi 21'; Djimsiti 26'; Chikhaoui 29'; Rossini (yellow card) 90+2' | Report | J. Dos Santos (yellow card) 15'; Pina 19'; Gerard 24' | Stadium: Letzigrund; Attendance: 2,300; Referee: Vladislav Bezborodov (Russia) |

| 27 November 2014 5 | Villarreal (Spain) | 2–2 | (Germany) Borussia Mönchengladbach | Villarreal, Spain |
| 21:05 CET (UTC+1) | Vietto 26'; Bruno (yellow card) 39'; Cheryshev 63'; Trigueros (yellow card) 68' | Report | Brouwers (yellow card) 17'; Raffael 55'; Xhaka 67', (yellow card) 77' | Stadium: El Madrigal; Attendance: 16,000; Referee: Szymon Marciniak (Poland) |

| 11 December 2014 6 | Apollon Limassol (Cyprus) | 0–2 | (Spain) Villarreal | Nicosia, Cyprus |
| 19:00 CET (UTC+1) | Rezek (yellow card) 81' | Report | Rukavina (yellow card) 21'; Gerard 35'; Vietto 40'; Uche (yellow card) 69'; Costa (yellow card) 71' | Stadium: GSP Stadium; Attendance: 4,200; Referee: Serge Gumienny (Germany) |

==== Knockout phase ====
===== Round of 32 =====
| 19 February 2015 First leg | Villarreal (Spain) | 2–1 | (Austria) Red Bull Salzburg | Villarreal, Spain |
| 21:05 CET (UTC+1) | Uche 32'; Pina (yellow card) 38'; Cheryshev 54'; Campbell (yellow card) 84'; Costa (yellow card) 90+2' | Report | Ilsanker (yellow card) 18'; Soriano 48' (pen.); Schwegler (yellow card) 53'; Ramalho (yellow card) 75' | Stadium: El Madrigal; Attendance: 16,000; Referee: Bobby Madden (Scotland) |

| 26 February 2015 Second leg | Red Bull Salzburg (Austria) | 1–3 (2–5 agg.) | (Spain) Villarreal | Salzburg, Austria |
| 19:00 CET (UTC+1) | Djuricin 18'; Hinteregger (yellow card) 49'; Shwegler (yellow card) 66' | Report | Vietto 33', 76'; Musacchio (yellow card) 33'; Pina (yellow card) 34'; Trigueros (yellow card) 56'; G. Dos Santos 79'; J. Dos Santos (yellow card) 85' | Stadium: Red Bull Arena; Attendance: 26,020 |

===== Round of 16 =====
| 12 March 2015 First leg | Villarreal (Spain) | 1–3 | (Spain) Sevilla | Villarreal, Spain |
| 21:05 CET (UTC+1) | Costa (yellow card) 20'; Gómez (yellow card) 35'; Vietto 48'; Campbell (yellow card) 66' | Report | Vitolo 1'; Krychowiak (yellow card) 9'; Mbia 26'; Gameiro 50'; Vidal (yellow card) 90+2' | Stadium: El Madrigal; Attendance: 19,930; Referee: Daniele Orsato (Italy) |

| 19 March 2015 Second leg | Sevilla (Spain) | 2–1 (5–2 agg.) | (Spain) Villarreal | Seville, Spain |
| 21:05 CET (UTC+1) | Iborra 69'; Suárez 83' | Report | Vietto (yellow card) 22'; Bailly (yellow card) 29' (yellow-red card) 77'; Pina (yellow card) 58'; Musacchio (yellow card) 66'; G. Dos Santos 73'; Mario (yellow card) 84' | Stadium: Ramón Sánchez Pizjuán; Attendance: 35,000; Referee: Martin Atkinson (England) |
