= Đorđe Lazić (footballer) =

Serbian footballer

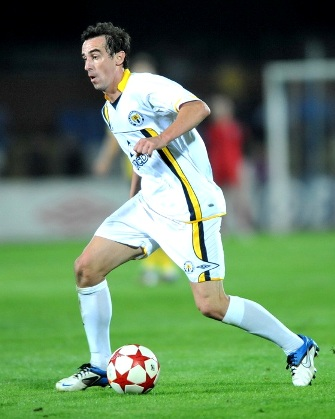
- Lazić with Metalurh Donetsk in 2011

Personal information
- Full name: Đorđe Lazić
- Date of birth: 18 June 1983 (age 43)
- Place of birth: Valjevo, SFR Yugoslavia
- Height: 1.81 m (5 ft 11 1/2 in)
- Position: Attacking midfielder

Youth career
- Budućnost Valjevo

Senior career*
Years	Team	Apps	(Gls)
2001–2005	Budućnost Valjevo	48	(3)
2002	→ Remont Čačak (loan)	3	(0)
2005–2007	Mladost Lučani	35	(12)
2007–2008	Partizan	56	(7)
2009–2015	Metalurh Donetsk	155	(21)
2016	Stal Dniprodzerzhynsk	8	(2)
2016–2017	Xanthi	26	(3)
2018	Mladost Lučani	2	(0)

Managerial career
- 2022: Budućnost Krušik 2014 (assistant)
- 2022: Budućnost Krušik 2014
- 2022–2023: Sloga Bajina Bašta
- 2024–2025: Budućnost Krušik 2014 (youth)
- 2025–: Partizan (youth)
- * Club domestic league appearances and goals as of 1 December 2018

Đorđe Lazić (Serbian Cyrillic: Ђорђе Лазић; born 18 June 1983) is a Serbian retired footballer who plays as an attacking midfielder.

== Club career ==
Lazić started out at his hometown club Budućnost Valjevo. He also played for Remont Čačak and Mladost Lučani, before joining Partizan in the 2007 winter transfer window. With the Crno-beli, Lazić won the double in the 2007–08 season.

In the winter of 2009, Lazić went abroad to Ukraine and signed with Metalurh Donetsk. He spent the following six and a half years there, before the club folded in July 2015. After being without a club for six months, Lazić joined fellow Ukrainian Premier League club Stal Dniprodzerzhynsk until the end of the season.

In the summer of 2016, Lazić moved to Greece and signed for Xanthi. He spent one year with the club, making 26 league appearances and scoring three goals.

In the 2018 winter transfer window, Lazić returned to his homeland Serbia and joined his former club Mladost Lučani.

== International career ==
In November 2007, Lazić was called up to the Serbia national team by manager Javier Clemente for their rescheduled UEFA Euro 2008 qualifier at home against Kazakhstan, but failed to make his debut.

== Statistics ==
Club	Season	League		Cup		Super Cup		Continental		Total	
Club	Season	Apps	Goals	Apps	Goals	Apps	Goals	Apps	Goals	Apps	Goals
Partizan	2006–07	15	1	2	0	—		0	0	17	1
Partizan	2007–08	30	6	4	1	—		1	0	35	7
Partizan	2008–09	11	0	1	0	—		9	0	21	0
Partizan	Total	56	7	7	1	—		10	0	73	8
Metalurh Donetsk	2008–09	7	0	0	0	—		—		7	0
Metalurh Donetsk	2009–10	23	1	3	1	—		6	0	32	2
Metalurh Donetsk	2010–11	29	4	1	0	—		—		30	4
Metalurh Donetsk	2011–12	28	2	4	0	—		—		32	2
Metalurh Donetsk	2012–13	20	0	1	0	1	0	4	0	26	0
Metalurh Donetsk	2013–14	26	5	0	0	—		2	0	28	5
Metalurh Donetsk	2014–15	22	9	1	0	—		—		23	9
Metalurh Donetsk	Total	155	21	10	1	1	0	12	0	178	22
Stal Dniprodzerzhynsk	2015–16	8	2	2	0	—		—		10	2
Xanthi	2016–17	26	3	7	2	—		—		33	5
Mladost Lučani	2017–18	2	0	0	0	—		0	0	2	0
Career total		247	33	26	4	1	0	22	0	296	37

== Honours ==
Partizan

- Serbian SuperLiga: 2007–08
- Serbian Cup: 2007–08

Metalurh Donetsk

- Ukrainian Cup: Runner-up 2009–10, 2011–12
- Ukrainian Super Cup: Runner-up 2012
