= Dragan Čadikovski =

Serbian-born Macedonian footballer

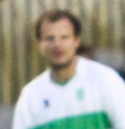
- Čadikovski in 2011

Personal information
- Date of birth: 13 January 1982 (age 44)
- Place of birth: Belgrade, SFR Yugoslavia
- Height: 1.90 m (6 ft 3 in)
- Position: Striker

Youth career
- Kolubara
- Obilić

Senior career*
Years	Team	Apps	(Gls)
2001–2004	Publikum Celje	76	(22)
2005–2007	Zenit St Petersburg	4	(1)
2006–2007	→ Publikum Celje (loan)	21	(7)
2007	Maribor	12	(3)
2008	Partizan	13	(2)
2009–2010	Incheon United	22	(4)
2010	Celje	10	(4)
2011	Rudar Velenje	16	(5)
2011	Olimpija Ljubljana	13	(2)
2012	Koper	11	(5)
2013	Domžale	13	(2)
2013	Celje	13	(2)
2014	Radnički Kragujevac	12	(0)
2014–2015	Kolubara	24	(7)
2015	Velež Mostar	7	(0)
2016	Gleinstätten	8	(5)
2016–2019	Kolubara	62	(14)
2020	TEK Sloga		
2022	USV Wies		

International career
2004–2005	Macedonia	8	(0)

Managerial career
- 2020–2021: Kolubara (assistant)
- * Club domestic league appearances and goals

Dragan Čadikovski (Macedonian: Драган Чадиковски; born 13 January 1982) is a Serbian-born Macedonian former professional footballer who played as a striker. He also holds Slovenian citizenship.

== Club career ==
After starting out at Kolubara, Čadikovski moved abroad to Slovenia and joined Publikum Celje in the summer of 2001. He spent three and a half seasons at the club, scoring 22 league goals and earning a transfer to Russian club Zenit Saint Petersburg in the 2004–05 winter transfer window.

In January 2008, Čadikovski returned to his country of birth and signed a three-year contract with Partizan. He helped the team win the double in the remainder of the season. A year after joining Partizan, Čadikovski was transferred to K League side Incheon United.

== International career ==
He made his senior debut for Macedonia in a January 2004 friendly match away against China and has earned a total of 8 caps, scoring no goals. His final international was a February 2005 FIFA World Cup qualification match against Andorra in Skopje.

== Coaching career ==
On 13 January 2020, Čadikovski announced his retirement from professional football. Čadikovski, however, continued for FK Kolubara as a youth coach and assistant coach of the clubs first team. During 2020, he also played matches with FK TEK Sloga.

== Statistics ==
As of 5 September 2019

Club	Season	League	
Club	Season	Apps	Goals
Publikum Celje	2001–02	18	4
Publikum Celje	2002–03	26	7
Publikum Celje	2003–04	20	8
Publikum Celje	2004–05	12	3
Zenit Saint Petersburg	2005	4	1
Zenit Saint Petersburg	2006	0	0
Publikum Celje (loan)	2006–07	21	7
Maribor	2007–08	12	3
Partizan	2007–08	7	2
Partizan	2008–09	6	0
Incheon United	2009	18	4
Incheon United	2010	4	0
Celje	2010–11	10	4
Rudar Velenje	2010–11	16	5
Olimpija Ljubljana	2011–12	13	2
Koper	2012–13	11	5
Domžale	2012–13	13	2
Celje	2013–14	13	2
Radnički Kragujevac	2013–14	12	0
Kolubara	2014–15	24	7
Velež Mostar	2015–16	7	0
Gleinstätten	2015–16	8	5
Kolubara	2016–17	20	0
Kolubara	2017–18	23	6
Kolubara	2018–19	19	8
Career total		337	85

== Honours ==
Partizan

- Serbian SuperLiga: 2007–08
- Serbian Cup: 2007–08
