= Ramiro Guerra =

Uruguayan footballer (born 1997)

Personal information
- Full name: Ramiro Guerra Pereyra
- Date of birth: 21 March 1997 (age 29)
- Place of birth: Montevideo, Uruguay
- Height: 1.76 m (5 ft 9 in)
- Position: Midfielder

Youth career
- Villarreal

Senior career*
Years	Team	Apps	(Gls)
2014–2022	Villarreal B	80	(5)
2014–2015	Villarreal C	21	(2)
2017–2022	Villarreal	4	(0)
2018–2019	→ Gimnàstic (loan)	3	(0)

International career
2013	Spain U16	1	(1)
2013	Spain U17	6	(0)
2013–2014	Spain U19	4	(0)
2015	Uruguay U20	9	(0)
- * Club domestic league appearances and goals as of 19:00, 5 February 2020 (UTC)

Ramiro Guerra Pereyra (Spanish pronunciation: [raˈmiɾo 'gera]; born 21 March 1997) is an Uruguayan footballer who plays as a central midfielder.

== Club career ==
Born in Montevideo to a Spanish mother and an Uruguayan father, Guerra moved to Spain before his second birthday, and subsequently joined Villarreal CF's youth setup. He made his senior debut on 3 May 2014 at the age of 17, starting in a 1–2 Segunda División B home loss against Gimnàstic de Tarragona.

Guerra was promoted to the C-team ahead of the 2014–15 campaign, and scored his first senior goal on 7 December 2014 in a 2–4 home loss against UD Benigànim in the Tercera División. He made his first-team debut on 28 September, starting in a 0–0 away draw against Maccabi Tel Aviv in the season's UEFA Europa League.

Guerra made his La Liga debut on 1 October 2017, coming on as a late substitute for Samu Castillejo in a 3–0 home win against SD Eibar. The following 21 August, he moved to Segunda División side Gimnàstic de Tarragona on loan for the season.

== Career statistics ==
=== Club ===
As of match played 1 February 2020

Appearances and goals by club, season and competition
Club	Season	League			National Cup		Continental		Other		Total	
Club	Season	Division	Apps	Goals	Apps	Goals	Apps	Goals	Apps	Goals	Apps	Goals
Villarreal B	2013–14	Segunda División B	1	0	—		—		—		1	0
Villarreal B	2015–16	Segunda División B	31	3	—		—		2 (Note: Appearance(s) in Promotion Playoffs)	0	33	3
Villarreal B	2016–17	Segunda División B	33	0	—		—		—		33	0
Villarreal B	2017–18	Segunda División B	10	1	—		—		—		10	1
Villarreal B	2019–20	Segunda División B	3	1	—		—		—		3	1
Villarreal B	Total		78	5	0	0	0	0	2	0	80	5
Villarreal	2017–18	La Liga	4	0	2	0	4 (Note: Appearance(s) in UEFA Europa League)	0	—		10	0
Gimnàstic (loan)	2018–19	Segunda División	3	0	0	0	—		—		3	0
Career total			85	5	2	0	4	0	2	0	93	5
