= Žarko Lazetić =

Serbian football manager and player

Žarko Lazetić Жарко Лазетић
Personal information
- Date of birth: 22 February 1982 (age 44)
- Place of birth: Titova Mitrovica, SFR Yugoslavia
- Height: 1.84 m (6 ft 0 in)
- Position: Forward

Youth career
- Red Star Belgrade
- Obilić

Senior career*
| Years | Team | Apps | (Gls) |
| 2001 | Mladi Obilić | | |
| 2002 | Kneževac | | |
| 2002–2004 | Beograd | 59 | (26) |
| 2004–2006 | Bežanija | 79 | (38) |
| 2007–2008 | Partizan | 28 | (4) |
| 2008–2009 | Vojvodina | 20 | (1) |
| 2009–2010 | Rodos | 30 | (9) |
| 2011 | Persis Solo | | |
| 2012 | Javor Ivanjica | 6 | (1) |
| 2013 | Bežanija | 8 | (1) |
| Total | | 230 | (80) |

Managerial career
- 2014: Srem Jakovo
- 2015: Teleoptik (assistant)
- 2015–2016: Partizan (assistant)
- 2016–2018: Partizan (youth)
- 2018–2019: Partizan (assistant)
- 2019: Partizan (caretaker)
- 2019: Teleoptik
- 2020–2021: Metalac Gornji Milanovac
- 2021–2024: TSC
- 2024–2026: Maccabi Tel Aviv
- 2026: Al Taawoun
- * Club domestic league appearances and goals

Žarko Lazetić (Serbian Cyrillic: Жарко Лазетић; born 22 February 1982) is a Serbian football manager.

== Playing career ==
Throughout his career, Lazetić played as a forward. In December 2006, it was announced that Lazetić had agreed to join Partizan from Bežanija in the January transfer window, along with his teammate Antonio Rukavina. The duo later signed four-year deals with Lazetić being assigned the number 10 shirt. He spent one and a half seasons with the Crno-beli, collecting the double in the 2007–08 campaign.

In July 2008, Lazetić signed a two-year contract with Vojvodina. He stayed at the Stadion Karađorđe for one year, before going abroad and joining Greek club Rodos. He scored nine goals in the 2009–10 Beta Ethniki, but failed to help the side avoid relegation.

In early 2011, Lazetić moved to Indonesia to play for Persis Solo under his compatriot Branko Babić. He subsequently returned to Serbia, having brief spells with Javor Ivanjica and Bežanija, before retiring from the game in the summer of 2013.

== Managerial career ==
Lazetić started his managerial career at Srem Jakovo of the Serbian League Belgrade in the summer of 2014. He would become an assistant to newly appointed Teleoptik manager Ivan Tomić in October 2015, alongside Dražen Bolić. The trio performed the same roles at Partizan between December 2015 and July 2016 when Tomić resigned from his position due to poor results. In October 2016, Lazetić took charge of the Partizan youth team with Bolić serving as his assistant. They won the league title in May 2017. In June 2018, Lazetić joined Miroslav Đukić's staff as an assistant at Partizan, replacing departed Andrija Delibašić. He also served as caretaker manager for the club in March 2019. The following month, Lazetić returned to Teleoptik as manager.

In June 2020, Lazetić was appointed as manager of Serbian SuperLiga club Metalac Gornji Milanovac. He left them in November 2021 to take over at TSC.

In June 2024, Lazetić left TSC and joined Maccabi Tel Aviv of the Israeli Premier League. In January 2026, Lazetić was fired from Maccabi Tel Aviv following their loss in the Tel Aviv derby, and previous poor results.

In July 2026, Lazetić was appointed as head coach of Saudi Pro League club Al-Taawoun ahead of the 2026–27 season. On September 12, 2026 Lazetić was released from coaching Al-Taawoun after loosing 6-0 to Al-Hilal.

== Personal life ==
Lazetić is the younger brother of fellow footballer Nikola Lazetić.

== Managerial statistics ==
As of match played 12 September 2026

Managerial record by team and tenure
| Team | From | To | Record | | | | |
| Team | From | To | G | W | D | L | Win % |
|---|---|---|---|---|---|---|---|
| Partizan | 11 March 2019 | 28 March 2019 | 2 | 1 | 0 | 1 | 50.00 |
| Teleoptik | 4 April 2019 | 10 October 2019 | 7 | 2 | 1 | 4 | 28.57 |
| Metalac Gornji Milanovac | 7 July 2020 | 11 November 2021 | 59 | 19 | 17 | 23 | 32.20 |
| TSC | 29 November 2021 | 24 June 2024 | 110 | 57 | 24 | 29 | 51.82 |
| Maccabi Tel Aviv | 24 June 2024 | 27 January 2026 | 88 | 46 | 17 | 25 | 52.27 |
| Al-Taawoun | 1 June 2026 | 12 September 2026 | 4 | 1 | 2 | 1 | 25.00 |
| Total | | | 270 | 126 | 61 | 83 | 46.67 |

== Honours ==
=== Club ===
Bežanija

- Serbian First League: 2005–06

Partizan

- Serbian SuperLiga: 2007–08
- Serbian Cup: 2007–08

Individual

- Serbian First League Top Scorer: 2005–06
- Serbian Cup Top Scorer: 2006–07

=== Manager ===
Maccabi Tel Aviv

- Israeli Premier League: 2024–25
- Toto Cup: 2024–25
- Israel Super Cup: 2024

Individual

- Serbian SuperLiga Manager of the Month: July 2022
