= Antonio Rukavina =

Serbian footballer (born 1984)

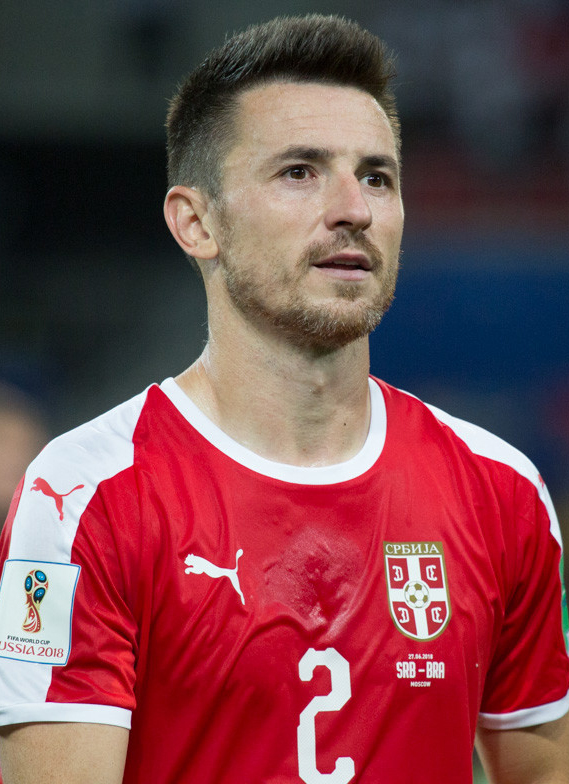
- Rukavina with Serbia at the 2018 FIFA World Cup

Personal information
- Date of birth: 26 January 1984 (age 42)
- Place of birth: Belgrade, SR Serbia, Yugoslavia
- Height: 1.77 m (5 ft 10 in)
- Position: Right-back

Youth career
- Bežanija

Senior career*
Years	Team	Apps	(Gls)
2002–2006	Bežanija	145	(18)
2007	Partizan	32	(4)
2008	Borussia Dortmund	19	(0)
2009–2012	1860 Munich	112	(1)
2012–2014	Valladolid	71	(2)
2014–2018	Villarreal	60	(0)
2018–2021	Astana	67	(0)
Total		507	(25)

International career
2007–2019	Serbia	59	(0)
Medal record
Silver medal – second place	UEFA Under-21 Championship	2007
- * Club domestic league appearances and goals

Antonio Rukavina (Serbian Cyrillic: Антонио Рукавина, pronounced [ǎntonio rukǎʋina]; born 26 January 1984) is a Serbian retired footballer who played as a right-back.

== Club career ==
Rukavina started out at his local club Bežanija, making his senior debuts in the 2002–03 season, as they won promotion to the Second League of Serbia and Montenegro. He also helped them win the 2005–06 Serbian First League, thus earning promotion to the Serbian SuperLiga.

In December 2006, it was announced that Partizan and Bežanija have agreed terms for the transfer of Rukavina and Žarko Lazetić. Both players signed four-year deals in January 2007. Under newly appointed manager Miroslav Đukić, Rukavina immediately established himself as a first team regular, scoring three league goals from 15 appearances in the second half of the 2006–07 season. He was subsequently named the team's captain ahead of the 2007–08 campaign.

In January 2008, Rukavina was transferred to German club Borussia Dortmund, penning a long-term contract. He made his Bundesliga debut in February of the same year, playing the full 90 minutes in a 3–3 away draw at MSV Duisburg. In February 2009, Rukavina moved on loan to 2. Bundesliga side 1860 Munich until the end of the season. He was permanently transferred to 1860 Munich in June 2009, with Sven Bender making the opposite move in lieu of a transfer fee.

In July 2012, Rukavina moved to Spain and signed with Valladolid, on a three-year deal, thus joining his countryman and former manager Miroslav Đukić. He made his La Liga debut in a 1–0 away win against Zaragoza that August, playing the whole match. In his two seasons at José Zorrilla, Rukavina collected 71 appearances and scored twice in the top flight of Spanish football.

On 8 July 2014, Rukavina signed a two-year contract for Villarreal. He collected 32 appearances in all competitions throughout his debut season with El Submarino Amarillo. In the next 2015–16 campaign, Rukavina appeared in 31 games, including 10 appearances in the UEFA Europa League.

In July 2018, Rukavina signed with Kazakh champions Astana on a free transfer. He helped them defend the league title in his first season. In August 2019, Rukavina extended his contract with the club until 2021. On 11 November 2021, Rukavina announced his retirement from football.

== International career ==
Rukavina represented Serbia at the 2007 UEFA European Under-21 Championship. He was the team's first-choice right-back during the tournament, making four appearances in the process, as they finished as runners-up after losing 4–1 in the final to the Netherlands, the host nation.

On 2 June 2007, Rukavina made his full international debut for Serbia, playing the full 90 minutes of a 2–0 win away at Finland in a UEFA Euro 2008 qualifier.

In June 2010, he was named in the final 23-man squad for the 2010 FIFA World Cup, but failed to make any appearances.

In June 2018, Serbia manager Mladen Krstajić included Rukavina in the final 23-man squad for the 2018 FIFA World Cup. He appeared in two games of the group stage, against Costa Rica and Brazil, as Serbia finished in third place. He earned a total of 59 caps (no goals) and his final international was a September 2019 European Championship qualification match away against Luxembourg.

== Personal life ==
Rukavina's paternal great-grandmother was from Croatia.

== Career statistics ==
=== Club ===
Appearances and goals by club, season and competition
Club	Season	League			National cup		Continental		Other		Total	
Club	Season	Division	Apps	Goals	Apps	Goals	Apps	Goals	Apps	Goals	Apps	Goals
Bežanija	2002–03	Serbian League Belgrade	27	8	—		—		—		27	8
Bežanija	2003–04	Second League of Serbia and Montenegro	33	3	—		—		—		33	3
Bežanija	2004–05	Second League of Serbia and Montenegro	33	2	—		—		—		33	2
Bežanija	2005–06	Serbian First League	36	3	—		—		—		36	3
Bežanija	2006–07	Serbian SuperLiga	16	2			—		—		16	2
Bežanija	Total		145	18			—		—		145	18
Partizan	2006–07	Serbian SuperLiga	15	3	2	0	0	0	—		17	3
Partizan	2007–08	Serbian SuperLiga	17	1	0	0	2	0	—		19	1
Partizan	Total		32	4	2	0	2	0	—		36	4
Borussia Dortmund	2007–08	Bundesliga	14	0	4	0	—		—		18	0
Borussia Dortmund	2008–09	Bundesliga	5	0	1	0	1	0	1 (Note: Appearance in German Supercup)	0	8	0
Borussia Dortmund	Total		19	0	5	0	1	0	1	0	26	0
1860 Munich (loan)	2008–09	2. Bundesliga	15	1	0	0	—		—		15	1
1860 Munich	2009–10	2. Bundesliga	32	0	3	0	—		—		35	0
1860 Munich	2010–11	2. Bundesliga	34	0	2	0	—		—		36	0
1860 Munich	2011–12	2. Bundesliga	31	0	2	0	—		—		33	0
1860 Munich	Total		112	1	7	0	—		—		119	1
Valladolid	2012–13	La Liga	37	1	1	0	—		—		38	1
Valladolid	2013–14	La Liga	34	1	1	0	—		—		35	1
Valladolid	Total		71	2	2	0	—		—		73	2
Villarreal	2014–15	La Liga	21	0	7	0	4	0	—		32	0
Villarreal	2015–16	La Liga	18	0	3	0	10	0	—		31	0
Villarreal	2016–17	La Liga	4	0	2	0	6	0	—		12	0
Villarreal	2017–18	La Liga	17	0	4	0	3	0	—		24	0
Villarreal	Total		60	0	16	0	23	0	—		99	0
Astana	2018	Kazakhstan; Premier League	3	0	0	0	14	0	0	0	17	0
Astana	2019	Kazakhstan; Premier League	28	0	0	0	14	0	1 (Note: Appearance in Kazakhstan Super Cup)	0	43	0
Astana	2020	Kazakhstan; Premier League	11	0	0	0	0	0	0	0	11	0
Astana	2021	Kazakhstan; Premier League	25	0	3	0	4	0	2	0	34	0
Astana	Total		67	0	3	0	32	0	3	0	105	0
Career total			507	25	35	0	58	0	4	0	604	25

=== International ===
Appearances and goals by national team and year
National team	Year	Apps	Goals
Serbia	2007	7	0
Serbia	2008	7	0
Serbia	2009	4	0
Serbia	2010	4	0
Serbia	2011	0	0
Serbia	2012	1	0
Serbia	2013	5	0
Serbia	2014	2	0
Serbia	2015	0	0
Serbia	2016	7	0
Serbia	2017	7	0
Serbia	2018	11	0
Serbia	2019	4	0
Total		59	0

== Honours ==
Bežanija

- Serbian First League: 2005–06
- Serbian League Belgrade: 2002–03

Borussia Dortmund

- German Supercup: 2008
- DFB-Pokal: runner-up 2007–08

Astana

- Kazakhstan Premier League: 2018, 2019
- Kazakhstan Super Cup: 2019

Serbia

- UEFA Under-21 Championship: runner-up 2007
