= Denis Cheryshev =

Russian footballer (born 1990)

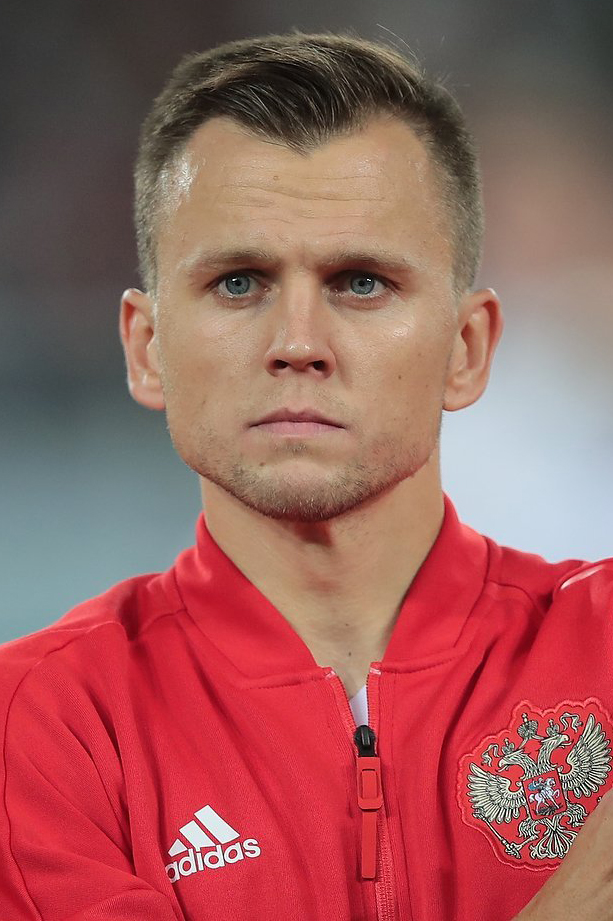
- Cheryshev with Russia in 2019

Personal information
- Full name: Denis Dmitriyevich Cheryshev
- Date of birth: 26 December 1990 (age 35)
- Place of birth: Nizhny Novgorod, Soviet Union
- Height: 1.73 m (5 ft 8 in)
- Position: Winger

Youth career
- 1996–2000: Sporting Gijón
- 2000–2002: Burgos Promesas
- 2002–2009: Real Madrid

Senior career*
Years	Team	Apps	(Gls)
2009–2013	Real Madrid B	104	(22)
2012–2016	Real Madrid	2	(0)
2013–2014	→ Sevilla (loan)	4	(0)
2014–2015	→ Villarreal (loan)	26	(4)
2016	→ Valencia (loan)	7	(3)
2016–2019	Villarreal	35	(2)
2018–2019	→ Valencia (loan)	27	(2)
2019–2022	Valencia	62	(1)
2022–2024	Venezia	32	(4)
2024–2025	Panionios	21	(2)
2026	Krasava Ypsonas	13	(2)
Total		333	(42)

International career
2005–2006	Russia U15	16	(9)
2006–2007	Russia U17	6	(5)
2008–2009	Russia U18	5	(2)
2011–2013	Russia U21	18	(7)
2012–2021	Russia	33	(12)
- * Club domestic league appearances and goals

Denis Dmitriyevich Cheryshev (Russian: Денис Дмитриевич Черышев, IPA: [dʲɪˈnʲis ˈdmʲitrʲɪjɪvʲɪtɕ ˈtɕerɨʂɨf]; born 26 December 1990) is a Russian former professional footballer who played as a left winger.

A youth product of Real Madrid, he made his debut for the reserves in 2009 and with the first team in 2012. He then had loan spells at Sevilla, Villarreal and Valencia before joining Villarreal permanently in 2016, and returned to Valencia on loan two years later. In June 2019, he signed permanently for the latter. He retired in 2026, following stints with clubs in Italy, Greece and Cyprus.

Having earned 45 caps and scored 23 goals in its youth categories, Cheryshev made his debut for Russia in 2012. He was a participant at the 2018 World Cup, scoring four goals as his team reached the quarter-finals, finishing among the tournament's top scorers, and also represented the country at Euro 2020.

== Club career ==
=== Early years ===
Born in Nizhny Novgorod, Russian Soviet Federative Socialist Republic, Soviet Union, Cheryshev started his career at Sporting de Gijón, where his father Dmitri was playing at the time. He soon followed him to his next club, Burgos, entering locals Burgos Promesas at the age of nine.

During his spell, Cheryshev was selected to play for the youth levels of the Castile and León regional team.

=== Real Madrid ===
Cheryshev joined Real Madrid in 2002, and completed his formative years in their academy. Still a junior, he appeared in nine Segunda División games with Real Madrid Castilla during the 2008–09 season; it was also during this time he formed a long-lasting friendship with future Spanish national team player Nacho.

Over the next two years, Cheryshev played 61 matches and scored 11 goals for the reserve side. He was an important attacking unit as the latter campaign ended in promotion to Segunda División after a five-year absence.

Cheryshev made his debut in division two on 17 August 2012, playing the full 90 minutes of the 2–1 away loss against Villarreal. On 27 November, he played his official game with the first team, in a 3–0 home win (7–1 on aggregate) over Alcoyano in the round of 32 of the Copa del Rey, becoming the first Russian player to feature for the club.

In September 2013, Cheryshev was loaned to fellow top-tier Sevilla for the remainder of the campaign with the possibility of a permanent deal. As a result of persistent injury concerns, he made only four league appearances and the Andalusians opted not to exercise the option, with the player joining Villarreal on loan for 2014–15 instead.

Cheryshev scored on his debut for Villarreal on 24 August 2014, netting the second goal in a 2–0 win at Levante. Having recovered from the injuries which plighted his time at his previous team, he thrived at El Madrigal and netted seven times from 40 appearances in all competitions.

Returned to the Santiago Bernabéu Stadium, Cheryshev made his debut in the top flight for Real Madrid on 19 September 2015, playing 13 minutes in the 1–0 defeat of Granada. He scored his first competitive goal for them on 2 December, featuring 45 minutes in a 3–1 away victory over Cádiz in the Spanish Cup's round of 32. However, his appearance in the match drew controversy as he was ineligible for selection after having collected three yellow cards in the previous edition of the tournament, and resulted in Real Madrid being expelled from the tournament; president Florentino Pérez claimed that the Royal Spanish Football Federation had not informed the club that the player was suspended and challenged the action taken against the team, though he was unsuccessful.

On 1 February 2016, Cheryshev was loaned to Valencia until June. He made his debut two days later, coming on as a second-half substitute in a 7–0 away loss against Barcelona in the semi-finals of the domestic cup. He scored his only goal on 13 February, when he headed home in a 2–1 win over Espanyol at the Mestalla Stadium.

Cheryshev was part of the Real Madrid 2015–16 UEFA Champions League-winning squad, becoming the fourth Russian player to achieve this following Igor Dobrovolsky, Vladimir But and Dmitry Alenichev.

=== Villarreal ===
On 15 June 2016, Cheryshev returned to Villarreal on a permanent deal where he signed a contract until 2021. On 14 August 2018, he returned to Valencia on loan, scoring twice during the season to help to a fourth-place finish.

=== Valencia ===
Cheryshev joined Valencia permanently on 29 June 2019, for a fee of €6 million. He scored his first Champions League goal on 23 October, opening an eventual 1–1 draw at Lille in the group stage.

Three years later, following a spell marred by injury problems, Cheryshev left after his contract expired.

=== Venezia ===
On 31 August 2022, Cheryshev signed a two-year deal with Venezia with the option for an additional season. He scored twice in his third Serie B appearance, a 4–1 away win against Cagliari on 1 October.

=== Later career ===
On 22 September 2024, Cheryshev joined Super League Greece 2 club Panionios. In February 2026, the 35-year-old agreed to a contract at Krasava ENY Ypsonas in the Cypriot First Division.

== International career ==
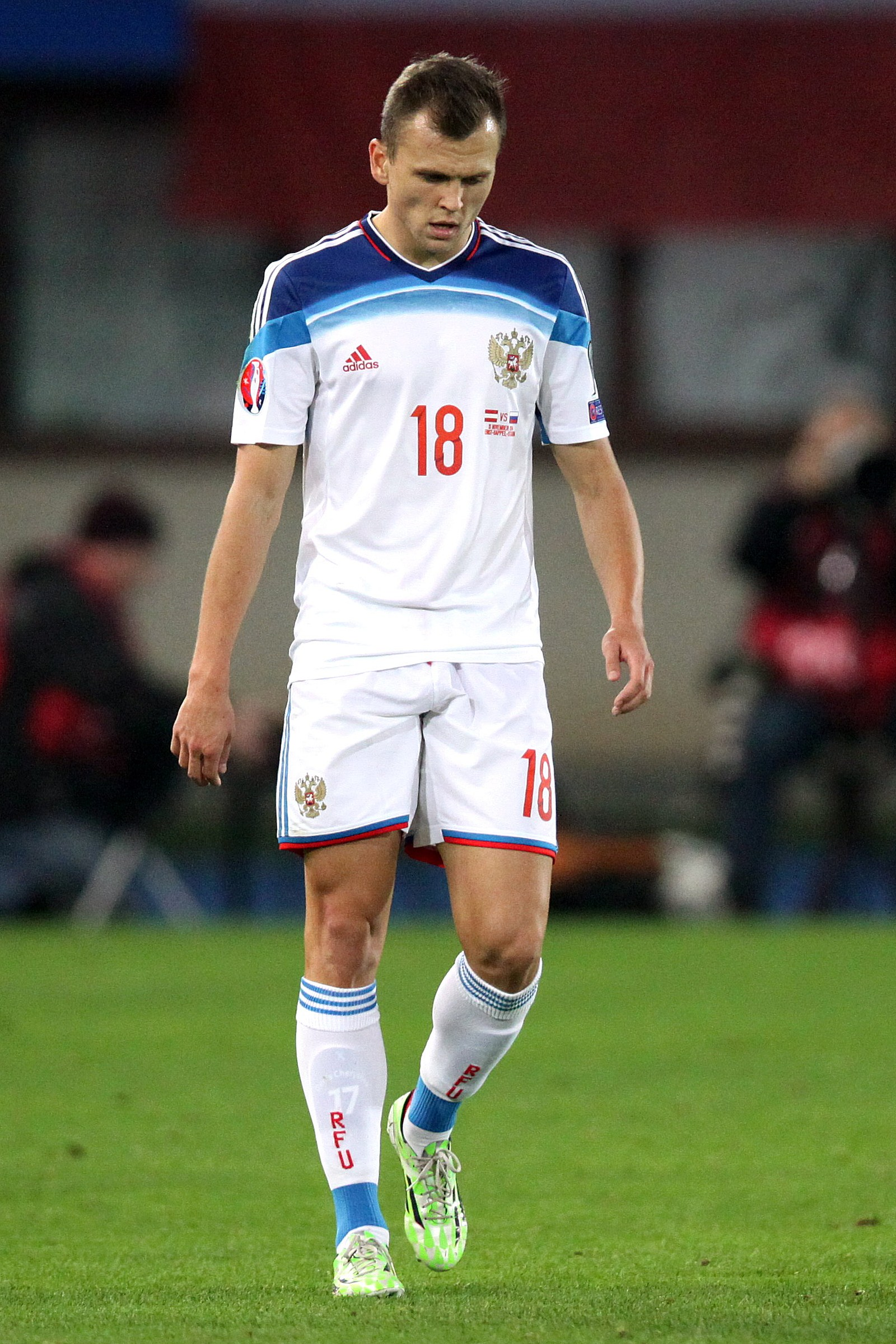
Cheryshev playing for Russia in a Euro 2016 qualifier against Austria in 2014

Prior to making his international debut with Russia, Cheryshev was also eligible to represent Spain as he held dual nationality. In a 2011 interview with Marca he indicated that he felt more Spanish than Russian, but accepted a call up to the Russian team in November 2012. He made his debut eight days later in a 2–2 friendly draw with the United States, the same opposition his father Dmitri had played against 20 years earlier.

Cheryshev played his first competitive game on 14 August 2013, when he came on as a half-time substitute in a 2014 FIFA World Cup qualifier against Northern Ireland in Belfast; after just five minutes on the pitch, he had to be stretchered off in an eventual 1–0 loss. He was called up to a provisional 25-man squad for the finals on 16 May 2014, being the only player present not playing his club football in Russia. He was, however, left out of Fabio Capello's final list and also later missed the UEFA Euro 2016 tournament due to injury.

After an absence of more than two years, Cheryshev appeared for the national team again on 27 March 2018 in a friendly with France. On 11 May, he was included in an extended squad for that year's World Cup, also being named as one of the final 23 players. He made his debut in the competition on 14 June, replacing the injured Alan Dzagoev midway through the first half of the group stage opener against Saudi Arabia in Moscow and scoring twice in a 5–0 win. He scored his third goal of the tournament against Egypt in a 3–1 victory, adding another in the quarter-finals when he curled a strike past Croatia's Danijel Subašić from just outside the 18-yard area to open the scoring, but in an eventual 4–3 penalty shoot-out loss.

Cheryshev made a preliminary 30-man squad for Euro 2020 in May 2021. On 2 June, he was included in the final squad. He came on for Daler Kuzyayev after the latter was stretchered off in the first group game against Belgium, spending 33 minutes on the field before being himself replaced in a 3–0 defeat; according to manager Stanislav Cherchesov, he was substituted because he "did not fit into the game". He did not take the field in the following two matches, with the country being eliminated in the group stage.

== Career statistics ==
=== Club ===
As of match played on 26 April 2025

Appearances and goals by club, season and competition
Club	Season	League			National cup (Note: Includes Copa del Rey, Coppa Italia)		Continental		Other		Total	
Club	Season	Division	Apps	Goals	Apps	Goals	Apps	Goals	Apps	Goals	Apps	Goals
Real Madrid B	2008–09	Segunda División B	9	0	—		—		—		9	1
Real Madrid B	2010–11	Segunda División B	30	3	—		—		2 (Note: Appearances in Segunda División B play-offs)	0	32	3
Real Madrid B	2011–12	Segunda División B	31	8	—		—		3	0	34	8
Real Madrid B	2012–13	Segunda División	34	11	—		—		—		34	11
Real Madrid B	Total		104	22	—		—		5	0	109	22
Real Madrid	2012–13	La Liga	0	0	1	0	0	0	0	0	1	0
Real Madrid	2015–16	La Liga	2	0	1	1	3 (Note: Appearances in UEFA Champions League)	0	—		6	1
Real Madrid	Total		2	0	2	1	3	0	—		7	1
Sevilla (loan)	2013–14	La Liga	4	0	0	0	1 (Note: Appearances in UEFA Europa League)	0	—		5	0
Villarreal (loan)	2014–15	La Liga	26	4	6	1	8	2	—		40	7
Valencia (loan)	2015–16	La Liga	7	3	1	0	0	0	—		8	3
Villarreal	2016–17	La Liga	11	0	1	0	6	0	—		18	0
Villarreal	2017–18	La Liga	24	2	3	1	5	1	—		32	4
Villarreal	Total		35	3	4	1	11	1	—		50	4
Valencia (loan)	2018–19	La Liga	27	2	7	1	7 (Note: Three appearances in UEFA Champions League, four appearances and one goal in UEFA Europa League)	1	—		41	4
Valencia	2019–20	La Liga	24	1	0	0	6	2	1 (Note: Appearance in Supercopa de España)	0	31	3
Valencia	2020–21	La Liga	21	0	1	0	—		—		22	0
Valencia	2021–22	La Liga	17	0	3	1	—		—		20	1
Valencia	Total		89	3	11	2	13	3	1	0	114	8
Venezia	2022–23	Serie B	23	4	—		—		1 (Note: Appearance in Serie B promotion play-offs)	0	24	4
Venezia	2023–24	Serie B	9	0	1	0	—		—		10	0
Venezia	Total		32	4	1	0	—		1	0	34	4
Panionios	2024–25	Super League Greece 2	21	2	3	3	—		—		24	5
Career total			320	40	28	8	36	6	7	0	391	54

=== International ===
Appearances and goals by national team and year
National team	Year	Apps	Goals
Russia	2012	1	0
Russia	2013	1	0
Russia	2014	5	0
Russia	2015	2	0
Russia	2016	0	0
Russia	2017	0	0
Russia	2018	11	6
Russia	2019	5	5
Russia	2020	5	1
Russia	2021	3	0
Total		33	12

Scores and results list Russia's goal tally first, score column indicates score after each Cheryshev goal.

List of international goals scored by Denis Cheryshev
No.	Date	Venue	Opponent	Score	Result	Competition
1	14 June 2018	Luzhniki Stadium, Moscow, Russia	Saudi Arabia	2–0	5–0	2018 FIFA World Cup
2	14 June 2018	Luzhniki Stadium, Moscow, Russia	Saudi Arabia	4–0	5–0	2018 FIFA World Cup
3	19 June 2018	Krestovsky Stadium, Saint Petersburg, Russia	Egypt	2–0	3–1	2018 FIFA World Cup
4	7 July 2018	Fisht Olympic Stadium, Sochi, Russia	Croatia	1–0	2–2	2018 FIFA World Cup
5	7 September 2018	Şenol Güneş Stadium, Trabzon, Turkey	Turkey	1–0	2–1	2018–19 UEFA Nations League B
6	14 October 2018	Fisht Olympic Stadium, Sochi, Russia	Turkey	2–0	2–0	2018–19 UEFA Nations League B
7	21 March 2019	King Baudouin Stadium, Brussels, Belgium	Belgium	1–1	1–3	UEFA Euro 2020 qualifying
8	24 March 2019	Astana Arena, Nur-Sultan, Kazakhstan	Kazakhstan	1–0	4–0	UEFA Euro 2020 qualifying
9	24 March 2019	Astana Arena, Nur-Sultan, Kazakhstan	Kazakhstan	2–0	4–0	UEFA Euro 2020 qualifying
10	13 October 2019	GSP Stadium, Nicosia, Cyprus	Cyprus	1–0	5–0	UEFA Euro 2020 qualifying
11	13 October 2019	GSP Stadium, Nicosia, Cyprus	Cyprus	5–0	5–0	UEFA Euro 2020 qualifying
12	15 November 2020	Şükrü Saracoğlu Stadium, Istanbul, Turkey	Turkey	1–0	2–3	2020–21 UEFA Nations League B

== Honours ==
Real Madrid Castilla

- Segunda División B: 2011–12

Sevilla

- UEFA Europa League: 2013–14

Real Madrid

- UEFA Champions League: 2015–16

Valencia

- Copa del Rey: 2018–19

Individual

- FIFA World Cup Fantasy Team: 2018
