= 2017–18 Villarreal CF season =

Villarreal
2017–18 season
- President: Fernando Roig
- Head coach: Fran Escribá (until 25 September); Javier Calleja (from 25 September)
- Stadium: La Cerámica
- La Liga: 5th
- Copa del Rey: Round of 16
- UEFA Europa League: Round of 32
- Top goalscorer: League: Carlos Bacca (15); All: Carlos Bacca (18)
Home colours	Away colours	Third colours

The 2017–18 season was Villarreal Club de Fútbol's 95th season in existence and the club's 5th consecutive season in the top flight of Spanish football. In addition to the domestic league, Villarreal participated in this season's editions of the Copa del Rey and the UEFA Europa League. The season covered the period from 1 July 2017 to 30 June 2018.

== Squad ==
As of 28 February 2018

Note: Flags indicate national team as defined under FIFA eligibility rules; some limited exceptions apply. Players may hold more than one non-FIFA nationality.

No.	Pos.	Nation	Player
1	GK	ESP	Sergio Asenjo
2	DF	ESP	Mario Gaspar (vice-captain)
3	DF	ESP	Álvaro
4	DF	POR	Rúben Semedo
5	DF	ESP	Adrián Marín
6	DF	ESP	Víctor Ruiz
7	MF	RUS	Denis Cheryshev
8	MF	ESP	Pablo Fornals
9	FW	COL	Carlos Bacca (on loan from Milan)
10	MF	ESP	Samu Castillejo
11	DF	ESP	Jaume Costa

No.	Pos.	Nation	Player
12	MF	KSA	Salem Al-Dawsari (on loan from Al-Hilal)
13	GK	ESP	Andrés Fernández
14	MF	ESP	Manu Trigueros
15	FW	TUR	Enes Ünal
16	MF	ESP	Rodri
18	FW	ITA	Nicola Sansone
20	MF	ITA	Roberto Soriano
21	MF	ESP	Bruno (captain)
22	DF	SRB	Antonio Rukavina
23	DF	ITA	Daniele Bonera
24	MF	SEN	Alfred N'Diaye
25	GK	ARG	Mariano Barbosa
35	MF	ARG	Leo Suárez

=== Transfers ===
- List of Spanish football transfers summer 2017 § Villarreal

==== In ====
Date	Player	From	Type	Fee	Ref
31 May 2017	(Turkey) Enes Ünal	(England) Manchester City	Transfer	€8,500,000	
7 June 2017	(Portugal) Rúben Semedo	(Portugal) Sporting CP	Transfer	€14,000,000	
21 June 2017	(Spain) Andrés Fernández	(Portugal) Porto	Transfer	€1,700,000	
30 June 2017	(Qatar) Akram Afif	(Spain) Sporting Gijón	Loan return	Free	
30 June 2017	(Spain) Alfonso Pedraza	(England) Leeds United	Loan return	Free	
30 June 2017	(Spain) Pablo Íñiguez	(Spain) Rayo Vallecano	Loan return	Free	
30 June 2017	(Argentina) Cristian Espinoza	(Spain) Real Valladolid	Loan return	Free	
30 June 2017	(Spain) Adrián Marín	(Spain) Leganés	Loan return	Free	
30 June 2017	(Senegal) Alfred N'Diaye	(England) Hull City	Loan return	Free	
24 July 2017	(Spain) Pablo Fornals	(Spain) Málaga	Transfer	€12,000,000	
16 August 2017	(Colombia) Carlos Bacca	(Italy) Milan	Loan	€2,500,000	
21 January 2018	(Saudi Arabia) Salem Al-Dawsari	(Saudi Arabia) Al-Hilal	Loan	Disclosed	

==== Out ====
Date	Player	To	Type	Fee	Ref
30 May 2017	(Argentina) Mateo Musacchio	(Italy) Milan	Transfer	€18,000,000	
30 June 2017	(Spain) Adrián	(Portugal) Porto	Loan return	Free	
30 June 2017	(Spain) José Ángel	(Portugal) Porto	Loan return	Free	
30 June 2017	(Colombia) Rafael Santos Borré	(Spain) Atlético Madrid	Loan return	Free	
5 July 2017	(Spain) Alfonso Pedraza	(Spain) Alavés	Loan	Free	
12 July 2017	(Spain) Pablo Íñiguez	(Spain) Reus	Transfer	Free	
14 July 2017	(Qatar) Akram Afif	(Belgium) Eupen	Loan	Free	
18 July 2017	(Argentina) Cristian Espinoza	(Argentina) Boca Juniors	Loan	Free	
28 July 2017	(Mexico) Jonathan dos Santos	(United States) LA Galaxy	Transfer	€4,300,000	
9 August 2017	(Spain) Roberto Soldado	(Turkey) Fenerbahçe	Transfer	€5,000,000	
28 February 2018	(Democratic Republic of the Congo) Cédric Bakambu	(China) Beijing Guoan	Transfer	€37,000,000	

== Competitions ==
=== Overall record ===
Competition	First match	Last match	Starting round	Final position	Record							
Competition	First match	Last match	Starting round	Final position	Pld	W	D	L	GF	GA	GD	Win %
La Liga	21 August 2017	20 May 2018	Matchday 1	5th	38	18	7	13	57	50	+7	47.37
Copa del Rey	25 October 2017	10 January 2018	Round of 32	Round of 16	4	1	2	1	6	5	+1	25.00
UEFA Europa League	14 September 2017	22 February 2018	Group stage	Round of 32	8	3	2	3	11	10	+1	37.50
Total					50	22	11	17	74	65	+9	44.00

Source: Competitions

=== La Liga ===
==== League table ====
Pos	Team	Pld	W	D	L	GF	GA	GD	Pts	Qualification or relegation
3	Real Madrid	38	22	10	6	94	44	+50	76	Qualification for the Champions League group stage
4	Valencia	38	22	7	9	65	38	+27	73	Qualification for the Champions League group stage
5	Villarreal	38	18	7	13	57	50	+7	61	Qualification for the Europa League group stage (Note: Since the winners of the 2017–18 Copa del Rey, Barcelona, qualified for European competition based on league position, the spot awarded to the cup winners (Europa League group stage) was passed to the sixth-placed team and the spot awarded to the sixth-placed team (Europa League second qualifying round) was passed to the seventh-placed team.)
6	Real Betis	38	18	6	14	60	61	−1	60	Qualification for the Europa League group stage
7	Sevilla	38	17	7	14	49	58	−9	58	Qualification for the Europa League second qualifying round

Source: La Liga, Soccerway
Rules for classification: 1) Points; 2) Head-to-head points; 3) Head-to-head goal difference; 4) Goal difference; 5) Goals scored; 6) Fair-play points (Note: Head-to-head record is used only after all the matches between the teams in question have been played)

==== Results summary ====
Overall								Home						Away					
Pld	W	D	L	GF	GA	GD	Pts	W	D	L	GF	GA	GD	W	D	L	GF	GA	GD
38	18	7	13	57	50	+7	61	11	3	5	35	22	+13	7	4	8	22	28	−6

Source: Competitive matches

==== Results by round ====
Round	1	2	3	4	5	6	7	8	9	10	11	12	13	14	15	16	17	18	19	20	21	22	23	24	25	26	27	28	29	30	31	32	33	34	35	36	37	38
Ground	A	A	H	A	H	A	H	A	H	A	H	A	H	A	H	A	A	H	A	H	H	A	H	A	H	A	H	A	H	A	H	A	H	H	H	A	A	H
Result	L	L	W	W	D	L	W	W	W	D	W	D	L	L	L	W	W	D	W	W	W	L	L	D	W	L	L	W	W	L	L	D	W	W	W	L	W	D
Position	18	19	13	7	9	14	9	8	6	6	5	6	6	6	6	6	6	6	5	5	5	5	5	6	5	6	6	6	5	5	6	6	6	6	6	6	5	5

Source: Competitive matches
A = Away; H = Home; W = Win; D = Draw; L = Loss

==== Matches ====
Win Draw Loss Fixtures

21 August 2017 1	Levante	1–0	Villarreal	Valencia
20:15 CEST (UTC+2)	Lerma (yellow card) 34'; Morales 88' (pen.)	Report	Trigueros (yellow card) 37'; Ruiz (yellow card) 63'; Rukavina (yellow card) 87'	Stadium: Ciutat de València; Attendance: 12,942; Referee: Alfonso Álvarez Izquierdo

25 August 2017 2	Real Sociedad	3–0	Villarreal	San Sebastián
20:15 CEST (UTC+2)	Elustondo (yellow card) 16'; Willian José 25', (yellow card) 39'; Prieto 34'; Juanmi 45'	Report	Costa (yellow card) 3'; Trigueros (yellow card) 68'	Stadium: Anoeta; Attendance: 19,931; Referee: Xavier Estrada Fernández

10 September 2017 3	Villarreal	3–1	Real Betis	Villarreal
20:45 CEST (UTC+2)	Costa (yellow card) 10'; Bacca 32'; Álvaro (yellow card) 45'; Castillejo 61'; Ünal 77'; Rukavina (yellow card) 90+2'	Report	León 11'	Stadium: La Cerámica; Attendance: 18,638; Referee: David Medié Jiménez

17 September 2017 4	Alavés	0–3	Villarreal	Vitoria-Gasteiz
12:00 CEST (UTC+2)	Sobrino (yellow card) 80'; Pedraza (yellow card) 90+3'	Report	Bakambu 32', 62'; Rodri (yellow card) 45'; Bacca 52'; Ruiz (yellow card) 67'	Stadium: Mendizorrotza; Attendance: 18,124; Referee: Santiago Jaime Latre

21 September 2017 5	Villarreal	0–0	Espanyol	Villarreal
20:00 CEST (UTC+2)	Bacca (yellow card) 31'; Bakambu (yellow card) 41'; Trigueros (yellow card) 71'; Álvaro (yellow card) 74'; Fornals (yellow card) 85'	Report	Sánchez (yellow card) 77'; Fuego (yellow card) 86'	Stadium: La Cerámica; Attendance: 17,071; Referee: José Luis Munuera Montero

24 September 2017 6	Getafe	4–0	Villarreal	Getafe
16:15 CEST (UTC+2)	Arambarri (yellow card) 19'; Ángel 54', 90+2'; Molina 64'; Bergara 67'	Report	Bakambu (yellow card) 42'; Trigueros (yellow card) 65'; Rodri (yellow card) 74'; Soriano (yellow card) 90+1'	Stadium: Coliseum Alfonso Pérez; Attendance: 10,874; Referee: Ignacio Iglesias Villanueva

1 October 2017 7	Villarreal	3–0	Eibar	Villarreal
18:30 CEST (UTC+2)	Bakambu 25', 52', 76' (pen.); Rodri (yellow card) 31'; Álvaro (yellow card) 47'	Report	García (yellow card) 50'	Stadium: La Cerámica; Attendance: 17,090; Referee: Mario Melero López

15 October 2017 8	Girona	1–2	Villarreal	Girona
16:15 CEST (UTC+2)	Stuani 40', (yellow card) 90'; Kayode (yellow card) 86'	Report	Bakambu 9', 20', (yellow card) 79'; Álvaro (yellow card) 59'; Rodri (yellow card) 90'; Bacca (yellow card) 90+2'	Stadium: Montilivi; Attendance: 9,935; Referee: Carlos del Cerro Grande

22 October 2017 9	Villarreal	4–0	Las Palmas	Villarreal
12:00 CEST (UTC+2)	Ruiz (yellow card) 30'; Bakambu 48'; Mario Gaspar 65'; Navarro 67' (o.g.); Sansone 90+3'	Report	Lemos (yellow card) 24'; Gómez (yellow card) 40'; Navarro (yellow card) 73'; Viera (yellow card) 75'; Michel (yellow card) 86'	Stadium: La Cerámica; Attendance: 16,709; Referee: David Fernández Borbalán

28 October 2017 10	Atlético Madrid	1–1	Villarreal	Madrid
18:30 CEST (UTC+2)	Correa 61'	Report	Trigueros (yellow card) 25'; Bakambu (yellow card) 55'; Bacca (yellow card) 79', (goal) 81'; Álvaro (yellow card) 85'	Stadium: Wanda Metropolitano; Attendance: 61,421; Referee: Alberto Undiano Mallenco

5 November 2017 11	Villarreal	2–0	Málaga	Villarreal
18:30 CET (UTC+1)	Chuca (yellow card) 45'; Sansone 68', 76'; Costa (yellow card) 81'	Report	Castro (yellow card) 32'; Peñaranda (yellow card) 38'; Adrián (yellow card) 60'; Juan Carlos (yellow card) 75'; Recio (yellow card) 83'	Stadium: La Cerámica; Attendance: 17,522; Referee: Xavier Estrada Fernández

19 November 2017 12	Athletic Bilbao	1–1	Villarreal	Bilbao
20:45 CET (UTC+1)	Iturraspe (yellow card) 19'; Aduriz 77'	Report	Bonera (yellow card) 5'; Trigueros 28'; Costa (yellow card) 34'; Ruiz (yellow card) 63'	Stadium: San Mamés; Attendance: 36,666; Referee: David Medié Jiménez

26 November 2017 13	Villarreal	2–3	Sevilla	Villarreal
18:30 CET (UTC+1)	Bakambu 19'; Ruiz (yellow card) 23' (yellow-red card) 77'; Bacca 53'; Guerra (yellow card) 55'; Costa (yellow card) 90+2'	Report	Lenglet 56'; Vázquez 57'; Pizarro (yellow card) 66'; Banega (yellow card) 72', (goal) 78' (pen.); Correa (yellow card) 86'	Stadium: La Cerámica; Attendance: 18,698; Referee: Javier Alberola Rojas

3 December 2017 14	Leganés	3–1	Villarreal	Leganés
12:00 CET (UTC+1)	Rico (yellow card) 45', (goal) 72'; El Zhar 81', (yellow card) 90+1'; Gabriel 90+3'	Report	Raba (yellow card) 17', (goal) 60'; Trigueros (yellow card) 42'; Bonera (yellow card) 42'; Marín (yellow card) 50'	Stadium: Butarque; Attendance: 9,233; Referee: David Fernández Borbalán

10 December 2017 15	Villarreal	0–2	Barcelona	Villarreal
20:45 CET (UTC+1)	Raba (red card) 60'; Bakambu (yellow card) 61'; Álvaro (yellow card) 86'	Report	Busquets (yellow card) 45'; L. Suárez 72'; Messi 83'	Stadium: La Cerámica; Attendance: 21,087; Referee: Ricardo de Burgos Bengoetxea

17 December 2017 16	Celta Vigo	0–1	Villarreal	Vigo
16:15 CET (UTC+1)	Jonny (yellow card) 81'	Report	Fornals (yellow card) 13', (goal) 34'; Costa (yellow card) 64'; Trigueros (yellow card) 80'	Stadium: Balaídos; Attendance: 18,215; Referee: Xavier Estrada Fernández

23 December 2017 17	Valencia	0–1	Villarreal	Valencia
16:15 CET (UTC+1)	Kondogbia (yellow card) 15'; Parejo (yellow card) 45'; Zaza (yellow card) 58' (yellow-red card) 60'; Gabriel (yellow card) 81'; Neto (yellow card) 82'; Montoya (yellow card) 90+2'	Report	Bacca 24'; Fornals (yellow card) 27'; Álvaro (yellow card) 39'; Trigueros (yellow card) 54' (yellow-red card) 83'; Rukavina (yellow card) 62'	Stadium: Mestalla; Attendance: 39,181; Referee: Daniel Trujillo Suárez

7 January 2018 18	Villarreal	1–1	Deportivo La Coruña	Villarreal
18:30 CET (UTC+1)	Ruiz (yellow card) 28'; Ünal 30'; Álvaro (yellow card) 54'; Mario Gaspar (yellow card) 77'; Bacca (yellow card) 77'	Report	Guilherme (yellow card) 60'; Luisinho (yellow card) 72'; Sidnei (yellow card) 77'; Andone 84'	Stadium: La Cerámica; Attendance: 15,442; Referee: David Medié Jiménez

13 January 2018 19	Real Madrid	0–1	Villarreal	Madrid
16:45 CET (UTC+1)	Carvajal (yellow card) 58'; Vázquez (yellow card) 89'	Report	Bacca (yellow card) 44'; Fornals 87'	Stadium: Santiago Bernabéu; Attendance: 63,477; Referee: Alberto Undiano Mallenco

21 January 2018 20	Villarreal	2–1	Levante	Villarreal
18:30 CET (UTC+1)	Trigueros 26' (pen.); Costa (yellow card) 39'; Cheryshev 50'; Álvaro (yellow card) 87'	Report	Lukić (yellow card) 31'; Postigo (yellow card) 64'; Roger 90+4'	Stadium: La Cerámica; Attendance: 16,810; Referee: José González González

27 January 2018 21	Villarreal	4–2	Real Sociedad	Villarreal
20:45 CET (UTC+1)	Ruiz 5'; Fornals 17'; Bacca 20'; Castillejo 34'; Costa (yellow card) 82'	Report	Llorente 24'; Willian José 58'; Navas (yellow card) 75'	Stadium: La Cerámica; Attendance: 14,918; Referee: Carlos del Cerro Grande

3 February 2018 22	Real Betis	2–1	Villarreal	Seville
16:15 CET (UTC+1)	Loren 45', 65'; Barragán (yellow card) 79'	Report	Bonera (red card) 31'; Rodri (yellow card) 40'; Mario Gaspar (yellow card) 40'; Bacca 80' (pen.)	Stadium: Benito Villamarín; Attendance: 49,066; Referee: Javier Alberola Rojas

11 February 2018 23	Villarreal	1–2	Alavés	Villarreal
13:00 CET (UTC+1)	Bacca (yellow card) 18', (goal) 77'; Castillejo (yellow card) 63'; Costa (yellow card) 70'; Raba (yellow card) 90+3'	Report	Laguardia (yellow card) 29'; Ely 39'; Duarte (yellow card) 54'; Guidetti (yellow card) 64'; Ibai 71'; Pacheco (yellow card) 84'	Stadium: La Cerámica; Attendance: 14,984; Referee: Daniel Trujillo Suárez

18 February 2018 24	Espanyol	1–1	Villarreal	Cornellà de Llobregat
18:30 CET (UTC+1)	García (yellow card) 35'; Granero 85'	Report	Ruiz (yellow card) 7'; Rodri 25', (yellow card) 76'; Mario Gaspar (yellow card) 44'; Álvaro (yellow card) 63'; Fuego (yellow card) 65'; Bacca (yellow card) 85'; Rukavina (yellow card) 86'	Stadium: RCDE Stadium; Attendance: 19,688; Referee: José Luis Munuera Montero

25 February 2018 25	Villarreal	1–0	Getafe	Villarreal
12:00 CET (UTC+1)	Ünal 3', (yellow card) 50'; Ruiz (yellow card) 13'; Soriano (yellow card) 52'; Castillejo (yellow card) 53'; Costa (yellow card) 82'	Report	Molinero (yellow card) 43'; Antunes (yellow card) 75'; Fajr (yellow card) 78'	Stadium: La Cerámica; Attendance: 16,125; Referee: José María Sánchez Martínez

28 February 2018 26	Eibar	1–0	Villarreal	Eibar
21:30 CET (UTC+1)	Kike 16'; Arbilla (yellow card) 51'; Juncà (yellow card) 73'; Dmitrović (yellow card) 81'; Orellana (yellow card) 90+1'	Report	Álvaro (yellow card) 27'; Mario Gaspar (yellow card) 72'	Stadium: Ipurua; Attendance: 4,056; Referee: Mario Melero López

3 March 2018 27	Villarreal	0–2	Girona	Villarreal
13:00 CET (UTC+1)	Raba (yellow card) 2'; Costa (yellow card) 34'; Bonera (yellow card) 39'; Mario Gaspar (yellow card) 61'	Report	Stuani 16'; Granell (yellow card) 42'; Lozano 80'	Stadium: La Cerámica; Attendance: 14,540; Referee: Pablo González Fuertes

11 March 2018 28	Las Palmas	0–2	Villarreal	Las Palmas
18:30 CET (UTC+1)	Navarro (yellow card) 61'; Gálvez (red card) 90+1'	Report	Costa (yellow card) 17'; Bacca 67'; Sansone 90+2' (pen.)	Stadium: Gran Canaria; Attendance: 18,855; Referee: David Medié Jiménez

18 March 2018 29	Villarreal	2–1	Atlético Madrid	Villarreal
18:30 CET (UTC+1)	Fornals (yellow card) 12'; Álvaro (yellow card) 45'; Rodri (yellow card) 66'; Bacca (yellow card) 67'; Ünal 82', 90+1'; Sansone (yellow card) 90+4'	Report	Griezmann (yellow card) 15', (goal) 20' (pen.); Giménez (yellow card) 61'; D. Costa (yellow card) 90+3'; Vitolo (red card) 90+3'	Stadium: La Cerámica; Attendance: 19,385; Referee: David Fernández Borbalán

1 April 2018 30	Málaga	1–0	Villarreal	Málaga
18:30 CEST (UTC+2)	Castro 37' (pen.); Lacen (yellow card) 66'; Torres (yellow card) 77'	Report	Costa (yellow card) 20'; Ansenjo (yellow card) 36'; Soriano (yellow card) 47'	Stadium: La Rosaleda; Attendance: 19,345; Referee: Alfonso Álvarez Izquierdo

9 April 2018 31	Villarreal	1–3	Athletic Bilbao	Villarreal
21:00 CEST (UTC+2)	Bonera (yellow card) 38'; Bacca (yellow card) 45', (goal) 67'; Álvaro (yellow card) 64' (yellow-red card) 89'; Asenjo (yellow card) 87'	Report	Córdoba 4'; I. Martínez (yellow card) 41'; Núñez (yellow card) 45'; Williams 51'; Iturraspe (yellow card) 67'; Arrizabalaga (yellow card) 74'; De Marcos (yellow card) 81'; Muniain 87'	Stadium: La Cerámica; Attendance: 14,869; Referee: Ignacio Iglesias Villanueva

15 April 2018 32	Sevilla	2–2	Villarreal	Seville
13:00 CEST (UTC+2)	Banega (yellow card) 37'; Sarabia (yellow card) 51'; Ben Yedder (yellow card) 62' (yellow-red card) 62'; Nolito 78'; Nzonzi 82'; Escudero (yellow card) 87'	Report	Cheryshev (yellow card) 22'; Raba 36'; Costa (yellow card) 55' (yellow-red card) 76'; Bacca 68'	Stadium: Ramón Sánchez Pizjuán; Attendance: 32,192; Referee: Pablo González Fuertes

17 April 2018 33	Villarreal	2–1	Leganés	Villarreal
21:30 CEST (UTC+2)	Trigueros (yellow card) 39'; Ruiz 42'; Bacca 55'	Report	Gabriel (yellow card) 32'; Brašanac 82'	Stadium: La Cerámica; Attendance: 12,556; Referee: Daniel Trujillo Suárez

28 April 2018 34	Villarreal	4–1	Celta Vigo	Villarreal
20:45 CEST (UTC+2)	Bacca 13', 35', 38'; Trigueros (yellow card) 56'; Castillejo (yellow card) 64', (goal) 90+3'	Report	Sisto 34'	Stadium: La Cerámica; Attendance: 14,135; Referee: Javier Alberola Rojas

5 May 2018 35	Villarreal	1–0	Valencia	Villarreal
20:45 CEST (UTC+2)	Rukavina (yellow card) 11'; Cheryshev (yellow card) 29'; Rodri (yellow card) 34'; Ruiz (yellow card) 84'; Mario Gaspar 86'; Asenjo (yellow card) 90+2'	Report	Guedes (yellow card) 21'; Gayà (yellow card) 43'; Parejo (yellow card) 60'	Stadium: La Cerámica; Attendance: 19,079; Referee: Jesús Gil Manzano

9 May 2018 36	Barcelona	5–1	Villarreal	Barcelona
20:00 CEST (UTC+2)	Coutinho 11'; Paulinho 16'; Messi 45'; Dembélé 87', 93'	Report	Ruiz (yellow card) 43'; Sansone 54'; Fuego (yellow card) 71'; Mario Gaspar (yellow card) 81'	Stadium: Camp Nou; Attendance: 54,743; Referee: José María Sánchez Martínez

12 May 2018 37	Deportivo La Coruña	2–4	Villarreal	A Coruña
18:30 CEST (UTC+2)	Guilherme (yellow card) 22'; Valle 58', 88', (yellow card) 61'; Albentosa (yellow card) 74'	Report	Castillejo 2', 45'; Trigueros 31'; Cheyshev 90+2'	Stadium: Riazor; Attendance: 12,885; Referee: Alejandro Hernández Hernández

20 May 2018 38	Villarreal	2–2	Real Madrid	Villarreal
20:45 CEST (UTC+2)	Roger 70', (yellow card) 88'; Castillejo (yellow card) 79', (goal) 85'; Álvaro (yellow card) 79'; Salem (yellow card) 90+4'	Report	Bale 11'; Ronaldo 32'; Modrić (yellow card) 48'; Casemiro (yellow card) 84'; Kroos (yellow card) 89'	Stadium: La Cerámica; Attendance: 18,891; Referee: José María Sánchez Martínez

=== Copa del Rey ===
==== Round of 32 ====
25 October 2017 First leg	Ponferradina	1–0	Villarreal	Ponferrada
20:30 CEST (UTC+2)	Cidoncha 37'; García (yellow card) 45+1'; Yuri (yellow card) 57'; Moreno (yellow card) 90+2'	Report	Soriano (yellow card) 90+4'	Stadium: El Toralín; Attendance: 8,800; Referee: Mario Melero López

30 November 2017 Second leg	Villarreal	3–0 (3–1 agg.)	Ponferradina	Villarreal
19:30 CET (UTC+1)	Soriano (yellow card) 31'; Bakambu 47', 62'; Bacca 64'	Report		Stadium: La Cerámica; Attendance: 10,591; Referee: Santiago Jaime Latre

==== Round of 16 ====
4 January 2018 First leg	Leganés	1–0	Villarreal	Leganés
19:00 CET (UTC+1)	Pérez (yellow card) 32'; Amrabat 49'; Siovas (yellow card) 90'	Report	Álvaro (yellow card) 67'	Stadium: Butarque; Attendance: 9,173; Referee: José María Sánchez Martínez

10 January 2018 Second leg	Villarreal	2–1 (2–2 (a) agg.)	Leganés	Villarreal
19:30 CET (UTC+1)	Rukavina (yellow card) 36'; Raba 48'; Fornals (yellow card) 64'; Cheryshev 89'	Report	El Zhar 31'; Siovas (yellow card) 44'; Gumbau (yellow card) 53'; Champagne (yellow card) 64'; Pérez (yellow card) 90+4'	Stadium: La Ceramica; Attendance: 12,122; Referee: Alfonso Álvarez Izquierdo

=== UEFA Europa League ===
==== Group stage ====
Pos	Team	Pld	W	D	L	GF	GA	GD	Pts	Qualification
1	(Spain) Villarreal	6	3	2	1	10	6	+4	11	Advance to knockout phase
2	(Kazakhstan) Astana	6	3	1	2	10	7	+3	10	Advance to knockout phase
3	(Czech Republic) Slavia Prague	6	2	2	2	6	6	0	8	
4	(Israel) Maccabi Tel Aviv	6	1	1	4	1	8	−7	4	

Source: UEFA
Rules for classification: Group stage tiebreakers

14 September 2017 1	Villarreal (Spain)	3–1	(Kazakhstan) Astana	Villarreal, Spain
19:00 CEST (UTC+2)	Sansone 16'; Bakambu 75'; Cheryshev 77'; Mario Gaspar (yellow card) 88'	Report	Logvinenko (yellow card) 57', (goal) 68'; Aničić (yellow card) 71'	Stadium: La Cerámica; Attendance: 14,670; Referee: Srđan Jovanović (Serbia)

28 September 2017 2	Maccabi Tel Aviv (Israel)	0–0	(Spain) Villarreal	Netanya, Israel
21:05 CEST (UTC+2)	Blackman (yellow card) 15'; Yitzhaki (yellow card) 90+2'	Report	Costa (yellow card) 58'	Stadium: Netanya Stadium (Note: Maccabi Tel Aviv play their home matches at Netanya Stadium, Netanya, instead of their regular stadium Bloomfield Stadium, Tel Aviv, due to renovation.); Attendance: 11,865; Referee: Craig Pawson (England)

19 October 2017 3	Villarreal (Spain)	2–2	(Czech Republic) Slavia Prague	Villarreal, Spain
21:05 CEST (UTC+2)	Soriano (yellow card) 31'; Trigueros 41'; Bacca 44'; Guerra (yellow card) 83'; Costa (yellow card) 90+1'	Report	Necid 18'; Danny 30'; Bořil (yellow card) 90+2'	Stadium: La Cerámica; Attendance: 15,634; Referee: Svein Oddvar Moen (Norway)

2 November 2017 4	Slavia Prague (Czech Republic)	0–2	(Spain) Villarreal	Prague, Czech Republic
19:00 CET (UTC+1)	Bořil (yellow card) 88'	Report	Bacca 15'; Bakambu (yellow card) 57'; Deli 89' (o.g.)	Stadium: Eden Arena; Attendance: 18,403; Referee: Bobby Madden (Scotland)

23 November 2017 5	Astana (Kazakhstan)	2–3	(Spain) Villarreal	Astana, Kazakhstan
21:05 CET (UTC+1)	Kabananga 22', (yellow card) 90+5'; Shomko (yellow card) 43'; Mayewski (yellow card) 70'; Twumasi 88'; Grahovac (yellow card) 90+3'	Report	Raba 39'; Marín (yellow card) 63'; Bakambu 65', 83'; Sansone (yellow card) 76'	Stadium: Astana Arena; Attendance: 29,800; Referee: Gediminas Mažeika (Lithuania)

7 December 2017 6	Villarreal (Spain)	0–1	(Israel) Maccabi Tel Aviv	Villarreal, Spain
19:00 CET (UTC+1)		Report	Tibi (yellow card) 13'; Peretz (yellow card) 33'; Blackman 60'	Stadium: La Cerámica; Attendance: 12,613; Referee: Mads-Kristoffer Kristoffersen (Denmark)

==== Knockout phase ====
===== Round of 32 =====
15 February 2018 First leg	Lyon (France)	3–1	(Spain) Villarreal	Décines-Charpieu, France
21:05 CET (UTC+1)	Ndombele 46'; Fekir 49'; Marçal (yellow card) 73'; Depay 82'	Report	Álvaro (yellow card) 42'; Cheryshev (yellow card) 43'; Fornals 63'; Rodri (yellow card) 90+1'	Stadium: Groupama Stadium; Attendance: 46,846; Referee: Viktor Kassai (Hungary)

22 February 2018 Second leg	Villarreal (Spain)	0–1 (1–4 agg.)	(France) Lyon	Villarreal, Spain
19:00 CET (UTC+1)	Álvaro (yellow card) 30'; Fuego (yellow card) 59'; Costa (yellow card) 78' (yellow-red card) 78'; Castillejo (yellow card) 89'; Mario Gaspar (yellow card) 90'	Report	Marcelo (yellow card) 36'; Fekir (yellow card) 38'; Traoré 85'; Depay (yellow card) 89'	Stadium: La Cerámica; Attendance: 17,028; Referee: Luca Banti (Italy)

== Statistics ==
=== Appearances and goals ===
Last updated on 20 May 2018.

No.	Pos	Nat	Player	Total		La Liga		Copa del Rey		Europa League	
No.	Pos	Nat	Player	Apps	Goals	Apps	Goals	Apps	Goals	Apps	Goals
Goalkeepers
1	GK	(Spain) ESP	Sergio Asenjo	26	0	23	0	1	0	2	0
13	GK	(Spain) ESP	Andrés Fernández	3	0	3	0	0	0	0	0
25	GK	(Argentina) ARG	Mariano Barbosa	21	0	12+1	0	2	0	6	0
31	GK	(Spain) ESP	Ander Cantero	1	0	0	0	1	0	0	0
Defenders
2	DF	(Spain) ESP	Mario Gaspar	37	2	31+1	2	0	0	5	0
3	DF	(Spain) ESP	Álvaro	38	0	32+1	0	2	0	3	0
4	DF	(Portugal) POR	Rúben Semedo	5	0	3+1	0	0	0	1	0
5	DF	(Spain) ESP	Adrián Marín	10	0	4+1	0	2	0	3	0
6	DF	(Spain) ESP	Víctor Ruiz	34	2	27	2	2	0	5	0
11	DF	(Spain) ESP	Jaume Costa	36	0	29+1	0	1	0	5	0
22	DF	(Serbia) SRB	Antonio Rukavina	24	0	14+3	0	4	0	3	0
23	DF	(Italy) ITA	Daniele Bonera	21	0	14+1	0	1	0	5	0
30	DF	(Spain) ESP	Pau Torres	6	0	0+2	0	3	0	1	0
38	DF	(Spain) ESP	Genís Montolio	1	0	0	0	0	0	1	0
Midfielders
7	MF	(Russia) RUS	Denis Cheryshev	32	4	9+15	2	2+1	1	1+4	1
8	MF	(Spain) ESP	Pablo Fornals	46	4	30+5	3	1+3	0	7	1
10	MF	(Spain) ESP	Samu Castillejo	38	6	25+5	6	2+1	0	2+3	0
12	MF	(Saudi Arabia) KSA	Salem Al-Dawsari	1	0	0+1	0	0	0	0	0
14	MF	(Spain) ESP	Manu Trigueros	44	4	32+2	3	2+1	0	7	1
16	MF	(Spain) ESP	Rodri	47	1	36+1	1	2+2	0	5+1	0
19	MF	(Spain) ESP	Javi Fuego	12	0	6+5	0	0	0	1	0
20	MF	(Italy) ITA	Roberto Soriano	30	0	11+11	0	2	0	4+2	0
21	MF	(Spain) ESP	Bruno	0	0	0	0	0	0	0	0
26	MF	(Uruguay) URU	Ramiro Guerra	10	0	0+4	0	2	0	3+1	0
28	MF	(Spain) ESP	Raba	29	4	14+7	2	3+1	1	1+3	1
33	MF	(Spain) ESP	Chuca	7	0	1+3	0	1	0	1+1	0
35	MF	(Argentina) ARG	Leo Suárez	3	0	0+1	0	1	0	0+1	0
37	MF	(Spain) ESP	Pedrito	1	0	0	0	0	0	0+1	0
40	MF	(Spain) ESP	Manu Morlanes	1	0	0	0	0	0	1	0
51	MF	(Spain) ESP	Sergio Lozano	1	0	0	0	0	0	0+1	0
Forwards
9	FW	(Colombia) COL	Carlos Bacca	44	18	30+5	15	1+2	1	6	2
15	FW	(Turkey) TUR	Enes Ünal	31	5	11+12	5	3	0	3+2	0
18	FW	(Italy) ITA	Nicola Sansone	22	6	5+13	5	1	0	2+1	1
24	FW	(Colombia) COL	Roger Martínez	9	1	2+6	1	0+1	0	0	0
27	FW	(Spain) ESP	Mario González	2	0	0+2	0	0	0	0	0
34	FW	(Spain) ESP	Darío Poveda	2	0	0+1	0	0	0	1	0
Players who have made an appearance or had a squad number this season but have left the club
17	FW	(Democratic Republic of the Congo) COD	Cédric Bakambu	21	14	15	9	1	2	2+3	3
24	MF	(Senegal) SEN	Alfred N'Diaye	2	0	1+1	0	0	0	0	0

=== Cards ===
Accounts for all competitions. Last updated on 19 December 2017.

No.	Pos.	Name	Yellow card	Red card
2	DF	(Spain) Mario Gaspar	1	0
3	DF	(Spain) Álvaro	6	0
5	DF	(Spain) Adrián Marín	2	0
6	DF	(Spain) Víctor Ruiz	5	0
8	MF	(Spain) Pablo Fornals	2	0
9	FW	(Colombia) Carlos Bacca	3	0
11	DF	(Spain) Jaume Costa	8	0
14	MF	(Spain) Manu Trigueros	8	0
16	MF	(Spain) Rodri	4	0
17	FW	(Democratic Republic of the Congo) Cédric Bakambu	6	0
18	FW	(Italy) Nicola Sansone	1	0
20	MF	(Italy) Roberto Soriano	4	0
22	DF	(Serbia) Antonio Rukavina	2	0
23	DF	(Italy) Daniele Bonera	2	0
26	MF	(Spain) Ramiro Guerra	1	0
28	MF	(Spain) Raba	1	1
33	MF	(Spain) Víctor Moya	1	0

=== Clean sheets ===
Last updated on 19 December 2017.

Number	Nation	Name	Matches Played	La Liga	Copa del Rey	Europa League	Total
1	(Spain)	Sergio Asenjo	3	1	1	0	2
13	(Spain)	Andrés Fernández	2	0	0	0	0
25	(Argentina)	Mariano Barbosa	19	5	0	2	7
31	(Spain)	Ander Cantero	1	0	0	0	0
TOTALS				6	1	2	9
