= Risto Lakić =

Montenegrin footballer (born 1983)

Personal information
- Full name: Risto Lakić
- Date of birth: 3 July 1983 (age 43)
- Place of birth: Titograd, SR Montenegro, Yugoslavia
- Height: 1.80 m (5 ft 11 in)
- Position: Right back

Youth career
- Iskra Danilovgrad
- Budućnost Podgorica

Senior career*
Years	Team	Apps	(Gls)
2003–2007	Budućnost Podgorica	113	(1)
2008	Partizan	2	(0)
2008–2010	Vojvodina	13	(0)
2011	Mogren	14	(0)
2012	Čukarički	10	(0)
2014	Mladost Podgorica	12	(0)
Total		164	(1)

International career
2004–2005	Serbia and Montenegro U21 (Note: Only official UEFA matches included)	2	(0)
2007–2008	Montenegro	7	(0)
- * Club domestic league appearances and goals

Risto Lakić (Cyrillic: Ристо Лакић; born 3 July 1983) is a Montenegrin retired professional footballer who played as a right back.

== Club career ==
Lakić made his first football steps at Iskra Danilovgrad, before joining the youth ranks of Budućnost Podgorica. He was a team member that won promotion to the First League of Serbia and Montenegro, together with Nikola Vujović, Milan Purović and Igor Burzanović, among others. In the following two seasons (2004–2006), Lakić played regularly for his club, becoming one of the most promising defenders in the country.

In January 2008, Lakić was transferred to Partizan, signing a two-year contract, with an option for a third year. He rejoined his teammate Mladen Božović, who moved in the same direction earlier that month. However, Lakić made only two competitive appearances for Partizan, as they won the double, before leaving the club in the 2008 summer transfer window. He subsequently moved to Vojvodina, recording only 13 league appearances in the next two years (2008–2010).

In June 2011, Lakić returned to his homeland and joined Mogren. He again moved to Serbia and signed with Čukarički in the summer of 2012. After another year without competitive football, Lakić signed with Mladost Podgorica in January 2014.

== International career ==
Lakić represented Serbia and Montenegro at under-21 level. He then played for Montenegro at full international level, making his debut in his country's first ever competitive match on 24 March 2007, a friendly against Hungary in Podgorica. He has earned a total of 7 caps, scoring no goals. His final international was a March 2008 friendly against Norway.

== Honours ==
Budućnost Podgorica

- Second League of Serbia and Montenegro: 2003–04

Partizan

- Serbian SuperLiga: 2007–08
- Serbian Cup: 2007–08
