= Jaume Costa =

Spanish footballer

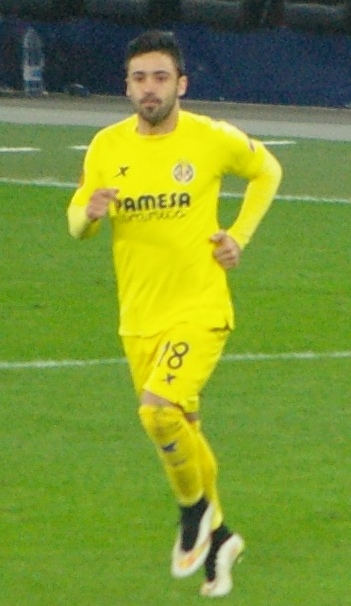
- Costa with Villarreal in 2015

Personal information
- Full name: Jaume Vicent Costa Jordá
- Date of birth: 18 March 1988 (age 38)
- Place of birth: Valencia, Spain
- Height: 1.71 m (5 ft 7 in)
- Position: Left-back

Youth career
- Valencia

Senior career*
Years	Team	Apps	(Gls)
2007–2010	Valencia B	71	(4)
2009–2010	→ Cádiz (loan)	15	(0)
2010–2012	Villarreal B	65	(3)
2012–2021	Villarreal	211	(5)
2019–2020	→ Valencia (loan)	19	(0)
2021–2024	Mallorca	87	(0)
2024–2025	Albacete	14	(0)
Total		482	(12)

International career
2004	Spain U16	4	(0)
2004–2005	Spain U17	5	(0)
- * Club domestic league appearances and goals

Jaume Vicent Costa Jordá (Valencian pronunciation: [ˈdʒawme ˈkɔsta]; born 18 March 1988) is a Spanish former professional footballer who played as a left-back.

He spent most of his career at Villarreal, making 268 appearances, and also had two spells with Valencia.

== Club career ==
=== Valencia ===
Born in Valencia, Valencian Community, Costa played youth football with local giants Valencia CF, but almost exclusively in the B side, with whom he competed in both Segunda División B and Tercera División. He made his only first-team appearance on 4 December 2008 in a UEFA Cup home game against Club Brugge KV, and featured the first 55 minutes of the 1–1 group stage draw before being substituted by Vicente Rodríguez.

Costa was loaned to Cádiz CF of Segunda División for the 2009–10 season, appearing in less than half of the matches and also suffering relegation.

=== Villarreal ===
Costa joined neighbours Villarreal CF in the summer of 2010, being initially assigned to the reserves also in the second division. He played his first match in La Liga with the main squad on 4 March 2012, featuring the full 90 minutes in a 2–1 away loss against Real Zaragoza. At the end of the campaign both the first and the second squads dropped down a tier, even though the latter finished in a comfortable 12th position, with 29 games and one goal from the player.

In late August 2013, with the Yellow Submarine back in the top flight, Costa renewed his contract until June 2017. He scored his first goal in the competition on 10 May 2014, his team's last in a 4–0 home win over Rayo Vallecano. In January 2017, his link was again extended to 2021.

On 13 August 2019, Costa returned to Valencia on a season-long loan. He made his debut four days later, starting in a 1–1 draw against Real Sociedad at the Mestalla Stadium; the decade-long difference between two appearances set a club record previously held by Juan Sánchez in the 1990s.

Costa was released by Villarreal at the end of 2020–21, after his contract expired.

=== Mallorca ===
On 7 July 2021, Costa joined newly-promoted RCD Mallorca on a two-year deal. He totalled 95 appearances during his three-year spell, reaching the final of the Copa del Rey in the 2023–24 season.

=== Later career ===
On 7 August 2024, aged 36, the free agent Costa signed a one-year contract with second-tier club Albacete Balompié. He missed most of his only season due to a fibula fracture.

== Career statistics ==
As of match played 26 May 2024

Appearances and goals by club, season and competition
Club	Season	League			Cup		Continental		Other		Total	
Club	Season	Division	Apps	Goals	Apps	Goals	Apps	Goals	Apps	Goals	Apps	Goals
Valencia B	2007–08	Tercera División	35	0	—		—		—		35	0
Valencia B	2008–09	Segunda División B	36	4	—		—		—		36	4
Valencia B	Total		71	4	0	0	0	0	0	0	71	4
Valencia	2008–09	La Liga	0	0	0	0	1 (Note: Appearances in UEFA Europa League)	0	—		1	0
Cádiz (loan)	2009–10	Segunda División	15	0	0	0	—		—		15	0
Villarreal B	2010–11	Segunda División	36	1	—		—		—		36	1
Villarreal B	2011–12	Segunda División	29	1	—		—		—		29	1
Villarreal B	Total		65	2	0	0	0	0	0	0	65	2
Villarreal	2011–12	La Liga	6	0	1	0	0	0	—		7	0
Villarreal	2012–13	Segunda División	32	0	1	0	—		—		33	0
Villarreal	2013–14	La Liga	30	1	2	0	—		—		32	1
Villarreal	2014–15	La Liga	29	1	7	0	7	0	—		43	1
Villarreal	2015–16	La Liga	18	1	1	0	8	0	—		27	1
Villarreal	2016–17	La Liga	31	1	2	0	3 (Note: One appearance in UEFA Champions League, two appearances in UEFA Europa League)	0	—		36	1
Villarreal	2017–18	La Liga	30	0	1	0	5	0	—		36	0
Villarreal	2018–19	La Liga	21	1	2	0	6	0	—		29	1
Villarreal	2020–21	La Liga	14	0	3	1	8	0	—		25	1
Villarreal	Total		211	5	20	1	37	0	0	0	268	6
Valencia (loan)	2019–20	La Liga	19	0	3	0	3 (Note: Appearances in UEFA Champions League)	0	0	0	25	0
Mallorca	2021–22	La Liga	25	0	3	0	0	0	—		28	0
Mallorca	2022–23	La Liga	32	0	1	0	—		—		33	0
Mallorca	2023–24	La Liga	30	0	4	0	—		—		34	0
Mallorca	Total		87	0	8	0	0	0	0	0	95	0
Career total			468	11	31	1	41	0	0	0	540	12

== Honours ==
Villarreal

- UEFA Europa League: 2020–21
