= 2007–08 Serbian SuperLiga =

2nd season of Serbian SuperLiga

Meridian SuperLiga
- Season: 2007–08
- Champions: Partizan; 1st SuperLiga title 20th domestic title
- Relegated: Bežanija; Mladost Lučani; Smederevo
- Champions League: Partizan (second qualifying round)
- UEFA Cup: Red Star; Vojvodina; Borac Čačak
- Matches: 198
- Goals: 452 (2.28 per match)
- Top goalscorer: Nenad Jestrović (13)
- Biggest home win: Red Star 5–0 Napredak (2 April 2008); Vojvodina 5–0 Borac Čačak (30 April 2008)
- Biggest away win: Banat 0–4 Napredak (3 May 2008)
- Highest scoring: Bežanija 6–2 Banat (29 March 2008)

Location of teams in the Serbian SuperLiga 2007–08

The 2007–08 Serbian SuperLiga (known as the Meridian SuperLiga for sponsorship reasons) was the second season since its establishment in 2006. Red Star Belgrade were the defending SuperLiga champions, having won their twenty-fifth national title the season before.

The SuperLiga changed its format from this season. The League was no longer divided into a playoff and play-out group midway through the campaign. Instead the 12 teams played each other three times in a conventional league format. For the SuperLiga's inaugural season and this one the league had been named the Meridian SuperLiga. This however, was the last season that Meridian Bank had sponsorship rights to the SuperLiga. The rights to the Serbian SuperLiga were bought by Jelen and starting from the 2008–09 season the league was known as the Jelen SuperLiga.

== European placing ==
Like in many previous seasons, the allocation of European spots based on the final 2007–08 league and cup standings turned out to be messy.

According to the propositions, the second UEFA Cup spot is supposed to go to the Serbian Cup winner. However, since the Cup was won by FK Partizan, a club that also won the league, the second UEFA Cup spot went to the 2007–08 Serbian Cup finalist FK Zemun. This created problems, since FK Zemun couldn't obtain the UEFA licence for the year due to poor financial situation at the club, and their UEFA Cup spot went to the 4th placed league team - Borac Čačak. Now, since Borac Čačak earned a 2008 Intertoto Cup berth based on finishing 4th in the league, they now passed their Intertoto Cup spot down to 9th placed OFK Beograd because Napredak Kruševac, Čukarički, Mladost Lučani, and Hajduk Kula (5th, 6th, 7th, and 8th placed teams in the league, respectively) didn't want it.

This created a bizarre situation whereby a team that finished fourth from the bottom barely avoiding relegation playoff (OFK Beograd) still got to play in the 2008 Intertoto Cup.

== Participating clubs and their stadia ==
The following twelve clubs competed in the 2007–08 Serbian SuperLiga season.

Team	Stadium	Capacity
Crvena zvezda	Stadion Crvena Zvezda	55,000
Partizan	Partizan Stadium	32,710
Vojvodina	Karađorđe Stadium	20,000
Banat	Karađorđev Park Stadium	18,700
Smederevo	Smederevo City Stadium	17,200
OFK Beograd	Omladinski Stadium	16,000
Hajduk Kula	Stadion Hajduk	12,000
Napredak	Kruševac Stadium	10,811
Bežanija	Bežanija Stadium	9,350
Mladost Lučani	Stadion Mladost	8,000
Borac Čačak	Čačak Stadium	7,600
Čukarički	Čukarički Stadium	6,600

== League table ==
Pos	Team	Pld	W	D	L	GF	GA	GD	Pts	Qualification or relegation
1	Partizan (C)	33	24	8	1	63	23	+40	80	Qualification for Champions League second qualifying round
2	Red Star	33	21	12	0	65	22	+43	75	Qualification for UEFA Cup second qualifying round
3	Vojvodina	33	18	8	7	53	33	+20	62	Qualification for UEFA Cup first qualifying round
4	Borac Čačak	33	12	10	11	29	33	−4	46	Qualification for UEFA Cup first qualifying round
5	Napredak	33	11	8	14	25	33	−8	41	
6	Čukarički	33	10	10	13	31	32	−1	40	
7	Mladost Lučani	33	8	14	11	32	41	−9	38	
8	Hajduk Kula	33	8	13	12	25	31	−6	37	
9	OFK Beograd	33	9	9	15	31	45	−14	36	Qualification for Intertoto Cup second round
10	Smederevo	33	10	6	17	33	44	−11	36	Qualification for relegation play-off
11	Banat (R)	33	6	10	17	34	57	−23	28	Relegation to Serbian First League
12	Bežanija (R)	33	5	4	24	31	58	−27	19	Relegation to Serbian First League

Source: soccerway.com
(C) Champions; (R) Relegated

== Results ==
The schedule consists of three rounds. During the first two rounds, each team played each other once home and away for a total of 22 matches. The pairings of the third round were then set according to the standings after the first two rounds, giving every team a third game against each opponent for a total of 33 games per team.

=== First and second round ===
Home \ Away	BAN	BEŽ	BOR	ČUK	HAJ	MLA	NAP	OFK	PAR	RSB	SME	VOJ
Banat Zrenjanin		2–1	2–1	1–3	1–2	0–0	0–1	2–1	0–2	2–2	2–3	1–1
Bežanija	6–2		1–2	1–2	1–0	0–0	2–1	1–2	0–2	0–1	2–0	0–1
Borac Čačak	0–0	4–1		1–1	2–0	2–0	1–0	2–0	0–1	0–0	0–2	2–4
Čukarički	2–1	0–2	0–0		1–1	2–0	0–0	0–2	0–3	0–1	2–2	1–0
Hajduk Kula	0–0	1–0	0–0	1–1		2–2	2–0	1–0	0–1	0–2	3–1	1–2
Mladost	1–1	3–0	1–0	2–1	0–0		1–1	2–2	1–4	1–1	3–2	0–1
Napredak Kruševac	0–2	1–0	0–0	0–2	1–0	0–1		2–0	0–2	0–1	3–1	0–1
OFK Beograd	0–2	1–0	2–0	0–3	3–1	1–1	1–1		0–1	0–2	1–2	0–0
Partizan	4–2	2–0	0–0	1–1	2–1	4–0	3–1	5–1		2–2	1–0	3–3
Red Star Belgrade	2–0	2–0	4–0	0–0	1–1	2–2	1–1	2–0	4–1		1–0	1–1
Smederevo	0–1	2–1	0–1	1–0	1–0	0–0	1–1	0–1	1–1	2–5		1–0
Vojvodina	1–0	3–1	1–2	0–0	1–0	2–1	2–0	1–1	0–1	1–1	2–1	

Source: soccerway.com
Legend: Blue = home team win; Yellow = draw; Red = away team win.

=== Third round ===
Home \ Away	BAN	BEŽ	BOR	ČUK	HAJ	NAP	MLA	OFK	PAR	RSB	SME	VOJ
Banat Zrenjanin			0–1			0–4	2–2	1–2		1–2		
Bežanija	3–3				0–1	0–1		2–2			1–2	
Borac Čačak		2–0		2–1		1–1		0–0		0–2	1–0	
Čukarički	2–0	1–0			0–1		3–0		0–1			1–3
Hajduk Kula	0–0		1–1			2–0	0–0			1–1		
Napredak Kruševac				2–0				1–0	0–1		1–0	1–0
Mladost		3–0	2–1			0–0		3–1		0–1	0–1	
OFK Beograd				1–1	1–1				1–3		2–1	2–0
Partizan	3–1	2–2	1–0		1–0		2–0			1–1		
Red Star Belgrade		4–1		1–0		5–0		1–0			4–3	5–1
Smederevo	1–1			1–0	0–0				0–1			1–2
Vojvodina	4–1		5–0		4–1		2–0		3–2		1–1	

Source: soccerway.com
Legend: Blue = home team win; Yellow = draw; Red = away team win.

== Top scorers ==
Rank	Player	Team	Goals
1	(Serbia) Nenad Jestrović	Red Star	13
2	(Senegal) Lamine Diarra	Partizan	12
2	(Montenegro) Stevan Jovetić	Partizan	12
2	(Serbia) Predrag Ranđelović	Bežanija	12
5	(Serbia) Gojko Kačar	Vojvodina	11

=== Hat-tricks ===
Player	For	Against	Result	Date
(Serbia) Nenad Jestrović	Red Star	Smederevo	2-5	11 November 2007
(Chad) Misdongarde Betolngar	Red Star	Napredak	5–0	2 April 2008
(Serbia) Nenad Milijaš	Red Star	Bežanija	4-1	12 April 2008

== Winning squad ==
Champions: FK Partizan (coach: Miroslav Đukić until 18 round, Slaviša Jokanović from 18 round)

Players(League matches/league goals)

- (Serbia) Zoran Tošić (32/8)
- (Senegal) Lamine Diarra (31/12)
- (Serbia) Đorđe Lazić (30/6)
- (Portugal) Almani Moreira (28/7)
- (Bosnia and Herzegovina) Darko Maletić (28/0)
- (Montenegro) Stevan Jovetić (27/12)
- (Brazil) Juca (25/5)
- (Serbia) Nemanja Rnić (25/0)
- (Montenegro) Darko Božović (24/0)
- (Serbia) Ivan Obradović (19/0)
- (North Macedonia) Aleksandar Lazevski (16/2)
- (Serbia) Žarko Lazetić (15/1)
- (Serbia) Nikola Mitrović (15/0)
- (Serbia) Nenad Đorđević (14/6)
- (Portugal) Ednilson (14/0)
- (Montenegro) Mladen Božović (10/0)
- (Serbia) Srđa Knežević (10/0)
- (Serbia) Milan Vještica (9/0)
- (Serbia) Marko Jovanović (9/0)
- (North Macedonia) Dragan Čadikovski (7/2)
- (Montenegro) Slaven Stjepanović (7/1)
- (Montenegro) Marko Ćetković (6/0)
- (Serbia) Milovan Sikimić (5/0)
- (Montenegro) Risto Lakić (2/0)

== Relegation playoff ==
The third-placed team form the bottom in 2007–08 SuperLiga (FK Smederevo) plays the winner of the 4-team playoff consisting of 3rd to 6th placed teams from 2007 to 2008 Serbian First League (FK Rad). The playoff has a home-and-away tie format

- 7 June 2008, FK Rad - FK Smederevo 3:1
- 11 June 2008, FK Smederevo - FK Rad 2:1

== Promoted teams ==
The following teams were promoted to the Meridian SuperLiga at the end of the 2007–08 season:

- Javor Ivanjica - Serbian First League champion
- Jagodina - Serbian First League runner-up
- Rad - Winner of the playoffs against Smederevo

== Relegated teams ==
The following teams were relegated to the Serbian First League at the end of the 2007–08 season based on their performance:

- Bežanija - Automatically relegated after finishing the season in the 12th position (last place).
- Banat Zrenjanin - Automatically relegated after finishing in the 11th position (second last place).
- Smederevo - As a result of finishing 10th (third place from the bottom) entered and lost relegation playoffs against FK Rad (a team that won the chance to compete for promotion from First League amongst the 4 teams that finished 3rd to 6th inclusive)

However, following speculation on 29 June 2008 that 7th placed SuperLiga team - Mladost from Lučani - might decline the opportunity to compete in 2008–09 SuperLiga season due to lacking the funds required to compete at the top level, the official confirmation of their decision came on 2 July 2008. The possibility of Mladost Lučani being relegated two levels down to Srpska Liga as punishment was initially talked about, nut the club was eventually moved only one level down to First League for the 2008–09 season.

By the decision of Serbian Football Association (FSS), the relegated team that ended up keeping its SuperLiga status as a result of Mladost's withdrawal became 11th placed Banat Zrenjanin, not the 10th placed FK Smederevo. The FA made the decision based on their opinion that Banat Zrenjanin has better support of the sponsors and its community (city of Zrenjanin) than does FK Smederevo.

The decision caused a lot of controversy and protest from FK Smederevo officials who claimed they should've been given the opportunity to retain the SuperLiga status after Mladost's withdrawal. They even launched an official appeal with UEFA, but it got rejected.

So, in the end, the three 2007–08 SuperLiga teams that will not compete in the 2008–09 SuperLiga season are:

- Bežanija
- Mladost Lučani
- Smederevo
