= 2010 UEFA European Under-19 Championship elite qualification =

2010 UEFA European Under-19 Championship (Elite Round) was the second round of qualifications for the final tournament of 2010 UEFA European Under-19 Championship. The 28 teams that advanced from the qualifying round were distributed into seven groups of four teams each, with each group contested in a round-robin format, with one of the four teams hosting all six group games. The seven group-winning teams automatically qualified for the final tournament in France.

Pot A	Pot B	Pot C	Pot D
Italy; Norway; Serbia; Portugal; England; Netherlands; Croatia	Russia; Turkey; Ukraine; Switzerland; Hungary; Germany; Scotland	Belgium; Czech Republic; Republic of Ireland; Spain; Denmark; Slovakia; Romania	Greece; Austria; Azerbaijan; Bosnia and Herzegovina; Northern Ireland; Poland; Montenegro

The hosts of the seven one-venue mini-tournament groups are indicated below in italics.

The matches were played between 14 April–31 May 2010.

== Tiebreaker rules for qualification groups ==
Per uefa.com the criteria used to rank two or more teams even on points are:

1. Points earned in head-to-head matches
2. Goal difference in head-to-head matches
3. Goals scored in head-to-head matches
4. Goal difference in all group matches
5. Goals scored in all group matches
6. Drawing of lots
- If head-to-head criteria eliminate one team from a three- or four-way tie, then revert to the first step with the remaining teams.
- If two teams are tied and play against each other in their last group match, then penalty kicks will be used instead of the criteria listed above.

== Group 1 ==
Team	Pld	W	D	L	GF	GA	GD	Pts
Croatia	3	3	0	0	6	1	+5	9
Belgium	3	2	0	1	7	4	+3	6
Scotland	3	1	0	2	5	3	+2	3
Montenegro	3	0	0	3	1	11	−10	0

19 May 2010
14:30 CET

Croatia	2 – 1	Belgium
Maglica 45+3'; Ozobić 68'	Report	Van Eenoo 50'

Stadion Lučko, Lučko
Referee: Marcin Szulc (Poland)

19 May 2010
14:30 CET

Scotland	4 – 0	Montenegro
McHugh 13'; Robinson 29'; Armstrong 74', 85'	Report

SRC Velika Gorica, Velika Gorica
Referee: Marios Panayi (Cyprus)

21 May 2010
17:00 CET

Belgium	2 – 1	Scotland
Badibanga 69'; Sterckx 90+2'	Report	Inman 87'

Gradski stadion, Vrbovec
Referee: Artur Soares Dias (Portugal)

21 May 2010
19:00 CET

Montenegro	0 – 3	Croatia
	Report	Ozobić 34'; Tičinović 84'; Maglica 90'

Stadium Karlovac, Karlovac
Referee: Marios Panayi (Cyprus)

24 May 2010
17:00 CET

Scotland	0 – 1	Croatia
	Report	Andrijašević 19'

Stadion ŠRC Zaprešić, Zaprešić
Referee: Artur Soares Dias (Portugal)

24 May 2010
17:00 CET

Montenegro	1 – 4	Belgium
Van Damme 32' (o.g.)	Report	Van Damme 9'; Lestienne 16'; Badibanga 28'; Bruno 73'

SRC Velika Gorica, Velika Gorica
Referee: Marcin Szulc (Poland)

== Group 2 ==
Team	Pld	W	D	L	GF	GA	GD	Pts
Portugal	3	2	1	0	7	4	+3	7
Greece	3	2	1	0	4	1	+3	7
Hungary	3	1	0	2	5	4	+1	3
Romania	3	0	0	3	1	8	−7	0

3 May 2010
17:00 CET

Portugal	3 – 1	Romania
S. Oliveira 2'; N. Oliveira 9'; Alex 68'	Report	Matei 10'

Globall Football Park, Telki
Referee: Armen Minasyan (Armenia)

3 May 2010
17:00 CET

Hungary	0 – 1	Greece
	Report	Vellios 83'

Tatabánya Városi, Tatabánya
Referee: Sergei Karasev (Russia)

5 May 2010
17:00 CET

Portugal	1 – 1	Greece
Baldé 83'	Report	Potouridis 90+2'

Globall Football Park, Telki
Referee: Harald Lechner (Austria)

5 May 2010
17:00 CET

Romania	0 – 3	Hungary
	Report	Simon 9', 83'; Skriba 90+2' (pen.)

Tatabánya Városi, Tatabánya
Referee: Armen Minasyan (Armenia)

8 May 2010
13:00 CET

Hungary	2 – 3	Portugal
Kulcsár 27'; Skriba 32'	Report	Agra 21'; Alex 43'; N. Oliveira 59'

Tatabánya Városi, Tatabánya
Referee: Sergei Karasev (Russia)

8 May 2010
13:00 CET

Greece	2 – 0	Romania
Mantalos 61', 86'	Report

Globall Football Park, Telki
Referee: Harald Lechner (Austria)

== Group 3 ==
Team	Pld	W	D	L	GF	GA	GD	Pts
England	3	2	1	0	6	1	+5	7
Republic of Ireland	3	2	0	1	2	1	+1	6
Ukraine	3	1	1	1	5	3	+2	4
Bosnia and Herzegovina	3	0	0	3	1	9	−8	0

26 May 2010
12:00 CET

England	1 – 0	Republic of Ireland
Parrett 37'	Report

FFU Training complex, Kyiv
Referee: Liran Liany (Israel)

26 May 2010
16:00 CET

Ukraine	4 – 1	Bosnia and Herzegovina
Chaykovskiy 10', 43' (pen.); Zubko 56'; Sydorchuk 72'	Report	Pandža 45'

Borex Stadium, Borodianka
Referee: Lorenc Jemini (Albania)

28 May 2010
14:00 CET

England	4 – 0	Bosnia and Herzegovina
Noble 2'; Phillips 18'; Bostock 69'; Delfouneso 79'	Report

FFU Training complex, Kyiv
Referee: Lorenc Jemini (Albania)

28 May 2010
17:00 CET

Ukraine	0 – 1	Republic of Ireland
	Report	Clifford 60' (pen.)

Borex Stadium, Borodianka
Referee: David Fernández Borbalán (Spain)

31 May 2010
17:00 CET

Ukraine	1 – 1	England
Zubko 81'	Report	Parrett 83'

Borex Stadium, Borodianka
Referee: David Fernández Borbalán (Spain)

31 May 2010
17:00 CET

Republic of Ireland	1 – 0	Bosnia and Herzegovina
Clifford 68' (pen.)	Report

FFU Training complex, Kyiv
Referee: Liran Liany (Israel)

== Group 4 ==
Team	Pld	W	D	L	GF	GA	GD	Pts
Spain	3	2	1	0	8	3	+5	7
Turkey	3	2	0	1	6	4	+2	6
Norway	3	0	2	1	3	4	−1	2
Azerbaijan	3	0	1	2	1	7	−6	1

14 April 2010
15:00 CET

Norway	1 – 1	Spain
Lehne Olsen 44'	Report	Rochina 62'

Anadolu University, Eskişehir
Referee: Vlado Glođović (Serbia)

14 April 2010
15:00 CET

Turkey	2 – 0	Azerbaijan
Çolak 55' (pen.), 58'	Report

Eskişehir Atatürk Stadium, Eskişehir
Referee: Antony Gautier (France)

16 April 2010
15:00 CET

Norway	1 – 1	Azerbaijan
Lehne Olsen 44'	Report	Hasanov 81'

Anadolu University, Eskişehir
Referee: Alexandre Kostadinov (Bulgaria)

16 April 2010
15:00 CET

Spain	3 – 2	Turkey
Keko 8'; Thiago 45'; Romeu 55'	Report	Uysal 14'; Demir 48'

Eskişehir Atatürk Stadium, Eskişehir
Referee: Antony Gautier (France)

19 April 2010
15:00 CET

Turkey	2 – 1	Norway
Çolak 16'; Dikmen 64'	Report	Ringstad 21'

Eskişehir Atatürk Stadium, Eskişehir
Referee: Vlado Glođović (Serbia)

19 April 2010
15:00 CET

Azerbaijan	0 – 4	Spain
	Report	Rochina 29', 31'; Thiago 36' (pen.); Rodrigo 70'

Anadolu University, Eskişehir
Referee: Alexandre Kostadinov (Bulgaria)

== Group 5 ==
Team	Pld	W	D	L	GF	GA	GD	Pts
Italy	3	2	0	1	6	5	+1	6
Russia	3	1	2	0	8	6	+2	5
Czech Republic	3	1	1	1	6	6	0	4
Northern Ireland	3	0	1	2	5	8	−3	1

21 May 2010
14:00 CET

Italy	2 – 0	Czech Republic
Destro 27'; Borini 75'	Report

Spartak Stadium, Shchyolkovo
Referee: Domagoj Vučkov (Croatia)

21 May 2010
15:00 CET

Russia	2 – 2	Northern Ireland
Gatagov 17'; Kokorin 49'	Report	Norwood 82', 90+3'

Krylia Sovetov stadium, Moscow
Referee: Michael Lerjeus (Sweden)

23 May 2010
15:00 CET

Italy	3 – 2	Northern Ireland
Destro 40', 66'; Tremolada 42'	Report	Norwood 32' (pen.); C. McLaughlin 58'

Spartak Stadium, Shchyolkovo
Referee: Istvan Kovacs (Romania)

23 May 2010
15:00 CET

Czech Republic	3 – 3	Russia
Krejčí 28'; Skalák 32'; Kadlec 78'	Report	Gatagov 11'; Kokorin 45'; Koutny 82' (o.g.)

Krylia Sovetov stadium, Moscow
Referee: Domagoj Vučkov (Croatia)

26 May 2010
15:00 CET

Russia	3 – 1	Italy
Logua 5'; Kanunnikov 47'; Bashkirov 65'	Report	Borini 62'

Krylia Sovetov stadium, Moscow
Referee: Michael Lerjeus (Sweden)

26 May 2010
15:00 CET

Northern Ireland	1 – 3	Czech Republic
Gray 74'	Report	Krejčí 42'; Fantiš 57'; Kadeřábek 90'

Spartak Stadium, Shchyolkovo
Referee: Istvan Kovacs (Romania)

== Group 6 ==
Team	Pld	W	D	L	GF	GA	GD	Pts
Netherlands	3	2	1	0	5	0	+5	7
Slovakia	3	1	1	1	2	2	0	4
Germany	3	1	0	2	5	6	−1	3
Poland	3	1	0	2	2	6	−4	3

18 May 2010
17:00 CET

Netherlands	0 – 0	Slovakia
	Report

Sportpark "In de Bandert", Echt
Referee: Thoroddur Hjaltali (Iceland)

18 May 2010
19:00 CET

Germany	4 – 1	Poland
Tosun 15', 21', 55'; Alvarez 68'	Report	Kucharczyk 6'

Bakenbos, Tegelen
Referee: Stavros Tritsonis (Greece)

20 May 2010
16:00 CET

Slovakia	2 – 1	Germany
Banovič 45+1'; Mikuš 87'	Report	Sauter 8'

Sportpark "In de Bandert", Echt
Referee: Thoroddur Hjaltali (Iceland)

20 May 2010
18:30 CET

Netherlands	2 – 0	Poland
Castaignos 53', 64'	Report

Bakenbos, Tegelen
Referee: Lee Probert (England)

23 May 2010
18:00 CET

Germany	0 – 3	Netherlands
	Report	Cabral 7'; Van Haaren 37', 52'

De Koel, Venlo
Referee: Lee Probert (England)

23 May 2010
18:00 CET

Poland	1 – 0	Slovakia
Borysiuk 18'	Report

Bakenbos, Tegelen
Referee: Stavros Tritsonis (Greece)

== Group 7 ==
Team	Pld	W	D	L	GF	GA	GD	Pts
Austria	3	2	0	1	8	6	+2	6
Serbia	3	2	0	1	7	6	+1	6
Denmark	3	1	0	2	6	7	−1	3
Switzerland	3	1	0	2	5	7	−2	3

25 May 2010
16:00 CET

Serbia	3 – 2	Denmark
Aleksić 23'; Đuričić 28'; Šćepović 57'	Report	Jørgensen 15'; Kadrii 45'

Hall, Hall in Tirol
Referee: Bobby Madden (Scotland)

25 May 2010
19:00 CET

Switzerland	3 – 2	Austria
Sauthier 26'; Zuber 74'; Xhaka 90'	Report	Weimann 6'; Djuricin 90+4'

Sportzentrum Schwaz, Schwaz
Referee: Daniele Orsato (Italy)

27 May 2010
16:00 CET

Denmark	1 – 0	Switzerland
Jørgensen 34'	Report

Hall, Hall in Tirol
Referee: Sergey Tsinkevich (Belarus)

27 May 2010
19:00 CET

Serbia	0 – 2	Austria
	Report	Klem 70'; Knasmüllner 90'

Sportzentrum Schwaz, Schwaz
Referee: Bobby Madden (Scotland)

30 May 2010
17:00 CET

Switzerland	2 – 4	Serbia
Mehmedi 58'; Lang 67'	Report	Ljajić 19', 77'; Đuričić 29'; Aleksić 69'

Sportzentrum Schwaz, Schwaz
Referee: Daniele Orsato (Italy)

30 May 2010
17:00 CET

Austria	4 – 3	Denmark
Holzhauser 16'; Knasmüllner 24', 77'; Djuricin 73' (pen.)	Report	Larsen 11'; Jørgensen 34', 61'

Hall, Hall in Tirol
Referee: Sergey Tsinkevich (Belarus)

== Qualified nations ==
Country	Qualified as	Previous appearances in tournament^{1}
France	Hosts	**4** (2003, **2005**, 2007, 2009)
Croatia	Group 1 winner	**0** (debut)
Portugal	Group 2 winner	**3** (2003, 2006, 2007)
England	Group 3 winner	**4** (2002, 2003, 2005, 2008)
Spain	Group 4 winner	**6** (**2002**, **2004**, **2006**, **2007**, 2008, 2009)
Italy	Group 5 winner	**3** (2003, 2004, 2008)
Netherlands	Group 6 winner	**0** (debut)
Austria	Group 7 winner	**3** (2003, 2006, 2007)

^{1} Only counted appearances for under-19 era (bold indicates champion for that year, while italic indicates hosts)
