= 2018 FIFA World Cup qualification – UEFA Group C =

The 2018 FIFA World Cup qualification UEFA Group C was one of the nine UEFA groups for 2018 FIFA World Cup qualification. The group consisted of six teams: Germany, Czech Republic, Northern Ireland, Norway, Azerbaijan, and San Marino.

The draw was for the first round (group stage) which was not held as part of the 2018 FIFA World Cup Preliminary Draw on 25 July 2015, starting 18:00 MSK (UTC+3), at the Konstantinovsky Palace in Strelna, Saint Petersburg, Russia.

The group winners, Germany, who finished with a 100% record, qualified directly for the 2018 FIFA World Cup. The group runners-up, Northern Ireland, advanced to the play-offs as one of the best eight runners-up.

== Standings ==
2018 FIFA World Cup qualification tiebreakers
In league format, the ranking of teams in each group was based on the following criteria (regulations Articles 20.6 and 20.7):
1. Points (3 points for a win, 1 point for a draw, 0 points for a loss)
2. Overall goal difference
3. Overall goals scored
4. Points in matches between tied teams
5. Goal difference in matches between tied teams
6. Goals scored in matches between tied teams
7. Away goals scored in matches between tied teams (if the tie was only between two teams in home-and-away league format)
8. Fair play points
  - first yellow card: minus 1 point
  - indirect red card (second yellow card): minus 3 points
  - direct red card: minus 4 points
  - yellow card and direct red card: minus 5 points
9. Drawing of lots by the FIFA Organising Committee

| Pos | Team | Pld | W | D | L | GF | GA | GD | Pts | Qualification | Germany | | Czech Republic | Norway | Azerbaijan | San Marino |
|---|---|---|---|---|---|---|---|---|---|---|---|---|---|---|---|---|
| 1 | Germany | 10 | 10 | 0 | 0 | 43 | 4 | +39 | 30 | Qualification to 2018 FIFA World Cup | — | 2–0 | 3–0 | 6–0 | 5–1 | 7–0 |
| 2 | Northern Ireland | 10 | 6 | 1 | 3 | 17 | 6 | +11 | 19 | Advance to second round | 1–3 | — | 2–0 | 2–0 | 4–0 | 4–0 |
| 3 | Czech Republic | 10 | 4 | 3 | 3 | 17 | 10 | +7 | 15 | | 1–2 | 0–0 | — | 2–1 | 0–0 | 5–0 |
| 4 | Norway | 10 | 4 | 1 | 5 | 17 | 16 | +1 | 13 | | 0–3 | 1–0 | 1–1 | — | 2–0 | 4–1 |
| 5 | Azerbaijan | 10 | 3 | 1 | 6 | 10 | 19 | −9 | 10 | | 1–4 | 0–1 | 1–2 | 1–0 | — | 5–1 |
| 6 | San Marino | 10 | 0 | 0 | 10 | 2 | 51 | −49 | 0 | | 0–8 | 0–3 | 0–6 | 0–8 | 0–1 | — |

Source: FIFA
Rules for classification: Qualification tiebreakers

== Matches ==
The fixture list was confirmed by UEFA on 26 July 2015, the day following the draw. Times are CET/CEST, (Note: CET (UTC+1) for matches on 11 November 2016, and CEST (UTC+2) for all other matches.) as listed by UEFA (local times are in parentheses).

4 September 2016
18:00
(18:00 UTC+2)

| San Marino | 0–1 | Azerbaijan |
|---|---|---|
| | Report (FIFA); Report (UEFA) | Qurbanov 45' |

San Marino Stadium, Serravalle
Attendance: 886
Referee: Sébastien Delferière (Belgium)
4 September 2016
20:45
(20:45 UTC+2)

| Czech Republic | 0–0 | Northern Ireland |
|---|---|---|
| | Report (FIFA); Report (UEFA) |

Generali Arena, Prague
Attendance: 10,731
Referee: Anastasios Sidiropoulos (Greece)
4 September 2016
20:45
(20:45 UTC+2)

| Norway | 0–3 | Germany |
|---|---|---|
| | Report (FIFA); Report (UEFA) | Müller 16', 60'; Kimmich 45' |

Ullevaal Stadion, Oslo
Attendance: 26,793
Referee: Willie Collum (Scotland)

8 October 2016
18:00
(20:00 UTC+4)

| Azerbaijan | 1–0 | Norway |
|---|---|---|
| Medvedev 11' | Report (FIFA); Report (UEFA) |

Olympic Stadium, Baku
Attendance: 35,000
Referee: Liran Liany (Israel)
8 October 2016
20:45
(20:45 UTC+2)

| Germany | 3–0 | Czech Republic |
|---|---|---|
| Müller 13', 65'; Kroos 49' | Report (FIFA); Report (UEFA) |

Volksparkstadion, Hamburg
Attendance: 51,299
Referee: Ovidiu Hațegan (Romania)
8 October 2016
20:45
(19:45 UTC+1)

| Northern Ireland | 4–0 | San Marino |
|---|---|---|
| Davis 26' (pen.); K. Lafferty 79', 90+4'; Ward 85' | Report (FIFA); Report (UEFA) |

Windsor Park, Belfast
Attendance: 18,234
Referee: István Kovács (Romania)

11 October 2016
20:45
(20:45 UTC+2)

| Czech Republic | 0–0 | Azerbaijan |
|---|---|---|
| | Report (FIFA); Report (UEFA) |

Municipal Stadium, Ostrava
Attendance: 12,148
Referee: Matej Jug (Slovenia)
11 October 2016
20:45
(20:45 UTC+2)

| Germany | 2–0 | Northern Ireland |
|---|---|---|
| Draxler 13'; Khedira 17' | Report (FIFA); Report (UEFA) |

Niedersachsenstadion, Hanover
Attendance: 42,132
Referee: Paolo Tagliavento (Italy)
11 October 2016
20:45
(20:45 UTC+2)

| Norway | 4–1 | San Marino |
|---|---|---|
| D. Simoncini 12' (o.g.); Diomande 77'; Samuelsen 82'; King 83' | Report (FIFA); Report (UEFA) | Stefanelli 54' |

Ullevaal Stadion, Oslo
Attendance: 8,214
Referee: Benoît Bastien (France)

11 November 2016
20:45
(20:45 UTC+1)

| Czech Republic | 2–1 | Norway |
|---|---|---|
| Krmenčík 11'; Zmrhal 47' | Report (FIFA); Report (UEFA) | King 87' |

Eden Arena, Prague
Attendance: 16,411
Referee: Bas Nijhuis (Netherlands)
11 November 2016
20:45
(19:45 UTC±0)

| Northern Ireland | 4–0 | Azerbaijan |
|---|---|---|
| K. Lafferty 27'; McAuley 40'; C. McLaughlin 66'; Brunt 83' | Report (FIFA); Report (UEFA) |

Windsor Park, Belfast
Attendance: 18,404
Referee: Clément Turpin (France)
11 November 2016
20:45
(20:45 UTC+1)

| San Marino | 0–8 | Germany |
|---|---|---|
| | Report (FIFA); Report (UEFA) | Khedira 7'; Gnabry 9', 58', 76'; Hector 32', 65'; Stefanelli 82' (o.g.); Volland 85' |

San Marino Stadium, Serravalle
Attendance: 3,851
Referee: Artyom Kuchin (Kazakhstan)

26 March 2017
18:00
(20:00 UTC+4)

| Azerbaijan | 1–4 | Germany |
|---|---|---|
| Nazarov 31' | Report (FIFA); Report (UEFA) | Schürrle 19', 81'; Müller 36'; Gómez 45' |

Tofiq Bahramov Republican Stadium, Baku
Attendance: 30,000
Referee: Daniele Orsato (Italy)
26 March 2017
18:00
(18:00 UTC+2)

| San Marino | 0–6 | Czech Republic |
|---|---|---|
| | Report (FIFA); Report (UEFA) | Barák 17', 24'; Darida 19', 77' (pen.); Gebre Selassie 26'; Krmenčík 43' |

San Marino Stadium, Serravalle
Attendance: 1,023
Referee: Kristo Tohver (Estonia)
26 March 2017
20:45
(19:45 UTC+1)

| Northern Ireland | 2–0 | Norway |
|---|---|---|
| Ward 2'; Washington 33' | Report (FIFA); Report (UEFA) |

Windsor Park, Belfast
Attendance: 18,161
Referee: Hüseyin Göçek (Turkey)

10 June 2017
18:00
(20:00 UTC+4)

| Azerbaijan | 0–1 | Northern Ireland |
|---|---|---|
| | Report (FIFA); Report (UEFA) | Dallas 90+2' |

Tofiq Bahramov Republican Stadium, Baku
Attendance: 27,978
Referee: Xavier Estrada Fernández (Spain)
10 June 2017
20:45
(20:45 UTC+2)

| Germany | 7–0 | San Marino |
|---|---|---|
| Draxler 11'; Wagner 16', 29', 85'; Younes 38'; Mustafi 47'; Brandt 72' | Report (FIFA); Report (UEFA) |

Stadion Nürnberg, Nuremberg
Attendance: 32,467
Referee: Radu Petrescu (Romania)
10 June 2017
20:45
(20:45 UTC+2)

| Norway | 1–1 | Czech Republic |
|---|---|---|
| Søderlund 55' (pen.) | Report (FIFA); Report (UEFA) | Gebre Selassie 36' |

Ullevaal Stadion, Oslo
Attendance: 12,179
Referee: Andre Marriner (England)

1 September 2017
20:45
(20:45 UTC+2)

| Czech Republic | 1–2 | Germany |
|---|---|---|
| Darida 78' | Report (FIFA); Report (UEFA) | Werner 4'; Hummels 88' |

Eden Arena, Prague
Attendance: 18,093
Referee: Sergei Karasev (Russia)
1 September 2017
20:45
(20:45 UTC+2)

| Norway | 2–0 | Azerbaijan |
|---|---|---|
| King 31' (pen.); Sadygov 60' (o.g.) | Report (FIFA); Report (UEFA) |

Ullevaal Stadion, Oslo
Attendance: 8,599
Referee: Daniel Stefański (Poland)
1 September 2017
20:45
(20:45 UTC+2)

| San Marino | 0–3 | Northern Ireland |
|---|---|---|
| | Report (FIFA); Report (UEFA) | Magennis 70', 75'; Davis 78' (pen.) |

San Marino Stadium, Serravalle
Attendance: 2,544
Referee: Enea Jorgji (Albania)

4 September 2017
18:00
(20:00 UTC+4)

| Azerbaijan | 5–1 | San Marino |
|---|---|---|
| Ismayilov 20', 57'; Abdullayev 24'; Cevoli 71' (o.g.); Sadygov 81' | Report (FIFA); Report (UEFA) | Palazzi 74' |

Bakcell Arena, Baku
Attendance: 8,000
Referee: Nikola Dabanović (Montenegro)
4 September 2017
20:45
(20:45 UTC+2)

| Germany | 6–0 | Norway |
|---|---|---|
| Özil 10'; Draxler 17'; Werner 21', 40'; Goretzka 50'; Gómez 79' | Report (FIFA); Report (UEFA) |

Mercedes-Benz Arena, Stuttgart
Attendance: 53,814
Referee: Gediminas Mažeika (Lithuania)
4 September 2017
20:45
(19:45 UTC+1)

| Northern Ireland | 2–0 | Czech Republic |
|---|---|---|
| J. Evans 28'; Brunt 41' | Report (FIFA); Report (UEFA) |

Windsor Park, Belfast
Attendance: 18,167
Referee: Daniele Orsato (Italy)

5 October 2017
18:00
(20:00 UTC+4)

| Azerbaijan | 1–2 | Czech Republic |
|---|---|---|
| Ismayilov 55' (pen.) | Report (FIFA); Report (UEFA) | Kopic 35'; Barák 66' |

National Stadium, Baku
Attendance: 16,200
Referee: Benoît Millot (France)
5 October 2017
20:45
(19:45 UTC+1)

| Northern Ireland | 1–3 | Germany |
|---|---|---|
| Magennis 90+3' | Report (FIFA); Report (UEFA) | Rudy 2'; Wagner 21'; Kimmich 86' |

Windsor Park, Belfast
Attendance: 18,104
Referee: Danny Makkelie (Netherlands)
5 October 2017
20:45
(20:45 UTC+2)

| San Marino | 0–8 | Norway |
|---|---|---|
| | Report (FIFA); Report (UEFA) | Henriksen 8'; King 14' (pen.), 17'; Elyounoussi 39', 48', 68'; Selnæs 58'; Linnes 86' |

San Marino Stadium, Serravalle
Attendance: 1,922
Referee: Andrew Dallas (Scotland)

8 October 2017
20:45
(20:45 UTC+2)

| Czech Republic | 5–0 | San Marino |
|---|---|---|
| Krmenčík 8', 23'; Kopic 27'; Novák 71'; Kadlec 83' | Report (FIFA); Report (UEFA) |

Doosan Arena, Plzeň
Attendance: 5,625
Referee: Alex Troleis (Faroe Islands)
8 October 2017
20:45
(20:45 UTC+2)

| Germany | 5–1 | Azerbaijan |
|---|---|---|
| Goretzka 8', 66'; Wagner 54'; Rüdiger 64'; Can 81' | Report (FIFA); Report (UEFA) | Sheydayev 34' |

Fritz-Walter-Stadion, Kaiserslautern
Attendance: 34,613
Referee: Andris Treimanis (Latvia)
8 October 2017
20:45
(20:45 UTC+2)

| Norway | 1–0 | Northern Ireland |
|---|---|---|
| Brunt 71' (o.g.) | Report (FIFA); Report (UEFA) |

Ullevaal Stadion, Oslo
Attendance: 10,244
Referee: Serhiy Boyko (Ukraine)

== Goalscorers ==
There were 106 goals scored in 30 matches, for an average of 3.53 goals per match.

5 goals

- (Germany) Thomas Müller
- (Germany) Sandro Wagner
- (Norway) Joshua King

4 goals

- (Czech Republic) Michal Krmenčík

3 goals

- (Azerbaijan) Afran Ismayilov
- (Czech Republic) Antonín Barák
- (Czech Republic) Vladimír Darida
- (Germany) Julian Draxler
- (Germany) Serge Gnabry
- (Germany) Leon Goretzka
- (Germany) Timo Werner
- (Northern Ireland) Kyle Lafferty
- (Northern Ireland) Josh Magennis
- (Norway) Mohamed Elyounoussi

2 goals

- (Czech Republic) Theodor Gebre Selassie
- (Czech Republic) Jan Kopic
- (Germany) Mario Gómez
- (Germany) Jonas Hector
- (Germany) Sami Khedira
- (Germany) Joshua Kimmich
- (Germany) André Schürrle
- (Northern Ireland) Chris Brunt
- (Northern Ireland) Steven Davis
- (Northern Ireland) Jamie Ward

1 goal

- (Azerbaijan) Araz Abdullayev
- (Azerbaijan) Maksim Medvedev
- (Azerbaijan) Dimitrij Nazarov
- (Azerbaijan) Ruslan Qurbanov
- (Azerbaijan) Rashad Sadygov
- (Azerbaijan) Ramil Sheydayev
- (Czech Republic) Václav Kadlec
- (Czech Republic) Filip Novák
- (Czech Republic) Jaromír Zmrhal
- (Germany) Julian Brandt
- (Germany) Emre Can
- (Germany) Mats Hummels
- (Germany) Toni Kroos
- (Germany) Shkodran Mustafi
- (Germany) Mesut Özil
- (Germany) Antonio Rüdiger
- (Germany) Sebastian Rudy
- (Germany) Kevin Volland
- (Germany) Amin Younes
- (Northern Ireland) Stuart Dallas
- (Northern Ireland) Jonny Evans
- (Northern Ireland) Gareth McAuley
- (Northern Ireland) Conor McLaughlin
- (Northern Ireland) Conor Washington
- (Norway) Adama Diomande
- (Norway) Markus Henriksen
- (Norway) Martin Linnes
- (Norway) Martin Samuelsen
- (Norway) Ole Selnæs
- (Norway) Alexander Søderlund
- (San Marino) Mirko Palazzi
- (San Marino) Mattia Stefanelli

1 own goal

- (Azerbaijan) Rashad Sadygov (against Norway)
- (Northern Ireland) Chris Brunt (against Norway)
- (San Marino) Michele Cevoli (against Azerbaijan)
- (San Marino) Davide Simoncini (against Norway)
- (San Marino) Mattia Stefanelli (against Germany)

== Discipline ==
A player was automatically suspended for the next match for the following offences:

- Receiving a red card (red card suspensions could be extended for serious offences)
- Receiving two yellow cards in two different matches (yellow card suspensions were carried forward to the play-offs, but not the finals or any other future international matches)

The following suspensions were served during the qualifying matches:

| Player | Team | Offence(s) | Suspended for match(es) |
|---|---|---|---|
| Cristian Brolli | San Marino | (red card) vs Azerbaijan (4 September 2016) | vs Northern Ireland (8 October 2016) |
| Stefan Johansen | Norway | (yellow card) vs Germany (4 September 2016); (yellow card) vs Azerbaijan (8 October 2016) | vs San Marino (11 October 2016) |
| David Pavelka | Czech Republic | (yellow card) vs Northern Ireland (4 September 2016); (yellow card) vs Germany (8 October 2016) | vs Azerbaijan (11 October 2016) |
| Mirko Palazzi | San Marino | (yellow card) (yellow-red card) vs Northern Ireland (8 October 2016) | vs Norway (11 October 2016) |
| Matteo Vitaioli | San Marino | (yellow card) vs Azerbaijan (4 September 2016); (yellow card) vs Northern Ireland (8 October 2016) | vs Norway (11 October 2016) |
| Shane Ferguson | Northern Ireland | (yellow card) vs Germany (11 October 2016); (yellow card) vs Azerbaijan (11 November 2016) | vs Norway (26 March 2017) |
| Haitam Aleesami | Norway | (yellow card) vs Azerbaijan (8 October 2016); (yellow card) vs Czech Republic (11 November 2016) | vs Northern Ireland (26 March 2017) |
| Sami Khedira | Germany | (yellow card) vs Norway (4 September 2016); (yellow card) vs Azerbaijan (26 March 2017) | vs San Marino (10 June 2017) |
| Davide Simoncini | San Marino | (yellow card) vs Norway (11 October 2016); (yellow card) vs Czech Republic (26 March 2017) | vs Germany (10 June 2017) |
| Matteo Vitaioli | San Marino | (yellow card) vs Germany (11 November 2016); (yellow card) vs Czech Republic (26 March 2017) | vs Germany (10 June 2017) |
| Pier Filippo Mazza | San Marino | (yellow card) vs Czech Republic (26 March 2017); (yellow card) vs Germany (10 June 2017) | vs Northern Ireland (1 September 2017) |
| Badavi Guseynov | Azerbaijan | (yellow card) (yellow-red card) vs Norway (1 September 2017) | vs San Marino (4 September 2017) |
| Maksim Medvedev | Azerbaijan | (yellow card) vs Northern Ireland (10 June 2017); (yellow card) vs Norway (1 September 2017) | vs San Marino (4 September 2017) |
| Dimitrij Nazarov | Azerbaijan | (yellow card) vs Northern Ireland (11 November 2016); (yellow card) vs Norway (1 September 2017) | vs San Marino (4 September 2017) |
| Giovanni Bonini | San Marino | (yellow card) vs Germany (10 June 2017); (yellow card) vs Northern Ireland (1 September 2017) | vs Azerbaijan (4 September 2017) |
| Tomáš Kalas | Czech Republic | (yellow card) vs Germany (1 September 2017); (yellow card) vs Northern Ireland (4 September 2017) | vs Azerbaijan (5 October 2017) |
| Michele Cervellini | San Marino | (yellow card) vs Germany (10 June 2017); (yellow card) vs Norway (5 October 2017) | vs Czech Republic (8 October 2017) |
| Davide Simoncini | San Marino | (yellow card) vs Northern Ireland (1 September 2017); (yellow card) vs Norway (5 October 2017) | vs Czech Republic (8 October 2017) |
