= Belgium national football team results (2010–2019) =

- Win Draw Loss

In the 2010s, the Belgium national football team missed out on both the 2010 World Cup and Euro 2012, but improved greatly in the next years. They secured qualification for the 2014 World Cup with an impressive unbeaten record, and achieved sixth place at the finals: their second-best result ever (after reaching fourth in 1986) at the time. The improved results led to Belgium reaching the top position on the FIFA World Rankings for the first time, in November 2015. They had a setback losing to Wales in the quarter-finals at Euro 2016, but improved there play under a new coach, reaching their best result ever at the 2018 FIFA World Cup, ending third.

The overall balance over the course of the decade was positive, with 74 wins versus 16 losses and 21 draws.

== Results ==
Legend for encounters
W.C.	FIFA World Cup
EURO	UEFA European Football Championship
Q	Qualification rounds
GS	Group stage
R16	Round of 16 (eighth-finals)
QF	Quarter-final
SF	Semi-final
3rd	Third place

111 official matches played (as of 19 November 2019):

=== 2010 ===
3 March 2010 Friendly	Belgium	0–1	Croatia	Brussels, Belgium
20:45 UTC+1		Report	Kranjčar 63'	Stadium: King Baudouin Stadium; Attendance: 20,000; Referee: Gianluca Rocchi (Italy)

19 May 2010 Friendly	Belgium	2–1	Bulgaria	Brussels, Belgium
19:45 UTC+1	Lepoint 89'; Kompany 90+1'	Report	Popov 31'	Stadium: King Baudouin Stadium; Attendance: 25,000; Referee: Michael Weiner (Germany)

11 August 2010 Friendly	Finland	1–0	Belgium	Turku, Finland
20:00 UTC+3	Porokara 13'	Report		Stadium: Veritas Stadion; Attendance: 7,451; Referee: Alain Hamer (Luxembourg)

3 September 2010 EURO 2012 Q	Belgium	0–1	Germany	Brussels, Belgium
20:45 UTC+2		Report	Klose 51'	Stadium: King Baudouin Stadium; Attendance: 41,126; Referee: Terje Hauge (Norway)

7 September 2010 EURO 2012 Q	Turkey	3–2	Belgium	Istanbul, Turkey
21:00 UTC+3	Altıntop 48'; Şentürk 66'; Turan 78'	Report	Van Buyten 28', 69'; Kompany (yellow card) 40' (yellow-red card) 64'	Stadium: Şükrü Saracoğlu Stadium; Attendance: 43,538; Referee: Damir Skomina (Slovenia)

8 October 2010 EURO 2012 Q	Kazakhstan	0–2	Belgium	Astana, Kazakhstan
22:00 UTC+6	Kislitsyn (yellow card) 51' (yellow-red card) 68'	Report	Ogunjimi 52', 70'	Stadium: Astana Arena; Attendance: 8,500; Referee: Marcin Borski (Poland)

12 October 2010 EURO 2012 Q	Belgium	4–4	Austria	Brussels, Belgium
20:45 UTC+2	Vossen 11'; Fellaini 47'; Ogunjimi 87'; Lombaerts 90'	Report	Schiemer 14', 62'; Arnautović 29'; Scharner (red card) 68'; Harnik 90+3'	Stadium: King Baudouin Stadium; Attendance: 25,000; Referee: Mike Dean (England)

17 November 2010 Friendly	Russia	0–2	Belgium	Voronezh, Russia
18:00 UTC+2		Report	Lukaku 2', 72'	Stadium: Trade Unions Central Stadium; Attendance: 34,000; Referee: Hannes Kaasik (Estonia)

=== 2011 ===
9 February 2011 Friendly	Belgium	1–1	Finland	Ghent, Belgium
19:00 UTC+1	Witsel 61'	Report	Porokara 90+3'	Stadium: Jules Ottenstadion; Attendance: 12,800; Referee: Cyril Zimmermann (Switzerland)

29 March 2011 EURO 2012 Q	Austria	0–2	Belgium	Vienna, Austria
20:30 UTC+1		Report	Witsel 6', 50'	Stadium: Ernst Happel Stadion; Attendance: 45,000; Referee: Vladislav Bezborodov (Russia)

29 March 2011 EURO 2012 Q	Belgium	4–1	Azerbaijan	Brussels, Belgium
20:45 UTC+2	Vertonghen 12'; Simons 32' (pen.); Chadli 45+1'; Vossen 74'	Report	Abışov 16'	Stadium: King Baudouin Stadium; Attendance: 34,985; Referee: Daniel Stålhammar (Sweden)

3 June 2011 EURO 2012 Q	Belgium	1–1	Turkey	Brussels, Belgium
20:45 UTC+2	Ogunjimi 4'	Report	Yılmaz 22'	Stadium: King Baudouin Stadium; Attendance: 44,185; Referee: Nicola Rizzoli (Italy)

10 August 2011 Friendly	Slovenia	0–0	Belgium	Ljubljana, Slovenia
20:45 UTC+2		Report		Stadium: Športni Park Stožice; Attendance: 12,230; Referee: Marijo Strahonja (Croatia)

2 September 2011 EURO 2012 Q	Azerbaijan	1–1	Belgium	Baku, Azerbaijan
21:00 UTC+5	Aliyev 86'	Report	Simons 55' (pen.)	Stadium: Tofiq Bəhramov adına Respublika Stadionu; Attendance: 9,300; Referee: Lee Probert (England)

6 September 2011 Friendly	Belgium	1–0	United States	Brussels, Belgium
21:45 UTC+2	Lombaerts 56'	Report		Stadium: King Baudouin Stadium; Attendance: 21,946; Referee: William Collum (Scotland)

7 October 2011 EURO 2012 Q	Belgium	4–1	Kazakhstan	Brussels, Belgium
20:45 UTC+2	Simons 40' (pen.); Hazard 43'; Kompany 49'; Ogunjimi 84'	Report	Kurgulin (red card) 59'; Nurdauletov 86' (pen.)	Stadium: King Baudouin Stadium; Attendance: 29,758; Referee: Milorad Mažić (Serbia)

11 October 2011 EURO 2012 Q	Germany	3–1	Belgium	Düsseldorf, Germany
19:00 UTC+2	Özil 30'; Schürrle 33'; Gómez 48'	Report	Fellaini 86'	Stadium: Esprit Arena; Attendance: 48,483; Referee: Svein Oddvar Moen (Norway)

11 November 2011 Friendly	Belgium	2–1	Romania	Liège, Belgium
20:45 UTC+1	Van Buyten 11'; Cociș 43' (o.g.)	Report	Niculae 67'	Stadium: Stade Maurice Dufrasne; Attendance: 15,000; Referee: Saïd Ennjimi (France)

15 November 2011 Friendly	France	0–0	Belgium	Paris, France
16:00 UTC+1		Report		Stadium: Stade de France; Attendance: 55,000; Referee: César Muñiz Fernández (Spain)

=== 2012 ===
29 February 2012 Friendly	Greece	1–1	Belgium	Iraklion, Greece
20:30 UTC+1	Salpingidis 8'	Report	Chadli 31'; Lombaerts (yellow card) 22' (yellow-red card) 61'	Stadium: Pankritio; Attendance: 15,000; Referee: Daniel Stålhammar (Sweden)

25 May 2012 Friendly	Belgium	2–2	Montenegro	Brussels, Belgium
20:45 UTC+2	Mirallas 25'; E. Hazard 34' (pen.)	Report	Vučinić 5'; Drinčić 76'	Stadium: King Baudouin Stadium; Attendance: 20,000; Referee: Clément Turpin (France)

2 June 2012 Friendly	England	1–0	Belgium	London, England
18:15 UTC+2	Welbeck 37'	Report		Stadium: Wembley; Attendance: 85,091; Referee: Peter Rasmussen (Denmark)

15 August 2012 Friendly	Belgium	4–2	Netherlands	Brussels, Belgium
20:45 UTC+2	Benteke 20'; Mertens 75'; Lukaku 77'; Vertonghen 80'	Report	Narsingh 54'; Huntelaar 55'	Stadium: King Baudouin Stadium; Attendance: 46,000; Referee: Martin Atkinson (England)

7 September 2012 2014 W.C. Q	Wales	0–2	Belgium	Cardiff, Wales
20:45 UTC+2	Collins (red card) 26'	Report	Kompany 42'; Vertonghen 83'	Stadium: Cardiff City Stadium; Attendance: 20,156; Referee: Stefan Johannesson (Sweden)

11 September 2012 2014 W.C. Q	Belgium	1–1	Croatia	Brussels, Belgium
20:45 UTC+2	Gillet 45+1'	Report	Perišić 6'	Stadium: King Baudouin Stadium; Attendance: 39,987; Referee: Alberto Undiano Mallenco (Spain)

12 October 2012 2014 W.C. Q	Serbia	0–3	Belgium	Belgrade, Serbia
20:30 UTC+2		Report	Benteke 34'; De Bruyne 68'; Mirallas 90+1'	Stadium: Stadion Crvena Zvezda; Attendance: 21,650; Referee: Pavel Královec (Czech Republic)

16 October 2012 2014 W.C. Q	Belgium	2–0	Scotland	Brussels, Belgium
20:45 UTC+2	Benteke 68'; Kompany 71'	Report		Stadium: King Baudouin Stadium; Attendance: 44,132; Referee: Tom Harald Hagen (Norway)

=== 2013 ===
6 February 2013 Friendly	Belgium	2–1	Slovakia	Bruges, Belgium
20:45 UTC+1	E. Hazard 10'; Mertens 90'	Report	Lásik 87'	Stadium: Jan Breydel Stadium; Attendance: 20,000; Referee: Alon Yefet (Israel)

22 March 2013 2014 W.C. Q	Macedonia	0–2	Belgium	Skopje, Macedonia
20:45 UTC+1		Report	De Bruyne 26'; E. Hazard 62' (pen.)	Stadium: Philip II Arena; Attendance: 15,947; Referee: Deniz Aytekin (Germany)

26 March 2013 2014 W.C. Q	Belgium	1–0	Macedonia	Brussels, Belgium
20:45 UTC+1	E. Hazard 62'	Report		Stadium: King Baudouin Stadium; Attendance: 44,230; Referee: Olegário Benquerença (Portugal)

29 May 2013 Friendly	United States	2–4	Belgium	Cleveland, United States
2:00 UTC+2	Cameron 22'; Dempsey 80' (pen.)	Report	Mirallas 6'; Benteke 56', 71'; Fellaini 64'	Stadium: FirstEnergy Stadium; Attendance: 30,000; Referee: Jeffrey Solis Calderon (Costa Rica)

7 June 2013 2014 W.C. Q	Belgium	2–1	Serbia	Brussels, Belgium
20:45 UTC+2	De Bruyne 13'; Fellaini 60'	Report	Kolarov 87'	Stadium: King Baudouin Stadium; Attendance: 45,844; Referee: Stéphane Lannoy (France)

14 August 2013 Friendly	Belgium	0–0	France	Brussels, Belgium
21:00 UTC+2		Report		Stadium: King Baudouin Stadium; Attendance: 45,000; Referee: Craig Thomson (Scotland)

6 September 2013 2014 W.C. Q	Scotland	0–2	Belgium	Glasgow, Scotland
21:00 UTC+2		Report	Defour 38'; Mirallas 88'	Stadium: Hampden Park; Attendance: 36,000; Referee: Paolo Tagliavento (Italy)

11 October 2013 2014 W.C. Q	Croatia	1–2	Belgium	Zagreb, Croatia
18:00 UTC+2	Kranjčar 83'	Report	Lukaku 15', 38'	Stadium: Maksimir Stadium; Attendance: 13,000; Referee: Howard Webb (England)

15 October 2013 2014 W.C. Q	Belgium	1–1	Wales	Brussels, Belgium
21:00 UTC+2	De Bruyne 64'	Report	Ramsey 88'	Stadium: King Baudouin Stadium; Attendance: 45,401; Referee: Sergey Karasev (Russia)

14 November 2013 Friendly	Belgium	0–2	Colombia	Brussels, Belgium
21:00 UTC+1		Report	Falcao 51'; Ibarbo 66'	Stadium: King Baudouin Stadium; Attendance: 45,000; Referee: Mark Clattenburg (England)

19 November 2013 Friendly	Belgium	2–3	Japan	Brussels, Belgium
21:00 UTC+1	Mirallas 15'; Alderweireld 79'	Report	Kakitani 37'; Honda 53'; Okazaki 63'	Stadium: King Baudouin Stadium; Attendance: 43,000; Referee: Fırat Aydınus (Turkey)

=== 2014 ===
5 March 2014 Friendly	Belgium	2–2	Ivory Coast	Brussels, Belgium
20:45 UTC+1	Fellaini 17'; Nainggolan 51'	Report	Drogba 74'; Gradel 90+2'	Stadium: King Baudouin Stadium; Attendance: 45,000; Referee: Damir Skomina (Slovenia)

1 June 2014 Friendly	Sweden	0–2	Belgium	Stockholm, Sweden
20:30 UTC+2		Report	Lukaku 34'; Hazard 78'	Stadium: Friends Arena; Attendance: 24,732; Referee: Mark Clattenburg (England)

7 June 2014 Friendly	Belgium	1–0	Tunisia	Brussels, Belgium
20:45 UTC+2	Mertens 89'	Report	Jemâa (yellow card) 45' (yellow-red card) 63'	Stadium: King Baudouin Stadium; Attendance: 41,349; Referee: Viktor Kassai (Hungary)

17 June 2014 2014 W.C. GS	Belgium	2–1	Algeria	Belo Horizonte, Brazil
13:00 UTC−3; 18:00 UTC+2	Fellaini 70'; Mertens 80'	Report	Feghouli 24' (pen.)	Stadium: Estádio Mineirão; Attendance: 56,800; Referee: Marco Rodríguez (Mexico)

22 June 2014 2014 W.C. GS	Belgium	1–0	Russia	Rio de Janeiro, Brazil
13:00 UTC−3; 18:00 UTC+2	Origi 88'	Report		Stadium: Estádio do Maracanã; Attendance: 73,819; Referee: Felix Brych (Germany)

26 June 2014 2014 W.C. GS	South Korea	0–1	Belgium	São Paulo, Brazil
17:00 UTC−3; 22:00 UTC+2		Report	Defour (red card) 44'; Vertonghen 78'	Stadium: Arena de São Paulo; Attendance: 61,397; Referee: Ben Williams (Australia)

1 July 2014 2014 W.C. R16	Belgium	2–1 (a.e.t.)	United States	Salvador, Brazil
17:00 UTC−3; 22:00 UTC+2	De Bruyne 93'; Lukaku 105'	Report	Green 107'	Stadium: Arena Fonte Nova; Attendance: 51,227; Referee: Djamel Haimoudi (Algeria)

5 July 2014 2014 W.C. QF	Argentina	1–0	Belgium	Brasília, Brazil
13:00 UTC−3; 18:00 UTC+2	Higuaín 8'	Report		Stadium: Estádio Nacional Mané Garrincha; Attendance: 68,551; Referee: Nicola Rizzoli (Italy)

4 September 2014 Friendly	Belgium	2–0	Australia	Liège, Belgium
20:45 UTC+2	Mertens 18'; Witsel 78'	Report		Stadium: Stade Maurice Dufrasne; Attendance: 16,850; Referee: Michael Oliver (England)

10 October 2014 EURO 2016 Q	Belgium	6–0	Andorra	Brussels, Belgium
20:45 UTC+2	De Bruyne 31' (pen.), 34'; Chadli 37'; Origi 59'; Mertens 65', 68'	Report		Stadium: King Baudouin Stadium; Attendance: 45,409; Referee: Serhiy Boiko (Ukraine)

13 October 2014 EURO 2016 Q	Bosnia and Herzegovina	1–1	Belgium	Zenica, Bosnia and Herzegovina
20:45	Džeko 28'	Report	Nainggolan 51'	Stadium: Bilino Polje; Attendance: 12,070; Referee: Luca Banti (Italy)

12 November 2014 Friendly	Belgium	3–1	Iceland	Brussels, Belgium
20:45	Lombaerts 12'; Origi 62'; Lukaku 73'	Report	Finnbogason 13'	Stadium: King Baudouin Stadium; Attendance: 27,500; Referee: Antony Gautier (France)

16 November 2014 EURO 2016 Q	Belgium	0–0	Wales	Brussels, Belgium
18:00		Report		Stadium: King Baudouin Stadium; Attendance: 41,535; Referee: Pavel Královec (Czech Republic)

=== 2015 ===
28 March 2015 EURO 2016 Q	Belgium	5–0	Cyprus	Brussels, Belgium
20:45	Fellaini 21', 66'; Benteke 35'; Hazard 67'; Batshuayi 80'	Report		Stadium: King Baudouin Stadium; Attendance: 45,000; Referee: Ovidiu Hațegan (Romania)

31 March 2015 (Note: The Israel v Belgium match was originally to be played on 9 September 2014, 20:45 (21:45 UTC+3), but was postponed due to the 2014 Israel–Gaza conflict.) EURO 2016 Q	Israel	0–1	Belgium	Jerusalem, Israel
20:45		Report	Fellaini 9'; Kompany (yellow card) 11' (yellow-red card) 64'	Stadium: Teddy Stadium; Attendance: 33,000; Referee: Mark Clattenburg (England)

7 June 2015 Friendly	France	3–4	Belgium	Saint-Denis, France
21:00	Valbuena 53' (pen.); Fekir 89'; Payet 90+1'	Report	Fellaini 17', 42'; Nainggolan 50'; E. Hazard 54' (pen.)	Stadium: Stade de France; Attendance: 70,000; Referee: Marijo Strahonja (Croatia)

12 June 2015 EURO 2016 Q	Wales	1–0	Belgium	Cardiff, Wales
20:45	Bale 25'	Report		Stadium: Cardiff City Stadium; Attendance: 33,280; Referee: Felix Brych (Germany)

3 September 2015 EURO 2016 Q	Belgium	3–1	Bosnia and Herzegovina	Brussels, Belgium
20:45	Fellaini 23'; De Bruyne 44'; Hazard 78' (pen.)	Report	Džeko 15'	Stadium: King Baudouin Stadium; Attendance: 42,975; Referee: Jorge Sousa (Portugal)

6 September 2015 EURO 2016 Q	Cyprus	0–1	Belgium	Nicosia, Cyprus
20:45 (21:45 UTC+3)		Report	Hazard 86'	Stadium: GSP Stadium; Attendance: 11,866; Referee: Vladislav Bezborodov (Russia)

10 October 2015 EURO 2016 Q	Andorra	1–4	Belgium	Andorra la Vella, Andorra
20:45	Lima 51' (pen.)	Report	Nainggolan 19'; De Bruyne 42'; Hazard 56' (pen.); Depoitre 64'	Stadium: Estadi Comunal; Attendance: 3,450; Referee: Paweł Gil (Poland)

13 October 2015 EURO 2016 Q	Belgium	3–1	Israel	Brussels, Belgium
20:45	Mertens 64'; De Bruyne 78'; Hazard 84'	Report	Hemed 88'	Stadium: King Baudouin Stadium; Attendance: 45,000; Referee: Anastasios Sidiropoulos (Greece)

13 November 2015 Friendly	Belgium	3–1	Italy	Brussels, Belgium
20:45 (20:45 UTC+1)	Vertonghen 13'; De Bruyne 74'; Batshuayi 82'	Report	Candreva 3'	Stadium: King Baudouin Stadium; Attendance: 40,000; Referee: Szymon Marciniak (Poland)

=== 2016 ===
29 March 2016 Friendly	Portugal	2–1	Belgium	Leiria, Portugal
20:45 (UTC+2)	Nani 20'; Ronaldo 40'	Report	R. Lukaku 62'	Stadium: Estádio Dr. Magalhães Pessoa; Attendance: 21,157; Referee: Stephan Klossner (Switzerland)

28 May 2016 Friendly	Switzerland	1–2	Belgium	Genève, Switzerland
16:15 (UTC+2)	Džemaili 31'; Seferovic (red card) 81'	Report	R. Lukaku 34'; De Bruyne 83'	Stadium: Stade de Genève; Attendance: 20,000; Referee: Paolo Mazzoleni (Italy)

1 June 2016 Friendly	Belgium	1–1	Finland	Brussels, Belgium
20:45 (UTC+2)	R. Lukaku 89'	Report	Hämäläinen 53'	Stadium: King Baudouin Stadium; Attendance: 30,000; Referee: Hugo Miguel (Portugal)

5 June 2016 Friendly	Belgium	3–2	Norway	Brussels, Belgium
18:00 (UTC+2)	R. Lukaku 3'; Hazard 70'; Ciman 74'	Report	King 21'; Veton Berisha 48'	Stadium: King Baudouin Stadium; Attendance: 42,196; Referee: Tobias Stieler (German)

13 June 2016 EURO 2016 GS	Belgium	0–2	Italy	Lyon, France
21:00 (UTC+2)		Report	Giaccherini 32'; Pellè 90+3'	Stadium: Parc Olympique Lyonnais; Attendance: 55,408; Referee: Mark Clattenburg (England)

18 June 2016 EURO 2016 GS	Belgium	3–0	Republic of Ireland	Bordeaux, France
15:00 (UTC+2)	R. Lukaku 48', 70'; Witsel 61'	Report		Stadium: Nouveau Stade de Bordeaux; Attendance: 39,493; Referee: Cüneyt Çakır (Turkey)

22 June 2016 EURO 2016 GS	Sweden	0–1	Belgium	Nice, France
21:00 (UTC+2)		Report	Nainggolan 84'	Stadium: Allianz Riviera; Attendance: 34,011; Referee: Felix Brych (Germany)

26 June 2016 EURO 2016 R16	Hungary	0–4	Belgium	Toulouse, France
21:00 (UTC+2)		Report	Alderweireld 10'; Batshuayi 78'; E. Hazard 79'; Carrasco 90'	Stadium: Stadium Municipal; Attendance: 28,921; Referee: Milorad Mažić (Serbia)

1 July 2016 EURO 2016 QF	Wales	3–1	Belgium	Villeneuve-d'Ascq, France
21:00 (UTC+2)	A. Williams 31'; Robson-Kanu 55'; Vokes 86'	Report	Nainggolan 13'	Stadium: Stade Pierre-Mauroy; Attendance: 45,936; Referee: Damir Skomina (Slovenia)

1 September 2016 Friendly	Belgium	0–2	Spain	Brussels, Belgium
20:45 (20:45 UTC+2)		Report	Silva 34', 62' (pen.)	Stadium: King Baudouin Stadium; Attendance: 28,000; Referee: Benoît Bastien (France)

6 September 2016 2018 W.C. Q	Cyprus	0–3	Belgium	Nicosia, Cyprus
20:45 (21:45 UTC+3)		Report	R. Lukaku 13', 61'; Carrasco 81'	Stadium: GSP Stadium; Attendance: 12,029; Referee: Felix Zwayer (Germany)

7 October 2016 2018 W.C. Q	Belgium	4–0	Bosnia and Herzegovina	Brussels, Belgium
20:45 (20:45 UTC+2)	Spahić 26' (o.g.); E. Hazard 29'; Alderweireld 60'; R. Lukaku 79'	Report		Stadium: King Baudouin Stadium; Attendance: 42,653; Referee: Martin Atkinson (England)

10 October 2016 2018 W.C. Q	Gibraltar	0–6	Belgium	Faro/Loulé, Portugal
20:45 (21:45 UTC+3)		Report	Benteke 1', 43', 56'; Witsel 19'; Mertens 51'; E. Hazard 79'	Stadium: Estádio Algarve; Attendance: 1,959; Referee: Paweł Raczkowski (Poland)

9 November 2016 Friendly	Netherlands	1–1	Belgium	Amsterdam, Netherlands
20:45 CEST (UTC+02:00)	Klaassen 38' (pen.)	Report	Carrasco 82'	Stadium: Amsterdam Arena; Attendance: 37,500; Referee: Szymon Marciniak (Poland)

13 November 2016 2018 W.C. Q	Belgium	8–1	Estonia	Brussels, Belgium
20:45 (20:45 UTC+1)	Meunier 8'; Mertens 16', 68'; E. Hazard 25'; Carrasco 62'; Klavan 64' (o.g.); R. Lukaku 83', 88'	Report	Anier 29'	Stadium: King Baudouin Stadium; Attendance: 37,128; Referee: Alexandru Tudor (Romania)

=== 2017 ===
25 March 2017 2018 W.C. Q	Belgium	1–1	Greece	Brussels, Belgium
20:45 (UTC+1)	R. Lukaku 89'	Report	Mitroglou 46'	Stadium: King Baudouin Stadium; Attendance: 42,281; Referee: Felix Brych (Germany)

28 March 2017 Friendly	Russia	3–3	Belgium	Sochi, Russia
18:00 (19:00 UTC+2)	Vasin 3'; Miranchuk 74'; Bukharov 90+2'	Report	Mirallas 17' (pen.); Benteke 42', 45'	Stadium: Fisht Stadium; Attendance: 39,000; Referee: Szymon Marciniak (Poland)

9 June 2017 2018 W.C. Q	Estonia	0–2	Belgium	Tallinn, Estonia
20:45 (21:45 UTC+3)		Report (UEFA)	Mertens 31'; Chadli 86'	Stadium: A. Le Coq Arena; Attendance: 10,176; Referee: John Beaton (Scotland)

31 August 2017 2018 W.C. Q	Belgium	9–0	Gibraltar	Liège, Belgium
20:45 (20:45 UTC+2)	Mertens 16'; Meunier 18', 61', 67'; R. Lukaku 21', 38', 82' (pen.); Witsel 27'; E. Hazard 45'	Report (FIFA); Report (UEFA)		Stadium: Stade Maurice Dufrasne; Attendance: 24,050; Referee: Neil Doyle (Republic of Ireland)

3 September 2017 2018 W.C. Q	Greece	1–2	Belgium	Piraeus, Greece
20:45 (21:45 UTC+3)	Zeca 73'	Report (FIFA); Report (UEFA)	Vertonghen 70'; R. Lukaku 74'	Stadium: Karaiskakis Stadium; Attendance: 29,465; Referee: Szymon Marciniak (Poland)

7 October 2017 2018 W.C. Q	Bosnia and Herzegovina	3–4	Belgium	Sarajevo, Bosnia and Herzegovina
18:00 (18:00 UTC+2)	Medunjanin 30'; Višća 39'; Đumić 82'	Report (FIFA); Report (UEFA)	Meunier 4'; Batshuayi 59'; Vertonghen 68'; Carrasco 84'	Stadium: Stadion Grbavica (Note: Bosnia and Herzegovina were sanctioned by FIFA to play one home match (against Belgium on 7 October 2017) away from Bilino Polje Stadium, Zenica due to a series of incidents during their home match against Greece.); Attendance: 9,657; Referee: Willie Collum (Scotland)

10 October 2017 2018 W.C. Q	Belgium	4–0	Cyprus	Brussels, Belgium
20:45 (20:45 UTC+2)	E. Hazard 12', 63' (pen.); T. Hazard 52'; R. Lukaku 78'	Report (FIFA); Report (UEFA)		Stadium: King Baudouin Stadium; Attendance: 37,765; Referee: Luca Banti (Italy)

10 November 2017 Friendly	Belgium	3–3	Mexico	Brussels, Belgium
20:45 UTC+2	E. Hazard 18'; R. Lukaku 55', 70'	Report	Guardado 38'; Lozano 57', 60'	Stadium: King Baudouin Stadium; Attendance: 40,956; Referee: Paolo Mazzoleni (Italy)

14 November 2017 Friendly	Belgium	1–0	Japan	Bruges, Belgium
20:45 UTC+1	R. Lukaku 72'	Report		Stadium: Jan Breydel Stadium; Attendance: 25,500; Referee: Danny Makkelie (Netherlands)

=== 2018 ===
27 March 2018 Friendly	Belgium	4–0	Saudi Arabia	Brussels, Belgium
20:45 UTC+2	R. Lukaku 13', 39'; Batshuayi 77'; De Bruyne 78'	Report		Stadium: King Baudouin Stadium; Attendance: 22,578; Referee: Matej Jug (Slovenia)

2 June 2018 Friendly	Belgium	0–0	Portugal	Brussels, Belgium
20:45 UTC+2		Report		Stadium: King Baudouin Stadium; Attendance: 35,000; Referee: Viktor Kassai (Hungary)

6 June 2018 Friendly	Belgium	3–0	Egypt	Brussels, Belgium
20:45 UTC+2	R. Lukaku 27'; E. Hazard 38'; Fellaini 90+2'	Report		Stadium: King Baudouin Stadium; Attendance: 27,274; Referee: Tasos Sidiropoulos (Greece)

11 June 2018 Friendly	Belgium	4–1	Costa Rica	Brussels, Belgium
20:45 UTC+2	Mertens 31'; R. Lukaku 42', 50'; Batshuayi 64'	Report	Ruiz 24'	Stadium: King Baudouin Stadium; Attendance: 28,000; Referee: Ovidiu Hategan (Romania)

18 June 2018 2018 W.C. GS	Belgium	3–0	Panama	Sochi, Russia
17:00 UTC+2	Mertens 47'; R. Lukaku 69', 75'	Report		Stadium: Fisht Olympic Stadium; Attendance: 43,257; Referee: Janny Sikazwe (Zambia)

23 June 2018 2018 W.C. GS	Belgium	5–2	Tunisia	Moscow, Russia
14:00 UTC+2	E. Hazard 6' (pen.), 51'; R. Lukaku 16', 45+3'; Batshuayi 90'	Report	Bronn 18'; Khazri 90+3'	Stadium: Spartak Stadium; Attendance: 44,190; Referee: Jair Marrufo (United States)

28 June 2018 2018 W.C. GS	England	0–1	Belgium	Kaliningrad, Russia
20:00 UTC+2		Report	Januzaj 51'	Stadium: Kaliningrad Stadium; Attendance: 33,973; Referee: Damir Skomina (Slovenia)

2 July 2018 2018 W.C. R16	Belgium	3–2	Japan	Rostov-on-Don, Russia
20:00 UTC+2	Vertonghen 69'; Fellaini 74'; Chadli 90+4'	Report	Haraguchi 48'; Inui 52'	Stadium: Rostov Arena; Attendance: 41,466; Referee: Malang Diedhiou (Senegal)

6 July 2018 2018 W.C. QF	Brazil	1–2	Belgium	Kazan, Russia
20:00 UTC+2	Renato Augusto 76'	Report	Fernandinho 13' (o.g.); De Bruyne 31'	Stadium: Kazan Arena; Attendance: 42,873; Referee: Milorad Mažić (Serbia)

10 July 2018 2018 W.C. SF	France	1–0	Belgium	Saint Petersburg, Russia
20:00 UTC+2	Umtiti 51'	Report		Stadium: Krestovsky Stadium; Attendance: 64,286; Referee: Andrés Cunha (Uruguay)

14 July 2018 2018 W.C. 3rd	Belgium	2–0	England	Saint Petersburg, Russia
16:00 UTC+2	Meunier 4'; E. Hazard 82'	Report		Stadium: Krestovsky Stadium; Attendance: 64,406; Referee: Alireza Faghani (Iran)

7 September 2018 Friendly	Scotland	0–4	Belgium	Glasgow, Scotland
20:45 (19:45 UTC+1)		Report	R. Lukaku 28'; E. Hazard 46'; Batshuayi 52', 60'	Stadium: Hampden Park; Attendance: 20,196; Referee: Luca Banti (Italy)

11 September 2018 2018–19 Nations League A	Iceland	0–3	Belgium	Reykjavík, Iceland
20:45 (18:45 UTC±0)		Report	E. Hazard 29' (pen.); R. Lukaku 31', 81'	Stadium: Laugardalsvöllur; Attendance: 9,710; Referee: Sergei Karasev (Russia)

12 October 2018 2018–19 Nations League A	Belgium	2–1	Switzerland	Brussels, Belgium
20:45 (20:45 UTC+2)	R. Lukaku 58', 84'	Report	Gavranović 76'	Stadium: King Baudouin Stadium; Attendance: 39,049; Referee: Antonio Mateu Lahoz (Spain)

16 October 2018 Friendly	Belgium	1–1	Netherlands	Brussels, Belgium
20:45 (20:45 UTC+2)	Mertens 5'	Report	Groeneveld 27'	Stadium: King Baudouin Stadium; Attendance: 34,747; Referee: Artur Soares Dias (Portugal)

15 November 2018 2018–19 Nations League A	Belgium	2–0	Iceland	Brussels, Belgium
20:45 (20:45 UTC+1)	Batshuayi 65', 81'	Report		Stadium: King Baudouin Stadium; Attendance: 28,891; Referee: Orel Grinfeld (Israel)

18 November 2018 2018–19 Nations League A	Switzerland	5–2	Belgium	Lucerne, Switzerland
20:45 (20:45 UTC+1)	Rodríguez 26' (pen.); Seferovic 31', 44', 84'; Elvedi 62'	Report	T. Hazard 2', 17'	Stadium: Swissporarena; Attendance: 15,000; Referee: Daniele Orsato (Italy)

=== 2019 ===
21 March 2019 EURO 2020 Q	Belgium	3–1	Russia	Brussels, Belgium
20:45 (20:45 UTC+1)	Tielemans 14'; E. Hazard 45' (pen.), 88'	Report	Cheryshev 16'	Stadium: King Baudouin Stadium; Attendance: 34,245; Referee: Ovidiu Haţegan (Romania)

24 March 2019 EURO 2020 Q	Cyprus	0–2	Belgium	Nicosia, Cyprus
20:45 (21:45 UTC+2)		Report	E. Hazard 10'; Batshuayi 18'	Stadium: GSP Stadium; Attendance: 8,728; Referee: François Letexier (France)

8 June 2019 EURO 2020 Q	Belgium	3–0	Kazakhstan	Brussels, Belgium
20:45 (20:45 UTC+2)	Mertens 11'; Castagne 14'; R. Lukaku 50'	Report		Stadium: King Baudouin Stadium; Attendance: 37,155; Referee: Irfan Peljto (Bosnia and Herzegovina)

11 June 2019 EURO 2020 Q	Belgium	3–0	Scotland	Brussels, Belgium
20:45 (20:45 UTC+2)	R. Lukaku 45+1', 57'; De Bruyne 90+2'	Report		Stadium: King Baudouin Stadium; Attendance: 32,482; Referee: Petr Ardeleanu (Czech Republic)

6 September 2019 EURO 2020 Q	San Marino	0–4	Belgium	Serravalle, San Marino
20:45 (20:45 UTC+2)		Report	Batshuayi 43' (pen.), 90+2'; Mertens 57'; Chadli 64'	Stadium: San Marino Stadium; Attendance: 2,523; Referee: Horațiu Feșnic (Romania)

9 September 2019 EURO 2020 Q	Scotland	0–4	Belgium	Glasgow, Scotland
20:45 (19:45 UTC+1)		Report	R. Lukaku 9'; Vermaelen 24'; Alderweireld 32'; De Bruyne 82'	Stadium: Hampden Park; Attendance: 25,524; Referee: Paweł Gil (Poland)

10 October 2019 EURO 2020 Q	Belgium	9–0	San Marino	Brussels, Belgium
20:45 (20:45 UTC+2)	R. Lukaku 28', 41'; Chadli 31'; Brolli 35' (o.g.); Alderweireld 43'; Tielemans 45+1'; Benteke 79'; Verschaeren 84' (pen.); Castagne 90'	Report		Stadium: King Baudouin Stadium; Attendance: 34,504; Referee: Anastasios Papapetrou (Greece)

13 October 2019 EURO 2020 Q	Kazakhstan	0–2	Belgium	Nur-Sultan, Kazakhstan
15:00 (19:00 UTC+6)		Report	Batshuayi 21'; Meunier 53'	Stadium: Astana Arena; Attendance: 26,801; Referee: Gediminas Mažeika (Lithuania)

16 November 2019 EURO 2020 Q	Russia	1–4	Belgium	Saint Petersburg, Russia
18:00 (20:00 UTC+3)	Dzhikiya 79'	Report	T. Hazard 19'; E. Hazard 33', 40'; R. Lukaku 72'	Stadium: Krestovsky Stadium; Attendance: 53,317; Referee: Artur Soares Dias (Portugal)

19 November 2019 EURO 2020 Q	Belgium	6–1	Cyprus	Brussels, Belgium
20:45 (20:45 UTC+1)	Benteke 16', 68'; De Bruyne 36', 42'; Carrasco 44'; Christoforou 51' (o.g.)	Report	N. Ioannou 14'	Stadium: King Baudouin Stadium; Attendance: 40,568; Referee: Jørgen Burchardt (Denmark)

== See also ==
- Competitive record of the Belgium national football team (with tournament history and all-time team record)
