= Bramati =

Bramati is an Italian surname. Notable people with the surname include:

- Davide Bramati (born 1968), Italian cyclist
- Fabrizio Bramati (born 1993), Italian footballer
- Luca Bramati (born 1968), Italian cyclist
