= Mirko Palazzi =

Italian-Sammarinese footballer (born 1987)

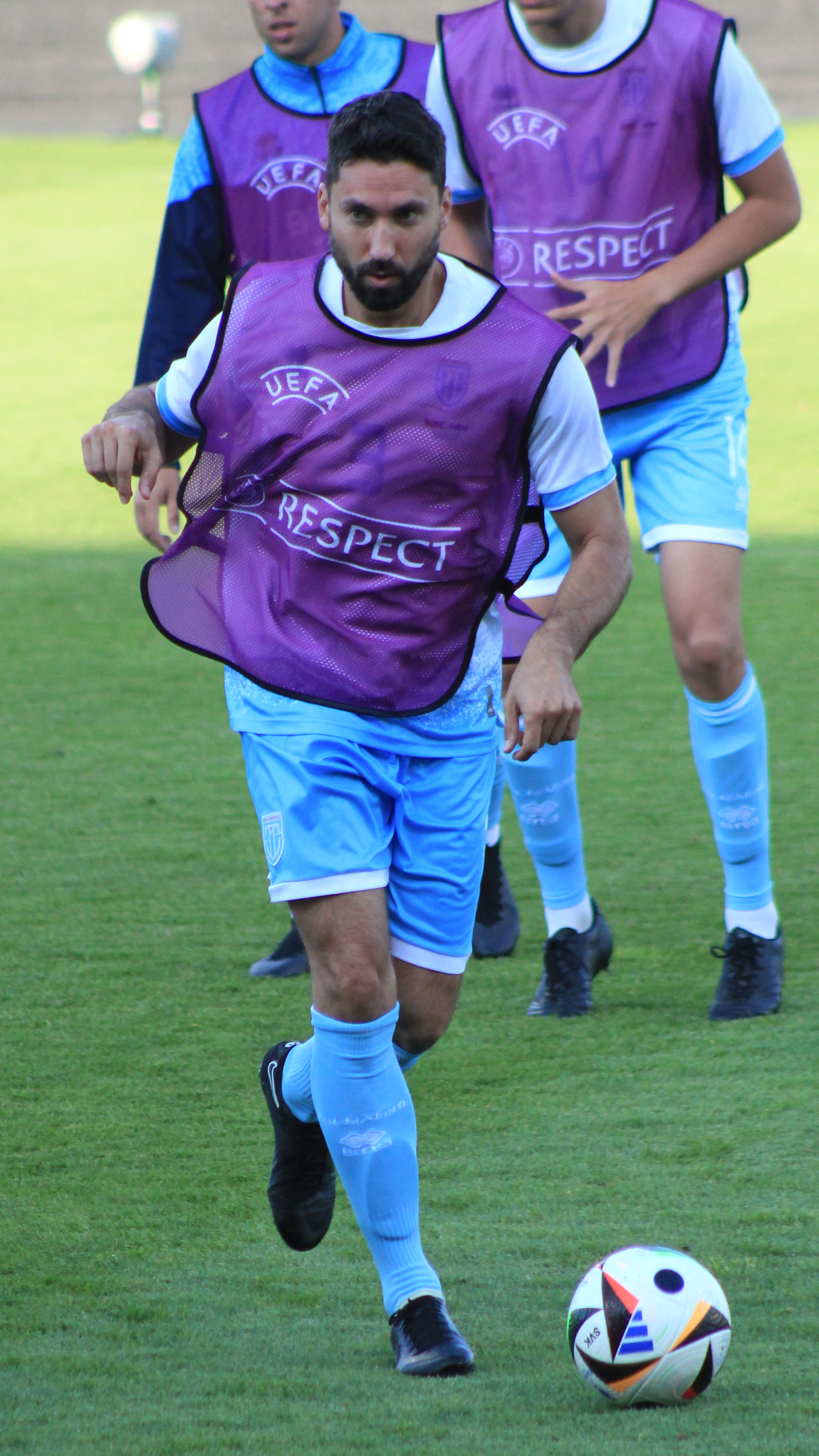
- Palazzi with San Marino against Slovakia (2024)

Personal information
- Date of birth: 21 March 1987 (age 39)
- Place of birth: Rimini, Italy
- Height: 1.83 m (6 ft 0 in)
- Positions: Left-back; centre-back

Team information
- Current team: Tre Penne
- Number: 3

Youth career
- Rimini

Senior career*
Years	Team	Apps	(Gls)
2006–2007	Castelnuovo	1	(0)
2007	Bellaria	0	(0)
2007–2009	Verucchio	55	(1)
2009–2010	Tre Penne	21	(12)
2010–2013	Rimini	52	(4)
2013–2014	Cosenza	21	(0)
2014	Tre Penne	2	(1)
2014–2015	San Marino	8	(0)
2015–2016	Gualdo Casacastalda	24	(2)
2016–2019	Tre Penne	63	(10)
2019–2020	Marignanese		
2020	Tre Penne	4	(0)
2020	Marignanese		
2020–2021	Cattolica	21	(0)
2021	Tre Penne	0	(0)
2021–2022	Cattolica	17	(0)
2022–2024	Cosmos	53	(0)
2024–	Tre Penne	36	(2)

International career^{‡}
2005–	San Marino	75	(1)
- * Club domestic league appearances and goals as of 5 June 2026 ‡ National team caps and goals as of 5 June 2024

Mirko Palazzi (born 21 March 1987) is an Italian-Sammarinese footballer who plays as a defender for Tre Penne and the San Marino national team.

== Club career ==
A right back, Palazzi for a while was the only professional Sanmarinese footballer. He started his career at hometown club Rimini. However Palazzi only played once in 2006–07 Serie C2. Palazzi then played 2 seasons in Serie D for Verucchio, a local side within the Province of Rimini. Palazzi played for Sanmarinese amateur club Tre Penne. He scored two goals in 2010–11 UEFA Europa League before returned to Rimini for the re-established Rimini: A.C. Rimini 1912 with the new entity being admitted Serie D after the old entity was expelled from Lega Pro. A.C. Rimini was promoted in that season as the winner of inter-group promotion playoffs. Ahead of the 2019-20 season, Palazzi joined Italian club AS San Giovanni Marignanese.

== International career ==
He was first called-up to the San Marino national football team in 2005 ahead of their match in Sarajevo against Bosnia and Herzegovina national football team. He was capped in the last two matches of 2006 FIFA World Cup qualification (UEFA), as well as also featuring in a game in UEFA Euro 2008 qualifying.

He scored his first international goal for San Marino against Azerbaijan national football team in a FIFA World Cup qualification match in 2017, in a 5-1 defeat.

=== International goals ===
Scores and results list San Marino's goal tally first.

No	Date	Venue	Opponent	Score	Result	Competition
1.	4 September 2017	Bakcell Arena, Baku, Azerbaijan	Azerbaijan	1–4	1–5	2018 FIFA World Cup qualification

== Personal life ==
He was born in Rimini, Emilia–Romagna, Italy to an Italian father and a Sammarinese mother. Palazzi works as a sales advisor while also playing football.

== Career statistics ==
=== Club ===
Appearances and goals by club, season and competition
Club	Season	League			National cup		Europe		Other		Total	
Club	Season	Division	Apps	Goals	Apps	Goals	Apps	Goals	Apps	Goals	Apps	Goals
