= UEFA Euro 2020 qualifying Group I =

Football tournament qualifying stage

Group I of UEFA Euro 2020 qualifying was one of the ten groups to decide which teams would qualify for the UEFA Euro 2020 finals tournament. Group I consisted of six teams: Belgium, Cyprus, Kazakhstan, Russia, San Marino and Scotland, where they played against each other home-and-away in a round-robin format.

The top two teams, Belgium and Russia, qualified directly for the finals. Unlike previous editions, the participants of the play-offs were not decided based on results from the qualifying group stage, but instead based on their performance in the 2018–19 UEFA Nations League.

Belgium won all ten of their matches, becoming the seventh national side to qualify for a European Championship with a 100% record, and the eighth instance, after France (1992 and 2004), Czech Republic (2000), Germany, Spain (both 2012), England (2016), and Italy (2020).

== Standings ==
Pos	Team	Pld	W	D	L	GF	GA	GD	Pts	Qualification	(Belgium)	(Russia)	(Scotland)	(Cyprus)	(Kazakhstan)	(San Marino)
1	Belgium	10	10	0	0	40	3	+37	30	Qualify for final tournament	—	3–1	3–0	6–1	3–0	9–0
2	Russia	10	8	0	2	33	8	+25	24	Qualify for final tournament	1–4	—	4–0	1–0	1–0	9–0
3	Scotland	10	5	0	5	16	19	−3	15	Advance to play-offs via Nations League	0–4	1–2	—	2–1	3–1	6–0
4	Cyprus	10	3	1	6	15	20	−5	10 (Note: Head-to-head points: Cyprus 4, Kazakhstan 1.)		0–2	0–5	1–2	—	1–1	5–0
5	Kazakhstan	10	3	1	6	13	17	−4	10		0–2	0–4	3–0	1–2	—	4–0
6	San Marino	10	0	0	10	1	51	−50	0		0–4	0–5	0–2	0–4	1–3	—

Source: UEFA
Rules for classification: Qualification tiebreakers

== Matches ==
The fixtures were released by UEFA the same day as the draw, which was held on 2 December 2018 in Dublin. Times are CET/CEST, (Note: CET (UTC+1) for matches in March and November 2019, and CEST (UTC+2) for all other matches.) as listed by UEFA (local times, if different, are in parentheses).

21 March 2019
16:00 (21:00 UTC+6)

Kazakhstan	3–0	Scotland
Pertsukh 6'; Vorogovskiy 10'; Zaynutdinov 51'	Report

Astana Arena, Astana
Attendance: 27,641
Referee: Srđan Jovanović (Serbia)
21 March 2019
18:00 (19:00 UTC+2)

Cyprus	5–0	San Marino
Sotiriou 19' (pen.), 23' (pen.); Kousoulos 26'; Efrem 31'; Laifis 56'	Report

GSP Stadium, Nicosia
Attendance: 3,175
Referee: Juri Frischer (Estonia)
21 March 2019
20:45

Belgium	3–1	Russia
Tielemans 14'; E. Hazard 45' (pen.), 88'	Report	Cheryshev 16'

King Baudouin Stadium, Brussels
Attendance: 34,245
Referee: Ovidiu Hațegan (Romania)

24 March 2019
15:00 (20:00 UTC+6)

Kazakhstan	0–4	Russia
	Report	Cheryshev 19', 45+2'; Dzyuba 52'; Beisebekov 62' (o.g.)

Astana Arena, Nur-Sultan
Attendance: 29,582
Referee: Slavko Vinčić (Slovenia)
24 March 2019
18:00

San Marino	0–2	Scotland
	Report	McLean 4'; Russell 74'

San Marino Stadium, Serravalle
Attendance: 4,077
Referee: Manuel Schüttengruber (Austria)
24 March 2019
20:45 (21:45 UTC+2)

Cyprus	0–2	Belgium
	Report	E. Hazard 10'; Batshuayi 18'

GSP Stadium, Nicosia
Attendance: 8,728
Referee: François Letexier (France)

8 June 2019
18:00 (19:00 UTC+3)

Russia	9–0	San Marino
Cevoli 25' (o.g.); Dzyuba 31' (pen.), 73', 76', 88'; Kudryashov 36'; An. Miranchuk 41'; Smolov 77', 83'	Report

Mordovia Arena, Saransk
Attendance: 42,241
Referee: Mohammed Al-Hakim (Sweden)
8 June 2019
20:45

Belgium	3–0	Kazakhstan
Mertens 11'; Castagne 14'; Lukaku 50'	Report

King Baudouin Stadium, Brussels
Attendance: 37,155
Referee: Irfan Peljto (Bosnia and Herzegovina)
8 June 2019
20:45 (19:45 UTC+1)

Scotland	2–1	Cyprus
Robertson 61'; Burke 89'	Report	Kousoulos 87'

Hampden Park, Glasgow
Attendance: 31,277
Referee: Ola Hobber Nilsen (Norway)

11 June 2019
16:00 (20:00 UTC+6)

Kazakhstan	4–0	San Marino
Kuat 45+1'; Fedin 62'; Suyumbayev 65'; Islamkhan 79'	Report

Astana Arena, Nur-Sultan
Attendance: 18,652
Referee: Bartosz Frankowski (Poland)
11 June 2019
20:45

Belgium	3–0	Scotland
Lukaku 45+1', 57'; De Bruyne 90+2'	Report

King Baudouin Stadium, Brussels
Attendance: 32,482
Referee: Petr Ardeleánu (Czech Republic)
11 June 2019
20:45 (21:45 UTC+3)

Russia	1–0	Cyprus
Ionov 38'	Report

Nizhny Novgorod Stadium, Nizhny Novgorod
Attendance: 42,228
Referee: Marco Di Bello (Italy)

6 September 2019
18:00 (19:00 UTC+3)

Cyprus	1–1	Kazakhstan
Sotiriou 39'	Report	Shchotkin 2'

GSP Stadium, Nicosia
Attendance: 5,639
Referee: Mattias Gestranius (Finland)
6 September 2019
20:45

San Marino	0–4	Belgium
	Report	Batshuayi 43' (pen.), 90+2'; Mertens 57'; Chadli 63'

San Marino Stadium, Serravalle
Attendance: 2,523
Referee: Horațiu Feșnic (Romania)
6 September 2019
20:45 (19:45 UTC+1)

Scotland	1–2	Russia
McGinn 11'	Report	Dzyuba 40'; O'Donnell 59' (o.g.)

Hampden Park, Glasgow
Attendance: 32,432
Referee: Anastasios Sidiropoulos (Greece)

9 September 2019
20:45

Russia	1–0	Kazakhstan
Fernandes 89'	Report

Kaliningrad Stadium, Kaliningrad
Attendance: 31,818
Referee: Nikola Dabanović (Montenegro)
9 September 2019
20:45

San Marino	0–4	Cyprus
	Report	Kousoulos 2', 73'; Papoulis 39'; Artymatas 75'

San Marino Stadium, Serravalle
Attendance: 662
Referee: Iwan Arwel Griffith (Wales)
9 September 2019
20:45 (19:45 UTC+1)

Scotland	0–4	Belgium
	Report	Lukaku 9'; Vermaelen 24'; Alderweireld 32'; De Bruyne 82'

Hampden Park, Glasgow
Attendance: 25,524
Referee: Paweł Gil (Poland)

10 October 2019
16:00 (20:00 UTC+6)

Kazakhstan	1–2	Cyprus
Yerlanov 34'	Report	Sotiriou 73'; N. Ioannou 84'

Astana Arena, Nur-Sultan
Attendance: 11,769
Referee: Craig Pawson (England)
10 October 2019
20:45

Belgium	9–0	San Marino
Lukaku 28', 41'; Chadli 31'; Brolli 35' (o.g.); Alderweireld 43'; Tielemans 45+1'; Benteke 79'; Verschaeren 84' (pen.); Castagne 90'	Report

King Baudouin Stadium, Brussels
Attendance: 34,504
Referee: Anastasios Papapetrou (Greece)
10 October 2019
20:45 (21:45 UTC+3)

Russia	4–0	Scotland
Dzyuba 57', 70'; Ozdoyev 60'; Golovin 84'	Report

Luzhniki Stadium, Moscow
Attendance: 65,703
Referee: Jakob Kehlet (Denmark)

13 October 2019
15:00 (19:00 UTC+6)

Kazakhstan	0–2	Belgium
	Report	Batshuayi 21'; Meunier 53'

Astana Arena, Nur-Sultan
Attendance: 26,801
Referee: Gediminas Mažeika (Lithuania)
13 October 2019
18:00 (19:00 UTC+3)

Cyprus	0–5	Russia
	Report	Cheryshev 9', 90+2'; Ozdoyev 23'; Dzyuba 79'; Golovin 89'

GSP Stadium, Nicosia
Attendance: 9,439
Referee: Srđan Jovanović (Serbia)
13 October 2019
18:00 (17:00 UTC+1)

Scotland	6–0	San Marino
McGinn 12', 27', 45+1'; Shankland 65'; Findlay 67'; Armstrong 87'	Report

Hampden Park, Glasgow
Attendance: 20,699
Referee: Jérôme Brisard (France)

16 November 2019
15:00 (16:00 UTC+2)

Cyprus	1–2	Scotland
Efrem 47'	Report	Christie 12'; McGinn 53'

GSP Stadium, Nicosia
Attendance: 7,595
Referee: Harald Lechner (Austria)
16 November 2019
18:00 (20:00 UTC+3)

Russia	1–4	Belgium
Dzhikiya 79'	Report	T. Hazard 19'; E. Hazard 33', 40'; Lukaku 72'

Krestovsky Stadium, Saint Petersburg
Attendance: 53,317
Referee: Artur Soares Dias (Portugal)
16 November 2019
18:00

San Marino	1–3	Kazakhstan
Berardi 77'	Report	Zaynutdinov 6'; Suyumbayev 22'; Shchotkin 26'

San Marino Stadium, Serravalle
Attendance: 643
Referee: Ali Palabıyık (Turkey)

19 November 2019
20:45

Belgium	6–1	Cyprus
Benteke 16', 68'; De Bruyne 36', 41'; Carrasco 44'; Christoforou 51' (o.g.)	Report	N. Ioannou 14'

King Baudouin Stadium, Brussels
Attendance: 40,568
Referee: Jørgen Burchardt (Denmark)
19 November 2019
20:45

San Marino	0–5	Russia
	Report	Kuzyayev 3'; Petrov 19'; Al. Miranchuk 49'; Ionov 56'; Komlichenko 78'

San Marino Stadium, Serravalle
Attendance: 1,604
Referee: Thorvaldur Árnason (Iceland)
19 November 2019
20:45 (19:45 UTC+0)

Scotland	3–1	Kazakhstan
McGinn 48', 90+1'; Naismith 64'	Report	Zaynutdinov 34'

Hampden Park, Glasgow
Attendance: 19,515
Referee: Bas Nijhuis (Netherlands)

== Goalscorers ==
There were 118 goals scored in 30 matches, for an average of 3.93 goals per match.

9 goals

- (Russia national football team) Artem Dzyuba

7 goals

- (Belgium national football team) Romelu Lukaku
- (Scotland national football team) John McGinn

5 goals

- (Belgium national football team) Eden Hazard
- (Russia national football team) Denis Cheryshev

4 goals

- (Belgium national football team) Michy Batshuayi
- (Belgium national football team) Kevin De Bruyne
- (Cyprus national football team) Ioannis Kousoulos
- (Cyprus national football team) Pieros Sotiriou

3 goals

- (Belgium national football team) Christian Benteke
- (Kazakhstan national football team) Baktiyar Zaynutdinov

2 goals

- (Belgium national football team) Toby Alderweireld
- (Belgium national football team) Timothy Castagne
- (Belgium national football team) Nacer Chadli
- (Belgium national football team) Dries Mertens
- (Belgium national football team) Youri Tielemans
- (Cyprus national football team) Georgios Efrem
- (Cyprus national football team) Nicholas Ioannou
- (Kazakhstan national football team) Aleksey Shchotkin
- (Kazakhstan national football team) Gafurzhan Suyumbayev
- (Russia national football team) Aleksandr Golovin
- (Russia national football team) Aleksei Ionov
- (Russia national football team) Magomed Ozdoyev
- (Russia national football team) Fyodor Smolov

1 goal

- (Belgium national football team) Yannick Carrasco
- (Belgium national football team) Thorgan Hazard
- (Belgium national football team) Thomas Meunier
- (Belgium national football team) Thomas Vermaelen
- (Belgium national football team) Yari Verschaeren
- (Cyprus national football team) Kostakis Artymatas
- (Cyprus national football team) Konstantinos Laifis
- (Cyprus national football team) Fotios Papoulis
- (Kazakhstan national football team) Maxim Fedin
- (Kazakhstan national football team) Bauyrzhan Islamkhan
- (Kazakhstan national football team) Islambek Kuat
- (Kazakhstan national football team) Yuriy Pertsukh
- (Kazakhstan national football team) Yan Vorogovskiy
- (Kazakhstan national football team) Temirlan Yerlanov
- (Russia national football team) Georgi Dzhikiya
- (Russia national football team) Mário Fernandes
- (Russia national football team) Nikolay Komlichenko
- (Russia national football team) Fyodor Kudryashov
- (Russia national football team) Daler Kuzyayev
- (Russia national football team) Aleksei Miranchuk
- (Russia national football team) Anton Miranchuk
- (Russia national football team) Sergei Petrov
- (San Marino national football team) Filippo Berardi
- (Scotland national football team) Stuart Armstrong
- (Scotland national football team) Oliver Burke
- (Scotland national football team) Ryan Christie
- (Scotland national football team) Stuart Findlay
- (Scotland national football team) Kenny McLean
- (Scotland national football team) Steven Naismith
- (Scotland national football team) Andrew Robertson
- (Scotland national football team) Johnny Russell
- (Scotland national football team) Lawrence Shankland

1 own goal

- (Cyprus national football team) Kypros Christoforou (against Belgium)
- (Kazakhstan national football team) Abzal Beisebekov (against Russia)
- (San Marino national football team) Cristian Brolli (against Belgium)
- (San Marino national football team) Michele Cevoli (against Russia)
- (Scotland national football team) Stephen O'Donnell (against Russia)

== Discipline ==
A player was automatically suspended for the next match for the following offences:

- Receiving a red card (red card suspensions could be extended for serious offences)
- Receiving three yellow cards in three different matches, as well as after fifth and any subsequent yellow card (yellow card suspensions were not carried forward to the play-offs, the finals or any other future international matches)

The following suspensions were served during the qualifying matches:

Team	Player	Offence(s)	Suspended for match(es)
Cyprus	Konstantinos Laifis	(red card) vs Russia (13 October 2019)	vs Scotland (16 November 2019)
Kazakhstan	Islambek Kuat	(yellow card) vs Russia (24 March 2019); (yellow card) vs Belgium (8 June 2019); (yellow card) vs Cyprus (10 October 2019)	vs Belgium (13 October 2019)
Kazakhstan	Gafurzhan Suyumbayev	(yellow card) vs Scotland (21 March 2019); (yellow card) vs Russia (24 March 2019); (yellow card) vs Cyprus (6 September 2019)	vs Russia (9 September 2019)
Russia	Aleksandr Golovin	(yellow card) (yellow-red card) vs Belgium (21 March 2019)	vs Kazakhstan (24 March 2019)
San Marino	Davide Simoncini	(yellow card) vs Cyprus (21 March 2019); (yellow card) vs Belgium (6 September 2019); (yellow card) vs Belgium (10 October 2019)	vs Scotland (13 October 2019)
Scotland	Scott McTominay	(yellow card) vs San Marino (24 March 2019); (yellow card) vs Belgium (11 June 2019); (yellow card) vs Belgium (9 September 2019)	vs Russia (10 October 2019)
