= 2010 UEFA European Under-19 Championship qualification =

2010 UEFA U-19 Championship (qualifying round) was the first round of qualifications for the final tournament of 2010 UEFA European Under-19 Championship. The final tournament of the 2010 UEFA European Under-19 Championship is preceded by two qualification stages: a qualifying round and an Elite round. During these rounds, 52 national teams competed to determine the seven teams that will join the already qualified host nation France.

The first qualifying round was played between 1 September and 30 November 2009. The 52 teams were divided into 13 groups of four teams, with each group being contested as a mini-tournament, hosted by one of the group's teams. After all matches have been played, the 13 group winners and 13 group runners-up advanced to the Elite round. Alongside the 26 winner and runner-up teams, the two best third-placed teams also qualified.

== First qualification round groups ==
=== Group 1 ===
Team	Pld	W	D	L	GF	GA	GD	Pts
Italy	3	3	0	0	11	0	+11	9
Republic of Ireland	3	2	0	1	7	2	+5	6
Albania	3	1	0	2	4	8	−4	3
San Marino (H)	3	0	0	3	1	13	−12	0

(H) Hosts
13 November 2009
13:30 CET

Italy	5 – 0	Albania
Dumitru 21'; D'Alessandro 43'; Destro 53'; Zigoni 78', 82'	Report

Stadio Olimpico, Serravalle
Referee: Sandor Szabo (Hungary)

13 November 2009
16:00 CET

Republic of Ireland	5 – 0	San Marino
Henderson 17'; Mason 43', 58'; Adam 74'; Keohane 86'	Report

Montecchio, San Marino
Referee: Maxim Layushkin (Russia)

15 November 2009
14:30 CET

Republic of Ireland	2 – 0	Albania
Doran 56' (pen.); Henderson 84'	Report

Montecchio, San Marino
Referee: Sandor Szabo (Hungary)

15 November 2009
20:30 CET

San Marino	0 – 4	Italy
	Report	Brolli 71' (o.g.); Zigoni 74'; Destro 86', 90+2'

Stadio Olimpico, Serravalle
Referee: Gediminas Mazeika (Lithuania)

18 November 2009
15:00 CET

Italy	2 – 0	Republic of Ireland
Destro 62', 64'	Report

Stadio Olimpico, Serravalle
Referee: Maxim Layushkin (Russia)

18 November 2009
17:00 CET

Albania	4 – 1	San Marino
Vajushi 44'; Balaj 66', 68'; Koni 88'	Report; Report2	Stefanelli 72' (pen.)

Stadio Olimpico, Serravalle
Referee: Gediminas Mazeika (Lithuania)

=== Group 2 ===
Team	Pld	W	D	L	GF	GA	GD	Pts
England	3	3	0	0	8	2	+6	9
Slovakia	3	2	0	1	5	2	+3	6
Finland	3	1	0	2	3	7	−4	3
Slovenia (H)	3	0	0	3	1	6	−5	0

(H) Hosts
9 October 2009

Slovakia	1 – 0	Slovenia
Guba 31'	Report

Športni park Lendava, Lendava
Referee: Gerhard Grobelnik (Austria)

9 October 2009

England	3 – 1	Finland
Delfouneso 5'; Mellis 16'; Parrett 90+2'	Report	Riski 34'

Fazanerija, Murska Sobota
Referee: Hüseyin Göçek (Turkey)

11 October 2009

Slovakia	4 – 0	Finland
Vavrik 6'; Slančík 69'; Považanec 75'; Guba 76'	Report

Športni park Lendava, Lendava
Referee: Hüseyin Göçek (Turkey)

11 October 2009

Slovenia	1 – 3	England
Vrhunc 90+3'	Report	Donaldson 41'; Mellis 64'; Deacon 80' (pen.)

Fazanerija, Murska Sobota
Referee: Albert Toussaint (Luxembourg)

14 October 2009

England	2 – 0	Slovakia
Mason 64'; Mellis 90+3'	Report

Športni park Lendava, Lendava
Referee: Gerhard Grobelnik (Austria)

14 October 2009

Finland	2 – 0	Slovenia
Riski 24' (pen.); Westö 86'	Report

Fazanerija, Murska Sobota
Referee: Albert Toussaint (Luxembourg)

=== Group 3 ===
Team	Pld	W	D	L	GF	GA	GD	Pts
Turkey	3	2	1	0	4	2	+2	7
Germany	3	2	0	1	9	2	+7	6
Moldova	3	1	0	2	2	7	−5	3
Luxembourg (H)	3	0	1	2	2	6	−4	1

(H) Hosts
7 October 2009

Turkey	1 – 0	Moldova
Karakullukçu 66'	Report

Stade Rodange, Rodange
Referee: Stuart Attwell (England)

7 October 2009

Germany	3 – 0	Luxembourg
Terrazzino 44', 49'; Clemens 78'	Report

Stade Alphonse Theis, Hesperange
Referee: Lars Christoffersen (Denmark)

9 October 2009

Moldova	0 – 5	Germany
	Report	Tosun 8', 13'; Kroos 40'; Terrazzino 62'; Clemens 66'

Stade Alphonse Theis, Hesperange
Referee: Nikola Dabanović (Montenegro)

9 October 2009

Turkey	1 – 1	Luxembourg
Helvacı 59'	Report	R. De Sousa 90+2'

Stade Rodange, Rodange
Referee: Lars Christoffersen (Denmark)

12 October 2009

Germany	1 – 2	Turkey
Tosun 87'	Report	Odabaşı 31'; Ergen 46'

Stade Josy Barthel, Luxembourg
Referee: Stuart Attwell (England)

12 October 2009

Luxembourg	1 – 2	Moldova
R. De Sousa 67'	Report	Onofrei 22'; Golubovschi 80'

Op Biirk, Mensdorf
Referee: Nikola Dabanović (Montenegro)

=== Group 4 ===
Team	Pld	W	D	L	GF	GA	GD	Pts
Croatia	3	3	0	0	6	1	+5	9
Switzerland	3	2	0	1	10	1	+9	6
Lithuania (H)	3	1	0	2	3	8	−5	3
Estonia	3	0	0	3	1	10	−9	0

(H) Hosts
23 September 2009

Switzerland	5 – 0	Lithuania
Aratore 44'; Shaqiri 71', 79'; Mehmedi 89'; Mihajlović 90+3'	Report

Marijampolė Stadium, Marijampolė
Referee: Libor Kovařík (Czech Republic)

23 September 2009

Croatia	3 – 0	Estonia
Andrijašević 7' (pen.); Maglica 18'; Ivanović 69'	Report

Sūduva Stadium, Marijampolė
Referee: Arman Amirkhanyan (Armenia)

25 September 2009

Switzerland	5 – 0	Estonia
Pasche 3'; Mehmedi 25' (pen.); Zuber 69', 75'; Shaqiri 88'	Report

Sūduva Stadium, Marijampolė
Referee: Arman Amirkhanyan (Armenia)

25 September 2009

Lithuania	1 – 2	Croatia
Solomin 26'	Report	Andrijašević 74'; Ivanović 80'

Marijampolė Stadium, Marijampolė
Referee: Richard Liesveld (Netherlands)

28 September 2009

Croatia	1 – 0	Switzerland
Maglica 33'	Report

Sūduva Stadium, Marijampolė
Referee: Richard Liesveld (Netherlands)

28 September 2009

Estonia	1 – 2	Lithuania
Teino 83'	Report	Lukošius 49'; Biskys 75'

Marijampolė Stadium, Marijampolė
Referee: Libor Kovařík (Czech Republic)

=== Group 5 ===
Team	Pld	W	D	L	GF	GA	GD	Pts
Serbia (H)	3	3	0	0	8	0	+8	9
Greece	3	2	0	1	3	1	+2	6
Faroe Islands	3	0	1	2	0	4	−4	1
Belarus	3	0	1	2	0	6	−6	1

(H) Hosts
6 October 2009

Greece	2 – 0	Faroe Islands
Vasiliou 56' (pen.); Simosis 77'	Report

Stadion FK Jagodina, Jagodina
Referee: Vladimír Vnuk (Slovakia)

6 October 2009

Serbia	5 – 0	Belarus
Miljković 36'; Đuričić 47'; Šćepović 67' (pen.); Marković 75'; Brkić 90'	Report

Čika Dača Stadium, Kragujevac
Referee: Alan Muir (Scotland)

8 October 2009

Greece	1 – 0	Belarus
Karelis 59'	Report

Čika Dača Stadium, Kragujevac
Referee: Pol van Boekel (Netherlands)

8 October 2009

Faroe Islands	0 – 2	Serbia
	Report	Šćepović 30', 42' (pen.)

Stadion FK Jagodina, Jagodina
Referee: Vladimír Vnuk (Slovakia)

11 October 2009

Serbia	1 – 0	Greece
Šćepović 45'	Report

Čika Dača Stadium, Kragujevac
Referee: Pol van Boekel (Netherlands)

11 October 2009

Belarus	0 – 0	Faroe Islands
	Report

Stadion FK Jagodina, Jagodina
Referee: Danilo Mihajlović (Serbia)

=== Group 6 ===
Team	Pld	W	D	L	GF	GA	GD	Pts
Scotland	3	2	0	1	9	2	+7	6
Romania	3	2	0	1	5	3	+2	6
Austria (H)	3	2	0	1	6	5	+1	6
Armenia	3	0	0	3	2	12	−10	0

(H) Hosts
10 October 2009

Scotland	3 – 0	Romania
McHugh 19'; Campbell 21'; Inman 81'	Report

Jacques Lemans Arena, Sankt Veit an der Glan
Referee: Vladislav Bezborodov (Russia)

10 October 2009

Austria	5 – 1	Armenia
Klem 26', 90+3'; Schimpelsberger 32'; Huspek 62', 90+5'	Report	Badalyan 53'

Wigo-Haus Arena, Feldkirchen
Referee: Anders Hermansen (Denmark)

12 October 2009

Armenia	1 – 6	Scotland
Stepanyan 59'	Report	Inman 12'; Forrest 17', 26'; McHugh 71'; Burns 81'; Wilson 84'

Wigo-Haus Arena, Feldkirchen
Referee: Anders Hermansen (Denmark)

12 October 2009

Austria	0 – 4	Romania
	Report	Albu 21'; Alibec 23'; Tucudean 48'; Matei 86'

Jacques Lemans Arena, Sankt Veit an der Glan
Referee: Alan Black (Northern Ireland)

15 October 2009

Scotland	0 – 1	Austria
	Report	Klem 83'

Jacques Lemans Arena, Sankt Veit an der Glan
Referee: Vladislav Bezborodov (Russia)

15 October 2009

Romania	1 – 0	Armenia
Stoian 13' (pen.)	Report

Villach-Lind, Villach
Referee: Alan Black (Northern Ireland)

=== Group 7 ===
Team	Pld	W	D	L	GF	GA	GD	Pts
Bosnia and Herzegovina (H)	3	2	0	1	3	5	−2	6
Northern Ireland	3	1	2	0	5	1	+4	5
Iceland	3	1	1	1	3	3	0	4
Bulgaria	3	0	1	2	4	6	−2	1

(H) Hosts
7 October 2009

Bulgaria	1 – 1	Northern Ireland
Adzhov 90+2'	Report	Ferguson 62'

Grbavica Stadium, Sarajevo
Referee: Tom Harald Hagen (Norway)

7 October 2009

Iceland	0 – 1	Bosnia and Herzegovina
	Report	Nuhić 21'

Asim Ferhatović Hase Stadium, Sarajevo
Referee: Radek Příhoda (Czech Republic)

9 October 2009

Bulgaria	1 – 2	Bosnia and Herzegovina
Atanasov 2'	Report	Pandža 15'; Hadžić 87'

Asim Ferhatović Hase Stadium, Sarajevo
Referee: Radek Příhoda (Czech Republic)

9 October 2009

Northern Ireland	0 – 0	Iceland
	Report

Grbavica Stadium, Sarajevo
Referee: Carlos Miguel Taborda Xistra (Portugal)

12 October 2009

Iceland	3 – 2	Bulgaria
G. Magnússon 23'; Faye 53'; Geirsson 81'	Report	Bengyuzov 18'; Paskov 40'

Grbavica Stadium, Sarajevo
Referee: Carlos Miguel Taborda Xistra (Portugal)

12 October 2009

Bosnia and Herzegovina	0 – 4	Northern Ireland
	Report	Boyce 16'; Duffy 19', 49' (pen.); Ferguson 62'

Asim Ferhatović Hase Stadium, Sarajevo
Referee: Tom Harald Hagen (Norway)

=== Group 8 ===
Team	Pld	W	D	L	GF	GA	GD	Pts
Portugal	3	3	0	0	7	0	+7	9
Spain (H)	3	2	0	1	6	2	+4	6
Wales	3	1	0	2	3	5	−2	3
Macedonia	3	0	0	3	2	11	−9	0

(H) Hosts
3 November 2009

Portugal	3 – 0	Wales
S. Oliveira 3'; Reis 58'; Alex 76'	Report

Luis Suner Pico, Alzira
Referee: Augustus Viorel Constantin (Romania)

3 November 2009

Spain	5 – 1	Macedonia
Canales 18'; Rodrigo 28', 32'; Pacheco 76'; Keko 80'	Report	An. Stankov 39'

La Forana, Alginet
Referee: Tero Nieminen (Finland)

5 November 2009

Portugal	3 – 0	Macedonia
N. Oliveira 13'; Alex 51'; Caetano 56'	Report

La Forana, Alginet
Referee: Tero Nieminen (Finland)

5 November 2009

Wales	0 – 1	Spain
	Report	Rodrigo 50'

La Forana, Alginet
Referee: Andrea De Marco (Italy)

8 November 2009

Spain	0 – 1	Portugal
	Report	Pinto 19'

Luis Suner Pico, Alzira
Referee: Andrea De Marco (Italy)

8 November 2009

Macedonia	1 – 3	Wales
Shabani 60'	Report	Stephens 43'; J. Taylor 63'; Brown 90'

La Forana, Alginet
Referee: Augustus Viorel Constantin (Romania)

=== Group 9 ===
Team	Pld	W	D	L	GF	GA	GD	Pts
Russia	3	2	1	0	9	2	+7	7
Hungary (H)	3	2	0	1	10	3	+7	6
Latvia	3	1	1	1	6	6	0	4
Liechtenstein	3	0	0	3	0	14	−14	0

(H) Hosts
23 October 2009

Russia	1 – 1	Latvia
Logua 21' (pen.)	Report	Karašausks 3'

Tiszaújváros Stadion, Tiszaújváros
Attendance: 105
Referee: Vassilios Pamporidis (Greece)

23 October 2009

Hungary	4 – 0	Liechtenstein
Skriba 58'; Márkus 61'; Gür 88' (o.g.); Simon 90+3'	Report

Városi Stadion, Nyíregyháza
Attendance: 1300
Referee: Stanislav Todorov (Bulgaria)

25 October 2009

Liechtenstein	0 – 6	Russia
	Report	Stolyarenko 9'; Bashkirov 20'; Logua 51'; Zhestokov 59'; Pliyev 76'; Matyash 90+3'

Tiszaújváros Stadion, Tiszaújváros
Attendance: 100
Referee: Stanislav Todorov (Bulgaria)

25 October 2009

Hungary	5 - 1	Latvia
Márkus 6', 18'; Tischler 25'; Laczkovich 44'; Simon 90+3'	Report	Zjuzins 3'

Városi Stadion, Nyíregyháza
Attendance: 1700
Referee: Olivier Thual (France)

28 October 2009

Russia	2 - 1	Hungary
Nagy 27' (o.g.); Logua 56'	Report	Stieber 90+2'

Városi Stadion, Nyíregyháza
Attendance: 2000
Referee: Olivier Thual (France)

28 October 2009

Latvia	4 - 0	Liechtenstein
Ignatāns 10', 55' (pen.); Zjuzins 16', 37'	Report

Tiszaújváros Stadion, Tiszaújváros
Attendance: 50
Referee: Vassilios Pamporidis (Greece)

=== Group 10 ===
Team	Pld	W	D	L	GF	GA	GD	Pts
Netherlands	3	3	0	0	7	1	+6	9
Czech Republic	3	2	0	1	7	2	+5	6
Malta (H)	3	0	1	2	1	6	−5	1
Cyprus	3	0	1	2	3	9	−6	1

(H) Hosts
12 November 2009

Netherlands	1 – 0	Malta
De Roon 62'	Report

Centenary Stadium, Ta' Qali
Referee: Adrian Mccourt (Northern Ireland)

12 November 2009

Czech Republic	3 – 1	Cyprus
Musiol 56', 87'; Skalák 78'	Report	Vasiliou 75'

Centenary Stadium, Ta' Qali
Referee: Michael Lerjeus (Sweden)

14 November 2009

Netherlands	5 – 1	Cyprus
Van La Parra 26'; Bacuna 35'; Castillion 39'; Burnet 66'; Vicento 88'	Report	Najah 86' (o.g.)

Centenary Stadium, Ta' Qali
Referee: Milorad Mažić (Serbia)

14 November 2009

Malta	0 – 4	Czech Republic
	Report	Krejčí 8'; Putz 13', 35'; Folprecht 29' (pen.)

Centenary Stadium, Ta' Qali
Referee: Adrian Mccourt (Northern Ireland)

17 November 2009

Czech Republic	0 – 1	Netherlands
	Report	Ebecilio 41'

Hibernians Ground, Paola
Referee: Michael Lerjeus (Sweden)

17 November 2009

Cyprus	1 – 1	Malta
Michael 88'	Report	C. Gauci 64'

Centenary Stadium, Ta' Qali
Referee: Milorad Mažić (Serbia)

=== Group 11 ===
Team	Pld	W	D	L	GF	GA	GD	Pts
Norway	3	3	0	0	11	2	+9	9
Belgium (H)	3	2	0	1	10	4	+6	6
Kazakhstan	3	1	0	2	2	7	−5	3
Andorra	3	0	0	3	1	11	−10	0

(H) Hosts
13 November 2009

Norway	2 – 0	Kazakhstan
Hedenstad 52' (pen.); Lehne Olsen 75'	Report

Puyenbeke Stadion, Sint-Niklaas
Referee: Pawel Gil (Poland)

13 November 2009

Belgium	4 – 0	Andorra
De Bruyne 43'; Bruno 59'; Bourdouxhe 72' (pen.); Longueville 88'	Report

Gemeentelijk Stadion, Hamme
Referee: Lasha Silagava (Georgia)

15 November 2009

Norway	5 – 0	Andorra
Lehne Olsen 23'; Henriksen 45'; Kastrati 65'; Wangberg 85'; Ringstad 90+2'	Report

Gemeentelijk Stadion, Hamme
Referee: Lasha Silagava (Georgia)

15 November 2009

Kazakhstan	0 – 4	Belgium
	Report	Kabasele 10', 62'; Bruno 57', 67' (pen.)

Freethiel Stadion, Beveren
Referee: Ante Vučemilović Šimunović, Jr. (Croatia)

18 November 2009

Belgium	2 – 4	Norway
Badibanga 72'; Durwael 85'	Report	Longueville 45+1' (o.g.); Johansen 54'; King 58' (pen.), 90'

Puyenbeke Stadion, Sint-Niklaas
Referee: Pawel Gil (Poland)

18 November 2009

Andorra	1 – 2	Kazakhstan
Vall 8'	Report	Kurmashev 34'; Lissenkov 54'

Freethiel Stadion, Beveren
Referee: Ante Vučemilović Šimunović, Jr. (Croatia)

=== Group 12 ===
Team	Pld	W	D	L	GF	GA	GD	Pts
Ukraine	3	2	1	0	3	1	+2	7
Montenegro	3	0	3	0	2	2	0	3
Georgia	3	0	2	1	1	2	−1	2
Sweden (H)	3	0	2	1	0	1	−1	2

(H) Hosts
9 October 2009

Sweden	0 – 0	Montenegro
	Report

Starke Arvid Arena, Ljungskile
Referee: Simon Lee Evans (Wales)

9 October 2009

Ukraine	1 – 0	Georgia
Partsvaniya 67'	Report

Edsborgs IP, Trollhättan
Referee: Jérome Efong Nzolo (Belgium)

11 October 2009

Sweden	0 – 0	Georgia
	Report

Edsborgs IP, Trollhättan
Referee: Jérome Efong Nzolo (Belgium)

11 October 2009

Montenegro	1 – 1	Ukraine
Vešović 86'	Report	Zadoya 50'

Rimnersvallen, Uddevalla
Referee: Ovidiu Alin Hategan (Romania)

14 October 2009

Ukraine	1 – 0	Sweden
Pavlov 73'	Report

Rimnersvallen, Uddevalla
Referee: Ovidiu Alin Hategan (Romania)

14 October 2009

Georgia	1 – 1	Montenegro
Ananidze 32'	Report	Denković 18'

Starke Arvid Arena, Ljungskile
Referee: Simon Lee Evans (Wales)

=== Group 13 ===
Team	Pld	W	D	L	GF	GA	GD	Pts
Denmark	3	2	0	1	5	2	+3	6
Azerbaijan	3	2	0	1	5	4	+1	6
Poland	3	1	1	1	4	4	0	4
Israel (H)	3	0	1	2	1	5	−4	1

(H) Hosts
9 October 2009

Poland	2 – 1	Denmark
Jonczyk 10'; Kucharczyk 62'	Report	Delaney 39'

Levita Stadium, Kfar Saba
Referee: Fernando Teixeira Vitienes (Spain)

9 October 2009

Israel	0 – 3	Azerbaijan
	Report	Hasanov 20', 84'; Isgandarov 30'

Ness Ziona Stadium, Ness Ziona
Referee: Hristo Ristoskov (Bulgaria)

11 October 2009

Poland	1 – 2	Azerbaijan
Kucharczyk 62'	Report	Abdullayev 40'; Seyidov 82'

Levita Stadium, Kfar Saba
Referee: Hristo Ristoskov (Bulgaria)

11 October 2009

Denmark	1 – 0	Israel
N. Jørgensen 90'	Report

Ness Ziona Stadium, Ness Ziona
Referee: Michael Koukoulakis (Greece)

14 October 2009

Israel	1 – 1	Poland
Levi 41'	Report	Hołota 24'

Ness Ziona Stadium, Ness Ziona
Referee: Fernando Teixeira Vitienes (Spain)

14 October 2009

Azerbaijan	0 – 3	Denmark
	Report	Stryger Larsen 27' (pen.), 39'; N. Jørgensen 79'

Levita Stadium, Kfar Saba
Referee: Michael Koukoulakis (Greece)

== Third-placed qualifiers ==
At the end of the first stage, a comparison was made between the third-placed teams from all groups. The two best third-placed teams advanced to the next round, with only the results against the top two teams from each group used for classifying the teams.

Grp	Team	Pld	W	D	L	GF	GA	GD	Pts
13	Poland	2	1	0	1	3	3	0	3
6	Austria	2	1	0	1	1	4	−3	3
12	Georgia	2	0	1	1	1	2	−1	1
7	Iceland	2	0	1	1	0	1	−1	1
9	Latvia	2	0	1	1	2	6	−4	1
5	Faroe Islands	2	0	0	2	0	4	−4	0
8	Wales	2	0	0	2	0	4	−4	0
10	Malta	2	0	0	2	0	5	−5	0
2	Finland	2	0	0	2	1	7	−6	0
4	Lithuania	2	0	0	2	1	7	−6	0
11	Kazakhstan	2	0	0	2	0	6	−6	0
3	Moldova	2	0	0	2	0	6	−6	0
1	Albania	2	0	0	2	0	7	−7	0

== Elite round ==
The Elite round was set to be played before the end of May 2010. The 28 teams advancing from the qualifying round were distributed into seven groups of four teams, with each group being contested in the same format as in the qualifying round. The seven group-winning teams will qualify for the final tournament in France.

Each team was allocated to one of four drawing pots, according to their qualifying round results. The seven sides with the best record were present in Pot A, and so forth until Pot D, which contained the seven teams with the weakest record. During the draw, each group was filled with one team from every pot, meaning that no team from the same pot could be drawn together. In the same way, teams who played each other in the qualifying round could not be drawn together.

Pot A	Pot B	Pot C	Pot D
Italy; Norway; Serbia; Portugal; England; Netherlands; Croatia	Russia; Turkey; Ukraine; Switzerland; Hungary; Germany; Scotland	Belgium; Czech Republic; Republic of Ireland; Spain; Denmark; Slovakia; Romania	Greece; Austria; Azerbaijan; Bosnia and Herzegovina; Northern Ireland; Poland; Montenegro

== See also ==
- 2010 UEFA European Under-19 Championship
