= Mattia Stefanelli =

Sammarinese footballer

Personal information
- Date of birth: 12 March 1993 (age 33)
- Place of birth: City of San Marino, San Marino
- Height: 1.89 m (6 ft 2 in)
- Position: Forward

Youth career
- Juvenes–Dogana
- 2009–2010: Cesena

Senior career*
Years	Team	Apps	(Gls)
2010–2012	Cesena	0	(0)
2010–2011	→ Verucchio (loan)	28	(14)
2012–2014	Crotone	0	(0)
2012–2013	→ San Marino (loan)	0	(0)
2013–2014	→ Juvenes–Dogana (loan)		
2014–2016	San Marino		
2016–2017	Novafeltria		(16)
2017	Fiorita	0	(0)
2017–2019	Novafeltria		
2019–2023	Pennarossa	63	(42)
2023–2025	Fiorentino	21	(6)

International career^{‡}
2008–2009	San Marino U17	6	(0)
2009–2010	San Marino U19	6	(1)
2010–2011	San Marino U21	5	(0)
2014–2023	San Marino	19	(1)
- * Club domestic league appearances and goals as of 5 June 2026 ‡ National team caps and goals as of 10 September 2023

Mattia Stefanelli (born 12 March 1993) is a Sammarinese footballer who last played for Fiorentino and was capped 19 times by the San Marino national team. He scored San Marino's first away goal in the World Cup UEFA qualification competition since 2001.

== Biography ==
Stefanelli is a youth product of Romagna club Cesena. Stefanelli left for Verucchio of Eccellenza Emilia–Romagna in 2010–11 season. He was a player for Cesena reserve in the whole 2011–12 season, despite he missed the rest of season in January 2012. In June 2012 he was signed by Crotone in co-ownership deal for €300,000, despite Cesena would only receive half of the registration rights of Fabrizio Bramati "worth" €300,000. Stefanelli joined the pre-season camp of Romagna club Forlì in July 2012, along with Cesena players Leonardo Arrigoni and Mattia Filippi. However, due to the injury Forlì did not sign Stefanelli, instead signed Daniele Ferri who owned by Cesena and Brescia. Stefanelli was signed by San Marino Calcio on 31 August 2012, a Sammarinese club in Italian football leagues. Stefanelli did not play any game either. On 20 June 2013 the co-ownership of Stefanelli and Bramati were renewed.

In summer 2013 Stefanelli joined Juvenes–Dogana. In June 2014 Cesena gave up the remain 50% registration rights.

On 12 July 2014 he was re-signed by San Marino.

In July 2019, Stefanelli joined S.S. Pennarossa.

=== International career ===
For U19, Stefanelli played all 3 games of 2011 UEFA European Under-19 Championship qualification. as well as in 2010 edition.

Stefanelli made his competitive San Marino U21 debut on 3 September 2010, the last match of 2011 UEFA European Under-21 Championship qualification. He also played first 4 games of 2013 UEFA European Under-21 Football Championship qualification Stefanelli did not participated in any matches of 2015 UEFA European Under-21 Football Championship qualification.

==== Senior team ====
Stefanelli played 5 times in UEFA Euro 2016 qualifying. On 12 October 2016, Stefanelli scored his first goal for San Marino in the World Cup qualification competition against Norway.

==== International goals ====
Scores and results list San Marino's goal tally first.

No	Date	Venue	Opponent	Score	Result	Competition
1.	11 October 2016	Ullevaal Stadion, Oslo, Norway	Norway	1–1	1–4	2018 FIFA World Cup qualification

== Personal life ==
Stefanelli worked as a director general while also playing football.
