= Jacques Lemans Arena =

Football stadium in Sankt Veit an der Glan, England

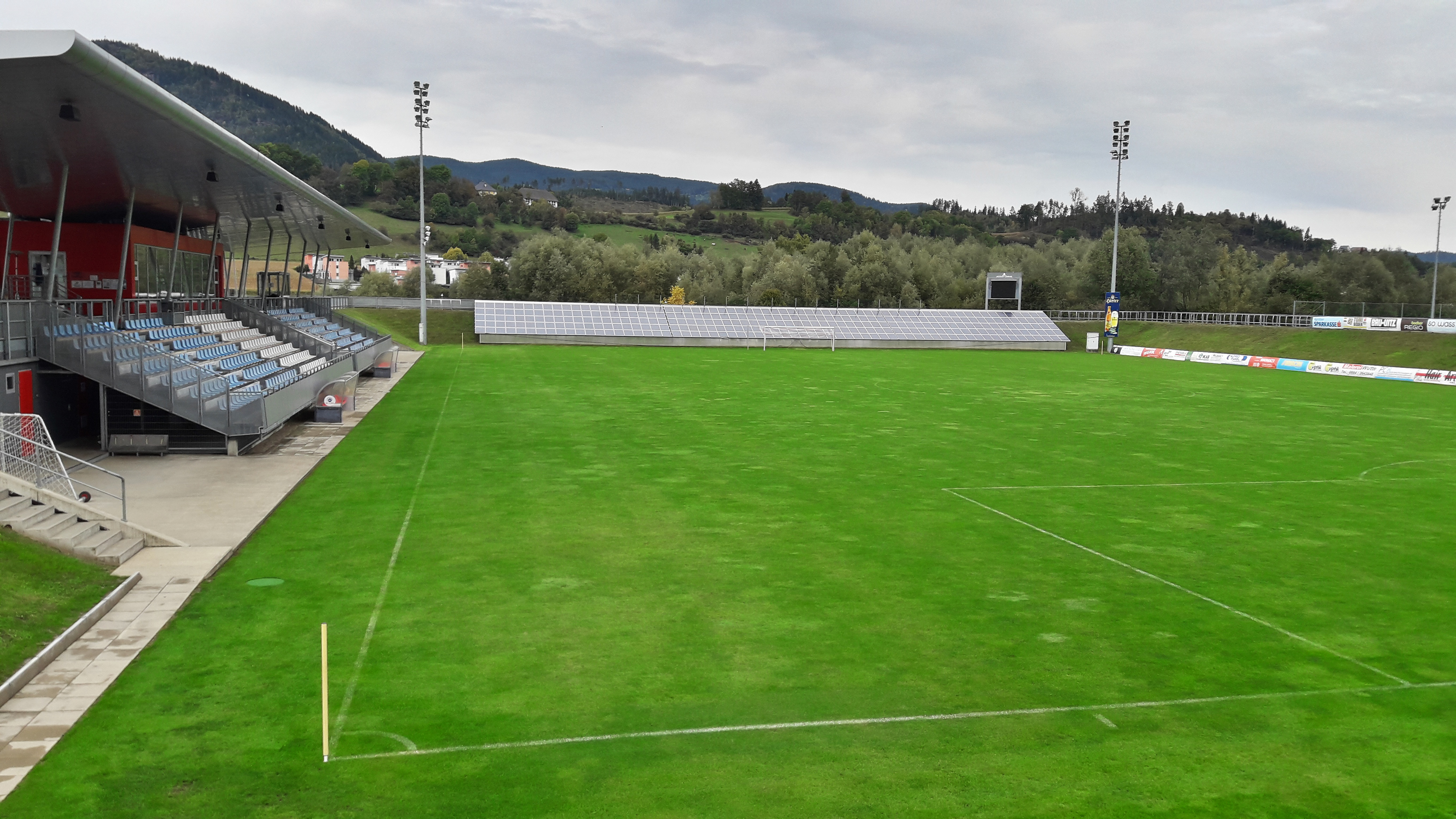
- Interactive map of Jacques Lemans Arena
- Location: Sankt Veit an der Glan, Carinthia, Austria
- Coordinates: 46.751005°N 14.337539°E
- Capacity: 2,420
- Surface: Grass

Construction
- Opened: 2005

Tenant
- FC St. Veit

The Jacques Lemans Arena is a football stadium in Sankt Veit an der Glan, in the southern Austrian state of Carinthia. The stadium holds 2,420 spectators and was built in 2005.

The stadium is named for Jacques Lemans GmbH, an international watch and jewelry company with headquarters at Sankt Veit an der Glan.

The stadium was opened in 2005 and is the home stadium of FC St. Veit, which play in the Regionalliga Mitte. The first match was played on 28 June, 2005, a friendly match between FC St. Veit and FC Kärnten.

The stadium grandstand offers more than 600 covered seats and 1,800 standing places. In addition to the stadium with the main pitch, the facility also includes three training fields, including an artificial turf and a goalkeeper training field.

The arena has been used several times as a venue for international football matches (mostly friendly matches) for European football teams that were at training camps in Carinthia. It has also hosted some matches of Austrian national teams.

== Notable matches ==
=== National ===
2006 UEFA U-19 Elite round matches

- 27 May 2006 – Slovenia and Austria which ended 1–2.
- 29 May 2006 – Russia and Austria which ended 0–1.
- 31 May 2006 – Austria and Hungary which ended 1–0.

Friendly matches

- 5 June 2010 – Romania 3–0 Honduras (2010 FIFA World Cup preparatory match)
- 7 April 2013 – Austria women vs Italy, which ended 1–3. (EURO 2013 preparatory match).
- 4 August 2016 – Austria women's U17 lost 0–1 to Slovenia.
- 10 May 2017 – Austria women's U19 won 1–0 against Slovenia.
- 14 May 2019 – Colombia U20 3–1 Mexico. (2019 U-20 World Cup preparatory match).
- 13 October 2020 – Friendly match between Nigeria and Tunisia, which ended 1–1.

=== International club matches ===
- 3 July 2006 – Friendly match between Austria Vienna and FC Köln finished 4–2.
- 16 July 2013 – Friendly between Hamburger SV and Anderlecht, which ended 3–1.
- 9 July 2018 – Friendly match: Vitesse 1–4 Shakhtar Donetsk.

== Stadium and external links ==
- Jacques Lemans Arena – St. Veit an der Glan at Europlan-online.de (in German)
- Bildergalerie at Stadionwelt.de (in German)
- Jacques Lemans Arena at Soccerway.
