= Michele Cevoli =

Sammarinese footballer

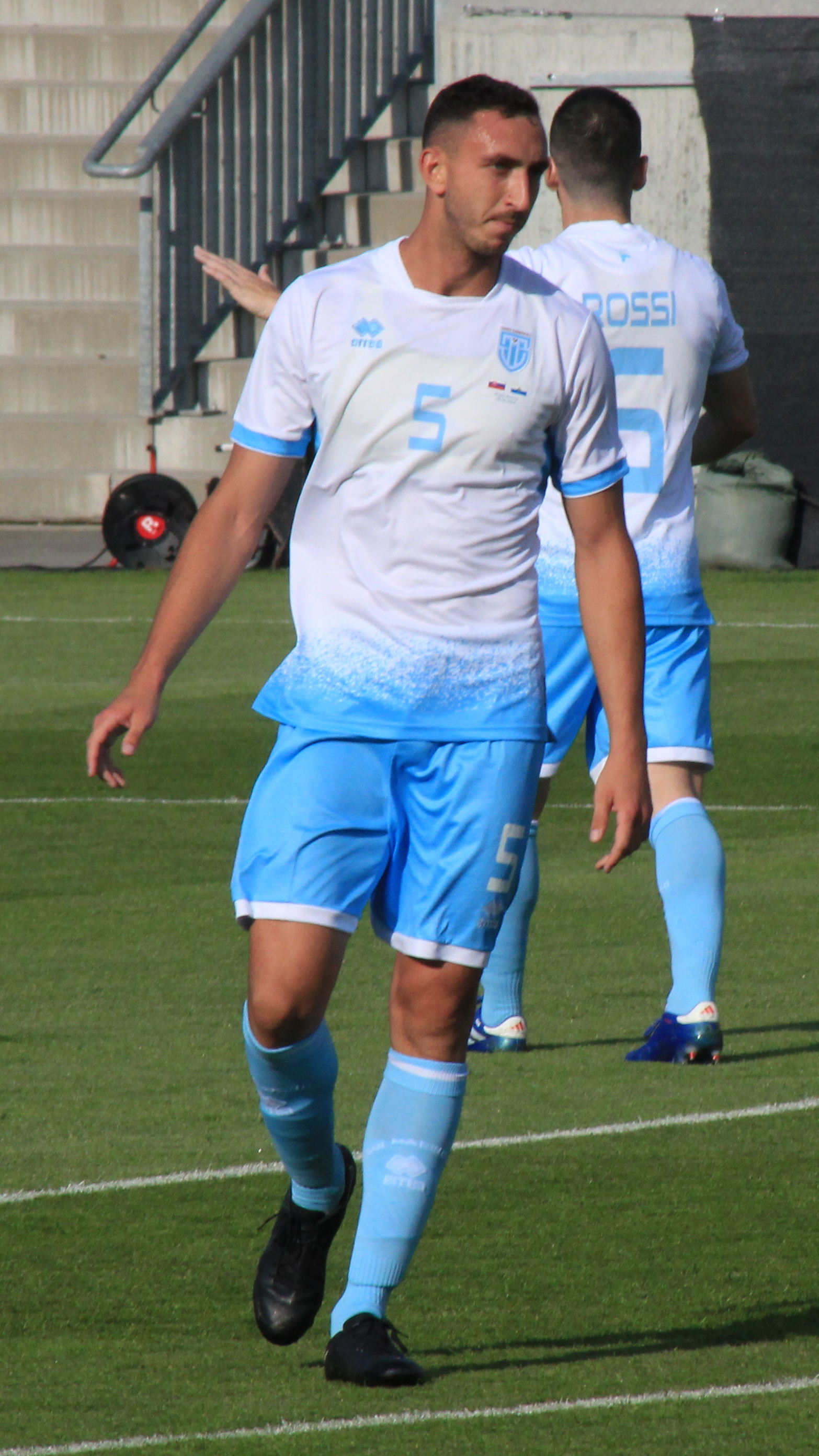
- Cevoli with San Marino against Slovakia (2024)

Personal information
- Full name: Michele Cevoli
- Date of birth: 22 July 1998 (age 28)
- Place of birth: San Marino
- Height: 1.94 m (6 ft 4 in)
- Position: Defender

Team information
- Current team: Tropical Coriano

Youth career
- San Marino

Senior career*
Years	Team	Apps	(Gls)
2016–2019	San Marino	32	(0)
2016–2017	→ ASD Savignanese (loan)		
2019–2020	Cattolica	0	(0)
2020	Pennarossa	4	(0)
2020–2025	Juvenes/Dogana	103	(5)
2025–2026	Pietracuta		
2026–	Tropical Coriano	5	(0)

International career^{‡}
2014	San Marino U-17	2	(0)
2016–	San Marino U-21	1	(0)
2017–	San Marino	44	(0)
- * Club domestic league appearances and goals as of 5 November 2026 ‡ National team caps and goals as of 6 October 2026

Michele Cevoli (born 22 July 1998) is a Sammarinese football player who plays as a defender for Tropical Coriano.

== Career ==
He begins with the Under-21 national team on September 1, 2016 in the 2017 European Cup qualifier against Spain (0-6). In a 9–0 defeat to Russia, Cevoli scored two own goals in the first half.

Cevoli re-joined Cattolica ahead of the 2019–20 season, but moved on to S.S. Pennarossa in January 2020.

== Personal life ==
Cevoli has a full-time job while also playing football. He also became an instructor for sporting activities aimed at health and fitness and specialized in biomechanics.
