= Fabrizio Bramati =

Italian footballer

Personal information
- Full name: Fabrizio Massimo Bramati
- Date of birth: 12 June 1993 (age 33)
- Place of birth: Rome, Italy
- Height: 1.84 m (6 ft 0 in)
- Position: Midfielder

Team information
- Current team: Barletta
- Number: 5

Youth career
- –2009: Lazio
- 2008–2009: → Siena (loan)
- 2009–2010: Isola Liri
- 2010: Grosseto

Senior career*
Years	Team	Apps	(Gls)
2010–2011	Guidonia Montecelio	2	(0)
2011–2012	Crotone	0	(0)
2012–2015	Cesena	0	(0)
2013	→ Savona (loan)	1	(0)
2013–2014	→ Chieti (loan)	0	(0)
2014	→ Bellaria–Igea (loan)	14	(0)
2014–2015	→ Savona (loan)	11	(0)
2015–2017	Messina	11	(0)
2017	→ Akragas (loan)	12	(0)
2017–2018	Akragas	15	(0)
2018–2019	Senglea Athletic	7	(0)
2019–2021	Paganese	39	(0)
2021–2022	FC Messina	9	(0)
2022	Unipomezia	16	(0)
2022	Grosseto	10	(0)
2023	Lavello	13	(0)
2023–	Barletta	1	(0)
- * Club domestic league appearances and goals as of 8 October 2023

Fabrizio Massimo Bramati (born 12 June 1993) is an Italian footballer who plays for Serie D club Barletta.

== Biography ==
Bramati started his football career in Lazio region. He was a player for Isola Liri under-17 team in 2009–10 season and Lazio under-15 team in 2007–08 season. In 2008–09 season Bramati left for Siena's under-16–17 team, a Tuscan team.

He was signed by Tuscan team Grosseto in summer 2010, after he was released by Isola Liri on 16 July 2010; However, he was released again ca. summer 2010. Bramati became a player of amateur team A.C.D. Guidonia Montecelio. Bramati played twice for the Lazio-based team in 2010–11 Serie D, on 19 December and 5 January.

On 19 January 2011 Bramati was signed by Crotone in temporary deal. In August 2011 Crotone signed him outright. He spent the whole Crotone career with the reserve team.

=== Cesena ===
In June 2012 half of the registration rights of Bramati was exchanged with half of the "card" of Mattia Stefanelli of Cesena. Both 50% rights were tagged for €300,000. In 2011–12 financial year Cesena had a player selling profit of €18,694,666, despite almost half of them came from player swap in June 2012. (Profits: Rossini €2.9M; Ferri €2.4M; Del Pivo €2M; Stefanelli €600,000) Bramati signed a 3-year contract. He failed to play any game in the first half of 2012–13 Serie B. He was too old for the reserve (league committee lowered the age limit) nor able to break into the first team. On 5 January 2013 Bramati left for Savona. Bramati played his only match on 12 May, the last competitive game of the season. In June 2013 the co-ownership deals were renewed.

On 2 September Bramati joined Chieti. On 4 January 2014 Bramati completed the transfer to Associazione Calcio Bellaria – Igea Marina, rejoining Cesena teammate Del Pivo.

=== Savona ===
On 8 August 2014 he was signed by Savona.

=== Paganese ===
On 2 August 2019 he signed with Paganese.
