= Gevorg Badalyan =

Armenian professional footballer

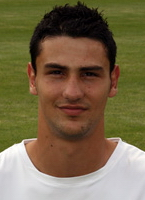

Personal information
- Full name: Gevorg Badalyan
- Date of birth: 5 January 1991 (age 35)
- Place of birth: Yerevan, Armenia
- Height: 1.88 m (6 ft 2 in)
- Position: Striker

Team information
- Current team: TJ Unie Hlubina

Youth career
- 2008–2010: Baník Most

Senior career*
Years	Team	Apps	(Gls)
2007	Patani	19	(4)
2008	Banants-2	14	(4)
2010–2011	Baník Most	17	(4)
2011–2013	Baník Ostrava	7	(0)
2013	Hlučín		
2013–2014	Sandecja Nowy Sącz	9	(1)
2014	Partizán Bardejov	10	(1)
2014–2016	Hlučín	57	(13)
2017–2019	Union Neuhofen	53	(32)
2019–2020	SV Karlstetten Neidling		
2020–2021	SVU Mauer-Öhling		
2021–2022	Union Hofstetten-Grünau		
2022	SV Pöchlarn-Golling		
2022–2023	SV Pram		
2023–	TJ Unie Hlubina		

International career
2007	Armenia U17	3	(0)
2009	Armenia U19	3	(1)
2009–2011	Armenia U21	8	(1)
- * Club domestic league appearances and goals as of 5 January 2024

Gevorg Badalyan (Armenian: Գեւորգ Բադալյան; born 5 January 1991) is an Armenian professional footballer who plays as a striker for Czech club TJ Unie Hlubina.
