= Ihor Zubko =

Ukrainian footballer

Personal information
- Full name: Ihor Albertovych Zubko
- Date of birth: 30 September 1991 (age 35)
- Place of birth: Simferopol, Ukraine
- Height: 1.70 m (5 ft 7 in)
- Position: Forward

Youth career
- 2004–2008: UOR Simferopol

Senior career*
Years	Team	Apps	(Gls)
2008–2013	FC Krymteplytsia Molodizhne	76	(5)
2012	→ PFC Nyva Ternopil (loan)	3	(1)
2013	FC Krystal Kherson	6	(2)
2014	FC Ocean Kerch		
2015	FC Anapa (amateur)		
2015–2016	FC TSK Simferopol	7	(0)
2016	FC Krymteplytsia Molodizhne	8	(0)
2017–2018	FC Ocean Kerch	51	(13)
2019	FC Kyzyltash Bakhchisaray	11	(2)
2019	FC Krymteplytsia Molodizhne	7	(0)

International career^{‡}
2010	Ukraine U19	7	(2)
- * Club domestic league appearances and goals as of 31 December 2019 ‡ National team caps and goals as of 20 December 2010

Ihor Zubko (Ukrainian: Ігор Альбертович Зубко; born 30 September 1991) is a Ukrainian football striker. In 2014, he acquired Russian citizenship as Igor Albertovich Zubko (Russian: Игорь Альбертович Зубко).

== International ==
In March 2010, Zubko was called up to the Ukraine national under-19 football team for a series of friendly matches against France in preparation for the 2010 UEFA European Under-19 Football Championship.
