= Pier Filippo Mazza =

Sammarinese footballer

Personal information
- Date of birth: 20 August 1988 (age 38)
- Position: Midfielder

Senior career*
Years	Team	Apps	(Gls)
2009–2012	Sant'Ermete Calcio		
2012–2013	A.C. Juvenes/Dogana	3	(0)
2013–2017	Sant'Ermete Calcio		
2017–2021	A.S.D. Sant'Ermete		

International career^{‡}
2010–2017	San Marino	17	(0)
- * Club domestic league appearances and goals as of 25 June 2022 ‡ National team caps and goals as of 18 July 2020

Pier Filippo Mazza (born 20 August 1988) is a Sammarinese footballer who last played for A.S.D. Sant'Ermete in Italy.

He has been capped by the San Marino national football team and made his international debut in 2010.
