= Alex Freitas (footballer, born 1991) =

Portuguese footballer

Alex
Personal information
- Full name: Alexandre Henrique Gonçalves de Freitas
- Date of birth: 27 August 1991 (age 35)
- Place of birth: Funchal, Portugal
- Height: 1.76 m (5 ft 9 in)
- Position: Winger

Team information
- Current team: Caçadores Taipas

Youth career
- 2001–2005: Nacional
- 2005–2010: Porto

Senior career*
| Years | Team | Apps | (Gls) |
| 2009–2010 | Porto | 0 | (0) |
| 2010–2013 | Santa Clara | 62 | (3) |
| 2013–2014 | Vitória Guimarães B | 27 | (5) |
| 2014–2017 | Vitória Guimarães | 29 | (4) |
| 2017 | → Moreirense (loan) | 14 | (2) |
| 2017–2018 | Salernitana | 9 | (0) |
| 2018 | → Pro Vercelli (loan) | 1 | (0) |
| 2018–2020 | Vitória Setúbal | 15 | (0) |
| 2020–2021 | Casa Pia | 10 | (1) |
| 2021 | Cova Piedade | 13 | (1) |
| 2021–2022 | Torreense | 19 | (0) |
| 2023–2024 | Dumiense | 19 | (0) |
| 2024 | Berço | 5 | (1) |
| 2024– | Caçadores Taipas | 19 | (2) |

International career
| 2008–2009 | Portugal U18 | 9 | (0) |
| 2009–2010 | Portugal U19 | 17 | (4) |
| 2010–2011 | Portugal U20 | 16 | (2) |
Medal record
Men's football
Representing Portugal
FIFA U-20 World Cup
| Runner-up | 2011 Colombia |
- * Club domestic league appearances and goals as of 13:59, 18 September 2025 (UTC)

Alexandre Henrique Gonçalves de Freitas CvIH (born 27 August 1991), commonly known as Alex, is a Portuguese professional footballer who plays mainly as a left winger for Clube Caçadores das Taipas.

== Club career ==
=== Porto ===
Born in Funchal, Madeira, Alex started his career with local C.D. Nacional. In 2005, the 14-year-old signed for FC Porto and went on to complete his development with the Primeira Liga giants.

During his only season as a senior with the northerners, 2009–10, Alex was summoned to four games with the first team: on 17 October 2009, he played 20 minutes against Sertanense F.C. in the Taça de Portugal after coming on as a substitute for Mariano González in a 4–0 home win. He also remained on the bench in two Taça da Liga matches and the 2–1 group-stage home victory over APOEL FC in the UEFA Champions League.

=== Santa Clara ===
In the summer of 2010, Alex signed with C.D. Santa Clara of the Segunda Liga. He appeared in 26 games (19 starts) in his first year with the Azores club.

Alex scored his first goal for the team on 22 October 2011, through a penalty and also providing an assist in a 2–1 home defeat of U.D. Oliveirense. He repeated the feat the following weekend and in the same fashion, helping the visitors draw 2–2 at C.D. Aves.

=== Guimarães ===
On 3 July 2013, Alex joined Vitória S.C. on a four-year contract. He was initially assigned to their reserves in the third division.

Alex managed to find the net in his Portuguese top flight debut on 4 April 2014, but in a 1–3 home loss to G.D. Estoril Praia. On 31 January 2017, having been rarely played over the course of his third and fourth seasons, he was loaned to Moreirense F.C. in the same league until June. He scored twice during his short spell – including once in a 3–1 home win against Porto – helping to a narrow escape from relegation.

=== Salernitana ===
In the 2017 off-season, Alex moved abroad for the first time and signed with US Salernitana 1919 from the Italian Serie B. In the following transfer window, he was loaned to fellow second-tier FC Pro Vercelli 1892.

== International career ==
In 2009, Alex was part of the Portugal under-19 side that failed to make the 2009 UEFA European Championship. As the country qualified for the next edition in France, he contributed four goals in six matches and was picked for the final squad in an eventual group-stage exit.

Alex was selected for Portugal's squad at the 2011 FIFA U-20 World Cup. He played all the games but one in Colombia en route to the second place, scoring in the 3–2 final defeat against Brazil.

== Honours ==
Porto

- Taça de Portugal: 2009–10

Portugal U20

- FIFA U-20 World Cup runner-up: 2011

Orders

- Knight of the Order of Prince Henry
