= Cristian Brolli =

Sammarinese footballer

Personal information
- Date of birth: 28 February 1992 (age 34)
- Place of birth: San Marino
- Position: Defender

Team information
- Current team: S.S. Folgore Falciano Calcio
- Number: 28

Senior career*
Years	Team	Apps	(Gls)
2010–2011	San Marino Calcio	0	(0)
2011–2012	Folgore	0	(0)
2012–2014	Cattolica Calcio	0	(0)
2014–2016	Sammaurese	3	(0)
2016–	Folgore	183	(4)

International career^{‡}
2011	San Marino U19		
2011–2013	San Marino U21	8	(0)
2012–2021	San Marino	24	(0)
- * Club domestic league appearances and goals as of 5 June 2026 ‡ National team caps and goals as of 10 October 2021

Cristian Brolli (born 28 February 1992) is a San Marino international footballer who plays as a defender for SS Folgore.

== Club career ==
As of 2021, he was in his second spell of playing domestic football in San Marino for S.S. Folgore Falciano Calcio.

== International career ==
Brolli has played eight games for the San Marino under-21 side, all of which ended in defeat. He has previously represented the San Marino under-19's, and scored an own goal for Italy in a Euro 2010 (under-19) qualification game at the Stadio Olimpico on 15 November 2009; the team managed to keep a clean sheet until 71 minutes, at which point Brolli's own goal led to a 4–0 loss.

Brolli made his senior debut from the bench on 14 August 2012, in a 3–2 home defeat to Malta. He made his first start on 11 September 2012, in a 6–0 home loss to Montenegro in qualification for the 2014 FIFA World Cup.

In San Marino's home Euro qualifier against England on 5 September 2015, Brolli scored a headed own goal in the first-half as the Three Lions went on to win 6–0.

He scored another own goal for his country against Belgium on 10 October 2019 in a UEFA European Championships qualification match which Belgium went on to win 9–0 to seal their qualification for Euro 2020.

Brolli then again for the third time scored an own goal, this time in a friendly game against Latvia on 11 November, 2020. The Sammarinese side were defeated by 3–0.

On 9 October 2021, he scored his fourth own goal in a 0–5 defeat against Poland at the Stadion Narodowy in Warsaw.

== Personal life ==
Brolli works in a furniture company while also playing football.

== Career statistics ==
=== Club ===
Appearances and goals by club, season and competition
Club	Season	League	National cup	Europe	Other	Total
