= Cattolica Calcio 1923 SG =

Italian football club

Cattolica Calcio 1923 S.G.
- Full name: Cattolica Calcio San Giovanni 1923
- Nickname(s): Giallorosso
- Founded: 1923; 1957 (re-founded); 2020 (re-founded)
- Ground: Stadio Giorgio Calbi, Cattolica, Italy
- Capacity: 2,250
- Chairman: Cesare Pietraccini
- Manager: Attilio Bardi
- League: Promozione Marche
- 2023–23: 18th (relegated from Eccellenza Marche)
Home colours	Away colours

Cattolica Calcio 1923 S.G. is an Italian association football club located in Cattolica, Emilia-Romagna. It currently plays in the Serie D. Its colors are red and yellow.

== History ==
The club was founded in 1923 as Associazione Calcio Cattolica.

Between 1980 and 1985 they played in Serie C2.

In July 2019, A.C. Cattolica Calcio merged with the previous owners of San Marino Calcio and were renamed as Cattolica Calcio San Marino. Despite playing in Cattolica, the club retained their headquarters in San Marino until 2020.

In the 2020, SSD Marignanese (a club from San Giovanni in Marignano, a town a few kilometers from Cattolica) moved their Serie D matches to the Giorgio Calbi Municipal Stadium in Cattolica and adopted the yellow and red team colors and a new logo recalling the denomination Marignanese-Cattolica. Subsequently, in the 2021 the club was relegated to Eccellenza, changed its name to Cattolica Calcio 1923 S.G. becoming to all intents and purposes the team heir to the football tradition of the city. Following Manzanese's withdrawal from the league, the Giallorossi stayed in Serie D.
