= 2020–21 Serbian Cup =

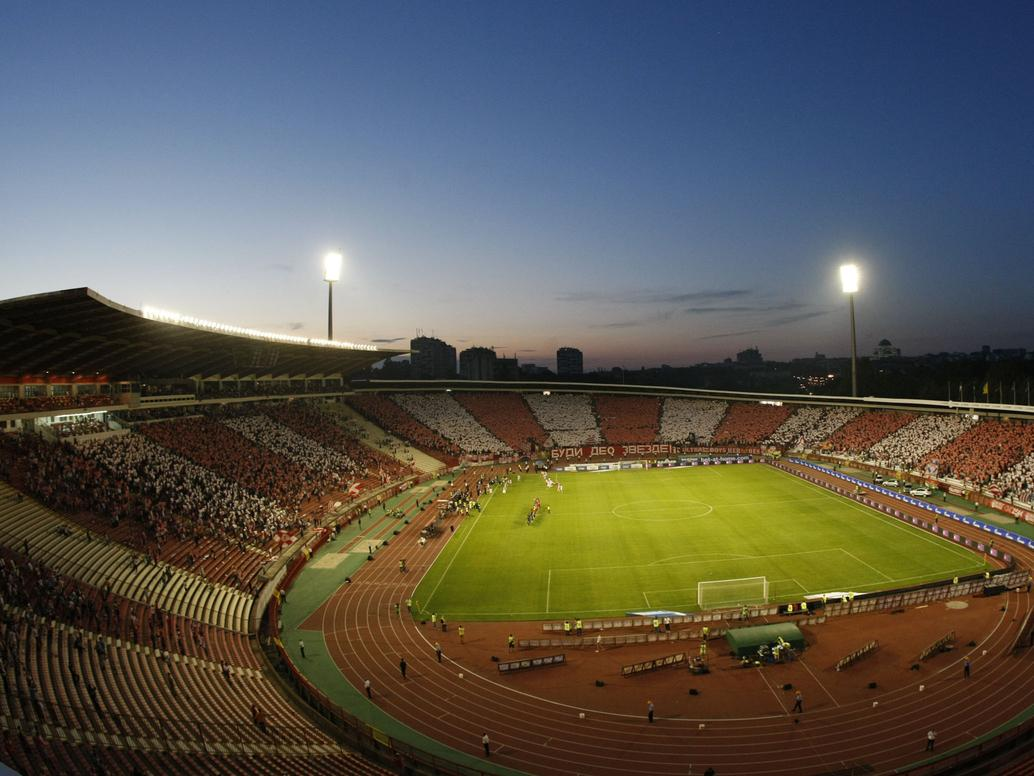
- Stadium Rajko Mitić hosted the final

Tournament details
- Country: Serbia
- Teams: 37

Final positions
- Champions: Red Star
- Runners-up: Partizan

Tournament statistics
- Matches played: 36
- Goals scored: 105 (2.92 per match)
- Top goal scorer(s): Nikola Terzić (4 goals)

The 2020–21 Serbian Cup season is the fifteenth season of the Serbian national football cup competition. It started on 9 September 2020, and will end on 25 May 2021. Red Star were crowned the champions after winning the final on penalties against Partizan. This was the second consecutive time that Partizan ended up as runners-up, both times losing in the final following a penalty shootout.

== Calendar ==
| Round | Date(s) | Number of fixtures | Clubs | New entries this round |
|---|---|---|---|---|
| Preliminary round | 9 September 2020 | 5 | 37 → 32 | 10 |
| Round of 32 | 21 October 2020 | 16 | 32 → 16 | 27 |
| Round of 16 | 25 November 2020 | 8 | 16 → 8 | none |
| Quarter-finals | 10 March 2021 | 4 | 8 → 4 | none |
| Semi-finals | 21 April 2021 | 2 | 4 → 2 | none |
| Final | 25 May 2021 | 1 | 2 → 1 | none |

== Preliminary round ==
A preliminary round was held in order to reduce the number of teams competing in the first round to 32. It consisted of 5 single-legged ties, with a penalty shoot-out as the decider if the score was tied after 90 minutes.

| 9 September 2020 | Sloga Majdevo | 0–10 | Trayal | Kruševac, Serbia |
| 16:00 | | Report | Joof 7'; Jovanović 13', 40', 60'; Jovković 38', 55'; Gogić 50'; Nikolić 53', 87'; Golubović 82' | Stadium: Mladost Stadium; Attendance: 0 (Note: Match was played behind closed doors due to the COVID-19 pandemic in Europe); Referee: Milan Ilić |

| 9 September 2020 | Mokra Gora | 1–1 (3–5 p) | Smederevo 1924 | Zubin Potok, Kosovo |
| 16:00 | Milojević 7' | Report | Đurđević 87' (pen.) | Stadium: Stadion Mala Marakana; Attendance: 0 Referee: Pavle Ilić |

| 9 September 2020 | Sušica | 2–0 | Sinđelić Beograd | Kragujevac, Serbia |
| 16:00 | Đurđević 85' (pen.); Krstić 93' | Report | | Stadium: FK Sušica Stadium; Attendance: 0 Referee: Miloš Milanović |

| 9 September 2020 | Jedinstvo | 4–1 | Zemun | Rumenka, Serbia |
| 16:00 | Gadžić 1', 7'; Trišić 24'; Mijailović 52' (o.g.) | Report | Crnomut 40' | Stadium: FK Jedinstvo Stadium; Attendance: 0 Referee: Dušan Pančić |

| 9 September 2020 | IMT | 2–0 | Budućnost Dobanovci | Belgrade, Serbia |
| 16:00 | Lukić 37'; Terzić 59' | Report | | Stadium: Stadion FK IMT; Attendance: 0 Referee: Ivan Stamenković |

== Round of 32 ==
Draw for the first round took place on 2 October 2020. Matches were played on 20 October and 21 October 2020, with exception of match including Red Star and Zlatibor which was played on 16 November due to Red Star's European fixtures.

| 20 October 2020 | Napredak Kruševac | 2–1 | Žarkovo | Kruševac, Serbia |
| 14:30 | Kočić 58'; Milošev 82' | Report | Dišić 6' | Stadium: Mladost Stadium; Attendance: 0 Referee: Bojan Nikolić |

| 21 October 2020 | Voždovac | 2–2 (4–2 p) | Grafičar Beograd | Belgrade, Serbia |
| 14:30 | Stoisavljević 65'; Vujnović 90+2' | Report | Stanković 10'; Lukić 30' | Stadium: Shopping Center Stadium; Attendance: 0 |

| 21 October 2020 | Smederevo 1924 | 1–2 | Radnički Niš | Smederevo, Serbia |
| 14:30 | Bačanin 83' | Report | Petrović 16'; Kovačević 40' | Stadium: Smederevo Stadium; Attendance: 0 Referee: Milan Ilić |

| 21 October 2020 | Jedinstvo Rumenka | 0–2 | Vojvodina | Rumenka, Serbia |
| 14:30 | | Report | Đekić 60' (o.g.); Čović 71' (pen.) | Stadium: FK Jedinstvo Rumenka Stadium; Attendance: 0 Referee: Nikola Petrović |

| 21 October 2020 | Javor | 2–1 | Radnički 1923 | Ivanjica, Serbia |
| 18:00 | Luković 7', 17' | Report | Ćirović 71' | Stadium: Ivanjica Stadium; Attendance: 0 Referee: Stanko Ostraćanin |

| 21 October 2020 | Sušica | 0–2 | Spartak Subotica | Kragujevac, Serbia |
| 14:30 | | Report | Vidović 57'; Tufegdžić 74' | Stadium: FK Sušica Stadium; Attendance: 0 Referee: Aleksandar Živković |

| 21 October 2020 | Mačva Šabac | 1–2 | Metalac Gornji Milanovac | Šabac, Serbia |
| 14:00 | Obrovac 57' (pen.) | Report | Milisavljević 50'; Arambašić 77' | Stadium: FK Mačva Stadium; Attendance: 0 Referee: Petar Piper |

| 21 October 2020 | Novi Pazar | 1–3 | Čukarički | Novi Pazar, Serbia |
| 14:30 | Kecap 37' | Report | Vidosavljević 43'; Kovač 48'; Birmančević 51' (pen.) | Stadium: Novi Pazar Stadium; Attendance: 0 Referee: Miloš Milanović |

| 21 October 2020 | Kabel | 3–4 | Radnik Surdulica | Novi Sad, Serbia |
| 14:30 | Novaković 1', 29'; Mesarović 38' | Report | Pavlov 42' (pen.), 68'; Spasić 51'; Jokić 79' | Stadium: FK Kabel Stadium; Attendance: 0 Referee: Pavle Tomić |

| 21 October 2020 | Rad | 0–0 (5–3 p) | Kolubara | Belgrade, Serbia |
| 14:30 | | Report | | Stadium: King Peter I Stadium; Attendance: 0 Referee: Đorđe Maksimović |

| 21 October 2020 | Trayal | 0–2 | TSC | Kruševac, Serbia |
| 14:30 | | Report | Lukić 80'; Zec 90+2' | Stadium: Mladost Stadium; Attendance: 0 Referee: Zoran Široki |

| 21 October 2020 | Mladost Lučani | 3–0 | Dinamo Vranje | Lučani, Serbia |
| 14:30 | Kos 3'; Selenić 37'; Odita 85' | Report | | Stadium: FK Mladost Lučani Stadium; Attendance: 0 Referee: Novica Anđelovski |

| 21 October 2020 | Partizan | 2–0 | OFK Bačka | Belgrade, Serbia |
| 16:00 | Pavlović 7'; Asano 75' | Report | | Stadium: FK Partizan Stadium; Attendance: 0 Referee: Nenad Minaković |

| 21 October 2020 | IMT | 2–1 | Inđija | Belgrade, Serbia |
| 14:30 | Terzić 39', 56' | Report | Aleksić 42' | Stadium: Stadion FK IMT; Attendance: 0 Referee: Milan Mitić |

| 21 October 2020 | Radnički Pirot | 0–2 | Proleter Novi Sad | Pirot, Serbia |
| 14:30 | | Report | Galić 49'; Gluščević 84' | Stadium: Stadion Dragan Nikolić; Attendance: 0 Referee: Danilo Jerinić |

| 16 November 2020 | Red Star | 4–2 | Zlatibor Čajetina | Belgrade, Serbia |
| | Ivanić 71'; Vukanović 73'; Pankov 84'; Radulović 86' | Report | Janjić 31'; Miloradović 56' | Stadium: Rajko Mitić Stadium; Attendance: 0 Referee: Petar Piper |

== Round of 16 ==
The 16 winners from first round took part in this stage of the competition. The draw was held on 17 November 2020, and it contained seeded and unseeded teams. The seeds were determined by last season's final standings in the Serbian top divisions. Matches were played on 25 and 26 November 2020, with exception of match including Rad and Red Star that was postponed to 18 December 2020 due to Red Star's European fixtures.

| 25 November 2020 | IMT | 2–1 | Radnički Niš | Belgrade, Serbia |
| 13:00 | Terzić 24'; Vukašinović 47' | Report | Đuričković 67' (pen.) | Stadium: Stadion FK IMT; Attendance: 0 Referee: Nenad Minaković |

| 25 November 2020 | Javor | 1–1 (1–4 p) | Voždovac | Ivanjica, Serbia |
| 13:30 | Nikolić 65' | Report | Stoisavljević 39' (pen.) | Stadium: Ivanjica Stadium; Attendance: 0 Referee: Novak Simović |

| 25 November 2020 | Spartak Subotica | 1–1 (5–3 p) | Mladost Lučani | Subotica, Serbia |
| 13:30 | Tufegdžić 22' | Report | Šatara 78' | Stadium: Subotica City Stadium; Attendance: 0 Referee: Danilo Grujić |

| 25 November 2020 | Radnik Surdulica | 2–2 (4–2 p) | Čukarički | Surdulica, Serbia |
| 13:30 | Danoski 53'; Pavlov 87' | Report | Birmančević 14'; Kajević 28' | Stadium: Surdulica City Stadium; Attendance: 0 Referee: Srđan Jovanović |

| 25 November 2020 | TSC | 2–0 | Napredak Kruševac | Senta, Serbia |
| 13:30 | Varga 17'; Balaž 76' | Report | | Stadium: Stadion Senta; Attendance: 0 Referee: Zoran Široki |

| 25 November 2020 | Metalac Gornji Milanovac | 0–1 | Partizan | Gornji Milanovac, Serbia |
| 16:00 | | Report | Asano 44' | Stadium: Stadion Metalac; Attendance: 0 Referee: Milan Mitić |

| 26 November 2020 | Proleter Novi Sad | 0–2 | Vojvodina | Novi Sad, Serbia |
| 16:00 | | Report | Čović 61'; Zukić 90+3' | Stadium: Karađorđe Stadium; Attendance: 0 Referee: Lazar Lukić |

| 18 December 2020 | Rad | 1–2 | Red Star | Belgrade, Serbia |
| 13:30 | Radunović 4' | Report | Spiridonović 17'; Krstović 60' | Stadium: King Peter I Stadium; Attendance: 0 |

== Quarter-finals ==
| 11 March 2021 | TSC | 1–1 (3–4 p) | Radnik Surdulica | Senta, Serbia |
| 12:55 | Lukić 18' (pen.) | Report | Makarić 37' | Stadium: Stadion Senta; Attendance: 0 Referee: Srđan Jovanović |

| 11 March 2021 | Spartak Subotica | 1–2 | Vojvodina | Subotica, Serbia |
| 15:00 | Shimura 61' | Report | Čović 58'; Bojić 69' | Stadium: Subotica City Stadium; Attendance: 0 Referee: Nenad Minaković |

| 11 March 2021 | Partizan | 4–0 | Voždovac | Belgrade, Serbia |
| 17:05 | Šćekić 24'; Vujačić 32'; Asano 52'; Natkho 58' | Report | | Stadium: Partizan Stadium; Attendance: 0 Referee: Novica Andjelovski |

| 30 March 2021 | Red Star | 3–0 | IMT | Belgrade, Serbia |
| 16:00 | Falcinelli 3'; Katai 11'; Falco 21' | Report | | Stadium: Rajko Mitić Stadium; Attendance: 0 |

== Semi-finals ==
| 21 April 2021 | Red Star | 2–1 | Radnik Surdulica | Belgrade, Serbia |
| 17:00 | Milunović 2'; Falcinelli 33' | Report | Makarić 51' | Stadium: Rajko Mitić Stadium; Attendance: 0 Referee: Miloš Đorđić |

| 21 April 2021 | Vojvodina | 0–1 | Partizan | Novi Sad, Serbia |
| 19:05 | | Report | Marković 11' | Stadium: Karađorđe Stadium; Attendance: 0 Referee: Srđan Jovanović |

== Final ==
25 May 2021
19:00 CEST (UTC+2)

| Red Star | 0–0 | Partizan |
|---|---|---|
| | Report |
Penalties
| Rodić (penalty scored); Pankov (penalty scored); Krstović (penalty scored); Nikolić (penalty scored) | 4–3 | Natcho (penalty scored); Živković (penalty scored); Stevanović (penalty scored); Jojić (penalty missed); Štulić (penalty missed) |

Rajko Mitić, Belgrade
Attendance: 0
Referee: Srđan Jovanović

| GK | 82 | (Canada) Milan Borjan |
| RB | 2 | (Serbia) Milan Gajić | (substituted off) 72' |
| CB | 19 | (Serbia) Nemanja Milunović |
| CB | 6 | (Serbia) Radovan Pankov |
| LB | 23 | (Serbia) Milan Rodić |
| DM | 35 | (Ivory Coast) Sékou Sanogo |
| RM | 31 | (Comoros) El Fardou Ben Nabouhane (yellow card) 61' | (substituted off) 100' |
| CM | 4 | (Montenegro) Mirko Ivanić | (substituted off) 91' |
| CM | 8 | (Gabon) Guélor Kanga | (substituted off) 66' |
| LM | 10 | (Serbia) Aleksandar Katai | (substituted off) 72' |
| CF | 16 | (Italy) Diego Falcinelli | (substituted off) 91' |
Substitutes:
| GK | 1 | (Serbia) Zoran Popović |
| DF | 5 | (Australia) Miloš Degenek | (substituted on) 91' |
| DF | 77 | (Serbia) Marko Gobeljić | (substituted on) 72' |
| MF | 20 | (Serbia) Njegoš Petrović |
| MF | 22 | (Serbia) Veljko Nikolić | (substituted on) 66' |
| MF | 24 | (Serbia) Željko Gavrić |
| MF | 55 | (Serbia) Slavoljub Srnić | (substituted on) 72' |
| FW | 92 | (Serbia) Aleksa Vukanović | (substituted on) 91' |
| FW | 99 | (Montenegro) Nikola Krstović | (substituted on) 100' |
Manager:
(Serbia) Dejan Stanković

| GK | 88 | (Serbia) Vladimir Stojković |
| RB | 26 | (Serbia) Aleksandar Miljković (yellow card) 85' |
| CB | 4 | (Serbia) Svetozar Marković | (substituted off) 46' |
| CB | 5 | (Montenegro) Igor Vujačić |
| LB | 72 | (Serbia) Slobodan Urošević | (substituted off) 111' |
| DM | 16 | (Serbia) Saša Zdjelar (yellow card) 84' | (substituted off) 106' |
| DM | 19 | (Montenegro) Aleksandar Šćekić |
| RM | 50 | (Serbia) Lazar Marković (yellow card) 60' | (substituted off) 72' |
| CM | 39 | (Serbia) Miloš Jojić |
| LM | 77 | (Serbia) Nemanja Jović | (substituted off) 72' |
| CF | 8 | (Hungary) Filip Holender | (substituted off) 87' |
Substitutes:
| GK | 41 | (Serbia) Aleksandar Popović |
| DF | 3 | (Cameroon) Macky Bagnack |
| DF | 6 | (Israel) Bibars Natcho | (substituted on) 72' |
| DF | 10 | (Serbia) Lazar Pavlović |
| MF | 14 | (Serbia) Samed Baždar |
| MF | 17 | (Serbia) Marko Živković | (substituted on) 111' |
| MF | 23 | (Serbia) Bojan Ostojić | (substituted on) 46' |
| MF | 32 | (Serbia) Nikola Štulić | (substituted on) 87' |
| MF | 80 | (Serbia) Filip Stevanović | (substituted on) 106' |
| MF | 97 | (Serbia) Aleksandar Lutovac | (substituted on) 72' |
| FW | 99 | (Serbia) Milan Smiljanić |
Manager:
(Serbia) Aleksandar Stanojević

== Top scorers ==
As of matches played on 11 March 2021.

| Rank | Player | Club | Goals |
|---|---|---|---|
| 1 | (Serbia) Nikola Terzić | IMT | 4 |
| 2 | (Serbia) Nemanja Čović | Vojvodina | 3 |
| 2 | (Serbia) Ivica Jovanović | Trayal | 3 |
| 2 | (Ukraine) Yevhen Pavlov | Radnik | 3 |
| 2 | (Japan) Takuma Asano | Partizan | 3 |
