= 2021–22 FK Partizan season =

FK Partizan
2021–22 season
- President: Milorad Vučelić
- Head coach: Aleksandar Stanojević
- Stadium: Partizan Stadium
- Serbian SuperLiga: 2nd
- Serbian Cup: Runners-up
- Conference League: Round of 16
- Top goalscorer: League: Ricardo Gomes (29); All: Ricardo Gomes (38)
Home colours
- All statistics correct as of 27 May 2022.

The 2021–22 season is Fudbalski Klub Partizan's 75th season in existence and the club's 16th competing in the Serbian SuperLiga.

== Transfers ==
=== In ===
| Date | Position | Name | From | Type | Ref. |
| 3 June 2021 | DF | (Bosnia and Herzegovina) Siniša Saničanin | (Serbia) Vojvodina | Free Transfer | |
| 17 June 2021 | MF | (Serbia) Danilo Pantić | (England) Chelsea | Free Transfer | |
| 28 June 2021 | FW | (Cape Verde) Ricardo Gomes | (United Arab Emirates) Sharjah FC | Free Transfer | |
| 1 July 2021 | FW | (Hungary) Filip Holender | (Switzerland) Lugano | Transfer | |
| 6 August 2021 | GK | (Serbia) Milan Lukač | (Turkey) Akhisarspor | Free Transfer | |
| 1 September 2021 | DF | (Serbia) Nemanja Miletić | (Saudi Arabia) Al-Raed S.FC | Free Transfer | |
| 2 September 2021 | FW | (Netherlands) Queensy Menig | (Netherlands) Twente | Transfer | |
| 2 September 2021 | FW | (Ghana) Isaac Opoku Agyemang | (Ghana) AshantiGold | Loan | |
| 27 January 2022 | MF | (Serbia) Ljubomir Fejsa | (Saudi Arabia) Al Ahli | Free Transfer | |
| 1 February 2022 | MF | (Serbia) Marko Jevtović | (Qatar) Al-Ahli SC | Free Transfer | |

=== Out ===
| Date | Position | Name | To | Type | Ref. |
|---|---|---|---|---|---|
| 11 June 2021 | FW | (Serbia) Slobodan Stanojlović | (Serbia) TSC | Free Transfer | |
| 17 June 2021 | FW | (Serbia) Dennis Stojković | (Italy) Torino | Free Transfer | |
| 19 June 2021 | MF | (Serbia) Nikola Čolić | (Serbia) Čukarički | Transfer | |
| 23 June 2021 | DF | (Serbia) Luka Cucin | (Serbia) Vojvodina | Free Transfer | |
| 24 June 2021 | MF | (Serbia) Miljan Momčilović | (Serbia) Novi Pazar | Loan | |
| 30 June 2021 | DF | (Montenegro) Periša Pešukić | (Montenegro) Iskra Danilovgrad | Free Transfer | |
| 30 June 2021 | FW | (Serbia) Savo Arambašić | (Serbia) Mačva Šabac | Free Transfer | |
| 1 July 2021 | FW | (Serbia) Filip Stevanović | (England) Manchester City | Loan return | |
| 1 July 2021 | DF | (Serbia) Svetozar Marković | (Greece) Olympiacos | Loan return | |
| 1 July 2021 | DF | (Serbia) Dušan Lalatović | (Serbia) Rad | Free Transfer | |
| 11 July 2021 | DF | (Cameroon) Macky Bagnack | (Kazakhstan) Kairat Almaty | Transfer | |
| 26 July 2021 | FW | (Serbia) Bojan Matić | (Uzbekistan) Pakhtakor Tashkent | Free Transfer | |
| 27 July 2021 | GK | (Serbia) Vladimir Stojković | (Saudi Arabia) Al Fayha FC | Free Transfer | |
| 17 September 2021 | FW | (Serbia) Petar Gigić | (Serbia) Mačva Šabac | Free Transfer | |
| 24 September 2021 | MF | (Guinea) Seydouba Soumah | Kuwait SC | Free Transfer | |
| 29 December 2021 | FW | (France) Jean-Christophe Bahebeck | (Bolivia) Atlético Palmaflor | Released | |
| 19 January 2022 | DF | (Serbia) Mateja Đorđević | (Serbia) Voždovac | Free Transfer | |
| 22 January 2022 | MF | (Montenegro) Aleksandar Šćekić | (Poland) KGHM Zagłębie Lubin | Free Transfer | |
| 25 January 2022 | FW | (Serbia) Nikola Štulić | (Serbia) Radnički Niš | Free Transfer | |

== Players ==
=== Squad ===
| No. | Name | Nationality | Position (s) | Date of birth (age) | Signed from | Notes |
Goalkeepers
| 1 | Đorđe Mihajlović | (Serbia) | GK | 20 April 2004 (age 22) | Youth system | |
| 25 | Milan Lukač | (Serbia) | GK | 4 October 1985 (age 40) | (Turkey) Akhisarspor | |
| 41 | Aleksandar Popović | (Serbia) | GK | 29 September 1999 (age 26) | Youth system | |
| 85 | Nemanja Stevanović | (Serbia) | GK | 8 May 1992 (age 34) | (Serbia) Čukarički | |
Defenders
| 4 | Siniša Saničanin | (Bosnia and Herzegovina) | CB | 24 April 1995 (age 31) | (Serbia) Vojvodina | |
| 5 | Igor Vujačić | (Montenegro) | CB | 8 August 1994 (age 32) | (Montenegro) Zeta | |
| 17 | Marko Živković | (Serbia) | RB | 17 May 1994 (age 32) | (Serbia) Voždovac | |
| 23 | Bojan Ostojić | (Serbia) | CB | 12 February 1984 (age 42) | (Serbia) Čukarički | Vice-captain |
| 26 | Aleksandar Miljković | (Serbia) | RB | 26 February 1990 (age 36) | (Armenia) Alashkert | |
| 29 | Mihajlo Ilić | (Serbia) | CB | 4 June 2003 (age 23) | Youth system | |
| 31 | Rajko Brežančić | (Serbia) | LB | 21 August 1989 (age 37) | (Spain) Málaga | |
| 37 | Ivan Obradović | (Serbia) | LB | 25 July 1988 (age 38) | (Poland) Legia Warsaw | |
| 72 | Slobodan Urošević | (Serbia) | LB | 15 April 1994 (age 32) | (Serbia) Napredak Kruševac | |
| 73 | Nemanja Miletić | (Serbia) | CB | 16 January 1991 (age 35) | (Saudi Arabia) Al-Raed S.FC | |
Midfielders
| 6 | Bibras Natkho | (Israel) | CM | 18 February 1988 (age 38) | (Greece) Olympiacos | |
| 10 | Lazar Pavlović | (Serbia) | AM | 2 November 2001 (age 24) | Youth system | |
| 15 | Ljubomir Fejsa | (Serbia) | DM | 14 August 1988 (age 38) | (Saudi Arabia) Al Ahli | |
| 16 | Saša Zdjelar | (Serbia) | DM | 20 March 1995 (age 31) | (Greece) Olympiacos | |
| 21 | Marko Jevtović | (Serbia) | DM | 24 July 1993 (age 33) | (Qatar) Al–Ahli SC | |
| 39 | Miloš Jojić | (Serbia) | CM | 19 March 1992 (age 34) | (Turkey) İstanbul Başakşehira | |
| 55 | Danilo Pantić | (Serbia) | MF | 26 October 1996 (age 29) | (England) Chelsea | |
| 99 | Milan Smiljanić | (Serbia) | DM | 19 November 1986 (age 39) | (Israel) Hapoel Ashkelon | Vice-captain |
Forwards
| 8 | Filip Holender | (Hungary) | LW / CF | 27 July 1994 (age 32) | (Switzerland) Lugano | |
| 9 | Queensy Menig | (Netherlands) | RW | 19 August 1995 (age 31) | (Netherlands) Twente | |
| 11 | Ricardo Gomes | (Cape Verde) | CF | 18 December 1991 (age 34) | (United Arab Emirates) Sharjah FC | |
| 14 | Samed Baždar | (Serbia) | CF | 31 January 2004 (age 22) | Youth system | |
| 33 | Marko Milovanović | (Serbia) | CF | 4 August 2003 (age 23) | Youth system | |
| 36 | Nikola Terzić | (Serbia) | RW | 28 September 2000 (age 25) | (Serbia) Čukarički | |
| 50 | Lazar Marković | (Serbia) | RW | 2 March 1994 (age 32) | (England) Fulham | |
| 51 | Vanja Vlahović | (Serbia) | LW | 23 March 2004 (age 22) | Youth system | |
| 77 | Nemanja Jović | (Serbia) | FW / LW | 8 August 2002 (age 24) | Youth system | |
| 87 | Nikola Lakčević | (Serbia) | FW / RW | 28 October 1999 (age 26) | (Serbia) OFK Beograd | |
| 90 | Mihajlo Petković | (Serbia) | LW | 27 May 2004 (age 22) | Youth system | |
| 97 | Aleksandar Lutovac | (Serbia) | RW / RB | 28 June 1997 (age 29) | (Serbia) Rad | |

== Friendlies ==
| 26 June 2021 Friendly | Partizan (Serbia) | 2–2 | (Slovenia) Mura | Murska Sobota, Slovenia |
| 18:00 | Jović 60', 85' | Report | Bobičanec 3'; Horvat 38' | Stadium: Fazanerija City Stadium; Attendance: 1,500; Referee: (Slovenia) Slavko Nemet |

| 30 June 2021 Friendly | Partizan (Serbia) | 3–0 | (Slovenia) Koper | Kidričevo, Slovenia |
| 19:00 | Milovanović 41', 57'; Pantić 78' | Report | | Stadium: Aluminij Sports Park; Attendance: 50; Referee: |

| 4 July 2021 Friendly | Partizan (Serbia) | 3–0 | (Poland) Cracovia | Gornja Radgona, Slovenia |
| 18:00 | Urošević 35'; Pantić 45'; Ostojić 59' | Report | | Stadium: Gornja Radgona City Stadium; Attendance: 50; Referee: |

| 8 July 2021 Friendly | Partizan (Serbia) | 1–0 | (Russia) Rostov | Gornja Radgona, Slovenia |
| 18:00 | Milovanović 67' | Report | | Stadium: Gornja Radgona City Stadium; Attendance: 100; Referee: |

| 17 August 2021 Friendly | Partizan (Serbia) | 1–0 | (Saudi Arabia) Al-Qadsiah FC | Belgrade, Serbia |
| 18:00 | Milovanović | | | Stadium: SC Partizan-Teleoptik; Referee: |

| 13 September 2021 Friendly | Partizan (Serbia) | 4–1 | (Serbia) Teleoptik | Belgrade, Serbia |
| | | Report | | Stadium: SC Partizan-Teleoptik; Referee: |

| 16 November 2021 Friendly | Zvezdara (Serbia) | 0–5 | (Serbia) Partizan | Belgrade, Serbia |
| 13:00 | | Report | Pavlović 19'; Urošević 40'; Vlahović 62'; Milovanović 67', 90' | Stadium: FK Zvezdara stadium Referee: (Serbia) Filip Marković |

| 25 January 2022 Friendly | Tikvesh (North Macedonia) | 1–2 | (Serbia) Partizan | Antalya, Turkey |
| 14:00 | Ivanovski 26' (pen.) | Report | Jojić 29'; Gomes 36' | Referee: |

| 29 January 2022 Friendly | İstanbul Başakşehir (Turkey) | 1–0 | (Serbia) Partizan | Antalya, Turkey |
| 15:00 | Epureanu 44' | Report | | Referee: |

| 2 February 2022 Friendly | Dynamo Moscow (Russia) | 2–1 | (Serbia) Partizan | Antalya, Turkey |
| 14:00 | Fomin 5'; Galkin 88' | Report | Natkho 65' | Referee: |

| 5 February 2022 Friendly | Dynamo Batumi (Georgia (country)) | 1–3 | (Serbia) Partizan | Antalya, Turkey |
| 15:00 | Mamuchashvili 5' | Report | Terzić 37'; Gomes 44'; Milovanović 84' | Referee: |

| 30 March 2022 Friendly | Dragačevo (Serbia) | 0–11 | (Serbia) Partizan | Guča, Serbia |
| 16:00 | | Report | | Attendance: Dragačevo City Stadium; Referee: |

== Competitions ==
=== Overview ===
| Competition | Record | | | | | | | |
| Competition | P | W | D | L | GF | GA | GD | Win % |
|---|---|---|---|---|---|---|---|---|
| Serbian SuperLiga | 37 | 31 | 5 | 1 | 85 | 13 | +72 | 83.78 |
| Serbian Cup | 5 | 4 | 0 | 1 | 9 | 3 | +6 | 80.00 |
| UEFA Europa Conference League | 16 | 7 | 4 | 5 | 21 | 18 | +3 | 43.75 |
| Total | 58 | 42 | 9 | 7 | 116 | 34 | +82 | 72.41 |

=== Serbian SuperLiga ===
==== Regular season ====
===== League table =====
| Pos | Team | Pld | W | D | L | GF | GA | GD | Pts | Qualification |
|---|---|---|---|---|---|---|---|---|---|---|
| 1 | Red Star Belgrade | 30 | 26 | 3 | 1 | 79 | 17 | +62 | 81 | Qualification for the Championship round |
| 2 | Partizan | 30 | 25 | 4 | 1 | 68 | 10 | +58 | 79 | Qualification for the Championship round |
| 3 | Čukarički | 30 | 14 | 12 | 4 | 48 | 27 | +21 | 54 | Qualification for the Championship round |
| 4 | TSC | 30 | 11 | 8 | 11 | 44 | 41 | +3 | 41 | Qualification for the Championship round |
| 5 | Radnički Niš | 30 | 9 | 13 | 8 | 32 | 33 | −1 | 40 | Qualification for the Championship round |

Source: SuperLiga (in Serbian)
Rules for classification: 1) Points; 2) Head-to-head points; 3) Head-to-head goal difference; 4) Head-to-head goals scored; 5) Head-to-head away goals scored (if two teams tied); 6) Goal difference; 7) Goals scored; 8) Fair play ranking; 9) Draw.

==== Results by matchday ====
| Round | 1 | 2 | 3 | 4 | 5 | 6 | 7 | 8 | 9 | 10 | 11 | 12 | 13 | 14 | 15 | 16 | 17 | 18 | 19 | 20 | 21 | 22 | 23 | 24 | 25 | 26 | 27 | 28 | 29 | 30 |
|---|---|---|---|---|---|---|---|---|---|---|---|---|---|---|---|---|---|---|---|---|---|---|---|---|---|---|---|---|---|---|
| Ground | A | A | H | A | H | A | H | A | H | A | H | A | H | A | H | H | H | A | H | A | H | A | H | A | H | A | H | A | H | A |
| Result | W | W | W | W | W | W | W | W | D | W | W | W | W | W | W | D | W | W | W | W | W | W | W | L | W | W | D | W | W | D |
| Position | 1 | 1 | 1 | 1 | 2 | 1 | 1 | 1 | 1 | 1 | 1 | 1 | 1 | 1 | 1 | 1 | 1 | 1 | 1 | 1 | 1 | 1 | 1 | 1 | 1 | 1 | 1 | 1 | 1 | 2 |

Updated to match(es) played on 10 April 2022. Source: Partizan
A = Away; H = Home; W = Win; D = Draw; L = Loss

=== Results ===
| 17 July 2021 1 | Proleter Novi Sad | 0–4 | Partizan | Novi Sad |
| 21:00 | Kojić (yellow card) 27'; Jovanović (yellow card) 86' | Report | Pantić (yellow card) 7'; Gomes 9', 12'; Urošević 22'; Jojić 28' | Stadium: Karađorđe Stadium; Referee: (Serbia) Aleksandar Živković |

| 25 July 2021 2 | Vojvodina | 0–2 | Partizan | Novi Sad |
| 21:00 | Bastajić (yellow card) 27' | Report | Natkho 4', 58'; Lutovac (yellow card) 68'; Urošević (yellow card) 72' | Stadium: Karađorđe Stadium; Referee: (Serbia) Novak Simović |

| 1 August 2021 3 | Partizan | 4–0 | Voždovac | Belgrade |
| 21:00 | Gomes 11'; Šćekić 22'; Holender 53'; Pantić 70' | Report | Milojević (yellow card) 80' | Stadium: Partizan Stadium; Attendance: 3,076; Referee: (Serbia) Milan Mitić |

| 8 August 2021 4 | Novi Pazar | 1–4 | Partizan | Novi Pazar |
| 21:00 | Delimeđac (yellow card) 45'; Mihailović 90+2' | Report | Natkho 42'; Urošević 49'; Gomes 61'; Soumah 77'; Smiljanić (yellow card) 87' | Stadium: Novi Pazar City Stadium; Referee: (Serbia) Miloš Milanović |

| 28 October 2021* 5 | Partizan | 3–1 | Metalac | Belgrade |
| 16:55 | Gomes 7'; Natkho 52' (pen.), 68'; Živković (yellow card) 56'; Zdjelar (yellow card) 78'; Šćekić (yellow card) 90+3' | Report | Stuparević 29'; Maslarević (yellow card) 51'; Antonijević (yellow card) 66'; Mlađović (yellow card) 82' | Stadium: Partizan Stadium; Attendance: 2,000; Referee: (Serbia) Lazar Lukić |

| 22 August 2021 6 | Kolubara | 0–4 | Partizan | Lazarevac |
| 21:00 | Đokić (yellow card) 17' | Report | Lutovac 11'; Terzić 43'; Gomes 52', 56' | Stadium: Stadion FK Kolubara; Attendance: 1,500; Referee: (Serbia) Lazar Lukić |

| 29 August 2021 7 | Partizan | 4–0 | Radnički Niš | Belgrade |
| 21:00 | Gomes 36', 43'; Natkho 63'; Jović 70'; Šćekić (yellow card) 76' | Report | Vujadinović (yellow card) 4'; Spasić (yellow card) 68' | Stadium: Partizan Stadium; Attendance: 3,000; Referee: (Serbia) Milan Mitić |

| 11 September 2021 8 | Radnički 1923 | 1–3 | Partizan | Kragujevac |
| 16:00 | Saničanin 8' (o.g.); Arsenijević (yellow card) 37'; Damjanac (yellow card) 42'; Mirić (yellow card) 45' | Report | Jojić 39'; Holender 45'; Gomes 48'; Šćekić (yellow card) 85' | Stadium: Čika Dača Stadium; Attendance: 7,000; Referee: (Serbia) Stanko Ostraćanin |

| 19 September 2021 9 | Partizan | 1–1 | Red Star Belgrade | Belgrade |
| 18:00 | Natkho 36'; Saničanin (yellow card) 45'; Zdjelar (yellow card) 88'; Urošević (yellow card) 90+5' | Report | Kanga (yellow card) 55'; Sanogo (yellow card) 76'; Katai 83'; Lazetić (yellow card) 88'; Diony (yellow card) 90+1' | Stadium: Partizan Stadium; Attendance: 16,074; Referee: (Serbia) Novak Simović |

| 23 September 2021 10 | Mladost Lučani | 0–2 | Partizan | Lučani |
| 17:50 | Baha (yellow card) 64' | Report | Gomes 3'; Obradović 38' | Stadium: Mladost Stadium; Attendance: 1,000; Referee: (Serbia) Aleksandar Živković |

| 26 September 2021 11 | Partizan | 5–0 | Spartak Subotica | Belgrade |
| 20:15 | Gomes 14', 64'; Terzić 45+1'; Menig 61'; Holender 90+1' | Report | Bogdanović (yellow card) 71' | Stadium: Partizan Stadium; Attendance: 5,000; Referee: (Serbia) Miloš Milanović |

| 3 October 2021 12 | Napredak Kruševac | 0–1 | Partizan | Kruševac |
| 16:00 | Ćuković (red card) 9'; Jovanović (yellow card) 12'; Tomić (yellow card) 73'; Marjanović (yellow card) 82' | Report | Gomes 12' (pen.) (yellow card) 71'; Urošević (yellow card) 41' (yellow-red card) 54'; Zdjelar (yellow card) 82' | Stadium: Mladost Stadium; Attendance: 5,000; Referee: (Serbia) Nenad Minaković |

| 17 October 2021 13 | Partizan | 2–0 | Radnik Surdulica | Belgrade |
| 17:00 | Jojić 33'; Gomes 73' | Report | | Stadium: Partizan Stadium; Referee: (Serbia) Đorđe Maksimović |

| 24 October 2021 14 | TSC | 1–3 | Partizan | Bačka Topola |
| 13:30 | Petković 9' (yellow card) 49' | Report | Gomes 12' (yellow card) 29'; Terzić 27', 36'; Vujačić (yellow card) 77' | Stadium: TSC Arena; Referee: (Serbia) Srđan Jovanović |

| 31 October 2021 15 | Partizan | 2–0 | Čukarički | Belgrade |
| 18:30 | Vujačić 33'; Živković 45+3' | Report | Kovačević (yellow card) 45+2'; N'Diaye (yellow card) 70' | Stadium: Partizan Stadium; Referee: (Serbia) Milan Stefanović |

| 7 November 2021 16 | Partizan | 0–0 | Proleter Novi Sad | Belgrade |
| 20:15 | Natkho (yellow card) 40'; Urošević (yellow card) 88' | Report | Tanasin (yellow card) 40'; Stojanović (yellow card) 41'; Vukasović (yellow card) 67'; Kun (yellow card) 79'; Mitrović (yellow card) 82' | Stadium: Partizan Stadium; Referee: (Serbia) Pavle Tomić |

| 21 November 2021 17 | Partizan | 4–1 | Vojvodina | Belgrade |
| 15:45 | Pantić 35'; Menig 42'; Gomes 69'; Jojić 72' (yellow card) 88' | Report | Simić 48'; Kopitović (yellow card) 49'; Devetak (yellow card) 52'; Kovačević (yellow card) 89' | Stadium: Partizan Stadium; Attendance: 4,000; Referee: (Serbia) Lazar Lukić |

| 28 November 2021 18 | Voždovac | 0–3 | Partizan | Belgrade |
| 16:30 | Ivezić (yellow card) 39' | Report | Jojić (yellow card) 32'; Menig 40'; Gomes 50'; Pantić 56' | Stadium: Voždovac Stadium; Attendance: 2,000; Referee: (Serbia) Aleksandar Živković |

| 5 December 2021 19 | Partizan | 2–0 | Novi Pazar | Belgrade |
| 15:45 | Milovanović 50'; Jović 59' (pen.) | Report | Pavišić (yellow card) 45+2'; Dimić (yellow card) 90+2' | Stadium: Partizan Stadium; Referee: (Serbia) Andrija Stojanović |

| 15 December 2021 20 | Metalac | 0–3 | Partizan | Gornji Milanovac |
| 15:00 | Antonijević (yellow card) 63'; Vlalukin (yellow card) 88' | Report | Menig 3', 37'; Šćekić 28'; Urošević (yellow card) 41' | Stadium: Stadion Metalac; Attendance: 500; Referee: (Serbia) Marko Ivković |

| 18 December 2021 21 | Partizan | 1–0 | Kolubara | Belgrade |
| 12:55 | Saničanin (yellow card) 44'; Menig 67'; Holender (yellow card) 87'; Jović (yellow card) 88' | Report | Lončar (yellow card) 25'; Dobrijević (yellow card) 41'; Đurić (yellow card) 51' | Stadium: Partizan Stadium; Referee: (Serbia) Nenad Minaković |

| 12 February 2022 22 | Radnički Niš | 0–2 | Partizan | Niš |
| 14:30 | Arsić (yellow card) 74'; Mesarović (yellow card) 78'; Pavlov (yellow card) 90' | Report | Gomes 44'; Zdjelar (yellow card) 45'; Vujačić (yellow card) 52'; Menig (yellow card) 58'; Urošević 85' | Stadium: Čair Stadium; Attendance: 4,000; Referee: (Serbia) Miloš Milanović |

| 20 February 2022 23 | Partizan | 2–0 | Radnički 1923 | Belgrade |
| 15:30 | Gomes 18'; Jojić 34'; Jović (yellow card) 59' | Report | Ubiparip (red card) 50' | Stadium: Partizan Stadium; Attendance: 6,767; Referee: (Serbia) Nikola Radaković |

| 27 February 2022 24 | Red Star Belgrade | 2–0 | Partizan | Belgrade |
| 18:00 | Omoijuanfo 30'; Srnić (yellow card) 34'; Katai 43'; Kanga (yellow card) 64'; Eraković (yellow card) 85'; Ben Nabouhane (yellow card) 90+2' | Report | Zdjelar (yellow card) 27' (yellow-red card) 86'; Jojić (yellow card) 32'; Marković (yellow card) 44'; Jevtović (yellow card) 48' | Stadium: Red Star Stadium; Attendance: 41,000; Referee: (Serbia) Srđan Jovanović |

| 3 March 2022 25 | Partizan | 2–1 | Mladost Lučani | Belgrade |
| 17:05 | Gomes 42'; Jojić (yellow card) 13' (goal) 54' | Report | Milosavljević (yellow card) 9'; Petrov (yellow card) 51'; Baha (yellow card) 66'; Bojović 88'; Cvetković (yellow card) 90+3' | Stadium: Partizan Stadium; Referee: (Serbia) Milan Mitić |

| 6 March 2022 26 | Spartak Subotica | 0–1 | Partizan | Subotica |
| 14:00 | Nikolić (yellow card) 44'; Rošević (yellow card) 71'; Ostojić (yellow card) 90+8' | Report | Živković (yellow card) 41'; Jović (yellow card) 62'; Natkho 84' (pen.) (yellow card) 90+1'; Urošević (yellow card) 90'; Smiljanić (yellow card) 90+4' | Stadium: Subotica City Stadium; Referee: (Serbia) Lazar Lukić |

| 13 March 2022 27 | Partizan | 0–0 | Napredak Kruševac | Belgrade |
| 14:30 | Gomes (yellow card) 29'; Marković (yellow card) 43'; Jevtović (yellow card) 90+8' | Report | Rašković (yellow card) 26'; Kojičić (yellow card) 43'; Stevanović (yellow card) 51'; Melunović (yellow card) 58'; Vasiljević (yellow card) 90+4' | Stadium: Partizan Stadium; Referee: (Serbia) Aleksandar Živković |

| 21 March 2022 28 | Radnik Surdulica | 1–2 | Partizan | Surdulica |
| 17:00 | Milovanović 27'; Oreščanin (yellow card) 51'; Mitošević (yellow card) 74' | Report | Terzić 34'; Gomes 48' (yellow card) 51'; Urošević (yellow card) 58'; Stevanović (yellow card) 90+2' | Stadium: Surdulica City Stadium; Referee: (Serbia) Miloš Milanović |

| 2 April 2022 29 | Partizan | 2–0 | TSC | Belgrade |
| 14:00 | Urošević 11', 38'; Marković (yellow card) 80' | Report | Petrović (yellow card) 53' | Stadium: Partizan Stadium; Referee: (Serbia) Marko Ivković |

| 10 April 2022 30 | Čukarički | 0–0 | Partizan | Belgrade |
| 19:05 | Kovačević (yellow card) 11'; Rakonjac (yellow card) 44' | Report | Jović (yellow card) 64' | Stadium: Čukarički Stadium; Referee: (Serbia) Novak Simović |

==== Championship round ====
| Pos | Team | Pld | W | D | L | GF | GA | GD | Pts | Qualification | RSB | PAR | ČUK | RNI | VOŽ | TSC | VOJ | NAP |
|---|---|---|---|---|---|---|---|---|---|---|---|---|---|---|---|---|---|---|
| 1 | Red Star Belgrade (C) | 37 | 32 | 4 | 1 | 95 | 19 | +76 | 100 | Qualification for the Champions League third qualifying round | | 0–0 | 1–0 | 4–1 | 3–1 | | | |
| 2 | Partizan | 37 | 31 | 5 | 1 | 85 | 13 | +72 | 98 | Qualification to Europa League third qualifying round | | | 3–1 | 2–0 | | 4–1 | 2–1 | |
| 3 | Čukarički | 37 | 15 | 15 | 7 | 54 | 34 | +20 | 60 | Qualification to Europa Conference League second qualifying round | | | | 0–0 | 0–0 | 2–3 | | 0–0 |
| 4 | Radnički Niš | 37 | 12 | 15 | 10 | 40 | 39 | +1 | 51 | Qualification to Europa Conference League second qualifying round | | | | | 0–0 | 2–0 | 1–0 | |
| 5 | Voždovac | 37 | 13 | 10 | 14 | 48 | 45 | +3 | 49 | | | 0–3 | | | | | 2–1 | 3–0 |

Source: SuperLiga (in Serbian)
Legend: Blue = home team win; Yellow = draw; Red = away team win.
Rules for classification: 1) Points; 2) Points in regular season; 3) Head-to-head points in regular season; 4) Head-to-head goal difference in regular season; 5) Head-to-head goals scored in regular season; 6) Head-to-head away goals scored in regular season (if two teams tied); 7) Goal difference; 8) Goals scored; 9) Fair play ranking; 10) Drawing of lots.
(C) Champions

===== Results by matchday =====
| Round | 1 | 2 | 3 | 4 | 5 | 6 | 7 |
|---|---|---|---|---|---|---|---|
| Ground | A | H | H | A | H | A | H |
| Result | D | W | W | W | W | W | W |
| Position | 2 | 2 | 2 | 2 | 2 | 2 | 2 |

Updated to match(es) played on 22 May 2022. Source: Partizan
A = Away; H = Home; W = Win; D = Draw; L = Loss

===== Results =====
| 16 April 2022 31 | Red Star Belgrade | 0–0 | Partizan | Belgrade |
| 18:00 | Rodić (yellow card) 30'; Pavkov (yellow card) 61'; Srnić (yellow card) 71'; Ben Nabouhane (yellow card) 88'; Krstičić (yellow card) 90+6' | Report | Terzić (yellow card) 80'; Vujačić (yellow card) 90+6' | Stadium: Red Star Stadium; Attendance: 40,000; Referee: (Serbia) Srđan Jovanović |

| 20 April 2022 32 | Partizan | 3–1 | Čukarički | Belgrade |
| 18:05 | Natkho 20' (pen.); Vujačić 48'; Gomes 52'; Jović (yellow card) 88' | Report | Drezgić (yellow card) 18'; N'Diaye (yellow card) 58'; Kovač 61'; Šapić (yellow card) 67' | Stadium: Partizan Stadium; Referee: (Serbia) Dejan Trifković |

| 27 April 2022 33 | Partizan | 4–1 | TSC | Belgrade |
| 14:00 | Menig (yellow card) 18'; Zdjelar (yellow card) 21'; Natkho 41' (yellow card) 53'; Gomes 43'; Miljković 48' (yellow card) 58'; Jović 62' | Report | Vukić 31'; Krsmanović (yellow card) 65' | Stadium: Partizan Stadium; Referee: (Serbia) Milan Mitić |

| 1 May 2022 34 | Napredak Kruševac | 0–3 | Partizan | Kruševac |
| 19:05 | Kojičić (yellow card) 22'; Jovanović (yellow card) 43' | Report | Gomes 29'; Jevtović 56'; Lutovac (yellow card) 60'; Marjanović 64' (o.g.); Živković (yellow card) 68'; Menig (yellow card) 74' | Stadium: Mladost Stadium; Attendance: 4,000; Referee: (Serbia) Stanko Ostraćanin |

| 7 May 2022 35 | Partizan | 2–1 | Vojvodina | Belgrade |
| 14:00 | Terzić 4'; Zdjelar (yellow card) 38'; Gomes 41'; Fejsa (yellow card) 83' | Report | Stevanović (yellow card) 45'; Simić (yellow card) 85'; Nešković 90' | Stadium: Partizan Stadium; Referee: (Serbia) Miloš Milanović |

| 16 May 2022 36 | Voždovac | 0–3 | Partizan | Belgrade |
| 20:30 | Ivezić (yellow card) 27'; Damjanović (yellow card) 43'; Milojević (yellow card) 51'; Pantović (yellow card) 79' | Report | Gomes 29' (pen.) 39' (pen.); Vujačić 66' | Stadium: Voždovac Stadium; Referee: (Serbia) Andrija Stojanović |

| 22 May 2022 37 | Partizan | 2–0 | Radnički Niš | Belgrade |
| 18:30 | Gomes 45+3' (pen.); Yamkam 66' (o.g.) | Report | Mitrović (yellow card) 21'; Vujadinović (yellow card) 45+2'; Arsić (red card) 45+5' | Stadium: Partizan Stadium; Attendance: 300; Referee: (Serbia) Milan Stefanović |

=== Serbian Cup ===
| 13 October 2021 First round | Partizan | 3–0 | Trayal | Belgrade |
| 16:30 | Menig 25', 49'; Živković 67'; Gomes (yellow card) 72'; Smiljanić (yellow card) 87' | Report | Gašić (yellow card) 57'; Pavlović (yellow card) 57'; Jović (yellow card) 66'; Matejević (yellow card) 75' | Stadium: Partizan Stadium; Attendance: 600; Referee: (Serbia) Miroslav Miletić |

| 1 December 2021 Second round | Dubočica | 0–1 | Partizan | Niš |
| 16:15 | Paunović (yellow card) 71'; Savić (yellow card) 78' | Report | Milovanović 39'; Šćekić (yellow card) 52' | Stadium: Čair Stadium; Attendance: 3,000; Referee: (Serbia) Stanko Ostraćanin |

| 6 April 2022 Quarter-final | Partizan | 2–0 | Loznica | Belgrade |
| 17:00 | Gomes 33'; Marković 45+1' | Report | Ivić (yellow card) 48'; Nikolić (yellow card) 71'; Vićentijević (yellow card) 90+2' | Stadium: Partizan Stadium; Referee: (Serbia) Nenad Minaković |

| 11 May 2022 Semi-final | Partizan | 2–1 | Vojvodina | Belgrade |
| 16:30 | Gomes 4'; Miljković (yellow card) 35'; Menig 43'; Jojić (yellow card) 59' | Report | Zukić 53' (yellow card) 4'; Jeličić (yellow card) 39' | Stadium: Partizan Stadium; Referee: (Serbia) Stanko Ostraćanin |

| 26 May 2022 Final | Red Star Belgrade | 2–1 | Partizan | Belgrade |
| 18:00 | Katai 26', 73' (yellow card) 73'; Kanga (yellow card) 45+4'; Rodić (yellow card) 54'; Pavkov (yellow card) 69'; Krstičić (yellow card) 90' | Report | Marković (yellow card) 45+4'; Urošević 62'; Lutovac (yellow card) 86' | Stadium: Red Star Stadium; Referee: (Serbia) Miloš Milanović |

=== UEFA Europa Conference League ===
==== Second qualifying round ====
| 22 July 2021 Second qualifying round | Partizan (Serbia) | 1–0 | (Slovakia) DAC Dunajská Streda | Belgrade, Serbia |
| 21:00 | Jović (yellow card) 14'; Marković 19'; Miljković (yellow card) 14' | Report | Vera (yellow card) 14'; Balić (yellow card) 22'; Taiwo (yellow card) 44'; Brunetti (yellow card) 71' | Stadium: Partizan Stadium; Attendance: 10,131; Referee: (Denmark) Jens Maae |

| 29 July 2021 Second qualifying round | DAC Dunajská Streda (Slovakia) | 0–2 (0–3 agg.) | (Serbia) Partizan | Dunajská Streda, Slovakia |
| 20:45 | Beskorovainyi (yellow card) 35'; Vera (yellow card) 51'; Nicolaescu (yellow card) 89' | Report | Urošević (yellow card) 11'; Vujačić (yellow card) 16'; Pantić 20' (yellow card) 35'; Jojić (yellow card) 50'; Gomes 80' | Stadium: MOL Aréna; Attendance: 4,085; Referee: (Switzerland) Alain Bieri |

==== Third qualifying round ====
| 5 August 2021 Third qualifying round | Sochi (Russia) | 1–1 | (Serbia) Partizan | Sochi, Russia |
| 18:00 | Barać (yellow card) 43'; Noboa 66' (pen.); Prokhin (yellow card) 71' | Report | Urošević (yellow card) 35'; Vujačić (yellow card) 63'; Marković (yellow card) 65'; Natkho (yellow card) 67'; Gomes 73' | Stadium: Fisht Olympic Stadium; Attendance: 308; Referee: (Moldova) Dumitri Muntean |

| 12 August 2021 Third qualifying round | Partizan (Serbia) | 2–2 (3–3 agg.) (4–2 p) | (Russia) Sochi | Belgrade, Serbia |
| 21:00 | Marković (yellow card) 32'; Jojić 55'; Šćekić 90' | Report | Terekhov 33', 76'; Popov (yellow card) 57'; Margasov (yellow card) 102' | Stadium: Partizan Stadium; Attendance: 13,131; Referee: (Denmark) Jakob Kehlet |
| | Penalties |
| | Živković (penalty scored); Gomes (penalty scored); Soumah (penalty scored); Vujačić (penalty scored) | | Tsallagov (penalty missed); Vorobyov (penalty scored); Joãozinho (penalty scored); Rodrigão (penalty missed) |

==== Play-off round ====
| 19 August 2021 Play-off round | Santa Clara (Portugal) | 2–1 | (Serbia) Partizan | Ponta Delgada, Portugal |
| 22:30 | Carvalho 4'; Boateng (yellow card) 5'; Morita 49' (yellow card) 53'; Patric (yellow card) 50' | Report | Jojić (yellow card) 33'; Vujačić 54'; Soumah (yellow card) 57'; Lutovac (yellow card) 86'; Urošević (yellow card) 90+2'; Saničanin (yellow card) 90+4' | Stadium: Estádio de São Miguel; Attendance: 924; Referee: (Netherlands) Serdar Gözübüyük |

| 26 August 2021 Play-off round | Partizan (Serbia) | 2–0 (3–2 agg.) | (Portugal) Santa Clara | Belgrade, Serbia |
| 21:00 | Gomes 25' (pen.); Saničanin 27' (yellow card) 72'; Jojić (yellow card) 42'; Vujačić (yellow card) 56'; Ostojić (yellow card) 88' | Report | Bouldini (yellow card) 53'; Villanueva (yellow card) 64'; Costa (yellow card) 76'; Mansur (yellow card) 79'; Patric (yellow card) 84' | Stadium: Partizan Stadium; Attendance: 14,525; Referee: (England) Craig Pawson |

==== Group stage ====
| Pos | Team | Pld | W | D | L | GF | GA | GD | Pts | Qualification |
|---|---|---|---|---|---|---|---|---|---|---|
| 1 | (Belgium) Gent | 6 | 4 | 1 | 1 | 6 | 2 | +4 | 13 | Advance to round of 16 |
| 2 | (Serbia) Partizan | 6 | 2 | 2 | 2 | 6 | 4 | +2 | 8 | Advance to knockout round play-offs |
| 3 | (Cyprus) Anorthosis Famagusta | 6 | 1 | 3 | 2 | 6 | 9 | −3 | 6 | |
| 4 | (Estonia) Flora | 6 | 1 | 2 | 3 | 5 | 8 | −3 | 5 | |

Source: UEFA
Rules for classification: Group stage tiebreakers

==== Results ====
| 16 September 2021 1 | Anorthosis Famagusta (Cyprus) | 0–2 | (Serbia) Partizan | Nicosia, Cyprus |
| 21:00 | Warda (yellow card) 50'; Christodoulopoulos (yellow card) 52' | Report | Šćekić (yellow card) 32'; Menig 42'; Zdjelar (yellow card) 50'; Obradović (yellow card) 56'; Gomes 68' | Stadium: GSP Stadium; Attendance: 5,000; Referee: (Denmark) Peter Kjaesgaard |

| 30 September 2021 2 | Partizan (Serbia) | 2–0 | (Estonia) Flora | Belgrade, Serbia |
| 18:45 | Marković 20', 42'; Pantić (yellow card) 76' | Report | | Stadium: Partizan Stadium; Attendance: 5,845; Referee: (Austria) Julian Weinberger |

| 21 October 2021 3 | Partizan (Serbia) | 0–1 | (Belgium) Gent | Belgrade, Serbia |
| 21:00 | Marković (yellow card) 90+7' | Report | Odjidja-Ofoe (yellow card) 5'; Kums 59' | Stadium: Partizan Stadium; Attendance: 8,943; Referee: (Scotland) Bobby Madden |

| 4 November 2021 4 | Gent (Belgium) | 1–1 | (Serbia) Partizan | Ghent, Belgium |
| 21:00 | Tissoudali 80' | Report | Urošević 66' | Stadium: Ghelamco Arena; Attendance: 10,595; Referee: (England) Chris Kavanagh |

| 25 November 2021 5 | Flora (Estonia) | 1–0 | (Serbia) Partizan | Tallinn, Estonia |
| 16:30 | Zenjov (yellow card) 31'; Miller 44'; Sappinen (yellow card) 69' | Report | Jović (yellow card) 51' | Stadium: Lilleküla Stadium; Attendance: 1,503; Referee: (Republic of Ireland) Rob Harvey |

| 9 December 2021 6 | Partizan (Serbia) | 1–1 | (Cyprus) Anorthosis Famagusta | Belgrade, Serbia |
| 18:45 | Milovanović 20'; Šćekić (yellow card) 65'; Popović (yellow card) 90+5' | Report | Christodoulopoulos 33' (pen.) | Stadium: Partizan Stadium; Attendance: 4,493; Referee: (Georgia (country)) Giorgi Kruashvili |

==== Knockout Phase ====
===== Knockout round play-offs =====
| 17 February 2022 Knockout round play-off | Sparta Prague (Czech Republic) | 0–1 | (Serbia) Partizan | Prague, Czech Republic |
| 21:00 | Hložek (yellow card) 67'; Krejčí (yellow card) 90' | Report | Marković (yellow card) 32'; Menig 78'; Terzić (yellow card) 90'; Vujačić (yellow card) 90' | Stadium: Stadion Letná; Attendance: 1,000; Referee: (Sweden) Andreas Ekberg |

| 24 February 2022 Knockout round play-off | Partizan (Serbia) | 2–1 (3–1 agg.) | (Czech Republic) Sparta Prague | Belgrade, Serbia |
| 18:45 | Gomes 7', 24' (yellow card) 6' (yellow-red card) 66'; Miletić (yellow card) 46'; Urošević (yellow card) 85'; Popović (yellow card) 90+1'; Holender (yellow card) 90+3'; Jevtović (yellow card) 90+4' | Report | Krejčí (yellow card) 35'; Čvančara (yellow card) 48'; Hložek 85'; Wiesner (yellow card) 90+4' | Stadium: Partizan Stadium; Attendance: 15,864; Referee: (Bulgaria) Georgi Kabakov |

===== Round of 16 =====
| 10 March 2022 First leg | Partizan (Serbia) | 2–5 | (Netherlands) Feyenoord | Belgrade, Serbia |
| 18:45 | Natkho 13'; Menig (yellow card) 16'; Jović 46'; Vujačić (yellow card) 78'; Holender (yellow card) 87' | Report | Toornstra 20', 77'; Aursnes (yellow card) 48'; Dessers 52'; Geertruida 64'; Sinisterra 71' | Stadium: Partizan Stadium; Attendance: 13,564; Referee: (Italy) Maurizio Mariani |

| 17 March 2022 Second leg | Feyenoord (Netherlands) | 3–1 (8–3 agg.) | (Serbia) Partizan | Rotterdam, Netherlands |
| 21:00 | Dessers 45'; Nelson 59'; Linssen 90' | Report | Saničanin (yellow card) 26'; Jevtović (yellow card) 44'; Gomes 61' | Stadium: De Kuip; Attendance: 40,850; Referee: (England) Anthony Taylor |

== Statistics ==
=== Squad statistics ===
| No. | Pos | Nat | Player | Total | | SuperLiga | | Cup | | Europa Conference League | |
| No. | Pos | Nat | Player | Apps | Goals | Apps | Goals | Apps | Goals | Apps | Goals |
Goalkeepers
| 1 | GK | (Serbia) SRB | Đorđe Mihajlović | 0 | 0 | 0 | 0 | 0 | 0 | 0 | 0 |
| 25 | GK | (Serbia) SRB | Milan Lukač | 0 | 0 | 0 | 0 | 0 | 0 | 0 | 0 |
| 41 | GK | (Serbia) SRB | Aleksandar Popović | 31 | 0 | 17 | 0 | 0 | 0 | 14 | 0 |
| 85 | GK | (Serbia) SRB | Nemanja Stevanović | 27 | 0 | 20 | 0 | 5 | 0 | 2 | 0 |
Defenders
| 4 | DF | (Bosnia and Herzegovina) BIH | Siniša Saničanin | 42 | 1 | 27 | 0 | 1 | 0 | 14 | 1 |
| 5 | DF | (Montenegro) MNE | Igor Vujačić | 47 | 4 | 31 | 3 | 2 | 0 | 14 | 1 |
| 17 | DF | (Serbia) SRB | Marko Živković | 33 | 2 | 23 | 1 | 3 | 1 | 7 | 0 |
| 23 | DF | (Serbia) SRB | Bojan Ostojić | 7 | 0 | 5 | 0 | 2 | 0 | 0 | 0 |
| 26 | DF | (Serbia) SRB | Aleksandar Miljković | 32 | 1 | 18 | 1 | 5 | 0 | 9 | 0 |
| 29 | DF | (Serbia) SRB | Mihajlo Ilić | 1 | 0 | 1 | 0 | 0 | 0 | 0 | 0 |
| 31 | DF | (Serbia) SRB | Rajko Brežančić | 0 | 0 | 0 | 0 | 0 | 0 | 0 | 0 |
| 37 | DF | (Serbia) SRB | Ivan Obradović | 15 | 1 | 8 | 1 | 1 | 0 | 6 | 0 |
| 72 | DF | (Serbia) SRB | Slobodan Urošević | 47 | 7 | 30 | 5 | 4 | 1 | 13 | 1 |
| 73 | DF | (Serbia) SRB | Nemanja Miletić | 32 | 0 | 20 | 0 | 5 | 0 | 7 | 0 |
Midfielders
| 6 | MF | (Israel) ISR | Bibras Natkho | 46 | 11 | 30 | 10 | 3 | 0 | 13 | 1 |
| 10 | MF | (Serbia) SRB | Lazar Pavlović | 16 | 0 | 12 | 0 | 2 | 0 | 2 | 0 |
| 15 | MF | (Serbia) SRB | Ljubomir Fejsa | 2 | 0 | 2 | 0 | 0 | 0 | 0 | 0 |
| 16 | MF | (Serbia) SRB | Saša Zdjelar | 50 | 0 | 32 | 0 | 4 | 0 | 14 | 0 |
| 21 | MF | (Serbia) SRB | Marko Jevtović | 20 | 1 | 13 | 1 | 3 | 0 | 4 | 0 |
| 39 | MF | (Serbia) SRB | Miloš Jojić | 53 | 7 | 33 | 6 | 4 | 0 | 16 | 1 |
| 55 | MF | (Serbia) SRB | Danilo Pantić | 26 | 4 | 16 | 3 | 2 | 0 | 8 | 1 |
| 99 | MF | (Serbia) SRB | Milan Smiljanić | 15 | 0 | 10 | 0 | 2 | 0 | 3 | 0 |
Forwards
| 8 | FW | (Hungary) HUN | Filip Holender | 37 | 3 | 22 | 3 | 3 | 0 | 12 | 0 |
| 9 | FW | (Netherlands) NED | Queensy Menig | 44 | 11 | 30 | 6 | 4 | 3 | 10 | 2 |
| 11 | FW | (Cape Verde) CPV | Ricardo Gomes | 51 | 38 | 35 | 29 | 5 | 2 | 11 | 7 |
| 14 | FW | (Serbia) SRB | Samed Baždar | 8 | 0 | 5 | 0 | 1 | 0 | 2 | 0 |
| 33 | FW | (Serbia) SRB | Marko Milovanović | 27 | 3 | 18 | 1 | 3 | 1 | 6 | 1 |
| 36 | FW | (Serbia) SRB | Nikola Terzić | 35 | 6 | 27 | 6 | 1 | 0 | 7 | 0 |
| 50 | FW | (Serbia) SRB | Lazar Marković | 39 | 4 | 21 | 0 | 4 | 1 | 14 | 3 |
| 51 | FW | (Serbia) SRB | Vanja Vlahović | 0 | 0 | 0 | 0 | 0 | 0 | 0 | 0 |
| 77 | FW | (Serbia) SRB | Nemanja Jović | 47 | 4 | 32 | 3 | 4 | 0 | 11 | 1 |
| 87 | FW | (Serbia) SRB | Nikola Lakčević | 0 | 0 | 0 | 0 | 0 | 0 | 0 | 0 |
| 90 | FW | (Serbia) SRB | Mihajlo Petković | 0 | 0 | 0 | 0 | 0 | 0 | 0 | 0 |
| 97 | FW | (Serbia) SRB | Aleksandar Lutovac | 39 | 1 | 25 | 1 | 5 | 0 | 9 | 0 |
Players transferred out during the season
| 15 | DF | (Serbia) SRB | Mateja Đorđević | 0 | 0 | 0 | 0 | 0 | 0 | 0 | 0 |
| 19 | MF | (Montenegro) MNE | Aleksandar Šćekić | 26 | 3 | 15 | 2 | 1 | 0 | 10 | 1 |
| 20 | MF | (Guinea) GUI | Seydouba Soumah | 5 | 1 | 2 | 1 | 0 | 0 | 3 | 0 |
| 32 | FW | (Serbia) SRB | Nikola Štulić | 1 | 0 | 1 | 0 | 0 | 0 | 0 | 0 |
| 88 | GK | (Serbia) SRB | Vladimir Stojković | 2 | 0 | 1 | 0 | 0 | 0 | 1 | 0 |

Last updated: 27 May 2022
Source: Competitions

=== Goal scorers ===
| Rank | No. | Pos | Nat | Name | SuperLiga | Serbian Cup | Europe | Total |
|---|---|---|---|---|---|---|---|---|
| 1 | 11 | FW | (Cape Verde) | Ricardo Gomes | 29 | 2 | 7 | 38 |
| 2 | 6 | MF | (Israel) | Bibras Natkho | 10 | 0 | 1 | 11 |
| 2 | 9 | FW | (Netherlands) | Queensy Menig | 6 | 3 | 2 | 11 |
| 3 | 39 | MF | (Serbia) | Miloš Jojić | 6 | 0 | 1 | 7 |
| 3 | 72 | DF | (Serbia) | Slobodan Urošević | 5 | 1 | 1 | 7 |
| 4 | 36 | MF | (Serbia) | Nikola Terzić | 6 | 0 | 0 | 6 |
| 5 | 55 | MF | (Serbia) | Danilo Pantić | 3 | 0 | 1 | 4 |
| 5 | 50 | FW | (Serbia) | Lazar Marković | 0 | 1 | 3 | 4 |
| 5 | 77 | FW | (Serbia) | Nemanja Jović | 3 | 0 | 1 | 4 |
| 5 | 5 | DF | (Montenegro) | Igor Vujačić | 3 | 0 | 1 | 4 |
| 6 | 8 | FW | (Hungary) | Filip Holender | 3 | 0 | 0 | 3 |
| 6 | 33 | FW | (Serbia) | Marko Milovanović | 1 | 1 | 1 | 3 |
| 6 | 19 | MF | (Montenegro) | Aleksandar Šćekić | 2 | 0 | 1 | 3 |
| 7 | 17 | DF | (Serbia) | Marko Živković | 1 | 1 | 0 | 2 |
| 8 | 20 | MF | (Guinea) | Seydouba Soumah | 1 | 0 | 0 | 1 |
| 8 | 97 | FW | (Serbia) | Aleksandar Lutovac | 1 | 0 | 0 | 1 |
| 8 | 4 | DF | (Bosnia and Herzegovina) | Siniša Saničanin | 0 | 0 | 1 | 1 |
| 8 | 37 | DF | (Serbia) | Ivan Obradović | 1 | 0 | 0 | 1 |
| 8 | 26 | DF | (Serbia) | Aleksandar Miljković | 1 | 0 | 0 | 1 |
| 8 | 21 | MF | (Serbia) | Marko Jevtović | 1 | 0 | 0 | 1 |
| Totals | | | | | 83 | 9 | 21 | 113 |

Last updated: 27 May 2022

=== Clean sheets ===
| Rank | No. | Pos | Nat | Name | SuperLiga | Serbian Cup | Europe | Total |
|---|---|---|---|---|---|---|---|---|
| 1 | 85 | GK | (Serbia) | Nemanja Stevanović | 15 | 3 | 0 | 18 |
| 2 | 41 | GK | (Serbia) | Aleksandar Popović | 8 | 0 | 5 | 13 |
| 3 | 88 | GK | (Serbia) | Vladimir Stojković | 1 | 0 | 1 | 2 |
| Totals | | | | | 24 | 3 | 6 | 33 |

Last updated: 22 May 2022

=== Disciplinary record ===
| Number | Nation | Position | Name | SuperLiga | | Serbian Cup | | Europe | | Total | |
| Number | Nation | Position | Name | Booked | Sent off (straight red) | Booked | Sent off (straight red) | Booked | Sent off (straight red) | Booked | Sent off (straight red) |
| 4 | (Bosnia and Herzegovina) | DF | Siniša Saničanin | 2 | 0 | 0 | 0 | 3 | 0 | 5 | 0 |
| 5 | (Montenegro) | DF | Igor Vujačić | 3 | 0 | 0 | 0 | 5 | 0 | 8 | 0 |
| 6 | (Israel) | MF | Bibras Natkho | 3 | 0 | 0 | 0 | 1 | 0 | 4 | 0 |
| 8 | (Serbia) | FW | Filip Holender | 1 | 0 | 0 | 0 | 2 | 0 | 3 | 0 |
| 9 | (Netherlands) | FW | Queensy Menig | 3 | 0 | 0 | 0 | 1 | 0 | 4 | 0 |
| 11 | (Cape Verde) | FW | Ricardo Gomes | 4 | 0 | 1 | 0 | 2 | 1 | 7 | 1 |
| 15 | (Serbia) | MF | Ljubomir Fejsa | 1 | 0 | 0 | 0 | 0 | 0 | 1 | 0 |
| 16 | (Serbia) | MF | Saša Zdjelar | 8 | 1 | 0 | 0 | 1 | 0 | 9 | 1 |
| 17 | (Serbia) | DF | Marko Živković | 3 | 0 | 0 | 0 | 0 | 0 | 3 | 0 |
| 19 | (Montenegro) | MF | Aleksandar Šćekić | 3 | 0 | 1 | 0 | 2 | 0 | 6 | 0 |
| 20 | (Guinea) | MF | Seydouba Soumah | 0 | 0 | 0 | 0 | 1 | 0 | 1 | 0 |
| 21 | (Serbia) | MF | Marko Jevtović | 2 | 0 | 0 | 0 | 2 | 0 | 4 | 0 |
| 23 | (Serbia) | DF | Bojan Ostojić | 0 | 0 | 0 | 0 | 1 | 0 | 1 | 0 |
| 26 | (Serbia) | DF | Aleksandar Miljković | 1 | 0 | 1 | 0 | 1 | 0 | 3 | 0 |
| 36 | (Serbia) | FW | Nikola Terzić | 1 | 0 | 0 | 0 | 1 | 0 | 2 | 0 |
| 37 | (Serbia) | DF | Ivan Obradović | 0 | 0 | 0 | 0 | 1 | 0 | 1 | 0 |
| 39 | (Serbia) | MF | Miloš Jojić | 4 | 0 | 1 | 0 | 3 | 0 | 8 | 0 |
| 41 | (Serbia) | GK | Aleksandar Popović | 0 | 0 | 0 | 0 | 2 | 0 | 2 | 0 |
| 50 | (Serbia) | FW | Lazar Marković | 3 | 0 | 1 | 0 | 4 | 0 | 8 | 0 |
| 55 | (Serbia) | MF | Danilo Pantić | 2 | 0 | 0 | 0 | 2 | 0 | 4 | 0 |
| 72 | (Serbia) | DF | Slobodan Urošević | 8 | 1 | 0 | 0 | 4 | 0 | 12 | 1 |
| 73 | (Serbia) | DF | Nemanja Miletić | 0 | 0 | 0 | 0 | 1 | 0 | 1 | 0 |
| 77 | (Serbia) | FW | Nemanja Jović | 5 | 0 | 0 | 0 | 2 | 0 | 7 | 0 |
| 85 | (Serbia) | GK | Nemanja Stevanović | 1 | 0 | 0 | 0 | 0 | 0 | 1 | 0 |
| 97 | (Serbia) | DF | Aleksandar Lutovac | 2 | 0 | 1 | 0 | 1 | 0 | 4 | 0 |
| 99 | (Serbia) | MF | Milan Smiljanić | 2 | 0 | 1 | 0 | 0 | 0 | 3 | 0 |
| | | | TOTALS | 61 | 2 | 7 | 0 | 42 | 1 | 110 | 3 |

Last updated: 27 May 2022

=== Game as captain ===
| Rank | No. | Pos | Nat | Name | SuperLiga | Serbian Cup | Europe | Total |
|---|---|---|---|---|---|---|---|---|
| 1 | 16 | MF | (Serbia) | Saša Zdjelar | 25 | 0 | 3 | 28 |
| 2 | 50 | FW | (Serbia) | Lazar Marković | 8 | 4 | 11 | 23 |
| 3 | 39 | MF | (Serbia) | Miloš Jojić | 2 | 1 | 1 | 4 |
| 4 | 88 | GK | (Serbia) | Vladimir Stojković | 1 | 0 | 1 | 2 |
| 5 | 37 | DF | (Serbia) | Ivan Obradović | 1 | 0 | 0 | 1 |
| Totals | | | | | 37 | 5 | 16 | 58 |

Last updated: 27 May 2022
