= Nikola Terzić =

Serbian footballer

Nikola Terzić Никола Терзић
Personal information
- Date of birth: 28 September 2000 (age 26)
- Place of birth: Jagodina, FR Yugoslavia
- Height: 1.77 m (5 ft 10 in)
- Position: Winger

Team information
- Current team: Borac Banja Luka
- Number: 36

Youth career
- Jagodina
- –2019: Čukarički

Senior career*
Years	Team	Apps	(Gls)
2019–2021	Čukarički	0	(0)
2019–2020	→ IMT (loan)	46	(20)
2021–2023	Partizan	36	(7)
2023	→ Bandırmaspor (loan)	11	(0)
2023	Hapoel Umm al-Fahm	3	(0)
2024	IMT	22	(2)
2025	Panserraikos	12	(0)
2025–	Borac Banja Luka	1	(0)

International career
2018–2019	Serbia U19	10	(2)
2021–2022	Serbia U21	7	(2)
- * Club domestic league appearances and goals as of 18 June 2025

Nikola Terzić (Serbian Cyrillic: Никола Терзић; born 28 September 2000) is a Serbian professional footballer who plays as a midfielder for Bosnian Premier League club Borac Banja Luka.

== Career ==
=== IMT ===
In July 2019, Terzić was loaned out to Serbian League Belgrade club IMT. After the club gained promotion in the 2019-20 season, he made his professional debut on 16 August 2020 in a 2-0 defeat to Radnički Sremska Mitrovica. Two weeks later, he scored his first professional goal as part of a brace in a 3-0 victory against Dinamo Vranje.

=== Partizan ===
==== 2020–21 season ====
In February 2021, Terzić rejected contract talks with previous club Čukarički. Shortly thereafter, he signed a four-year deal with Partizan. Terzić made his debut for Partizan on 5 May 2021, entering the field in the 77th minute instead of the scorer of the third goal, Miloš Jojić, in a 3-1 win over TSC.

== Career statistics ==
As of match played 3 August 2025

Appearances and goals by club, season and competition
Club	Season	League			National cup (Note: Includes Serbian Cup, Greek Cup)		Continental		Total	
Club	Season	Division	Apps	Goals	Apps	Goals	Apps	Goals	Apps	Goals
IMT (loan)	2019–20	Serbian League Belgrade	30	12	—		—		30	12
IMT (loan)	2020–21	Serbian First League	16	8	3	4	—		19	12
IMT (loan)	Total		46	20	3	4	—		49	24
Partizan	2020–21	Serbian SuperLiga	1	0	—		—		1	0
Partizan	2021–22	Serbian SuperLiga	27	6	1	0	7 (Note: Appearances in UEFA Conference League)	0	35	6
Partizan	2022–23	Serbian SuperLiga	8	1	1	0	3 (Note: One appearance in UEFA Europa League, two appearances in UEFA Conference League)	0	12	1
Partizan	Total		36	7	2	0	10	0	48	7
Bandırmaspor (loan)	2022–23	TFF First League	11	0	—		—		11	0
Hapoel Umm al-Fahm	2023–24	Liga Leumit	3	0	—		—		3	0
IMT	2023–24	Serbian SuperLiga	18	1	—		—		18	1
IMT	2024–25	Serbian SuperLiga	4	1	—		—		4	1
IMT	Total		22	2	—		—		22	2
Panserraikos	2024–25	Super League Greece	12	0	2	0	—		14	0
Borac Banja Luka	2025–26	Bosnian Premier League	1	0	0	0	—		1	0
Borac Banja Luka	2026–27	Bosnian Premier League	0	0	0	0	—		0	0
Borac Banja Luka	Total		1	0	0	0	—		1	0
Career total			131	29	7	4	10	0	148	33

== Honours ==
Borac Banja Luka

- Bosnian Premier League: 2025–26

Individual

- Serbian Cup Top goalscorer: 2020–21
- Serbian SuperLiga Player of the Week: 2021–22 (Round 14)
