= Nikola Dukić =

Serbian footballer

Personal information
- Date of birth: 10 January 1998 (age 28)
- Place of birth: Belgrade, Serbia
- Height: 1.78 m (5 ft 10 in)
- Position: Left back

Team information
- Current team: Trayal

Youth career
- 2013–2016: Partizan
- 2016–2019: Chievo

Senior career*
Years	Team	Apps	(Gls)
2019–2021	Mačva Šabac	22	(0)
2021	Voždovac	6	(0)
2021–2022	Žarkovo	20	(0)
2022–2023	Partizan		
2022–2023	→ Teleoptik (loan)		
2023	Kikinda		
2024-	Trayal		

International career
2014–2015	Serbia U17	7	(0)
2015–2016	Serbia U18	5	(0)
- * Club domestic league appearances and goals as of 12 September 2021

Nikola Dukić (Serbian Cyrillic: Никола Дукић; born 10 January 1998) is a Serbian footballer who plays for Trayal Kruševac.

== Career ==
In 2016, Dukić signed for Italian Serie A side Chievo after playing for the youth academy of Partizan, Serbia's most successful club, before being sent on loan to Bari's youth team for the 2017 Torneo di Viareggio.

In 2019, he signed for FK Mačva Šabac in the Serbian top flight.
