= Victor Amos =

Nigerian footballer

Personal information
- Date of birth: 5 March 1999 (age 27)
- Place of birth: Abuja, Nigeria
- Height: 1.70 m (5 ft 7 in)
- Position: Striker

Team information
- Current team: Trayal Kruševac

Youth career
- 2017–2018: UFC Asokoro Abuja
- 2018–2019: Mladost Lučani

Senior career*
Years	Team	Apps	(Gls)
2018–2021	Mladost Lučani	2	(0)
2021	Sloga Kraljevo	10	(2)
2022–	Trayal Kruševac	1	(0)
- * Club domestic league appearances and goals as of 25 June 2023

Victor Amos (born 5 March 1999) is a Nigerian professional footballer who plays as a striker for Serbian club Trayal Kruševac.

== Career ==
Born in Abuja, he played with local academy UFC Asokoro Abuja back in Nigeria. He moved abroad during the end of 2018, when there was winter-break in most European championships, and, after a period of trials, he signed with Serbian top-league side FK Mladost Lučani. Despite being in the extended list of players registered for the league, due to his age, and the high competitiveness in the attacking sector of the first-team, he spent most of initial time playing for Mladost in the Serbian youth league. However, his talent and performances, along with circumstances at the time, made Mladost direction board make him debut for the first-team in an official match for the 2018–19 Serbian SuperLiga. It was on 24 November 2018, in a away defeat against Radnik Surdulica by 1–0.
