= Dragan Tadić (Serbian footballer) =

Serbian footballer

Personal information
- Date of birth: 4 February 1977 (age 49)
- Place of birth: Trstenik, SFR Yugoslavia
- Height: 1.81 m (5 ft 11 in)
- Position: Forward

Senior career*
Years	Team	Apps	(Gls)
1993–1994	Prva Petoletka Trstenik	13	(0)
1995–2001	Napredak Kruševac	28	(4)
2001–2002	Trayal Kruševac	15	(1)
1993–1994	Napredak Kušiljevo	9	(0)
2002–2004	Napredak Kruševac	56	(21)
2004–2006	Smederevo	44	(6)
2006–2007	OFK Mladenovac	13	(3)
2007–2008	Napredak Kruševac	11	(0)
2008–2010	Sloga Kraljevo		
2010–2011	Prva Petoletka Trstenik		
2011–2012	Borac Bivolje		
- * Club domestic league appearances and goals

Dragan Tadić (Serbian Cyrillic: Драган Тадић; born 4 February 1977) is a Serbian former professional footballer who played as a forward.
