= Nikola Lakčević (footballer) =

Serbian association footballer

Personal information
- Date of birth: 28 October 1999 (age 27)
- Place of birth: Belgrade, FR Yugoslavia
- Height: 1.73 m (5 ft 8 in)
- Position: Winger

Team information
- Current team: Prva Iskra Barič

Youth career
- Rad

Senior career*
Years	Team	Apps	(Gls)
2016–2017	OFK Beograd	2	(0)
2017–2024	Partizan	9	(0)
2017–2019	→ Teleoptik (loan)	35	(2)
2024	→ Brodarac (loan)		
2024-	FK Prva Iskra Barič		
- * Club domestic league appearances and goals as of 6 June 2020

Nikola Lakčević (born 28 October 1999) is a Serbian footballer who plays as a winger.

== Career ==
=== Partizan ===
Lakčević moved to the club in 2017, but had to endure several years on loan before getting his chance in the first team. He made his league debut for the club on 18 August 2019, coming on as a 62nd minute substitute for Aleksandar Lutovac in a 3–0 home victory over FK Rad.
