= Igor Vujačić =

Montenegrin footballer (born 1994)

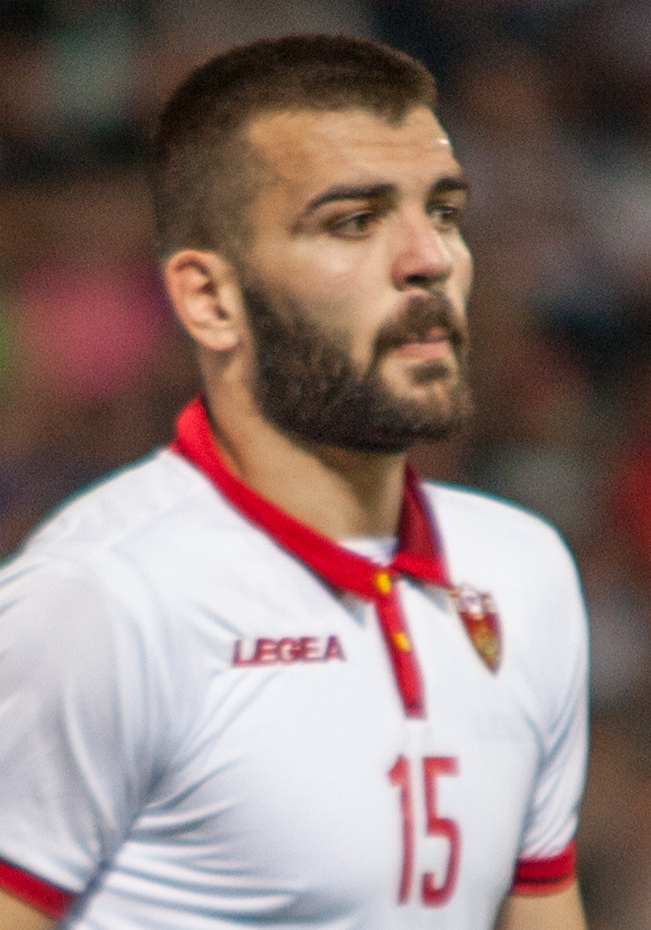
- Vujačić with Montenegro in 2019

Personal information
- Date of birth: 8 August 1994 (age 32)
- Place of birth: Podgorica, Montenegro, FR Yugoslavia
- Height: 1.88 m (6 ft 2 in)
- Position: Centre-back

Team information
- Current team: Rubin Kazan
- Number: 5

Senior career*
Years	Team	Apps	(Gls)
2011–2012	Zeta	22	(1)
2013	Vojvodina	2	(0)
2014	Widzew Łódź II	8	(1)
2014	Mogren	12	(0)
2015–2019	Zeta	133	(9)
2019–2023	Partizan	94	(9)
2023–	Rubin Kazan	93	(2)

International career^{‡}
2012	Montenegro U19 (Note: Only official UEFA matches included)	3	(0)
2013–2015	Montenegro U21	4	(0)
2019–	Montenegro	50	(0)
- * Club domestic league appearances and goals as of 21 November 2026 ‡ National team caps and goals as of 15 November 2026

Igor Vujačić (Montenegrin: Игор Вујачић; born 8 August 1994) is a Montenegrin professional footballer who plays as a defender for Russian club Rubin Kazan and the Montenegro national team.

== Club career ==
Vujačić made his first-team debut for Zeta in September 2011. He totaled 12 appearances and scored once during the 2011–12 season. In February 2013, Vujačić was transferred to Serbian club Vojvodina on a four-year contract. He, however, failed to make an impact and was released at the beginning of the following year. In April 2014, Vujačić joined Polish club Widzew Łódź and was immediately assigned to the reserve team.

After returning to his homeland, Vujačić signed with Mogren in the summer of 2014. He spent just half a season at Stadion Lugovi before rejoining his parent club Zeta. Over the following four and a half years, Vujačić established himself as one of the best defenders in the league, amassing 133 appearances and scoring nine goals.

In June 2019, Vujačić signed with Serbian club Partizan and was given the number 5 shirt. Vujačić made the Partizan debut on his 25th birthday, after he came on as a sub during the third round UEFA Europa League qualifier against Yeni Malatyaspor. In his first season, Vujačić mostly came into the game from the bench, he played only 12 competitive games.

Just one month after the start of the new season, Aleksandar Stanojević became the new coach of Partizan and Igor slowly became a regular first team player. He scored his first goal on 21 February 2021 in a 3–0 home win against Radnik Surdulica. One week later Vujačić scored his second goal in a 6–0 away win against Inđija.

On 12 August 2021, Vujačić played a big role in a return match of the UEFA Europa Conference League Third qualifying round against Sochi when he kicked the ball off the goal line in the 103rd minute of extra time and later during the penalty shootout he scored a fourth penalty that took Partizan to Play-off round. In the first game of the Play-off round, Vujačić scored a goal in a 2–1 loss against Santa Clara. In the 54th minute, Vujačić reduces the advantage of the Portuguese. A great action by Partizan started by Bibras Natcho from the free kick, the ball came to Aleksandar Šćekić who headed it to the other side to Vujačić. He headed the ball into the net and made the final score 2–1.

On 30 June 2023, Partizan announced that Vujačić left the club for the Russian Premier League side Rubin Kazan. Rubin announced a three-year contract with Vujačić on 4 July 2023. On 15 July 2025, his contract with Rubin was extended to 2029.

== International career ==
Vujačić represented his country at under-19 and under-21 level. He made his full international debut for Montenegro on 7 June 2019, playing the full 90 minutes in a 1–1 draw with Kosovo.

== Career statistics ==
=== Club ===
As of match played 21 November 2026

Appearances and goals by club, season and competition
Club	Season	League			National cup (Note: Includes Montenegrin Cup, Serbian Cup, Russian Cup)		Europe		Other		Total	
Club	Season	Division	Apps	Goals	Apps	Goals	Apps	Goals	Apps	Goals	Apps	Goals
FK Zeta	2012–13	Montenegrin First League	0	0	0	0	6 (Note: Appearances in UEFA Europa League)	1	0	0	6	1
FK Zeta	2014–15	Montenegrin First League	14	2	3	0	0	0	—		17	3
FK Zeta	2015–16	Montenegrin First League	26	0	3	0	0	0	—		29	0
FK Zeta	2016–17	Montenegrin First League	28	1	3	0	0	0	—		31	1
FK Zeta	2017–18	Montenegrin First League	33	5	0	0	2	0	—		35	5
FK Zeta	2018–19	Montenegrin First League	32	1	1	0	0	0	—		33	1
FK Zeta	Total		133	9	10	0	8	1	0	0	151	10
FK Vojvodina	2012–13	Serbian SuperLiga	2	0	—		—		—		2	0
FK Vojvodina	2013–14	Serbian SuperLiga	0	0	0	0	0	0	—		0	0
FK Vojvodina	Total		2	0	0	0	0	0	0	0	0	0
Widzew Łódź II	2014–15	III liga	8	1	—		—		—		8	1
FK Mogren	2014–15	Montenegrin First League	12	0	—		—		—		12	0
Partizan Belgrade	2019–20	Serbian SuperLiga	8	0	1	0	1	0	0	0	10	0
Partizan Belgrade	2020–21	Serbian SuperLiga	22	4	4	1	0	0	0	0	26	5
Partizan Belgrade	2021–22	Serbian SuperLiga	31	3	2	0	14 (Note: Appearances in UEFA Europa Conference League)	1	0	0	47	4
Partizan Belgrade	2022–23	Serbian SuperLiga	33	2	0	0	11 (Note: Two appearances in UEFA Europa League, nine appearances in UEFA Europa Conference League)	0	0	0	44	2
Partizan Belgrade	Total		94	9	7	1	26	1	0	0	127	10
Rubin Kazan	2023–24	Russian Premier League	28	0	4	0	—		—		32	0
Rubin Kazan	2024–25	Russian Premier League	27	0	8	0	—		—		35	0
Rubin Kazan	2025–26	Russian Premier League	25	1	5	0	—		—		30	1
Rubin Kazan	2026–27	Russian Premier League	13	1	4	0	—		—		17	1
Rubin Kazan	Total		93	2	21	0	—		—		114	2
Career total			342	17	38	1	34	2	0	0	414	20

=== International ===
As of match played 15 November 2026

Appearances and goals by national team and year
National team	Year	Apps	Goals
Montenegro	2019	3	0
Montenegro	2020	5	0
Montenegro	2021	9	0
Montenegro	2022	8	0
Montenegro	2023	6	0
Montenegro	2024	7	0
Montenegro	2025	4	0
Montenegro	2026	8	0
Total		50	0
