= Aleksandar Popović (footballer, born 1999) =

Serbian footballer

Personal information
- Full name: Aleksandar Popović
- Date of birth: 29 September 1999 (age 27)
- Place of birth: Užice, FR Yugoslavia
- Height: 1.90 m (6 ft 3 in)
- Position: Goalkeeper

Team information
- Current team: Slovan Bratislava
- Number: 1

Youth career
- Sloboda Užice
- Partizan

Senior career*
Years	Team	Apps	(Gls)
2017–2023	Partizan	67	(0)
2017	→ Teleoptik (loan)	4	(0)
2018	→ Teleoptik (loan)	14	(0)
2023–2026	DAC Dunajská Streda	81	(0)
2026–	Slovan Bratislava	6	(0)

International career^{‡}
2015–2016	Serbia U17 (Note: Official UEFA matches only)	8	(0)
2017	Serbia U19	2	(0)
2020	Serbia U21	1	(0)
2021–	Serbia	1	(0)
- * Club domestic league appearances and goals as of 31 October 2026 ‡ National team caps and goals as of 9 December 2021

Aleksandar Popović (Serbian Cyrillic: Александар Поповић; born 29 September 1999) is a Serbian professional footballer who plays as a goalkeeper for Slovan Bratislava.

== Club career ==
=== Partizan ===
After coming through the youth system of Partizan, Popović was loaned to affiliated club Teleoptik in the summer of 2017. He was promoted back to the Partizan first team during the 2018 winter transfer window. After failing to make his official debut for the side, Popović was again loaned to Teleoptik in the summer of 2018. He was recalled back to Partizan in early 2019.

On 19 June 2020, Popović made his official debut for Partizan in a 1–0 away loss at Vojvodina in the last round of the COVID-19-shortened 2019–20 Serbian SuperLiga. He would become the first-choice goalkeeper for the 2020–21 Serbian SuperLiga, mainly due to new league requirements for under-21 players, making 21 appearances in the process.

Upon the departure of Vladimir Stojković, Popović made his debut in European competitions on 29 July 2021, keeping a clean sheet and saving a penalty in a 2–0 away victory over Slovak club DAC Dunajská Streda in the UEFA Conference League. He extended his contract with Partizan two months later, keeping him with the club until 2024.

During 2022–23 UEFA Europa Conference League Group D, Popović kept a clean sheet twice against FC Köln.

=== DAC Dunajská Streda ===
Aleksandar Popović officially left Partizan on July 28, 2023 and signed a contract with DAC Dunajská Streda. The young goalkeeper signed a three-year contract with the new club, while Partizan received €210,000 from the transfer, plus certain percentages from the next sale. Popović made his debut in goal on August 5, 2023 in a 5–2 win over FC Košice.

== International career ==
Popović was capped for Serbia at under-17, under-19 and under-21 levels in UEFA competitions. He made his full international debut for Serbia in a goalless friendly with Panama on 28 January 2021.

== Career statistics ==
=== Club ===
As of 3 November 2026

Appearances and goals by club, season and competition
Club	Season	League			Cup		Continental		Total	
Club	Season	Division	Apps	Goals	Apps	Goals	Apps	Goals	Apps	Goals
Partizan	2017–18	Serbian SuperLiga	0	0	0	0	0	0	0	0
Partizan	2018–19	Serbian SuperLiga	0	0	0	0	0	0	0	0
Partizan	2019–20	Serbian SuperLiga	1	0	0	0	0	0	1	0
Partizan	2020–21	Serbian SuperLiga	21	0	0	0	0	0	21	0
Partizan	2021–22	Serbian SuperLiga	17	0	0	0	14	0	31	0
Partizan	2022–23	Serbian SuperLiga	28	0	0	0	11	0	39	0
Partizan	Total		67	0	0	0	25	0	92	0
Teleoptik (loan)	2017–18	Serbian First League	4	0	0	0	—		4	0
Teleoptik (loan)	2018–19	Serbian First League	14	0	0	0	—		14	0
Teleoptik (loan)	Total		18	0	0	0	—		18	0
DAC Dunajská Streda	2023–24	Slovak First Football League	31	0	3	0	0	0	34	0
DAC Dunajská Streda	2024–25	Slovak First Football League	27	0	1	0	2	0	30	0
DAC Dunajská Streda	2025–26	Slovak First Football League	23	0	1	0	—		24	0
DAC Dunajská Streda	Total		81	0	5	0	2	0	88	0
Slovan Bratislava	2026–27	Slovak First Football League	6	0	1	0	2	0	9	0
Career total			172	0	6	0	29	0	207	0

=== International ===
As of 7 October 2021

Appearances and goals by national team and year
National team	Year	Apps	Goals
Serbia	2021	1	0
Total		1	0

== Honours ==
Partizan

- Serbian Cup: 2017–18, 2018–19
