= Slobodan Urošević =

Serbian footballer (born 1994)

Personal information
- Date of birth: 15 April 1994 (age 32)
- Place of birth: Belgrade, FR Yugoslavia
- Height: 1.84 m (6 ft 0 in)
- Position: Left-back

Team information
- Current team: TSC
- Number: 72

Youth career
- Rad

Senior career*
Years	Team	Apps	(Gls)
2012–2014	Rad	18	(0)
2012	→ BASK (loan)	13	(0)
2014–2017	Napredak Kruševac	74	(7)
2015–2016	→ OH Leuven (loan)	2	(0)
2018–2023	Partizan	139	(12)
2023–2025	Aris Limassol	52	(2)
2025–2026	TSC	27	(0)
2026–	Kyzylzhar	12	(2)

International career^{‡}
2013	Serbia U19 (Note: Only official UEFA matches included)	6	(0)
2016–2021	Serbia	3	(0)
Medal record
Gold medal – first place	UEFA Under-19 Championship	2013
- * Club domestic league appearances and goals as of 1 November 2026 ‡ National team caps and goals as of 29 January 2021 (UTC)

Slobodan Urošević (Serbian Cyrillic: Слободан Урошевић; born 15 April 1994) is a Serbian professional footballer who plays as a left-back and is currently playing for TSC. He made three appearances for the Serbia national team.

== Club career ==
After coming through the youth system of Rad, Urošević made his senior debuts on loan at BASK in late 2012. He returned to his parent club in early 2013, recording two appearances until the end of the season. He made his debut for Rad on 2 May 2013, in the league game that his club lost 1–0 against Vojvodina in Novi Sad. He played one more league match until the end of that season, and in the following 2013–14. He played in 17 league matches.

In the summer of 2014, Urošević signed with Napredak Kruševac. He was a standard first team member of Napredek during the 2014–15 season. He moved on a season-long loan to Belgian side OH Leuven in July 2015, with an option for a permanent deal. In the summer of 2016, he returned to Napredak, and in October of the same year, he extended his contract with the club from Kruševac. In the 2016–17 season. Urošević played 34 league matches for Napredak, and during the first half of the 2017–18 season. He made 14 more appearances in this competition.

On 11 January 2018, Urošević was transferred to Partizan on a four-year contract as the first choice of coach Miroslav Đukić. Urošević made his debut on 15 February, in UEFA Europa League Round of 32 as he played full 90 minutes in a 1–1 home draw against Viktoria Plzeň. He found himself in the starting eleven in the return leg a week later and once again played a whole game, as Partizan was defeated 2–0 on Doosan Arena in Plzeň. Urošević won Serbian Cup with Partizan as he made two appearances in the competition.

The following season Urošević played 23 league matches and won the Cup once again as he made five appearances in the competition. Urošević was in the Starting lineup for the final game that Partizan won 1–0 against fierce rival Red Star. In the UEFA Europa League 2019–20 Group L Urošević played full 90 minutes in all six games against Manchester United, AZ Alkmaar and Astana. He netted his first goal for the club on 1 December 2019 in a 2–0 away victory over Mačva, Partizan had the initiative, but there were no real opportunities until the 70th minute, when Urošević scored a goal, after the ball bounced to him after a free kick. Urošević failed to win his third Cup Trophy in a row as Partizan was defeated in the final by Vojvodina.

Since coming to Partizan, the 2021–22 season was the best for Urošević, he played 47 games and scored 7 goals in three competitions. Urošević scored a goal on 4 November 2021 in the fourth round of the UEFA Conference League against Gent. Urošević managed to create enough space for himself and fired at the ball. It was immediately clear from the trajectory where that shot would end, and the goalkeeper of the Belgian representative, Sinan Bolat, only managed to see it off with a glance. In his fourth successive cup final, Urošević scored the equalizer in a 2–1 defeat against Red Star.

== International career ==
Urošević represented Serbia at the 2013 UEFA European Under-19 Championship. He made four appearances in the tournament, helping the team win the gold medal.

On 29 September 2016, Urošević appeared for Serbia as a substitute in a friendly against Qatar. The team, composed entirely of players from the country's domestic league, went on to lose the game 3–0.

== Career statistics ==
As of 8 May 2025

Appearances and goals by club, season and competition
Club	Season	League			Cup		Continental		Other		Total	
Club	Season	Division	Apps	Goals	Apps	Goals	Apps	Goals	Apps	Goals	Apps	Goals
Rad	2012–13	Serbian SuperLiga	0	0	2	0	—		—		2	0
Rad	2013–14	Serbian SuperLiga	18	0	0	0	—		—		18	0
Rad	Total		18	0	2	0	—		—		20	0
Napredak Kruševac	2014–15	Serbian SuperLiga	26	1	1	0	—		—		27	1
Napredak Kruševac	2016–17	Serbian SuperLiga	34	4	1	0	—		—		35	4
Napredak Kruševac	2017–18	Serbian SuperLiga	14	2	1	0	—		—		15	2
Napredak Kruševac	Total		74	7	3	0	—		—		77	7
OH Leuven (loan)	2015–16	Belgian Pro League	2	0	0	0	—		—		2	0
Partizan	2017–18	Serbian SuperLiga	4	0	2	0	2	0	—		8	0
Partizan	2018–19	Serbian SuperLiga	23	0	5	0	—		—		28	0
Partizan	2019–20	Serbian SuperLiga	22	1	4	0	12	0	—		38	1
Partizan	2020–21	Serbian SuperLiga	25	2	4	0	3	0	—		32	2
Partizan	2021–22	Serbian SuperLiga	30	5	4	1	13	1	—		47	7
Partizan	2022–23	Serbian SuperLiga	35	4	1	0	11	2	—		47	6
Partizan	Total		139	12	20	1	41	3	—		200	16
Aris Limassol	2023–24	Cypriot First Division	32	2	4	0	9	0	1	0	46	2
Aris Limassol	2024–25	Cypriot First Division	19	0	1	1	—		—		20	1
Aris Limassol	Total		51	2	5	1	9	0	1	0	66	3
TSC	2025–26	Serbian SuperLiga	27	0	1	0	—		—		28	0
Career total			313	21	29	2	50	3	1	0	393	26

== Honours ==
Partizan

- Serbian Cup: 2017–18, 2018–19

Aris Limassol

- Cypriot Super Cup: 2023

Serbia U19

- UEFA Under-19 Championship: 2013

Individual

- Serbian SuperLiga Player of the Week: 2022–23 (Round 18)
