= Lazar Pavlović =

Serbian association footballer (born 2001)

Personal information
- Full name: Lazar Pavlović
- Date of birth: 2 November 2001 (age 25)
- Place of birth: Obrenovac, FR Yugoslavia
- Height: 1.71 m (5 ft 7 in)
- Position: Midfielder

Team information
- Current team: Ušće (on loan from IMT)

Youth career
- 2006–2011: Obrenovac 1905
- 2011–2019: Partizan

Senior career*
Years	Team	Apps	(Gls)
2019–2022	Partizan	48	(1)
2022	AEL Limassol	0	(0)
2023	Radnički Niš	13	(0)
2024	Voždovac	6	(0)
2025–	IMT	1	(0)
2025–	→ Ušće (loan)	2	(0)

International career^{‡}
2017	Serbia U17 (Note: Only official UEFA matches included)	3	(1)
2019	Serbia U19	3	(4)
2021–2022	Serbia U21	3	(0)
- * Club domestic league appearances and goals as of 23 August 2025 ‡ National team caps and goals as of 7 June 2022

Lazar Pavlović (Serbian Cyrillic: Лазар Павловић; born 2 November 2001) is a Serbian professional footballer who plays as a midfielder for Ušće, on loan from IMT.

== Club career ==
Pavlović was promoted to the senior squad by manager Savo Milošević, receiving the number 10 jersey and playing the full 90 minutes in a 1–1 away draw against Radnički Niš on 15 May 2019, as Partizan reached the final of the Serbian Cup. He signed his first professional contract with the club three days later, penning a three-year deal.

== International career ==
Pavlović has represented Serbia at under-17 and under-19 levels.

== Statistics ==
As of 10 October 2019

Club	Season	League		Cup		Continental		Total	
Club	Season	Apps	Goals	Apps	Goals	Apps	Goals	Apps	Goals
Partizan	2018–19	1	0	2	0	0	0	3	0
Partizan	2019–20	16	0	3	2	3	0	22	2
Partizan	2020–21	19	1	2	1	0	0	21	2
Partizan	2021–22	12	0	2	0	3	0	17	0
Career total		48	1	9	3	6	0	63	4

== Honours ==
Partizan

- Serbian Cup: 2018–19
