= Milan Smiljanić =

Serbian association footballer (born 1986)

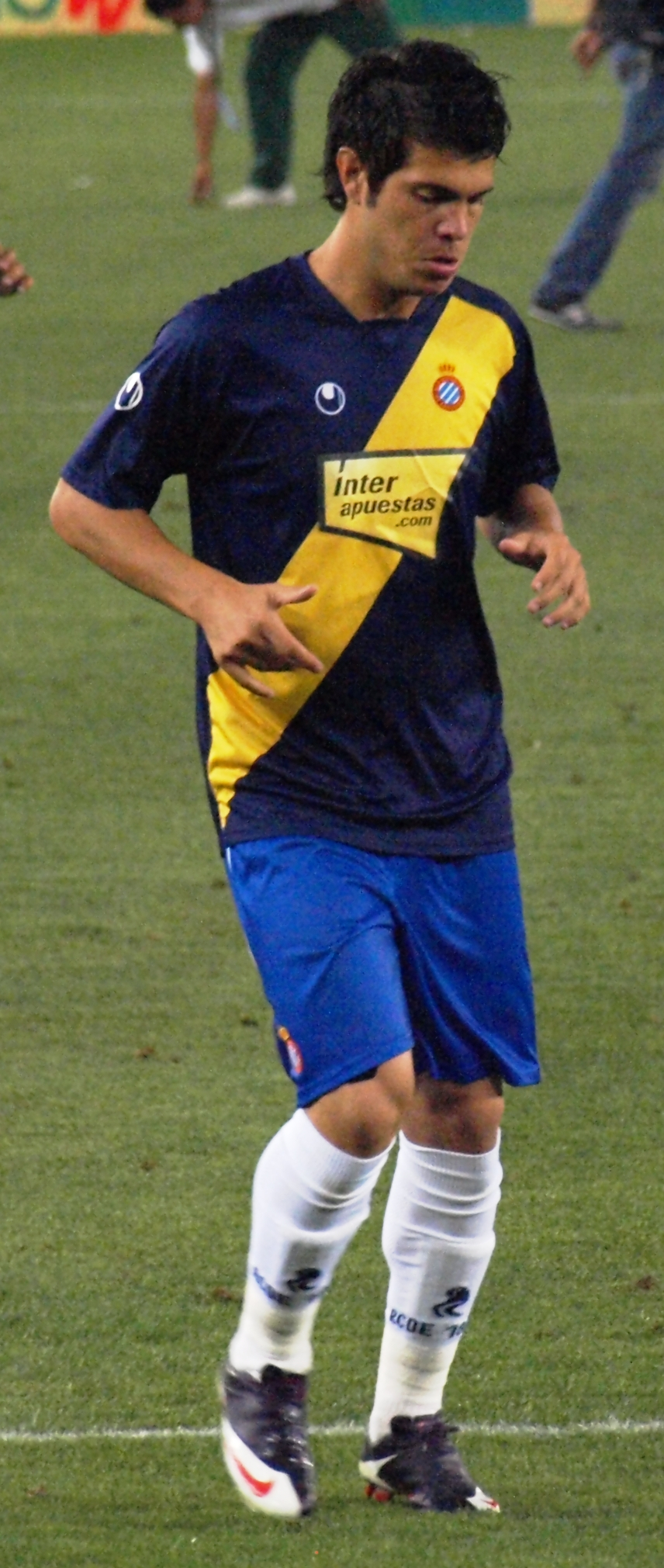
- Smiljanić with Espanyol in 2009

Personal information
- Full name: Milan Smiljanić
- Date of birth: 19 November 1986 (age 39)
- Place of birth: Kalmar, Sweden
- Height: 1.83 m (6 ft 0 in)
- Position: Midfielder

Team information
- Current team: Rad
- Number: 19

Youth career
- 1992–2005: Partizan

Senior career*
Years	Team	Apps	(Gls)
2005–2007	Partizan	48	(1)
2007–2011	Espanyol	47	(0)
2010	→ Sporting Gijón (loan)	6	(0)
2010–2011	→ Partizan (loan)	18	(1)
2011–2013	Partizan	47	(1)
2013–2015	Gençlerbirliği	1	(0)
2015–2016	Maccabi Netanya	31	(0)
2016–2017	Perth Glory	15	(0)
2017–2018	Hapoel Ashkelon	29	(1)
2018–2022	Partizan	36	(0)
2022	Mornar	18	(0)
2023	OFK Beograd	12	(1)
2025–	Rad	22	(1)

International career
2006–2009	Serbia U21	28	(2)
2007–2008	Serbia	6	(1)
Medal record
Silver medal – second place	UEFA Under-21 Championship	2007
- * Club domestic league appearances and goals as of 15 July 2026

Milan Smiljanić (Serbian Cyrillic: Милан Смиљанић, pronounced [mǐlan smǐʎanitɕ]; born 19 November 1986) is a Serbian footballer who plays as a midfielder for Rad.

== Early life ==
Smiljanić was born in Kalmar, Sweden, as his father Branko, who was also a professional footballer, was playing for Kalmar AIK FK at the time.

== Club career ==
=== Partizan ===
Smiljanić subsequently returned to Serbia and joined FK Partizan youth ranks. Under head coach Vladimir Vermezović, he made his debut for the first team in a league match against FK Sutjeska Nikšić, during the second part of 2004–05.

Smiljanić also spent some time playing for farm team FK Teleoptik and, in little more than two professional seasons, he amassed more than 50 official appearances with the club, and eventually gained club captaincy despite his age.

=== Espanyol ===
On 18 July 2007, Spain's RCD Espanyol agreed with Partizan for the transfer of Smiljanić for an undisclosed fee, in a five-year contract. He made his La Liga debut against Real Valladolid on 26 August, in a 0–1 home loss; most of his first two seasons in Catalonia were spent mainly appearing from the bench, even though one of his main competitors in the team, Iván de la Peña, was often injured.

After the club's initial unsuccessful attempts to loan him out for 2009–10, Smiljanić spent the first months of the new campaign only training, not having been given any squad number. However, such a move was arranged in late January 2010, as he joined Sporting de Gijón until June.

=== Partizan return ===
In the summer of 2010, Smiljanić was loaned to his former club Partizan. After his loan expired he returned to Spain and agreed the contract termination with the Barcelona-based club.

Smiljanić signed a permanent contract with Partizan on 16 August 2011, penning a two-year deal.

=== Gençlerbirliği ===
On 29 May 2013, it was announced that Gençlerbirliği S.K. had agreed terms with Smiljanić to sign him as a free agent. He appeared in only four competitive games during his spell, his Süper Lig debut coming on 19 October 2013 in a 1–3 home loss against Kasımpaşa SK.

Smiljanić was released on 30 June 2015.

=== Later years ===
On 30 July 2015, Smiljanić joined Maccabi Netanya F.C. on a 1+1 contract. He left Israel the following 9 August, moving alongside countryman Nebojša Marinković to A-League club Perth Glory FC. On 16 February 2017, he left the latter via mutual termination of his contract to explore opportunities in Asia.

On 15 June 2017, Smiljanić returned to the Israeli Premier League and signed with newly promoted Hapoel Ashkelon FC.

=== Partizan, Take Three ===
In June 2018, Smiljanić returned to his original club for the third time, committing to a two-year contract. In June 2019, he was appointed vice-captain of Partizan.

== International career ==
After the 2006–07 season, Smiljanić was called up by Serbia under-21 coach Miroslav Đukić to be part of his squad for the 2007 UEFA European Championships. He helped the national side finish runner-up in the tournament, to hosts the Netherlands.

Smiljanić made his full debut on 22 August 2007, in a 2–3 loss against Belgium in Brussels for the UEFA Euro 2008 qualifiers. In July of the following year he was picked to the 18-man squad for the 2008 Summer Olympics, with Đukić again as manager – Serbia ranked last in its group.

Next year, Smiljanić appeared in the 2009 European Under-21 Championship as captain, but could not help repeat the previous edition's feat as the nation did not progress through the group stages in his country of birth, Sweden.

== Career statistics ==
=== Club ===
As of end of 2021–22 season

Club performance			League		Cup		Continental		Total	
Season	Club	League	Apps	Goals	Apps	Goals	Apps	Goals	Apps	Goals
2004–05	Partizan	Serbian SuperLiga	2	0	0	0	0	0	2	0
2005–06	Partizan	Serbian SuperLiga	15	1	1	0	0	0	16	1
2006–07	Partizan	Serbian SuperLiga	31	0	3	1	8	0	42	1
Total			48	1	4	1	8	0	60	2
2007–08	Espanyol	La Liga	30	0	4	0	—		34	0
2008–09	Espanyol	La Liga	17	0	5	0	—		22	0
2009–10	Espanyol	La Liga	0	0	0	0	—		0	0
Total			47	0	9	0	—		56	0
2009–10	Sporting Gijón	La Liga	6	0	0	0	—		6	0
2010–11	Partizan	Serbian SuperLiga	18	1	3	0	7	0	28	1
2011–12	Partizan	Serbian SuperLiga	23	0	3	0	1	0	27	0
2012–13	Partizan	Serbian SuperLiga	24	1	1	0	6	0	31	1
Total			65	2	7	0	14	0	86	2
2013–14	Gençlerbirliği	Süper Lig	1	0	3	0	––		4	0
2015–16	Maccabi Netanya	Israeli Premier League	31	0	6	0	—		37	0
2016–17	Perth Glory	A-League	15	0	1	0	—		16	0
2017–18	Hapoel Ashkelon	Israeli Premier League	29	1	4	0	—		33	1
2018–19	Partizan	Serbian SuperLiga	13	0	4	0	2	0	19	0
2019–20	Partizan	Serbian SuperLiga	7	0	1	0	0	0	8	0
2020–21	Partizan	Serbian SuperLiga	6	0	0	0	1	0	7	0
2021–22	Partizan	Serbian SuperLiga	10	0	2	0	3	0	15	0
Total			36	0	7	0	6	0	49	0
Career total			278	4	37	1	28	0	348	5

=== International ===
As of 31 May 2008

Serbia
Year	Apps	Goals
2007	2	1
2008	4	0
Total	6	1

=== International goals ===
#	Date	Venue	Opponent	Score	Result	Competition
1.	17 October 2007	Tofiq Bahramov, Baku, Azerbaijan	Azerbaijan	5–1	6–1	Euro 2008 qualifying
