= Miloš Jojić =

Serbian footballer (born 1992)

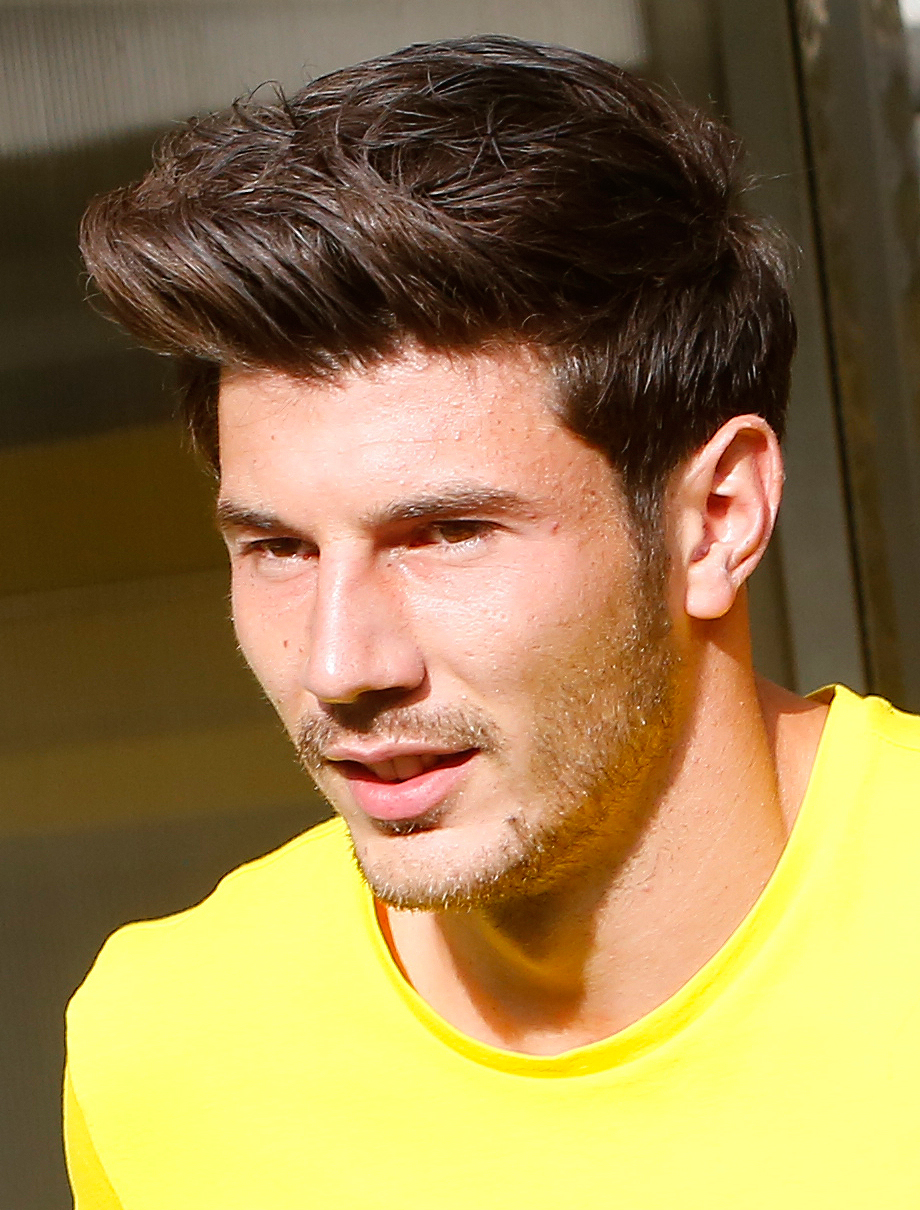
- Jojić with Borussia Dortmund in 2014

Personal information
- Date of birth: 19 March 1992 (age 34)
- Place of birth: Stara Pazova, SFR Yugoslavia
- Height: 1.77 m (5 ft 10 in)
- Position: Midfielder

Team information
- Current team: Borac Banja Luka
- Number: 18

Youth career
- Jedinstvo Stara Pazova
- 2003–2010: Partizan

Senior career*
Years	Team	Apps	(Gls)
2010–2012	Teleoptik	60	(14)
2012–2014	Partizan	35	(10)
2014–2015	Borussia Dortmund	20	(4)
2015–2018	1. FC Köln	59	(8)
2018–2020	İstanbul Başakşehir	8	(0)
2020	→ Wolfsberger AC (loan)	14	(1)
2020–2022	Partizan	58	(10)
2023–2024	Riga	58	(7)
2025	Castellón	11	(0)
2025–	Borac Banja Luka	32	(4)

International career
2011	Serbia U19 (Note: Only official UEFA matches included)	5	(1)
2012–2015	Serbia U21	21	(3)
2013–2014	Serbia	5	(1)
- * Club domestic league appearances and goals as of 20 September 2026

Miloš Jojić (Serbian Cyrillic: Милош Јојић, pronounced [mǐloʃ jôjitɕ]; born 19 March 1992) is a Serbian professional footballer who plays as an attacking midfielder for Bosnian Premier League club Borac Banja Luka.

== Club career ==
=== Early years ===
Jojić joined the youth system of Partizan in 2003. He made his senior debut with Teleoptik in 2010. On 24 January 2012, together with Miloš Ostojić, Jojić signed his first professional contract with Partizan, on a four-year deal. He eventually stayed on loan at Teleoptik until the end of the 2011–12 season. During his time at Teleoptik, Jojić scored 14 goals in 60 league appearances.

=== Partizan ===
On 15 September 2012, Jojić scored on his competitive debut for Partizan in a 5–2 home league win over Hajduk Kula. On 18 May 2013, Jojić scored the winning goal from a free kick in the 90th minute of the Belgrade derby, which sealed the club's sixth consecutive championship title.

=== Borussia Dortmund ===
On 31 January 2014, Jojić signed a four-and-a-half-year contract with Borussia Dortmund, for a transfer fee believed to be around €2.5 million. He made his first appearance for the club on 15 February 2014, coming on as a 67th-minute substitute in a home league fixture against Eintracht Frankfurt. After just 17 seconds of action, Jojić scored with his first touch, a tap in after Kevin Großkreutz's shot was parried, to make the score 4–0. This was the fastest goal ever scored by a Bundesliga debutant, though four seconds too slow to be the fastest goal ever scored by a substitute; a record held by Uwe Wassmer.

=== 1. FC Köln ===
On 5 July 2015, Jojić joined 1. FC Köln for a reported fee of €3 million. On 8 August 2015, he made his competitive debut in a 4–0 win at SV Meppen in the first round of the DFB-Pokal.

=== Başakşehir ===
On 10 July 2018, the club announced that Jojić had been sold to the Turkish side İstanbul Başakşehir F.K. On 3 February 2020, he joined Austrian Bundesliga club Wolfsberger on loan.

=== Partizan ===
On 3 October 2020, Jojić returned to the Serbian SuperLiga, rejoining Partizan.

=== Riga ===
After finishing his contract with Partizan in the summer of 2022, Jojić joined Latvian club Riga, on 9 February 2023.

=== Castellón ===
On 15 January 2025, Jojić was announced at Spanish Segunda División side CD Castellón.

== International career ==
Jojić represented Serbia at the 2011 UEFA Under-19 Championship in Romania, managing to score once in the team's opening game against Turkey. Jojić was also a member of the team that took part at the 2015 UEFA Under-21 Championship in the Czech Republic, being eliminated in the group stage.

He made his debut for the senior team in a friendly against Japan on 11 October 2013, scoring a goal in the 90th minute of the game. He earned a total of 5 caps (1 goal) and his final international was a November 2014 friendly match away against Greece.

== Career statistics ==
=== Club ===
As of match played 20 September 2026

Club	Season	League			National cup (Note: Includes Serbian Cup, DFB-Pokal, Turkish Cup, Latvian Cup)		Continental		Total	
Club	Season	Division	Apps	Goals	Apps	Goals	Apps	Goals	Apps	Goals
Teleoptik	2010–11	Serbian First League	30	4	2	0	—		32	4
Teleoptik	2011–12	Serbian First League	30	10	1	1	—		31	11
Teleoptik	Total		60	14	3	1	0	0	63	15
Partizan	2012–13	Serbian SuperLiga	20	4	1	0	6 (Note: Appearances in UEFA Europa League)	0	27	4
Partizan	2013–14	Serbian SuperLiga	15	6	3	0	5 (Note: Three appearances in UEFA Champions League; two appearances and one goal in UEFA Europa League)	1	23	7
Partizan	Total		35	10	4	0	11	1	50	11
Borussia Dortmund	2013–14	Bundesliga	10	4	2	0	3 (Note: Appearances in UEFA Champions League)	0	15	4
Borussia Dortmund	2014–15	Bundesliga	10	0	2	0	2	0	14	0
Borussia Dortmund	Total		20	4	4	0	5	0	29	4
1. FC Köln	2015–16	Bundesliga	15	2	2	0	—		17	2
1. FC Köln	2016–17	Bundesliga	19	4	2	0	—		21	4
1. FC Köln	2017–18	Bundesliga	25	2	3	0	6	1	34	3
1. FC Köln	Total		59	8	7	0	6	1	72	9
İstanbul Başakşehir	2018–19	Süper Lig	8	0	4	1	2	0	14	1
Wolfsberger AC (loan)	2019–20	Austrian Bundesliga	14	1	0	0	0	0	14	1
Partizan	2020–21	Serbian SuperLiga	25	4	5	0	0	0	30	4
Partizan	2021–22	Serbian SuperLiga	33	6	4	0	16 (Note: Appearances in UEFA Europa Conference League)	1	53	7
Partizan	Total		58	10	9	0	16	1	83	11
Riga	2023	Latvian Higher League	32	5	2	0	5	0	39	5
Riga	2024	Latvian Higher League	26	2	2	0	2	0	30	2
Riga	Total		58	7	4	0	7	0	69	7
Castellón	2024–25	Segunda División	11	0	—		—		11	0
Borac Banja Luka	2025–26	Bosnian Premier League	26	4	—		—		26	4
Borac Banja Luka	2026–27	Bosnian Premier League	6	0	0	0	8 (Note: Two appearances in UEFA Champions League; four appearances in UEFA Conference League)	1	14	1
Borac Banja Luka	Total		32	4	0	0	8	1	40	5
Career total			355	58	35	2	55	4	445	64

=== International ===
Appearances and goals by national team and year
National team	Year	Apps	Goals
Serbia
Serbia	2013	1	1
Serbia	2014	4	0
Total		5	1

==== International goals ====
Scores and results list Serbia's goal tally first.

#	Date	Venue	Opponent	Score	Result	Competition
1	11 October 2013	Karađorđe Stadium, Novi Sad	Japan	2–0	2–0	Friendly

== Honours ==
Partizan

- Serbian SuperLiga: 2012–13

Borussia Dortmund

- DFL-Supercup: 2014

Riga

- Latvian Cup: 2023

Borac Banja Luka

- Bosnian Premier League: 2025–26
