= Aleksandar Lutovac =

Serbian association footballer

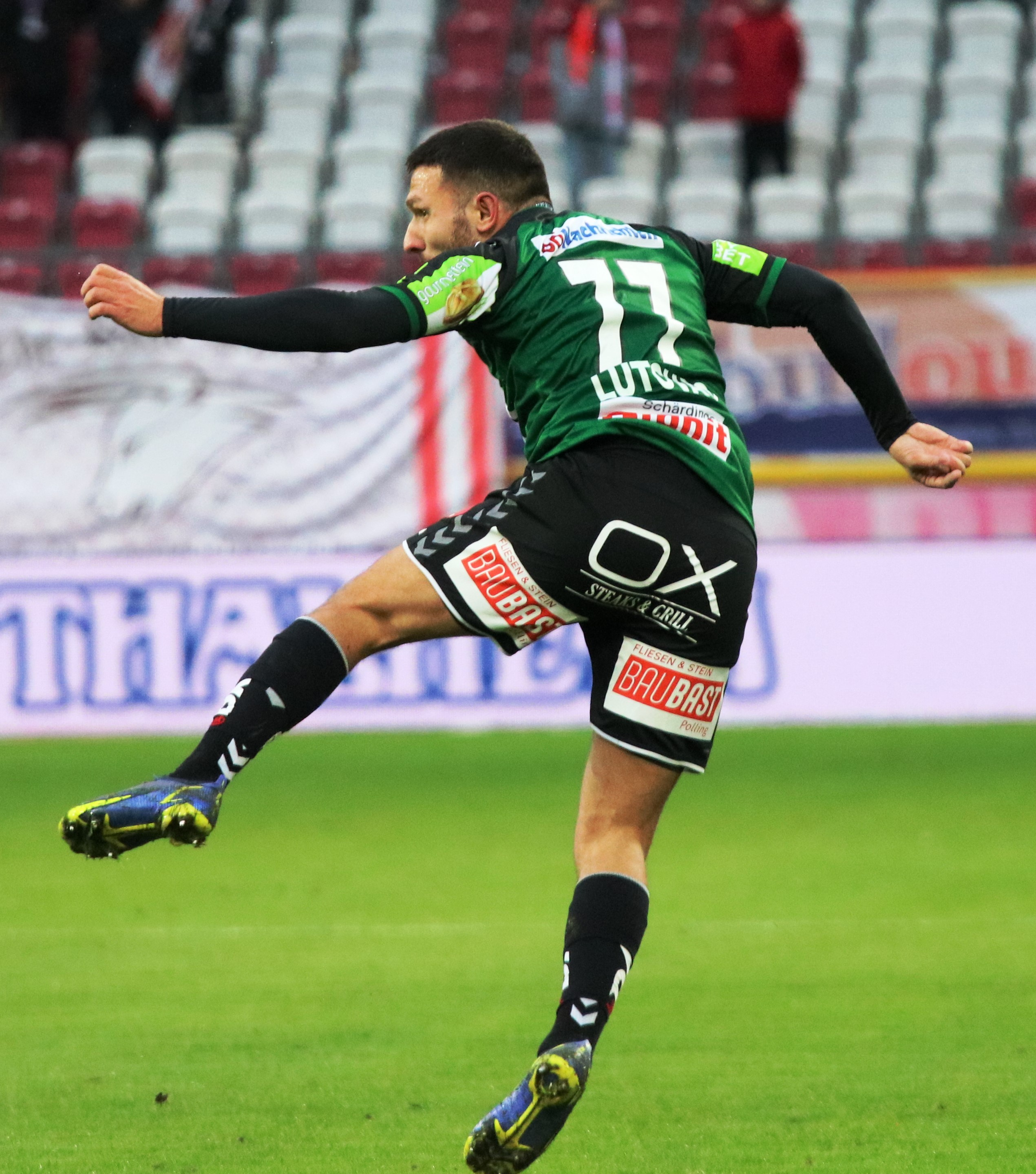
- Lutovac in 2023

Personal information
- Date of birth: 28 June 1997 (age 29)
- Place of birth: Belgrade, FR Yugoslavia
- Height: 1.80 m (5 ft 11 in)
- Positions: Winger; right-back

Team information
- Current team: Smederevo 1924
- Number: 30

Youth career
- Petlić Beograd
- Red Star Belgrade
- Petlić Beograd
- Rad

Senior career*
Years	Team	Apps	(Gls)
2015–2019	Rad	106	(22)
2019–2023	Partizan	60	(2)
2023	Ried	16	(0)
2024–2025	IMT	43	(5)
2025–2026	Napredak Kruševac	24	(2)
2026–	Smederevo 1924	0	(0)

International career^{‡}
2014–2016	Serbia U19 (Note: Only official UEFA matches included)	8	(0)
2017–2019	Serbia U21	6	(4)
- * Club domestic league appearances and goals as of 13 June 2026 ‡ National team caps and goals as of 15 September 2019

Aleksandar Lutovac (Serbian Cyrillic: Александар Лутовац; born 28 June 1997) is a Serbian professional footballer who plays as a winger for Smederevo 1924.

== Club career ==
=== Rad ===
With the Rad under-19 team, Lutovac won the national championship in the 2014–15 season, earning them a spot in the 2015–16 UEFA Youth League. He was subsequently promoted to the first-team squad, scoring the winning goal in a 2–1 away win over Vojvodina on his Serbian SuperLiga debut on 19 September 2015. Two months later, Lutovac signed his first professional contract with the club on a four-year deal. He netted his first brace in a 3–1 away victory at Mladost Lučani on 17 April 2016. In his first senior season with Rad, Lutovac made 23 league appearances and scored six goals. He also played regularly during the following 2016–17 season, netting four goals in 31 league appearances. On 3 March 2018, Lutovac scored his first hat-trick in a 5–0 home win over Borac Čačak. He was the team's top scorer in the 2017–18 Serbian SuperLiga with 11 goals.

=== Partizan ===
In late June 2019, Lutovac officially joined Partizan on a free transfer and was given the number 97 shirt. He made his competitive debut for the club in a 4–0 home league win over Mačva Šabac, playing the full 90 minutes.

Lutovac scored his first goal for Partizan on 9 October 2019, in a 0-6 win against Vodojaža in the Serbian Cup round of 32. Lutovac played a total of 89 games for Partizan scored three goals and recorded eight assists.

=== SV Ried ===
On 31 August 2023, Lutovac's contact with SV Ried was terminated by mutual consent.

== International career ==
After representing Serbia at under-19 level, Lutovac became the under-21 team's second-highest scorer in their successful 2019 UEFA European Under-21 Championship qualifiers with four goals in five games. He was included in Goran Đorović's final 23-man squad for the main tournament in June 2019.

== Statistics ==
As of 8 February 2023

Club	Season	League		Cup		Continental		Total	
Club	Season	Apps	Goals	Apps	Goals	Apps	Goals	Apps	Goals
Rad	2015–16	23	6	1	0	—		24	7
Rad	2016–17	31	4	1	0	—		32	4
Rad	2017–18	34	11	0	0	—		34	11
Rad	2018–19	18	1	0	0	—		18	1
Rad	Total	106	22	2	0	—		108	22
Partizan	2019–20	8	0	1	1	3	0	12	1
Partizan	2020–21	18	0	3	0	1	0	22	0
Partizan	2021–22	24	1	5	0	9	0	38	1
Partizan	2022–23	10	1	1	0	6	0	17	1
Partizan	Total	60	2	10	1	19	0	89	3
Career total		166	23	12	1	19	0	197	25
