= Nemanja Jović =

Serbian footballer

Personal information
- Full name: Nemanja Jović
- Date of birth: 8 August 2002 (age 24)
- Place of birth: Zvornik, Bosnia and Herzegovina
- Height: 1.75 m (5 ft 9 in)
- Position: Winger

Team information
- Current team: Kalba
- Number: 80

Youth career
- Partizan

Senior career*
| Years | Team | Apps | (Gls) |
| 2020–2023 | Partizan | 74 | (10) |
| 2024 | Estoril | 3 | (0) |
| 2024– | Kalba | 23 | (2) |

International career^{‡}
| 2018–2019 | Bosnia and Herzegovina U17 | 5 | (1) |
| 2021 | Serbia U19 | 2 | (0) |
| 2021–2023 | Serbia U21 | 4 | (1) |
| 2021– | Serbia | 2 | (0) |
- * Club domestic league appearances and goals as of 30 August 2026 ‡ National team caps and goals as of 17:38, 15 January 2024 (UTC)

Nemanja Jović (born 8 August 2002) is a professional footballer who plays as a winger for UAE Pro League club Kalba. Born in Bosnia, he plays for the Serbia national team.

== Club career ==
On 16 December 2020, Jović made his official senior debut for the club in a 4–0 home league victory over FK Mladost Lučani, coming on as a 69th-minute substitute for Seydouba Soumah.

In January 2024, six months after leaving Partizan, Jović signed a contract until June 2027 with Primeira Liga club Estoril.

== International career ==
Jović made his debut for Serbia national football team on 7 June 2021 in a friendly against Jamaica.

== Career statistics ==
=== International ===
As of 11 June 2021

Serbia
| Year | Apps | Goals |
|---|---|---|
| 2021 | 2 | 0 |
| Total | 2 | 0 |
