= Aleksandar Šćekić =

Montenegrin footballer

Aleksandar Šćekić Александар Шћекић
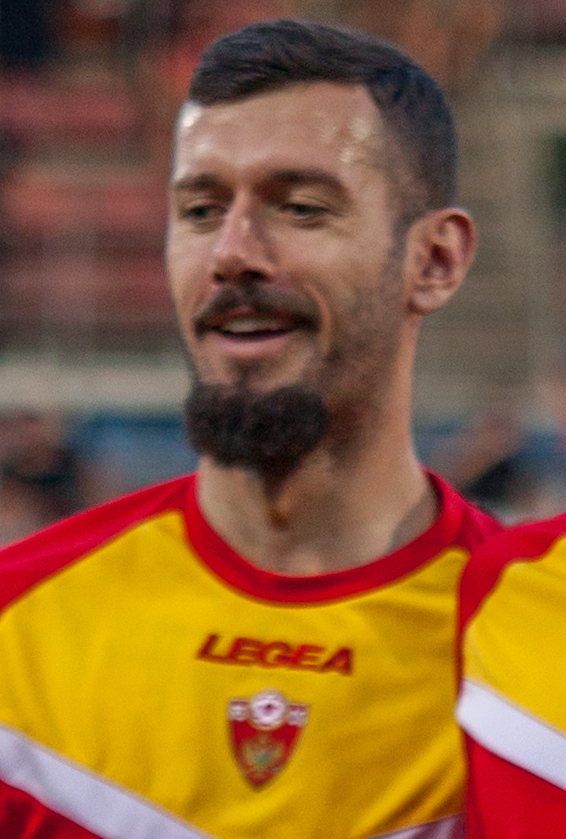
- Šćekić with Montenegro in 2019

Personal information
- Full name: Aleksandar Šćekić
- Date of birth: 12 December 1991 (age 34)
- Place of birth: Ivangrad, SR Montenegro, SFR Yugoslavia
- Height: 1.93 m (6 ft 4 in)
- Position: Defensive midfielder

Team information
- Current team: Sutjeska Nikšić
- Number: 55

Youth career
- Berane

Senior career*
Years	Team	Apps	(Gls)
2009–2013	Berane	55	(3)
2010	→ Lovćen (loan)	13	(1)
2012	→ Jedinstvo Bijelo Polje (loan)	12	(0)
2013–2016	Bokelj	86	(9)
2016–2018	Gençlerbirliği	35	(2)
2018–2022	Partizan	92	(9)
2022	Zagłębie Lubin	11	(0)
2022	Dibba Al Fujairah	10	(1)
2023	Hapoel Haifa	12	(1)
2023–2025	Partizan	43	(2)
2025–	Sutjeska Nikšić	30	(0)

International career^{‡}
2007	Montenegro U17 (Note: Official UEFA matches only)	3	(0)
2009–2010	Montenegro U19	6	(0)
2010	Montenegro U21	2	(0)
2016–	Montenegro	40	(0)
- * Club domestic league appearances and goals as of 24 August 2026 ‡ National team caps and goals as of 8 September 2023

Aleksandar Šćekić (Serbian Cyrillic: Александар Шћекић; born 12 December 1991) is a Montenegrin professional footballer who plays as a defensive midfielder for Sutjeska Nikšić.

== Club career ==
=== Berane ===
Šćekić made his senior debut at his hometown club Berane in the 2009–10 Montenegrin First League, as the team suffered relegation to the Second League. He was subsequently loaned to Lovćen, continuing to play in the top flight, before returning to Berane in the second half of the 2010–11 Montenegrin Second League and helping them earn promotion back to the First League via playoffs. However, they were immediately relegated back to the second tier. He was then loaned out to Jedinstvo Bijelo Polje, spending there the first half of the 2012–13 Montenegrin First League, before rejoining Berane until the end of the 2012–13 Montenegrin Second League.

=== Bokelj ===
In the summer of 2013, Šćekić joined fellow Second League club Bokelj and instantly helped them win the championship and promotion to the First League. He played regularly in the top flight over the next two seasons, earning himself a call-up to the national team.

=== Gençlerbirliği ===
In June 2016, Šćekić moved abroad and signed with Turkish club Gençlerbirliği on a three-year deal. He scored two times in 24 games during the 2017–18 Süper Lig, once in a 2–1 home win over Beşiktaş and once in a 5–1 away loss against Galatasaray.

=== Partizan ===
On 21 August 2018, Šćekić signed a three-year contract with Serbian club Partizan, being handed the number 19 shirt. He made his debut for the team two days later, coming on as a substitute for compatriot Nebojša Kosović in a 1–1 home draw with Beşiktaş. On 5 May 2019, Šćekić scored his first goal for Partizan, giving his team a 2–1 win over Napredak Kruševac. He made 28 appearances across all competitions in his first season with the Crno-beli, helping them win the Serbian Cup.

On 25 July 2019, Šćekić netted his first goal of the season to give Partizan a 1–0 win over Welsh club Connah's Quay Nomads in the first leg of the Europa League second qualifying round. He made a career-high 38 appearances during the 2019–20 campaign, scoring three goals.

In January 2021, Šćekić extended his contract with Partizan until 2023. He made 40 appearances and scored five goals in the 2020–21 season, both career highs, but the club ended without a trophy for the second year in a row.

=== Zagłębie Lubin ===
On 23 January 2022, Šćekić moved to Poland and signed a one-and-a-half-year contract with Ekstraklasa side Zagłębie Lubin. On 1 June 2022, his contract was terminated by mutual consent, with Šćekić wishing to be closer to his family in Montenegro cited as one of the reasons.

== International career ==
Šćekić was capped for Montenegro at under-17, under-19 and under-21 levels. He made his full international debut for Montenegro under Ljubiša Tumbaković, playing the first 85 minutes of a 2–1 friendly loss against Greece on 24 March 2016.

== Career statistics ==
=== Club ===
As of 25 May 2025

Appearances and goals by club, season and competition
Club	Season	League			Cup		Continental		Other		Total	
Club	Season	Division	Apps	Goals	Apps	Goals	Apps	Goals	Apps	Goals	Apps	Goals
Berane	2009–10	Montenegrin First League	24	1			—		2 (Note: Appearances in Montenegrin First League Promotion/relegation playoffs)	0	26	1
Berane	2010–11	Montenegrin Second League					—		2	0	2	0
Berane	2011–12	Montenegrin First League	31	2			—		2	0	33	2
Berane	2012–13	Montenegrin Second League					—		—			
Berane	Total		55	3			—		6	0	61	3
Lovćen (loan)	2010–11	Montenegrin First League	13	1			—		—		13	1
Jedinstvo Bijelo Polje (loan)	2012–13	Montenegrin First League	12	0			—		—		12	0
Bokelj	2013–14	Montenegrin Second League	25	3	1	0	—		—		26	3
Bokelj	2014–15	Montenegrin First League	30	3	0	0	—		—		30	3
Bokelj	2015–16	Montenegrin First League	31	3	5	1	—		—		36	4
Bokelj	Total		86	9	6	1	—		—		92	10
Gençlerbirliği	2016–17	Süper Lig	11	0	6	0	—		—		17	0
Gençlerbirliği	2017–18	Süper Lig	24	2	3	0	—		—		27	2
Gençlerbirliği	Total		35	2	9	0	—		—		44	2
Partizan	2018–19	Serbian SuperLiga	21	1	5	0	2	0	—		28	1
Partizan	2019–20	Serbian SuperLiga	23	2	4	0	11	1	—		38	3
Partizan	2020–21	Serbian SuperLiga	33	4	4	1	3	0	—		40	5
Partizan	2021–22	Serbian SuperLiga	15	2	1	0	11	1	—		27	3
Partizan	Total		92	9	14	1	27	2	—		133	12
Zagłębie Lubin	2021–22	Ekstraklasa	11	0	—		—		—		11	0
Dibba Al Fujairah	2022–23	UAE Pro League	10	1	1	0	—		—		11	1
Hapoel Haifa	2022–23	Israeli Premier League	12	1	—		—		—		12	1
Partizan	2023–24	Serbian SuperLiga	16	0	3	0	4	0	—		23	0
Partizan	2024–25	Serbian SuperLiga	27	2	2	0	1	0	—		30	2
Career total			369	28	35	2	32	2	6	0	442	32

=== International ===
As of 8 September 2023

Appearances and goals by national team and year
National team	Year	Apps	Goals
Montenegro	2016	6	0
Montenegro	2017	3	0
Montenegro	2018	6	0
Montenegro	2019	2	0
Montenegro	2020	5	0
Montenegro	2021	7	0
Montenegro	2022	7	0
Montenegro	2023	4	0
Total		40	0

== Honours ==
Bokelj

- Montenegrin Second League: 2013–14

Partizan

- Serbian Cup: 2018–19
