= Marko Živković =

Serbian footballer

Personal information
- Full name: Marko Živković
- Date of birth: 17 May 1994 (age 32)
- Place of birth: Smederevo, FR Yugoslavia
- Height: 1.73 m (5 ft 8 in)
- Position: Right-back

Team information
- Current team: Teleoptik

Youth career
- 2005–2011: Partizan

Senior career*
Years	Team	Apps	(Gls)
2011–2012	Teleoptik	38	(0)
2013	Partizan	9	(0)
2014	Vojvodina	17	(0)
2015	Sūduva	35	(1)
2016–2018	Dunajská Streda	55	(2)
2019	Radnički Niš	3	(0)
2019–2021	Voždovac	32	(2)
2021–2025	Partizan	50	(2)
2025	→ Teleoptik (loan)		
2026–	Loznica	4	(0)
- * Club domestic league appearances and goals as of 1 November 2026 ‡ National team caps and goals as of 29 October 2020

Marko Živković (Serbian Cyrillic: Марко Живковић; born 17 May 1994) is a Serbian professional footballer who plays as a right-back for Teleoptik.

== Career ==
After coming through the youth academy of Partizan, Živković made his senior debut with their affiliated side Teleoptik. He was promoted back to Partizan in the winter of 2013, penning a four-year deal. On 22 May 2013, Živković made his competitive debut for the club in a 2–0 away win against Smederevo. He made two league appearances in the 2012–13 season, as the club won the national championship title. On 24 January 2014, Živković signed a contract with Vojvodina until the summer of 2016. He was a member of the team that won the 2013–14 Serbian Cup.

== Honours ==
Partizan

- Serbian SuperLiga: 2012–13

Vojvodina

- Serbian Cup: 2013–14
