= FK Trayal Kruševac =

Trayal
- Full name: Fudbalski Klub Trayal
- Nickname: Gumari (Tiremen)
- Founded: 1933; 93 years ago
- Ground: Mladost Stadium
- Capacity: 10,331
- President: Miloš Kocić
- Head coach: Bojan Miladinović
- League: Serbian First League
- 2024–25: Serbian First League, 10th of 16
- Website: fktrayal.rs
Home colours	Away colours	Third colours

Fudbalski klub Trayal (Serbian Cyrillic: Фудбалски клуб Трајал) is a professional football club from Kruševac, Serbia. They compete in the Serbian First League, the second tier of the national league system.

== History ==
The football club was formed in 1933 as a part of the "Obilićevo" sports association. It was named after the local gunpowder company "Obilićevo". They played the first match in November 1933 and beat Trgovački, also from Kruševac, with 6–0.

After World War II the gunpowder company changed its name to "Miloje Zakić" and by mid-70s developed into what is today a tire manufacturer Trayal Corporation. The football club changed its name accordingly to Trayal.

The club remained in local and regional leagues for most of its history until after the NATO bombing of Yugoslavia. At the time, Trayal was playing in Serbian League Timok which was a 3rd tier of competition in FR Yugoslavia. The next 1999–2000 season saw the expansion of the Second League and Trayal gained promotion to the national level for the first time. Playing in the Second League group East, they finished mid-table in their first season.

Trayal remained in the Second League East for three consecutive seasons until they were relegated in the 2001–02 season due to the reduction of the number of participating teams. The Trayal Corporation was privatized a few years later and the club fell back to obscurity.

Trayal's current rise started in 2016 when the club was taken over by Vladan Gašić, the son of the former Minister of Defence and the current director of the Security Intelligence Agency, Bratislav Gašić. The club took on from the half-season when they were near the bottom of the Rasina District First League (5th tier) with 18 points less than the first-ranked team Šanac. In the second part of the championship they recorded all 15 victories and in the end finished first with 3 points more than the closest competition. Between 2016 and 2018 they had three successive promotions and went from the 5th tier to the 2nd tier again.

They compete in the 2nd tier since 2018–19 Serbian First League.

== Honours ==
Serbian League East (III)

- 2017–18

Zone League West (IV)

- 2016–17

Rasina District First League (V)

- 2012–13, 2015–16

== Seasons ==
Season	League									Cup
Season	Division	P	W	D	L	F	A	Pts	Pos	Cup
2015–16	5 – Rasina District First League	30	20	0	10	83	42	60	1st	—
2016–17	4 – Zone League West	30	24	3	3	96	21	75	1st	—
2017–18	3 – Serbian League East	30	19	9	2	53	19	66	1st	—
2018–19	2 – Serbian First League	37	15	7	15	38	40	32	9th	Preliminary round
2019–20	2 – Serbian First League	30 (Note: The season was shortened due to the COVID-19 pandemic in Serbia.)	7	10	13	21	30	31	13th	Round of 32
2020–21	2 – Serbian First League	34	9	8	17	31	44	35	15th	Round of 32
2021–22	3 – Serbian League East	28	20	8	0	42	9	68	1st	Round of 32
2022–23	2 – Serbian First League	30	9	8	13	29	37	35	13th	—
2023–24	3 – Serbian League East	30	30	0	0	82	16	90	1st	Round of 32
2024–25	2 – Serbian First League	30	8	7	15	30	39	28 (Note: 3 point deducted)	14th	—
2025–26	2 – Serbian First League								—	

== Players ==
=== Current squad ===
As of 29 September 2025

Note: Flags indicate national team as defined under FIFA eligibility rules; some limited exceptions apply. Players may hold more than one non-FIFA nationality.

No.	Pos.	Nation	Player
1	GK	SRB	Aleksandar Simić
3	FW	SRB	Đorđe Kotlajić (on loan from Napredak Kruševac)
4	DF	SRB	Nikola Marinković (on loan from Napredak Kruševac)
5	DF	SRB	Veljko Đokić
6	MF	JPN	Yu Horike
7	DF	SRB	Ilija Matejević
8	MF	SRB	Marko Stanojević (captain)
9	FW	JPN	Ayumu Nishimura
10	FW	SRB	Filip Đurović
11	MF	SRB	Lazar Nikolić
12	GK	SRB	Stefan Marković
13	DF	SRB	Vladimir Nedeljković
14	FW	UZB	Abubakir Muydinov
15	DF	SRB	Nikola Đorić

No.	Pos.	Nation	Player
18	FW	SRB	David Ivić (on loan from Železničar Pančevo)
19	MF	SRB	Bratislav Simić
20	FW	SRB	Vladimir Mijailović
21	MF	SRB	Predrag Medić
22	GK	SRB	Danilo Pavlović
23	DF	SRB	Vanja Đorđević (on loan from Partizan)
24	MF	SRB	Veljko Milenković
25	FW	SRB	Nikola Bogdanović
26	MF	SRB	Đorđe Popović
27	DF	SRB	Igor Cvetojević
29	FW	SRB	Danijel Ranđelov
30	MF	SRB	Bogdan Dunjić
31	DF	SRB	Dušan Punoševac

=== Out on loan ===
Note: Flags indicate national team as defined under FIFA eligibility rules; some limited exceptions apply. Players may hold more than one non-FIFA nationality.

No.	Pos.	Nation	Player
—	DF	SRB	Toplica Ćilerdžić (at FK Jedinstvo 1936 until the end of the season)
—	FW	SRB	Ognjen Milošević (at FK Jedinstvo 1936 until the end of the season)

=== Team management ===
Executive Board
President	(Serbia) Miloš Kocić
Honorary president	(Serbia) Vladan Gašić
General secretary	(Serbia) Nebojša Popović
Sporting director	(Serbia) Nemanja Milisavljević
Director of stadium	(Serbia) Radoslav Jeftović
Economic	(Serbia) Dragica Mihajlović (Serbia) Jasmina Radenković (Serbia) Igor Petrović
Digital marketing	(Serbia) Dušan Zdravić
PR manager	(Serbia) Vesna Vujčić
First Team Staff
Head coach	(Serbia) Bojan Miladinović
Assistant coach	(Serbia) Bojan Marjanović (Serbia) Predrag Pavlović
Goalkeeper coach	(Serbia) Filip Anđelković
Physiotherapist	(Serbia) Miloš Mihajlović (Serbia) Marija Stevanović (Serbia) Mihailo Petković (Serbia) Dinko Rakić (Serbia) Jelena Jevtić
Coach	(Serbia) Mirko Milutinović
Doctor	(Serbia) Marko Petković (Serbia) Filip Petrović (Serbia) Stevan Inić

== Historical list of coaches ==
- (Serbia) Miljojko Gošić (1 July 2017-4 September 2018)
- (Serbia) Goran Lazarević (4 September 2018-10 September 20190
- (Serbia) Predrag Pešić (11 September 2019-24 October 2019)
- (Serbia) Nenad Sakić (1 November 2019-30 June 2020)
- (Serbia) Dragan Tadić (interim) (1 July 2020-14 August 2020)
- (Serbia) Goran Lazarević (14 August 2020-30 June 2021)
- (Serbia) Miljojko Gošić (21 July 2021-30 Jun 2023)
- (Serbia) Ivica Momčilović (13 July 2023-6 August 2024)
- (Serbia) Dejan Branković (6 August 2024-)
