= 2020–21 OFK Bačka season =

OFK Bačka
2020–21 season
- Chairman: Marjan Rnić
- Manager: Nenad Vanić
- Stadium: Slavko Maletin Vava Stadium
- Serbian Cup: Round of 32
Home colours	Away colours

OFK Bačka are a Serbian football club based in Bačka Palanka. The 2020–21 campaign will be the club's 75th season since the club were formed. During this season the club will have competed in the following competitions: Serbian SuperLiga, Serbian Cup.

== Players ==
=== Current squad ===
As of 29 December 2020

Note: Flags indicate national team as defined under FIFA eligibility rules; some limited exceptions apply. Players may hold more than one non-FIFA nationality.

No.	Pos.	Nation	Player
1	GK	SRB	Aleksa Milojević
2	DF	SRB	Dejan Parađina
6	DF	USA	Danilo Radjen
8	MF	SRB	Marko Pantić
9	FW	SRB	Stefan Ilić
14	DF	SRB	Slađan Mijatović
15	DF	SRB	Marko Klisura
16	FW	SRB	Nikola Njamčulović
18	FW	SRB	Luka Ratković
19	FW	CRO	Luka Pisačić
20	FW	SRB	Miloš Zličić
21	DF	SRB	Stefan Jovanović (captain)

No.	Pos.	Nation	Player
22	DF	SRB	Danilo Aleksić
23	MF	SRB	Nikola Žakula
25	FW	SRB	Slobodan Babić
26	MF	BIH	Nikola Eskić
29	MF	SRB	Marko Stojanović
30	DF	SRB	Nemanja Zdravković
31	MF	SRB	Rista Pajkanović
32	MF	SRB	Nemanja Trifunović
34	DF	SRB	Strahinja Proković
35	MF	SRB	Miljan Marinković
99	GK	SRB	Đurađ Krndija

=== Players with multiple nationalities ===
- (Bosnia and Herzegovina) (Serbia) Nikola Eskić
- (United States) (Serbia) Danilo Radjen

== Competitions ==
=== Friendlies ===
11 July 2020 Friendly	OFK Bačka	1–1	TSC	Bačka Palanka
20:00		Report		Stadium: Slavko Maletin Vava Stadium

25 July 2020 Friendly	OFK Bačka	1–3	Inđija	Golubinci
16:00		Report		Stadium: Stadion FK Golubinci

10 October 2020 Friendly	Spartak Subotica	3–0	OFK Bačka
16:30

17 January 2021 Friendly	Opatija (Croatia)	1–3	OFK Bačka	Pula
15:30		Report		Stadium: Stadion Tivoli

20 January 2021 Friendly	Koper (Slovenia)	1–1	OFK Bačka
15:30		Report

23 January 2021 Friendly	Olimpija (Slovenia)	2–0	OFK Bačka	Poreč
16:00		Report		Stadium: Stadion Veli Jože

30 January 2021 Friendly	OFK Bačka	0–1	Kabel	Bačka Palanka
15:00		Report		Stadium: Slavko Maletin Vava Stadium

=== Serbian Super Liga ===
==== Results summary ====
Overall								Home						Away					
Pld	W	D	L	GF	GA	GD	Pts	W	D	L	GF	GA	GD	W	D	L	GF	GA	GD
38	3	7	28	24	68	−44	16	3	4	12	16	33	−17	0	3	16	8	35	−27

Last updated: 19 May 2021.
Source: Soccerway

===== Results by round =====
Round	1	2	3	4	5	6	7	8	9	10	11	12	13	14	15	16	17	18	19	20	21	22	23	24	25	26	27	28	29	30	31	32	33	34	35	36	37	38
Ground	A	H	A	H	A	H	A	H	A	H	A	H	A	H	A	A	H	A	H	H	A	H	A	H	A	H	A	H	A	H	A	H	A	H	H	A	H	A
Result	L	L	D	D	L	W	L	D	L	D	L	L	L	L	L	D	W	L	L	W	L	L	L	L	L	D	L	L	D	L	L	L	L	L	L	L	L	L
Position	20	20	20	20	20	20	20	20	20	20	20	20	20	20	20	20	20	20	20	20	20	20	20	20	20	20	20	20	20	20	20	20	20	20	20	20	20	20

Updated to match(es) played on 19 May 2021. Source: Soccerway
A = Away; H = Home; W = Win; D = Draw; L = Loss

==== Matches ====
1 August 2020 1	Mačva Šabac	1–0	OFK Bačka	Šabac
19:30 CET	Nikola Milinković (yellow card) 1'; Lazar Ivić (yellow card) 20'; Božić 56'; Igor Ristivojević (yellow card) 59'; Pejović (yellow card) 84'	Report	Milenko Škorić (yellow card) 25'; Mijatović (yellow card) 53'; Jovanović (yellow card) 90'	Stadium: Gradski stadion Šabac; Attendance: 0 Referee: (Serbia) Nenad Minaković
Note: Played Behind Closed Doors

5 August 2020 2	OFK Bačka	1–3	Spartak Subotica	Bačka Palanka
19:00 CET	Žakula 38'; Milenko Škorić (yellow card) 72'; Pantić (yellow card) 90'	Report	Tufegdžić 2' 36' 76'; David Dunđerski (yellow card) 29'; Srećković (yellow card) 51'; Ivančević (yellow card) 57'	Stadium: Slavko Maletin Vava Stadium; Attendance: 0 Referee: (Serbia) Đorđe Maksimović
Note: Played Behind Closed Doors

9 August 2020 3	Proleter Novi Sad	1–1	OFK Bačka	Novi Sad
20:30 CET	Knežević 77' (pen.); Ilić (yellow card) 82'	Report	Pantić (yellow card) 25'; Velemir (yellow card) 39'; Jovanović (yellow card) 66'; Krčmarević 90' (pen.)	Stadium: Stadion Slana Bara; Attendance: 0 Referee: (Serbia) Novica Anđelovski
Note: Played Behind Closed Doors

16 August 2020 4	OFK Bačka	1–1	TSC	Bačka Palanka
18:00 CET	Milenko Škorić (yellow card) 35'; Žakula 51' (yellow card) 55'; Krsta Đorđević (yellow card) 72'; Nikola Krčmarević (yellow card) 75'	Report	Lukić 42' (pen.); Petrović (yellow card) 64'; Tomanović (yellow card) 90'	Stadium: Slavko Maletin Vava Stadium; Attendance: 0 Referee: (Serbia) Miloš Milanović
Note: Played Behind Closed Doors

22 August 2020 5	Čukarički	1–0	OFK Bačka	Belgrade
19:00 CET	N'Diaye (yellow card) 33'; Ostojić (yellow card) 55'; Kovač (red card) 58'; Kajević 76'; Petrović (yellow card) 90'	Report	Klisura (yellow card) 36'; Velemir (yellow card) 58'; Mijatović (yellow card) 80'	Stadium: Stadion na Banovom brdu Attendance: 0 Referee: (Serbia) Milan Mitić
Note: Played Behind Closed Doors

29 August 2020 6	OFK Bačka	2–1	Voždovac	Bačka Palanka
19:30 CET	Žakula 2' 8' (yellow card) 42'; Eskić (yellow card) 45'; Velemir (yellow card) 63'; Jovanović (yellow card) 82'	Report	Živković 10'; Vujnović (yellow card) 18'; Putinčanin (yellow card) 32'; Gajić (yellow card) 90'	Stadium: Slavko Maletin Vava Stadium; Attendance: 0 Referee: (Serbia) Bojan Nikolić
Note: Played Behind Closed Doors

13 September 2020 7	Mladost Lučani	2–1	OFK Bačka	Lučani
18:00 CET	Krajišnik (yellow card) 10'; Šatara 27'; Regis (yellow card) 71'; Bojović 88' (pen.); Milošević (yellow card) 90+3'	Report	Zličić 17'; Jovanović (yellow card) 35'; Klisura (yellow card) 50'; Đorđević (yellow card) 60'; Luka Ratković (yellow card) 87'	Stadium: Mladost Stadium; Attendance: 0 Referee: (Serbia) Milan Ilić
Note: Played Behind Closed Doors

19 September 2020 8	OFK Bačka	0–0	Napredak	Bačka Palanka
16:00 CET	Velemir (yellow card) 3'; Klisura (yellow card) 20'; Dejan Parađina (yellow card) 47' (yellow-red card) 71'; Žakula (yellow card) 83'; Mladen Veselinović (yellow card) 87'	Report	Todorović (yellow card) 37'; Uroš Rašković (yellow card) 86'	Stadium: Slavko Maletin Vava Stadium; Attendance: 0 Referee: (Serbia) Danilo Grujić
Note: Played Behind Closed Doors

28 September 2020 9	Partizan	2–1	OFK Bačka	Belgrade
18:00 CET	Sadiq 50'; Tomović 61' (o.g.)	Report	Krsta Đorđević 78'	Stadium: Partizan Stadium; Attendance: 0 Referee: (Serbia) Nenad Minaković
Note: Played Behind Closed Doors

3 October 2020 10	OFK Bačka	2–2	Javor Ivanjica	Bačka Palanka
16:00 CET	Pisačić 61'; Pantić 74' (yellow card) 78'	Report	Luković 14'; Jevremović 27'; Nikolić (yellow card) 39'; Mladenović (yellow card) 81'	Stadium: Slavko Maletin Vava Stadium; Attendance: 0 Referee: (Serbia) Jovan Šegrt
Note: Played Behind Closed Doors

16 October 2020 11	Radnik Surdulica	1–0	OFK Bačka	Surdulica
18:00 CET	Makarić 8' (pen.); Kostić (yellow card) 88'; Mitošević (yellow card) 90+1'	Report	Milenko Škorić (yellow card) 76'; Jovanović (yellow card) 90+2'	Stadium: Surdulica City Stadium; Attendance: 0 Referee: (Serbia) Bojan Nikolić
Note: Played Behind Closed Doors

25 October 2020 12	OFK Bačka	1–2	Inđija	Bačka Palanka
14:00 CET	Tomović (yellow card) 13'; Stojanović (yellow card) 17'; Eskić (yellow card) 37'; Zličić 42'; Jovanović (yellow card) 66'	Report	Nešković (yellow card) 16' (goal) 33'; Mihajlov (yellow card) 53'; Nemanja Obradović 67'; Cucin (yellow card) 81'; Jovičić (yellow card) 85'	Stadium: Slavko Maletin Vava Stadium; Attendance: 0 Referee: (Serbia) Novak Simović
Note: Played Behind Closed Doors

30 October 2020 13	Vojvodina	3–1	OFK Bačka	Novi Sad
18:00 CET	Zukić 26'; Bojić 40'; Bjeković (yellow card) 54'; Vukadinović 61'	Report	Nemanja Zdravković (yellow card) 81'; Krčmarević 82'	Stadium: Karađorđe Stadium; Attendance: 0 Referee: (Serbia) Zoran Široki
Note: Played Behind Closed Doors

7 November 2020 14	OFK Bačka	0–1	Rad	Bačka Palanka
14:00 CET	Pantić (yellow card) 37'; Velemir (yellow card) 48'; Žakula (yellow card) 69'	Report	Novaković 22' (yellow card) 23'; Busnić (yellow card) 51'; Kahriman (yellow card) 79'; Lazarević (yellow card) 90+3'	Stadium: Slavko Maletin Vava Stadium; Attendance: 0 Referee: (Serbia) Dragan Čolović
Note: Played Behind Closed Doors

22 November 2020 15	Zlatibor Čajetina	1–0	OFK Bačka	Užice
16:00 CET	Uroš Miiloradović (yellow card) 41'; Adnan Isalmović 45+1'	Report	Milenko Škorić (yellow card) 44'; Pisačić (yellow card) 65'; Dejan Parađina (yellow card) 68'; Nemanja Zdravković (yellow card) 78'	Stadium: Užice City Stadium; Attendance: 0 Referee: (Serbia) Jovan Šegrt
Note: Played Behind Closed Doors

29 November 2020 16	Novi Pazar	0–0	OFK Bačka	Novi Pazar
15:00 CET	Tomić (yellow card) 26'; Nikola Nedeljković (yellow card) 81'; Trtovac (yellow card) 90+3'	Report	Luka Ratković (yellow card) 69'; Dejan Parađina (yellow card) 75'	Stadium: Novi Pazar City Stadium; Attendance: 0 Referee: (Serbia) Momčilo Marković
Note: COVID-19 pandemic in Serbia

7 December 2020 17	OFK Bačka	3–1	Metalac GM	Bačka Palanka
13:00 CET	Žakula 38' (yellow card) 43'; Velemir 53' (pen.); Luka Ratković 60'; Jovanović (yellow card) 77'	Report	Maksimović 14'; Vlalukin (yellow card) 43'; Zoćević (yellow card) 52'	Stadium: Slavko Maletin Vava Stadium; Attendance: 0 Referee: (Serbia) Milan Ilić
Note: COVID-19 pandemic in Serbia

13 December 2020 18	Crvena zvezda	2–0	OFK Bačka	Belgrade
17:00 CET	Ivanić 46'; Falcinelli 56'	Report		Stadium: Rajko Mitić Stadium; Attendance: 0 Referee: (Serbia) Dragan Čolović
Note: COVID-19 pandemic in Serbia

16 December 2020 19	OFK Bačka	1–2	Radnički Niš	Bačka Palanka
14:00 CET	Luka Ratković (yellow card) 56' (goal) 63'	Report	Đuranović 4'; Aksentijević (yellow card) 68'; Pantelić (yellow card) 88'; Kojić (yellow card) 90' (goal) 90+1'	Stadium: Slavko Maletin Vava Stadium; Attendance: 0 Referee: (Serbia) Jovan Šegrt
Note: COVID-19 pandemic in Serbia

7 February 2021 20	OFK Bačka	2–0	Mačva Šabac	Bačka Palanka
15:00 CET	Luka Ratković 16'; Jovanović (yellow card) 34'; Zličić 58'	Report		Stadium: Slavko Maletin Vava Stadium; Attendance: 0 Referee: (Serbia) Aleksandar Živković
Note: COVID-19 pandemic in Serbia

12 February 2021 21	Spartak Subotica	1–0	OFK Bačka	Subotica
14:30 CET	Nikola Furtula 40'; Shimura (yellow card) 55'; Vidović (yellow card) 90+2'	Report	Kazačoks (yellow card) 31'; Mijatović (yellow card) 47'; Mitrović (yellow card) 89'	Stadium: Subotica City Stadium; Attendance: 0 Referee: (Serbia) Đorđe Maksimović
Note: COVID-19 pandemic in Serbia

17 February 2021 22	OFK Bačka	0–2	Proleter Novi Sad	Bačka Palanka
16:00 CET	Mijatović (yellow card) 62'; Ivančević (yellow card) 87'	Report	Kojić (yellow card) 16'; Stefan Tomović 20'; Milošević (yellow card) 36'; Bojan Kovačević (yellow card) 38'; Mirosavljev 89'	Stadium: Slavko Maletin Vava Stadium; Attendance: 0 Referee: (Serbia) Milan Ilić
Note: COVID-19 pandemic in Serbia

22 February 2021 23	TSC	3–0	OFK Bačka	Senta
15:00 CET	Stanojev 18'; Tomanović (yellow card) 38'; Zec 40' 41'	Report	Pisačić (yellow card) 29'	Stadium: Stadion Senta; Attendance: 0 Referee: (Serbia) Danilo Grujić
Note: COVID-19 pandemic in Serbia

27 February 2021 24	OFK Bačka	1–2	Čukarički	Bačka Palanka
14:00 CET	Ašćerić 53'; Luka Ratković (yellow card) 87'; Svārups (yellow card) 90+1'; Nikola Nedeljković (yellow card) 90+3'	Report	Birmančević (yellow card) 57' (goal) 72'; Marko Rakonjac (yellow card) 81'; Šapić 85'	Stadium: Slavko Maletin Vava Stadium; Attendance: 0 Referee: (Serbia) Milan Mitić
Note: COVID-19 pandemic in Serbia

3 March 2021 25	Voždovac	2–1	OFK Bačka	Belgrade
14:00 CET	Arsić 64' (pen.) 68'; Gajić (yellow card) 85'; Stefan Purtić (yellow card) 90'	Report	Nemanja Zdravković (yellow card) 1'; Žakula (yellow card) 20'; Dejan Parađina 45+2'; Nikola Nedeljković (yellow card) 85'; Eskić (yellow card) 87'	Stadium: Voždovac Stadium; Attendance: 0 Referee: (Serbia) Đorđe Maksimović
Note: COVID-19 pandemic in Serbia

8 March 2021 26	OFK Bačka	1–1	Mladost Lučani	Bačka Palanka
16:00 CET	Svārups (yellow card) 13'; Luka Ratković (yellow card) 21'; Žakula 41'; Nemanja Zdravković (yellow card) 58'; Jovanović (yellow card) 89'	Report	Šatara 63'; Leković (yellow card) 67'; Obeng (yellow card) 90+2'	Stadium: Slavko Maletin Vava Stadium; Attendance: 0 Referee: (Serbia) Pavle Tomić
Note: COVID-19 pandemic in Serbia

14 March 2021 27	Napredak	2–1	OFK Bačka	Kruševac
13:00 CET	Marjanović 2'; Tomić (yellow card) 53'; Melunović 61'; Milovanović (yellow card) 73'	Report	Ašćerić 74' (pen.); Žakula (yellow card) 90+1'	Stadium: Mladost Stadium; Attendance: 0 Referee: (Serbia) Srđan Jovanović (referee)
Note: COVID-19 pandemic in Serbia

20 March 2021 28	OFK Bačka	0–4	Partizan	Bačka Palanka
15:00 CET	Marko Stojanović (yellow card) 21'; Svārups (yellow card) 76'; Pantić (yellow card) 80'; Žakula (yellow card) 85'	Report	Vujačić 44' (yellow card) 44'; Marković (yellow card) 57' (goal) 62'; Asano 58'; Jović 88'	Stadium: Slavko Maletin Vava Stadium; Attendance: 0 Referee: (Serbia) Miloš Djordjić
Note: COVID-19 pandemic in Serbia

3 April 2021 29	Javor Ivanjica	1–1	OFK Bačka	Ivanjica
14:55 CET	Doucouré (yellow card) 39'; Balabanović (yellow card) 49'; Filip Pavišić (yellow card) 53'; Luković 76' (pen.)	Report	Pantić 4'; Luka Ratković (yellow card) 43'; Dušan Zivić (yellow card) 60'; Milojević (yellow card) 70'; Eskić (yellow card) 79'	Stadium: Ivanjica Stadium; Attendance: 0 Referee: (Serbia) Lazar Lukić
Note: COVID-19 pandemic in Serbia

7 April 2021 30	OFK Bačka	0–2	Radnik Surdulica	Bačka Palanka
14:00 CET		Report	Uroš Stojanović (yellow card) 24'; Nikola Bogdanovski 36'; Ranko Jokić (yellow card) 60'; Marko Stojanović 89' (o.g.)	Stadium: Slavko Maletin Vava Stadium; Attendance: 0 Referee: (Serbia) Momčilo Marković
Note: COVID-19 pandemic in Serbia

12 April 2021 31	Inđija	1–0	OFK Bačka	Inđija
16:00 CET	Vasilije Bakić (yellow card) 2'; Dimitrov 21'; Modou Jobe (yellow card) 89'	Report	Luka Ratković (yellow card) 54'	Stadium: Inđija Stadium; Attendance: 0 Referee: (Serbia) Srđan Jovanović (referee)
Note: COVID-19 pandemic in Serbia

=== Serbian Cup ===
21 October 2020 Round of 32	Partizan	2–0	OFK Bačka	Belgrade
16:00	Pavlović 7' (yellow card) 53'; Dennis Stojković (yellow card) 44'; Obradović (yellow card) 72'; Asano 75'	Report	Radjen (yellow card) 12'; Krsta Djordjević (yellow card) 90+3'	Stadium: Partizan Stadium; Attendance: 0 Referee: (Serbia) Nenad Minaković
Note: Played Behind Closed Doors
