= 2020–21 Serbian SuperLiga =

15th season of Serbian SuperLiga

SuperLiga
- Season: 2020–21
- Dates: 31 July 2020 – 19 May 2021;
- Champions: Red Star Belgrade; 7th SuperLiga title 32nd domestic title
- Relegated: Javor; Rad; Bačka; Inđija; Mačva; Zlatibor
- Champions League: Red Star Belgrade
- Europa Conference League: Čukarički; Partizan; Vojvodina
- Matches: 380
- Goals: 1,024 (2.69 per match)
- Top goalscorer: Milan Makarić (25 goals)
- Biggest home win: TSC 7–0 Novi Pazar
- Biggest away win: Inđija 0–6 Partizan
- Highest scoring: Rad 7–1 Mačva
- Longest winning run: Red Star Belgrade 22 games
- Longest unbeaten run: Red Star Belgrade 38 games
- Longest winless run: OFK Bačka 18 games
- Longest losing run: OFK Bačka 9 games
- All statistics correct as of 16:17, 19 May 2021 (UTC).

The 2020–21 Serbian SuperLiga (known as the Linglong Tire SuperLiga for sponsorship reasons) was the fifteenth of the Serbian SuperLiga. Red Star were the defending champions from the previous season.

Due to the COVID-19 pandemic in the 2019–20 Serbian SuperLiga season, no club has been relegated to the Serbian First League, and four clubs from the 2019–20 Serbian First League were promoted to the 2020–21 Serbian SuperLiga.

== Teams ==
Locations of the 2020–21 Serbian SuperLiga teams
Locations of the 2020–21 Serbian SuperLiga teams on the territory of Belgrade

The league consisted of 20 teams: sixteen teams from the 2019–20 Serbian SuperLiga and four new teams from the 2019–20 Serbian First League, Zlatibor Čajetina who are making their debut in top tier, Metalac Gornji Milanovac who are returning after a 3-year absence from top tier, OFK Bačka who are making a immediate return to top tier and Novi Pazar who also are returning to top tier after a 3-year absence.

=== Venues ===
Club	City	Stadium	Capacity
Bačka	Bačka Palanka	Slavko Maletin Vava Stadium	4,000
Čukarički	Belgrade	Čukarički Stadium	4,070
Inđija	Inđija	Inđija Stadium	4,500
Javor-Matis	Ivanjica	Ivanjica Stadium	3,000
Mačva	Šabac	Mačva Stadium	5,494
Metalac	Gornji Milanovac	Metalac Stadium	4,400
Mladost	Lučani	Mladost Stadium	5,944
Napredak	Kruševac	Mladost Stadium	10,331
Novi Pazar	Novi Pazar	Novi Pazar City Stadium	13,000
Partizan	Belgrade	Partizan Stadium	29,775
Proleter	Novi Sad	Karađorđe Stadium	14,458
Rad	Belgrade	King Peter I Stadium	3,919
Radnički	Niš	Čair Stadium	18,151
Radnik	Surdulica	Surdulica City Stadium	3,312
Red Star	Belgrade	Rajko Mitić Stadium	51,755
Spartak	Subotica	City Stadium	13,000
TSC	Bačka Topola	Stadion Senta	5,000
Vojvodina	Novi Sad	Karađorđe Stadium	14,458
Voždovac	Belgrade	Shopping Center Stadium	5,175
Zlatibor	Čajetina	Užice City Stadium	15,000

=== Personnel, Kits and General sponsor ===
Note: Flags indicate national team as has been defined under FIFA eligibility rules. Players and Managers may hold more than one non-FIFA nationality.

Team	Head coach	Captain	Kit manufacturer	General Sponsor
Bačka	(Serbia) Nenad Vanić	(Serbia) Stefan Jovanović	Joma	AD Podunavlje
Čukarički	(Serbia) Dušan Đorđević	(Serbia) Marko Docić	Adidas	ADOC
Inđija	(Serbia) Dejan Čelar	(Serbia) Brana Ilić	Adidas	Mitsubishi
Javor-Matis	(Serbia) Igor Bondžulić	(Serbia) Nedeljko Piščević	Miteks	Matis Group
Mačva	(Serbia) Dragan Aničić	(Serbia) Filip Pejović	NAAI	Municipality of Šabac
Metalac	(Serbia) Žarko Lazetić	(Serbia) Miloš Vranjanin	NAAI	Metalac AD
Mladost	(Serbia) Nenad Milovanović (caretaker)	(Serbia) Ivan Milošević	Miteks	Milan Blagojević - Namenska
Napredak	(Serbia) Goran Stevanović	(Serbia) Jovan Markoski	Givova	Delta Holding
Novi Pazar	(Serbia) Kenan Kolašinac	(Serbia) Admir Kecap	Nike	Municipality of Novi Pazar
Partizan	(Serbia) Aleksandar Stanojević	(Serbia) Vladimir Stojković	Nike	mt:s
Proleter	(Serbia) Branko Žigić	(Serbia) Siniša Babić	NAAI	Novi Sad - Gas
Rad	(Serbia) Milan Milanović	(Serbia) Branislav Milošević	NAAI	mt:s
Radnički	(Serbia) Vladimir Gaćinović	(Serbia) Borivoje Ristić	Macron	mt:s
Radnik	(Serbia) Slavoljub Đorđević	(Serbia) Dušan Stevanović	Jako	mt:s
Red Star Belgrade	(Serbia) Dejan Stanković	(Canada) Milan Borjan	Macron	Gazprom
Spartak	(Serbia) Vladimir Buač	(Serbia) Stefan Milošević	Legea	Vinarija Čoka
TSC	(Serbia) Mladen Krstajić	(Serbia) Saša Tomanović	Adidas	SAT-TRAKT
Vojvodina	(Serbia) Nenad Lalatović	(Montenegro) Nikola Drinčić	Kelme	Srbijagas
Voždovac	(Serbia) Jovan Damjanović	(Serbia) Jovan Nišić	Adidas	Stadion SC
Zlatibor	(Serbia) Zoran Njeguš	(Serbia) Rade Glišović	NAAI	Galens

Nike is the official ball supplier for Serbian SuperLiga.

Kelme is the official sponsor of the Referee's Committee of the Football Association of Serbia.

=== Managerial changes ===
Team	Outgoing manager	Manner of departure	Date of vacancy	Position in table	Incoming manager	Date of appointment
Radnik	(Bosnia and Herzegovina) Simo Krunić	Sacked	26 August 2020	15th	(Serbia) Slavoljub Đorđević	1 September 2020
Partizan	(Serbia) Savo Milošević	Resigned	1 September 2020	5th	(Serbia) Aleksandar Stanojević	1 September 2020
Rad	(Serbia) Branko Mirjačić	Resigned	2 September 2020	19th	(Serbia) Zoran Njeguš	2 September 2020
Čukarički	(Serbia) Aleksandar Veselinović	Signed by Al Dhafra	17 September 2020	6th	(Serbia) Dušan Đorđević	17 September 2020
Mladost	(Serbia) Goran Stanić	Signed by Al Dhafra	22 September 2020	6th	(Serbia) Nenad Milovanović (caretaker)	22 September 2020
Napredak	(Serbia) Dragan Ivanović	Resigned	28 September 2020	19th	(Serbia) Ivan Babić (caretaker)	28 September 2020
Inđija	(Serbia) Bratislav Živković	Resigned	30 September 2020	14th	(Serbia) Dejan Čelar	7 October 2020
Napredak	(Serbia) Ivan Babić (caretaker)	End of caretaker spell	5 October 2020	19th	(Serbia) Goran Stevanović	5 October 2020
Radnički	(Montenegro) Radoslav Batak	Sacked	7 October 2020	7th	(Serbia) Milan Đuričić	7 October 2020
Rad	(Serbia) Zoran Njeguš	Resigned	8 October 2020	15th	(Serbia) Milan Milanović	8 October 2020
Radnički	(Serbia) Milan Đuričić	Resigned	26 November 2020	10th	(Serbia) Vladimir Gaćinović	27 November 2020
TSC	(Serbia) Zoltan Sabo	Death	15 December 2020	12th	(Serbia) Mladen Krstajić	4 January 2021

=== Foreign players ===
- Foreign players: there are no restrictions on a number of signed foreign players, but clubs can only register up to four foreign players for a single match-day squad.

Team	Player 1	Player 2	Player 3	Player 4	Player 5	Player 6	Player 7	Naturalized Players
Bačka	(Croatia) Luka Pisačić	(Japan) Ryohei Miyazaki	(Latvia) Jevgēņijs Kazačoks	(Latvia) Kaspars Svārups	(Montenegro) Filip Mitrović			(United States) → (Serbia) Danilo Radjen
Čukarički	(Bosnia and Herzegovina) Andrej Bosnić	(Bosnia and Herzegovina) Milan Savić	(Montenegro) Asmir Kajević	(Montenegro) Marko Rakonjac				(Bosnia and Herzegovina) → (Serbia) Stefan Kovač
Inđija	(Cameroon) (France) Daniel Kamy	(The Gambia) Modou Jobe	(Montenegro) Milisav Perošević	(Russia) Daniil Chalov				
Javor Matis	(France) (Mali) Boubacari Doucouré	(Ghana) Ibrahim Tanko	(Montenegro) Alija Krnić					(Montenegro) → (Serbia) Stefan Vico
Mačva	(Colombia) Dilan Ortiz	(Croatia) Mario Nikolić	(Slovenia) Omar Kočar	(Slovenia) Vanja Panić				(Slovenia) → (Serbia) Sandro Zukić
Metalac	(Bosnia and Herzegovina) Ljubiša Pecelj	(China) Dong Li	(Republic of the Congo) Prestige Mboungou					(Switzerland) → (Serbia) Nikola Sukacev
Mladost	(Cameroon) Regis Baha	(Ghana) Obeng Regan						(Bosnia and Herzegovina) → (Serbia) Petar Jovanović (Montenegro) → (Serbia) Maksim Milović (Nigeria) → (Serbia) Obiora Odita (Bosnia and Herzegovina) → (Serbia) Miloš Šatara
Napredak	(Montenegro) Mitar Ćuković							(Montenegro) → (Serbia) Igor Zonjić
Novi Pazar	(Bosnia and Herzegovina) Almir Aganspahić	(Bosnia and Herzegovina) Nemanja Dragutinović	(Guinea) Abdoulaye Cissé					(Montenegro) → (Serbia) Bojica Nikčević (Montenegro) → (Serbia) Periša Pešukić
Partizan	(Cameroon) Macky Bagnack	(France) (Cameroon) Jean-Christophe Bahebeck	(Guinea) Seydouba Soumah	(Israel) Bibras Natcho	(Japan) Takuma Asano			(Hungary) → (Serbia) Filip Holender (Bosnia and Herzegovina) → (Serbia) Nemanja Jović (Montenegro) → (Serbia) Aleksandar Šćekić (Montenegro) → (Serbia) Igor Vujačić
Proleter	(Brazil) Leandro Pinto	(Montenegro) Nikola Gluščević						(Bosnia and Herzegovina) → (Serbia) Jovan Ilić
Rad	(Montenegro) Savo Gazivoda	(Montenegro) Ilija Tučević						
Radnički								(Montenegro) → (Serbia) Filip Kasalica
Radnik	(Bosnia and Herzegovina) Edin Biber	(Indonesia) Witan Sulaeman	(North Macedonia) Zoran Danoski					(North Macedonia) → (Serbia) Nikola Bogdanovski
Red Star	(Comoros) (France) El Fardou Ben	(Ivory Coast) Sékou Sanogo	(France) (Ivory Coast) Axel Bakayoko	(Gabon) Guélor Kanga	(Italy) Diego Falcinelli	(Italy) Filippo Falco	(Kenya) Richard Odada	(Canada) → (Serbia) Milan Borjan (Australia) → (Serbia) Miloš Degenek (Montenegro) → (Serbia) Mirko Ivanić (Montenegro) → (Serbia) Nikola Krstović
Spartak	(Bosnia and Herzegovina) (Croatia) Filip Dujmović	(Japan) Noboru Shimura	(Montenegro) (Denmark) Andrija Rajović	(Montenegro) Nikša Vujanović				(Montenegro) → (Serbia) Mišo Dubljanić
TSC								(Montenegro) → (Serbia) Slavko Damjanović (Bosnia and Herzegovina) → (Serbia) Stefan Santrač (Montenegro) → (Serbia) Janko Tumbasević
Vojvodina	(Bosnia and Herzegovina) Momčilo Mrkaić	(Croatia) Slavko Bralić						(Montenegro) → (Serbia) Nikola Drinčić (Bosnia and Herzegovina) → (Serbia) Siniša Saničanin
Voždovac	(Ghana) Abdul Rashid Obuobi	(Lithuania) Justas Lasickas	(Montenegro) Miloš Milović	(Montenegro) Nikola Vujnović	(Russia) Georgiy Bratukhin			(Greece) → (Serbia) Nemanja Milojević
Zlatibor	(Austria) (Croatia) Daniel Sudar	(Bosnia and Herzegovina) Ismar Hairlahović	(Bosnia and Herzegovina) (Netherlands) Marko Maletić	(Brazil) Eliomar	(North Macedonia) Matej Nikolov	(Russia) (Abkhazia) Shabat Logua		(Montenegro) → (Serbia) Danilo Dašić

== Transfers ==
For the list of transfers involving SuperLiga clubs during 2020–21 season, please see: List of Serbian football transfers summer 2020.

== League table ==
Pos	Team	Pld	W	D	L	GF	GA	GD	Pts	Qualification or relegation
1	Red Star Belgrade (C)	38	35	3	0	114	20	+94	108	Qualification for the Champions League second qualifying round
2	Partizan	38	31	2	5	95	20	+75	95	Qualification to Europa Conference League second qualifying round
3	Čukarički	38	22	8	8	69	34	+35	74	Qualification to Europa Conference League second qualifying round
4	Vojvodina	38	21	8	9	62	41	+21	71	Qualification to Europa Conference League second qualifying round
5	TSC	38	17	7	14	68	50	+18	58	
6	Radnik Surdulica	38	16	7	15	55	49	+6	55	
7	Mladost Lučani	38	15	9	14	43	59	−16	54	
8	Proleter Novi Sad	38	15	8	15	40	47	−7	53	
9	Metalac	38	13	13	12	48	53	−5	52	
10	Spartak Subotica	38	15	7	16	54	53	+1	52	
11	Napredak Kruševac	38	14	8	16	44	51	−7	50	
12	Novi Pazar	38	14	7	17	50	60	−10	49	
13	Radnički Niš	38	13	10	15	37	39	−2	49	
14	Voždovac	38	13	9	16	49	59	−10	48	
15	Rad (R)	38	14	6	18	44	57	−13	48	Relegation to Serbian First League
16	Javor-Matis (R)	38	12	10	16	45	53	−8	46	Relegation to Serbian First League
17	Inđija (R)	38	10	5	23	29	66	−37	35	Relegation to Serbian First League
18	Zlatibor (R)	38	7	8	23	28	64	−36	29	Relegation to Serbian First League
19	Mačva (R)	38	7	4	27	26	81	−55	25	Relegation to Serbian First League
20	Bačka (R)	38	3	7	28	24	68	−44	16	Relegation to Serbian First League

Source: SuperLiga (in Serbian), Soccerway
Rules for classification: 1) Points; 2) Head-to-head points; 3) Head-to-head goal difference; 4) Head-to-head goals scored; 5) Head-to-head away goals scored (if two teams tied); 6) Goal difference; 7) Goals scored; 8) Fair play ranking; 9) Draw.
(C) Champions; (R) Relegated

== Results ==
Home \ Away	BAČ	ČUK	INĐ	JAV	MAČ	MET	MLA	NAP	NPZ	PAR	PNS	RAD	RNI	RSU	RSB	SPA	VOJ	VOŽ	TSC	ZLA
Bačka		1–2	1–2	2–2	2–0	3–1	1–1	0–0	0–1	0–4	0–2	0–1	1–2	0–2	0–5	1–3	1–2	2–1	1–1	0–1
Čukarički	1–0		3–0	3–0	4–0	2–0	4–2	3–0	4–0	0–2	1–2	3–0	0–0	2–1	1–3	5–1	3–3	3–2	0–0	2–0
Inđija	1–0	0–1		3–2	2–2	0–1	1–0	1–0	1–0	0–6	0–5	1–0	1–0	0–1	1–5	3–4	0–2	0–1	0–3	1–0
Javor-Matis	1–1	1–2	1–1		2–0	1–3	4–1	3–0	1–0	0–1	1–1	1–1	1–0	2–1	1–5	1–3	2–1	3–1	1–2	1–1
Mačva Šabac	1–0	1–2	3–0	1–0		2–1	0–2	1–2	1–1	1–2	3–1	0–1	0–2	0–5	0–3	0–4	2–5	0–2	1–4	1–0
Metalac G.M.	3–0	0–0	0–0	1–2	2–1		1–1	2–2	1–1	1–1	1–1	3–0	1–1	1–1	0–1	3–0	3–3	2–1	0–0	2–0
Mladost Lučani	2–1	1–1	2–0	2–1	2–1	1–1		0–0	3–2	1–0	0–0	1–0	4–1	2–2	0–4	1–0	1–1	1–0	2–1	0–2
Napredak Kruševac	2–1	1–0	1–0	1–1	2–0	1–2	2–0		0–0	1–3	5–0	0–2	0–0	2–1	1–4	1–1	0–1	3–1	2–1	1–1
Novi Pazar	0–0	1–3	1–0	2–3	4–0	1–0	4–1	2–1		3–2	5–0	2–1	3–1	0–0	1–3	2–1	3–1	0–2	2–1	1–2
Partizan	2–1	1–0	5–0	4–0	2–0	3–0	4–0	3–0	4–1		1–0	3–0	2–0	3–0	1–1	2–1	2–0	3–0	3–1	5–1
Proleter Novi Sad	1–1	0–1	1–0	2–1	0–0	1–2	0–1	1–0	1–0	1–3		2–0	2–1	3–0	0–1	2–0	2–0	1–1	1–0	2–2
Rad	3–0	0–2	2–1	1–0	7–1	1–1	0–1	3–1	3–2	0–5	1–0		0–1	2–0	2–2	0–1	2–0	1–3	1–3	0–2
Radnički Niš	5–1	0–0	2–0	0–0	1–0	3–0	1–1	1–2	2–1	1–0	3–0	2–2		0–1	0–1	0–1	0–1	0–1	2–0	2–1
Radnik Surdulica	1–0	0–1	0–2	2–0	3–0	1–2	2–3	2–1	4–1	0–2	2–0	4–2	0–0		1–4	2–0	2–2	1–1	0–3	2–1
Red Star Belgrade	2–0	2–0	3–2	0–0	4–0	5–1	4–1	3–0	3–0	1–0	4–0	3–0	3–0	2–1		3–2	1–0	6–0	5–0	6–1
Spartak Subotica	1–0	4–2	1–0	0–2	3–2	4–1	1–0	0–2	1–1	1–2	1–2	1–1	2–0	0–0	1–2		0–1	3–0	2–2	3–0
Vojvodina	3–1	2–2	2–1	2–0	1–0	1–2	3–0	1–0	1–0	3–2	2–0	4–1	0–0	2–0	0–2	1–1		2–0	0–1	2–1
Voždovac	2–1	2–1	1–1	0–0	0–0	4–0	3–2	4–2	1–1	0–2	1–1	0–1	5–0	1–3	1–4	2–1	1–3		2–0	1–1
TSC	3–0	0–0	2–1	2–1	3–0	2–3	5–0	1–3	7–0	0–4	2–0	1–1	1–3	1–3	1–3	3–0	2–2	4–1		5–1
Zlatibor	1–0	1–5	2–2	0–2	0–1	1–0	1–0	1–2	0–1	0–1	0–2	1–2	0–0	1–4	0–1	1–1	0–2	0–0	0–1	

Source: (in Serbian)
Legend: Blue = home team win; Yellow = draw; Red = away team win.
For upcoming matches, an "a" indicates there is an article about the rivalry between the two participants.

== Individual statistics ==
=== Top scorers ===
As of matches played on 19 May 2021.

Pos	Scorer	Teams	Goals
1	(Serbia) Milan Makarić	Radnik	25
2	(Japan) Takuma Asano	Partizan	18
2	(Serbia) Milan Bojović	Mladost	18
2	(Serbia) Nenad Lukić	TSC	18
5	(Montenegro) Mirko Ivanić	Red Star	16
5	(Serbia) Luka Luković	Javor Matis	16
5	(Serbia) Lazar Tufegdžić	Spartak	16

=== Hat-tricks ===
Player	For	Against	Result	Date
(Serbia) Lazar Tufegdžić	Spartak	Bačka	3–1	5 August 2020
(Serbia) Aleksandar Katanić	Metalac	TSC	3–2	21 August 2020
(Japan) Takuma Asano	Partizan	Inđija	5–0	22 August 2020
(Serbia) Aleksandar Katai	Red Star	TSC	5–0	31 August 2020
(Serbia) Luka Marković	Novi Pazar	Vojvodina	3–0	3 October 2020
(Serbia) Milan Makarić	Radnik	Zlatibor	4–1	4 October 2020
(Serbia) Alen Melunović	Napredak	Proleter	5–0	24 April 2021
(Serbia) Milan Makarić	Radnik	Mačva	5–0	29 April 2021
(Serbia) Nenad Gavrić	Radnički Niš	Bačka	5–1	19 May 2021

=== Player of the week ===
As of matches played on 15 May 2021.

Round	Player	Club	Goals	Assists	Ref.
1	(Serbia) Viktor Živojinović	Proleter	2	0	
2	(Serbia) Lazar Tufegdžić	Spartak	3	0	
3	(Serbia) Marko Docić	Čukarički	2	1	
4	(Bosnia and Herzegovina) Siniša Saničanin	Vojvodina	1	0	
5	(Serbia) Aleksandar Katanić	Metalac G.M.	3	0	
6	(Serbia) Aleksandar Katai	Red Star	3	1	
7	(Serbia) Nemanja Kojić	Radnički Niš	1	1	
8	(Serbia) Siniša Babić	Proleter	1	1	
9	(Serbia) Nenad Lukić	TSC	1	2	
10	(Serbia) Luka Marković	Novi Pazar	3	0	
11	(Serbia) Nenad Lukić (2)	TSC	2	1	
12	(Montenegro) Nikola Drinčić	Vojvodina	1	1	
13	(Montenegro) Asmir Kajević	Čukarički	2	0	
14	(Serbia) Milan Đokić	Zlatibor	2	0	
15	(Serbia) Milan Makarić	Radnik	1	2	
16	(Hungary) Filip Holender	Partizan	2	1	
17	(Serbia) Dobrivoje Velemir	Bačka	1	2	
18	(Serbia) Petar Đuričković	Radnički Niš	2	0	
19	(Serbia) Miljan Vukadinović	Vojvodina	2	0	
20	(Serbia) Luka Luković	Javor Matis	2	1	
21	(Serbia) Miljan Vukadinović (2)	Vojvodina	2	0	
22	(Serbia) Branislav Tomić	Novi Pazar	1	0	
23	(Serbia) Đuro Zec	TSC	2	0	
24	(Japan) Takuma Asano	Partizan	1	2	
25	(Serbia) Milan Pavkov	Red Star	2	0	
26	(Comoros) Ben	Red Star	1	0	
27	(Serbia) Dejan Milićević	TSC	2	0	
28	(Serbia) Danko Kiković	Novi Pazar	1	1	
29	(Serbia) Đorđe Jovanović	Čukarički	2	1	
30	(Serbia) Andrija Kaluđerović	Rad	2	0	
31	(Serbia) Igor Maksimović	Metalac G.M.	1	1	
32	(Serbia) Miodrag Gemović	Vojvodina	2	0	
33	(Serbia) Alen Melunović	Napredak	3	0	
34	(Serbia) Milan Makarić (2)	Radnik	3	1	
35	(Serbia) Nemanja Mladenović	Rad	1	1	
36	(Montenegro) Mirko Ivanić	Red Star	2	2	
37	(Serbia) Alen Melunović (2)	Napredak	2	0	
38	(Serbia) Nenad Gavrić	Radnički Niš	3	0	
