= 2021–22 Serbian First League =

Serbian football league season

Serbian First League
- Season: 2021–22
- Dates: 7 August 2021 – 22 May 2022
- Champions: Mladost GAT
- Promoted: Mladost GAT; Javor
- Relegated: Kabel; Timok 1919; OFK Bačka; Budućnost; Žarkovo
- Matches: 296
- Goals: 691 (2.33 per match)
- Top goalscorer: Milan Vidakov (18 goals)
- Biggest home win: Zlatibor 7–0 Kabel
- Biggest away win: Zlatibor 0–5 Žarkovo
- Highest scoring: Inđija 5–3 Grafičar
- Longest winning run: IMT 7 games
- Longest unbeaten run: IMT 14 games
- Longest winless run: Kabel 19 games
- Longest losing run: Kabel 11 games

The 2021–22 Serbian First League is the 17th season of the Serbian First League since its establishment.

== League format ==
The league consist of 16 teams: eight teams from the 2020–21 Serbian First League, six teams relegated from 2020–21 Serbian SuperLiga and two new teams promoted from Serbian League.

== Teams ==
Location of teams in the 2021–22 Serbian First league
Locations of the 2021–22 Serbian First League teams from Belgrade

Team	City	Stadium	Capacity
Budućnost	Belgrade	Stadion FK Budućnost	1,000
Grafičar	Belgrade	Topčiderska zvezda	1,000
IMT	Belgrade	Stadion FK IMT	1,150
Inđija	Inđija	Inđija Stadium	4,500
Javor Matis	Ivanjica	Javor Stadium	3,000
Kabel	Novi Sad	FK Kabel Stadium	2,000
Loznica	Loznica	Lagator Stadium	5,000
Mačva	Šabac	Mačva Stadium	5,494
Mladost GAT	Novi Sad	Stadion FK Mladost	200
OFK Bačka	Bačka Palanka	Stadion Slavko Maletin Vava	4,000
Žarkovo	Belgrade	Žarkovo Stadium	610
Rad	Belgrade	King Peter I Stadium	3,919
Radnički	Sremska Mitrovica	Stadion FK Radnički	2,000
Timok 1919	Zaječar	Zaječar City Stadium	10,000
Železničar	Pančevo	SC Mladost	1,200
Zlatibor	Čajetina	Užice City Stadium	15,000

== Regular season ==
=== League table ===
Pos	Team	Pld	W	D	L	GF	GA	GD	Pts	Qualification
1	Inđija	30	17	7	6	48	29	+19	58	Qualification for the Championship round
2	Mladost GAT	30	16	9	5	35	17	+18	57	Qualification for the Championship round
3	Javor Matis	30	15	11	4	46	22	+24	56	Qualification for the Championship round
4	Železničar	30	15	7	8	42	31	+11	52	Qualification for the Championship round
5	IMT	30	13	10	7	49	30	+19	49	Qualification for the Championship round
6	Radnički	30	13	7	10	39	29	+10	46	Qualification for the Championship round
7	OFK Žarkovo	30	12	6	12	35	32	+3	42	Qualification for the Championship round
8	Loznica	30	11	8	11	29	26	+3	41	Qualification for the Championship round
9	Mačva	30	10	9	11	26	37	−11	39	Qualification for the Relegation round
10	Grafičar	30	10	5	15	44	43	+1	35	Qualification for the Relegation round
11	Rad	30	9	8	13	28	34	−6	35	Qualification for the Relegation round
12	Budućnost	30	9	8	13	30	41	−11	35	Qualification for the Relegation round
13	Zlatibor	30	8	10	12	28	35	−7	34	Qualification for the Relegation round
14	Timok 1919	30	9	6	15	29	35	−6	33	Qualification for the Relegation round
15	OFK Bačka	30	6	15	9	22	30	−8	33	Qualification for the Relegation round
16	Kabel	30	1	6	23	12	71	−59	9	Qualification for the Relegation round

Source: First league (in Serbian)
Rules for classification: 1) Points; 2) Head-to-head points; 3) Head-to-head goal difference; 4) Head-to-head goals scored; 5) Head-to-head away goals scored (if two teams tied); 6) Goal difference; 7) Goals scored; 8) Fair play ranking; 9) Draw.

=== Results ===
Home \ Away	INĐ	MNS	JAV	ŽEL	MAČ	ŽAR	IMT	RSM	LOZ	RAD	BAČ	ZLA	GRA	BDO	TMK	KBL
Inđija		2–1	0–2	1–3	2–1	1–0	4–0	1–1	0–0	1–0	1–1	3–1	5–3	2–1	0–1	3–0
Mladost GAT	2–3		0–0	2–1	2–0	2–0	1–1	0–1	0–0	1–0	1–0	2–3	2–0	1–0	2–1	4–0
Javor Matis	1–3	0–1		3–3	0–0	3–2	1–2	4–0	2–0	2–0	2–0	1–0	0–0	2–1	2–0	4–0
Železničar	0–0	3–0	1–3		1–1	2–2	1–2	1–0	0–0	2–1	1–2	1–0	1–0	2–0	3–2	2–0
Mačva	2–1	0–0	1–4	0–1		0–2	1–1	0–3	0–1	4–0	2–0	1–0	2–1	1–0	0–0	1–0
OFK Žarkovo	1–2	0–1	2–1	3–0	1–3		2–2	1–0	1–0	0–1	0–1	0–0	0–3	1–1	2–1	2–0
IMT	2–2	0–1	0–1	0–0	6–1	0–1		1–1	2–0	2–0	1–1	0–0	3–0	3–2	4–0	4–1
Radnički	0–3	0–1	1–1	2–1	2–0	2–0	1–2		1–2	0–0	1–1	1–0	1–0	3–0	5–2	2–3
Loznica	0–2	1–1	0–0	2–1	4–1	0–1	2–1	1–2		0–0	2–0	4–1	2–0	0–1	2–0	1–0
Rad	4–0	0–2	1–1	0–1	0–1	1–1	1–0	0–0	1–0		1–1	2–1	2–1	3–4	1–2	3–2
OFK Bačka	0–0	0–0	2–2	2–2	0–0	0–2	1–0	1–1	3–1	0–1		2–0	0–0	0–1	0–1	0–0
Zlatibor	1–0	0–0	0–0	2–0	1–1	0–5	0–0	2–1	0–0	1–0	0–0		2–0	0–2	0–1	7–0
Grafičar	1–1	0–0	1–2	0–3	3–0	3–0	1–3	0–2	2–1	3–1	4–0	5–1		2–2	2–0	3–1
Budućnost	0–1	1–1	0–0	1–3	1–1	2–0	2–3	1–0	2–1	0–0	0–1	1–1	3–2		0–2	1–0
Timok 1919	0–1	0–1	0–0	0–1	0–1	0–0	1–1	0–1	0–1	1–1	2–2	1–2	1–0	5–0		2–0
Kabel	0–3	0–3	1–2	0–1	0–0	0–3	0–3	0–4	1–1	0–3	1–1	1–1	1–4	0–0	0–3	

Source: First league (in Serbian)
Legend: Blue = home team win; Yellow = draw; Red = away team win.
For upcoming matches, an "a" indicates there is an article about the rivalry between the two participants.

== Play-offs ==
=== Promotion round ===
The top eight teams advanced from the regular season. Teams played each other once.

==== League table ====
Pos	Team	Pld	W	D	L	GF	GA	GD	Pts	Qualification
1	Mladost GAT (C, P)	37	21	9	7	48	24	+24	72	Promotion to the Serbian SuperLiga
2	Javor Matis (P)	37	19	12	6	57	30	+27	69	Promotion to the Serbian SuperLiga
3	Železničar	37	20	8	9	54	36	+18	68	Qualification for play-off
4	IMT	37	19	10	8	69	37	+32	67	Qualification for play-off
5	Inđija	37	19	7	11	55	38	+17	64	
6	Žarkovo (Note: OFK Žarkovo were relegated due to financial issues.) (R)	37	14	7	16	40	41	−1	49	Relegation to Serbian League
7	Radnički	37	13	9	15	42	45	−3	48	
8	Loznica	37	12	9	16	31	38	−7	45	

Source: First league (in Serbian)
Rules for classification: 1) Points; 2) Points in regular season; 3) Head-to-head points in regular season; 4) Head-to-head goal difference in regular season; 5) Head-to-head goals scored in regular season; 6) Head-to-head away goals scored in regular season (if two teams tied); 7) Goal difference; 8) Goals scored; 9) Fair play ranking; 10) Drawing of lots.
(C) Champions; (P) Promoted; (R) Relegated

=== Results ===
Home \ Away	IMT	INĐ	JAV	LOZ	MNS	RSM	ŽAR	ŽEL
IMT						5–0	2–1	1–2
Inđija	0–1		0–1		1–2	2–0		
Javor Matis	2–4			1–0		3–1		1–1
Loznica	0–4	2–1			0–2			
Mladost GAT	2–3		0–2				2–0	2–0
Radnički				0–0	1–3		1–1	
OFK Žarkovo		0–2	2–1	1–0				
Železničar		3–1		3–0		2–0	1–0	

Source: First league (in Serbian)
Legend: Blue = home team win; Yellow = draw; Red = away team win.
For upcoming matches, an "a" indicates there is an article about the rivalry between the two participants.

=== Relegation round ===
The bottom eight teams from the regular season play in the relegation round. Teams play each other once.

==== League table ====
Pos	Team	Pld	W	D	L	GF	GA	GD	Pts	
9	Grafičar	37	15	6	16	62	48	+14	51	
10	Mačva	37	12	12	13	33	45	−12	48	
11	Rad	37	13	9	15	40	41	−1	48	
12	Zlatibor	37	12	11	14	38	44	−6	47	
13	Budućnost (R)	37	11	12	14	40	49	−9	45	Relegation to Serbian League
14	Timok 1919 (R)	37	11	7	19	38	44	−6	40	Relegation to Serbian League
15	OFK Bačka (R)	37	8	15	14	30	43	−13	39	Relegation to Serbian League
16	Kabel (R)	37	2	7	28	15	89	−74	13	Relegation to Serbian League

Source: First league (in Serbian)
Rules for classification: 1) Points; 2) Points in regular season; 3) Head-to-head points in regular season; 4) Head-to-head goal difference in regular season; 5) Head-to-head goals scored in regular season; 6) Head-to-head away goals scored in regular season (if two teams tied); 7) Goal difference; 8) Goals scored; 9) Fair play ranking; 10) Drawing of lots.
(R) Relegated

=== Results ===
Home \ Away	BDO	GRA	KBL	MAČ	BAČ	RAD	TMK	ZLA
Budućnost		0–2			4–1	2–1		1–1
Grafičar			5–0			4–0	2–0	3–1
Kabel	1–1			2–1				0–1
Mačva	1–1	1–1					1–0	1–3
OFK Bačka		3–1	3–0	0–1				
Rad			2–0	1–1	2–0		3–0	
Timok 1919	1–1		5–0		3–0			
Zlatibor					2–1	0–3	2–0	

Source: First league (in Serbian)
Legend: Blue = home team win; Yellow = draw; Red = away team win.
For upcoming matches, an "a" indicates there is an article about the rivalry between the two participants.

== Individual statistics ==
=== Top scorers ===
As of matches played on 22 May 2022.

Pos	Scorer	Teams	Goals
1	(Serbia) Milan Vidakov	Mladost GAT	18
2	(Serbia) Pavle Ivelja	Javor	14
3	(Serbia) Borisav Burmaz	Grafičar	12
3	(Serbia) Vladimir Lučić	IMT	12
5	(Serbia) Luka Gojković	Rad	11
5	(Serbia) Vladan Milosavljev	Inđija	11
5	(Serbia) Lazar Milošev	Železničar	11
5	(Serbia) Vladimir Radočaj	IMT	11

=== Hat-tricks ===
Player	For	Against	Result	Date
(Serbia) Brana Ilić	Železničar	Grafičar	3–0	21 August 2021
(Serbia) Nikola Žakula	Inđija	IMT	4–0	10 October 2021
(Serbia) Luka Čumić ^{4}	Zlatibor	Kabel	7–0	6 December 2021
(Serbia) Borisav Burmaz	Grafičar	Zlatibor	5–1	28 March 2022
(Serbia) Lazar Nikolić	Javor	Kabel	4–0	10 April 2022
(Serbia) Borisav Burmaz	Grafičar	Kabel	5–0	15 April 2022
(Serbia) Borisav Burmaz ^{4}	Grafičar	Rad	4–0	8 May 2022

^{4} Player scored four goals
