= Nebojša Gavrić =

Serbian footballer

Personal information
- Full name: Nebojša Gavrić
- Date of birth: 27 August 1991 (age 35)
- Place of birth: Zrenjanin, SFR Yugoslavia
- Height: 1.85 m (6 ft 1 in)
- Position: Midfielder

Team information
- Current team: Majevica

Senior career*
| Years | Team | Apps | (Gls) |
| 2010–2012 | Borac Čačak | 4 | (0) |
| 2011–2012 | → Rudar Ugljevik (loan) | | |
| 2012–2017 | Mladost Lučani | 132 | (8) |
| 2017–2018 | Voždovac | 19 | (0) |
| 2018–2019 | Bačka Palanka | 32 | (2) |
| 2019–2020 | Sarajevo | 16 | (0) |
| 2020–2021 | Bačka | 10 | (0) |
| 2021 | Olimpik | 10 | (1) |
| 2021–2023 | Tuzla City | 48 | (1) |
| 2023 | Zvijezda 09 | 7 | (0) |
| 2024–2026 | Radnik Bijeljina | 26 | (0) |
| 2025 | → Majevica (loan) | | |
| 2026– | Majevica | 3 | (1) |
- * Club domestic league appearances and goals as of 5 September 2026

Nebojša Gavrić (Serbian Cyrillic: Небојша Гаврић; born 27 August 1991) is a Serbian professional footballer who plays as a midfielder for First League of RS club Majevica.

== Trivia ==
Gavrić is one of the most tattooed Serbian footballers, having many tattoos on his whole body. He says that every tattoo has an explanation and a specific meaning.

== Career statistics ==
=== Club ===
As of match played 5 September 2026

Appearances and goals by club, season and competition
| Club | Season | League | | | National cup (Note: Includes Serbian Cup, Bosnian Cup) | | Continental | | Total | |
| Club | Season | Division | Apps | Goals | Apps | Goals | Apps | Goals | Apps | Goals |
|---|---|---|---|---|---|---|---|---|---|---|
| Borac Čačak | 2009–10 | Serbian SuperLiga | 3 | 0 | — | | — | | 3 | 0 |
| Borac Čačak | 2010–11 | Serbian SuperLiga | 1 | 0 | — | | — | | 1 | 0 |
| Borac Čačak | Total | | 4 | 0 | — | | — | | 4 | 0 |
| Mladost Lučani | 2012–13 | Serbian First League | 27 | 1 | 1 | 0 | — | | 28 | 1 |
| Mladost Lučani | 2013–14 | Serbian First League | 25 | 3 | 1 | 0 | — | | 26 | 3 |
| Mladost Lučani | 2014–15 | Serbian SuperLiga | 27 | 2 | — | | — | | 27 | 2 |
| Mladost Lučani | 2015–16 | Serbian SuperLiga | 33 | 2 | — | | — | | 33 | 2 |
| Mladost Lučani | 2016–17 | Serbian SuperLiga | 20 | 0 | 3 | 0 | — | | 23 | 0 |
| Mladost Lučani | Total | | 132 | 8 | 5 | 0 | — | | 137 | 8 |
| Voždovac | 2017–18 | Serbian SuperLiga | 19 | 0 | 1 | 0 | — | | 20 | 0 |
| Bačka | 2018–19 | Serbian SuperLiga | 32 | 2 | 1 | 0 | — | | 33 | 2 |
| Sarajevo | 2019–20 | Bosnian Premier League | 16 | 0 | 1 | 0 | 2 (Note: Appearances in UEFA Europa League) | 0 | 19 | 0 |
| Bačka | 2020–21 | Serbian SuperLiga | 10 | 0 | 1 | 0 | — | | 11 | 0 |
| Olimpik | 2020–21 | Bosnian Premier League | 10 | 1 | — | | — | | 10 | 1 |
| Tuzla City | 2021–22 | Bosnian Premier League | 28 | 1 | 5 | 0 | — | | 33 | 1 |
| Tuzla City | 2022–23 | Bosnian Premier League | 20 | 0 | 6 | 0 | 2 (Note: Appearances in UEFA Europa Conference League) | 0 | 28 | 0 |
| Tuzla City | Total | | 48 | 1 | 11 | 0 | 2 | 0 | 61 | 1 |
| Zvijezda 09 | 2023–24 | Bosnian Premier League | 7 | 0 | 1 | 0 | — | | 8 | 0 |
| Radnik Bijeljina | 2023–24 | First League of RS | 11 | 0 | — | | — | | 11 | 0 |
| Radnik Bijeljina | 2024–25 | Bosnian Premier League | 15 | 0 | 0 | 0 | — | | 15 | 0 |
| Radnik Bijeljina | Total | | 26 | 0 | 0 | 0 | — | | 26 | 0 |
| Majevica | 2026–27 | First League of RS | 3 | 1 | — | | — | | 3 | 1 |
| Career total | | | 307 | 13 | 21 | 0 | 4 | 0 | 332 | 13 |

== Honours ==
Mladost Lučani

- Serbian First League: 2013–14

Sarajevo

- Bosnian Premier League: 2019–20
