= Aleksa Milojević =

Serbian footballer

Personal information
- Date of birth: 8 January 2000 (age 26)
- Place of birth: Jagodina, FR Yugoslavia
- Height: 1.86 m (6 ft 1 in)
- Position: Goalkeeper

Team information
- Current team: Dubočica
- Number: 32

Youth career
- –2016: Jagodina

Senior career*
Years	Team	Apps	(Gls)
2016–2018	Jagodina	24	(0)
2018–2022	OFK Bačka	84	(0)
2022–2023	Mladost Novi Sad	40	(0)
2023–2024	Aiolikos	7	(0)
2024	Inđija	0	(0)
2024–2025	GOŠK Gabela	1	(0)
2025–	Dubočica	8	(0)

International career^{‡}
2015	Serbia U15		
2015–2016	Serbia U16	6	(0)
2016–2017	Serbia U17	9	(0)
2018	Serbia U18	1	(0)
2018–2019	Serbia U19	5	(0)
2021	Serbia U21	2	(0)
- * Club domestic league appearances and goals as of 14 May 2026 ‡ National team caps and goals as of 18:21, 6 June 2021 (UTC)

Aleksa Milojević (Serbian Cyrillic: Алекса Милојевић; born 8 January 2000) is a Serbian professional footballer who plays as a goalkeeper for Dubočica].

== Club career ==
=== Jagodina ===
==== 2015–16 season ====
Born in Jagodina, Milojević passed the youth school of club with the same name. He joined the first team roster for the spring half of 2015–16 season, at the age of 16. After Đorđe Nikolić injured, Milojević travelled to Antalya, where passed the preparations along with two other choices Lazar Tatić and Miroslav Stamenković, where he played some friendly matches for the winter break off-season. During the regular season, Milojević spent mostly matches as a reserve goalkeeper. He made his professional debut in the last fixture of 2015–16 Serbian SuperLiga against OFK Beograd, played on 21 May 2016, when he replaced Tatić in 61 minute of the match.

==== 2016–17 season ====
After Nikolić and Tatić left the club in summer 2016, Milojević became the first choice goalkeeper at the beginning of new season. He started his first senior match on the field in the first fixture of the 2016–17 Serbian First League season, against Radnički Pirot when kept a clean sheet. In August 2016, Milojević signed his first three-year professional contract with club. Later, during the season, he was usually called into the national team and missed mostly matches in the Serbian First League. He also played with youth team as well.

== International career ==
Milojević got a first call into the Serbia U17 national team squad for tournament played in Hungary in July and August 2016. Previously, he was a member of U15 and U16 teams between 2015 and 2016.

== Career statistics ==
As of 2 December 2020

Club	Season	League			Cup		Continental		Other		Total	
Club	Season	Division	Apps	Goals	Apps	Goals	Apps	Goals	Apps	Goals	Apps	Goals
Jagodina	2015–16	Serbian SuperLiga	1	0	—		—		—		1	0
Jagodina	2016–17	Serbian First League	7	0	—		—		—		7	0
Jagodina	2017–18	Serbian First League	15	0	1	0	—		—		16	0
Jagodina	Total		24	0	1	0	—		—		25	0
OFK Bačka	2018–19	Serbian SuperLiga	1	0	0	0	—		—		1	0
OFK Bačka	2019–20	Serbian First League	29	0	0	0	—		—		29	0
OFK Bačka	2020–21	Serbian SuperLiga	16	0	1	0	—		—		17	0
OFK Bačka	Total		46	0	1	0	—		—		47	0
Total			70	0	2	0	—		—		72	0
