= Dimitrije Tomović =

Serbian footballer

Personal information
- Date of birth: 29 April 1996 (age 30)
- Place of birth: Raška, FR Yugoslavia
- Height: 1.95 m (6 ft 5 in)
- Position: Defender

Team information
- Current team: Bane Raška

Youth career
- Bane
- 2014: OFK Beograd

Senior career*
Years	Team	Apps	(Gls)
2013	Bane	15	(1)
2014	OFK Beograd	0	(0)
2015	Bane	12	(0)
2015–2018	Spartak Subotica	10	(0)
2015–2016	→ Senta (loan)	22	(0)
2016	→ ČSK Čelarevo (loan)	13	(0)
2017	→ Bačka 1901 (loan)	3	(0)
2018	→ Proleter Novi Sad (loan)	2	(0)
2018–2019	Hajduk 1912	30	(0)
2019–2020	Bačka Palanka	35	(0)
2021	Železničar Pančevo	20	(0)
2022	Borac Čačak		
2022-	Bane		
- * Club domestic league appearances and goals as of 27 September 2021

Dimitrije Tomović (Serbian Cyrillic: Димитрије Томовић; born 29 April 1996) is a Serbian footballer who plays as a defender. He mainly operates as a centre-back, being capable of playing on multiple positions in defense or as a defensive midfielder.

== Club career ==
=== Bane ===
Born in Raška, Tomović made his first senior appearances with local club Bane. During the first half of 2013–14 season, he played 15 matches and scored 1 goal in the Serbian League West. That goal he scored against Loznica on 13 October, when he was declared as the man of the match. In the winter break off-season 2013–14, Tomović joined OFK Beograd. He was with youth team until the end of 2014. Beginning of 2015, Tomović returned in his home club Bane, where he spent next six months.

=== Spartak Subotica ===
In summer 2015, Tomović signed with Spartak Subotica, but he was also loaned to Senta at one-year dual registration. He made his SuperLiga debut in the 11th match fixture of the 2015–16 season, against his former club, OFK Beograd. Returning in Spartak in summer 2016, Tomović spent complete pre-season with the first team, but later moved on loan to ČSK Čelarevo, where he stayed until the end of same year. In March 2017, Tomović signed his first four-and-a-half year professional contract with club. In summer 2017, Tomović on a half-season loan deal to Bačka 1901. In February 2018, Tomović moved on loan to Proleter Novi Sad for the rest of the 2017–18 Serbian First League campaign.

== Career statistics ==
As of 1 December 2020

Appearances and goals by club, season and competition
Club	Season	League			Cup		Continental		Other		Total	
Club	Season	Division	Apps	Goals	Apps	Goals	Apps	Goals	Apps	Goals	Apps	Goals
Bane	2013–14	Serbian League West	15	1	—		—		—		15	1
Bane	2014–15	Serbian League West	12	0	—		—		—		12	0
Bane	Total		27	1	—		—		—		27	1
Senta (loan)	2015–16	Serbian League Vojvodina	22	0	—		—		—		22	0
ČSK Čelarevo (loan)	2016–17	Serbian First League	13	0	1	0	—		—		14	0
Bačka 1901 (loan)	2017–18	Serbian League Vojvodina	3	0	—		—		—		3	0
Proleter Novi Sad (loan)	2017–18	Serbian First League	2	0	—		—		—		2	0
Spartak Subotica	2015–16	Serbian SuperLiga	1	0	0	0	—		—		1	0
Spartak Subotica	2016–17	Serbian SuperLiga	9	0	—		—		—		9	0
Spartak Subotica	2017–18	Serbian SuperLiga	0	0	—		—		—		0	0
Spartak Subotica	Total		10	0	0	0	—		—		10	0
Proleter Novi Sad	2017–18	Serbian First League	2	0	0	0	—		—		2	0
Hajduk 1912	2018–19	Serbian League Vojvodina	30	0	0	0	—		—		30	0
OFK Bačka	2019–20	Serbian First League	28	0	0	0	—		—		28	0
OFK Bačka	2020–21	Serbian SuperLiga	5	0	1	0	—		—		6	0
OFK Bačka	Total		33	0	1	0	—		—		34	0
Career total			142	1	2	0	—		—		144	1

== Honours ==
Proleter Novi Sad

- Serbian First League: 2017–18
