= Zličić =

Zličić is a surname of Serbian origin. Notable people with the surname include:

- Lazar Zličić (born 1997), Serbian footballer
- Miloš Zličić (born 1999), Serbian footballer
