= Luka Marković =

Serbian football player

Personal information
- Date of birth: 19 February 2000 (age 26)
- Place of birth: Belgrade, Serbia, FR Yugoslavia
- Height: 1.87 m (6 ft 2 in)
- Position: Forward

Team information
- Current team: Sedriano

Youth career
- –2018: Red Star Belgrade
- 2018: Čukarički
- 2018–2020: Crotone
- 2018–2019: → Juventus (loan)
- 2019–2020: → Torino (loan)

Senior career*
Years	Team	Apps	(Gls)
2020–2022	Red Star Belgrade	0	(0)
2020	→ Novi Pazar (loan)	10	(3)
2021	→ Mačva Šabac (loan)	6	(0)
2021	→ Grafičar (loan)	2	(0)
2021–2022	→ Bačka Palanka (loan)	24	(2)
2022	Aluminij	3	(0)
2023	Irodotos	7	(0)
2024	Vogherese	12	(2)
2024	Pavia		
2025	Sedriano		
- * Club domestic league appearances and goals as of 10:12, 2 February 2022 (UTC)

Luka Marković (Serbian Cyrillic: Лука Марковић; born 19 February 2000) is a Serbian professional footballer who plays as a forward for Pavia.

He joined Italian side Vogherese in January 2024 and moved to Pavia in summer 2024.

== Honours ==
Individual

- Serbian SuperLiga Player of the Week: 2020–21 (Round 10)
