= Marko Pantić =

Serbian footballer

Personal information
- Date of birth: 18 June 1998 (age 28)
- Place of birth: Novi Sad, FR Yugoslavia
- Height: 1.88 m (6 ft 2 in)
- Position: Defensive midfielder

Team information
- Current team: Tekstilac Odžaci
- Number: 4

Youth career
- ŽSK Žabalj
- Sloga Temerin
- Vojvodina
- Spartak Subotica

Senior career*
Years	Team	Apps	(Gls)
2016–2018	Spartak Subotica	16	(0)
2016	→ Hajduk Čurug (loan)	14	(1)
2018	→ ČSK Čelarevo (loan)	13	(1)
2018–2019	Bačka Palanka	32	(1)
2019–2020	Proleter Novi Sad	6	(0)
2020–2021	Bačka Palanka	38	(2)
2021–2023	Napredak Kruševac	23	(0)
2023–2024	Al-Shaeib		
2024	Inđija	14	(0)
2025	Trayal Kruševac	15	(2)
2025-2026	Tekstilac Odžaci	35	(0)

International career
2017	Serbia U19	2	(0)
- * Club domestic league appearances and goals as of 14 May 2026

Marko Pantić (Serbian Cyrillic: Марко Пантић; born 18 June 1998) is a Serbian footballer who plays as a defensive midfielder for Tekstilac Odžaci.

== Club career ==
=== Spartak Subotica ===
Born in Novi Sad, Pantić was a member ŽSK Žabalj, Sloga Temerin, Vojvodina and Spartak Subotica youth categories. In summer 2016, Pantić moved on one-year loan to fourth level league club Hajduk Čurug. After the first half-season he spent with the club as a bonus player in the Vojvodina League South, a loan deal was terminated and he returned to Spartak Subotica.

Next he spent the winter break off-season playing several friendly matches, Pantić promoted as a first team player of Spartak Subotica in February 2017. He made his official debut for the club in the 22 fixture match of 2016–17 Serbian SuperLiga season against Vojvodina, played on 19 February 2017 at the Subotica City Stadium. Pantić signed his first four-and-a-half year professional contract with club in March 2017. During the first half-season of the 2017–18 Serbian SuperLiga campaign, Pantić was usually used as a back-up choice under coach Aleksandar Veselinović, after which he moved on loan to ČSK Čelarevo for the rest of season. Returning to Spartak Subotica, Pantić passed the first training with the club, and following preparing period on the Zlatibor mountain. At the beginning of July 2018, Pantić mutually terminated the contract and left the club.

=== OFK Bačka ===
On 2 July 2018, Pantić moved to OFK Bačka, penning a two-year deal with new club. Pantić made his debut for the club in second fixture match of the 2018–19 Serbian SuperLiga campaign, in 2–1 victory over his ex club, Spartak Subotica.

=== Napredak Kruševac ===
In June 2021, he joined Napredak Kruševac.

=== Al-Shaeib ===
On 20 June 2023, Pantić joined Al-Shaeib.

== International career ==
In March 2017, as a coach of Serbia under-19 national level, Milan Obradović called Pantić into the squad for elite qualification round of the 2017 UEFA European Under-19 Championship. He made his debut for the team in a match against Slovakia, played on 23 March 2017. He also played a full-time match against Germany, two days later.

== Career statistics ==
As of 1 December 2020

Appearances and goals by club, season and competition
Club	Season	League			Cup		Continental		Other		Total	
Club	Season	Division	Apps	Goals	Apps	Goals	Apps	Goals	Apps	Goals	Apps	Goals
Hajduk Čurug (loan)	2016–17	Vojvodina League South	14	1	—		—		—		14	1
Spartak Subotica	2016–17	Serbian SuperLiga	15	0	—		—		—		15	0
Spartak Subotica	2017–18	Serbian SuperLiga	1	0	1	0	—		—		2	0
Spartak Subotica	Total		16	0	1	0	—		—		17	0
ČSK Čelarevo (loan)	2017–18	Serbian First League	13	1	—		—		—		13	1
OFK Bačka	2018–19	Serbian SuperLiga	32	1	1	0	—		—		33	1
Proleter Novi Sad	2019–20	Serbian SuperLiga	6	0	2	0	—		—		8	0
OFK Bačka	2019–20	Serbian First League	6	0	0	0	—		—		6	0
OFK Bačka	2020–21	Serbian SuperLiga	13	1	1	0	—		—		14	1
OFK Bačka	Total		19	1	1	0	—		—		20	1
Career total			100	4	5	0	—		—		105	4
