= Branislav Tomić =

Serbian footballer (born 1995)

Personal information
- Date of birth: 12 February 1995 (age 31)
- Place of birth: Čačak, FR Yugoslavia
- Height: 1.78 m (5 ft 10 in)
- Position: Winger

Team information
- Current team: Borac Čačak
- Number: 7

Youth career
- 2002–2014: Borac Čačak

Senior career*
Years	Team	Apps	(Gls)
2014–2016	Borac Čačak	6	(0)
2014–2016	→ Polet Ljubić (loan)	31	(4)
2016–2019	Metalac Gornji Milanovac	59	(4)
2019	OFK Bačka	16	(1)
2019–2020	Inđija	16	(3)
2020–2021	Novi Pazar	32	(4)
2021–2022	Radnički Niš	34	(2)
2023	Rudar Prijedor	16	(3)
2023–2024	Napredak Kruševac	16	(0)
2024–	Borac Čačak	30	(1)
- * Club domestic league appearances and goals as of 14 May 2026

Branislav Tomić (Serbian Cyrillic: Бранислав Томић; born 12 February 1995) is a Serbian professional footballer who plays as a midfielder for Borac Čačak.

== Club career ==
=== Borac Čačak ===
As a member of youth school, Tomić signed a scholarship contract with Borac Čačak on 24 August 2012. For the 2014–15, he was loaned to Polet Ljubić. In summer 2015, he was on trial with Zeta, but later he returned in Borac Čačak and was licensed for the first team. He made his SuperLiga debut in 8th fixture of the 2015–16 season, against Jagodina under coach Nenad Lalatović. After he made 5 league and 1 cup appearance until the end of first-half season, he was loaned to Polet Ljubić for the second half of season on dual registration. He was also played the last fixture match of the season, against Voždovac. Tomić started the 2016–17 season with his home club, but after he did not make any official appearances, he terminated the contract and left the contract.

=== Metalac Gornji Milanovac ===
In summer 2016, Tomić joined Metalac Gornji Milanovac and signed a three-year contract. He made his debut for new club in a cup match against Žarkovo. He also made a league debut for new club in 10 fixture of the 2016–17 season against Partizan.

== Career statistics ==
As of 1 January 2017

Club	Season	League			Cup		Continental		Other		Total	
Club	Season	Division	Apps	Goals	Apps	Goals	Apps	Goals	Apps	Goals	Apps	Goals
Borac Čačak	2013–14	Serbian First League	0	0	0	0	—		—		0	0
Borac Čačak	2014–15	Serbian SuperLiga	0	0	0	0	—		—		0	0
Borac Čačak	2015–16	Serbian SuperLiga	6	0	1	0	—		—		7	1
Borac Čačak	2016–17	Serbian SuperLiga	0	0	—		—		—		0	0
Borac Čačak	Total		6	0	1	0	—		—		7	0
Polet Ljubić (loan)	2014–15	Serbian League West	23	4	—		—		—		23	4
Polet Ljubić (loan)	2015–16	Serbian League West	8	0	—		—		—		8	0
Polet Ljubić (loan)	Total		31	4	—		—		—		31	4
Metalac Gornji Milanovac	2016–17	Serbian SuperLiga	4	0	1	0	—		—		5	0
Career total			41	4	2	0	—		—		43	2

== Honours ==
Individual

- Serbian SuperLiga Player of the Week: 2020–21 (Round 22)
