= Luka Pisačić =

Croatian footballer

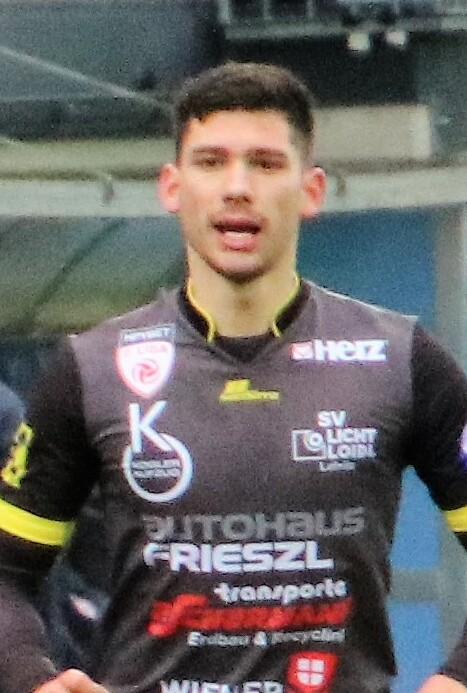

Personal information
- Full name: Pisačić in 2020
- Date of birth: 29 August 1997 (age 29)
- Place of birth: Zagreb, Croatia
- Height: 1.90 m (6 ft 3 in)
- Position: Forward

Team information
- Current team: Mladost Ždralovi
- Number: 9

Youth career
- –2013: Naftaš Ivanić Grad
- 2016: Slaven Belupo

Senior career*
Years	Team	Apps	(Gls)
2013–2014	Graničar Tučenik		
2014–2015	Strmec Bedenica		
2015	Naftaš Ivanić Grad		
2015–2016	Strmec Bedenica		
2016	Strmec Bedenica		
2017	SV Eberau	11	(5)
2018–2019	Mattersburg II	13	(7)
2019–2020	Lafnitz	6	(1)
2020–2021	Bačka Palanka	15	(1)
2021–2022	Opava	8	(0)
2022–2023	Leoben	15	(2)
2023–	Mladost Ždralovi	12	(7)
- * Club domestic league appearances and goals as of 19:05, 4 March 2024 (UTC)

Luka Pisačić (born 29 August 1997) is a Croatian professional football who plays as a forward for NK Mladost Ždralovi.

== Career ==
Born in Croatian capital Zagreb, Pisačić began his professional senior career in Austria playing with reserves team of SV Mattersburg. He also played with SV Lafnitz in Austrian Football Second League before moving to Serbia in summer 2020 and signing with OFK Bačka in 2020–21 Serbian SuperLiga.

On 9 August 2021, he signed with Opava in the Czech Republic.
