= Petar Remete =

Croatian footballer

Personal information
- Date of birth: 13 August 1937
- Place of birth: Ilok, Kingdom of Yugoslavia
- Date of death: 22 October 2011 (aged 74)
- Positions: Forward; winger

Senior career*
Years	Team	Apps	(Gls)
1954–1955	Sloga Vukovar		
1955–1961	Bačka Bačka Palanka		
1961–1962	Dinamo Zagreb	17	(4)
1962–1963	Trešnjevka		
1963–1964	Karlovac		
1964–1965	Kladivar		
1965–1966	Lokomotiva Zagreb		
1966–1973	Bačka Bačka Palanka		

International career
	Yugoslavia U-21	3	(?)
- * Club domestic league appearances and goals

Petar Remete (13 August 1937 – 22 October 2011) was a Croatian footballer.

== Career ==
Born in Ilok, Danube Banovina, Kingdom of Yugoslavia, he begin his career in 1954 playing with Sloga Vukovar, a traditional club from that town neighbouring to his birthplace, and predecessor of nowadays HNK Vukovar '91. After only one season, he moved to Bačka Bačka Palanka where he stayed 6 seasons. His great performances as forward earned him 3 appearances in the Yugoslav U-21 team, and, after crowning himself top-scorer of the Yugoslav Second League in 1960, he called the attention of the big clubs, ending up by signing with Dinamo Zagreb in 1961. During his time at Dinamo, he played mostly as either left or right winger, and he scored a total of 27 goals in 46 appearances, of which 17 appearances and 4 goals were in the Yugoslav First League. He then went on and played with Trešnjevka, Karlovac, Kladivar and Lokomotiva, one season with each of the clubs, before returning to Bačka Bačka Palanka in 1966 and played there until he finished his career in 1973.

He died on 22 October 2011.

== Honours ==
- Yugoslav Second League top-scorer: 1960
