= Borisav Burmaz =

Serbian footballer (born 2001)

Personal information
- Date of birth: 21 April 2001 (age 25)
- Place of birth: Valjevo, FR Yugoslavia
- Height: 1.85 m (6 ft 1 in)
- Position: Striker

Team information
- Current team: TSC
- Number: 9

Youth career
- –2020: Red Star Belgrade

Senior career*
Years	Team	Apps	(Gls)
2019–2021	Red Star Belgrade	0	(0)
2020–2021	→ Grafičar Beograd (loan)	27	(8)
2021	Radnički 1923	18	(1)
2022	Grafičar Beograd	16	(12)
2022–2023	Voždovac	49	(16)
2024–2026	Rapid București	57	(9)
2026–	TSC	0	(0)

International career
2017–2018	Serbia U17	9	(1)
2019	Serbia U18	1	(0)
2019	Serbia U19	3	(0)
- * Club domestic league appearances and goals as of 27 July 2026

Borisav Burmaz (Serbian Cyrillic: Борисав Бурмаз; born 21 April 2001) is a Serbian professional footballer who plays as a striker for Serbian First League club TSC.

A product of Red Star Belgrade, Burmaz also represented Grafičar Beograd, Radnički 1923, and Voždovac in Serbia before moving abroad to Romanian team Rapid București.

Internationally, Burmaz earned caps for Serbia at under-17, under-18, and under-19 levels.

== Club career ==
=== Red Star Belgrade ===
Burmaz made his senior debut for his boyhood team Red Star Belgrade on 10 October 2019, in a 8–0 away thrashing of Trepča in the Serbian Cup.

The following summer, he was loaned out for one season to Serbian First League club Grafičar Beograd. He scored his first senior goal on 18 September 2020, in a 1–1 draw with Žarkovo.

=== Radnički 1923 ===
Burmaz moved to Serbian SuperLiga side Radnički 1923 in July 2021. He registered his debut on 6 August, in a 1–0 away league loss to Radnik Surdulica.

Burmaz scored his only goal of the campaign on 26 September 2021, in a 4–1 loss to Metalac Gornji Milanovac.

=== Return to Grafičar Beograd ===
Burmaz returned to Grafičar Beograd midway through the 2021–22 season, and scored 12 goals from 16 appearances in the Serbian First League.

=== Voždovac ===
In the summer of 2022, Burmaz signed for top flight club Voždovac as a free agent. He totalled 32 games and six goals in all competitions during his first year with "the Dragons".

On 26 August 2023, Burmaz opened the scoring in a 3–2 home victory over his former team Red Star Belgrade. By the turn of the year, he became the second-best scorer of the Serbian SuperLiga with ten goals.

=== Rapid București ===
On 24 December 2023, Burmaz moved abroad for the first time by signing a contract with Romanian team Rapid București.

Burmaz made his debut on 20 January 2024, netting a late winner in a 4–3 Liga I defeat of FC U Craiova. One week later, he scored in a 2–1 away derby win over Dinamo București.

== Career statistics ==
As of match played 27 July 2026

Appearances and goals by club, season and competition
Club	Season	League			National cup (Note: Includes Serbian Cup, Cupa României)		Europe		Other		Total	
Club	Season	Division	Apps	Goals	Apps	Goals	Apps	Goals	Apps	Goals	Apps	Goals
Red Star Belgrade	2019–20	Serbian SuperLiga	0	0	1	0	0	0	0	0	1	0
Grafičar Beograd (loan)	2020–21	Serbian First League	27	8	0	0	—		—		27	8
Radnički 1923	2021–22	Serbian SuperLiga	18	1	0	0	—		—		18	1
Grafičar Beograd	2021–22	Serbian First League	16	12	—		—		—		16	12
Voždovac	2022–23	Serbian SuperLiga	31	6	1	0	—		—		32	6
Voždovac	2023–24	Serbian SuperLiga	18	10	1	0	—		—		19	10
Voždovac	Total		49	16	2	0	—		—		51	16
Rapid București	2023–24	Liga I	19	7	—		—		—		19	7
Rapid București	2024–25	Liga I	33	2	5	2	—		—		38	4
Rapid București	2025–26	Liga I	3	0	0	0	—		—		3	0
Rapid București	2026–27	Liga I	2	0	0	0	—		—		2	0
Rapid București	Total		57	9	5	2	—		—		62	11
TSC	2026–27	Serbian First League	0	0	0	0	—		—		0	0
Career total			167	46	8	2	0	0	0	0	175	48
