= Luka Luković =

Serbian footballer

Personal information
- Date of birth: 11 October 1996 (age 30)
- Place of birth: Belgrade, FR Yugoslavia
- Height: 1.89 m (6 ft 2 in)
- Position: Attacking midfielder

Team information
- Current team: IMT
- Number: 8

Youth career
- 2011–2013: Red Star Belgrade
- 2013–2014: Vojvodina

Senior career*
Years	Team	Apps	(Gls)
2014–2015	Vojvodina	22	(1)
2015–2016	Biel-Bienne	14	(1)
2016–2018	Bačka	57	(13)
2018	Mouscron	2	(0)
2019–2020	Čukarički	19	(1)
2020–2022	Javor Ivanjica	92	(28)
2023–	IMT	116	(13)

International career
2015	Serbia U19	2	(0)
- * Club domestic league appearances and goals as of 13 June 2026

Luka Luković (Serbian Cyrillic: Лука Луковић; born 11 October 1996) is a Serbian professional footballer who plays as an attacking midfielder for IMT.

== Club career ==
After period in Red Star Belgrade, he left to Novi Sad, and joined Vojvodina. He made his Serbian SuperLiga debut for Vojvodina on away match against Radnički Kragujevac on 26 April 2014. He terminated the contract with Vojvodina and left the club in summer 2015 as a free agent. After he spent a season with Biel-Bienne in the Swiss Challenge League, Luković joined Bačka in summer 2016. Scoring goal in second match for new club, Luković made the first Serbian SuperLiga victory for Bačka. In summer 2018, after contract with Bačka expired, Luković agreed on a three-year deal with the Belgian First Division A side Royal Excel Mouscron as a single player.

On 21 January 2019, Luković signed with FK Čukarički until June 2022.

== Career statistics ==
As of 8 June 2018

Appearances and goals by club, season and competition
Club	Season	League			Cup		Continental		Other		Total	
Club	Season	Division	Apps	Goals	Apps	Goals	Apps	Goals	Apps	Goals	Apps	Goals
Vojvodina	2013–14	Serbian SuperLiga	4	0	—		—		—		4	0
Vojvodina	2014–15	Serbian SuperLiga	18	1	1	0	0	0	—		19	1
Vojvodina	Total		22	1	1	0	0	0	—		23	1
Biel-Bienne	2015–16	Swiss Challenge League	14	1	—		—		—		14	1
Bačka	2016–17	Serbian SuperLiga	27	4	1	0	—		—		28	4
Bačka	2017–18	Serbian SuperLiga	30	9	1	0	—		—		31	9
Bačka	Total		57	13	2	0	—		—		59	13
Career total			93	15	3	0	0	0	—		96	15

== Honours ==
Individual

- Serbian SuperLiga Player of the Week: 2020–21 (Round 20)
