= Slađan Mijatović =

Serbian footballer

Personal information
- Full name: Slađan Mijatović
- Date of birth: 23 May 1994 (age 32)
- Place of birth: Paraćin, FR Yugoslavia
- Height: 1.78 m (5 ft 10 in)
- Position: Left-back

Team information
- Current team: Ægir
- Number: 20

Youth career
- OFK Paraćin
- OFK Beograd

Senior career*
Years	Team	Apps	(Gls)
2012	Dorćol	9	(0)
2013	Železnik	24	(0)
2014–2017	Jagodina	13	(0)
2014–2016	→ Tabane Trgovački (loan)	26	(2)
2017–2018	Jedinstvo Paraćin		
2018–2019	Žarkovo	35	(0)
2019–2020	Radnički Kragujevac	22	(0)
2020–2023	Bačka Palanka	58	(0)
2023	Ægir	7	(0)
2023–2024	Borac Paraćin		
2024–	Ægir	7	(0)
- * Club domestic league appearances and goals as of 21:05, 22 June 2024 (UTC)

Slađan Mijatović (Serbian Cyrillic: Слађан Мијатовић; born 23 May 1994) is a Serbian football defender who plays for Icelandic third level club Ægir.

== Club career ==
Mijatović has started playing in football school "VUK", and later moved to OFK Beograd youth academy. He started his senior career in the Serbian League Belgrade side Dorćol, and later he also played with Železnik. In the winter break off-season 2013–14, he signed with Jagodina. He made his professional debut for Jagodina in Serbian SuperLiga home match versus Red Star Belgrade on 1 March 2014. During the time he played under contract with Jagodina, Mijatović was loaned on dual registration with the satellite club Tabane Trgovački. In 2017, he terminated a contract with Jagodina and left the club as a free agent. Later he moved to Jedinstvo Paraćin.
