= Nikola Eskić =

Bosnian footballer

Personal information
- Date of birth: 19 December 1997 (age 28)
- Place of birth: Bijeljina, Bosnia and Herzegovina
- Height: 1.82 m (5 ft 11 1/2 in)
- Position: Midfielder

Team information
- Current team: Khujand
- Number: 8

Youth career
- –2014: Milići
- 2014–2015: Vlasenica

Senior career*
Years	Team	Apps	(Gls)
2015	Vlasenica	10	(6)
2016	Zvijezda 09	14	(0)
2017–2020	Napredak Kruševac	79	(6)
2020–2021	OFK Bačka	33	(0)
2021–2022	Bregalnica Štip	28	(2)
2022	Riteriai	15	(0)
2023–2024	Aksu	20	(0)
2024	Sloboda Užice	8	(0)
2024–2025	Al-Shabab	0	(0)
2025	Dubočica	16	(0)
2026–	Khujand	2	(0)

International career^{‡}
2018	Bosnia and Herzegovina U21	1	(0)
- * Club domestic league appearances and goals as of 16 March 2026 ‡ National team caps and goals as of 31 August 2020

Nikola Eskić (Serbian Cyrillic: Никола Ескић, born 19 December 1997) is a Bosnian footballer who plays as a midfielder for Khujand.

== Club career ==
As a youth player, Eskić joined FK Vlasenica from football club Milići in summer 2014. He was playing with FK Vlasenica in the first half of the 2015–16 First League of Republika Srpska. In the winter-break, he had 6 goals scored in the league and he became member of the youth team of the Republika Srpska official football team, and as such, he moved to Zvijezda 09.

He played with Zvijezda 09 in the first half of the 2016–17 First League of Republika Srpska (14 appearances, Bosnian second-level. During winter-break, he joined Serbian team FK Napredak Kruševac.

== International career ==
On 17 May 2018 he received a call for the Bosnia and Herzegovina national under-21 football team. and he debuted in a friendly game against Albania played on 28 May 2018, a 2–0 away win.
