= Igor Maksimović =

Serbian footballer

Personal information
- Date of birth: 31 July 1999 (age 27)
- Place of birth: Jagodina, Serbia, FR Yugoslavia
- Height: 1.65 m (5 ft 5 in)
- Position: Midfielder

Team information
- Current team: Sloven Ruma

Youth career
- 2012–2017: Partizan
- 2017–2018: Voždovac

Senior career*
Years	Team	Apps	(Gls)
2018–2019	Voždovac	11	(0)
2019	→ Inđija (loan)	8	(0)
2019–2021	Metalac Gornji Milanovac	59	(10)
2021–2022	Novi Pazar	24	(1)
2022–2024	Metalac Gornji Milanovac	62	(6)
2024	Sūduva	10	(0)
2025	Radnički Sremska Mitrovica	16	(3)
2025–	Sloven Ruma		

International career^{‡}
2015–2016	Serbia U17	9	(1)
2017–2018	Serbia U19	3	(1)
2020	Serbia U21	1	(0)
- * Club domestic league appearances and goals as of 25 June 2025 ‡ National team caps and goals as of September 2020

Igor Maksimović (born 31 July 1999) is a Serbian footballer who plays as a midfielder for Sloven Ruma.

== Club career ==
On 8 February 2019, Maksimović was loaned out from FK Voždovac to FK Inđija for the rest of the season.

In June 2024 he moved to Sūduva.

On June 26 he made his debut in A Lyga against FK Panevėžys. Panevėžys won 3-1.

== International career ==
Maksimović has played games for Serbia U16, Serbia U17, Serbia U18 and Serbia U19.

== Honours ==
Individual

- Serbian SuperLiga Player of the Week: 2020–21 (Round 31)
