= Mišo Dubljanić =

Montenegrin footballer

Personal information
- Full name: Mišo Dubljanić
- Date of birth: 20 December 1999 (age 26)
- Place of birth: Nikšić, FR Yugoslavia
- Height: 2.03 m (6 ft 8 in)
- Position: Goalkeeper

Team information
- Current team: Jedinstvo Ub
- Number: 99

Youth career
- –2018: Sutjeska Nikšić

Senior career*
Years	Team	Apps	(Gls)
2018	České Budějovice	0	(0)
2018	→ České Budějovice II		
2019–2023	Spartak Subotica	54	(0)
2023–	Jedinstvo Ub	22	(0)
- * Club domestic league appearances and goals as of 26 December 2024

Mišo Dubljanić (Serbian Cyrillic: Мишо Дубљанић; born 20 December 1999) is a Montenegrin professional footballer who plays as a goalkeeper for Serbian club Jedinstvo Ub.

== Club career ==
Born in Nikšić, he started playing in the youth levels of local FK Sutjeska Nikšić from where he moved to the Czech Republic to sign with SK Dynamo České Budějovice by early 2018. Failing to debut for the first team and playing mostly for the reserves team, Dubljanic decides to leave and sign with Serbian side FK Spartak Subotica. He debuted with Spartak in the 2019–20 Serbian SuperLiga and has surprisingly, due to his age, become their main goalkeeper that season.
