= Kaspars Svārups =

Latvian footballer

Personal information
- Date of birth: 28 January 1994 (age 32)
- Place of birth: Ventspils, Latvia
- Height: 1.91 m (6 ft 3 in)
- Position: Forward

Team information
- Current team: HIF-Stein

Youth career
- Tranzit
- 2012: → Rubin (loan)

Senior career*
Years	Team	Apps	(Gls)
2009–2010	Tranzit	19	(0)
2011–2012	Ventspils	52	(7)
2011–2017	→ Ventspils-2 (loan)	18	(6)
2013	→ Ilūkstes NSS (loan)	6	(1)
2013	→ Jūrmala (loan)	3	(0)
2014	→ Nadwiślan Góra (loan)	10	(2)
2017	Sortland IL	6	(5)
2018	Spartaks	23	(4)
2019–2020	Ventspils	52	(12)
2021	OFK Bačka	4	(0)
2021	TB Tvøroyri	6	(0)
2021–2023	Sambenedettese	13	(0)
2023	Ventspils	0	(0)
2023–	HIF-Stein	0	(0)

International career
2012	Latvia U19	3	(1)
2015–2016	Latvia U21	5	(0)
- * Club domestic league appearances and goals as of 29 January 2024

Kaspars Svārups (born 28 January 1994) is a Latvian professional footballer who plays as a forward for Norwegian club HIF-Stein.

== Career ==
In 2012, Svārups was sent on loan to the youth academy of Russian top flight side Rubin from Ventspils in Latvia.

Before the second half of 2013–14, he was sent on loan to Polish second division club Nadwiślan Góra.

In 2017, he signed for Sortland IL in the Norwegian fourth division.

Before the second half of 2020–21, Svārups signed for Serbian team Bačka.

On 26 October 2021, he was signed by Italian Serie D club Sambenedettese.
