= Modou Jobe (footballer, born 2000) =

Gambian footballer

Personal information
- Full name: Modou Jobe
- Date of birth: 13 June 2000 (age 26)
- Place of birth: The Gambia
- Height: 1.96 m (6 ft 5 in)
- Position: Forward

Youth career
- –2018: Superstars Academy
- 2018–2019: Hapoel Ramat Gan

Senior career*
Years	Team	Apps	(Gls)
2019–2020	Hapoel Ramat Gan	11	(0)
2020	Superstars		
2021	Inđija	10	(0)
- * Club domestic league appearances and goals as of 20 August 2021

Modou Jobe (born 13 June 2000) is a Gambian footballer.

== Club career ==
He is the product of Superstars Academy. He then spent two years in Israel with Hapoel Ramat Gan debuting in the Liga Leumit. He played back half year before joining Serbian SuperLiga side Inđija where he played the second half of the 2020-21 season. Having the club ended relegated Jobe was released in Summer 2021.
