= Lazar Tufegdžić =

Serbian footballer

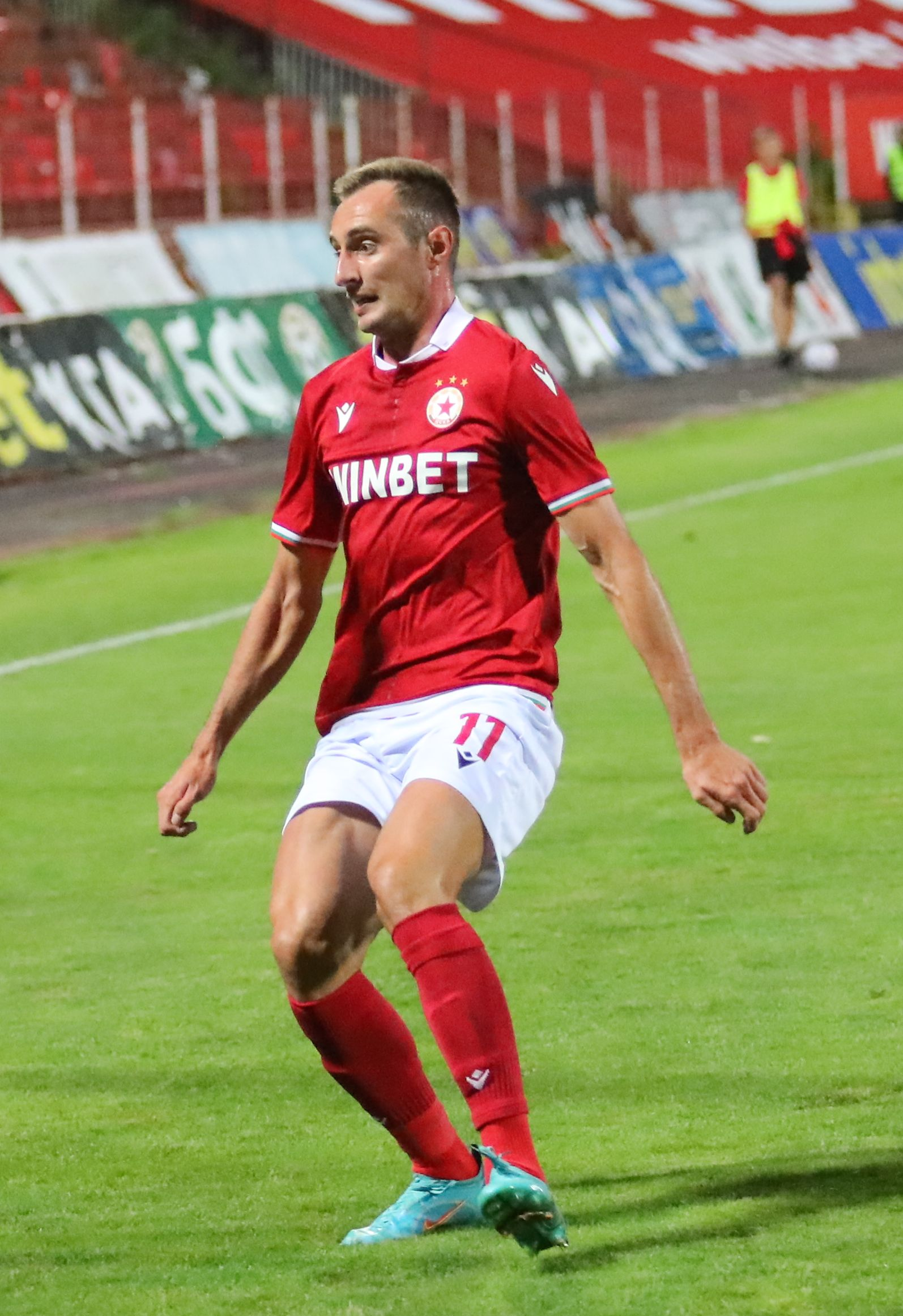
- Tufegdžić with CSKA Sofia in 2022

Personal information
- Full name: Lazar Tufegdžić
- Date of birth: 22 February 1997 (age 29)
- Place of birth: Valjevo, FR Yugoslavia
- Height: 1.85 m (6 ft 1 in)
- Position: Attacking midfielder

Team information
- Current team: Qingdao Hainiu
- Number: 32

Youth career
- 2012–2015: Red Star Belgrade

Senior career*
Years	Team	Apps	(Gls)
2015–2017	Red Star Belgrade	0	(0)
2016	→ Bežanija (loan)	13	(0)
2016	→ OFK Beograd (loan)	13	(2)
2017–2019	Sinđelić Beograd	64	(20)
2019–2022	Spartak Subotica	105	(31)
2022–2024	CSKA Sofia	31	(3)
2024–2026	Čukarički	52	(5)
2026–	Qingdao Hainiu	3	(0)

International career^{‡}
2014	Serbia U17	3	(0)
2021–	Serbia	2	(0)
- * Club domestic league appearances and goals as of 24 October 2026 ‡ National team caps and goals as of 29 January 2021

Lazar Tufegdžić (Serbian Cyrillic: Лазар Туфегџић; born 22 February 1997) is a Serbian professional footballer who plays as a attacking midfielder for Chinese Super League club Qingdao Hainiu.

== Club career ==
=== Red Star Belgrade ===
Born in Valjevo, passing youth categories, Tufegdžić played friendly matches against OFK Bor and FK Gračanica during the spring of 2015. He spent the summer pre-season and was also licensed for the first team of Red Star Belgrade in the 2015–16 Serbian SuperLiga season. In the winter break off-season, he was loaned to Bežanija until the end of season. In summer 2016, Tufegdžić was also licensed for the UEFA competitions, but later moved on one-year loan to OFK Beograd.

=== CSKA Sofia ===
In the summer of 2022 Tufegdžić joined Bulgarian team CSKA Sofia. Following a two-year stay with the "redmen", during which he made only sporadic appearances, he left the side in June 2024.

== International career ==
Tufegdžić was a member of Serbia U17 and Serbia U18 national team levels in 2014. He was capped twice by the senior team in 2021.

== Career statistics ==
=== Club ===
As of match played 24 October 2026

Appearances and goals by club, season and competition
Club	Season	League			Cup		Continental		Total	
Club	Season	Division	Apps	Goals	Apps	Goals	Apps	Goals	Apps	Goals
Bežanija (loan)	2015–16	Serbian First League	13	0	—		—		13	0
OFK Beograd (loan)	2016–17	Serbian First League	13	2	1	0	—		14	2
Sinđelić Beograd	2016–17	Serbian First League	15	7	0	0	—		15	7
Sinđelić Beograd	2017–18	Serbian First League	28	6	0	0	—		28	6
Sinđelić Beograd	2018–19	Serbian First League	21	7	2	0	—		23	7
Sinđelić Beograd	Total		64	20	2	0	—		66	20
Spartak Subotica	2018–19	Serbian SuperLiga	15	2	1	0	—		16	2
Spartak Subotica	2019–20	Serbian SuperLiga	24	6	0	0	—		24	6
Spartak Subotica	2020–21	Serbian SuperLiga	36	15	3	2	—		39	17
Spartak Subotica	2021–22	Serbian SuperLiga	30	8	1	0	—		31	8
Spartak Subotica	Total		105	31	5	2	—		110	33
CSKA Sofia	2022–23	Bulgarian First League	26	2	1	0	6 (Note: Appearances in UEFA Europa Conference League)	1	33	3
CSKA Sofia	2023–24	Bulgarian First League	5	1	0	0	0	0	5	1
CSKA Sofia	Total		31	3	1	0	6	1	38	4
Čukarički	2024–25	Serbian SuperLiga	29	3	1	1	—		30	4
Čukarički	2025–26	Serbian SuperLiga	23	2	0	0	—		23	2
Čukarički	Total		52	5	1	1	—		53	6
Qingdao Hainiu	2026	Chinese Super League	3	0	0	0	—		3	0
Career total			281	61	10	4	6	1	297	65

== Honours ==
Individual

- Serbian SuperLiga Player of the Week: 2020–21 (Round 2)
