= Miloš Zličić =

Serbian footballer

Personal information
- Date of birth: 29 December 1999 (age 26)
- Place of birth: Novi Sad, FR Yugoslavia
- Height: 1.83 m (6 ft 0 in)
- Position: Forward

Team information
- Current team: Mladost Bački Jarak

Youth career
- Vojvodina

Senior career*
Years	Team	Apps	(Gls)
2016–2019	Vojvodina	5	(0)
2018	→ ČSK Čelarevo (loan)	8	(0)
2018	→ Cement Beočin (loan)	16	(1)
2019	Hajduk 1912	12	(3)
2019	Bečej	15	(12)
2020–2021	OFK Bačka	34	(4)
2021	Sloboda Tuzla	6	(1)
2022–2023	Smederevo 1924		
2023	Tekstilac	8	(5)
2024	Trayal Kruševac	3	(0)
2024-2025	Radnički Zrenjanin		
2025-	Mladost Bački Jarak		

International career
2014	Serbia U15	3	(1)
2014–2015	Serbia U16	12	(5)
2015–2016	Serbia U17	2	(0)
2016–2017	Serbia U18	2	(1)
- * Club domestic league appearances and goals as of 4 December 2021

Miloš Zličić (Serbian Cyrillic: Милош Зличић; born 29 December 1999) is a Serbian football forward who plays for Mladost Bački Jarak. He is a younger brother of Lazar Zličić.

== Club career ==
=== Vojvodina ===
Born in Novi Sad, Zličić passed Vojvodina youth school and joined the first team at the age of 16. Previously, he was nominated for the best player of the "Tournament of Friendship", played in 2015. He made his senior debut in a friendly match against OFK Bačka during the spring half of the 2015–16 season, along with a year younger Mihajlo Nešković. Zličić made an official debut for Vojvodina in the 16th fixture of the 2016–17 Serbian SuperLiga season, played on 19 November 2016 against Novi Pazar.

==== Loan to Cement ====
In July 2018, Zličić joined the Serbian League Vojvodina side Cement Beočin on half-year loan deal. Zličić made his debut in an official match for Cement on 18 August, during the first round of the new season of the Serbian League Vojvodina, in a defeat against Omladinac. He scored his first senior goal on 25 August, in victory against Radnički.

== International career ==
Zličić was called up to the Serbia U15 national team squad during the 2014, and he also appeared for under-16 national team between 2014 and 2015. He was also a member of the U17 level later. After that, he was a member of the U18 level, and scored goal against Slovenia U18.

== Career statistics ==
As of 26 February 2020

Club	Season	League			Cup		Continental		Total	
Club	Season	Division	Apps	Goals	Apps	Goals	Apps	Goals	Apps	Goals
Vojvodina	2015–16	Serbian SuperLiga	0	0	0	0	–		0	0
Vojvodina	2016–17	Serbian SuperLiga	1	0	0	0	0	0	1	0
Vojvodina	2017–18	Serbian SuperLiga	4	0	0	0	0	0	4	0
Vojvodina	Total		5	0	0	0	0	0	5	0
ČSK Čelarevo (loan)	2017–18	Serbian First League	8	0	0	0	–		8	0
Cement Beočin (loan)	2018–19	Serbian League Vojvodina	16	1	–		–		16	1
Hajduk 1912	2018–19	Serbian League Vojvodina	12	3	–		–		12	3
Bečej	2019–20	Serbian League Vojvodina	15	12	–		–		15	12
Career total			56	16	0	0	0	0	56	16
