= Stefan Jovanović (footballer) =

Serbian footballer

Personal information
- Date of birth: 7 April 1994 (age 32)
- Place of birth: Kraljevo, FR Yugoslavia
- Height: 1.78 m (5 ft 10 in)
- Position: Right-back

Team information
- Current team: TSC
- Number: 22

Youth career
- Sloga Kraljevo

Senior career*
Years	Team	Apps	(Gls)
2013–2014	Bane	27	(2)
2014–2015	Zvižd	36	(1)
2016	Železničar Lajkovac	10	(1)
2016	Radnički Pirot	14	(0)
2017	Zemun	9	(0)
2018	Mladost Lučani	4	(0)
2018–2019	OFK Bačka	25	(0)
2019–2020	Proleter Novi Sad	8	(0)
2020–2021	OFK Bačka	27	(0)
2021–2024	Napredak Kruševac	91	(4)
2024–	TSC	60	(3)
- * Club domestic league appearances and goals as of 13 June 2026

Stefan Jovanović (Serbian Cyrillic: Стефан Јовановић; born 7 April 1994) is a Serbian professional footballer who plays as a right-back for TSC.

== Club career ==
Born in Kraljevo, Jovanović came throw the Sloga Kraljevo youth academy. He started his senior career with Bane in the 2013–14 season and later he moved to Zvižd, where he stayed until the end of 2015. At the beginning of 2016, Jovanović joined Železničar Lajkovac for the rest of 2015–16 season. In summer same year, Jovanović signed with the Serbian First League side Radnički Pirot. After a half-season with the club, Jovanović moved to Zemun during the winter-break.

On 4 June 2021, he signed a two-year contract with Napredak Kruševac.

== Career statistics ==
As of 20 June 2018

Appearances and goals by club, season and competition
Club	Season	League			Cup		Continental		Other		Total	
Club	Season	Division	Apps	Goals	Apps	Goals	Apps	Goals	Apps	Goals	Apps	Goals
Bane	2013–14	Serbian League West	27	2	—		—		—		27	2
Zvižd	2014–15	Serbian League West	22	0	—		—		—		22	0
Zvižd	2015–16	Serbian League West	14	1	—		—		—		14	1
Železničar Lajkovac	2015–16	Serbian League West	10	1	—		—		—		10	1
Radnički Pirot	2016–17	Serbian First League	14	0	—		—		1 (Note: Appearance in Southern and Eastern Serbia Cup)	0	15	0
Zemun	2016–17	Serbian First League	6	0	0	0	—		—		6	0
Zemun	2017–18	Serbian SuperLiga	3	0	0	0	—		—		3	0
Career total			96	4	0	0	—		1	0	97	4
