= Milan Makarić =

Serbian footballer (born 1995)

Personal information
- Date of birth: 4 October 1995 (age 31)
- Place of birth: Novi Sad, FR Yugoslavia
- Height: 1.85 m (6 ft 1 in)
- Position: Forward

Team information
- Current team: Haiphong
- Number: 9

Youth career
- Vojvodina

Senior career*
Years	Team	Apps	(Gls)
2014–2015	Vojvodina	15	(2)
2014	→ Proleter Novi Sad (loan)	10	(0)
2015–2016	Spartak Subotica	28	(6)
2017	OFK Bačka	32	(2)
2018	Zvijezda 09	14	(3)
2018–2019	OFK Bačka	31	(5)
2019	Radnički Niš	0	(0)
2019–2021	Radnik Surdulica	62	(33)
2021–2024	AaB	38	(8)
2023	→ Radnik Surdulica (loan)	18	(0)
2023–2024	→ Borac Banja Luka (loan)	23	(4)
2024–2025	Hapoel Tel Aviv	26	(10)
2025–2026	SHB Da Nang	23	(11)
2026–	Haiphong	8	(8)

International career^{‡}
2015	Serbia U20	4	(0)
2015	Serbia U23	1	(0)
2021	Serbia	3	(0)
- * Club domestic league appearances and goals as of 21 November 2026 ‡ National team caps and goals as of 11 June 2021

Milan Makarić (Serbian Cyrillic: Милан Макарић; born 4 October 1995) is a Serbian professional footballer who plays as a forward for V.League 1 club Haiphong.

== Club career ==
In the 2020–21 Serbian SuperLiga, Makarić finished as the top scorer, netting 25 goals.

In August 2025, Makarić moved to Vietnam, signing for V.League 1 club SHB Da Nang.

After one season at SHB Da Nang, Makarić was transferred to league fellow Haiphong.

== International career ==
He played for Serbia in three friendly matches in 2021.

== Playing style ==
He started off in a central midfield role early in his career, before being moved into centre-forward position in which he now usually plays.

== Career statistics ==
As of 11 June 2021

Serbia
Year	Apps	Goals
2021	3	0
Total	3	0

== Honours ==
Borac Banja Luka

- Bosnian Premier League: 2023–24

Individual

- Serbian SuperLiga Top goalscorer: 2020–21
