= Danilo Radjen =

American soccer player (born 1994)

Personal information
- Date of birth: June 22, 1994 (age 32)
- Place of birth: Cleveland, Ohio, United States
- Height: 6 ft 2 in (1.88 m)
- Position: Centre-back

College career
Years	Team	Apps	(Gls)
2012–2013	Cleveland State Vikings	36	(0)
2014–2016	Akron Zips	30	(0)

Senior career*
Years	Team	Apps	(Gls)
2014	West Virginia Chaos	10	(0)
2017	New York Cosmos	0	(0)
2017	New York Cosmos B	15	(0)
2019–2020	Partizan	0	(0)
2019–2020	→ Teleoptik (loan)	15	(0)
2020–2021	Bačka Bačka Palanka	21	(0)
2021–2022	Borec Veles	21	(0)
2023	Iskra Danilovgrad	13	(2)
- * Club domestic league appearances and goals as of October 17, 2024

Danilo Radjen (born June 22, 1994) is an American professional soccer player.

== Career ==
=== College and amateur ===
Radjen began playing college soccer at Cleveland State University in 2012, where he played for two seasons and making 36 appearances for the Vikings and was named Horizon League All-Newcomer Team in his freshman season. He transferred to the University of Akron in 2013. Radjen missed most of the 2014 season due to injury, but played for two further seasons and made 30 appearances for the Zips, as well as being named Academic All-Mid American Conference in 2015 and 2016.

Whilst at college, Radjen spent a season in the USL PDL with West Virginia Chaos.

=== Professional ===
==== MLS SuperDraft ====
On January 13, 2017, Radjen was selected 36th overall in the 2017 MLS SuperDraft by Houston Dynamo. However, he did not sign with the team.

==== New York Cosmos ====
In April 2017, Radjen was announced as being on the roster for side New York Cosmos who played in the via their first team who competed in the NASL. He made 15 appearances for the Cosmos reserve team in 2017, but didn't appear for the first team.

==== FK Partizan ====
Following a year out of the game, Radjen signed with Serbian SuperLiga side FK Partizan and was soon loaned to newly promoted Serbian First League side FK Teleoptik for the season on July 15, 2020.

==== OFK Bačka ====
After a season with Teleoptik, Radjen signed a one-year deal with Serbian SuperLiga club OFK Bačka on July 31, 2020. He made his debut for the club on September 13, 2020, appearing as an injury-time substitute during a 2–1 loss to Mladost Lučani.

=== Borec ===
In August 2021, Radjen signed with 1. MFL side Borec. A hand injury that needed to be operated on made him sit out the last two months of the season. Radjen was given team of the week honors multiple times during the season.
