= Andrija Rajović =

Danish footballer (born 2001)

Personal information
- Date of birth: 7 September 2001 (age 25)
- Place of birth: Copenhagen, Denmark
- Height: 1.80 m (5 ft 11 in)
- Position: Midfielder

Team information
- Current team: GOŠK Gabela
- Number: 38

Youth career
- –2019: Red Star Belgrade

Senior career*
Years	Team	Apps	(Gls)
2019–2020	Hvidovre IF		
2020	Zvijezda 09	11	(1)
2021	Spartak Subotica	9	(0)
2021	Rudar Prijedor	2	(0)
2022	Spartak Subotica	8	(0)
2022–2023	Iskra Danilovgrad	7	(0)
2023–	GOŠK Gabela	4	(0)
- * Club domestic league appearances and goals as of 21:19, 17 January 2024 (UTC)

Andrija Rajović (born 7 September 2001) is a Danish professional footballer who plays as a midfielder for Bosnian club NK GOŠK Gabela.
