= Nikola Žakula =

Serbian footballer

Personal information
- Date of birth: 18 August 1992 (age 34)
- Place of birth: Belgrade, FR Yugoslavia
- Height: 1.91 m (6 ft 3 in)
- Position: Defensive midfielder

Team information
- Current team: Jedinstvo Stara Pazova

Senior career*
Years	Team	Apps	(Gls)
2010–2011	Železničar Beograd		
2012–2013	Jedinstvo Stara Pazova	28	(7)
2013–2014	Novi Sad	28	(2)
2014	Dunav Stari Banovci	14	(3)
2015–2016	ČSK Čelarevo	46	(6)
2017–2018	Radnik Surdulica	35	(2)
2018	Mačva Šabac	2	(0)
2019–2021	OFK Bačka	64	(14)
2021–2022	Inđija	34	(7)
2022–2024	Metalac Gornji Milanovac	41	(2)
2024-	Jedinstvo Stara Pazova		
- * Club domestic league appearances and goals as of 26 December 2023

Nikola Žakula (Serbian Cyrillic: Никола Жакула; born 18 August 1992) is a Serbian footballer who plays for Jedinstvo Stara Pazova.

== Club career ==
Žakula started his career with football club Železničar Beograd, where he played between 2010 and 2011. Later he played for a period with Jedinstvo Stara Pazova in the Vojvodina League West and Serbian League Vojvodina. Next he also in the same league rank played as a member of RFK Novi Sad, Dunav Stari Banovci and ČSK Čelarevo. Scoring 5 goals on 15 league matches, Žakula helped ČSK to win the first place and make promotion to the 2015–16 Serbian First League. At the beginning of 2017, Žakula signed a three-year contract with the Serbian SuperLiga side Radnik Surdulica, along with teammate Mladen Vukasović. In the first friendly match for new club, Žakula score two goals against Radnički Pirot.

== Career statistics ==
As of 12 June 2018

Appearances and goals by club, season and competition
Club	Season	League			Cup		Continental		Other		Total	
Club	Season	Division	Apps	Goals	Apps	Goals	Apps	Goals	Apps	Goals	Apps	Goals
Jedinstvo Stara Pazova	2012–13	Serbian League Vojvodina	28	7	—		—		—		28	7
Novi Sad	2013–14	Serbian League Vojvodina	28	2	—		—		—		28	2
Dunav Stari Banovci	2014–15	Serbian League Vojvodina	14	3	—		—		—		14	3
ČSK Čelarevo	2014–15	Serbian League Vojvodina	15	5	—		—		—		15	5
ČSK Čelarevo	2015–16	Serbian First League	17	0	2 (Note: Including preliminary round match against Mačva Šabac)	0	—		1 (Note: Including final round of the FA Vojvodina cup against Dolina Padina)	0	19	0
ČSK Čelarevo	2016–17	Serbian First League	14	1	1	0	—		—		15	1
ČSK Čelarevo	Total		46	6	3	0	—		1	0	50	6
Radnik Surdulica	2016–17	Serbian SuperLiga	9	0	—		—		—		9	0
Radnik Surdulica	2017–18	Serbian SuperLiga	26	2	1	0	—		—		27	2
Radnik Surdulica	Total		35	2	1	0	—		—		36	2
Career total			151	20	4	0	—		1	0	156	20

== Honours ==
ČSK Čelarevo

- Serbian League Vojvodina: 2014–15
