= Djuro Zec =

Serbian footballer

Đuro Zec
Personal information
- Date of birth: 6 March 1990 (age 36)
- Place of birth: Novi Sad, SR Serbia, SFR Yugoslavia
- Height: 1.80 m (5 ft 11 in)
- Position: Right winger

Team information
- Current team: Mladost Bački Jarak

Youth career
- 1996–2004: TSK Temerin
- 2004–2006: Vojvodina
- 2006–2008: TSK Temerin

Senior career*
Years	Team	Apps	(Gls)
2008–2009	ČSK Čelarevo	16	(1)
2008–2009	→ Mladost Bački Jarak (loan)	28	(5)
2010–2011	Srem	50	(3)
2011–2012	Proleter Novi Sad	45	(4)
2013–2014	Donji Srem	56	(7)
2015–2016	Borac Čačak	26	(6)
2016–2017	Voždovac	49	(3)
2018	Napredak Kruševac	29	(3)
2019	Krupa	10	(0)
2019	Napredak Kruševac	19	(4)
2020–2021	TSC	62	(22)
2022	Hanoi	3	(0)
2023–2024	Radnički Niš	8	(0)
2025	Mladost Lučani	5	(0)
2025–	Mladost Bački Jarak		
- * Club domestic league appearances and goals as of 15 June 2025

Đuro Zec (Serbian Cyrillic: Ђуро Зец; born 6 March 1990) is a Serbian professional footballer who plays as a right winger for Serbian club Mladost Bački Jarak.

== Honours ==
Individual

- Serbian SuperLiga Player of the Week: 2020–21 (Round 23)
