= Nenad Vanić =

Serbian football manager and player

Personal information
- Date of birth: 30 August 1970 (age 56)
- Place of birth: Pristina, SR Serbia, SFR Yugoslavia
- Height: 1.85 m (6 ft 1 in)
- Positions: Defender; midfielder

Senior career*
Years	Team	Apps	(Gls)
1992–1993	Budućnost Valjevo		
1993–1996	Mladost Lučani		
1996–1997	Red Star Belgrade	30	(2)
1997	Vojvodina	2	(0)
1997–2000	Albacete	74	(8)
2000–2001	Lokeren	33	(6)
2001–2003	Gent	44	(11)
2003	Tianjin TEDA		
2004	Borac Čačak	15	(1)
2004–2005	Obilić	41	(4)
2006	BASK	14	(3)
2006–2008	Bežanija	44	(3)
2009	Bežanija	16	(1)
Total		313	(39)

Managerial career
- 2010–2013: Radnički Nova Pazova
- 2013–2014: Sloga Petrovac
- 2014: Donji Srem
- 2015: Bežanija
- 2015–2017: Metalac Gornji Milanovac
- 2017: Vojvodina
- 2018: Proleter Novi Sad
- 2018–2019: Hatta
- 2019: Radnik Surdulica
- 2021: OFK Bačka
- 2024–2026: Hatta
- * Club domestic league appearances and goals

Nenad Vanić (Serbian Cyrillic: Ненад Ванић; born 30 August 1970) is a Serbian football manager and former player.

== Playing career ==
In the summer of 1997, following a brief spell at Vojvodina, Vanić moved abroad and signed with Spanish club Albacete. He spent the next three seasons there, before moving to Belgian side Lokeren. After a year at Daknamstadion, Vanić switched to fellow league club Gent. He amassed 77 appearances and scored 17 goals in the top flight of Belgian football between 2000 and 2003. Subsequently, Vanić briefly played for Chinese side Tianjin TEDA, before returning to his homeland and joining Borac Čačak in early 2004.

== Managerial career ==
Shortly after retiring from playing, Vanić took over as manager of Radnički Nova Pazova in early 2010. He led the club to win the Serbian League Vojvodina in 2012, thus earning promotion to the Serbian First League.

In May 2015, Vanić became manager of Metalac Gornji Milanovac. He subsequently led the club to victory against Napredak Kruševac in the promotion playoffs, thus securing a spot in the 2015–16 Serbian SuperLiga.

In March 2024, Vanić was appointed as manager of UAE Pro League club Hatta.

== Honours ==
=== Player ===
Red Star Belgrade

- FR Yugoslavia Cup: 1996–97

=== Manager ===
Radnički Nova Pazova

- Serbian League Vojvodina: 2011–12

Proleter Novi Sad

- Serbian First League: 2017–18

== See also ==
- Football in Serbia
