= Filip Mitrović (footballer) =

Montenegrin footballer

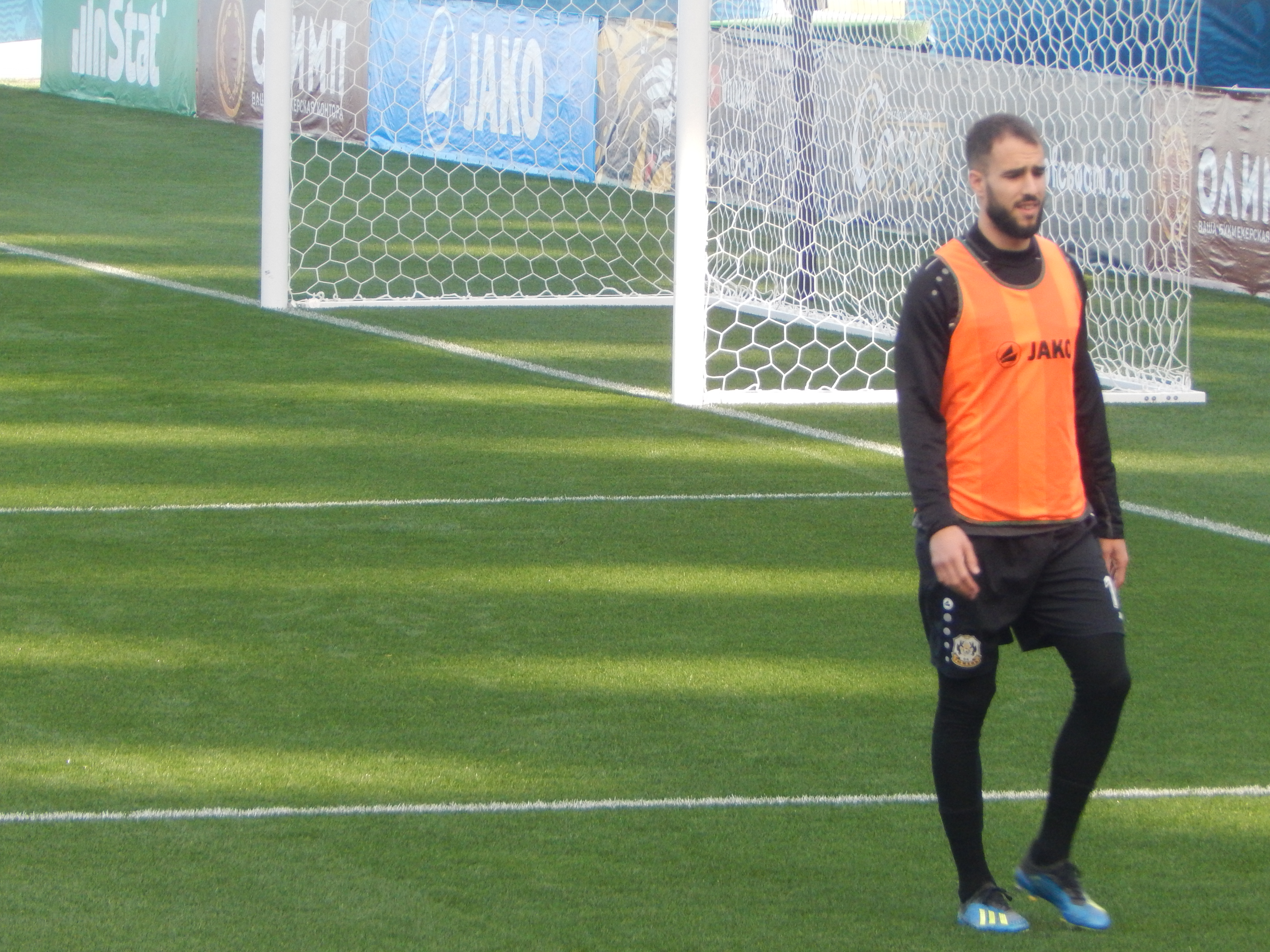

Personal information
- Date of birth: 17 November 1993 (age 32)
- Place of birth: Podgorica, FR Yugoslavia
- Height: 1.86 m (6 ft 1 in)
- Position: Centre back

Team information
- Current team: Mornar
- Number: 16

Senior career*
Years	Team	Apps	(Gls)
2011–2014	Mladost Podgorica	44	(1)
2014–2015	Bokelj	2	(0)
2015	Mogren	16	(0)
2015–2018	Budućnost Podgorica	43	(1)
2018	Rudar Pljevlja	15	(1)
2019	Tyumen	1	(0)
2019	Chindia Târgoviște	0	(0)
2019	Novi Pazar	6	(0)
2020	Kom Podgorica	13	(1)
2020–2021	Sutjeska Nikšić	6	(0)
2021	OFK Bačka	7	(0)
2021–2022	Sutjeska Nikšić	13	(1)
2022–2023	FK Iskra	25	(0)
2023–	Mornar	64	(1)

International career
2012–2013	Montenegro U21	4	(0)
- * Club domestic league appearances and goals as of 1 June 2026

Filip Mitrović (born 17 November 1993) is a Montenegrin football player who plays for Mornar.

== Club career ==
He made his debut in the Russian Football National League for FC Tyumen on 10 March 2019 in a game against FC Tambov.
