= GFK Sloven Ruma =

Association football club in Ruma, Serbia

Sloven
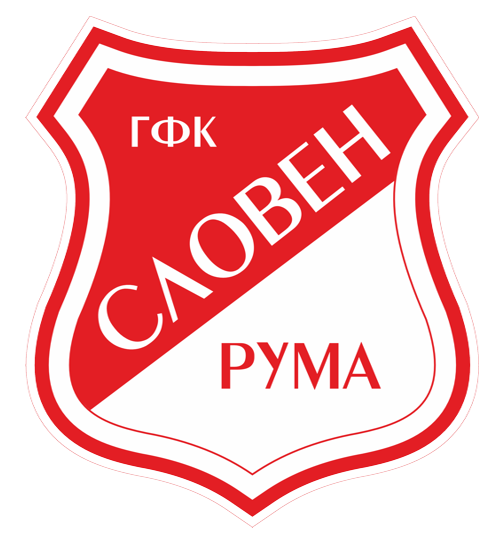
- Full name: Gradski Fudbalski Klub Sloven Ruma
- Founded: 1924; 102 years ago
- Ground: Stadium Sloven
- Capacity: 1,000
- President: Milorad Batalo
- Head coach: Dejan Rađenović
- League: Serbian League Vojvodina
- 2024–25: Serbian First League, 14th of 16
- Website: gfksloven.rs
Home colours	Away colours

GFK Sloven Ruma is a Serbian football club from Ruma that competes in Serbian League Vojvodina, the third tier of the Serbian football pyramid.

== History ==
The club was founded in 1924.

From 1959 to 1977, Sloven played for 18 years without interruption in the third tier of Yugoslav football, the Vojvodina League, i.e. the Northern Group of the Serbian League.

Sloven came closest to being placed in the federal competition in the 1965/66 season. At the end of the season, Sloven was tied at the top of the table with FK Crvenka with 43 points. However, due to a slightly better goal difference, Crvenka took first place and thus directly qualified for the Eastern Group of the Yugoslav Second League. Crvenka reached the First League a few seasons later, and Sloven continued to compete in the third tier with solid success until 1977, but never repeated the result of 1966.

After several years of playing in the fourth tier (Srem district league and Vojvodina zone league), Sloven again reached the third tier as a member of the Serbian League of Vojvodina in the 1995/96 season. After five seasons of competition with mediocre results, he was relegated to the Vojvodina zone.

The last time Sloven returned to the Serbian League was in the 2007/08 season. After winning a high fifth place, the following season 2008/09. finished as the last and was relegated to the Vojvodina League and after only one year to the Regional League of Sremska Mitrovica. Sloven spent more than a decade playing in the Regional League, and in one season he even fell to the local inter-municipal league (sixth ranking competition in Serbia).

In the course of 2020, the results recovery of the club began. At the end of the 2021/22 season, Sloven won first place in the Regional Football League of Srem and placed in the Vojvodina League South, from where they returned to the Serbian League Vojvodina after just one season.

In the 2023/24 season, Sloven took second place in the table of the Serbian League Vojvodina, behind Železničar Inđija. Due to the administrative failure of the club from Inđija, Sloven took their place and thus, for the first time in the history of the club, ensured participation in the federal level, the Serbian First League.

=== Recent league history ===
Season	Division	P	W	D	L	F	A	Pts	Pos
2020–21	6 - PFL Sremska Mitrovica	34	20	8	6	72	26	68	3rd
2021–22	5 - Srem League	30	24	5	1	95	11	77	1st
2022–23	4 - Vojvodina League South	30	19	5	6	66	22	62	2nd
2023–24	3 - Serbian League Vojvodina	30	18	4	8	61	31	58	2nd
2024–25	2 - Serbian First League	37	8	15	14	31	44	39	14th

== Stadium ==
Sloven plays its matches at the Stadium in Borkovačka dolina, on the way to Lake Borkovac, a famous Romanian picnic spot. The stadium was renovated at the end of 2020, has floodlights and one tribune with chairs.

== Current squad ==
As of 24 February 2025

Note: Flags indicate national team as defined under FIFA eligibility rules; some limited exceptions apply. Players may hold more than one non-FIFA nationality.

No.	Pos.	Nation	Player
1	GK	SRB	Matija Šegavac
2	DF	SRB	Aleksa Koloni (on loan from Čukarički)
3	DF	SRB	Nikola Radović
4	DF	SRB	Srđan Oparušić
5	DF	SRB	Stefan Vilotić
6	MF	SRB	Saša Tomanović
7	FW	SRB	Vladimir Jandrić
8	MF	SRB	Milivoje Marinković
9	FW	SRB	Brana Ilić (captain)
10	MF	SRB	Dragan Perošević
11	DF	SRB	Vladimir Ilić
14	DF	SRB	Boško Trivić
15	MF	SRB	Luka Radivojević
16	FW	SRB	Aleksa Preradov (on loan from TSC)
17	FW	SRB	Lazar Vrekić

No.	Pos.	Nation	Player
18	FW	NGA	Prince Benjamin Obasi (dual registration with OFK Beograd)
19	FW	SRB	Jovan Mitrović
20	MF	SRB	Ognjen Lovrić
21	DF	SRB	Miloš Ostojić
22	FW	SRB	Lazar Milošev
23	MF	SRB	Ognjen Abramušić
24	FW	SRB	Mitar Ergelaš (on loan from Čukarički)
25	GK	SRB	Mihailo Dragičević
26	MF	SRB	Edin Ajdinović
27	FW	SRB	Filip Avrić
28	MF	SRB	Vanja Đošić
29	FW	SRB	Marko Arsović (on loan from Čukarički)
30	GK	SRB	Miloš Ostojić
33	DF	SRB	Ivan Josović
55	MF	SRB	Ognjen Dimitrić

=== Out on loan ===
Note: Flags indicate national team as defined under FIFA eligibility rules; some limited exceptions apply. Players may hold more than one non-FIFA nationality.

No.	Pos.	Nation	Player

For the list of former and current players with Wikipedia article, please see: Category:GFK Sloven Ruma players.
