= Saša Tomanović =

Serbian footballer

Personal information
- Full name: Saša Tomanović
- Date of birth: 20 September 1989 (age 37)
- Place of birth: Sombor, SR Serbia, SFR Yugoslavia
- Height: 1.91 m (6 ft 3 in)
- Position: Midfielder

Team information
- Current team: Sloven
- Number: 6

Senior career*
Years	Team	Apps	(Gls)
2007–2009	Mladost Apatin	25	(2)
2009–2011	Inđija	11	(0)
2010–2011	→ Radnički Sombor (loan)	16	(4)
2011–2012	Radnički Sombor	29	(4)
2012–2013	Inđija	43	(4)
2014	PIK Prigrevica	13	(5)
2015	Inđija	28	(3)
2016	Mladost Podgorica	13	(0)
2016–2017	Javor Ivanjica	31	(0)
2017–2022	TSC	173	(24)
2023	Železničar Pančevo	16	(1)
2023–2024	Zvijezda 09	25	(1)
2024–	Sloven Ruma	31	(1)
- * Club domestic league appearances and goals as of 25 June 2025

Saša Tomanović (Serbian Cyrillic: Саша Томановић; born 20 September 1989) is a Serbian professional footballer who plays as a midfielder for Sloven Ruma.
