= Jevgēņijs Kazačoks =

Latvian footballer

Personal information
- Date of birth: 12 August 1995 (age 31)
- Place of birth: Liepāja, Latvia
- Height: 1.76 m (5 ft 9 1/2 in)
- Position: Midfielder

Team information
- Current team: Årdal
- Number: 9

Youth career
- –2013: Liepājas Metalurgs

Senior career*
Years	Team	Apps	(Gls)
2013–2017	Spartaks Jūrmala	118	(19)
2018	RFS	10	(0)
2019	Ventspils	23	(3)
2020	Jelgava	20	(0)
2021	OFK Bačka	7	(0)
2021	Oskarshamn	10	(0)
2022	Nordvärmland	24	(20)
2023	Mosjøen IL	24	(9)
2024–	Årdal	0	(0)

International career
2010	Latvia U16	1	(0)
2011	Latvia U17	3	(0)
2012–2013	Latvia U18	3	(0)
2012–2013	Latvia U19	7	(3)
2013–2016	Latvia U21	23	(5)
2017–2018	Latvia	9	(0)
- * Club domestic league appearances and goals as of 21:08, 17 June 2023 (UTC)

Jevgēņijs Kazačoks (born 12 August 1995) is a Latvian footballer who plays for Norwegian club Årdal.

== International ==
He made his debut for the Latvia national football team on 9 June 2017 in a World Cup qualifier group game against Portugal.
