= Slavko Maletin Vava Stadium =

Football stadium in Serbia

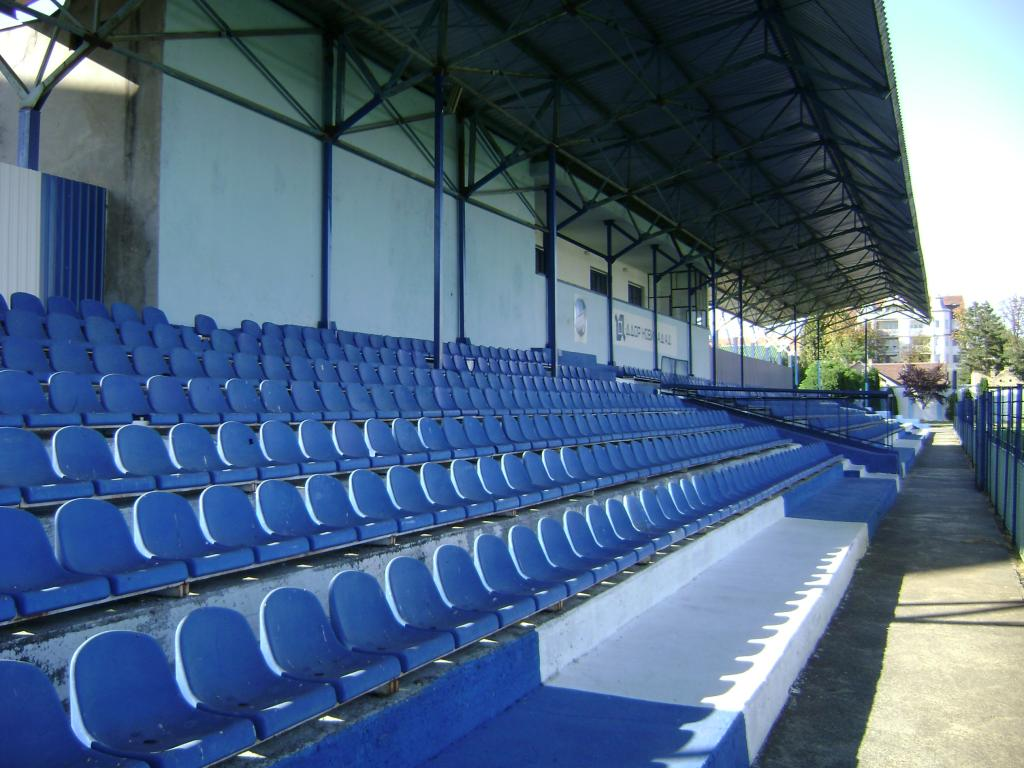
- Interactive map of Slavko Maletin Vava Stadium
- Location: Bačka Palanka, Serbia
- Coordinates: 45°14′25″N 19°22′54″E
- Operator: OFK Bačka
- Capacity: 5,500
- Surface: Grass

Construction
- Opened: 7 July 1947; 79 years ago

Tenant
- OFK Bačka

Slavko Maletin Vava Stadium is a football stadium in Bačka Palanka, Serbia. Its tenant is OFK Bačka. The stadium has the capacity to hold 5,500 spectators.

== History ==
The stadium was officially inaugurated on 7 July 1951. The first ground of Bačka was next to the old railway station. As the club popularity grew, the stadium was relocated to the city center where it still stands.

The stadium is named after Slavko Maletin Vava, a former player of Bačka in the 60s and early 70s of the 20th century.

== Description ==
The stadium has a capacity for 4,000 spectators. The west Stand was completely covered and all of the sitting. The east Stand was standing and is not covered. The stadium is located in the exclusive area. On 20-odd meters from the stadium is the town center and pedestrian zone .

== Largest attended ==
Bačka Stadium has always usually been well attended. The largest attendance in the stadium of Bačka was on 12 March 1969, when Bačka played against Split Hajduk in the quarter-finals of the Yugoslav Cup. At that time, the stadium was attended by over 10,000 spectators.

== See also ==
- List of stadiums in Serbia
