= Inđija Stadium =

Sports venue in Inđija, Serbia

Coordinates: 45°03′00″N 20°05′24″E

- TOYO Tires Arena
- Interactive map of Inđija Stadium
- Location: Inđija, Serbia
- Owner: FK Inđija
- Capacity: 4,000
- Surface: Grass
- Field size: 132m x 112m

Construction
- Opened: 1933
- Renovated: 2006

Tenant
- FK Inđija

Inđija Stadium is a sports stadium in Inđija, Serbia, used primarily for association football.

== History ==
The stadium was opened in 1933. Right after the founding of Železničar Inđija, the predecessor of FK Inđija, the pitch was closed off with a fence and covered wooden seats were built. The capacity was about 600 seats. A Changeroom as part of the stadium wasn't built until 1962. Until then the Changeroom was in a Sport cafe across the stadium. The wooden seats were replaced with plastic seats in 1970. In 2006 the stadium was renovated. The old removable stand was replaced with a new, modern stand equipped with plastic seats.

After the renovation in 2006, the stadium could hold between 4,000 and 5,000 people. For security measures and for the comfort of the viewers, the capacity was reduced to 3,500 seats.

== Plans ==
In 2006, FK Inđija presented plans for a new stadium at Inđijska Leja with a capacity of 9,000 plastic seats. The stadium was intended to meet the needs of athletes in the town of Inđija and to support the club's goal of reaching the first league.
