= OFK Bačka =

Association football club in Bačka Palanka. Serbia

- Full name: Omladinski fudbalski klub Bačka
- Nickname: Plavi sa Dunava (The Blues from the Danube)
- Founded: 1945; 81 years ago
- Ground: Stadion Slavko Maletin Vava
- Capacity: 2,500
- Chairman: Marjan Rnić
- Manager: Goran Zekić
- League: Serbian League Vojvodina
- 2024–25: Vojvodina League North, 1st (promoted)
- Website: ofkbacka.com
Home colours	Away colours

OFK Bačka (Serbian Cyrillic: ОФК Бачка) is a football club based in Bačka Palanka, Serbia, that competes in the Serbian League Vojvodina. In 2016, the club achieved promotion to the Serbian SuperLiga. It is known as one of the most successful football clubs in Serbia at the all-time table of the Yugoslav Second League.

== Origins and rise ==
The club was founded in 1945 and plays in the stadium Stadion Slavko Maletin Vava, capacity of 2,500, which was officially inaugurated on 7 July 1951. In 1959, Bačka achieved promotion to the Yugoslav Second League group East, but, at the end of the 1959–60 season, ended up being relegated. However, a bright sign was that Bačka striker Petar Remete became league top-scorer in 1960. Bačka returned to Second League in the 1961–62 season and this time stayed in the national second level for 14 consecutive years.

Its major accomplishment was the promotion to the 1988–89 Yugoslav Second League which was a unified second league. This edition of the Second League, compared to the previous ones Bačka played in, was stronger because it was a unified Second League in which clubs from all over Yugoslavia played, thus it was more restricted and difficult to qualify for, while the other editions from the 1960s and 1970s had the Second League divided into two groups, East and West. In total, during the Yugoslav period, Baćka spent 16 seasons in the Second League.

In the Yugoslav Cup, Bačka best performance was in the 1968–69 edition when Bačka reached the quarter-finals, not advancing further because they were stopped by one of the Yugoslav "Big Four", Hajduk Split, who got to eliminate Bačka by 2–1 only after extra-time. Bačka managed to qualify to the final stages of the national cup on several occasions, the next being in the 1993–94 FR Yugoslavia Cup when they lost in the last 16 against Radnički Niš.

After the 1988–89 season in the Second League, during the following two decades, the club played mostly in the third national level, the Serbian League Vojvodina, occasionally dropping to the Bačka Zone League at times when the financial crisis in the club was more notorious.

== Recent history ==
The rise started when Bačka won the 2012–13 Vojvodina League West. Immediately afterwards, Bačka won the 2013–14 Serbian League Vojvodina thus qualifying to the Serbian First League, the second national level. It only took two seasons in the first league for Bačka to finish second in the 2015–16 edition and this way directly qualified for the Serbian SuperLiga. The 2016–17 Serbian SuperLiga was the first time in the club's history that Bačka played in the national top level. Soon after they were relegated, but did manage to secure promotion back to the Serbian SuperLiga by claiming 3rd spot in the 2019–20 Serbian First League.

=== Recent league history ===
Season	Division	P	W	D	L	F	A	Pts	Pos
2020–21	1 - Serbian SuperLiga	38	3	7	28	24	68	16	20th
2021–22	2 - Serbian First League	30	6	15	9	22	30	33	15th
2022–23	3 - Serbian League Vojvodina	28	7	8	13	25	35	29	13th
2023–24	3 - Serbian League Vojvodina	30	5	7	18	25	52	22	16th
2024–25	4 - Vojvodina League North	30	25	3	2	73	17	78	1st

== Name ==
The name of the club always was FK Bačka. It comes from the region of Bačka where the city Bačka Palanka is located. The club should not be confused with another ones with same name, like FK Bačka 1901 or FK Bačka Mol, or another with similar name, FK TSC (formerly FK Bačka Topola). OFK Bačka never played in Yugoslav highest level, but in 2016 got to be promoted to the Serbian SuperLiga. In summer 2015, club name changed to OFK Bačka.

== Honors ==
- Serbian League Vojvodina
  - Champions: 2013–14
- Vojvodina League West
  - Champions: 2012–13

== Stadium ==
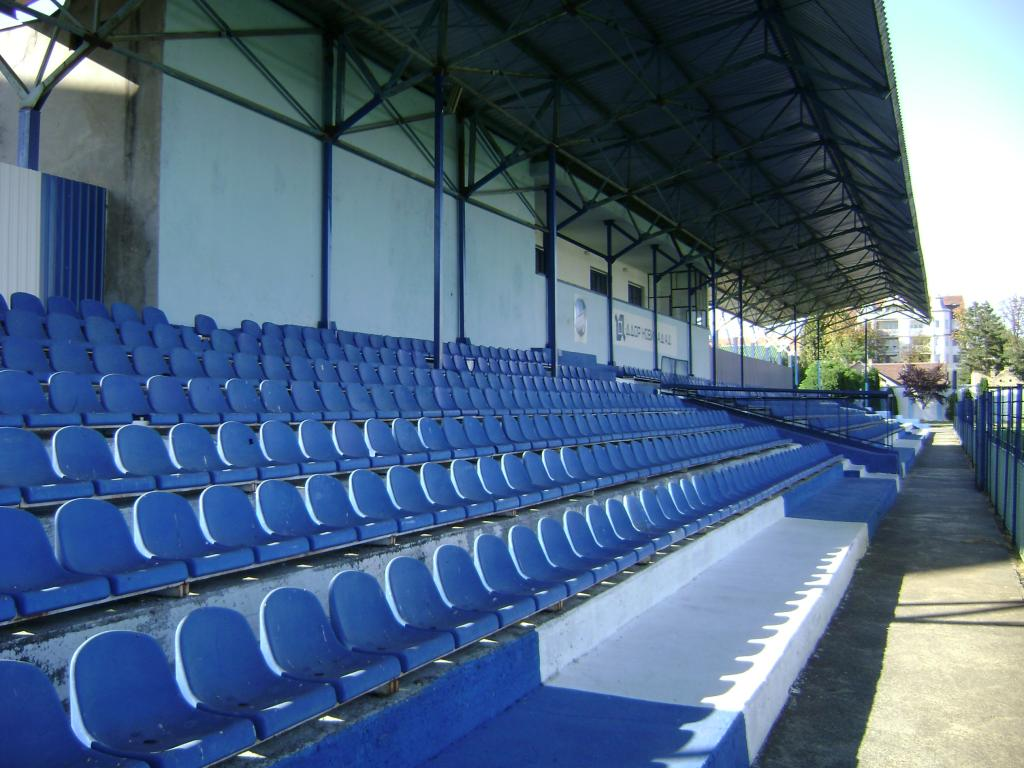
Slavko Maletin Vava Stadium west stand

The Bačka stadium, known as Stadion Slavko Maletin Vava, was inaugurated on the date the city of Bačka Palanka celebrates its slava, July 7, 1951. It has a capacity of 5,500. The west stand is completely covered while the east stand is not. The stadium is located in downtown of Bačka Palanka.

The first field where FK Bačka played was where the old railway station was located. As the club was growing and gaining popularity, a decision was made to relocate the stadium from the outskirts to the city center where it still stands. Its location is in an exclusive part of the town, 20 meters from the city center and the pedestrian area.

The stadium is known for its high attendance. The biggest one recorded was on March 12, 1969, in a Yugoslav Cup quarter-finals game against Hajduk Split, when 10.000 spectators were present inside.

== Players ==
=== Notable former players ===
- (Latvia) Jevgēņijs Kazačoks
- (Serbia) Igor Đurić
- (Serbia) Marko Klisura
- (Serbia) Milan Makarić
- (Serbia) Veseljko Trivunović
- (Socialist Federal Republic of Yugoslavia) Lazar Lemić

For the list of all current and former players with Wikipedia article, please see: Category:OFK Bačka players.

== Coaches ==
In April 1947 Bačka got his first professional coach, Vladimir Jurak from Zagreb, and ever since a number of paid professional coaches came, like Ilija Ranković from Belgrade, László Bozóky from Hungary, Josip Takač from Subotica and Gojko Džepina from Belgrade.

== Fans ==
In addition to a number of audiences and supporters Bačka has ardent fans. They gather in the eastern stand.
