= 2019–20 FK Partizan season =

FK Partizan
2019–20 season
- President: Milorad Vučelić
- Head coach: Savo Milošević
- Stadium: Partizan Stadium
- Serbian SuperLiga: 2nd
- Serbian Cup: Runners-up
- Europa League: Group stage
- Top goalscorer: League: Umar Sadiq (12); All: Umar Sadiq (17)
- Highest home attendance: 25,627 vs Manchester United (24 October 2019)
- Lowest home attendance: 0 vs Mačva Šabac (4 August 2019); 0 vs Mladost Lučani (30 May 2020)
- Average home league attendance: 4,866
Home colours	Away colours	Third colours
- All statistics correct as of June 24, 2020.

The 2019–20 season will be Fudbalski Klub Partizan's 73rd season in existence and the club's 14th competing in the Serbian SuperLiga.

== Transfers ==
=== In ===
Date	Position	Name	From	Type	Ref.
14 June 2019	CB	(Serbia) Dominik Dinga	(Russia) Ural Yekaterinburg	Loan	
14 June 2019	RB	(Montenegro) Periša Pešukić	(Montenegro) Budućnost Podgorica	Transfer	
14 June 2019	CB	(Montenegro) Igor Vujačić	(Montenegro) Zeta	Free transfer	
15 June 2019	MF	(Guinea) Seydouba Soumah	(Israel) Maccabi Haifa	Loan return	
15 June 2019	GK	(Serbia) Nemanja Stevanović	(Serbia) Čukarički	Loan return	
15 June 2019	FW	(Serbia) Strahinja Jovanović	(Serbia) Teleoptik	Loan return	
25 June 2019	FW	(Serbia) Aleksandar Lutovac	(Serbia) Rad	Free Transfer	
2 July 2019	FW	(Nigeria) Umar Sadiq	(Italy) Roma	Loan	
7 July 2019	LB	(Serbia) Rajko Brežančić	(Spain) Málaga	Free Transfer	
22 July 2019	FW	(Serbia) Petar Gigić	(Serbia) Mačva Šabac	Transfer	
3 August 2019	FW	(Japan) Takuma Asano	(England) Arsenal	Transfer	
20 August 2019	MF	(Israel) Bibras Natkho	(Greece) Olympiacos	Free Transfer	
4 September 2019	FW	(Serbia) Lazar Marković	(England) Fulham	Free Transfer	
18 December 2019	CB	(Serbia) Strahinja Pavlović	(France) AS Monaco	Loan	
24 January 2020	FW	(Serbia) Bojan Matić	(Serbia) Vojvodina	Transfer	
30 January 2020	FW	(Nigeria) Umar Sadiq	(Italy) Roma	Transfer	
7 February 2020	CB	(Serbia) Uroš Vitas	(Kazakhstan) Irtysh Pavlodar	Free Transfer	

=== Out ===
Date	Position	Name	To	Type	Ref.
23 May 2019	MF	(Serbia) Saša Ilić		Retired	
9 June 2019	GK	(Serbia) Marko Jovičić	(Malta) Hibernians	Loan extension	
19 June 2019	DF	(Serbia) Luka Cucin	(Serbia) Spartak Subotica	Loan extension	
21 June 2019	MF	(Serbia) Veljko Birmančević	(Serbia) Čukarički	Free Transfer	
23 June 2019	MF	(Serbia) Jovan Kokir	(Serbia) Vojvodina	Free Transfer	
28 June 2019	FW	(Serbia) Dejan Georgijević	(Hungary) Ferencváros	Loan return	
30 June 2019	MF	(Serbia) Danilo Pantić	(England) Chelsea	Loan return	
6 July 2019	DF	(Bosnia and Herzegovina) Aleksandar Subić	(Bosnia and Herzegovina) Borac Banja Luka	Free Transfer	
8 July 2019	MF	(Ukraine) Yuriy Vakulko	(Ukraine) Dnipro-1	Free Transfer	
9 July 2019	DF	(Serbia) Svetozar Marković	(Greece) Olympiacos	Transfer	
23 July 2019	DF	(Spain) Marc Valiente	(Spain) Sporting de Gijón	Free Transfer	
26 July 2019	FW	(Cape Verde) Ricardo Gomes	(United Arab Emirates) Sharjah	Transfer	
1 August 2019	MF	(Norway) Moussa Njie	(Norway) Odd	Loan	
5 August 2019	MF	(Serbia) Armin Đerlek	(Turkey) Sivasspor	Free Transfer	
7 August 2019	FW	(Serbia) Radivoj Bosić	(Switzerland) Wil	Free Transfer	
17 August 2019	FW	(Serbia) Nemanja Nikolić	(Serbia) Vojvodina	Loan	
22 August 2019	MF	(Serbia) Ivan Milosavljević	(Serbia) Teleoptik	Loan	
2 September 2019	FW	(Serbia) Ognjen Ožegović	(Germany) Darmstadt 98	Transfer	
6 September 2019	MF	(Bosnia and Herzegovina) Goran Zakarić	(Romania) Universitatea Craiova	Free Transfer	
17 September 2019	DF	(Serbia) Nemanja Miletić	(Poland) Korona Kielce	Free Transfer	
19 September 2019	DF	(Romania) Gabriel Enache	(Romania) Astra Giurgiu	Free Transfer	
18 December 2019	CB	(Serbia) Strahinja Pavlović	(France) AS Monaco	Transfer	
8 January 2020	GK	(Serbia) Filip Kljajić	(Japan) Omiya Ardija	Free Transfer	
10 January 2020	RB	(Montenegro) Periša Pešukić	(Montenegro) Budućnost Podgorica	Loan	
13 January 2020	RB	(Serbia) Luka Cucin	(Serbia) Inđija	Loan	
16 January 2020	FW	(Serbia) Petar Gigić	(Serbia) Mačva Šabac	Loan	
19 January 2020	LB	(Serbia) Zlatan Šehović	(Israel) Maccabi Netanya	Loan	
24 January 2020	MF	(Serbia) Strahinja Jovanović	(Serbia) Spartak Subotica	Free Transfer	
24 January 2020	MF	(Serbia) Ivan Milosavljević	(Serbia) Voždovac	Loan	
24 January 2020	FW	(Serbia) Nemanja Nikolić	(Serbia) Spartak Subotica	Loan	
29 January 2020	RB	(Serbia) Miroslav Vulićević		Retired	
15 February 2020	CB	(Serbia) Dominik Dinga	(Russia) Ural Yekaterinburg	Loan return	
26 February 2020	MF	(Norway) Moussa Njie	Free Agent	Released	
27 February 2020	MF	(Serbia) Zoran Tošić	(China) Taizhou Yuanda	Free Transfer	

== Players ==
=== Squad ===
No.	Name	Nationality	Position (s)	Date of birth (age)	Signed from	Notes
Goalkeepers
41	Aleksandar Popović	(Serbia)	GK	29 September 1999 (age 26)	Youth system	
85	Nemanja Stevanović	(Serbia)	GK	8 May 1992 (age 34)	(Serbia) Čukarički	
88	Vladimir Stojković	(Serbia)	GK	28 July 1983 (age 43)	(England) Nottingham Forest	Captain
Defenders
3	Strahinja Pavlović	(Serbia)	CB	24 May 2001 (age 25)	(France) AS Monaco	Loan
5	Igor Vujačić	(Montenegro)	CB	8 August 1994 (age 32)	(Montenegro) Zeta	
15	Uroš Vitas	(Serbia)	CB	6 July 1992 (age 34)	(Kazakhstan) Irtysh Pavlodar	
23	Bojan Ostojić	(Serbia)	CB	12 February 1984 (age 42)	(Serbia) Čukarički	Vice-captain
31	Rajko Brežančić	(Serbia)	LB	21 August 1989 (age 37)	(Spain) Málaga	
72	Slobodan Urošević	(Serbia)	LB	15 April 1994 (age 32)	(Serbia) Napredak Kruševac	
73	Nemanja Miletić	(Serbia)	CB / RB	16 January 1991 (age 35)	(Belgium) Westerlo	Vice-captain
Midfielders
6	Bibras Natkho	(Israel)	CM	18 February 1988 (age 38)	(Greece) Olympiacos	
10	Lazar Pavlović	(Serbia)	AM	2 November 2001 (age 24)	Youth system	
16	Saša Zdjelar	(Serbia)	DM	20 March 1995 (age 31)	(Greece) Olympiacos	
19	Aleksandar Šćekić	(Montenegro)	DM	12 December 1991 (age 34)	(Turkey) Gençlerbirliği	
20	Seydouba Soumah	(Guinea)	AM	11 June 1991 (age 35)	(Slovakia) Slovan Bratislava	
40	Luka Đorđević	(Serbia)	DM	5 May 2001 (age 25)	Youth system	
99	Milan Smiljanić	(Serbia)	DM	19 November 1986 (age 39)	(Israel) Hapoel Ashkelon	Vice-captain
Forwards
9	Umar Sadiq	(Nigeria)	CF	2 February 1997 (age 29)	(Italy) Roma	
11	Takuma Asano	(Japan)	FW	10 November 1994 (age 31)	(England) Arsenal	
18	Đorđe Ivanović	(Serbia)	FW / LW	20 November 1995 (age 30)	(Serbia) Spartak Subotica	
27	Nikola Lakčević	(Serbia)	FW / RW	28 October 1999 (age 26)	(Serbia) OFK Beograd	
32	Nikola Štulić	(Serbia)	CF	8 September 2001 (age 25)	Youth system	
33	Slobodan Stanojlović	(Serbia)	FW / LW	28 December 2001 (age 24)	Youth system	
50	Lazar Marković	(Serbia)	RW	2 March 1994 (age 32)	(England) Fulham	
80	Filip Stevanović	(Serbia)	LW	25 September 2002 (age 23)	Youth system	
91	Bojan Matić	(Serbia)	CF	22 December 1991 (age 34)	(Serbia) Vojvodina	
97	Aleksandar Lutovac	(Serbia)	RW / RB	28 June 1997 (age 29)	(Serbia) Rad	

== Friendlies ==
25 June 2019 Friendly	Partizan (Serbia)	0–1	(Montenegro) Budućnost Podgorica	Užice, Serbia
18:00		Report	Perović 12'	Stadium: Užice City Stadium; Referee: (Serbia) Petar Piper

30 June 2019 Friendly	Zvijezda 09 (Bosnia and Herzegovina)	0–2	(Serbia) Partizan	Ugljevik, Bosnia and Herzegovina
18:00		Report; Report	Lutovac 51'; Stevanović 58'	Stadium: Ugljevik City Stadium; Attendance: 2,000; Referee: (Bosnia and Herzegovina) Dražen Marić

3 July 2019 Friendly	Beltinci (Slovenia)	0–6	(Serbia) Partizan	Pohorje, Slovenia
18:00		Report	Ivanović 20'; Dinga 27'; Lakčević 60'; Ožegović 66', 90' (pen.); Marković 83'	Stadium: Pohorje Stadium; Referee: (Slovenia) Nejc Gregič

6 July 2019 Friendly	Olimpija Ljubljana (Slovenia)	1–0	(Serbia) Partizan	Ljubljana, Slovenia
20:15	Çekiçi 77' (pen.)	Report		Stadium: Stožice Stadium; Attendance: 3,500; Referee: (Slovenia) Rade Obrenović

10 July 2019 Friendly	Girondins de Bordeaux (France)	1–2	(Serbia) Partizan	Völkermarkt, Austria
18:00	Briand 83'	Report	Sadiq 41'; Smiljanić 77'	Stadium: Lilienberg Arena; Attendance: 200; Referee: (Austria) Christian-Petru Ciochirca

13 July 2019 Friendly	Paks (Hungary)	2–2	(Serbia) Partizan	Pohorje, Slovenia
17:00	Papp 27'; Bode 44'	Report	Soumah 51'; Ostojić 85'	Stadium: Pohorje Stadium; Attendance: 150; Referee: (Slovenia) Nejc Gregič

6 November 2019 Friendly	Rakovica (Serbia)	0–8	(Serbia) Partizan	Belgrade, Serbia
		Report		Stadium: FK Rakovica Stadium

22 January 2020 Friendly	Viitorul Constanța (Romania)	0–1	(Serbia) Partizan	Antalya, Turkey
09:00		Report	Jović 68'	Stadium: Sueno Golf stadium Attendance: 50

22 January 2020 Friendly	Cracovia (Poland)	1–1	(Serbia) Partizan	Antalya, Turkey
14:00	Vestenický 86' (pen.)	Report	Tošić 61'	Stadium: Sueno Golf stadium Attendance: 50

26 January 2020 Friendly	Ružomberok (Slovakia)	1–2	(Serbia) Partizan	Antalya, Turkey
15:00	Gerec 50'	Report	Soumah 19'; Čurma 25' (o.g.)	Stadium: Sueno Golf stadium Attendance: 50

1 February 2020 Match Premier Cup	Lokomotiv Moscow (Russia)	1–1 (2–4 p)	(Serbia) Partizan	Doha, Qatar
12:00	Eder 30'	Report	Tošić 34'	Stadium: Aspire Academy stadium Attendance: 200; Referee: (Qatar) Mohamed Khamis Al-Kuwari
	Penalties
	João Mário (penalty scored); Tugarev (penalty missed); Rybus (penalty missed); Eder (penalty scored)		Marković (penalty scored); Zdjelar (penalty scored); Matić (penalty scored); Stevanović (penalty scored)

4 February 2020 Match Premier Cup	Partizan (Serbia)	1–3	(Russia) Rostov	Doha, Qatar
16:00	Sadiq 87' (pen.)	Report	Mamayev 32'; Dolgov 57'; Shomurodov 73'	Stadium: Aspire Academy stadium Attendance: 250

8 February 2020 Match Premier Cup	Spartak Moscow (Russia)	3–2	(Serbia) Partizan	Doha, Qatar
12:00	Zobnin 7'; Sobolev 48'; Ponce 70' (pen.)	Report	Pavlović 17'; Soumah 34'	Stadium: Aspire Academy stadium Attendance: 300

22 May 2020 Friendly	Partizan (Serbia)	2–1	(Serbia) Zemun	Belgrade, Serbia
11:00	Sadiq 19'; Pavlović 22'	Report	Kuzmanović 75'	Stadium: Partizan Stadium

== Competitions ==
=== Overview ===
Competition	Record							
Competition	P	W	D	L	GF	GA	GD	Win %
Serbian SuperLiga	30	20	4	6	69	25	+44	66.67
Serbian Cup	5	4	1	0	15	3	+12	80.00
UEFA Europa League	12	6	3	3	20	14	+6	50.00
Total	47	30	8	9	104	42	+62	63.83

=== Serbian SuperLiga ===
==== Regular season ====
===== League table =====
Pos	Team	Pld	W	D	L	GF	GA	GD	Pts	Qualification
1	Red Star Belgrade (C)	30	25	3	2	68	18	+50	78	Qualification for the Champions League first qualifying round
2	Partizan	30	20	4	6	69	25	+44	64	Qualification for the Europa League first qualifying round
3	Vojvodina	30	19	5	6	47	27	+20	62	Qualification for the Europa League third qualifying round (Note: Vojvodina qualified for the Europa League third qualifying round by winning the 2019–20 Serbian Cup. As a result, the spot awarded to the third-placed team (Europa League first qualifying round) was passed to the fourth-placed team.)
4	TSC	30	17	8	5	59	34	+25	59	Qualification for the Europa League first qualifying round
5	Radnički Niš	30	16	4	10	51	37	+14	52	

Source: SuperLiga (in Serbian), Soccerway
Rules for classification: 1) Points; 2) Head-to-head points; 3) Head-to-head goal difference; 4) Head-to-head goals scored; 5) Head-to-head away goals scored (if two teams tied); 6) Goal difference; 7) Goals scored; 8) Fair play ranking; 9) Draw.
(C) Champions

===== Results by matchday =====
Round	1	2	3	4	5	6	7	8	9	10	11	12	13	14	15	16	17	18	19	20	21	22	23	24	25	26	27	28	29	30
Ground	A	A	H	A	H	A	H	A	H	A	H	A	H	A	H	H	H	A	H	A	H	A	H	A	H	A	H	A	H	A
Result	W	W	W	D	W	W	D	W	W	W	L	L	W	L	W	W	W	W	L	W	W	D	W	D	W	W	W	L	W	L
Position	7	6	3	5	4	5	6	5	5	3	5	5	4	4	4	4	4	3	4	3	2	2	2	2	2	2	2	2	2	2

Updated to match(es) played on 19 June 2020. Source: Partizan
A = Away; H = Home; W = Win; D = Draw; L = Loss

=== Results ===
21 July 2019 1	Inđija	0–1	Partizan	Inđija
18:00	Janjić (yellow card) 73'	Report	Tošić 27'; Ivanović (yellow card) 45+1' (yellow-red card) 78'	Stadium: Inđija Stadium; Attendance: 4,000; Referee: (Serbia) Srđan Jovanović

25 September 2019* 2	Javor Ivanjica	0–2	Partizan	Ivanjica
17:00	Jevremović (yellow card) 20'; Piščević (yellow card) 68'; Pavišić (yellow card) 70'	Report	Sadiq (yellow card) 18'; Marković 26', 75'	Stadium: Ivanjica Stadium; Attendance: 2,000; Referee: (Serbia) Lazar Lukić

4 August 2019 3	Partizan	4–0	Mačva Šabac	Belgrade
20:00	Stevanović 19'; Ožegović 42'; Soumah 49'; Sadiq 90+1'	Report	Adamović (yellow card) 45'; Milosavljević (yellow card) 65'	Stadium: Partizan Stadium; Attendance: 0 Referee: (Serbia) Bojan Nikolić

10 August 2019 4	Napredak Kruševac	2–2	Partizan	Kruševac
19:00	Ivanović 11', 29'; Pavićević (yellow card) 55'; Pajović (yellow card) 68'; Eskić (yellow card) 72'; Milošević (yellow card) 90+1'	Report	Brežančić 14'; Smiljanić (yellow card) 63'; Soumah 66'; Miletić (yellow card) 69'; Pavlović (yellow card) 85'	Stadium: Mladost Stadium; Attendance: 6,000; Referee: (Serbia) Zoran Široki

18 August 2019 5	Partizan	3–0	Rad	Belgrade
19:00	Ožegović 26'; Vujačić (yellow card) 60'; Stevanović 65', 89'; Sadiq (yellow card) 87'	Report	Smiljanić (yellow card) 35'; Stjepanović (yellow card) 45'; Marković (yellow card) 46'; Nikolić (yellow card) 68'	Stadium: Partizan Stadium; Attendance: 6,000; Referee: (Serbia) Miloš Đorđić

15 December 2019* 6	Radnik Surdulica	1–2	Partizan	Surdulica
13:00	Stevanović (yellow card) 69'; Mićić (yellow card) 77' (goal) 90'; Mitošević (yellow card) 89'	Report	Soumah 30'; Asano 52'; Smiljanić (yellow card) 90+3'	Stadium: Surdulica City Stadium; Attendance: 2,000; Referee: (Serbia) Srđan Jovanović

1 September 2019 7	Partizan	1–1	TSC	Belgrade
20:00	Sadiq (yellow card) 34' (goal) 44'; Ožegović (yellow card) 86'; Pavlović (yellow card) 90+2'	Report	Lukić 1'; Filipović (yellow card) 75'; Tumbasević (yellow card) 90+5'	Stadium: Partizan Stadium; Attendance: 15,000; Referee: (Serbia) Novak Simović

14 September 2019 8	Proleter Novi Sad	0–3	Partizan	Novi Sad
20:30	Tanasin (yellow card) 47'; Pejić (yellow card) 50'	Report	Tošić 56'; Sadiq 73'; Marković 78'; Natkho (yellow card) 83'	Stadium: Karađorđe Stadium; Attendance: 3,000; Referee: (Serbia) Bojan Nikolić

22 September 2019 9	Partizan	2–0	Red Star Belgrade	Belgrade
18:00	Šćekić (yellow card) 19'; Soumah 83' (yellow card) 84'; Urošević (yellow card) 87'; Tošić 90+3'	Report	Vulić (yellow card) 19' (yellow-red card) 90+2' van La Parra (yellow card) 56'; Boakye (yellow card) 61'; Borjan (yellow card) 85'	Stadium: Partizan Stadium; Attendance: 24,000; Referee: (Serbia) Srđan Jovanović

28 September 2019 10	Radnički Niš	1–4	Partizan	Niš
15:00	Haskić 11' (pen.); Bondarenko (yellow card) 22'; Sulaka (yellow card) 24'; Stevanović (yellow card) 78'	Report	Natkho 23' (pen.) (yellow card) 39'; Sadiq 30', 78' (yellow card) 84'; Soumah 56'; Tošić (yellow card) 57'; Urošević (yellow card) 65'	Stadium: Čair Stadium; Attendance: 4,500; Referee: (Serbia) Zoran Široki

6 October 2019 11	Partizan	1–2	Voždovac	Belgrade
18:00	Stojković (yellow card) 27'; Šehović (yellow card) 61'; Pavlović 90+1'; Soumah (yellow card) 90+3'	Report	Nikolić 28' (pen.); Purtić (yellow card) 45+3'; Zličić (yellow card) 74'; Mikić (yellow card) 76'; Dević 90+6'	Stadium: Partizan Stadium; Attendance: 6,000; Referee: (Serbia) Momčilo Marković

19 October 2019 12	Mladost Lučani	1–0	Partizan	Lučani
15:00	Leković (yellow card) 6'; Jovanović (yellow card) 15' (goal) 77'; Eliomar (yellow card) 84'	Report		Stadium: Mladost Stadium; Attendance: 3,000; Referee: (Serbia) Novak Simović

27 October 2019 13	Partizan	4–0	Spartak Subotica	Belgrade
16:00	Natkho 17'; Sadiq 39'; Soumah 41'; Ivanović 77' (pen.)	Report	Milošević (yellow card) 11'; Tekijaški (yellow card) 69'; Dokić (yellow card) 77'	Stadium: Partizan Stadium; Attendance: 3,000; Referee: (Serbia) Danilo Grujić

30 October 2019 14	Čukarički	2–1	Partizan	Belgrade
15:30	Puškarić (yellow card) 12'; Šapić 16'; Docić (yellow card) 27'; Stojanović 90'	Report	Ivanović 70'	Stadium: Čukarički Stadium; Attendance: 1,500; Referee: (Serbia) Nenad Minaković

2 November 2019 15	Partizan	4–0	Vojvodina	Belgrade
14:00	Šćekić (yellow card) 23'; Stojković (yellow card) 25'; Natkho 29' (pen.), 43'; Zdjelar 48'; Sadiq (yellow card) 60' (goal) 69'; Ivanović (yellow card) 79'	Report	Đurišić (yellow card) 18'; Devetak (yellow card) 29'	Stadium: Partizan Stadium; Attendance: 2,500; Referee: (Serbia) Miloš Đorđić

10 November 2019 16	Partizan	3–0	Inđija	Belgrade
16:30	Tošić 17'; Šćekić 51'; Asano 53' (pen.)	Report	Jovanović (yellow card) 19'	Stadium: Partizan Stadium; Attendance: 2,500; Referee: (Serbia) Milan Ilić

22 November 2019 17	Partizan	6–2	Javor Ivanjica	Belgrade
18:00	Sadiq 9', 37', 59'; Ostojić 15'; Miletić 40'; Stevanović 78'	Report	Petković 2'; Krnić 45+2'; Kuveljić (yellow card) 58'	Stadium: Partizan Stadium; Attendance: 2,000; Referee: (Serbia) Zoran Široki

1 December 2019 18	Mačva Šabac	0–2	Partizan	Šabac
15:00	Ivić (yellow card) 38'	Report	Asano 16'; Urošević 70'	Stadium: Šabac City Stadium; Attendance: 5,000; Referee: (Serbia) Danilo Grujić

4 December 2019 19	Partizan	2–3	Napredak Kruševac	Belgrade
17:00	Soumah 13', 34'; Urošević (yellow card) 37'; Zdjelar (yellow card) 87'	Report	Baha (yellow card) 22'; Aksentijević (yellow card) 37'; Vukadinović 43'; Bjeloš 83' (yellow card) 90+2'; Gavrić (yellow card) 87'; Obradović (yellow card) 88'; Eskić 90+5'	Stadium: Partizan Stadium; Attendance: 1,500; Referee: (Serbia) Novica Anđelovski

8 December 2019 20	Rad	1–2	Partizan	Belgrade
13:30	Riznić 35'; Kovačević (yellow card) 78'; Busnić (yellow card) 86'	Report	Soumah (yellow card) 30' (goal) 53'; Sadiq 33' (yellow card) 65'	Stadium: Rad Stadium; Attendance: 1,500; Referee: (Serbia) Miloš Milanović

16 February 2020 21	Partizan	3–0	Radnik Surdulica	Belgrade
16:00	Tošić 38'; Natkho 67' (pen.), 80'; Sadiq (yellow card) 73'	Report		Stadium: Partizan Stadium; Attendance: 3,500; Referee: (Serbia) Bojan Nikolić

22 February 2020 22	TSC	1–1	Partizan	Senta
16:00	Silađi (yellow card) 35' (goal) 69'; Arsenijević (yellow card) 63'; Milićević (yellow card) 77'; Lukić (yellow card) 85'	Report	Ostojić (yellow card) 19'; Zdjelar (yellow card) 53'; Pavlović (yellow card) 81'; Natkho 90+1' (pen.); Matić (yellow card) 90+5'	Stadium: Senta City Stadium; Attendance: 4,000; Referee: (Serbia) Lazar Lukić

26 February 2020 23	Partizan	3–1	Proleter Novi Sad	Belgrade
18:00	Marković 7'; Matić 23'; Miletić 88'	Report	Rušević (yellow card) 13'; Andrejević (yellow card) 45'; Radinović (yellow card) 76'; Mitrović (yellow card) 86'; Balabanović 90+1'	Stadium: Partizan Stadium; Attendance: 2,000; Referee: (Serbia) Milan Ilić

1 March 2020 24	Red Star Belgrade	0–0	Partizan	Belgrade
18:00	Jovančić (yellow card) 13'; Rodić (yellow card) 72'	Report	Soumah (yellow card) 23'; Miletić (yellow card) 36'; Stevanović (yellow card) 61'; Šćekić (yellow card) 82'; Pavlović (yellow card) 90'; Ostojić (yellow card) 90+4'; Stojković (yellow card) 90+5'	Stadium: Red Star Stadium; Attendance: 38,271; Referee: (Serbia) Lazar Lukić

7 March 2020 25	Partizan	1–0	Radnički Niš	Belgrade
20:00	Ivanović 84' (pen.)	Report	Todorovski (yellow card) 12'	Stadium: Partizan Stadium; Attendance: 2,000; Referee: (Serbia) Novak Simović

14 March 2020 26	Voždovac	1–2	Partizan	Belgrade
15:30	Cvetković (yellow card) 35'; Mikić (yellow card) 38'; Lasickas (yellow card) 51'; Stojčev (yellow card) 54' (goal) 68'	Report	Marković (yellow card) 49'; Šćekić 62'; Matić 65'	Stadium: Voždovac Stadium; Attendance: 0 Referee: (Serbia) Milan Ilić

30 May 2020 27	Partizan	4–1	Mladost Lučani	Belgrade
17:30	Marković 12'; Asano 19'; Sadiq 62' (pen.); Stevanović 70' (yellow card) 85'	Report	Odita 23'; Stojanović (yellow card) 33'; Radović (yellow card) 72'	Stadium: Partizan Stadium; Attendance: 0 Referee: (Serbia) Novica Anđelovski

6 June 2020 28	Spartak Subotica	3–2	Partizan	Subotica
16:30	Nikolić 29', 59'; Vidaković (yellow card) 44'; Denković 69' (yellow card) 70'; Ivančević (yellow card) 90+1'	Report	Stevanović 12', 44'; Pavlović (yellow card) 79'	Stadium: Subotica City Stadium; Attendance: 1,300; Referee: (Serbia) Zoran Široki

14 June 2020 29	Partizan	4–1	Čukarički	Belgrade
19:00	Matić 17'; Asano (yellow card) 34'; Natkho 39'; Vitas 45'; Soumah 54'; Ostojić (yellow card) 61'	Report	Stevanović (yellow card) 36'; Tedić 57'	Stadium: Partizan Stadium; Attendance: 3,000; Referee: (Serbia) Miloš Milanović

19 June 2020 30	Vojvodina	1–0	Partizan	Novi Sad
19:00	Čović (yellow card) 12' (goal) 14' (pen.); Saničanin (yellow card) 20'; Mrkaić (yellow card) 44'; Stojković (yellow card) 67'	Report	Matić (yellow card) 3'; Zdjelar (yellow card) 14'; Vujačić (yellow card) 68'; Brežančić (yellow card) 80'; Štulić (yellow card) 84'	Stadium: Karađorđe Stadium; Attendance: 5,500; Referee: (Serbia) Miloš Đorđić

Season was suspended on 15 March 2020, as a result of COVID-19 pandemic and declaring state of emergency, and was resumed on 29 May 2020. The season was shortened and the play-offs (championship round and relegation round) were cancelled, and no teams would be relegated.

=== Serbian Cup ===
9 October 2019 First round	Vodojaža	0–6	Partizan	Grošnica
15:00		Report; Report	Ivanović 41', 46', 60', 65', 90'; Vujačić (yellow card) 44'; Lutovac 64'	Stadium: Stadion Jankovske Klisure; Attendance: 3,000; Referee: (Serbia) Milan Ilić

10 March 2020 Second round	Partizan	4–0	Spartak Subotica	Belgrade
18:00	Pavlović 24', 56'; Milanović 47' (o.g.); Matić 61'	Report		Stadium: Partizan Stadium; Attendance: 1,500; Referee: (Serbia) Petar Piper

3 June 2020 Quarterfinals	Radnik Surdulica	1–2	Partizan	Surdulica
17:30	Stamenković 45+16'	Report	Pavlović (yellow card) 32'; Asano 45+2', 45+15'; Miletić (yellow card) 72'	Stadium: Surdulica City Stadium; Attendance: 1,000; Referee: (Serbia) Srđan Jovanović

10 June 2020 Semifinal	Partizan	1–0	Red Star Belgrade	Belgrade
20:00	Šćekić (yellow card) 31'; Zdjelar (yellow card) 39'; Stojković (yellow card) 44'; Natkho 58'; Asano (yellow card) 67'; Soumah (yellow card) 85'	Report	Rodić (yellow card) 9'; Degenek (yellow card) 28'; Gobeljić (yellow card) 38'; Ben (yellow card) 88'	Stadium: Partizan Stadium; Attendance: 15,803; Referee: (Serbia) Novak Simović

24 June 2020 Final	Vojvodina	2–2 (4–2 p)	Partizan	Niš
19:00	Vukadinović 38'; Bojić 55' (yellow card) 76'; Saničanin (yellow card) 67'; Andrić (yellow card) 88'; Drinčić (yellow card) 90+2'; Devetak (yellow card) 120'; Simić (red card) 120'	Report	Stevanović 81' (yellow card) 102'; Vitas (yellow card) 87'; Pavlović 90+6' (yellow card) 118'; Stevanović (red card) 120'	Stadium: Čair Stadium; Attendance: 8,600; Referee: (Serbia) Danilo Grujić
	Penalties
	Stojković (penalty scored); Gemović (penalty scored); Devetak (penalty scored); Đorđević (penalty scored)		Natkho (penalty scored); Vitas (penalty missed); Stevanović (penalty scored); Zdjelar (penalty missed)

=== UEFA Europa League ===
==== Second qualifying round ====
25 July 2019 Second qualifying round	Connah's Quay Nomads (Wales)	0–1	(Serbia) Partizan	Rhyl, Wales
19:30	Woolfe (yellow card) 13'; Insall (yellow card) 45+1'; Horan (yellow card) 45+4'	Report; Report	Tošić (yellow card) 45+1'; Stojković (yellow card) 45+4'; Šćekić 62'	Stadium: Belle Vue; Attendance: 829; Referee: (Slovakia) Michal Ocenáš

1 August 2019 Second qualifying round	Partizan (Serbia)	3–0 (4–0 agg.)	(Wales) Connah's Quay Nomads	Belgrade, Serbia
21:00	Tošić 54'; Ožegović 70'; Stevanović 73'	Report; Report	Insall (yellow card) 37'; Wilde (yellow card) 56'	Stadium: Partizan Stadium; Attendance: 8,200; Referee: (Portugal) Luis Godinho

==== Third qualifying round ====
8 August 2019 Third qualifying round	Partizan (Serbia)	3–1	(Turkey) Yeni Malatyaspor	Belgrade, Serbia
21:00	Sadiq 4'; Zdjelar (yellow card) 26'; Ostojić (yellow card) 37'; Stevanović (yellow card) 40'; Asano 67'; Soumah 89' (pen.)	Report; Report	Chaalali (yellow card) 38'; Akbaş (yellow card) 77'; Guilherme (yellow card) 79'; Kaş (yellow card) 81'; Chebake 84'	Stadium: Partizan Stadium; Attendance: 13,442; Referee: (Russia) Sergey Ivanov

15 August 2019 Third qualifying round	Yeni Malatyaspor (Turkey)	1–0 (2–3 agg.)	(Serbia) Partizan	Malatya, Turkey
19:00	Jahović 7' (yellow card) 90+3'; Akbaş (yellow card) 45+2'; Chaalali (yellow card) 45+4'; Çağıran (yellow card) 64'	Report; Report	Šćekić (yellow card) 46'; Sadiq (yellow card) 53'; Ostojić (yellow card) 77'	Stadium: Malatya Arena; Attendance: 14,665; Referee: (England) Chris Kavanagh

==== Play-off round ====
22 August 2019 Play-off round	Partizan (Serbia)	2–1	(Norway) Molde	Belgrade, Serbia
21:00	Soumah 45+1'; Zdjelar (yellow card) 72'; Tošić 84'	Report; Report	Bolly 44' (yellow card) 72'; James (yellow card) 50'	Stadium: Partizan Stadium; Attendance: 3,157; Referee: (Hungary) Viktor Kassai

29 August 2019 Play-off round	Molde (Norway)	1–1 (2–3 agg.)	(Serbia) Partizan	Molde, Norway
19:00	Forren (yellow card) 32'; Aursnes (yellow card) 41'; James 72'; Hussain (yellow card) 76'	Report; Report	Zdjelar (yellow card) 2'; Soumah (yellow card) 66'; Miletić 80' (yellow card) 82'; Stojković (yellow card) 90+1'	Stadium: Aker Stadion; Attendance: 7,102; Referee: (France) Ruddy Buquet

==== Group stage ====
Pos	Team	Pld	W	D	L	GF	GA	GD	Pts	Qualification
1	(England) Manchester United	6	4	1	1	10	2	+8	13	Advance to knockout phase
2	(Netherlands) AZ	6	2	3	1	15	8	+7	9	Advance to knockout phase
3	(Serbia) Partizan	6	2	2	2	10	10	0	8	
4	(Kazakhstan) Astana	6	1	0	5	4	19	−15	3	

Source: UEFA
Rules for classification: Group stage tiebreakers

==== Results ====
19 September 2019 1	Partizan (Serbia)	2–2	(Netherlands) AZ	Belgrade, Serbia
21:00 CET	Zdjelar (yellow card) 26'; Natkho 42' (pen.), 61'	Report; Report	Stengs 13'; Svensson (red card) 27'; Midtsjø (yellow card) 43'; Boadu 67'	Stadium: Partizan Stadium; Attendance: 22,564; Referee: Marco Guida (Italy)

3 October 2019 2	Astana (Kazakhstan)	1–2	(Serbia) Partizan	Nur-Sultan, Kazakhstan
16:50 CET	Sigurjónsson 85'	Report; Report	Sadiq 29', 73'	Stadium: Astana Arena; Attendance: 20,137; Referee: Mohammed Al-Hakim (Sweden)

24 October 2019 3	Partizan (Serbia)	0–1	(England) Manchester United	Belgrade, Serbia
18:55 CET	Natkho (yellow card) 66'; Miletić (yellow card) 67'; Zdjelar (yellow card) 89'	Report; Report	Martial 43' (pen.); Jones (yellow card) 46'	Stadium: Partizan Stadium; Attendance: 25,627; Referee: Xavier Estrada Fernández (Spain)

7 November 2019 4	Manchester United (England)	3–0	(Serbia) Partizan	Manchester, England
21:00 CET	Greenwood 22'; Martial 33'; Rashford 49'; Young (yellow card) 71'	Report; Report	Natkho (yellow card) 32'; Pavlović (yellow card) 58'	Stadium: Old Trafford; Attendance: 62,955; Referee: Mattias Gestranius (Finland)

28 November 2019 5	AZ (Netherlands)	2–2	(Serbia) Partizan	The Hague, Netherlands
18:55 CET	Stengs (yellow card) 38'; Koopmeiners (yellow card) 54'; Boadu (yellow card) 54' (yellow-red card) 84'; Midtsjø (yellow card) 85'; Druijf 85', 90+2'; Bizot (yellow card) 90+8'	Report; Report	Asano 16'; Soumah 27'; Stojković (yellow card) 77'; Natkho (yellow card) 90'; Brežančić (yellow card) 90+7'	Stadium: Cars Jeans Stadion; Attendance: 9,092; Referee: Daniel Stefański (Poland)

12 December 2019 6	Partizan (Serbia)	4–1	(Kazakhstan) Astana	Belgrade, Serbia
21:00 CET	Soumah 4'; Sadiq 22', 76'; Asano 26'	Report; Report	Rotariu 79'	Stadium: Partizan Stadium; Attendance: 8,075; Referee: Filip Glova (Slovakia)

== Statistics ==
=== Squad statistics ===
No.	Pos	Nat	Player	Total		SuperLiga		Cup		Europe League	
No.	Pos	Nat	Player	Apps	Goals	Apps	Goals	Apps	Goals	Apps	Goals
Goalkeepers
41	GK	(Serbia) SRB	Aleksandar Popović	1	0	1	0	0	0	0	0
85	GK	(Serbia) SRB	Nemanja Stevanović	5	0	2	0	3	0	0	0
88	GK	(Serbia) SRB	Vladimir Stojković	40	0	25	0	3	0	12	0
Defenders
3	DF	(Serbia) SRB	Strahinja Pavlović	42	2	26	1	4	1	12	0
5	DF	(Montenegro) MNE	Igor Vujačić	12	0	8	0	1	0	3	0
15	DF	(Serbia) SRB	Uroš Vitas	8	1	5	1	3	0	0	0
23	DF	(Serbia) SRB	Bojan Ostojić	37	1	24	1	2	0	11	0
31	DF	(Serbia) SRB	Rajko Brežančić	16	1	12	1	1	0	3	0
72	DF	(Serbia) SRB	Slobodan Urošević	38	1	22	1	4	0	12	0
73	DF	(Serbia) SRB	Nemanja Miletić	38	3	23	2	4	0	11	1
Midfielders
6	MF	(Israel) ISR	Bibras Natkho	32	11	22	8	3	1	7	2
10	MF	(Serbia) SRB	Lazar Pavlović	22	2	16	0	3	2	3	0
16	MF	(Serbia) SRB	Saša Zdjelar	44	1	28	1	4	0	12	0
19	MF	(Montenegro) MNE	Aleksandar Šćekić	38	3	23	2	4	0	11	1
20	MF	(Guinea) GUI	Seydouba Soumah	39	14	25	10	2	0	12	4
40	MF	(Serbia) SRB	Luka Đorđević	1	0	0	0	1	0	0	0
80	MF	(Serbia) SRB	Filip Stevanović	35	9	25	7	3	1	7	1
99	MF	(Serbia) SRB	Milan Smiljanić	8	0	7	0	1	0	0	0
Forwards
9	FW	(Nigeria) NGA	Umar Sadiq	39	17	24	12	3	0	12	5
11	FW	(Japan) JPN	Takuma Asano	37	9	23	4	4	2	10	3
18	FW	(Serbia) SRB	Đorđe Ivanović	21	8	15	3	2	5	4	0
27	FW	(Serbia) SRB	Nikola Lakčević	12	0	9	0	2	0	1	0
32	FW	(Serbia) SRB	Nikola Štulić	2	0	2	0	0	0	0	0
33	FW	(Serbia) SRB	Slobodan Stanojlović	2	0	1	0	1	0	0	0
50	FW	(Serbia) SRB	Lazar Marković	17	5	10	5	5	0	2	0
91	FW	(Serbia) SRB	Bojan Matić	13	4	10	3	3	1	0	0
97	FW	(Serbia) SRB	Aleksandar Lutovac	12	1	8	0	1	1	3	0
Players transferred out during the season
2	DF	(Montenegro) MNE	Periša Pešukić	2	0	1	0	1	0	0	0
7	MF	(Serbia) SRB	Zoran Tošić	29	7	17	5	0	0	12	2
12	GK	(Serbia) SRB	Filip Kljajić	3	0	2	0	0	0	1	0
17	DF	(Serbia) SRB	Zlatan Šehović	1	0	1	0	0	0	0	0
45	FW	(Serbia) SRB	Petar Gigić	3	0	1	0	1	0	1	0
51	FW	(Serbia) SRB	Ognjen Ožegović	11	3	5	2	0	0	6	1
67	DF	(Serbia) SRB	Dominik Dinga	2	0	1	0	1	0	0	0
90	MF	(Serbia) SRB	Strahinja Jovanović	2	0	1	0	1	0	0	0

Last updated: 24 June 2020
Source: Competitions

=== Goal scorers ===
Rank	No.	Pos	Nat	Name	SuperLiga	Serbian Cup	Europe	Total
1	9	FW	(Nigeria)	Umar Sadiq	12	0	5	17
2	20	MF	(Guinea)	Seydouba Soumah	10	0	4	14
3	6	MF	(Israel)	Bibras Natkho	8	1	2	11
4	11	FW	(Japan)	Takuma Asano	4	2	3	9
4	80	MF	(Serbia)	Filip Stevanović	7	1	1	9
5	18	MF	(Serbia)	Đorđe Ivanović	3	5	0	8
6	7	MF	(Serbia)	Zoran Tošić	5	0	2	7
7	50	FW	(Serbia)	Lazar Marković	5	0	0	5
8	91	FW	(Serbia)	Bojan Matić	3	1	0	4
9	51	FW	(Serbia)	Ognjen Ožegović	2	0	1	3
9	73	DF	(Serbia)	Nemanja Miletić	2	0	1	3
9	19	MF	(Montenegro)	Aleksandar Šćekić	2	0	1	3
10	10	MF	(Serbia)	Lazar Pavlović	0	2	0	2
10	3	DF	(Serbia)	Strahinja Pavlović	1	1	0	2
11	31	DF	(Serbia)	Rajko Brežančić	1	0	0	1
11	97	FW	(Serbia)	Aleksandar Lutovac	0	1	0	1
11	16	MF	(Serbia)	Saša Zdjelar	1	0	0	1
11	23	DF	(Serbia)	Bojan Ostojić	1	0	0	1
11	72	DF	(Serbia)	Slobodan Urošević	1	0	0	1
11	15	DF	(Serbia)	Uroš Vitas	1	0	0	1
11	—	—		Own goal	0	1	0	1
Totals					69	15	20	104

Last updated: 24 June 2020

=== Clean sheets ===
Rank	No.	Pos	Nat	Name	SuperLiga	Serbian Cup	Europe	Total
1	88	GK	(Serbia)	Vladimir Stojković	12	0	2	14
2	85	GK	(Serbia)	Nemanja Stevanović	0	3	0	3
3	12	GK	(Serbia)	Filip Kljajić	1	0	0	1
Totals					13	3	2	18

Last updated: 10 June 2020

=== Disciplinary record ===
Number	Nation	Position	Name	SuperLiga		Serbian Cup		Europe		Total	
Number	Nation	Position	Name	Booked	Sent off (straight red)	Booked	Sent off (straight red)	Booked	Sent off (straight red)	Booked	Sent off (straight red)
3	(Serbia)	DF	Strahinja Pavlović	4	0	2	0	1	0	7	0
5	(Montenegro)	DF	Igor Vujačić	2	0	1	0	0	0	3	0
6	(Israel)	MF	Bibras Natkho	2	0	0	0	3	0	5	0
7	(Serbia)	MF	Zoran Tošić	1	0	0	0	1	0	2	0
9	(Nigeria)	FW	Umar Sadiq	7	0	0	0	1	0	8	0
10	(Serbia)	MF	Lazar Pavlović	1	0	0	0	0	0	1	0
11	(Japan)	FW	Takuma Asano	1	0	1	0	0	0	2	0
15	(Serbia)	DF	Uroš Vitas	0	0	1	0	0	0	1	0
16	(Serbia)	MF	Saša Zdjelar	3	0	1	0	5	0	9	0
17	(Serbia)	DF	Zlatan Šehović	1	0	0	0	0	0	1	0
18	(Serbia)	MF	Đorđe Ivanović	3	1	0	0	0	0	3	1
19	(Montenegro)	MF	Aleksandar Šćekić	3	0	1	0	1	0	5	0
20	(Guinea)	MF	Seydouba Soumah	4	0	1	0	1	0	6	0
23	(Serbia)	DF	Bojan Ostojić	3	0	0	0	2	0	5	0
31	(Serbia)	DF	Rajko Brežančić	1	0	0	0	1	0	2	0
32	(Serbia)	FW	Nikola Štulić	1	0	0	0	0	0	1	0
50	(Serbia)	FW	Lazar Marković	1	0	0	0	0	0	1	0
51	(Serbia)	FW	Ognjen Ožegović	1	0	0	0	0	0	1	0
72	(Serbia)	DF	Slobodan Urošević	3	0	0	0	0	0	3	0
73	(Serbia)	DF	Nemanja Miletić	2	0	1	0	2	0	5	0
80	(Serbia)	MF	Filip Stevanović	1	0	1	0	1	0	3	0
85	(Serbia)	GK	Nemanja Stevanović	1	0	0	1	0	0	1	1
88	(Serbia)	GK	Vladimir Stojković	3	0	1	0	3	0	7	0
91	(Serbia)	FW	Bojan Matić	2	0	0	0	0	0	2	0
99	(Serbia)	MF	Milan Smiljanić	2	0	0	0	0	0	2	0
			TOTALS	53	1	11	1	22	0	86	2

Last updated: 24 June 2020

=== Game as captain ===
Rank	No.	Pos	Nat	Name	SuperLiga	Serbian Cup	Europe	Total
1	88	GK	(Serbia)	Vladimir Stojković	25	3	12	40
2	7	MF	(Serbia)	Zoran Tošić	3	0	0	3
3	99	MF	(Serbia)	Milan Smiljanić	1	1	0	2
4	73	DF	(Serbia)	Nemanja Miletić	0	1	0	1
4	23	DF	(Serbia)	Bojan Ostojić	1	0	0	1
Totals					30	5	12	47

Last updated: 24 June 2020

* Players sold or loaned out during the season
