= 2018–19 FK Partizan season =

FK Partizan
2018–19 season
- President: Milorad Vučelić
- Head coach: Miroslav Đukić (until 3 August 2018); Zoran Mirković (until 10 March 2019); Savo Milošević
- Stadium: Partizan Stadium
- SuperLiga: 3rd place
- Serbian Cup: Winner
- Europa League: Play-off round
- Top goalscorer: League: Ricardo Gomes (20); All: Ricardo Gomes (26)
- Highest home attendance: 22,500 vs Red Star Belgrade (23 September 2018)
- Lowest home attendance: 0 vs Čukarički (13 April 2019)
- Average home league attendance: 4,522
| Home colours | Away colours | Third colours |
- All statistics correct as of May 23, 2019.

The 2018–19 season will be Fudbalski Klub Partizan's 72nd season in existence and the club's 13th competing in the Serbian SuperLiga.

== Transfers ==
=== In ===
| Date | Position | Name | From | Type | Ref. |
|---|---|---|---|---|---|
| 28 May 2018 | FW | (Serbia) Nemanja Nikolić | (Serbia) Spartak Subotica | Transfer | |
| 8 June 2018 | FW | (Cape Verde) Ricardo Gomes | (Portugal) Nacional | Free transfer | |
| 21 June 2018 | RB | (Romania) Gabriel Enache | (Russia) Rubin Kazan | Free transfer | |
| 27 June 2018 | CB | (Spain) Marc Valiente | (Belgium) Eupen | Free transfer | |
| 1 July 2018 | DF | (Bosnia and Herzegovina) Aleksandar Subić | (Serbia) Radnički Niš | Loan return | |
| 1 July 2018 | GK | (Serbia) Filip Kljajić | (Greece) Platanias | Loan return | |
| 23 July 2018 | DM | (Serbia) Milan Smiljanić | (Israel) Hapoel Ashkelon | Free transfer | |
| 3 August 2018 | MF | (Bosnia and Herzegovina) Goran Zakarić | (Bosnia and Herzegovina) Željezničar | Transfer | |
| 21 August 2018 | MF | (Montenegro) Aleksandar Šćekić | (Turkey) Gençlerbirliği | Transfer | |
| 17 January 2019 | MF | (Norway) Moussa Njie | (Norway) Stabæk | Transfer | |
| 18 January 2019 | CB | (Serbia) Strahinja Bošnjak | (Serbia) Zemun | Loan return | |
| 18 January 2019 | MF | (Serbia) Strahinja Jovanović | (Serbia) Proleter Novi Sad | Loan return | |
| 23 January 2019 | FW | (Serbia) Dejan Georgijević | (Hungary) Ferencvárosi | Loan | |
| 24 January 2019 | FW | (Serbia) Radivoj Bosić | (Serbia) Red Star Belgrade | Free Transfer | |

=== Out ===
| Date | Position | Name | To | Type | Ref. |
|---|---|---|---|---|---|
| 19 June 2018 | MF | (Serbia) Jovan Nišić | (Serbia) Voždovac | Free transfer | |
| 19 June 2018 | MF | (Serbia) Veljko Birmančević | (Serbia) Čukarički | Loan | |
| 28 June 2018 | GK | (Serbia) Nemanja Stevanović | (Serbia) Čukarički | Loan | |
| 1 July 2018 | DF | (Serbia) Nemanja Antonov | (Switzerland) Grasshopper | Loan return | |
| 10 July 2018 | FW | (Cameroon) Léandre Tawamba | (Saudi Arabia) Al-Taawoun | Transfer | |
| 10 July 2018 | DF | (Serbia) Strahinja Bošnjak | (Serbia) Zemun | Loan | |
| 16 July 2018 | DF | (Serbia) Milan Mitrović | (Turkey) Adana Demirspor | Free transfer | |
| 18 July 2018 | MF | (Serbia) Strahinja Jovanović | (Serbia) Proleter Novi Sad | Loan | |
| 19 July 2018 | MF | (Serbia) Marko Jevtović | (Turkey) Konyaspor | Transfer | |
| 24 July 2018 | MF | (Ukraine) Yuri Vakulko | (Ukraine) Arsenal Kyiv | Loan | |
| 2 August 2018 | FW | (Serbia) Đorđe Jovanović | (Belgium) Lokeren | Transfer | |
| 12 August 2018 | MF | (Burkina Faso) Dramane Salou | (Serbia) Teleoptik | Loan | |
| 29 August 2018 | GK | (Serbia) Aleksandar Popović | (Serbia) Teleoptik | Loan | |
| 3 September 2018 | FW | (Serbia) Ognjen Ožegović | (Russia) Arsenal Tula | Loan | |
| 12 September 2018 | FW | (Serbia) Vladimir Đilas | (Serbia) Jedinstvo Surčin | Free transfer | |
| 14 September 2018 | MF | (Guinea) Seydouba Soumah | (Israel) Maccabi Haifa | Loan | |
| 15 January 2019 | DF | (Serbia) Luka Cucin | (Serbia) Spartak Subotica | Loan | |
| 21 January 2019 | MF | (Serbia) Jovan Kokir | (Serbia) Teleoptik | Loan | |
| 25 January 2019 | DF | (Serbia) Strahinja Bošnjak | (Serbia) Voždovac | Free Transfer | |
| 30 January 2019 | GK | (Serbia) Marko Jovičić | (Malta) Hibernians | Loan | |
| 31 January 2019 | MF | (Montenegro) Marko Janković | (Italy) SPAL | Transfer | |
| 25 February 2019 | DF | (Romania) Gabriel Enache | (Romania) Dunărea Călărași | Loan | |
| 30 March 2019 | MF | (Montenegro) Nebojša Kosović | (Kazakhstan) Kairat | Transfer | |

== Players ==
=== Squad ===
| No. | Name | Nationality | Position (s) | Date of Birth (Age) | Signed from | Notes |
Goalkeepers
| 12 | Filip Kljajić | (Serbia) | GK | 16 August 1990 (age 36) | (Serbia) Rad | |
| 61 | Aleksandar Popović | (Serbia) | GK | 29 September 1999 (age 26) | Youth system | |
| 88 | Vladimir Stojković | (Serbia) | GK | 28 July 1983 (age 43) | (England) Nottingham Forest | Third captain |
Defenders
| 3 | Strahinja Pavlović | (Serbia) | CB | 24 May 2001 (age 25) | Youth system | |
| 4 | Miroslav Vulićević | (Serbia) | RB | 29 May 1985 (age 41) | (Serbia) Vojvodina | Vice-captain |
| 6 | Marc Valiente | (Spain) | CB | 29 March 1987 (age 39) | (Belgium) Eupen | |
| 15 | Svetozar Marković | (Serbia) (Bosnia and Herzegovina) | CB | 23 March 2000 (age 26) | Youth system | |
| 17 | Zlatan Šehović | (Serbia) | LB | 8 August 2000 (age 26) | (Serbia) Teleoptik | |
| 23 | Bojan Ostojić | (Serbia) | CB | 12 February 1984 (age 42) | (Serbia) Čukarički | |
| 26 | Nemanja G. Miletić | (Serbia) | LB | 26 July 1991 (age 35) | (Serbia) Javor Ivanjica | |
| 72 | Slobodan Urošević | (Serbia) | LB | 15 April 1994 (age 32) | (Serbia) Napredak Kruševac | |
| 73 | Nemanja R. Miletić | (Serbia) | CB / RB | 16 January 1991 (age 26) | (Belgium) Westerlo | |
Midfielders
| 7 | Zoran Tošić | (Serbia) | AM / LW / RW | 28 April 1987 (age 39) | (Russia) CSKA Moscow | |
| 8 | Armin Đerlek | (Serbia) | AM | 15 July 2000 (age 26) | (Serbia) OFK Beograd | |
| 10 | Lazar Pavlović | (Serbia) | AM | 2 November 2001 (age 24) | Youth system | |
| 16 | Saša Zdjelar | (Serbia) | DM | 20 March 1995 (age 31) | (Greece) Olympiacos | |
| 19 | Aleksandar Šćekić | (Montenegro) (Serbia) | DM | 12 December 1991 (age 34) | (Turkey) Gençlerbirliği | |
| 21 | Moussa Njie | (Norway) | LW | 2 October 1995 (age 30) | (Norway) Stabæk | |
| 22 | Saša Ilić | (Serbia) | CM / AM | 30 December 1977 (age 48) | (Austria) Red Bull Salzburg | Captain |
| 55 | Danilo Pantić | (Serbia) | LM / AM / CM | 26 October 1996 (age 29) | (England) Chelsea | Loan; Fourth captain |
| 77 | Goran Zakarić | (Bosnia and Herzegovina) | RW | 7 November 1992 (age 33) | (Bosnia and Herzegovina) Željezničar Sarajevo | |
| 80 | Filip Stevanović | (Serbia) | ST | 25 September 2002 (age 23) | Youth system | |
| 99 | Milan Smiljanić | (Serbia) | DM | 19 November 1986 (age 39) | (Israel) Hapoel Ashkelon | |
Forwards
| 9 | Nemanja Nikolić | (Serbia) | ST | 19 October 1992 (age 33) | (Serbia) Spartak Subotica | |
| 11 | Ricardo Gomes | (Cape Verde) | ST | 18 December 1991 (age 34) | (Portugal) Nacional | |
| 14 | Dejan Georgijević | (Serbia) | ST | 19 January 1994 (age 32) | (Hungary) Ferencváros | Loan |
| 18 | Đorđe Ivanović | (Serbia) (Croatia) | ST / CF | 20 November 1995 (age 30) | (Serbia) Spartak Subotica | |
| 45 | Radivoj Bosić | (Serbia) | CF | 1 December 2000 (age 25) | (Serbia) Red Star Belgrade | |

== Friendlies ==
| 21 June 2018 Friendly | Partizan (Serbia) | 2–1 | (Serbia) Mačva Šabac | Belgrade, Serbia |
| 12:00 | Tawamba; Đerlek | Report | Gigić | Stadium: SC Partizan-Teleoptik |

| 25 June 2018 Friendly | Partizan (Serbia) | 2–0 | (Hungary) Honvéd | Odranci, Slovenia |
| 17:30 | Soumah 22'; Nikolić 61' | Report | | Stadium: Športni Park Odranci; Attendance: 50; Referee: (Slovenia) Bojan Mertik |

| 27 June 2018 Friendly | Partizan (Serbia) | 1–0 | (Poland) Cracovia | Kidričevo, Slovenia |
| 17:30 | Đerlek 35' | Report | | Stadium: Aluminij Sports Park; Attendance: 50; Referee: (Slovenia) Niko Mihaelič |

| 29 June 2018 Friendly | Partizan (Serbia) | 0–2 | (Russia) Rostov | Gornja Radgona, Slovenia |
| 18:00 | | Report | Mirzov 20'; Kalachev 22' | Stadium: Gornja Radgona Stadium; Attendance: 50; Referee: (Slovenia) Slavko Nemet |

| 1 July 2018 Friendly | Partizan (Serbia) | 3–0 | (Slovenia) Gorica | Stojnci, Slovenia |
| 18:00 | Ožegović 14'; Vulićević 70'; Urošević 85' | Report | | Stadium: Stojnci Sports Park; Attendance: 100; Referee: (Slovenia) Roman Glažar |

| 3 July 2018 Friendly | Partizan (Serbia) | 0–1 | (Ukraine) Zorya Luhansk | Kidričevo, Slovenia |
| 18:00 | | Report | Hordiyenko 89' | Stadium: Aluminij Sports Park; Attendance: 50; Referee: (Slovenia) Janko Golub |

| 8 September 2018 Friendly | Partizan (Serbia) | 3–1 | (Serbia) Teleoptik | Belgrade, Serbia |
| | Ivanović | Report | Miletić (o.g.) | Stadium: SC Partizan-Teleoptik |

| 13 October 2018 Friendly | Polet Sivac (Serbia) | 0–2 | (Serbia) Partizan | Sivac, Serbia |
| 14:00 | | Report | Enache 1', 90' | Stadium: Sivac Stadium; Attendance: 2,500; Referee: (Serbia) Dejan Šćepanović |

| 20 January 2019 Friendly | Partizan (Serbia) | 4–1 | (Serbia) Teleoptik | Belgrade, Serbia |
| 12:00 | Tošić; Zakarić; Nije; Ivanović | Report | Guzina | Stadium: SC Partizan-Teleoptik |

| 28 January 2019 Friendly | Slovan Liberec (Czech Republic) | 1–0 | (Serbia) Partizan | Antalya, Turkey |
| 13:00 | Lehoczki 68' | Report | | Stadium: Sueno lux hotel Stadium; Attendance: 100; Referee: (Poland) Wojciech Myć |

| 31 January 2019 Friendly | Cracovia (Poland) | 1–0 | (Serbia) Partizan | Antalya, Turkey |
| 15:00 | Cabrera 64' (pen.) | Report | | Stadium: Fanatic agency Stadium; Attendance: 100; Referee: (Armenia) Gevorg Yechoyan |

| 3 February 2019 Friendly | Shakhtar Donetsk (Ukraine) | 0–2 | (Serbia) Partizan | Antalya, Turkey |
| 15:00 | | Report | Nikolić 8'; Šćekić 39' | Stadium: Cornelia Diamond stadium Attendance: 150; Referee: (Turkey) Niyazi Toksan |

| 6 February 2019 Friendly | Krylia Sovetov (Russia) | 0–0 | (Serbia) Partizan | Antalya, Turkey |
| 15:00 | | Report | | Stadium: Gloria sports Arena; Attendance: 100; Referee: (Russia) Kirill Levnikov |

| 7 February 2019 Friendly | Mladost Doboj Kakanj (Bosnia and Herzegovina) | 0–2 | (Serbia) Partizan | Antalya, Turkey |
| 13:00 | | Report | Gomes 75' (pen.); Marković 85' | Stadium: Suesi hotel stadium Attendance: 50; Referee: (Ukraine) Yaroslav Kozik |

== Competitions ==
=== Overview ===
| Competition | Record | | | | | | | |
| Competition | P | W | D | L | GF | GA | GD | Win % |
|---|---|---|---|---|---|---|---|---|
| Serbian SuperLiga | 37 | 20 | 9 | 8 | 58 | 28 | +30 | 54.05 |
| Serbian Cup | 6 | 5 | 1 | 0 | 11 | 2 | +9 | 83.33 |
| UEFA Europa League | 8 | 5 | 2 | 1 | 14 | 8 | +6 | 62.50 |
| Total | 51 | 30 | 12 | 9 | 83 | 38 | +45 | 58.82 |

==== Regular season ====
===== League table =====
| Pos | Team | Pld | W | D | L | GF | GA | GD | Pts | Qualification |
|---|---|---|---|---|---|---|---|---|---|---|
| 1 | Red Star Belgrade | 30 | 27 | 3 | 0 | 80 | 16 | +64 | 84 | Qualification for the Championship round |
| 2 | Radnički Niš | 30 | 23 | 6 | 1 | 58 | 17 | +41 | 75 | Qualification for the Championship round |
| 3 | Partizan | 30 | 15 | 9 | 6 | 45 | 20 | +25 | 54 | Qualification for the Championship round |
| 4 | Čukarički | 30 | 15 | 9 | 6 | 48 | 25 | +23 | 54 | Qualification for the Championship round |
| 5 | Mladost Lučani | 30 | 13 | 7 | 10 | 39 | 29 | +10 | 46 | Qualification for the Championship round |

Source: SuperLiga (in Serbian), Soccerway
Rules for classification: 1) Points; 2) Head-to-head points; 3) Head-to-head goal difference; 4) Head-to-head goals scored; 5) Head-to-head away goals scored (if two teams tied); 6) Goal difference; 7) Goals scored; 8) Fair play ranking; 9) Draw.

===== Results by matchday =====
| Round | 1 | 2 | 3 | 4 | 5 | 6 | 7 | 8 | 9 | 10 | 11 | 12 | 13 | 14 | 15 | 16 | 17 | 18 | 19 | 20 | 21 | 22 | 23 | 24 | 25 | 26 | 27 | 28 | 29 | 30 |
|---|---|---|---|---|---|---|---|---|---|---|---|---|---|---|---|---|---|---|---|---|---|---|---|---|---|---|---|---|---|---|
| Ground | A | A | H | A | H | A | H | A | H | A | H | A | H | A | H | H | H | A | H | A | H | A | H | A | H | A | H | A | H | A |
| Result | L | W | D | W | W | W | W | W | D | D | W | D | D | D | W | W | W | D | W | W | D | W | W | D | L | L | L | L | W | L |
| Position | 13 | 10 | 9 | 6 | 7 | 5 | 3 | 3 | 3 | 3 | 2 | 4 | 3 | 3 | 3 | 3 | 3 | 3 | 3 | 3 | 3 | 3 | 3 | 3 | 3 | 3 | 3 | 4 | 3 | 3 |

Updated to match(es) played on 7 April 2019. Source: Partizan
A = Away; H = Home; W = Win; D = Draw; L = Loss

=== Results ===
| 22 July 2018 1 | Radnik Surdulica | 1–0 | Partizan | Surdulica |
| 19:00 | Zlatanović 51' (yellow card) 58'; Čubrilo (yellow card) 64'; Pavlović (yellow card) 73'; Vasiljević (yellow card) 90+5'; Ristović (yellow card) 90+6' | Report | Valiente (yellow card) 85' | Stadium: Surdulica City Stadium; Attendance: 2,000; Referee: (Serbia) Nenad Đokić |

| 29 July 2018 2 | Dinamo Vranje | 0–1 | Partizan | Surdulica |
| 19:00 | Vukajlović (yellow card) 29'; Đurić (yellow card) 49' (yellow-red card) 57'; Suraka (yellow card) 56' | Report | Ožegović (yellow card) 59' (goal) 82'; Kosović (yellow card) 77'; Janković (yellow card) 80' | Stadium: Surdulica City Stadium; Attendance: 2,000; Referee: (Serbia) Novica Anđelovski |

| 5 August 2018 3 | Partizan | 0–0 | Mladost Lučani | Belgrade |
| 19:00 | | Report | Pejović (yellow card) 23'; Tumbasević (yellow card) 78'; Sinđić (yellow card) 90' | Stadium: Partizan Stadium; Attendance: 2,821; Referee: (Serbia) Dragan Čolović |

| 12 August 2018 4 | Zemun | 0–1 | Partizan | Belgrade |
| 17:00 | Stojković (yellow card) 6' | Report | Ožegović 20'; Soumah (yellow card) 42'; Đerlek (yellow card) 45'; Zakarić (yellow card) 90'; Enache (yellow card) 90+4' | Stadium: Zemun Stadium; Attendance: 3,000; Referee: (Serbia) Danilo Grujić |

| 19 September 2018* 5 | Partizan | 1–0 | Rad | Belgrade |
| 17:00 | Janković 49'; Zakarić (yellow card) 53'; Vulićević (yellow card) 70' | Report | Mladenović (yellow card) 12' (yellow-red card) 64'; Lutovac (yellow card) 34'; Perendija (yellow card) 64' | Stadium: Partizan Stadium; Attendance: 2,500; Referee: (Serbia) Miloš Đorđić |

| 26 August 2018 6 | Mačva | 1–3 | Partizan | Šabac |
| 19:30 | Gavrić 36' (yellow card) 37'; Adamović (yellow card) 57'; Marić (yellow card) 67'; Gemović (yellow card) 67'; Lazarević (yellow card) 78' | Report | Pantić (yellow card) 39' (goal) 81'; Marković (yellow card) 56'; Gomes (yellow card) 64' (goal) 87'; Nikolić 68'; Miletić (yellow card) 56' | Stadium: Gradski stadion Šabac; Attendance: 5,000; Referee: (Serbia) Miloš Đorđić |

| 2 September 2018 7 | Partizan | 1–0 | Bačka | Belgrade |
| 21:00 | Kosović (yellow card) 45+3'; Marković 49'; Miletić (red card) 72'; Vulićević (yellow card) 88'; Nikolić (yellow card) 90' | Report | Zogović (yellow card) 43'; Pantić (yellow card) 56'; Makarić (yellow card) 72'; Jovanović (yellow card) 76' | Stadium: Partizan Stadium; Attendance: 2,284; Referee: (Serbia) Aleksandar Živković |

| 15 September 2018 8 | Proleter Novi Sad | 0–1 | Partizan | Novi Sad |
| 16:00 | Ćuković (yellow card) 22'; Bukorac (yellow card) 28' | Report | Gomes 13'; Janković (yellow card) 48'; Šćekić (yellow card) 56'; Stojković (yellow card) 73' | Stadium: Karađorđe Stadium; Attendance: 3,000; Referee: (Serbia) Bojan Nikolić |

| 23 September 2018 9 | Partizan | 1–1 | Red Star Belgrade | Belgrade |
| 19:00 | Gomes 33'; Zdjelar (yellow card) 43'; Zakarić (yellow card) 90' | Report | Krstičić (yellow card) 61'; Boakye 73' | Stadium: Partizan Stadium; Attendance: 22,500; Referee: (Serbia) Danilo Grujić |

| 30 September 2018 10 | Radnički Niš | 2–2 | Partizan | Niš |
| 19:00 | Haskić 35'; Crnomarković (yellow card) 40'; Stojanović 47'; Grbić (yellow card) 58'; Drinčić (yellow card) 65'; Mitrović (yellow card) 87'; Stanisavljević (yellow card) 90' | Report | Marković (yellow card) 26'; Miletić (yellow card) 30'; Janković (yellow card) 45'; Valiente (yellow card) 76'; Nikolić 79'; Miletić 85' | Stadium: Čair Stadium; Attendance: 6,000; Referee: (Serbia) Milorad Mažić |

| 5 October 2018 11 | Partizan | 4–0 | Voždovac | Belgrade |
| 18:00 | Miletić 19'; Zakarić 41', 71'; Đerlek (yellow card) 44'; Šćekić (yellow card) 45'; Urošević (yellow card) 67'; Ivanović 90+4' | Report | Maksimović (yellow card) 21' | Stadium: Partizan Stadium; Attendance: 3,000; Referee: (Serbia) Zoran Široki |

| 21 October 2018 12 | Spartak Subotica | 0–0 | Partizan | Kula |
| 13:00 | Tekijaški (yellow card) 29'; Milošević (yellow card) 38'; Ćalasan (yellow card) 53'; Marčić (yellow card) 55'; Torbica (yellow card) 90+4' | Report | Šćekić (yellow card) 31' | Stadium: Stadion Hajduk; Attendance: 3,000; Referee: (Serbia) Aleksandar Vasić |

| 27 October 2018 13 | Partizan | 1–1 | Napredak Kruševac | Belgrade |
| 16:00 | Nikolić 12'; Đerlek (yellow card) 33' (yellow-red card) 73'; Gomes (yellow card) 43'; Janković (yellow card) 80' | Report | Ostojić (yellow card) 37'; Veškovac (yellow card) 43'; Vukanović 62'; Baha (yellow card) 75'; Vulić (yellow card) 83' | Stadium: Partizan Stadium; Attendance: 2,000; Referee: (Serbia) Novak Simović |

| 31 October 2018 14 | Čukarički | 1–1 | Partizan | Belgrade |
| 16:30 | Stojanović (yellow card) 69'; Mudrinski 82' (yellow card) 90+5'; Bogosavac (yellow card) 90' | Report | Enache 4'; Pantić (yellow card) 39' | Stadium: Čukarički Stadium; Attendance: 1,500; Referee: (Serbia) Bojan Nikolić |

| 4 November 2018 15 | Partizan | 2–0 | Vojvodina | Belgrade |
| 19:00 | Gomes 29'; Miletić (yellow card) 52'; Enache 89' | Report | Milojević (yellow card) 16'; Đuričin (yellow card) 18' | Stadium: Partizan Stadium; Attendance: 3,000; Referee: (Serbia) Danilo Grujić |

| 10 November 2018 16 | Partizan | 2–0 | Radnik Surdulica | Belgrade |
| 13:00 | Gomes 42'; Stojković (yellow card) 86'; Ivanović 89' | Report | Pantelić (yellow card) 49' | Stadium: Partizan Stadium; Attendance: 3,000; Referee: (Serbia) Igor Stojilković |

| 25 November 2018 17 | Partizan | 6–0 | Dinamo Vranje | Belgrade |
| 17:00 | Pantić 37', 55'; Gomes 42', 78'; Nikolić (yellow card) 66' (goal) 90'; Ivanović 86' | Report | | Stadium: Partizan Stadium; Attendance: 1,000; Referee: (Serbia) Nenad Mikanović |

| 1 December 2018 18 | Mladost Lučani | 1–1 | Partizan | Lučani |
| 15:30 | Odita (yellow card) 47'; Pavlović 83' (yellow card) 84' | Report | Urošević (yellow card) 51' (yellow-red card) 90+5'; Ivanović 90+2'; Stojković (yellow card) 90+6' | Stadium: Mladost Stadium; Attendance: 1,500; Referee: (Serbia) Igor Stojilković |

| 5 December 2018 19 | Partizan | 1–0 | Zemun | Belgrade |
| 18:30 | Zdjelar (yellow card) 19'; Gomes 42'; Pantić (yellow card) 55' | Report | Azemović (yellow card) 4'; Mrkaić (yellow card) 8'; Stojković (yellow card) 58'; Đalović (yellow card) 71' | Stadium: Partizan Stadium; Attendance: 3,500; Referee: (Serbia) Lazar Lukić |

| 9 December 2018 20 | Rad | 0–3 | Partizan | Belgrade |
| 17:00 | Lutovac (yellow card) 43'; Kasalica (yellow card) 74'; Marinković (yellow card) 90' | Report | Gomes 5', 71'; Miletić 10' | Stadium: Rad Stadium; Attendance: 1,000; Referee: (Serbia) Milan Ilić |

| 14 December 2018 21 | Partizan | 0–0 | Mačva Šabac | Belgrade |
| 18:00 | Urošević (yellow card) 42' (yellow-red card) 45'; Pantić (yellow card) 61'; Valiente (yellow card) 90+2'; Zdjelar (yellow card) 90+7' | Report | Ivić (yellow card) 55'; Kosanić (yellow card) 80'; Puletić (yellow card) 90+1'; Tošić (yellow card) 90+7' | Stadium: Partizan Stadium; Attendance: 1,300; Referee: (Serbia) Aleksandar Živković |

| 16 February 2019 22 | Bačka Bačka Palanka | 0–3 | Partizan | Bačka Palanka |
| 13:00 | Jovanović (yellow card) 78' | Report | Nikolić 7'; Gomes 56'; Zakarić 80' | Stadium: Slavko Maletin Vava Stadium; Attendance: 4,500; Referee: (Serbia) Milorad Mažić |

| 23 February 2019 23 | Partizan | 3–0 | Proleter Novi Sad | Belgrade |
| 19:00 | Pavlović (yellow card) 10'; Nikolić 16'; Miletić (yellow card) 24'; Gomes 41', 45+1'; Đerlek (yellow card) 70'; Stevanović (yellow card) 84' | Report | Lambulić (red card) 17'; Krasić (yellow card) 89' | Stadium: Partizan Stadium; Attendance: 6,452; Referee: (Serbia) Lazar Tripković |

| 2 March 2019 24 | Red Star Belgrade | 1–1 | Partizan | Belgrade |
| 18:00 | Marin (yellow card) 27'; Pavkov 74'; Ivanić (yellow card) 75'; Stojković (yellow card) 89'; Čaušić (yellow card) 89' | Report | Pavlović (yellow card) 18'; Zdjelar (yellow card) 27'; Nikolić 37' (yellow card) 89'; Zakarić (yellow card) 50'; Miletić (yellow card) 53'; Urošević (yellow card) 89' | Stadium: Red Star Stadium; Attendance: 35,000; Referee: (Serbia) Danilo Grujić |

| 6 March 2019 25 | Partizan | 0–1 | Radnički Niš | Belgrade |
| 18:00 | Pantić (yellow card) 63'; Valiente (yellow card) 90+3' | Report | Haskić 41' (yellow card) 53'; Đorđević (yellow card) 46'; Bondarenko (yellow card) 64'; Ristić (yellow card) 80' | Stadium: Partizan Stadium; Attendance: 8,752; Referee: (Serbia) Srđan Jovanović |

| 10 March 2019 26 | Voždovac | 1–0 | Partizan | Belgrade |
| 17:00 | Srnić 60'; Purtić (yellow card) 90+2' | Report | Pavlović (yellow card) 86'; Zdjelar (yellow card) 90+4' | Stadium: Voždovac Stadium; Attendance: 1,000; Referee: (Serbia) Momčilo Marković |

| 16 March 2019 27 | Partizan | 1–3 | Spartak Subotica | Belgrade |
| 15:00 | Gomes 8' (pen.); Miletić (yellow card) 56' | Report | Denković 18'; Milošević (yellow card) 46'; Đenić 50' (yellow card) 55'; Marčić (yellow card) 74'; Đorđević (yellow card) 87'; Otašević (yellow card) 90+2'; Obradović 90+4' | Stadium: Partizan Stadium; Attendance: 2,500; Referee: (Serbia) Miloš Milanović |

| 31 March 2019 28 | Napredak Kruševac | 1–0 | Partizan | Kruševac |
| 17:00 | Đorić 18' (yellow card) 62'; Ivanović (yellow card) 34'; Aksentijević (yellow card) 45+1'; Veškovac (yellow card) 86' | Report | Nikolić (yellow card) 90+3' | Stadium: Mladost Stadium; Attendance: 3,000; Referee: (Serbia) Novica Anđelovski |

| 3 April 2019 29 | Partizan | 3–2 | Čukarički | Belgrade |
| 19:00 | Gomes 33'; Tošić 73', 78' | Report | Šapić (yellow card) 9'; Kopitović (yellow card) 16'; Stojanović 36'; Luković 58'; Docić (yellow card) 70' | Stadium: Partizan Stadium; Attendance: 1,558; Referee: (Serbia) Jovan Šegrt |

| 7 April 2019 30 | Vojvodina | 3–2 | Partizan | Novi Sad |
| 17:00 | Matić 3' 90+9' (yellow card) 90+10'; Mitošević (yellow card) 33'; Zlomislić (yellow card) 45+3'; Gajić 90+17' | Report | Tošić 45+4'; Zakarić (yellow card) 23'; Valiente (yellow card) 29'; Urošević (yellow card) 83'; Ivanović 90+18' | Stadium: Karađorđe Stadium; Attendance: 5,000; Referee: (Serbia) Miloš Đorđić |

==== Championship round ====
| Pos | Team | Pld | W | D | L | GF | GA | GD | Pts | Qualification |
|---|---|---|---|---|---|---|---|---|---|---|
| 1 | Red Star Belgrade (C) | 37 | 33 | 3 | 1 | 97 | 20 | +77 | 60 | Qualification for the Champions League first qualifying round |
| 2 | Radnički Niš | 37 | 25 | 10 | 2 | 71 | 30 | +41 | 48 | Qualification for the Europa League first qualifying round |
| 3 | Partizan | 37 | 20 | 9 | 8 | 58 | 28 | +30 | 42 | Qualification for the Europa League second qualifying round (Note: Partizan qualified for the Europa League second qualifying round by winning the 2018–19 Serbian Cup. As a result, the spot awarded to the third-placed team (Europa League first qualifying round) was passed to the fourth-placed team.) |
| 4 | Čukarički | 37 | 18 | 12 | 7 | 63 | 36 | +27 | 39 | Qualification for the Europa League first qualifying round |
| 5 | Mladost Lučani | 37 | 16 | 9 | 12 | 49 | 37 | +12 | 34 | |

Source: SuperLiga (in Serbian), Soccerway
Rules for classification: 1) Points; 2) Head-to-head points; 3) Head-to-head goal difference; 4) Head-to-head goals scored; 5) Head-to-head away goals scored (if two teams tied); 6) Goal difference; 7) Goals scored; 8) Fair play ranking; 9) Draw.
(C) Champions

===== Results by matchday =====
| Round | 1 | 2 | 3 | 4 | 5 | 6 | 7 |
|---|---|---|---|---|---|---|---|
| Ground | H | A | A | H | H | A | H |
| Result | W | L | L | W | W | W | W |
| Position | 3 | 3 | 5 | 4 | 4 | 3 | 3 |

Updated to match(es) played on 19 May 2019. Source: Partizan
A = Away; H = Home; W = Win; D = Draw; L = Loss

===== Results =====
| 13 April 2019 31 | Partizan | 3–0 | Čukarički | Belgrade |
| 19:00 | Gomes 31'; Miletić (yellow card) 35'; Zakarić 52'; Zdjelar 87'; Pantić (yellow card) 90'; Stojković (yellow card) 90+1' | Report | Stevanović (yellow card) 28'; Owusu (yellow card) 90' | Stadium: Partizan Stadium; Attendance: 0 Referee: (Serbia) Novica Anđelovski |

| 21 April 2019 32 | Radnički Niš | 3–1 | Partizan | Niš |
| 18:30 | Stojanović 45+4'; Grbić 48'; Ranđelović 52'; Nikodijević (yellow card) 88' | Report | Miletić (yellow card) 28'; Ivanović 42'; Marković (yellow card) 77' | Stadium: Čair Stadium; Attendance: 4,000; Referee: (Serbia) Bojan Nikolić |

| 25 April 2019 33 | Red Star Belgrade | 2–1 | Partizan | Belgrade |
| 19:00 | Babić (yellow card) 39'; Ben 60' (pen.); Jovičić (yellow card) 63'; Vukanović 80'; Borjan (yellow card) 90'; Stojković (yellow card) 90+5' | Report | Pavlović (yellow card) 45+2' (yellow-red card) 90+4'; Šćekić (yellow card) 53'; Urošević (yellow card) 59'; Miletić (yellow card) 86'; Gomes 90' (pen.) | Stadium: Red Star Stadium; Attendance: 21,862; Referee: (Serbia) Novak Simović |

| 1 May 2019 34 | Partizan | 2–1 | Mladost Lučani | Belgrade |
| 18:00 | Gomes 11'; Zdjelar (yellow card) 53'; Tošić 58'; Šehović (yellow card) 64'; Marković (yellow card) 66'; Valiente (yellow card) 83'; Zakarić (yellow card) 89'; Stojković (yellow card) 90+2' | Report | Leković (yellow card) 24'; Jovanović (yellow card) 25'; Pešić (yellow card) 30'; Bojić 84' | Stadium: Partizan Stadium; Attendance: 2,000; Referee: (Serbia) Zoran Široki |

| 5 May 2019 35 | Partizan | 2–1 | Napredak Kruševac | Belgrade |
| 18:00 | Pantić 63'; Šćekić 90+3' | Report | Ilić 20'; Ostojić (yellow card) 63'; Petrović (yellow card) 82'; Marinković (yellow card) 90+3'; Alivodić (yellow card) 90+5' | Stadium: Partizan Stadium; Attendance: 2,044; Referee: (Serbia) Bojan Nikolić |

| 11 May 2019 36 | Vojvodina | 1–2 | Partizan | Novi Sad |
| 16:00 | Đurić 9' (pen.); Gojkov (yellow card) 80' | Report | Gomes 6'; Pavlović (yellow card) 8'; Smiljanić (yellow card) 53'; Ivanović 83' (pen.) (yellow card) 83' | Stadium: Karađorđe Stadium; Attendance: 3,000; Referee: (Serbia) Momčilo Marković |

| 19 May 2019 37 | Partizan | 2–0 | Proleter Novi Sad | Belgrade |
| 19:00 | Pantić 25'; Gomes 55' | Report | | Stadium: Partizan Stadium; Attendance: 15,700; Referee: (Serbia) Nikola Radaković |

=== Serbian Cup ===
| 26 September 2018 First round | Kolubara | 1–2 | Partizan | Lazarevac |
| 15:00 | Matijević 76'; Kaličanin (yellow card) 78' | Report | Nikolić 19'; Đerlek 49' (yellow card) 88' | Stadium: Kolubara Stadium; Attendance: 2,500; Referee: (Serbia) Nenad Minaković |

| 24 October 2018 Second round | Zemun | 0–2 | Partizan | Belgrade |
| 14:00 | Lukić (yellow card) 23' | Report | Marković 50'; Zdjelar (yellow card) 59'; Zakarić 89' | Stadium: Zemun Stadium; Attendance: 3,000; Referee: (Serbia) Momčilo Marković |

| 13 March 2019 Quarterfinals | Napredak Kruševac | 0–4 | Partizan | Kruševac |
| 15:30 | Ostojić (yellow card) 25'; Aksentijević (yellow card) 35' | Report | Zakarić 31'; Pantić 45+2'; Valiente 66'; Gomes 72' | Stadium: Mladost Stadium; Attendance: 5,000; Referee: (Serbia) Zoran Široki |

| 17 April 2019 Semifinals 1st leg | Partizan | 1–0 | Radnički Niš | Belgrade |
| 18:00 | Gomes 28' | Report | Drinčić (yellow card) 28'; Pankov (yellow card) 38' | Stadium: Partizan Stadium; Attendance: 4,000; Referee: (Serbia) Srđan Jovanović |

| 15 May 2019 Semifinals 2nd leg | Radnički Niš | 1–1 (1-2 agg.) | Partizan | Niš |
| 20:00 | Crnomarković (yellow card) 30'; Todorovski (yellow card) 72'; Stojanović 75'; Nikodijević (yellow card) 86' | Report | Miletić (yellow card) 65'; Tošić 80'; Pantić (yellow card) 85'; Ilić (yellow card) 90+1' | Stadium: Čair Stadium; Attendance: 5,000; Referee: (Serbia) Lazar Lukić |

| 23 May 2019 Final | Red Star Belgrade | 0–1 | Partizan | Belgrade |
| 19:00 | Rodić (yellow card) 61' | Report | Ostojić 14'; Šćekić (yellow card) 46'; Pavlović (yellow card) 78'; Pavlović (yellow card) 90+4' | Stadium: Red Star Stadium; Attendance: 20,000; Referee: (Serbia) Novak Simović |

=== UEFA Europa League ===
==== First qualifying round ====
| 12 July 2018 First qualifying round | Rudar Pljevlja (Montenegro) | 0–3 | (Serbia) Partizan | Nikšić, Montenegro |
| 20:15 | Pešukić (yellow card) 87'; Mitrović (yellow card) 90' | Report | Jevtović 44' (pen.); Soumah 50'; Gomes 57' | Stadium: Gradski stadion Attendance: 3,150; Referee: Stuart Attwell (England) |

| 19 July 2018 First qualifying round | Partizan (Serbia) | 3–0 (6–0 agg.) | (Montenegro) Rudar Pljevlja | Belgrade, Serbia |
| 20:30 | Pantić 11'; Miletić (yellow card) 29'; Ivanović (yellow card) 40'; Ožegović 44'; Gomes 83' | Report | Sekulić (yellow card) 9'; Golubović (yellow card) 41' | Stadium: Partizan Stadium; Attendance: 5,869; Referee: Daniele Doveri (Italy) |

==== Second qualifying round ====
| 26 July 2018 Second qualifying round | Partizan (Serbia) | 1–0 | (Lithuania) Trakai | Belgrade, Serbia |
| 20:30 | Kosović (yellow card) 45+1'; Januševskij 57' (o.g.); Janković (yellow card) 75'; Zdjelar (yellow card) 90+3' | Report | Kazlauskas (yellow card) 14'; Vorobjovas (yellow card) 43' (yellow-red card) 53'; Januševskij (yellow card) 82' | Stadium: Partizan Stadium; Attendance: 6,210; Referee: Georgi Kabakov (Bulgaria) |

| 2 August 2018 Second qualifying round | Trakai (Lithuania) | 1–1 (1–2 agg.) | (Serbia) Partizan | Vilnius, Lithuania |
| 18:00 | Osipov 9' | Report | Valiente (yellow card) 23'; Soumah (yellow card) 38' (yellow-red card) 53'; Miletić 45+3' | Stadium: LFF Stadium; Attendance: 1,980; Referee: Stephan Klossner (Switzerland) |

==== Third qualifying round ====
| 9 August 2018 Third qualifying round | Nordsjælland (Denmark) | 1–2 | (Serbia) Partizan | Farum, Denmark |
| 19:45 | Nelsson (yellow card) 61'; Rasmussen 71'; Pedersen (yellow card) 85'; Damsgaard (yellow card) 90+5' | Report | Gomes 10'; Zakarić 64'; Janković (yellow card) 82'; Zdjelar (yellow card) 90+3' | Stadium: Right to Dream Park; Attendance: 6,079; Referee: Alejandro Hernández Hernández (Spain) |

| 16 August 2018 Third qualifying round | Partizan (Serbia) | 3–2 (5–3 agg.) | (Denmark) Nordsjælland | Belgrade, Serbia |
| 20:30 | Miletić 11' (yellow card) 87'; Janković 30'; Marković 35'; Zakarić (yellow card) 72'; Kosović (yellow card) 90'; Smiljanić (yellow card) 90+3' | Report | Skov Olsen 9'; Mumin (yellow card) 28'; Pedersen (yellow card) 41'; Amon 76' | Stadium: Partizan Stadium; Attendance: 9,372; Referee: Kristo Tohver (Estonia) |

==== Play-off round ====
| 23 August 2018 Play-off round | Partizan (Serbia) | 1–1 | (Turkey) Beşiktaş | Belgrade, Serbia |
| 20:30 | Gomes 14'; Kosović (yellow card) 38'; Ivanović (yellow card) 42'; Miletić (yellow card) 43'; Nikolić (yellow card) 80' | Report | Arslan 15' (yellow card) 65'; Erkin (yellow card) 59'; Larin (yellow card) 90+2' | Stadium: Partizan Stadium; Attendance: 16,240; Referee: Ivan Kružliak (Slovakia) |

| 30 August 2018 Play-off round | Beşiktaş (Turkey) | 3–0 (4–1 agg.) | (Serbia) Partizan | Istanbul, Turkey |
| 20:00 | Pepe 37' 69'; Özyakup 45+1' | Report | Miletić (yellow card) 43'; Gomes (yellow card) 63'; Nikolić (yellow card) 80' | Stadium: Beşiktaş Park; Attendance: 33,658; Referee: Ovidiu Hațegan (Romania) |

== Statistics ==
=== Goalscorers ===
| Rank | No. | Pos | Nat | Name | SuperLiga | Serbian Cup | Europe | Total |
|---|---|---|---|---|---|---|---|---|
| 1 | 11 | FW | (Cape Verde) | Ricardo Gomes | 20 | 2 | 4 | 26 |
| 2 | 9 | FW | (Serbia) | Nemanja Nikolić | 7 | 1 | 0 | 8 |
| 2 | 55 | MF | (Serbia) | Danilo Pantić | 6 | 1 | 1 | 8 |
| 3 | 77 | MF | (Bosnia and Herzegovina) | Goran Zakarić | 4 | 2 | 1 | 7 |
| 3 | 18 | FW | (Serbia) | Đorđe Ivanović | 7 | 0 | 0 | 7 |
| 4 | 73 | DF | (Serbia) | Nemanja Miletić | 3 | 0 | 2 | 5 |
| 4 | 7 | MF | (Serbia) | Zoran Tošić | 4 | 1 | 0 | 5 |
| 5 | 15 | DF | (Serbia) | Svetozar Marković | 1 | 1 | 1 | 3 |
| 6 | 51 | FW | (Serbia) | Ognjen Ožegović | 1 | 0 | 1 | 2 |
| 6 | 10 | MF | (Montenegro) | Marko Janković | 1 | 0 | 1 | 2 |
| 6 | 44 | DF | (Romania) | Gabriel Enache | 2 | 0 | 0 | 2 |
| 7 | 20 | MF | (Guinea) | Seydouba Soumah | 0 | 0 | 1 | 1 |
| 7 | 21 | MF | (Serbia) | Marko Jevtović | 0 | 0 | 1 | 1 |
| 7 | 8 | MF | (Serbia) | Armin Đerlek | 0 | 1 | 0 | 1 |
| 7 | 6 | DF | (Spain) | Marc Valiente | 0 | 1 | 0 | 1 |
| 7 | 16 | MF | (Serbia) | Saša Zdjelar | 1 | 0 | 0 | 1 |
| 7 | 19 | MF | (Montenegro) | Aleksandar Šćekić | 1 | 0 | 0 | 1 |
| 7 | 23 | DF | (Serbia) | Bojan Ostojić | 0 | 1 | 0 | 1 |
| 7 | — | — | | Own goal | 0 | 0 | 1 | 1 |
| Totals | | | | | 58 | 11 | 14 | 83 |

Last updated: 23 May 2019

=== Clean sheets ===
| Rank | No. | Pos | Nat | Name | SuperLiga | Serbian Cup | Europe | Total |
|---|---|---|---|---|---|---|---|---|
| 1 | 88 | GK | (Serbia) | Vladimir Stojković | 12 | 4 | 2 | 18 |
| 2 | 12 | GK | (Serbia) | Filip Kljajić | 6 | 0 | 1 | 7 |
| Totals | | | | | 18 | 4 | 3 | 25 |

Last updated: 23 May 2019

=== Disciplinary record ===
| Number | Nation | Position | Name | SuperLiga | | Serbian Cup | | Europe | | Total | |
| Number | Nation | Position | Name | Booked | Sent off (straight red) | Booked | Sent off (straight red) | Booked | Sent off (straight red) | Booked | Sent off (straight red) |
| 3 | (Serbia) | DF | Strahinja Pavlović | 6 | 1 | 1 | 0 | 0 | 0 | 7 | 1 |
| 4 | (Serbia) | DF | Miroslav Vulićević | 2 | 0 | 0 | 0 | 0 | 0 | 2 | 0 |
| 6 | (Spain) | DF | Marc Valiente | 6 | 0 | 0 | 0 | 1 | 0 | 7 | 0 |
| 8 | (Serbia) | MF | Armin Đerlek | 5 | 1 | 1 | 0 | 1 | 0 | 7 | 1 |
| 9 | (Serbia) | FW | Nemanja Nikolić | 4 | 0 | 0 | 0 | 2 | 0 | 6 | 0 |
| 10 | (Montenegro) | MF | Marko Janković* | 4 | 0 | 0 | 0 | 2 | 0 | 6 | 0 |
| 10 | (Serbia) | MF | Lazar Pavlović | 0 | 0 | 1 | 0 | 0 | 0 | 1 | 0 |
| 11 | (Cape Verde) | FW | Ricardo Gomes | 2 | 0 | 0 | 0 | 2 | 0 | 4 | 0 |
| 15 | (Serbia) | DF | Svetozar Marković | 4 | 0 | 0 | 0 | 0 | 0 | 4 | 0 |
| 16 | (Serbia) | MF | Saša Zdjelar | 6 | 0 | 1 | 0 | 2 | 0 | 9 | 0 |
| 17 | (Serbia) | DF | Zlatan Šehović | 1 | 0 | 0 | 0 | 0 | 0 | 1 | 0 |
| 18 | (Serbia) | MF | Đorđe Ivanović | 1 | 0 | 0 | 0 | 2 | 0 | 3 | 0 |
| 19 | (Montenegro) | MF | Aleksandar Šćekić | 4 | 0 | 1 | 0 | 0 | 0 | 5 | 0 |
| 20 | (Guinea) | MF | Seydouba Soumah* | 1 | 0 | 0 | 0 | 2 | 1 | 3 | 1 |
| 22 | (Serbia) | MF | Saša Ilić | 0 | 0 | 1 | 0 | 0 | 0 | 1 | 0 |
| 26 | (Serbia) | DF | Nemanja G.Miletić | 4 | 0 | 0 | 0 | 3 | 0 | 7 | 0 |
| 27 | (Montenegro) | MF | Nebojša Kosović* | 2 | 0 | 0 | 0 | 3 | 0 | 5 | 0 |
| 44 | (Romania) | DF | Gabriel Enache* | 1 | 0 | 0 | 0 | 0 | 0 | 1 | 0 |
| 51 | (Serbia) | FW | Ognjen Ožegović* | 1 | 0 | 0 | 0 | 0 | 0 | 1 | 0 |
| 55 | (Serbia) | MF | Danilo Pantić | 6 | 0 | 1 | 0 | 0 | 0 | 7 | 0 |
| 72 | (Serbia) | DF | Slobodan Urošević | 8 | 2 | 0 | 0 | 0 | 0 | 9 | 2 |
| 73 | (Serbia) | DF | Nemanja R.Miletić | 5 | 1 | 1 | 0 | 1 | 0 | 7 | 1 |
| 77 | (Bosnia and Herzegovina) | MF | Goran Zakarić | 6 | 0 | 0 | 0 | 1 | 0 | 7 | 0 |
| 80 | (Serbia) | MF | Filip Stevanović | 1 | 0 | 0 | 0 | 0 | 0 | 1 | 0 |
| 88 | (Serbia) | GK | Vladimir Stojković | 5 | 0 | 0 | 0 | 0 | 0 | 5 | 0 |
| 99 | (Serbia) | MF | Milan Smiljanić | 1 | 0 | 0 | 0 | 0 | 0 | 1 | 0 |
| | | | TOTALS | 86 | 5 | 8 | 0 | 22 | 1 | 117 | 6 |

Last updated: 23 May 2019

=== Game as captain ===
| Rank | No. | Pos | Nat | Name | SuperLiga | Serbian Cup | Europe | Total |
|---|---|---|---|---|---|---|---|---|
| 1 | 88 | GK | (Serbia) | Vladimir Stojković | 28 | 5 | 7 | 40 |
| 2 | 55 | MF | (Serbia) | Danilo Pantić | 4 | 0 | 1 | 5 |
| 3 | 4 | DF | (Serbia) | Miroslav Vulićević | 2 | 0 | 0 | 2 |
| 3 | 22 | MF | (Serbia) | Saša Ilić | 1 | 1 | 0 | 2 |
| 4 | 16 | MF | (Serbia) | Saša Zdjelar | 1 | 0 | 0 | 1 |
| 4 | 99 | MF | (Serbia) | Milan Smiljanić | 1 | 0 | 0 | 1 |
| Totals | | | | | 37 | 6 | 8 | 51 |

Last updated: 23 May 2019

* Players sold or loaned out during the season
