= List of Chester F.C. players =

Chester Football Club is an association football club based in Chester, England. They are currently members of the National League North, the sixth tier of English football, and play at the Deva Stadium.

The club was founded in 2010 following the liquidation of Chester City. In its inaugural season it won the Division One North of the Northern Premier League, then won the Northern League Premier Division in 2011–12 and the Conference North in 2012–13. Chester returned to the National League North following relegation in 2017–18.

The club's first team have competed in numerous competitions, and all players who have played in 100 or more first-team matches, either as a member of the starting eleven or as a substitute, are listed below. Each player's details include the duration of his Chester career, his typical playing position while with the club, and the number of matches played and goals scored in domestic league matches and in all senior competitive matches.

== Key ==
- The list is ordered first by number of appearances in total, then by number of league appearances, and then if necessary by date of debut.
- Statistics are correct up to and including the match played on 29 April 2026, the final match of Chester's 2025–26 season. Where a player left the club permanently after this date, his statistics are updated to his date of leaving.
- Players shown in bold are currently registered for the club.
- League appearances and goals comprise those in the Northern Premier League and the Football Conference/National League, excluding play-off games.
- Other appearances and goals comprise those in the FA Cup, FA Trophy, Cheshire Senior Cup, Northern Premier League League Cup and the league play-off games.

== Players with 100 or more appearances ==
Statistics are correct up to the end of the 2025-26 season. Please do not update current players stats until the seasons ends or player leaves the club.

№	Name	Nat.	Pos	Date of birth	Joined		Left		League appearances				Other appearances				Total appearances				Notes	Refs
№	Name	Nat.	Pos	Date of birth	Date	From	Date	To	Starts	Subs	Total	Goals	Starts	Subs	Total	Goals	Starts	Subs	Total	Goals	Notes	Refs
1	**Declan Weeks**	(Wales)	MF	1995-11-15	2020-09-29	Kidderminster Harriers			211	13	224	31	33	3	36	—	244	16	260	31		
2	Craig Mahon	(Republic of Ireland)	MF	1989-06-21	2013-05-29	Vauxhall Motors	2020-01-24	Altrincham	156	59	215	16	19	5	24	2	175	64	239	18		
3	Kevin Roberts	(England)	DF	1989-08-17	2019-05-24	Wrexham	2026-03-07	retired	184	18	202	8	32	5	37	1	216	23	239	9		
4	Anthony Dudley	(England)	FW	1996-09-15	2018-07-26	Salford City	2023-05-26	Radcliffe	105	36	141	32	21	8	29	3	126	44	170	35	on loan till 2019-06-14	
5	Iwan Murray	(Wales)	MF	2000-08-08	2018-07-01	youth team	2020-06-15	Runcorn Linnets	105	43	148	8	16	4	20	5	121	47	168	13		
5	Iwan Murray	(Wales)	MF	2000-08-08	2022-06-25	Runcorn Linnets	2026-05-29	Connah's Quay Nomads	105	43	148	8	16	4	20	5	121	47	168	13		
6	George Horan	(England)	DF	1982-02-18	2010-07-09	Droylsden	2014-06-13	Connah's Quay Nomads	138	—	138	18	19	2	21	2	157	2	159	20		
7	Harrison Burke	(England)	MF	2002-09-13	2019-07-01	youth team	2025-06-12	Walsall	119	11	130	19	21	3	24	5	140	14	154	24		
8	**Tom Peers**	(England)	FW	1995-10-23	2012-07-01	youth team	2016-03-14	Hednesford Town	86	41	127	31	15	9	24	5	101	50	151	36		
8	**Tom Peers**	(England)	FW	1995-10-23	2023-10-20	Macclesfield			86	41	127	31	15	9	24	5	101	50	151	36		
9	George Glendon	(England)	MF	1995-05-03	2019-08-30	Carlisle United	2025-01-24	Radcliffe	110	15	125	22	24	1	25	2	134	16	150	24		
10	Simon Grand	(England)	DF	1984-02-23	2018-07-20	AFC Fylde	2022-05-20	Charnock Richard	115	6	121	9	19	—	19	—	134	6	140	9		
11	Matty Williams	(England)	DF	2000-09-17	2021-06-23	Accrington Stanley	2025-05-25	Southport	109	6	115	7	13	2	15	1	122	8	130	8		
12	John Rooney	(England)	MF	1990-12-17	2013-11-28	Bury	2016-06-07	Wrexham	104	8	112	26	14	2	16	3	118	10	128	29	on loan till 2014-01-13	
13	John Danby	(England)	GK	1983-09-20	2011-06-09	Eastwood Town	2014-08-20	Bradford (Park Avenue)	99	1	100	—	15	—	15	—	114	1	115	—		
14	Iain Howard	(England)	FW	1987-11-27	2010-06-19	Ashton United	2013-05-17	Stockport County	64	31	95	27	12	7	19	8	76	38	114	35		
15	Ryan Astles	(England)	DF	1994-07-01	2016-01-08	Northwich Victoria	2018-05-10	Southport	102	1	103	7	10	—	10	—	112	1	113	7		
16	**Nathan Woodthorpe**	(England)	DF	2001-12-06	2023-07-11	Crewe Alexandra			89	10	99	1	11	—	11	—	100	10	110	1		
17	Danny Livesey	(England)	DF	1984-12-31	2018-07-27	Salford City	2022-05-01	retired	82	4	86	11	18	3	21	2	100	7	107	13	on loan till 2019-05-16	
18	Tom Shaw	(England)	MF	1986-12-01	2015-06-02	Alfreton Town	2018-01-21	Tamworth	84	13	97	12	7	1	8	—	91	14	105	12		
