= Filip Stevanović =

Serbian association footballer

Personal information
- Date of birth: 25 September 2002 (age 24)
- Place of birth: Arilje, FR Yugoslavia
- Height: 1.76 m (5 ft 9 in)
- Position: Left winger

Youth career
- Vranić Arilje
- 2011–2018: Partizan
- 2021–2024: Manchester City

Senior career*
Years	Team	Apps	(Gls)
2018–2021	Partizan	56	(11)
2021–2024	Manchester City	0	(0)
2021–2022	→ Heerenveen (loan)	21	(1)
2022–2023	→ Santa Clara (loan)	7	(0)
2023–2024	→ RKC (loan)	16	(2)
2024–2026	Lommel	11	(1)

International career^{‡}
2019	Serbia U19 (Note: Only official UEFA matches included)	3	(0)
2020–2021	Serbia U21	7	(0)
- * Club domestic league appearances and goals as of 20 April 2026 ‡ National team caps and goals as of 16 November 2021

Filip Stevanović (Serbian Cyrillic: Филип Стевановић; born 25 September 2002) is a Serbian professional footballer who plays as a left winger.

== Club career ==
Born in Arilje, he made his first footballing steps at local club Vranić. He later joined the youth system of Partizan after being scouted by Dušan Trbojević.

On 9 December 2018, Stevanović made his official senior debut for Partizan in a 3–0 away league victory over Rad, coming on as an 82nd-minute substitute for Đorđe Ivanović. He made three more league appearances through the remainder of the season.

On 1 August 2019, Stevanović scored his first goal for Partizan after coming off the bench in the return leg of the 2019–20 UEFA Europa League second qualifying round, a 3–0 home win versus Welsh side Connah's Quay Nomads. He thus became their youngest ever scorer in UEFA competitions and the second youngest in club history, at 16 years and 311 days old. Three days later, Stevanović netted his first league goal for Partizan, opening the scoring in an eventual 4–0 home victory over Mačva Šabac. He subsequently contributed with a brace in a 3–0 home win versus Rad on 18 August.

In October 2020, it was announced that Stevanović had agreed to join Manchester City in the following January.

On 8 August 2023, Stevanović returned to the Netherlands and joined RKC Waalwijk on a season-long loan. On 24 September Stevanović scored the winning goal in a 1–0 win over FC Twente.

== International career ==
Stevanović made his debut for the Serbia national under-19 football team in the 2020 UEFA European Under-19 Championship qualification.

== Career statistics ==
As of match played 11 March 2024

Appearances and goals by club, season and competition
Club	Season	League			Cup		League cup		Continental		Other		Total	
Club	Season	Division	Apps	Goals	Apps	Goals	Apps	Goals	Apps	Goals	Apps	Goals	Apps	Goals
Partizan	2018–19	Serbian SuperLiga	4	0	0	0	—		0	0	—		4	0
Partizan	2019–20	Serbian SuperLiga	25	7	3	1	—		7 (Note: Appearances in UEFA Europa League)	1	—		35	9
Partizan	2020–21	Serbian SuperLiga	27	4	3	0	—		3	0	—		33	4
Partizan	Total		56	11	6	1	—		10	1	—		72	13
Manchester City U23	2020–21	—			—		—		—		0	0	0	0
Manchester City U23	2021–22	—			—		—		—		0	0	0	0
Manchester City U23	Total		—		—		—		—		0	0	0	0
SC Heerenveen (loan)	2021–22	Eredivisie	21	1	3	1	—		0	0	—		24	2
Santa Clara (loan)	2022–23	Primeira Liga	7	0	1	0	1	0	—		—		9	0
RKC (loan)	2023–24	Eredivisie	16	2	1	0	—		—		—		17	2
Career total			100	14	11	2	1	0	10	1	0	0	122	17
