= Strahinja Pavlović =

Serbian footballer (born 2001)

Strahinja Pavlović Страхиња Павловић
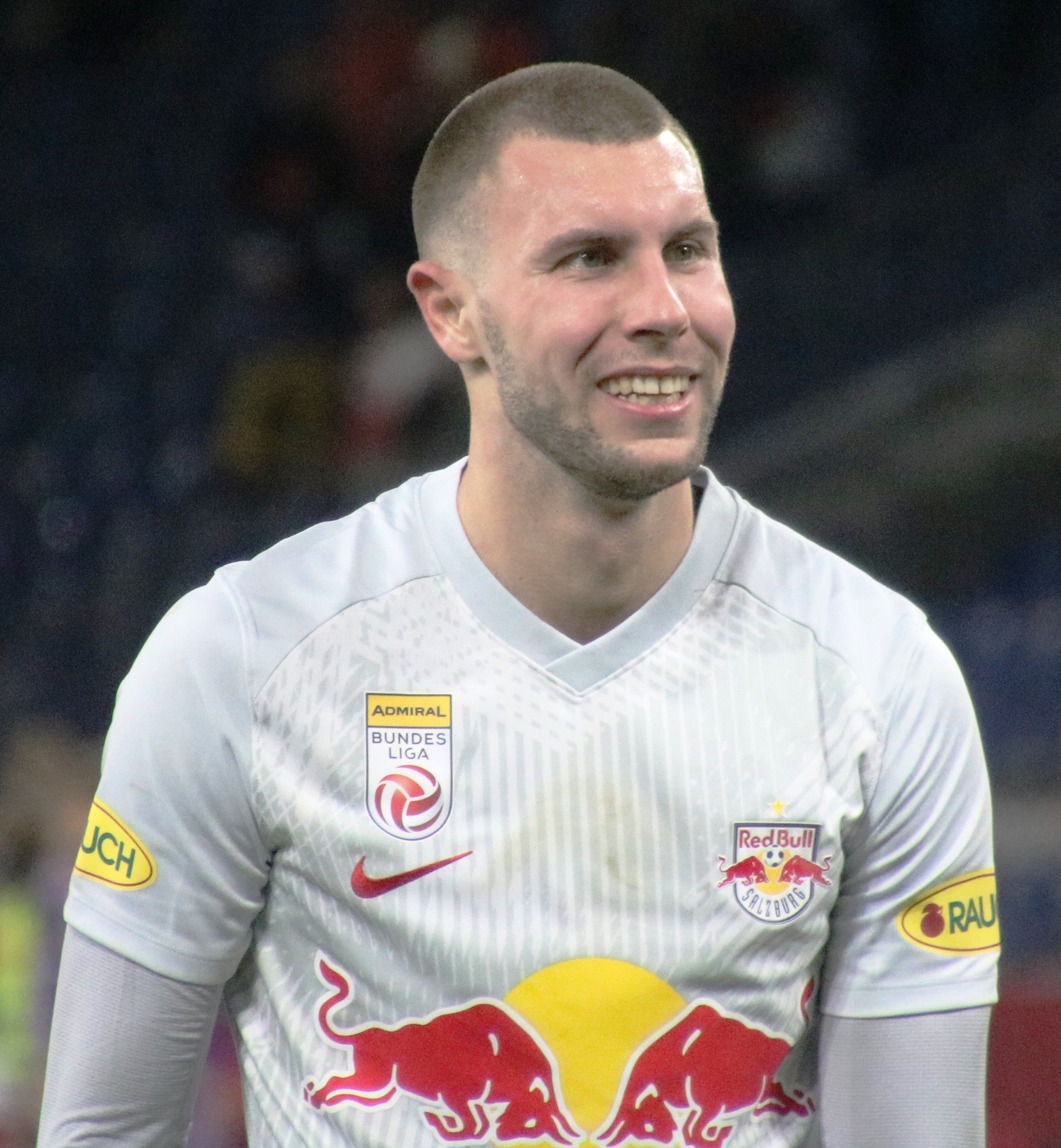
- Pavlović with Red Bull Salzburg in 2024

Personal information
- Full name: Strahinja Pavlović
- Date of birth: 24 May 2001 (age 25)
- Place of birth: Šabac, Serbia, FR Yugoslavia
- Height: 1.94 m (6 ft 4 in)
- Position: Centre-back

Team information
- Current team: AC Milan
- Number: 31

Youth career
- 2009–2015: Savacium Šabac
- 2015–2019: Partizan
- 2016–2017: → Teleoptik (loan)

Senior career*
Years	Team	Apps	(Gls)
2019–2020	Partizan	37	(1)
2020–2022	Monaco	8	(0)
2021	→ Cercle Brugge (loan)	11	(1)
2022	→ Basel (loan)	10	(0)
2022–2024	Red Bull Salzburg	50	(4)
2024–	AC Milan	69	(7)

International career^{‡}
2017	Serbia U17	2	(0)
2018–2019	Serbia U19	5	(0)
2019	Serbia U21	4	(0)
2020–	Serbia	59	(5)
- * Club domestic league appearances and goals as of 23:29, 22 November 2026 (UTC) ‡ National team caps and goals as of 4 October 2026

Strahinja Pavlović (Serbian Cyrillic: Страхиња Павловић; born 24 May 2001) is a Serbian professional footballer who plays as a centre-back for Serie A club AC Milan and the Serbia national team.

== Club career ==
=== Partizan ===
==== 2015–2018: Youth years ====
Born in Šabac, Pavlović started out at local club Savacium. He officially joined the youth system of Partizan in the summer of 2015. In September 2018, Pavlović signed his first professional contract with the club, agreeing to a three-year deal. He was promoted to the first team by manager Zoran Mirković ahead of winter preparations for the second half of the season.

==== 2018–19: First-team breakthrough ====
On 23 February 2019, Pavlović made his competitive senior debut for the club in a 3–0 home league win over Proleter Novi Sad, playing the full 90 minutes and receiving a yellow card in the process. A week later, on 2 March of the same year, Pavlović played his first Eternal derby, and at the time of the match his age was 17 years and 282 days. As in the match of the previous round, Pavlović received a yellow card in that meeting as well. He quickly established himself in the team's starting lineup, collecting 15 official appearances and helping Partizan win the 2018–19 Serbian Cup.

==== 2019–20: New contract and first goal ====
At the beginning of the 2019–20 season, Pavlović confirmed himself as a first-team regular, forming a central defensive partnership with the experienced Bojan Ostojić. He was reportedly close to signing with Italian club Lazio near the end of the summer transfer window. However, the negotiations failed and Pavlović signed a new five-year contract with Partizan. He scored his first career goal in a controversial 2–1 home league loss to Voždovac on 6 October.

=== Monaco ===
==== 2019–20: Transfer and Partizan loan ====
On 18 December 2019, it was officially announced that Partizan and Monaco had agreed terms for the transfer of Pavlović over the forthcoming winter transfer window. Pavlović would remain on loan with Partizan until June 2020.

==== 2020–21: Loan to Cercle Brugge ====
Pavlović's debut for Monaco came on 20 December 2020, as he came on as a late-match substitute in a 1–0 away victory over Dijon. On 21 January 2021, he joined Cercle Brugge on loan until the end of the season, having seen limited game time at Monaco due to being the fifth-choice centre-back in Niko Kovač's team.

==== 2021–22: Loan to Basel ====
After making 11 appearances for Monaco in all competitions in the first half of the 2021–22 season, on 16 February 2022 Pavlović was loaned to Basel in Switzerland until the end of the season. Pavlović joined Basel's first team for their 2021–22 season under head coach Patrick Rahmen. He played his domestic league debut for the club in the home game in the St. Jakob-Park on 19 February 2022 as Basel won 3–0 against Lausanne-Sport. During his short loan period with the club, Pavlović played a total of 11 games for Basel without scoring a goal. 10 of these games were in the Nationalliga A and the other was a friendly game.

=== Red Bull Salzburg ===
On 1 July 2022, Austrian Bundesliga club Red Bull Salzburg completed the transfer of Strahinja Pavlović from Monaco for €7.00m. Pavlović made his debut on 15 July in the first round of the 2022–23 Austrian Cup, playing all 90 minutes in a 0–3 win against Fuegen.

=== AC Milan ===
On 31 July 2024, Pavlović joined Serie A club AC Milan for an estimated €18 million fee, on a contract until 30 June 2028. He chose 31 as his jersey number, which had once belonged to former Milan defender Jaap Stam, to whom he immediately drew comparisons due to similarities in physique and appearance. Pavlović made his debut on 24 August 2024 in the Rossoneri's 2–1 loss against Parma. He scored his first goal for the club on 31 August in a 2–2 draw against Lazio.

On 2 November 2025 in a 1–0 win against Roma Pavlović scored the only goal of the match in the 39th minute off a stellar run from Rafael Leão to seal the deal for the Rossoneri.

== International career ==
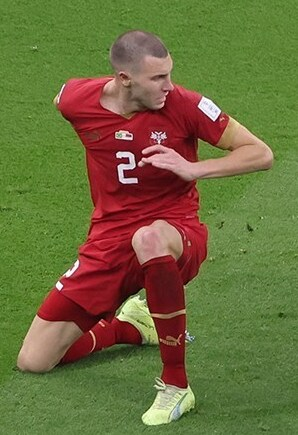
Pavlović playing for Serbia at the 2022 FIFA World Cup

=== Youth career ===
Pavlović was capped for Serbia at under-17 and under-19 levels. He made his national under-21 team debut on 6 September 2019, playing the full 90 minutes in a 1–0 away loss against Russia in their 2021 UEFA European Under-21 Championship qualifier.

=== Senior career ===
On 3 September 2020, Pavlović debuted for the Serbian senior squad in a 2020–21 UEFA Nations League match against Russia.

In November 2022, Pavlović was selected in Serbia's squad for the 2022 FIFA World Cup. He played in all three group stage matches, against Brazil, Cameroon, and Switzerland. He scored a header goal in a group stage match against Cameroon, on assist from Dušan Tadić. Serbia finished fourth in the group.

Pavlović was selected in Serbia's squad for the UEFA Euro 2024, playing in all three group stage matches. Serbia finished fourth in the group and did not advance to the knockout stage.

== Career statistics ==
=== Club ===
As of match played 22 November 2026

Appearances and goals by club, season and competition
Club	Season	League			National cup (Note: Includes Serbian Cup, Coupe de France, Belgian Cup, Austrian Cup, Coppa Italia)		Continental		Other		Total	
Club	Season	Division	Apps	Goals	Apps	Goals	Apps	Goals	Apps	Goals	Apps	Goals
Partizan	2018–19	Serbian SuperLiga	11	0	4	0	0	0	—		15	0
Partizan	2019–20 (Note: Pavlović spent half of the 2019–20 season on loan from Monaco)	Serbian SuperLiga	26	1	4	1	12 (Note: Appearances in the UEFA Europa League)	0	—		42	2
Partizan	Total		37	1	8	1	12	0	—		57	2
Monaco	2020–21	Ligue 1	1	0	0	0	0	0	—		1	0
Monaco	2021–22	Ligue 1	7	0	1	0	3	0	—		11	0
Monaco	Total		8	0	1	0	3	0	—		12	0
Cercle Brugge (loan)	2020–21	Belgian Pro League	11	1	1	0	—		—		12	1
Basel (loan)	2021–22	Swiss Super League	10	0	0	0	—		—		10	0
Red Bull Salzburg	2022–23	Austrian Bundesliga	24	1	3	1	7 (Note: Six appearances in UEFA Europa League, one appearance in UEFA Champions League)	0	—		34	2
Red Bull Salzburg	2023–24	Austrian Bundesliga	26	3	5	1	6 (Note: Appearances in UEFA Champions League)	0	—		37	4
Red Bull Salzburg	Total		50	4	8	2	13	0	—		71	6
AC Milan	2024–25	Serie A	24	2	4	0	7	0	0	0	35	2
AC Milan	2025–26	Serie A	34	5	3	0	—		1 (Note: Appearance in Supercoppa Italiana)	0	38	5
AC Milan	2026–27	Serie A	11	0	0	0	3	0	—		14	0
AC Milan	Total		69	7	7	0	10	0	1	0	87	7
Career total			185	13	25	3	38	0	1	0	249	16

=== International ===
As of match played 4 October 2026

Appearances and goals by national team and year
National team	Year	Apps	Goals
Serbia	2020	4	0
Serbia	2021	11	1
Serbia	2022	10	1
Serbia	2023	7	1
Serbia	2024	11	1
Serbia	2025	9	0
Serbia	2026	7	1
Total		59	5

Scores and results list Serbia's goal tally first, score column indicates score after each Pavlović goal.

List of international goals scored by Strahinja Pavlović
No.	Date	Venue	Cap	Opponent	Score	Result	Competition
1	7 June 2021	Miki Athletic Stadium, Miki, Japan	8	Jamaica	1–1	1–1	Friendly
2	28 November 2022	Al Janoub Stadium, Al-Wakrah, Qatar	24	Cameroon	1–1	3–3	2022 FIFA World Cup
3	14 October 2023	Puskás Aréna, Budapest, Hungary	30	Hungary	1–1	1–2	UEFA Euro 2024 qualifying
4	4 June 2024	Ernst-Happel-Stadion, Vienna, Austria	34	Austria	2–1	2–1	Friendly
5	31 March 2026	TSC Arena, Bačka Topola, Serbia	54	Saudi Arabia	1–1	2–1	Friendly

== Honours ==
Partizan

- Serbian Cup: 2018–19

Red Bull Salzburg

- Austrian Bundesliga: 2022–23

AC Milan

- Supercoppa Italiana: 2024–25
