= Marc Valiente =

Spanish association footballer (born 1967)

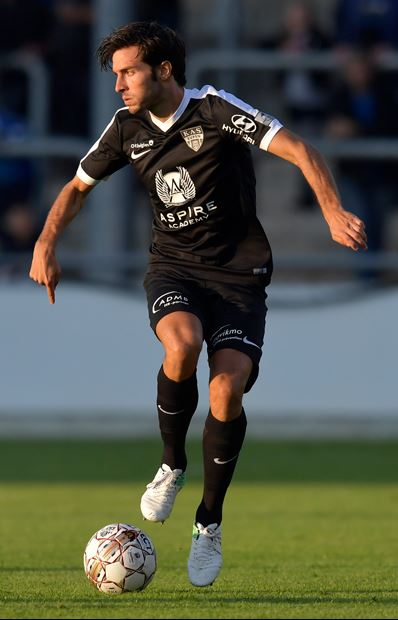
- Valiente with Eupen in 2017

Personal information
- Full name: Marc Valiente Hernández
- Date of birth: 29 March 1987 (age 39)
- Place of birth: Granollers, Spain
- Height: 1.87 m (6 ft 1 1/2 in)
- Position: Centre-back

Youth career
- 1997–2005: Barcelona

Senior career*
Years	Team	Apps	(Gls)
2005	Barcelona C	9	(0)
2005–2008	Barcelona B	86	(4)
2006–2008	Barcelona	0	(0)
2008–2010	Sevilla B	58	(1)
2009–2010	Sevilla	3	(0)
2010–2015	Valladolid	145	(5)
2015–2017	Maccabi Haifa	49	(1)
2017–2018	Eupen	24	(1)
2018–2019	Partizan	31	(0)
2019–2022	Sporting Gijón	55	(2)
2022–2023	Goa	8	(0)
Total		468	(14)

International career
2006	Spain U19	8	(1)
2007	Spain U20	5	(0)
2013	Catalonia	1	(0)
- * Club domestic league appearances and goals

Marc Valiente Hernández (born 29 March 1987) is a Spanish former professional footballer who played as a centre-back.

He was formed at Barcelona and later joined Sevilla, but was mainly a reserve at both clubs. In 2010 he signed with Valladolid, where he appeared in 157 official games over a five-year span. He went on to play top-flight football in Israel, Belgium, Serbia and India.

Valiente was a Spanish youth international, and played one unofficial match for Catalonia in 2013.

== Club career ==
Born in Granollers, Barcelona, Catalonia, Valiente started his career at FC Barcelona aged 10, being club captain for most of its youth sides and playing alongside Cesc Fàbregas, Lionel Messi, Gerard Piqué and Víctor Vázquez. He made his debut for the first team against CF Badalona in a Copa del Rey second-leg match, coming on as a substitute for Juliano Belletti at half time of the 4–0 home win.

In July 2008, after some turbulence regarding his future, Valiente moved to Sevilla FC after being released by the Blaugrana. He spent his first professional season with the Andalusians' reserves, starting most of the year in a relegation from the Segunda División.

On 21 November 2009, injuries to the first squad, mostly Federico Fazio, granted Valiente his first La Liga opportunity, as he started in the 2–1 away win against CD Tenerife. He appeared in two more games during the campaign – replacing injured Adriano before the 30-minute mark of the 1–0 win at Sporting de Gijón, and playing the first half away to eventual champions Barcelona (0–0 at halftime, 4–0 defeat)– being released by Sevilla in June 2010 and signing for three years with Real Valladolid, recently relegated to the second division.

Valiente scored his first goal as a professional on 19 September 2010, but in a 2–1 away loss to Real Betis. He contributed 33 games, nearly 3,000 minutes of action and one goal in his second year, as the Castile and León side returned to the top flight after a two-year absence.

On 2 July 2015, Valiente moved abroad for the first time, signing a three-year deal with Israel's Maccabi Haifa F.C. for an annual wage of €350,000. Valladolid received €250,000 from his sale. He was one of a contingent of Spanish players in the relatively obscure Israeli Premier League, receiving media attention back home.

After two seasons in the Middle East, Valiente moved countries again, joining K.A.S. Eupen in July 2017. He scored his first goal for his new club on 4 November, an added-time equaliser in a 4–4 Belgian Pro League draw at Sint-Truidense VV.

Valiente moved to the Serbian SuperLiga on 26 June 2018, after agreeing to a two-year deal at FK Partizan. He joined the squad the next day, being given the number 6 jersey and in the process becoming the first Spaniard in their history.

On 25 July 2019, Valiente returned to Spain by signing a two-year contract with Sporting de Gijón of the second tier. Days after its expiration, it was renewed for another year.

In June 2022, aged 35, Valiente moved to the Indian Super League with FC Goa, managed by his compatriot Carlos Peña. He ended his professional career in May 2023, joining Kings League team El Barrio shortly after.

== International career ==
Valiente was a Spanish international at under-19 and under-20 levels. On 30 December 2013 he earned his first and only cap for the Catalonia regional team, starting in the 4–1 defeat of Cape Verde held at the Estadi Olímpic Lluís Companys.

== Career statistics ==
Appearances and goals by club, season and competition
Club	Season	League			National cup		League cup		Continental		Other		Total	
Club	Season	Division	Apps	Goals	Apps	Goals	Apps	Goals	Apps	Goals	Apps	Goals	Apps	Goals
Barcelona C	2005–06	Tercera División	9	0	—		—		—		—		9	0
Barcelona B	2005–06	Segunda División B	27	2	—		—		—		—		27	2
Barcelona B	2006–07	Segunda División B	30	2	—		—		—		—		30	2
Barcelona B	2007–08	Tercera División	29	0	—		—		—		—		29	0
Barcelona B	Total		86	4	—		—		—		—		86	4
Barcelona	2006–07	La Liga	0	0	1	0	—		0	0	0	0	1	0
Barcelona	2007–08	La Liga	0	0	1	0	—		0	0	—		1	0
Barcelona	Total		0	0	2	0	—		0	0	0	0	2	0
Sevilla B	2008–09	Segunda División	33	0	—		—		—		—		33	0
Sevilla B	2009–10	Segunda División B	25	1	—		—		—		—		25	1
Sevilla B	Total		58	1	—		—		—		—		58	1
Sevilla	2009–10	La Liga	3	0	2	0	—		0	0	—		5	0
Valladolid	2010–11	Segunda División	24	2	1	0	—		—		2 (Note: Appearances in La Liga play-offs)	0	27	2
Valladolid	2011–12	Segunda División	33	1	0	0	—		—		4	0	37	1
Valladolid	2012–13	La Liga	28	0	2	0	—		—		—		30	0
Valladolid	2013–14	La Liga	29	1	1	0	—		—		—		30	1
Valladolid	2014–15	Segunda División	31	1	2	0	—		—		—		33	1
Valladolid	Total		145	5	6	0	—		—		6	0	157	5
Maccabi Haifa	2015–16	Israeli Premier League	30	1	4	0	1	0	—		—		35	1
Maccabi Haifa	2016–17	Israeli Premier League	19	0	1	0	2	0	2	0	1 (Note: Appearance in Israel Super Cup)	0	25	0
Maccabi Haifa	Total		49	1	5	0	3	0	2	0	1	0	60	1
Eupen	2017–18	Belgian Pro League	24	1	2	0	—		—		7 (Note: Appearances in Belgian Pro League Europa League play-offs)	0	33	1
Partizan	2018–19	Serbian SuperLiga	31	0	2	1	—		8	0	—		41	1
Sporting Gijón	2019–20	Segunda División	22	1	0	0	—		—		—		22	1
Sporting Gijón	2020–21	Segunda División	17	0	3	0	—		—		—		20	0
Sporting Gijón	2021–22	Segunda División	16	1	1	0	—		—		—		17	1
Sporting Gijón	Total		55	2	4	0	—		—		—		59	2
Goa	2022–23	Indian Super League	8	0	—		—		—		—		8	0
Career total			468	14	23	0	3	0	10	0	14	0	518	14

== Honours ==
Sevilla

- Copa del Rey: 2009–10

Maccabi Haifa

- Israel State Cup: 2015–16

Partizan

- Serbian Cup: 2018–19

Spain U19

- UEFA European Under-19 Championship: 2006
