= Armin Đerlek =

Serbian footballer

Personal information
- Date of birth: 15 July 2000 (age 26)
- Place of birth: Novi Pazar, FR Yugoslavia
- Height: 1.73 m (5 ft 8 in)
- Position: Attacking midfielder

Team information
- Current team: IF Karlstad Fotboll
- Number: 28

Youth career
- 2007–2011: AS Novi Pazar
- 2011–2015: Pazar Juniors
- 2015–2017: OFK Beograd
- 2017–2018: Partizan

Senior career*
Years	Team	Apps	(Gls)
2018–2019	Partizan	22	(0)
2019–2023	Sivasspor	9	(0)
2021–2022	→ Aluminij (loan)	25	(5)
2024–2025	Trenčín	21	(0)
2025–2026	Novi Pazar	0	(0)
2026–	IF Karlstad Fotboll	16	(1)

International career^{‡}
2014–2015	Serbia U15	6	(2)
2015–2016	Serbia U16	7	(5)
2015–2017	Serbia U17	29	(9)
2017	Serbia U18	2	(0)
2021	Serbia U21	7	(0)
- * Club domestic league appearances and goals as of 16 November 2026 ‡ National team caps and goals as of 16 November 2021

Armin Đerlek (Serbian Cyrillic: Армин Ђерлек; born 15 July 2000) is a Serbian footballer who plays as an attacking midfielder for Swedish Ettan Norra club IF Karlstad Fotboll.

== Club career ==
=== Early years ===
Born in Novi Pazar, Đerlek started playing football with a local academy named "AS" at the age of 7. Four years later, he moved to Pazar Juniors. In an interview made in 2017, he remembered on 28 January 2011, when his grandfather took him to the first training. Playing for the club, he was affirmed as "the target man" in the academy since 2015 when he left the club as one of the top youth prospects in Serbia. He moved to OFK Beograd in summer 2015 at the age of 15, penning his first three-year professional contract with the club. He sued the club for unpaid wages and received a dispute over arbitration in March 2017, when he left OFK Beograd as a free agent. Later, same month, it was announced about his moving to Partizan. Previously, he had been marked as a pick of the greatest rival, Red Star Belgrade.

=== Partizan ===
On 28 April 2017, Đerlek signed a three-year contract with Partizan, when he was officially promoted by the club's director of football, Ivica Iliev. He passed summer pre-season with the first team, but failed to make any official appearances with the club for the rest of 2017. In February 2018, Đerlek joined the first squad under coach Miroslav Đukić, among a group of youth players who impressed during the winter-break, choosing to wear the number 44 jersey. He made his professional debut for Partizan in 23rd fixture match of the 2017–18 Serbian SuperLiga campaign, having played 67 minutes in 2–1 away victory over Mladost Lučani on 18 February 2018. Đerlek noted his first Eternal Derby on 14 April 2018, having played 57 minutes of the match. Đerlek was replaced by Zoran Tošić in second-half, while Partizan archived 2–1 defeat in the game. Đerlek won his first trophy with Partizan after 2–1 victory over Mladost Lučani in final match of the 2017–18 Serbian Cup on 23 May 2018. In summer 2018, after Gabriel Enache joined the club and took the number 44 shirt, Đerlek converted his squad number to 8, which previously had been worn by Vladimir Đilas. Đerlek played his first continental match for Partizan in 3–0 victory over Rudar Pljevlja on 19 July 2018.

=== Sivasspor ===
On 5 August 2019, Đerlek signed a five-year contract with Turkish Süper Lig club Sivasspor. He made his Süper Lig appearances during the 2019–20 season. After not making any appearances for Sivasspor in the 2022–23 season, Đerlek's contract was terminated by mutual consent.

=== Loan to Aluminij ===
During his time at Sivasspor, Đerlek was loaned to Slovenian PrvaLiga club NK Aluminij, where he made league appearances and scored goals across two seasons.

=== Trenčín ===
Đerlek subsequently joined Slovak Niké liga club AS Trenčín, where he made league appearances over two seasons.

=== Return to Novi Pazar ===
In 2025, Đerlek returned to his hometown club Novi Pazar in the Serbian SuperLiga.

=== IF Karlstad Fotboll ===
On 24 April 2026, Đerlek signed for Swedish Ettan Norra club IF Karlstad Fotboll after his work permit as a non-EU citizen had been processed. He had previously trialled with Swedish club Ljungskile SK during the winter break. Đerlek was assigned squad number 28.

== International career ==
In 2014, Đerlek was invited into Serbian under-15 national team under coach Marko Mitrović. He scored a goal in a debut match for the team against Montenegro on 9 December 2014. He also scored against the Netherlands on 11 February 2015. Đerlek continued playing with Serbian under-16 selection between 2015 and 2016, scoring in matches against Poland and Macedonia, and in a match against Montenegro on 10 June 2016, when he scored a hat trick. He also scored on his debut match for Serbian under-17 level against Hungary on 8 December 2015. He played performed as a captain until summer 2017, helping the team to qualify for the UEFA European Under-17 Championship in 2016 and 2017. In December 2017, Perica Ognjenović called Đerlek in Serbian under-18 national team for the tournament in Israel. He made his debut for the team as a captain in 1–0 defeat against home team on 11 December same year, and also played against Germany next day. Đerlek later represented the Serbia national under-21 football team in UEFA Under-21 Championship qualifying matches.

== Playing style ==
"Đerlek is ambitious, impeccably disciplined, in the right sense of the word is a professional. There are almost everything that a modern football player needs. He can operate at the whole places in the middle of the court, being available to play as a central and defensive midfielder, as well as a playmaker. If it is played in rhombus, he can be used both left and high. If Armin is mentored, especially in a period in which he is, then he can expect a great career."

— Adem Preljević, founder of "AS" football academy, February 2018

Standing at 5-foot-8-inches (1.73 m), Đerlek usually operates as an attacking midfielder. He can use both legs equally well, which allows him to create a position for a shot from multiple angles. He is characterised as a creative playmaker with strong pace, likewise good ball control and game vision. He is also described as classic number 10 in 4-2-3-1 formation, with leadership and captaincy roles. Due to his playing style, The Guardian compared him with Eden Hazard as also his compatriot Adem Ljajić.

== Career statistics ==
=== Club ===
As of 17 May 2026

Appearances and goals by club, season and competition
Club	Season	League			Cup		Continental		Other		Total	
Club	Season	Division	Apps	Goals	Apps	Goals	Apps	Goals	Apps	Goals	Apps	Goals
Partizan	2017–18	Serbian SuperLiga	10	0	4	0	—		—		14	0
Partizan	2018–19	Serbian SuperLiga	12	0	3	1	3	0	—		18	1
Partizan	Total		22	0	7	1	3	0	—		32	1
Sivasspor	2019–20	Süper Lig	9	0	0	0	0	0	—		9	0
Aluminij (loan)	2021–22	Slovenian PrvaLiga	25	5	1	0	—		—		26	5
Trenčín	2024–25	Niké liga	21	0	1	0	—		—		22	0
Novi Pazar	2025–26	Serbian SuperLiga	0	0	0	0	—		—		0	0
IF Karlstad Fotboll	2026	Ettan Norra	5	0	0	0	—		—		5	0
Career total			82	5	9	1	3	0	—		94	6

== Honours ==
Partizan

- Serbian Cup: 2017–18
