= Strahinja Bošnjak =

Serbian footballer (born 1999)

Personal information
- Date of birth: 18 February 1999 (age 27)
- Place of birth: Banja Luka, Bosnia and Herzegovina
- Height: 1.82 m (6 ft 0 in)
- Position: Centre-back

Team information
- Current team: Mash'al
- Number: 4

Youth career
- Čibukovac
- OFK Beograd
- Partizan

Senior career*
Years	Team	Apps	(Gls)
2015–2019	Partizan	0	(0)
2016	→ Teleoptik (loan)	3	(0)
2017	→ Teleoptik (loan)	10	(0)
2018	→ Zemun (loan)	7	(0)
2019–2020	Voždovac	11	(0)
2020–2021	Kolubara	22	(1)
2021–2022	Borac Banja Luka	17	(0)
2023	Krupa	15	(2)
2024	Mauerwerk	14	(1)
2024–2025	FBC Gravina	28	(0)
2025–2026	Dubočica	18	(0)
2026–	Mash'al	3	(1)

International career
2014–2015	Serbia U16		
2015–2016	Serbia U17	12	(1)
2015–2016	Serbia U18	3	(0)
2016–2018	Serbia U19 (Note: Only official UEFA matches included)	11	(0)
2018	Serbia U21	1	(0)
- * Club domestic league appearances and goals as of 29 July 2026

Strahinja Bošnjak (Serbian Cyrillic: Страхиња Бошњак; born 18 February 1999) is a Serbian professional footballer who plays as a defender for Uzbekistani club Mash'al.

== Club career ==
Born in Banja Luka, but spent his childhood in Kraljevo, he started out at local club Čibukovac. He also spent some time at OFK Beograd, before joining the youth system of Partizan. In the summer of 2015, Bošnjak was promoted to the first-team squad in preparations for the 2015–16 season. He was subsequently loaned to their affiliated side Teleoptik in early 2016.

In November 2016, Bošnjak signed his first professional contract with Partizan, on a three-year contract. He was again sent on loan to Teleoptik in the 2017 winter transfer window, helping them win the Serbian League Belgrade and promotion to the Serbian First League.

In July 2018, Bošnjak was loaned to Serbian SuperLiga club Zemun.

In the meantime, he played one season each in Voždovac and Kolubara before he returned to his hometown and signed for Borac Banja Luka in September 2021.

== International career ==
Bošnjak represented Serbia at the 2016 UEFA European Under-17 Championship. He made his debut for the under-21 team in a friendly against Qatar U23 in December 2017.

== Honours ==
Teleoptik

- Serbian League Belgrade: 2016–17

Partizan

- Serbian Cup: 2017–18
