= Gabriel Enache =

Romanian footballer (born 1990)

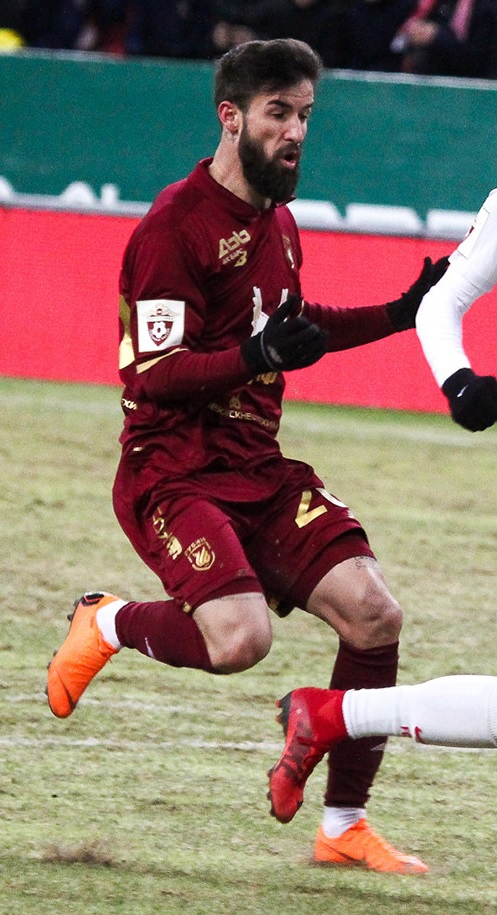
- Enache with Rubin Kazan in 2018

Personal information
- Full name: Gabriel Nicolae Enache
- Date of birth: 18 August 1990 (age 36)
- Place of birth: Mioveni, Romania
- Height: 1.74 m (5 ft 9 in)
- Positions: Right-back; right winger

Youth career
- 1997–2002: LPS Pitești
- 2002–2008: Dacia Mioveni

Senior career*
Years	Team	Apps	(Gls)
2008–2012	Mioveni	102	(12)
2012–2016	Astra Giurgiu	103	(10)
2016–2018	Steaua București	55	(4)
2018	Rubin Kazan	5	(0)
2018–2019	Partizan	8	(2)
2019	→ Dunărea Călărași (loan)	12	(0)
2019–2020	Astra Giurgiu	7	(1)
2020	Kyzylzhar	6	(2)
2020–2021	FCSB	1	(0)
2021	Zhetysu	19	(0)
2022–2023	FC U Craiova	8	(0)
Total		326	(31)

International career
2011–2012	Romania U21	8	(2)
2014–2016	Romania	5	(0)
- * Club domestic league appearances and goals

Gabriel Nicolae Enache (Romanian pronunciation: [gabriˈel nikoˈla.e eˈnake]; born 18 August 1990) is a Romanian former professional footballer who played as a right-back or a right winger.

== Club career ==
=== Mioveni ===
Enache scored his first Mioveni goal in a 1–1 second division draw with FCM Târgoviște on 23 August 2008.

On 22 July 2011, aged 20, he recorded his first Liga I appearance in a 0–1 loss to Universitatea Cluj.

=== Astra Giurgiu ===
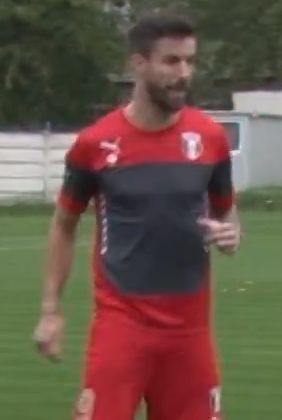
Enache training for Astra Giurgiu in 2015.

In the summer of 2012, Enache agreed to a four-year contract with the option of another year with Astra Ploiești, soon relocated and renamed Astra Giurgiu.

On 23 October 2014, Enache scored the last goal of a UEFA Europa League group stage away game with Celtic, which ended in a 2–1 victory for "the Bhoys".

He amassed Liga I totals of 102 matches and ten goals during his time at the club.

=== FCSB ===
On 22 February 2016, FCSB signed Enache on a five-year deal for an undisclosed transfer fee. He was handed the number 44 shirt and played eleven games in the remainder of the 2015–16 Liga I. He scored his first goal for the Roș-albaștrii in a 1–1 draw with Pandurii Târgu Jiu, on 1 May that year.

In his following season at the club, Enache netted three goals in 29 league matches.

On 24 February 2018, FCSB announced that his contract had been terminated on mutual agreement.

=== Rubin Kazan ===
On 28 February 2018, Enache signed a contract with Russian team Rubin Kazan. He made his competitive debut two days later, playing the full 90 minutes in a 1–1 league draw to Anzhi Makhachkala. His contract was not extended by Rubin as it expired at the end of the 2017–18 season.

=== Partizan ===
On 20 July 2018, it was announced Enache will join Partizan for the 2018–19 season. He made a deal with the club on same day, afternoon, choosing to wear number 44 shirt, which was assigned to Armin Đerlek in the past season. Enache made his debut for new club in starting line-up in the first leg match of the first qualifying round for 2018–19 UEFA Europa League campaign, against Rudar Pljevlja. On 7 September 2019, Enache left the club.

=== Return to Astra Giurgiu ===
On 19 September 2019, Enache signed a two-year contract with Liga I club Astra Giurgiu.

== International career ==
On 7 September 2014, Enache made his full debut for Romania in a 1–0 win against Greece counting for the UEFA Euro 2016 qualifiers, coming on as a substitute for Alexandru Maxim.

== Personal life ==
Enache wed his partner Mădălina in May 2014. She gave birth to a daughter, however the couple filed for divorce in 2017. Enache has since been in a relationship with a woman he met during the marriage.

Some of Enache's tattoos are a representation of his religious beliefs.

== Career statistics ==
=== Club ===
As of 15 October 2022

Appearances and goals by club, season and competition
Club	Season	League			National cup		League cup		Europe		Other		Total	
Club	Season	Division	Apps	Goals	Apps	Goals	Apps	Goals	Apps	Goals	Apps	Goals	Apps	Goals
Mioveni	2008–09	Liga II	33	6	0	0	—		—		—		33	6
Mioveni	2009–10	Liga II	19	5	0	0	—		—		—		19	5
Mioveni	2010–11	Liga II	18	1	0	0	—		—		—		18	1
Mioveni	2011–12	Liga I	32	0	1	0	—		—		—		33	0
Mioveni	Total		102	12	1	0	0	0	0	0	0	0	103	12
Astra Giurgiu	2012–13	Liga I	26	2	3	0	—		—		—		29	2
Astra Giurgiu	2013–14	Liga I	24	4	2	0	—		8	0	—		34	4
Astra Giurgiu	2014–15	Liga I	31	3	1	0	3	1	9	2	1	1	45	7
Astra Giurgiu	2015–16	Liga I	22	1	2	2	2	0	6	0	—		32	3
Astra Giurgiu	2019–20	Liga I	7	1	0	0	—		—		—		7	1
Astra Giurgiu	Total		110	11	8	2	5	1	23	2	1	1	147	17
FCSB	2015–16	Liga I	11	1	2	1	3	0	—		—		16	2
FCSB	2016–17	Liga I	29	3	2	0	2	0	7	0	—		40	3
FCSB	2017–18	Liga I	15	0	0	0	—		8	0	—		23	0
FCSB	2020–21	Liga I	1	0	0	0	—		1	0	—		2	0
FCSB	Total		56	4	4	1	5	0	16	0	0	0	81	5
Rubin Kazan	2017–18	Russian Premier League	5	0	–		—		—		—		5	0
Partizan	2018–19	Serbian SuperLiga	8	2	0	0	—		7	0	—		15	2
Dunarea Calarasi	2018–19	Liga I	12	0	0	0	—		—		—		12	0
Kyzylzhar	2020	Kazakhstan Premier League	6	2	0	0	—		—		—		6	2
Zhetysu	2021	Kazakhstan Premier League	19	0	6	0	—		—		—		25	0
FC U Craiova	2022–23	Liga I	8	0	1	0	—		—		—		12	0
Career total			326	31	20	3	10	1	46	2	1	1	403	38

=== International ===
As of 15 November 2016

Appearances and goals by national team and year
National team	Year	Apps	Goals
Romania	2014	3	0
Romania	2015	0	0
Romania	2016	2	0
Total		5	0

== Honours ==
=== Club ===
Astra Giurgiu

- Liga I: 2015–16
- Cupa României: 2013–14
- Supercupa României: 2014

Steaua București

- Cupa Ligii: 2015–16
