= George Horan =

English footballer (born 1982)

Personal information
- Date of birth: 18 February 1982 (age 44)
- Place of birth: Chester, England
- Position: Defender

Youth career
- -2001: Wrexham

Senior career*
Years	Team	Apps	(Gls)
2001-2005	Connah's Quay Nomads	26	(1)
2005–2010	Rhyl	30+	(9)
2010–2014	Chester	138	(18)
2014–2023	Connah's Quay Nomads	204	(26)
- * Club domestic league appearances and goals

George Horan (born 18 February 1982) is an English footballer who most recently played as a defender for Cymru Premier club Connah's Quay Nomads.

== Career ==
In 2005, Horan signed for Welsh side Rhyl, helping them win the league and 2005–06 Welsh Cup. In 2010, he signed for Chester in the English eighth tier, helping them earn three consecutive promotions to the English fifth tier. In June 2014, he signed for Welsh club Connah's Quay Nomads, helping them win the league, their first top flight title. On 7 July 2021, Horan scored for Connah's Quay Nomads during a 2–2 draw with Alashkert, becoming the oldest player ever to score a goal in the UEFA Champions League.

== Career statistics ==
Appearances and goals by club, season and competition
Club	Season	League			National Cup		League Cup		Other		Total	
Club	Season	Division	Apps	Goals	Apps	Goals	Apps	Goals	Apps	Goals	Apps	Goals
Chester	2010–11	NPL Division One North	41	9	—		—		4 (Note: Three appearances in the Presidents Cup, one in NPL League Cup)	1	45	10
Chester	2011–12	NPL Premier Division	38	4	—		—		6 (Note: Four appearances in FA Trophy, one in NPL League Cup and one in the Cheshire Senior Cup)	0	44	4
Chester	2012–13	Conference North	38	5	4	0	—		4 (Note: Four appearances in the Cheshire Senior Cup)	1	46	6
Chester	2013–14	Conference Premier	21	0	1	0	—		2 (Note: Two appearances in Cheshire Senior Cup)	0	24	0
Chester	Total		138	18	5	0	0	0	16	2	159	20
Career total			138	18	5	0	0	0	16	2	159	20
