= 2020–21 FK Partizan season =

FK Partizan
2020–21 season
- President: Milorad Vučelić
- Head coach: Savo Milošević (until 1 September 2020); Aleksandar Stanojević
- Stadium: Partizan Stadium
- Serbian SuperLiga: 2nd
- Serbian Cup: Runners-up
- Europa League: Third qualifying round
- Top goalscorer: League: Takuma Asano (18); All: Takuma Asano (21)
Home colours	Away colours	Third colours
- All statistics correct as of May 26, 2021.

The 2020–21 season will be Fudbalski Klub Partizan's 74th season in existence and the club's 15th competing in the Serbian SuperLiga.

== Transfers ==
=== In ===
Date	Position	Name	From	Type	Ref.
16 June 2020	CB	(Cameroon) Macky Bagnack	(Slovenia) Olimpija Ljubljana	Transfer	
27 July 2020	DF	(Serbia) Dušan Lalatović	(Slovakia) DAC Dunajská Streda	Free Transfer	
4 August 2020	MF	(Serbia) Dennis Stojković	Free agent	Free Transfer	
3 September 2020	DF	(Serbia) Aleksandar Miljković	(Armenia) Alashkert	Free Transfer	
2 October 2020	FW	(Hungary) Filip Holender	(Switzerland) Lugano	Loan	
4 October 2020	DF	(Serbia) Ivan Obradović	(Poland) Legia Warsaw	Free Transfer	
4 October 2020	MF	(Serbia) Miloš Jojić	(Turkey) İstanbul Başakşehir	Free Transfer	
4 October 2020	DF	(Serbia) Svetozar Marković	(Greece) Olympiacos	Loan	
7 October 2020	FW	(France) Jean-Christophe Bahebeck	(Netherlands) Utrecht	Free Transfer	
1 January 2021	FW	(Serbia) Filip Stevanović	(England) Manchester City	Loan	
8 January 2021	DF	(Serbia) Marko Živković	(Serbia) Voždovac	Transfer	
3 February 2021	FW	(Serbia) Nikola Terzić	(Serbia) Čukarički	Free Transfer	

=== Out ===
Date	Position	Name	To	Type	Ref.
30 June 2020	CB	(Serbia) Strahinja Pavlović	(France) AS Monaco	Loan return	
16 July 2020	FW	(Serbia) Petar Gigić	(Hungary) Újpest	Loan	
16 July 2020	GK	(Serbia) Marko Jovičić	(Serbia) Inđija	Free Transfer	
29 July 2020	FW	(Serbia) Savo Arambašić	(Serbia) Metalac GM	Loan	
31 July 2020	FW	(Serbia) Nemanja Nikolić	(Serbia) Spartak Subotica	Loan	
31 July 2020	MF	(Serbia) Ivan Milosavljević	(Serbia) Voždovac	Free Transfer	
24 August 2020	FW	(Serbia) Slobodan Stanojlović	(Serbia) Teleoptik	Loan	
28 August 2020	FW	(Serbia) Đorđe Ivanović	(Slovenia) Olimpija Ljubljana	Transfer	
7 September 2020	DF	(Serbia) Nemanja Miletić	(Saudi Arabia) Al Raed	Transfer	
2 October 2020	DF	(Serbia) Dušan Lalatović	(Serbia) Teleoptik	Loan	
5 October 2020	FW	(Nigeria) Umar Sadiq	(Spain) Almería	Transfer	
5 October 2020	DF	(Serbia) Dragan Čubra	(Serbia) TSC	Free Transfer	
7 October 2020	FW	(Serbia) Bojan Matić	(Greece) Atromitos	Loan	
7 October 2020	MF	(Serbia) Miljan Momčilović	(Serbia) Teleoptik	Loan	
16 October 2020	FW	(Serbia) Nemanja Nikolić	(Saudi Arabia) Al Raed	Transfer	
20 October 2020	DF	(Serbia) Uroš Vitas	(Saudi Arabia) Al Qadsiah	Transfer	
1 January 2021	FW	(Serbia) Filip Stevanović	(England) Manchester City	Transfer	
11 January 2021	GK	(Serbia) Đorđe Vukanić	(Serbia) Spartak Subotica	Free Transfer	
13 January 2021	FW	(Serbia) Slobodan Stanojlović	(Serbia) Loznica	Loan	
20 January 2021	DF	(Montenegro) Periša Pešukić	(Serbia) Novi Pazar	Loan	
29 January 2021	FW	(Serbia) Petar Gigić	(Serbia) Novi Pazar	Loan	
2 May 2021	FW	(Japan) Takuma Asano		Released	

== Players ==
=== Squad ===
No.	Name	Nationality	Position (s)	Date of Birth (Age)	Signed from	Notes
Goalkeepers
1	Matija Gočmanac	(Serbia)	GK	5 August 2003 (age 23)	Youth system	
41	Aleksandar Popović	(Serbia)	GK	29 September 1999 (age 26)	Youth system	
85	Nemanja Stevanović	(Serbia)	GK	8 May 1992 (age 34)	(Serbia) Čukarički	
88	Vladimir Stojković	(Serbia)	GK	28 July 1983 (age 43)	(England) Nottingham Forest	Captain
Defenders
3	Macky Bagnack	(Cameroon)	CB	7 June 1995 (age 31)	(Slovenia) Olimpija Ljubljana	
4	Svetozar Marković	(Serbia)	CB	23 March 2000 (age 26)	(Greece) Olympiacos	Loan
5	Igor Vujačić	(Montenegro)	CB	8 August 1994 (age 32)	(Montenegro) Zeta	
17	Marko Živković	(Serbia)	RB	17 May 1994 (age 32)	(Serbia) Voždovac	
23	Bojan Ostojić	(Serbia)	CB	12 February 1984 (age 42)	(Serbia) Čukarički	Vice-captain
26	Aleksandar Miljković	(Serbia)	RB	26 February 1990 (age 36)	(Armenia) Alashkert	
30	Aleksa Purić	(Serbia)	CB	7 July 2003 (age 23)	Youth system	
31	Rajko Brežančić	(Serbia)	LB	21 August 1989 (age 37)	(Spain) Málaga	
37	Ivan Obradović	(Serbia)	LB	25 July 1988 (age 38)	(Poland) Legia Warsaw	
72	Slobodan Urošević	(Serbia)	LB	15 April 1994 (age 32)	(Serbia) Napredak Kruševac	
Midfielders
6	Bibras Natkho	(Israel)	CM	18 February 1988 (age 38)	(Greece) Olympiacos	
7	Dennis Stojković	(Serbia)	AM	3 August 2002 (age 24)	Free Agent	
10	Lazar Pavlović	(Serbia)	AM	2 November 2001 (age 24)	Youth system	
16	Saša Zdjelar	(Serbia)	DM	20 March 1995 (age 31)	(Greece) Olympiacos	
19	Aleksandar Šćekić	(Montenegro)	DM	12 December 1991 (age 34)	(Turkey) Gençlerbirliği	
20	Seydouba Soumah	(Guinea)	AM	11 June 1991 (age 35)	(Slovakia) Slovan Bratislava	
39	Miloš Jojić	(Serbia)	CM	19 March 1992 (age 34)	(Turkey) İstanbul Başakşehira	
51	Vanja Vlahović	(Serbia)	AM	23 March 2004 (age 22)	Youth system	
99	Milan Smiljanić	(Serbia)	DM	19 November 1986 (age 39)	(Israel) Hapoel Ashkelon	Vice-captain
Forwards
8	Filip Holender	(Hungary)	RW / CF	27 July 1994 (age 32)	(Switzerland) Lugano	Loan
9	Jean-Christophe Bahebeck	(France)	CF	1 May 1993 (age 33)	(Netherlands) Utrecht	
14	Samed Baždar	(Serbia)	CF	31 January 2004 (age 22)	Youth system	
32	Nikola Štulić	(Serbia)	CF	8 September 2001 (age 25)	Youth system	
33	Marko Milovanović	(Serbia)	CF	4 August 2003 (age 23)	Youth system	
36	Nikola Terzić	(Serbia)	RW	28 September 2000 (age 25)	(Serbia) Čukarički	
50	Lazar Marković	(Serbia)	RW	2 March 1994 (age 32)	(England) Fulham	
70	Nikola Čolić	(Serbia)	FW / RW	17 August 2002 (age 24)	Youth system	
77	Nemanja Jović	(Bosnia and Herzegovina)	FW / LW	8 August 2002 (age 24)	Youth system	
80	Filip Stevanović	(Serbia)	LW	25 September 2002 (age 23)	Youth system	
87	Nikola Lakčević	(Serbia)	FW / RW	28 October 1999 (age 26)	(Serbia) OFK Beograd	
90	Mihajlo Petković	(Serbia)	LW	27 May 2004 (age 22)	Youth system	
97	Aleksandar Lutovac	(Serbia)	RW / RB	28 June 1997 (age 29)	(Serbia) Rad	

== Friendlies ==
16 July 2020 Friendly	Partizan (Serbia)	2–0	(Serbia) Trepča	Čajetina, Serbia
18:00	Ivanović 9'; Sadiq 44'	Report		Stadium: Stadion Švajcarija; Attendance: 0 Referee: (Serbia) Predrag Simić

18 July 2020 Friendly	Partizan (Serbia)	2–2	(Serbia) Mladost Lučani	Užice, Serbia
17:30	Sadiq 44'; Natkho 42' (pen.)	Report	Krajišnik 58'; Babić 72'	Stadium: Užice City Stadium; Attendance: 0

22 July 2020 Friendly	Partizan (Serbia)	2–1	(Serbia) Zlatibor Čajetina	Užice, Serbia
18:00	Sadiq 31'; Asano 53'	Report	Adama 48'	Stadium: Užice City Stadium; Attendance: 0 Referee: (Serbia) Marko Stojković

26 July 2020 Friendly	Partizan (Serbia)	4–0	(Serbia) Proleter Novi Sad	Belgrade, Serbia
17:30	Natkho 45'; Marković 52'; Soumah 61'; Zdjelar 87'	Report		Stadium: Partizan Stadium; Attendance: 0 Referee: (Serbia) Pavle Tomić

13 October 2020 Friendly	Partizan (Serbia)	3–0	(Serbia) Zemun	Belgrade, Serbia
	Bahebeck; Jović			Stadium: SC Partizan-Teleoptik; Attendance: 0

2 December 2020 Friendly	Partizan (Serbia)	2–0	(Serbia) Žarkovo	Belgrade, Serbia
11:30	Stojković; Milovanović	Report		Stadium: SC Partizan-Teleoptik; Attendance: 0

17 January 2021 Friendly	Partizan (Serbia)	2–1	(Poland) Zagłębie Lubin	Antalya, Turkey
13:00	Holender 30'; Štulić 88'	Report	Mráz 40'

21 January 2021 Friendly	Partizan (Serbia)	2–5	(Russia) Rubin Kazan	Antalya, Turkey
13:00	Natkho 53'; Soumah 75' (pen.)	Report	Makarov 11'; Jevtić 22'; Kvaratskhelia 39'; Kosarev 61'; Ignatyev 85' (pen.)

25 January 2021 Friendly	Partizan (Serbia)	1–0	(Ukraine) Desna Chernihiv	Antalya, Turkey
14:00	Bahebeck 54'	Report

28 January 2021 Friendly	Partizan (Serbia)	1–0	(Ukraine) Rukh Lviv	Antalya, Turkey
09:00	Holender 23'	Report

28 January 2021 Friendly	Partizan (Serbia)	3–0	(North Macedonia) Sileks	Antalya, Turkey
13:00	Asano 66', 80'; Milovanović 87'	Report

8 February 2021 Friendly	Partizan (Serbia)	2–0	(Serbia) Teleoptik	Belgrade, Serbia
15:30	Petković; Vlahović			Stadium: SC Partizan-Teleoptik

24 February 2021 Friendly	Partizan (Serbia)	6–0	(Serbia) Teleoptik	Belgrade, Serbia
	Stevanović; Bahebeck; Milovanović; Lakčević; Vlahović; Baždar	Report		Stadium: SC Partizan-Teleoptik

27 February 2021 Friendly	Partizan (Serbia)	5–1	(Serbia) Rembas	Belgrade, Serbia
11:00	Bahebeck; Terzić; Milovanović; Lakčević	Report	Đorđević	Stadium: SC Partizan-Teleoptik

17 March 2021 Friendly	Partizan (Serbia)	0–1	(Serbia) Prva iskra Barič	Belgrade, Serbia
		Report		Stadium: SC Partizan-Teleoptik

== Competitions ==
=== Overview ===
Competition	Record							
Competition	P	W	D	L	GF	GA	GD	Win %
Serbian SuperLiga	38	31	2	5	95	20	+75	81.58
Serbian Cup	5	4	1	0	8	0	+8	80.00
UEFA Europa League	3	2	0	1	3	2	+1	66.67
Total	46	37	3	6	106	22	+84	80.43

=== Serbian SuperLiga ===
==== Regular season ====
===== League table =====
Pos	Team	Pld	W	D	L	GF	GA	GD	Pts	Qualification or relegation
1	Red Star Belgrade (C)	38	35	3	0	114	20	+94	108	Qualification for the Champions League second qualifying round
2	Partizan	38	31	2	5	95	20	+75	95	Qualification to Europa Conference League second qualifying round
3	Čukarički	38	22	8	8	69	34	+35	74	Qualification to Europa Conference League second qualifying round
4	Vojvodina	38	21	8	9	62	41	+21	71	Qualification to Europa Conference League second qualifying round
5	TSC	38	17	7	14	68	50	+18	58	

Source: SuperLiga (in Serbian), Soccerway
Rules for classification: 1) Points; 2) Head-to-head points; 3) Head-to-head goal difference; 4) Head-to-head goals scored; 5) Head-to-head away goals scored (if two teams tied); 6) Goal difference; 7) Goals scored; 8) Fair play ranking; 9) Draw.
(C) Champions

===== Results by matchday =====
Round	1	2	3	4	5	6	7	8	9	10	11	12	13	14	15	16	17	18	19	20	21	22	23	24	25	26	27	28	29	30	31	32	33	34	35	36	37	38
Ground	A	A	H	A	H	A	H	A	H	A	H	A	H	A	H	A	H	A	H	H	H	A	H	A	H	A	H	A	H	A	H	A	H	A	H	A	H	A
Result	W	L	W	W	W	L	W	W	W	D	D	L	W	W	W	W	W	W	W	W	W	W	W	W	W	W	W	W	W	L	W	W	W	W	W	W	W	L
Position	5	8	7	4	3	5	3	2	2	2	2	3	3	3	2	2	2	2	2	2	2	2	2	2	2	2	2	2	2	2	2	2	2	2	2	2	2	2

Updated to match(es) played on 18 May 2021. Source: Partizan
A = Away; H = Home; W = Win; D = Draw; L = Loss

=== Results ===
1 August 2020 1	Napredak Kruševac	1–3	Partizan	Kruševac
17:30	Leković (yellow card) 3'; Kočić 45+3'; Spremo (yellow card) 54'; Mrkić (yellow card) 57'; Milovanović (yellow card) 69'; Stević (yellow card) 85'; Živanović (yellow card) 85'	Report	Marković 47'; Urošević (yellow card) 57'; Natkho 86' (pen.); Čolić 90+5'	Stadium: Mladost Stadium; Attendance: 0 Referee: (Serbia) Danilo Grujić

5 August 2020 2	Novi Pazar	3–2	Partizan	Novi Pazar
17:00	Nedeljković 22' (pen.) (yellow card) 61'; Delimeđac (yellow card) 30'; Perić 73'; Miletić 78' (o.g.); Resić (yellow card) 86'	Report	Vitas (yellow card) 36'; Soumah 59'; Asano 70'; Miletić (yellow card) 86'	Stadium: Novi Pazar City Stadium; Attendance: 0 Referee: (Serbia) Novak Simović

9 August 2020 3	Partizan	4–0	Javor Ivanjica	Belgrade
20:30	Sadiq 13', 18'; Soumah 25'; Lutovac (yellow card) 58'; Asano 76'	Report		Stadium: Partizan Stadium; Attendance: 0 Referee: (Serbia) Zoran Široki

15 August 2020 4	Radnik Surdulica	0–2	Partizan	Surdulica
19:00	Lukić (yellow card) 57'; Stevanović (yellow card) 68'; Stamenković (yellow card) 90+2'	Report	Asano 62'; Zdjelar (yellow card) 63'; Lutovac (yellow card) 87'; Popović (yellow card) 89'; Sadiq 90'	Stadium: Surdulica City Stadium; Attendance: 0 Referee: (Serbia) Lazar Lukić

22 August 2020 5	Partizan	5–0	Inđija	Belgrade
19:30	Natkho 20' (pen.); Asano 48', 65', 76'; Zdjelar 60'	Report	Đorđević (yellow card) 43'	Stadium: Partizan Stadium; Attendance: 0 Referee: (Serbia) Novica Anđelovski

30 August 2020 6	Vojvodina	3–2	Partizan	Novi Sad
18:45	Drinčić (yellow card) 42'; Vukadinović 51'; Čović (yellow card) 59'; Mladenović 89'; Stojković 90+3'	Report	Sadiq (yellow card) 20' (goal) 40'; Vitas (yellow card) 29'; Soumah (red card) 42'; Smiljanić (yellow card) 44'; Šćekić 69'	Stadium: Karađorđe Stadium; Attendance: 0 Referee: (Serbia) Srđan Jovanović

12 September 2020 7	Partizan	3–0	Rad	Belgrade
20:00	Stojsavljević 31' (o.g.); Urošević (yellow card) 48'; Stevanović 50'; Sadiq 80' (pen.)	Report	Trninić (yellow card) 13'; Đorić (red card) 47'	Stadium: Partizan Stadium; Attendance: 0 Referee: (Serbia) Petar Piper

20 September 2020 8	Zlatibor Čajetina	0–1	Partizan	Užice
19:00	Jezdimirović (yellow card) 64'; Anđelković (yellow card) 77'; Vidić (yellow card) 77'; Đakovac (yellow card) 80'	Report	Natkho 80' (pen.); Lutovac (yellow card) 90+1'; Miljković (yellow card) 90+3'	Stadium: Užice City Stadium; Attendance: 0 Referee: (Serbia) Zoran Široki

28 September 2020 9	Partizan	2–1	Bačka BP	Belgrade
18:00	Sadiq 50'; Tomović 61' (o.g.)	Report	Đorđević 77'	Stadium: Partizan Stadium; Attendance: 0 Referee: (Serbia) Nenad Minaković

3 October 2020 10	Metalac	1–1	Partizan	Gornji Milanovac
18:00	Vranjanin (yellow card) 43' (yellow-red card) 62'; Antonijević 81'	Report	Soumah (yellow card) 32'; Stevanović 46'	Stadium: Stadion Metalac; Attendance: 0 Referee: (Serbia) Milan Ilić

18 October 2020 11	Partizan	1–1	Red Star Belgrade	Belgrade
17:00	Stevanović 6'; Marković (yellow card) 63'; Jojić (yellow card) 74'; Ostojić (yellow card) 80'	Report	Falcinelli (yellow card) 22'; Sanogo (yellow card) 31' (yellow-red card) 90+4'; Gobeljić (yellow card) 60'; Katai 75' (pen.); Degenek (yellow card) 78'; Pavkov (yellow card) 80'; Eraković (yellow card) 83'; Gajić (yellow card) 86'	Stadium: Partizan Stadium; Attendance: 0 Referee: (Serbia) Novak Simović

26 October 2020 12	Radnički Niš	1–0	Partizan	Niš
17:00	Gavrić (yellow card) 66'; Pantelić 78'	Report	Marković (yellow card) 41'; Stojković (yellow card) 66'	Stadium: Čair Stadium; Attendance: 0 Referee: (Serbia) Miloš Milanović

31 October 2020 13	Partizan	2–0	Mačva Šabac	Belgrade
17:00	Natkho 46' (pen.); Marković 71'	Report	Zukanović (yellow card) 74'	Stadium: Partizan Stadium; Attendance: 0 Referee: (Serbia) Milan Mitić

7 November 2020 14	Spartak Subotica	1–2	Partizan	Subotica
18:00	Marčić (yellow card) 6'; Ivančević (yellow card) 19'; Tufegdžić 60'; Vidaković (yellow card) 65'; Tekijaški (yellow card) 90+4'	Report	Šćekić (yellow card) 24' (goal) 71'; Asano 34'; Natkho (yellow card) 56'; Lutovac (yellow card) 90'	Stadium: Subotica City Stadium; Attendance: 0 Referee: (Serbia) Nenad Minaković

21 November 2020 15	Partizan	1–0	Proleter Novi Sad	Belgrade
16:00	Holender 90+1' (pen.) (yellow card) 90+1'; Miljković (yellow card) 90+2'	Report	Andrejević (yellow card) 60'; Milošević (yellow card) 75'; Kojić (yellow card) 86'	Stadium: Partizan Stadium; Attendance: 0 Referee: (Serbia) Aleksandar Živković

29 November 2020 16	TSC	0–4	Partizan	Senta
17:00	Antonić (yellow card) 43'; Milićević (yellow card) 59'	Report	Vujačić (yellow card) 18'; Holender 24', 62'; Soumah 61'; Asano 71'	Stadium: Senta City Stadium; Attendance: 0 Referee: (Serbia) Nenad Minaković

5 December 2020 17	Partizan	1–0	Čukarički	Belgrade
16:00	Zdjelar (yellow card) 42'; Marković (yellow card) 47'; Štulić 86'; Šćekić (yellow card) 90'	Report	N'Diaye (yellow card) 33'; Kajević (yellow card) 45'; Mijailović (yellow card) 51'; Okeuhie (yellow card) 89'; Ostojić (yellow card) 90'	Stadium: Partizan Stadium; Attendance: 0 Referee: (Serbia) Lazar Lukić

12 December 2020 18	Voždovac	0–2	Partizan	Belgrade
17:00	Milović (yellow card) 67'	Report	Zdjelar (yellow card) 19'; Bagnack (yellow card) 49'; Asano 50'; Urošević (yellow card) 77'; Marković 78'	Stadium: Voždovac Stadium; Attendance: 0 Referee: (Serbia) Zoran Široki

16 December 2020 19	Partizan	4–0	Mladost Lučani	Belgrade
14:00	Asano 25'; Natkho 42' (pen.); Vujačić (yellow card) 44'; Obradović 59'; Marković 84'	Report	Šatara (yellow card) 20'; Krajišnik (yellow card) 41'	Stadium: Partizan Stadium; Attendance: 0 Referee: (Serbia) Milan Minić

6 February 2021 20	Partizan	3–0	Napredak Kruševac	Belgrade
17:00	Jović 14'; Holender 40' (yellow card) 90+1'; Marković 71'	Report	Milovanović (yellow card) 53'	Stadium: Partizan Stadium; Attendance: 0 Referee: (Serbia) Miloš Milanović

12 February 2021 21	Partizan	4–1	Novi Pazar	Belgrade
16:30	Marković 54'; Natkho 61' (pen.); Holender 64'; Jović (yellow card) 75'; Vlajković 88' (o.g.)	Report	Zimonjić (yellow card) 22'; Hadžibulić (yellow card) 31'; Aganspahić 76'; Nikčević (yellow card) 80'	Stadium: Partizan Stadium; Attendance: 0 Referee: (Serbia) Milan Mitić

17 February 2021 22	Javor Ivanjica	0–1	Partizan	Ivanjica
13:00	Dimitrijević (yellow card) 25'; Tričković (yellow card) 30'	Report	Urošević 14'	Stadium: Ivanjica Stadium; Attendance: 0 Referee: (Serbia) Nenad Minaković

21 February 2021 23	Partizan	3–0	Radnik Surdulica	Belgrade
13:00	Vujačić 44'; Šćekić 54'; Asano 63'	Report	Kričak (yellow card) 2'; Jokić (yellow card) 39' (yellow-red card) 58'	Stadium: Partizan Stadium; Attendance: 0 Referee: (Serbia) Dragan Čolović

26 February 2021 24	Inđija	0–6	Partizan	Inđija
13:00		Report	Natkho 7' (pen.); Marković 41'; Jojić 45+2'; Asano 51'; Jović 79'; Vujačić 90'	Stadium: Inđija Stadium; Attendance: 0 Referee: (Serbia) Novak Simović

2 March 2021 25	Partizan	2–0	Vojvodina	Belgrade
16:00	Asano 25', 64'; Jojić (yellow card) 90'	Report	Noveski (yellow card) 17'; Bojić (yellow card) 62'	Stadium: Partizan Stadium; Attendance: 0 Referee: (Serbia) Miloš Milanović

7 March 2021 26	Rad	0–5	Partizan	Belgrade
17:05	Stojsavljević (red card) 88'	Report	Holender 24', 48'; Natkho 35'; Soumah 66'; Stevanović 72'	Stadium: King Peter I Stadium; Attendance: 0 Referee: (Serbia) Lazar Lukić

15 March 2021 27	Partizan	5–1	Zlatibor Čajetina	Belgrade
18:10	Jović 21'; Asano 34'; Natkho 44' (pen.); Bahebeck 74'; Urošević 83'	Report	Sević 52'; Stamenković (yellow card) 89'	Stadium: Partizan Stadium; Attendance: 0 Referee: (Serbia) Milan Mitić

20 March 2021 28	Bačka BP	0–4	Partizan	Bačka Palanka
15:00	Stojanović (yellow card) 21'; Svarups (yellow card) 76'; Pantić (yellow card) 80'; Žakula (yellow card) 85'	Report	Vujačić 44' (yellow card) 44'; Marković 62' (yellow card) 57'; Asano 58'; Jović 87'	Stadium: Slavko Maletin Vava Stadium; Attendance: 0 Referee: (Serbia) Miloš Đorđić

3 April 2021 29	Partizan	3–0	Metalac	Belgrade
19:05	Marković (yellow card) 43' (goal) 58'; Soumah 45' (pen.); Jojić 53'; Pavlović (yellow card) 86'	Report	Mlađović (yellow card) 44'	Stadium: Partizan Stadium; Attendance: 0 Referee: (Serbia) Danilo Grujić

7 April 2021 30	Red Star Belgrade	1–0	Partizan	Belgrade
18:00	Rodić (yellow card) 13'; Ivanić 58'; Degenek (yellow card) 76'; Milunović (yellow card) 78'; Gobeljić (yellow card) 90+4'	Report	Marković (yellow card) 73'; Miljković (yellow card) 85'	Stadium: Red Star Stadium; Attendance: 0 Referee: (Serbia) Novak Simović

11 April 2021 31	Partizan	2–0	Radnički Niš	Belgrade
19:00	Ostojić (yellow card) 13'; Soumah (yellow card) 36'; Asano 44'; Holender 57'	Report	Kovačević (yellow card) 75'	Stadium: Partizan Stadium; Attendance: 0 Referee: (Serbia) Miloš Đorđić

16 April 2021 32	Mačva Šabac	1–2	Partizan	Šabac
18:05	Knežević 3'; Sladojević (yellow card) 16'; Mijailović (yellow card) 47'; Panić (yellow card) 88'; Gordić (yellow card) 90+4'	Report	Asano 43'; Štulić (yellow card) 45+1'; Marković 56'	Stadium: Gradski stadion Šabac; Attendance: 0 Referee: (Serbia) Pavle Tomić

25 April 2021 33	Partizan	2–1	Spartak Subotica	Belgrade
19:30	Zdjelar (yellow card) 24'; Pavlović 38'; Vujačić (yellow card) 79'; Natkho 88' (pen.)	Report	Marčić (yellow card) 16' (goal) 80'; Furtula (yellow card) 22'; Tekijaški (yellow card) 37'; Dunđerski (yellow card) 59'; Ivančević (red card) 88'	Stadium: Partizan Stadium; Attendance: 0 Referee: (Serbia) Nenad Minaković

29 April 2021 34	Proleter Novi Sad	1–3	Partizan	Novi Sad
16:55	Kojić (yellow card) 75'; Mirosavljev 78'	Report	Marković 38'; Marković 76'; Asano (yellow card) 86'; Jojić 90+1'	Stadium: Karađorđe Stadium; Attendance: 0 Referee: (Serbia) Milan Mitić

5 May 2021 35	Partizan	3–1	TSC	Belgrade
16:00	Holender (yellow card) 17' (goal) 64'; Natkho 54' (pen.); Vujačić (yellow card) 63'; Jojić 67'	Report	Stanojev (yellow card) 47'; Jojić (yellow card) 53'; Duronjić 83'; Tumbasević (yellow card) 87'	Stadium: Partizan Stadium; Attendance: 0 Referee: (Serbia) Srđan Jovanović

9 May 2021 36	Čukarički	0–2	Partizan	Belgrade
16:40	Stevanović (yellow card) 89'	Report	Šćekić 1'; Jović (yellow card) 29'; Marković (yellow card) 62'; Stojković (yellow card) 78'; Vujačić 80'	Stadium: Čukarički Stadium; Attendance: 0 Referee: (Serbia) Lazar Lukić

15 May 2021 37	Partizan	3–0	Voždovac	Belgrade
16:00	Bogdanović 21' (o.g.); Vujačić (yellow card) 35'; Jojić (yellow card) 60'; Jović 73'; Natkho 79'; Bagnack (yellow card) 85'	Report	Hajdin (yellow card) 36'; Milojević (yellow card) 43'	Stadium: Partizan Stadium; Attendance: 0 Referee: (Serbia) Miloš Đorđić

18 May 2021 38	Mladost Lučani	1–0	Partizan	Lučani
18:05	Bojović 24'; Šatara (yellow card) 41'	Report	Miljković (yellow card) 10'; Vujačić (yellow card) 82'	Stadium: Mladost Stadium; Attendance: 0 Referee: (Serbia) Stanko Ostraćanin

=== Serbian Cup ===
21 October 2020 First round	Partizan	2–0	Bačka BP	Belgrade
16:00	Pavlović 7' (yellow card) 53'; Stojković (yellow card) 44'; Obradović (yellow card) 72'; Asano 75'	Report	Radjen (yellow card) 12'; Đorđević (yellow card) 90+3'	Stadium: Partizan Stadium; Attendance: 0 Referee: (Serbia) Nenad Minaković

25 November 2020 Second round	Metalac G.M.	0–1	Partizan	Gornji Milanovac, Serbia
16:00		Report	Asano 44'	Stadium: Stadion Metalac; Attendance: 0 Referee: (Serbia) Milan Mitić

11 March 2021 Quarterfinals	Partizan	4–0	Voždovac	Belgrade
17:05	Šćekić (yellow card) 24'; Vujačić 32' (yellow card) 56'; Asano 52'; Natkho 58'	Report	Purtić (yellow card) 20'	Stadium: Partizan Stadium; Attendance: 0 Referee: (Serbia) Novica Anđelovski

21 April 2021 Semifinals	Vojvodina	0–1	Partizan	Novi Sad
19:05	Čović (yellow card) 9'; Mrkaić (yellow card) 32'; Andrić (yellow card) 39'; Bralić (yellow card) 72'	Report	Marković 11'; Šćekić (yellow card) 40'; Miljković (yellow card) 49'	Stadium: Karađorđe Stadium; Attendance: 0 Referee: (Serbia) Srđan Jovanović

25 May 2021 Final	Red Star Belgrade	0–0 (4–2 p)	Partizan	Belgrade
19:00	Ben (yellow card) 62'; Gobeljić (yellow card) 87'	Report	Marković (yellow card) 62'; Zdjelar (yellow card) 84'; Miljković (yellow card) 85'; Stojković (yellow card) 85'	Stadium: Red Star Stadium; Attendance: 0 Referee: (Serbia) Srđan Jovanović
	Penalties
	Rodić (penalty scored); Pankov (penalty scored); Krstović (penalty scored); Nikolić (penalty scored)		Natkho (penalty scored); Živković (penalty scored); Stevanović (penalty scored); Jojić (penalty missed); Štulić (penalty missed)

=== UEFA Europa League ===
27 August 2020 First qualifying round	Partizan (Serbia)	1–0	(Latvia) RFS	Belgrade, Serbia
21:00	Natkho 52' (pen.); Urošević (yellow card) 80'; Miletić (yellow card) 90'; Vitas (yellow card) 90+4'	Report; Report	Šimkovič (yellow card) 52'; Lipušček (yellow card) 63'	Stadium: Partizan Stadium; Attendance: 0 Referee: (Armenia) Zaven Hovhannisyan

17 September 2020 Second qualifying round	Sfântul Gheorghe Suruceni (Moldova)	0–1 (a.e.t.)	(Serbia) Partizan	Chișinău, Moldova
19:00	Slivca (yellow card) 45+2'; Svinarenco (yellow card) 103'; Ghecev (yellow card) 114'; Smyrnov (yellow card) 120+2'	Report	Sadiq (yellow card) 34'; Natkho (yellow card) 78' (goal) 104' (pen.); Lutovac (yellow card) 101'; Stojković (yellow card) 119'; Marković (yellow card) 120+1'; Matić (yellow card) 120+5'	Stadium: Zimbru Stadium; Attendance: 0 Referee: (Estonia) Juri Frischer

24 September 2020 Third qualifying round	Charleroi (Belgium)	2–1 (a.e.t.)	(Serbia) Partizan	Charleroi, Belgium
19:00	Dessoleil 10'; Gholizadeh (yellow card) 93'; Rezaei 108'	Report	Soumah 53'; Marković (yellow card) 54'; Ostojić (yellow card) 106'	Stadium: Stade du Pays de Charleroi; Attendance: 0 Referee: (Scotland) Bobby Madden

== Statistics ==
=== Squad statistics ===
No.	Pos	Nat	Player	Total		SuperLiga		Cup		Europe League	
No.	Pos	Nat	Player	Apps	Goals	Apps	Goals	Apps	Goals	Apps	Goals
Goalkeepers
1	GK	(Serbia) SRB	Matija Gočmanac	0	0	0	0	0	0	0	0
41	GK	(Serbia) SRB	Aleksandar Popović	21	0	21	0	0	0	0	0
85	GK	(Serbia) SRB	Nemanja Stevanović	4	0	2	0	2	0	0	0
88	GK	(Serbia) SRB	Vladimir Stojković	21	0	15	0	3	0	3	0
Defenders
3	DF	(Cameroon) CMR	Macky Bagnack	18	0	16	0	0	0	2	0
4	DF	(Serbia) SRB	Svetozar Marković	29	2	24	1	5	1	0	0
5	DF	(Montenegro) MNE	Igor Vujačić	26	5	22	4	4	1	0	0
17	DF	(Serbia) SRB	Marko Živković	7	0	5	0	2	0	0	0
23	DF	(Serbia) SRB	Bojan Ostojić	13	0	9	0	2	0	2	0
26	DF	(Serbia) SRB	Aleksandar Miljković	32	0	25	0	5	0	2	0
30	DF	(Serbia) SRB	Aleksa Purić	0	0	0	0	0	0	0	0
31	DF	(Serbia) SRB	Rajko Brežančić	4	0	4	0	0	0	0	0
37	DF	(Serbia) SRB	Ivan Obradović	20	1	17	1	3	0	0	0
72	DF	(Serbia) SRB	Slobodan Urošević	32	2	25	2	4	0	3	0
Midfielders
6	MF	(Israel) ISR	Bibras Natkho	41	15	33	12	5	1	3	2
7	MF	(Serbia) SRB	Dennis Stojković	10	0	7	0	1	0	2	0
10	MF	(Serbia) SRB	Lazar Pavlović	20	2	18	1	2	1	0	0
16	MF	(Serbia) SRB	Saša Zdjelar	38	1	31	1	4	0	3	0
19	MF	(Montenegro) MNE	Aleksandar Šćekić	40	5	33	4	4	1	3	0
20	MF	(Guinea) GUI	Seydouba Soumah	29	6	24	5	2	0	3	1
39	MF	(Serbia) SRB	Miloš Jojić	29	4	24	4	5	0	0	0
51	MF	(Serbia) SRB	Vanja Vlahović	0	0	0	0	0	0	0	0
80	MF	(Serbia) SRB	Filip Stevanović	33	4	27	4	3	0	3	0
99	MF	(Serbia) SRB	Milan Smiljanić	7	0	6	0	0	0	1	0
Forwards
8	FW	(Hungary) HUN	Filip Holender	29	9	25	9	4	0	0	0
9	FW	(France) FRA	Jean-Christophe Bahebeck	7	1	6	1	1	0	0	0
14	FW	(Serbia) SRB	Samed Baždar	1	0	1	0	0	0	0	0
32	FW	(Serbia) SRB	Nikola Štulić	22	1	18	1	4	0	0	0
33	FW	(Serbia) SRB	Marko Milovanović	0	0	0	0	0	0	0	0
36	FW	(Serbia) SRB	Nikola Terzić	1	0	1	0	0	0	0	0
50	FW	(Serbia) SRB	Lazar Marković	33	11	27	11	4	0	2	0
70	FW	(Serbia) SRB	Nikola Čolić	7	1	7	1	0	0	0	0
77	FW	(Serbia) SRB	Nemanja Jović	21	5	19	5	2	0	0	0
87	FW	(Serbia) SRB	Nikola Lakčević	0	0	0	0	0	0	0	0
90	FW	(Serbia) SRB	Mihajlo Petković	0	0	0	0	0	0	0	0
97	FW	(Serbia) SRB	Aleksandar Lutovac	22	0	18	0	3	0	1	0
Players transferred out during the season
2	DF	(Montenegro) MNE	Periša Pešukić	0	0	0	0	0	0	0	0
4	DF	(Serbia) SRB	Dušan Lalatović	0	0	0	0	0	0	0	0
9	FW	(Nigeria) NGR	Umar Sadiq	13	6	10	6	0	0	3	0
11	FW	(Japan) JPN	Takuma Asano	40	21	33	18	4	3	3	0
15	DF	(Serbia) SRB	Uroš Vitas	14	0	11	0	0	0	3	0
17	MF	(Serbia) SRB	Miljan Momčilović	0	0	0	0	0	0	0	0
18	FW	(Serbia) SRB	Đorđe Ivanović	5	0	5	0	0	0	0	0
33	FW	(Serbia) SRB	Slobodan Stanojlović	0	0	0	0	0	0	0	0
73	DF	(Serbia) SRB	Nemanja Miletić	5	0	4	0	0	0	1	0
91	FW	(Serbia) SRB	Bojan Matić	9	0	8	0	0	0	1	0

Last updated: 26 May 2021
Source: Competitions

=== Goal scorers ===
Rank	No.	Pos	Nat	Name	SuperLiga	Serbian Cup	Europe	Total
1	11	FW	(Japan)	Takuma Asano	18	3	0	21
2	6	MF	(Israel)	Bibras Natkho	12	1	2	15
3	50	FW	(Serbia)	Lazar Marković	11	0	0	11
4	8	FW	(Hungary)	Filip Holender	9	0	0	9
5	9	FW	(Nigeria)	Umar Sadiq	6	0	0	6
5	20	MF	(Guinea)	Seydouba Soumah	5	0	1	6
6	19	MF	(Montenegro)	Aleksandar Šćekić	4	1	0	5
6	5	DF	(Montenegro)	Igor Vujačić	4	1	0	5
6	77	FW	(Serbia)	Nemanja Jović	5	0	0	5
7	80	MF	(Serbia)	Filip Stevanović	4	0	0	4
7	39	MF	(Serbia)	Miloš Jojić	4	0	0	4
7	—	—		Own goal	4	0	0	4
8	72	DF	(Serbia)	Slobodan Urošević	2	0	0	2
8	19	MF	(Serbia)	Lazar Pavlović	1	1	0	2
8	4	DF	(Serbia)	Svetozar Marković	1	1	0	2
9	70	FW	(Serbia)	Nikola Čolić	1	0	0	1
9	16	MF	(Serbia)	Saša Zdjelar	1	0	0	1
9	32	FW	(Serbia)	Nikola Štulić	1	0	0	1
9	37	DF	(Serbia)	Ivan Obradović	1	0	0	1
9	72	DF	(Serbia)	Slobodan Urošević	1	0	0	1
Totals					95	8	3	106

Last updated: 15 May 2021

=== Clean sheets ===
Rank	No.	Pos	Nat	Name	SuperLiga	Serbian Cup	Europe	Total
1	41	GK	(Serbia)	Aleksandar Popović	13	0	0	13
1	88	GK	(Serbia)	Vladimir Stojković	8	3	2	13
2	85	GK	(Serbia)	Nemanja Stevanović	1	2	0	3
Totals					22	5	2	29

Last updated: 26 May 2021

=== Disciplinary record ===
Number	Nation	Position	Name	SuperLiga		Serbian Cup		Europe		Total	
Number	Nation	Position	Name	Booked	Sent off (straight red)	Booked	Sent off (straight red)	Booked	Sent off (straight red)	Booked	Sent off (straight red)
3	(Cameroon)	DF	Macky Bagnack	2	0	0	0	0	0	2	0
4	(Serbia)	DF	Svetozar Marković	2	0	0	0	0	0	2	0
5	(Montenegro)	DF	Igor Vujačić	7	0	1	0	0	0	8	0
6	(Israel)	MF	Bibras Natkho	1	0	0	0	1	0	2	0
7	(Serbia)	MF	Dennis Stojković	0	0	1	0	0	0	1	0
8	(Hungary)	FW	Filip Holender	3	0	0	0	0	0	3	0
9	(Nigeria)	FW	Umar Sadiq	1	0	0	0	1	0	2	0
10	(Serbia)	MF	Lazar Pavlović	1	0	1	0	0	0	2	0
11	(Japan)	FW	Takuma Asano	1	0	0	0	0	0	1	0
15	(Serbia)	DF	Uroš Vitas	2	0	0	0	1	0	3	0
16	(Serbia)	MF	Saša Zdjelar	4	0	1	0	0	0	5	0
19	(Montenegro)	MF	Aleksandar Šćekić	2	0	1	0	0	0	3	0
20	(Guinea)	MF	Seydouba Soumah	2	1	0	0	0	0	2	1
23	(Serbia)	DF	Bojan Ostojić	2	0	0	0	1	0	3	0
26	(Serbia)	DF	Aleksandar Miljković	4	0	2	0	0	0	6	0
32	(Serbia)	FW	Nikola Štulić	1	0	0	0	0	0	1	0
37	(Serbia)	DF	Ivan Obradović	0	0	1	0	0	0	1	0
39	(Serbia)	MF	Miloš Jojić	3	0	0	0	0	0	3	0
41	(Serbia)	GK	Aleksandar Popović	1	0	0	0	0	0	1	0
50	(Serbia)	MF	Lazar Marković	5	0	1	0	2	0	8	0
72	(Serbia)	DF	Slobodan Urošević	3	0	0	0	1	0	4	0
73	(Serbia)	DF	Nemanja Miletić	1	0	0	0	1	0	2	0
77	(Serbia)	FW	Nemanja Jović	2	0	0	0	0	0	2	0
88	(Serbia)	GK	Vladimir Stojković	2	0	1	0	1	0	4	0
91	(Serbia)	FW	Bojan Matić	0	0	0	0	1	0	1	0
97	(Serbia)	FW	Aleksandar Lutovac	4	0	0	0	1	0	5	0
99	(Serbia)	MF	Milan Smiljanić	1	0	0	0	0	0	1	0
			TOTALS	57	1	10	0	11	0	78	1

Last updated: 26 May 2021

=== Game as captain ===
Rank	No.	Pos	Nat	Name	SuperLiga	Serbian Cup	Europe	Total
1	88	GK	(Serbia)	Vladimir Stojković	15	3	3	21
2	16	MF	(Serbia)	Saša Zdjelar	10	1	0	11
3	50	FW	(Serbia)	Lazar Marković	7	1	0	8
4	23	DF	(Serbia)	Bojan Ostojić	3	0	0	3
5	39	MF	(Serbia)	Miloš Jojić	2	0	0	2
6	99	MF	(Serbia)	Milan Smiljanić	1	0	0	1
Totals					38	5	3	46

Last updated: 26 May 2021
