= 2021–22 FK Čukarički season =

Čukarički
2021-22 season
- Chairman: (Serbia) Dragan Obradović
- Head coach: (Bosnia and Herzegovina) Dušan Kerkez
- Stadium: Čukarički Stadium
- SuperLiga: 3rd
- Serbian Cup: Round of 32
- UEFA Europa Conference League: Third qualifying round
Home colours	Away colours

During this season FK Čukarički will have participated in the following competitions: Serbian SuperLiga, Serbian Cup, UEFA Europa Conference League.

== Current squad ==
=== First team ===
As of 19 May 2022

Note: Flags indicate national team as defined under FIFA eligibility rules; some limited exceptions apply. Players may hold more than one non-FIFA nationality.

No.	Pos.	Nation	Player
1	GK	SRB	Nemanja Belić
2	DF	SRB	Viktor Rogan
3	DF	SRB	Nemanja Tošić
4	DF	SRB	Bojan Kovačević
5	MF	SRB	Marko Docić (captain)
6	DF	SRB	Miladin Stevanović
11	FW	JAM	Norman Campbell
14	MF	SRB	Mitar Ergelaš
18	FW	BIH	Almir Aganspahić
19	DF	SRB	Strahinja Tanasijević
21	DF	SRB	Darko Puškarić
22	MF	SRB	Srđan Mijailović
23	MF	SRB	Stefan Čolović

No.	Pos.	Nation	Player
26	DF	SRB	Uroš Drezgić
27	MF	BIH	Milan Savić
35	GK	SRB	Novak Mićović
40	MF	SRB	Kristijan Belić
65	DF	SRB	Stefan Šapić
70	FW	SRB	Aleksa Janković
72	FW	SEN	Ibrahima Mame N'Diaye
77	MF	BIH	Stefan Kovač
80	MF	SRB	Nikola Čolić
86	DF	MNE	Bojan Roganović
88	MF	SRB	Jovan Lukić
—	MF	SRB	Luka Adžić
—	FW	SRB	Đorđe Ivanović

=== Players with multiple nationalities ===
- (Bosnia and Herzegovina) (Serbia) Stefan Kovač

=== Out on loan ===
Note: Flags indicate national team as defined under FIFA eligibility rules; some limited exceptions apply. Players may hold more than one non-FIFA nationality.

No.	Pos.	Nation	Player
—	MF	SRB	Aleksandar Đorđević (at Železničar Pančevo)
—	MF	SRB	Dario Grgić (at BASK)

No.	Pos.	Nation	Player
—	FW	MNE	Bojica Nikčević (at Novi Pazar)
—	FW	SRB	Milutin Vidosavljević (at Radnički 1923)

=== Club Friendlies ===
27 June 2021 Friendly	(Slovenia) Radomlje	0 - 1	(Serbia) Čukarički	Radomlje
18:30		Report		Stadium: Športni park Radomlje

1 July 2021 Friendly	(Russia) Arsenal Tula	1 - 3	(Serbia) Čukarički	Seeboden
18:00		Report		Stadium: Sportarena Seeboden

4 July 2021 Friendly	(Slovenia) Olimpija	1 - 2	(Serbia) Čukarički
18:30		Report

7 July 2021 Friendly	(Serbia) Čukarički	1 - 1	(Israel) Ashdod
20:00		Report

=== Serbian SuperLiga ===
==== Results summary ====
Overall								Home						Away					
Pld	W	D	L	GF	GA	GD	Pts	W	D	L	GF	GA	GD	W	D	L	GF	GA	GD
37	15	15	7	54	34	+20	60	8	9	2	30	13	+17	7	6	5	24	21	+3

Last updated: 19 May 2022.

===== Results by round =====
Round	1	2	3	4	5	6	7	8	9	10	11	12	13	14	15	16	17	18	19	20	21	22	23	24	25	26	27	28	29	30
Ground	H	A	H	A	H	A	H	A	H	A	H	A	H	H	A	A	H	A	H	A	H	A	H	A	H	A	H	A	A	H
Result	W	D	W	L	D	W	L	D	W	W	D	W	D	W	L	D	D	W	W	D	W	L	W	W	W	D	D	W	D	D
Position	3	3	3	3	3	3	3	3	3	3	3	3	3	3	3	3	3	3	3	3	3	3	3	3	3	3	3	3	3	3

Updated to match(es) played on 10 April 2022. Source: worldfootball
A = Away; H = Home; W = Win; D = Draw; L = Loss

==== Matches ====
16 July 2021 1	Čukarički	2 - 1	Voždovac	Belgrade
17:55 CEST	Kajević (yellow card) 15'; Jovanović 43' 70'; Tanasijević (yellow card) 57'	Report	Stanisavljević (red card) 8'; Milojević 15'	Stadium: Čukarički Stadium; Attendance: 500; Referee: (Serbia) Momčilo Marković

1 August 2021 3	Čukarički	2 - 1	Metalac GM	Belgrade
18:55 CEST	Rogan (yellow card) 9'; Mijailović (yellow card) 42'; Jovanović 45+1'; Savić 53'	Report	Srđan Nikolić (yellow card) 17'; Kokir (yellow card) 24'; Šarić 76'	Stadium: Čukarički Stadium; Attendance: 700; Referee: (Serbia) Novak Simović

8 August 2021 4	Kolubara	3 - 1	Čukarički	Lazarevac
18:55 CEST	Đenić (yellow card) 19'; Đuranović 30' 80'; Mladenović 50'; Dejan Stanivuković (yellow card) 84'	Report	Jovanović 24'; Lukić (yellow card) 38'; Bojica Nikčević (yellow card) 61'; Campbell (yellow card) 78'	Stadium: Kolubara Stadium; Attendance: 1,000; Referee: (Serbia) Milan Mitić

15 August 2021 5	Čukarički	0 - 0	Radnički Niš	Belgrade
18:30 CEST	Lukić (yellow card) 24'; Drezgić (yellow card) 72'	Report	Pejović (yellow card) 49'; Kasalica (yellow card) 62'	Stadium: Čukarički Stadium; Referee: (Serbia) Srđan Jovanović

21 August 2021 6	Radnički Kragujevac	0 - 3	Čukarički	Kragujevac
16:55 CEST	Mirić (yellow card) 6'; Damjanac (yellow card) 60'; Nemanja Dragutinovic (yellow card) 81'; Stefan Filipovic (yellow card) 90+1'	Report	Jovanović 21'; Rogan (yellow card) 29'; N'Diaye 41'; Savić 46'	Stadium: Čika Dača Stadium; Attendance: 4,000; Referee: (Serbia) Nenad Minaković

29 August 2021 7	Čukarički	1 - 2	Red Star Belgrade	Belgrade
18:55 CEST	Jovanović (yellow card) 41' (goal) 89'; Tanasijević (yellow card) 58'; Drezgić (yellow card) 87'	Report	Pavkov 40'; Rodić (yellow card) 47'; Katai 57'	Stadium: Čukarički Stadium; Referee: (Serbia) Nenad Minaković

12 September 2021 8	Mladost Lučani	0 - 0	Čukarički	Lučani
19:00 CEST	Cvetković (yellow card) 2'; Jovanović (yellow card) 11'; Lazar Selenić (yellow card) 36'	Report	Savić (yellow card) 36'; Bojan Roganović (yellow card) 73' (yellow-red card) 88'; Kovač (yellow card) 90+2'	Stadium: Stadion FK Mladost; Attendance: 200; Referee: (Serbia) Lazar Lukić

18 September 2021 9	Čukarički	2 - 1	Spartak Subotica	Belgrade
16:00 CEST	Jovanović 15'; Ergelaš (yellow card) 51'; Nemanja Tošić (yellow card) 60'; Ivančević 62' (o.g.); Kovač (yellow card) 78'	Report	Andrej Todoroski 34'; Srećković (yellow card) 70'	Stadium: Čukarički Stadium; Attendance: 200; Referee: (Serbia) Milan Mitić

22 September 2021 10	Napredak	1 - 2	Čukarički	Kruševac
17:30 CEST	Marjanović 58'; Tomić (yellow card) 69'	Report	Lukić 12'; Jovanović (yellow card) 64' (goal) 71'	Stadium: Mladost Stadium; Attendance: 1,000; Referee: (Serbia) Jovan Šegrt

27 September 2021 11	Čukarički	1 - 1	Radnik Surdulica	Belgrade
20:00 CEST	Kajević 27'; Ergelaš (yellow card) 78'; Mijailović (yellow card) 79'; Stevanović (yellow card) 90+1'	Report	Miloš Spasić 16'; Radmanovac (yellow card) 18'; Subotić (yellow card) 60'; Davor Nedeljković (yellow card) 73'; Mihailo Oreščanin (yellow card) 79'; Lukić (yellow card) 83'; Stefan Ranđelović (yellow card) 89'	Stadium: Čukarički Stadium; Attendance: 300; Referee: (Serbia) Marko Srećković

2 October 2021 12	Bačka Topola	1 - 2	Čukarički	Bačka Topola
16:00 CEST	Ratkov 47'; Tomanović (yellow card) 57'	Report	Čolović 38'; Mijailović (yellow card) 39'; Kovačević (yellow card) 61'; Ergelaš (yellow card) 77'; Kajević 68' (pen.)	Stadium: TSC Arena; Referee: (Serbia) Milan Mitić

16 October 2021 13	Čukarički	1 - 1	Vojvodina	Belgrade
18:00 CEST	Kovač (yellow card) 51'; Nemanja Tošić 66'	Report	Mrkaić 45'	Stadium: Čukarički Stadium; Referee: (Serbia) Andrija Stojanović

22 October 2021 14	Čukarički	6 - 1	Proleter Novi Sad	Belgrade
18:00 CEST	Nemanja Tošić 4' (yellow card) 49'; Rakonjac 31' 59'; Kajević (yellow card) 38' (goal) 51' (pen.); Mijailović (yellow card) 45'; Šapić 62'; Baić 74'	Report	Evandro 33'	Stadium: Čukarički Stadium; Attendance: 500; Referee: (Serbia) Stanko Ostraćanin

31 October 2021 15	Partizan	2 - 0	Čukarički	Belgrade
18:30 CEST	Vujačić 33'; Živković 45+3'	Report	Kovačević (yellow card) 45+1'; N'Diaye (yellow card) 70'	Stadium: Partizan Stadium; Attendance: 3,000; Referee: (Serbia) Milan Stefanović

5 November 2021 16	Voždovac	1 - 1	Čukarički	Belgrade
16:00 CET	Milosavljević (yellow card) 65'; Milović 68' (yellow card) 90+2'	Report	N'Diaye 7'; Šapić (yellow card) 35'; Mijailović (yellow card) 80'	Stadium: Voždovac Stadium; Referee: (Serbia) Novak Simović

18 November 2021 2	Novi Pazar	2 - 2	Čukarički	Novi Pazar
15:00 CET	Nemanja Kojčić (yellow card) 10'; Aganspahić 30' (pen.) (yellow card) 90+3'; Mladenović 45+2'; Kiković (yellow card) 63'; Vujanac (yellow card) 79'; Lončar (yellow card) 81'; Zimonjić (yellow card) 82'	Report		Stadium: Novi Pazar City Stadium; Referee: (Serbia)

=== Championship Round ===
==== Results by round ====
Round	1
Ground	
Result	
Position	

A = Away; H = Home; W = Win; D = Draw; L = Loss

=== Serbian Cup ===
27 October 2021 Round of 32	Loznica	1 - 0	Čukarički	Klupci
14:30 CEST	Nikola Milinković 31'; Dragiša Komarčević (yellow card) 66'; Miloš Spasenović (yellow card) 82'; Nikolić (yellow card) 84'; Lazar Ivić (yellow card) 88'	Report	Stevanović (yellow card) 90+1'	Stadium: FK Radnički Stadium; Attendance: 800; Referee: (Serbia) David Matić

=== Second Qualifying Round ===
21 July 2021 First Leg	(Serbia) Čukarički	0 - 0	(Azerbaijan) Sumgayit	Belgrade
20:00 CEST	Mijailović (yellow card) 60'; Bojan Roganović (yellow card) 70'; Janković (yellow card) 90'	Report	Turabov (yellow card) 90+1'; Bayramov (yellow card) 90+3'	Stadium: Čukarički Stadium; Attendance: 1,200; Referee: (Switzerland) Urs Schnyder

29 July 2021 Second Leg	(Azerbaijan) Sumgayit	0 - 2 (0 – 2 agg.)	(Serbia) Čukarički	Sumgait
19:00	Mustafayev (yellow card) 55'	Report	N'Diaye 10' (yellow card) 34'; Docić 16' (pen.); Stevanović (yellow card) 59'; Tanasijević (yellow card) 81'; Jovanović (yellow card) 90+6'	Stadium: Kapital Bank Arena; Attendance: 750; Referee: (Denmark) Jørgen Burchardt

=== Third Qualifying Round ===
5 August 2021 First Leg	(Serbia) Čukarički	3 - 1	(Sweden) Hammarby	Belgrade
21:00 CEST	Jovanović 22'; Bojan Roganović (yellow card) 39'; Docić 40' 52' (yellow card) 90+2'; Šapić (yellow card) 64'; Drezgić (yellow card) 90'	Report	Mohanad Jeahze (yellow card) 15'; Ludwigson 25'; Andersen (yellow card) 31'; Fjóluson (yellow card) 69'; Swedberg (yellow card) 84'; Bojanić (yellow card) 88'	Stadium: Partizan Stadium; Attendance: 1,496; Referee: (Ukraine) Yevhenii Aranovskiy

12 August 2021 Second Leg	(Sweden) Hammarby	5 - 1 (6 – 4 agg.)	(Serbia) Čukarički	Stockholm
18:45 CEST	Mohanad Jeahze 12'; Selmani 26' 72'; Paulsen 44'; Rodić (yellow card) 61'; Swedberg 67'; Andersen (yellow card) 75'	Report	Tanasijević (yellow card) 25'; Šapić (yellow card) 45+1'; N'Diaye 64'	Stadium: Tele2 Arena; Attendance: 7,651; Referee: (Netherlands) Dennis Higler
