= Predrag Milošević =

Predrag Milošević may refer to:

- Predrag Milošević (composer), Serbian composer and musician
- Predrag Milošević (politician, born 1985)
- Predrag Milošević (Vojvodina politician)
