= 2015–16 Serbian First League =

Serbian First League
- Season: 2015–16
- Champions: Napredak
- Promoted: Napredak, Bačka
- Relegated: Sloga, Donji Srem, Loznica, Radnički
- Matches: 240
- Goals: 526 (2.19 per match)
- Top goalscorer: Nenad Lukić (Bežanija), 15 goals
- Biggest home win: Bačka 6–0 Donji Srem (14 May 2016)
- Biggest away win: Dinamo 0–5 Inđija (3 April 2016)
- Highest scoring: Bačka 6–2 BSK (12 September 2015)

The Serbian First League (Serbian: Prva liga Srbije) is the second-highest football league in Serbia. The league is operated by the Serbian FA. 16 teams compete in the league for the 2015–16 season. Two teams were promoted to the Serbian SuperLiga. Four teams were relegated to the Serbian League, the third-highest division overall in the Serbian football league system. The season begun in August 2015 and ended in May 2016.

== 2015–16 teams ==
Location of teams in the 2015–16 Serbian First league

Team	City	Stadium	Capacity	Kit manufacturer	Shirt Sponsor
Bačka	Bačka Palanka	Stadion Slavko Maletin Vava	5,500	Saller	Podunavlje a.d.
Bežanija	Belgrade	Stadion FK Bežanija	4,000	Sportika	
BSK	Borča	Vizelj Park	2,500	Hummel	
Dinamo Vranje	Vranje	Stadion Yumco	4,000	Joma	
Donji Srem	Pećinci	SC Suvača	4,000	Joma	Industrija mesa Đurđević
ČSK	Čelarevo	Stadion Pivare	3,000	Joma	Lav pivo
Zemun	Zemun, Belgrade	Zemun Stadium	10,000	Umbro	
Inđija	Inđija	Stadion FK Inđija	4,500	Erima	
Kolubara	Lazarevac	Stadion FK Kolubara	2,000	Erima	Lasta Beograd
Loznica	Loznica	Stadion Lagator	4,000	Erima	
Napredak	Kruševac	Mladost Stadium	10,331	Puma	Delta City
Proleter	Novi Sad	Stadion Slana Bara	2,000	Joma	Elektrovojvodina d.o.o.
Radnički Kragujevac	Kragujevac	Stadion Čika Dača	15,100	Jako	
Sinđelić	Belgrade	Stadion FK Sinđelić	1,500	Cvetex	Rubikon
Sloboda Užice	Užice	Užice City Stadium	12,000	Jako	UNITRAG
Sloga	Petrovac	Stadion FK Sloga	2,000	NAAI	Premier Kladionica

== League table ==
Pos	Team	Pld	W	D	L	GF	GA	GD	Pts	Promotion or relegation
1	Napredak Kruševac (C, P)	30	21	5	4	48	26	+22	68	Promotion to the Serbian SuperLiga
2	Bačka (P)	30	16	8	6	52	30	+22	56	Promotion to the Serbian SuperLiga
3	ČSK	30	14	6	10	28	19	+9	48	
4	Inđija	30	12	9	9	46	28	+18	45	
5	Bežanija	30	11	10	9	35	27	+8	43	
6	Sinđelić Beograd	30	11	9	10	32	25	+7	42	
7	Kolubara	30	11	9	10	29	28	+1	42	
8	Proleter Novi Sad	30	9	13	8	32	29	+3	40	
9	BSK Borča	30	11	7	12	32	38	−6	40	
10	Zemun	30	10	9	11	29	33	−4	39	
11	Sloga Petrovac (Note: Due to financial difficulties, Sloga's application for 2016–17 season was rejected. On emergency meeting in the Football Association of Serbia on 18 July 2016, it was announced that Sloboda Užice will be sparred of relegation.) (R)	30	10	9	11	34	36	−2	39	Relegation to the Serbian League
12	Dinamo Vranje	30	11	5	14	27	38	−11	38	
13	Sloboda Užice	30	8	11	11	35	34	+1	35	
14	Donji Srem (R)	30	8	10	12	24	38	−14	34	Relegation to the Serbian League
15	Loznica (R)	30	7	10	13	21	35	−14	31	Relegation to the Serbian League
16	Radnički Kragujevac (R)	30	2	6	22	23	63	−40	12	Relegation to the Serbian League

Source: Football Association of Serbia (in Serbian)
Rules for classification: 1) points; 2) head-to-head points; 3) head-to-head goal difference; 4) head-to-head goals scored; 5) goal difference; 6) number of goals scored.
(C) Champions; (P) Promoted; (R) Relegated

== Results ==
Home \ Away	BBP	BEŽ	BSK	DVR	DSR	ČSK	ZEM	INĐ	KOL	LOZ	NAP	PNS	RKR	SIN	SUŽ	SPM
Bačka		2–2	6–2	2–0	6–0	1–0	2–0	2–1	2–0	3–1	4–3	2–1	4–1	0–2	1–1	3–0
Bežanija	1–1		1–2	3–0	0–0	0–0	1–0	1–0	2–0	2–0	0–2	2–1	1–0	0–0	1–1	2–2
BSK Borča	0–0	1–3		0–2	1–1	1–0	1–2	1–1	1–0	1–1	1–0	0–1	5–2	2–1	1–0	0–0
Dinamo Vranje	2–0	1–0	2–0		3–0	0–0	1–3	0–5	2–0	1–0	1–2	1–0	1–1	2–0	0–1	1–1
Donji Srem	2–1	0–0	0–2	1–0		1–0	3–0	1–1	0–1	0–0	2–2	1–2	2–0	2–2	0–0	0–2
ČSK	2–0	1–0	0–1	1–0	3–0		1–0	1–1	2–0	3–0	0–1	0–0	2–0	2–1	2–0	1–0
Zemun	2–1	0–0	0–1	0–0	0–1	0–1		1–0	0–0	3–1	0–1	1–0	3–0	0–1	1–1	2–1
Inđija	2–2	1–0	4–0	3–0	3–0	4–0	4–0		0–0	0–0	0–1	1–1	2–1	3–2	1–0	1–1
Kolubara	0–0	2–0	1–0	1–0	0–1	2–1	2–2	1–2		2–0	3–1	2–0	1–0	1–2	2–1	0–1
Loznica	0–1	0–2	1–0	3–1	1–1	1–1	1–1	2–0	0–0		0–0	1–1	1–0	1–0	1–2	2–1
Napredak Kruševac	2–0	3–2	3–1	1–3	2–1	2–1	1–1	1–1	1–0	1–0		1–0	3–1	1–0	2–1	2–0
Proleter Novi Sad	0–1	3–1	1–1	3–0	1–0	0–0	3–3	3–2	2–2	1–1	0–0		1–0	1–0	0–0	3–1
Radnički Kragujevac	1–1	0–4	0–3	1–1	0–1	0–1	1–2	2–0	2–2	0–2	2–3	1–1		1–3	1–1	2–1
Sinđelić Beograd	0–1	1–1	1–0	3–0	1–0	0–2	0–0	1–0	0–0	3–0	0–2	2–0	3–0		1–1	1–1
Sloboda Užice	2–2	2–3	1–0	1–2	1–1	2–0	3–1	1–2	2–3	2–0	0–1	1–1	5–1	1–1		1–0
Sloga Petrovac	0–1	1–0	3–3	2–0	3–2	1–0	0–1	2–1	1–1	2–0	1–3	1–1	3–2	0–0	2–0	

Source: Prva liga
Legend: Blue = home team win; Yellow = draw; Red = away team win.

== Top goalscorers ==
Source: Prva liga official website

Pos	Scorer	Team	Goals
1	(Serbia) Nenad Lukić	Bežanija	15
2	(Serbia) Dejan Georgijević	Inđija	14
3	(Serbia) Bojan Beljić	Napredak	12
4	(Serbia) Dejan Đorđević	Sloboda	10
4	(Bosnia and Herzegovina) Mladen Galić	Bačka	10
4	(Senegal) Ibrahima Mame N'Diaye	Napredak	10
4	(Serbia) Aleksa Vukanović	ČSK	10
8	(Serbia) Veseljko Trivunović	Bačka	9
9	(Serbia) Jordan Jovanović	BSK	8
9	(Serbia) Milan Stavrić	Dinamo	8

=== Hat-tricks ===
Player	For	Against	Result	Date
(Serbia) Jordan Jovanović	BSK	Radnički	5–2	5 September 2015
(Serbia) Milorad Balabanović	Bačka	BSK	6–2	12 September 2015
(Serbia) Bojan Beljić	Napredak	BSK	3–1	15 November 2015
(Serbia) Dejan Georgijević^{4}	Inđija	Dinamo	5–0	3 April 2016
(Serbia) Dejan Đorđević	Sloboda	Radnički	5–1	28 April 2016
(Serbia) Milanko Rašković	Kolubara	Napredak	3–1	4 May 2016
(Bosnia and Herzegovina) Mladen Galić	Bačka	Donji Srem	6–0	14 May 2016

Note

^{4} Player scored 4 goals
