= Milan Savić =

Milan Savić may refer to:

- Milan Savić (footballer, born 1994), Serbian football defender
- Milan Savić (footballer, born 2000), Bosnian football winger
- Milan Savić (author) (1845–1930), Serbian writer and literary critic
- Milan Savić (politician), Serbian politician
