= 2024–25 Randers FC season =

Randers FC
2024–25 season
- Manager: Rasmus Bertelsen
- Stadium: Randers Stadium
- Danish Superliga: Pre-season
- Danish Cup: Pre-season

The 2024–25 season is the 22nd season in the history of Randers FC, and the club's 13th consecutive season in the Danish Superliga. In addition to the domestic league, the team is scheduled to participate in the Danish Cup.

== Transfers ==
=== In ===
Pos.	Player	Transferred from	Fee	Date	Source
DF	(Denmark) Nikolas Dyhr	(United States) St. Louis City SC	Undisclosed	1 July 2024	
FW	(France) Florian Danho	(Switzerland) Stade Lausanne Ouchy	€500,000	1 July 2024	
GK	(Australia) Paul Izzo	(Australia) Melbourne Victory	Undisclosed	9 July 2024	
DF	(Denmark) Christian Østergaard	(Germany) Wolfsburg U19	Free	9 July 2024	
MF	(Jamaica) Norman Campbell	(Serbia) FK Vojvodina	Undisclosed	11 July 2024	
FW	(Australia) Mohamed Toure	(France) Stade Reims II	Undisclosed	18 July 2024	
MF	(Ghana) Abdul Hakim Sulemana	(France) Lyon	Undisclosed	27 July 2024	

=== Out ===
Pos.	Player	Transferred to	Fee	Date	Source
FW	(Denmark) Marvin Egho	(Denmark) AC Horsens	End of contract	1 July 2024	
MF	(Denmark) Mads Albæk	(Germany) SC Weiche Flensburg 08	End of contract	1 July 2024	
FW	(Denmark) Muamer Brajanac	(Norway) Vålerenga	Undisclosed	17 July 2024	

== Friendlies ==
=== Pre-season ===
The pre-season began on 19 June.

29 June 2024 Friendly	Nordsjælland (Denmark)	3–2	(Denmark) Randers	Farum
14:00	Iloski 19'; Nygren 78', 90+1'	Report	Agyiri 48', 64'	Stadium: Farum Park Bane 6

3 July 2024 Friendly	Viborg FF (Denmark)	3–1	(Denmark) Randers	Viborg
13:00	Serginho 12'; Renato Júnior 14'; Themsen 75'	Report	Bonde 109'
Note: 3 x 40 minutes

10 July 2024 Friendly	Randers (Denmark)	2–1	(Poland) Arka Gdynia	Randers
17:00 UTC+2	Isah 26'; Danho 76'	Report	Sobczak 15'	Stadium: Randers Stadium

13 July 2024 Friendly	Hansa Rostock (Germany)	1–3	(Denmark) Randers	Rostock
14:30	Rossipal 27'	Report	Danho 8'; Odey 46', 73'	Stadium: Volksstadion

== Competitions ==
=== Overall record ===
Competition	First match	Last match	Starting round	Record							
Competition	First match	Last match	Starting round	Pld	W	D	L	GF	GA	GD	Win %
Superliga	21 July 2024		Matchday 1	1	1	0	0	3	2	+1	100.00
Danish Cup				0	0	0	0	0	0	+0	—
Total				1	1	0	0	3	2	+1	100.00

Last updated: 21 July 2024
Source: Soccerway

=== Superliga ===
==== League table ====
Pos	Team	Pld	W	D	L	GF	GA	GD	Pts	Qualification
2	Copenhagen	22	11	8	3	38	24	+14	41	Qualification for the Championship round
3	AGF	22	9	9	4	42	23	+19	36	Qualification for the Championship round
4	Randers	22	9	8	5	39	28	+11	35	Qualification for the Championship round
5	Nordsjælland	22	10	5	7	39	36	+3	35	Qualification for the Championship round
6	Brøndby	22	8	9	5	42	32	+10	33	Qualification for the Championship round

Source: Danish Football Association (in Danish), Soccerway
Rules for classification: 1) Points; 2) Goal difference; 3) Goals scored; 4) Away goals scored; 5) Play-off (played on neutral ground if determining teams for different rounds); 6) Draw.

Pos	Team	Pld	W	D	L	GF	GA	GD	Pts	
2	Midtjylland	32	19	5	8	64	42	+22	62	Qualification for the UEFA Europa League second qualifying round
3	Brøndby	32	13	12	7	58	46	+12	51	Qualification for the UEFA Conference League second qualifying round
4	Randers	32	13	9	10	57	50	+7	48	Qualification for the European play-off match
5	Nordsjælland	32	13	7	12	53	56	−3	46	
6	AGF	32	10	10	12	53	46	+7	40	

Source: Danish Football Association (in Danish), Soccerway
Rules for classification: 1) Points; 2) Goal difference; 3) Goals scored; 4) Away goals scored; 5) Play-off (played on neutral ground if determining teams for different rounds); 6) Draw.

Pos	Team	Pld	W	D	L	GF	GA	GD	Pts	
1	Silkeborg (O)	32	13	10	9	56	41	+15	49	Qualification for the European play-off match
2	Viborg	32	12	11	9	57	50	+7	47	
3	Sønderjyske	32	10	7	15	47	64	−17	37	
4	Vejle	32	7	7	18	37	64	−27	28	
5	Lyngby (R)	32	5	12	15	26	43	−17	27	Relegation to 1st Division
6	AaB (R)	32	5	9	18	34	67	−33	24	Relegation to 1st Division

Source: Danish Football Association (in Danish), Soccerway
Rules for classification: 1) Points; 2) Goal difference; 3) Goals scored; 4) Away goals scored; 5) Play-off (played on neutral ground if determining teams for different rounds); 6) Draw.
(O) Play-off winners; (R) Relegated

==== Results summary ====
Overall								Home						Away					
Pld	W	D	L	GF	GA	GD	Pts	W	D	L	GF	GA	GD	W	D	L	GF	GA	GD
17	8	6	3	31	19	+12	30	4	2	2	14	8	+6	4	4	1	17	11	+6

Last updated: 1 December 2024.
Source: Soccerway

==== Results by round ====
Round	1	2	3	4	5	6	7	8	9	10	11	12	13	14	15	16	17	18	19
Ground	A	H	A	H	H	A	H	A	H	A	H	A	H	A	A	H	A	H	A
Result	W	W	D	L	L	D	W	D	D	D	D	W	W	W	L	W	W		
Position	3	1	3	7	7	7	6	6	6	7	7	7	4	4	5	4	3		

Updated to match(es) played on 1 December 2024. Source: worldfootball.net
A = Away; H = Home; W = Win; D = Draw; L = Loss

==== Matches ====
The match schedule was released on 7 June 2024.

21 July 2024 1	Vejle	2–3	Randers	Vejle
16:00	Kolinger (yellow card) 25'; Onugkha 37', 87'; Velkov (yellow card) 69'		Enggård 53'; Bolkan Nordli 59' (pen.); Lauenborg (yellow card) 76'; Bany Odeh 90+2'	Stadium: Vejle Stadium; Referee: Jacob Karlsen

28 July 2024 2	Randers	3–1	Viborg	Randers
14:00	Danho 27'; Campbell 45+4'; Olsen (yellow card) 63'; Toure 75'	Report	Grønning 39' (yellow card) 50'; Anyembe (yellow card) 77'	Stadium: Randers Stadium; Attendance: 5,695; Referee: (Denmark) Sandi Putros

4 August 2024 3	Copenhagen	1–1	Randers	Copenhagen
16:00 CET	Diks (yellow card) 27'; Elyounoussi 64'	Report	Lauenborg 10'; Danho (red card) 27'; Dammers (yellow card) 30'	Stadium: Parken Stadium; Attendance: 25,819; Referee: (Denmark) Michael Tykgaard

11 August 2024 4	Randers	0–2	Silkeborg	Randers
14:00 CET		Report	Pedro Ganchas (yellow card) 27'; Orazov 52'; Bakiz 66'; McCowatt (yellow card) 84'	Stadium: Randers Stadium; Attendance: 4,558; Referee: (Denmark) Simon Rasmussen

18 August 2024 5	Randers	1–2	Sønderjyske	Randers
14:00 CET	Nordli 24'; Laurits Pedersen (yellow card) 90+3'	Report	Agger 28' (yellow card) 30' (goal) 48'; Vinderslev (yellow card) 46'; Soulas (yellow card) 49'	Stadium: Randers Stadium; Attendance: 4,261; Referee: (Denmark) Morten Krogh Hansen

25 August 2024 6	Brøndby	2–2	Randers	Brøndbyvester
18:00 CET	Divković 72'; Kvistgaarden 82'; Wass (yellow card) 87'	Report	Campbell 34'; Björkengren (yellow card) 49'; Hansen (yellow card) 79'; Høegh 88'	Stadium: Brøndby Stadium; Attendance: 21,797; Referee: (Denmark) Lasse Graagaard

1 September 2024 7	Randers	1–0	AaB	Randers
18:00 CET	Campbell (yellow card) 32'; Nordli 39'; Odey (yellow card) 90+4'	Report	Arnórsson (yellow card) 31'; Davidsen (yellow card) 38'	Stadium: Randers Stadium; Attendance: 5,669; Referee: (Denmark) Aydin Uslu

16 September 2024 8	Nordsjælland	1–1	Randers	Farum
19:00 CET	Ankersen (yellow card) 82'; Tverskov 90+6'	Report	Tammer Bany (yellow card) 55'; Campbell 78'	Stadium: Right to Dream Park; Attendance: 3,158; Referee: (Denmark) Michael Tykgaard

22 September 2024 9	Randers	2–2	Midtjylland	Randers
14:00 CET	Campbell 16'; Nordli 45+3'; Dammers (yellow card) 89'	Report	Franculino Djú 19'; Osorio (red card) 65'; Bravo (yellow card) 86'; Şimşir 90+1' (pen.)	Stadium: Randers Stadium; Attendance: 5,808; Referee: (Denmark) Mads-Kristoffer Kristoffersen

28 September 2024 10	AGF	2–2	Randers	Aarhus
16:00 CET	Bech 25' (yellow card) 74'; Anderson (yellow card) 63'; Madsen 79'; Beijmo (yellow card) 90+2'; Andersen (yellow card) 90+9'	Report	Danho (yellow card) 4' (goal) 61'; Olsen (yellow card) 24'; Björkengren 44'; Campbell (yellow card) 68'; Dammers (yellow card) 74'; Rømer (yellow card) 90+5'; Nordli (yellow card) 90+9'	Stadium: Ceres Park; Attendance: 13,280; Referee: (Denmark) Jakob Sundberg

6 October 2024 11	Randers	1–1	Lyngby	Randers
14:00 CET	Olsen 40'	Report	Klassen (yellow card) 29'; Magnússon 66'; Hebo (yellow card) 88'	Stadium: Randers Stadium; Attendance: 6,251; Referee: (Denmark) Aydin Uslu

=== Danish Cup ===
4 September 2024 Second round	B 1913	0–10	Randers	Odense
17:00 CET	Mohammed Iddriss (yellow card) 26' (yellow-red card) 30'	Report	Odey 3' 10' 43'; Andersson (yellow card) 15'; Danho 17' 23' 45+3'; Abdul Hakim Sulemana (yellow card) 32' (goal) 56'; Toure 48' (pen.); Zandén (yellow card) 51'; Rømer 77'; Max Albæk 79'	Stadium: Campus Road; Referee: Jonas Bøgelund

25 September 2024 Third round	Brabrand IF	1–0	Randers	Brabrand
16:00 CET	Tobias Friis 37' (yellow card) 47'; Daniel Lundholm (yellow card) 45+1'; Rasmus Juul (yellow card) 74'; Tobias Olesen (yellow card) 84'	Report	Odey (yellow card) 38'	Stadium: Brabrand Stadion; Attendance: 1,040; Referee: Sandi Putros
