= Mladen Galić =

Serbian footballer

Personal information
- Date of birth: 9 October 1987 (age 39)
- Place of birth: Bosanski Novi, SFR Yugoslavia
- Height: 1.90 m (6 ft 3 in)
- Position: Forward

Senior career*
Years	Team	Apps	(Gls)
2005–2009	Metalac Futog		
2009–2010	Sopot	28	(5)
2010–2011	Sloga Temerin	23	(15)
2011–2012	Proleter Novi Sad	31	(2)
2012–2013	Pau FC	33	(8)
2013–2014	Banat Zrenjanin	15	(2)
2014–2015	SC Röthis	24	(21)
2015–2016	OFK Bačka	40	(11)
2017	OFK Odžaci	28	(15)
2018–2020	TSC	66	(12)
2020	Proleter Novi Sad	15	(0)
- * Club domestic league appearances and goals as of 31 January 2021

Mladen Galić (Serbian Cyrillic: Младен Галић; born 9 October 1987) is a Serbian footballer who plays as a forward.

== Career ==
Born in Bosanski Novi, SR Bosnia and Herzegovina, then still within Yugoslavia, now known as Novi Grad within Republika Srpska, Galić spent most of his career playing in Serbia. Initially he played third tier clubs such as Metalac Futog, Sopot and Sloga Temerin, before joining Proleter Novi Sad in 2011. After one season with Proleter playing in the Serbian First League (second tier), Galić moved to France and played with Pau FC in the 2012–13 CFA. Then he returned to Serbia and played with Banat Zrenjanin in the Serbian League Vojvodina, before moving to Austria in summer 2014 to play with SC Röthis. In summer 2015 he joined ambitious Serbian side OFK Bačka and achieved with them their historical first time promotion to the Serbian SuperLiga, after finishing second in the 2015–16 Serbian First League. Galić made his debut in the 2016–17 Serbian SuperLiga in the first-round game against powerhouse Partizan, a game which ended in a 0–0 draw.
