= Norman Campbell (footballer) =

Jamaican footballer (born 1999)

Personal information
- Full name: Norman Odale Campbell
- Date of birth: 24 November 1999 (age 26)
- Place of birth: Kingston, Jamaica
- Height: 1.78 m (5 ft 10 in)
- Position: Forward

Team information
- Current team: V-Varen Nagasaki
- Number: 11

Senior career*
Years	Team	Apps	(Gls)
2019–2021	Harbour View	29	(7)
2020–2021	→ Grafičar Beograd (loan)	12	(3)
2021–2022	Čukarički	13	(0)
2022–2023	Javor Ivanjica	41	(8)
2023–2024	Vojvodina	23	(2)
2024–2026	Randers	42	(9)
2026–	V-Varen Nagasaki	16	(2)

International career^{‡}
2020–	Jamaica	8	(0)
- * Club domestic league appearances and goals as of 11 August 2026 ‡ National team caps and goals as of 31 March 2026

Norman Odale Campbell (born 24 November 1999) is a Jamaican professional footballer who plays as a forward for Japanese J1 League club V-Varen Nagasaki and the Jamaica national team.

== Club career ==
=== Harbour View ===
Campbell trialed for Stoke City and almost signed for Udinese.

==== Loan to Grafičar ====
On 8 October 2020, Campbell signed with Serbian club Grafičar Beograd on loan from Harbour View. He made his professional debut with Grafičar in a 2–1 Serbian First League win over Budućnost Dobanovci on 26 October 2020.

=== Čukarički ===
On 11 July 2021, Campbell signed a three-year deal with Serbian SuperLiga club Čukarički.

=== Javor Ivanjica ===
Having failed to establish himself as a first 11 choice, after only one year of his contract with Čukarički, Campbell moved on a free transfer to Javor Ivanjica, signing a three-year deal with the club.

=== Vojvodina ===
On 15 September 2023, Campbell signed a three-year deal with Vojvodina, for an undisclosed fee.

=== Randers FC ===
On 11 July 2024, Danish Superliga club Randers FC confirmed that they had signed Campbell on a contract until June 2028.

=== V-Varen Nagasaki ===
In January 2026, Campbell joined Japanese J1 League club V-Varen Nagasaki.

== International career ==
Campbell debuted with the Jamaica national team in a 3–0 friendly loss to Saudi Arabia on 14 November 2020.

== Career statistics ==
=== Club ===
As of match played 7 December 2025

Appearances and goals by club, season and competition
Club	Season	League			National cup (Note: Includes Serbian Cup, Danish Cup)		Continental		Other		Total	
Club	Season	Division	Apps	Goals	Apps	Goals	Apps	Goals	Apps	Goals	Apps	Goals
Harbour View	2018–19	Jamaica Premier League	7	0	0	0	—		—		7	0
Harbour View	2019–20	Jamaica Premier League	22	0	0	0	—		—		22	0
Harbour View	Total		29	0	0	0	—		—		29	0
Grafičar	2020–21	Serbian First League	12	3	0	0	—		—		12	3
Čukarički	2021–22	Serbian SuperLiga	13	0	0	0	4 (Note: Appearances in UEFA Conference League)	0	—		17	0
Javor Ivanjica	2022–23	Serbian SuperLiga	35	7	1	0	—		—		36	7
Javor Ivanjica	2023–24	Serbian SuperLiga	6	1	—		—		—		6	1
Javor Ivanjica	Total		41	8	1	0	—		—		42	8
Vojvodina	2023–24	Serbian SuperLiga	23	2	4	0	—		—		27	2
Randers	2024–25	Danish Superliga	26	7	1	0	—		1 (Note: Appearance in Danish Superliga European play-offs)	0	28	7
Randers	2025–26	Danish Superliga	16	2	2	0	—		—		18	2
Randers	Total		42	9	3	0	—		1	0	46	9
V-Varen Nagasaki	2026–27	J1 League	0	0	0	0	—		0	0	0	0
Career total			160	22	8	0	4	0	1	0	173	22

=== International ===
As of match played 31 March 2026

Appearances and goals by national team and year
National team	Year	Apps	Goals
Jamaica	2020	2	0
Jamaica	2022	1	0
Jamaica	2024	4	0
Jamaica	2026	1	0
Total		8	0
