= Predrag Milošević (politician, born 1985) =

Serbian politician

Predrag Milošević (Serbian Cyrillic: Предраг Милошевић; born 1985) is a politician in Serbia. A member of the Serbian Progressive Party, he received a mandate to serve in the National Assembly of Serbia on 17 March 2021.

== Private career ==
Milošević is a mechanical technician working in computer construction. He lives in Paraćin.

== Politician ==
Milošević has been active with the Progressive Party's board in Paraćin and has served as president of the supervisory board of the municipality's general hospital. He received the two hundredth position on the Progressive Party's Aleksandar Vučić — For Our Children electoral list in the 2020 Serbian parliamentary election and missed direct election when the list won 188 out of 250 mandates. He was given a mandate on 17 March 2020 as a replacement for Milan Savić, who had resigned.
