= Jordan Jovanović =

Serbian footballer (born 1992)

Personal information
- Full name: Jordan Jovanović
- Date of birth: 27 January 1992 (age 34)
- Place of birth: Smederevska Palanka, SFR Yugoslavia
- Height: 1.80 m (5 ft 11 in)
- Position: Central midfielder

Team information
- Current team: Loznica
- Number: 21

Youth career
- OFK Beograd
- 2008–2011: BSK Borča

Senior career*
Years	Team	Apps	(Gls)
2010–2013	BSK Borča	30	(0)
2011	→ Lepušnica (loan)		
2013	Teleoptik	7	(1)
2014–2016	BSK Borča	56	(10)
2016–2017	Javor Ivanjica	14	(0)
2017	→ BSK Borča (loan)	13	(4)
2017	Mačva Šabac	9	(1)
2018	Radnički Pirot	14	(2)
2019	Apolonia Fier	10	(0)
2019-2022	Železničar Pančevo	58	(4)
2022-2023	Smederevo		
2023	Hajduk Kula		
2024	Kolubara	17	(1)
2024-	Loznica		
- * Club domestic league appearances and goals as of 18 July 2024

Jordan Jovanović (Serbian Cyrillic: Јордан Јовановић; born 27 January 1992) is a Serbian footballer, who plays as a midfielder for Loznica.
