= Dejan Đorđević =

Serbian footballer

Personal information
- Full name: Dejan Đorđević Škembo
- Date of birth: 20 September 1992 (age 34)
- Place of birth: Bajina Bašta, FR Yugoslavia
- Height: 1.86 m (6 ft 1 in)
- Position: Forward

Team information
- Current team: Sloga Bajina Bašta

Youth career
- Sloga Bajina Bašta

Senior career*
Years	Team	Apps	(Gls)
2011–2015	Sloga Bajina Bašta		
2015	Sloga Požega	15	(5)
2015–2016	Sloboda Užice	30	(10)
2016	Birkirkara	3	(0)
2017	Zemun	2	(0)
2017–2018	Sloboda Užice	26	(3)
2019	Vestri	3	(0)
2019–2021	Sloboda Užice		
2021–2022	Sloga Bajina Bašta		
2022	Budućnost Krušik		
2023	Sloga Bajina Bašta		
2023	Zlatibor Čajetina		
2024-	Sloga Bajina Bašta		
- * Club domestic league appearances and goals as of 12 July 2019

Dejan Đorđević (Serbian Cyrillic: Дејан Ђорђевић; also transliterated Dejan Djordjević; born 20 September 1992) is a Serbian footballer, who plays as a forward for Sloga Bajina Bašta.

== Club career ==
Đorđević started his senior career with Sloga Bajina Bašta in 2011. In his debut season for the first team, he collected 23 matches in the Serbian League West. Đorđević stayed with the club until 2015, and he also played for Sloga Požega for a period during the 2014–15 season. In the summer of 2015, Đorđević joined Sloboda Užice. Đorđević scored the first hat-trick in his professional career for Sloboda Užice in 24 fixture match of the 2015–16 Serbian First League season against Radnički Kragujevac, played on 28 April 2016. Scoring 10 goals on 30 played matches, Đorđević was nominated for the best player of the season, by the supporters' choice. Next summer he signed with Maltese Premier League side Birkirkara, where he noted 5 caps at all competitions for the first half-season. At the beginning of 2017, he returned to Serbia and joined FK Zemun. Later, in April of the same year he terminated the contract and left the club, making just 2 appearances as a back-up player. In the summer of 2017, Đorđević returned to Sloboda Užice.
