= Viktor Rogan =

Serbian football player

Personal information
- Date of birth: 12 December 2002 (age 23)
- Place of birth: Belgrade, FR Yugoslavia
- Height: 1.78 m (5 ft 10 in)
- Position: Right back

Team information
- Current team: Borac Banja Luka
- Number: 19

Youth career
- –2018: Partizan
- 2018–2021: Čukarički

Senior career*
Years	Team	Apps	(Gls)
2021–2025	Čukarički	67	(3)
2025–	Borac Banja Luka	32	(0)

International career
2018–2019	Serbia U17	8	(0)
2019	Serbia U18	2	(0)
2021	Serbia U19	3	(0)
2021	Serbia U20	1	(0)
2022–2023	Serbia U21	12	(0)
- * Club domestic league appearances and goals as of 20 September 2026

Viktor Rogan (Serbian Cyrillic: Виктор Роган; born 12 December 2002) is a Serbian professional footballer who plays as a right back for Bosnian Premier League club Borac Banja Luka.

== Career statistics ==
As of match played 20 September 2026

Appearances and goals by club, season and competition
Club	Season	League			National cup (Note: Includes Serbian Cup, Bosnian Cup)		Continental		Other		Total	
Club	Season	Division	Apps	Goals	Apps	Goals	Apps	Goals	Apps	Goals	Apps	Goals
Čukarički	2020–21	Serbian SuperLiga	1	0	—		—		—		1	0
Čukarički	2021–22	Serbian SuperLiga	13	0	1	0	—		—		14	0
Čukarički	2022–23	Serbian SuperLiga	22	1	5	0	2 (Note: Appearances in UEFA Conference League)	0	—		29	1
Čukarički	2023–24	Serbian SuperLiga	17	2	2	0	3	0	—		22	2
Čukarički	2024–25	Serbian SuperLiga	14	0	1	0	—		—		15	0
Čukarički	Total		67	3	9	0	5	0	—		81	3
Borac Banja Luka	2024–25	Bosnian Premier League	10	0	1	0	4	0	1 (Note: Appearance in the Bosnian Supercup)	0	16	0
Borac Banja Luka	2025–26	Bosnian Premier League	18	0	—		2 (Note: One appearance in UEFA Europa League, one appearance in UEFA Conference League)	0	—		20	0
Borac Banja Luka	2026–27	Bosnian Premier League	4	0	0	0	6 (Note: Two appearances in UEFA Champions League, four appearances in UEFA Conference League)	0	—		10	0
Borac Banja Luka	Total		32	0	1	0	12	0	1	0	46	0
Career total			99	3	10	0	17	0	1	0	127	3

== Honours ==
Borac Banja Luka

- Bosnian Premier League: 2025–26
