= Oliver Olsen =

Danish footballer (born 2000)

Personal information
- Date of birth: 13 August 2000 (age 26)
- Place of birth: Ribe, Denmark
- Height: 1.92 m (6 ft 4 in)
- Position: Right-back

Team information
- Current team: VfL Bochum
- Number: 13

Youth career
- Starup IF
- Esbjerg
- 2018–2019: Midtjylland

Senior career*
Years	Team	Apps	(Gls)
2017–2018	Esbjerg	0	(0)
2018–2023	Midtjylland	1	(0)
2021–2023	→ Fredericia (loan)	58	(5)
2023–2026	Randers	76	(4)
2026–	VfL Bochum	17	(0)

International career
2015–2016	Denmark U16	8	(0)
2016–2017	Denmark U17	14	(1)
2017–2018	Denmark U18	6	(0)
2018–2019	Denmark U19	10	(0)
- * Club domestic league appearances and goals as of 28 August 2026

Oliver Olsen (born 13 August 2000) is a Danish professional footballer who plays as right-back for 2. Bundesliga club VfL Bochum.

== Club career ==
=== Esbjerg fB ===
In 2004, at the age of 4, Olsen started playing football with his friends at a local club called Starup IF. Besides going to football he also went to handball and swimming. He later joined Esbjerg fB and in 2015, he signed his first contract with the club.

On 2 October 2017, Olsen sat on the bench for the first team of Esbjerg in a game against Vendsyssel FF in the Danish 1st Division.

=== FC Midtjylland ===
A half year before Olsens' contract with Esbjerg fB expired, on 1 February 2018, Esbjerg sold Olsen to FC Midtjylland where he began on their U-19 squad.

Olsen played the rest of the 2017–18 season with the U-19 squad. From the 2018–19 season, he was promoted to the first team squad. In November 2018, Olsen sat on the bench for the first team against his former club Esbjerg fB. One month later, on 16 December 2018, he made his professional debut for the club. Olsen started on the bench, replacing Rilwan Olanrewaju Hassan with one minute left of the game.

On 29 July 2021, Olsen was loaned out to Danish 1st Division club FC Fredericia for the 2021–22 season, to get some playing time.

=== Randers FC ===
On 31 July 2023, Olsen's contract was bought out by Randers FC, joining the club on a deal until June 2026.

=== VfL Bochum ===
On 2 February 2026, Olsen joined VfL Bochum in 2. Bundesliga on a four-and-a-half-year contract.

== Career statistics ==
=== Club ===
As of match played 28 August 2026

Appearances and goals by club, season and competition
Club	Season	League			Cup (Note: Includes Danish Cup, DFB-Pokal)		Continental		Other		Total	
Club	Season	Division	Apps	Goals	Apps	Goals	Apps	Goals	Apps	Goals	Apps	Goals
Esbjerg	2017–18	Danish 1st Division	0	0	0	0	—		0	0	0	0
Midtjylland	2018–19	Danish Superliga	1	0	0	0	0	0	—		1	0
Midtjylland	2020–21	Danish Superliga	0	0	0	0	0	0	—		0	0
Midtjylland	2021–22	Danish Superliga	0	0	0	0	0	0	—		0	0
Midtjylland	2022–23	Danish Superliga	0	0	0	0	0	0	0	0	0	0
Midtjylland	2023–24	Danish Superliga	0	0	0	0	0	0	—		0	0
Midtjylland	Total		1	0	0	0	0	0	0	0	1	0
Fredericia (loan)	2021–22	Danish 1st Division	28	3	4	0	—		—		32	3
Fredericia (loan)	2022–23	Danish 1st Division	30	2	2	0	—		—		32	2
Fredericia (loan)	Total		58	5	6	0	0	0	0	0	64	5
Randers	2023–24	Danish Superliga	28	1	2	0	—		1 (Note: Appearance(s) in Danish Superliga European play-off)	0	31	1
Randers	2024–25	Danish Superliga	31	1	1	0	—		1	0	33	1
Randers	2025–26	Danish Superliga	17	2	2	0	—		—		19	2
Randers	Total		76	4	5	0	0	0	2	0	83	4
VfL Bochum	2025–26	2. Bundesliga	14	0	—		—		—		14	0
VfL Bochum	2026–27	2. Bundesliga	3	0	1	0	—		—		4	0
VfL Bochum	Total		17	0	1	0	—		—		18	0
Career total			152	9	12	0	0	0	2	0	166	9
