= Dennis Stojković =

Serbian footballer

Personal information
- Date of birth: 3 August 2002 (age 24)
- Height: 1.77 m (5 ft 10 in)
- Position: Winger

Youth career
- Juventus
- Torino
- Chelsea
- –2018: LASK
- 2018–2019: Olimpija
- 2019–2020: Avellino
- 2021: Torino
- 2022: Rijeka

Senior career*
Years	Team	Apps	(Gls)
2020–2021	Partizan	7	(0)
2022–2023	Leotar	17	(1)
2024	Radnički Niš	3	(0)
2024	Chieri	5	(1)
2025	Chisola Calcio		

International career^{‡}
2021	Serbia U19	1	(0)
- * Club domestic league appearances and goals as of 28 November 2025 ‡ National team caps and goals as of 20 July 2021

Dennis Stojković (Serbian Cyrillic: Денис Стојковић; born 3 August 2002) is a Serbian professional footballer who plays as a midfielder.

== Career ==
=== Early career ===
Stojković spent his youth career with several of Europe's prominent clubs, including Juventus, Torino, and Chelsea.

=== Partizan ===
In August 2020, Stojković penned his first professional contract with Serbian club Partizan, signing a four-year deal. He made his professional debut for the club on 9 August 2020, coming on as a 78th-minute substitute for Seydouba Soumah in a 4–0 victory over Javor Ivanjica.

=== Torino ===
On 19 July 2021 he returned to Torino.

=== Rijeka ===
After he terminated contract with Torino at the end of 2021, he was announced as a new player of Rijeka on 1 April 2022 for which he debuted in a friendly match against Celje on 25 March 2022 scoring a goal.

In January 2025, Stojković joined Italian lower league side Chisola Calcio from Chieri.

In February 2025, he joined the Stallions, a Kings League Italy team. He played in the first split, the Kings Cup, and the second split, forming a superstar duo with Alessandro Colombo in the latter.

== Career statistics ==
=== Club ===
As of match played 7 April 2021

Appearances and goals by club, season and competition
Club	Season	League			Cup		Continental (Note: Includes UEFA Europa League)		Other		Total	
Club	Season	Division	Apps	Goals	Apps	Goals	Apps	Goals	Apps	Goals	Apps	Goals
Partizan	2020–21	Serbian SuperLiga	7	0	1	0	2	0	—	—	10	0
Career total			7	0	1	0	2	0	—	—	10	0
