= Stefan Šapić =

Serbian footballer

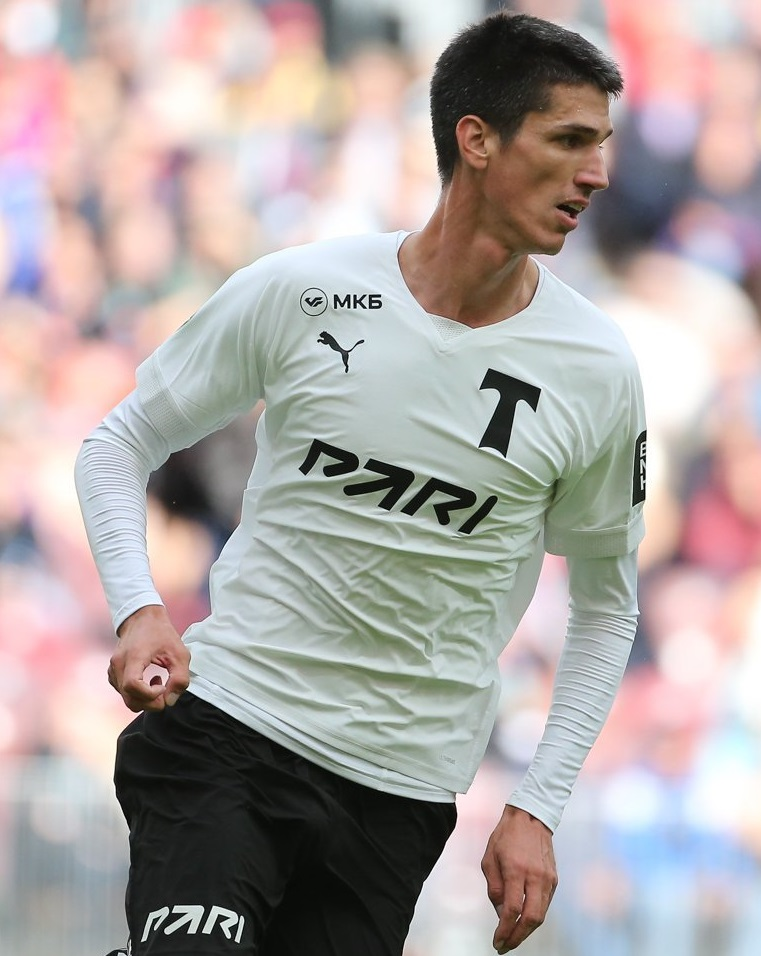
- Šapić with Torpedo Moscow in 2022

Personal information
- Date of birth: 26 February 1997 (age 29)
- Place of birth: Belgrade, FR Yugoslavia
- Height: 2.02 m (6 ft 8 in)
- Position: Centre-back

Team information
- Current team: IMT
- Number: 65

Youth career
- –2008: Žarkovo
- 2008–2009: Partizan
- 2009–2015: Čukarički

Senior career*
Years	Team	Apps	(Gls)
2016–2022	Čukarički	124	(11)
2016–2017	→ Sinđelić Beograd (loan)	26	(0)
2022–2023	Torpedo Moscow	5	(1)
2023–2024	Zvijezda 09	22	(0)
2024–2025	Hyderabad	22	(2)
2026–	IMT	14	(1)
- * Club domestic league appearances and goals as of 13 June 2026

Stefan Šapić (Serbian Cyrillic: Стефан Шапић; born 26 February 1997) is a Serbian professional footballer who plays as a centre-back for IMT.

== Club career ==
Šapić was licensed for the 2015–16 Serbian SuperLiga season, together with all other players of youth team, and he was given jersey number 65. Previously, Šapić was performed with Žarkovo. As soon as he signed his first professional contract with Čukarički, Šapić made his senior debut for Čukarički on 27 March 2016, in a postponed Serbian SuperLiga match of 26 fixture, against Mladost Lučani. After he won the Serbian youth league as a captain on youth team and qualified to the 2016–17 UEFA Youth League, Šapić was also with the first team, but without matches in the 2016–17 UEFA Europa League. In last days of the summer transfer window 2016, Šapić moved to Serbian First League side Sinđelić Beograd at dual registration until the end of 2016–17 season. He also extended a loan to Sinđelić deal until the end of 2017. Šapić made his first start for Čukarički in the 5th fixture of the 2018–19 Serbian SuperLiga campaign, in 1–0 victory over Proleter Novi Sad.

On 8 September 2022, Šapić signed with the Russian Premier League club Torpedo Moscow. In his second game for Torpedo on 17 September 2022, he scored the only goal of the game, 1–0 victory over CSKA Moscow to give Torpedo their first win since returning to the Premier League.

On 27 September 2023, Šapić signed with FK Zvijezda 09 in Premier League of Bosnia and Herzegovina on a contract until 30 June 2024.

== Career statistics ==
As of 27 November 2022

Appearances and goals by club, season and competition
Club	Season	League			Cup		Continental		Other		Total	
Club	Season	Division	Apps	Goals	Apps	Goals	Apps	Goals	Apps	Goals	Apps	Goals
Čukarički	2015–16	Serbian SuperLiga	1	0	0	0	0	0	—		1	0
Čukarički	2016–17	Serbian SuperLiga	0	0	0	0	0	0	—		0	0
Čukarički	2017–18	Serbian SuperLiga	0	0	0	0	—		—		0	0
Čukarički	2018–19	Serbian SuperLiga	28	2	1	0	—		—		29	2
Čukarički	2019–20	Serbian SuperLiga	29	4	3	0	4 (Note: Appearances in the UEFA Europa League)	0	—		36	4
Čukarički	2020–21	Serbian SuperLiga	35	4	3	0	—		—		38	4
Čukarički	2021–22	Serbian SuperLiga	31	1	0	0	4 (Note: Appearances in the UEFA Europa Conference League)	0	—		35	1
Čukarički	2022–23	Serbian SuperLiga	0	0	—		0	0	—		0	0
Čukarički	Total		124	11	7	0	8	0	—		139	11
Sinđelić Beograd (loan)	2016–17	Serbian First League	16	0	1	0	—		—		17	0
Sinđelić Beograd (loan)	2017–18	Serbian First League	10	0	1	0	—		—		11	0
Sinđelić Beograd (loan)	Total		26	0	2	0	—		—		28	0
Torpedo Moscow	2022–23	Premier League	5	1	5	0	—		—		10	1
Career total			155	12	14	0	8	0	—		177	12
