= SC Partizan-Teleoptik =

Association football training centre in Belgrade, Serbia

- Zemunelo
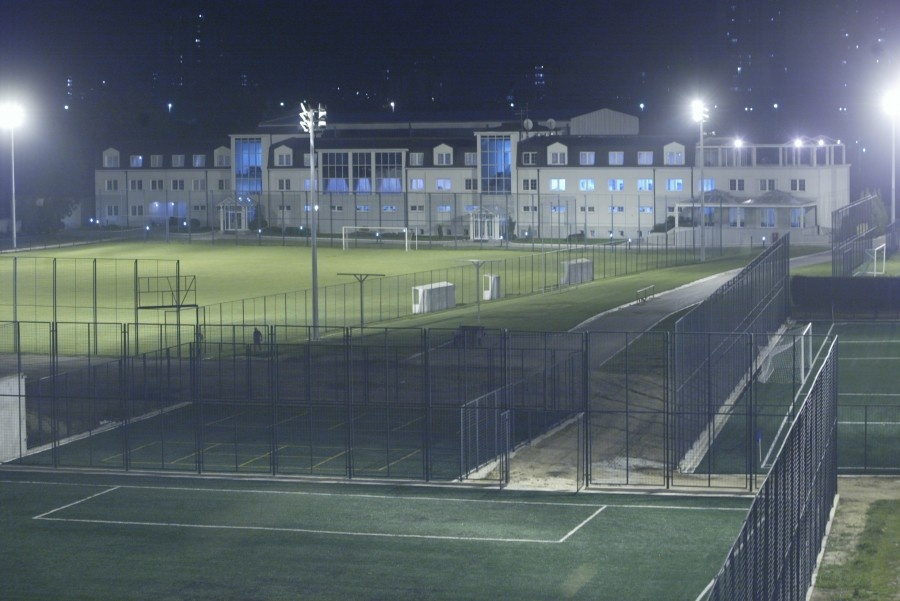
- SC Partizan-Teleoptik at night
- Interactive map of SC Partizan-Teleoptik
- Full name: Sports Centre Partizan-Teleoptik
- Address: Mostarska 12, 11 080 Zemun
- Location: Belgrade, Serbia
- Coordinates: 44.8524527°N 20.3824536°E
- Owner: Partizan
- Capacity: 2,000
- Type: Football training ground

Construction
- Opened: 28 May 1998; 28 years ago
- Renovated: 2004, 2025

Tenants
- Partizan (friendly matches); Teleoptik (official matches)

Website
- partizan.rs/vesti/sc-partizan-teleoptik

The Sports Centre Partizan-Teleoptik (Serbian: Спортски центар Партизан-Телеоптик / Sportski centar Partizan-Teleoptik), also known as Zemunelo (Serbian Cyrillic: Земунело; the name being composed to show the resemblance to A.C. Milan's sports centre, Milanello), is the football training ground of the Serbian SuperLiga club Partizan.

The complex is situated on the surface of almost 100,000 square metres, in the west part of Zemun municipality. It is a training base of all Partizan selections. Besides training, senior team of Partizan also use "Zemunelo" to play their friendly home matches.

== History ==
In early '90s, general secretary Žarko Zečević, sports director Nenad Bjeković, stadium director Aleksandar Stepanović and former coach Ivica Osim have decided to find the most ideal place to build a sports center. First location was near hotel "M" in Banjica, second in Zvezdara and third in Zemun municipality. Construction lasted for about 6 years. The sports centre was officially opened on 28 May 1998.

== Facilities ==
SC Partizan-Teleoptik consist of central building with total surface of 4,000 square metres, outdoor facilities, sport hall and parking lot. Inside the building there are facilities which include fitness centre with gym, physio and medical facilities, sauna and steam room and hydrotherapy pool, education facilities, media centre, kit room and laundry. There is also a restaurant, dining room, meeting room, administrative offices, and offices of Partizan and Teleoptik management. Building has 19 apartments for players and technical staff. Outdoor facilities include seven natural and two artificial grass pitches.

== Future ==
Further development will include boarding school for young players with 36 apartments, classroom, small pool and fitness centre.
