= Dušan Lalatović =

Serbian footballer

Personal information
- Date of birth: 29 November 1998 (age 27)
- Place of birth: Novi Sad, FR Yugoslavia
- Height: 2.00 m (6 ft 7 in)
- Positions: Centre back; defensive midfielder

Team information
- Current team: Digenis Morphou

Youth career
- Vojvodina Novi Sad

Senior career*
Years	Team	Apps	(Gls)
2016–2017	Budućnost Gložan		
2018	Radnički Niš	2	(0)
2018	→ Dinamo Vranje (loan)	7	(0)
2019	Slavia Sofia	0	(0)
2020	DAC Dunajská Streda	2	(0)
2020–2021	Partizan	0	(0)
2020	→ Teleoptik (loan)	0	(0)
2021–2022	Rad	29	(2)
2022	Ayia Napa	0	(0)
2023	Achyronas-Onisilos		
2023	PAEEK	11	(1)
2024-	Digenis Morphou		
- * Club domestic league appearances and goals as of 2 October 2021

Dušan Lalatović (Serbian Cyrillic: Душан Лалатовић; born 29 November 1998) is a Serbian footballer who plays as a defender for Digenis Morphou.

== Club career ==
After he spent his youth career with Vojvodina Novi Sad, Lalatović moved to Budućnost Gložan.

=== Radnički Niš ===
On 12 February 2018, Lalatović signed with Radnički Niš. Lalatović made his official debut for Radnički Niš in 26 fixture match of the 2017–18 Serbian SuperLiga season against Javor Ivanjica, played on 7 March 2018, replacing Miloš Petrović in 80 minute. During the transfer summer of 2018, Lalatović signed a one-season loan deal with Dinamo Vranje.

=== Radnički Zrenjanin ===
Ahead of the 2019-20 season, Lalatović joined FK Radnički Zrenjanin.

=== DAC Dunajská Streda ===
In January 2020, Lalatović had signed with DAC Dunajská Streda, who were third in the Fortuna Liga table. Lalatović had signed a 1,5 year contract with the club. Lalatović made his debut on 1 March 2020 in an away fixture against Žilina, coming on as a last minute substitute for Andrija Balić.

He played the second half of the 2023–24 Cypriot Second Division for PAEEK.

== Career statistics ==
=== Club ===
As of 1 February 2019

Appearances and goals by club, season and competition
Club	Season	League			Cup		Continental		Other		Total	
Club	Season	Division	Apps	Goals	Apps	Goals	Apps	Goals	Apps	Goals	Apps	Goals
Radnički Niš	2017–18	SuperLiga	2	0	0	0	0	0	—		2	0
Dinamo Vranje (loan)	2018–19	SuperLiga	7	0	0	0	—		—		7	0
Career total			9	0	0	0	0	0	—		9	0
