= Aleksa Purić =

Serbian footballer

Personal information
- Date of birth: 7 July 2003 (age 23)
- Place of birth: Šabac, Serbia and Montenegro
- Height: 1.96 m (6 ft 5 in)
- Position: Centre-back

Team information
- Current team: Atlético Madrid B
- Number: 15

Youth career
- Savacium
- Partizan

Senior career*
Years	Team	Apps	(Gls)
2021–2023	Partizan	0	(0)
2021–2023	→ Teleoptik (loan)		
2023–2024	Doxa Katokopias	31	(1)
2024–2025	Racing Ferrol	37	(1)
2025–	Atlético Madrid B	31	(1)
2026–	Atlético Madrid	2	(0)
- * Club domestic league appearances and goals as of 24 May 2026

Aleksa Purić (Serbian Cyrillic: Алекса Пурић; born 7 July 2003) is a Serbian professional footballer who plays as a centre-back for Spanish club Atlético Madrid B.

== Club career ==
Born in Šabac, Purić was a youth product of FK Partizan, after joining the club from Škola fudbala Savacium. On 16 October 2020, he signed his first professional contract with the club.

In 2021, Purić moved out on loan to third division side FK Teleoptik. Upon returning in July 2023, he left Partizan and moved to Cypriot First Division side Doxa Katokopias FC on 17 July.

Purić made his professional debut on 21 August 2023, coming on as a late substitute for compatriot Nikola Trujić in a 1–0 home loss to AEL Limassol. He scored his first goal the following 19 April, netting the winner in a 1–0 home success over Nea Salamis Famagusta FC, and finished the season with 31 appearances.

On 4 July 2024, Purić signed for Spanish Segunda División side Racing de Ferrol. He was a first-choice as the club suffering relegation, scoring once in 39 appearances overall.

On 17 July 2025, Purić joined Atlético Madrid on a four-year contract, being initially assigned to the reserves in Primera Federación.

== International career ==
In August 2021, Purić received a call-up from the Serbia national under-19 team.
