= Milan Savić (footballer, born 2000) =

Bosnian footballer (born 2000)

Personal information
- Date of birth: 19 May 2000 (age 26)
- Place of birth: Bijeljina, Republika Srpska, Bosnia and Herzegovina
- Height: 1.75 m (5 ft 9 in)
- Position: Winger

Team information
- Current team: Sloga Doboj
- Number: 44

Youth career
- Radnik Bijeljina
- 2014–2018: Red Star Belgrade
- 2018–2020: Mechelen

Senior career*
Years	Team	Apps	(Gls)
2020–2022	Čukarički	64	(7)
2023	Mladost GAT	4	(0)
2023–2024	Zvijezda 09	18	(0)
2024–2025	Sloboda Užice	29	(0)
2025–	Sloga Doboj	11	(1)

International career
2016–2017	Bosnia and Herzegovina U17	7	(0)
2018	Bosnia and Herzegovina U19	3	(0)
2020–2022	Bosnia and Herzegovina U21	12	(3)
- * Club domestic league appearances and goals as of 20 September 2026

Milan Savić (Bosnian pronunciation: [mǐlan sǎʋitɕ]; born 19 May 2000) is a Bosnian professional footballer who plays as a winger who plays for Bosnian Premier League club Sloga Doboj.

Savić started his professional career at Čukarički.

== Club career ==
=== Early career ===
Savić started playing football at his hometown club Radnik Bijeljina, before joining youth academy of Serbian team Red Star Belgrade in 2014. In 2018, he moved to youth setup of Belgian side Mechelen.

In January 2020, Savić signed with Čukarički. He made his professional debut against Inđija on 6 June at the age of 20. On 11 September, he scored his first professional goal.

== International career ==
Savić represented Bosnia and Herzegovina at all youth levels.

== Career statistics ==
As of match played 20 September 2026

Appearances and goals by club, season and competition
Club	Season	League			National cup (Note: Includes Serbian Cup, Bosnian Cup)		Continental		Total	
Club	Season	Division	Apps	Goals	Apps	Goals	Apps	Goals	Apps	Goals
Čukarički	2019–20	Serbian SuperLiga	3	0	—		—		3	0
Čukarički	2020–21	Serbian SuperLiga	28	4	1	0	—		29	4
Čukarički	2021–22	Serbian SuperLiga	33	3	1	0	1 (Note: Appearance in UEFA Conference League)	0	35	3
Čukarički	Total		64	7	2	0	1	0	67	7
Mladost GAT	2022–23	Serbian SuperLiga	4	0	—		—		4	0
Zvijezda 09	2023–24	Bosnian Premier League	18	0	2	0	—		20	0
Sloboda Užice	2024–25	Serbian First League	29	0	1	0	—		30	0
Sloga Doboj	2025–26	Bosnian Premier League	3	0	—		—		3	0
Sloga Doboj	2026–27	Bosnian Premier League	8	1	0	0	—		8	1
Sloga Doboj	Total		11	1	0	0	—		11	1
Career total			126	8	5	0	1	0	132	8
