= Ognjen Mijailović =

Serbian association football player

Personal information
- Date of birth: 30 January 2003 (age 23)
- Place of birth: Šabac, Federal Republic of Yugoslavia
- Height: 1.90 m (6 ft 3 in)
- Position: Midfielder

Team information
- Current team: Zemun
- Number: 19

Youth career
- –2017: Red Star Belgrade
- 2017–2019: Čukarički
- 2019–2020: Mačva Šabac

Senior career*
Years	Team	Apps	(Gls)
2020–2021	Mačva Šabac	23	(0)
2022	Rad	0	(0)
2022–2023	Radnički Beograd	11	(0)
2023	→ Omladinac (loan)		
2023–	Zemun		
2024	→ Jedinstvo Surčin (loan)		
- * Club domestic league appearances and goals as of 19:15, 13 May 2024 (UTC)

Ognjen Mijailović (Serbian Cyrillic: Огњен Мијаиловић, born 30 January 2003) is a Serbian footballer who currently plays as a midfielder for FK Zemun.

== Career statistics ==
=== Club ===
As of 1 January 2022.

Club	Season	League			Cup		Continental		Other		Total	
Club	Season	Division	Apps	Goals	Apps	Goals	Apps	Goals	Apps	Goals	Apps	Goals
Mačva Šabac	2019–20	Serbian SuperLiga	3	0	0	0	0	0	0	0	3	0
Mačva Šabac	2020–21	Serbian SuperLiga	19	0	0	0	0	0	0	0	19	0
Mačva Šabac	2021–22	Serbian First League	1	0	0	0	0	0	0	0	1	0
Mačva Šabac	Total		23	0	0	0	0	0	0	0	23	0
Rad	2021–22	Serbian First League	0	0	0	0	0	0	0	0	0	0
Career total			23	0	0	0	0	0	0	0	23	0
