= Predrag Milošević (Vojvodina politician) =

Serbian politician

Predrag Milošević (Serbian Cyrillic: Предраг Милошевић; 1964–15 April 2017) was a politician in Serbia. He was the mayor of Sečanj from 2004 to 2017 and a member of the Assembly of Vojvodina from 2008 to 2012. At different times in his career, Milošević was an independent politician, a member of the Democratic Party (Demokratska stranka, DS), and a member of the Serbian Progressive Party (Srpska napredna stranka, SNS).

== Early life and private career ==
Milošević was raised in and around Novi Sad, Vojvodina, in what was then the Socialist Republic of Serbia in the Socialist Federal Republic of Yugoslavia. He was a graduate of the University of Novi Sad Faculty of Law.

== Politician ==
Milošević was first elected as mayor of Sečanj as an independent candidate in the 2004 Serbian local elections, in which Serbia introduced the direct election of mayors. Direct mayoral elections were subsequently abandoned; Milošević led his own For the Development of the Municipality of Sečanj electoral list in the 2008 Serbian local elections and was chosen as mayor for a second term with the support of the DS and G17 Plus. He was also elected to the Vojvodina provincial assembly in the 2008 provincial election as an independent candidate and served for the next four years. He did not seek re-election at the provincial level in 2012.

Milošević had joined the Democratic Party by the time of the 2012 local elections and led the party to a majority victory in Sečanj, after which he was chosen for a third term as mayor. The DS became mired in divisions over the next two years, and in January 2014 Milošević crossed over to the Progressive Party, bringing most of the local DS organization with him. He led the SNS to a majority victory in the municipality in the 2016 local elections and was confirmed as mayor once again.

== Death ==
Milošević died on 15 April 2017 following a short and serious illness.

== Electoral record ==
=== Provincial (Vojvodina) ===
2008 Vojvodina assembly election Sečanj (constituency seat) – first and second rounds
Predrag Milošević	Citizens' Group: For the Development of the Municipality of Sečanj–Karasi	2,707	32.67	3,911	72.75
Milena Vasić Stupar (incumbent)	Socialist Party of Serbia–Party of United Pensioners of Serbia (Affiliation: Socialist Party of Serbia)	1,278	15.42	1,465	27.25
Mirko Škipina	For a European Vojvodina: Democratic Party–G17 Plus, Boris Tadić	984	11.87		
Bogoljub Milenković	Serbian Radical Party	940	11.34		
Dušica Karabenč	Vojvodina's Party	835	10.08		
Milan Lisov	Milan Lisov–Citizens' Group	764	9.22		
Čedo Vukoje	Democratic Party of Serbia	430	5.19		
Gabor Ilijević	Together for Vojvodina–Nenad Čanak	349	4.21		
Total valid votes		8,287	100	5,376	100
Invalid ballots		414		168	
Total votes casts		8,701	70.07	5,544	44.64

=== Municipality of Sečanj ===
2004 Sečanj municipal election Mayor of Sečanj – second round results
Candidate	Party or Coalition	Votes	%
Predrag Miloševic	Citizens' Group	3,013	50.23
		2,986	49.77
Total valid votes		5,999	100
