= Vahid Zimonjić =

Serbian footballer

Personal information
- Full name: Vahid Zimonjić
- Date of birth: 14 July 2000 (age 26)
- Place of birth: Novi Pazar, FR Yugoslavia
- Height: 1.83 m (6 ft 0 in)
- Position: Left-back

Team information
- Current team: Jošanica

Youth career
- Novi Pazar

Senior career*
Years	Team	Apps	(Gls)
2018	Novi Pazar	8	(0)
2020–2023	Novi Pazar	50	(1)
2023–2024	FK Tutin		(1)
2024–2025	Inđija	28	(1)
2025	Loznica	2	(0)
2026–	Jošanica	0	(0)
- * Club domestic league appearances and goals as of 19 March 2026

Vahid Zimonjić (Serbian Cyrillic: Вахид Зимоњић; born 14 July 2000) is a Serbian footballer who plays as a defender for Serbian League West club Jošanica.

== Club career ==
=== Novi Pazar ===
Born in Novi Pazar, Zimonjić came through the same named club academy. Passing all youth categories with the club, he joined the first team at the beginning of 2018 and spent the whole winter break off–season with the senior squad. He made his debut for the club under coach Stevan Mojsilović in 16th fixture match of the 2017–18 Serbian First League campaign against Metalac Gornji Milanovac, played on 9 March 2018.

== Career statistics ==
=== Club ===
As of 17 March 2018

Appearances and goals by club, season and competition
Club	Season	League			Cup		Continental		Other		Total	
Club	Season	Division	Apps	Goals	Apps	Goals	Apps	Goals	Apps	Goals	Apps	Goals
Novi Pazar	2017–18	First League	2	0	—		—		—		2	0
Novi Pazar	Total		2	0	—		—		—		2	0
