= Stefan Purtić =

Serbian professional footballer

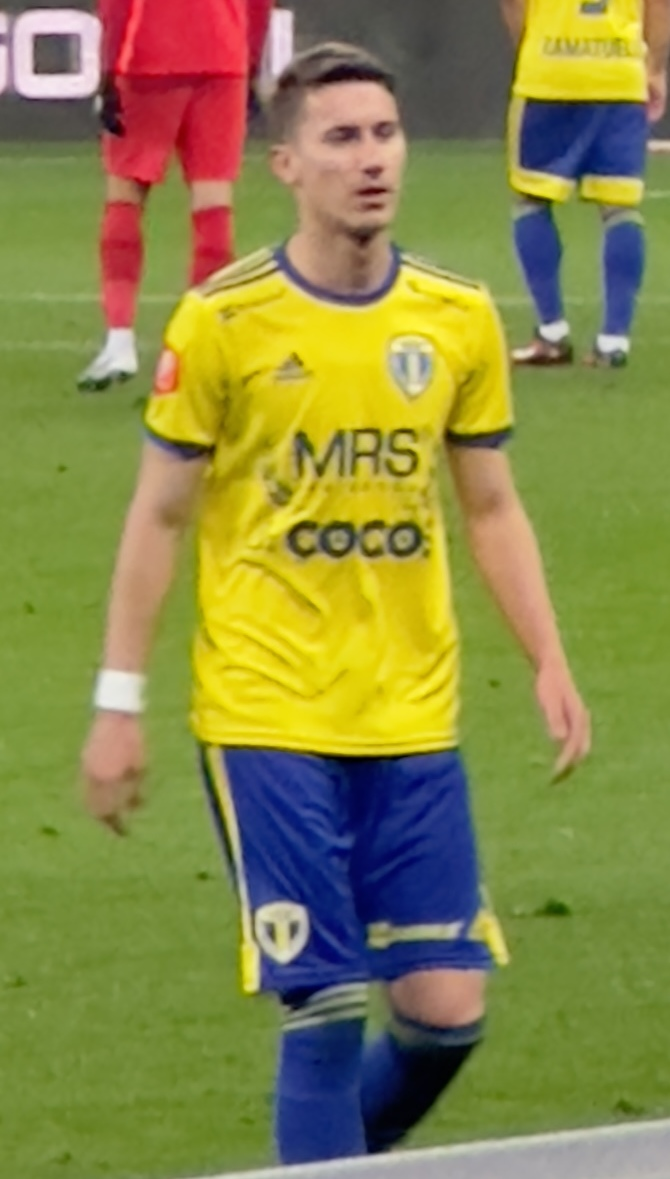
- Purtić with Petrolul Ploiești in 2023

Personal information
- Date of birth: 6 August 1998 (age 28)
- Place of birth: Loznica, FR Yugoslavia
- Height: 1.88 m (6 ft 2 in)
- Position: Midfielder

Team information
- Current team: Loznica
- Number: 77

Youth career
- –2012: Loznica
- 2012–2017: Voždovac

Senior career*
Years	Team	Apps	(Gls)
2017–2022	Voždovac	98	(6)
2018	→ Radnički Obrenovac (loan)	15	(0)
2020	→ Inđija (loan)	21	(3)
2023	Petrolul Ploiești	14	(1)
2023–2024	Železničar Pančevo	22	(0)
2024–2025	Liepāja	30	(0)
2025–	Loznica	31	(5)
- * Club domestic league appearances and goals as of 14 May 2026

Stefan Purtić (Serbian Cyrillic: Стефан Пуртић; born 6 August 1998) is a Serbian professional footballer who plays as a midfielder for Loznica.

== Career ==
=== Early career / Voždovac ===
Purtić started out his career as a junior with his hometown club Loznica, before moving to the academy of Voždovac in 2012. After being loaned out to third division side Radnički Obrenovac at the start of 2018, he made his Serbian SuperLiga debut in a 0–2 away loss to Mačva Šabac on 4 November that year.

Purtić spent 2020 on loan at fellow league team Inđija, and after returning to Voždovac became a regular starter and eventually gained team captaincy.

=== Petrolul Ploiești ===
On 13 January 2023, Purtić moved abroad for the first time and signed for Romanian side Petrolul Ploiești, recently promoted to the Liga I. He scored his first goal on 27 February, in a 2–5 home loss to defending champions CFR Cluj.

== Career statistics ==
As of match played 5 May 2023

Appearances and goals by club, season and competition
Club	Season	League			National Cup		Continental		Other		Total	
Club	Season	Division	Apps	Goals	Apps	Goals	Apps	Goals	Apps	Goals	Apps	Goals
Voždovac
Voždovac	2018–19	Serbian SuperLiga	14	0	—		—		—		14	0
Voždovac	2019–20	Serbian SuperLiga	16	1	1	0	—		—		17	1
Voždovac	2020–21	Serbian SuperLiga	17	3	1	0	—		—		18	3
Voždovac	2021–22	Serbian SuperLiga	34	2	0	0	—		—		34	2
Voždovac	2022–23	Serbian SuperLiga	17	0	1	0	—		—		18	0
Voždovac	Total		98	6	3	0	—		—		101	6
Radnički Obrenovac (loan)	2017–18	Serbian League Belgrade	15	0	—		—		—		15	0
Inđija (loan)	2019–20	Serbian SuperLiga	10	2	1	0	—		—		11	2
Inđija (loan)	2020–21	Serbian SuperLiga	11	1	1	0	—		—		12	1
Inđija (loan)	Total		21	3	2	0	—		—		23	3
Petrolul Ploiești	2022–23	Liga I	13	1	—		—		—		13	1
Petrolul Ploiești	2023–24	Liga I	1	0	—		—		—		1	0
Petrolul Ploiești	Total		14	1	—		—		—		14	1
Železničar Pančevo	2023–24	Serbian SuperLiga	0	0	0	0	—		—		0	0
Career total			148	10	5	0	—		—		153	10
