= Ibrahima Mame N'Diaye =

Senegalese footballer

Ibrahima N'Diaye
Personal information
- Full name: Ibrahima Mame N'Diaye
- Date of birth: 6 December 1994 (age 31)
- Place of birth: Dakar, Senegal
- Height: 1.80 m (5 ft 11 in)
- Position: Forward

Team information
- Current team: Anagennisi Karditsa
- Number: 72

Senior career*
Years	Team	Apps	(Gls)
2010–2012	ASC Linguère	9	(1)
2012–2017	Napredak Kruševac	112	(27)
2017	Randers	7	(0)
2018–2019	Napredak Kruševac	46	(16)
2019–2021	Čukarički	39	(8)
2021	Al Hilal Omdurman		
2021–2024	Čukarički	62	(10)
2024	Mladost Lučani	9	(1)
2025–2026	Dečić	32	(7)
2026–	Anagennisi Karditsa	0	(0)

International career
2011	Senegal U17	3	(1)
- * Club domestic league appearances and goals as of 17 June 2026

Ibrahima Mame N'Diaye (born 6 December 1994) is a Senegalese professional footballer who plays as a forward for Super League Greece 2 club Anagennisi Karditsa.

== Club career ==
Born in Dakar, N'Diaye played for ASC Linguère in his homeland, before moving abroad to Serbia and joining Napredak Kruševac in late 2012. He made his first-team debut in the second half of the 2012–13 Serbian First League, helping them win the title and promotion to the top flight. Over the next two seasons, N'Diaye scored nine goals in the Serbian SuperLiga, before the club suffered relegation. He subsequently scored 10 goals in the 2015–16 Serbian First League, helping them to a first-place finish and promotion back to the top flight. In the summer of 2017, N'Diaye left the club after his contract expired.

On 7 August 2017, N'Diaye officially joined Danish club Randers on a five-month contract. He made seven competitive appearances for the side, scoring one goal in the Danish Cup.

In early 2018, N'Diaye returned to Serbia and his former club Napredak Kruševac.

On 21 January 2021, he joined Sudanese club Al-Hilal, and made 2 appearances for the club in the CAF Cup.

== International career ==
N'Diaye represented Senegal at the 2011 African U-17 Championship, making three appearances and scoring one goal in a 2–1 loss to Egypt, as the team exited in the group stage.

== Career statistics ==
As of 19 August 2019

Appearances and goals by club, season and competition
Club	Season	League		Cup		Continental		Other		Total	
Club	Season	Apps	Goals	Apps	Goals	Apps	Goals	Apps	Goals	Apps	Goals
Napredak Kruševac	2012–13	7	2	0	0	—		—		7	2
Napredak Kruševac	2013–14	17	5	1	0	—		—		18	5
Napredak Kruševac	2014–15	29	4	1	0	—		2 (Note: Appearance(s) in promotion and relegation playoffs)	1	32	5
Napredak Kruševac	2015–16	23	10	2	0	—		—		25	10
Napredak Kruševac	2016–17	36	6	1	0	—		—		37	6
Napredak Kruševac	Total	112	27	5	0	—		2	1	119	28
Randers	2017–18	4	0	3	1	—		—		7	1
Napredak Kruševac	2017–18	13	9	0	0	—		—		13	9
Napredak Kruševac	2018–19	32	7	3	2	—		—		35	9
Napredak Kruševac	2019–20	1	0	0	0	—		—		0	0
Napredak Kruševac	Total	46	16	3	2	—		—		49	18
Career total		164	43	11	3	—		2	1	177	47

== Honours ==
Napredak Kruševac

- Serbian First League: 2012–13, 2015–16
