= Milan Jezdimirović =

Serbian football player

Personal information
- Full name: Milan Jezdimirović
- Date of birth: 5 September 1996 (age 30)
- Place of birth: Užice, FR Yugoslavia
- Height: 1.80 m (5 ft 11 in)
- Position: Right back

Team information
- Current team: ÍBV

Youth career
- Sloboda Užice
- Jedinstvo Užice
- –2014: Zlatibor Čajetina

Senior career*
Years	Team	Apps	(Gls)
2014–2016	Jedinstvo Užice	16	(0)
2015	→ Zlatibor Čajetina (loan)	15	(2)
2016–2017	Zlatibor Čajetina	16	(0)
2017	Jedinstvo Užice	17	(0)
2018–2019	Sloboda Užice	43	(1)
2019–2021	Zlatibor Čajetina	61	(1)
2021–2022	Spartak Subotica	23	(0)
2022	Radnik Surdulica	3	(0)
2023	Džiugas	35	(1)
2024	Valletta	12	(0)
2024-2025	Tekstilac Odžaci	26	
2026	ÍBV	7	(0)
- * Club domestic league appearances and goals as of 3 March 2026

Milan "Jezdo" Jezdimirović (Serbian: Милан Јездимировић; born in Užice, on 5 September 1996) is a Serbian football player who plays for IBV Vestmannaeyjar.
