= Milan Savić (politician) =

Serbian politician

Milan Savić (Serbian Cyrillic: Милан Савић; born 1991) is a politician in Serbia. He served in the National Assembly of Serbia from 2020 to 2021 as a member of the Serbian Progressive Party.

== Early life and career ==
Savić is from northern Kosovo Mitrovica in the disputed territory recognized in Serbia as Kosovo and Metohija. He holds a bachelor's degree (2013) and a master's degree (2017) in architectural engineering from the University of Pristina in northern Kosovo Mitrovica. He was elected as president of the Student Conference of Serbian Universities (SKONUS) in 2016 and re-elected in 2018.

== Politician ==
Savić received the sixty-eighth position on the Progressive Party's Aleksandar Vučić — For Our Children electoral list in the 2020 parliamentary election and was elected when the list won a landslide victory with 188 out of 250 mandates. During his time in parliament, he was a member of the committee on Kosovo-Metohija, a deputy member of the committee on the diaspora and Serbs in the region and the committee on human and minority rights and gender equality, the head of Serbia's parliamentary friendship group with Botswana, and a member of several other parliamentary friendship groups.

During a December 2020 speech in the national assembly, Savić accused Party of Freedom and Justice leader Dragan Đilas and those whom he described as Đilas's "partners in Priština" of having a common interest in overthrowing Serbian president Aleksandar Vučić and killing him along with his family. This statement was condemned by Borko Stefanović, deputy leader of the Party of Freedom and Justice, who said that the Progressives were "no longer [merely] playing with fire" but "burning the whole world to stay in power."

Savić resigned from the national assembly on 11 March 2021.
