= Nikola Čolić =

Serbian footballer (born 2002)

Personal information
- Date of birth: 17 August 2002 (age 24)
- Place of birth: Belgrade, FR Yugoslavia
- Height: 1.75 m (5 ft 9 in)
- Position: Winger

Team information
- Current team: Borac Čačak (on loan from Javor Ivanjica)
- Number: 17

Youth career
- Partizan

Senior career*
Years	Team	Apps	(Gls)
2019–2021	Partizan	7	(1)
2019–2020	→ Teleoptik (loan)		
2021–2022	Čukarički	15	(0)
2022–2024	TSC	2	(0)
2023	→ Novi Sad (loan)	18	(2)
2024–	Javor Ivanjica	20	(0)
2025–	→ Borac Čačak (loan)	24	(2)

International career^{‡}
2018–2019	Serbia U17	6	(1)
- * Club domestic league appearances and goals as of 14 May 2026 ‡ National team caps and goals as of 10 April 2021

Nikola Čolić (Serbian Cyrillic: Никола Чолић; born 17 August 2002) is a Serbian footballer who plays as a winger for Borac Čačak, on loan from Javor Ivanjica.

== Career ==
=== Partizan ===
After progressing through the club's youth system, Čolić signed his first professional contract with Partizan in May 2020. He made his professional debut for the club on 1 August 2020, coming on as a second-half substitute and scoring late in a 3–1 victory over Napredak.
