= FK Loznica =

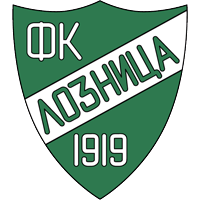
- Full name: Fudbalski klub Loznica
- Nickname: Solunci
- Founded: 1919; 107 years ago
- Ground: Lagator Stadium
- Capacity: 8,030
- Chairman: Sabahudin Mehmedović
- Manager: Dejan Nikolić
- League: Serbian First League
- 2025–26: 4th
- Website: fkloznica.rs
Home colours	Away colours

FK Loznica (Serbian Cyrillic: ФК Лозница) is a professional football club from Loznica, Serbia. They compete in the Serbian First League, the second tier of the national league system.

== History ==
=== LSK ===
The first soccer ball arrived in the town of Loznica in 1919. It was brought from London by local student Milisav Vasić, who had been studying there, playing at Birmingham City F.C. Soon the game became very popular and at the end of 1919 the first club was founded, named Gučevo. Later the name was changed to LSK – Loznički Sportski Klub and was the direct predecessor of today's FK Loznica. During this period, the club did not play in any organized competitions, only friendly matches against other clubs from the neighboring towns of Zvornik, Bijeljina, Šabac or Valjevo. These matches were played on Sundays and many people usually came to attend, especially the local youth that loudly cheered for their club.

=== Trgovački ===
During the Second World War LSK changed its name to FK Trgovački and gathered the best players from Loznica. The club colours were green and white. The first president was a merchant Mr. Pavle Avramović. In 1942 another club FK Srbadija was formed. During these hard years of war, the football matches were the most important pastime for the citizens. Each time FK Mačva Šabac came to play, afterward a night event would be organised in the Vuk Karadžić Culture Center, a real celebration for that period. Besides Trgovački and Srbadija, a third club was created in Loznica, FK Polet. Football was so popular that was possible to see that almost every street had a minor youth club where local children played. Even many elder people started playing. Loznica was liberated by Allied troops on September 23, 1944, and some matches between Partisans units played friendly matches against local clubs, many times even under enemy fire coming from across the river Drina where some rest of German troops returning from Greece were still stationed.

=== FK Jadar and finally FK Loznica ===
With the liberation of Loznica the reconstruction starts and the development in all areas begins again. The football stadium is completely reconstructed and renovated. The club changes its name to FK Jadar. The club starts competing in lower regional leagues. It is then finally renamed into FK Loznica. In 1949 another club is formed in Loznica, FK Proleter Loznica, and a huge rivalry bagins between the two clubs. A few years later FK Loznica will move from their earlier "Sokolana" field to a new one at Lagator Stadium where still plays today and where it has one of the best stadiums found in the region. During this period the club started celebrating its annual 7 February "Green&white evening".

=== 1990s ===
The major club success was achieved in this period when under the presidents Mr. Nikola Ristivojević and Mr. Milan Josić and together with the help of private investors such as Mr. Dobrivoje Stojnić, an owner of the enterprise STOBEX, that facilitated the use of all construction equipment, made possible the creation of a modern stadium. Many other influential people from Loznica helped providing all necessary help. The club had received green light from the commission of the FR Yugoslav Football Association and FIFA officials for hosting international matches. The most astonishing fact was that the construction was made during summer and concluded in little less than two months. Many matches of the FR Yugoslav and Serbian under-21 teams were played there.

=== Clubs glorious period ===
With their new stadium club ambitions grew and with the help of renamed coaches such as Miroslav Milanović, Pero Slavkić and Đorđe Gerum the rise to the top league began. Initially, the qualification to the Second League and next to the First League of FR Yugoslavia was achieved. Their first top league match was played home against FK Budućnost Podgorica, achieving a 2–0 victory for the delirium of the home spectators. In this period beside the local crowd it was usual to see people coming from the cities of Šabac, Valjevo, Zvornik, Bijeljina and other places to cheer for the club. In a home match against the famous Red Star, 15,000 spectators were present when Loznica achieved a result of 2–2. In several occasions the former President of the Yugoslav and Serbia FA assisted the matches and in one occasion he said that "the Lagator was a small Wembley"!

=== Recent period ===
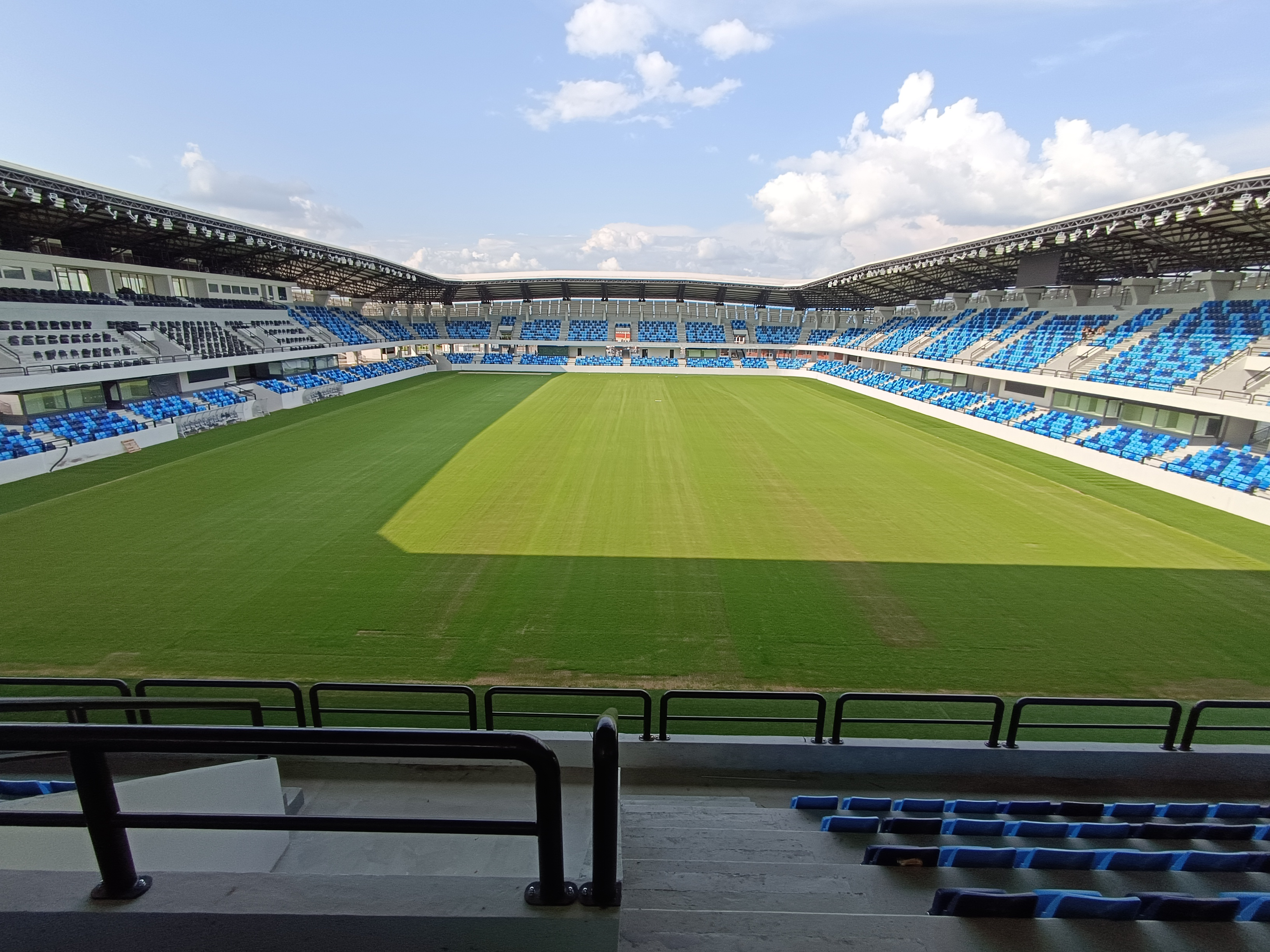
View from Lagator Stadium southern stand

After that era, the team saw continuous relegation from the top league. However, in 2008, the club got promotion, and the team celebrated its 90th anniversary in 2009. After that, the main supporters club of FK Loznica, "Solunci" underwent restructuring. The club and the fans are also connected with the heritage of Loznica born journalist and commentator of the radio, Božidar Kičević, who started the radio commentary for the first match of FK Loznica in the First League in the 1990s by saying "Good morning First League!"

=== Recent league history ===
Season	Division	P	W	D	L	F	A	Pts	Pos
2020–21	2 - Serbian First League	34	15	9	10	57	42	54	5th
2021–22	2 - Serbian First League	30	11	8	11	29	26	41	8th
2022–23	2 - Serbian First League	30	7	10	13	28	45	31	14th
2023–24	3 - Serbian League West	30	12	10	8	49	37	46	5th
2024–25	3 - Serbian League West	30	14	7	9	38	23	49	3rd

== Players ==
=== Current squad ===
As of 1 August 2026

Note: Flags indicate national team as defined under FIFA eligibility rules; some limited exceptions apply. Players may hold more than one non-FIFA nationality.

No.	Pos.	Nation	Player
1	GK	SRB	Boris Damnjanović
2	DF	SRB	Milan Ilić
4	MF	SRB	Leontije Vasić (on loan from IMT)
5	DF	SRB	Darko Stanojević (captain)
6	MF	SRB	Nemanja Ahcin
7	FW	SRB	Lazar Mališ
8	MF	SRB	Lazar Nikolić
9	FW	SRB	Miloš Andrić
10	MF	SRB	David Starčević
11	DF	SRB	Petar Ćirković
14	FW	SRB	Đorđe Šušnjar
15	FW	SRB	Aleksandar Katanić
16	DF	SRB	Danilo Novićević
17	MF	SRB	Stefan Trajkovski

No.	Pos.	Nation	Player
19	DF	SRB	Filip Matić
20	DF	SRB	Ljubiša Pecelj
22	FW	SRB	Strahinja Čarapić
23	DF	SRB	Igor Petrović (vice-captain)
24	FW	SRB	Miloje Jelenić
28	DF	SRB	Aleksa Vidić
30	DF	SRB	Milan Jezdimirović
32	GK	BIH	Nikola Lakić
42	MF	SRB	Nemanja Krstić
43	GK	SRB	Petar Antonić
70	FW	SRB	Slaviša Stojanović
77	MF	SRB	Stefan Purtić
91	MF	SRB	Andrej Mandić

=== Out on loan ===
Note: Flags indicate national team as defined under FIFA eligibility rules; some limited exceptions apply. Players may hold more than one non-FIFA nationality.

No.	Pos.	Nation	Player

=== Coaching staff ===
Position	Name
Head coach	(Serbia) Dejan Nikolić
Assistant coach	(Serbia) Nikola Pajić
Fitness coach	(Serbia) Stefan Pajić
Goalkeeping coach	(Serbia) Saša Krsmanović
Physiotherapist	(Serbia) Duška Đorđić (Serbia) Petar Babić
Analyst coach	(Serbia) Dragan Aleksić
Security commissioner	(Serbia) Milisav Ristivojević
Doctor	(Serbia) Filip Gligorić (Serbia) Miloš Radojčić
General secretary	(Serbia) Ljubiša Vujčić
