= 2017 Serbian Cup final =

2017 Serbian Cup Final
- Event: 2016–17 Serbian Cup
Partizan	Red Star
1	0
- Date: 27 May 2017
- Venue: Partizan Stadium, Belgrade
- Referee: Milorad Mažić
- Attendance: 20,000

The 2017 Serbian Cup Final was the 11th final of the Serbian Cup. It took place on 27 May 2017 at Partizan Stadium in Belgrade, Serbia and was contested between rivals Partizan and Red Star.

The match was broadcast live in Serbia by Arena Sport.

== Route to the Final ==
=== Partizan ===
Round	Opposition	Score
1st round	Napredak Kruševac (H)	3–1
2nd round	Žarkovo (A)	0–2
QF	Voždovac (A)	1–2
SF 1st leg	Vojvodina (A)	0–0
SF 2nd leg	Vojvodina (H)	1–0
Key: (H) = Home venue; (A) = Away venue; (N) = Neutral venue.

Partizan started their campaign in the 1st round. In it, they were drawn at home against Napredak Kruševac. At home, Partizan won 3–1 with two goals from Uroš Đurđević and one goal from Leonardo. In the 2nd round, Partizan drew Serbian League Belgrade side Žarkovo. Partizan won 2–0 with two goals from Valeri Bojinov. In the quarter-finals, Partizan were drawn Serbian SuperLiga fellow Voždovac. At the Voždovac Stadium, Partizan won 2–1 with goals from Đurđević and Leonardo. In the first leg of semi-final at Karađorđe Stadium, Partizan played without goals against Vojvodina. In the second leg, Partizan won 1–0 at home, with Đurđević's goal and reached the final.

=== Red Star ===
Round	Opposition	Score
1st round	ČSK Čelarevo (A)	0–3
2nd round	BSK Borča (H)	3–0
QF	Mladost Lučani (H)	4–2
SF 1st leg	Čukarički (A)	1–4
SF 2nd leg	Čukarički (H)	1–2
Key: (H) = Home venue; (A) = Away venue; (N) = Neutral venue.

Red Star also started in the 1st where they were drawn at away against Serbian First League side ČSK Čelarevo. Red Star won 3–0 with goal from Marko Poletanović, captain Aleksandar Luković and Predrag Sikimić. In the 2nd round, they were drawn with Serbian First League team BSK Borča at home. Red Star won 3–0 with goals from Slavoljub Srnić, Hugo Vieira and Petar Orlandić. In the Quarter-finals, they were drawn against fellow Serbian SuperLiga side and Mladost Lučani. At home, Red Star won 4–2 thanks with goals from Guélor Kanga, Nemanja Milić, Richmond Boakye and Aleksandar Luković. In the first leg of semi-finals, Red Star were drawn against fellow Serbian SuperLiga, Čukarički. Red Star won 4–1 at away, with a goal from Damien Le Tallec, two goals from Richmond Boakye and one own goal. In the second leg, Red Star has lost 1–2 at home. Richmond Boakye has scored from penalty spot.

== Pre-match ==
The match should to be played on Karađorđe Stadium in Novi Sad. After semi-finals, in the final are qualified Partizan and Red Star and It was decided that the match was held in Belgrade. On 18 May 2017, on the draw was decided to play on Partizan Stadium.

The last meeting between Partizan and Red Star in Cup final, was in the 2000–01 FR Yugoslavia Cup. The game was played at Red Star's stadium and Partizan won 1–0 by Saša Ilić's goal in 65th minute. It is interesting that Saša Ilić still plays in Partizan.

Due to injuries, for Partizan could not play Brazilian defensive midfielder Everton Luiz and goalkeeper Filip Kljajić. For Partizan could not play and left-back Nemanja Miletić, because he got yellow card against Vojvodina, in the second leg of the semi-finals.

For Red Star could not play Ghanaian defender Abraham Frimpong, because he got a yellow card against Čukarički, in the second leg of the semi-finals.

== Details ==
27 May 2017
18:00 CEST (UTC+2)

Partizan	1–0	Red Star
Milenković 42'	Report

Partizan Stadium, Belgrade
Attendance: 20,000
Referee: Milorad Mažić

Partizan	Red Star

GK	85	(Serbia) Nemanja Stevanović
RB	4	(Serbia) Miroslav Vulićević (c) (yellow card) 63'
CB	4	(Serbia) Nikola Milenković
CB	18	(Serbia) Bojan Ostojić (yellow card) 1'
LB	24	(Libya) Mohamed El Monir (yellow card) 75'
CM	8	(Serbia) Marko Jevtović
CM	29	(Montenegro) Nebojša Kosović
LM	7	(Serbia) Nemanja Mihajlović (substituted off) 65'
RM	95	(Montenegro) Marko Janković (yellow card) 79' (substituted off) 88'
SS	42	(Brazil) Leonardo (yellow card) 35' (substituted off) 84'
CF	32	(Serbia) Uroš Đurđević
Substitutes:
GK	61	(Serbia) Marko Jovičić
CB	6	(Serbia) Lazar Ćirković
DM	29	(Serbia) Milan Radin (substituted on) 84'
CM	22	(Serbia) Saša Ilić (substituted on) 88'
AM	11	(Serbia) Petar Đuričković (substituted on) 65' (yellow card) 90+5'
CF	3	(Cameroon) Léandre Tawamba
CF	99	(Serbia) Đorđe Jovanović
Manager:
(Serbia) Marko Nikolić

GK	1	(Serbia) Damir Kahriman
RB	2	(Serbia) Marko Petković
CB	4	(France) Damien Le Tallec
CB	3	(Serbia) Aleksandar Luković
LB	33	(Serbia) Dušan Anđelković
DM	73	(Serbia) Mihailo Ristić (substituted off) 85'
DM	20	(Netherlands) Mitchell Donald (yellow card) 36'
AM	8	(Gabon) Guélor Kanga
RW	17	(Serbia) Srđan Plavšić (yellow card) 67' (substituted off) 69'
CF	19	(Ghana) Richmond Boakye
LW	55	(Serbia) Slavoljub Srnić (substituted off) 60'
Substitutes:
GK	22	(Serbia) Filip Manojlović
DM	6	(Serbia) Uroš Račić
CM	10	(Serbia) Nenad Milijaš (substituted on) 85'
RW	16	(Serbia) Nemanja Milić (substituted on) 60'
CF	45	(Serbia) Luka Adžić
CF	69	(Serbia) Srđan Vujaklija (substituted on) 69'
CF	81	(Serbia) Predrag Sikimić
Manager:
(North Macedonia) Boško Gjurovski
