= 2016–17 FK Partizan season =

FK Partizan
2016–17 season
- President: Milorad Vučelić
- Head coach: Ivan Tomić(until 31 July 2016); Marko Nikolić
- SuperLiga: 1st
- Serbian Cup: Winners
- UEFA Europa League: Second qualifying round
- Top goalscorer: League: Uroš Đurđević; Leonardo (24 each); All: Uroš Đurđević (28 goals)
- Highest home attendance: 26,785 vs Mladost; 21 May 2017
- Lowest home attendance: 1,500 vs Spartak; 15 December 2016
Home colours	Away colours

The 2016–17 season is Fudbalski klub Partizan's the 70th season in existence and the club's 11th season in competing in the Serbian SuperLiga.

== Season overview ==
On 14 July 2016, Partizan opened season with a 0–0 home draw against Zagłębie Lubin in second qualifying round for the UEFA Europa League. A week later, in Lubin, after penalty drama Partizan was eliminated. Three days later, Partizan opened season in Serbian SuperLiga with another draw (0–0) against novice in SuperLiga (Bačka) at Karađorđe Stadium. In next round, Partizan has lost against Napredak at Mladost Stadium. In that match, Partizan has scored first goal in the season, after 388 minutes. That goal was scored by Valeri Bojinov from penalty spot. After that match, coach Ivan Tomić resigned from the position. On 4 August 2016, coach Marko Nikolić returned to Partizan on a two-year deal. On 10 August, Partizan made first victory in the season, by beating Javor 2–0 in Ivanjica. On 17 September 2016, Partizan beat Red Star 1–0 at home in Eternal derby. The winning goal has scored Leonardo in 89th minute. The difference on the standings with reduced from nine to six points. Partizan made six consecutive wins before he draw (1–1) against Radnički Niš at home, on 22 October. After that match, Partizan made four more consecutive wins before he draw (0–0) against Vojvodina at Karađorđe Stadium, on 30 November. On 15 December, in the last match of the year, Leonardo's goals in 54th minute and in 63rd minute (second goal was from a free kick) was enough for Partizan to beat Spartak 2–0 at home. Partizan finished a year at second place, six points behind Red Star.

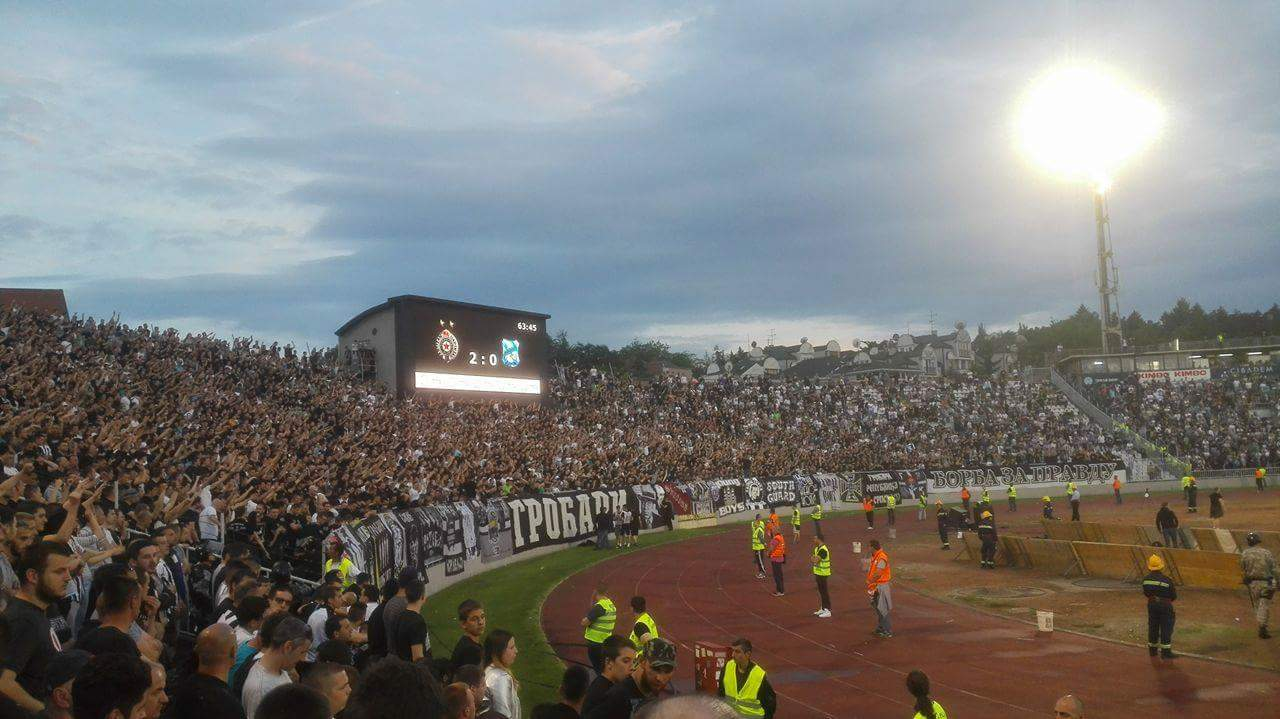
Grobari against Mladost Lučani on 21 May

On 19 February, Partizan made first victory in 2017 (1–0 away), against Rad. On 4 March, Partizan drew 1–1 at Rajko Mitić Stadium, in Eternal derby, against Red Star. Red Star take the lead in 34th minute (the ball has leave the pitch, but referee did not see). Uroš Đurđević has scored equalizer in 88th minute for Partizan. After that match, Partizan made six consecutive wins before play-off. On 18 April, in first match of play-off, Partizan made a huge victory at Rajko Mitić Stadium, in Eternal derby, against Red Star. Leonardo scored the leading goal, from a free kick in 21st minute, Red Star equalized in 48th minute. Partizan take the lead again, Léandre Tawamba scored a goal in 68th minute. Leonardo score one more goal, in 79th minute for a 3–1 away victory. After that match, Partizan and Red Star had the same number of points, but Red Star had the advantage because had more points before play-off. Four days later, Partizan beat Vojvodina 1–0 at home. Uroš Đurđević has scored a goal in 34th second of the match. On 6 May, after Red Star's defeat Partizan erupt on 1st place. Partizan was on the 1st place for the first time after 637 days. On 13 May, Partizan made very important victory (2–1 at home) against Voždovac. Four days later, Partizan made a key victory for title. Leonardo has scored in 47th minute and Uroš Đurđević in 60th and 73rd minute for 3–1 away victory over Radnički Niš. On 21 May, Partizan beat Mladost Lučani 5–0 at home in front of 26,785 fans and won 27th title.

On 27 May, in the Serbian Cup Final, in his last match for Partizan, Nikola Milenković scored a header against Partizans' biggest rival, Red Star which won the game 1–0 and clinched Partizans' double of the season, winning both the league and cup competitions. After a great season, Miroslav Vulićević, Bojan Ostojić, Everton Luiz, Leonardo and Uroš Đurđević was named in the Serbian SuperLiga Team of the Season due to his performances throughout the season. Uroš Đurđević was named for the Serbian SuperLiga Player of the Season and coach Marko Nikolić was named for the Serbian SuperLiga Coach of the season.

== Transfers ==
=== In ===
Date	Position	Name	From	Type	Ref.
2 June 2016	MF	(Serbia) Petar Đuričković	(Serbia) Radnički Niš	Transfer	
3 June 2016	MF	(Serbia) Milan Radin	(Serbia) Voždovac	Transfer	
3 June 2016	DF	(Serbia) Nemanja Miletić	(Serbia) Javor	Transfer	
7 June 2016	MF	(Serbia) Saša Marjanović	(Serbia) Radnički Niš	Transfer	
8 June 2016	MF	(Serbia) Jovan Nišić	(Serbia) Teleoptik	Loan return	
8 June 2016	MF	(Serbia) Uroš Damnjanović	(Serbia) Sinđelić Beograd	Loan return	
15 June 2016	MF	(Serbia) Miroslav Radović	(Slovenia) Olimpija	Transfer	
15 June 2016	MF	(Montenegro) Marko Janković	(Greece) Olympiacos	Loan	
21 June 2016	FW	(Serbia) Nikola Đurđić	(Germany) Augsburg	Transfer	
1 July 2016	DF	(Serbia) Bojan Ostojić	(Serbia) Čukarički	Transfer	
8 July 2016	MF	(Brazil) Leonardo	(Russia) Anzhi Makhachkala	Free transfer	
29 July 2016	GK	(Serbia) Nemanja Stevanović	(Serbia) Čukarički	Transfer	
22 August 2016	FW	(Serbia) Uroš Đurđević	(Italy) Palermo	Transfer	
31 August 2016	FW	(Serbia) Sava Petrov	(Serbia) Teleoptik	Sign	
24 November 2016	DF	(Serbia) Strahinja Bošnjak	(Serbia) Teleoptik	Sign	
26 November 2016	FW	(Cameroon) Léandre Tawamba	(Kazakhstan) Kairat	Free transfer	
16 January 2017	DF	(Libya) Mohamed El Monir	(Belarus) Dinamo Minsk	Free transfer	

=== Out ===
Date	Position	Name	To	Type	Ref.
9 June 2016	LB	(Serbia) Nikola Leković	(Poland) Lechia Gdańsk	Loan return	
10 June 2016	GK	(Serbia) Živko Živković	(Greece) Skoda Xanthi	Transfer	
10 June 2016	MF	(Serbia) Andrija Živković	(Portugal) Benfica	Free transfer	
16 June 2016	MF	(Serbia) Veljko Birmančević	(Serbia) Teleoptik	Loan	
18 June 2016	DF	(Serbia) Marko Jovanović	(Israel) Bnei Yehuda	Free transfer	
23 June 2016	MF	(Serbia) Nemanja Glavčić	(Serbia) Spartak Subotica	Loan	
25 June 2016	FW	(Ivory Coast) Ismaël Béko Fofana	(Serbia) Čukarički	Transfer	
8 July 2016	DF	(Serbia) Nemanja Petrović	(Portugal) Chaves	Transfer	
19 July 2016	DF	(Bulgaria) Ivan Bandalovski	Unattached	Released	
19 July 2016	MF	(Serbia) Saša Lukić	(Italy) Torino	Transfer	
27 July 2016	DF	(Bosnia and Herzegovina) Aleksandar Subić	(Bosnia and Herzegovina) Sloboda Tuzla	Loan	
17 August 2016	DF	(Serbia) Miladin Stevanović	(Turkey) Kayserispor	Transfer	
19 August 2016	MF	(Serbia) Marko Golubović	(Serbia) Sinđelić Beograd	Loan	
25 August 2016	MF	(Serbia) Darko Brašanac	(Spain) Real Betis	Transfer	
30 August 2016	MF	(Serbia) Miroslav Radović	(Poland) Legia Warsaw	Transfer	
31 August 2016	GK	(Serbia) Bojan Šaranov	(Azerbaijan) Qarabağ	Free transfer	
16 December 2016	DF	(Slovenia) Gregor Balažic	(Russia) Ural	Free transfer	
24 January 2017	DF	(Ivory Coast) Cédric Gogoua	(Latvia) Riga	Free transfer	
31 January 2017	FW	(Serbia) Nikola Đurđić	(Denmark) Randers	Transfer	
17 February 2017	FW	(Bulgaria) Valeri Bojinov	(China) Meizhou Hakka	Free transfer	
17 February 2017	LB	(Serbia) Miroslav Bogosavac	(Serbia) Čukarički	Transfer	
26 February 2017	MF	(Serbia) Uroš Damnjanović	(Slovakia) Slovan Bratislava	Transfer	
6 March 2017	DF	(Serbia) Miloš Ostojić	(Belarus) BATE Borisov	Free transfer	

== Players ==
=== Squad ===
No.	Name	Nationality	Position (s)	Date of birth (age)	Signed from	Notes
Goalkeepers
12	Filip Kljajić	(Serbia)	GK	16 August 1990 (age 36)	(Serbia) Rad	
61	Marko Jovičić	(Serbia)	GK	2 February 1995 (age 31)	(Serbia) Teleoptik	
85	Nemanja Stevanović	(Serbia)	GK	8 May 1992 (age 34)	(Serbia) Čukarički	
Defenders
4	Miroslav Vulićević	(Serbia)	RB	29 May 1985 (age 41)	(Serbia) Vojvodina	Vice-captain
5	Strahinja Bošnjak	(Serbia)	CB	18 February 1999 (age 27)	Youth system	
6	Lazar Ćirković	(Serbia)	CB	22 August 1992 (age 34)	(Serbia) Rad	
13	Mohamed El Monir	(Libya)	LB	8 April 1992 (age 34)	(Belarus) Dinamo Minsk	
23	Bojan Ostojić	(Serbia)	CB	12 February 1984 (age 42)	(Serbia) Čukarički	
26	Nemanja Miletić	(Serbia)	LB	26 July 1991 (age 35)	(Serbia) Javor Ivanjica	
31	Nikola Milenković	(Serbia)	CB	12 October 1997 (age 29)	Youth system	Second vice-captain
Midfielders
7	Nemanja Mihajlović	(Serbia)	LW / RW	19 January 1996 (age 30)	(Serbia) Rad	
11	Petar Đuričković	(Serbia)	CM / AM	20 June 1991 (age 35)	(Serbia) Radnički Niš	
17	Saša Marjanović	(Serbia)	DM / CM	13 November 1987 (age 39)	(Serbia) Radnički Niš	
21	Marko Jevtović	(Serbia)	DM	24 July 1993 (age 33)	(Serbia) Novi Pazar	
22	Saša Ilić	(Serbia)	CM / AM	30 December 1977 (age 48)	(Austria) Red Bull Salzburg	Captain
25	Everton Luiz	(Brazil)	DM / CM	24 May 1988 (age 38)	(Switzerland) St. Gallen	
27	Nebojša Kosović	(Montenegro)	CM / AM	24 February 1995 (age 31)	(Belgium) Standard Liège	
29	Milan Radin	(Serbia)	DM / RB	25 June 1991 (age 35)	(Serbia) Voždovac	
42	Leonardo	(Brazil)	LW / SS / ST	18 March 1992 (age 34)	(Russia) Anzhi Makhachkala	
91	Alen Stevanović	(Serbia)	RW / LW	7 January 1991 (age 35)	(Italy) Torino	
95	Marko Janković	(Montenegro)	RW / LW / AM	9 July 1995 (age 31)	(Greece) Olympiacos	
Forwards
3	Léandre Tawamba	(Cameroon)	ST / CF / AM	20 December 1989 (age 36)	(Kazakhstan) Kairat	
8	Vladimir Đilas	(Serbia)	ST / CF	3 March 1983 (age 43)	(Bosnia and Herzegovina) Borac Banja Luka	
9	Dušan Vlahović	(Serbia)	ST / CF	28 January 2000 (age 26)	Youth system	
32	Uroš Đurđević	(Serbia)	ST / CF	2 March 1994 (age 32)	(Italy) Palermo	
70	Sava Petrov	(Serbia)	ST / CF	18 June 1998 (age 19)	Youth system	
99	Đorđe Jovanović	(Serbia)	ST / CF	15 February 1999 (age 17)	Youth system	

== Friendlies ==
23 June 2016 Friendly	APOEL (Cyprus)	1–0	(Serbia) Partizan	Gniewino, Poland
17:30	De Vincenti 71' (pen.)	Report (in Serbian)		Stadium: Arena Mistrzów; Referee: Damian Kos

28 June 2016 Friendly	Pogoń Lębork (Poland)	0–3	(Serbia) Partizan	Gniewino, Poland
17:00		Report (in Serbian)	Radović 43' (pen.); Bojinov 47'; Marjanović 63'	Stadium: Arena Mistrzów; Referee: Bartomiej Behmke

2 July 2016 Friendly	Lechia Gdańsk (Poland)	0–3	(Serbia) Partizan	Gniewino, Poland
11:00		Report (in Serbian)	Balažic 30'; Bojinov 35'; Vlahović 69'	Stadium: Arena Mistrzów; Referee: Kamil Rybinshi

2 July 2016 Friendly	Drutex-Bytovia (Poland)	0–1	(Serbia) Partizan	Gniewino, Poland
18:00		Report (in Serbian)	Vlahović 35'	Stadium: Arena Mistrzów; Referee: Kamil Grzebowski

6 July 2016 Friendly	Partizan (Serbia)	1–3	(Romania) Viitorul	Gniewino, Poland
18:00	Đurđić 32' (pen.)	Report (in Serbian)	Chițu 9' (pen.) 59'; Tănase 69'	Stadium: Arena Mistrzów; Referee: Marsin Zarualski

8 October 2016 Friendly	Partizan (Serbia)	1–2	(Greece) PAOK	Belgrade, Serbia
17:00	Jovanović 70'	Report (in Serbian)	Biseswar 2' 8'	Stadium: Partizan Stadium; Attendance: 17,000; Referee: Srđan Jovanović

2 November 2016 Friendly	Partizan (Serbia)	3–1	(Serbia) Zemun	Belgrade, Serbia
14:00	Đurđić 2' (pen.); Đuričković 43'; Mutombo 59'	Report (in Serbian)	Sotirović 13'	Referee: Dejan Trifković

11 November 2016 Friendly	Videoton (Hungary)	1–0	(Serbia) Partizan	Felcsút, Hungary
18:00	Feczesin 41'	Report (in Serbian)		Stadium: Pancho Arena; Attendance: 1,000; Referee: Zőts Gergely

18 January 2017 Friendly	Partizan (Serbia)	6–1	(Serbia) BSK Borča	Belgrade, Serbia
11:00	Đurđević 23' 33'; Jevtović 37'; Stevanović 56'; Bojinov 60'; Jovanović 78'	Report (in Serbian)	Gojković 4'	Stadium: Blatuša; Attendance: 500; Referee: Srđan Jovanović

22 January 2017 Friendly	Koper (Slovenia)	0–4	(Serbia) Partizan	Koper, Slovenia
15:00		Report (in Serbian)	Đuričković 5'; Đurđević 12' 36' 40'	Stadium: Bonifika Stadium; Attendance: 1,000; Referee: Danijel Jerman

26 January 2017 Friendly	Gorica (Slovenia)	0–3	(Serbia) Partizan	Koper, Slovenia
13:00		Report (in Serbian)	Đuričković 56'; Mihajlović 59' (pen.) 66'	Stadium: assistant field of Bonifika Stadium; Referee: Mateo Tozan

2 February 2017 Friendly	Partizan (Serbia)	1–2	(Germany) Kickers Offenbach	Limassol, Cyprus
10:00	Đilas 88'	Report (in Serbian)	Neofytos 44'; Hodja 85'	Stadium: Koinotiko Gnpedo Agioy Tixona; Referee: Marios Christofi

2 February 2017 Friendly	Korona Kielce (Poland)	0–2	(Serbia) Partizan	Germasogeia, Cyprus
14:00		Report (in Serbian)	Đurđević 12'; Mihajlović 14'	Stadium: Municipal Stadium Germasogeia; Referee: Marios Christofi

4 February 2017 Friendly	Partizan (Serbia)	2–1	(Lithuania) Atlantas	Germasogeia, Cyprus
15:00	Mihajlović 67' (pen.); Jovanović 80'	Report (in Serbian)	Verbickas 65'	Stadium: Municipal Stadium Germasogeia; Referee: Marios Christofi

6 February 2017 Friendly	Partizan (Serbia)	4–0	(Ukraine) Zirka Kropyvnytskyi	Germasogeia, Cyprus
15:00	Janković 37'; Leonardo 54'; Đurđević 58' 64'	Report (in Serbian)		Stadium: Municipal Stadium Germasogeia; Referee: Georgiou Georgos

8 February 2017 Friendly	Levski Sofia (Bulgaria)	1–1	(Serbia) Partizan	Germasogeia, Cyprus
15:00	Prochazka 57'	Report (in Serbian)	Jovanović 69'	Stadium: Municipal Stadium Germasogeia; Referee: Georgiou Georgos

11 February 2017 Friendly	Partizan (Serbia)	2–0	(Russia) Ural Yekaterinburg	Germasogeia, Cyprus
14:00	Leonardo 77'; Đurđević 88'	Report (in Serbian)		Stadium: Municipal Stadium Germasogeia; Referee: Marios Christofi

21 February 2017 Friendly	Partizan (Serbia)	3–2	(Serbia) Inđija	Belgrade, Serbia
13:00	Tawamba 24'; Kosović 29'; Mihajlović 49'	Report (in Serbian)	Lemajić 67' (pen.) 72'	Attendance: 100; Referee: Dejan Trifković

25 March 2017 Friendly	Partizan (Serbia)	2–0	(Bosnia and Herzegovina) Radnik Bijeljina	Belgrade, Serbia
14:00	Tawamba 34'; Leonardo 59'	Report (in Serbian)		Stadium: Partizan Stadium; Referee: Dejan Santrač

== Competitions ==
=== Overview ===
Competition	Record							
Competition	P	W	D	L	GF	GA	GD	Win %
Serbian SuperLiga	37	30	4	3	78	22	+56	81.08
Serbian Cup	6	5	1	0	9	2	+7	83.33
UEFA Europa League	2	0	2	0	0	0	+0	0.00
Total	45	35	7	3	87	24	+63	77.78

=== Serbian SuperLiga ===
==== Regular season ====
===== League table =====
Pos	Team	Pld	W	D	L	GF	GA	GD	Pts	Qualification or relegation
1	Red Star Belgrade	30	25	4	1	75	25	+50	79	Qualification for the Championship round
2	Partizan	30	23	4	3	59	17	+42	73	Qualification for the Championship round
3	Vojvodina	30	18	5	7	51	26	+25	59	Qualification for the Championship round
4	Napredak Kruševac	30	15	7	8	35	23	+12	52	Qualification for the Championship round
5	Mladost Lučani	30	14	6	10	35	29	+6	48	Qualification for the Championship round

Source: UEFA, Soccerway
Rules for classification: 1) Points; 2) Head-to-head points; 3) Head-to-head goal difference; 4) Head-to-head goals scored; 5) Head-to-head away goals scored (if two teams tied); 6) Goal difference; 7) Goals scored; 8) Fairplay ranking; 9) Draw.

===== Results by matchday =====
Matchday	1	2	3	4	5	6	7	8	9	10	11	12	13	14	15	16	17	18	19	20	21	22	23	24	25	26	27	28	29	30
Ground	A	A	H	A	H	A	H	A	H	A	H	A	H	A	H	H	H	A	H	A	H	A	H	A	H	A	H	A	H	A
Result	D	L	L	W	W	L	W	W	W	W	W	W	D	W	W	W	W	D	W	W	W	W	W	D	W	W	W	W	W	W
Position	11	12	14	12	7	11	7	5	4	4	3	3	3	2	2	2	2	2	2	2	2	2	2	2	2	2	2	2	2	2

Updated to match(es) played on 13 April 2017. Source: superliga.rs
A = Away; H = Home; W = Win; D = Draw; L = Loss

===== Results =====
24 July 2016 1	Bačka	0 – 0	Partizan	Novi Sad
19:00 CEST (UTC+2)	Bjeloš (yellow card) 24' (yellow-red card) 80'; Ilić (yellow card) 49'; Rogač (yellow card) 90+4'	Report; Summary		Stadium: Karađorđe Stadium; Attendance: 5,000; Referee: Novak Simović

31 July 2016 2	Napredak	2 – 1	Partizan	Kruševac
19:00 CEST (UTC+2)	Šljivić 21' (pen.) (yellow card) 69'; N'Diaye (yellow card) 60'; Projić 70'; Varga (yellow card) 90'	Report; Summary	Luiz (yellow card) 79'; Leonardo (yellow card) 81'; Bojinov 87' (pen.)	Stadium: Mladost Stadium; Attendance: 7,000; Referee: Dejan Santrač

7 August 2016 3	Partizan	1 – 3	Vojvodina	Belgrade
19:00 CEST (UTC+2)	Luiz (yellow card) 34'; Bojinov (yellow card) 40' (goal) 64'; Brašanac (yellow card) 50'; Balažic (yellow card) 61'; Bogosavac (yellow card) 74'; Ilić (yellow card) 75'; Leonardo (yellow card) 78'	report Summary	Meleg 6'; Paločević 29'; Trujić (yellow card) 30'; Puškarić (yellow card) 41'; Mićić (yellow card) 45'; Antić (yellow card) 48'; Trifunović 76'; Jovančić (yellow card) 80'; Kovačević (yellow card) 89'	Stadium: Partizan Stadium; Attendance: 7,000; Referee: Milan Ilić

10 August 2016 4	Javor	0 – 2	Partizan	Ivanjica
18:30 CEST (UTC+2)	Gafurov (yellow card) 36'	Report; Summary	Radović 13'; Luiz (yellow card) 27'; Mihajlović 71' (pen.); Balažic (yellow card) 90'	Stadium: Ivanjica Stadium; Attendance: 2,000; Referee: Aleksandar Vasić

14 August 2016 5	Partizan	1 – 0	Čukarički	Belgrade
17:00 CEST (UTC+2)	Bojinov 26' (yellow card) 35'; Miletić (yellow card) 73'	Report; Summary	Lucas (yellow card) 13'; Mašović (yellow card) 22'	Stadium: Partizan Stadium; Attendance: 4,126; Referee: Srđan Jovanović

20 August 2016 6	Spartak	2 – 1	Partizan	Novi Sad
19:00 CEST (UTC+2)	Makarić 67'; Milić 82'	Report; Summary	Đurđić (yellow card) 39'; Leonardo 79'; Bojinov (yellow card) 87'	Stadium: Karađorđe Stadium; Attendance: 4,000; Referee: Milorad Mažić

27 August 2016 7	Partizan	4 – 0	Rad	Belgrade
19:00 CEST (UTC+2)	Bojinov 3'; Luiz (yellow card) 19'; Milenković 23' (yellow card) 27'; Marjanović (yellow card) 37'; Leonardo 48'; Đurđević (yellow card) 57'; Radović 79'	Report; Summary	Ćulum (yellow card) 21'; Bates (yellow card) 38' (yellow-red card) 47'; Veselinović (yellow card) 41'; Jovanović (yellow card) 57'	Stadium: Partizan Stadium; Attendance: 4,000; Referee: Novak Simović

11 September 2016 8	Borac Čačak	0 – 2	Partizan	Čačak
19:00 CEST (UTC+2)	Mihajlov (yellow card) 10' (yellow-red card) 19'; Tanasin (yellow card) 79'	Report; Summary	Milenković (yellow card) 33'; Miletić 38'; Mihajlović 40'	Stadium: Čačak Stadium; Attendance: 6,000; Referee: Majo Vujović

17 September 2016 9	Partizan	1–0	Red Star	Belgrade
18:00 CEST (UTC+2)	Leonardo 89'	Report		Stadium: Partizan Stadium; Attendance: 25,000; Referee: Milorad Mažić

25 September 2016 10	Metalac	0–1	Partizan	Gornji Milanovac
17:00 CEST (UTC+2)		Report	Leonardo 61'	Stadium: Stadion Metalac; Attendance: 3,000; Referee: Milan Ilić

2 October 2016 11	Partizan	3–1	Mladost Lučani	Belgrade
19:00 CEST (UTC+2)	Leonardo 45'; Đurđević 60'; Bojinov 67'	Report	Bojović 56' (pen.)	Stadium: Partizan Stadium; Attendance: 3,000; Referee: Aleksandar Vasić

15 October 2016 12	Voždovac	0–3	Partizan	Belgrade
17:00 CEST (UTC+2)	Mihajlov (red card) 41'	Report	Leonardo 23'; Ostojić 55'; Everton Luiz 73'	Stadium: Voždovac Stadium; Attendance: 1,200; Referee: Milorad Mažić

22 October 2016 13	Partizan	1–1	Radnički Niš	Belgrade
19:00 CEST (UTC+2)	Đurđić 48'	Report	Pavkov 31'	Stadium: Partizan Stadium; Attendance: 3,000; Referee: Robert Kiš Čepegi

29 October 2016 14	Radnik Surdulica	1–3	Partizan	Surdulica
17:00 CEST (UTC+2)	Zlatanović 48'	Report	Đurđević 10' 76'; Leonardo 11'	Stadium: Surdulica City Stadium; Attendance: 2,000; Referee: Lazar Lukić

6 November 2016 15	Partizan	4–0	Novi Pazar	Belgrade
17:00 CET (UTC+1)	Janković 25'; Stevanović 37'; Đurđević 55'; Đuričković 84'	Report		Stadium: Partizan Stadium; Attendance: 2,500; Referee: Nenad Đokić

19 November 2016 16	Partizan	1–0	Bačka	Belgrade
15:00 CET (UTC+1)	Đurđević 78'	Report		Stadium: Partizan Stadium; Attendance: 2,000; Referee: Marko Srećković

25 November 2016 17	Partizan	3–2	Napredak	Belgrade
17:00 CET (UTC+1)	Đurđević (yellow card) 37' (yellow-red card); Leonardo 45+2' 55' (pen.); Stevanović 84'	Report	Gobeljić 20'; Vukanović 42'; Leković (yellow card) 54' (yellow-red card)	Stadium: Partizan Stadium; Attendance: 3,000; Referee: Nenad Đokić

30 November 2016 18	Vojvodina	0–0	Partizan	Novi Sad
18:00 CET (UTC+1)		Report		Stadium: Karađorđe Stadium; Attendance: 5,000; Referee: Danilo Grujić

4 December 2016 19	Partizan	2–0	Javor	Belgrade
18:00 CET (UTC+1)	Đurđević 31'; Leonardo 47'	Report		Stadium: Partizan Stadium; Attendance: 2,000; Referee: Robert Kiš Čepegi

11 December 2016 20	Čukarički	1–3	Partizan	Belgrade
16:30 CET (UTC+1)	Ožegović 35' (pen.)	Report	Đurđević 1' 50' 61'	Stadium: Čukarički Stadium; Attendance: 3,000; Referee: Milorad Mažić

15 December 2016 21	Partizan	2–0	Spartak	Belgrade
16:00 CET (UTC+1)	Leonardo 54' 63'	Report		Stadium: Partizan Stadium; Attendance: 1,500; Referee: Srđan Jovanović

19 February 2017 22	Rad	0–1	Partizan	Belgrade
14:00 CET (UTC+1)		Report	Đurđević 55'	Stadium: King Peter I Stadium; Attendance: 2,000; Referee: Srđan Jovanović

25 February 2017 23	Partizan	2–1	Borac Čačak	Belgrade
17:00 CET (UTC+1)	Kosović 26'; Leonardo 34' (pen.)	Report	Mihajlović 66' (pen.)	Stadium: Partizan Stadium; Attendance: 3,000; Referee: Ilija Brdar

4 March 2017 24	Red Star	1–1	Partizan	Belgrade
18:00 CET (UTC+1)	Kanga 34'	Report	Đurđević 88'	Stadium: Rajko Mitić Stadium; Attendance: 41,132; Referee: Majo Vujović

8 March 2017 25	Partizan	3–0	Metalac	Belgrade
15:30 CET (UTC+1)	Tawamba 43'; Đurđević 61'; Đuričković 90+1'	Report		Stadium: Partizan Stadium; Attendance: 2,000; Referee: Zoran Široki

12 March 2017 26	Mladost Lučani	0–2	Partizan	Lučani
13:00 CET (UTC+1)		Report	Leonardo 42'; Đurđević 75'	Stadium: Mladost Stadium; Attendance: 2,000; Referee: Danilo Grujić

18 March 2017 27	Partizan	4–0	Voždovac	Belgrade
17:00 CET (UTC+1)	Đurđević 9' 62' (pen.); Leonardo 44'; Milenković 54'	Report		Stadium: Partizan Stadium; Attendance: 2,574; Referee: Zoran Široki

1 April 2017 28	Radnički Niš	0–2	Partizan	Niš
18:30 CEST (UTC+2)		Report	Đurđević 70'; Leonardo 90+2'	Stadium: Čair Stadium; Attendance: 8,000; Referee: Lazar Lukić

8 April 2017 29	Partizan	2–1	Radnik Surdulica	Belgrade
17:00 CEST (UTC+2)	Janković 53'; Đurđević 78' (pen.)	Report	Arsenijević 18'	Stadium: Partizan Stadium; Attendance: 1,500; Referee: Srđan Obradović

13 April 2017 30	Novi Pazar	1–3	Partizan	Novi Pazar
17:00 CEST (UTC+2)	Marković 3'	Report	Đurđević 52'; Leonardo 71'; Jevtović 90+2'	Stadium: Novi Pazar City Stadium; Attendance: 3,000; Referee: Zoran Široki

==== Championship round ====
===== Table =====
Pos	Team	Pld	W	D	L	GF	GA	GD	Pts	Qualification
1	Partizan (C)	37	30	4	3	78	22	+56	58	Qualification for the Champions League second qualifying round
2	Red Star Belgrade	37	30	4	3	93	33	+60	55	Qualification for the Europa League first qualifying round (Note: Since the winners of the 2016–17 Serbian Cup, Partizan, qualified for European competition based on league position, the spot awarded to the cup winners (Europa League first qualifying round) was passed to the fourth-placed team.)
3	Vojvodina	37	22	6	9	58	31	+27	43	Qualification for the Europa League first qualifying round
4	Mladost Lučani	37	18	6	13	46	44	+2	36	Qualification for the Europa League first qualifying round
5	Radnički Niš	37	15	9	13	47	46	+1	32	
6	Napredak Kruševac	37	16	8	13	44	36	+8	30	
7	Voždovac	37	14	6	17	41	51	−10	27	
8	Javor Ivanjica	37	11	10	16	34	50	−16	22	

Source: UEFA, Soccereway
Rules for classification: 1) Points; 1) Points in regular season; 2) Head-to-head points in regular season; 3) Head-to-head goal difference in regular season; 4) Head-to-head goals scored in regular season; 5) Head-to-head away goals scored in regular season (if two teams tied); 6) Goal difference; 7) Goals scored; 8) Fairplay ranking; 9) Play-off (if two teams tied and need to decide champion or teams for UEFA competitions); 10) Draw.
(C) Champions

===== Results by matchday =====
Matchday	1	2	3	4	5	6	7
Ground	A	H	H	A	H	A	H
Result	W	W	W	W	W	W	W
Position	2	2	2	1	1	1	1

Updated to match(es) played on 21 May 2017. Source: superliga.rs
A = Away; H = Home; W = Win; D = Draw; L = Loss

===== Results =====
18 April 2017 31	Red Star	1 – 3	Partizan	Belgrade
18:30 CEST (UTC+2)	Boakye 48' (yellow card) 84'; Donald (yellow card) 49'; Le Tallec (yellow card) 60'; Frimpong (yellow card) 89'	Report; Summary	Leonardo 21', 79' (yellow card) 49'; Luiz (yellow card) 49'; Tawamba 68'; Jevtović (yellow card) 90'	Stadium: Rajko Mitić Stadium; Attendance: 27,000; Referee: Danilo Grujić

22 April 2017 32	Partizan	1 – 0	Vojvodina	Belgrade
18:00 CEST (UTC+2)	Đurđević 1'; Janković (yellow card) 49'; Radin (yellow card) 89'	Report; Summary	Račić (yellow card) 7'	Stadium: Partizan Stadium; Attendance: 15,000; Referee: Milorad Mažić

30 April 2017 33	Partizan	3 – 1	Napredak Kruševac	Belgrade
17:00 CEST (UTC+2)	Janković 46'; Kosović 57' (yellow card) 90'; Leonardo 74'	Report; Summary	Kasalica 90+2'	Stadium: Partizan Stadium; Attendance: 10,000; Referee: Vlado Glođović

5 May 2017 34	Javor Ivanjica	1 – 2	Partizan	Ivanjica
21:00 CEST (UTC+2)	Đogatović (yellow card) 54'; Eliomar (yellow card) 60' (goal) 62'	Report; Summary	Đurđević 47', 55' (pen.); Jevtović (yellow card) 90'; Stevanović (yellow card) 90'	Stadium: Ivanjica Stadium; Attendance: 2,000; Referee: Aleksandar Vasić

13 May 2017 35	Partizan	2 – 1	Voždovac	Belgrade
18:00 CEST (UTC+2)	Leonardo 47'; Ostojić (yellow card) 60'; Đurđević 73' (pen.)	Report; Summary	Georgijević 19'; Putinčanin (yellow card) 31'	Stadium: Partizan Stadium; Referee: Dragan Čolović

17 May 2017 36	Radnički Niš	1 – 3	Partizan	Niš
20:00 CEST (UTC+2)	Tomić (yellow card) 75'; Živković 85'	Report; Summary	Ćirković (yellow card) 45'; Leonardo 55'; Tawamba (yellow card) 55'; Đurđević 58', 78'; Jevtović (yellow card) 70'; Đuričković (yellow card) 82'	Stadium: Čair Stadium; Attendance: 15,000; Referee: Zoran Široki

21 May 2017 37	Partizan	5 – 0	Mladost Lučani	Belgrade
19:30 CEST (UTC+2)	Leonardo 18', 66'; Jevtović 38'; Janković 70'; Kosović 81'	Report; Summary	Saničanin (yellow card) 24'	Stadium: Partizan Stadium; Attendance: 26,785; Referee: Milorad Mažić

=== Serbian Cup ===
21 September 2016 First round	Partizan	3 – 1	Napredak Kruševac	Belgrade
18:00 CEST (UTC+2)	Đurđević 20', 36'; Đurđić (yellow card) 24'; Leonardo 26'; Luiz (yellow card) 83'; Miletić (yellow card) 89'; Vlahović (yellow card) 90+1'	Report; Summary	Urošević (yellow card) 50'; Vukanović 57'; Vulić (yellow card) 63'; Sekidika (yellow card) 66' (yellow-red card) 71'	Stadium: Partizan Stadium; Attendance: 3,000; Referee: Ilija Brdar

25 October 2016 Second round	Žarkovo	0 – 2	Partizan	Belgrade
13:00 CEST (UTC+2)		Report; Summary	Bojinov 48', 71' (yellow card) 49'	Stadium: King Peter I Stadium; Attendance: 1,500; Referee: Dragan Čolović

5 April 2017 Quarter-final	Voždovac	1 – 2	Partizan	Belgrade
13:00 CEST (UTC+2)	Srećković 42'	Report; Summary	Đurđević 80'; Leonardo 90'	Stadium: Voždovac Stadium; Attendance: 1,000; Referee: Dragan Čolović

26 April 2017 Semifinal 1st leg	Vojvodina	0 – 0	Partizan	Novi Sad
19:00 CEST (UTC+2)		Report; Summary		Stadium: Karađorđe Stadium; Attendance: 7,000; Referee: Danilo Grujić

10 May 2017 Semifinal 2nd leg	Partizan	1 – 0 (1 – 0 agg.)	Vojvodina	Belgrade
19:00 CEST (UTC+2)	Đurđević 44'; Miletić (yellow card) 48'; Kosović (yellow card) 58'; Radin (yellow card) 65'	Report; Summary		Stadium: Partizan Stadium; Attendance: 22,256; Referee: Milorad Mažić

27 May 2017 Final	Partizan	1 – 0	Red Star	Belgrade
18:00 CEST (UTC+2)	Ostojić (yellow card) 1'; Leonardo (yellow card) 35'; Milenković 42'; Vulićević (yellow card) 63'; El Monir (yellow card) 75'; Janković (yellow card) 79'; Đuričković (yellow card) 90+5'	Report; Summary	Donald (yellow card) 35'; Plavšić (yellow card) 67'	Stadium: Partizan Stadium; Attendance: 20,000; Referee: Milorad Mažić

=== UEFA Europa League ===
==== Qualifying rounds ====
14 July 2016 Second qualifying round 1st leg	Partizan (Serbia)	0 – 0	(Poland) Zagłębie Lubin	Belgrade, Serbia
20:15 CEST (UTC+2)	Luiz (yellow card) 28'	Report	Papadopulos (yellow card) 44' (yellow-red card) 56'; Woźniak (yellow card) 90+3'	Stadium: Partizan Stadium; Attendance: 15,870; Referee: Eitan Shemeulevitch (Israel)

21 July 2016 Second qualifying round 2nd leg	Zagłębie Lubin (Poland)	0 – 0 (0 – 0 agg.) (4 – 3 p)	(Serbia) Partizan	Lubin, Poland
21:05 CEST (UTC+2)	Čotra (yellow card) 6'; Woźniak (yellow card) 32'; Dąbrowski (yellow card) 57'; Janoszka (yellow card) 72'	Report	Gogoua (yellow card) 86'; Radović (yellow card) 88'; Ilić (yellow card) 101'; Luiz (yellow card) 103'	Stadium: Stadion Zagłębia Lubin; Attendance: 11,279; Referee: Anatoliy Abdula (Ukraine)
	Penalties
	Janus (penalty scored); Guldan (penalty scored); Todorovski (penalty missed); Woźniak (penalty scored); Vlasko (penalty scored)		(penalty missed) Brašanac; (penalty scored) Ilić; (penalty scored) Đuričković; (penalty scored) Janković; (penalty missed) Mihajlović

== Squad statistics ==
As of Match played 27 May 2017

=== Appearances and goals ===
No.	Pos	Nat	Player	Total		SuperLiga		Serbian Cup		Europa League	
No.	Pos	Nat	Player	Apps	Goals	Apps	Goals	Apps	Goals	Apps	Goals
3	FW	(Cameroon) CMR	Léandre Tawamba	18	2	10+5	2	3	0	0	0
4	DF	(Serbia) SRB	Miroslav Vulićević	43	0	35	0	6	0	2	0
6	DF	(Serbia) SRB	Lazar Ćirković	1	0	1	0	0	0	0	0
7	MF	(Serbia) SRB	Nemanja Mihajlović	30	2	12+13	2	3	0	2	0
8	FW	(Serbia) SRB	Vladimir Đilas	2	0	0+2	0	0	0	0	0
9	FW	(Serbia) SRB	Dušan Vlahović	9	0	1+6	0	0+1	0	0+1	0
11	MF	(Serbia) SRB	Petar Đuričković	20	2	2+13	2	1+3	0	0+1	0
12	GK	(Serbia) SRB	Filip Kljajić	30	0	27	0	3	0	0	0
13	DF	(Libya) LBA	Mohamed El Monir	5	0	2+1	0	2	0	0	0
17	MF	(Serbia) SRB	Saša Marjanović	8	0	4+2	0	1	0	0+1	0
21	MF	(Serbia) SRB	Marko Jevtović	29	2	24	2	3+2	0	0	0
22	MF	(Serbia) SRB	Saša Ilić	26	0	6+16	0	0+3	0	0+1	0
23	DF	(Serbia) SRB	Bojan Ostojić	30	1	23+1	1	6	0	0	0
25	MF	(Brazil) BRA	Everton Luiz	33	1	28	1	3	0	2	0
26	DF	(Serbia) SRB	Nemanja Miletić	36	1	32	1	3+1	0	0	0
27	MF	(Montenegro) MNE	Nebojša Kosović	22	3	11+5	3	5+1	0	0	0
29	MF	(Serbia) SRB	Milan Radin	12	0	3+5	0	1+3	0	0	0
31	DF	(Serbia) SRB	Nikola Milenković	40	3	32	2	6	1	2	0
32	FW	(Serbia) SRB	Uroš Đurđević	34	28	28+1	24	5	4	0	0
42	MF	(Brazil) BRA	Leonardo	38	26	31+3	24	3+1	2	0	0
85	GK	(Serbia) SRB	Nemanja Stevanović	7	0	4	0	3	0	0	0
91	MF	(Serbia) SRB	Alen Stevanović	19	2	11+6	2	1	0	0+1	0
95	MF	(Montenegro) MNE	Marko Janković	38	4	23+7	4	4+2	0	2	0
99	FW	(Serbia) SRB	Đorđe Jovanović	7	0	0+7	0	0	0	0	0
Players away from Partizan on loan:
Players who left Partizan during the season:
6	DF	(Slovenia) SLO	Gregor Balažic	15	0	15	0	0	0	0	0
8	MF	(Serbia) SRB	Darko Brašanac	6	0	2+2	0	0	0	2	0
10	MF	(Serbia) SRB	Miroslav Radović	9	2	6+1	2	0	0	2	0
14	DF	(Serbia) SRB	Miroslav Bogosavac	6	0	3	0	1	0	2	0
19	MF	(Serbia) SRB	Uroš Damnjanović	1	0	0	0	0+1	0	0	0
40	FW	(Serbia) SRB	Nikola Đurđić	17	1	7+6	1	2	0	2	0
50	GK	(Serbia) SRB	Bojan Šaranov	8	0	6	0	0	0	2	0
51	DF	(Ivory Coast) CIV	Cédric Gogoua	5	0	3	0	0	0	2	0
86	FW	(Bulgaria) BUL	Valeri Bojinov	22	7	15+5	5	1	2	0+1	0

=== Goal scorers ===
Place	Position	Nation	Number	Name	SuperLiga	Serbian Cup	Europa League	Total
1	FW	(Serbia)	32	Uroš Đurđević	24	4	0	28
2	MF	(Brazil)	42	Leonardo	24	2	0	26
3	FW	(Bulgaria)	86	Valeri Bojinov	5	2	0	7
4	MF	(Montenegro)	95	Marko Janković	4	0	0	4
5	MF	(Montenegro)	27	Nebojša Kosović	3	0	0	3
5	DF	(Serbia)	31	Nikola Milenković	2	1	0	3
7	MF	(Serbia)	10	Miroslav Radović	2	0	0	2
7	MF	(Serbia)	7	Nemanja Mihajlović	2	0	0	2
7	MF	(Serbia)	91	Alen Stevanović	2	0	0	2
7	MF	(Serbia)	11	Petar Đuričković	2	0	0	2
7	FW	(Cameroon)	3	Léandre Tawamba	2	0	0	2
7	MF	(Serbia)	21	Marko Jevtović	2	0	0	2
13	DF	(Serbia)	26	Nemanja Miletić	1	0	0	1
13	DF	(Serbia)	23	Bojan Ostojić	1	0	0	1
13	MF	(Brazil)	25	Everton Luiz	1	0	0	1
13	FW	(Serbia)	40	Nikola Đurđić	1	0	0	1
				TOTALS	81	9	0	90

=== Disciplinary record ===
Number	Nation	Position	Name	SuperLiga		Serbian Cup		Europa League		Total	
Number	Nation	Position	Name	Yellow card	Red card	Yellow card	Red card	Yellow card	Red card	Yellow card	Red card
4	(Serbia)	DF	Miroslav Vulićević	0	0	1	0	0	0	1	0
9	(Serbia)	FW	Dušan Vlahović	0	0	1	0	0	0	1	0
10	(Serbia)	MF	Miroslav Radović	0	0	0	0	1	0	1	0
11	(Serbia)	MF	Petar Đuričković	0	0	1	0	0	0	1	0
13	(Libya)	DF	Mohamed El Monir	0	0	1	0	0	0	1	0
22	(Serbia)	MF	Saša Ilić	0	0	0	0	1	0	1	0
23	(Serbia)	DF	Bojan Ostojić	0	0	1	0	0	0	1	0
25	(Brazil)	MF	Everton Luiz	0	0	1	0	2	0	3	0
26	(Serbia)	DF	Nemanja Miletić	0	0	2	0	0	0	2	0
27	(Montenegro)	MF	Nebojša Kosović	0	0	1	0	0	0	1	0
29	(Serbia)	MF	Milan Radin	0	0	1	0	0	0	1	0
40	(Serbia)	FW	Nikola Đurđić	0	0	1	0	0	0	1	0
42	(Brazil)	MF	Leonardo	0	0	1	0	0	0	1	0
51	(Ivory Coast)	DF	Cédric Gogoua	0	0	0	0	1	0	1	0
86	(Bulgaria)	FW	Valeri Bojinov	0	0	1	0	0	0	1	0
95	(Montenegro)	MF	Marko Janković	0	0	1	0	0	0	1	0
			TOTALS	0	0	14	0	5	0	19	0
