= Bojan Ostojić =

Serbian footballer (born 1984)

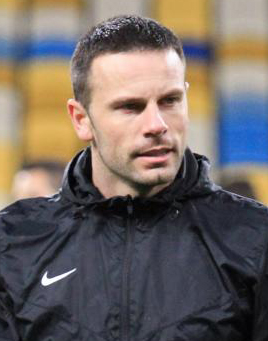
- Ostojić with Partizan in 2017

Personal information
- Date of birth: 12 February 1984 (age 42)
- Place of birth: Sevojno, SR Serbia, SFR Yugoslavia
- Height: 1.84 m (6 ft 0 in)
- Position: Centre-back

Team information
- Current team: Napredak Kruševac (assistant)

Youth career
- 1991–2002: Sevojno

Senior career*
Years	Team	Apps	(Gls)
2002–2006	Sevojno	39	(2)
2005–2006	→ Sloboda Užice (loan)	31	(2)
2006–2008	Sloboda Užice	54	(3)
2008–2009	Radnički Kragujevac	29	(1)
2009–2010	Sloboda Užice	27	(2)
2010–2011	BASK	30	(3)
2011–2012	Novi Pazar	11	(0)
2012–2013	Voždovac	34	(3)
2013–2016	Čukarički	78	(3)
2016–2022	Partizan	89	(3)
2022–2023	Teleoptik	12	(1)
Total		434	(23)

Managerial career
- 2023–2024: Smederevo 1924 (assistant)
- 2024–2025: Voždovac (assistant)
- 2025–2026: Sloboda Užice
- 2026–: Napredak Kruševac (assistant)
- * Club domestic league appearances and goals

Bojan Ostojić (Serbian Cyrillic: Бојан Остојић; born 12 February 1984) is a Serbian professional football manager and player who played as a centre-back.

== Career ==
=== Early years ===
Ostojić started out at his hometown club Sevojno, making his senior debut in 2002. He was subsequently transferred to Sloboda Užice on a season-long loan, before permanently joining them in 2006. After two more seasons at Begluk, Ostojić moved to Radnički Kragujevac in July 2008. He spent one season at Čika Dača, before returning to Sloboda.

In the summer of 2010, Ostojić joined BASK, immediately helping them win the Serbian First League. However, they withdrew from the Serbian SuperLiga, ceding their spot to Novi Pazar. Simultaneously, numerous players were transferred in the same way, including Ostojić. He made his debut in the top flight of Serbian football on 13 August 2011, playing the full 90 minutes in a 5–0 away loss against Partizan. In the 2012–13 season, Ostojić was a regular member of Voždovac, appearing in all of his team's 34 league fixtures and scoring three goals in the process.

=== Čukarički ===
In the summer of 2013, Ostojić signed with SuperLiga newcomers Čukarički. He spent the following three seasons at the club, making 92 appearances and scoring four goals in all competitions, while helping them win the Serbian Cup in 2015. In the 2015–16 campaign, Ostojić was named in the league's team of the season, alongside his two teammates.

=== Partizan ===
==== 2016–17 season ====
On 1 July 2016, Ostojić signed a one-plus-one-year contract with Partizan. He made his competitive debut for the club on 31 July, playing the full 90 minutes in a 2–1 away league loss to Napredak Kruševac. On 15 October, Ostojić scored his first goal for Partizan in a 3–0 away league win against his former club Voždovac. He subsequently established a formidable central defense partnership with Nikola Milenković, helping Partizan win the double. Due to his consistent performances throughout the season, Ostojić was named in the league's best eleven for the second year in a row.

==== 2017–18 season ====
In June 2017, Ostojić extended his contract with Partizan for two more years. He opened the season with a header from Petar Đuričković's 89th-minute corner to give his team a 1–0 win over Vojvodina on 13 August. During a league game versus Rad on 7 March 2018, Ostojić suffered a ligament injury that caused him to miss the rest of the season.

==== 2018–19 season ====
In June 2018, Ostojić was reportedly negotiating with some Cypriot and Turkish clubs, but the transfer never went through. He eventually remained at Partizan, managing to appear in just one Serbian Cup game during the first half of the season. After the appointment of Savo Milošević as manager, Ostojić started receiving more playing time. He scored the only goal in the 2019 Serbian Cup final against arch-rivals Red Star Belgrade to help Partizan win the trophy for the fourth consecutive time.

==== 2019–20 season ====
In June 2019, Ostojić turned down an offer from Vojvodina and extended his contract with Partizan for another year. He made 37 appearances across all competitions during the 2019–20 season, scoring a goal in a 6–2 home league win over Javor Ivanjica.

== Career statistics ==
As of 8 June 2023

Appearances and goals by club, season and competition
Club	Season	League			Cup		Continental		Total	
Club	Season	Division	Apps	Goals	Apps	Goals	Apps	Goals	Apps	Goals
Sevojno	2003–04	Serbian League West	22	2	—		—		22	2
Sevojno	2004–05	Serbian League West	17	0	—		—		17	0
Sevojno	Total		39	2	—		—		39	2
Sloboda Užice (loan)	2005–06	Serbian League West	31	2	—		—		31	2
Sloboda Užice	2006–07	Serbian League West	30	1	—		—		30	1
Sloboda Užice	2007–08	Serbian League West	24	2	—		—		24	2
Sloboda Užice	Total		54	3	—		—		54	3
Radnički Kragujevac	2008–09	Serbian League West	29	1	—		—		29	1
Sloboda Užice	2009–10	Serbian League West	27	2	—		—		27	2
BASK	2010–11	Serbian First League	30	3	—		—		30	3
Novi Pazar	2011–12	Serbian SuperLiga	11	0	1	0	—		12	0
Voždovac	2012–13	Serbian First League	34	3	—		—		34	3
Čukarički	2013–14	Serbian SuperLiga	23	1	1	0	—		24	1
Čukarički	2014–15	Serbian SuperLiga	21	0	5	1	3	0	29	1
Čukarički	2015–16	Serbian SuperLiga	34	2	1	0	4	0	39	2
Čukarički	Total		78	3	7	1	7	0	92	4
Partizan	2016–17	Serbian SuperLiga	24	1	6	0	0	0	30	1
Partizan	2017–18	Serbian SuperLiga	18	1	2	0	10	0	30	1
Partizan	2018–19	Serbian SuperLiga	9	0	4	1	0	0	13	1
Partizan	2019–20	Serbian SuperLiga	24	1	2	0	11	0	37	1
Partizan	2020–21	Serbian SuperLiga	9	0	2	0	2	0	13	0
Partizan	2021–22	Serbian SuperLiga	5	0	2	0	0	0	7	0
Partizan	Total		89	3	18	1	23	0	130	4
Teleoptik	2022–23	Serbian League Belgrade	12	1	—		—		12	1
Career total			434	23	26	2	30	0	490	25

== Honours ==
BASK

- Serbian First League: 2010–11

Čukarički

- Serbian Cup: 2014–15

Partizan

- Serbian SuperLiga: 2016–17
- Serbian Cup: 2016–17, 2017–18, 2018–19

Individual

- Serbian SuperLiga Team of the Season: 2015–16, 2016–17
