= Nemanja Miletić =

Nemanja Miletić may refer to:

- Nemanja Miletić (footballer, born January 1991), Serbian association football player who plays for Omonia
- Nemanja Miletić (footballer, born July 1991), Serbian association football player who plays for FK Partizan
