= Uroš Đurđević =

Footballer (born 1994)

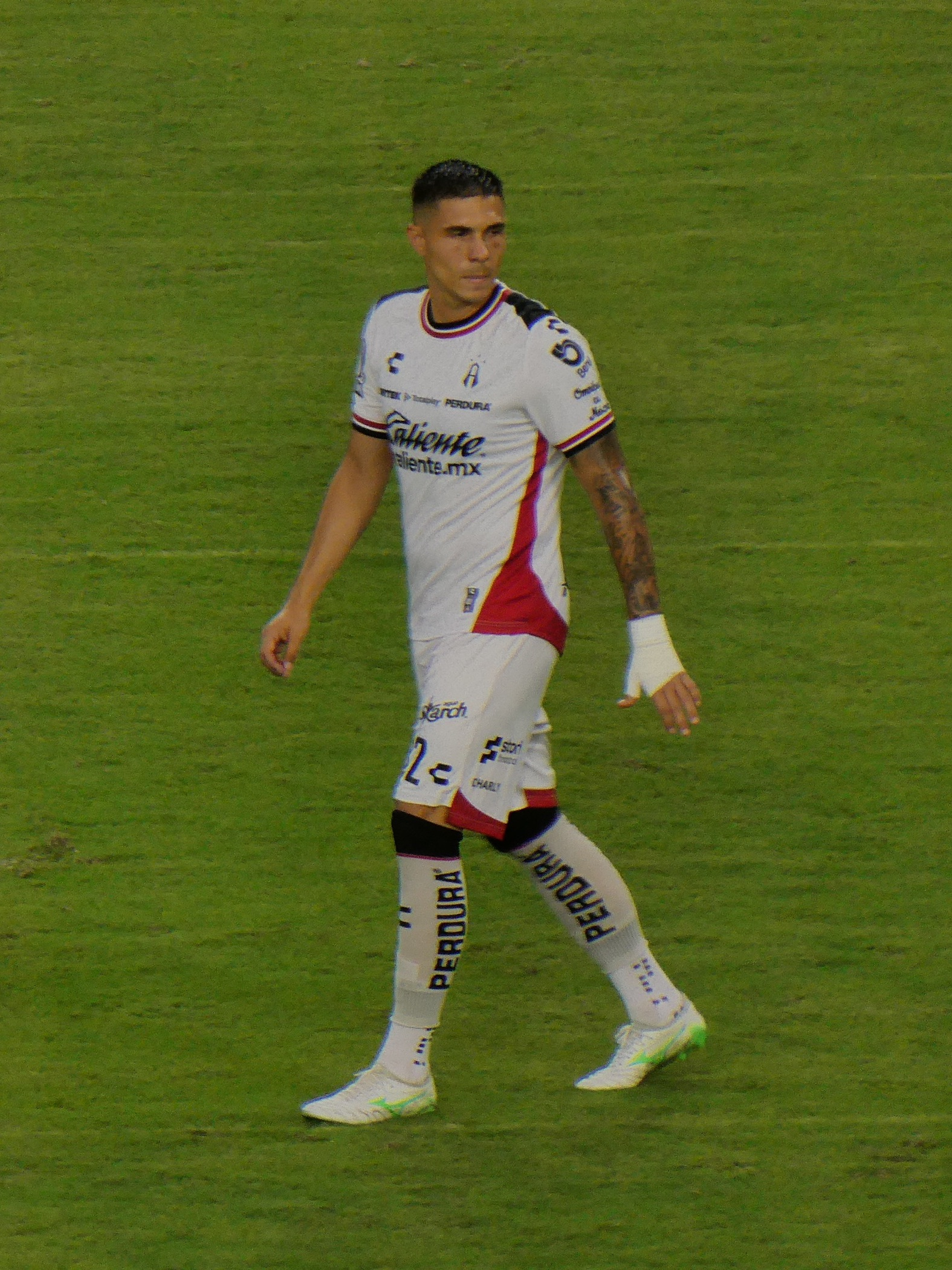
- Đurđević with Atlas in 2025

Personal information
- Date of birth: 2 March 1994 (age 32)
- Place of birth: Belgrade, FR Yugoslavia
- Height: 1.78 m (5 ft 10 in)
- Position: Striker

Team information
- Current team: Monterrey
- Number: 32

Youth career
- 1999–2005: Obrenovac 1905
- Red Star Belgrade
- OFK Beograd
- 2008–2011: Rad

Senior career*
Years	Team	Apps	(Gls)
2011–2013	Rad	41	(11)
2014–2015	Vitesse	25	(1)
2015–2016	Palermo	14	(2)
2016–2017	Partizan	34	(27)
2017–2018	Olympiacos	19	(4)
2018–2024	Sporting Gijón	219	(62)
2024–2026	Atlas	47	(21)
2026–	Monterrey	16	(3)

International career^{‡}
2012–2013	Serbia U19 (Note: Only official UEFA matches included)	14	(3)
2013–2017	Serbia U21	30	(16)
2021–2023	Montenegro	12	(0)
Medal record
Gold medal – first place	UEFA Under-19 Championship	2013
- * Club domestic league appearances and goals as of 5 November 2026 ‡ National team caps and goals as of 11 September 2023

Uroš Đurđević (Serbian Cyrillic: Урош Ђурђевић, pronounced [ǔroʃ dʑûrdʑeʋitɕ]; born 2 March 1994) is a professional footballer who plays as a striker for Liga MX club Monterrey. Born in Serbia, he plays for the Montenegro national team.

== Club career ==
=== Early years ===
Đurđević made his first football steps at Obrenovac 1905, before joining the youth system of Red Star Belgrade. He also briefly played for OFK Beograd, before joining the youth setup of Rad.

=== Rad ===
Đurđević made his senior debut for Rad on 28 August 2011, under manager Slavko Petrović, coming on as a substitute for Luka Milivojević in a 1–2 home league loss to Sloboda Užice. He appeared in a total of seven league games in his debut season, exclusively as a substitute. On 17 November 2012, Đurđević scored his first ever senior goal for Rad, giving his team a 1–0 home league win over Hajduk Kula. He netted a total of nine league goals in the 2012–13 campaign, led by Marko Nikolić, helping his team finish middle of the table. Despite numerous speculation during the 2013 summer transfer window, Đurđević eventually stayed with the Građevinari until the end of the year.

=== Vitesse ===
In January 2014, Đurđević joined Dutch club Vitesse and was given the number 9 shirt. He made his Eredivisie debut on 7 February 2014, entering the match as an 88th-minute substitute for Lucas Piazon in a 0–0 home draw with ADO Den Haag. Until the end of the 2013–14 Eredivisie, Đurđević made five more appearances, coming on as a substitute in all five games, but failed to score any goals.

On 30 July 2014, Đurđević scored the last goal in a 1–3 friendly loss to Chelsea. He was still struggling to earn a first team spot in the 2014–15 campaign, despite scoring regularly for the reserves. On 1 February 2015, two minutes after replacing Bertrand Traoré, Đurđević scored the only goal in the 85th minute to give Vitesse a 1–0 win over Ajax. The goal was compared to Dennis Bergkamp's one against Newcastle United from 2002.

After featuring in two games early into the 2015–16 season, Đurđević terminated his contract with Vitesse by mutual agreement on 14 August 2015.

=== Palermo ===
On 18 August 2015, Đurđević was signed by Italian club Palermo. He marked his Serie A debut by scoring an 88th-minute equalizer after coming off the bench in a 2–2 home draw with Carpi on 13 September 2015. Unfortunately, in his second appearance for the Rosanero, Đurđević fractured his ankle in a game against Milan at San Siro on 19 September 2015. He returned to action on 12 December 2015, being substituted at half-time by Alberto Gilardino, in an eventual 4–1 win over Frosinone at the Stadio Renzo Barbera. On 7 February 2016, Đurđević scored his second goal in Serie A, netting the equalizer in a 2–2 draw against Sassuolo. He collected a total of 14 league appearances and scored two times in the 2015–16 campaign.

=== Partizan ===
==== 2016–17 season ====
On 22 August 2016, Đurđević returned to his homeland and signed with Partizan, on a three-year deal. He made his debut for the club on 27 August, coming on as a second-half substitute for Valeri Bojinov in a 4–0 home win over his former club Rad. On 21 September, Đurđević scored his first two goals for Partizan in a 3–1 Serbian Cup win over Napredak Kruševac. He scored his first goal in the league on 2 October in a 3–1 home win over Mladost Lučani. On 11 December, Đurđević netted a hat-trick to lead Partizan to a 3–1 win away at Čukarički. He opened the scoring after just 10 seconds into the match, setting the record for the fastest ever goal in the top flight of Serbian football. On 4 March 2017, Đurđević scored his first goal in the Belgrade derby, heading in Miroslav Vulićević's cross in the 88th minute of a 1–1 away draw. He found the back of the net seven times in the next six fixtures, eventually finishing the campaign as the league's top scorer with 24 goals, as well as his teammate Leonardo, helping Partizan win the title. His performances also earned him the league's Player of the Season award and selection in the competition's Team of the Season. In the second part of the season, Đurđević also scored two more goals in the Serbian Cup, as the club collected the double.

==== 2017–18 season ====
On 11 July 2017, Đurđević scored his first goal in UEFA competitions, converting a penalty kick in a 2–0 home win over Budućnost Podgorica in the first leg of the Champions League second qualifying round. He subsequently netted once in the league's opener versus Mačva Šabac on 22 July, an eventual 6–1 home victory. On 2 August, Đurđević scored an 85th-minute equalizer to give his team a 2–2 draw against Olympiacos in the return leg of the Champions League third qualifying round, as Partizan were eliminated 3–5 on aggregate. He eventually helped the side reach the group stage of the Europa League after scoring a brace in a 4–0 victory away at Videoton in the competition's play-off round second leg.

=== Olympiacos ===
On 30 August 2017, Đurđević was transferred to Greek club Olympiacos for €2.5 million plus 15% from future transfer fee. He made his league debut for the side in a 1–1 away draw against Xanthi on 9 September, being substituted for Emmanuel Emenike in the 60th minute. Three days later, Đurđević played 62 minutes on his Champions League debut, before being replaced by Emenike again in an eventual 3–2 home loss to Sporting CP. He scored his first goal for the club on 16 September, converting a penalty in second-half injury time against Asteras Tripolis in a 1–1 home draw. Throughout the 2017–18 season with Olympiacos, Đurđević made 30 appearances in all competitions and scored seven goals in the process.

=== Sporting Gijón ===
On 21 August 2018, Đurđević moved to Spain and joined Segunda División side Sporting Gijón. He became the most expensive transfer in the club's history, for an estimated amount of €2.5 million.

On 11 October 2020, after scoring three goals in the first three matches of the season, Đurđević was named Segunda División Player of the Month for September.

=== Atlas ===
On 17 July 2024, Đurđević moved to Mexico and joined Mexican side Atlas.

=== Monterrey ===
On 5 February 2026, he was transferred to Monterrey.

== International career ==
=== Youth ===
Initially, Đurđević represented Serbia at the 2012 UEFA Under-19 Championship, as the team exited the tournament at the group stage. He subsequently led them to the 2013 UEFA Under-19 Championship, scoring a brace against Slovakia in the elite qualifying round. At the final tournament, Đurđević was one of the team's most influential players, scoring the opening goal in the semi-final against Portugal, as they progressed through to the final after penalties. Serbia eventually won the title after defeating France 1–0 in the gold medal match.

On 22 March 2013, Đurđević made his debut for Serbia at under-21 level in a 1–2 friendly loss away against the Netherlands U21s. He scored his first goal for the team on 14 August 2013, in a 4–1 home friendly win over the Macedonia under-21 side. Afterwards, Đurđević was their regular member during the UEFA Under-21 Championship 2015 qualifying stage, as Serbia qualified to the final tournament. He ultimately declined a call-up by Mladen Dodić in order to better prepare for the next season.

In the UEFA Under-21 Championship 2017 qualifying stage, Đurđević was the team's top scorer with nine goals, while captaining the side on most occasions. He netted a hat-trick in a 3–1 home win over Slovenia in the final group match. In addition, Đurđević scored once in the first leg of the play-off round versus Norway, as Serbia ultimately secured a spot in the final tournament. He was named in the final 23-man squad by newly appointed manager Nenad Lalatović in May 2017. In the second match of the group stage, Đurđević scored a header late to earn a 2–2 draw with Macedonia. He concluded his youth national team career on 23 June 2017, receiving a red card during the first half of Serbia's game against Spain.

=== Senior ===
On 9 March 2017, Đurđević received his first call-up to the full squad by manager Slavoljub Muslin for Serbia's World Cup 2018 qualifier against Georgia. He was an unused substitute in an eventual 3–1 success.

In 2021, he became a citizen of Montenegro and accepted an invitation to the Montenegro national football team. His father was born in Titograd (now Podgorica, Montenegro), which was a condition cited for him becoming a Montenegrin citizen. He made his debut on 24 March 2021 in a World Cup qualifier against Latvia.

== Personal life ==
His younger brother, Kristijan (b. 1996), is also a footballer.

== Career statistics ==
=== Club ===
As of 1 June 2026

Appearances and goals by club, season and competition
Club	Season	League			National cup (Note: Includes Serbian Cup, KNVB Cup, Greek Football Cup, Copa del Rey)		Continental		Total	
Club	Season	Division	Apps	Goals	Apps	Goals	Apps	Goals	Apps	Goals
Rad	2011–12	Serbian SuperLiga	7	0	0	0	0	0	7	0
Rad	2012–13	Serbian SuperLiga	23	9	2	0	—		25	9
Rad	2013–14	Serbian SuperLiga	11	2	1	0	—		12	2
Rad	Total		41	11	3	0	0	0	44	11
Vitesse	2013–14	Eredivisie	6	0	0	0	0	0	6	0
Vitesse	2014–15	Eredivisie	18	1	1	0	—		19	1
Vitesse	2015–16	Eredivisie	1	0	0	0	1 (Note: Appearance in UEFA Europa League)	0	2	0
Vitesse	Total		25	1	1	0	1	0	27	1
Palermo	2015–16	Serie A	14	2	0	0	—		14	2
Partizan	2016–17	Serbian SuperLiga	29	24	5	4	—		34	28
Partizan	2017–18	Serbian SuperLiga	5	3	0	0	6 (Note: Four appearances and two goals in UEFA Champions League, two appearances and two goals in UEFA Europa League)	4	11	7
Partizan	Total		34	27	5	4	6	4	45	35
Olympiacos	2017–18	Super League Greece	19	4	6	3	5 (Note: Appearances in UEFA Champions League)	0	30	7
Sporting Gijón	2018–19	Segunda División	38	11	2	1	—		40	12
Sporting Gijón	2019–20	Segunda División	37	6	0	0	—		37	6
Sporting Gijón	2020–21	Segunda División	39	22	2	0	—		41	22
Sporting Gijón	2021–22	Segunda División	36	14	3	2	—		39	16
Sporting Gijón	2022–23	Segunda División	32	5	3	1	—		35	6
Sporting Gijón	2023–24	Segunda División	38	4	2	0	—		40	4
Sporting Gijón	Total		219	62	12	4	—		231	66
Atlas	2024–25	Liga MX	27	12	–		7	0	34	12
Atlas	2025–26	Liga MX	20	9	–		–		20	9
Atlas	Total		47	21	—		7	0	54	21
Career total			393	126	27	11	19	4	439	141

=== International ===
Appearances and goals by national team and year
National team	Year	Apps	Goals
Serbia U21	2013	7	2
Serbia U21	2014	6	3
Serbia U21	2015	3	2
Serbia U21	2016	10	8
Serbia U21	2017	4	1
Montenegro	2021	7	0
Montenegro	2022	3	0
Montenegro	2023	2	0
Total		42	16

== Honours ==
Partizan

- Serbian SuperLiga: 2016–17
- Serbian Cup: 2016–17

Serbia U19

- UEFA Under-19 Championship: 2013

Individual

- Serbian SuperLiga Top goalscorer: 2016–17
- Serbian SuperLiga Player of the Season: 2016–17
- Serbian SuperLiga Team of the Season: 2016–17
- Segunda División Player of the Month: September 2020
- Liga MX Top goalscorer: Clausura 2025

Records

- Serbia U21 all-time top scorer: 16 goals
