= Marko Jevtović (footballer) =

Serbian footballer

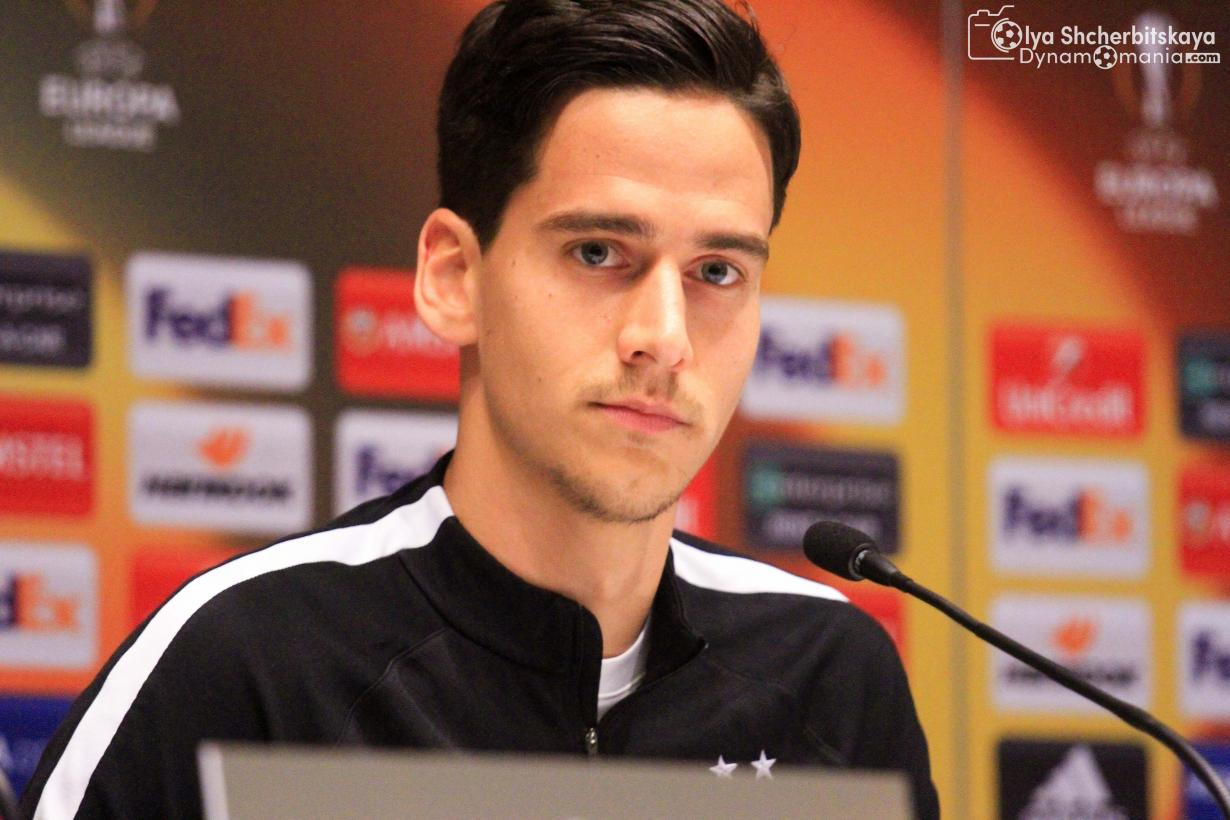
- Jevtović with Partizan in 2017

Personal information
- Date of birth: 24 July 1993 (age 33)
- Place of birth: Belgrade, FR Yugoslavia
- Height: 1.94 m (6 ft 4 in)
- Position: Defensive midfielder

Team information
- Current team: Konyaspor
- Number: 8

Youth career
- Zemun

Senior career*
Years	Team	Apps	(Gls)
2010–2011	Srem Jakovo	18	(1)
2011–2012	Dynamo Moscow	0	(0)
2012	Sopot	7	(0)
2013	Hajduk Kula	10	(0)
2013–2015	Novi Pazar	45	(3)
2015–2018	Partizan	73	(8)
2018–2021	Konyaspor	88	(9)
2021–2022	Al Ahli	10	(0)
2022	Partizan	13	(1)
2022–2024	Gaziantep	51	(6)
2024–	Konyaspor	63	(3)

International career^{‡}
2015	Serbia U23	1	(0)
2017	Serbia	1	(0)
- * Club domestic league appearances and goals as of 30 October 2026 ‡ National team caps and goals as of 29 January 2017

Marko Jevtović (Serbian Cyrillic: Марко Јевтовић; born 24 July 1993) is a Serbian professional footballer who plays as a midfielder for Süper Lig club Konyaspor.

== Club career ==
=== Early career ===
He started playing in esteemed youth ranks of Zemun. At the age of 18 he joined Dynamo Moscow, after playing a portion of 2010–2011 season for Srem Jakovo. After a brief spell in Russia's capital, he returned to Serbia, in Sopot. At the age of 19, he signed for Hajduk Kula. Due to rather severe financial issues, the club, that excelled during the latter stages of 2012–2013 Superliga season, ceased to exist.

=== Novi Pazar ===
Jevtović therefore had to move again, so he left for Novi Pazar. He made his first official debut for Novi Pazar on 17 August 2013, against Rad. In the 2013–14 season he played 18 matches (17 in Serbian SuperLiga and 1 in Serbian Cup), but did not achieve a single goal. On 29 September 2014, he scored his first goal for Novi Pazar against Jagodina in a 3–0 home win. It was also the most beautiful goal of the season 2014–15 in the Serbian Superliga. On 4 April 2015, he has scored from the penalty spot against the Red Star Belgrade in a 2–1 home win. In the 28th round of Serbian SuperLeague, he scored from penalty spot against Voždovac on 13 May 2015. 2014–15 season he finished with 28 appearances and 3 goals in Novi Pazar.

=== Partizan ===
==== 2015–16 season ====
Jevtović signed a four-year deal with Partizan on 3 June 2015. He was handed the number 21 shirt, previously worn by Saša Marković who played at the same position as Jevtović. Jevtović playing style reminds on former Partizan player, Radosav Petrović and many compare him to him. He made his first official debut for Partizan on 14 July 2015, against Dila Gori in the first leg of second round qualification for UEFA Champions League. Jevtović made his league debut against Metalac in a 4–0 home win on 17 July 2015. Jevtović scored the equalizer against Steaua București in third round qualification for UEFA Champions League in a 4–2 home win. Jevtović was sent off in injury time of first half on 18 August 2015 at Borisov Arena in a play-off round of UEFA Champions League against BATE Borisov. He played five matches in the 2015–16 UEFA Europa League group stage, against Athletic Bilbao, AZ and Augsburg. He played the vast majority of his team's games in the first part of the 2015–16 season, but in the second under newly appointed manager Ivan Tomić, he spent on the bench. He helped Partizan to win the 2015–16 Serbian Cup.

==== 2016–17 season ====
At the start of the 2016–17 season, he was not in the protocol in several matches. Jevtović played his first match in the new season, on 11 September and provide assist in a 2–0 away league victory over Borac Čačak. He played the vast majority of his team's games in the first part of the 2016–17 season. On 13 April, Jevtović scored his first goal for Partizan in SuperLiga, in a 3–1 away victory, over his former club, Novi Pazar. On 21 May, he scored his second goal in the season, in a 5–0 home win over Mladost Lučani and helping club to win 27th title.

==== 2017–18 season ====
Jevtović played his first match of the new season with a 6-1 win over Mačva Šabac on 22 July 2017. He scored his first goal of the season on 22 October 2017 in a 3-1 victory over OFK Bačka in the SuperLiga. On 23 May 2018, Jevtović made an assist in the Serbian Cup final match against Mladost Lučani in a 2-1 win and managed to win the cup with his team.

=== Konyaspor ===
==== 2018–19 season ====
Jevtović transferred to Turkish club Konyaspor in the 17 July 2018 and signed a 3-year contract. He made his debut with Konyaspor on August 12, 2018, with a 3-2 win in the league match against Erzurumspor F.K. Jevtović scored his first goal for Konyaspor on 27 January 2019 in a 2-0 win against Antalyaspor in the league match. He scored his second goal of the season on 6 May 2019 with a 2-4 win against Alanyaspor in the league match.

==== 2019–20 season ====
Jevtović drew 0-0 with Ankaragücü in the league match on August 18, 2019, in the first match of the new season. He scored his first goal of the season with a 2-1 win against Kayserispor on 29 September 2019 in the league match. Jevtović finished the season by scoring 3 goals.

==== 2020–21 season ====
On 19 September 2020, Jevtović played his first game of the 2020-21 season in a 0-0 draw against Genclerbirligi in the league competition. He managed to score his first goal of the season on 7 November 2020 with a 0-2 away win against Fenerbahçe in the league fight. Jevtović had a successful performance, finishing the season with 4 goals.

=== Al Ahli ===
Jevtović transferred to Qatar club Al Ahli on 10 July 2021 and signed a two-year contract. He made his official debut for Al Ahli in the cup competition against Al-Shamal on 6 September 2021 and managed to score a goal.

=== Partizan ===
Jevtović signed a two-and-a-half-year contract, transferring to his former club Partizan on February 1, 2022. He made his first official game with Partizan shirt in the 2021-22 season on February 12, 2022, with a 0-2 win against Radnički Niš in the league fight. He managed to score his first goal of the 2021-22 season with a 0-3 win over Napredak Kruševac in the league championship round fight on May 1, 2022.

=== Gaziantep ===
On 6 July 2022, Jevtović joined Gaziantep in Turkey on a two-year deal. Jevtović Gaziantep made his first official match on 6 August 2022, in a league match with Sivasspor to a 1-1 draw. He scored his first official goal for the club on August 20, 2022 in the league competition, with a 1-2 win against Hatayspor away.

== International career ==
Jevtović was called by coach Slavoljub Muslin to the Serbia national team in January 2017. On 29 January 2017, Jevtović made his international debut for the Serbia national football team in a friendly match against the United States in a 0–0 away draw in San Diego. In May 2018, Jevtović was omitted from Serbia's 23-man squad for the 2018 World Cup in Russia.

== Personal life ==
Marko's older brother, Luka, is a journalist, and a football analyzing specialist who works for Radio Television of Serbia.

== Honours ==
Partizan

- Serbian SuperLiga: 2016–17
- Serbian Cup: 2015–16, 2016–17, 2017–18
