= Mohamed El Monir =

Libyan footballer (born 1992)

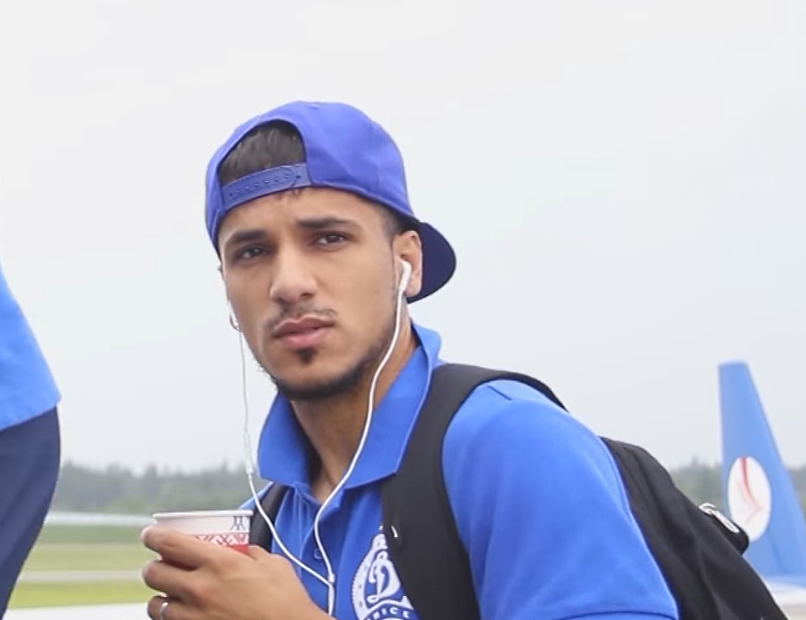
- El Monir with Dinamo Minsk in 2016

Personal information
- Full name: Mohamed El-Monir Abdessalam
- Date of birth: 8 April 1992 (age 34)
- Place of birth: Tripoli, Libya
- Height: 1.77 m (5 ft 9 1/2 in)
- Positions: Left back; left wing

Team information
- Current team: Al-Ahli Tripoli
- Number: 19

Youth career
- Al-Ittihad Tripoli

Senior career*
Years	Team	Apps	(Gls)
2010–2011	Al-Ittihad Tripoli		
2011–2013	Jagodina	31	(0)
2013–2014	Al-Ittihad Tripoli		
2014	Jagodina	0	(0)
2015–2016	Dinamo Minsk	30	(0)
2017	Partizan	5	(0)
2018	Orlando City	26	(0)
2019–2020	Los Angeles FC	29	(2)
2021–2022	Al-Ittihad Tripoli		
2022–	Al-Ahli Tripoli		

International career^{‡}
2012–	Libya	27	(3)
- * Club domestic league appearances and goals as of 6 April 2021 ‡ National team caps and goals as of 7 September 2021

Mohamed El-Monir Abdessalam (Arabic: محمد المنير; born 8 April 1992), also known as Mohamed El Monir, is a Libyan professional footballer who plays for Libyan Premier League club Al-Ahli Tripoli and the Libya national team as a defender or midfielder.

== Club career ==
=== Al-Ittihad Tripoli ===
El Monir came through the youth ranks of Al-Ittihad Tripoli and was promoted to the first team in the 2010–11 Libyan Premier League season. Al-Ittihad with El Monir were top of the league, undefeated after 15 rounds, with 13 victories and just two draws, when the league was abandoned half-way due to the Libyan Civil War.

=== Jagodina ===
==== 2011–12 season ====
El Monir signed with Serbian side Jagodina in summer 2011 coming from Al-Ittihad Tripoli. He made his debut for FK Jagodina on 26 October 2011 as a starter in a last 16-round match of Serbian Cup against FK Javor Ivanjica, a 3–5 penalty loss after a 1–1 draw after extra-time. His league debut happened on 17 March 2012, in a round 19 match against current league leaders and previous season champions, Partizan.

==== 2012–13 season ====
On 21 April 2012, he impressed the local media and specially the club supporters when he showed extreme will of playing and a die-hard attitude when he played 35 minutes of the 23rd round of the SuperLiga match against FK BSK Borča with a fractured foot. It all happened in the 10th minute, however El Monir willing to keep on playing only reported the injury at the half-time and got substituted. As this was only the second time that he got a chance to be a starter in the team he did not wanted to miss the chance to show his skills, and despite the pain, he did his best to contribute to keep on playing. Despite the questionable attitude from the point of view of his health, the national press and Jagodina officials and supporters couldn't resist not to praise this display of enormous dedication.

In early October 2012, prior to his departure to join the national team, El Monir renewed his contract with Jagodina until 2015. On 8 May 2013, he played a key role in Jagodina's 1–0 victory against FK Vojvodina in the 2013 Serbian Cup Final.

==== 2013–14 season ====
At the beginning of the 2013–14 season, El Monir played against Rubin Kazan in the 2013–14 UEFA Europa League qualifying phase and play-off round. On 4 November 2013, it was announced that CA Osasuna sent scouts to watch El Monir play for Jagodina.

=== Return to Al-Ittihad Tripoli ===
During the winter break, he left Jagodina and returned to Libya and played for his former club Al-Ittihad Tripoli.

=== Return to Jagodina ===
On 28 August 2014, he signed again with Jagodina. During the first part of 2014–15 season, he has not played a single game. In December 2014, El Monir went on trial at Genk in Belgium.

=== Dinamo Minsk ===
On 30 April 2015, El Monir signed a contract with Dinamo Minsk. He made his debut for Dinamo in Vysheyshaya Liga on 31 May 2015, playing the full 90 minutes in a 2–1 home win over Naftan. During his first season in Belarus, he has played 11 league games. On 1 October 2015, El Monir made his debut in UEFA Europa League group stage against Rapid Wien as a substitute in the 66th minute. On 5 November, El Monir was the first time in the starting lineup in Europa League, in a 1–2 home defeat against Villarreal. On 10 December, he entered in the game in 65th minute of the match against Rapid Wien and scored a goal one minute later in 2–1 away loss. On 24 April 2016, El Monir played full 90 minutes with providing two assists in a 3–3 away draw against BATE Borisov.

=== Partizan ===
After a year and a half playing in Belarus, when his contract with Dinamo Minsk, El Monir among several options decided to return to Serbia, only that this time, to join the power-house Partizan. He had been on Partizan's agenda on several occasions in the past and the move finally materialised. On 16 January 2017, he signed with Partizan a three-year contract. He made his club debut on 13 April 2017 in a 3–1 away win against Novi Pazar.

=== Orlando City ===
On 27 December 2017, El Monir signed with Orlando City SC in Major League Soccer. He made his debut on March 4 in Orlando's season opener at home to DC United, a 1–1 draw.

=== Los Angeles FC ===
On 11 December 2018, El Monir was traded by Orlando to Los Angeles FC in exchange for João Moutinho.

=== Al-Ittihad Tripoli ===
On 6 April 2021, El Monir returned to Al-Ittihad Tripoli for a third spell.

== International career ==
Mohamed El Monir made the squad for the 2012 Africa Cup of Nations, but was an unused substitute at all the matches at the tournament. Subsequently, he was part of the Libyan squad in the following call by Marcos Paquetá for the 2014 FIFA World Cup qualifiers against Togo and Cameroon, played on 3 and 10 June respectively. He finally made his debut appearance for Libya on 14 October 2012 in his country's 2–0 loss to Algeria.

== Career statistics ==
As of October 28, 2020

Club	Season	League			Cup		Continental		Total	
Club	Season	Division	Apps	Goals	Apps	Goals	Apps	Goals	Apps	Goals
Jagodina	2011–12	Serbian SuperLiga	3	0	1	0	0	0	4	0
Jagodina	2012–13	Serbian SuperLiga	18	0	4	1	0	0	22	1
Jagodina	2013–14	Serbian SuperLiga	10	0	2	0	2	0	14	0
Jagodina	Total		31	0	7	1	2	0	40	1
Dinamo Minsk	2015	Belarusian Premier League	11	0	3	0	10	1	24	1
Dinamo Minsk	2016	Belarusian Premier League	19	0	3	0	5	1	27	1
Dinamo Minsk	Total		30	0	6	0	15	2	51	2
Partizan	2016–17	Serbian SuperLiga	3	0	2	0	0	0	5	0
Partizan	2017–18	Serbian SuperLiga	2	0	0	0	0	0	2	0
Partizan	Total		5	0	2	0	0	0	7	0
Orlando City	2018	MLS	26	0	3	0	0	0	29	0
Los Angeles	2019	MLS	15	1	1	0	0	0	16	1
Los Angeles	2020	MLS	14	1	0	0	2	0	16	1
Los Angeles	Total		29	2	1	0	2	0	32	1
Career Total			121	2	19	1	19	2	159	5

=== International goals ===
As of match played 11 November 2016.

Goal	Date	Venue	Opponent	Score	Result	Competition
1.	17 November 2015	Amahoro Stadium, Kigali, Rwanda	Rwanda	0–1	1–3	2018 FIFA World Cup qualification
2.	17 November 2015	Amahoro Stadium, Kigali, Rwanda	Rwanda	1–3	1–3	2018 FIFA World Cup qualification
3.	28 March 2016	Petro Sport Stadium, Cairo, Egypt	São Tomé and Príncipe	3–0	4–0	2017 Africa Cup of Nations qualification

== Honours ==
Jagodina

- Serbian Cup: 2012–13

Partizan

- Serbian SuperLiga: 2016–17
- Serbian Cup: 2016–17

Los Angeles

- Supporters' Shield: 2019

Al-Ittihad Tripoli

- Libyan Premier League: 2020–21
