= Uroš Damnjanović =

Serbian footballer

Personal information
- Date of birth: 8 February 1995 (age 31)
- Place of birth: Belgrade, FR Yugoslavia
- Height: 1.82 m (6 ft 0 in)
- Position: Midfielder

Team information
- Current team: Metalac Gornji Milanovac
- Number: 19

Youth career
- 2003–2013: Rad

Senior career*
Years	Team	Apps	(Gls)
2013–2014	Rad	10	(0)
2014–2015	Teleoptik	24	(7)
2015–2016	Partizan	1	(0)
2015–2016	→ Sinđelić Beograd (loan)	26	(6)
2017–2018	Slovan Bratislava	12	(0)
2018–2019	Radnički Niš	4	(0)
2019–2020	Radnik Surdulica	21	(2)
2020–2021	Rad	34	(2)
2021	Irodotos		
2022	Bregalnica Štip	15	(4)
2022–2023	Loznica	33	(5)
2023	Kolubara	16	(0)
2024–	Metalac Gornji Milanovac	13	(0)

International career
2011	Serbia U17		
2016	Serbia U21	3	(0)
- * Club domestic league appearances and goals as of 26 December 2023

Uroš Damnjanović (Serbian Cyrillic: Урош Дамњановић; born 8 February 1995) is a Serbian professional footballer who plays as a midfielder for OFK MLADENOVAC.

== Club career ==
Damnjanović left Partizan to move abroad and join Slovak powerhouse Slovan Bratislava. In summer 2018 he joined Radnički Niš.

On 31 August 2021, he signed with Irodotos in Greece, only to leave them for Macedonian outfit Bregalnica Štip in February 2022. He switched Kolubara for Metalac GM in February 2024.
