= Everton Luiz =

Brazilian footballer (born 1988)

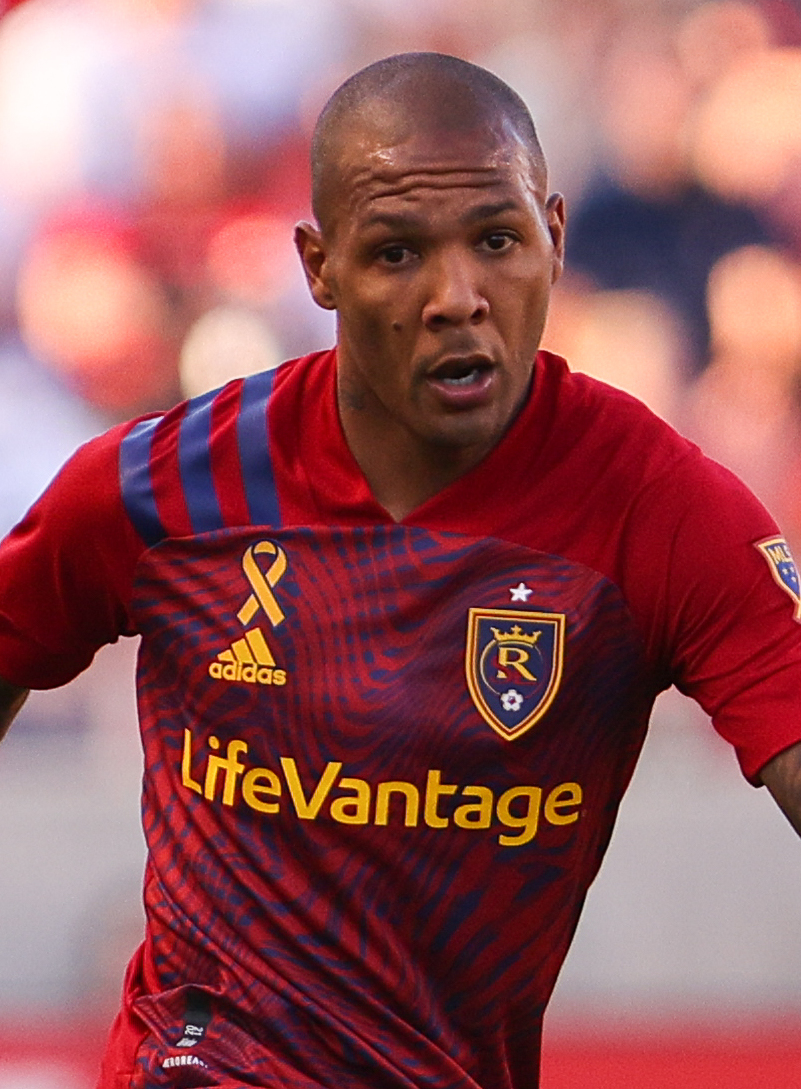
- Everton Luiz with Real Salt Lake in 2021

Personal information
- Full name: Everton Luiz Guimarães Bilher
- Date of birth: 24 May 1988 (age 38)
- Place of birth: Porto Alegre, Brazil
- Height: 1.73 m (5 ft 8 in)
- Position: Defensive midfielder

Team information
- Current team: Laguna

Youth career
- Brasil de Farroupilha
- Caxias do Sul
- Náutico
- 2007–2008: Ponte Preta

Senior career*
Years	Team	Apps	(Gls)
2009	Ponte Preta	2	(0)
2009–2011	Palmeiras	0	(0)
2010	→ Marília (loan)	13	(2)
2011	→ Bragantino (loan)	0	(0)
2012–2013	CRB	37	(1)
2012	→ San Luis (loan)	10	(0)
2013	→ Criciúma (loan)	3	(0)
2013–2014	Lugano	28	(3)
2014–2016	St. Gallen	39	(0)
2016–2018	Partizan	52	(3)
2018–2019	SPAL	21	(0)
2019	→ Real Salt Lake (loan)	27	(0)
2020–2022	Real Salt Lake	52	(0)
2022–2025	Beveren	63	(3)
2026–	Laguna	9	(0)
- * Club domestic league appearances and goals as of 1 May 2026

Everton Luiz Guimarães Bilher (born 24 May 1988), commonly known as Everton Luiz, is a Brazilian professional footballer who plays as a defensive midfielder for Laguna. He is primarily recognized for his aggressive and hard-tackling style of play.

After starting out in his homeland, mainly playing in the lower leagues, Everton Luiz moved to Europe in 2013. He went on to play for Swiss clubs Lugano and St. Gallen, before transferring to Serbian club Partizan in early 2016. In his first full season with the Crno-beli, Everton Luiz collected the double.

In early 2018, Everton Luiz moved to Italy to join Serie A club SPAL. He was sent out on loan to Major League Soccer team Real Salt Lake a year later, before signing a permanent deal with them ahead of the 2020 season.

== Career ==
=== Early years ===
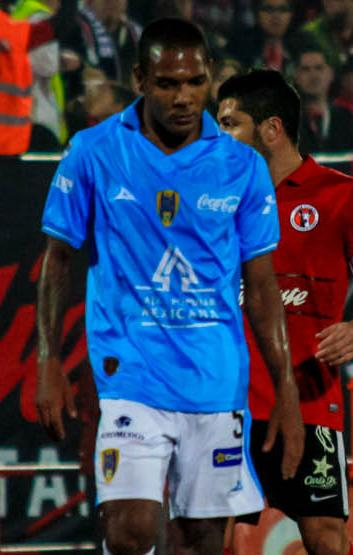
Everton Luiz with San Luis in 2012

Born in Porto Alegre, Everton Luiz started out at his home state club Brasil de Farroupilha. He subsequently went to Caxias do Sul, before switching to Náutico. In 2007, Everton Luiz signed with Ponte Preta, eventually finishing his formation in the club's youth setup. He made his senior debut for the club in the Campeonato Paulista, before signing with Palmeiras in April 2009, on a four-year deal. In February 2010, Everton Luiz was loaned to Marília, representing the club in the second level of the São Paulo state league. He also played for Marília in the Campeonato Brasileiro Série C, making seven appearances and scoring once.

In 2011, after playing for Palmeiras' B team, Everton Luiz had a brief spell with Bragantino, but failed to make any appearances. He eventually signed with CRB in early 2012. Immediately upon arrival, Everton Luiz became one of the club's key players, helping CRB win the Campeonato Alagoano. He was also named in the competition's team of the year. In June 2012, Everton Luiz joined Mexican club San Luis. He made 10 appearances in the Torneo Apertura, before leaving the club. In January 2013, Everton Luiz was loaned to Criciúma. He subsequently returned to CRB in March 2013. After returning from loan, Everton Luiz helped his team win another Alagoas state league title, being named in the competition's best eleven for the second year in a row.

=== Lugano and St. Gallen ===
In the summer of 2013, Everton Luiz moved to Swiss club Lugano. He made his official debut for the club in a 2–1 home league win over Wil on 13 July 2013. In the following fixture, Everton Luiz scored his first goal for Lugano, netting the opener in his team's 4–2 away victory over Schaffhausen. He scored a total of three goals from 28 appearances in the Swiss Challenge League, as the club finished in second place.

In June 2014, Everton Luiz switched to St. Gallen, penning a three-year deal. After initially playing for their reserve team in the Swiss Promotion League, Everton Luiz made his Swiss Super League debut on 24 September 2014, playing the full 90 minutes in a 3–0 victory over Grasshoppers, eventually becoming a regular member of the first team. He collected 24 league appearances in the 2014–15 season, receiving two red cards in the process.

=== Partizan ===
==== 2015–16 season ====
On 6 January 2016, Everton Luiz was transferred to Serbian club Partizan. He signed a two-and-a-half-year contract and was given the number 25 shirt. On 27 February, Everton Luiz made his official debut for the club in a 2–1 home loss in the Belgrade derby, receiving a yellow card early into the match. He sustained a knee injury in his second appearance for Partizan, a 1–0 away victory at Radnički Niš, which eventually kept him out of action for more than a month. On 10 April, Everton Luiz returned to the pitch in a 4–0 home league win over Mladost Lučani, playing the whole game. He netted his first goal for the club in his second Belgrade derby on 16 April, scoring an injury-time equalizer from more than 30 meters out through the goalkeeper's hands. After celebrating his goal, Everton Luiz was sent off for provoking the opponent's fans. He subsequently helped Partizan win the 2015–16 Serbian Cup, playing the full 90 minutes and earning a yellow card in the final match, a 2–0 win over Javor Ivanjica.

==== 2016–17 season ====
In July 2016, Everton Luiz recorded his debuts in UEFA competitions, playing the full 90 minutes in two goalless draws against Zagłębie Lubin in the 2016–17 UEFA Europa League second qualifying round, as Partizan were eliminated after a penalty shoot-out. He scored his first goal of the season in a 3–0 away league victory over Voždovac on 15 October. In his first full campaign with Partizan, Everton Luiz helped the club win the double. He was also named in the league's best eleven due to his solid performances in the process.

==== 2017–18 season ====
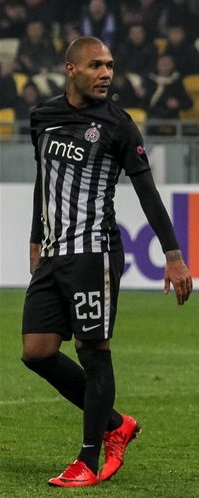
Everton Luiz with Partizan in 2017

In late May 2017, following a successful season for Partizan, the club's sporting director Ivica Iliev confirmed that Everton Luiz would be offered a new deal. However, no agreement was reached and the player entered the final year of his contract.

On 20 September 2017, Everton Luiz scored an injury-time goal to give Partizan a 1–1 draw versus Napredak Kruševac. He also appeared in all six of his team's games in the Europa League, as the side reached the knockout stage after 13 years.

=== SPAL ===
On 19 January 2018, Everton Luiz officially joined Italian club SPAL, penning a deal until the summer of 2020 with an option for another year. He made his Serie A debut on 10 February 2018, playing the first 55 minutes in an eventual 4–0 home loss to Milan. By the end of the season, Everton Luiz appeared in 10 more league games, helping the side avoid relegation.

=== Real Salt Lake ===
In January 2019, Everton Luiz was loaned to Major League Soccer club Real Salt Lake until the end of the year with an option to buy.

In December 2019, Real Salt Lake exercised their option to buy Everton Luiz ahead of the 2020 season.

=== Return to Europe ===
In July 2022, Everton Luiz was transferred to Belgian club Beveren.

=== Return to Brazil ===
After playing abroad for over a decade, Everton Luiz returned to his homeland and signed with Laguna for the 2026 season.

== Career statistics ==
As of 18 January 2026

Appearances and goals by club, season and competition
Club	Season	League			State League		Cup		State Cup		Continental		Other		Total	
Club	Season	Division	Apps	Goals	Apps	Goals	Apps	Goals	Apps	Goals	Apps	Goals	Apps	Goals	Apps	Goals
Ponte Preta	2009	Brasileirão Série B	0	0	2	0	0	0	0	0	—		—		2	0
Palmeiras	2009	Brasileirão Série A	0	0	0	0	0	0	7	0	0	0	—		7	0
Palmeiras	2010	Brasileirão Série A	0	0	0	0	0	0	0	0	0	0	—		0	0
Palmeiras	2011	Brasileirão Série A	0	0	0	0	0	0	6	0	0	0	—		6	0
Palmeiras	Total		0	0	0	0	0	0	13	0	0	0	—		13	0
Marília (loan)	2010	Brasileirão Série C	7	1	6	1	0	0	2	1	—		—		15	3
Bragantino (loan)	2011	Brasileirão Série B	0	0	0	0	0	0	0	0	—		—		0	0
CRB	2012	Brasileirão Série B	6	0	19	0	0	0	0	0	—		—		25	0
CRB	2013	Brasileirão Série C	1	0	11	1	3	0	0	0	—		—		15	1
CRB	Total		7	0	30	1	3	0	0	0	—		—		40	1
San Luis (loan)	2012–13	Liga MX	10	0	—		3	0	—		—		—		13	0
Criciúma (loan)	2013	Brasileirão Série A	0	0	3	0	0	0	0	0	—		—		3	0
Lugano	2013–14	Swiss Challenge League	28	3	—		1	0	—		—		—		29	3
St. Gallen	2014–15	Swiss Super League	24	0	—		5	0	—		—		—		29	0
St. Gallen	2015–16	Swiss Super League	15	0	—		2	0	—		—		—		17	0
St. Gallen	Total		39	0	—		7	0	—		—		—		46	0
Partizan	2015–16	Serbian SuperLiga	9	1	—		2	0	—		0	0	—		11	1
Partizan	2016–17	Serbian SuperLiga	29	1	—		3	0	—		2	0	—		34	1
Partizan	2017–18	Serbian SuperLiga	14	1	—		2	0	—		11	0	—		27	1
Partizan	Total		52	3	—		7	0	—		13	0	—		72	3
SPAL	2017–18	Serie A	11	0	—		0	0	—		—		—		11	0
SPAL	2018–19	Serie A	10	0	—		2	0	—		—		—		12	0
SPAL	Total		21	0	—		2	0	—		—		—		23	0
Real Salt Lake (loan)	2019	MLS	27	0	—		1	0	—		1	0	2 (Note: Appearances in MLS Cup Playoffs)	0	31	0
Real Salt Lake	2020	MLS	15	0	—		0	0	—		0	0	0	0	15	0
Real Salt Lake	2021	MLS	25	0	—		0	0	—		0	0	2	0	27	0
Real Salt Lake	2022	MLS	12	0	—		1	0	—		0	0	0	0	13	0
Real Salt Lake	Total		52	0	—		1	0	—		0	0	2	0	55	0
Beveren	2022–23	Challenger Pro League	28	2	—		2	0	—		—		—		30	2
Beveren	2023–24	Challenger Pro League	26	1	—		2	0	—		—		—		28	1
Beveren	2024–25	Challenger Pro League	9	0	—		2	0	—		—		—		11	0
Beveren	Total		63	3	—		6	0	—		—		—		69	3
Career total			306	10	41	2	31	0	15	1	14	0	4	0	411	13

== Honours ==
CRB

- Campeonato Alagoano: 2012, 2013

Partizan

- Serbian SuperLiga: 2016–17
- Serbian Cup: 2015–16, 2016–17

Individual

- Campeonato Alagoano Team of the Year: 2012, 2013
- Serbian SuperLiga Team of the Season: 2016–17
