= Leonardo (footballer, born 1992) =

Brazilian footballer

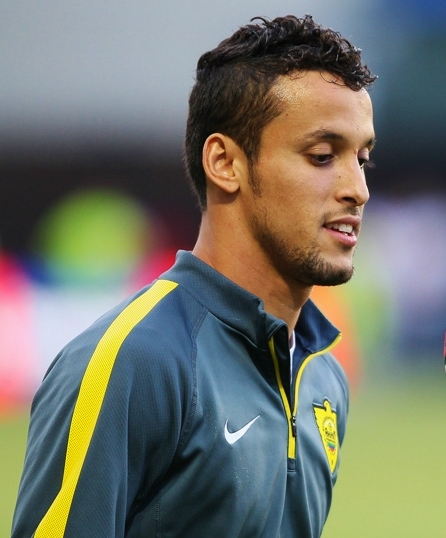
- Leonardo with Anzhi Makhachkala in 2015

Personal information
- Full name: Leonardo da Silva Souza
- Date of birth: 18 March 1992 (age 34)
- Place of birth: Andirá, Brazil
- Height: 1.74 m (5 ft 9 in)
- Positions: Attacking midfielder; forward

Youth career
- Matsubara
- 2011–2012: Beerschot

Senior career*
Years	Team	Apps	(Gls)
2012–2013	Enosis Neon Paralimni	11	(5)
2013	Metalurh Donetsk	9	(1)
2013–2014	Gabala	31	(7)
2014–2016	Anzhi Makhachkala	31	(8)
2016–2017	Partizan	34	(24)
2017–2018	Al-Ahli	19	(10)
2018–2019	Al Wahda	21	(13)
2019–2020	Shabab Al-Ahli	11	(7)
2022	Maringá	7	(1)
2023	Cianorte	1	(0)
2023	Balzan	9	(4)
- * Club domestic league appearances and goals

Leonardo da Silva Souza (born 18 March 1992), known simply as Leonardo, is a Brazilian former professional footballer. He operated as an attacking midfielder who could play on both flanks.

Leonardo arrived to Europe at an early age, making his senior debuts with Cypriot club Enosis Neon Paralimni in 2012. He subsequently moved to Ukrainian club Metalurh Donetsk in early 2013. After six months there, Leonardo switched to Azerbaijani club Gabala. He changed clubs and countries again in August 2014, joining Russian club Anzhi Makhachkala. In the summer of 2016, Leonardo signed with Serbian club Partizan, helping them win the double in the 2016–17 season.

== Career ==
=== Early years ===
A native of Paraná, Leonardo started out at local club Matsubara. He later moved to Belgium and joined the youth team of Beerschot. In April 2012, it was announced that Leonardo signed a three-year contract with Ukrainian club Tavriya Simferopol with an effective date of 1 July 2012. He eventually joined Cypriot side Enosis Neon Paralimni only a few months later. After promising performances in Cyprus, Leonardo made a return to Ukraine and signed with Metalurh Donetsk on a three-year deal in January 2013. However, due to player's third-party ownership with his agent Dmitry Selyuk, the Cypriot club did not receive any transfer fee.

=== Gabala ===
On 13 July 2013, Leonardo joined Azerbaijani club Gabala on a one-year deal. He scored seven league goals from 31 appearances in the 2013–14 season. They also finished as runners-up in the Azerbaijan Cup, losing on penalties to Neftçi after a 1–1 draw.

=== Anzhi Makhachkala ===
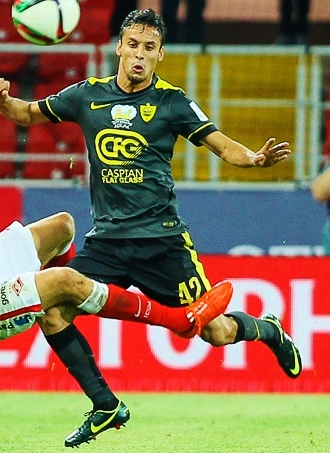
Leonardo playing for Anzhi Makhachkala in 2015

On 10 August 2014, Leonardo signed a two-year contract with Russian club Anzhi Makhachkala. He scored his first competitive goal for the club on his 23rd birthday, finding the back of the net in the 84th minute of a 5–1 home league victory over Yenisey Krasnoyarsk. On 10 May 2015, Leonardo scored twice in a 3–1 home win over Tyumen. He scored a total of seven league goals in his debut season in the country, helping the club win promotion back to the Premier League at the first time. On 22 August 2015, Leonardo scored his first RFPL goal in a 1–1 draw with Ural Yekaterinburg, converting a second-half penalty. However, the club eventually terminated his contract on 25 February 2016, due to the player's disciplinary record.

=== Partizan ===
In June 2016, it was announced that Leonardo agreed to join Serbian club Partizan on a three-year deal. He was officially presented two weeks later and assigned the number 42 shirt. On 24 July 2016, Leonardo made his competitive debut for Partizan, coming off the bench as a second-half substitute for Miroslav Radović in the goalless draw against Bačka. He netted his first goal for the club on 20 August 2016, shortly after substituting Saša Ilić in an eventual 1–2 away loss to Spartak Subotica. Seven days later, Leonardo scored from a direct free kick in a 4–0 home league win over Rad.

On 17 September 2016, Leonardo scored the winning goal in the 89th minute of the Belgrade derby, giving his team a 1–0 win at home. He subsequently found the back of the net in the next four games, including a remarkable goal in a 1–0 away win over Metalac Gornji Milanovac. By the end of the year, Leonardo scored six more league goals, including two braces in two home wins over Napredak Kruševac (3–2) in November, and Spartak Subotica (2–0) in December.

On 18 April 2017, Leonardo scored a brace in the Belgrade derby, an eventual 3–1 away success. He ultimately collected the domestic double in his debut season at Partizan. Due to his consistent performances in the process, Leonardo was named in the league's best eleven.

On 11 July 2017, Leonardo netted his first goal in UEFA competitions, giving Partizan a 2–0 home win over Budućnost Podgorica in the first leg of the Champions League second qualifying round.

On 3 August 2017, Leonardo was transferred to Saudi club Al-Ahli for a fee of €4 million. He signed a two-year deal with an option for two more seasons.

=== Al Wahda ===
In August 2018, Leonardo signed a two-year contract with Emirati club Al Wahda on a free transfer. He scored four goals to give his team a 4–3 home victory over Al-Rayyan in the fourth round of matches in Group B of the AFC Champions League.

=== Shabab Al-Ahli ===
On 31 August 2019, Shabab Al-Ahli has signed Leonardo on free transfer.

== Personal life ==
Leonardo's older brother, Alan, is also a footballer.

In January 2016, during a vacation in his homeland, Leonardo was involved in a fatal road traffic accident whilst intoxicated.

== Career statistics ==
As of 2 December 2023

Appearances and goals by club, season and competition
Club	Season	League			State League		National cup		League cup		Continental		Other		Total	
Club	Season	Division	Apps	Goals	Apps	Goals	Apps	Goals	Apps	Goals	Apps	Goals	Apps	Goals	Apps	Goals
Enosis Neon Paralimni	2012–13	Cypriot First Division	11	5	—		1	0	—		—		—		12	5
Metalurh Donetsk	2012–13	Ukrainian Premier League	9	1	—		0	0	—		—		—		9	1
Gabala	2013–14	Azerbaijan Premier League	31	7	—		2	1	—		—		—		33	8
Anzhi Makhachkala	2014–15	Russian Premier League	21	7	—		1	0	—		—		—		22	7
Anzhi Makhachkala	2015–16	Russian Premier League	10	1	—		1	1	—		—		—		11	2
Anzhi Makhachkala	Total		31	8	—		2	1	—		—		—		33	9
Partizan	2016–17	Serbian SuperLiga	34	24	—		4	2	—		0	0	—		38	26
Partizan	2017–18	Serbian SuperLiga	—		—		—		—		3 (Note: Appearance(s) in UEFA Champions League)	1	—		3	1
Partizan	Total		34	24	—		4	2	—		3	1	—		41	27
Al-Ahli	2017–18	Saudi Pro League	19	10	—		2	0	—		2 (Note: Appearance(s) in AFC Champions League)	1	—		23	11
Al Wahda	2018–19	UAE Pro League	21	13	—		1	0	7	6	5	8	1 (Note: Appearance(s) in UAE Super Cup)	0	35	27
Shabab Al-Ahli	2019–20	UAE Pro League	11	7	—		1	0	5	1	0	0	—		17	8
Maringá	2022	—			7	1	—		—		—		—		7	1
Cianorte	2023	—			1	0	—		—		—		—		1	0
Balzan	2023–24	Maltese Premier League	9	4	—		0	0	—		—		—		0	0
Career total			176	79	8	1	13	4	12	7	10	10	1	0	220	103

== Honours ==
Gabala

- Azerbaijan Cup runner-up: 2013–14

Partizan

- Serbian SuperLiga: 2016–17
- Serbian Cup: 2016–17

Al Wahda

- UAE Super Cup: 2018

Individual

- Serbian SuperLiga top scorer: 2016–17
- Serbian SuperLiga Team of the Season: 2016–17
- 2019 AFC Champions League OPTA Best XI
- 2019 AFC Champions League Fans' Best XI
