= Lazar Ćirković =

Serbian footballer

Lazar Ćirković Лазар Ћирковић
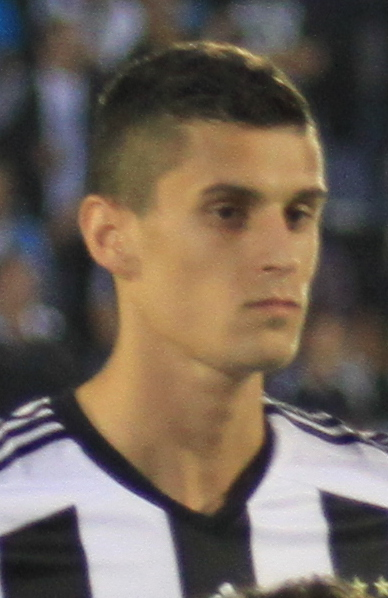
- Ćirković in 2014

Personal information
- Date of birth: 22 August 1992 (age 34)
- Place of birth: Niš, FR Yugoslavia
- Height: 1.92 m (6 ft 3 1/2 in)
- Position: Centre-back

Team information
- Current team: Mumbai City
- Number: 4

Youth career
- Filip Filipović Niš
- –2008: Partizan
- 2008–2010: Rad

Senior career*
Years	Team	Apps	(Gls)
2010–2014	Rad	48	(1)
2012	→ Palić (loan)	7	(1)
2014–2018	Partizan	30	(0)
2018–2020	Luzern	32	(1)
2020	Maccabi Netanya	4	(0)
2021–2022	Kisvárda	43	(2)
2022–2023	Honvéd	17	(0)
2023–2024	Chennaiyin	19	(1)
2024–2026	Jamshedpur	32	(1)
2026–	Mumbai City	1	(0)

International career
2013–2015	Serbia U21	9	(0)
- * Club domestic league appearances and goals as of 13:30, 12 October 2026 (UTC)

Lazar Ćirković (Serbian Cyrillic: Лазар Ћирковић; born 1992) is a Serbian professional footballer who plays as a defender for Indian Super League club Mumbai City.

== Club career ==
Ćirković started his professional career with Serbian SuperLiga club Rad in the 2010–11 season. He was also loaned to Serbian League Vojvodina club Palić in the 2011–12 season. On 20 August 2014, Ćirković signed a four-year contract with Partizan. He made his official debut for the club in a UEFA Europa League game against Tottenham Hotspur on 18 September 2014.

== International career ==
Ćirković made his competitive debut for the Serbia national under-21 team in a 3–1 home win over Northern Ireland on 15 October 2013, playing for the team intermittently till 2015. He was a member of the team at the 2015 UEFA Under-21 Championship.

== Honours ==
Partizan

- Serbian SuperLiga: 2014–15, 2016–17
- Serbian Cup: 2016–17
