= Nemanja Miletić (footballer, born July 1991) =

Serbian footballer

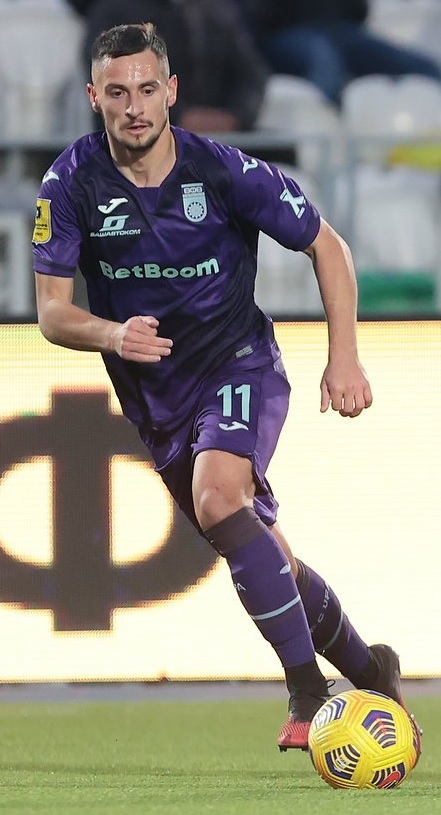
- Miletić with FC Ufa in 2021

Personal information
- Date of birth: 26 July 1991 (age 35)
- Place of birth: Loznica, SFR Yugoslavia
- Height: 1.90 m (6 ft 3 in)
- Position: Left-back

Team information
- Current team: Radnički 1923
- Number: 3

Youth career
- Red Star Belgrade

Senior career*
Years	Team	Apps	(Gls)
2008–2009	Red Star Belgrade	0	(0)
2009	→ Sopot (loan)	3	(0)
2010	Radnički Klupci	24	(1)
2011	Sopot	2	(0)
2011–2012	Radnički Klupci	13	(3)
2012–2013	Mačva Šabac	20	(1)
2013–2016	Javor Ivanjica	79	(0)
2016–2019	Partizan	70	(3)
2019–2020	Korona Kielce	2	(0)
2019	Korona Kielce II	3	(0)
2020–2021	Olympiakos Nicosia	12	(0)
2021–2022	Ufa	17	(1)
2023–2024	Javor Ivanjica	46	(0)
2024–2026	Novi Pazar	67	(3)
2026–	Radnički 1923	0	(0)

International career
2016–2017	Serbia	2	(0)
- * Club domestic league appearances and goals as of 9 June 2026

Nemanja Miletić (Serbian Cyrillic: Немања Милетић; born 26 July 1991) is a Serbian professional footballer who plays as a left-back for Radnički 1923.

== Club career ==
=== Early years ===
Born in Loznica, Miletić spent some period in Red Star Belgrade youth categories, being also licensed with the first team for the 2008–09 season. He made his first senior appearances with Serbian League Belgrade side Sopot in 2009. Miletić played with Radnički Klupci during three seasons in the League West. He also spent one season with Mačva Šabac.

=== Javor Ivanjica ===
In the summer of 2013, Miletić moved to Javor Ivanjica. He made his official debut for the club in a 4–2 home league win over Red Star Belgrade on 11 August 2013. In his first season at the club, Miletić made 26 appearances in all competitions. After the club got relegated, Miletić played regularly in the Serbian First League next season, helping the team to return in the top tier of Serbian football. As one of the team's most regular players, Miletić was runner-up in the 2015–16 Serbian Cup, playing in the final match against Partizan. During his time at Javor, Miletić was usually used as a left-back, or left centre-back.

=== Partizan ===
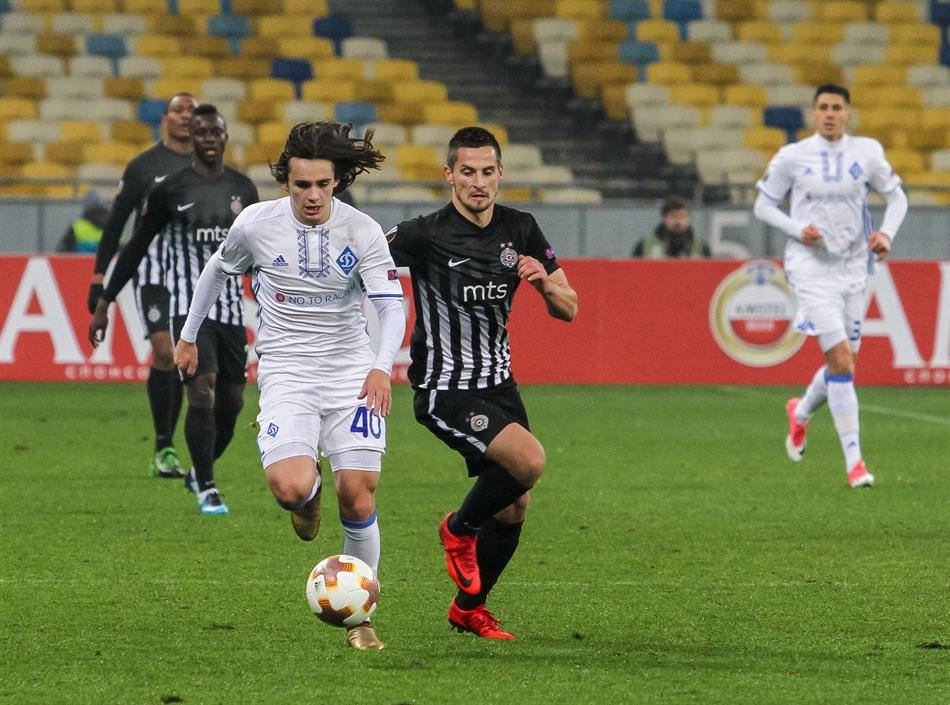
Miletić in action for Partizan in 2017 against Dynamo Kiev

On 7 June 2016, Miletić signed a four-year deal with Partizan for a transfer fee of €260,000. He chose the number 26 jersey. He made his league debut for Partizan on 10 August 2016, playing the full 90 minutes in a 0–2 away win over his former club Javor Ivanjica. On 11 September 2016, Miletić scored his first goal for Partizan in 0–2 away win against Borac Čačak. On 9 September 2017, Miletić scored in a 3–0 victory over Mladost Lučani. Miletić also scored in a 2–0 victory over Radnik Surdulica.

=== Ufa ===
On 26 February 2021, he signed a long-term contract with Russian Premier League club Ufa. Miletić left Ufa on 30 May 2022 following its relegation from the Russian Premier League.

=== Return to Javor ===
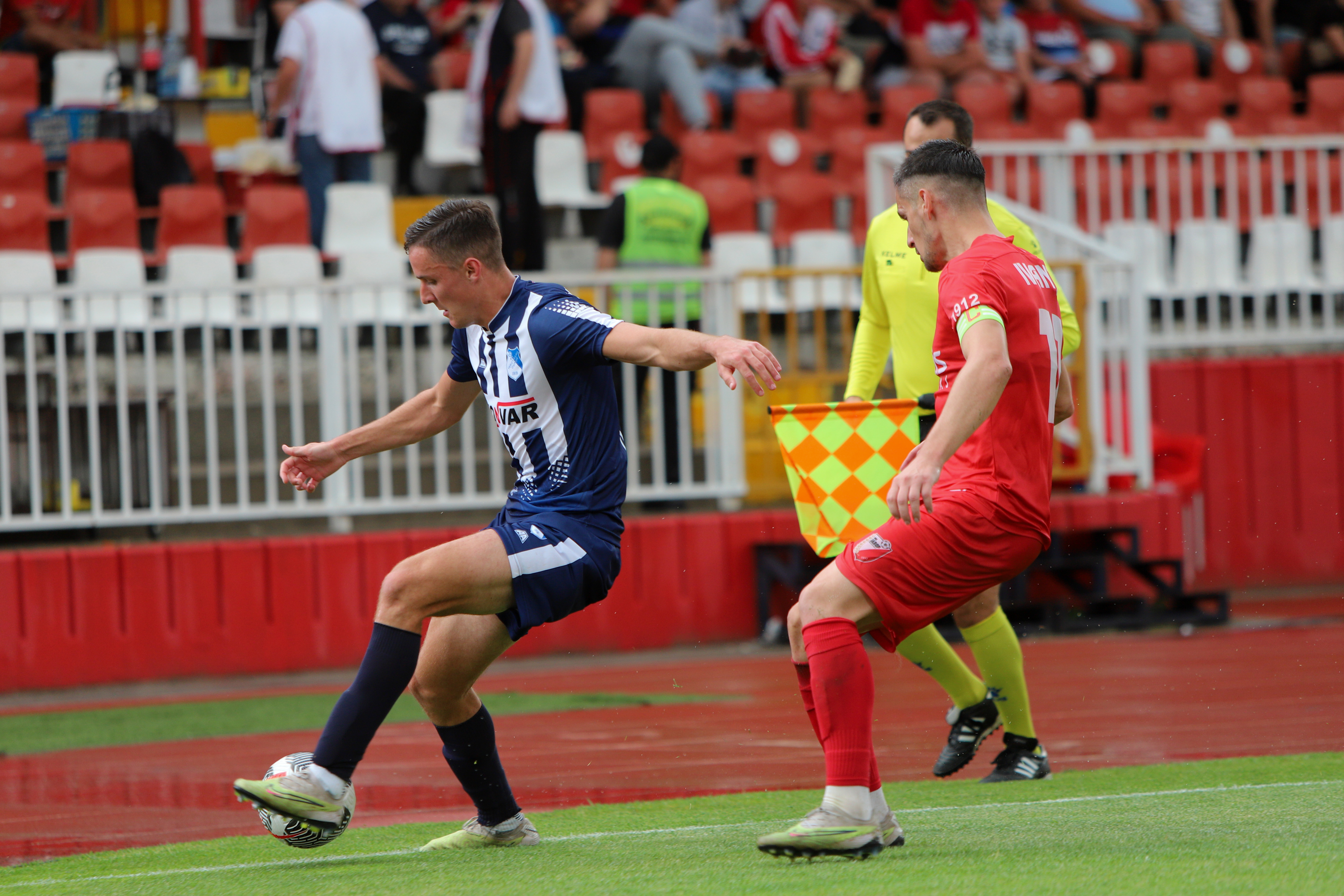
Miletić (in red) in action for Javor in 2024

On 20 December 2022, Miletić returned to Javor Ivanjica on a one-year deal.

== International career ==
Miletić was called up to the Serbia national football team by coach Slavoljub Muslin in September 2016, making his international debut in a friendly 3–0 loss to Qatar. He also received a call-up for a friendly match against the United States, playing the full 90 minutes in a 0–0 away draw in San Diego on 29 January 2017.

== Career statistics ==
=== Club ===
As of 26 May 2026

Appearances and goals by club, season and competition
Club	Season	League			Cup		Continental		Other		Total	
Club	Season	Division	Apps	Goals	Apps	Goals	Apps	Goals	Apps	Goals	Apps	Goals
Red Star Belgrade	2008–09	Serbian SuperLiga	0	0	0	0	0	0	—		0	0
Red Star Belgrade	2009–10	Serbian SuperLiga	0	0	0	0	0	0	—		0	0
Red Star Belgrade	Total		0	0	0	0	0	0	—		0	0
Sopot (loan)	2009–10	Serbian League Belgrade	3	0	—		—		—		3	0
Radnički Klupci	2009–10	Serbian League West	10	0	—		—		—		10	0
Radnički Klupci	2010–11	Serbian League West	14	1	—		—		—		14	1
Radnički Klupci	Total		24	1	—		—		—		24	1
Sopot	2010–11	Serbian League Belgrade	2	0	—		—		—		2	0
Radnički Klupci	2011–12	Serbian League West	13	3	—		—		—		13	3
Mačva Šabac	2012–13	Serbian League West	20	1	—		—		—		20	1
Javor Ivanjica	2013–14	Serbian SuperLiga	25	0	1	0	—		—		26	0
Javor Ivanjica	2014–15	Serbian First League	20	0	1	0	—		—		21	0
Javor Ivanjica	2015–16	Serbian SuperLiga	34	0	6	0	—		—		40	0
Javor Ivanjica	Total		79	0	8	0	—		—		87	0
Partizan	2016–17	Serbian SuperLiga	32	1	4	0	0	0	—		36	1
Partizan	2017–18	Serbian SuperLiga	22	2	3	0	12	0	—		37	2
Partizan	2018–19	Serbian SuperLiga	16	0	2	0	6	0	—		24	0
Partizan	Total		70	3	9	0	20	0	—		99	3
Korona Kielce	2019–20	Ekstraklasa	2	0	0	0	—		—		2	0
Korona Kielce II	2019–20	III liga, gr. IV	3	0	—		—		—		3	0
Olympiakos Nicosia	2020–21	Cypriot First Division	12	0	1	0	—		—		13	0
Ufa	2020–21	Russian Premier League	9	1	1	0	—		—		10	1
Ufa	2021–22	Russian Premier League	8	0	1	0	—		—		9	0
Ufa	Total		17	1	2	0	—		—		19	1
Javor Ivanjica	2022–23	Serbian SuperLiga	15	1	1	0	—		—		16	1
Javor Ivanjica	2023–24	Serbian SuperLiga	31	0	0	0	—		2 (Note: Appearances in Serbian SuperLiga relegation play-offs)	0	33	0
Javor Ivanjica	Total		46	1	1	0	—		2	0	49	1
Novi Pazar	2024–25	Serbian SuperLiga	34	3	1	0	—		—		35	3
Novi Pazar	2025–26	Serbian SuperLiga	33	0	3	0	2	0	—		38	0
Novi Pazar	Total		67	3	4	0	2	0	—		73	3
Career total			358	13	25	0	22	0	2	0	407	13

=== International ===
As of 2 August 2018

Serbia
Year	Apps	Goals
2016	1	0
2017	1	0
Total	2	0

== Honours ==
Partizan

- Serbian SuperLiga: 2016–17
- Serbian Cup: 2016–17, 2017–18, 2018–19
