= Nikola Milenković =

Serbian footballer (born 1997)

Nikola Milenković Никола Миленковић
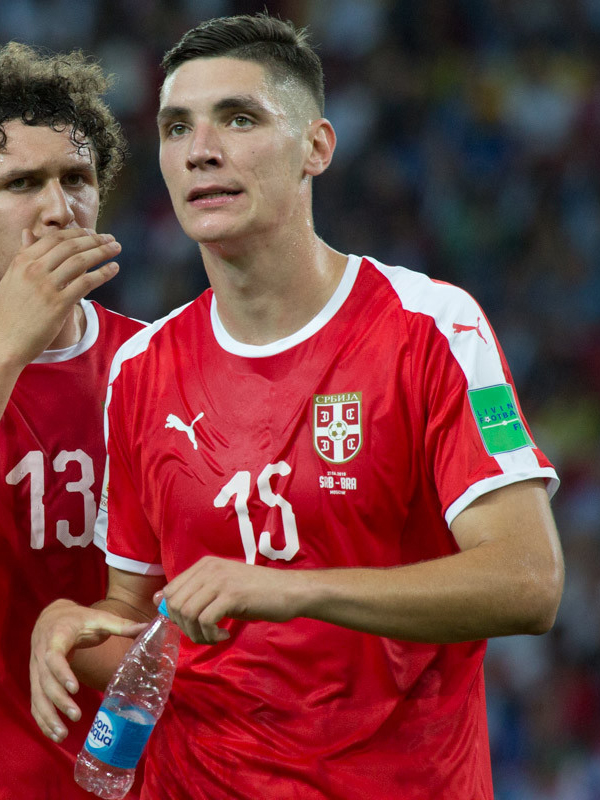
- Milenković with Serbia at the 2018 FIFA World Cup

Personal information
- Full name: Nikola Milenković
- Date of birth: 12 October 1997 (age 29)
- Place of birth: Belgrade, Serbia, FR Yugoslavia
- Height: 1.95 m (6 ft 5 in)
- Position: Centre-back

Team information
- Current team: Nottingham Forest
- Number: 31

Youth career
- 2012–2015: Žarkovo
- 2015: Partizan

Senior career*
Years	Team	Apps	(Gls)
2015–2017	Partizan	36	(2)
2015–2016	→ Teleoptik (loan)	13	(0)
2017–2024	Fiorentina	216	(14)
2024–	Nottingham Forest	82	(5)

International career^{‡}
2017–2019	Serbia U21	9	(0)
2018–	Serbia	73	(3)
- * Club domestic league appearances and goals as of 23:11, 21 November 2026 (UTC) ‡ National team caps and goals as of 16 November 2026

Nikola Milenković (Serbian Cyrillic: Никола Миленковић, pronounced [nǐkola milěːŋkoʋitɕ]; born 12 October 1997) is a Serbian professional footballer who plays as a centre-back for Premier League club Nottingham Forest and the Serbia national team.

== Club career ==
=== Early career ===
Milenković grew up in Bele Vode, a neighbourhood of Belgrade where his family lived. After a successful trial, he was enrolled in the academy roster of Žarkovo. Milenković had an excellent start to his youth career, as he surpassed his teammates in both training and games. Žarkovo's youth coach Nikola Jelić observed his attributes and recommended him to Teleoptik – a farm club of Partizan – where then-15-year-old Milenković would go on to sign for after a successful trial. Later, Milenković was among thirty other youth players who were approved to come for trials with Partizan. Only five passed, and he was one of them.

=== Partizan ===
==== 2015–16 season ====
Passing the youth categories of Partizan, Milenković moved to Teleoptik on loan in the 2015–16 season. At the beginning of 2016, he joined the first team of Partizan under coach Ivan Tomić and signed a five-year contract, but also stayed with Teleoptik on dual registration until the end of season. Several days after debuting for U19 national team, Milenković made his debut for Partizan in a SuperLiga match against Mladost Lučani played on 10 April 2016. He started in a match against Čukarički in round 32 of the same season and received a red card for a brutal foul on Petar Bojić, which resulted in a suspension for the next four matches. Milenković scored his first senior goal for Partizan in the last fixture of the 2015–16 Serbian SuperLiga, against Vojvodina, which was the hundredth goal of the club for the season.

==== 2016–17 season ====
Milenković started new season pairing with Cédric Gogoua for the second qualifying round of the 2016–17 UEFA Europa League against Zagłębie Lubin. He also started SuperLiga competition in the first fixture match against Bačka before spending the following two rounds on the bench. Upon several poor performances and some injuries of the defenders, Milenković started playing continuously from the fourth fixture against Javor Ivanjica onwards. He scored his first season goal in a match against Rad, played on 27 August 2016. Milenković also made his Serbian Cup debut in the first round match, against Napredak Kruševac on 21 September 2016. After Miroslav Vulićević's injury in a cup match against Žarkovo on 25 October 2016, Milenković wore the captain's armbrand. In February 2017, he was listed as one of the 30 best youth footballers in the world by the Italian newspaper La Gazzetta dello Sport. On 18 March 2017, Milenković scored his third goal for Partizan as a senior in 27 fixture match of the season against Voždovac.

On 27 May, in his last match for Partizan, Milenković scored a header against Partizan's biggest rival Red Star which won the game and clinched Partizan's double of the season, winning both the league and cup competitions.

=== Fiorentina ===
==== 2017–2019 ====
On 24 May 2017, president of Partizan Milorad Vučelić confirmed that Milenković would join Serie A club Fiorentina in the summer. The transfer fee was reported as €5.1 million. Milenković made his debut for Fiorentina in 1–0 away league victory against Cagliari on 22 December 2017, having played 84 minutes of the match. Whilst adapting to the Italian environment during the first week of arrival, coach Stefano Pioli did not often include him in the starting line-up. However, the death of the team captain Davide Astori made Pioli change his mind and include Milenković in the starting line-up frequently.

On the second matchday of the 2018–19 Serie A, Milenković scored his first goal at the Stadio Artemio Franchi in a 6–1 victory against Chievo. On 20 April 2019, he scored sixth minute opener in a 2–1 away defeat against Juventus.

In the first round of the 2019–20 season against Napoli, Milenković scored the second goal for his team as a 7-goal thriller ends in Napoli's favour. After a corner taken by Erick Pulgar Milenkovic's header Proves Decisive in a 1–0 victory against Udinese. On 30 October, he scored his third goal of the season and thus helped Fiorentina come from behind to claim a 2–1 victory against Sassuolo. After another corner combination between Pulgar and Milenković, the latter scored the equalising goal in his club's 2–1 defeat against Roma at the Stadio Olimpico. At the end of the 2021–22 Serie A season, Fiorentina finished in seventh position and secured their first ever participation in the UEFA Europa Conference League.

==== 2022–2024: Conference League and final season ====
After five seasons of absence, Fiorentina returned to European competition. Upon the goalless draw on 2 August 2022, their opponent was Dutch club Twente, who they beat 2-1 on aggregate to qualify for the main competition. By doing so, Fiorentina became the first club to record two consecutive final appearances in the competition's history, but in losing both against West Ham United and Olympiacos – becoming the first team to lose two consecutive European finals since Benfica in 2013 and 2014 UEFA Europa League finals.

=== Nottingham Forest ===
On 18 July 2024, Milenković signed for Premier League club Nottingham Forest on a five-year contract for an undisclosed transfer fee, believed to be around £12 million. Milenković debuted on 24 August 2024, as Nottingham Forest claimed their first victory of the 2024–25 season by beating Southampton 1–0 at St Mary's Stadium.

Following Nottingham Forest's surprisingly strong start, which saw the club entering Champions league spot through the first half of the 2024–25 Premier League season, Milenkovic's performance at the heart of defence was widely hailed as a key to the team's early success under manager Nuno Espírito Santo. He scored his first goal for the club in a 3–2 away victory against Manchester United on 7 December 2024. Having continued to impress as Nottingham Forest qualified for the European competitions, Milenković was voted as the club's Player of the Season for the 2024–25 season, scoring five goals in 37 appearances.

== International career ==
=== Youth ===
Milenković was a member of the Serbia under-19 team in early 2016. Later that year, he was called up to the Serbia U20 national squad by coach Nenad Lalatović, and made his debut for the team in a match against Montenegro. In March 2017, Milenković was called up to the U21 squad by Lalatović, debuted on 28 March in a 1–2 friendly loss against Slovakia.

=== Senior ===
On 4 June 2018, Milenković made his debut for the senior national team in a friendly match against Bolivia. Later that month, coach Mladen Krstajić included Milenković in the final 23-man squad for the 2018 World Cup. He played in all three group stage matches.

In November 2022, Milenković was selected in Serbia's squad for the 2022 FIFA World Cup in Qatar. He played in all three group stage matches, against Brazil, Cameroon, and Switzerland. Serbia finished fourth in the group.

Milenković was selected in Serbia's squad for the UEFA Euro 2024. He played in all three group stage matches, against England, Slovenia, and Denmark. Serbia finished fourth in the group.

== Career statistics ==
=== Club ===
As of match played 21 November 2026

Appearances and goals by club, season, and competition
Club	Season	League			National cup (Note: Includes Serbian Cup, Coppa Italia, FA Cup)		League cup (Note: Includes EFL Cup)		Europe		Other		Total	
Club	Season	Division	Apps	Goals	Apps	Goals	Apps	Goals	Apps	Goals	Apps	Goals	Apps	Goals
Teleoptik (loan)	2015–16	Serbian League Belgrade	13	0	—		—		—		—		13	0
Partizan	2015–16	Serbian SuperLiga	4	1	0	0	—		—		0	0	4	1
Partizan	2016–17	Serbian SuperLiga	32	2	6	1	—		2 (Note: Appearances in UEFA Europa League)	0	0	0	40	3
Partizan	Total		36	3	6	1	—		2	0	0	0	44	4
Fiorentina	2017–18	Serie A	16	0	1	0	—		—		—		17	0
Fiorentina	2018–19	Serie A	34	3	4	0	—		—		—		38	3
Fiorentina	2019–20	Serie A	37	5	4	0	—		—		—		41	5
Fiorentina	2020–21	Serie A	34	3	3	0	—		—		—		37	3
Fiorentina	2021–22	Serie A	34	1	5	2	—		—		—		39	3
Fiorentina	2022–23	Serie A	27	2	4	0	—		11 (Note: Appearances in UEFA Europa Conference League)	1	—		42	3
Fiorentina	2023–24	Serie A	34	0	4	0	—		11	0	1 (Note: Appearance in Supercoppa Italiana)	0	50	0
Fiorentina	Total		216	14	25	2	—		22	1	1	0	264	17
Nottingham Forest	2024–25	Premier League	37	5	2	0	1	0	—		—		40	5
Nottingham Forest	2025–26	Premier League	38	0	0	0	0	0	15	1	—		53	1
Nottingham Forest	2026–27	Premier League	7	0	0	0	0	0	0	0	—		7	0
Nottingham Forest	Total		81	5	2	0	1	0	15	1	—		100	6
Career total			347	22	33	3	1	0	39	2	1	0	421	27

=== International ===
As of match played 16 November 2026

Appearances and goals by national team and year
National team	Year	Apps	Goals
Serbia	2018	10	0
Serbia	2019	8	1
Serbia	2020	8	0
Serbia	2021	6	2
Serbia	2022	9	0
Serbia	2023	9	0
Serbia	2024	12	0
Serbia	2025	7	0
Serbia	2026	4	0
Total		73	3

Scores and results list Serbia's goal tally first, score column indicates score after each Milenković goal.

List of international goals scored by Nikola Milenković
No.	Date	Venue	Opponent	Score	Result	Competition
1	7 September 2019	Rajko Mitić Stadium, Belgrade, Serbia	Portugal	1–2	2–4	UEFA Euro 2020 qualification
2	1 September 2021	Nagyerdei Stadion, Debrecen, Hungary	Qatar	4–0	4–0	Friendly
3	4 September 2021	Rajko Mitić Stadium, Belgrade, Serbia	Luxembourg	4–1	4–1	2022 FIFA World Cup qualification

== Honours ==
Partizan

- Serbian SuperLiga: 2016–17
- Serbian Cup: 2015–16, 2016–17

Fiorentina

- Coppa Italia runner-up: 2022–23
- UEFA Conference League runner-up 2022–23

Individual

- UEFA Europa Conference League Team of the Season: 2022–23
- Nottingham Forest Player of the Season: 2024–25
- Serbian Footballer of the Year: 2025
