= Petar Đuričković =

Serbian footballer

Personal information
- Date of birth: 20 June 1991 (age 35)
- Place of birth: Priština, SFR Yugoslavia
- Height: 1.78 m (5 ft 10 in)
- Position: Attacking midfielder

Team information
- Current team: Dinamo Jug
- Number: 7

Youth career
- Radnički Niš
- Red Star Belgrade

Senior career*
Years	Team	Apps	(Gls)
2009–2011	Sopot	47	(8)
2012–2014	Red Star Belgrade	2	(0)
2012–2013	→ Radnički Kragujevac (loan)	15	(0)
2014	→ Radnički Niš (loan)	17	(0)
2015–2016	Radnički Niš	46	(5)
2016–2017	Partizan	28	(2)
2018–2020	Xanthi	62	(6)
2020–2021	Radnički Niš	27	(2)
2021–2022	Napredak Kruševac	23	(1)
2022	Kolubara	7	(1)
2023	Novi Pazar	15	(0)
2024	OFK Petrovac	15	(2)
2025–	Dinamo Jug	26	(6)
- * Club domestic league appearances and goals as of 14 May 2026

Petar Đuričković (Serbian Cyrillic: Петар Ђуричковић; born 20 June 1991) is a Serbian professional footballer who plays as an attacking midfielder for Dinamo Jug.

== Career ==
Prior to his transfer, he was a member of the Serbian champions since June 2016, won a double crown and played a total of 38 matches for Partizan in all competitions (2 goals, 4 assists). On 22 December 2017, he signed a two-and-a-half-year contract with Greek Super League club Xanthi for an undisclosed fee, and after a successful period in Greece he signed a one-year contract with Serbian club Radnički Niš on 30 September 2020. On 8 September 2021, he signed a one-year contract with Napredak Kruševac. On 24 September 2022, he signed a one-year contract with Kolubara.

== Honours ==
Red Star

- Serbian Cup: 2011–12

Partizan

- Serbian SuperLiga: 2016–17
- Serbian Cup: 2016–17

Individual

- Serbian SuperLiga Player of the Week: 2020–21 (Round 18)
