= 2017–18 Red Star Belgrade season =

Red Star
2017–18 season
- President: Svetozar Mijailović
- Manager: Vladan Milojević
- Stadium: Rajko Mitić Stadium
- Serbian SuperLiga: 1st
- Serbian Cup: Quarter finals
- UEFA Europa League: Round of 32
- Top goalscorer: League: Pešić (25); All: Pešić (29)
- Highest home attendance: 52,000 (vs Arsenal, 19 October 2017)
- Lowest home attendance: 0 (vs Spartak Subotica, 5 May 2018)
- Average home league attendance: 11,829
Home colours	Away colours

The 2017–18 season was Red Star's 12th in the Serbian SuperLiga and 72nd consecutive season in the top flight of Yugoslav and Serbian football. The club participated in the Serbian SuperLiga, the Serbian Cup and the UEFA Europa League.

It was the first time they have played in the UEFA Europa League group stage since its rebranding, having previously participated in the 2007–08 UEFA Cup. The season covered the period from 29 June 2017 to 19 May 2018.

== Competitions ==
=== Overview ===
Competition	Record							
Competition	P	W	D	L	GF	GA	GD	Win %
Serbian SuperLiga	37	32	4	1	96	19	+77	86.49
Serbian Cup	3	2	1	0	9	0	+9	66.67
UEFA Europa League	16	7	6	3	19	11	+8	43.75
Total	56	41	11	4	124	30	+94	73.21

=== Serbian SuperLiga ===
==== Regular season ====
Pos	Team	Pld	W	D	L	GF	GA	GD	Pts	Qualification
1	Red Star Belgrade	30	25	4	1	75	15	+60	77 (Note: Red Star were deducted two points.)	Qualification for the Championship round
2	Partizan	30	20	7	3	59	23	+36	65 (Note: Partizan were deducted two points.)	Qualification for the Championship round
3	Čukarički	30	14	9	7	43	26	+17	51	Qualification for the Championship round
4	Radnički Niš	30	14	8	8	46	40	+6	50	Qualification for the Championship round
5	Spartak Subotica	30	14	7	9	55	39	+16	49	Qualification for the Championship round

Source: SuperLiga (in Serbian), Soccerway
Rules for classification: 1) Points; 2) Head-to-head points; 3) Head-to-head goal difference; 4) Head-to-head goals scored; 5) Head-to-head away goals scored (if two teams tied); 6) Goal difference; 7) Goals scored; 8) Fair play ranking; 9) Draw.

===== Results summary =====
Overall								Home						Away					
Pld	W	D	L	GF	GA	GD	Pts	W	D	L	GF	GA	GD	W	D	L	GF	GA	GD
30	25	4	1	75	15	+60	79	13	2	0	41	6	+35	12	2	1	34	9	+25

===== Round by round =====
Round	1	2	3	4	5	6	7	8	9	10	11	12	13	14	15	16	17	18	19	20	21	22	23	24	25	26	27	28	29	30
Result	W	W	W	W	W	W	D	W	W	W	W	L	W	W	W	W	W	W	W	D	W	D	W	W	W	W	D	W	W	W
Position	2	3	1	1	1	1	1	1	1	1	1	1	1	1	1	1	1	1	1	1	1	1	1	1	1	1	1	1	1	1

W = Win; D = Draw; L = Loss

===== Matches =====
23 July 2017 R1	Red Star	3–0	Radnički	Rajko Mitić Stadium, Belgrade
19:00	Pešić 40'; Srnić 57', 87'	Report		Attendance: 5,000; Referee: Aleksandar Vasić

30 July 2017 R2	Rad	0–2	Red Star	King Peter I Stadium, Belgrade
19:00		Report	Le Tallec 38'; Pešić 90'	Attendance: 2,000; Referee: Novica Anđelovski

6 August 2017 R3	Red Star	3–0	Čukarički	Rajko Mitić Stadium, Belgrade
20:00	Pešić 20', 74'; Stojković 81'	Report		Attendance: 7,418; Referee: Milorad Mažić

10 August 2017 R4	Radnik	0–5	Red Star	Surdulica City Stadium, Surdulica
20:00		Report	Boakye 18' (pen.), 76'; Donald 51'; Pejčić 52' (o.g.); Srnić 54'	Attendance: 2,500; Referee: Nenad Đokić

13 August 2017 R5	Red Star	3–1	Bačka	Rajko Mitić Stadium, Belgrade
17:00	Pešić 38'; Frimpong 54'; Račić 86'	Report	Čeković 82'	Attendance: 12,400; Referee: Petar Piper

20 September 2017 R6	Borac	0–2	Red Star	Čačak Stadium, Čačak
17:00		Report	Milić 35'; Boakye 75'	Attendance: 1,500; Referee: Časlav Lukić

27 August 2017 R7	Red Star	0–0	Partizan	Rajko Mitić Stadium, Belgrade
19:00		Report		Attendance: 33,000; Referee: Danilo Grujić

9 September 2017 R8	Javor	0–2	Red Star	Ivanjica Stadium, Ivanjica
19:00		Report	Ricardinho 15'; Donald 25'	Attendance: 1,600; Referee: Aleksandar Vasić

25 October 2017 R9	Red Star	1–0	Spartak	Rajko Mitić Stadium, Belgrade
18:00	Boakye 22' (pen.)	Report		Attendance: 4,172; Referee: Dragan Čolović

17 September 2017 R10	Voždovac	0–2	Red Star	Voždovac Stadium, Belgrade
17:00		Report	Donald 41'; Kanga 90'	Attendance: 1,000; Referee: Bojan Nikolić

24 September 2017 R11	Red Star	2–0	Vojvodina	Rajko Mitić Stadium, Belgrade
17:00	Donald 29'; Kanga 63'	Report		Attendance: 8,200; Referee: Vlado Glođović

30 September 2017 R12	Napredak	1–0	Red Star	Mladost Stadium, Kruševac
17:00	Mitrović 90'	Report		Attendance: 6,000; Referee: Milorad Mažić

14 October 2017 R13	Red Star	4–0	Mačva	Rajko Mitić Stadium, Belgrade
16:00	Boakye 20'; Protić 29' (o.g.); Pešić 53'; L. Ilić 90'	Report		Attendance: 8,000; Referee: Dejan Santrač

22 October 2017 R14	Red Star	2–1	Mladost	Rajko Mitić Stadium, Belgrade
19:00	Pešić 26'; Račić 40'	Report	Radivojević 50'	Attendance: 6,780; Referee: Jovan Šegrt

29 October 2017 R15	Zemun	0–1	Red Star	Zemun Stadium, Belgrade
13:00		Report	Boakye 82'	Attendance: 3,500; Referee: Bojan Nikolić

5 November 2017 R16	Radnički	0–4	Red Star	Čair Stadium, Niš
17:00		Report	Kanga 25'; Pešić 37', 45' (pen.), 74'	Attendance: 7,000; Referee: Jovan Šegrt

18 November 2017 R17	Red Star	6–1	Rad	Rajko Mitić Stadium, Belgrade
16:00	Pešić 4', 54'; Boakye 20' (pen.), 26', 63', 84'	Report	Lutovac 41'	Attendance: 10,000; Referee: Petar Piper

25 November 2017 R18	Čukarički	1–2	Red Star	Čukarički Stadium, Belgrade
15:00	Mićin 41'	Report	Boakye 58' (pen.), 69'	Attendance: 2,000; Referee: Dejan Santrač

29 November 2017 R19	Red Star	5–0	Radnik	Rajko Mitić Stadium, Belgrade
18:00	Gobeljić 11'; Pešić 45', 71', 77'; Jovičić 90' (pen.)	Report		Attendance: 4,353; Referee: Srđan Jovanović

3 December 2017 R20	Bačka	2–2	Red Star	Stadion Slavko Maletin Vava, Bačka Palanka
13:00	Đorić 27'; Makarić 78'	Report	Boakye 54', 86' (pen.)	Attendance: 4,000; Referee: Marko Popović

10 December 2017 R21	Red Star	3–0	Borac	Rajko Mitić Stadium, Belgrade
16:30	Adžić 36'; Pešić 50', 63'	Report		Attendance: 5,389; Referee: Ilija Brdar

13 December 2017 R22	Partizan	1–1	Red Star	Partizan Stadium, Belgrade
18:00	Soumah 62' (pen.)	Report	Boakye 82'	Attendance: 14,874; Referee: Milorad Mažić

17 February 2018 R23	Red Star	3–0	Javor	Rajko Mitić Stadium, Belgrade
14:30	Adžić 6'; Pešić 29' (pen.), 71'	Report		Attendance: 7,588; Referee: Ilija Brdar

24 February 2018 R24	Spartak	1–2	Red Star	Subotica City Stadium, Subotica
13:00	Đuričin 39'	Report	Rodić 41', 45'	Attendance: 2,000; Referee: Branko Stojaković

3 March 2018 R25	Red Star	2–1	Voždovac	Rajko Mitić Stadium, Belgrade
16:30	Rodić 46'; Krstičić 90'	Report	Pavlović 88'	Attendance: 10,300; Referee: Novak Simović

7 March 2018 R26	Vojvodina	1–2	Red Star	Karađorđe Stadium, Novi Sad
18:00	Eze 73'	Report	Donald 2'; Ben 84' (pen.)	Attendance: 8,500; Referee: Jovan Šegrt

10 March 2018 R27	Red Star	1–1	Napredak	Rajko Mitić Stadium, Belgrade
18:30	Krstičić 52'	Report	Eskić 90'	Attendance: 10,351; Referee: Majo Vujović

18 March 2018 R28	Mačva	0–2	Red Star	Gradski stadion, Šabac
17:00		Report	Adžić 65'; Ben 75'	Attendance: 6,000; Referee: Branko Stojaković

1 April 2018 R29	Mladost	2–5	Red Star	Mladost Stadium, Lučani
17:00	Pavlovic 36', 74'		Srnić 18'; Babić 44'; Pešić 56' (pen.), 84'; Ilić 82'	Attendance: 8,000; Referee: Srđan Obradović

5 April 2018 R30	Red Star	3-1	Zemun	Rajko Mitić Stadium, Belgrade
17:00	Ben 4', 18'; Pešić 12'	Report	Vukadinović 51'	Attendance: 9,500; Referee: Zoran Široki

==== Championship round ====
Pos	Team	Pld	W	D	L	GF	GA	GD	Pts	Qualification
1	Red Star Belgrade (C)	37	32	4	1	96	19	+77	60	Qualification for the Champions League first qualifying round
2	Partizan	37	23	8	6	71	33	+38	43	Qualification for the Europa League first qualifying round (Note: Since the winners of the 2017–18 Serbian Cup, Partizan, qualified for European competition based on league position, the spot awarded to the cup winners (Europa League first qualifying round) was passed to the fourth-placed team.)
3	Radnički Niš	37	18	8	11	63	51	+12	37 (Note: Radnički Niš finished ahead of Spartak Subotica on regular season points: Radnički 50 pts, Spartak 49 pts.)	Qualification for the Europa League first qualifying round
4	Spartak Subotica	37	18	7	12	62	49	+13	37	Qualification for the Europa League first qualifying round
5	Voždovac	37	16	8	13	48	42	+6	33	
6	Čukarički	37	16	9	12	54	44	+10	32	
7	Napredak Kruševac	37	15	8	14	57	55	+2	30	
8	Vojvodina	37	14	8	15	43	43	0	28	

Source: UEFA, Soccerway
Rules for classification: 1) Points; 2) Points in regular season; 3) Head-to-head points in regular season; 4) Head-to-head goal difference in regular season; 5) Head-to-head goals scored in regular season; 6) Head-to-head away goals scored in regular season (if two teams tied); 7) Goal difference; 8) Goals scored; 9) Fair play ranking; 10) Play-off (if two teams tied and need to decide champion or teams for UEFA competitions); 11) Drawing of lots.
(C) Champions

===== Results summary =====
Overall								Home						Away					
Pld	W	D	L	GF	GA	GD	Pts	W	D	L	GF	GA	GD	W	D	L	GF	GA	GD
7	7	0	0	21	4	+17	21	4	0	0	14	2	+12	3	0	0	7	2	+5

===== Round by round =====
Round	1	2	3	4	5	6	7
Result	W	W	W	W	W	W	W
Position	1	1	1	1	1	1	1

W = Win; D = Draw; L = Loss

===== Matches =====
14 April 2018 R31	Red Star	2–1	Partizan	Rajko Mitić Stadium, Belgrade
18:30	Radonjić 18'; Pešić 21'	Report	Ožegović 90' (pen.)	Attendance: 35,131; Referee: Danilo Grujić

21 April 2018 R32	Radnički	1–3	Red Star	Stadion Čair, Niš
19:00	Pavkov 43'	Report	Krstičić 7'; Pešić 57' (pen.); Ben 59'	Referee: Majo Vujović

25 April 2018 R33	Red Star	3–0	Čukarički	Rajko Mitić Stadium, Belgrade
18:00	Ben 61'; Radonjić 77'; Adžić 84'	Report		Attendance: 7,161; Referee: Nenad Đokić

29 April 2018 R34	Napredak	0–2	Red Star	Mladost Stadium, Kruševac
16:00		Report	Krstičić 78'; Pešić 89' (pen.)	Attendance: 7,000; Referee: Miloš Đorđić

5 May 2018 R35	Red Star	4–0	Spartak	Rajko Mitić Stadium, Belgrade
20:00	Radonjić 6'; Joveljić 37' (pen.), 63'; Ben 43'	Report		Attendance: 0 Referee: Bojan Nikolić

13 May 2018 R36	Vojvodina	1–2	Red Star	Karađorđe Stadium, Novi Sad
17:00	Arsić 23'	Report	Radonjić 38'; Milić 74'	Attendance: 6,000; Referee: Novica Anđelovski

19 May 2018 R37	Red Star	5–1	Voždovac	Rajko Mitić Stadium, Belgrade
20:00	Ben 18'; Radonjić 21'; Joveljić 52'; Donald 74'; Račić 89'	Report	Luković 72'	Attendance: 40,000; Referee: Majo Vujović

=== Serbian Cup ===
==== First round ====
11 October 2017 R1	Red Star	5–0	Dinamo Vranje	Rajko Mitić Stadium, Belgrade
18:00	Adžić 25', 45', 60'; Pešić 44'; Srnić 76'	Report		Attendance: 2,000; Referee: Momčilo Marković

==== Second round ====
15 November 2017 R2	Borac	0–4	Red Star	Čačak Stadium, Čačak
16:00		Report	Milić 3'; Pešić 29', 84' (pen.); Milijaš 73'	Attendance: 2.000. Referee: Srđan Obradović

==== Quarter finals ====
14 March 2018 QF	Mačva Šabac	0–0 (5–4 p)	Red Star	Gradski stadion, Šabac
15:30		Report		Attendance: 5,000; Referee: Dejan Santrač
	Penalties
	Matić (penalty scored); Gavrić (penalty scored); Milinković (penalty scored); Obrovac (penalty scored); Pejović (penalty scored)		Babić (penalty scored); Pešić (penalty scored); Krstičić (penalty scored); Milijaš (penalty scored); Radonjić (penalty missed)

=== UEFA Europa League ===
==== First qualifying round ====
29 June 2017 QR1	Red Star (Serbia)	3–0	(Malta) Floriana	Rajko Mitić Stadium, Belgrade
20:30	Boakye 45+5' (pen.), 89'; Srnić 78'	Report		Attendance: 19,823; Referee: Mattias Gestranius (Finland)

6 July 2017 QR1	Floriana (Malta)	3–3 (6–3 agg.)	(Serbia) Red Star	Hibernians Stadium, Paola
20:30	Pisani 45+3' (pen.); Vella 78'; Varela 84'	Report	Boakye 13', 70'; Milijaš 76'	Attendance: 1,176; Referee: Georgios Kyzas (Greece)

==== Second qualifying round ====
13 July 2017 QR2	Irtysh Pavlodar (Kazakhstan)	1–1	(Serbia) Red Star	Central Stadium, Pavlodar
16:00	Živković 91+3' (pen.)	Report	Boakye 51' (pen.)	Attendance: 8,500; Referee: Marius Avram (Romania)

20 July 2017 QR2	Red Star (Serbia)	2–0 (3–1 agg.)	(Kazakhstan) Irtysh Pavlodar	Red Star Stadium, Belgrade
20:30	Donald 10'; Srnić 77'	Report		Attendance: 22,414; Referee: Fedayi San (Switzerland)

==== Third qualifying round ====
27 July 2017 QR3	Red Star (Serbia)	2–0	(Czech Republic) Sparta Prague	Red Star Stadium, Belgrade
20:30	Boakye 13'; Kanga 65'	Report		Attendance: 32,816; Referee: Sergey Lapochkin (Russia)

3 August 2017 QR3	Sparta Prague (Czech Republic)	0–1 (3–0 agg.)	(Serbia) Red Star	Generali Arena, Prague
19:00		Report	Boakye 19'	Attendance: 16,808; Referee: Tony Chapron (France)

==== Play-off round ====
17 August 2017 PO	Krasnodar (Russia)	3–2	(Serbia) Red Star	Krasnodar Stadium, Krasnodar
19:00	Ignatyev 20'; Claesson 46'; Petrov 66'	Report	Srnić 57'; Pešić 71'	Attendance: 24,587; Referee: Gediminas Mažeika (Lithuania)

24 August 2017 PO	Red Star (Serbia)	2–1 (4–4 (a) agg.)	(Russia) Krasnodar	Red Star Stadium, Belgrade
21:00	Radonjić 7'; Kanga 46'	Report	Granqvist 82' (pen.)	Attendance: 50,720; Referee: Tobias Stieler (Germany)

==== Group stage ====
Pos	Team	Pld	W	D	L	GF	GA	GD	Pts	Qualification	ARS	ZVE	KLN	BATE
1	(England) Arsenal	6	4	1	1	14	4	+10	13	Advance to knockout phase	—	0–0	3–1	6–0
2	(Serbia) Red Star Belgrade	6	2	3	1	3	2	+1	9	Advance to knockout phase	0–1	—	1–0	1–1
3	(Germany) 1. FC Köln	6	2	0	4	7	8	−1	6		1–0	0–1	—	5–2
4	(Belarus) BATE Borisov	6	1	2	3	6	16	−10	5		2–4	0–0	1–0	—

Source: UEFA

14 September 2017 MD1	Red Star (Serbia)	1–1	(Belarus) BATE Borisov	Rajko Mitić Stadium, Belgrade
21:05	Radonjić 54'	Report	Signevich 72'	Attendance: 40,284; Referee: Yevhen Aranovsky (Ukraine)

28 September 2017 MD2	1. FC Köln (Germany)	0–1	(Serbia) Red Star	RheinEnergieStadion, Cologne
19:00		Report	Boakye 30'	Attendance: 45,300; Referee: Bas Nijhuis (Netherlands)

19 October 2017 MD3	Red Star (Serbia)	0–1	(England) Arsenal	Rajko Mitić Stadium, Belgrade
19:00		Report	Giroud 85'	Attendance: 52,000; Referee: Benoît Bastien (France)

2 November 2017 MD4	Arsenal (England)	0–0	(Serbia) Red Star	Emirates Stadium, London
21:05		Report		Attendance: 58,285; Referee: Luca Banti (Italy)

23 November 2017 MD5	BATE Borisov (Belarus)	0–0	(Serbia) Red Star	Borisov Arena, Barysaw
19:00		Report		Attendance: 12,000; Referee: Svein Oddvar Moen (Norway)

7 December 2017 MD6	Red Star (Serbia)	1–0	(Germany) 1. FC Köln	Rajko Mitić Stadium, Belgrade
21:05	Srnić 22'	Report		Attendance: 51,364; Referee: Bobby Madden (Scotland)

==== Round of 32 ====
13 February 2018 R32	Red Star (Serbia)	0–0	(Russia) CSKA Moscow	Rajko Mitić Stadium, Belgrade
18:00		Report		Attendance: 35,642; Referee: Paweł Raczkowski (Poland)

21 February 2018 R32	CSKA Moscow (Russia)	1–0 (1–0 agg.)	(Serbia) Red Star	Arena CSKA, Moscow
18:00	Dzagoev 45+1'	Report		Attendance: 18,753; Referee: Jorge Sousa (Portugal)

== Squad ==
=== Squad statistics ===
No.	Name	League		Cup		Europe		Total		Discipline	
No.	Name	Apps	Goals	Apps	Goals	Apps	Goals	Apps	Goals	Yellow card	Red card
Goalkeepers
1	(Serbia) Damir Kahriman	4	0	0	0	0	0	4	0	1	0
27	(Bosnia and Herzegovina) Nemanja Supić	2	0	0	0	0	0	2	0	1	0
82	(Canada) Milan Borjan	31	0	3	0	12	0	46	0	8	0
Defenders
4	(France) Damien Le Tallec	26	1	1	0	15	0	42	1	7	0
5	(Ghana) Abraham Frimpong	11	1	2	0	3	0	16	1	3	0
15	(Serbia) Srđan Babić	25	1	2	0	3	0	30	1	7	0
23	(Serbia) Milan Rodić	29	3	1	0	9	0	39	3	5	2
30	(Montenegro) Filip Stojković	30	1	3	0	16	0	49	1	9	0
33	(Serbia) Dušan Anđelković	9	0	1	0	5	0	15	0	1	0
34	(Serbia) Stefan Hajdin	1	0	1	0	0	0	2	0	0	0
77	(Serbia) Marko Gobeljić	23	1	3	0	10	0	36	1	3	1
90	(Serbia) Vujadin Savić	17	0	2	0	15	0	34	0	5	0
Midfielders
3	(Serbia) Branko Jovičić	16	1	1	0	7	0	24	1	2	0
6	(Serbia) Uroš Račić	22	3	2	0	10	0	34	3	5	0
7	(Serbia) Nenad Krstičić	27	4	1	0	8	0	36	4	3	0
10	(Serbia) Nenad Milijaš	30	0	3	1	4	1	37	2	4	0
11	(Serbia) Luka Adžić	26	4	1	3	2	0	29	7	1	0
20	(Netherlands) Mitchell Donald	22	6	0	0	15	1	37	7	7	1
40	(Serbia) Luka Ilić	14	2	2	0	1	0	17	2	0	0
49	(Serbia) Nemanja Radonjić	28	5	1	0	10	2	39	7	3	0
55	(Serbia) Slavoljub Srnić	28	4	3	1	15	4	46	9	6	0
95	(Serbia) Ivan Ilić	0	0	1	0	0	0	1	0	0	0
Forwards
16	(Serbia) Nemanja Milić	13	2	2	1	9	0	24	3	1	0
28	(Serbia) Dejan Joveljić	4	3	0	0	0	0	4	3	1	0
31	(Comoros) Ben	14	8	0	0	2	0	16	8	1	0
45	(Serbia) Aleksandar Pešić	35	25	3	3	13	1	51	29	3	0
Players sold or loaned out during the season
GK	(Serbia) Filip Manojlović	0	0	0	0	4	0	4	0	0	0
MF	(Serbia) Filip Bainović	0	0	2	0	0	0	2	0	0	0
MF	(Gabon) Guélor Kanga	14	3	0	0	12	2	26	5	5	0
MF	(Costa Rica) John Jairo Ruiz	0	0	0	0	2	0	2	0	0	0
MF	(Brazil) Ricardinho	3	1	1	0	6	0	10	1	1	0
FW	(Ghana) Richmond Boakye	14	15	0	0	14	8	28	23	3	0
FW	(Serbia) Milan Pavkov	0	0	0	0	1	0	1	0	0	0

As of 19 May 2018

=== Goalscorers ===
Includes all competitive matches. The list is sorted by shirt number when total goals are equal.

As of 19 May 2018

Rank	Pos	No.	Player	League	Cup	Europa League	Total
1	FW	45	(Serbia) Aleksandar Pešić	25	3	1	29
2	FW	14	(Ghana) Richmond Boakye	15	0	8	23
3	MF	55	(Serbia) Slavoljub Srnić	4	1	4	9
4	FW	31	(Comoros) Ben	8	0	0	8
5	MF	11	(Serbia) Luka Adžić	4	3	0	7
5	MF	20	(Netherlands) Mitchell Donald	6	0	1	7
5	MF	49	(Serbia) Nemanja Radonjić	5	0	2	7
8	MF	8	(Gabon) Guélor Kanga	3	0	2	5
9	MF	7	(Serbia) Nenad Krstičić	4	0	0	4
10	MF	6	(Serbia) Uroš Račić	3	0	0	3
10	FW	16	(Serbia) Nemanja Milić	2	1	0	3
10	DF	23	(Serbia) Milan Rodić	3	0	0	3
10	FW	28	(Serbia) Dejan Joveljić	3	0	0	3
14	MF	10	(Serbia) Nenad Milijaš	0	1	1	2
14	MF	40	(Serbia) Luka Ilić	2	0	0	2
16	MF	3	(Serbia) Branko Jovičić	1	0	0	1
16	MF	4	(France) Damien Le Tallec	1	0	0	1
16	DF	5	(Ghana) Abraham Frimpong	1	0	0	1
16	DF	15	(Serbia) Srđan Babić	1	0	0	1
16	DF	30	(Montenegro) Filip Stojković	1	0	0	1
16	DF	77	(Serbia) Marko Gobeljić	1	0	0	1
16	MF	89	(Brazil) Ricardinho	1	0	0	1
Own goals				2	0	0	2
TOTALS				96	9	19	124

=== Clean sheets ===
Includes all competitive matches. The list is sorted by shirt number when total clean sheets are equal.

As of 5 May 2018

Rank	No.	Player	League	Cup	Europa League	Total
1	82	(Canada) Milan Borjan	16	3	7	26
2	1	(Serbia) Damir Kahriman	3	0	0	3
3	22	(Serbia) Filip Manojlović	0	0	2	2
4	27	(Bosnia and Herzegovina) Nemanja Supić	1	0	0	1
TOTALS			20	3	9	32

== Transfers ==
=== In ===
#	Position	Player	Transferred from	Date	Fee
77	DF	(Serbia) Marko Gobeljić	(Serbia) Napredak Kruševac	7 June 2017	Undisclosed (~ €100,000)
30	DF	(Montenegro) Filip Stojković	(Germany) 1860 Munich	12 June 2017	Free
89	MF	(Brazil) Ricardinho	(Moldova) Sheriff Tiraspol	16 June 2017	Free
90	DF	(Serbia) Vujadin Savić	(Moldova) Sheriff Tiraspol	17 June 2017	Free
14	FW	(Ghana) Richmond Boakye	(Italy) Latina	27 June 2017	Free
45	FW	(Serbia) Aleksandar Pešić	(France) Toulouse	4 July 2017	Undisclosed (~ €750,000)
15	DF	(Serbia) Srđan Babić	(Spain) Real Sociedad	7 July 2017	Loan
44	DF	(Brazil) Zé Marcos	(Brazil) Atlético Paranaense	7 July 2017	Free
3	MF	(Serbia) Branko Jovičić	(Russia) Amkar Perm	8 July 2017	Undisclosed (~ €500,000)
–	MF	(Serbia) Damjan Gojkov	(Serbia) OFK Beograd	10 July 2017	Undisclosed
23	DF	(Serbia) Milan Rodić	(Russia) Krylia Sovetov	21 July 2017	Undisclosed (~ €250,000)
49	MF	(Serbia) Nemanja Radonjić	(Italy) Roma	21 July 2017	Loan
82	GK	(Canada) Milan Borjan	(Bulgaria) Ludogorets	24 July 2017	Free
40	MF	(Serbia) Luka Ilić	(England) Manchester City	7 August 2017	Loan
95	MF	(Serbia) Ivan Ilić	(England) Manchester City	7 August 2017	Loan
7	MF	(Serbia) Nenad Krstičić	(Spain) Alavés	23 August 2017	Free
21	MF	(Serbia) Filip Bainović	(Serbia) Rad	23 August 2017	Undisclosed
31	FW	(Comoros) Ben Nabouhane	(Greece) Olympiacos	12 January 2018	Undisclosed (~ €500,000)
34	DF	(Serbia) Stefan Hajdin	(Serbia) Spartak Subotica	13 January 2018	Undisclosed (~ €200,000)
15	DF	(Serbia) Srđan Babić	(Spain) Real Sociedad	5 February 2018	€800,000

=== Out ===
#	Position	Player	Transferred to	Date	Fee
17	MF	(Serbia) Srđan Plavšić	(Czech Republic) Sparta Prague	27 June 2017	Undisclosed (~ €1,300,000)
3	DF	(Serbia) Aleksandar Luković	–	30 June 2017	Retired
81	FW	(Serbia) Predrag Sikimić	(Kazakhstan) Atyrau	30 June 2017	Free
93	MF	(Serbia) Marko Poletanović	(Belgium) Gent	30 June 2017	Loan return
–	GK	(Montenegro) Maksim Milović	(Serbia) Voždovac	30 June 2017	Free
99	FW	(Montenegro) Petar Orlandić	(Portugal) C.F. União	30 June 2017	Free
14	FW	(Ghana) Richmond Boakye	(Italy) Latina	30 June 2017	Loan return
73	MF	(Serbia) Mihailo Ristić	(Russia) Krasnodar	30 June 2017	Undisclosed (~ €2,000,000)
2	DF	(Serbia) Marko Petković	(Russia) Spartak Moscow	1 July 2017	Free
69	FW	(Serbia) Srđan Vujaklija	(Kazakhstan) Ordabasy	7 July 2017	Free
–	FW	(Serbia) Stefan Ilić	(Serbia) Bežanija	7 July 2017	Free
–	FW	(Serbia) Marko Platiša	(Malta) Balzan	21 July 2017	Free
22	GK	(Serbia) Filip Manojlović	(Spain) Getafe	22 July 2017	Undisclosed (~ €1,250,000)
–	DF	(Serbia) Filip Maksić	(Czech Republic) Sparta Prague	26 July 2017	Free
–	DF	(Montenegro) Balša Goranović	(Montenegro) Zeta	26 July 2017	Free
–	DF	(Serbia) Filip Stanković	(Serbia) Radnički Niš	29 July 2017	Free
94	MF	(Montenegro) Vladimir Jovović	(Czech Republic) Jablonec	1 August 2017	Free
40	MF	(Serbia) Luka Ilić	(England) Manchester City	7 August 2017	Undisclosed
95	MF	(Serbia) Ivan Ilić	(England) Manchester City	7 August 2017	Undisclosed
7	MF	(Costa Rica) John Jairo Ruiz	(Saudi Arabia) Al-Fayha	9 August 2017	Undisclosed (~ €500,000)
–	MF	(Serbia) Đorđe Petrović	(Serbia) Prva Iskra	16 August 2017	Free
–	MF	(Serbia) Nemanja Tomašević	(Serbia) Rad	23 August 2017	Free
–	FW	(Serbia) Milan Panović	(Serbia) Radnički Beograd	23 August 2017	Free
–	DF	(Serbia) Marko Mijailović	(Serbia) Rad	23 August 2017	Free
–	GK	(Serbia) Uroš Kostić	(Serbia) BSK Borča	23 August 2017	Free
–	DF	(North Macedonia) Antonio Mitrev	(Malta) Balzan	31 August 2017	Free
–	MF	(Serbia) Milan Milanović	(Serbia) Dinamo Vranje	31 August 2017	Free
–	MF	(Serbia) Stefan Mihajlović	(Serbia) Voždovac	31 August 2017	Free
89	MF	(Brazil) Ricardinho	(Russia) Tosno	23 December 2017	Free
–	DF	(Serbia) Miloš Stojanović	(Serbia) Voždovac	23 January 2018	Free
8	MF	(Gabon) Guelor Kanga	(Czech Republic) Sparta Prague	2 February 2018	Undisclosed (~ €1,000,000)
–	DF	(Serbia) Stefan Milošević	(Serbia) Spartak Subotica	8 February 2018	Free
14	FW	(Ghana) Richmond Boakye	(China) Jiangsu Suning	28 February 2018	€5,500,000

=== Loan return and promoted ===
#	Position	Player	Returned from	Date
–	FW	(Serbia) Marko Platiša	(Serbia) Grafičar Beograd	30 June 2017
–	MF	(Serbia) Milan Senić	(Serbia) OFK Beograd	30 June 2017
–	FW	(Serbia) Lazar Romanić	(Serbia) OFK Beograd	30 June 2017
–	DF	(Serbia) Draško Đorđević	(Serbia) OFK Beograd	30 June 2017
41	GK	(Serbia) Jovan Vićić	(Serbia) Bežanija	30 June 2017
–	FW	(Serbia) Milan Panović	(Serbia) Bežanija	30 June 2017
34	DF	(Serbia) Miloš Stojanović	(Serbia) Bežanija	30 June 2017
–	DF	(Serbia) Marko Mijailović	(Serbia) Bežanija	30 June 2017
32	GK	(Serbia) Aleksandar Stanković	(Serbia) Grafičar Beograd	30 June 2017
94	MF	(Montenegro) Vladimir Jovović	(Serbia) Spartak Subotica	30 June 2017
–	GK	(Serbia) Ilija Ćatić	(Serbia) Grafičar Beograd	30 June 2017
–	MF	(Serbia) Andrija Crnadak	(Serbia) Grafičar Beograd	30 June 2017
–	MF	(Serbia) Milan Milanović	(Serbia) Grafičar Beograd	30 June 2017
–	MF	(Serbia) Viktor Živojinović	(Serbia) Grafičar Beograd	30 June 2017
–	MF	(Serbia) Miloš Nikolić	(Serbia) Grafičar Beograd	30 June 2017
–	MF	(Serbia) Nikola Puzić	(Serbia) Grafičar Beograd	30 June 2017
–	FW	(Serbia) Stefan Ilić	(Serbia) Radnički Niš	30 June 2017
–	FW	(North Macedonia) Darko Grozdanoski	(Serbia) BASK	30 June 2017
40	MF	(Serbia) Luka Ilić	Promoted from youth	30 June 2017
–	DF	(Serbia) Miloš Stojanović	(Serbia) Sinđelić Beograd	23 January 2018
–	FW	(Serbia) Vanja Vučićević	(Serbia) Borac Čačak	24 January 2018

=== Loan out ===
#	Position	Player	Loaned to	Date
9	FW	(Serbia) Milan Pavkov	(Serbia) Radnički Niš	28 July 2017
–	FW	(Serbia) Lazar Romanić	(Serbia) Borac Čačak	8 August 2017
–	DF	(Serbia) Bogdan Račić	(Serbia) Sremac Vojka	9 August 2017
–	MF	(Serbia) Damjan Gojkov	(Serbia) Bežanija	17 August 2017
34	DF	(Serbia) Miloš Stojanović	(Serbia) Sinđelić Beograd	18 August 2017
32	GK	(Serbia) Aleksandar Stanković	(Serbia) Grafičar Beograd	22 August 2017
–	FW	(Iceland) Đorđe Panić	(Serbia) Grafičar Beograd	23 August 2017
–	FW	(Serbia) Stefan Vudragović	(Serbia) Grafičar Beograd	23 August 2017
–	MF	(Serbia) Andrija Crnadak	(Serbia) Grafičar Beograd	23 August 2017
–	DF	(Serbia) Marko Konatar	(Serbia) Grafičar Beograd	23 August 2017
–	FW	(Serbia) Aleksandar Bogdanović	(Serbia) Grafičar Beograd	23 August 2017
–	MF	(Serbia) Miloš Z. Nikolić	(Serbia) Grafičar Beograd	23 August 2017
–	MF	(Serbia) Nikola Puzić	(Serbia) Grafičar Beograd	23 August 2017
–	GK	(Serbia) Ilija Ćatić	(Serbia) Grafičar Beograd	23 August 2017
–	MF	(Serbia) Viktor Živojinović	(Serbia) Grafičar Beograd	23 August 2017
–	MF	(Bosnia and Herzegovina) Jovan Ilić	(Serbia) Grafičar Beograd	23 August 2017
–	MF	(Serbia) Stefan Cvetković	(Serbia) Grafičar Beograd	23 August 2017
–	FW	(North Macedonia) Darko Grozdanoski	(Serbia) Žarkovo	23 August 2017
–	GK	(Serbia) Strahinja Savić	(Serbia) Sopot	23 August 2017
23	MF	(Serbia) Andrija Luković	(Serbia) Voždovac	30 August 2017
–	MF	(Serbia) Draško Đorđević	(Serbia) Bežanija	31 August 2017
–	DF	(Brazil) Mateus Viveiros	(Serbia) Bežanija	31 August 2017
–	DF	(Serbia) Nemanja Stojić	(Serbia) Grafičar Beograd	31 August 2017
–	MF	(Serbia) Milan Senić	(Hungary) Siófok	31 August 2017
98	FW	(Serbia) Vanja Vučićević	(Serbia) Borac Čačak	31 August 2017
44	DF	(Brazil) Zé Marcos	(Serbia) Rad	25 January 2018
21	MF	(Serbia) Filip Bainović	(Serbia) Rad	25 January 2018
98	FW	(Serbia) Vanja Vučićević	(Serbia) Spartak Subotica	8 February 2018
19	MF	(Serbia) Veljko Nikolić	(Serbia) Grafičar Beograd	9 February 2018
24	DF	(Serbia) Slađan Rakić	(Serbia) Grafičar Beograd	9 February 2018
73	FW	(Serbia) Jug Stanojev	(Serbia) Grafičar Beograd	9 February 2018
93	DF	(Serbia) Aleksa Terzić	(Serbia) Grafičar Beograd	9 February 2018

== See also ==
- 2017–18 KK Crvena zvezda season
