= 2016–17 Serbian Cup =

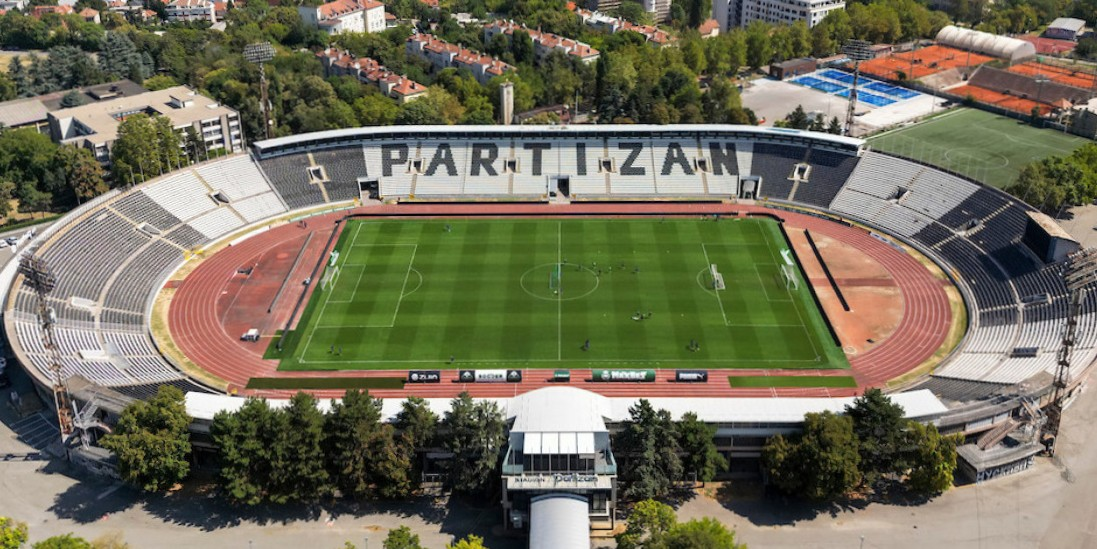
- Partizan Stadium hosted the final

Tournament details
- Country: Serbia
- Teams: 35

Final positions
- Champions: Partizan
- Runners-up: Red Star Belgrade

Tournament statistics
- Matches played: 36
- Goals scored: 100 (2.78 per match)
- Top goal scorer(s): Nikola Nešović (Sloboda) (5 goals)

The 2016–17 Serbian Cup season was the eleventh season of the Serbian national football tournament.

The competition started in September 2016, and ended in May 2017.

The winner of the competition qualified for the 2017–18 UEFA Europa League.

== Calendar ==
Round	Date(s)	Number of fixtures	Clubs	New entries this round
Preliminary round	7 September 2016	3	35 → 32	9
Round of 32	21 September 2016	16	32 → 16	26
Round of 16	26 October 2016	8	16 → 8	none
Quarter-finals	5 April 2017	4	8 → 4	none
Semi-finals	26 April and 10 May 2017	4	4 → 2	none
Final	27 May 2017	1	2 → 1	none

== Preliminary round ==
A preliminary round was held in order to reduce the number of teams competing in the first round to 32. It consisted of 3 single-legged ties, with a penalty shoot-out as the decider if the score was tied after 90 minutes. This round featured the bottom 5 teams from the 2015–16 Serbian First League, as well as 5 regional cup winners. The draw was held on 3 September 2016, and contained seeded and unseeded teams. The bottom 5 teams from the 2015–16 Serbian First League (Dinamo Vranje, Sloboda Užice, Donji Srem, Loznica and Radnički 1923) were set as unseeded teams, with the 5 regional cup winners (Žarkovo, Radan Lebane, Polet Ljubić, Mladost Bački Jarak and Trepča) being set as seeded teams. The draw was conducted with the idea of minimizing expenses for the participating clubs. The matches were played on 7 September 2016. Donji Srem was dissolved after the end of 2015–16 season, so Mladost Bački Jarak, which was drawn against Donji Srem, received an automatic bye to the first round. Furthermore, Sloga PM, which earned a place in the first round via last season's final position in the First League, was also dissolved. Thus, both teams from the proposed tie Radan Lebane - Dinamo Vranje received an automatic bye to the first round. In total, around 1,050 spectators attended the games (avg. 350 per game).

7 September 2016	Žarkovo (III)	1–1 (4–3 p)	Loznica (III)	Stadion Kralj Petar I, Belgrade
16:00	Stevanović 1'		27' N. Đurić	Attendance: 250; Referee: Ana Minić
	Penalties
	N. Stojanović (penalty scored); G. Janković (penalty scored); Jeremić (penalty scored); Bainović (penalty missed); Aničić (penalty scored)		(penalty scored) Maksimović; (penalty scored) Matić; (penalty scored) Nikolić; (penalty missed) D. Janković; (penalty missed) N. Đurić

7 September 2016	Polet Ljubić (III)	2–0	Radnički 1923 (III)	Stadion FK Polet, Ljubić
16:00	Strizović 40'; Knežević 71'			Attendance: 300; Referee: Ljubiša Borisavljević

7 September 2016	Trepča (IV)	0–3	Sloboda Užice (II)	Gradski stadion, Zvečan
16:00			23', 54' Đerić; 45' Nešović	Attendance: 500; Referee: Dragan Čolović

Radan Lebane (III)	bye	Dinamo Vranje (II)

Mladost Bački Jarak (IV)	bye

== Round of 32 ==
In this round, six teams that advanced from the previous round were joined by all 16 teams from the 2015–16 Serbian SuperLiga, as well as the top 11 teams from the 2015–16 Serbian First League, with the exception of the dissolved Sloga PM. The draw was held on 12 September 2016, and contained seeded (16 teams from 2015–16 Serbian SuperLiga) and unseeded teams. Drawing of the lots was conducted by former national team player and head coach Vladimir Petrović. Teams that played below Serbian First League in the previous season (Žarkovo, Radan Lebane, Polet Ljubić and Mladost Bački Jarak) were automatically named as hosts. The matches were played on 20 and 21 September 2016. No extra time was played if the score was tied after the regular 90 minutes. Those games went straight to penalties. In total, around 16,800 spectators attended the games (avg. 1,050 per game).

20 September 2016	OFK Bačka	0–3	Spartak Subotica	Stadion Slavko Maletin Vava, Bačka Palanka
16:00			21' Krmar; 33' Mudrinski; 62' Ivanović	Attendance: 700; Referee: Srđan Jovanović

20 September 2016	Rad	1–0	Dinamo Vranje (II)	Stadion Kralj Petar I, Belgrade
19:00	Petković 31'		(yellow card) 85' (yellow-red card) Mitić	Attendance: 400; Referee: Đorđe Maksimović

21 September 2016	Radan Lebane (III)	0–5	Čukarički	Gradski stadion, Lebane
16:00			14' Mandić; 40' Fofana; 51' Srnić; 78' Jovanović; 89' Ožegović	Attendance: 3000; Referee: Miloš Milanović

21 September 2016	Inđija (II)	0–1	Voždovac	Stadion FK Inđija, Inđija
16:00			86' Dražić	Attendance: 400; Referee: Marko Srećković

21 September 2016	Kolubara (II)	0–4	Mladost Lučani	Stadion FK Kolubara, Lazarevac
16:00			7', 38' (pen.) Milosavljević; 34', 66' Simić	Attendance: 600; Referee: Robert Kiš Čepegi

21 September 2016	Mladost Bački Jarak (IV)	1–4	Novi Pazar	Stadion Livadica, Bački Jarak
16:00	Đorđević 48'		7' Travančić; 25' Vusljanin; 54' Lepović; 89' Čečarić	Attendance: 2000; Referee: Momčilo Marković

21 September 2016	Žarkovo (III)	2–2 (5–4 p)	Metalac Gornji Milanovac	Stadion Kralj Petar I, Belgrade
16:00	Guzina 56', 80'		16' Rovčanin; 44' Stojković	Attendance: 300; Referee: Nenad Minaković
	Penalties
	Rajić (penalty scored); Janković (penalty scored); Guzina (penalty scored); N. Stojanović (penalty scored); Aničić (penalty scored)		(penalty missed) Mladenović; (penalty scored) Jovanović; (penalty scored) Simović; (penalty scored) Mijić; (penalty scored) Rovčanin

21 September 2016	Sinđelić Beograd (II)	1–5	Jagodina (II)	Stadion FK Sinđelić, Belgrade
16:00	Milenković 75'		6', 81' Milošković; 17' Tomić; 45' Milovanović; 70' N. Milošević	Attendance: 200; Referee: Ljubiša Borisavljević

21 September 2016	Polet Ljubić (III)	0–1	Radnik Surdulica	Stadion FK Polet, Ljubić
16:00			45+1' Mišan	Attendance: 600; Referee: Novica Anđelovski

21 September 2016	Zemun (II)	0–0 (4–5 p)	Borac Čačak	Zemun Stadium, Belgrade
16:00				Attendance: 400; Referee: Nemanja Gajdobranski
	Penalties
	Cakić (penalty scored); Stanojević (penalty scored); Injac (penalty scored); Bangura (penalty missed); Lukić (penalty scored)		(penalty scored) Marčić; (penalty scored) Mihajlović; (penalty scored) Thiago Galvão; (penalty scored) Tanasin; (penalty scored) Bogdanović

21 September 2016	Proleter Novi Sad (II)	0–1	Javor Ivanjica	Stadion Slana Bara, Novi Sad
16:00			64' Sević	Attendance: 400; Referee: Marko Popović

21 September 2016	BSK Borča (II)	1–0	Radnički Niš	Vizelj Park, Belgrade
16:00	Cvetković 80'		(yellow card) 75' (yellow-red card) Stanković	Attendance: 800; Referee: Petar Piper

21 September 2016	ČSK Čelarevo (II)	0–3	Red Star Belgrade	Stadion Pivare, Čelarevo
16:00			32' Poletanović; 72' Al. Luković; 83' Sikimić; (penalty missed) 40' Al. Luković	Attendance: 3000; Referee: Aleksandar Vasić

21 September 2016	Partizan	3–1	Napredak Kruševac	Stadion Partizana, Belgrade
18:00	Đurđević 19', 36'; Leonardo 26'		56' Vukanović; (yellow card) 71' (yellow-red card) Sekidika	Attendance: 1500; Referee: Ilija Brdar

21 September 2016	Sloboda Užice (II)	6–1	OFK Beograd (II)	Gradski stadion, Užice
19:00	Đerić 54' (pen.), 90+1'; Nešović 64', 67', 69', 77'		41' Denković	Attendance: 1000; Referee: Aleksandar Živković

21 September 2016	Vojvodina	4–0	Bežanija (II)	Stadion Karađorđe, Novi Sad
20:00	Jovančić 6'; Trujić 8'; Planić 62'; Zličić 73'			Attendance: 1500; Referee: Ana Minić

== Round of 16 ==
The 16 winners from first round took part in this stage of the competition. The draw was held on 14 October 2016, and contained seeded and unseeded teams. Drawing of the lots was conducted by the former national team player Mitar Mrkela. The seeds were determined by last season's final standings in the Serbian top divisions. Seeded teams: Red Star Belgrade, Partizan, Čukarički, Vojvodina, Borac Čačak, Voždovac, Radnik Surdulica and Mladost Lučani. Unseeded teams: Spartak Subotica, Rad, Javor Ivanjica, Novi Pazar, Jagodina (II), BSK Borča (II), Sloboda Užice (II) and Žarkovo (III). Žarkovo, having played in the league level below the Serbian First League in the previous season, was automatically named as host. The matches were played on 25 and 26 October 2016. No extra time was played if the score was tied after the regular 90 minutes. Those games went straight to penalties. In total, around 8,700 spectators attended the games (avg. 1,087 per game).

25 October 2016	Žarkovo (III)	0–2	Partizan	Stadion Kralj Petar I, Belgrade
13:00			48', 71' Bojinov	Attendance: 1000; Referee: Dragan Čolović

26 October 2016	Jagodina (II)	1–1 (4–5 p)	Borac Čačak	Gradski stadion, Jagodina
13:00	Lazović 25'		50' Thiago Galvão	Attendance: 500; Referee: Nemanja Gajdobranski
	Penalties
	I. Ivanović (penalty scored); Miladinović (penalty missed); M. Ristić (penalty scored); Mirkailo (penalty scored); Jelić (penalty scored)		(penalty scored) Kočović; (penalty scored) Delić; (penalty scored) Thiago Galvão; (penalty scored) Krstić; (penalty scored) Bogdanović

26 October 2016	Voždovac	1–0	Spartak Subotica	SC Stadion, Belgrade
14:00	Stojanović 19'; Pavlović (yellow card) 70' (yellow-red card)			Attendance: 400; Referee: Milan Ilić

26 October 2016	Čukarički	1–0	Javor Ivanjica	Stadion Čukarički, Belgrade
15:00	Ožegović 19'; Regan (yellow card) 72' (yellow-red card)			Attendance: 800; Referee: Milorad Mažić

26 October 2016	Red Star Belgrade	3–0	BSK Borča (II)	Stadion Rajko Mitić, Belgrade
16:00	Srnić 68'; Hugo Vieira 70'; Orlandić 88' (pen.)			Attendance: 3200; Referee: Marko Popović

26 October 2016	Mladost Lučani	1–1 (5–3 p)	Rad	Stadion FK Mladost, Lučani
17:00	S. Jovanović 64'		80' Ćulum	Attendance: 1000; Referee: Aleksandar Vasić
	Penalties
	Bojović (penalty scored); Pejović (penalty scored); Milosavljević (penalty scored); Radivojević (penalty scored); Gavrić (penalty scored)		(penalty scored) Stanojević; (penalty scored) Đenić; (penalty missed) Mladenović; (penalty scored) Marković

26 October 2016	Novi Pazar	0–0 (2–3 p)	Vojvodina	Gradski stadion, Novi Pazar
17:00				Attendance: 1000; Referee: Dejan Santrač
	Penalties
	Mutavdžić (penalty missed); Micevski (penalty scored); Vusljanin (penalty scored); Marić (penalty missed); Alivodić (penalty missed)		(penalty missed) Meleg; (penalty scored) Paločević; (penalty scored) Jovančić; (penalty scored) Babić

26 October 2016	Radnik Surdulica	1–2	Sloboda Užice (II)	Gradski stadion, Surdulica
17:00	Kyeremeh 75'; Mladenović (yellow card) 63' (yellow-red card)		64' Nnamani; 86' Vidić	Attendance: 800; Referee: Momčilo Marković

== Quarter-finals ==
The 8 winners from the second round took part in this stage of the competition. The draw was held on 23 November 2016 and contained seeded and unseeded teams. Drawing of the lots was conducted by the current head coach of U21 national team, Tomislav Sivić. The seeds were determined by the following key: Last season's cup semifinalists were automatically set as seeded teams, while the remaining seeds were determined by last season's final standings in top Serbian divisions. Seeded teams: Partizan, Borac Čačak, Red Star Belgrade and Čukarički. Unseeded teams: Vojvodina, Voždovac, Mladost Lučani and Sloboda Užice (II). The matches were played on 5 April 2017. In total, around 5200 spectators attended the games (avg. 1300 per game).

5 April 2017	Voždovac	1–2	Partizan	SC Stadion, Belgrade
13:00	Srećković 42'		80' Đurđević; 90' Leonardo	Attendance: 1000; Referee: Dragan Čolović

5 April 2017	Vojvodina	5–2	Borac Čačak	Stadion Karađorđe, Novi Sad
18:00	Malbašić 12', 71'; Trujić 16', 81'; S. Babić 66'		41' (o.g.) Kovačević; 62' Marčić	Attendance: 700; Referee: Danilo Grujić

5 April 2017	Sloboda Užice (II)	0–3	Čukarički	Gradski stadion, Užice
18:00			21' S. Jovanović; 45' Kajević; 88' Milojević	Attendance: 1500; Referee: Bojan Nikolić

5 April 2017	Red Star Belgrade	4–2	Mladost Lučani	Stadion Rajko Mitić, Belgrade
19:00	Kanga 46'; Milić 52'; Boakye 58'; Al. Luković 63' (pen.)		45' Milosavljević; 70' (pen.) Bojović; (yellow card) 53' (yellow-red card) Andrić	Attendance: 2000; Referee: Novak Simović

== Semi-finals ==
The 4 winners from the Quarter finals (Partizan, Red Star Belgrade, Čukarički and Vojvodina) took part in the semi-finals. The draw was held on 11 April 2017, and there were no seedings in the draw. The drawing of the lots was conducted by the former national team player Goran Bunjevčević. Semi-finals were contested over two legs. First legs were played on 26 April 2017, and second legs were played on 9 and 10 May 2017. In total, around 35400 spectators attended the games (avg. 8850 per game).

Team 1	Agg.	Team 2	1st leg	2nd leg
Čukarički	3–5	Red Star Belgrade	1–4	2–1
Vojvodina	0–1	Partizan	0–0	0–1

=== First legs ===
26 April 2017 SF	Čukarički	1–4	Red Star Belgrade	Stadion Čukarički, Belgrade
16:30	S. Jovanović 40'		12' Le Tallec; 19', 39' Boakye; 33' (o.g.) Ožegović	Attendance: 1500; Referee: Milorad Mažić

26 April 2017 SF	Vojvodina	0–0	Partizan	Stadion Karađorđe, Novi Sad
19:00				Attendance: 7000; Referee: Danilo Grujić

=== Second legs ===
9 May 2017 SF	Red Star Belgrade	1–2 (5–3 agg.)	Čukarički	Stadion Rajko Mitić, Belgrade
16:00	Boakye 76' (pen.)		4' Ožegović; 54' (o.g.) Milić	Attendance: 4600; Referee: Marko Popović

10 May 2017 SF	Partizan	1–0 (1–0 agg.)	Vojvodina	Stadion Partizana, Belgrade
18:00	Đurđević 44'			Attendance: 22256; Referee: Milorad Mažić

== Final ==
Winners from the Semi-finals took part in the single-legged final. The match was played on 27 May 2017. Host of the game, and the venue of the finals were decided by drawing of the lots. The draw was conducted, once again, by the former national team player Goran Bunjevčević.

27 May 2017	Partizan	1–0	Red Star Belgrade	Stadion Partizana, Belgrade
18:00	Milenković 42'			Attendance: 20000; Referee: Milorad Mažić
