= Stefan Milošević (footballer, born April 1995) =

Serbian footballer

Personal information
- Full name: Stefan Milošević
- Date of birth: 7 April 1995 (age 31)
- Place of birth: Požarevac, FR Yugoslavia
- Height: 1.70 m (5 ft 7 in)
- Position: Left-back

Team information
- Current team: Napredak Kruševac
- Number: 11

Youth career
- Rudar Kostolac
- 2006–2010: Red Star Belgrade
- 2010–2013: Partizan

Senior career*
Years	Team	Apps	(Gls)
2013–2016	Spartak Subotica	71	(5)
2016–2018	Red Star Belgrade	2	(0)
2018–2022	Spartak Subotica	104	(5)
2023–2026	Javor Ivanjica	92	(2)
2026–	Napredak Kruševac	0	(0)

International career
2011–2012	Serbia U17	5	(0)
2013	Serbia U19	3	(0)
2015	Serbia U20	5	(0)
Medal record
Gold medal – first place	FIFA U-20 World Cup	2015
- * Club domestic league appearances and goals as of 13 June 2026

Stefan Milošević (Serbian Cyrillic: Стефан Милошевић; born 7 April 1995) is a Serbian professional footballer who plays as a left-back for Napredak Kruševac.

== Club career ==
=== Early years ===
Born in Požarevac, Milošević grew up in Kostolac, where he has started playing football with local club Rudar. Later, when he was 11, Milošević joined Red Star Belgrade, and after 4 years moved in Partizan, where he completed his youth career.

=== Spartak Subotica ===
Milošević joined Spartak Subotica for the 2013–14 season. He made his senior debut in first fixture of the Serbian SuperLiga, played on 10 August 2013. During the season, Milošević made 15 league appearances with 14 starts and 2 semi-final cup matches against Vojvodina. Milošević also spent the 2014–15 season as the first choice on the left-back position, making 26 league and 1 cup appearance. After winning 2015 FIFA U-20 World Cup, Milošević changed his jersey number and took 11 at the beginning of 2015–16 season. Coach Stevan Mojsilović moved Milošević on wing position, more offensive, but later after Nebojša Mezei injured, Milošević returned in defense. Milošević scored 1 goal for the first half-season under Mojsilović, and later, in the spring half-season, he scored 4 more goals under coach Andrey Chernyshov. For the 2015–16 season, Milošević made 30 league and 4 cup appearances, scoring 5 goals and 2 assists. After the end of season, and one year before the end of contract with Spartak Subotica, he made deal with Red Star Belgrade.

=== Red Star Belgrade ===
Stefan Milošević signed a four-year contract with new club on 3 May 2016, and he was given number 21 jersey. He noted his first official cap for new team in the Serbian Cup match against BSK Borča, played on 26 October 2016. He missed the whole period until 5 April 2017, when he also played in a cup match against Mladost Lučani. Several days later, he made his league debut for the club in 29 fixture match of the 2016–17 season, against Rad, replacing Nemanja Milić at the beginning of second-half. Milošević started his first match on the field for Red Star Belgrade in last fixture match of the regular season, against Borac Čačak. After summer pre-season, Milošević stayed out of the first squad for the 2017–18 campaign, and spent the rest of 2017 without competitive matches. On 8 February, it was officially announced both sides mutually terminated the contract and Milošević left the club as a free agent.

=== Return to Spartak Subotica ===
In the winter-break of the 2017–18 Serbian SuperLiga campaign, Milošević moved back to Spartak Subotica. He officially promoted on 24 February 2018, penning a two-and-a-half-year deal with the club. He made his first appearance in the 2017–18 Serbian SuperLiga season in 4–3 away defeat against Napredak Kruševac.

== Career statistics ==
As of end of 2021–22 season

Appearances and goals by club, season and competition
Club	Season	League			Cup		Continental		Other		Total	
Club	Season	Division	Apps	Goals	Apps	Goals	Apps	Goals	Apps	Goals	Apps	Goals
Spartak Subotica	2013–14	Serbian SuperLiga	15	0	2	0	—		—		17	0
Spartak Subotica	2014–15	Serbian SuperLiga	26	0	1	0	—		—		27	0
Spartak Subotica	2015–16	Serbian SuperLiga	30	5	4	0	—		—		34	5
Spartak Subotica	Total		71	5	7	0	—		—		78	5
Red Star Belgrade	2016–17	Serbian SuperLiga	2	0	2	0	0	0	—		4	0
Red Star Belgrade	2017–18	Serbian SuperLiga	0	0	0	0	0	0	—		0	0
Red Star Belgrade	Total		2	0	2	0	0	0	—		4	0
Spartak Subotica	2017–18	Serbian SuperLiga	3	0	—		—		—		3	0
Spartak Subotica	2018–19	Serbian SuperLiga	33	2	2	0	4	0	—		39	2
Spartak Subotica	2019–20	Serbian SuperLiga	24	0	0	0	0	0	—		24	0
Spartak Subotica	2020–21	Serbian SuperLiga	21	2	2	0	0	0	—		23	2
Spartak Subotica	2021–22	Serbian SuperLiga	23	1	0	0	0	0	—		23	1
Spartak Subotica	Total		104	5	4	0	4	0	—		112	5
Career total			177	10	13	0	4	0	—		194	10

== Honours ==
Serbia

- FIFA U-20 World Cup: 2015
