= Jovan Vićić =

Serbian footballer

Personal information
- Full name: Jovan Vićić
- Date of birth: 23 February 1997 (age 29)
- Place of birth: Loznica, FR Yugoslavia
- Height: 1.90 m (6 ft 3 in)
- Position: Goalkeeper

Youth career
- Loznica
- Red Star Belgrade

Senior career*
Years	Team	Apps	(Gls)
2015–2018	Red Star Belgrade	0	(0)
2015	→ GSP Polet (loan)	11	(0)
2016	→ Loznica (loan)	6	(0)
2016	→ Kolubara (loan)	6	(0)
2017	→ Bežanija (loan)	5	(0)
2017–2018	→ Drina Zvornik (loan)	20	(0)
2018–2019	Mačva Šabac	0	(0)

International career^{‡}
2012–2013	Serbia U16		
2013–2014	Serbia U17		
2014–2015	Serbia U18	4	(0)
2015–2016	Serbia U19	3	(0)
- * Club domestic league appearances and goals as of 16 March 2019 ‡ National team caps and goals as of 23 November 2016

Jovan Vićić (Serbian Cyrillic: Јован Вићић; born 23 February 1997) is a Serbian ex-footballer, who played as a goalkeeper. Currently, he is working as a football agent.

== Club career ==
=== Red Star Belgrade ===
Born in Loznica, Vićić passed the youth school of Red Star Belgrade and joined the first team in summer 2015. Later he was loaned to GSP Polet on dual registration, where he made 11 appearances in the Serbian League Belgrade for the first half of 2015–16 season. At the beginning of 2016, Vićić signed his first professional contract with Red Star and moved on loan to Serbian First League Loznica. In summer 2016, Vićić spent pre-season training with Red Star, and later he moved on new loan to Kolubara at one-year dual-registration. After he spent the winter break off-season with home club, a loan deal with Kolubara was terminated and he moved to Bežanija until the end of the same season. In summer 2017, Vićić moved on loan to Drina Zvornik. In summer 2018, Vićić released by the club.

=== Mačva Šabac ===
On 29 June 2018, it was announced Vićić joined Mačva Šabac as the first summer signing.

== International career ==
Vićić was a member of Serbia U16, Serbia U17 and Serbia U18 national team levels between 2012 and 2015. In February 2016, he became the first footballer in the history of FK Loznica, which invited into national team selection, after he was called by coach Branislav Nikolić for a friendly match of Serbia national under-19 football team against Bulgaria. As a new coach of Serbia U20 national level, Ilija Petković called Vićić into the squad in March 2017.

== Career statistics ==
=== Club ===
As of 1 July 2018

Appearances and goals by club, season and competition
Club	Season	League			Cup		Continental		Other		Total	
Club	Season	Division	Apps	Goals	Apps	Goals	Apps	Goals	Apps	Goals	Apps	Goals
Red Star Belgrade	2015–16	SuperLiga	0	0	0	0	0	0	—		0	0
Red Star Belgrade	2016–17	SuperLiga	0	0	0	0	0	0	—		0	0
Red Star Belgrade	2017–18	SuperLiga	—		—		0	0	—		0	0
Red Star Belgrade	Total		0	0	0	0	0	0	—		0	0
GSP Polet (loan)	2015–16	League Belgrade	11	0	—		—		—		11	0
Loznica (loan)	2015–16	First League	6	0	—		—		—		6	0
Kolubara (loan)	2016–17	First League	6	0	1	0	—		—		7	0
Bežanija (loan)	2016–17	First League	5	0	—		—		—		5	0
Drina Zvornik (loan)	2017–18	First League RS	20	0	0	0	—		—		20	0
Mačva Šabac	2018–19	SuperLiga	0	0	0	0	—		—		0	0
Career total			48	0	1	0	0	0	—		49	0
