= Mateus Viveiros =

Brazilian footballer

Personal information
- Full name: Mateus Viveiros Andrade
- Date of birth: 17 January 1998 (age 28)
- Place of birth: Brasília, Brazil
- Height: 1.72 m (5 ft 8 in)
- Position: Right-back

Team information
- Current team: Luverdense
- Number: 5

Youth career
- 2012–2016: São Paulo
- 2017: Red Star Belgrade

Senior career*
Years	Team	Apps	(Gls)
2017–2018	Red Star Belgrade	0	(0)
2017–2019	→ Bežanija (loan)	7	(0)
2019–	Luverdense		
2020	Jataí-GO		

International career^{‡}
2014–2015	Brazil U17		
- * Club domestic league appearances and goals as of 10 September 2018 ‡ National team caps and goals as of 10 September 2018

Mateus Viveiros Andrade (born 17 January 1998) is a Brazilian footballer who plays as a right-back.

== Club career ==
Born in Brasília, Viveiros started playing futsal when he was 6. When he was 11 he started playing football at São Paulo from Brasília, but shortly after he moved to a more prestigious Brasília Football Academy. It was playing in the academy that he earned a chance for trials at São Paulo FC and was successful at first. In 2013 he became Brazilian U15 champion with São Paulo. With youth teams of São Paulo he also won the Copa Ouro in 2016 and became Campeonato Paulista champion in U17 and U20 levels.

On 13 February 2017, Viveiros signed a two-and-a-half-year contract with Serbian club Red Star Belgrade. After spending half a year training with senior squad and playing with youth team of Red Star, in summer 2017 he was loaned to FK Bežanija. He made 7 appearances with Bežanija in the 2017–18 Serbian First League.

== International career ==
In January 2014 Viveiros was called to the Brazilian U17 national team, having been called since then regularly such was in March, or May 2015.

In June 2016 he was called for the Brazilian U19 national team. Later that same month he was called to the Brazilian U20 national team.
