= Stefan Ilić =

Serbian footballer

Personal information
- Full name: Stefan Ilić
- Date of birth: 7 April 1995 (age 31)
- Place of birth: Kragujevac, FR Yugoslavia
- Height: 1.85 m (6 ft 1 in)
- Position: Forward

Team information
- Current team: Sloboda Grbice

Youth career
- Red Star Belgrade
- Partizan

Senior career*
Years	Team	Apps	(Gls)
2014–2016	Spartak Subotica	58	(7)
2016–2017	Red Star Belgrade	1	(0)
2017	→ Radnički Niš (loan)	0	(0)
2017–2018	Bežanija	6	(0)
2018–2019	Metalac Gornji Milanovac	42	(12)
2019–2021	Bačka Palanka	24	(3)
2021	Mohammedan Sporting		
2022-2023	Zastava 1973		
2023-	Sloboda Grbice		

International career
2013	Serbia U19	3	(1)
2015	Serbia U20	5	(3)
Medal record
Gold medal – first place	FIFA U-20 World Cup	2015
- * Club domestic league appearances and goals

Stefan Ilić (Serbian Cyrillic: Стефан Илић; born 7 April 1995) is a Serbian professional footballer who plays as a forward for Sloboda Grbice.

== Club career ==
He represented the Serbia U-20 team, that took part in the Youth World Cup 2015. Serbia finished as the champion of the Championship that season. He also played for the heavyweight Serbian Club Red Star Belgrade. In the 2020–21 season, he joined and appeared with Serbian first division club OFK Bačka.

In June 2021, he moved to India and signed with I-League side Mohammedan Sporting for their 2021–22 season. He was part of the team's 2021 Durand Cup campaign, in which he appeared in all the matches, and reached to the final, defeating FC Bengaluru United 4–2. On 3 October 2021, they lost the title winning match 1–0 to ISL side FC Goa.

Ilić also appeared in the 2021 CFL Premier Division league, in which Mohammedan reached to the final, defeating United SC 1–0.

== International career ==
Ilić represented Serbia U20 national team at the 2015 FIFA U-20 World Cup, where the clinched the title, winning gold medal.

== Honours ==
=== International ===
Serbia U20

- FIFA U-20 World Cup: 2015

=== Club ===
Mohammedan Sporting

- Durand Cup runner-up: 2021
