= Saša Jovanović (footballer, born 1993) =

Serbian footballer

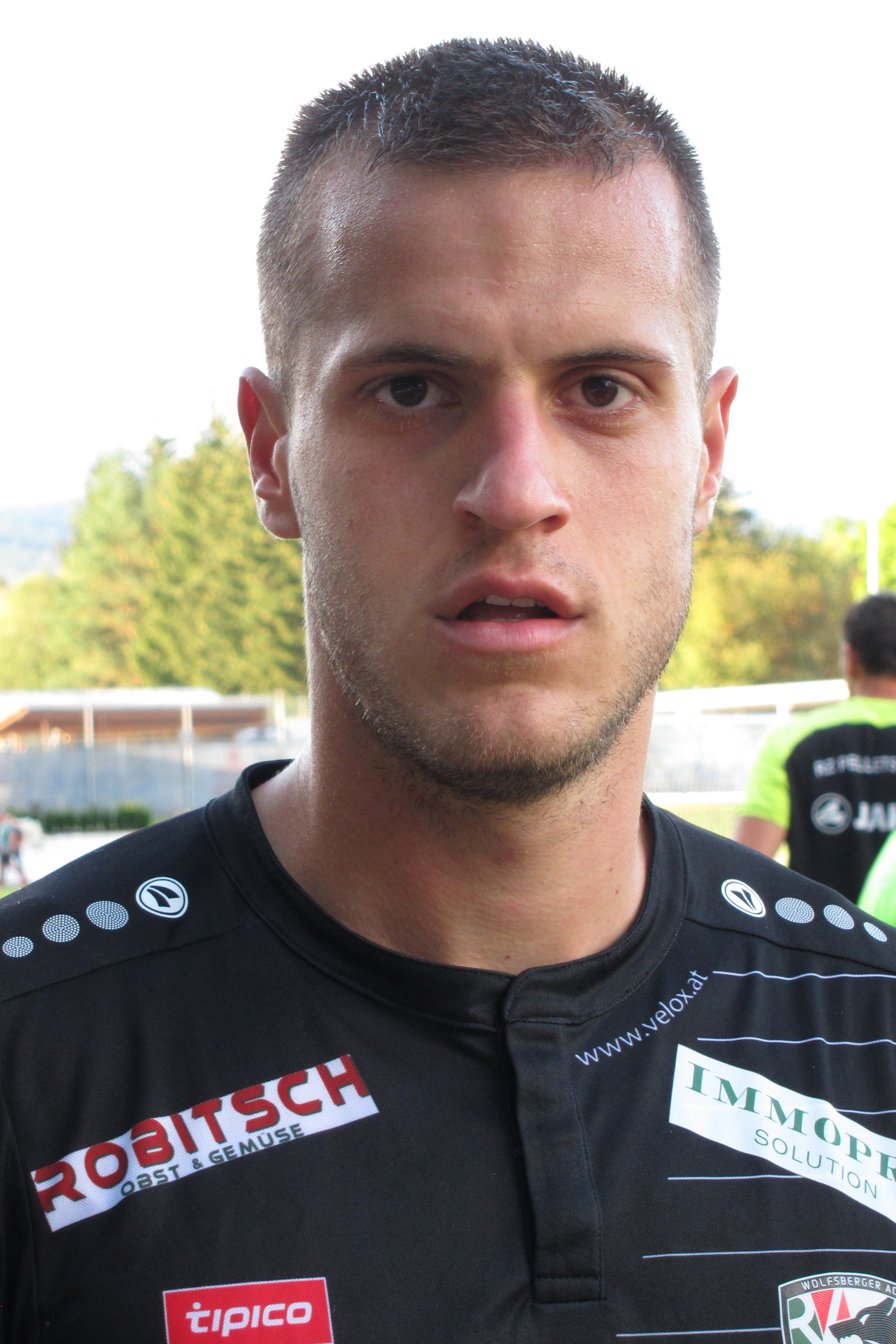

Personal information
- Full name: Saša Jovanović
- Date of birth: 30 August 1993 (age 33)
- Place of birth: Belgrade, FR Yugoslavia
- Height: 1.84 m (6 ft 1/2 in)
- Position: Left winger

Team information
- Current team: Rad

Youth career
- Partizan

Senior career*
| Years | Team | Apps | (Gls) |
| 2010–2011 | Teleoptik | 3 | (0) |
| 2011–2013 | Rad | 17 | (1) |
| 2011–2012 | → Palić (loan) | 16 | (2) |
| 2012 | → BASK (loan) | 11 | (1) |
| 2014 | Voždovac | 3 | (0) |
| 2014 | OFK Beograd | 0 | (0) |
| 2015 | Bežanija | 15 | (6) |
| 2015–2017 | Čukarički | 62 | (4) |
| 2018–2019 | Wolfsberger AC | 29 | (1) |
| 2019 | Inđija | 7 | (0) |
| 2020–2021 | Rad | 44 | (3) |
| 2021–2022 | Radnički Kragujevac | 21 | (2) |
| 2022–2023 | Radnički Niš | 24 | (1) |
| 2023 | Novi Pazar | 4 | (1) |
| 2024 | Smederevo | 15 | (1) |
| 2025– | Rad | 9 | (2) |

International career
| 2009–2010 | Serbia U17 | 1 | (0) |
- * Club domestic league appearances and goals as of 15 July 2026

Saša Jovanović (Serbian Cyrillic: Саша Јовановић; born 30 August 1993) is a Serbian professional footballer who plays as a left winger for Rad.
