= Draško Đorđević =

Serbian footballer

Personal information
- Full name: Draško Đorđević
- Date of birth: 1 August 1993 (age 33)
- Place of birth: Belgrade, FR Yugoslavia
- Height: 1.84 m (6 ft 0 in)
- Position: Centre back

Team information
- Current team: Sinđelić Beograd

Youth career
- Obilić
- Red Star Belgrade
- Palilulac Beograd

Senior career*
Years	Team	Apps	(Gls)
2011–2013	Radnički Beograd		
2014–2015	BASK	21	(1)
2015–2016	Donji Srem	21	(0)
2016	Bežanija	14	(0)
2017–2018	Red Star Belgrade	0	(0)
2017	→ OFK Beograd (loan)	7	(1)
2017–2018	→ Bežanija (loan)	20	(1)
2018–2019	Al-Mujazzal		
2019	Spartak Subotica	10	(0)
2019	Sinđelić Beograd	21	(3)
2020–2021	Rabotnički	37	(1)
2021	Rad	7	(0)
2022	Rabotnički	13	(0)
2022	Radnički Beograd	5	(0)
2023-	Sinđelić Beograd		
- * Club domestic league appearances and goals as of 25 February 2023

Draško Đorđević (Serbian Cyrillic: Драшко Ђорђевић; born 1 August 1993) is a Serbian footballer who plays as a centre back.

== Club career ==
Born in Belgrade, Đorđević started his career with Obilić, where he made his first football steps. Later he moved to Red Star Belgrade, passing the greatest part of his youth categories with the club. He made his first senior appearance playing with Palilulac Beograd at the age of 17. He stayed with the club until the end of 2012. Later he spent the whole 2013 with Radnički Beograd and moved to BASK at the beginning of 2014. Playing with BASK, Đorđević noted 21 Serbian League Belgrade appearance, scoring 1 goal between 2014 and 2015. At the beginning of 2015–16 season, Đorđević moved to Serbian First League side Donji Srem. He became starting player shortly after and collected 23 matches at total until the end of season, mostly playing as a centre-back or left-back. In summer 2016, Đorđević signed one-year contract with Bežanija.

At the beginning of 2017, Đorđević moved on trial to Red Star Belgrade. After he spent the winter break off-season with the first team, playing some friendly matches, Đorđević signed a two-and-a-half-year deal with the club, being loaned to the Serbian First League side OFK Beograd until the end of 2016–17 campaign. At the beginning of May 2017, Đorđević suffered a leg fracture after Miodrag Gemović's bad tackle during the game against Mačva Šabac. In summer 2017, Đorđević returned to Bežanija at one-year loan deal.

== Career statistics ==
As of 7 June 2018

Appearances and goals by club, season and competition
Club	Season	League			Cup		Continental		Other		Total	
Club	Season	Division	Apps	Goals	Apps	Goals	Apps	Goals	Apps	Goals	Apps	Goals
BASK	2013–14	Serbian League Belgrade	11	1	—		—		—		11	1
BASK	2014–15	Serbian League Belgrade	10	0	—		—		—		10	0
BASK	Total		21	1	—		—		—		21	1
Donji Srem	2015–16	Serbian First League	21	0	2	0	—		—		23	0
OFK Beograd (loan)	2016–17	Serbian First League	7	1	—		—		—		7	1
Bežanija	2016–17	Serbian First League	14	0	1	0	—		—		15	0
Bežanija (loan)	2017–18	Serbian First League	20	1	0	0	—		—		20	1
Bežanija (loan)	Total		34	1	1	0	—		—		35	1
Career total			83	2	3	0	—		—		86	2
