= Viktor Kelm =

Kyrgyzstani footballer (born 1997)

Personal information
- Full name: Viktor Olegovich Kelm
- Date of birth: 2 January 1997 (age 29)
- Place of birth: Bishkek, Kyrgyzstan
- Position: Forward

Team information
- Current team: FC Alay

Youth career
- 2013–2015: Abdysh-Ata Kant
- 2015: Kairat Almaty

Senior career*
Years	Team	Apps	(Gls)
2014–2015	Abdysh-Ata Kant		
2015	Kairat Almaty	0	(0)
2016	Kara-Balta	2	(0)
2016	Bežanija	2	(0)
2017–	Alay Osh		

International career^{‡}
2013–2014	Kyrgyzstan U17	2	(1)
- Kyrgyzstan U19
- Kyrgyzstan U21
2016–	Kyrgyzstan	1	(0)
- * Club domestic league appearances and goals as of 11 November 2016 ‡ National team caps and goals as of 11 November 2016

Viktor Olegovich Kelm (Russian: Виктор Олегович Кельм; born 2 January 1997) is a Kyrgyz football who plays as a forward for FC Alay.

== Club career ==
Born in Kyrgyz capital Bishkek, he played with FC Abdysh-Ata Kant in 2013, and then he was part of the team that finished second in the 2014 Kyrgyzstan League. After playing in January 2015 with Abdysh-Ata main team in the winter Kyrgyzstan League, as well as with team's U-21 side at a tournament in Kazakhstan, he subsequently stayed in the country and, in February 2015, he signed with Kazakhstan Premier League side FC Kairat. He spent much time while at Almaty playing with Kairat youth team.

Kelm played with Kyrgyz FC Kara-Balta in 2016. During summer 2016 he joined Serbian side FK Bežanija.

After his spell in Serbia, Kelm returned to Kyrgyzstan and joined FC Alay.

== International career ==
Kelm was a member of the Kyrgyzstan U-17 team at tournaments during 2013 and 2014.

In 2014 as in 2015 Kelm had been member of Kyrgyzstan U-21 team.

In March 2015, he was called to Kyrgyzstan senior national team by coach Aleksandr Krestinin for the friendly-game against Afghanistan.

He debuted for Kyrgyzstan in a friendly game against Turkmenistan played on 11 October 2016.

In 2016, being only 19, he had a full year regarding national teams; he had represented in same year Kyrgyz U-19, U-21, and debuted for the Kyrgyzstan A national team. He was then called up for the friendly matches on 6 and 11 October against Lebanon and Turkmenistan.
