= Milan Panović =

Serbian footballer

Personal information
- Full name: Milan Panović
- Date of birth: 27 February 1998 (age 28)
- Place of birth: Belgrade, Serbia
- Height: 1.77 m (5 ft 9 1/2 in)
- Position: Centre forward

Youth career
- Red Star Belgrade

Senior career*
Years	Team	Apps	(Gls)
2017	Red Star Belgrade	0	(0)
2017	→ Bežanija (loan)	5	(1)
2017	Radnički Beograd	0	(0)
2018–2019	IMT		
2019–2020	Grafičar Beograd	10	(0)
2020	Sinđelić Beograd	0	(0)
2021	Lokomotiva Beograd		
2021	FK 1 Maj Ruma		
2022	Feniks		
2022-2023	Stepojevac		
2023	Prva Iskra Barič		
2023	Borac Šajkaš		

International career
2013–2014	Serbia U16		
2015	Serbia U17	3	(1)
- * Club domestic league appearances and goals as of 15:29, 25 February 2020 (UTC)

Milan Panović (Serbian Cyrillic: Милан Пановић; born 27 February 1998) is a Serbian football forward.

== Club career ==
=== Red Star Belgrade ===
As one of the youth academy players, Panović signed his first professional contract with Red Star Belgrade in February 2014. He was a member of the team which won the Serbian cadet league for the 2013–14 season. Playing for the youth team, Panović was labeled as a Luka Jović's successor in the first team. At the beginning of 2017, Panović was loaned to Bežanija on dual registration until the end of 2016–17 Serbian First League season. Panović scored his first senior goal on his debut match for Bežanija against Proleter Novi Sad, played on 12 March 2017. In summer 2017, Panović moved to Radnički Beograd as a single player.

== International career ==
Panović was called into the selection of players born 1998 under Football Association of Belgrade in 2012 for the international tournament "Belgrade Trophy". After he was a Serbia national under-16 football team member, Panović was called to U17 level by coach Dejan Govedarica in 2015. Later, same year, he had also been called into U18 selection squad, until he broke leg in November 2015.

== Career statistics ==
As of 5 June 2017

Club	Season	League			Cup		Continental		Other		Total	
Club	Season	Division	Apps	Goals	Apps	Goals	Apps	Goals	Apps	Goals	Apps	Goals
Red Star Belgrade	2016–17	Serbian SuperLiga	0	0	0	0	—		—		0	0
Bežanija (loan)	2016–17	Serbian First League	5	1	—		—		—		5	1
Radnički Beograd	2017–18	Serbian League Belgrade	0	0	—		—		—		0	0
Career total			5	1	0	0	—		—		5	1
