= Filip Manojlović =

Serbian footballer (born 1996)

Personal information
- Date of birth: 25 April 1996 (age 30)
- Place of birth: Belgrade, FR Yugoslavia
- Height: 1.97 m (6 ft 6 in)
- Position: Goalkeeper

Team information
- Current team: Start on loan from Djurgårdens IF
- Number: 45

Youth career
- Radnički Beograd
- 2005–2014: Red Star Belgrade

Senior career*
Years	Team	Apps	(Gls)
2014–2017	Red Star Belgrade	25	(0)
2014–2015	→ Sopot (loan)	22	(0)
2015–2016	→ Bežanija (loan)	28	(0)
2016	→ OFK Bačka (loan)	7	(0)
2017–2020	Getafe	0	(0)
2018–2019	→ Panionios (loan)	8	(0)
2020–2021	SS Reyes	3	(0)
2021–2024	Spartak Subotica	37	(0)
2024–2025	Borac Banja Luka	18	(0)
2025–	Djurgårdens IF	24	(0)
2026–	→ Start (loan)	1	(0)

International career^{‡}
2015	Serbia U19	2	(0)
2015	Serbia U20	1	(0)
2015–2019	Serbia U21	3	(0)
2015	Serbia U23	1	(0)
2017	Serbia	1	(0)
Medal record
Gold medal – first place	FIFA U-20 World Cup	2015
- * Club domestic league appearances and goals as of 22 August 2026 ‡ National team caps and goals as of 23 June 2017

Filip Manojlović (Serbian Cyrillic: Филип Манојловић, pronounced [fǐlip manǒːjloʋitɕ]; born 25 April 1996) is a Serbian professional footballer who plays as a goalkeeper for Eliteserien club Start on loan from Allsvenskan club Djurgårdens IF.

== Club career ==
=== Red Star Belgrade ===
==== Early years & loan spells ====
Born in Belgrade, Manojlović started playing football with Radnički Beograd and later moved to Red Star Belgrade, where he passed all youth categories. He was loaned to Sopot for the 2014–15 season. After he made 22 Serbian League Belgrade appearances as a bonus player, and was nominated for the man of the match at two times, Manojlović moved on new loan to Bežanija, where he spent the 2015–16 season on dual registration. He was also loaned to OFK Bačka, where he made 7 SuperLiga caps for the first half of 2016–17 season.

==== First team breakthrough ====
Manojlović signed his first three-year professional contract with club in February 2014. Joining the first team, Manojlović started 2014–15 Serbian SuperLiga season as the 4th choice behind Predrag Rajković, Damir Kahriman and Marko Trkulja. He was also loaned on dual registrations for the next two seasons to get a senior experience, being also licensed with the first team as a back-up option for the Serbian SuperLiga. In summer 2016, Manojlović moved to OFK Bačka at six-month loan, where he made his first appearances in the first tier of the Serbian football pyramid. However, a loan deal had been terminated shortly after and Manojlović returned to Red Star in last days of the summer transfer window. On 14 September 2016, Manojlović extended his contract with club until summer 2020. He made his official debut for Red Star Belgrade in eternal derby, played on 17 September 2016 under coach Miodrag Božović. Manojlović collected 29 appearances in both domestic competitions including league and cup games, missing several matches before the end of a season under Boško Đurovski. Manojlović also started new season as a first choice under new manager, Vladan Milojević. On 29 June 2017, he made his first continental appearance for the club in first leg of the first qualifying round for 2017–18 UEFA Europa League, against Floriana, keeping a clean sheet. Making 4 appearances at the beginning of the season, Manojlović left the club after the match against Irtysh Pavlodar, played on 20 July 2017.

=== Getafe ===
On 21 July 2017, Manojlović signed a four-year contract with Getafe.

==== Panionios ====
On 26 July 2018, Getafe officially announced on Thursday that international goalkeeper Filip Manojlović will join Greek Super League club Panionios, on loan until the end of 2018–19 season.

== International career ==
After he was a member of Serbia U19 national football team in 2015, Manojlović won 2015 FIFA U-20 World Cup. In December 2015, Manojlović appeared for Serbia U23 team in friendly match against Qatar, under coach Milan Rastavac. He debuted for U21 team on 25 March 2016 in a match against Andorra. Coach Slavoljub Muslin invited Manojlović for a friendly match of the Serbia national football team against Qatar in September 2016. He also received a call for a friendly match against United States, on 29 January 2017, when he made a debut for the team.

== Career statistics ==
=== Club ===
As of match played 17 March 2025

Appearances and goals by club, season and competition
Club	Season	League			Cup		Continental		Other		Total	
Club	Season	Division	Apps	Goals	Apps	Goals	Apps	Goals	Apps	Goals	Apps	Goals
Red Star Belgrade	2014–15	Serbian SuperLiga	0	0	0	0	—		—		0	0
Red Star Belgrade	2016–17	Serbian SuperLiga	25	0	4	0	0	0	—		29	0
Red Star Belgrade	2017–18	Serbian SuperLiga	—		—		4	0	—		4	0
Red Star Belgrade	Total		25	0	4	0	4	0	—		33	0
Sopot (loan)	2014–15	Serbian League Belgrade	22	0	—		—		—		22	0
Bežanija (loan)	2015–16	Serbian First League	28	0	2	0	—		—		30	0
OFK Bačka (loan)	2016–17	Serbian SuperLiga	7	0	—		—		—		7	0
Getafe	2017–18	La Liga	0	0	0	0	—		—		0	0
Panionios (loan)	2018–19	Super League Greece	8	0	3	0	—		—		11	0
SS Reyes	2020–21	Segunda División B	3	0	0	0	—		—		3	0
Spartak Subotica	2021–22	Serbian SuperLiga	1	0	1	0	—		—		2	0
Spartak Subotica	2022–23	Serbian SuperLiga	27	0	1	0	—		—		28	0
Spartak Subotica	2023–24	Serbian SuperLiga	9	0	0	0	—		—		9	0
Spartak Subotica	Total		37	0	2	0	—		—		39	0
Borac Banja Luka	2024–25	Premier League BH	18	0	2	0	11	0	—		31	0
Career total			148	0	13	0	15	0	0	0	176	0

=== International ===
As of 30 January 2017

National team	Year	Apps	Goals
Serbia	2017	1	0
Total		1	0

== Honours ==
Red Star Belgrade

- Serbian SuperLiga: 2015–16

Serbia

- FIFA U-20 World Cup: 2015
