= Duško Petković =

Serbian footballer

Personal information
- Date of birth: 24 July 1990 (age 36)
- Place of birth: Suva Reka, SFR Yugoslavia
- Height: 1.65 m (5 ft 5 in)
- Position: Winger

Senior career*
Years	Team	Apps	(Gls)
2008–2011	BPI Slavija		
2011	Columbia Floridsdorf	14	(0)
2012	SV Langenrohr	12	(1)
2012	Šumadija Jagnjilo	13	(2)
2013	Sinđelić Beograd	14	(2)
2013	Šumadija Jagnjilo	13	(2)
2014–2016	Žarkovo	52	(13)
2016–2017	Rad	16	(0)
2017–2019	Žarkovo	19	(3)
2019–2022	Prva Iskra Barič		
- * Club domestic league appearances and goals as of 27 March 2019

Duško Petković (Serbian Cyrillic: Душко Петковић; born 24 July 1990) is a Serbian football midfielder.

== Club career ==
Petković started his career playing with BPI Slavija. Later he spent some period with Columbia Floridsdorf and SV Langenrohr in Austria. Returning in Serbia, Petković joined Šumadija Jagnjilo, where he played in 2012 and 2013, and he was also with Sinđelić Beograd in the meantime. Petković moved to Žarkovo in 2014, where he stayed until 2016. In summer 2016, Petković signed with Serbian SuperLiga side Rad.
