= Andreja Lazović =

Serbian footballer

Personal information
- Date of birth: 4 August 1994 (age 32)
- Place of birth: Belgrade, FR Yugoslavia
- Height: 1.80 m (5 ft 11 in)
- Position: Forward

Team information
- Current team: FK Komgrap

Youth career
- 2008–2011: Čukarički

Senior career*
| Years | Team | Apps | (Gls) |
| 2012–2013 | Čukarički | 4 | (0) |
| 2013 | → BASK (loan) | 13 | (3) |
| 2014 | Sinđelić Beograd | 13 | (2) |
| 2014–2015 | Mačva Šabac | 20 | (2) |
| 2015–2016 | Smederevo | 9 | (2) |
| 2016–2017 | Jagodina | 23 | (1) |
| 2017–2018 | Proleter Vranovo | 10 | (1) |
| 2018 | Gorodeya | 5 | (1) |
| 2019–2020 | OFK Beograd | | |
| 2020 | Bačka Palanka | 2 | (0) |
| 2020–2021 | IMT | 42 | (9) |
| 2022 | OFK Beograd | | |
| 2022–2023 | Zemun | | |
| 2023–2024 | KFK Ravna Gora | | |
| 2024– | FK Komgrap | | |
- * Club domestic league appearances and goals as of 31 December 2021

Andreja Lazović (Serbian Cyrillic: Андреја Лазовић; born 4 August 1994) is a Serbian footballer.
