= Milan Marčić =

Serbian footballer

Personal information
- Full name: Milan Marčić
- Date of birth: 14 March 1996 (age 30)
- Place of birth: Zemun, FR Yugoslavia
- Height: 1.90 m (6 ft 3 in)
- Position: Attacking midfielder

Youth career
- 2012–2013: Zemun
- 2014: Red Star Belgrade
- 2014–2015: Vitória Guimarães

Senior career*
Years	Team	Apps	(Gls)
2012–2013	Zemun	2	(1)
2014	Red Star Belgrade	0	(0)
2014–2015	Vitória Guimarães	0	(0)
2015	Moreirense	0	(0)
2016–2017	Borac Čačak	33	(1)
2017	Covilhã	0	(0)
2017–2018	Javor Ivanjica	23	(0)
2018–2022	Spartak Subotica	97	(15)
2022	Javor Ivanjica	26	(2)
2023	Mladost Lučani	10	(0)
2023	Bunyodkor	7	(1)
2024	Zrinski Osječko 1664	1	(0)
2024–2025	Tekstilac	17	(0)
2025	Shenzhen Juniors	13	(3)
- * Club domestic league appearances and goals as of 22 November 2024

Milan Marčić (Serbian Cyrillic: Милан Марчић; born 14 March 1996) is a Serbian footballer.

== Club career ==
Born in Zemun, Marčić started his career in the club with the same name, where he passed youth selections and joined the first team at the age of 17. Later he was with Red Star Belgrade youth team, before he left to Portugal, where played with Vitória Guimarães and Moreirense. At the beginning of 2016, Marčić joined Borac Čačak and made his SuperLiga debut in last minutes of match against Spartak Subotica, played on 6 March 2016. In summer 2017, Marčić moved to Covilhã.
