= Ignacio Varela =

Argentinefootballer

Personal information
- Full name: Ignacio Lucas Varela
- Date of birth: 20 July 1990 (age 36)
- Place of birth: Buenos Aires, Argentina
- Height: 1.85 m (6 ft 1 in)
- Position: Forward

Team information
- Current team: Castrumfavara

Youth career
- –2010: Ferro Carril Oeste

Senior career*
Years	Team	Apps	(Gls)
2011–2013	Ferro Carril Oeste	5	(0)
2012–2013	→ Colegiales (loan)	27	(3)
2013	Sarmiento	9	(1)
2014	JJ Urquiza	16	(2)
2014	Sacachispas	17	(9)
2015	Llaneros	19	(5)
2015–2016	Derthona	17	(7)
2016	Istra 1961	11	(1)
2016–2019	Floriana	51	(19)
2019	→ Sliema Wanderers (loan)	11	(3)
2019	Gelbison	13	(1)
2019–2020	Vado	10	(4)
2020–2021	Derthona	24	(1)
2021–2022	San Giorgio	37	(5)
2022–2023	Ragusa	25	(2)
2023	Castrovillari	11	(3)
2023–2024	Sancataldese	20	(4)
2024	Isernia	12	(1)
2024–	Castrumfavara	30	(10)
- * Club domestic league appearances and goals as of 18 January 2026

Ignacio Lucas Varela (born 20 July 1990) is an Argentine football player who plays for Italian Serie D club Castrumfavara. He also holds Italian citizenship.

== Club career ==
He made his Primera B Nacional debut for Ferro Carril Oeste on 16 April 2011 in a game against CAI.

In December 2019, Varela joined Serie D club Vado.
