= Milan Senić =

Hungarian-Serbian footballer

Personal information
- Full name: Milan Senić
- Date of birth: 11 July 1997 (age 29)
- Place of birth: Szeged, Hungary
- Height: 1.85 m (6 ft 1 in)
- Position: Winger

Youth career
- Tisza Volán
- –2009: TuS Koblenz
- 2009–2016: Bayer Leverkusen

Senior career*
Years	Team	Apps	(Gls)
2016	Bayer Leverkusen	0	(0)
2016	→ Neustrelitz (loan)	16	(1)
2017–2018	Red Star Belgrade	0	(0)
2017	→ OFK Beograd (loan)	3	(0)
2017	→ Siófok (loan)	8	(0)
2018–2019	Düsseldorf-West	21	(5)
2019–2020	Lokomotive Leipzig	8	(0)
2020–2022	Düsseldorf-West	25	(4)
2022–2024	SG Unterrath	21	(3)

International career
2014–2015	Serbia U18	9	(1)
2015–2016	Serbia U19	13	(3)
- * Club domestic league appearances and goals as of 17:42, 28 December 2023 (UTC)

Milan Senić (Serbian Cyrillic: Милан Сенић; born 11 July 1997) is a Serbian football forward.

Born in Szeged, as a member of a Serbian ethnic group, Senić holds both Hungarian and Serbian citizenship.

== Club career ==
=== Early years ===
Senić started playing football with local football school Tisza Volán. Coming to German side, Senić played with TuS Koblenz before he joined Bayer Leverkusen youth sistem. Passing throw the club academy, Senić also played in the UEFA Youth League in 2014 and 2015. Next he overgrown youth categories, Senić was loaned to TSG Neustrelitz for a half-season in 2016. After he refused to extend the contract with Bayer Leverkusen, Senić left the club as a free agent.

=== Red Star Belgrade ===
On 9 January 2017, Senić signed four-and-a-half-year deal with Red Star Belgrade, when general director of the club, Zvezdan Terzić, compared him with Cristiano Ronaldo. After he spent the winter break off-season with the club, he was loaned to the Serbian First League OFK Beograd on dual registration until the end of season, also playing with Red Star reserves. In summer 2017, Senić moved on loan to Hungarian side BFC Siófok.

== International career ==
After he was a member of Serbia U18 level from 2014 to 2015, Senić was also called into the Serbia national under-19 football team between 2015 and 2016. Playing with the team, Senić made 13 appearances and scored 3 goals in matches against Montenegro, Armenia and Spain.

== Career statistics ==
=== Club ===
As of 17 December 2017

Appearances and goals by club, season and competition
Club	Season	League			Cup		Continental		Other		Total	
Club	Season	Division	Apps	Goals	Apps	Goals	Apps	Goals	Apps	Goals	Apps	Goals
Neustrelitz (loan)	2016–17	Regionalliga Nordost	16	1	—		—		1 (Note: Including an appearance in the Mecklenburg-Vorpommern Cup)	1	17	2
OFK Beograd (loan)	2016–17	First League	3	0	—		—		—		3	0
Siófok (loan)	2017–18	NB II	8	0	—		—		—		8	0
Career total			27	1	0	0	—		1	1	28	2
