= Ersan Rovčanin =

Serbian footballer

Personal information
- Date of birth: 24 March 1993 (age 33)
- Place of birth: Prijepolje, FR Yugoslavia
- Height: 1.80 m (5 ft 11 in)
- Position: Attacking midfielder

Team information
- Current team: Rot-Weiss Frankfurt

Youth career
- 2005–2012: Partizan

Senior career*
Years	Team	Apps	(Gls)
2012–2013	Čapljina	7	(0)
2014	Iskra Bugojno	12	(0)
2014–2015	Jedinstvo Bihać	23	(1)
2015–2016	Metalleghe-BSI	18	(0)
2016–2018	Metalac Gornji Milanovac	68	(9)
2019	TSC	23	(1)
2021-2022	FFV Sportfreunde 04	29	(9)
2022	SV der Bosnier	14	(5)
2023	Spvgg 05 Oberrad	13	(8)
2023-2024	DJK Sportfreunde Bad Homburg	21	(1)
2024-	Rot-Weiss Frankfurt	26	(5)
- * Club domestic league appearances and goals as of 28 May 2025

Ersan Rovčanin (Serbian Cyrillic: Ерсан Ровчанин; born 24 March 1993) is a Serbian footballer who plays as a midfielder.

== Career ==
Born in Prijepolje, Rovčanin passed youth categories of Partizan. After his youth career, Rovčanin joined HNK Čapljina, where he was playing between 2012 and 2013. Later he was with NK Iskra Bugojno in 2014, and NK Jedinstvo Bihać from 2014 to 2015. For the 2015–16 season, Rovčanin joined Metalleghe-BSI. In summer 2016, he signed a three-year contract with Serbian SuperLiga side Metalac Gornji Milanovac.
