= Marko Mijailović =

Serbian footballer

Personal information
- Date of birth: 14 August 1997 (age 29)
- Place of birth: Užice, FR Yugoslavia
- Height: 1.88 m (6 ft 2 in)
- Positions: Centre-back; full-back

Team information
- Current team: Radnički Niš
- Number: 2

Youth career
- 2011–2015: Red Star Belgrade

Senior career*
Years	Team	Apps	(Gls)
2014–2017	Red Star Belgrade	0	(0)
2015	→ Kolubara (loan)	0	(0)
2016–2017	→ Bežanija (loan)	36	(2)
2017–2018	Rad	10	(0)
2018–2019	Bežanija	19	(0)
2019–2021	Mačva Šabac	74	(2)
2021–2023	Voždovac	64	(2)
2023	Olimpija Ljubljana	1	(0)
2024–2025	Spartak Subotica	42	(0)
2025–	Radnički Niš	32	(0)

International career^{‡}
2013–2014	Serbia U17	5	(1)
2015–2016	Serbia U19	5	(1)
2023	Serbia	1	(0)
- * Club domestic league appearances and goals as of 13 June 2026 ‡ National team caps and goals as of 26 January 2023

Marko Mijailović (Serbian Cyrillic: Марко Мијаиловић; born 14 August 1997) is a Serbian professional footballer who plays as a defender for Radnički Niš.

== Club career ==
=== Red Star Belgrade ===
Born in Užice, Mijailović came through the Red Star Belgrade youth categories. He joined the first team in 2014 under coach Nenad Lalatović, and made his senior debut for Red Star in a friendly match against Udinese on 15 November 2014. Later that month, Mijailović remained on the bench as an unused substitution in the 14th round of the 2014–15 Serbian SuperLiga season against OFK Beograd. During the winter break, Mijailović was loaned to the Serbian First League side Kolubara, but he remained in the youth team throughout 2015. Mijailović was with the first team for several friendly games during 2015, including matches against OFK Bor, Gračanica and Mordovia Saransk.

After fully recovering from an injury he picked up in early 2016, Mijailović was loaned to Bežanija, where he made nine appearances and scored one goal until the end of the 2015–16 season. In summer 2016, Mijailović extended his loan for the 2016–17 season. Although he spent the mid-season training with Red Star, head coach Miodrag Božović decided to leave him with Bežanija until the end of season.

=== Rad ===
On 18 August 2017, Mijailović joined Rad as a free agent. He was officially unveiled on 24 August, signing a three-year contract with the club.

=== Voždovac ===
On 1 July 2021, he joined Voždovac.

== International career ==
Mijailović was a youth international for Serbia, and represented the under-16, under-17 and under-18 teams between 2012 and 2016. In November 2016, he was called into the under-20 squad under coach Nenad Lalatović, where he made his debut in a match against Montenegro.

Mijailović made his debut for the senior team on 26 January 2023 in a friendly match against the United States, starting the match in an eventual 2–1 victory.

== Personal life ==
He is the younger brother of Srđan Mijailović.

== Career statistics ==
=== Club ===
As of 10 June 2017

Appearances and goals by club, season and competition
Club	Season	League			National cup		Continental		Total	
Club	Season	Division	Apps	Goals	Apps	Goals	Apps	Goals	Apps	Goals
Red Star Belgrade	2014–15	SuperLiga	0	0	0	0	—		0	0
Red Star Belgrade	2015–16	SuperLiga	0	0	0	0	0	0	0	0
Red Star Belgrade	Total		0	0	0	0	0	0	0	0
Kolubara (loan)	2014–15	First League	0	0	—		—		0	0
Bežanija (loan)	2015–16	First League	9	1	—		—		9	1
Bežanija (loan)	2016–17	First League	27	1	1	0	—		28	1
Bežanija (loan)	Total		36	2	1	0	—		37	2
Rad	2017–18	SuperLiga	0	0	0	0	—		0	0
Career total			36	2	1	0	0	0	37	2

=== International ===
As of 26 January 2023

Appearances and goals by national team and year
National team	Year	Apps	Goals
Serbia	2023	1	0
Total		1	0
