= Milivoj Krmar =

Serbian footballer

Personal information
- Full name: Milivoj Krmar
- Date of birth: 1 April 1997 (age 29)
- Place of birth: Ostojićevo, FR Yugoslavia
- Height: 1.83 m (6 ft 0 in)
- Position: Attacking midfielder

Youth career
- Spartak Subotica

Senior career*
Years	Team	Apps	(Gls)
2016–2019	Spartak Subotica	18	(1)
2017–2018	→ Bačka 1901 (loan)	23	(9)
2019	Hajduk Kula		
2019	Radnički Zrenjanin		
2020	Timočanin		
2020	Krupa	2	(0)
2021	BSK Borča		
2022	Tisa Adorjan		
2023	Senta		
2023	Bečej 1918		
Total		43	(10)
- * Club domestic league appearances and goals as of 13 September 2020

Milivoj Krmar (Serbian Cyrillic: Миливој Крмар; born 1 April 1997) is a Serbian footballer who plays as an attacking midfielder.

== Club career ==
=== Spartak Subotica ===
Krmar passed all Spartak Subotica youth selections. He signed scholarship contract with club in summer 2013. After the end of his youth career, Milivoj joined the first-team squad, signing a three-year professional contract with club in summer 2016. He made his debut in the 3rd fixture of the 2016–17 Serbian SuperLiga season, against Radnik Surdulica, replacing a captain Vladimir Torbica. In the next fixture, he scored a goal in defeat against Novi Pazar, during the match which he also started as a reserve player. Krmar also scored a goal in a Serbian Cup match against OFK Bačka, played on 20 September 2016. Krmar collected 19 appearances with 2 goals in both domestic competitions. After he started the new season as a back-up player, making an appearance in a match against Borac Čačak, Krmar moved on a half-season loan deal to Bačka 1901 in summer 2017. In February 2018, passing the winter-break with Spartak, Krmar extended a loan deal to Bačka 1901 until the end of season, making 23 appearances in the Serbian League Vojvodina and scoring 9 goals at total.

=== Hajduk Kula, Radnički Zrenjanin and Timočanin ===
On 18 January 2019, Hajduk Kula confirmed on their Facebook profile, that they had signed Krmar. In the summer 2019, he left Hajduk Kula and joined Radnički Zrenjanin. He later on played for Timočanin.

=== Krupa ===
On 22 July 2020, Krmar signed a three-year contract with Bosnian Premier League club Krupa. He made his official debut for the club in a league match against Borac Banja Luka on 31 August 2020. Krmar terminated his contract with the club on 19 December 2020.

== Career statistics ==
=== Club ===
As of match played 13 September 2020.

Appearances and goals by club, season and competition
Club	Season	League			Cup		Continental		Other		Total	
Club	Season	Division	Apps	Goals	Apps	Goals	Apps	Goals	Apps	Goals	Apps	Goals
Spartak Subotica	2015–16	Serbian SuperLiga	0	0	0	0	—		—		0	0
Spartak Subotica	2016–17	Serbian SuperLiga	17	1	2	1	—		—		19	2
Spartak Subotica	2017–18	Serbian SuperLiga	1	0	—		—		—		1	0
Spartak Subotica	Total		18	1	2	1	—		—		20	2
Bačka 1901 (loan)	2017–18	Serbian League Vojvodina	23	9	—		—		—		23	9
Krupa	2020–21	Bosnian Premier League	2	0	0	0	—		—		2	0
Career total			43	10	2	1	—		—		45	11
