= Nemanja Milić =

Serbian footballer

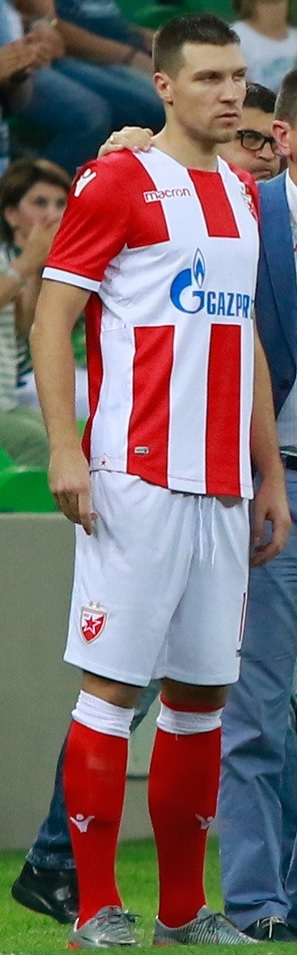
- Milić with Red Star in 2017

Personal information
- Full name: Nemanja Milić
- Date of birth: 25 May 1990 (age 36)
- Place of birth: Sombor, SFR Yugoslavia
- Height: 1.88 m (6 ft 2 in)
- Position: Forward

Youth career
- –2007: OFK Beograd

Senior career*
Years	Team	Apps	(Gls)
2007–2013	OFK Beograd	89	(13)
2013–2016	Spartak Subotica	80	(17)
2017–2018	Red Star Belgrade	28	(3)
2019–2022	BATE Borisov	96	(21)
2023	Mladost GAT	17	(3)
Total		310	(57)

International career^{‡}
2006	Serbia U17	2	(1)
2008–2009	Serbia U19	11	(2)
2011	Serbia U21	1	(0)
- * Club domestic league appearances and goals as of 27 May 2023 ‡ National team caps and goals as of 28 December 2016

Nemanja Milić (Serbian Cyrillic: Немања Милић; born 25 May 1990) is a Serbian retired professional footballer who played as a winger.

== Club career ==
=== OFK Beograd ===
Born in Sombor, Milić started his career with OFK Beograd, where he passed youth categories. He made his senior debut for the club during the 2006–07 Serbian SuperLiga season, as one of the academy players with the best prospects. After he spent the next season playing with youth team, Milić joined the first team of OFK Beograd in the 2008–09 Serbian SuperLiga season. At the beginning of 2009, Milić was scouted by Liverpool. For his first senior season, Milić made 26 appearances in all competitions including two matches in the UEFA Intertoto Cup. He scored his first senior goal on 23 May 2009 in away match against Borac Čačak. In the 2009–10 season, Milić scored 6 goals on 20 SuperLiga caps. Scoring 4 goals on 28 matches in all competitions for the 2010–11 season, he was related with Aston Villa in autumn 2011. Previously, he scored both goals in 2–0 victory against Jagodina in 2nd fixture match of the 2011–12 Serbian SuperLiga season, entering the game as a substitution. Milić collected 11 more games, but without goals for the rest of that season. Milić also scored 2 goals in the first half of the 2012–13 season, against Radnički Niš in the SuperLiga, and against Sloga Kraljevo in the Serbian Cup match. After many injury problems, Milić missed the whole spring half-season and left the club in summer 2013 as a free agent.

=== Spartak Subotica ===
In July 2013, Milić joined Hajduk Kula at the first, but later moved and signed a deal with Spartak Subotica. During the first season with new club, Milić made 16 league and 5 cup appearances and scored 1 goal. Scoring 7 league goals on 26 SuperLiga matches, he promoted himself as the best scorer of Spartak Subotica for the 2014–15 season. In the 2015–16 Serbian SuperLiga season, coach Andrey Chernyshov paired Milić with Ognjen Mudrinski in attack. During the first half of 2016–17, Milić was mostly used second striker, scoring 6 SuperLiga goals. Ending of 2016, he was elected for the best player of Spartak Subotica and the best footballer of Sombor, who performs in the Serbian SuperLiga.

=== Red Star Belgrade ===
On 10 January 2017, Milić signed a three-and-a-half-year contract with Red Star Belgrade. He made his debut for new club on 25 February 2017, replacing Srđan Plavšić in the second half of a match against Bačka Bačka Palanka. Milić started his first match on the field in a 27 fixture match of the 2016–17 Serbian SuperLiga season against Čukarički, instead of injured John Jairo Ruiz. Several days later, Milić was a scorer in a friendly match against Spartak Moscow, played at the Rajko Mitić Stadium. Milić scored his first goal for the club in a regular game in 4–2 victory against Mladost Lučani.

=== BATE Borisov ===
On 28 December 2018, Milić signed a three-year contract with FC BATE Borisov in a €300,000 transfer from Red Star Belgrade.

=== Mladost Novi Sad ===
In December 2022, he returned to Serbian football by signing for Serbian SuperLiga club Mladost Novi Sad.

== Career statistics ==
=== Club ===
As of June 2022

Appearances and goals by club, season and competition
Club	Season	League			Cup		Continental		Other		Total	
Club	Season	Division	Apps	Goals	Apps	Goals	Apps	Goals	Apps	Goals	Apps	Goals
OFK Beograd	2006–07	SuperLiga	1	0	0	0	0	0	—		1	0
OFK Beograd	2007–08	SuperLiga	0	0	0	0	—		—		0	0
OFK Beograd	2008–09	SuperLiga	24	1	0	0	2	0	—		26	1
OFK Beograd	2009–10	SuperLiga	20	6	0	0	—		—		20	6
OFK Beograd	2010–11	SuperLiga	23	3	1	1	4	0	—		28	4
OFK Beograd	2011–12	SuperLiga	12	2	0	0	—		—		12	2
OFK Beograd	2012–13	SuperLiga	9	1	2	1	—		—		11	2
OFK Beograd	Total		89	13	3	2	6	0	—		98	15
Spartak Subotica	2013–14	SuperLiga	16	1	5	0	—		—		21	1
Spartak Subotica	2014–15	SuperLiga	26	7	2	0	—		—		28	7
Spartak Subotica	2015–16	SuperLiga	19	3	3	0	—		—		22	3
Spartak Subotica	2016–17	SuperLiga	19	6	2	0	—		—		21	6
Spartak Subotica	Total		80	17	12	1	—		—		92	18
Red Star Belgrade	2016–17	SuperLiga	10	1	3	1	—		—		13	2
Red Star Belgrade	2017–18	SuperLiga	13	2	2	1	9	0	—		24	3
Red Star Belgrade	2018–19	SuperLiga	5	0	0	0	6	0	—		11	0
Red Star Belgrade	Total		28	3	5	2	15	0	—		48	5
BATE	2019	Premier League	20	4	0	0	2	0	—		22	4
BATE	2020	Premier League	24	8	5	0	3	0	—		32	8
BATE	2021	Premier League	25	3	6	2	1	0	1 (Note: Appearance in Kazakhstan Super Cup)	0	33	5
BATE	2022	Premier League	9	1	6	2	2	0	1	0	18	3
BATE	Total		78	16	17	4	8	0	2	0	105	20
Career total			275	49	37	9	29	0	2	0	343	58

== Honours ==
=== Club ===
Red Star Belgrade

- Serbian SuperLiga: 2017–18
