= King Peter I Stadium =

Stadium in Belgrade, Serbia

- Стадион Краљ Петар Први
- Стадион на Бањици
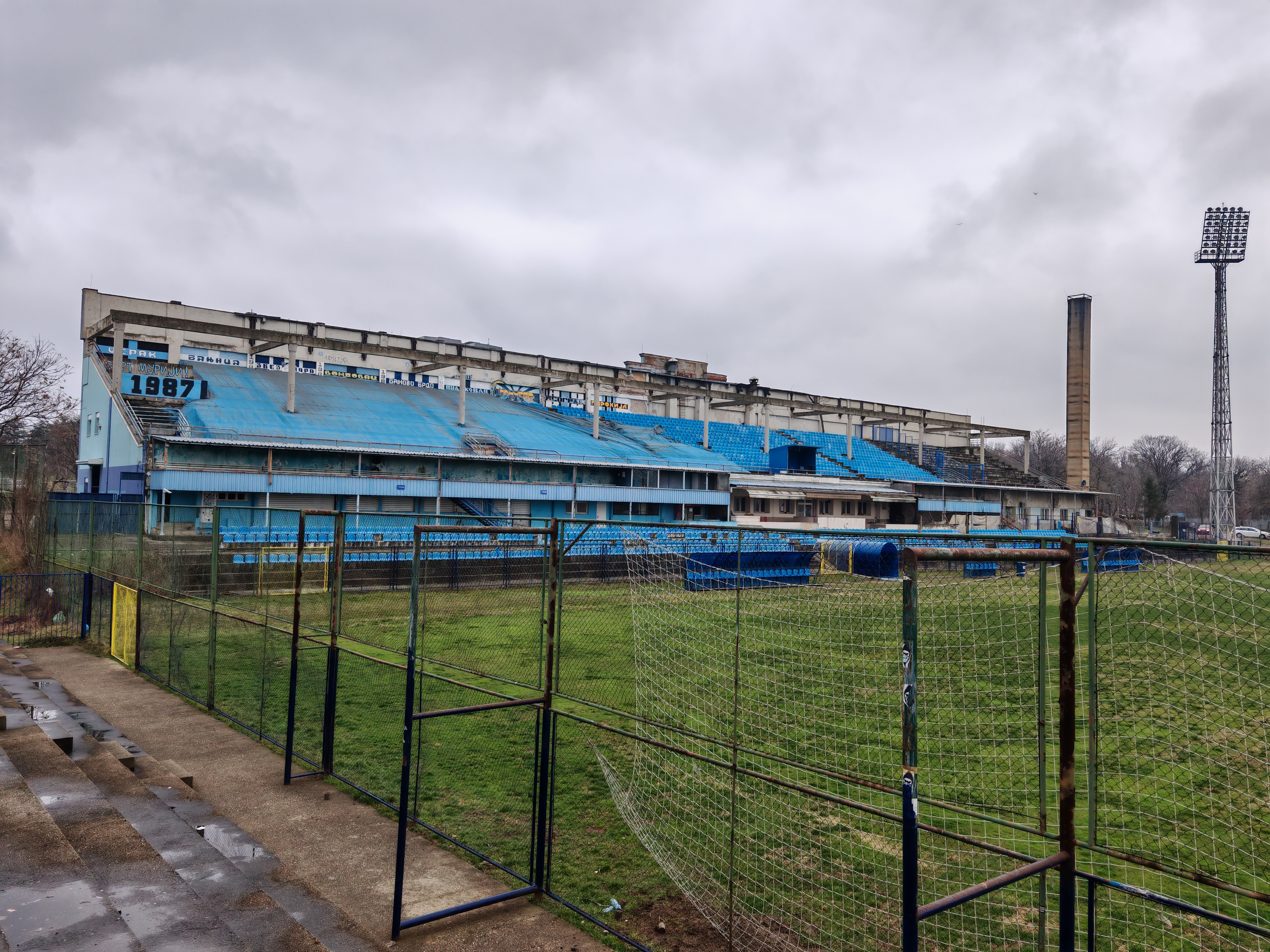
- View on the west stand of King Peter I Stadium from the south stand, February 2026

- Location within Belgrade
- Location: Voždovac, Belgrade, Serbia
- Coordinates: 44°45′54″N 20°28′20″E
- Capacity: 3,919 seats 6,000 (total capacity)
- Surface: Grass

Construction
- Opened: 13 August 1977; 49 years ago

Tenant
- FK Rad (1977–present)

King Peter I Stadium (Serbian Cyrillic: Стадион Краљ Петар Први) is a football stadium located in Voždovac, Belgrade, Serbia. It has 3,919 seats (with the total capacity of 6,000), and is the home ground of FK Rad.

== History ==
The stadium was opened on 13 August 1977, with the first official match being played between FK Rad and FK Bregalnica Štip, with Rad winning 2:0.

In April 2015, a fire broke out at the rooftop of the west stand of the stadium. In February 2017, while FK Rad was still playing in the top-tier nation league SuperLiga, the stadium was suspended due to "inappropriate behavior of FC Rad fans who racially insulted players".

== Gallery ==
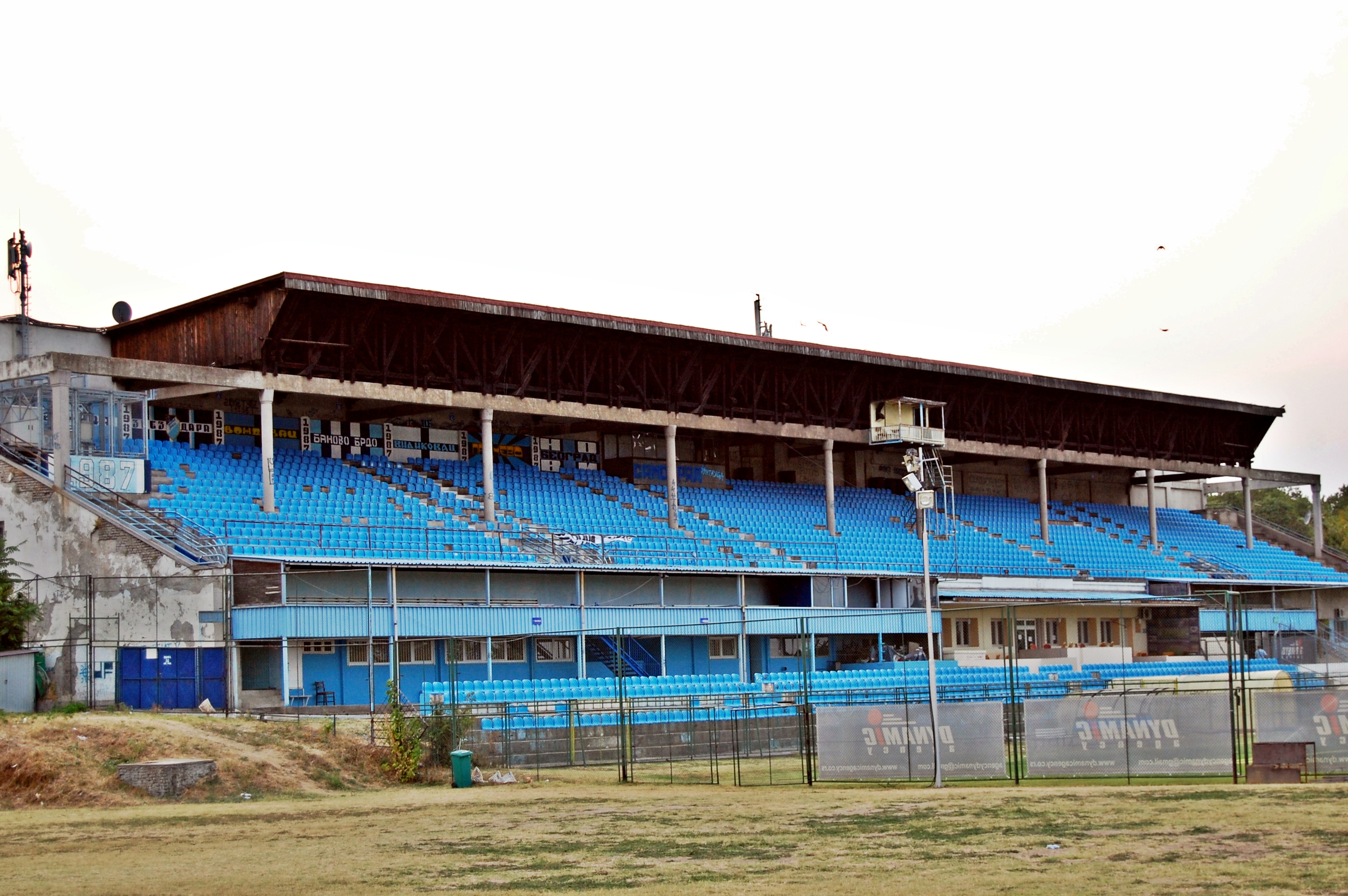
View on the west stand of Stadium King Peter I, August 2012

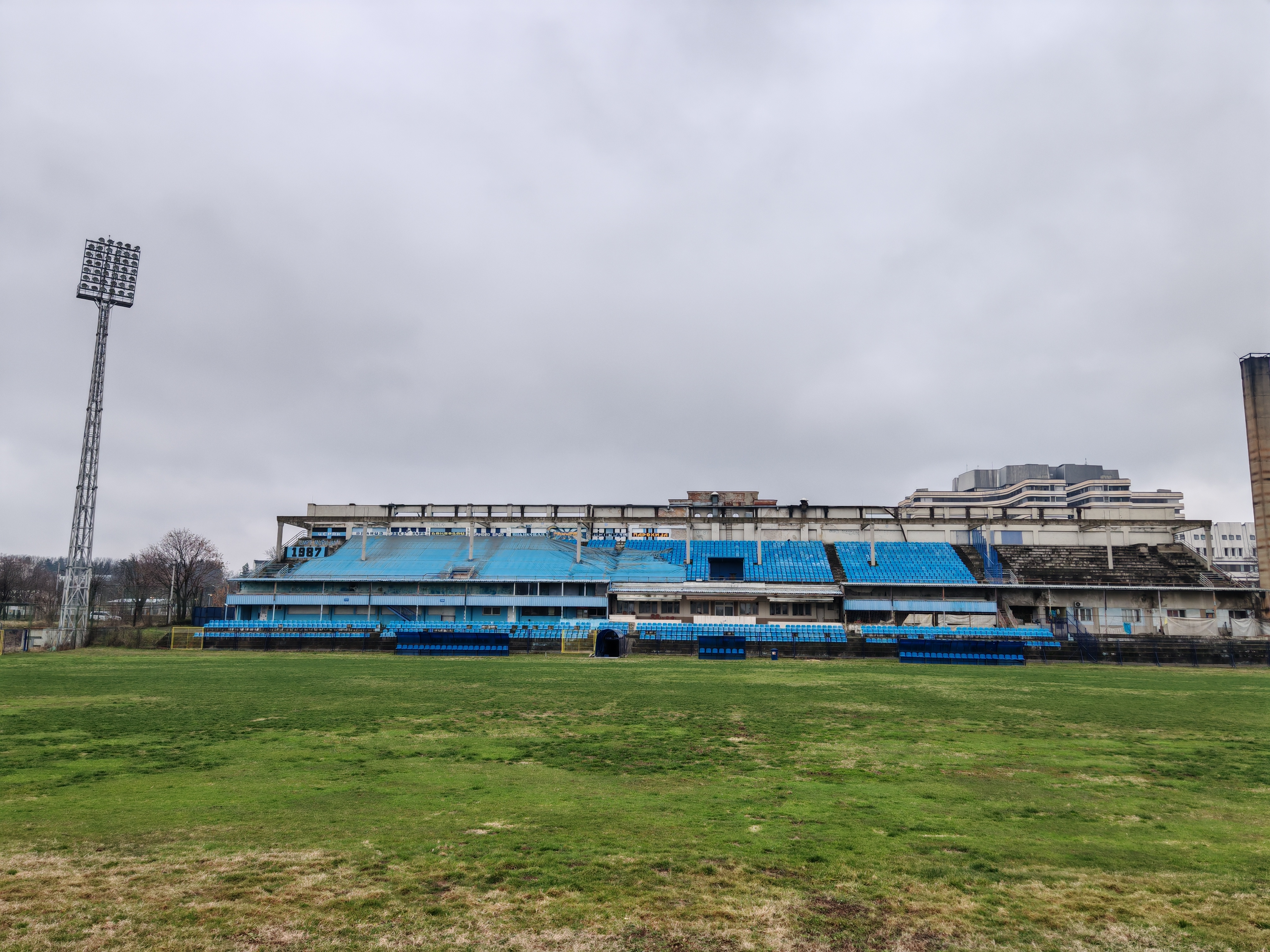
View on the football pitch of King Peter I Stadium from the east, February 2026

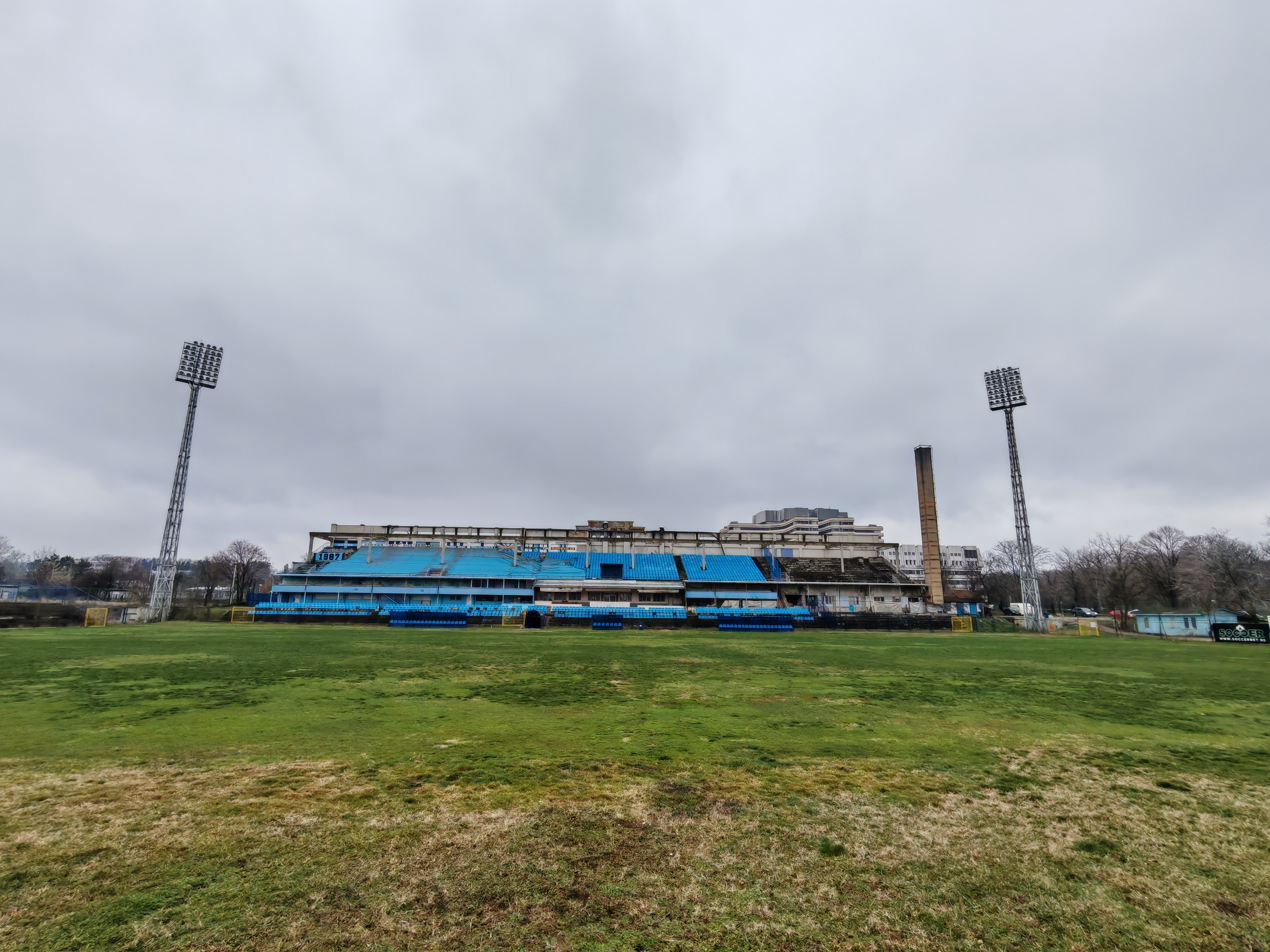
View (large) on the football pitch of King Peter I Stadium from the east

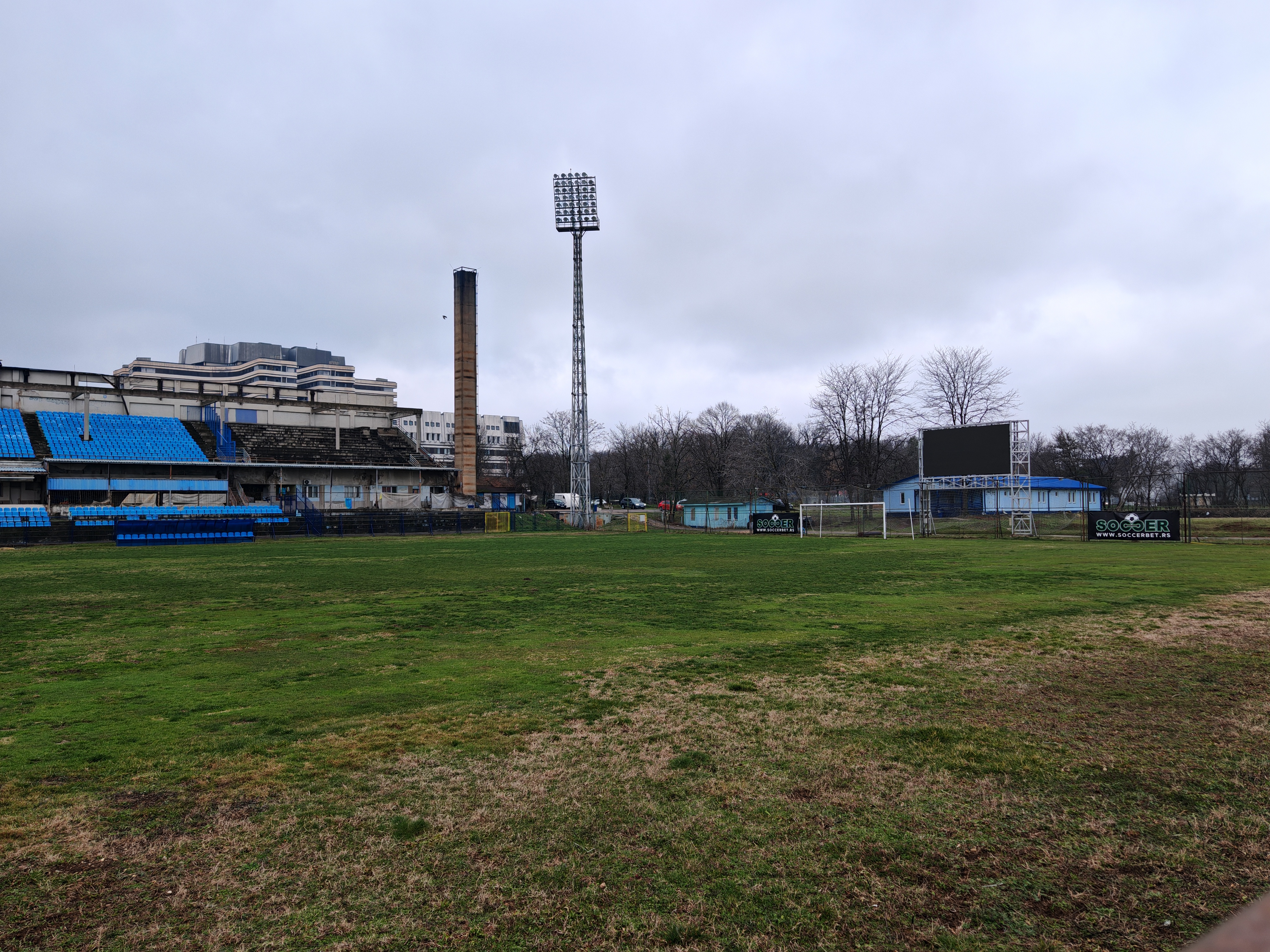
View towards the northwest of King Peter I Stadium from the east

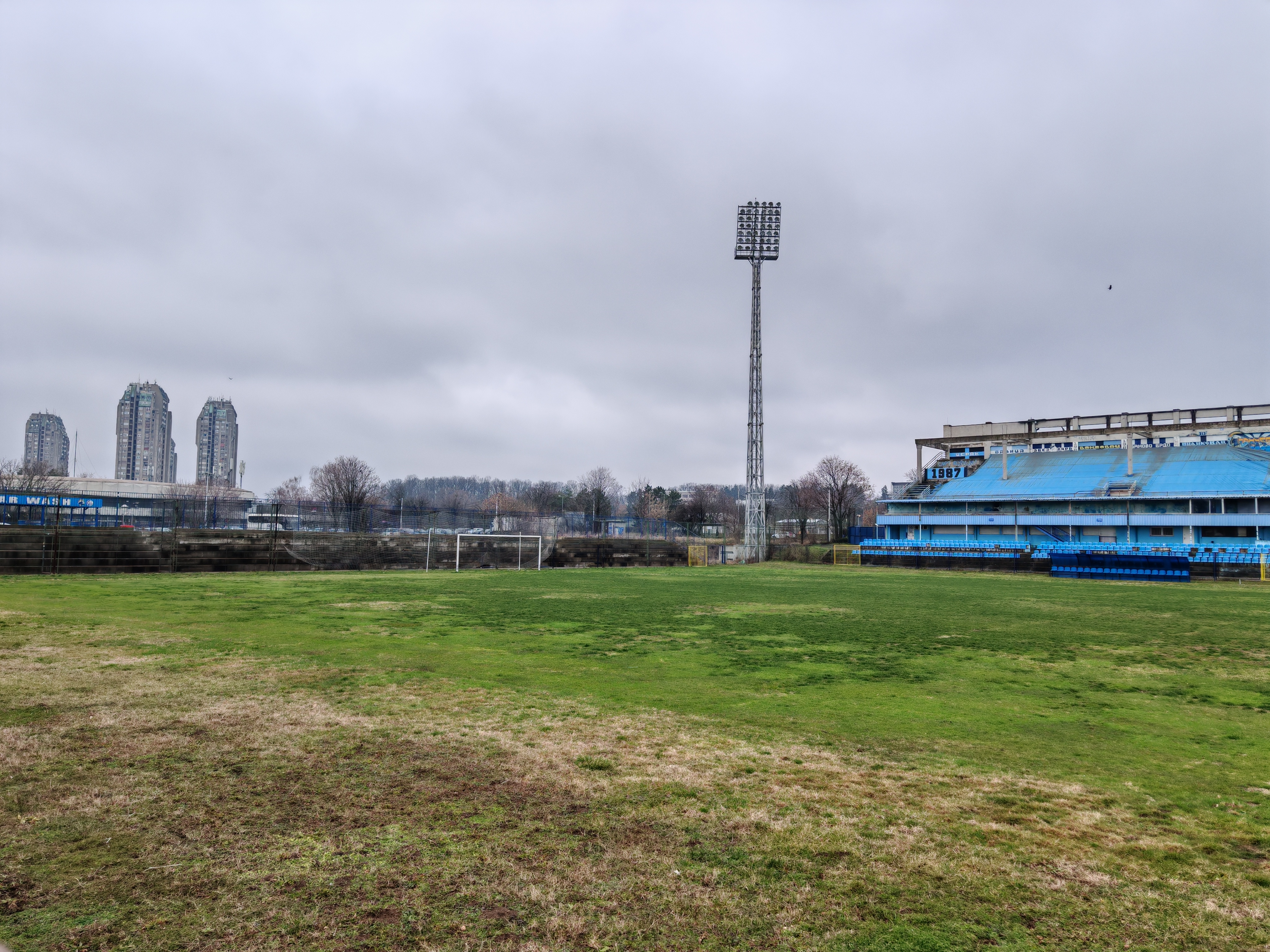
View towards the southwest of King Peter I Stadium from the east

== See also ==
- List of football stadiums in Serbia
