= Damir Kahriman =

Serbian footballer

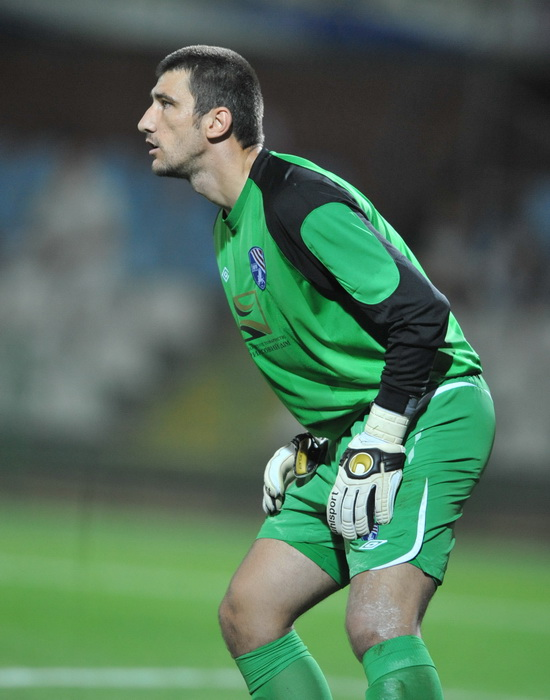
- Kahriman in 2011

Personal information
- Date of birth: 19 November 1984 (age 41)
- Place of birth: Titovo Užice, SFR Yugoslavia
- Height: 1.92 m (6 ft 4 in)
- Position: Goalkeeper

Youth career
- Sloboda Užice

Senior career*
Years	Team	Apps	(Gls)
2001–2003	Sloboda Užice	12	(0)
2003–2004	Javor Ivanjica	23	(0)
2004–2006	Zemun	16	(0)
2006–2008	Vojvodina	49	(0)
2008	Konyaspor	5	(0)
2008–2009	Rad	26	(0)
2009–2010	Javor Ivanjica	40	(0)
2011–2014	Tavriya	77	(0)
2014–2018	Red Star Belgrade	47	(0)
2019	Iraklis	13	(0)
2019–2020	Lamia	4	(0)
2020–2021	Rad	28	(0)
2021	Radnički Niš	21	(0)
2022	Javor Ivanjica	15	(0)

International career
2006–2007	Serbia U21	8	(0)
2008–2016	Serbia	8	(0)
Medal record
Silver medal – second place	UEFA Under-21 Championship	2007
- * Club domestic league appearances and goals

Damir Kahriman (Serbian Cyrillic: Дамир Кахриман; born 19 November 1984) is a Serbian former professional footballer who played as a goalkeeper.

He was a member of the Serbia U21 national team, especially during the 2007 UEFA European Under-21 Football Championship held in the Netherlands in which Serbia reached the final and the keeper was selected for the tournament's starting eleven. He also earned eight caps for the senior national team, all in friendlies between 2008 and 2016.

== Career statistics ==
Serbia national team
Year	Apps	Goals
2008	1	0
2011	2	0
2012	3	0
2013	1	0
2016	1	0
Total	8	0

== Honours ==
Red Star Belgrade

- Serbian SuperLiga: 2015–16, 2017–18

Serbia

- UEFA European Under-21 Championship runner-up: 2007

Individual

- Serbian SuperLiga Team of the Season: 2015–16
