= FK Bežanija =

Serbian football club

Bežanija
- Full name: Fudbalski Klub Bežanija
- Nickname: Lavovi (The Lions)
- Founded: 1921; 105 years ago
- Ground: Stadion FK Bežanija
- Capacity: 2,500
- President: Jovan Rusić
- Head coach: Dejan Ejupović
- League: Belgrade Zone League
- 2024–25: Belgrade Zone League, 7th
- Website: fcbezanija.com
Home colours	Away colours

FK Bežanija (Serbian Cyrillic: ФК Бежанија) is a football club based in Bežanija, Belgrade, Serbia. They compete in the Belgrade Zone League, the fourth tier of the national league system.

== History ==
Founded in 1921, the club changed its name several times in its early stages, being known as Soko, BSK and finally HŠK (during the Axis occupation of Yugoslavia). They adopted the new name Jedinstvo following the end of World War II in 1946, becoming a member of the Novi Sad Football Association. After competing in the Srem League for six years, the club joined the Belgrade Football Association in 1952. They would change their name to Bežanija ahead of the 1955–56 season.

Following the breakup of Yugoslavia, the club won the Serbian League Belgrade in 2000 and took promotion to the Second League of FR Yugoslavia, reaching the second tier for the first time ever. They competed in Group North for two seasons, finishing bottom of the table in 2002. However, the club instantly won the Serbian League Belgrade to earn promotion back to the second tier in 2003.

In the 2005–06 campaign, the club finished as Serbian First League champions and earned promotion to the newly formed Serbian SuperLiga. They became the biggest surprise of the competition's inaugural 2006–07 season (despite playing their home games at Železnik), placing fourth and securing a spot in the 2007–08 UEFA Cup. However, the club was eliminated in the first qualifying round by Albanian side Besa Kavajë on the away goals rule (2–2 on aggregate), without losing a game.

After suffering relegation in the 2007–08 Serbian SuperLiga, the club went on to spend 11 consecutive seasons in the Serbian First League, finishing in fourth place on three occasions during this time. They were forced to withdraw from the league due to financial difficulties following the conclusion of the 2018–19 season, finding themselves in the Belgrade Intermunicipal League, the sixth tier of Serbian football. In June 2021, the club marked its 100th anniversary.

== Honours ==
Serbian First League (Tier 2)

- 2005–06

Serbian League Belgrade (Tier 3)

- 1999–2000, 2002–03

Belgrade First League (Tier 5)

- 2023–24 (Group A)

== Seasons ==
Season	League									Cup	Continental
Season	Division	Pld	W	D	L	GF	GA	Pts	Pos	Cup	Continental
Serbia and Montenegro
1998–99	3 – Belgrade	17 (Note: The season was cut short due to the NATO bombing of Yugoslavia.)	–	–	–	–	–	19	11th	—	—
1999–2000	3 – Belgrade	34	23	8	3	68	28	77	1st	—	—
2000–01	2 – North	34	13	4	17	45	58	43	10th	—	—
2001–02	2 – North	34	4	6	24	24	76	18	18th	—	—
2002–03	3 – Belgrade	34	22	6	6	65	28	72	1st	—	—
2003–04	2 – North	36	21	5	10	72	49	68	4th	—	—
2004–05	2 – Serbia	38	17	7	14	59	53	58	5th	—	—
2005–06	2 – Serbia	38	25	7	6	70	25	82	1st	—	—
Serbia
2006–07	1	32	12	12	8	36	31	48	4th	Quarter-finals	—
2007–08	1	33	5	4	24	31	58	17 (Note: The club was docked two points.)	12th	Round of 16	UEFA Cup – First qualifying round
2008–09	2	34	8	13	13	34	40	37	15th	Round of 16	—
2009–10	2	34	14	11	9	34	28	53	4th	Round of 32	—
2010–11	2	34	11	7	16	26	28	40	12th	Round of 32	—
2011–12	2	34	11	19	4	33	15	52	4th	Preliminary round	—
2012–13	2	34	11	11	12	41	32	44	8th	Round of 32	—
2013–14	2	30	11	12	7	34	26	45	4th	Round of 32	—
2014–15	2	30	11	7	12	25	27	40	9th	Round of 32	—
2015–16	2	30	11	10	9	35	27	43	5th	Round of 16	—
2016–17	2	30	12	12	6	36	22	47 (Note: The club was docked one point.)	5th	Round of 32	—
2017–18	2	30	11	11	8	35	32	44	7th	Round of 32	—
2018–19	2	37	15	5	17	48	50	28	7th (Note: The club withdrew from the league due to financial problems.)	Round of 32	—
2019-20	6	14 (Note: The season was cut short due to the COVID-19 pandemic in Serbia.)	7	3	4	29	23	24	3rd		
2020-21	6	20	7	8	5	26	20	29	5th		
2021-22	6	26	14	4	8	66	44	46	4th		
2022-23	6	24	20	0	4	96	21	60	1st		
2023-24	5	26	18	5	3	78	24	59	1st		
2024-25	4	26	12	5	9	46	45	41	7th		

== European record ==
Season	Competition	Round	Opponent	Score	Aggregate
2007–08	UEFA Cup	First qualifying round	(Albania) Besa Kavajë	2–2 (H), 0–0 (A)	2–2

== Notable players ==
This is a list of players who have played at full international level.

- (Bosnia and Herzegovina) Samir Memišević
- (Democratic Republic of the Congo) Ibrahim Somé Salombo
- (Kyrgyzstan) Viktor Kelm
- (Montenegro) Darko Božović
- (Montenegro) Đorđije Ćetković
- (Montenegro) Dejan Damjanović
- (Montenegro) Milan Purović
- (Montenegro) Marko Simić
- (North Korea) Hong Yong-jo
- (North Macedonia) Mario Đurovski
- (North Macedonia) Nikola Gligorov
- (North Macedonia) Bojan Markoski
- (North Macedonia) Perica Stančeski
- (Serbia) Milan Biševac
- (Serbia) Aleksandar Busnić
- (Serbia) Nenad Lukić
- (Serbia) Filip Manojlović
- (Serbia) Marko Mijailović
- (Serbia) Milovan Milović
- (Serbia) Antonio Rukavina
- (Serbia) Bojan Šaranov
- (Serbia) Lazar Tufegdžić
- (Serbia and Montenegro) Ivan Dudić
- (Serbia and Montenegro) Miloš Kolaković

For a list of all FK Bežanija players with a Wikipedia article, see Category:FK Bežanija players.

== Historical list of coaches ==
- (Serbia and Montenegro) Velimir Đorđević
- (Serbia and Montenegro) Miroslav Helc
- (Serbia and Montenegro) Slaviša Božičić (2003–2004)
- (Serbia and Montenegro) Stanislav Karasi (2004)
- (Serbia and Montenegro) Nebojša Vučković
- (Serbia and Montenegro) Darko Nović
- (Serbia and Montenegro) Miroslav Helc
- (Serbia and Montenegro) Čedomir Đoinčević (2005–2006)
- (Serbia and Montenegro) Branko Smiljanić (2006)
- (Serbia) Dragoljub Bekvalac (2006–2007)
- (Serbia) Ratko Dostanić (2007)
- (Serbia) Miloljub Ostojić (2007)
- (Serbia) Ratko Dostanić (2007)
- (Serbia) Ljubiša Stamenković (2007–2008)
- (Serbia) Slaviša Božičić (2008–2009)
- (Serbia) Dušan Kljajić (2009)
- (Serbia) Aleksandar Janjić (2009–2011)
- (Serbia) Ivica Šimičić (2011)
- (Serbia) Saša Nikolić (2011–2012)
- (Serbia) Ivica Šimičić (2012)
- (Serbia) Aleksandar Janjić (2012)
- (Serbia) Gordan Petrić (2012–2013)
- (Serbia) Aleksandar Stanković (2013) (caretaker)
- (Serbia) Dušan Kljajić (2013–2014)
- (Serbia) Saša Štrbac (2014)
- (Serbia) Vanja Radinović (2014–2015)
- (Serbia) Nenad Vanić (2015)
- (Serbia) Srđan Blagojević (2015–2016)
- (Serbia) Milija Žižić (2017)
- (Serbia) Dušan Đorđević (2017)
- (Serbia) Srđan Blagojević (2017)
- (Serbia) Aleksandar Stanković (2017–2018)
- (Serbia) Goran Dragoljić (2018–2019)
- (Serbia) Dejan Ejupović (2024-)
