= 2017–18 FK Partizan season =

FK Partizan
2017–18 season
- President: Milorad Vučelić
- Head coach: Miroslav Đukić
- Stadium: Partizan Stadium
- SuperLiga: 2nd
- Serbian Cup: Winners
- Champions League: Third qualifying round
- Europa League: Round of 32
- Top goalscorer: League: Léandre Tawamba (12); All: Léandre Tawamba (19)
- Highest home attendance: 24,658 vs Olympiacos (25 July 2017)
- Lowest home attendance: 1,000 vs Rad (15 November 2017)
Home colours	Away colours

The 2017–18 season will be Fudbalski klub Partizan's 71st season in existence and the club's 12th competing in the Serbian SuperLiga.

== Transfers ==
=== In ===
Date	Position	Name	From	Type	Ref.
8 June 2017	DF	(Bosnia and Herzegovina) Aleksandar Subić	(Bosnia and Herzegovina) Sloboda Tuzla	Loan return	
17 June 2017	MF	(Serbia) Danilo Pantić	(England) Chelsea	Loan	
29 June 2017	DF	(Serbia) Nemanja Miletić	(Belgium) Westerlo	Transfer	
18 July 2017	MF	(Guinea) Seydouba Soumah	(Slovakia) Slovan Bratislava	Transfer	
12 August 2017	FW	(Nigeria) Theophilus Solomon	(Croatia) Rijeka	Loan	
15 August 2017	GK	(Serbia) Vladimir Stojković	(England) Nottingham Forest	Free transfer	
28 August 2017	MF	(Serbia) Zoran Tošić	(Russia) CSKA Moscow	Free transfer	
29 August 2017	DF	(Serbia) Milan Mitrović	(Turkey) Mersin İdmanyurdu	Free transfer	
30 August 2017	DF	(Serbia) Nemanja Antonov	(Switzerland) Grasshopper	Loan	
31 August 2017	FW	(Serbia) Ognjen Ožegović	(Serbia) Čukarički	Transfer	
11 January 2018	DF	(Serbia) Slobodan Urošević	(Serbia) Napredak Kruševac	Transfer	
23 January 2018	FW	(Serbia) Đorđe Ivanović	(Serbia) Spartak Subotica	Transfer	
24 January 2018	MF	(Ukraine) Yuriy Vakulko	(Ukraine) Dnipro	Free transfer	
30 January 2018	MF	(Serbia) Saša Zdjelar	(Greece) Olympiacos	Loan	
1 February 2018	MF	(Burkina Faso) Dramane Salou	(Burkina Faso) Salitas	Free transfer	

=== Out ===
Date	Position	Name	From	Type	Ref.
3 June 2017	DF	(Serbia) Nikola Milenković	(Italy) Fiorentina	Transfer	
10 July 2017	MF	(Serbia) Marko Golubović	(Serbia) Radnički Niš	Free transfer	
26 July 2017	FW	(Serbia) Miloš Kukolj	(Serbia) Dinamo Pančevo	Loan	
28 July 2017	MF	(Serbia) Nemanja Mihajlović	(Netherlands) Heerenveen	Transfer	
28 July 2017	DF	(Bosnia and Herzegovina) Aleksandar Subić	(Serbia) Radnički Niš	Loan	
3 August 2017	MF	(Brazil) Leonardo	(Saudi Arabia) Al-Ahli	Transfer	
23 August 2017	MF	(Serbia) Ivan Petrović	(Slovenia) Brežice	Free transfer	
30 August 2017	FW	(Serbia) Uroš Đurđević	(Greece) Olympiacos	Transfer	
27 December 2017	DF	(Libya) Mohamed El Monir	(United States) Orlando City	Free transfer	
29 December 2017	MF	(Serbia) Alen Stevanović	(Japan) Shonan Bellmare	Free transfer	
30 December 2017	GK	(Serbia) Filip Kljajić	(Greece) Platanias	Loan	
2 January 2018	MF	(Serbia) Petar Đuričković	(Greece) Xanthi	Free transfer	
10 January 2018	FW	(Nigeria) Theophilus Solomon	(Croatia) Rijeka	Loan return	
19 January 2018	MF	(Brazil) Everton Luiz	(Italy) SPAL	Transfer	
23 January 2018	DF	(Serbia) Lazar Ćirković	(Switzerland) Luzern	Free transfer	
25 January 2018	GK	(Serbia) Nemanja Stevanović	(Serbia) Rad	Loan	
25 January 2018	MF	(Serbia) Veljko Birmančević	(Serbia) Rad	Loan	
12 February 2018	GK	(Serbia) Đorđe Lazović	(Serbia) Radnički Niš	Free transfer	
22 February 2018	FW	(Serbia) Dušan Vlahović	(Italy) Fiorentina	Transfer	
27 February 2018	MF	(Serbia) Milan Radin	(Kazakhstan) Aktobe	Free transfer	
27 February 2018	MF	(Serbia) Saša Marjanović	(Kazakhstan) Aktobe	Free transfer	

== Players ==
=== Squad ===
No.	Name	Nationality	Position (s)	Date of birth (age)	Signed from	Notes
Goalkeepers
41	Aleksandar Popović	(Serbia)	GK	29 September 1999 (age 26)	(Serbia) Teleoptik	
61	Marko Jovičić	(Serbia)	GK	2 February 1995 (age 31)	(Serbia) Teleoptik	
88	Vladimir Stojković	(Serbia)	GK	28 July 1983 (age 43)	(England) Nottingham Forest	Third captain
Defenders
2	Luka Cucin	(Serbia)	RB	24 November 1998 (age 27)	(Serbia) Teleoptik	
4	Miroslav Vulićević	(Serbia)	RB	29 May 1985 (age 41)	(Serbia) Vojvodina	Vice-captain
5	Strahinja Bošnjak	(Serbia)	CB	18 February 1999 (age 27)	Youth system	
15	Svetozar Marković	(Serbia)	CB	23 March 2000 (age 26)	Youth system	
23	Bojan Ostojić	(Serbia)	CB	12 February 1984 (age 42)	(Serbia) Čukarički	
26	Nemanja G. Miletić	(Serbia)	LB	26 July 1991 (age 35)	(Serbia) Javor Ivanjica	
30	Milan Mitrović	(Serbia)	CB	2 July 1988 (age 38)	(Turkey) Mersin İdmanyurdu	
33	Nemanja Antonov	(Serbia)	LB	6 June 1995 (age 31)	(Switzerland) Grasshopper	Loan
72	Slobodan Urošević	(Serbia)	LB	15 April 1994 (age 32)	(Serbia) Napredak Kruševac	
73	Nemanja R. Miletić	(Serbia)	CB / RB	16 January 1991 (age 26)	(Belgium) Westerlo	
Midfielders
7	Zoran Tošić	(Serbia)	AM / LW / RW	28 April 1987 (age 39)	(Russia) CSKA Moscow	
10	Marko Janković	(Montenegro)	RW	9 July 1995 (age 31)	(Greece) Olympiacos	
14	Yuriy Vakulko	(Ukraine)	DM	10 November 1997 (age 28)	(Ukraine) Dnipro	
16	Saša Zdjelar	(Serbia)	DM	20 March 1995 (age 31)	(Greece) Olympiacos	Loan
20	Seydouba Soumah	(Guinea)	AM	11 July 1991 (age 35)	(Slovakia) Slovan Bratislava	
21	Marko Jevtović	(Serbia)	DM	24 July 1993 (age 33)	(Serbia) Novi Pazar	
22	Saša Ilić	(Serbia)	CM / AM	30 December 1977 (age 48)	(Austria) Red Bull Salzburg	Captain
27	Nebojša Kosović	(Montenegro)	CM / AM	24 February 1995 (age 31)	(Belgium) Standard Liège	
34	Dramane Salou	(Burkina Faso)	DM	22 May 1998 (age 28)	(Burkina Faso) Salitas	
44	Armin Đerlek	(Serbia)	AM	15 July 2000 (age 26)	(Serbia) OFK Beograd	
55	Danilo Pantić	(Serbia)	LM / AM / CM	26 October 1996 (age 29)	(England) Chelsea	Loan
90	Strahinja Jovanović	(Serbia)	AM	1 June 1999 (age 27)	(Serbia) Teleoptik	
Forwards
3	Léandre Tawamba	(Cameroon)	ST / CF / AM	20 December 1989 (age 36)	(Kazakhstan) Kairat	
8	Vladimir Đilas	(Serbia)	ST	3 March 1983 (age 43)	(Bosnia and Herzegovina) Borac Banja Luka	
18	Đorđe Ivanović	(Serbia)	ST / CF	20 November 1995 (age 30)	(Serbia) Spartak Subotica	
51	Ognjen Ožegović	(Serbia)	ST / CF	9 June 1994 (age 32)	(Serbia) Čukarički	
99	Đorđe Jovanović	(Serbia)	ST / CF	15 February 1999 (age 17)	Youth system	

== Friendlies ==
18 June 2017 Friendly	Partizan (Serbia)	0–1	(Montenegro) Zeta	Zlatibor, Serbia
18:00		Report (in Serbian)	Adžović 73'	Stadium: Švajcarija stadium Referee: Milan Kurlagić (Serbia)

22 June 2017 Friendly	Mladost Lučani (Serbia)	1–0	(Serbia) Partizan	Lučani, Serbia
11:00	Marković 53' (pen.)	Report (in Serbian)		Stadium: Mladost Stadium; Referee: Dragan Čolović (Serbia)

27 June 2017 Friendly	Partizan (Serbia)	2–0	(Austria) SV Kapfenberg	Gornja Radgona, Slovenia
18:00	Đuričković 56'; Đilas 58'	Report (in Serbian)		Stadium: Stadium in Gornja Radgona; Attendance: 100; Referee: Slavko Nemet (Slovenia)

29 June 2017 Friendly	Partizan (Serbia)	3–2	(Denmark) Copenhagen	Odranci, Slovenia
18:00	Jovanović 14' 50'; Pantić 77'	Report (in Serbian)	Kvist 23'; Verbič 70'	Stadium: Stadium in Odranci; Attendance: 1,000; Referee: Miran Bukovec (Slovenia)

1 July 2017 Friendly	CSKA Moscow (Russia)	3–0	(Serbia) Partizan	Wildon, Austria
17:00	Kuchayev 17'; Vitinho 30'; Chalov 85'	Report (in Serbian)		Stadium: Stadium in Wildon; Attendance: 300; Referee: Rene Eisner (Austria)

4 July 2017 Friendly	Partizan (Serbia)	1–0	(Russia) Ural Yekaterinburg	Beltinci, Slovenia
18:00	Đurđević 88' (pen.)	Report (in Serbian)		Stadium: Stadium športni park Beltinci; Attendance: 200; Referee: Andrej Tratnjek (Slovenia)

2 September 2017 Friendly	Partizan (Serbia)	2–0	(Serbia) Mačva Šabac	Belgrade, Serbia
	Solomon 5'; Antonov 60'			Stadium: SC Partizan-Teleoptik

23 January 2018 Friendly	Partizan (Serbia)	3–0	(Serbia) Teleoptik	Belgrade, Serbia
11:00	Jovanović 17' 36'; Cucin 61'	Report (in Serbian)		Stadium: Zemunelo; Referee: Dušan Krstić (Serbia)

27 January 2018 Friendly	Partizan (Serbia)	0–0	(Poland) Górnik Zabrze	Pyrgos, Limassol
14:00		Report (in Serbian)		Stadium: Pyrgos Stadium; Referee: Jan Machálek (Czech Republic)

29 January 2018 Friendly	Partizan (Serbia)	1–2	(Czech Republic) Slovan Liberec	Agios Tychonas, Cyprus
14:00	Tawamba 88'	Report (in Serbian)	Kerbr 6'; Graiciar 77'	Stadium: Agios Tychonas Stadium; Referee: Jiří Houdek (Czech Republic)

1 February 2018 Friendly	Partizan (Serbia)	4–0	(Cyprus) Ermis	Larnaca, Cyprus
14:00	Soumah 19'; Đerlek 54'; Đilas 75'; Jovanović 90'	Report (in Serbian)		Stadium: GSZ Stadium; Referee: Lerch Ondrej (Czech Republic)

3 February 2018 Friendly	Partizan (Serbia)	2–0	(Czech Republic) Teplice	Pyrgos, Limassol
15:00	Ivanović 55'; Tawamba 79'	Report (in Serbian)		Stadium: Pyrgos Stadium; Attendance: Savvas Nicolau (Cyprus)

6 February 2018 Friendly	Partizan (Serbia)	0–1	(Latvia) Liepāja	Agios Tychonas, Cyprus
14:35		Report (in Serbian)	Karašausks 39'	Stadium: Agios Tychonas Stadium; Referee: Marios Christofi (Cyprus)

8 February 2018 Friendly	Partizan (Serbia)	2–1	(Belarus) Shakhtyor Soligorsk	Larnaca, Cyprus
14:30	Tawamba 49'; Đerlek 83'	Report (in Serbian)	Miletić 68' (o.g.)	Stadium: GSZ Stadium; Referee: Georgiu Marios (Cyprus)

24 March 2018 Friendly	Radnik Bijeljina (Bosnia and Herzegovina)	0–1	(Serbia) Partizan	Bijeljina, Bosnia and Herzegovina
15:30		Report (in Serbian)	Ivanović 57'	Stadium: Gradski stadion Attendance: 3,500; Referee: Rajko Đorđić (Bosnia and Herzegovina)

== Competitions ==
=== Overview ===
Competition	Record							
Competition	P	W	D	L	GF	GA	GD	Win %
Serbian SuperLiga	37	23	8	6	71	33	+38	62.16
Serbian Cup	6	5	0	1	14	5	+9	83.33
UEFA Europa League	14	4	6	4	18	17	+1	28.57
Total	57	32	14	11	103	55	+48	56.14

==== Regular season ====
===== League table =====
Pos	Team	Pld	W	D	L	GF	GA	GD	Pts	Qualification
1	Red Star Belgrade	30	25	4	1	75	15	+60	77 (Note: Red Star were deducted two points.)	Qualification for the Championship round
2	Partizan	30	20	7	3	59	23	+36	65 (Note: Partizan were deducted two points.)	Qualification for the Championship round
3	Čukarički	30	14	9	7	43	26	+17	51	Qualification for the Championship round
4	Radnički Niš	30	14	8	8	46	40	+6	50	Qualification for the Championship round
5	Spartak Subotica	30	14	7	9	55	39	+16	49	Qualification for the Championship round

Source: SuperLiga (in Serbian), Soccerway
Rules for classification: 1) Points; 2) Head-to-head points; 3) Head-to-head goal difference; 4) Head-to-head goals scored; 5) Head-to-head away goals scored (if two teams tied); 6) Goal difference; 7) Goals scored; 8) Fair play ranking; 9) Draw.

===== Results =====
22 July 2017 1	Partizan	6–1	Mačva Šabac	Belgrade
19:00 CET	Kosović 8'; Tawamba 16' 68'; Pantić 20'; Đurđević 35'; Jevtović (yellow card) 41'; Mihajlović 85'	Report	Pejović (yellow card) 37'; Lazarević 59' (pen.)	Stadium: Partizan Stadium; Attendance: 4,000; Referee: (Serbia) Danilo Grujić

29 July 2017 2	Partizan	2–1	Javor Ivanjica	Belgrade
19:00 CET	Đurđević 35'; Kosović (yellow card) 45+1'; Jovanović (yellow card) 78'; Soumah 85'; Radin (yellow card) 90'	Report	Karišik (yellow card) 69'; Ristovski (yellow card) 74'; Eliomar (yellow card) 84'; Milović 89'	Stadium: Partizan Stadium; Attendance: 4,000; Referee: (Serbia) Milan Ilić

6 August 2017 3	Spartak Subotica	0–1	Partizan	Subotica
19:00 CET	Ćalasan (yellow card) 73'	Report	Tawamba 30'	Stadium: Subotica City Stadium; Attendance: 5,000; Referee: (Serbia) Srđan Jovanović

9 August 2017 4	Partizan	1–3	Voždovac	Belgrade
20:00 CET	Đurđević 7' (pen.); Radin (yellow card) 76'	Report	Ivković (yellow card) 7'; Stuparević 8'; Duronjić 38'; Srećković (yellow card) 74'; Ješić 88'	Stadium: Partizan Stadium; Attendance: 4,000; Referee: (Serbia) Aleksandar Vasić

13 August 2017 5	Vojvodina	0–1	Partizan	Novi Sad
19:00 CET	Renan (yellow card) 68'	Report	Jevtović (yellow card) 81'; Ostojić 89'; Radin (yellow card) 90+2'	Stadium: Karađorđe Stadium; Attendance: 7,000; Referee: (Serbia) Milorad Mažić

20 September 2017* 6	Partizan	1–1	Napredak Kruševac	Belgrade
19:00 CET	Đuričković (yellow card) 73'; Miletić (yellow card) 89'; Everton 90+6'	Report	Markoski (yellow card) 23'; Boranijašević (yellow card) 27' (yellow-red card) 27'; Alivodić 43'; Vulić (yellow card) 59'; Petrović (yellow card) 73'; Petrović (yellow card) 90+2'	Stadium: Partizan Stadium; Attendance: 2,000; Referee: (Serbia) Novica Anđelovski

27 August 2017 7	Red Star	0–0	Partizan	Belgrade
19:00 CET	Donald (yellow card) 38'; Gobeljić (yellow card) 70'	Report	Everton (yellow card) 2'; Janković (yellow card) 22'; Radin (yellow card) 48'; Đurđević (yellow card) 70'; Miletić (yellow card) 90+1'	Stadium: Rajko Mitić Stadium; Attendance: 33,000; Referee: (Serbia) Danilo Grujić

9 September 2017 8	Partizan	3–0	Mladost Lučani	Belgrade
21:00 CET	Miletić 53'; Pantić 62'; Tawamba 70'	Report	Pavlović (yellow card) 41'; Tumbasević (yellow card) 80'	Stadium: Partizan Stadium; Attendance: 5,000; Referee: (Serbia) Ilija Brdar

25 October 2017* 9	Zemun	1–3	Partizan	Belgrade
15:00 CET	Mitrović 45+1' (o.g.); Lasickas (yellow card) 59'; Božović (yellow card) 67'; Đalović (yellow card) 76'	Report	Mitrović 25'; Tawamba (yellow card) 71'; Ožegović 86' (yellow card) 86'; Jevtović 90+1' (pen.)	Stadium: Zemun Stadium; Attendance: 2,500; Referee: (Serbia) Petar Piper

17 September 2017 10	Partizan	3–1	Radnički Niš	Belgrade
19:00 CET	Tawamba (yellow card) 15'; Tošić 32'; Janković 45+1'; Ožegović 72'; Đuričković (yellow card) 85'	Report	Noma (yellow card) 57'; Pavkov 59'; Raspopović (yellow card) 63'; Arsić (yellow card) 79'	Stadium: Partizan Stadium; Attendance: 3,000; Referee: (Serbia) Zoran Široki

24 September 2017 11	Rad	2–4	Partizan	Belgrade
19:00 CET	Zonjić 48'; Vujačić 54' (yellow card) 82'	Report	Ožegović 15'; Mitrović 28'; Jovanović 79' (yellow card) 79'; Miletić (yellow card) 82'; Tawamba 88'	Stadium: King Peter I Stadium; Attendance: 1,500; Referee: (Serbia) Milorad Mažić

1 October 2017 12	Partizan	0–0	Čukarički	Belgrade
19:00 CET	Đuričković (yellow card) 39'; Everton (yellow card) 79'	Report	Puškarić (yellow card) 83'; Jovanović (yellow card) 84'	Stadium: Partizan Stadium; Attendance: 3,000; Referee: (Serbia) Srđan Jovanović

15 October 2017 13	Radnik Surdulica	0–2	Partizan	Surdulica
15:00 CET	Tanasin (yellow card) 18'; Kyeremeh (yellow card) 44'; Žakula (yellow card) 45'; Ivanović (yellow card) 48'; Žakula (yellow card) 45'; Radović (yellow card) 52'; Pantelić (yellow card) 63'; Pejčić (yellow card) 89'	Report	Soumah 19' (pen.) (yellow card) 41'; Stojković (yellow card) 48'; Everton (yellow card) 63'; Tošić 89' (pen.)	Stadium: Surdulica City Stadium; Attendance: 3,000; Referee: (Serbia) Lazar Lukić

22 October 2017 14	Partizan	3–1	Bačka	Belgrade
15:00 CET	Jevtović 7' (pen.); Ožegović 14'; Tawamba 90+2'	Report	Mićić 21'	Stadium: Partizan Stadium; Attendance: 2,400; Referee: (Serbia) Dejan Santrač

29 October 2017 15	Borac Čačak	1–2	Partizan	Čačak
17:00 CET	Obradović (yellow card) 14'; Mateus (yellow card) 48' (goal) 70'; Čađenović (yellow card) 88'; Jovanović (yellow card) 90+1'; Knežević (yellow card) 90+6'	Report	Tawamba 59'; Tošić 90+6'	Stadium: Čačak Stadium; Attendance: 1,000; Referee: (Serbia) Novica Anđelovski

5 November 2017 16	Mačva Šabac	1–3	Partizan	Šabac
13:00 CET	Matić (yellow card) 4'; Lazarević 37'; Ivić (yellow card) 42'; Lazarević (yellow card) 56'; Adamović (yellow card) 73'; Gavrić (yellow card) 84'	Report	Everton (yellow card) 35'; Tawamba 54'; Mitrović (yellow card) 81'; Ilić 85' (pen.); Stojković (yellow card) 87'; Jovanović 89'	Stadium: Gradski stadion Šabac; Attendance: 8,000; Referee: (Serbia) Nenad Đokić

19 November 2017 17	Javor	0–2	Partizan	Ivanjica
13:00 CET		Report	Janković 9', 37'; Jevtović (yellow card) 18'	Stadium: Ivanjica Stadium; Attendance: 1,000; Referee: (Serbia) Bojan Nikolić

26 November 2017 18	Partizan	1–1	Spartak Subotica	Belgrade
17:00 CET	Tošić 48'	Report	Stojković (yellow card) 65'; Nikolić 72'; Ivanović (yellow card) 90'; Ostojić (yellow card) 90+1'	Stadium: Partizan Stadium; Attendance: 2,000; Referee: (Serbia) Jovan Šegrt

29 November 2017 19	Voždovac	0–1	Partizan	Belgrade
17:00 CET	Luković (yellow card) 63'; Pavlović (yellow card) 85' (red card) 85'	Report	Tošić 26'; Jevtović (yellow card) 76'; Stojković (yellow card) 89'	Stadium: Voždovac Stadium; Attendance: 1,100; Referee: (Serbia) Aleksandar Vasić

3 December 2017 20	Partizan	1–1	Vojvodina	Belgrade
17:00 CET	Mitrović (yellow card) 38'; Tošić 48'	Report	Jovančić (yellow card) 81'; Kojašević 86'	Stadium: Partizan Stadium; Attendance: 3,000; Referee: (Serbia) Zoran Široki

10 December 2017 21	Napredak Kruševac	2–1	Partizan	Kruševac
15:00 CET	Vukanović 34'; Đerić 54'; Petrović (yellow card) 75'	Report	Jevtović 60' (pen.); Miletić (yellow card) 83'	Stadium: Mladost Stadium; Attendance: 3,000; Referee: (Serbia) Milorad Mažić

13 December 2017 22	Partizan	1–1	Crvena zvezda	Belgrade
19:00 CET	Tawamba (yellow card) 5'; Vulićević (yellow card) 14'; Ostojić (yellow card) 35'; Soumah 61' (pen.); Everton (yellow card) 75'	Report	Savić (yellow card) 27'; Stojković (yellow card) 51'; Donald (yellow card) 75'; Boakye 84'	Stadium: Partizan Stadium; Attendance: 14,874; Referee: (Serbia) Milorad Mažić

18 February 2018 23	Mladost Lučani	1–2	Partizan	Lučani
14:00 CET	Tumbasević (yellow card) 45+1' (yellow-red card) 84'; Šatara (yellow card) 52'; Pavlović 70'; Jovanović (yellow card) 87' (yellow-red card) 88'; Milošević (yellow card) 90+2'; Pešić (yellow card) 90+3'	Report	Pantić (yellow card) 80'; Jevtović 86'; Šatara 89' (o.g.)	Stadium: Mladost Stadium; Attendance: 2,000; Referee: (Serbia) Aleksandar Vasić

24 February 2018 24	Partizan	1–1	Zemun	Belgrade
15:00 CET	Tawamba (yellow card) 52'; Zdjelar 90+4'	Report	Trajković (yellow card) 45'; Vučić 70' (pen.); Simić (yellow card) 84'	Stadium: Partizan Stadium; Attendance: 0 Referee: (Serbia) Dejan Santrač

3 March 2018 25	Radnički Niš	1–0	Partizan	Niš
14:30 CET	Pavkov 75'; Šaranov (yellow card) 86'; Stojanović (yellow card) 90+2'	Report	Soumah (yellow card) 34'; Zdjelar (yellow card) 51'; Pantić (yellow card) 71'; Mitrović (yellow card) 71'; Jovanović (yellow card) 90+4'	Stadium: Čair Stadium; Attendance: 3,500; Referee: (Serbia) Zoran Široki

7 March 2018 26	Partizan	3–1	Rad	Belgrade
15:30 CET	Tošić 17'; Ostojić (yellow card) 40'; Zdjelar 70'; Cucin (yellow card) 72'; Janković (yellow card) 79'; Tawamba 88'	Report	Marinković (yellow card) 6'; Volkov 40' (pen.) (yellow card) 57'	Stadium: Partizan Stadium; Attendance: 0 Referee: (Serbia) Igor Stojilković

11 March 2018 27	Čukarički	0–2	Partizan	Belgrade
15:00 CET	Bogosavac (yellow card) 49'; Fofana (yellow card) 76'; Mudrinski (yellow card) 79'; Đurić (yellow card) 87'	Report	Tawamba 20'; Ožegović 23'; Zdjelar (yellow card) 53'; Jevtović (yellow card) 80'	Stadium: Čukarički Stadium; Attendance: 2,500; Referee: (Serbia) Srđan Jovanović

18 March 2018 28	Partizan	2–0	Radnik Surdulica	Belgrade
13:00 CET	Ožegović (yellow card) 45+2'; Jevtović 64' (pen.); Miletić 65'	Report	Žakula (yellow card) 55'; Radović (yellow card) 63'	Stadium: Partizan Stadium; Attendance: 3,000; Referee: (Serbia) Ilija Brdar

31 March 2018 29	Bačka	1–2	Partizan	Bačka Palanka
15:30 CET	Đorić (yellow card) 33'; Mićić 84'	Report	Ožegović 4' (pen.); Pantić (yellow card) 45+5'; Vulićević (yellow card) 59'; Tawamba 78'; N.G. Miletić (yellow card) 79'; Stojković (yellow card) 87'	Stadium: Stadion Slavko Maletin Vava; Attendance: 2,500; Referee: (Serbia) Petar Piper

5 April 2018 30	Partizan	5–0	Borac Čačak	Belgrade
17:00 CET	Ožegović 9' 54' (pen.); Marković 38'; Pantić 62'; Tošić 72'	Report		Stadium: Partizan Stadium; Attendance: 3,700; Referee: (Serbia) Majo Vujović

==== Championship round ====
Pos	Team	Pld	W	D	L	GF	GA	GD	Pts	Qualification
1	Red Star Belgrade (C)	37	32	4	1	96	19	+77	60	Qualification for the Champions League first qualifying round
2	Partizan	37	23	8	6	71	33	+38	43	Qualification for the Europa League first qualifying round (Note: Since the winners of the 2017–18 Serbian Cup, Partizan, qualified for European competition based on league position, the spot awarded to the cup winners (Europa League first qualifying round) was passed to the fourth-placed team.)
3	Radnički Niš	37	18	8	11	63	51	+12	37 (Note: Radnički Niš finished ahead of Spartak Subotica on regular season points: Radnički 50 pts, Spartak 49 pts.)	Qualification for the Europa League first qualifying round
4	Spartak Subotica	37	18	7	12	62	49	+13	37	Qualification for the Europa League first qualifying round
5	Voždovac	37	16	8	13	48	42	+6	33	
6	Čukarički	37	16	9	12	54	44	+10	32	
7	Napredak Kruševac	37	15	8	14	57	55	+2	30	
8	Vojvodina	37	14	8	15	43	43	0	28	

Source: UEFA, Soccerway
Rules for classification: 1) Points; 2) Points in regular season; 3) Head-to-head points in regular season; 4) Head-to-head goal difference in regular season; 5) Head-to-head goals scored in regular season; 6) Head-to-head away goals scored in regular season (if two teams tied); 7) Goal difference; 8) Goals scored; 9) Fair play ranking; 10) Play-off (if two teams tied and need to decide champion or teams for UEFA competitions); 11) Drawing of lots.
(C) Champions

===== Results =====
14 April 2018 31	Red Star	2–1	Partizan	Belgrade
18:30 CET	Radonjić 18' (yellow card) 20'; Babić (yellow card) 57'; Pešić (yellow card) 78'; Stojković (yellow card) 86'; Jovičić (yellow card) 90+1'; Donald (yellow card) 90+6' (red card) 90+9'; Borjan (yellow card) 90+9'	Report	Ožegović (yellow card) 57' (goal) 90+8' (pen.); Marković (yellow card) 61'; Janković (yellow card) 86'; Soumah (red card) 90+9'	Stadium: Red Star Stadium; Attendance: 35,131; Referee: (Serbia) Danilo Grujić

21 April 2018 32	Partizan	2–1	Čukarički	Belgrade
19:00 CET	Tošić 18' 81'; Jevtović (yellow card) 64'	Report	Belaković 46'; Stevanović (yellow card) 76'; Đurić (yellow card) 83'	Stadium: Partizan Stadium; Attendance: 2,500; Referee: (Serbia) Aleksandar Vasić

24 April 2018 33	Partizan	3–1	Radnički Niš	Belgrade
18:00 CET	Ivanović 16' 44'; Tošić 57'; Đerlek (yellow card) 90'	Report	Pavkov 13'	Stadium: Partizan Stadium; Attendance: 2,000; Referee: (Serbia) Dalibor Manojlović

29 April 2018 34	Vojvodina	2–1	Partizan	Novi Sad
18:30 CET	Jovančić 11' (yellow card) 84'; Lazarević (yellow card) 45'; Radovanović 76' (yellow card) 84'	Report	Janković 26' (yellow card) 27'; Zdjelar (yellow card) 83' (red card)	Stadium: Karađorđe Stadium; Attendance: 4,270; Referee: (Serbia) Milorad Mažić

5 May 2018 35	Partizan	2–2	Napredak Kruševac	Belgrade
18:00 CET	Pantić (yellow card) 3'; Ilić (yellow card) 25'; Jevtović (yellow card) 40' (yellow-red card) 79'; Jovanović 59' 62'	Report	Sekidika 12'; Vulić 13'; Šljivić (yellow card) 25'; Petrović (yellow card) 31'; Vukanović (yellow card) 52'; Eskić (yellow card) 72'; Veškovac (yellow card) 76'	Stadium: Partizan Stadium; Attendance: 1,500; Referee: (Serbia) Ilija Brdar

13 May 2018 36	Voždovac	2–1	Partizan	Belgrade
19:00 CET	Zlatković (yellow card) 69'; Luković 76' (pen.); Mašović 78'	Report	Vakulko (yellow card) 27'; Jevtović 52' (pen.); Urošević (yellow card) 76'	Stadium: Voždovac Stadium; Attendance: 0 Referee: (Serbia) Petar Piper

17 May 2018 37	Partizan	2–0	Spartak Subotica	Belgrade
19:00 CET	Pantić 3'; Tawamba 28'	Report		Stadium: Partizan Stadium; Attendance: 2,000; Referee: (Serbia) Dragan Čolović

=== Serbian Cup ===
11 October 2017 First round	Rtanj	0–3	Partizan	Boljevac
14:00 CET	Mašić (yellow card) 56'; Đoković (yellow card) 70'	Report	Tawamba 35'; Đuričković (yellow card) 45'; Ostojić (yellow card) 61'; Jevtović 70' (pen.); Ožegović 86'	Stadium: Boljevac Stadium; Attendance: 5,000; Referee: (Serbia) Milan Ilić

15 November 2017 Second round	Partizan	3–0	Rad	Belgrade
18:30 CET	Tošić 61', 68'; Janković 80'	Report		Stadium: Partizan Stadium; Attendance: 1,000; Referee: (Serbia) Petar Piper

14 March 2018 Quarterfinals	Javor Ivanjica	0–2	Partizan	Ivanjica
13:00 CET	Amanović (yellow card) 30'; Cornelius (yellow card) 39'; Crnomarković (yellow card) 62'; Karišik (yellow card) 74'	Report	Zdjelar (yellow card) 35'; Ožegović 65' (yellow card) 74'; Miletić 67' (yellow card) 88'	Stadium: Ivanjica Stadium; Attendance: 1,500; Referee: (Serbia) Srđan Jovanović

18 April 2018 Semifinals 1st leg	Čukarički	4–2	Partizan	Belgrade
18:30 CET	Bojić 2', 55'; Kajević 40'; Docić (yellow card) 83'; Milić (yellow card) 86'; Mudrinski 90+2'	Report	Radić 20' (o.g.); Pantić 44' (yellow card) 57'	Stadium: Čukarički Stadium; Attendance: 3,000; Referee: (Serbia) Petar Piper

9 May 2018 Semifinals 2nd leg	Partizan	2–0 (4–4 agg.)	Čukarički	Belgrade
20:00 CET	Antonov 66'; Ivanović (yellow card) 80'; Ilić 90'	Report	Stojanović (yellow card) 76'; Đurić (yellow card) 83'; Veličković (yellow card) 89'	Stadium: Partizan Stadium; Attendance: 15,000; Referee: (Serbia) Milorad Mažić

23 May 2018 Final	Mladost Lučani	1–2	Partizan	Surdulica
19:00 CET	Tumbasević 21'; Jovanović (yellow card) 25'; Milošević (yellow card) 33'; Milošević (yellow card) 47'; Radivojević (yellow card) 58'; Pešić (yellow card) 64'; Pejović (yellow card) 90+3' (yellow-red card)	Report	Janković 31'; Zdjelar 62'; Jevtović (yellow card) 86'	Stadium: City Stadium; Attendance: 3,500; Referee: (Serbia) Majo Vujović

=== UEFA Champions League ===
==== Second qualifying round ====
11 July 2017 QR2	Partizan (Serbia)	2–0	(Montenegro) Budućnost Podgorica	Belgrade, Serbia
20:45 CET	Đurđević 53' (pen.); Leonardo 63'; Đuričković (yellow card) 84'	Report	Mirković (yellow card) 53'; Simović (yellow card) 67'; Melunović (yellow card) 79'	Stadium: Partizan Stadium; Attendance: 20,530; Referee: Pol van Boekel (Netherlands)

18 July 2017 QR2	Budućnost Podgorica (Montenegro)	0–0 (0–2 agg.)	(Serbia) Partizan	Podgorica, Montenegro
20:45 CET	Mirković (yellow card) 42'; Raspopović (yellow card) 48'; Hočko (yellow card) 87'	Report	Kosović (yellow card) 39'; Everton (yellow card) 59'	Stadium: Podgorica City Stadium; Attendance: 9,153; Referee: Roi Reinshreiber (Israel)

==== Third qualifying round ====
25 July 2017 QR3	Partizan (Serbia)	1–3	(Greece) Olympiacos	Belgrade, Serbia
20:45 CET	Tawamba 10' (yellow card) 69'; Everton (yellow card) 64'; Leonardo (yellow card) 88'	Report	Siopis (yellow card) 4'; Ben Nabouhane 6', 56'; Romao (yellow card) 46'; Figueiras (yellow card) 77'; Emenike 90+1'	Stadium: Partizan Stadium; Attendance: 24,658; Referee: Davide Massa (Italy)

2 August 2017 QR3	Olympiacos (Greece)	2–2 (5–3 agg.)	(Serbia) Partizan	Piraeus, Greece
20:45 CET	Carcela 22'; Odjidja-Ofoe (yellow card) 50'; Fortounis 51'; Retsos (yellow card) 90+2'	Report	Jevtović (yellow card) 21'; Soumah 33'; Janković (yellow card) 45'; Tawamba (yellow card) 68'; Đurđević 85'; Kosović (yellow card) 90+5'	Stadium: Karaiskakis Stadium; Attendance: 23,854; Referee: Xavier Estrada Fernández (Spain)

=== UEFA Europa League ===
==== Play-off round ====
17 August 2017 Play-off round	Partizan (Serbia)	0–0	(Hungary) Videoton	Belgrade, Serbia
21:00	Ostojić (yellow card) 3'; Radin (yellow card) 20'	Report	Pátkai (yellow card) 25'; Henty (yellow card) 46'; Fiola (yellow card) 52'; Szolnoki (yellow card) 56'	Stadium: Partizan Stadium; Attendance: 0 Referee: John Beaton (Scotland)

24 August 2017 Play-off round	Videoton (Hungary)	0–4 (0–4 agg.)	(Serbia) Partizan	Felcsút, Hungary
20:00	Juhász (yellow card) 44' (yellow-red card) 47'; Pátkai (yellow card) 55'; Fiola (yellow card) 85'	Report	Tawamba 6'; Soumah 24'; Ostojić (yellow card) 27'; Đurđević 35', 87'; Everton Luiz (yellow card) 81'	Stadium: Pancho Aréna; Attendance: 3,485; Referee: Andre Marriner (England)

==== Group stage ====
Pos	Team	Pld	W	D	L	GF	GA	GD	Pts	Qualification
1	(Ukraine) Dynamo Kyiv	6	4	1	1	15	9	+6	13	Advance to knockout phase
2	(Serbia) Partizan	6	2	2	2	8	9	−1	8	Advance to knockout phase
3	(Switzerland) Young Boys	6	1	3	2	7	8	−1	6	
4	(Albania) Skënderbeu	6	1	2	3	6	10	−4	5	

Source: UEFA
Rules for classification: Group stage tiebreakers

==== Results ====
14 September 2017 1	Young Boys (Switzerland)	1–1	(Serbia) Partizan	Bern, Switzerland
19:00 CET	Fassnacht 14' (yellow card) 77'; Sow (yellow card) 42'	Report	Janković 11'; Ostojić (yellow card) 36'; Ožegović (yellow card) 50'; Tošič (yellow card) 56'	Stadium: Stade de Suisse; Attendance: 13,004; Referee: István Kovács (Romania)

28 September 2017 2	Partizan (Serbia)	2–3	(Ukraine) Dynamo Kyiv	Belgrade, Serbia
21:05 CET	Ožegović 34' (yellow card) 53'; Tawamba 42' (yellow card) 83'; Janković (yellow card) 47'; Everton Luiz (yellow card) 63'	Report	Kravets (yellow card) 29'; Júnior Moraes 54' (pen.), 84'; Buyalskyi 68' (yellow card) 79'	Stadium: Partizan Stadium; Attendance: 0 Referee: Svein Oddvar Moen (Norway)

19 October 2017 3	Skënderbeu Korçë (Albania)	0–0	(Serbia) Partizan	Elbasan, Albania
21:05 CET	Lilaj (yellow card) 38'; Jashanica (yellow card) 60'; Mici (yellow card) 90+3'	Report	Tawamba (yellow card) 34'; Miletić (yellow card) 62'; Tošić (yellow card) 90+3'	Stadium: Elbasan Arena; Attendance: 6,300; Referee: Daniel Stefański (Poland)

2 November 2017 4	Partizan (Serbia)	2–0	(Albania) Skënderbeu Korçë	Belgrade, Serbia
19:00 CET	Tošić 39' (yellow card) 52'; Jevtović (yellow card) 44'; Tawamba 66'; Miletić (yellow card) 71'	Report	Jashanica (yellow card) 65'	Stadium: Partizan Stadium; Attendance: 12,659; Referee: Carlos del Cerro Grande (Spain)

23 November 2017 5	Partizan (Serbia)	2–1	(Switzerland) Young Boys	Belgrade, Serbia
21:05 CET	Tawamba 12'; Mitrović (yellow card) 33'; Ožegović 53'; Everton Luiz (yellow card) 81'; Miletić (yellow card) 88'; Vulićević (yellow card) 90+1'	Report	Ngamaleu 25'; Assalé (yellow card) 63'	Stadium: Partizan Stadium; Attendance: 20,568; Referee: Tamás Bognár (Hungary)

7 December 2017 6	Dynamo Kyiv (Ukraine)	4–1	(Serbia) Partizan	Kyiv, Ukraine
19:00 CET	Morozyuk 6', (yellow card) 62'; Moraes 28', 31', 77' (pen.); Shepelyev (yellow card) 90+1'	Report	Everton Luiz (yellow card) 40'; Jevtović 45+4' (pen.); Miletić (yellow card) 48'; Đuričković (yellow card) 89'	Stadium: NSC Olimpiyskiy Stadium; Attendance: 14,678; Referee: Pawel Gil (Poland)

==== Round of 32 ====
15 February 2018 First Leg	Partizan (Serbia)	1–1	(Czech Republic) Viktoria Plzeň	Belgrade, Serbia
21:05 CET	Mitrović (yellow card) 53' (yellow-red card) 85'; Tawamba 58'	Report	Řezník 81'; Hrošovský (yellow card) 85'	Stadium: Partizan Stadium; Attendance: 21,568; Referee: Tasos Sidiropoulos (Greece)

22 February 2018 Second Leg	Viktoria Plzeň (Czech Republic)	2–0 (3–1 agg.)	(Serbia) Partizan	Plzeň, Czech Republic
19:00 CET	Krmenčík 67'; Čermák 90+5'	Report	Pantić (yellow card) 73'; Tošić (yellow card) 88'	Stadium: Doosan Arena; Attendance: 10,185; Referee: Jakob Kehlet (Denmark)

== Statistics ==
=== Goalscorers ===
Rank	No.	Pos	Nat	Name	SuperLiga	Serbian Cup	Europe	Total
1	3	FW	(Cameroon)	Léandre Tawamba	12	1	6	19
2	51	FW	(Serbia)	Ognjen Ožegović	10	2	2	14
2	7	MF	(Serbia)	Zoran Tošić	11	2	1	14
3	21	MF	(Serbia)	Marko Jevtović	6	1	1	8
4	32	FW	(Serbia)	Uroš Đurđević	3	0	4	7
4	10	MF	(Montenegro)	Marko Janković	4	2	1	7
6	20	MF	(Guinea)	Seydouba Soumah	3	0	2	5
6	55	MF	(Serbia)	Danilo Pantić	4	1	0	5
7	99	FW	(Serbia)	Đorđe Jovanović	4	0	0	4
8	16	MF	(Serbia)	Saša Zdjelar	2	1	0	3
9	30	DF	(Serbia)	Milan Mitrović	2	0	0	2
9	26	DF	(Serbia)	Nemanja G.Miletić	2	0	0	2
9	18	DF	(Serbia)	Đorđe Ivanović	2	0	0	2
9	22	MF	(Serbia)	Saša Ilić	1	1	0	2
10
10	23	DF	(Serbia)	Bojan Ostojić	1	0	0	1
10	42	MF	(Brazil)	Leonardo	0	0	1	1
10	25	MF	(Brazil)	Everton Luiz	1	0	0	1
10	26	MF	(Montenegro)	Nebojša Kosović	1	0	0	1
10	7	MF	(Serbia)	Nemanja Mihajlović	1	0	0	1
10	73	DF	(Serbia)	Nemanja R.Miletić	0	1	0	1
10	15	DF	(Serbia)	Svetozar Marković	1	0	0	1
10	33	DF	(Serbia)	Nemanja Antonov	0	1	0	1
Totals					71	13	18	103

Last updated: 23 May 2018

=== Clean sheets ===
Rank	No.	Pos	Nat	Name	SuperLiga	Serbian Cup	Europe	Total
1	88	GK	(Serbia)	Vladimir Stojković	9	1	4	14
2	61	GK	(Serbia)	Marko Jovičić	2	3	0	5
3	12	GK	(Serbia)	Filip Kljajić	1	0	2	3
Totals					12	4	6	22

Last updated: 17 May 2018

=== Disciplinary record ===
Number	Nation	Position	Name	SuperLiga		Serbian Cup		Europa League		Total	
Number	Nation	Position	Name	Booked	Sent off (straight red)	Booked	Sent off (straight red)	Booked	Sent off (straight red)	Booked	Sent off (straight red)
2	(Serbia)	DF	Luka Cucin	1	0	0	0	0	0	1	0
3	(Cameroon)	FW	Léandre Tawamba	4	0	0	0	4	0	8	0
4	(Serbia)	DF	Miroslav Vulićević	2	0	0	0	1	0	3	0
7	(Serbia)	MF	Zoran Tošić	0	0	0	0	4	0	4	0
10	(Montenegro)	MF	Marko Janković	4	0	0	0	2	0	6	0
11	(Serbia)	MF	Petar Đuričković*	3	0	1	0	2	0	6	0
14	(Ukraine)	MF	Yuriy Vakulko	1	0	0	0	0	0	1	0
15	(Serbia)	MF	Svetozar Marković	1	0	0	0	0	0	1	0
16	(Serbia)	MF	Saša Zdjelar	3	1	1	0	0	0	4	1
18	(Serbia)	MF	Đorđe Ivanović	0	0	1	0	0	0	1	0
20	(Guinea)	MF	Seydouba Soumah	2	1	0	0	0	0	2	1
21	(Serbia)	DF	Marko Jevtović	6	1	1	0	2	0	9	1
22	(Serbia)	MF	Saša Ilić	1	0	0	0	0	0	1	0
23	(Serbia)	DF	Bojan Ostojić	2	0	1	0	3	0	6	0
25	(Brazil)	MF	Everton Luiz*	5	0	0	0	6	0	11	0
26	(Serbia)	DF	Nemanja G.Miletić	4	0	0	0	3	0	7	0
27	(Montenegro)	MF	Nebojša Kosović	1	0	0	0	2	0	3	0
29	(Serbia)	MF	Milan Radin*	4	0	0	0	1	0	5	0
30	(Serbia)	MF	Milan Mitrović	3	0	0	0	3	1	6	1
32	(Serbia)	FW	Uroš Đurđević*	1	0	0	0	0	0	1	0
42	(Brazil)	MF	Leonardo*	0	0	0	0	1	0	1	0
44	(Serbia)	MF	Armin Đerlek	1	0	0	0	0	0	1	0
51	(Serbia)	FW	Ognjen Ožegović	3	0	1	0	1	0	5	0
55	(Serbia)	MF	Danilo Pantić	4	0	1	0	1	0	6	0
72	(Serbia)	MF	Slobodan Urošević	1	0	0	0	0	0	1	0
73	(Serbia)	DF	Nemanja R.Miletić	2	0	1	0	1	0	4	0
88	(Serbia)	GK	Vladimir Stojković	4	0	0	0	0	0	4	0
99	(Serbia)	FW	Đorđe Jovanović	3	0	0	0	0	0	3	0
			TOTALS	66	3	8	0	37	1	111	4

- - They left the team during the season

Last updated: 23 May 2018
