= 2017–18 FK Voždovac season =

Voždovac
2017–18 season
- Chairman: Momir Veljković
- Manager: Ilija Stolica
- Stadium: Voždovac Stadium
- Serbian SuperLiga: 5th
- Serbian Cup: Round of 32
Home colours	Away colours

The 2017–18 FK Voždovac season is the club's 5th straight season in Serbian SuperLiga.

== Current squad ==
As of 17 February 2018

Note: Flags indicate national team as defined under FIFA eligibility rules; some limited exceptions apply. Players may hold more than one non-FIFA nationality.

No.	Pos.	Nation	Player
1	GK	SRB	Stefan Čupić
3	DF	SRB	Nemanja Zlatković
4	DF	SRB	Marko Mirkailo
5	DF	SRB	Marko Gajić
6	MF	BIH	Todor Petrović
7	FW	SRB	Miloš Stanković
8	MF	BIH	Zoran Milutinović
9	FW	SRB	Marko Pavićević
11	FW	MNE	Mihailo Perović
12	GK	MNE	Maksim Milović
14	MF	SRB	Igor Maksimović
15	MF	SRB	Vladan Vidaković
16	MF	SRB	Marko Pavlovski
17	DF	SRB	Miloš Stojanović
18	FW	SRB	Filip Stuparević

No.	Pos.	Nation	Player
19	DF	MNE	Darko Bulatović
20	MF	SRB	Andrija Luković (on loan from Red Star Belgrade)
21	DF	SRB	Miloš Mihajlov (vice-captain)
22	GK	SRB	Marko Knežević
23	MF	SRB	Aleksandar Ješić
25	MF	SRB	Miloš Pavlović (captain)
26	MF	SRB	Nikola Srećković
27	MF	SRB	Nebojša Gavrić
29	FW	SRB	Borko Duronjić
30	FW	SRB	Nikola Ćirković
33	FW	SWE	Andrej Simeunović
36	GK	SRB	Mihailo Karadžić
41	DF	SRB	Mihailo Jovanović
44	FW	SRB	Alen Mašović

=== Youth & reserves ===
Note: Flags indicate national team as defined under FIFA eligibility rules; some limited exceptions apply. Players may hold more than one non-FIFA nationality.

No.	Pos.	Nation	Player
––	MF	SRB	Luka Gojković (on loan from BSK Borča)
––	MF	SRB	David Bajić
––	MF	SRB	Stevan Marinković

No.	Pos.	Nation	Player
––	FW	MNE	Dejan Račić
––		BIH	Aleksa Mrđa

=== Players with multiple nationalities ===
- (Serbia) (Bosnia and Herzegovina) Borko Duronjić
- (Bosnia and Herzegovina) (Serbia) Todor Petrović

=== Out on loan ===
Note: Flags indicate national team as defined under FIFA eligibility rules; some limited exceptions apply. Players may hold more than one non-FIFA nationality.

No.	Pos.	Nation	Player
24	MF	SRB	Stefan Purtić (at Radnički Obrenovac until the end of 2017–18 season)
28	MF	SRB	Jovica Blagojević (at Radnički Obrenovac until the end of 2017–18 season)
—	DF	SRB	Filip Damnjanović (at IMT until the end of 2017–18 season)
—	MF	SRB	Radovan Avram (at GSP Polet Dorćol until the end of 2017–18 season)

No.	Pos.	Nation	Player
—	MF	SRB	Mihailo Oreščanin (at Radnički Obrenovac until the end of 2017–18 season)
—		SRB	Aleksa Stegnjaić (at BSK Borča until the end of 2017–18 season)
—		SRB	Uroš Vuković (at GSP Polet Dorćol until the end of 2017–18 season)

For recent transfers, see List of Serbian football transfers winter 2017–18. For summer transfers, see List of Serbian football transfers summer 2017.

== Friendlies ==
27 June 2017	Voždovac	3–0	(Russia) Orenburg	Stara Pazova, Serbia
18:30	Ješić 26'; Srećković 70'; Ćirković 81'	Report

1 July 2017	Voždovac	2–3	(Russia) Spartak Moscow	Villach, Austria
17:30	Zec 17'; Dražić 42'	Report	Zé Luís 4'; Luiz Adriano 12'; Ananidze 85'

4 July 2017	Voždovac	2–0	(Croatia) Rudeš
	Dražić 22'; Ješić 59'	Report

4 July 2017	Voždovac	0–2	(Croatia) Rudeš
		Report

7 July 2017	Voždovac	1–1	(Ukraine) Zorya Luhansk	Slovenia
17:45	Stuparević 43'	Report	Kocherhin 8'

== Competitions ==
=== Serbian SuperLiga ===
==== Regular season ====
===== League table =====
Pos	Team	Pld	W	D	L	GF	GA	GD	Pts	Qualification
4	Radnički Niš	30	14	8	8	46	40	+6	50	Qualification for the Championship round
5	Spartak Subotica	30	14	7	9	55	39	+16	49	Qualification for the Championship round
6	Voždovac	30	13	8	9	41	29	+12	47	Qualification for the Championship round
7	Napredak Kruševac	30	13	7	10	49	42	+7	46	Qualification for the Championship round
8	Vojvodina	30	12	8	10	33	29	+4	44	Qualification for the Championship round

Source: SuperLiga (in Serbian), Soccerway
Rules for classification: 1) Points; 2) Head-to-head points; 3) Head-to-head goal difference; 4) Head-to-head goals scored; 5) Head-to-head away goals scored (if two teams tied); 6) Goal difference; 7) Goals scored; 8) Fair play ranking; 9) Draw.

===== Matches =====
22 July 2017 1	Voždovac	0–0	Radnik Surdulica	Belgrade
20:00		Report		Stadium: Voždovac Stadium; Attendance: 0 Referee: Zoran Široki

29 July 2017 2	OFK Bačka	0–3	Voždovac	Bačka Palanka
18:00		Report	Filipović 63'; Putinčanin 89'; Mašović 90+2'	Stadium: Stadion Slavko Maletin Vava; Attendance: 2,200; Referee: Petar Piper

5 August 2017 3	Voždovac	2–1	Borac Čačak	Belgrade
20:00	Srećković 59'; Perović 88'	Report	Savić 27'	Stadium: Voždovac Stadium; Attendance: 200; Referee: Dragan Čolović

9 August 2017 4	Partizan	1–3	Voždovac	Belgrade
20:00	Đurđević 7' (pen.)	Report	Stuparević 8'; Duronjić 38'; Ješić 88'	Stadium: Partizan Stadium; Attendance: 4,000; Referee: Aleksandar Vasić

14 August 2017 5	Voždovac	1–0	Javor Matis	Belgrade
20:00	Ješić 65'	Report		Stadium: Voždovac Stadium; Attendance: 600; Referee: Aleksandar Vasić

19 August 2017 6	Spartak Subotica	0–0	Voždovac	Subotica
19:00		Report		Stadium: Subotica City Stadium; Attendance: 600; Referee: Danilo Grujić

26 August 2017 7	Voždovac	0–2	Mačva Šabac	Belgrade
19:00	Zec (yellow card) 34'; Ivković (yellow card) 62'; Mihajlov (yellow card) 72' (yellow-red card)	Report	Matić 14'; Igor Ristivojević (yellow card) 43'; Protić (yellow card) 72'; Lazar Ivić (yellow card) 89'; Gemović 90+1'	Stadium: Voždovac Stadium; Attendance: 500; Referee: (Serbia) Milorad Mažić

10 September 2017 8	Voždovac	1–1	Vojvodina	Belgrade
19:00	Ješić 24'; Petrović (yellow card) 85'; Ivković (yellow card) 89'	Report	Renan (yellow card) 56'; Avramovski 71'; Jovanović (yellow card) 77'; Vukasović (yellow card) 90'; Saničanin (yellow card) 90'	Stadium: Voždovac Stadium; Attendance: 600; Referee: (Serbia) Petar Piper

13 September 2017 9	Napredak Kruševac	1–2	Voždovac	Kruševac
18:00	Kasalica (yellow card) 35'; Sekedika 58'	Report	Srećković (yellow card) 5'; Andrija Luković 27' 82'; Filipović (yellow card) 61'	Stadium: Mladost Stadium; Attendance: 1,500; Referee: (Serbia) Novica Anđelovski

17 September 2017 10	Voždovac	0–2	Crvena zvezda	Belgrade
17:00		Report	Donald 40'; Kanga 90'	Stadium: Voždovac Stadium; Attendance: 1,000; Referee: Bojan Nikolić

24 September 2017 11	Mladost Lučani	1–3	Voždovac	Lučani
19:00	Gafurov 88'	Report	Putinčanin 35'; Filipović 49'; Petrović 64'	Stadium: Mladost Stadium; Attendance: 600; Referee: Zoran Široki

30 September 2017 12	Voždovac	6–1	Zemun	Belgrade
17:00	Asani 17' (o.g.); Luković 28' (pen.), 77'; Georgijević 35', 43', 59'	Report	Lasickas 90'	Stadium: Voždovac Stadium; Attendance: 400; Referee: Zoran Široki

14 October 2017 13	Radnički Niš	1–1	Voždovac	Niš
16:00	Pavkov 88' (pen.)	Report	Putinčanin 66'	Stadium: Čair Stadium; Attendance: 500; Referee: Bojan Nikolić

21 October 2017 14	Voždovac	3–0	Rad	Belgrade
17:00	Georgijević 37', 86', 89' (pen.)	Report		Stadium: Voždovac Stadium; Attendance: 400; Referee: Marko Popović

29 October 2017 15	Čukarički	2–1	Voždovac	Belgrade
17:00	Drinčić 86'; Milojević 90+4'	Report	Georgijević 22'	Stadium: Čukarički Stadium; Attendance: 200; Referee: Lazar Lukić

4 November 2017 16	Radnik Surdulica	1–0	Voždovac	Surdulica
17:00	Zlatanović 21' (pen.)	Report		Stadium: Surdulica City Stadium; Attendance: 800; Referee: Dragan Čolović

18 November 2017 17	Voždovac	2–0	OFK Bačka	Belgrade
17:00	Pavlović 39'; Luković 84' (pen.)	Report		Stadium: Voždovac Stadium; Attendance: 300; Referee: Milorad Mažić

24 November 2017 18	Borac Čačak	0–0	Voždovac	Čačak
17:00		Report		Stadium: Čačak Stadium; Attendance: 150; Referee: Srđan Jovanović

29 November 2017 19	Voždovac	0–1	Partizan	Belgrade
17:00		Report	Tošić 26'	Stadium: Voždovac Stadium; Attendance: 1,100; Referee: Aleksandar Vasić

3 December 2017 20	Javor Ivanjica	0–3	Voždovac	Ivanjica
13:00		Report	Ivković 42'; Luković 81'; Georgijević 90'	Stadium: Ivanjica Stadium; Attendance: 300; Referee: Novica Anđelovski

8 December 2017 21	Voždovac	2–3	Spartak Subotica	Belgrade
17:00	Filipović 79'; Ćirković 85'	Report	Savković 26', 82'; Ivanović 52' (pen.)	Stadium: Voždovac Stadium; Attendance: 500; Referee: Srđan Jovanović

13 December 2017 22	Mačva Šabac	1–1	Voždovac	Šabac
17:00	Gavrić 34'	Report	Georgijević 31'	Stadium: Gradski stadion Šabac; Attendance: 1,000; Referee: Miloš Đorđić

==== Championship round ====
===== League table =====
Pos	Team	Pld	W	D	L	GF	GA	GD	Pts	Qualification
1	Red Star Belgrade (C)	37	32	4	1	96	19	+77	60	Qualification for the Champions League first qualifying round
2	Partizan	37	23	8	6	71	33	+38	43	Qualification for the Europa League first qualifying round (Note: Since the winners of the 2017–18 Serbian Cup, Partizan, qualified for European competition based on league position, the spot awarded to the cup winners (Europa League first qualifying round) was passed to the fourth-placed team.)
3	Radnički Niš	37	18	8	11	63	51	+12	37 (Note: Radnički Niš finished ahead of Spartak Subotica on regular season points: Radnički 50 pts, Spartak 49 pts.)	Qualification for the Europa League first qualifying round
4	Spartak Subotica	37	18	7	12	62	49	+13	37	Qualification for the Europa League first qualifying round
5	Voždovac	37	16	8	13	48	42	+6	33	
6	Čukarički	37	16	9	12	54	44	+10	32	
7	Napredak Kruševac	37	15	8	14	57	55	+2	30	
8	Vojvodina	37	14	8	15	43	43	0	28	

Source: UEFA, Soccerway
Rules for classification: 1) Points; 2) Points in regular season; 3) Head-to-head points in regular season; 4) Head-to-head goal difference in regular season; 5) Head-to-head goals scored in regular season; 6) Head-to-head away goals scored in regular season (if two teams tied); 7) Goal difference; 8) Goals scored; 9) Fair play ranking; 10) Play-off (if two teams tied and need to decide champion or teams for UEFA competitions); 11) Drawing of lots.
(C) Champions
