= Danilo Pantić =

Serbian footballer

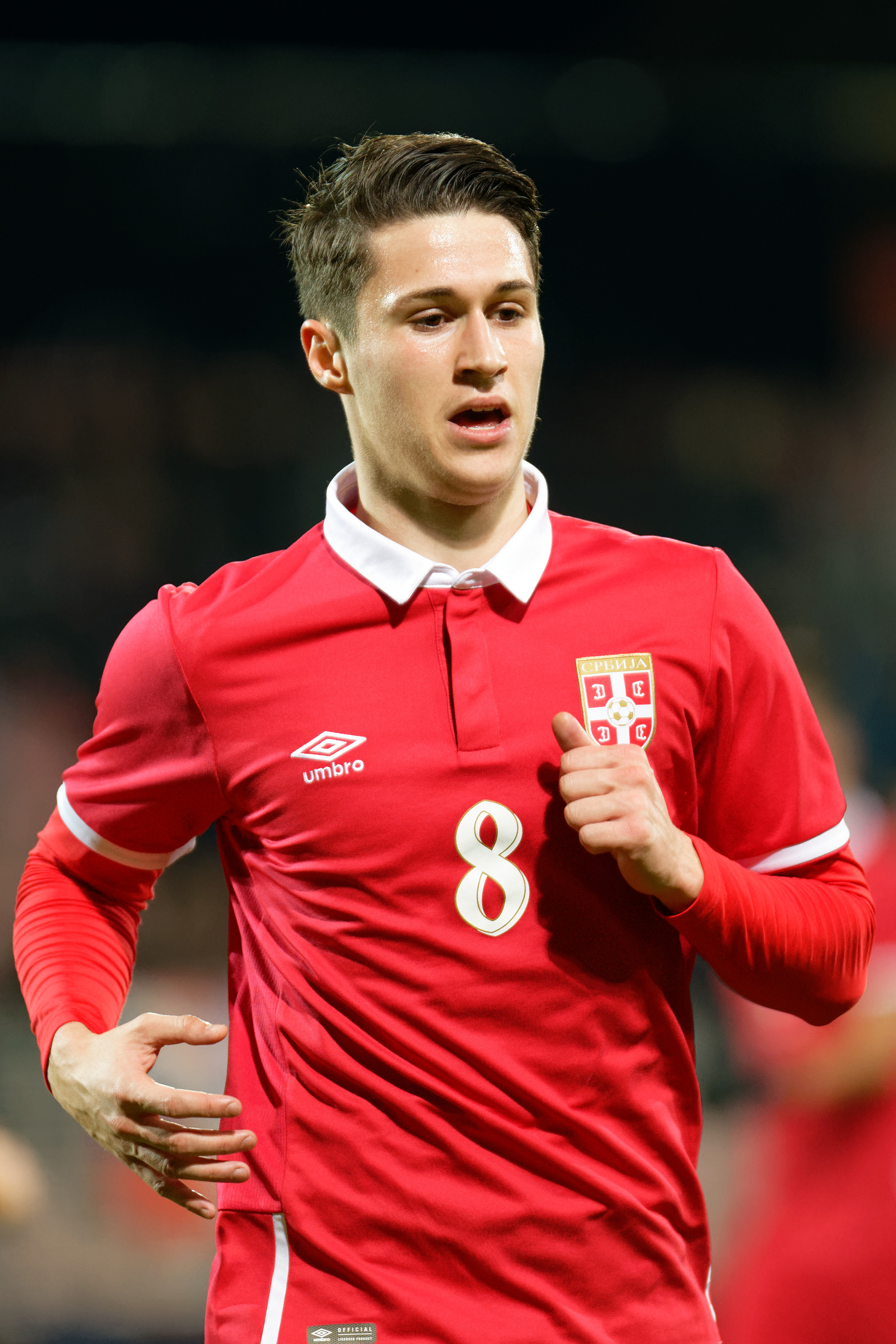
- Pantić with Serbia U21 in 2017

Personal information
- Full name: Danilo Pantić
- Date of birth: 26 October 1996 (age 30)
- Place of birth: Ruma, FR Yugoslavia
- Height: 1.83 m (6 ft 0 in)

Team information
- Current team: Loznica
- Number: 14

Youth career
- Jedinstvo Ruma
- 2007–2013: Partizan

Senior career*
Years	Team	Apps	(Gls)
2013–2015	Partizan	18	(2)
2015–2021	Chelsea	0	(0)
2015–2016	→ Vitesse (loan)	6	(0)
2016–2017	→ Excelsior (loan)	9	(0)
2017–2019	→ Partizan (loan)	63	(10)
2019–2020	→ Fehérvár (loan)	8	(0)
2020–2021	→ Čukarički (loan)	28	(1)
2021–2024	Partizan	36	(4)
2025	Mladost Lučani	9	(1)
2026–	Loznica	5	(1)

International career
2012–2013	Serbia U17	4	(1)
2013–2015	Serbia U19	12	(2)
2017–2019	Serbia U21	13	(3)
- * Club domestic league appearances and goals as of 1 November 2026

Danilo Pantić (Serbian Cyrillic: Данило Пантић, pronounced [danǐlo pǎːntitɕ]; born 26 October 1996) is a Serbian professional footballer who plays as a midfielder for Loznica.

He has represented Serbia at multiple youth levels.

== Club career ==
=== Partizan ===
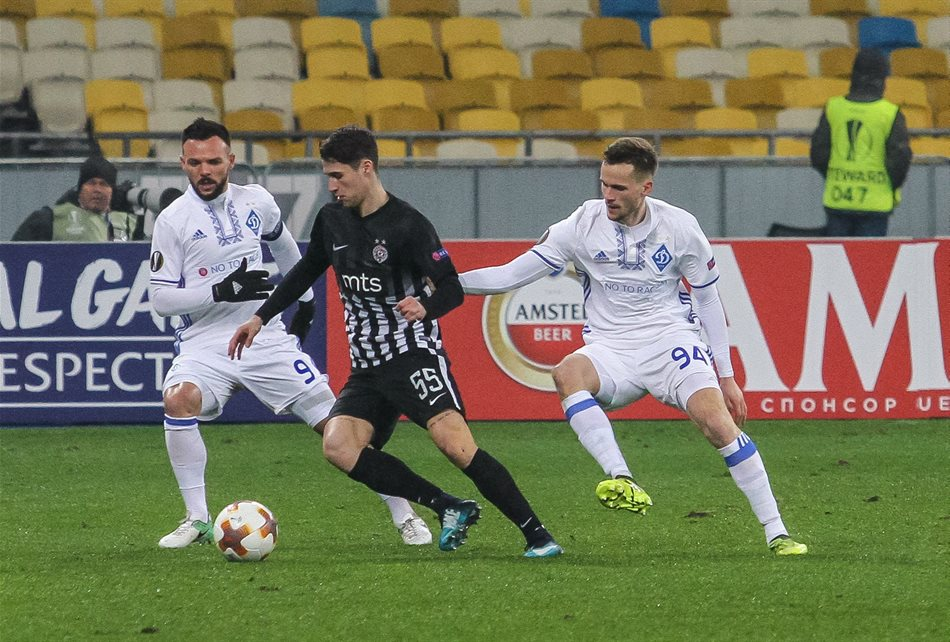
Pantić in action for Partizan in 2017 against Dynamo Kyiv

Pantić made his debut on 26 May 2013 in a league fixture against Spartak Subotica, replacing Vladimir Volkov in the 70th minute.

After a disagreement with Partizan over contract extension proposals, he signed a one-and-a-half-year contract with Partizan on December 5, 2013. Juventus had scouted Pantić since early 2014, allegedly monitoring his status due to his short contract. After hearing about interest from Juventus, Pantić told Večernje novosti that he wished to extend his contract with Partizan before leaving Serbia.

=== Chelsea ===
On 13 July 2015 Pantić signed for Chelsea for a reported fee of £1.25 million, on a four-year deal and was immediately loaned out to Eredivisie side Vitesse Arnhem.

==== Loan to Vitesse ====
He made his Vitesse debut 17 days later in a UEFA Europa League third qualifying round first leg against Southampton at St. Mary's, replacing Valeri Kazaishvili for the final 23 minutes of a 3–0 defeat. On 9 August 2015, Pantić made his league debut in a 1–1 draw with Willem II, replacing Valeri Qazaishvili in the 71st minute.

On 3 March 2016, after being supposedly 'frozen' out of the Vitesse starting eleven, Pantić stated his passion for a return to London: "I want to come back to Chelsea, just to train. Why am I in Vitesse if I am not good enough? I am [going] crazy! I've made no mistake. If I had a chance and blew it, I would keep quiet. Maybe in Vitesse they don't like us Serbs: Nemanja Matić did not get a chance here either and Uroš Đurđević played 22 matches in a year and a half."

Following this interview, Pantić was suspended by first-team manager Rob Maas indefinitely.

==== Loan to Excelsior ====
On 12 August 2016, Pantić joined Excelsior on loan for the 2016–17 campaign. On 17 September 2016, Pantić made his debut against Willem II off the bench coming on after half-time as Excelsior went on to score a late goal to earn a 1–1 draw. In the following match, on 20 September, he made his full debut, playing a full 90 minutes in a 1–0 win over BVV Barendrecht in the KNVB Cup.

==== Loan to Partizan ====
On 18 June 2017, Pantić returned to his boyhood club, Partizan on a season-long loan. On 22 July 2017, Pantić scored a goal against Mačva Šabac in first fixture of the 2017–18 Serbian SuperLiga season in a 6–1 home league win. On 5 November, Pantić entered in a game as a substitute for Marko Janković in the 72nd minute and with two assists help club to reach a 3–1 away victory over Mačva. That match is a big turn for Pantić, because after that match he played in first eleven almost every match until the end of the season. On 23 November 2017, he start in a five match of 2017–18 UEFA Europa League group stage, against Young Boys, he made one assist and was one of the best Partizan players on that match, where Partizan advanced to the knockout stage after 13 years. In second part of the season, Pantić scored a couple a very nice goals and had a couple assist. Due to his consistent performances throughout the season, Pantić was named in the league's best eleven.

On 5 July 2018, Pantić's loan at his boyhood club was extended for a further season.

==== Loan to Fehérvár ====
On 1 September 2019, Pantić joined the Hungarian side Fehérvár on loan until the end of the 2019–20 season.

==== Loan to Čukarički ====
On 13 August 2020, Pantić returned to Serbia with Čukarički on a season-long loan for the 2020–21 campaign. Two days later on 15 August 2020, he made his league debut with the club as a substitute, in a big 5–1 away win against Zlatibor Čajetina.

=== Return to Partizan ===
On 16 June 2021 he returned to Partizan on permanent basis. Pantić scored a goal in the Second qualifying round of 2021–22 UEFA Europa Conference League against Dunajská Streda. After a corner from the right side, Bibras Natcho made a nice save for Danilo Pantić, who scored an even better shot to give Belgrade side the lead.

== International career ==
=== Youth ===
Pantić has represented Serbia at the U17 and U19 levels. On 10 October 2014, Pantić scored his first and second goal for the U19 side in the opening twenty minutes against San Marino U19 to help Serbia to a 4–0 victory in their opening match of the 2015 UEFA Euro U19 Championship Qualifiers. Pantić has captained at the U19 level, captaining for the first time on 12 October 2014, against Armenia U19 in a UEFA Euro U19 Championship Qualifier match, which ended in a 1–0 victory for the Serbian side.

== Career statistics ==
As of match played 18 May 2021

Club	Season	League			National Cup		League Cup		Europe		Other		Total	
Club	Season	Division	Apps	Goals	Apps	Goals	Apps	Goals	Apps	Goals	Apps	Goals	Apps	Goals
Partizan	2012–13	Serbian SuperLiga	1	0	0	0	—		0	0	—		1	0
Partizan	2013–14	Serbian SuperLiga	10	1	0	0	—		0	0	—		10	1
Partizan	2014–15	Serbian SuperLiga	7	1	0	0	—		6 (Note: One appearance in UEFA Champions League, five in UEFA Europa League)	0	—		13	1
Partizan	Total		18	2	0	0	—		6	0	—		24	2
Chelsea	2015–16	Premier League	0	0	0	0	0	0	0	0	—		0	0
Vitesse (loan)	2015–16	Eredivisie	6	0	0	0	—		2 (Note: Appearances in UEFA Europa League)	0	—		8	0
Excelsior (loan)	2016–17	Eredivisie	9	0	2	0	—		—		—		11	0
Partizan (loan)	2017–18	Serbian SuperLiga	31	4	4	1	—		11 (Note: Three appearances in UEFA Champions League, eight in UEFA Europa League)	0	—		46	5
Partizan (loan)	2018–19	Serbian SuperLiga	32	6	5	1	—		8	1	—		45	8
Partizan (loan)	Total		63	10	9	2	—		19	1	—		91	13
Fehérvár (loan)	2019–20	NB I	8	0	3	0	—		—		—		11	0
Čukarički (loan)	2020–21	Serbian SuperLiga	28	1	1	0	—		—		—		29	1
Partizan	2021–22	Serbian SuperLiga	16	3	2	0	—		8	1	—		26	4
Partizan	2022–23	Serbian SuperLiga	18	1	0	0	—		1	0	—		19	1
Partizan	2023–24	Serbian SuperLiga	2	0	0	0	—		1	0	—		3	0
Partizan	Total		36	4	2	0	—		10	1	—		48	5
Career total			168	17	17	2	0	0	37	2	0	0	222	21

== Honours ==
Partizan

- Serbian SuperLiga: 2012–13, 2014–15
- Serbian Cup: 2017–18, 2018–19

Individual

- Serbian SuperLiga Team of the Season: 2017–18
