= Ivan Pešić =

Ivan Pešić may refer to:

- Ivan Pešić (footballer, born 1989), Serbian footballer
- Ivan Pešić (footballer, born 1992), Croatian footballer
- Ivan Pešić (handballer) (born 1989), Croatian handball goalkeeper
- Ivan Pesic (businessman), founder of Silvaco
