= Marko Jovičić =

Serbian association footballer

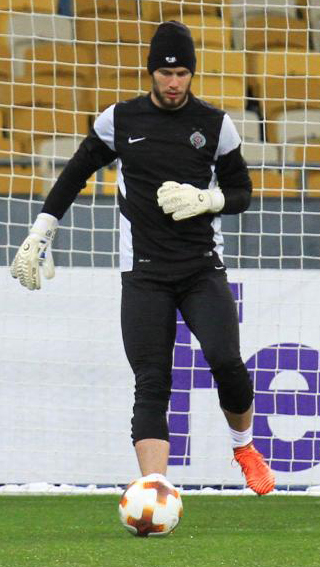
- Jovičić with Partizan in 2017

Personal information
- Date of birth: 2 February 1995 (age 31)
- Place of birth: Belgrade, FR Yugoslavia
- Height: 1.86 m (6 ft 1 in)
- Position: Goalkeeper

Youth career
- Žarkovo
- Red Star Belgrade
- Rad
- Partizan

Senior career*
Years	Team	Apps	(Gls)
2013–2014	Žarkovo	20	(0)
2015	Teleoptik	4	(0)
2016–2020	Partizan	12	(0)
2019–2020	→ Hibernians (loan)	28	(0)
2020–2021	Inđija	28	(0)
2021	Mosta	9	(0)
2022	Velež Mostar	5	(0)
2023	Hibernians	2	(0)
- * Club domestic league appearances and goals as of 14 April 2023

Marko Jovičić (Serbian Cyrillic: Марко Јовичић; born 2 February 1995) is a Serbian professional footballer who plays as a goalkeeper.

== Career ==
Jovičić made his senior debuts with Žarkovo in the Serbian League Belgrade.

In the 2015 winter transfer window, Jovičić switched to Teleoptik.

In early 2016, Jovičić signed a five-year deal with Partizan.

On 14 September 2021, he returned to Malta and joined Mosta.

== Honours ==
Partizan

- Serbian SuperLiga: 2016–17
- Serbian Cup: 2015–16, 2016–17, 2017–18
