= Ognjen Ožegović =

Serbian footballer (born 1994)

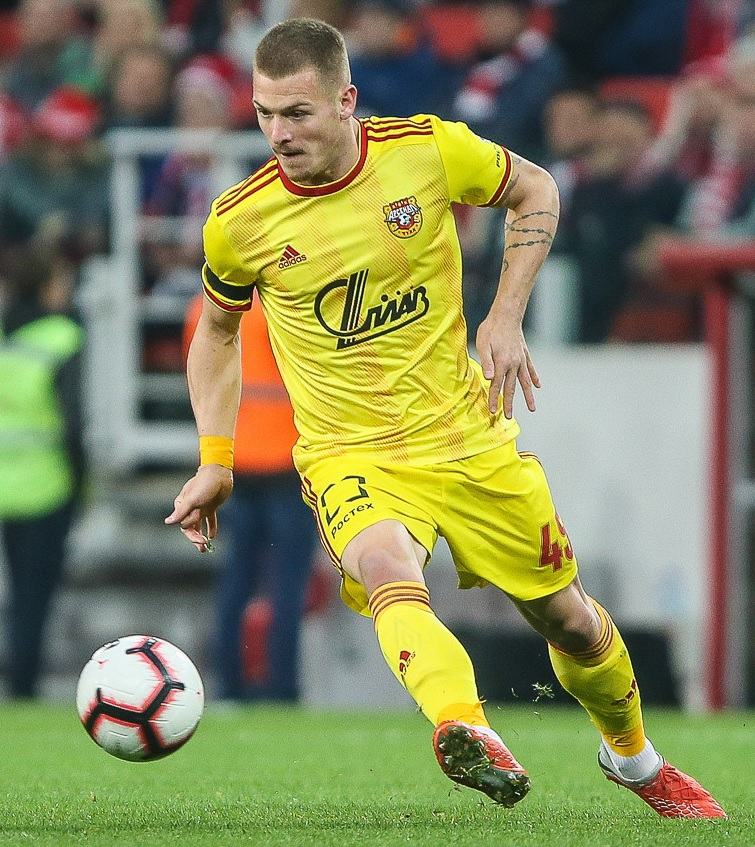
- Ožegović with Arsenal Tula in 2018

Personal information
- Date of birth: 9 June 1994 (age 32)
- Place of birth: Gradiška, Bosnia and Herzegovina
- Height: 1.80 m (5 ft 11 in)
- Position: Striker

Team information
- Current team: Levadiakos
- Number: 9

Youth career
- Kozara Gradiška
- Borac Banja Luka
- Red Star Belgrade

Senior career*
Years	Team	Apps	(Gls)
2012–2013	Red Star Belgrade	4	(0)
2012	→ Banat Zrenjanin (loan)	14	(2)
2013	→ Voždovac (loan)	8	(1)
2014	Rad	10	(3)
2014	Jagodina	4	(0)
2015	Borac Čačak	13	(6)
2015	Vojvodina	18	(7)
2016	Changchun Yatai	9	(0)
2016–2017	Čukarički	31	(17)
2017–2019	Partizan	37	(12)
2018–2019	→ Arsenal Tula (loan)	8	(1)
2019–2020	Darmstadt 98	5	(0)
2020–2022	Adanaspor	37	(19)
2022	Manisa	15	(2)
2022–2023	Volos	25	(6)
2023–2024	A.E. Kifisia	30	(16)
2024–2025	Pari Nizhny Novgorod	16	(2)
2025	→ Sakaryaspor (loan)	10	(6)
2025–2026	Atromitos	14	(2)
2026–	Levadiakos	18	(2)

International career^{‡}
2011	Serbia U17 (Note: Only official UEFA matches included)	2	(1)
2013	Serbia U19	6	(0)
2015–2017	Serbia U21	13	(6)
2016	Serbia	1	(0)
Medal record
Gold medal – first place	UEFA Under-19 Championship	2013
- * Club domestic league appearances and goals as of 1 November 2026 ‡ National team caps and goals as of 1 September 2017

Ognjen Ožegović (Serbian Cyrillic: Огњен Ожеговић, pronounced [ǒɡɲen oʒêɡoʋitɕ, - ǒʒeː-], born 9 June 1994) is a Serbian professional footballer who plays as a striker for Super League Greece club Levadiakos.

== Club career ==
Born in Gradiška, Ožegović made his first football steps with the local club Kozara and later he moved to Borac Banja Luka. Subsequently, Ožegović went through the youth setup at Red Star Belgrade, where captained a team for a period. He was initially sent out on loan to Banat Zrenjanin (2012), and then to Voždovac (2013), in order to gain experience. In early 2014, Ožegović terminated his contract with Red Star. He subsequently signed a six-month deal with Rad, helping them avoid relegation from the top flight in the 2013–14 campaign.

In the 2014–15 season, Ožegović played for Jagodina (fall) and Borac Čačak (spring). He scored six times for the latter side, including a long-range volley in a 3–1 win over his former club Jagodina, securing him the Goal of the Season award. In July 2015, Ožegović signed a three-year contract with Vojvodina. He netted seven league goals for the side, including a bicycle kick in a 2–0 win against Javor Ivanjica that earned him the Goal of the Season award for the second time in a row. He also scored twice in the first leg of the third qualifying round for the UEFA Europa League, in a 4–0 away victory over Sampdoria.

In early 2016, Ožegović moved abroad to China and joined Super League club Changchun Yatai. He failed to score in nine games for the side, before returning to Serbia.

On 31 August 2016, Ožegović signed a one-year contract with Čukarički. He scored a total of 16 goals in 25 league appearances over the course of the 2016-17 season. In addition to the regular season, Ožegović was prolific in Čukarički's 2016–17 Serbian Cup campaign, scoring in the second round against Javor and in the second leg of the semi-final against Red Star Belgrade.

=== Partizan ===
On 31 August 2017, Ožegović joined Partizan. He signed a three-year contract and was given the number 51 shirt. He made his debut for the club on 9 September 2017, against Mladost Lučani. He scored his first goal for Partizan on 17 September 2017 against Radnički Niš in a 3–1 home league victory.

On 28 September 2017, he recorded his first European goals after found the back of the net in a 2–3 home loss to Dynamo Kyiv in 2017–18 UEFA Europa League group stage second match. He also scored goal in 2–1 home victory over Young Boys, on 26 November, as Partizan advanced to the knockout stage after 13 years.

On 14 April 2018, Ožegović scored his first goal in Eternal Derby, converting a penalty kick in a 2–1 defeat.

==== Arsenal Tula (loan) ====
On 4 September 2018, he joined Russian Premier League club FC Arsenal Tula on loan.

=== Partizan return ===
Ožegović returned to Partizan for the 2019–20 season. He scored his first Super Liga goal on 4 August 2019, in a 4–0 win over Mačva.

=== Darmstadt 98 ===
On 2 September 2019, Ožegović joined Darmstadt 98 on a two-year deal. In July 2020, after making just five appearances as a substitute, he agreed the termination of his contract.

=== Manisa ===
On 20 January 2022, Ožegović signed a 1.5-year contract with Manisa.

=== Volos ===
Ožegović made his debut for the team on 11 September 2022 at the Karaiskakis Stadium against Olympiacos, scoring a goal in the 29th minute after an assist from Paolo Fernandes. A week later, in the fifth round of the Super League Greece, Ožegović scored his second goal for Volos against Ionikos. On 10 November, Ožegović scored two goals against PAS Giannina and thus brought his team three new points. On 16 January 2023, Ožegović ended his team's five-match winless streak by scoring the only goal in a 0–1 win over Ionikos.

=== A.E. Kifisia ===
On 14 July 2023, Ožegović signed for the 2022–23 Super League Greece 2 champions A.E. Kifisia. He made his debut for his new club on 20 August 2023 in a 3–0 loss against PAS Giannina. On 1 September 2023, in a 2–1 win over Atromitos Ožegović and Antonis Papasavvas helped their club record their first ever victory in the top tier of Greek football.

=== Pari NN ===
On 4 July 2024, Ožegović signed a two-year contract with Pari Nizhny Novgorod in the Russian Premier League. On 24 January 2025, he was loaned to Sakaryaspor in Turkey.

=== Atromitos ===
On 4 August 2025, Ožegović returned to Greece and joined Atromitos.

== International career ==
Ožegović made his official debut for the Serbia U17s at the 2011 UEFA European Under-17 Championship. He subsequently represented Serbia at the 2013 UEFA European Under-19 Championship, as the team won the tournament. Four years later, Ožegović was named in the final 23-man squad for the 2017 UEFA European Under-21 Championship.

In September 2016, Ožegović appeared in Serbia's friendly match against Qatar.

== Controversy ==
In an interview for mondo.rs in summer 2017, he said that his dream was to win a title with Red Star and celebrate it in front of the north stand with Delije. He also said that his dream did not come truth because of club policy at time, which, in his words, favoured "players from Ghana and Uganda over Red Star children." When he became a potential transfer target of Partizan in late August that summer, many Partizan supporters were against their club signing him. Finally, Ožegović signed with Partizan on last day of the summer transfer window. During the official promotion at new club, sports director Ivica Iliev revealed that Ožegović started playing football with Partizan. Several days later in interview for Sportski žurnal, Ožegović explained that he spent three months training with the club at the age of 13.

== Personal life ==
Ožegović is religious Orthodox Christian. He was born as the only child in the family. His father, Marinko, is a retired footballer who played as a goalkeeper for Borac Banja Luka and Rudar Velenje.

== Career statistics ==
=== Club ===
As of match played 7 December 2024

Appearances and goals by club, season and competition
Club	Season	League			National Cup		Europe		Other		Total	
Club	Season	Division	Apps	Goals	Apps	Goals	Apps	Goals	Apps	Goals	Apps	Goals
Red Star Belgrade	2011–12	Serbian SuperLiga	0	0	0	0	0	0	—		0	0
Red Star Belgrade	2012–13	Serbian SuperLiga	4	0	—		0	0	—		4	0
Red Star Belgrade	2013–14	Serbian SuperLiga	0	0	—		0	0	—		0	0
Red Star Belgrade	Total		4	0	0	0	0	0	—		4	0
Banat Zrenjanin (loan)	2012–13	Serbian First League	14	2	—		—		—		14	2
Voždovac (loan)	2013–14	Serbian SuperLiga	8	1	0	0	—		—		8	1
Rad	2013–14	Serbian SuperLiga	10	3	—		—		1 (Note: Including an appearance in the relegation play-off)	0	11	3
Jagodina	2014–15	Serbian SuperLiga	4	0	2	0	—		—		6	0
Borac Čačak	2014–15	Serbian SuperLiga	13	6	—		—		—		13	6
Vojvodina	2015–16	Serbian SuperLiga	18	7	2	0	6	2	—		26	9
Changchun Yatai	2016	Chinese Super League	9	0	0	0	—		—		9	0
Čukarički	2016–17	Serbian SuperLiga	25	16	5	3	—		—		30	19
Čukarički	2017–18	Serbian SuperLiga	6	1	—		—		—		6	1
Čukarički	Total		31	17	5	3	—		—		36	20
Partizan	2017–18	Serbian SuperLiga	28	9	4	2	7 (Note: All appearances in UEFA Europa League)	2	—		39	13
Partizan	2018–19	Serbian SuperLiga	4	1	0	0	2	1	—		6	2
Partizan	2019–20	Serbian SuperLiga	5	2	0	0	6	1	—		11	3
Partizan	Total		37	12	4	2	15	4	—		56	18
Arsenal Tula (loan)	2018–19	Russian Premier League	8	1	3	0	—		—		11	1
Darmstadt 98	2019–20	2. Bundesliga	5	0	0	0	—		—		5	0
Adanaspor	2020–21	TFF First League	24	14	1	0	—		—		25	14
Adanaspor	2021–22	TFF First League	13	5	0	0	—		—		13	5
Adanaspor	Total		37	19	1	0	—		—		38	19
Manisa	2021–22	TFF First League	15	2	0	0	—		—		15	2
Volos	2022–23	Super League Greece	25	6	3	1	—		—		28	7
A.E. Kifisia	2023–24	Super League Greece	30	16	1	0	—		—		31	16
Nizhny Novgorod	2024–25	Russian Premier League	16	2	3	0	—		—		19	2
Career total			284	94	24	6	21	6	1	0	330	106

=== International ===
As of 29 September 2016

Serbia
Year	Apps	Goals
2016	1	0
Total	1	0

== Honours ==
Red Star Belgrade

- Serbian Cup: 2011–12

Partizan

- Serbian Cup: 2017–18

Serbia

- UEFA Under-19 Championship: 2013
