= Nikola Radović (footballer, born 1992) =

Serbian footballer

Personal information
- Date of birth: 10 July 1992 (age 34)
- Place of birth: Kraljevo, FR Yugoslavia
- Height: 1.71 m (5 ft 7 in)
- Positions: Winger; second striker

Youth career
- Sloga Kraljevo

Senior career*
| Years | Team | Apps | (Gls) |
| 2009–2015 | Sloga Kraljevo | 101 | (13) |
| 2015 | Jagodina | 2 | (0) |
| 2015–2016 | BSK Borča | 26 | (7) |
| 2016–2019 | Radnik Surdulica | 65 | (9) |
| 2019 | Bačka Palanka | 15 | (1) |
| 2020–2021 | Borec Veles | 20 | (5) |
| 2021 | Mladost Novi Sad | | |
- * Club domestic league appearances and goals as of 9 December 2020

Nikola "Tiske" Radović (Serbian Cyrillic: Никола Радовић; born 10 July 1992) is a Serbian football forward.
