= Marko Janković (footballer, born 1995) =

Montenegrin footballer

Marko Janković Марко Јанковић
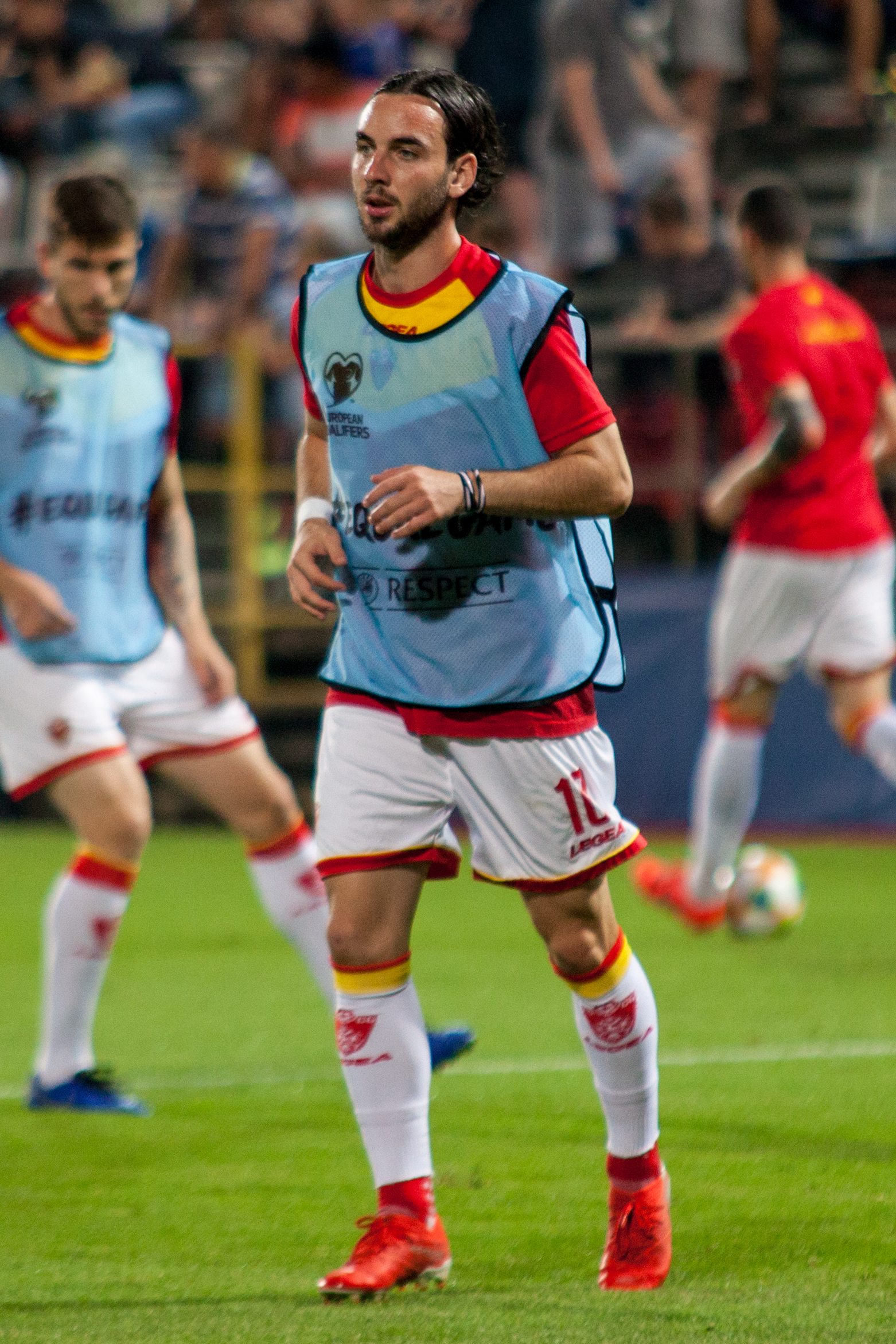
- Janković with Montenegro in 2019

Personal information
- Date of birth: 9 July 1995 (age 31)
- Place of birth: Cetinje, FR Yugoslavia
- Height: 1.72 m (5 ft 8 in)
- Positions: Attacking midfielder; winger

Team information
- Current team: Qarabağ
- Number: 8

Youth career
- Lovćen
- 2007–2012: Partizan

Senior career*
Years	Team	Apps	(Gls)
2012–2013	Partizan	0	(0)
2012–2013	→ Teleoptik (loan)	27	(0)
2013–2017	Olympiacos	0	(0)
2014–2015	→ OFK Beograd (loan)	19	(4)
2015–2016	→ Maribor (loan)	10	(0)
2016–2017	→ Partizan (loan)	30	(4)
2017–2019	Partizan	38	(5)
2019–2021	SPAL	12	(0)
2020–2021	→ Crotone (loan)	7	(0)
2021–2022	Beitar Jerusalem	23	(2)
2022	Hapoel Tel Aviv	11	(0)
2022–	Qarabağ	102	(7)

International career^{‡}
2011	Montenegro U17 (Note: Official competitive UEFA matches only.)	3	(0)
2012–2014	Montenegro U19	9	(1)
2015–2016	Montenegro U21	10	(1)
2016–	Montenegro	66	(1)
- * Club domestic league appearances and goals as of 20 October 2026 ‡ National team caps and goals as of 15 November 2026

Marko Janković (Serbian Cyrillic: Марко Јанковић; born 9 July 1995) is a Montenegrin professional footballer who plays as a midfielder for Azerbaijan Premier League club Qarabağ and the Montenegro national team.

== Club career ==
=== Early career ===
Born in Cetinje, Janković joined Partizan from Lovćen as a trainee in 2007. He spent the next five years in the club's youth setup, before making his senior debuts with their affiliated club Teleoptik in the 2012–13 Serbian First League.

=== Olympiacos ===
In summer 2013, Janković was transferred to Greek champions Olympiacos on a four-year contract. He played for their youth side in the inaugural 2013–14 UEFA Youth League, but failed to make any first team appearances.

In the summer of 2014, Janković was sent on loan to Serbian club OFK Beograd. He scored on his league debut after coming on as a substitute in a 3–2 home win over Novi Pazar. Throughout the 2014–15 Serbian SuperLiga, Janković scored four goals from 19 games.

On 31 August 2015, Janković was loaned to Slovenian club Maribor with an option to buy. He made his league debut for the side on 23 September in a 1–1 home draw with Domžale, coming on as a 62nd-minute substitute for Dare Vršič. During his spell at Maribor, Janković helped the club win the Slovenian Cup, playing the full 120 minutes and converting his penalty kick in the shoot-out against Celje in the final.

=== Partizan ===
On 15 June 2016, Janković joined his parent club Partizan on a season-long loan. He wore the number 95 shirt and made his competitive debut on 14 July in a 0–0 home draw with Zagłębie Lubin in the first leg of the UEFA Europa League second qualifying round. On 6 November, Janković netted his first official goal for Partizan, opening the scoring in an eventual 4–0 home league win over Novi Pazar. In his first campaign with Partizan, Janković helped the club win the double.

On 14 September 2017, Janković scored the opening goal in a 1–1 away draw against Swiss club Young Boys in the Europa League group stage. He finished the 2017–18 season with 42 appearances in all competitions and scored seven goals in the process.

On 10 November 2018, Janković made his 100th competitive appearance for Partizan in a 2–0 home league victory over Radnik Surdulica. Upon leaving Partizan, he forgave at least €160,000 worth of unpaid salary.

=== SPAL ===
On 31 January 2019, Janković signed a contract with Serie A side SPAL lasting until June 2022, in a transfer worth €1.8 million. Only half of the transfer fee went to Partizan, as the other 50% of the fee went to Olympiacos due to a percentage clause from his previous transfer from Olympiacos to Partizan. On 15 January 2021, Janković and SPAL mutually agreed to part ways.

On 31 January 2020, Janković joined Serie B club Crotone on loan until 30 June 2020.

=== Beitar Jerusalem ===
On 3 February 2021, Janković joined Israeli Premier League side Beitar Jerusalem as a free-agent.

=== Hapoel Tel Aviv ===
On 1 February 2022, he signed for Hapoel Tel Aviv.

== International career ==
Janković was capped for Montenegro at under-17, under-19 and under-21 level. He made his full international debut for Montenegro on 29 May 2016, coming on as a substitute in a 1–0 friendly loss away against Turkey. On 10 September 2018, Janković scored his first international goal for Montenegro in a 2–1 home victory over Lithuania in the 2018–19 UEFA Nations League C.

== Career statistics ==
=== Club ===
As of match played 1 June 2026

Appearances and goals by club, season and competition
Club	Season	Division	League		National cup (Note: Includes Serbian Cup, Slovenian Football Cup, Coppa Italia, Israel State Cup, Azerbaijan Cup)		League cup (Note: Includes Toto Cup)		Continental		Total	
Club	Season	Division	Apps	Goals	Apps	Goals	Apps	Goals	Apps	Goals	Apps	Goals
Teleoptik (loan)	2012–13	Serbian First League	27	0	1	0	—		—		28	0
Olympiacos	2013–14	Super League Greece	0	0	0	0	—		0	0	0	0
OFK Beograd (loan)	2014–15	Serbian SuperLiga	19	4	2	0	—		—		21	4
Maribor (loan)	2015–16	Slovenian PrvaLiga	10	0	4	0	—		0	0	14	0
Partizan (loan)	2016–17	Serbian SuperLiga	30	4	6	0	—		2 (Note: Appearances in UEFA Europa League)	0	38	4
Partizan	2017–18	Serbian SuperLiga	25	4	4	2	—		13 (Note: Four appearances in UEFA Champions League, nine appearances and a goal in UEFA Europa League)	1	42	7
Partizan	2018–19	Serbian SuperLiga	13	1	2	0	—		6	1	21	2
Partizan	Total		68	9	12	2	—		21	2	101	13
SPAL	2018–19	Serie A	4	0	0	0	—		—		4	0
SPAL	2019–20	Serie A	6	0	3	0	—		—		9	0
SPAL	2020–21	Serie B	2	0	1	0	—		—		3	0
SPAL	Total		12	0	4	0	—		—		16	0
Crotone (loan)	2019–20	Serie B	7	0	0	0	—		—		7	0
Beitar Jerusalem	2020–21	Israeli Premier League	12	1	2	0	0	0	—		14	1
Beitar Jerusalem	2021–22	Israeli Premier League	11	1	0	0	4	0	—		15	1
Beitar Jerusalem	Total		23	2	2	0	4	0	0	0	29	2
Hapoel Tel Aviv	2021–22	Israeli Premier League	11	0	0	0	0	0	—		11	0
Qarabağ	2022–23	Azerbaijan Premier League	24	1	2	0	—		6 (Note: Appearances in UEFA Champions League)	0	32	1
Qarabağ	2023–24	Azerbaijan Premier League	24	2	5	1	—		18 (Note: Four appearances and one goal in UEFA Champions League, fourteen appearances and one goal in UEFA Europa League)	2	47	5
Qarabağ	2024–25	Azerbaijan Premier League	21	1	5	0	—		12 (Note: Four appearances in UEFA Champions League, eight appearances in UEFA Europa League)	0	38	1
Qarabağ	2025–26	Azerbaijan Premier League	26	2	5	0	—		13	3	44	5
Qarabağ			95	6	17	1	—		49	5	161	12
Career total			272	21	42	3	4	0	69	7	388	31

=== International ===
As of match played 15 November 2026

Appearances and goals by national team and year
National team	Year	Apps	Goals
Montenegro	2016	1	0
Montenegro	2017	6	0
Montenegro	2018	7	1
Montenegro	2019	6	0
Montenegro	2020	3	0
Montenegro	2021	6	0
Montenegro	2022	8	0
Montenegro	2023	7	0
Montenegro	2024	7	0
Montenegro	2025	6	0
Montenegro	2026	9	0
Total		66	1

Scores and results list Montenegro's goal tally first, score column indicates score after each Janković goal.

List of international goals scored by Marko Janković
No.	Date	Venue	Opponent	Score	Result	Competition
1	10 September 2018	Podgorica City Stadium, Podgorica, Montenegro	Lithuania	2–0	2–0	2018–19 UEFA Nations League C

== Honours ==
Maribor

- Slovenian Cup: 2015–16

Partizan

- Serbian SuperLiga: 2016–17
- Serbian Cup: 2016–17, 2017–18

Qarabağ

- Azerbaijan Premier League: 2022–23, 2023–24, 2024–25
- Azerbaijan Cup: 2023–24
