= Aleksandar Ješić =

Serbian footballer

Personal information
- Date of birth: 13 September 1994 (age 32)
- Place of birth: Gornji Milanovac, FR Yugoslavia
- Height: 1.76 m (5 ft 9 1/2 in)
- Position: Winger

Team information
- Current team: Omladinac Zablaće

Youth career
- Borac Čačak

Senior career*
Years	Team	Apps	(Gls)
2011–2012	Borac Čačak	5	(0)
2013–2016	OFK Beograd	55	(0)
2016–2018	Voždovac	46	(5)
2019–2020	Metalac GM	35	(7)
2020–2021	Mladost Lučani	41	(3)
2021–2022	Neftchi Fergana	18	(1)
2022–2023	Mladost Lučani	25	(0)
2023	Zhetysu	10	(0)
2024-	Omladinac Zablaće		
- * Club domestic league appearances and goals as of 23 November 2023

Aleksandar Ješić (Serbian Cyrillic: Александар Јешић; born 13 September 1994) is a Serbian professional footballer who plays as a midfielder.

== Club career ==
In December 2018, he joined Metalac GM.
