= Nikola Srećković =

Serbian footballer (born 1996)

Personal information
- Full name: Nikola Srećković
- Date of birth: 26 April 1996 (age 30)
- Place of birth: Valjevo, FR Yugoslavia
- Height: 1.80 m (5 ft 11 in)
- Positions: Attacking midfielder; winger

Team information
- Current team: Radnički Niš
- Number: 20

Youth career
- –2015: Rad

Senior career*
Years	Team	Apps	(Gls)
2015–2018	Voždovac	60	(4)
2018–2019	Vojvodina	12	(1)
2019–2023	Spartak Subotica	125	(21)
2023–2024	Wisła Płock	10	(0)
2024	→ Novi Pazar (loan)	17	(3)
2024–2025	Borac Banja Luka	16	(0)
2025	Velež Mostar	14	(0)
2025–	Radnički Niš	25	(2)

International career
2017	Serbia U21	2	(0)
- * Club domestic league appearances and goals as of 13 June 2026

Nikola Srećković (Serbian Cyrillic: Никола Срећковић; born 26 April 1996) is a Serbian professional footballer who plays as a midfielder for Radnički Niš.

== Career ==
=== Serbia ===
Born in Valjevo, Srećković won the 2014–15 Serbian youth league with Rad, and was nominated for the best player of that competition. After that, he joined Voždovac in the summer of 2015. He made his SuperLiga debut in matchday 8 of the 2015–16 season, against Radnik Surdulica. On the last day of the 2018 summer transfer window, Srećković signed a three-year deal with Vojvodina. A year later, Srećković signed a three-year deal with Spartak Subotica.

=== Wisła Płock ===
On 27 June 2023, Srećković signed a two-year deal with Polish I liga side Wisła Płock.

==== Loan to Novi Pazar ====
On 17 January 2024, Srećković returned to Serbia, joining Novi Pazar on loan until the end of the season, with an option to make the move permanent.

After returning from his stint with Novi Pazar, Srećković left Wisła by mutual consent on 24 July 2024.

=== Borac Banja Luka ===
On 28 July 2024, defending Bosnian champions Borac Banja Luka announced the signing of Srećković on a one-year contract. He terminated his contract by mutual consent on 11 January 2025.

== Career statistics ==
As of 1 May 2019

Club	Season	League			Cup		Continental		Other		Total	
Club	Season	Division	Apps	Goals	Apps	Goals	Apps	Goals	Apps	Goals	Apps	Goals
Voždovac	2015–16	SuperLiga	16	0	2	0	–		–		18	0
Voždovac	2016–17	SuperLiga	18	1	3	1	–		–		21	2
Voždovac	2017–18	SuperLiga	23	3	1	0	–		–		24	3
Voždovac	2018–19	SuperLiga	3	0	–		–		–		3	0
Voždovac	Total		60	4	6	1	–		–		66	5
Vojvodina	2018–19	SuperLiga	12	1	2	0	–		–		14	1
Spartak Subotica	2019–20	SuperLiga	0	0	0	0	–		–		0	0
Career total			72	5	8	1	–		–		80	6
