= Surdulica City Stadium =

Football stadium in Surdulica, Serbia

- Efbet Stadium
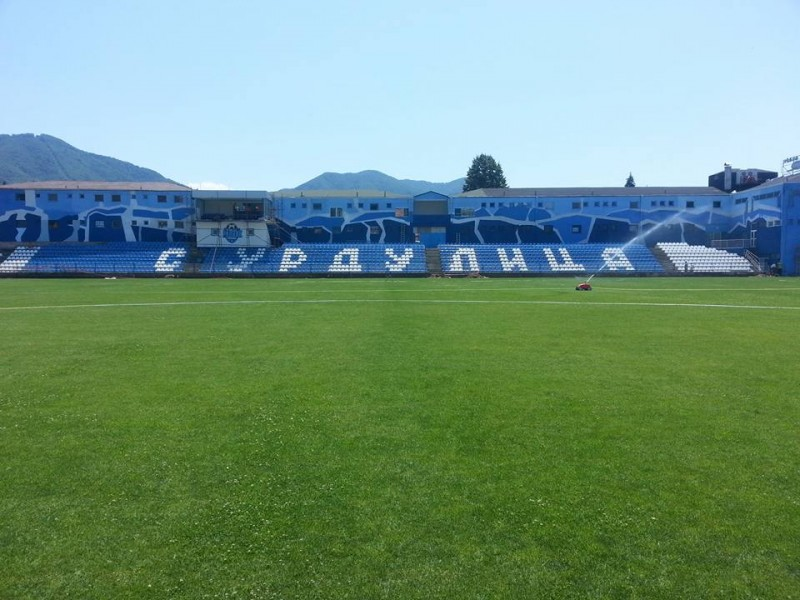
- Interactive map of Surdulica City Stadium
- Location: Surdulica, Serbia
- Coordinates: 42°41′32.5″N 22°9′55.5″E
- Capacity: 3,312

Construction
- Opened: 1955

Tenants
- FK Radnik Surdulica

Surdulica City Stadium (Serbian: Gradski stadion Surdulica), currently known as the Efbet Stadium for sponsorship reasons, is a football stadium in Surdulica, Serbia. It is the home ground of Serbian Superliga side FK Radnik Surdulica. The stadium has a capacity of 3,312 spectators.

Stadium exists from 1955 and from the beginning serves as a home ground of FK Radnik Surdulica. In 1987 the southern stand was created. In 2015 FK Radnik was promoted for the first time in its history to Serbian Superliga and in the summer of 2015 stadium was modernized and expanded; new stands on east, north and west were erected, as well as floodlight masts. Renovation works costs around 40 million dinars and expanded stadium's capacity to 3,312 seats.

On 23 May 2018 stadium hosted the final of Serbian Cup between FK Partizan and FK Mladost Lučani. Game was played at full stadium and was won 2–1 by FK Partizan, who gain the title for the sixth time in history (fifteenth including Yugoslav Era). Organization of this match in Surdulica was questioned due to relatively small stadium and security concerns, but the federation kept its decision.

On 15 November 2018 a friendly game between Serbian and Macedonian Under-18 national football teams was played at the stadium. Serbian team won by 2–0.

In 2018–19 season, after historic promotion to Superliga, FK Dinamo Vranje played most of their games at Surdulica City Stadium due to infrastructural troubles with the ground in their own town.

The walls after the southern, main stand are painted with characteristic murals.
