= Ivan Pešić (footballer, born 1989) =

Serbian footballer

Personal information
- Date of birth: 7 July 1989 (age 37)
- Place of birth: Čačak, SFR Yugoslavia
- Height: 1.76 m (5 ft 9 1/2 in)
- Positions: Midfielder; full-back

Youth career
- –2007: Dragačevo Guča

Senior career*
Years	Team	Apps	(Gls)
2007–2008	Dragačevo Guča	0	(0)
2008–2009	Mladost Lučani	6	(2)
2008–2009	→ Bežanija (loan)	14	(3)
2009–2011	Bežanija	48	(2)
2011–2012	Novi Pazar	3	(0)
2012–2020	Mladost Lučani	207	(6)
2020–2021	Borac Čačak	16	(0)
- * Club domestic league appearances and goals as of 15 May 2021

Ivan Pešić (Serbian Cyrillic: Иван Пешић, born 7 July 1989) is a Serbian football midfielder.

== Early career ==
Ivan Pešić was born in Čačak, SR Serbia. He began his career in his native Serbia playing for FK Dragačevo before moving to FK Mladost Lučani in the Jelen SuperLiga. He moved to Belgrade 2008 and played with FK Bežanija. In 2011, he moved to Novi Pazar in Serbian SuperLiga, making his debut against FK Vojvodina.

== Honours ==
Mladost Lučani

- Serbian First League: 2013–14
