= Voždovac Stadium =

Football stadium in Belgrade, Serbia

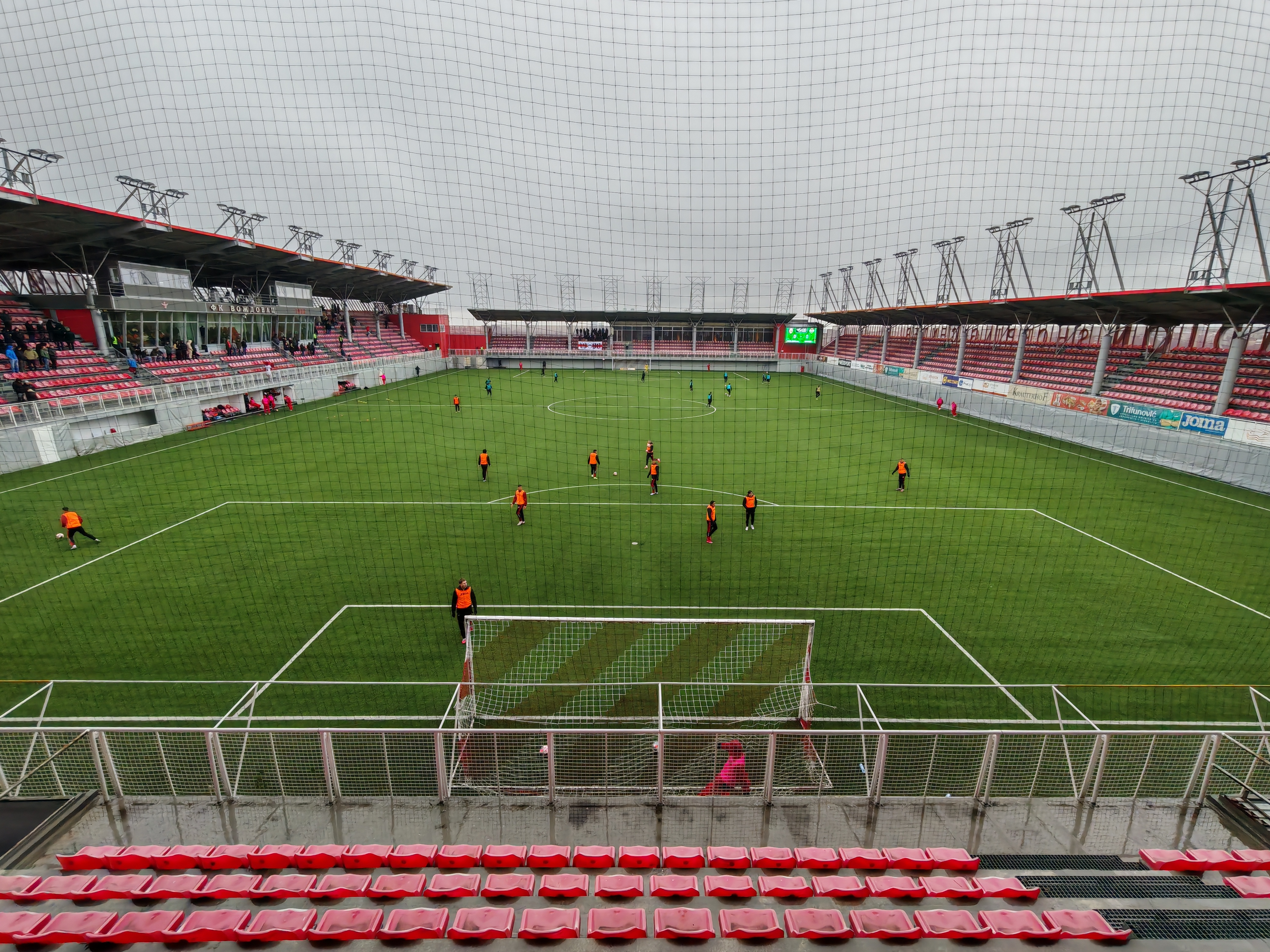
- UEFA

- Location within Belgrade
- Location: Voždovac, Belgrade, Serbia
- Coordinates: 44°46′29.6″N 20°29′24.7″E
- Owner: FK Voždovac
- Operator: FK Voždovac
- Capacity: 5,200
- Surface: Turf
- Acreage: 74.600 m^{2}

Construction
- Groundbreaking: 2011
- Built: 2011–2013
- Opened: August 2013
- Cost: approximately €22 million (2011–2012 construction)

Tenants
- Voždovac (2013–present); IMT (2023–2024)

Voždovac Stadium (Serbian: Стадион ФК Вождовац / Stadion FK Voždovac), commercially known as the Stadion Shopping Center, is a football stadium in Voždovac district of Belgrade, Serbia, that is the home ground of FK Voždovac. One of a few rooftop stadiums in the world designed for professional football, it was built on the top of a shopping mall and opened in August 2013.

== History ==
After the old venue of Voždovac was demolished, the new stadium began construction in 2011 along with the establishment of a new shopping center in the Zaplanjska street in Voždovac. It has a seating capacity of 5,175. The stadium meets all UEFA standards for qualifying matches in the UEFA Europa League and the UEFA Champions League.

== Gallery ==
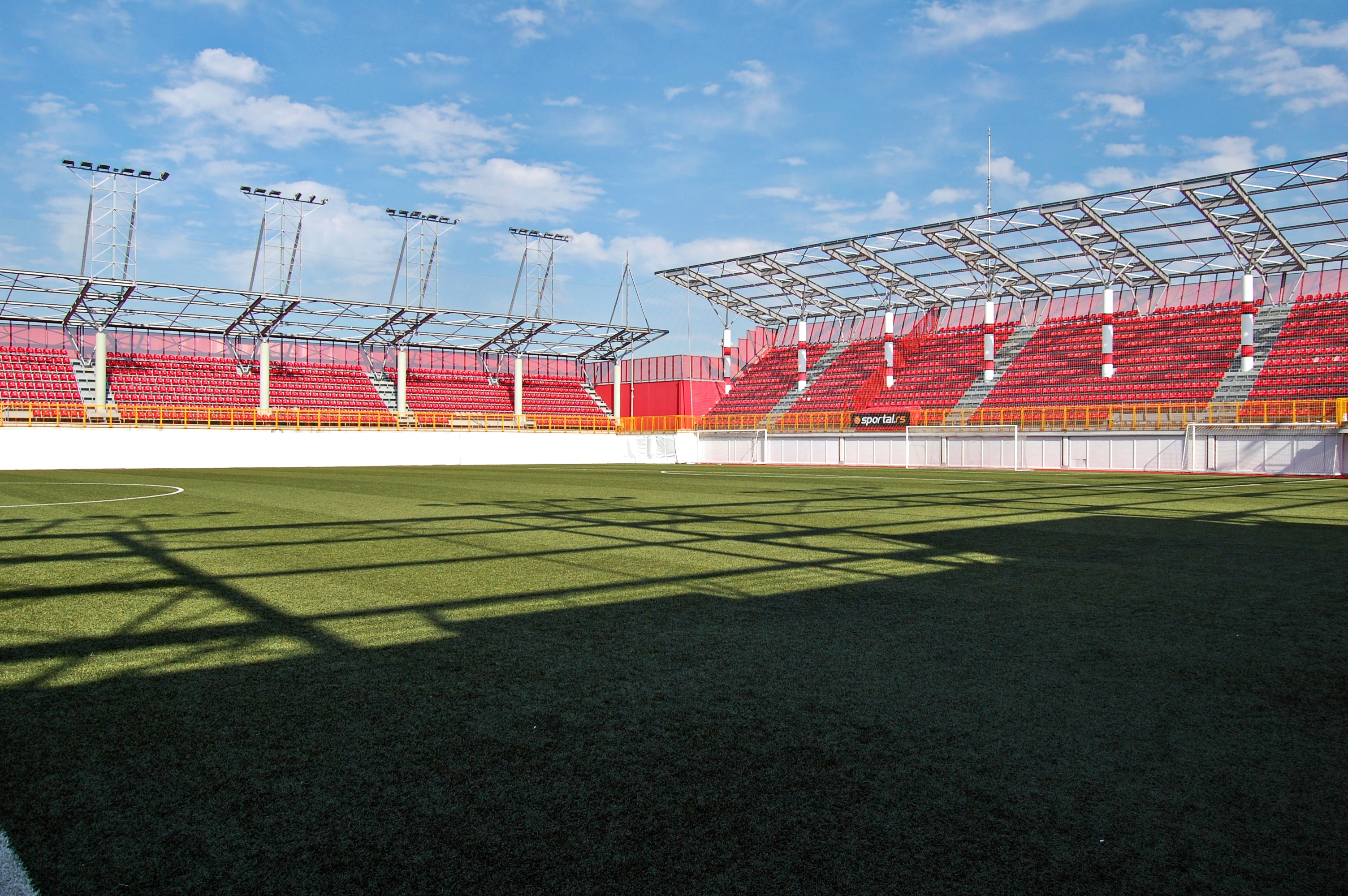
Voždovac Stadium after construction (no rooftops), August 2014

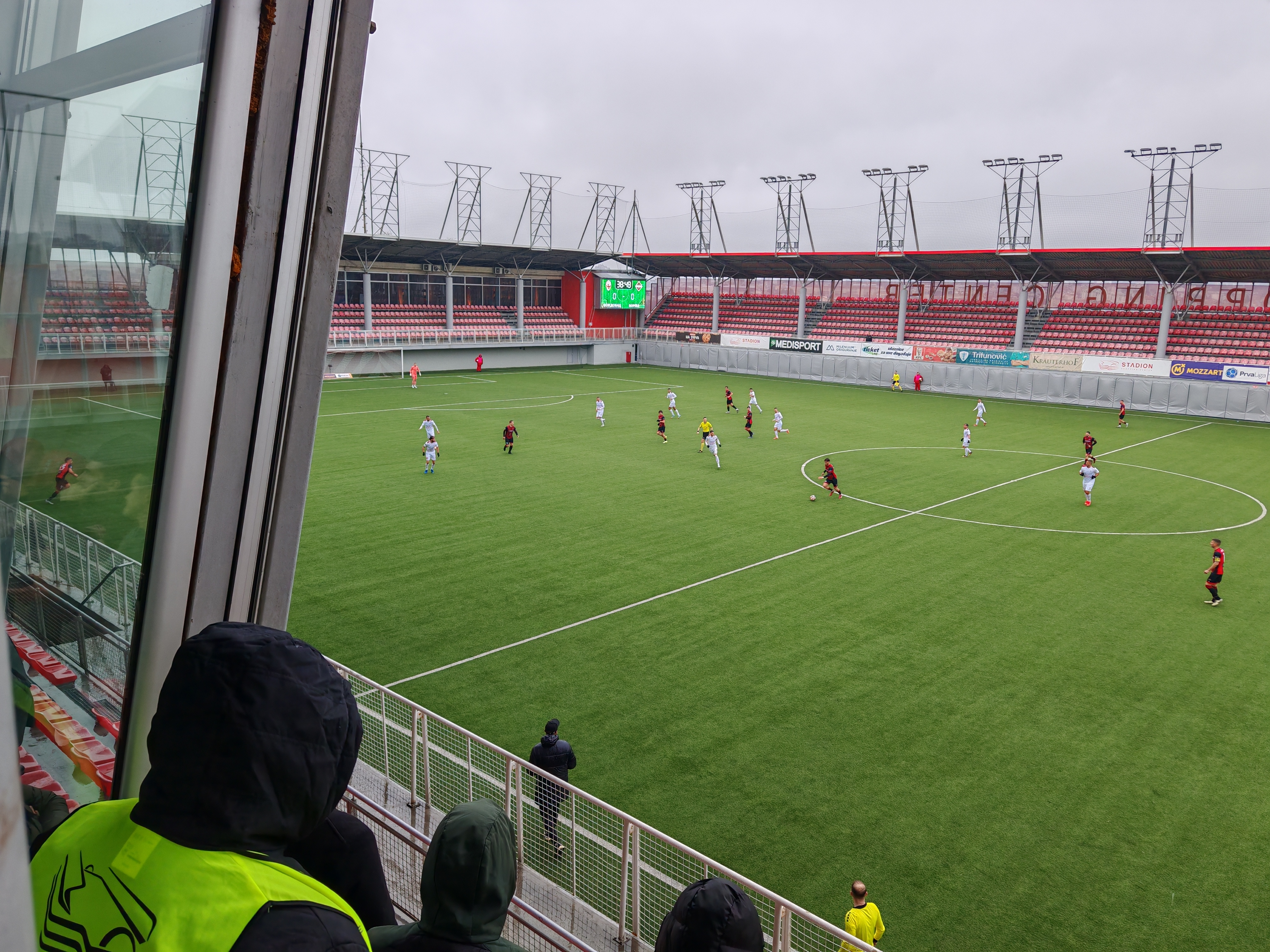
View on football pitch of Voždovac Stadium from the west stand, February 2026

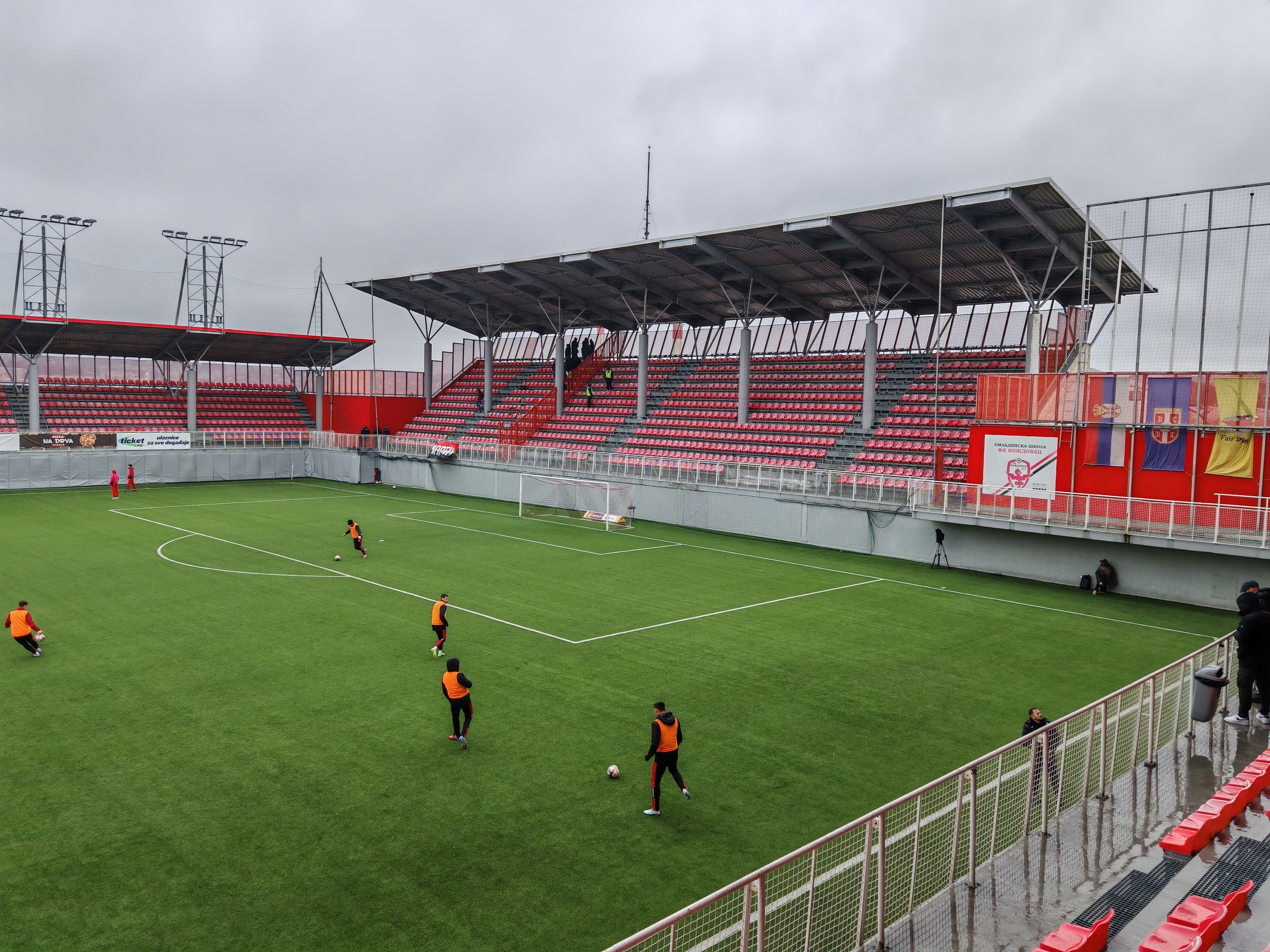
View on the south stand of Voždovac Stadium from the west stand

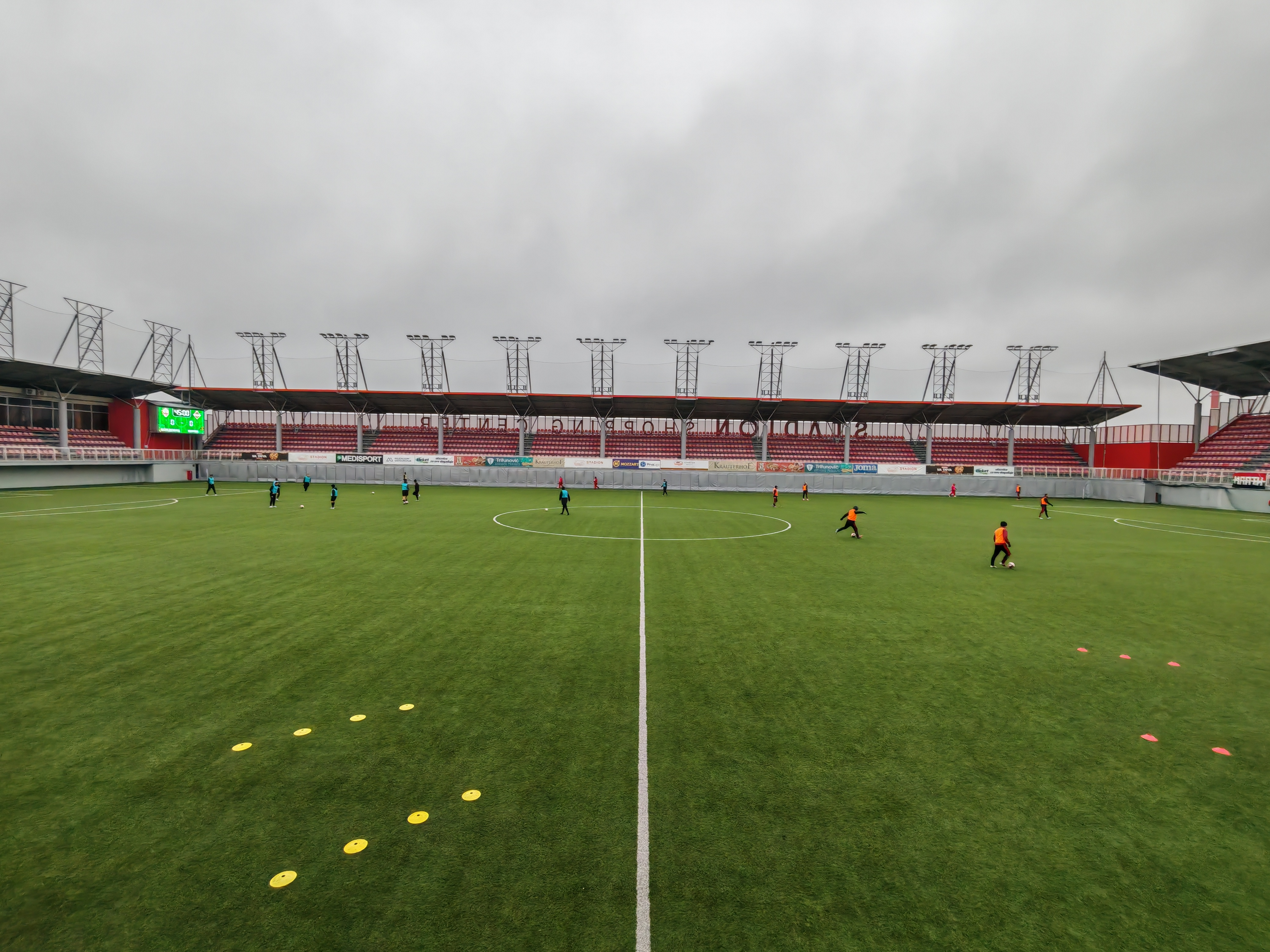
Centered view on the football pitch of Voždovac Stadium from the west stand

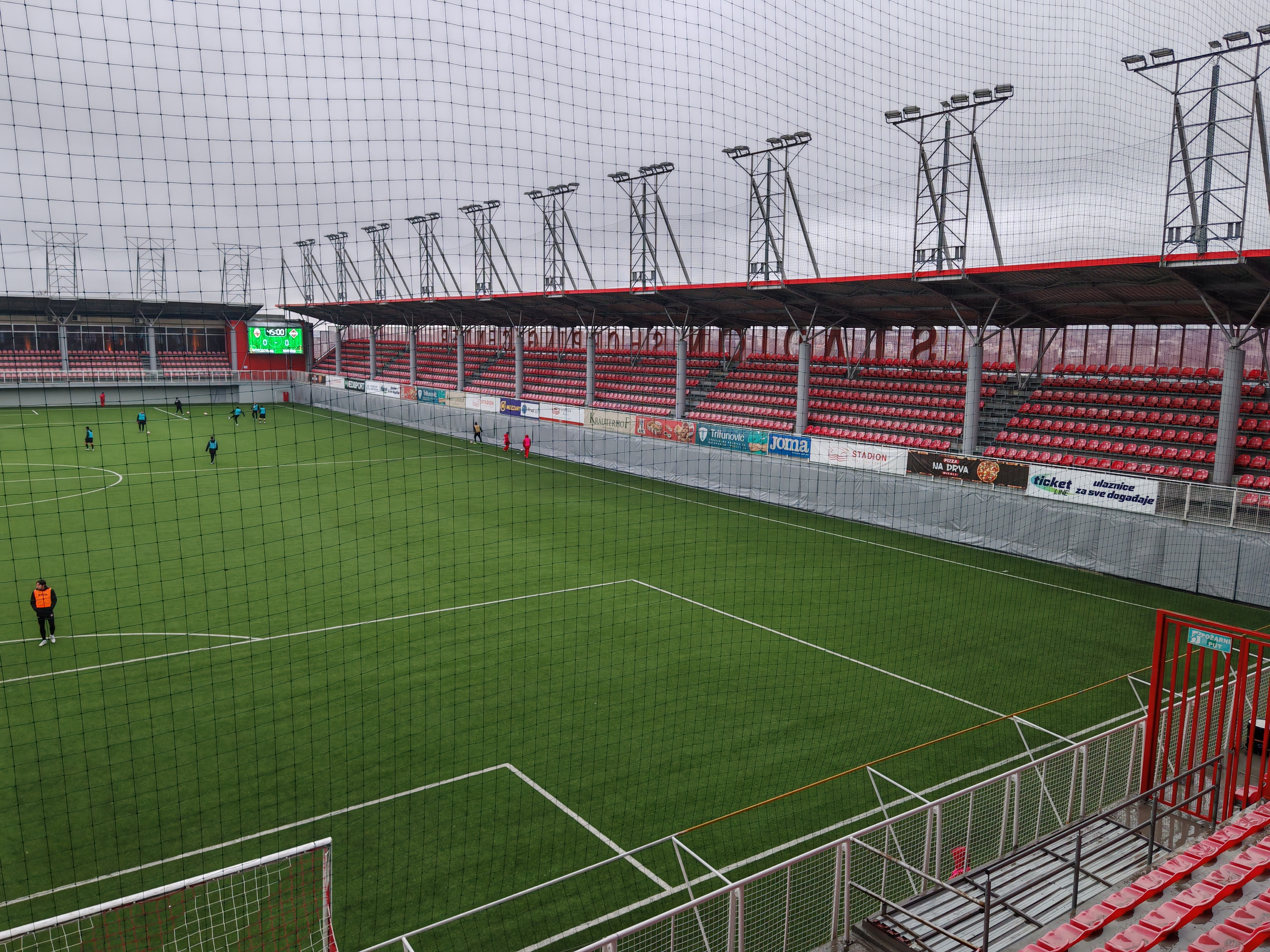
View on the east stand of Voždovac Stadium from the south stand

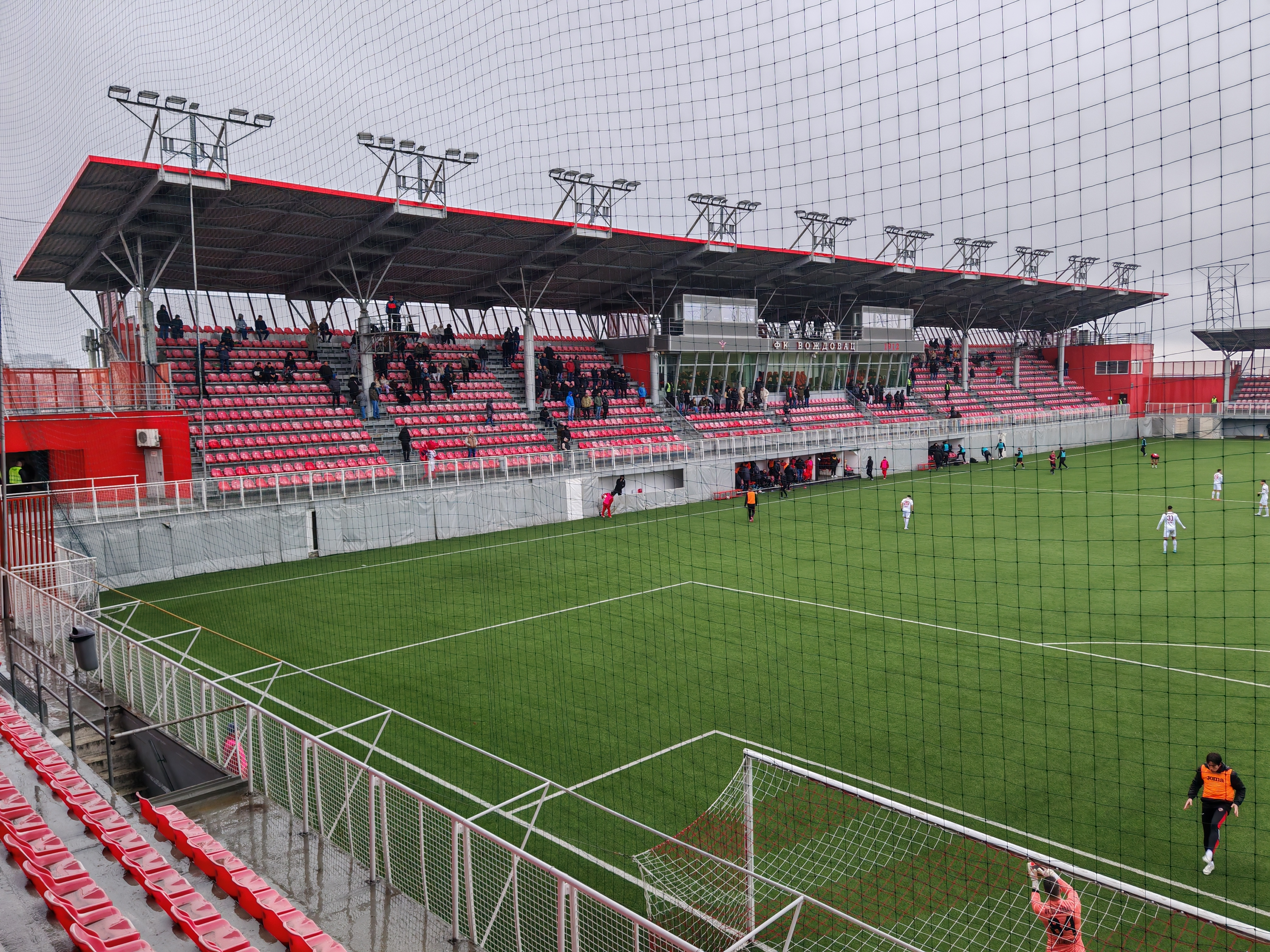
View on the west stand of Voždovac Stadium from the south stand

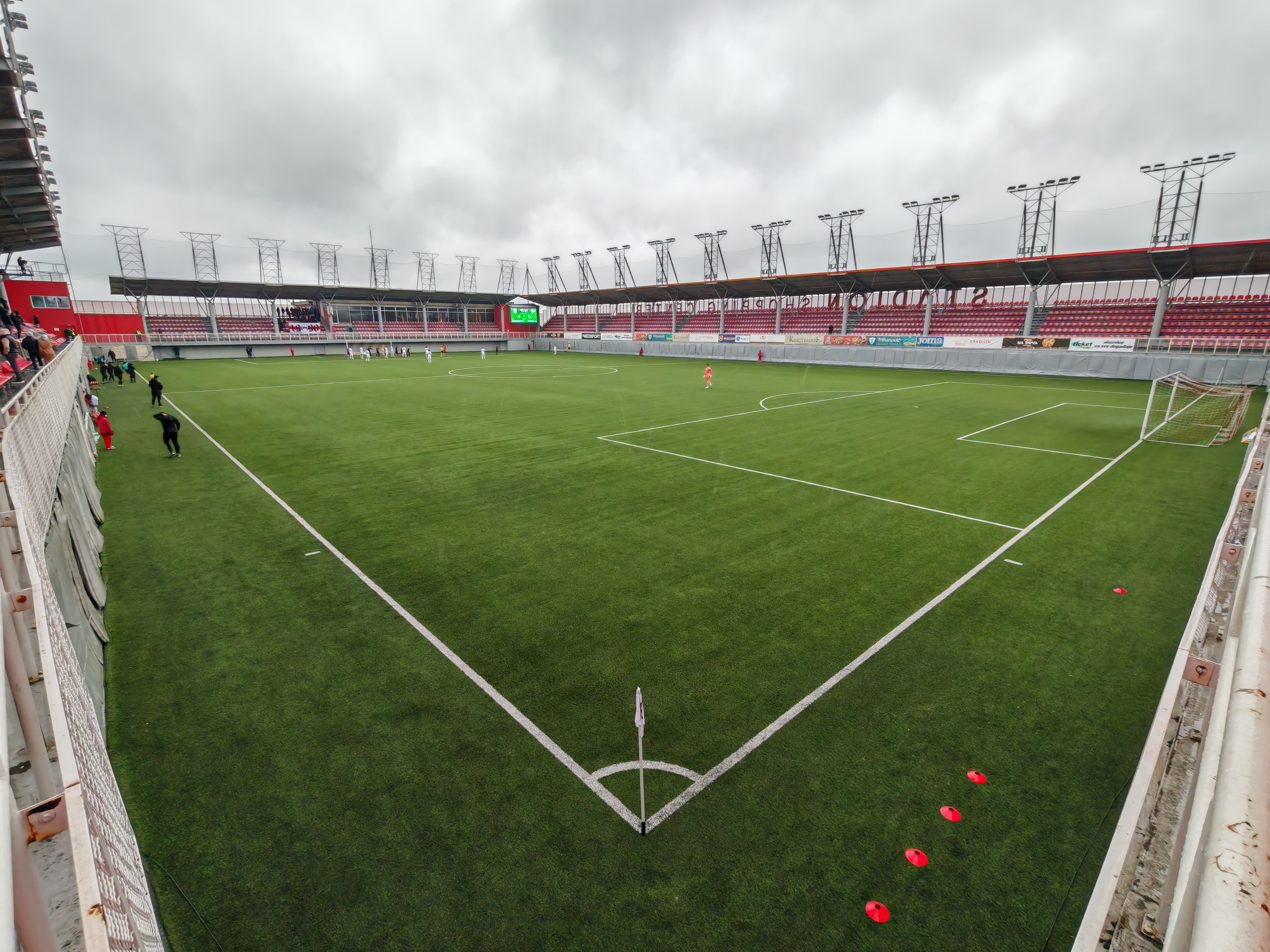
View on the football pitch of Voždovac Stadium from the southwestern corner

== See also ==
- List of football stadiums in Serbia
