= 2017–18 Serbian Cup =

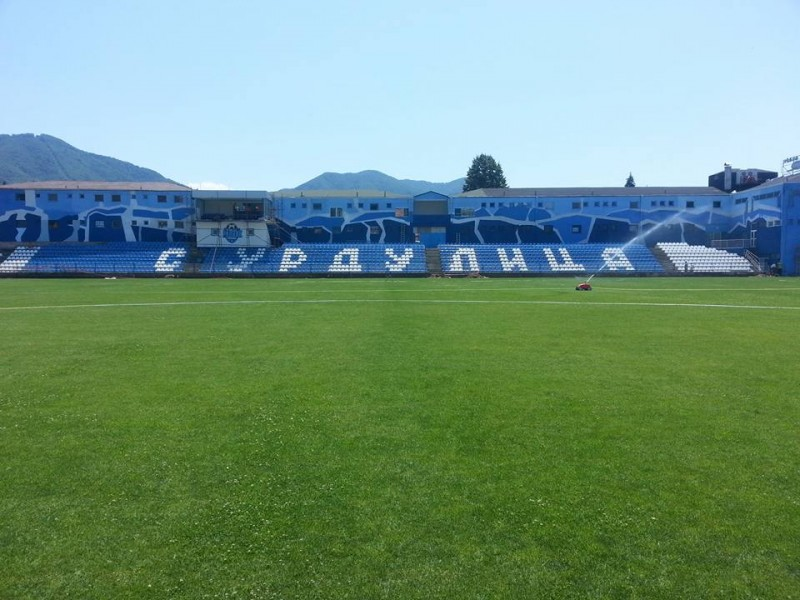
- Surdulica City Stadium hosted the final

Tournament details
- Country: Serbia
- Teams: 37

Final positions
- Champions: Partizan
- Runners-up: Mladost Lučani

The 2017–18 Serbian Cup season was the twelfth season of the Serbian national football cup competition. It started in September 2017, and ended on 23 May 2018. Partizan won the tournament for the sixth time, extending their record as the club with the most wins.

== Calendar ==
Round	Date(s)	Number of fixtures	Clubs	New entries this round
Preliminary round	6 September 2017	5	37 → 32	10
Round of 32	20 September 2017	16	32 → 16	26
Round of 16	25 October 2017	8	16 → 8	none
Quarter-finals	14 March 2018	4	8 → 4	none
Semi-finals	18 April and 9 May 2018	4	4 → 2	none
Final	23 May 2018	1	2 → 1	none

== Preliminary round ==
6 September 2017	Radnički Beograd	0–0 (4–3 p)	OFK Odžaci	Belgrade

6 September 2017	Rtanj	2–2 (5–4 p)	OFK Beograd	Boljevac

6 September 2017	Polet 1980	3–1	Kolubara	Zubin Potok

6 September 2017	Zlatibor	4–1	BSK Borča	Čajetina

6 September 2017	Dinamo 1945	2–0	ČSK	Pančevo

== Round of 32 ==
11 October 2017	Sloboda Užice	1–2	Borac Čačak	Užice

20 September 2017	Javor Ivanjica	2–0	Sinđelić Beograd	Ivanjica

20 September 2017	Budućnost Dobanovci	3–3 (4–2 p)	Voždovac	Dobanovci

20 September 2017	Polet 1980	1–8	Spartak Subotica	Zubin Potok

11 October 2017	Bežanija	0–1	Napredak Kruševac	Belgrade

20 September 2017	Jagodina	0–3	Čukarički	Jagodina

20 September 2017	Mačva Šabac	0–0 (4–2 p)	OFK Bačka	Šabac

11 October 2017	Red Star Belgrade	5–0	Dinamo Vranje	Belgrade

20 September 2017	Dinamo 1945	1–2	Vojvodina	Pančevo

20 September 2017	Radnički Pirot	1–1 (6–5 p)	Novi Pazar	Pirot

20 September 2017	Zlatibor	0–0 (7–6 p)	Radnički Niš	Čajetina

20 September 2017	Radnički Beograd	0–1	Mladost Lučani	Belgrade

20 September 2017	Zemun	0–0 (5–6 p)	Rad	Zemun

11 October 2017	Rtanj	0–3	Partizan	Boljevac

20 September 2017	Metalac Gornji Milanovac	1–2	Proleter Novi Sad	Gornji Milanovac

20 September 2017	Inđija	0–0 (5–4 p)	Radnik Surdulica	Inđija

== Round of 16 ==
25 October 2017	Mladost Lučani	4–0	Proleter Novi Sad	Lučani

25 October 2017	Napredak Kruševac	7–2	Radnički Pirot	Kruševac

25 October 2017	Vojvodina	6–1	Budućnost Dobanovci	Novi Sad

25 October 2017	Inđija	0–3	Javor Ivanjica	Inđija

25 October 2017	Zlatibor	0–1	Čukarički	Čajetina

15 November 2017	Spartak Subotica	1–1 (5–6 p)	Mačva Šabac	Subotica

15 November 2017	Partizan	3–0	Rad	Belgrade

15 November 2017	Borac Čačak	0–4	Red Star Belgrade	Čačak

== Quarter-finals ==
14 March 2018	Javor Ivanjica	0–2	Partizan	Ivanjica Stadium, Ivanjica
13:00			Ožegović 65'; N.R. Miletić 67'	Attendance: 1,500; Referee: Srđan Jovanović

14 March 2018	Mačva Šabac	0–0 (5–4 p)	Red Star Belgrade	Gradski stadion Šabac, Šabac
15:30				Attendance: 5,000; Referee: Dejan Santrač
	Penalties
	Matić (penalty scored); Gavrić (penalty scored); Milinković (penalty scored); Obrovac (penalty scored); Pejović (penalty scored)		Babić (penalty scored); Pešić (penalty scored); Krstičić (penalty scored); Milijaš (penalty scored); Radonjić (penalty missed)

14 March 2018	Vojvodina	0–1	Mladost Lučani	Karađorđe Stadium, Novi Sad
17:00			Trifunović 89'	Attendance: 1,000

14 March 2018	Napredak Kruševac	0–2	Čukarički	Mladost Stadium, Kruševac
			Docić 32'; Bojić 46'

== Semi-finals ==
=== First legs ===
18 April 2018	Čukarički	4–2	Partizan	Čukarički Stadium, Belgrade

18 April 2018	Mačva Šabac	1–1	Mladost Lučani	Gradski stadion Šabac, Šabac

=== Second legs ===
9 May 2018	Partizan	2–0	Čukarički	Partizan Stadium, Belgrade

9 May 2018	Mladost Lučani	4–0	Mačva Šabac	Mladost Stadium, Lučani

== Final ==
23 May 2018	Mladost Lučani	1–2	Partizan	City Stadium, Surdulica
19:00 CEST	Tumbasević 21'		Janković 31'; Zdjelar 62'	Attendance: 3,000; Referee: Majo Vujović
