= 2018–19 Red Star Belgrade season =

2018–19 season
- President: Svetozar Mijailović
- Manager: Vladan Milojević
- Stadium: Rajko Mitić Stadium
- Serbian SuperLiga: 1st
- Serbian Cup: Runners-up
- UEFA Champions League: Group stage
- Top goalscorer: League: Ben (17); All: Ben (25)
- Highest home attendance: 51,318 (vs Liverpool, 6 November 2018)
- Lowest home attendance: 0 (Note: The Red Star Belgrade v Red Bull Salzburg match was played behind closed doors due to punishment by UEFA.) (vs Red Bull Salzburg, 21 August 2018)
- Average home league attendance: 13,566
Home colours	Away colours	Third colours

The 2018–19 season was Red Star's 13th in the Serbian SuperLiga and 73rd consecutive season in the top flight of Yugoslav and Serbian football. The club participated in the Serbian SuperLiga, the Serbian Cup and the UEFA Champions League.

== Pre-season and friendlies ==
25 June 2018 Friendly	Ried (Austria)	0–2	(Serbia) Red Star	Linz, Austria
18:00		Report	Ben 1'; Meleg 13' (pen.)	Stadium: Sportplatz Windischgarsten; Attendance: 200

28 June 2018 Friendly	Red Star (Serbia)	1–0	(Cyprus) Apollon	Linz, Austria
17:00	Sardinero 80' (o.g.)	Report		Stadium: Sportplatz Windischgarsten; Attendance: 50

30 June 2018 Friendly	LASK (Austria)	1–3	(Serbia) Red Star	Linz, Austria
17:00	Ullmann 45' (pen.)	Report	Milić 19', 53'; Jevtović 78' (pen.)	Stadium: Sportplatz Windischgarsten; Attendance: 500

2 July 2018 Friendly	Red Star (Serbia)	1–0	(Czech Republic) Bohemians	Linz, Austria
17:00	Pavkov 90'	Report		Stadium: Sportplatz Windischgarsten; Attendance: 200

22 January 2019 Friendly	Akritas (Cyprus)	1–8	(Serbia) Red Star	Paphos, Cyprus
16:00	Loukaides 83'	Report	Pavkov 3'; Milunović 30'; Cafú 36'; Ebecilio 39'; Hajdin 54'; Babić 59'; Joveljić 72'; Vukanović 89'	Stadium: Stelios Kyriakides Stadium

28 January 2019 Friendly	Red Star (Serbia)	2–0	(Germany) Wacker Nordhausen	Antalya, Turkey
17:00	Hajdin 3'; Jovičić 28'	Report		Stadium: Regnum Stadium

30 January 2019 Friendly	Red Star (Serbia)	3–0	Austria Vienna	Antalya, Turkey
15:00	Ben 24' (pen.); Milunović 47'; Babić 83'	Report		Stadium: Regnum Stadium; Attendance: 200

2 February 2019 Friendly	Red Star (Serbia)	3–1	(Bulgaria) Ludogorets	Antalya, Turkey
15:00	Ben 33'; Boakye 43'; Pavkov 77'	Report	Wanderson 54'	Stadium: Regnum Stadium; Attendance: 300

5 February 2019 Friendly	Red Star (Serbia)	2–1	(North Macedonia) Rabotnički	Antalya, Turkey
15:00	Vukanović 43'; Ebecilio 55'	Report	Blazhevski 41'	Stadium: Regnum Stadium; Attendance: 100

8 February 2019 Friendly	Red Star (Serbia)	1–0	(Slovenia) Maribor	Antalya, Turkey
15:00	Marin 79'	Report		Stadium: Regnum Stadium; Attendance: 200

== Competitions ==
=== Overview ===
Competition	Record							
Competition	P	W	D	L	GF	GA	GD	Win %
Serbian SuperLiga	37	33	3	1	97	20	+77	89.19
Serbian Cup	6	4	1	1	12	4	+8	66.67
UEFA Champions League	14	5	5	4	17	21	−4	35.71
Total	57	42	9	6	126	45	+81	73.68

=== Serbian SuperLiga ===
==== Season results summary ====
Overall								Home						Away					
Pld	W	D	L	GF	GA	GD	Pts	W	D	L	GF	GA	GD	W	D	L	GF	GA	GD
37	33	3	1	97	20	+77	102	18	1	0	53	7	+46	15	2	1	44	13	+31

==== Regular season league table ====
Pos	Team	Pld	W	D	L	GF	GA	GD	Pts	Qualification
1	Red Star Belgrade	30	27	3	0	80	16	+64	84	Qualification for the Championship round
2	Radnički Niš	30	23	6	1	58	17	+41	75	Qualification for the Championship round
3	Partizan	30	15	9	6	45	20	+25	54	Qualification for the Championship round
4	Čukarički	30	15	9	6	48	25	+23	54	Qualification for the Championship round
5	Mladost Lučani	30	13	7	10	39	29	+10	46	Qualification for the Championship round

Source: SuperLiga (in Serbian), Soccerway
Rules for classification: 1) Points; 2) Head-to-head points; 3) Head-to-head goal difference; 4) Head-to-head goals scored; 5) Head-to-head away goals scored (if two teams tied); 6) Goal difference; 7) Goals scored; 8) Fair play ranking; 9) Draw.

==== Regular season result round by round ====
Round	1	2	3	4	5	6	7	8	9	10	11	12	13	14	15	16	17	18	19	20	21	22	23	24	25	26	27	28	29	30
Result	W	W	W	W	W	W	W	W	D	W	W	W	W	W	W	W	D	W	W	W	W	W	W	D	W	W	W	W	W	W
Position	1	1	1	1	1	1	1	1	1	1	1	1	1	1	1	1	1	1	1	1	1	1	1	1	1	1	1	1	1	1

W = Win; D = Draw; L = Loss

==== Regular season matches ====
20 July 2018 R1	Red Star	3–0	Dinamo	Rajko Mitić Stadium, Belgrade
20:00	Jovančić 41'; Joveljić 51'; Jevtović 76'	Report		Attendance: 5,186; Referee: Branko Stojaković

29 July 2018 R2	Red Star	2–0	Radnički	Rajko Mitić Stadium, Belgrade
19:00	Rodić 9'; Ben 90' (pen.)	Report		Attendance: 7,214; Referee: Igor Stojiljković

4 August 2018 R3	Voždovac	1–2	Red Star	Voždovac Stadium, Belgrade
19:00	Duronjić 56'	Report	Simić 2'; Stojiljković 25'	Attendance: 1,000; Referee: Bojan Nikolić

12 August 2018 R4	Red Star	3–0	Spartak	Rajko Mitić Stadium, Belgrade
19:00	Pavkov 42', 68'; Babić 90+3'	Report		Attendance: 5,278; Referee: Nenad Đokić

26 September 2018 R5	Napredak	0–3	Red Star	Mladost Stadium, Kruševac
18:30		Report	Gobeljić 16'; Simić 20'; Jevtović 88'	Attendance: 8,000; Referee: Zoran Široki

25 August 2018 R6	Red Star	2–1	Čukarički	Rajko Mitić Stadium, Belgrade
20:30	Srnić 53'; Gobeljić 71'	Report	Tedić 67'	Attendance: 7,612; Referee: Danilo Grujić

1 September 2018 R7	Vojvodina	1–4	Red Star	Karađorđe Stadium, Novi Sad
19:00	Đuričin 20'	Report	Pavkov 16'; Ben 44' (pen.), 77'; Babić 90+3'	Attendance: 4,000; Referee: Petar Piper

15 September 2018 R8	Red Star	6–0	Radnik	Rajko Mitić Stadium, Belgrade
20:30	Boakye 33', 62'; Marin 42'; Cafú 53'; Čaušić 73'; Stojiljković 82'	Report		Attendance: 13,120; Referee: Nenad Minaković

23 September 2018 R9	Partizan	1–1	Red Star	Partizan Stadium, Belgrade
19:00	Gomes 33'	Report	Boakye 73'	Attendance: 25,000; Referee: Danilo Grujić

30 September 2018 R10	Red Star	2–1	Mladost	Rajko Mitić Stadium, Belgrade
20:30	Cafú 51' (pen.); Jovičić 68'	Report	Jevremović 65'	Attendance: 6,227; Referee: Aleksandar Vasić

6 October 2018 R11	Zemun	1–2	Red Star	Zemun Stadium, Belgrade
13:00	Stojković 10'	Report	Joveljić 45'; Marin 90'	Attendance: 3,500; Referee: Srđan Jovanović

20 October 2018 R12	Red Star	3–1	Rad	Rajko Mitić Stadium, Belgrade
19:00	Boakye 39', 57'; Gobeljić 45'	Report	Marinković 78'	Attendance: 7,315; Referee: Momčilo Marković

27 October 2018 R13	Mačva	0–2	Red Star	Gradski stadion, Šabac
16:30		Report	Pavkov 38'; Jovančić 60'	Attendance: 5,000; Referee: Ilija Brdar

31 October 2018 R14	Red Star	3–1	Bačka	Rajko Mitić Stadium, Belgrade
18:30	Pavkov 1'; Gobeljić 15'; Simić 62'	Report	Radinović 65'	Attendance: 6,128; Referee: Aleksandar Živković

3 November 2018 R15	Proleter	0–2	Red Star	Karađorđe Stadium, Novi Sad
15:00		Report	Andrejević 9' (o.g.); Ben 56'	Attendance: 5,000; Referee: Miloš Đorđić

10 November 2018 R16	Dinamo	0–3	Red Star	Surdulica City Stadium, Surdulica
15:00		Report	Stojiljković 28'; Babić 47'; Simić 56'	Attendance: 2,500; Referee: Nenad Đokić

24 November 2018 R17	Radnički	2–2	Red Star	Čair Stadium, Niš
19:00	Haskić 15'; Ranđelović 26'	Report	Krstičić 6'; Ben 65'	Attendance: 15,000; Referee: Novak Simović

1 December 2018 R18	Red Star	2–0	Voždovac	Rajko Mitić Stadium, Belgrade
18:00	Ebecilio 29'; Ben 33'	Report		Attendance: 8,123; Referee: Petar Piper

5 December 2018 R19	Spartak	1–3	Red Star	Subotica City Stadium, Subotica
16:00	Čečarić 90'	Report	Gobeljić 36'; Ben 41' (pen.), 69'	Attendance: 4,000; Referee: Danilo Grujić

9 December 2018 R20	Red Star	3–0	Napredak	Rajko Mitić Stadium, Belgrade
19:00	Simić 14'; Veškovac 60' (o.g.); Ben 79'	Report		Attendance: 10,218; Referee: Aleksandar Vasić

16 December 2018 R21	Čukarički	1–2	Red Star	Čukarički Stadium, Belgrade
19:30	Stojanović 28'	Report	Ben 24' (pen.); Boakye 30'	Attendance: 1,200; Referee: Lazar Lukić

16 February 2019 R22	Red Star	4–0	Vojvodina	Rajko Mitić Stadium, Belgrade
16:00	Boakye 24'; Simić 28'; Boakye 68'; Pavkov 89'	Report		Attendance: 22,364; Referee: Milan Ilić

23 February 2019 R23	Radnik	0–1	Red Star	Surdulica City Stadium, Surdulica
17:00		Report	Gajić 8'	Attendance: 3,000; Referee: Petar Piper

2 March 2019 R24	Red Star	1–1	Partizan	Rajko Mitić Stadium, Belgrade
18:00	Pavkov 74'	Report	Nikolić 36'	Attendance: 35,000; Referee: Danilo Grujić

6 March 2019 R25	Mladost	1–3	Red Star	Mladost Stadium, Lučani
16:00	Bojić 55'	Report	Ben 15' (pen.); Pavkov 29'; Marin 70'	Attendance: 6,000; Referee: Miloš Đorđić

9 March 2019 R26	Red Star	4–0	Zemun	Rajko Mitić Stadium, Belgrade
18:00	Marin 32' (pen.); Joveljić 42'; Pavkov 53' (pen.); Zlatković 67' (o.g.)	Report		Attendance: 21,318; Referee: Jovan Šegrt

17 March 2019 R27	Rad	0–3	Red Star	King Peter I Stadium, Belgrade
17:00		Report	Joveljić 21', 53'; Ben 87'	Attendance: 2,000; Referee: Ilija Brdar

30 March 2019 R28	Red Star	2–1	Mačva	Rajko Mitić Stadium, Belgrade
19:00	Boakye 37'; Ben 75' (pen.)	Report	Gigić 37'	Attendance: 10,122; Referee: Zoran Široki

3 April 2019 R29	Bačka	1–3	Red Star	Stadion Slavko Maletin Vava, Bačka Palanka
17:00	Radović 15'	Report	Pavkov 7'; Savić 11'; Stojković 61'	Attendance: 5,500; Referee: Dragan Čolović

7 April 2019 R30	Red Star	4–0	Proleter	Rajko Mitić Stadium, Belgrade
19:00	Boakye 35', 82'; Marin 68'; Ivanić 76'	Report		Attendance: 8,563; Referee: Novica Anđelovski

==== Championship round league table ====
Pos	Team	Pld	W	D	L	GF	GA	GD	Pts	Qualification
1	Red Star Belgrade (C)	37	33	3	1	97	20	+77	60	Qualification for the Champions League first qualifying round
2	Radnički Niš	37	25	10	2	71	30	+41	48	Qualification for the Europa League first qualifying round
3	Partizan	37	20	9	8	58	28	+30	42	Qualification for the Europa League second qualifying round (Note: Partizan qualified for the Europa League second qualifying round by winning the 2018–19 Serbian Cup. As a result, the spot awarded to the third-placed team (Europa League first qualifying round) was passed to the fourth-placed team.)
4	Čukarički	37	18	12	7	63	36	+27	39	Qualification for the Europa League first qualifying round
5	Mladost Lučani	37	16	9	12	49	37	+12	34	

Source: SuperLiga (in Serbian), Soccerway
Rules for classification: 1) Points; 2) Head-to-head points; 3) Head-to-head goal difference; 4) Head-to-head goals scored; 5) Head-to-head away goals scored (if two teams tied); 6) Goal difference; 7) Goals scored; 8) Fair play ranking; 9) Draw.
(C) Champions

==== Championship round result round by round ====
Round	1	2	3	4	5	6	7
Result	W	L	W	W	W	W	W
Position	1	1	1	1	1	1	1

W = Win; D = Draw; L = Loss

==== Championship round matches ====
13 April 2019 R31	Red Star	3–0	Radnički	Rajko Mitić Stadium, Belgrade
18:00	Boakye 23' (pen.), 48'; Ben 45' (pen.)	Report		Attendance: 13,150; Referee: Novak Simović

20 April 2019 R32	Čukarički	3–2	Red Star	Čukarički Stadium, Belgrade
17:00	Mudrinski 22', 67'; Stojanović 38'	Report	Marin 7'; Ben 19' (pen.)	Attendance: 3,000; Referee: Igor Stojiljković

25 April 2019 R33	Red Star	2–1	Partizan	Rajko Mitić Stadium, Belgrade
19:00	Ben 60' (pen.); Vukanović 80'	Report	Gomes 90' (pen.)	Attendance: 21,862; Referee: Novak Simović

1 May 2019 R34	Vojvodina	0–5	Red Star	Karađorđe Stadium, Novi Sad
16:00		Report	Pavkov 22'; Vukanović 25'; Ben 65'; Joveljić 77', 90' (pen.)	Attendance: 3,000; Referee: Miloš Milanović

5 May 2019 R35	Red Star	1–0	Mladost	Rajko Mitić Stadium, Belgrade
18:00	Pavkov 83'	Report		Attendance: 7,812; Referee: Petar Piper

10 May 2019 R36	Proleter	0–1	Red Star	Karađorđe Stadium, Novi Sad
18:00		Report	Jevtović 75'	Attendance: 8,000; Referee: Lazar Tripković

19 May 2019 R37	Red Star	3–0	Napredak	Rajko Mitić Stadium, Belgrade
19:00	Joveljić 12'; Jevtović 56'; Ebecilio 89'	Report		Attendance: 41,142; Referee: Bojan Nikolić

=== Serbian Cup ===
==== First round ====
17 October 2018 R1	Dinamo Vranje	0–2	Red Star	Stadion Yumco, Vranje
14:00		Report	Stojiljković 15'; Joveljić 61'	Attendance: 5,000; Referee: Novak Simović

==== Second round ====
21 November 2018 R2	Red Star	4–1	TSC Bačka Topola	Rajko Mitić Stadium, Belgrade
15:00	Simić 38', 72'; Stojiljković 50'; Joveljić 90+4' (pen.)	Report	Sumaila 52' (o.g.)	Attendance: 2,500; Referee: Miroslav Stojanović

==== Quarterfinal ====
13 March 2019 QF	Red Star	2–1	Radnik Surdulica	Rajko Mitić Stadium, Belgrade
18:00	Ivanić 17'; Ben 44'	Report	Zlatanović 90+1' (pen.)	Attendance: 5,000; Referee: Bojan Nikolić

==== Semifinal ====
16 April 2019 SF1	Red Star	4–1	Mladost Lučani	Rajko Mitić Stadium, Belgrade
17:00	Joveljić 12'; Milunović 57'; Pavkov 60'; Ivanić 68'	Report	Dimić 53'	Attendance: 3,183; Referee: Bojan Nikolić

15 May 2019 SF2	Mladost Lučani	0–0 (1–4 agg.)	Red Star	Mladost Stadium, Lučani
17:30		Report		Attendance: 3,000; Referee: Petar Piper

==== Final ====
23 May 2019 F	Red Star	0–1	Partizan	Rajko Mitić Stadium, Belgrade
19:00		Report	Ostojić 14'	Attendance: 17,500; Referee: Novak Simović

=== UEFA Champions League ===
==== First qualifying round ====
11 July 2018 QR1	Spartaks Jūrmala (Latvia)	0–0	(Serbia) Red Star	Skonto Stadium, Riga (Note: Spartaks Jūrmala will play their home matches at Skonto Stadium, Riga, instead of their regular stadium Slokas Stadium, Jūrmala.)
18:00 (19:00 EEST)		Report		Attendance: 4,000; Referee: Mykola Balakin (Ukraine)

17 July 2018 QR1	Red Star (Serbia)	2–0 (2-0 agg.)	(Latvia) Spartaks Jūrmala	Rajko Mitić Stadium, Belgrade
20:30	Ben 78'; Krstičić 81'	Report		Attendance: 23,868; Referee: Alper Ulusoy (Turkey)

==== Second qualifying round ====
24 July 2018 QR2	Red Star (Serbia)	3–0	(Lithuania) Sūduva Marijampolė	Rajko Mitić Stadium, Belgrade
20:30	Ebecilio 23'; Radonjić 35', 58'	Report		Attendance: 23,218; Referee: Bastian Dankert (Germany)

1 August 2018 QR2	Sūduva Marijampolė (Lithuania)	0–2 (0–5 agg.)	(Serbia) Red Star	Sūduva Stadium, Marijampolė
19:30 (20:30 EEST)		Report	Ben 8'; Radonjić 38'	Attendance: 6,000; Referee: Tiago Martins (Portugal)

==== Third qualifying round ====
7 August 2018 QR3	Red Star (Serbia)	1–1	(Slovakia) Spartak Trnava	Rajko Mitić Stadium, Belgrade
20:30	Ben 23' (pen.)	Report	Grendel 25'	Attendance: 37,112; Referee: Carlos del Cerro Grande (Spain)

14 August 2018 QR3	Spartak Trnava (Slovakia)	1–2 (a.e.t.) (2–3 agg.)	(Serbia) Red Star	Štadión Antona Malatinského, Trnava
20:30	Bakoš 6'	Report	Ben 7'; Radonjić 98'	Attendance: 18,032; Referee: Serdar Gözübüyük (Netherlands)

==== Play-off round ====
21 August 2018 PO	Red Star (Serbia)	0–0	(Austria) Red Bull Salzburg	Rajko Mitić Stadium, Belgrade
21:00		Report		Attendance: 0 Referee: Daniele Orsato (Italy)

29 August 2018 PO	Red Bull Salzburg (Austria)	2–2 (2–2 (a) agg.)	(Serbia) Red Star	Red Bull Arena, Wals-Siezenheim
21:00	Dabour 45', 48' (pen.)	Report	Ben 65', 66'	Attendance: 26,500; Referee: Cüneyt Çakır (Turkey)

==== Group stage ====
Pos	Team	Pld	W	D	L	GF	GA	GD	Pts	Qualification
1	(France) Paris Saint-Germain	6	3	2	1	17	9	+8	11	Advance to knockout phase
2	(England) Liverpool	6	3	0	3	9	7	+2	9 (Note: Goals in all group matches: Liverpool 9, Napoli 7.)	Advance to knockout phase
3	(Italy) Napoli	6	2	3	1	7	5	+2	9	Transfer to Europa League
4	(Serbia) Red Star Belgrade	6	1	1	4	5	17	−12	4	

Source: UEFA
Rules for classification: Group stage tiebreakers
Notes:

18 September 2018 MD1	Red Star (Serbia)	0–0	(Italy) Napoli	Rajko Mitić Stadium, Belgrade
21:00		Report		Attendance: 49,112; Referee: Szymon Marciniak (Poland)

3 October 2018 MD2	Paris Saint-Germain (France)	6–1	(Serbia) Red Star Belgrade	Parc des Princes, Paris
18:55	Neymar 20', 22', 81'; Cavani 37'; Di María 42'; Mbappé 70'	Report	Marin 74'	Attendance: 39,979; Referee: Artur Soares Dias (Portugal)

24 October 2018 MD3	Liverpool (England)	4–0	(Serbia) Red Star	Anfield, Liverpool
21:00	Firmino 20'; Salah 45', 51' (pen.); Mané 80'	Report		Attendance: 53,024; Referee: Daniel Siebert (Germany)

6 November 2018 MD4	Red Star (Serbia)	2–0	(England) Liverpool	Rajko Mitić Stadium, Belgrade
18:55	Pavkov 22', 29'	Report		Attendance: 51,318; Referee: Antonio Mateu Lahoz (Spain)

28 November 2018 MD5	Napoli (Italy)	3–1	(Serbia) Red Star	Stadio San Paolo, Naples
21:00	Hamšík 11'; Mertens 33', 52'	Report	Ben 57'	Attendance: 44,470; Referee: Jesús Gil Manzano (Spain)

11 December 2018 MD6	Red Star (Serbia)	1–4	(France) Paris Saint-Germain	Rajko Mitić Stadium, Belgrade
21:00	Gobeljić 56'	Report	Cavani 10'; Neymar 40'; Marquinhos 74'; Mbappé 90+2'	Attendance: 48,357; Referee: Willie Collum (Scotland)

== Squad ==
=== Squad statistics ===
No.	Name	League		Cup		Champions League		Total		Discipline	
No.	Name	Apps	Goals	Apps	Goals	Apps	Goals	Apps	Goals	Yellow card	Red card
Goalkeepers
1	(Serbia) Zoran Popović	10	0	2	0	0	0	12	0	0	0
27	(Bosnia and Herzegovina) Nemanja Supić	0	0	0	0	0	0	0	0	0	0
82	(Canada) Milan Borjan	28	0	4	0	14	0	46	0	4	0
Defenders
2	(Serbia) Milan Gajić	11	1	1	0	0	0	12	1	0	0
15	(Serbia) Srđan Babić	21	3	5	0	6	0	32	3	9	0
19	(Serbia) Nemanja Milunović	12	0	4	1	0	0	16	1	2	0
23	(Serbia) Milan Rodić	18	1	3	0	13	0	34	1	2	0
30	(Montenegro) Filip Stojković	23	1	3	0	13	0	39	1	11	0
34	(Serbia) Stefan Hajdin	6	0	2	0	0	0	8	0	1	0
37	(Ghana) Rashid Sumaila	3	0	2	0	0	0	5	0	1	0
77	(Serbia) Marko Gobeljić	25	5	5	0	8	1	38	6	6	1
90	(Serbia) Vujadin Savić	19	1	1	0	11	0	31	1	3	0
Midfielders
3	(Serbia) Branko Jovičić	24	1	4	0	12	0	40	1	6	0
7	(Serbia) Miloš Vulić	5	0	3	0	0	0	8	0	0	0
8	(Montenegro) Mirko Ivanić	14	1	4	2	0	0	18	3	0	0
10	(Serbia) Nenad Milijaš	7	0	1	0	0	0	8	0	0	0
11	(Netherlands) Lorenzo Ebecilio	19	2	2	0	9	1	30	3	0	0
17	(Germany) Marko Marin	22	6	4	0	5	1	31	7	3	0
20	(Serbia) Goran Čaušić	21	1	2	0	5	0	28	1	1	0
21	(Serbia) Veljko Simić	26	6	4	2	9	0	39	8	1	0
29	(Serbia) Dušan Jovančić	27	2	3	0	10	0	40	2	8	0
33	(Serbia) Milan Jevtović	10	4	1	0	2	0	13	4	0	0
36	(Slovakia) Erik Jirka	6	0	1	0	0	0	7	0	1	0
Forwards
9	(Serbia) Milan Pavkov	27	12	4	1	8	2	39	15	7	0
22	(Brazil) Jonathan Cafu	7	2	1	0	1	0	9	2	0	0
28	(Serbia) Dejan Joveljić	17	8	5	3	2	0	24	11	1	0
31	(Comoros) Ben	24	17	4	1	14	7	42	25	3	0
92	(Serbia) Aleksa Vukanović	10	2	3	0	0	0	13	2	0	0
99	(Ghana) Richmond Boakye	15	13	0	0	3	0	18	13	0	0
Players sold or loaned out during the season
DF	(Australia) Miloš Degenek	20	0	0	0	13	0	33	0	4	0
DF	(Serbia) Aleksa Terzić	2	0	0	0	0	0	2	0	0	0
MF	(Serbia) Nenad Krstičić	13	1	1	0	13	1	27	2	6	0
MF	(Serbia) Dejan Meleg	5	0	1	0	1	0	7	0	0	0
MF	(Serbia) Nemanja Milić	5	0	0	0	6	0	11	0	0	0
MF	(Serbia) Nemanja Radonjić	0	0	0	0	8	4	8	4	2	0
MF	(Serbia) Slavoljub Srnić	9	1	2	0	5	0	16	1	0	0
FW	(Serbia) Nikola Stojiljković	7	3	2	2	6	0	15	5	1	0

As of 23 May 2019

=== Goalscorers ===
Includes all competitive matches. The list is sorted by shirt number when total goals are equal.

As of 19 May 2019

Rank	Pos	No.	Player	League	Cup	Champions League	Total
1	FW	31	(Comoros) Ben	17	1	7	25
2	FW	9	(Serbia) Milan Pavkov	12	1	2	15
3	FW	99	(Ghana) Richmond Boakye	13	0	0	13
4	FW	28	(Serbia) Dejan Joveljić	8	3	0	11
5	MF	21	(Serbia) Veljko Simić	6	2	0	8
6	MF	17	(Germany) Marko Marin	6	0	1	7
7	DF	77	(Serbia) Marko Gobeljić	5	0	1	6
8	FW	19	(Serbia) Nikola Stojiljković	3	2	0	5
9	MF	49	(Serbia) Nemanja Radonjić	0	0	4	4
9	MF	33	(Serbia) Milan Jevtović	4	0	0	4
11	MF	8	(Montenegro) Mirko Ivanić	1	2	0	3
11	MF	11	(Netherlands) Lorenzo Ebecilio	2	0	1	3
11	DF	15	(Serbia) Srđan Babić	3	0	0	3
14	MF	7	(Serbia) Nenad Krstičić	1	0	1	2
14	FW	22	(Brazil) Jonathan Cafú	2	0	0	2
14	MF	29	(Serbia) Dušan Jovančić	2	0	0	2
14	FW	92	(Serbia) Aleksa Vukanović	2	0	0	2
18	DF	2	(Serbia) Milan Gajić	1	0	0	1
18	MF	3	(Serbia) Branko Jovičić	1	0	0	1
18	MF	14	(Serbia) Slavoljub Srnić	1	0	0	1
18	MF	19	(Serbia) Nemanja Milunović	0	1	0	1
18	MF	20	(Serbia) Goran Čaušić	1	0	0	1
18	DF	23	(Serbia) Milan Rodić	1	0	0	1
18	MF	30	(Montenegro) Filip Stojković	1	0	0	1
18	DF	90	(Serbia) Vujadin Savić	1	0	0	1
Own goals				3	0	0	3
TOTALS				97	12	17	126

=== Clean sheets ===
Includes all competitive matches. The list is sorted by shirt number when total clean sheets are equal.

As of 19 May 2019

Rank	No.	Player	League	Cup	Champions League	Total
1	82	(Canada) Milan Borjan	14	1	7	22
2	1	(Serbia) Zoran Popović	7	1	0	8
TOTALS			21	2	7	30

== Transfers ==
=== In ===
#	Pos.	Player	Transferred from	Date	Fee
29	MF	(Serbia) Dušan Jovančić	(Serbia) Vojvodina	29 May 2018	Free
8	MF	(Serbia) Dejan Meleg	(Turkey) Kayserispor	11 June 2018	Undisclosed(~ €300,000)
19	FW	(Serbia) Nikola Stojiljković	(Portugal) Braga	15 June 2018	Loan
33	MF	(Serbia) Milan Jevtović	(Turkey) Antalyaspor	22 June 2018	Free
1	GK	(Serbia) Zoran Popović	(Norway) Bodø/Glimt	26 June 2018	Undisclosed(~ €80,000)
37	DF	(Ghana) Rashid Sumaila	(Kuwait) Qadsia	28 June 2018	Loan
11	MF	(Netherlands) Lorenzo Ebecilio	(Cyprus) APOEL	29 June 2018	Undisclosed(~ €600,000)
5	DF	(Australia) Miloš Degenek	(Japan) Yokohama Marinos	5 July 2018	Undisclosed(~ €200,000)
21	MF	(Serbia) Veljko Simić	(Serbia) Zemun	30 July 2018	Undisclosed(~ €200,000)
22	FW	(Brazil) Jonathan Cafu	(France) Bordeaux	10 August 2018	Loan
	GK	(Serbia) Miloš Čupić	(Serbia) OFK Beograd	15 August 2018	Undisclosed(~ €20,000)
17	MF	(Germany) Marko Marin	(Greece) Olympiacos	31 August 2018	Undisclosed(~ €750,000)
20	MF	(Serbia) Goran Čaušić	(Russia) Arsenal Tula	31 August 2018	Undisclosed(~ €1,000,000)
99	FW	(Ghana) Richmond Boakye	(China) Jiangsu Suning	31 August 2018	Undisclosed(~ €2,500,000)
36	MF	(Slovakia) Erik Jirka	(Slovakia) Spartak Trnava	3 September 2018	Undisclosed(~ €800,000)
19	DF	(Serbia) Nemanja Milunović	(Belarus) BATE Borisov	20 December 2018	Free
7	MF	(Serbia) Miloš Vulić	(Serbia) Napredak Kruševac	21 December 2018	Undisclosed(~ €200,000)
	FW	(Serbia) Dejan Vidić	(Serbia) Zlatibor Čajetina	31 December 2018	Undisclosed
	FW	(North Macedonia) Strahinja Krstevski	(Bulgaria) Lokomotiv Sofia	16 January 2019	Free
92	FW	(Serbia) Aleksa Vukanović	(Serbia) Napredak Kruševac	18 January 2019	Undisclosed(~ €350,000)
2	DF	(Serbia) Milan Gajić	(France) Bordeaux	4 February 2019	Free
8	MF	(Montenegro) Mirko Ivanić	(Belarus) BATE Borisov	8 February 2019	Undisclosed(~ €1,300,000)
	FW	(Montenegro) Nikola Krstović	(Montenegro) Zeta	25 February 2019	Undisclosed

=== Out ===
#	Pos.	Player	Transferred to	Date	Fee
33	DF	(Serbia) Dušan Anđelković	–	19 May 2018	Retired
11	MF	(Serbia) Luka Adžić	(Belgium) Anderlecht	23 May 2018	Undisclosed (~ €800,000)
1	GK	(Serbia) Damir Kahriman	(Greece) Iraklis	11 June 2018	Free
4	MF	(France) Damien Le Tallec	(France) Montpellier	11 June 2018	Free
20	MF	(Netherlands) Mitchell Donald	(Turkey) Malatyaspor	11 June 2018	Free
40	MF	(Serbia) Luka Ilić	(England) Manchester City	11 June 2018	Loan return
6	MF	(Serbia) Uroš Račić	(Spain) Valencia	14 June 2018	Undisclosed (~ €2,200,000)
5	DF	(Ghana) Abraham Frimpong	(Hungary) Ferencvárosi	17 June 2018	Undisclosed (~ €300,000)
98	FW	(Serbia) Vanja Vučićević	(Russia) Krylia Sovetov	27 June 2018	Free
41	GK	(Serbia) Jovan Vićić	(Serbia) Mačva Šabac	29 June 2018	Free
24	DF	(Serbia) Slađan Rakić	(Serbia) Spartak	4 July 2018	Free
45	FW	(Serbia) Aleksandar Pešić	(Saudi Arabia) Al-Ittihad	10 July 2018	Undisclosed (~ €4,200,000)
	GK	(Serbia) Vojkan Damnjanović	(Serbia) Partizan	11 July 2018	Free
	MF	(Serbia) Damjan Gojkov	(Serbia) Vojvodina	18 July 2018	Free
	DF	(Serbia) Aleksandar Kostić	(Serbia) Bačka BP	18 July 2018	Free
	MF	(Serbia) Andrija Luković	(Serbia) Voždovac	19 July 2018	Free
	FW	(Serbia) Milan Senić	(Germany) Düsseldorf-West	25 July 2018	Free
21	MF	(Serbia) Filip Bainović	(Serbia) Rad	25 July 2018	Free
	FW	(Bosnia and Herzegovina) Milan Savić	(Belgium) Mechelen	7 August 2018	Free
	MF	(Serbia) Blagota Marković	(Serbia) Zemun	17 August 2018	Free
	MF	(Serbia) Andrija Crnadak	(Serbia) Zvezdara	17 August 2018	Free
	MF	(Serbia) Miodrag Maljković	(Serbia) Trayal	17 August 2018	Free
	–	(Serbia) Stefan Trimanović	(Serbia) Mačva Šabac	17 August 2018	Free
	MF	(Serbia) Nikola Puzić	(Serbia) Mačva Bogatić	22 August 2018	Free
	FW	(Serbia) Aleksandar Bogdanović	–	24 August 2018	Released
	DF	(Serbia) Draško Đorđević	(Saudi Arabia) Al-Mujazzal	24 August 2018	Free
	FW	(Serbia) Lazar Romanić	(Greece) Lamia	30 August 2018	Free
49	FW	(Serbia) Nemanja Radonjić	(France) Olympique de Marseille	30 August 2018	Undisclosed (~ €12,000,000)
	MF	(Serbia) Viktor Živojinović	–	1 September 2018	Released
	MF	(Bosnia and Herzegovina) Jovan Ilić	(Serbia) Brodarac	1 September 2018	Free
	–	(Serbia) Mihailo Aćimović	(Serbia) Brodarac	1 September 2018	Free
	–	(Serbia) Marko Đurić	(Serbia) Žarkovo	1 September 2018	Free
7	MF	(Serbia) Nenad Krstičić	(Greece) AEK Athens	26 December 2018	€500,000
16	MF	(Serbia) Nemanja Milić	(Belarus) BATE Borisov	27 December 2018	Undisclosed (~ €300,000)
5	DF	(Australia) Miloš Degenek	(Saudi Arabia) Al-Hilal	12 January 2019	€3,600,000
19	FW	(Serbia) Nikola Stojiljković	(Portugal) Braga	19 January 2019	Loan return
	MF	(Bosnia and Herzegovina) Stefan Kovač	(Serbia) Čukarički	21 January 2019	Free
	FW	(Serbia) Radivoj Bosić	(Serbia) Partizan	24 January 2019	Free
14	MF	(Serbia) Slavoljub Srnić	(Spain) Las Palmas	29 January 2019	€300,000

=== Loan returns and promotions ===
#	Position	Player	Returned from	Date
25	DF	(Serbia) Strahinja Eraković	Promoted from youth	11 June 2018
51	GK	(Serbia) Miloš Gordić	Promoted from youth	11 June 2018
93	DF	(Serbia) Aleksa Terzić	(Serbia) Grafičar	11 June 2018
40	MF	(Serbia) Stefan Cvetković	(Serbia) Grafičar	11 June 2018
	GK	(Serbia) Ilija Ćatić	(Serbia) Grafičar	11 June 2018
	DF	(Serbia) Bogdan Račić	(Serbia) Sremac Vojka	11 June 2018
	FW	(Serbia) Stefan Vudragović	(Serbia) Grafičar	11 June 2018
	FW	(Serbia) Lazar Romanić	(Serbia) Borac Čačak	11 June 2018
	MF	(Serbia) Blagota Marković	(Serbia) Grafičar	17 August 2018
	MF	(Serbia) Andrija Crnadak	(Serbia) Grafičar	17 August 2018
	DF	(Serbia) Draško Đorđević	(Serbia) Bežanija	17 August 2018
	MF	(Serbia) Nikola Puzić	(Serbia) Grafičar	22 August 2018
	GK	(Serbia) Strahinja Savić	(Serbia) Sopot	1 September 2018
36	MF	(Slovakia) Erik Jirka	(Slovakia) Spartak Trnava	11 January 2019
	MF	(Bosnia and Herzegovina) Stefan Kovač	(Serbia) IMT	18 January 2019
	MF	(Serbia) Stefan Cvetković	(Serbia) Bačka BP	18 January 2019
44	DF	(Brazil) Zé Marcos	(Serbia) Rad	20 January 2019

=== Loan out ===
#	Position	Player	Loaned to	Date
	GK	(Serbia) Miloš Čupić	(Serbia) Zlatibor Čajetina	16 August 2018
	FW	(Serbia) Radivoj Bosić	(Serbia) Grafičar	24 August 2018
	MF	(Russia) Maksim Lada	(Serbia) Grafičar	24 August 2018
40	MF	(Serbia) Stefan Cvetković	(Serbia) Bačka BP	28 August 2018
	FW	(Serbia) Nikola Veselinović	(Serbia) Jedinstvo Užice	29 August 2018
32	GK	(Serbia) Aleksandar Stanković	(Serbia) Grafičar	1 September 2018
	DF	(Serbia) Nemanja Stojić	(Serbia) Grafičar	1 September 2018
17	MF	(Serbia) Veljko Nikolić	(Serbia) Grafičar	1 September 2018
73	FW	(Serbia) Jug Stanojev	(Serbia) Grafičar	1 September 2018
	–	(Serbia) Vukan Đorđević	(Serbia) Grafičar	1 September 2018
	DF	(Serbia) Marko Janković	(Serbia) Grafičar	1 September 2018
	MF	(Bosnia and Herzegovina) Stefan Santrač	(Serbia) Grafičar	1 September 2018
	–	(Serbia) Damjan Drinčić	(Serbia) Grafičar	1 September 2018
	GK	(Serbia) Strahinja Savić	(Serbia) Grafičar	1 September 2018
	MF	(Serbia) Željko Gavrić	(Serbia) Grafičar	1 September 2018
	DF	(Serbia) Marko Kojić	(Serbia) Grafičar	1 September 2018
	DF	(Serbia) Marko Konatar	(Serbia) Grafičar	1 September 2018
	DF	(Serbia) Ranko Jokić	(Serbia) Grafičar	1 September 2018
	MF	(Serbia) Miloš Nikolić	(Serbia) Grafičar	1 September 2018
	MF	(Bosnia and Herzegovina) Stefan Kovač	(Serbia) IMT	1 September 2018
44	DF	(Brazil) Zé Marcos	(Serbia) Rad	1 September 2018
	FW	(Ghana) Ibrahim Tanko	(Serbia) Bežanija	1 September 2018
36	MF	(Slovakia) Erik Jirka	(Slovakia) Spartak Trnava	3 September 2018
	FW	(North Macedonia) Strahinja Krstevski	(Serbia) Grafičar	16 January 2019
	FW	(Serbia) Dejan Vidić	(Serbia) Zemun	18 January 2019
8	MF	(Serbia) Dejan Meleg	(Greece) Levadiakos	25 January 2019
93	DF	(Serbia) Aleksa Terzić	(Serbia) Grafičar	3 February 2019
44	DF	(Brazil) Zé Marcos	(Montenegro) OFK Grbalj	11 February 2019
	FW	(Montenegro) Nikola Krstović	(Montenegro) Zeta	25 February 2019

== See also ==
- 2018–19 KK Crvena zvezda season
