= Aleksa Terzić =

Serbian footballer (born 1999)

Aleksa Terzić Алекса Терзић
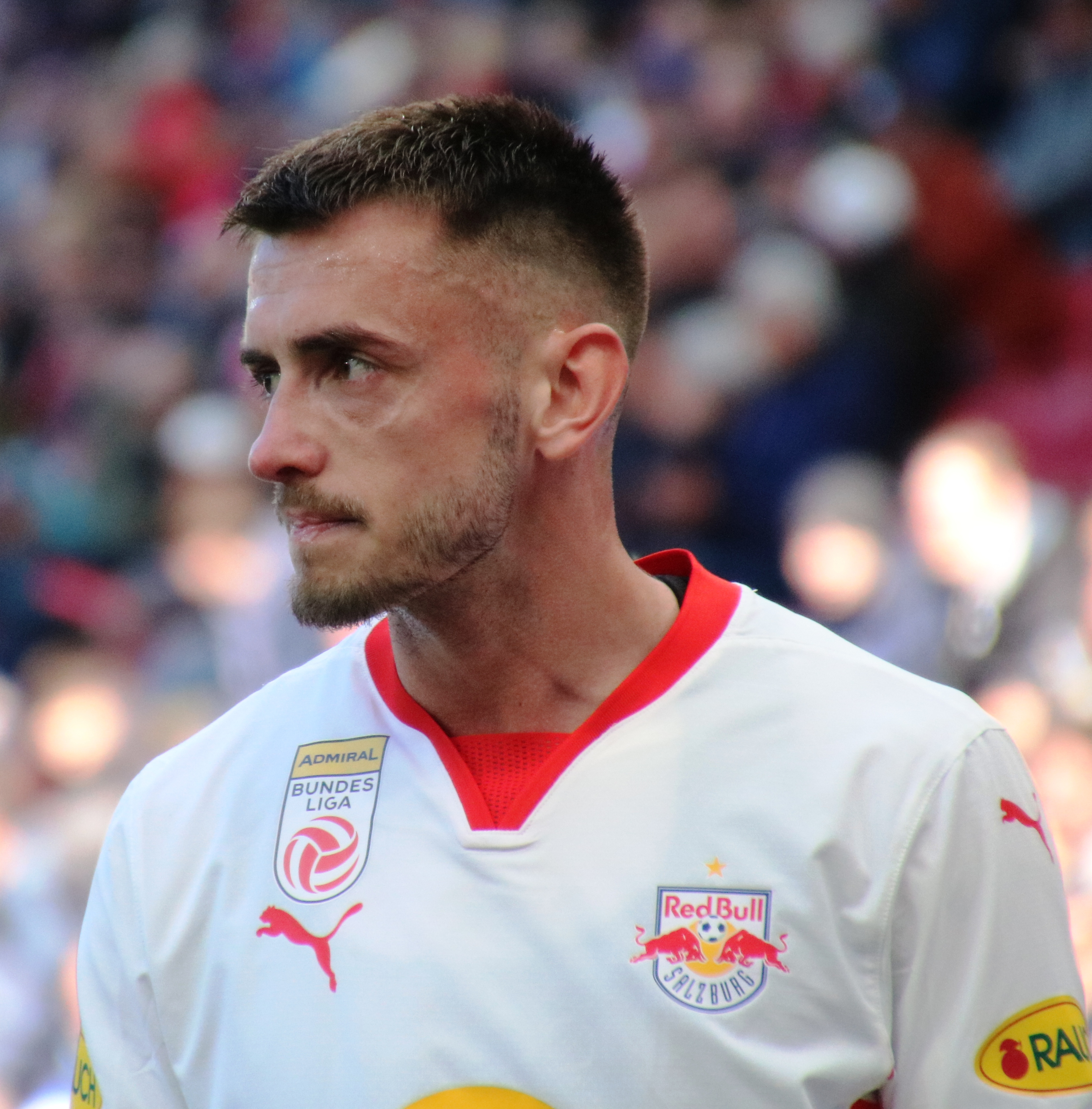
- Terzić with Red Bull Salzburg in 2025

Personal information
- Date of birth: 17 August 1999 (age 27)
- Place of birth: Belgrade, FR Yugoslavia
- Height: 1.84 m (6 ft 0 in)
- Position: Left-back

Team information
- Current team: Frosinone
- Number: 71

Youth career
- –2010: Mladenovac
- 2010–2017: Red Star Belgrade

Senior career*
Years	Team	Apps	(Gls)
2017–2019	Red Star Belgrade	2	(0)
2018	→ Grafičar Beograd (loan)	10	(0)
2019–2023	Fiorentina	38	(1)
2020–2021	→ Empoli (loan)	21	(0)
2023–2026	Red Bull Salzburg	61	(0)
2026–	Frosinone	4	(1)

International career^{‡}
2015	Serbia U16	1	(0)
2015−2016	Serbia U17	10	(0)
2016−2017	Serbia U18	8	(1)
2016−2018	Serbia U19	19	(1)
2018–2019	Serbia U21	9	(1)
2021–	Serbia	18	(1)
- * Club domestic league appearances and goals as of 15:44, 26 October 2026 (UTC) ‡ National team caps and goals as of 23:00, 4 October 2026 (UTC)

Aleksa Terzić (Serbian Cyrillic: Алекса Терзић; born 17 August 1999) is a Serbian professional footballer who plays as a left-back for Serie A club Frosinone and the Serbia national team.

== Club career ==
=== Red Star Belgrade ===
Born in Belgrade, Terzić grew up in Mladenovac, where he also started playing football in the local club. In 2010, he moved to Red Star Belgrade, and passed the whole youth categories. He signed his first, three-year professional contract in November 2016. In early 2017, he was marked as one of the top club's prospects by general director Zvezdan Terzić. He was licensed for the 2017–18 season with first squad, and played with youth team until team until the end of a calendar year respectively. In early 2018, after training with senior squad during the winter-break, Terzić moved on loan to the Serbian League Belgrade side Grafičar Beograd for the rest of season. Following the end of the League Belgrade campaign, in which he made 10 appearances with the satellite club, Terzić returned to Red Star in June 2018.

During the summer pre-season, while Milan Rodić was with national team at the 2018 FIFA World Cup, Tezić got split playing time with Stefan Hajdin as a left-back. At the beginning of the 2018–19 season, Terzić has been licensed for the 2018–19 UEFA Champions League qualifications. After he missed both of matches against Spartaks Jūrmala in the first round, Terzić played a full-time match against Dinamo Vranje on 20 July 2018, which was his Serbian SuperLiga debut. Terzić also started the 5th fixture match of the season, when he assisted to Slavoljub Srnić in 2–1 home victory over Čukarički.

=== Serie A ===
On 13 June 2019, Terzić joined Serie A club Fiorentina.

On 1 September 2020, Terzić joined Empoli on loan until 30 June 2021.

=== Red Bull Salzburg ===
On 23 July 2023, due to lack of playing time at Fiorentina, Terzić was sold to FC Red Bull Salzburg for 5.5 million.

== International career ==
=== Youth ===
Terzić debuted for Serbia U16 on 3 March 2015, replacing Nikola Savić in 1−1 draw to Slovenia. The same year in October, Terzić also made his debut for Serbia U17 in the first round qualification match for the Under-17 UEFA Euro, against Luxembourg. Playing with the team until 2016, Terzić had been named in squad for the final competition. In September 2016, Terzić was a part of the Serbia under-19 team on the memorial tournament "Stevan Vilotić - Ćele", where he debuted in the opening match against United States. On 29 November 2016, while he played with U19 squad respectively, Terzić scored on his debut for Serbia U18 against Montenegro.

In March next year, coach Milan Obradović called Terzić into the squad for elite qualification round of the 2017 UEFA European Under-19 Championship. Terzić also contributed to the team during the 2017−18 qualifications, scoring a goal in 4−1 victory over Azerbaijan on 7 October 2017.

As coach of the Serbia under-21, Goran Đorović included Terzić to the squad for competitive matches against Macedonia and Russia in September 2018.

=== Senior debut ===
On 7 June 2021, Terzić debuted for the Serbian senior squad in a friendly match against Jamaica.

== Career statistics ==
=== Club ===
As of match played 25 October 2026

Appearances and goals by club, season and competition
Club	Season	League			National cup (Note: Includes Coppa Italia, Austrian Cup)		Europe		Total	
Club	Season	Division	Apps	Goals	Apps	Goals	Apps	Goals	Apps	Goals
Red Star Belgrade	2017–18	Serbian SuperLiga	0	0	0	0	0	0	0	0
Red Star Belgrade	2018–19	Serbian SuperLiga	2	0	0	0	0	0	2	0
Red Star Belgrade	Total		2	0	0	0	0	0	2	0
Grafičar Beograd (loan)	2017–18	Serbian League Belgrade	10	0	—		—		10	0
Fiorentina	2019–20	Serie A	2	0	2	0	—		4	0
Fiorentina	2021–22	Serie A	14	0	1	0	—		15	0
Fiorentina	2022–23	Serie A	22	1	3	0	7 (Note: Appearances in UEFA Europa Conference League)	0	32	1
Fiorentina	Total		38	1	5	0	7	0	51	1
Empoli (loan)	2020–21	Serie B	21	0	2	0	—		23	0
Red Bull Salzburg	2023–24	Austrian Bundesliga	18	0	2	1	2 (Note: Appearances in UEFA Champions League)	0	22	1
Red Bull Salzburg	2024–25	Austrian Bundesliga	22	0	3	1	9	0	34	1
Red Bull Salzburg	2025–26	Austrian Bundesliga	21	0	4	0	6 (Note: One appearance in UEFA Champions League, five appearances and one goal in UEFA Europa League)	1	31	1
Red Bull Salzburg	Total		61	0	9	2	17	1	87	3
Frosinone	2026–27	Serie A	4	1	1	1	—		5	2
Career total			136	2	17	3	24	1	178	6

=== International ===
As of match played 4 October 2026

Appearances and goals by national team and year
National team	Year	Apps	Goals
Serbia	2021	3	0
Serbia	2022	2	0
Serbia	2023	1	0
Serbia	2024	2	1
Serbia	2025	5	0
Serbia	2026	5	0
Total		18	1

Scores and results list Serbia's goal tally first, score column indicates score after each Terzić goal.

List of international goals scored by Aleksa Terzić
No.	Date	Venue	Opponent	Score	Result	Competition
1	15 November 2024	Letzigrund, Zurich, Switzerland	Switzerland	1–1	1–1	2024–25 UEFA Nations League A

== Honours ==
Red Star Belgrade

- Serbian SuperLiga: 2018–19

Empoli

- Serie B: 2020–21

Fiorentina

- Coppa Italia runner-up: 2022–23
- UEFA Europa Conference League runner-up: 2022–23
