= Vujadin Savić =

Serbian footballer

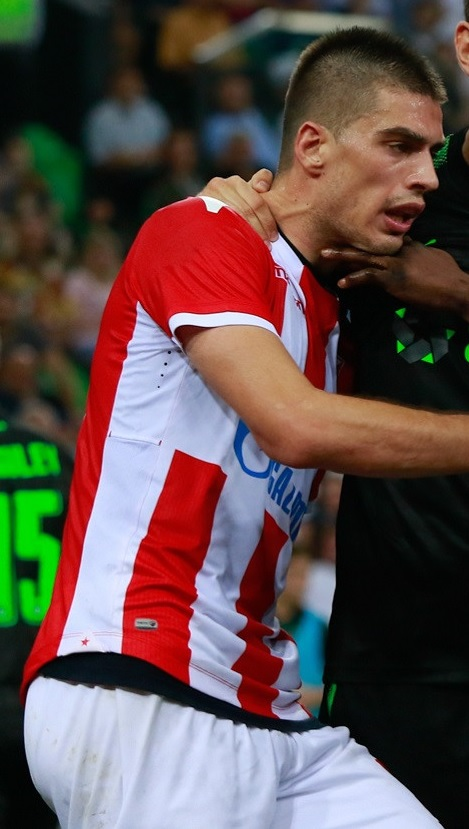
- Vujadin Savić with Red Star Belgrade (2017)

Personal information
- Date of birth: 1 July 1990 (age 36)
- Place of birth: Belgrade, SFR Yugoslavia
- Height: 1.94 m (6 ft 4 in)
- Position: Centre-back

Youth career
- 1998–2007: Red Star Belgrade

Senior career*
Years	Team	Apps	(Gls)
2007–2010	Red Star Belgrade	14	(0)
2007–2009	→ Rad (loan)	25	(0)
2010–2014	Bordeaux	10	(1)
2011–2014	→ Bordeaux II	14	(1)
2012–2013	→ Dynamo Dresden (loan)	34	(0)
2014	→ Arminia Bielefeld (loan)	6	(0)
2015	Watford	0	(0)
2015–2017	Sheriff Tiraspol	34	(4)
2017–2019	Red Star Belgrade	36	(1)
2019–2022	APOEL	34	(2)
2021	→ Olimpija Ljubljana (loan)	10	(2)
Total		217	(11)

International career
2008–2012	Serbia U19	2	(1)
2009–2012	Serbia U21	9	(1)

Managerial career
- 2022–2025: Red Star Belgrade (assistant)
- * Club domestic league appearances and goals

Vujadin Savić (Serbian Cyrillic: Вујадин Савић; born 1 July 1990) is a former Serbian football coach and former player. He played as a centre-back.

== Club career ==
=== Early career ===
Savić was eight years old when he began training for the Red Star Belgrade, where he passed all age categories. Between 2007 and 2009 he played for Rad before returning to Red Star where he would play in the first squad until 2010 when he moved to France and signed with Bordeaux. In January 2012, he went on loan to Dynamo Dresden for the rest of the 2011–12 season.

=== Watford ===
On 23 January 2015 Savić signed for English Championship club Watford until the end of the season. However, he was one of three released by Watford following their promotion to the Premier League in 2015, and left without making an appearance for the club.

=== Sheriff Tiraspol ===
In 2015, Savić joined Sheriff Tiraspol, where he made a total of 40 appearances and 4 goals in all competitions over two seasons. He scored a bicycle kick in a league match against Zaria Bălți on 19 September 2015.

=== Return to Red Star Belgrade ===
In June 2017, Savić returned to his home club, Red Star Belgrade, on a two-year contract. In his first season back in Belgrade, Red Star became the first team in history to make it to the 2018 Europa League knockout phase from the first qualifying round. It was also Red Star's first season surviving the group stage of a UEFA competition in 26 years. During the 2017 season, coach Vladan Milojević played Savić in reputable defensive partnerships with Srđan Babić and Damien Le Tallec. With Savić, Red Star conceded only two goals in the 2017 Europa League group stage; it was the second best defense in the Europa League group stage behind eventual semi-finalists Red Bull Salzburg. In May 2018, Savić was elected in the best 11 players for the 2017–18 Serbian SuperLiga season, by clubs captains' and managers' choice. The following season, Savić managed to guide Red Star to their first ever UEFA Champions League appearance. During the qualifying rounds, playing mostly in tandem with Miloš Degenek, Red Star managed to concede only three goals. In absence of club captain Nenad Milijaš, Savić captained Red Star in all four of the games he featured in. In two out of those four games, both home against Napoli and Liverpool, Red Star managed to keep a clean sheet. He played the first half against Liverpool at Anfield but was substituted at half-time due to injury. He missed the remaining two games against Napoli in Naples and Paris Saint-Germain in Belgrade also because of injury. On 25 January 2019, Savić extended his contract with Red Star until summer 2022.

=== APOEL ===
On 14 July 2019, Cypriot club APOEL officially announced Savić's signing. Savić joined APOEL from Red Star on a free transfer, with a provision that Red Star be paid half of the sum of his next transfer. He signed a three-year contract. In late August 2019, he underwent surgery for a groin injury.

On 15 February 2021, Savić was loaned to Slovenian PrvaLiga side Olimpija Ljubljana for the remainder of the 2020–21 Slovenian PrvaLiga season.

== International career ==
In March 2018, Savić got a first call to the Serbia national football team under coach Mladen Krstajić, for friendly games against Morocco and Nigeria. He failed to make a debut due to injury.

== Personal life ==
Vujadin is a son of Serbian former professional footballer Dušan Savić. He has four children with actress Mirka Vasiljević, his common law spouse. Savić was named after Serbian coach and former player Vujadin Boškov. He is also nicknamed Giška after his relative Đorđe Božović.

== Career statistics ==
=== Club ===
Appearances and goals by club, season and competition
Club	Season	League			Cup		Continental		Other		Total	
Club	Season	Division	Apps	Goals	Apps	Goals	Apps	Goals	Apps	Goals	Apps	Goals
Rad (loan)	2007–08	First League	7	0	0	0	—		—		7	0
Rad (loan)	2008–09	SuperLiga	18	0	0	0	—		—		18	0
Rad (loan)	Total		25	0	0	0	—		—		25	0
Red Star Belgrade	2009–10	SuperLiga	14	0	0	0	3	0	—		17	0
Bordeaux	2010–11	Ligue 1	7	1	1 (Note: Including an appearance in the Coupe de la Ligue)	0	—		—		8	1
Bordeaux	2011–12	Ligue 1	1	0	0	0	0	0	—		1	0
Bordeaux	2013–14	Ligue 1	2	0	1 (Note: Including an appearance in the Coupe de France)	0	1 (Note: Appearances in UEFA Europa League)	0	—		4	0
Bordeaux	Total		10	1	2	0	1	0	—		13	1
Bordeaux II	2011–12	CFA 2	9	1	—		—		—		9	1
Bordeaux II	2013–14	CFA 2	5	0	—		—		—		5	0
Bordeaux II	Total		14	1	—		—		—		14	1
Dynamo Dresden (loan)	2011–12	2. Bundesliga	13	0	—		—		—		13	0
Dynamo Dresden (loan)	2012–13	2. Bundesliga	21	0	2	0	—		—		23	0
Dynamo Dresden (loan)	Total		34	0	2	0	—		—		36	0
Arminia Bielefeld (loan)	2013–14	2. Bundesliga	6	0	—		—		—		6	0
Watford	2014–15	Championship	0	0	0	0	—		—		0	0
Sheriff	2015–16	National Division	18	1	1	0	0	0	—		19	1
Sheriff	2016–17	National Division	16	3	3	1	2	0	0	0	21	4
Sheriff	Total		34	4	4	1	2	0	0	0	40	5
Red Star Belgrade	2017–18	SuperLiga	17	0	2	0	15	0	—		34	0
Red Star Belgrade	2018–19	SuperLiga	19	1	1	0	11 (Note: Appearances in UEFA Champions League)	0	—		31	1
Red Star Belgrade	Total		36	1	3	0	26	0	—		65	1
APOEL	2019–20	First Division	17	1	1	1	8 (Note: Two appearances in UEFA Champions League, six appearances and one goal in UEFA Europa League)	1	1 (Note: Appearance in Cypriot Super Cup)	0	27	3
APOEL	2021–22	First Division	17	1	3	0	0	0	—		20	1
APOEL	Total		34	2	4	1	8	1	1	0	47	4
Olimpija (loan)	2020–21	Slovenian PrvaLiga	10	2	0	0	0	0	—		10	2
Career total			217	11	15	2	40	1	1	0	273	14

== Honours ==
Red Star Belgrade

- Serbian SuperLiga: 2017–18, 2018–19
- Serbian Cup: 2009–10

Sheriff

- National Division: 2015–16, 2016–17
- Moldovan Cup: 2016–17
- Moldovan Super Cup: 2016

APOEL

- Cyprus Super Cup: 2019

Olimpija Ljubljana

- Slovenian Cup: 2020–21

Individual

- Serbian SuperLiga Team of the Season: 2017–18
