= Stefan Hajdin =

Serbian association footballer

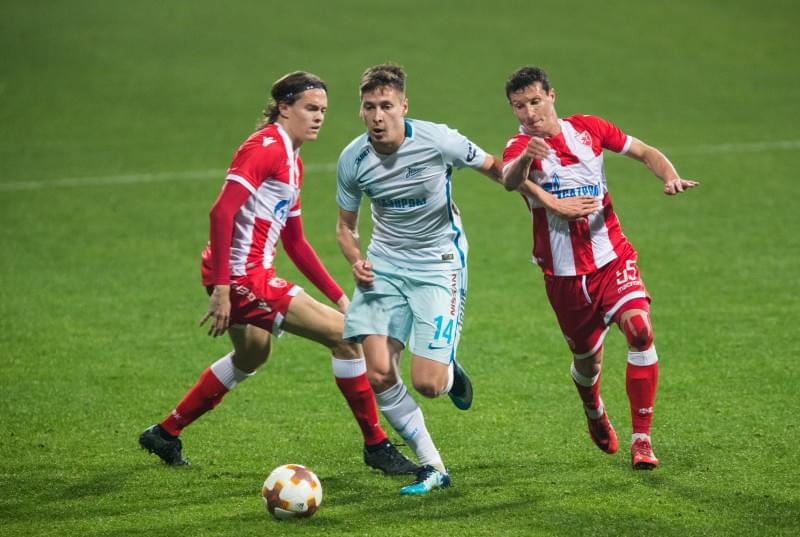
- Hajdin with Red Star Belgrade in 2018

Personal information
- Date of birth: 15 April 1994 (age 32)
- Place of birth: Glina, Croatia
- Height: 1.89 m (6 ft 2 in)
- Position: Left-back

Team information
- Current team: Budućnost
- Number: 3

Youth career
- Jedinstvo Vršac
- 2003–2008: Red Star Belgrade
- 2008–2012: Zemun

Senior career*
Years	Team	Apps	(Gls)
2011–2012	Zemun	4	(0)
2013	BASK	5	(0)
2014	Dunav Stari Banovci	8	(1)
2014–2017	Radnički Nova Pazova	72	(6)
2017	Spartak Subotica	22	(2)
2018–2021	Red Star Belgrade	7	(0)
2019–2020	→ Voždovac (loan)	26	(2)
2021–2022	Voždovac	71	(6)
2023–2024	Železničar Pančevo	48	(7)
2024–2025	Sepsi OSK	11	(0)
2025	Čukarički	7	(0)
2025	Napredak	18	(1)
2026–	Budućnost	8	(0)

International career
2012	Serbia U19	1	(0)
- * Club domestic league appearances and goals as of 15 June 2026

Stefan Hajdin (Serbian Cyrillic: Стефан Хајдин; born 15 April 1994) is a Serbian professional footballer who plays as a left back for Montenegrin First League club Budućnost.

== Club career ==
=== Early years ===
Hajdin made his first football steps in Vršac, playing with local club Jedinstvo. Later was member of Red Star Belgrade academy from 2003 to 2008, and finally completed his youth career with Zemun, where he also made his first senior appearances in the Serbian League Belgrade. Next he moved to BASK and later to Dunav Stari Banovci. Finally, Hajdin joined Radnički Nova Pazova in summer 2014, where he affirmed in next three season, scoring 6 goals on 72 matches in the Serbian League Vojvodina. In summer 2016, Hajdin was also called into the amateur squad under Football Association of Vojvodina for the UEFA Regions' Cup.

=== Spartak Subotica ===
In summer 2017, Hajdin's agent Raša Bebić connected him with Spartak Subotica. Hajdin passed a trial period, spending the complete pre-season with club. After he convinced the management in friendly matches, Hajdin signed a four-year professional contract in July 2017. He made his official debut for the club in the first fixture match of the 2017–18 Serbian SuperLiga campaign against OFK Bačka. He scored his first goal for the club in 1–1 draw to his former club, Zemun, on 24 September 2017. He also scored in the last SuperLiga match in 2017, for 1–1 draw to Vojvodina on 13 December. During the first half-season with the club, Hajdin collected 23 matches in both domestic competitions usually as the first choice under coach Aleksandar Veselinović, missing the first round cup match against Polet Lipljan only.

=== Red Star Belgrade ===
On 12 January 2018, Hajdin agreed on a three-year deal with Red Star Belgrade. The transfer fee was reported as €200k plus 20 percent of the future transfer. He officially promoted in new club by sporting director Mitar Mrkela next day. Hajdin chose to wear number 34 jersey. Hajdin made his official debut for the club in the Serbian Cup match against Mačva Šabac on 14 March 2018. Hajdin also made his league debut for the club on 13 May 2018, replacing Milan Rodić in 52 minute of the away match against Vojvodina. After passing the complete pre-season with first team in summer 2018, Hajdin was excluded from the UEFA Champions League player list for the 2018–19 qualifying phase.

== Playing style ==
Standing at 6-foot-2-and-a-half-inches (1.89 m), Hajdin uses both legs equally well. He usually operates as an offensive full-back or wing-back on the left flank, being capable of playing as a midfielder and participating in final actions. Although he mostly plays on the left side of the field, he often enters to the middle and take a shot with an inverted leg. Hajdin is also a long distance taker. While with Red Star Belgrade, Vladan Milojević used him as a right full-back respectively.

== Career statistics ==
As of 17 June 2026

Appearances and goals by club, season and competition
Club	Season	League			Cup		Continental		Other		Total	
Club	Season	Division	Apps	Goals	Apps	Goals	Apps	Goals	Apps	Goals	Apps	Goals
Zemun	2011–12	Serbian League Belgrade	4	0	—		—		—		4	0
BASK	2012–13	Serbian League Belgrade	5	0	—		—		—		5	0
Dunav Stari Banovci	2013–14	Serbian League Vojvodina	8	1	—		—		—		8	1
Radnički Nova Pazova	2014–15	Serbian League Vojvodina	28	2	—		—		—		28	2
Radnički Nova Pazova	2015–16	Serbian League Vojvodina	21	3	—		—		—		21	3
Radnički Nova Pazova	2016–17	Serbian League Vojvodina	23	1	—		—		—		23	1
Radnički Nova Pazova	Total		72	6	—		—		—		72	6
Spartak Subotica	2017–18	Serbian SuperLiga	22	2	1	0	—		—		23	2
Red Star Belgrade	2017–18	Serbian SuperLiga	1	0	1	0	0	0	—		2	0
Red Star Belgrade	2018–19	Serbian SuperLiga	6	0	2	0	0	0	—		8	0
Red Star Belgrade	Total		7	0	3	0	0	0	—		10	0
Voždovac (loan)	2019–20	Serbian SuperLiga	26	2	1	0	—		—		27	2
Voždovac	2020–21	Serbian SuperLiga	17	1	—		—		—		17	1
Voždovac	2021–22	Serbian SuperLiga	35	3	1	0	—		—		36	3
Voždovac	2022–23	Serbian SuperLiga	19	2	1	0	—		—		20	2
Voždovac	Total		97	8	3	0	—		—		100	8
Železničar Pančevo	2022–23	Serbian SuperLiga	16	1	—		—		—		16	1
Železničar Pančevo	2023–24	Serbian SuperLiga	32	6	0	0	—		2	0	34	6
Železničar Pančevo	Total		48	7	0	0	—		2	0	50	7
Sepsi OSK	2024–25	Liga I	11	0	2	0	—		—		13	0
Čukarički	2024–25	Serbian SuperLiga	7	0	1	0	—		—		8	0
Napredak	2025–26	Serbian SuperLiga	18	1	0	0	—		—		18	1
Budućnost	2025–26	Montenegrin First League	8	0	0	0	—		—		8	0
Career total			309	25	10	0	0	0	2	0	321	25

== Honours ==
Red Star Belgrade

- Serbian SuperLiga: 2017–18, 2018–19
- Serbian Cup runner-up: 2018–19

== Personal life ==
Hajdin was born in Glina, Croatia but moved to Serbia at an early age. He had lived at Vršac and Zemun until he became an adult. Hajdin is a Sport and Physical Education faculty student at the University of Belgrade. Hajdin likes to read books in his spare time and as some of his favorite writers quotes Orhan Pamuk and Paulo Coelho.
