= Ibrahim Tanko (footballer, born 1999) =

Ghanaian footballer

Personal information
- Date of birth: 30 April 1999 (age 27)
- Place of birth: Accra, Ghana
- Height: 1.86 m (6 ft 1 in)
- Position: Forward

Team information
- Current team: Javor Ivanjica
- Number: 9

Senior career*
Years	Team	Apps	(Gls)
2016	WAFA	13	(1)
2017	Mighty Jets	17	(3)
2017–2019	Red Star Belgrade	0	(0)
2018–2019	→ Bežanija (loan)	20	(3)
2019–2020	Mladost Lučani	10	(0)
2020–2024	Javor Ivanjica	102	(13)
2024	Maccabi Netanya	9	(0)
2024–2025	Radnički Niš	18	(2)
2025-	Javor Ivanjica	24	(1)
- * Club domestic league appearances and goals as of 13 June 2026

Ibrahim Tanko (born 30 April 1999) is a Ghanaian professional footballer who plays as a forward for Javor Ivanjica.

== Career ==
Tanko was born in Ghanaian capital Accra. In January 2016, Ghana Premier League outfit WAFA signed Tanko. He made his professional debut on 20 February against Asante Kotoko, which was followed by his first goal versus Ebusua Dwarfs on 24 April. That was his sole goal in thirteen appearances during 2016. Then, Tanko had a spell with Mighty Jets of Nigeria. On 21 August 2017, Serbian SuperLiga side Red Star Belgrade completed the signing of Tanko. August 2018 saw Tanko leave on loan to Bežanija of the Serbian First League.

Following his release from Red Star at the end of the 2018/19 season, Tanko joined Mladost Lučani on a three-year deal. He departed after one campaign, having appeared twelve times. On 2 July 2020, Tanko moved across the Serbian SuperLiga to Javor Ivanjica. He made his debut on 31 July, as his new side lost 2–1 to his former employers Mladost Lučani.

== Career statistics ==
As of 17 December 2020.

Club statistics
Club	Season	League			Cup		Continental		Total	
Club	Season	Division	Apps	Goals	Apps	Goals	Apps	Goals	Apps	Goals
Red Star Belgrade	2017–18	SuperLiga	0	0	0	0	0	0	0	0
Red Star Belgrade	2018–19	SuperLiga	0	0	0	0	0	0	0	0
Red Star Belgrade	Total		0	0	0	0	0	0	0	0
Bežanija (loan)	2018–19	First League	20	3	1	1	—		21	4
Mladost Lučani	2019–20	SuperLiga	10	0	2	0	—		12	0
Javor Ivanjica	2020–21	SuperLiga	28	1	1	0	—		29	1
Career total			44	3	3	1	0	0	47	4

== Honours ==
Individual

- Serbian SuperLiga Player of the Week: 2023–24 (Round 16)
