= Strahinja Krstevski =

Macedonian footballer (born 1997)

Personal information
- Date of birth: 8 June 1997 (age 29)
- Place of birth: Novi Sad, FR Yugoslavia
- Height: 1.89 m (6 ft 2 1/2 in)
- Position: Forward

Team information
- Current team: Paternò

Youth career
- 2006–2016: Vojvodina
- 2016: → Buriram United (loan)

Senior career*
Years	Team	Apps	(Gls)
2016–2018	Proleter Novi Sad	32	(9)
2017	→ Borac Šajkaš (loan)	14	(9)
2018	Lokomotiv Sofia	10	(1)
2019–2020	Red Star Belgrade	0	(0)
2019	→ Grafičar (loan)	10	(3)
2019	→ Rabotnichki (loan)	8	(0)
2020	→ Samtredia (loan)	0	(0)
2021	Levadia	10	(3)
2021–2022	FBC Gravina	24	(3)
2022–2023	Borac Šajkaš		
2023	Metaloglobus București	9	(0)
2024	Borac Šajkaš		
2024–2025	Veternik		
2025–	Paternò	0	(0)

International career
2011	Serbia U15		
2012	Serbia U16		
2013	Macedonia U17	4	(1)
2014	Macedonia U18	4	(3)
- * Club domestic league appearances and goals as of 21 February 2026

Strahinja Krstevski (Macedonian: Страхиња Крстевски; born 8 June 1997) is a Macedonian footballer who plays as a forward for Paternò.

== Club career ==
=== Early years ===
Born in Novi Sad, Krstevski passed Vojvodina youth school, where he spent 10 years between 2006 and 2016. Playing for youth categories of the club from his home town, Krstevski made more than 150 caps and scored over 100 goals. He also played some tournaments for youth players with Vojvodina and Buriram United, where he appeared as a loaned player for some period in 2016. As a captain of U19 squad, Strahinja made his debut for senior team at the friendly match against Hajduk Beška in spring 2016. In summer of the same year, he signed a three-year professional contract with club, which terminated shortly after and moved to Proleter Novi Sad.

=== Proleter Novi Sad ===
Krstevski signed one-year professional contract with Proleter Novi Sad at the beginning of August 2016. He made his senior debut in the first fixture of the 2016–17 Serbian First League season, in away match against Dinamo Vranje, played on 14 August 2016, when he also scored a goal. In the next fixture match, Krstevski scored 2 goals for win against Bežanija, and was nominated for player of the fixture. On 21 September 2016, Krstevski made an appearance in the first round of Serbian Cup, against Javor Ivanjica. He also scored a goal in a match against Jagodina until the end of first half-season. After he missed a period at the beginning of New year due to injury, Krstevski fully recovered in April 2017. He scored 2 goals in 4–1 home victory against Kolubara. In summer 2017, Krstevski moved on six-month loan to Vojvodina League South club Borac Šajkaš. Returning to the first squad of Proleter, manager Nenad Vanić usually used him as a back-up choice. Krstevski scored his first goal in the 2017–18 Serbian First League campaign in 3–0 victory over Dinamo Vranje on 11 April 2018. He also scored in 3–1 away victory over Radnički Kragujevac, after which Proleter made promotion to the Serbian SuperLiga. On 22 July 2018, Krstevski scored in opening fixture match of the 2018–19 Serbian SuperLiga campaign, against Radnički Niš.

== Honours ==
Proleter Novi Sad

- Serbian First League: 2017–18

Levadia

- Estonian Cup: 2020–21
