= Lorenzo Ebecilio =

Dutch professional footballer

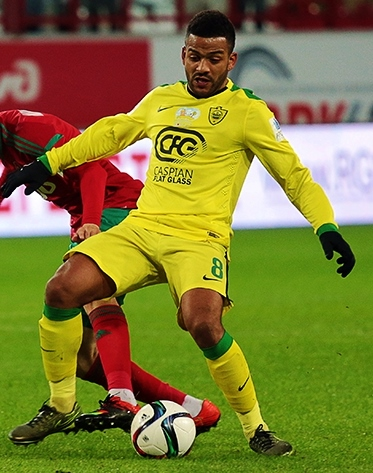
- Ebecilio playing for Anzhi Makhachkala in 2015

Personal information
- Full name: Lorenzo Leroy Ebecilio
- Date of birth: 24 September 1991 (age 35)
- Place of birth: Hoorn, Netherlands
- Height: 1.76 m (5 ft 9 in)
- Position: Midfielder

Youth career
- HVV Hollandia
- –2005: AZ
- 2007–2010: Ajax

Senior career*
Years	Team	Apps	(Gls)
2010–2012	Jong Ajax	41	(12)
2010–2013	Ajax	38	(9)
2013–2015	Metalurh Donetsk	6	(0)
2013–2014	→ Gabala (loan)	32	(8)
2014–2015	→ Mordovia Saransk (loan)	10	(2)
2015–2017	Anzhi Makhachkala	38	(3)
2017–2018	APOEL	37	(10)
2018–2019	Red Star Belgrade	19	(2)
2019–2020	Jubilo Iwata	3	(0)
2022	Achyronas Liopetriou	8	(2)
2022–2023	Makedonikos	0	(0)
2023	DHSC		
2023-2024	Always Forward Hoorn		

International career
2007–2008	Netherlands U17	8	(0)
2009–2010	Netherlands U19	8	(1)
2011	Netherlands U21	1	(0)
- * Club domestic league appearances and goals

Lorenzo Ebecilio (born 24 September 1991) is a Dutch retired footballer who played as a midfielder.

An Ajax academy product, he debuted for Ajax in the 2010–11 Eredivisie. During the first two seasons, despite his young age, he established himself as a regular starter and contributed significantly for two championships. However, his playing time dropped significantly in his third season, so in January 2013 Ebecilio leaves Ajax. He starts his journey abroad in Eastern Europe, first in Ukraine with Metalurh Donetsk, next with Azerbeijani club Gabala, before establishing himself in Russia where he spent almost three years playing with Mordovia Saransk and Anzhi Makhachkala. During the winter-break of the 2016–17 season Ebecilio left Russia and joined Cypriot side APOEL. Ebecilio spent two seasons with the Cypriot side, where he was a key player, scoring 11 times in 58 appearances.

In June 2018, Ebecilio signed a two-year contract with Serbian club Red Star Belgrade. From July 2019 until February 2020, he played for J1 League club Jubilo Iwata.

Internationally, Ebecilio represented the Netherlands at U17, U19 and U21 levels.

== Club career ==
=== Early years ===
Ebecilio started his career with VV de Blokkers, an amateur club from Hoorn. He would later play in the youth teams of HVV Hollandia and AZ.

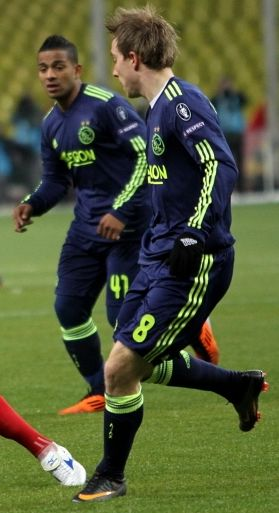
Ebecilio (left) with Ajax teammate Christian Eriksen in 2011.

On 27 October 2005, several months following the death of his father, the fourteen-year-old Ebecilio had a heart attack and had to have a defibrillator surgically implanted. He was forced to leave AZ due to these health concerns, and the player returned to HVV Hollandia. He no longer has any problems related to his heart following the surgery. Ajax subsequently offered him a place in their youth academy.

=== Ajax ===
At Ajax, Ebecilio played for Jong Ajax under manager Frank de Boer. On 12 December 2010, six days after the departure of Martin Jol and the installation of De Boer as caretaker manager, Ebecilio made his debut in the first team of Ajax, being in the starting line-up in an away victory over Vitesse Arnhem. The player also appeared in the starting line-up in the last game of 2010, in a 1–0 victory over former club AZ, playing the full 90 minutes. He was named man-of-the-match in the game against his former club.

2011 began much like 2010 had ended, with the player being in the starting line-up for the league matches against Feyenoord, FC Utrecht, NAC Breda, and De Graafschap. On 17 February 2011, Ebecilio made his European debut in the 3–0 Europa League away victory over Anderlecht. Ebecilio participated in most of Ajax matches during the second half of the season, ultimately leading to the Dutch league championship. Ebecilio also appeared in the KNVB Cup final against FC Twente. Ajax lost the final with 3–2, despite one goal of Ebecilio. On 4 March 2012, Ebecilio scored his first hat-trick for Ajax in a 4–1 win over Roda JC.

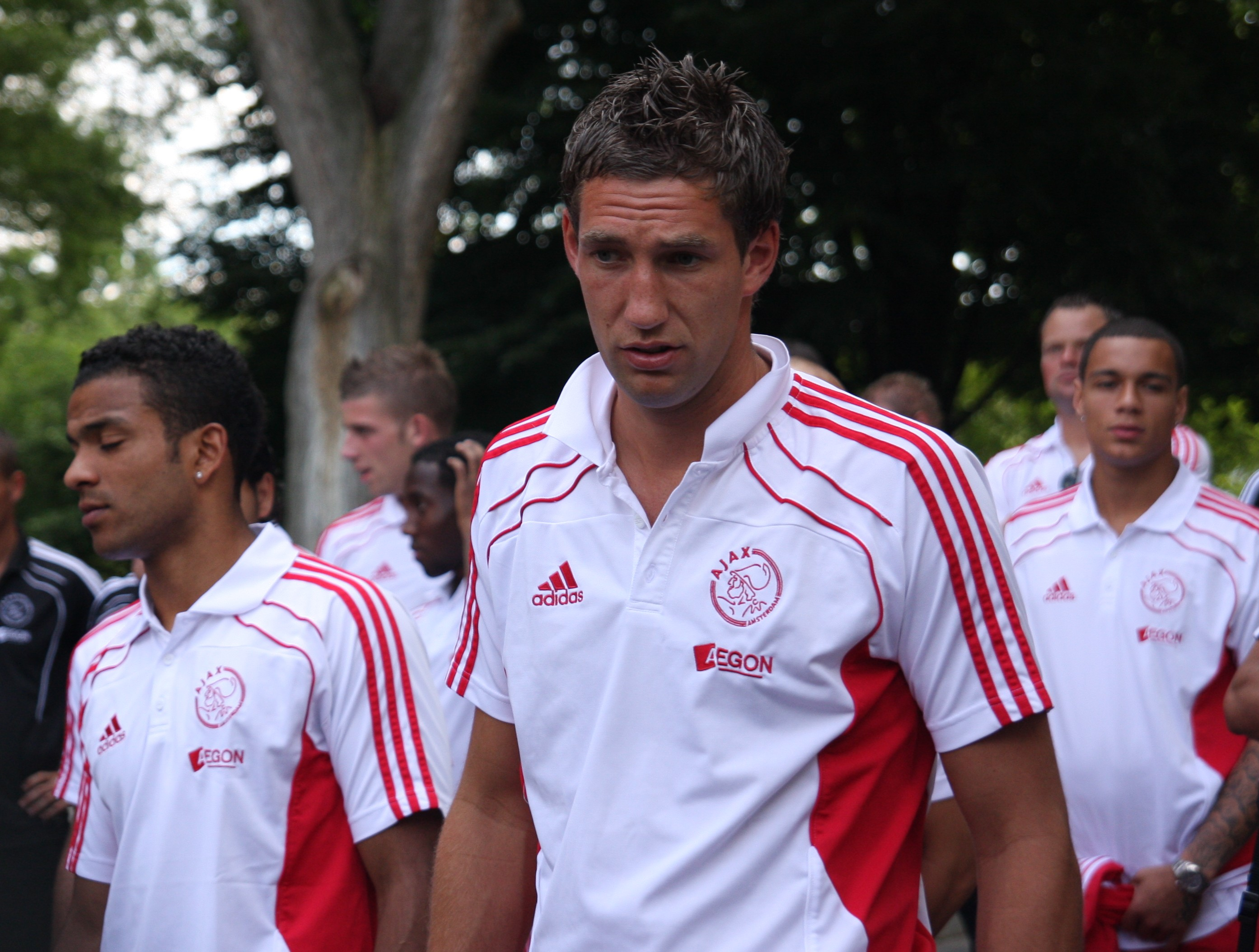
Ebecilio (left) with Maarten Stekelenburg and Gregory van der Wiel (behind: Toby Alderweireld, Vurnon Anita, and Jeroen Verhoeven) in 2011.

=== Metalurh Donetsk ===
The 2012–13 season saw Ebecilio receiving much less playing time. On 2 January 2013, Marc Overmars announced the transfer of Ebecilio to Ukrainian club Metalurh Donetsk on a three-year contract, for a sum of €500,000.

=== Loan to Gabala ===
On 5 June 2013, it was announced that Ebecilio had signed a one-year loan deal with Azerbaijan Premier League team Gabala. Ebecilio made his debut for Gabala on 2 August 2013, Gabala's first games of the 2013–14 season against Baku. His first goal for Gabala came in his fifth game, a 3–2 home victory over Inter Baku on 31 August 2013.

=== Loan to Mordovia Saransk ===
Following the end of his Gabala contract, Ebecilio followed Ibrahima Niasse and Yuri Semin to Mordovia Saransk, by joining the club on trial. On 24 July 2014, Ebecilio joined Mordovia Saransk on a season-long loan deal. During his league debut for Mordovia, on 2 August, Ebecilio fractured his tibia in a challenge with Chisamba Lungu, and was ruled out for around six months.

=== Anzhi Makhachkala ===
On 7 July 2015, Ebecilio signed for Anzhi Makhachkala on a three-year contract, linking up with Yuri Semin for a third season.

=== APOEL ===
On 26 January 2017, Ebecilio signed a two-and-a-half-year contract with Cypriot First Division champions APOEL FC. He made his official debut on 20 February 2017, coming on as an 85th-minute substitute in APOEL's 3–0 home victory against AEL Limassol in the 2016–17 Cypriot First Division. He scored his first competitive goal for APOEL on 9 April 2017 in his team's 1–0 league win against arch rivals Omonia.

=== Red Star Belgrade ===
On 29 June 2018, Ebecilio signed a two-year deal with Red Star Belgrade with an option for a one-year extension. One of the main reasons the club signed him was because a replacement was needed for Guélor Kanga, who had left the club six-months ago. Ebecilio made his debut in the first leg match of the UEFA Champions League First qualifying round against Spartaks Jūrmala, replacing Nemanja Milić at the half-time. Ebecilio made his Serbian SuperLiga debut in 3–0 victory over Dinamo Vranje on 20 July 2018, when he also assisted Dejan Joveljić for his second goal of the match. Ebecilio scored his first goal for Red Star against Lithuanian club Sūduva on 24 July 2018, in the first leg match of the Champions League second qualifying round.

=== Júbilo Iwata ===
On 27 July 2019, Ebecilio signed for J1 League club Júbilo Iwata. In February 2020, he terminated his contract with Júbilo Iwata.

=== Achyronas Liopetriou ===
After being without a club for nearly two years, in July 2022 Ebecilio signed for Achyronas Liopetriou in the Cypriot Second Division. He left the club in October 2022.

=== Makedonikos Neapolis ===
In October 2022 Ebecilio signed for Super League Greece 2 club Makedonikos Neapolis.

=== DHSC ===
In January 2023 Ebecilio signed for the Dutch Fourth Division side DHSC.

== International career ==
Born in the Netherlands, Ebecilio is of Surinamese descent. Ebecilio has represented Netherlands U-17 and Netherlands U-19. He represented the Netherlands in the 2008 UEFA European Under-17 Football Championship and the 2010 UEFA European Under-19 Football Championship. On 9 February 2011, Ebecilio made his debut for Netherlands U-21 in a match against the Czech Republic.

== Personal life ==
He is not closely related to Kyle Ebecilio. Ebecilio's uncle is Dutch retired footballer Roland Alberg, who was with him during Lorenzo's heart attack at the dentist in 2005.

Ebecilio was alleged to have fathered two children, who were born on the exact same day, with two different women while playing football in Russia. A Russian judge wanted him to do a DNA test after one of the mothers claimed her daughter to be Ebecilio's.

== Career statistics ==
=== Club ===
As of match played 7 December 2019.

Appearances and goals by club, season and competition
Club	Season	League			National Cup		Continental		Other		Total	
Club	Season	Division	Apps	Goals	Apps	Goals	Apps	Goals	Apps	Goals	Apps	Goals
Ajax	2010–11	Eredivisie	16	3	4	2	4 (Note: Appearances in UEFA Europa League)	0	—		24	5
Ajax	2011–12	Eredivisie	22	6	0	0	5 (Note: Appearances in UEFA Champions League)	0	1 (Note: Appearances in Johan Cruyff Shield)	0	28	6
Ajax	2012–13	Eredivisie	0	0	0	0	0	0	0	0	0	0
Ajax	Total		38	9	4	2	9	0	1	0	52	11
Metalurh Donetsk	2012–13	Ukrainian Premier League	6	0	0	0	—		—		6	0
Gabala (loan)	2013–14	Azerbaijan Premier League	32	8	5	0	—		—		37	8
Mordovia Saransk (loan)	2014–15	Russian Premier League	10	2	0	0	—		—		10	2
Anzhi Makhachkala	2015–16	Russian Premier League	25	2	2	0	—		2 (Note: Appearances in Russian Premier League relegation play-offs)	0	29	2
Anzhi Makhachkala	2016–17	Russian Premier League	13	1	1	0	—		—		14	1
Anzhi Makhachkala	Total		38	3	3	0	—		2	0	43	3
APOEL	2016–17	Cypriot First Division	8	2	2	0	3	0	—		13	2
APOEL	2017–18	Cypriot First Division	29	8	5	1	10	0	1 (Note: Appearance in Cypriot Super Cup)	0	45	9
APOEL	Total		37	10	7	1	13	0	1	0	58	11
Red Star Belgrade	2018–19	Serbian SuperLiga	19	2	2	0	9	1	—		30	3
Júbilo Iwata	2019	J1 League	3	0	0	0	—		—		3	0
Career total			173	34	21	3	31	1	4	0	229	37

== Honours ==
Ajax

- Eredivisie: 2010–11, 2011–12

APOEL

- Cypriot First Division: 2016–17, 2017–18

Red Star Belgrade

- Serbian SuperLiga: 2018–19
