= 2018–19 UEFA Champions League qualifying =

European football tournament

2018–19 UEFA Champions League qualifying was the preliminary phase of the 2018–19 UEFA Champions League, prior to the competition proper. Qualification consisted of the qualifying phase (preliminary and first to third rounds) and the play-off round. It began on 26 June and ended on 29 August 2018.

A total of 53 teams competed in the qualifying system of the 2018–19 UEFA Champions League, with 43 teams in Champions Path and 10 teams in League Path. The six winners in the play-off round (four from Champions Path, two from League Path) advanced to the group stage, to join the 26 teams that entered the group stage.

Times are CEST (UTC+2), as listed by UEFA (local times, if different, are in parentheses).

== Teams ==
=== Champions Path ===
The Champions Path includes all league champions which do not qualify directly for the group stage, and consists of the following rounds:

- Preliminary round (4 teams playing one-legged semi-finals and final): 4 teams which enter in this round.
- First qualifying round (32 teams): 31 teams which enter in this round, and 1 winner of the preliminary round.
- Second qualifying round (20 teams): 4 teams which enter in this round, and 16 winners of the first qualifying round.
- Third qualifying round (12 teams): 2 teams which enter in this round, and 10 winners of the second qualifying round.
- Play-off round (8 teams): 2 teams which enter in this round, and 6 winners of the third qualifying round.

All teams eliminated from the Champions Path enter the Europa League:

- The 3 losers of the preliminary round and 15 of the 16 losers of the first qualifying round (excluding 1 team which receives a bye to the third qualifying round as decided by an additional draw held after the Champions League first qualifying round draw) enter the Champions Path second qualifying round.
- The loser of the first qualifying round which receives a bye and the 10 losers of the second qualifying round enter the Champions Path third qualifying round.
- The 6 losers of the third qualifying round enter the Champions Path play-off round.
- The 4 losers of the play-off round enter the group stage.

Below are the participating teams of the Champions Path (with their 2018 UEFA club coefficients), grouped by their starting rounds.

Key to colours
Winners of play-off round advance to group stage
Losers of play-off round enter Europa League group stage
Losers of third qualifying round enter Europa League play-off round
Losers of second qualifying round (and 1 loser of first qualifying round) enter Europa League third qualifying round
Losers of the preliminary round and first qualifying round enter Europa League second qualifying round

Play-off round
Team	Coeff.
(Netherlands) PSV Eindhoven	36.000
(Switzerland) Young Boys	20.500

Third qualifying round
Team	Coeff.
(Austria) Red Bull Salzburg	55.500
(Greece) AEK Athens	10.000

Second qualifying round
Team	Coeff.
(Belarus) BATE Borisov	20.500
(Croatia) Dinamo Zagreb	17.500
(Denmark) Midtjylland	11.500
(Romania) CFR Cluj	4.090

First qualifying round
Team	Coeff.
(Bulgaria) Ludogorets Razgrad	37.000
(Scotland) Celtic	31.000
(Cyprus) APOEL	27.000
(Poland) Legia Warsaw	24.500
(Kazakhstan) Astana	21.750
(Azerbaijan) Qarabağ	20.500
(Moldova) Sheriff Tiraspol	14.750
(Sweden) Malmö FF	14.000
(Serbia) Red Star Belgrade	10.750
(Israel) Hapoel Be'er Sheva	10.000
(Norway) Rosenborg	9.000
(Finland) HJK	8.000
(Wales) The New Saints	5.000
(Hungary) Vidi	4.250
(Albania) Kukësi	4.250
(Bosnia and Herzegovina) Zrinjski Mostar	3.750
(North Macedonia) Shkëndija	3.500
(Luxembourg) F91 Dudelange	3.500
(Slovakia) Spartak Trnava	3.500
(Malta) Valletta	3.250
(Faroe Islands) Víkingur Gøta	3.000
(Northern Ireland) Crusaders	3.000
(Slovenia) Olimpija Ljubljana	2.900
(Armenia) Alashkert	2.500
(Montenegro) Sutjeska	2.500
(Lithuania) Sūduva	2.000
(Latvia) Spartaks Jūrmala	1.750
(Republic of Ireland) Cork City	1.750
(Iceland) Valur	1.650
(Estonia) Flora	1.250
(Georgia (country)) Torpedo Kutaisi	1.000

Preliminary round
Team	Coeff.
(Andorra) FC Santa Coloma	2.750
(Gibraltar) Lincoln Red Imps	2.750
(San Marino) La Fiorita	1.750
(Kosovo) Drita	0.000

=== League Path ===
The League Path includes all league non-champions which do not qualify directly for the group stage, and consists of the following rounds:

- Second qualifying round (4 teams): 4 teams which enter in this round.
- Third qualifying round (8 teams): 6 teams which enter in this round, and 2 winners of the second qualifying round.
- Play-off round (4 teams): 4 winners of the third qualifying round.

All teams eliminated from the League Path enter the Europa League:

- The 2 losers of the second qualifying round enter the Main Path third qualifying round.
- The 4 losers of the third qualifying round and the 2 losers of the play-off round enter the group stage.

Below are the participating teams of the League Path (with their 2018 UEFA club coefficients), grouped by their starting rounds.

Key to colours
Winners of play-off round advance to group stage
Losers of play-off round and third qualifying round enter Europa League group stage
Losers of second qualifying round enter Europa League third qualifying round

Third qualifying round
Team	Coeff.
(Portugal) Benfica	80.000
(Ukraine) Dynamo Kyiv	62.000
(Turkey) Fenerbahçe	23.500
(Russia) Spartak Moscow	13.500
(Belgium) Standard Liège	12.500
(Czech Republic) Slavia Prague	7.500

Second qualifying round
Team	Coeff.
(Switzerland) Basel	71.000
(Netherlands) Ajax	53.500
(Greece) PAOK	29.500
(Austria) Sturm Graz	6.570

== Format ==
Each tie, apart from the preliminary round, is played over two legs, with each team playing one leg at home. The team that scores more goals on aggregate over the two legs advance to the next round. If the aggregate score is level, the away goals rule is applied, i.e. the team that scores more goals away from home over the two legs advances. If away goals are also equal, then extra time is played. The away goals rule is again applied after extra time, i.e. if there are goals scored during extra time and the aggregate score is still level, the visiting team advances by virtue of more away goals scored. If no goals are scored during extra time, the tie is decided by penalty shoot-out. In the preliminary round, where single-match semi-finals and final are hosted by one of the participating teams, if scores are level at the end of normal time, extra time is played, followed by penalty shoot-out if scores remain tied.

In the draws for each round, teams are seeded based on their UEFA club coefficients at the beginning of the season, with the teams divided into seeded and unseeded pots containing the same number of teams. A seeded team is drawn against an unseeded team, with the order of legs (or the administrative "home" team in the preliminary round matches) in each tie decided by draw. As the identity of the winners of the previous round is not known at the time of the draws, the seeding is carried out under the assumption that the team with the higher coefficient of an undecided tie advances to this round, which means if the team with the lower coefficient is to advance, it simply take the seeding of its opponent. Prior to the draws, UEFA may form "groups" in accordance with the principles set by the Club Competitions Committee, but they are purely for convenience of the draw and do not resemble any real groupings in the sense of the competition. Teams from associations with political conflicts as decided by UEFA may not be drawn into the same tie. After the draws, the order of legs of a tie may be reversed by UEFA due to scheduling or venue conflicts.

== Schedule ==
The schedule is as follows (all draws are held at the UEFA headquarters in Nyon, Switzerland).

Qualifying phase and play-off round schedule
Round	Draw date	First leg	Second leg
Preliminary round	12 June 2018	26 June 2018 (semi-final round)	29 June 2018 (final round)
First qualifying round	19 June 2018	10–11 July 2018	17–18 July 2018
Second qualifying round	19 June 2018	24–25 July 2018	31 July – 1 August 2018
Third qualifying round	23 July 2018	7–8 August 2018	14 August 2018
Play-off round	6 August 2018	21–22 August 2018	28–29 August 2018

== Preliminary round ==
The draw for the preliminary round was held on 12 June 2018, 12:00 CEST, to determine the matchups of the semi-finals and the administrative "home" team of each semi-final and final.

=== Seeding ===
A total of four teams were involved in the preliminary round draw. Two teams were seeded and two teams were unseeded for the semi-final round draw.

Seeded	Unseeded
(Andorra) FC Santa Coloma; (Gibraltar) Lincoln Red Imps	(San Marino) La Fiorita; (Kosovo) Drita

=== Bracket ===
Semi-final round
26 June – Gibraltar
(San Marino) La Fiorita	0
(Gibraltar) Lincoln Red Imps	2
26 June – Gibraltar
(Andorra) FC Santa Coloma	0
(Kosovo) Drita (a.e.t.)	2

Final round
29 June – Gibraltar
(Gibraltar) Lincoln Red Imps	1
(Kosovo) Drita (a.e.t.)	4

=== Summary ===
The semi-final round was played on 26 June, and the final round on 29 June 2018, both at the Victoria Stadium in Gibraltar.

Team 1	Score	Team 2
Semi-final round
FC Santa Coloma (Andorra)	0–2 (a.e.t.)	(Kosovo) Drita
La Fiorita (San Marino)	0–2	(Gibraltar) Lincoln Red Imps
Final round
Lincoln Red Imps (Gibraltar)	1–4 (a.e.t.)	(Kosovo) Drita

=== Semi-final round ===
26 June 2018
17:00

FC Santa Coloma (Andorra)	0–2 (a.e.t.)	(Kosovo) Drita
	Report	Shabani 99'; Gërbeshi 105+3' (pen.)

Victoria Stadium, Gibraltar
Attendance: 288
Referee: Paul McLaughlin (Republic of Ireland)

26 June 2018
21:00

La Fiorita (San Marino)	0–2	(Gibraltar) Lincoln Red Imps
	Report	Hernandez 2'; Moreno 51'

Victoria Stadium, Gibraltar
Attendance: 840
Referee: Jørgen Burchardt (Denmark)

=== Final round ===
29 June 2018
20:30

Lincoln Red Imps (Gibraltar)	1–4 (a.e.t.)	(Kosovo) Drita
Corral 61'	Report	Leci 2', 105+3' (pen.); Shabani 120'; Neziraj 120+4'

Victoria Stadium, Gibraltar
Attendance: 468
Referee: Manfredas Lukjančukas (Lithuania)

== First qualifying round ==
The draw for the first qualifying round was held on 19 June 2018, 12:00 CEST.

=== Seeding ===
A total of 32 teams were involved in the first qualifying round draw: 31 teams entering in this round, and the winners of the preliminary round. They were divided into three groups: two of ten teams, where five teams were seeded and five teams were unseeded, and one of twelve teams, where six teams were seeded and six teams were unseeded.

Group 1		Group 2		Group 3	
Seeded	Unseeded	Seeded	Unseeded	Seeded	Unseeded
(Cyprus) APOEL; (Azerbaijan) Qarabağ; (Moldova) Sheriff Tiraspol; (Wales) The New Saints; (Hungary) Vidi	(North Macedonia) Shkëndija; (Luxembourg) F91 Dudelange; (Slovenia) Olimpija Ljubljana; (Lithuania) Sūduva; (Georgia (country)) Torpedo Kutaisi	(Bulgaria) Ludogorets Razgrad; (Poland) Legia Warsaw; (Sweden) Malmö FF; (Norway) Rosenborg; (Finland) HJK	(Faroe Islands) Víkingur Gøta; (Northern Ireland) Crusaders; (Kosovo) Drita; (Republic of Ireland) Cork City; (Iceland) Valur	(Scotland) Celtic; (Kazakhstan) Astana; (Serbia) Red Star Belgrade; (Israel) Hapoel Be'er Sheva; (Albania) Kukësi; (Bosnia and Herzegovina) Zrinjski Mostar	(Slovakia) Spartak Trnava; (Malta) Valletta; (Armenia) Alashkert; (Montenegro) Sutjeska; (Latvia) Spartaks Jūrmala; (Estonia) Flora

Notes

1. ^{†} Winners of the preliminary round. Teams in italics defeated a team with a higher coefficient, thus effectively taking the coefficient of their opponent in the draw.

=== Summary ===
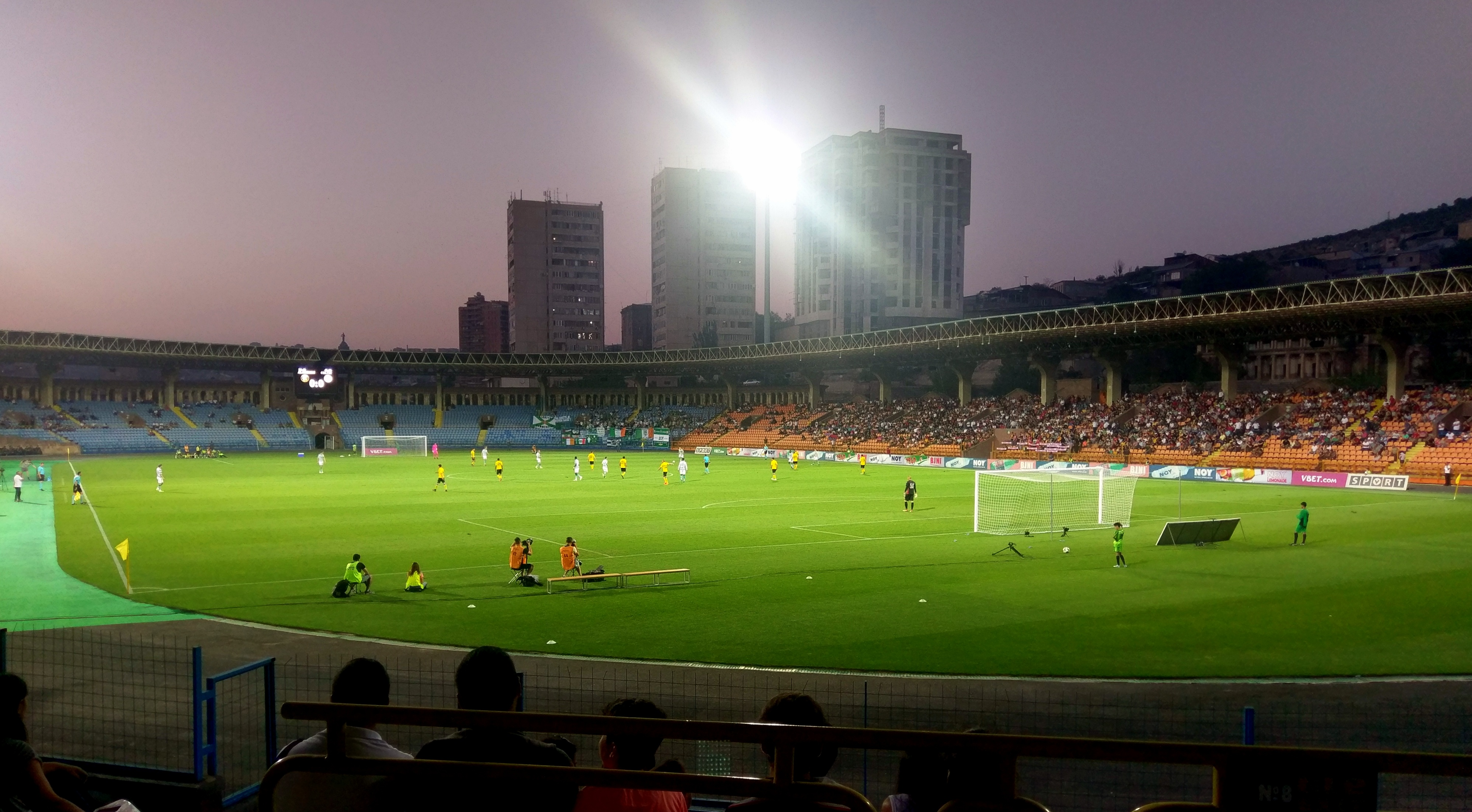
Alashkert vs Celtic, 1st leg match in Yerevan of the First qualifying round

The first legs were played on 10 and 11 July, and the second legs on 17 and 18 July 2018.

Team 1	Agg.	Team 2	1st leg	2nd leg
Torpedo Kutaisi (Georgia (country))	2–4	(Moldova) Sheriff Tiraspol	2–1	0–3
Shkëndija (North Macedonia)	5–4	(Wales) The New Saints	5–0	0–4
Sūduva (Lithuania)	3–2	(Cyprus) APOEL	3–1	0–1
Olimpija Ljubljana (Slovenia)	0–1	(Azerbaijan) Qarabağ	0–1	0–0
F91 Dudelange (Luxembourg)	2–3	(Hungary) Vidi	1–1	1–2
Drita (Kosovo)	0–5	(Sweden) Malmö FF	0–3	0–2
Víkingur Gøta (Faroe Islands)	2–5 (Note: Order of legs reversed after original draw.)	(Finland) HJK	1–2	1–3
Ludogorets Razgrad (Bulgaria)	9–0	(Northern Ireland) Crusaders	7–0	2–0
Cork City (Republic of Ireland)	0–4 (Note: Losers drawn to receive a bye to the Europa League third qualifying round.)	(Poland) Legia Warsaw	0–1	0–3
Valur (Iceland)	2–3	(Norway) Rosenborg	1–0	1–3
Kukësi (Albania)	1–1 (a)	(Malta) Valletta	0–0	1–1
Flora (Estonia)	2–7	(Israel) Hapoel Be'er Sheva	1–4	1–3
Spartaks Jūrmala (Latvia)	0–2	(Serbia) Red Star Belgrade	0–0	0–2
Alashkert (Armenia)	0–6	(Scotland) Celtic	0–3	0–3
Spartak Trnava (Slovakia)	2–1	(Bosnia and Herzegovina) Zrinjski Mostar	1–0	1–1
Astana (Kazakhstan)	3–0	(Montenegro) Sutjeska	1–0	2–0

=== Matches ===
10 July 2018
17:30 (19:30 UTC+4)

Torpedo Kutaisi (Georgia (country))	2–1	(Moldova) Sheriff Tiraspol
Kimadze 24'; Kukhianidze 64' (pen.)	Report	Badibanga 14'

Ramaz Shengelia Stadium, Kutaisi
Attendance: 7,251
Referee: Aleksandrs Golubevs (Latvia)
18 July 2018
19:00 (20:00 UTC+3)

Sheriff Tiraspol (Moldova)	3–0	(Georgia (country)) Torpedo Kutaisi
Badibanga 9'; Jô Santos 40', 55'	Report

Sheriff Stadium, Tiraspol
Attendance: 5,740
Referee: Peter Kjærsgaard-Andersen (Denmark)

Sheriff Tiraspol won 4–2 on aggregate.

10 July 2018
20:15

Shkëndija (North Macedonia)	5–0	(Wales) The New Saints
Emini 14'; Ibraimi 38', 53', 60', 66'	Report

Philip II Arena, Skopje (Note: Shkëndija played their home matches at Philip II Arena, Skopje, instead of their regular stadium Ecolog Arena, Tetovo, due to renovation.)
Attendance: 2,700
Referee: Timotheos Christofi (Cyprus)
17 July 2018
20:00 (19:00 UTC+1)

The New Saints (Wales)	4–0	(North Macedonia) Shkëndija
Ebbe 15'; Redmond 30'; Cabango 35'; Byrne 90+6'	Report

Park Hall, Oswestry
Attendance: 756
Referee: Pavel Orel (Czech Republic)

Shkëndija won 5–4 on aggregate.

11 July 2018
18:00 (19:00 UTC+3)

Sūduva (Lithuania)	3–1	(Cyprus) APOEL
Cicilia 9', 13', 19'	Report	Caju 90+4'

ARVI Arena, Marijampolė
Attendance: 3,378
Referee: Fedayi San (Switzerland)
17 July 2018
19:00 (20:00 UTC+3)

APOEL (Cyprus)	1–0	(Lithuania) Sūduva
Poté 20'	Report

GSP Stadium, Nicosia
Attendance: 12,149
Referee: Glenn Nyberg (Sweden)

Sūduva won 3–2 on aggregate.

11 July 2018
20:00

Olimpija Ljubljana (Slovenia)	0–1	(Azerbaijan) Qarabağ
	Report	Guerrier 79'

Stožice Stadium, Ljubljana
Attendance: 5,248
Referee: Lawrence Visser (Belgium)
18 July 2018
19:00 (21:00 UTC+4)

Qarabağ (Azerbaijan)	0–0	(Slovenia) Olimpija Ljubljana
	Report

Tofiq Bahramov Republican Stadium, Baku (Note: Qarabağ played their home matches at Tofiq Bahramov Republican Stadium, Baku, instead of their regular stadium Azersun Arena, Baku.)
Attendance: 21,520
Referee: Erez Papir (Israel)

Qarabağ won 1–0 on aggregate.

10 July 2018
18:00

F91 Dudelange (Luxembourg)	1–1	(Hungary) Vidi
Mélisse 58'	Report	Huszti 42'

Stade Jos Nosbaum, Dudelange
Attendance: 1,057
Referee: Zaven Hovhannisyan (Armenia)
17 July 2018
20:15

Vidi (Hungary)	2–1	(Luxembourg) F91 Dudelange
Lazović 18'; Šćepović 58'	Report	Clément 54'

Pancho Aréna, Felcsút (Note: Vidi played their qualifying rounds home matches at Pancho Aréna, Felcsút and play-off round home match at Groupama Arena, Budapest, instead of their regular stadium Sóstói Stadion, Székesfehérvár, due to reconstruction.)
Attendance: 2,514
Referee: Donald Robertson (Scotland)

Vidi won 3–2 on aggregate.

10 July 2018
20:45

Drita (Kosovo)	0–3	(Sweden) Malmö FF
	Report	Strandberg 13'; Traustason 39'; Rosenberg 82'

Adem Jashari Olympic Stadium, Mitrovica (Note: Drita played their home match at Adem Jashari Olympic Stadium, Mitrovica, instead of their regular stadium Gjilan City Stadium, Gjilan.)
Attendance: 9,780
Referee: Boris Marhefka (Slovakia)
17 July 2018
19:00

Malmö FF (Sweden)	2–0	(Kosovo) Drita
Strandberg 55'; Larsson 60'	Report

Stadion, Malmö
Attendance: 10,623
Referee: Laurent Kopriwa (Luxembourg)

Malmö FF won 5–0 on aggregate.

10 July 2018
20:00 (19:00 UTC+1)

Víkingur Gøta (Faroe Islands)	1–2	(Finland) HJK
G. Vatnhamar 51'	Report	Dahlström 9'; Gregersen 29' (o.g.)

Svangaskarð, Toftir (Note: Víkingur Gøta played their home match at Svangaskarð, Toftir, instead of their regular stadium Sarpugerði, Norðragøta.)
Attendance: 300
Referee: Robert Hennessy (Republic of Ireland)
17 July 2018
18:00 (19:00 UTC+3)

HJK (Finland)	3–1	(Faroe Islands) Víkingur Gøta
Klauss 1'; Mensah 10'; Yaghoubi 19'	Report	G. Vatnhamar 21'

Telia 5G -areena, Helsinki
Attendance: 5,125
Referee: Duje Strukan (Croatia)

HJK won 5–2 on aggregate.

11 July 2018
19:00 (20:00 UTC+3)

Ludogorets Razgrad (Bulgaria)	7–0	(Northern Ireland) Crusaders
Marcelinho 25', 66'; Brown 40' (o.g.); Keșerü 53'; Świerczok 73', 78', 80'	Report

Ludogorets Arena, Razgrad
Attendance: 4,597
Referee: Dumitru Muntean (Moldova)
17 July 2018
21:00 (20:00 UTC+1)

Crusaders (Northern Ireland)	0–2	(Bulgaria) Ludogorets Razgrad
	Report	Brown 11' (o.g.); Świerczok 65'

Seaview, Belfast
Attendance: 1,116
Referee: Roomer Tarajev (Estonia)

Ludogorets Razgrad won 9–0 on aggregate.

10 July 2018
20:45 (19:45 UTC+1)

Cork City (Republic of Ireland)	0–1	(Poland) Legia Warsaw
	Report	Kucharczyk 79'

Turners Cross, Cork
Attendance: 5,795
Referee: Radu Petrescu (Romania)
17 July 2018
21:00

Legia Warsaw (Poland)	3–0	(Republic of Ireland) Cork City
Kanté 28'; Radović 73' (pen.); Carlitos 89'	Report

Polish Army Stadium, Warsaw
Attendance: 14,576
Referee: Kai Erik Steen (Norway)

Legia Warsaw won 4–0 on aggregate.

11 July 2018
22:00 (20:00 UTC+0)

Valur (Iceland)	1–0	(Norway) Rosenborg
Sigurbjörnsson 84'	Report

Hlíðarendi, Reykjavík
Attendance: 1,088
Referee: Rade Obrenović (Slovenia)
18 July 2018
19:45

Rosenborg (Norway)	3–1	(Iceland) Valur
Bendtner 55' (pen.), 90+4' (pen.); Trondsen 72'	Report	Sigurðsson 85' (pen.)

Lerkendal Stadion, Trondheim
Attendance: 10,604
Referee: Stefan Apostolov (Bulgaria)

Rosenborg won 3–2 on aggregate.

11 July 2018
19:00

Kukësi (Albania)	0–0	(Malta) Valletta
	Report

Loro Boriçi Stadium, Shkodër (Note: Kukësi played their home matches at Loro Boriçi Stadium, Shkodër, instead of their regular stadium Zeqir Ymeri Stadium, Kukës.)
Attendance: 350
Referee: Þóroddur Hjaltalín (Iceland)
17 July 2018
18:00

Valletta (Malta)	1–1	(Albania) Kukësi
Malano 67'	Report	Dzaria 84'

Centenary Stadium, Ta' Qali
Attendance: 1,307
Referee: Igor Pajač (Croatia)

1–1 on aggregate; Kukësi won on away goals.

10 July 2018
17:30 (18:30 UTC+3)

Flora (Estonia)	1–4	(Israel) Hapoel Be'er Sheva
Sappinen 73' (pen.)	Report	Sahar 18'; Tzedek 36' (pen.); Maman 53'; Ezra 85'

A. Le Coq Arena, Tallinn
Attendance: 1,106
Referee: Erik Lambrechts (Belgium)
17 July 2018
19:00 (20:00 UTC+3)

Hapoel Be'er Sheva (Israel)	3–1	(Estonia) Flora
Ezra 15'; Maman 27'; Melikson 48'	Report	Alliku 86'

Turner Stadium, Be'er Sheva
Attendance: 11,850
Referee: Tomasz Musiał (Poland)

Hapoel Be'er Sheva won 7–2 on aggregate.

11 July 2018
18:00 (19:00 UTC+3)

Spartaks Jūrmala (Latvia)	0–0	(Serbia) Red Star Belgrade
	Report

Skonto Stadium, Riga (Note: Spartaks Jūrmala played their home match at Skonto Stadium, Riga, instead of their regular stadium Slokas Stadium, Jūrmala.)
Attendance: 2,068
Referee: Mykola Balakin (Ukraine)
17 July 2018
20:30

Red Star Belgrade (Serbia)	2–0	(Latvia) Spartaks Jūrmala
Ben Nabouhane 78'; Krstičić 81'	Report

Red Star Stadium, Belgrade
Attendance: 23,868
Referee: Alper Ulusoy (Turkey)

Red Star Belgrade won 2–0 on aggregate.

10 July 2018
18:00 (20:00 UTC+4)

Alashkert (Armenia)	0–3	(Scotland) Celtic
	Report	Édouard 45+2'; Forrest 81'; McGregor 90'

Vazgen Sargsyan Republican Stadium, Yerevan (Note: Alashkert played their home match at Vazgen Sargsyan Republican Stadium, Yerevan, instead of their regular stadium Alashkert Stadium, Yerevan.)
Attendance: 4,948
Referee: Danilo Grujić (Serbia)
18 July 2018
20:45 (19:45 UTC+1)

Celtic (Scotland)	3–0	(Armenia) Alashkert
Dembélé 8', 19' (pen.); Forrest 35'	Report

Celtic Park, Glasgow
Attendance: 59,047
Referee: Horațiu Feșnic (Romania)

Celtic won 6–0 on aggregate.

11 July 2018
18:00

Spartak Trnava (Slovakia)	1–0	(Bosnia and Herzegovina) Zrinjski Mostar
Jirka 79'	Report

Anton Malatinský Stadium, Trnava
Attendance: 0 (Note: The match was played behind closed doors.)
Referee: Denis Scherbakov (Belarus)
18 July 2018
19:00

Zrinjski Mostar (Bosnia and Herzegovina)	1–1	(Slovakia) Spartak Trnava
Todorović 58'	Report	Godál 15'

Stadion pod Bijelim Brijegom, Mostar
Attendance: 5,100
Referee: Julian Weinberger (Austria)

Spartak Trnava won 2–1 on aggregate.

11 July 2018
16:00 (20:00 UTC+6)

Astana (Kazakhstan)	1–0	(Montenegro) Sutjeska
R. Murtazayev 29' (pen.)	Report

Astana Arena, Astana
Attendance: 20,500
Referee: Ferenc Karakó (Hungary)
18 July 2018
20:00

Sutjeska (Montenegro)	0–2	(Kazakhstan) Astana
	Report	Despotović 38'; Muzhikov 65'

Stadion kraj Bistrice, Nikšić
Attendance: 3,200
Referee: João Pinheiro (Portugal)

Astana won 3–0 on aggregate.

== Second qualifying round ==
The draw for the second qualifying round was held on 19 June 2018, 14:00 CEST.

=== Seeding ===
A total of 24 teams were involved in the second qualifying round draw.

- Champions Path: four teams entering in this round, and the 16 winners of the first qualifying round. They were divided into two groups of ten teams, where five teams were seeded and five teams were unseeded.
- League Path: four teams entering in this round. Two teams were seeded and two teams were unseeded.

Champions Path				League Path	
Group 1		Group 2		League Path	
Seeded	Unseeded	Seeded	Unseeded	Seeded	Unseeded
(Bulgaria) Ludogorets Razgrad; (Kazakhstan) Astana; (Azerbaijan) Qarabağ; (Croatia) Dinamo Zagreb; (Sweden) Malmö FF	(Denmark) Midtjylland; (Israel) Hapoel Be'er Sheva; (Hungary) Vidi; (Albania) Kukësi; (Romania) CFR Cluj	(Scotland) Celtic; (Lithuania) Sūduva; (Poland) Legia Warsaw; (Belarus) BATE Borisov; (Moldova) Sheriff Tiraspol	(Serbia) Red Star Belgrade; (Norway) Rosenborg; (Finland) HJK; (North Macedonia) Shkëndija; (Slovakia) Spartak Trnava	(Switzerland) Basel; (Netherlands) Ajax	(Greece) PAOK; (Austria) Sturm Graz

Notes

1. ^{†} Winners of the first qualifying round. Teams in italics defeated a team with a higher coefficient, thus effectively taking the coefficient of their opponent in the draw.

=== Summary ===
The first legs were played on 24 and 25 July, and the second legs on 31 July and 1 August 2018.

Team 1	Agg.	Team 2	1st leg	2nd leg
Champions Path
Astana (Kazakhstan)	2–1	(Denmark) Midtjylland	2–1	0–0
Ludogorets Razgrad (Bulgaria)	0–1	(Hungary) Vidi	0–0	0–1
Kukësi (Albania)	0–3	(Azerbaijan) Qarabağ	0–0	0–3
CFR Cluj (Romania)	1–2	(Sweden) Malmö FF	0–1	1–1
Dinamo Zagreb (Croatia)	7–2	(Israel) Hapoel Be'er Sheva	5–0	2–2
Red Star Belgrade (Serbia)	5–0	(Lithuania) Sūduva	3–0	2–0
BATE Borisov (Belarus)	2–1	(Finland) HJK	0–0	2–1
Shkëndija (North Macedonia)	1–0	(Moldova) Sheriff Tiraspol	1–0	0–0
Legia Warsaw (Poland)	1–2	(Slovakia) Spartak Trnava	0–2	1–0
Celtic (Scotland)	3–1	(Norway) Rosenborg	3–1	0–0
League Path
PAOK (Greece)	5–1	(Switzerland) Basel	2–1	3–0
Ajax (Netherlands)	5–1	(Austria) Sturm Graz	2–0	3–1

=== Champions Path matches ===
24 July 2018
16:00 (20:00 UTC+6)

Astana (Kazakhstan)	2–1	(Denmark) Midtjylland
Kleinheisler 31', 90+4'	Report	Wikheim 51'

Astana Arena, Astana
Attendance: 23,010
Referee: Radu Petrescu (Romania)
1 August 2018
19:00

Midtjylland (Denmark)	0–0	(Kazakhstan) Astana
	Report

MCH Arena, Herning
Attendance: 8,731
Referee: Juan Martínez Munuera (Spain)

Astana won 2–1 on aggregate.

25 July 2018
19:00 (20:00 UTC+3)

Ludogorets Razgrad (Bulgaria)	0–0	(Hungary) Vidi
	Report

Ludogorets Arena, Razgrad
Attendance: 5,327
Referee: Bojan Pandžić (Sweden)
1 August 2018
20:00

Vidi (Hungary)	1–0	(Bulgaria) Ludogorets Razgrad
Hadžić 45'	Report

Pancho Aréna, Felcsút
Attendance: 2,878
Referee: Manuel Schüttengruber (Austria)

Vidi won 1–0 on aggregate.

25 July 2018
19:00

Kukësi (Albania)	0–0	(Azerbaijan) Qarabağ
	Report

Loro Boriçi Stadium, Shkodër
Attendance: 700
Referee: Ola Hobber Nilsen (Norway)
1 August 2018
19:00 (21:00 UTC+4)

Qarabağ (Azerbaijan)	3–0	(Albania) Kukësi
Quintana 24' (pen.), 57' (pen.); Delarge 89'	Report

Tofiq Bahramov Republican Stadium, Baku
Attendance: 25,030
Referee: Peter Kralovič (Slovakia)

Qarabağ won 3–0 on aggregate.

24 July 2018
18:00 (19:00 UTC+3)

CFR Cluj (Romania)	0–1	(Sweden) Malmö FF
	Report	Strandberg 45'

Stadionul Dr. Constantin Rădulescu, Cluj-Napoca
Attendance: 6,950
Referee: Nikola Dabanović (Montenegro)
1 August 2018
19:15

Malmö FF (Sweden)	1–1	(Romania) CFR Cluj
Traustason 55'	Report	Djoković 36'

Stadion, Malmö
Attendance: 18,153
Referee: Andrew Dallas (Scotland)

Malmö FF won 2–1 on aggregate.

24 July 2018
20:00

Dinamo Zagreb (Croatia)	5–0	(Israel) Hapoel Be'er Sheva
Hajrović 22'; Oršić 28'; Ademi 51', 62'; Hodžić 82'	Report

Stadion Maksimir, Zagreb
Attendance: 9,099
Referee: Ali Palabıyık (Turkey)
31 July 2018
19:00 (20:00 UTC+3)

Hapoel Be'er Sheva (Israel)	2–2	(Croatia) Dinamo Zagreb
Ogu 14'; Stojanović 34' (o.g.)	Report	Budimir 49'; Hajrović 54'

Turner Stadium, Be'er Sheva
Attendance: 10,181
Referee: François Letexier (France)

Dinamo Zagreb won 7–2 on aggregate.

24 July 2018
20:30

Red Star Belgrade (Serbia)	3–0	(Lithuania) Sūduva
Ebecilio 23'; Radonjić 35', 58'	Report

Red Star Stadium, Belgrade
Attendance: 23,218
Referee: Bastian Dankert (Germany)
1 August 2018
19:30 (20:30 UTC+3)

Sūduva (Lithuania)	0–2	(Serbia) Red Star Belgrade
	Report	Ben Nabouhane 8'; Radonjić 38'

Sūduva Stadium, Marijampolė
Attendance: 4,020
Referee: Tiago Martins (Portugal)

Red Star Belgrade won 5–0 on aggregate.

25 July 2018
19:00 (20:00 UTC+3)

BATE Borisov (Belarus)	0–0	(Finland) HJK
	Report

Borisov Arena, Barysaw
Attendance: 11,567
Referee: Marco Di Bello (Italy)
1 August 2018
18:00 (19:00 UTC+3)

HJK (Finland)	1–2	(Belarus) BATE Borisov
Yaghoubi 28'	Report	Rafinha 20' (o.g.); Stasevich 24'

Telia 5G -areena, Helsinki
Attendance: 10,210
Referee: Jonathan Lardot (Belgium)

BATE Borisov won 2–1 on aggregate.

24 July 2018
20:15

Shkëndija (North Macedonia)	1–0	(Moldova) Sheriff Tiraspol
Ibraimi 24'	Report

Philip II Arena, Skopje
Attendance: 3,696
Referee: Mads-Kristoffer Kristoffersen (Denmark)
31 July 2018
19:00 (20:00 UTC+3)

Sheriff Tiraspol (Moldova)	0–0	(North Macedonia) Shkëndija
	Report

Sheriff Stadium, Tiraspol
Attendance: 6,319
Referee: Ville Nevalainen (Finland)

Shkëndija won 1–0 on aggregate.

24 July 2018
21:00

Legia Warsaw (Poland)	0–2	(Slovakia) Spartak Trnava
	Report	Grendel 16'; Vlasko 90+3'

Polish Army Stadium, Warsaw
Attendance: 15,527
Referee: Ádám Farkas (Hungary)
31 July 2018
20:30

Spartak Trnava (Slovakia)	0–1	(Poland) Legia Warsaw
	Report	Astiz 63'

Anton Malatinský Stadium, Trnava
Attendance: 17,204
Referee: Roi Reinshreiber (Israel)

Spartak Trnava won 2–1 on aggregate.

25 July 2018
20:45 (19:45 UTC+1)

Celtic (Scotland)	3–1	(Norway) Rosenborg
Édouard 43', 75'; Ntcham 46'	Report	Meling 16'

Celtic Park, Glasgow
Attendance: 51,184
Referee: Bart Vertenten (Belgium)
1 August 2018
20:45

Rosenborg (Norway)	0–0	(Scotland) Celtic
	Report

Lerkendal Stadion, Trondheim
Attendance: 14,263
Referee: Sandro Schärer (Switzerland)

Celtic won 3–1 on aggregate.

=== League Path matches ===
24 July 2018
19:30 (20:30 UTC+3)

PAOK (Greece)	2–1	(Switzerland) Basel
Cañas 32'; Prijović 80'	Report	Ajeti 82'

Toumba Stadium, Thessaloniki
Attendance: 24,670
Referee: Bobby Madley (England)
1 August 2018
20:00

Basel (Switzerland)	0–3	(Greece) PAOK
	Report	Varela 7'; Prijović 52'; El Kaddouri 60'

St. Jakob-Park, Basel
Attendance: 14,328
Referee: Paolo Valeri (Italy)

PAOK won 5–1 on aggregate.

25 July 2018
20:30

Ajax (Netherlands)	2–0	(Austria) Sturm Graz
Ziyech 15'; Schöne 57'	Report

Johan Cruyff Arena, Amsterdam
Attendance: 53,106
Referee: Alejandro Hernández Hernández (Spain)
1 August 2018
20:30

Sturm Graz (Austria)	1–3	(Netherlands) Ajax
Onana 89' (o.g.)	Report	Huntelaar 39', 77'; Tadić 48'

Liebenauer Stadium, Graz
Attendance: 15,172
Referee: Bartosz Frankowski (Poland)

Ajax won 5–1 on aggregate.

== Third qualifying round ==
The draw for the third qualifying round was held on 23 July 2018, 12:00 CEST.

=== Seeding ===
A total of 20 teams were involved in the third qualifying round draw.

- Champions Path: two teams entering in this round, and the 10 winners of the second qualifying round Champions Path. Six teams were seeded and six teams were unseeded.
- League Path: six teams entering in this round, and the two winners of the second qualifying round League Path. Four teams were seeded and four teams were unseeded. Teams from Ukraine and Russia could not be drawn into the same tie, and if such a pairing was drawn or was set to be drawn in the final tie, the second team drawn in the current tie would be moved to the next tie.

Champions Path		League Path	
Seeded	Unseeded	Seeded	Unseeded
(Austria) Red Bull Salzburg; (Hungary) Vidi; (Scotland) Celtic; (Slovakia) Spartak Trnava; (Kazakhstan) Astana; (Azerbaijan) Qarabağ	(Belarus) BATE Borisov; (Croatia) Dinamo Zagreb; (North Macedonia) Shkëndija; (Sweden) Malmö FF; (Serbia) Red Star Belgrade; (Greece) AEK Athens	(Portugal) Benfica; (Greece) PAOK; (Ukraine) Dynamo Kyiv; (Netherlands) Ajax	(Turkey) Fenerbahçe; (Russia) Spartak Moscow; (Belgium) Standard Liège; (Czech Republic) Slavia Prague

Notes

1. ^{†} Winners of the second qualifying round. Teams in italics defeated a team with a higher coefficient, thus effectively taking the coefficient of their opponent in the draw.

=== Summary ===
The first legs were played on 7 and 8 August, and the second legs on 14 August 2018.

Team 1	Agg.	Team 2	1st leg	2nd leg
Champions Path
Celtic (Scotland)	2–3	(Greece) AEK Athens	1–1	1–2
Red Bull Salzburg (Austria)	4–0	(North Macedonia) Shkëndija	3–0	1–0
Red Star Belgrade (Serbia)	3–2	(Slovakia) Spartak Trnava	1–1	2–1 (a.e.t.)
Qarabağ (Azerbaijan)	1–2	(Belarus) BATE Borisov	0–1	1–1
Astana (Kazakhstan)	0–3	(Croatia) Dinamo Zagreb	0–2	0–1
Malmö FF (Sweden)	1–1 (a)	(Hungary) Vidi	1–1	0–0
League Path
Standard Liège (Belgium)	2–5	(Netherlands) Ajax	2–2	0–3
Benfica (Portugal)	2–1	(Turkey) Fenerbahçe	1–0	1–1
Slavia Prague (Czech Republic)	1–3	(Ukraine) Dynamo Kyiv	1–1	0–2
PAOK (Greece)	3–2	(Russia) Spartak Moscow	3–2	0–0

=== Champions Path matches ===
8 August 2018
20:45 (19:45 UTC+1)

Celtic (Scotland)	1–1	(Greece) AEK Athens
McGregor 17'	Report	Klonaridis 44'

Celtic Park, Glasgow
Attendance: 54,370
Referee: Luca Banti (Italy)
14 August 2018
20:00 (21:00 UTC+3)

AEK Athens (Greece)	2–1	(Scotland) Celtic
Galo 6'; Livaja 50'	Report	Sinclair 78'

Olympic Stadium, Athens
Attendance: 32,300
Referee: Vladislav Bezborodov (Russia)

AEK Athens won 3–2 on aggregate.

8 August 2018
19:00

Red Bull Salzburg (Austria)	3–0	(North Macedonia) Shkëndija
Dabbur 16' (pen.), 45+3'; Samassékou 81' (pen.)	Report

Red Bull Arena, Wals-Siezenheim
Attendance: 10,050
Referee: Aliyar Aghayev (Azerbaijan)
14 August 2018
20:15

Shkëndija (North Macedonia)	0–1	(Austria) Red Bull Salzburg
	Report	Minamino 90+2'

Philip II Arena, Skopje
Attendance: 3,213
Referee: Tamás Bognár (Hungary)

Red Bull Salzburg won 4–0 on aggregate.

7 August 2018
20:30

Red Star Belgrade (Serbia)	1–1	(Slovakia) Spartak Trnava
Ben Nabouhane 23' (pen.)	Report	Grendel 25'

Red Star Stadium, Belgrade
Attendance: 37,112
Referee: Carlos del Cerro Grande (Spain)
14 August 2018
20:30

Spartak Trnava (Slovakia)	1–2 (a.e.t.)	(Serbia) Red Star Belgrade
Bakoš 6'	Report	Ben Nabouhane 7'; Radonjić 98'

Anton Malatinský Stadium, Trnava
Attendance: 18,032
Referee: Serdar Gözübüyük (Netherlands)

Red Star Belgrade won 3–2 on aggregate.

7 August 2018
19:00 (21:00 UTC+4)

Qarabağ (Azerbaijan)	0–1	(Belarus) BATE Borisov
	Report	Drahun 36'

Tofiq Bahramov Republican Stadium, Baku
Attendance: 29,000
Referee: Andreas Ekberg (Sweden)
14 August 2018
19:00 (20:00 UTC+3)

BATE Borisov (Belarus)	1–1	(Azerbaijan) Qarabağ
Ivanić 20'	Report	Míchel 54'

Borisov Arena, Barysaw
Attendance: 12,489
Referee: Andris Treimanis (Latvia)

BATE Borisov won 2–1 on aggregate.

7 August 2018
16:00 (20:00 UTC+6)

Astana (Kazakhstan)	0–2	(Croatia) Dinamo Zagreb
	Report	Budimir 39'; Olmo 84'

Astana Arena, Astana
Attendance: 26,500
Referee: John Beaton (Scotland)
14 August 2018
20:00

Dinamo Zagreb (Croatia)	1–0	(Kazakhstan) Astana
Gavranović 74'	Report

Stadion Maksimir, Zagreb
Attendance: 11,903
Referee: Gediminas Mažeika (Lithuania)

Dinamo Zagreb won 3–0 on aggregate.

7 August 2018
19:15

Malmö FF (Sweden)	1–1	(Hungary) Vidi
Christiansen 62'	Report	Nego 71'

Stadion, Malmö
Attendance: 17,209
Referee: Matej Jug (Slovenia)
14 August 2018
20:00

Vidi (Hungary)	0–0	(Sweden) Malmö FF
	Report

Pancho Aréna, Felcsút
Attendance: 3,432
Referee: Xavier Estrada Fernández (Spain)

1–1 on aggregate; Vidi won on away goals.

=== League Path matches ===
7 August 2018
20:00

Standard Liège (Belgium)	2–2	(Netherlands) Ajax
Carcela-González 67'; Emond 90+4' (pen.)	Report	Huntelaar 19'; Tadić 34'

Stade Maurice Dufrasne, Liège
Attendance: 20,355
Referee: Tobias Stieler (Germany)
14 August 2018
20:30

Ajax (Netherlands)	3–0	(Belgium) Standard Liège
Huntelaar 30'; De Ligt 34'; Neres 46'	Report

Johan Cruyff Arena, Amsterdam
Attendance: 51,841
Referee: Ivan Kružliak (Slovakia)

Ajax won 5–2 on aggregate.

7 August 2018
21:00 (20:00 UTC+1)

Benfica (Portugal)	1–0	(Turkey) Fenerbahçe
Cervi 69'	Report

Estádio da Luz, Lisbon
Attendance: 57,878
Referee: Aleksei Kulbakov (Belarus)
14 August 2018
20:00 (21:00 UTC+3)

Fenerbahçe (Turkey)	1–1	(Portugal) Benfica
Potuk 45+1'	Report	Fernandes 26'

Şükrü Saracoğlu Stadium, Istanbul
Attendance: 42,245
Referee: Slavko Vinčić (Slovenia)

Benfica won 2–1 on aggregate.

7 August 2018
19:30

Slavia Prague (Czech Republic)	1–1	(Ukraine) Dynamo Kyiv
Hušbauer 90+5' (pen.)	Report	Verbič 82'

Eden Arena, Prague
Attendance: 19,370
Referee: Craig Pawson (England)
14 August 2018
18:30 (19:30 UTC+3)

Dynamo Kyiv (Ukraine)	2–0	(Czech Republic) Slavia Prague
Verbič 11'; Besyedin 74'	Report

Olimpiyskiy National Sports Complex, Kyiv
Attendance: 39,318
Referee: Daniel Stefański (Poland)

Dynamo Kyiv won 3–1 on aggregate.

8 August 2018
19:00 (20:00 UTC+3)

PAOK (Greece)	3–2	(Russia) Spartak Moscow
Prijović 29' (pen.); Limnios 37'; Pelkas 44'	Report	Popov 7'; Promes 17'

Toumba Stadium, Thessaloniki
Attendance: 24,463
Referee: Orel Grinfeld (Israel)
14 August 2018
19:30 (20:30 UTC+3)

Spartak Moscow (Russia)	0–0	(Greece) PAOK
	Report

Otkritie Arena, Moscow
Attendance: 40,385
Referee: Ruddy Buquet (France)

PAOK won 3–2 on aggregate.

== Play-off round ==
The draw for the play-off round was held on 6 August 2018, 12:00 CEST.

=== Seeding ===
A total of 12 teams were involved in the play-off round draw.

- Champions Path: two teams entering in this round, and the six winners of the third qualifying round Champions Path. Four teams were seeded and four teams were unseeded.
- League Path: the four winners of the third qualifying round League Path. Two teams were seeded and two teams were unseeded. Teams from Ukraine and Russia could not be drawn into the same tie, and to prevent such a potential pairing, the four teams were divided into two pairings prior to the draw.

Champions Path		League Path			
Champions Path		Pairing 1		Pairing 2	
Seeded	Unseeded	Seeded	Unseeded	Seeded	Unseeded
(Austria) Red Bull Salzburg; (Netherlands) PSV Eindhoven; (Greece) AEK Athens; (Croatia) Dinamo Zagreb	(Belarus) BATE Borisov; (Switzerland) Young Boys; (Hungary) Vidi; (Serbia) Red Star Belgrade	(Portugal) Benfica	(Greece) PAOK	(Ukraine) Dynamo Kyiv	(Netherlands) Ajax

Notes

1. ^{†} Winners of the third qualifying round. Teams in italics defeated a team with a higher coefficient, thus effectively taking the coefficient of their opponent in the draw.

=== Summary ===
The first legs were played on 21 and 22 August, and the second legs on 28 and 29 August 2018.

Team 1	Agg.	Team 2	1st leg	2nd leg
Champions Path
Red Star Belgrade (Serbia)	2–2 (a)	(Austria) Red Bull Salzburg	0–0	2–2
BATE Borisov (Belarus)	2–6	(Netherlands) PSV Eindhoven	2–3	0–3
Young Boys (Switzerland)	3–2	(Croatia) Dinamo Zagreb	1–1	2–1
Vidi (Hungary)	2–3	(Greece) AEK Athens	1–2	1–1
League Path
Benfica (Portugal)	5–2	(Greece) PAOK	1–1	4–1
Ajax (Netherlands)	3–1	(Ukraine) Dynamo Kyiv	3–1	0–0

=== Champions Path matches ===
21 August 2018
21:00

Red Star Belgrade (Serbia)	0–0	(Austria) Red Bull Salzburg
	Report

Red Star Stadium, Belgrade
Attendance: 0 (Note: The Red Star Belgrade v Red Bull Salzburg match was played behind closed doors due to punishment by UEFA.)
Referee: Daniele Orsato (Italy)
29 August 2018
21:00

Red Bull Salzburg (Austria)	2–2	(Serbia) Red Star Belgrade
Dabbur 45', 48' (pen.)	Report	Ben Nabouhane 65', 66'

Red Bull Arena, Wals-Siezenheim
Attendance: 26,500
Referee: Cüneyt Çakır (Turkey)

2–2 on aggregate; Red Star Belgrade won on away goals.

21 August 2018
21:00 (22:00 UTC+3)

BATE Borisov (Belarus)	2–3	(Netherlands) PSV Eindhoven
Tuominen 9'; Hleb 88'	Report	Pereiro 35' (pen.); Lozano 61'; Malen 89'

Borisov Arena, Barysaw
Attendance: 9,284
Referee: Felix Zwayer (Germany)
29 August 2018
21:00

PSV Eindhoven (Netherlands)	3–0	(Belarus) BATE Borisov
Bergwijn 14'; De Jong 36'; Lozano 62'	Report

Philips Stadion, Eindhoven
Attendance: 34,200
Referee: Anthony Taylor (England)

PSV Eindhoven won 6–2 on aggregate.

22 August 2018
21:00

Young Boys (Switzerland)	1–1	(Croatia) Dinamo Zagreb
Mbabu 2'	Report	Oršić 40'

Stade de Suisse, Bern
Attendance: 21,463
Referee: Alberto Undiano Mallenco (Spain)
28 August 2018
21:00

Dinamo Zagreb (Croatia)	1–2	(Switzerland) Young Boys
Hajrović 7'	Report	Hoarau 64' (pen.), 66'

Stadion Maksimir, Zagreb
Attendance: 28,137
Referee: Björn Kuipers (Netherlands)

Young Boys won 3–2 on aggregate.

22 August 2018
21:00

Vidi (Hungary)	1–2	(Greece) AEK Athens
Lazović 67'	Report	Klonaridis 34'; Bakasetas 49'

Groupama Arena, Budapest
Attendance: 10,681
Referee: Gianluca Rocchi (Italy)
28 August 2018
21:00 (22:00 UTC+3)

AEK Athens (Greece)	1–1	(Hungary) Vidi
Mantalos 48' (pen.)	Report	Nego 57'

Olympic Stadium, Athens
Attendance: 29,774
Referee: Szymon Marciniak (Poland)

AEK Athens won 3–2 on aggregate.

=== League Path matches ===
21 August 2018
21:00 (20:00 UTC+1)

Benfica (Portugal)	1–1	(Greece) PAOK
Pizzi 45+1' (pen.)	Report	Warda 76'

Estádio da Luz, Lisbon
Attendance: 44,084
Referee: Milorad Mažić (Serbia)
29 August 2018
21:00 (22:00 UTC+3)

PAOK (Greece)	1–4	(Portugal) Benfica
Prijović 13'	Report	Jardel 20'; Salvio 26' (pen.), 50' (pen.); Pizzi 39'

Toumba Stadium, Thessaloniki
Attendance: 26,725
Referee: Felix Brych (Germany)

Benfica won 5–2 on aggregate.

22 August 2018
21:00

Ajax (Netherlands)	3–1	(Ukraine) Dynamo Kyiv
Van de Beek 2'; Ziyech 35'; Tadić 43'	Report	Kędziora 16'

Johan Cruyff Arena, Amsterdam
Attendance: 52,706
Referee: Clément Turpin (France)
28 August 2018
21:00 (22:00 UTC+3)

Dynamo Kyiv (Ukraine)	0–0	(Netherlands) Ajax
	Report

Olimpiyskiy National Sports Complex, Kyiv
Attendance: 40,131
Referee: Damir Skomina (Slovenia)

Ajax won 3–1 on aggregate.

== Top goalscorers ==
There were 211 goals scored in 91 matches in the qualifying phase and play-off round, for an average of 2.32 goals per match.

Rank	Player	Team	Goals
1	(Comoros) El Fardou Ben Nabouhane	(Serbia) Red Star Belgrade	6
2	(North Macedonia) Besart Ibraimi	(North Macedonia) Shkëndija	5
3	(Israel) Moanes Dabour	(Austria) Red Bull Salzburg	4
3	(Netherlands) Klaas-Jan Huntelaar	(Netherlands) Ajax	4
3	(Serbia) Aleksandar Prijović	(Greece) PAOK	4
3	(Serbia) Nemanja Radonjić	(Serbia) Red Star Belgrade	4
3	(Poland) Jakub Świerczok	(Bulgaria) Ludogorets Razgrad	4
8	(Curaçao) Rigino Cicilia	(Lithuania) Sūduva	3
8	(France) Odsonne Édouard	(Scotland) Celtic	3
8	(Bosnia and Herzegovina) Izet Hajrović	(Croatia) Dinamo Zagreb	3
8	(Sweden) Carlos Strandberg	(Sweden) Malmö FF	3
8	(Serbia) Dušan Tadić	(Netherlands) Ajax	3
13	29 players		2
