= 2023–24 FK Partizan season =

FK Partizan 77th season

FK Partizan
2023–24 season
- President: Milorad Vučelić (until 30 August 2023)
- Head coach: Igor Duljaj (until 29 April 2024) Albert Nađ
- Stadium: Partizan Stadium
- Serbian SuperLiga: 2nd
- Serbian Cup: Semifinal
- Europa Conference League: Play-Off round
- Top goalscorer: League: Matheus Saldanha (17); All: Matheus Saldanha (18)
| Home colours | Away colours | Third colours |
- All statistics correct as of 25 May 2024.

The 2023–24 season is Fudbalski Klub Partizan's 77th season in existence and the club's 18th competing in the Serbian SuperLiga.

== Transfers ==
=== In ===
| Date | Position | Name | From | Type | Ref. |
|---|---|---|---|---|---|
| 19 June 2023 | DF | (Serbia) Nikola Antić | (Russia) Khimki | Transfer | |
| 27 June 2023 | MF | (Montenegro) Aleksandar Šćekić | (Israel) Hapoel Haifa | Free Transfer | |
| 29 June 2023 | GK | (Serbia) Aleksandar Jovanović | (Cyprus) Apollon Limassol | Transfer | |
| 3 July 2023 | MF | (Senegal) Franck Kanouté | (Belgium) Cercle Brugge | Transfer | |
| 3 July 2023 | FW | (Serbia) Nemanja Nikolić | (Serbia) Vojvodina | Free Transfer | |
| 17 July 2023 | FW | (Curaçao) Xander Severina | (Netherlands) ADO Den Haag | Free Transfer | |
| 25 July 2023 | FW | (Democratic Republic of the Congo) Aldo Kalulu | (France) Sochaux | Free Transfer | |
| 28 July 2023 | FW | (Brazil) Matheus Saldanha | (Japan) JEF United Chiba | Transfer | |
| 28 July 2023 | DF | (Serbia) Aranđel Stojković | (Serbia) TSC | Transfer | |
| 23 August 2023 | MF | (Norway) Ghayas Zahid | (Turkey) Ankaragücü | Free Transfer | |
| 13 September 2023 | DF | (Belgium) Nathan de Medina | (Germany) Eintracht Braunschweig | Free Transfer | |
| 16 January 2024 | DF | (Serbia) Nikola Miličić | (Serbia) Radnički 1923 | Transfer | |
| 17 January 2024 | GK | (Serbia) Miloš Krunić | (Saudi Arabia) Hajer | Free Transfer | |
| 19 January 2024 | MF | (Ghana) Leonard Owusu | (Norway) Odd | Free Transfer | |
| 20 January 2024 | MF | (Ecuador) Denil Castillo | (Ukraine) Shakhtar Donetsk | Loan | |
| 23 January 2024 | MF | (South Korea) Goh Young-jun | (South Korea) Pohang Steelers | Transfer | |
| 13 February 2024 | FW | (Serbia) Aleksa Janković | (Serbia) Čukarički | Free Transfer | |
| 14 February 2024 | DF | (Serbia) Bojan Kovačević | (Serbia) Čukarički | Transfer | |

=== Out ===
| Date | Position | Name | To | Type | Ref. |
|---|---|---|---|---|---|
| 29 May 2023 | MF | (Serbia) Ljubomir Fejsa | | Released | |
| 8 June 2023 | DF | (Serbia) Slobodan Urošević | (Cyprus) Aris Limassol | Transfer | |
| 15 June 2023 | FW | (Serbia) Vanja Vlahović | (Italy) Atalanta | Transfer | |
| 16 June 2023 | MF | (Mali) Hamidou Traore | (Saudi Arabia) Al-Safa | Released | |
| 19 June 2023 | DF | (Serbia) Luka Subotić | (Serbia) Čukarički | Free Transfer | |
| 20 June 2023 | FW | (Serbia) Savo Arambašić | (Serbia) Novi Pazar | Free Transfer | |
| 25 June 2023 | FW | (Cape Verde) Ricardo Gomes | (Qatar) Al-Shamal | Transfer | |
| 26 June 2023 | MF | (Colombia) Andrés Colorado | (Colombia) Cortuluá | Loan Return | |
| 26 June 2023 | GK | (Serbia) Milan Lukač | | End of contract | |
| 30 June 2023 | DF | (Montenegro) Igor Vujačić | (Russia) Rubin Kazan | Transfer | |
| 1 July 2023 | DF | (Serbia) Mateja Stašević | (Serbia) Vršac | Free Transfer | |
| 15 July 2023 | MF | (Cape Verde) Patrick Andrade | (Azerbaijan) Qarabağ | Free Transfer | |
| 24 July 2023 | RW | (Montenegro) Marko Brnović | (Montenegro) Rudar Pljevlja | Loan | |
| 27 July 2023 | GK | (Serbia) Aleksandar Popović | (Slovakia) DAC 1904 | Transfer | |
| 1 September 2023 | LW | (Serbia) Nemanja Jović | (Portugal) Estoril | Released | |
| 7 September 2023 | RW | (Mali) Fousseni Diabaté | (Switzerland) Lausanne-Sport | Transfer | |
| 15 September 2023 | FW | (Serbia) Milan Aleksić | (Serbia) Radnički 1923 U19 | Free Transfer | |
| 19 September 2023 | FW | (Serbia) Nikola Terzić | (Israel) Hapoel Umm al-Fahm | Free Transfer | |
| 21 September 2023 | LW | (Serbia) Nemanja Ilić | (Slovakia) AS Trenčín U19 | Free Transfer | |
| 16 January 2024 | FW | (Serbia) Mihajlo Petković | (Serbia) Novi Pazar | Loan | |
| 17 January 2024 | MF | (Serbia) Kristijan Belić | (Netherlands) AZ Alkmaar | Transfer | |
| 18 January 2024 | DF | (Serbia) Mihajlo Ilić | (Italy) Bologna | Transfer | |
| 9 February 2024 | FW | (Netherlands) Queensy Menig | (Turkey) Sivasspor | Transfer | |
| 13 February 2024 | FW | (Serbia) Nikola Lakčević | (Serbia) Brodarac | Loan | |
| 15 February 2024 | DF | (Serbia) Zlatan Šehović | (Kazakhstan) Ordabasy | Loan | |
| 17 February 2024 | RW | (Montenegro) Marko Brnović | (Bosnia and Herzegovina) Sloga Meridian | Free Transfer | |
| 17 February 2024 | FW | (Serbia) Janko Jevremović | (Serbia) Kolubara | Loan | |

== Players ==
=== Squad ===
| No. | Name | Nationality | Position (s) | Date of birth (age) | Signed from | Notes |
Goalkeepers
| 1 | Aleksandar Jovanović | (Serbia) | GK | 6 December 1992 (age 33) | (Cyprus) Apollon Limassol | |
| 27 | Vukašin Jovanović | (Serbia) | GK | 30 September 2007 (age 18) | Youth system | |
| 33 | Miloš Krunić | (Serbia) | GK | 22 November 1996 (age 29) | (Saudi Arabia) Hajer | |
| 41 | Vanja Radulaški | (Serbia) | GK | 4 April 2006 (age 20) | Youth system | |
| 85 | Nemanja Stevanović | (Serbia) | GK | 8 May 1992 (age 34) | (Serbia) Čukarički | |
Defenders
| 2 | Aranđel Stojković | (Serbia) | RB | 2 March 1995 (age 31) | (Serbia) TSC | |
| 4 | Siniša Saničanin | (Bosnia and Herzegovina) | CB | 24 April 1995 (age 31) | (Serbia) Vojvodina | |
| 5 | Nikola Antić | (Serbia) | LB | 4 January 1994 (age 32) | (Russia) Khimki | |
| 6 | Svetozar Marković | (Serbia) | CB | 23 March 2000 (age 26) | (Greece) Olympiacos | Captain |
| 17 | Marko Živković | (Serbia) | RB | 17 May 1994 (age 32) | (Serbia) Voždovac | |
| 25 | Nathan de Medina | (Belgium) | CB | 8 October 1997 (age 28) | (Germany) Eintracht Braunschweig | |
| 26 | Aleksandar Filipović | (Serbia) | LB | 20 December 1994 (age 31) | (Belarus) Bate Borisov | |
| 30 | Milan Roganović | (Montenegro) | RB | 28 October 2005 (age 20) | Youth system | |
| 36 | Bojan Kovačević | (Serbia) | CB | 22 May 2004 (age 22) | (Serbia) Čukarički | |
| 40 | Nikola Miličić | (Serbia) | CB | 4 July 2004 (age 22) | (Serbia) Radnički 1923 | |
Midfielders
| 8 | Franck Kanouté | (Senegal) | CM | 13 December 1998 (age 27) | (Belgium) Cercle Brugge | |
| 10 | Bibras Natkho | (Israel) | CM | 18 February 1988 (age 38) | (Greece) Olympiacos | Vice-captain |
| 16 | Leonard Owusu | (Ghana) | CM | 3 June 1997 (age 29) | (Norway) Odd | |
| 18 | Ognjen Ugrešić | (Serbia) | MF | 15 July 2006 (age 20) | Youth system | |
| 19 | Aleksandar Šćekić | (Montenegro) | DM | 12 December 1991 (age 34) | (Israel) Hapoel Haifa | |
| 21 | Denil Castillo | (Ecuador) | MF | 24 March 2004 (age 22) | (Ukraine) Shakhtar Donetsk | Loan |
| 29 | Ghayas Zahid | (Norway) | MF | 8 September 1994 (age 32) | (Turkey) Ankaragücü | |
| 45 | Mateja Stjepanović | (Serbia) | DM | 20 February 2004 (age 22) | Youth system | |
| 55 | Danilo Pantić | (Serbia) | MF | 26 October 1996 (age 29) | (England) Chelsea | |
| 77 | Goh Young-jun | (South Korea) | MF | 9 July 2001 (age 25) | (South Korea) Pohang Steelers | |
Forwards
| 7 | Xander Severina | (Curaçao) | LW | 12 April 2001 (age 25) | (Netherlands) ADO Den Haag | |
| 11 | Matheus Saldanha | (Brazil) | CF | 18 August 1999 (age 27) | (Japan) JEF United Chiba | |
| 14 | Samed Baždar | (Serbia) | CF | 31 January 2004 (age 22) | Youth system | |
| 15 | Aldo Kalulu | (Democratic Republic of the Congo) | CF | 21 January 1996 (age 30) | (France) Sochaux | |
| 20 | Andrija Pavlović | (Serbia) | CF | 16 November 1993 (age 32) | (Denmark) Brøndby IF | |
| 23 | Nemanja Nikolić | (Serbia) | CF | 19 October 1992 (age 33) | (Serbia) Vojvodina | |
| 42 | Dušan Jovanović | (Serbia) | CF | 15 February 2006 (age 20) | Youth system | |
| 43 | Nemanja Trifunović | (Serbia) | LW | 29 June 2004 (age 22) | Youth system | |
| 44 | Bogdan Mirčetić | (Serbia) | RW | 25 October 2005 (age 20) | Youth system | |
| 99 | Aleksa Janković | (Serbia) | RW | 12 April 2000 (age 26) | (Serbia) Čukarički | |

== Friendlies ==
| 2 July 2023 Friendly | Partizan (Serbia) | 5–0 | (Slovenia) Tehnotim Pesnica | Maribor, Slovenia |
| 17:30 | Trifunović 53'; Aleksić 57'; Terzić 60', 82'; Natcho 82' (pen.) | Report | | Referee: |

| 6 July 2023 Friendly | Partizan (Serbia) | 0–2 | (Czech Republic) Bohemians Praha 1905 | Ptuj, Slovenia |
| 16:00 | | Report | Puškáč 16'; Matoušek 55' | Stadium: Ptuj City Stadium; Referee: |

| 10 July 2023 Friendly | Partizan (Serbia) | 3–0 | (Slovenia) Drava Ptuj | Ptuj, Slovenia |
| 17:30 | Pavlović 63', 89'; Saničanin 90+3' | Report | | Stadium: Ptuj City Stadium; Referee: |

| 14 July 2023 Friendly | Partizan (Serbia) | 1–2 | (Austria) Sturm Graz | Graz, Austria |
| 15:00 | Nikolić 11' | Report | Jantscher 38'; Marković 53' (o.g.) | Referee: |

| 20 July 2023 Friendly | Partizan (Serbia) | 3–1 | (Serbia) Mladost Novi Sad | Belgrade, Serbia |
| 18:00 | Severina 9', 35'; Belić 40' | Report | Kokanović 23' | Stadium: SC Partizan-Teleoptik; Referee: |

| 22 July 2023 Friendly | Partizan (Serbia) | 1–1 | (Serbia) Metalac Gornji Milanovac | Belgrade, Serbia |
| 18:00 | Baždar 42' | Report | Luković 75' | Stadium: SC Partizan-Teleoptik; Referee: |

| 10 September 2023 Friendly | Partizan (Serbia) | 2–1 | (Montenegro) Budućnost Podgorica | Belgrade, Serbia |
| 16:45 | Pavlović 7'; Natcho 12' (pen.) | Report | Grbić 44' | Stadium: SC Partizan-Teleoptik |

| 17 October 2023 Friendly | Partizan (Serbia) | 2–1 | (Serbia) OFK Beograd | Belgrade, Serbia |
| 12:00 | Nikolić 12'; Baždar 52' | Report | Stanković 64' | Stadium: SC Partizan-Teleoptik |

| 20 January 2024 Friendly | Partizan (Serbia) | 4–0 | (Serbia) Mladost Lučani | Larnaca, Cyprus |
| 13:30 | Zahid 4'; Baždar 28', 40'; Petrović 48' | Report | | Stadium: Antonis Papadopoulos Stadium |

| 24 January 2024 Friendly | Partizan (Serbia) | 4–0 | (Cyprus) AO Ayia Napa | Larnaca, Cyprus |
| 13:30 | Natkho 49'; Kalulu 63'; Severina 82'; Saldanha 89' | Report |

| 28 January 2024 Friendly | Partizan (Serbia) | 1–0 | (Bulgaria) Botev Vratsa | Larnaca, Cyprus |
| 13:30 | Saldanha 23' | Report |

| 21 February 2024 Friendly | Partizan (Serbia) | 0–1 | (Serbia) Čukarički | Belgrade, Serbia |
| | | Report | Cvetković 59' | Stadium: SC Partizan-Teleoptik; Referee: Ivan Stamenković |

== Competitions ==
=== Overview ===
| Competition | Record | | | | | | | |
| Competition | P | W | D | L | GF | GA | GD | Win % |
|---|---|---|---|---|---|---|---|---|
| Serbian SuperLiga | 37 | 24 | 6 | 7 | 80 | 48 | +32 | 64.86 |
| Serbian Cup | 4 | 1 | 2 | 1 | 3 | 4 | −1 | 25.00 |
| UEFA Europa Conference League | 4 | 1 | 0 | 3 | 2 | 8 | −6 | 25.00 |
| Total | 45 | 26 | 8 | 11 | 85 | 60 | +25 | 57.78 |

=== Serbian SuperLiga ===
==== Regular season ====
===== League table =====
| Pos | Team | Pld | W | D | L | GF | GA | GD | Pts | Qualification |
|---|---|---|---|---|---|---|---|---|---|---|
| 1 | Red Star Belgrade | 30 | 25 | 2 | 3 | 77 | 22 | +55 | 77 | Qualification for the Championship round |
| 2 | Partizan | 30 | 22 | 4 | 4 | 66 | 35 | +31 | 70 | Qualification for the Championship round |
| 3 | TSC | 30 | 17 | 9 | 4 | 57 | 29 | +28 | 60 | Qualification for the Championship round |
| 4 | Vojvodina | 30 | 14 | 8 | 8 | 49 | 42 | +7 | 50 | Qualification for the Championship round |
| 5 | Radnički 1923 | 30 | 16 | 2 | 12 | 46 | 46 | 0 | 50 | Qualification for the Championship round |

Source: SuperLiga (in Serbian)
Rules for classification: 1) Points; 2) Head-to-head points; 3) Head-to-head goal difference; 4) Head-to-head goals scored; 5) Head-to-head away goals scored (if two teams tied); 6) Goal difference; 7) Goals scored; 8) Fair play ranking; 9) Draw.

==== Results by matchday ====
| Round | 1 | 2 | 3 | 4 | 5 | 6 | 7 | 8 | 9 | 10 | 11 | 12 | 13 | 14 | 15 | 16 | 17 | 18 | 19 | 20 | 21 | 22 | 23 | 24 | 25 | 26 | 27 | 28 | 29 | 30 |
|---|---|---|---|---|---|---|---|---|---|---|---|---|---|---|---|---|---|---|---|---|---|---|---|---|---|---|---|---|---|---|
| Ground | A | A | H | A | H | A | H | A | H | A | H | A | H | A | H | H | H | A | H | A | H | A | H | A | H | A | H | A | H | A |
| Result | D | W | W | W | W | W | W | W | W | W | W | W | W | W | W | L | W | L | D | W | W | W | W | D | L | D | W | W | W | L |
| Position | 6 | 6 | 3 | 4 | 3 | 3 | 2 | 2 | 2 | 1 | 1 | 1 | 1 | 1 | 1 | 1 | 1 | 2 | 1 | 1 | 1 | 1 | 1 | 1 | 2 | 2 | 2 | 2 | 2 | 2 |

Updated to match(es) played on 14 April 2024. Source: Partizan
A = Away; H = Home; W = Win; D = Draw; L = Loss

=== Results ===
| 29 July 2023 1 | TSC | 3–3 | Partizan | Bačka Topola |
| 21:00 | Antonić 12'; Čalušić (yellow card) 29'; Đakovac 45+5' (pen.); Cvetković (yellow card) 56'; Stojić (yellow card) 78' (goal) 90+7'; Petrović (yellow card) 90+5' | Report | Natkho 40'; Belić 43'; Pantić (yellow card) 45+6'; Saldanha 78'; Kalulu (yellow card) 90' (yellow-red card) 90+5' | Stadium: TSC Arena; Referee: (Serbia) Milan Mitić |

| 6 August 2023 2 | Vojvodina | 0–2 | Partizan | Novi Sad |
| 19:00 | Bukinac (yellow card) 5'; Lazarević (yellow card) 19'; Bolingi (yellow card) 63' | Report | Ilić (yellow card) 14'; Kanouté (yellow card) 19'; Saldanha 47'; Menig 74'; Šćekić (yellow card) 87' | Stadium: Karađorđe Stadium; Attendance: 8,000; Referee: (Serbia) Miloš Milanović |

| 13 August 2023 3 | Partizan | 2–1 | Radnički Niš | Belgrade |
| 19:30 | Natkho 79' (pen.); Severina 87' | Report | Petrov 12'; Yamkam (yellow card) 35'; Rosić (yellow card) 61'; Vlajković (yellow card) 75' | Stadium: Partizan Stadium; Attendance: 2,100; Referee: (Serbia) Pavle Tomić |

| 25 October 2023* 4 | Radnički 1923 | 0–4 | Partizan | Kragujevac |
| 14:00 | Mitrović (yellow card) 50' (yellow-red card) 69'; Vidović (yellow card) 61'; Vidosavljević (yellow card) 67'; Anthony (yellow card) 77' | Report | Saldanha (yellow card) 32' (goal) 81'; Kalulu 34'; Šćekić (yellow card) 55'; Nikolić 63', 87' | Stadium: Čika Dača Stadium; Attendance: 3,000; Referee: (Serbia) Novak Simović |

| 27 August 2023 5 | Partizan | 3–1 | Javor Ivanjica | Belgrade |
| 19:35 | Kanouté (yellow card) 12'; Menig 22'; Stojković 57'; Belić (yellow card) 60'; Saldanha 69' | Report | Kopitović (yellow card) 43'; Dolmagić 49' (yellow card) 90+2'; Petrović (yellow card) 62' | Stadium: Partizan Stadium; Attendance: 1,000; Referee: (Serbia) Nenad Minaković |

| 3 September 2023 6 | IMT | 2–3 | Partizan | Belgrade |
| 20:00 | Vukić 5'; Kodžić 56'; Luković (yellow card) 67'; Charles (yellow card) 75'; Delević (yellow card) 90+7' | Report | Saldanha (yellow card) 52' (goal) 70'; Menig (yellow card) 66'; Natkho 90' (pen.); Nikolić 90+5' | Stadium: Voždovac Stadium; Attendance: 1,300; Referee: (Serbia) Pavle Ilić |

| 17 September 2023 7 | Partizan | 3–2 | Radnik Surdulica | Belgrade |
| 19:35 | Kanouté (yellow card) 35'; Šćekić (red card) 43'; Zahid 61'; Natkho (yellow card) 65' (goal) 90+8' (pen.); Saldanha 81' (pen.); Jovanović (yellow card) 90+5' | Report | Gašić 6'; Duronjić 28'; Kunić (yellow card) 45+1'; Abubakar (yellow card) 60'; Ranđelović (yellow card) 65'; Kočić (yellow card) 82'; Oreščanin (red card) 90+4'; Njie (yellow card) 90+12' | Stadium: Partizan Stadium; Attendance: 1,500; Referee: (Serbia) Dejan Trifković |

| 22 September 2023 8 | Železničar Pančevo | 1–2 | Partizan | Pančevo |
| 20:00 | Đorđević 32' (pen.); Purtić (yellow card) 80' | Report | Saldanha 27' (yellow card) 31'; Zahid 81' | Stadium: SC Mladost Stadium; Attendance: 2,000; Referee: (Serbia) Stanko Ostraćanin |

| 20 December 2023* 9 | Partizan | 2–1 | Red Star Belgrade | Belgrade |
| 18:00 | Natkho 41' (pen.); Saldanha 66' (yellow card) 89'; Nikolić (yellow card) 90'; Jovanović (yellow card) 90+6' | Report | Ndiaye 71'; Mijatović (yellow card) 90+3' | Stadium: Partizan Stadium; Attendance: 12,000; Referee: (Serbia) Nenad Minaković |

| 1 October 2023 10 | Napredak Kruševac | 0–2 | Partizan | Kruševac |
| 17:00 | Đeković (yellow card) 21'; Marinković (yellow card) 81' | Report | Kalulu 45+2'; Jovanović 75' (o.g.) | Stadium: Mladost Stadium; Attendance: 6,000; Referee: (Serbia) Nenad Minaković |

| 7 October 2023 11 | Partizan | 2–0 | Mladost Lučani | Belgrade |
| 18:30 | Natkho 57' (pen.); Zahid 69' | Report | Molls (yellow card) 81' | Stadium: Partizan Stadium; Attendance: 2,000; Referee: (Serbia) Miloš Milanović |

| 20 October 2023 12 | Spartak Subotica | 0–3 | Partizan | Subotica |
| 20:00 | | Report | Kanouté (yellow card) 22'; Natkho (yellow card) 63'; Stjepanović (yellow card) 70'; Marković 70'; Zahid 77'; Saldanha 81' | Stadium: Subotica City Stadium; Attendance: 5,000; Referee: (Serbia) Pavle Ilić |

| 29 October 2023 13 | Partizan | 3–0 | Voždovac | Belgrade |
| 18:30 | Severina 54'; Zahid 56'; Saldanha 83' (pen.) | Report | Teodorović (yellow card) 81'; Damjanović (yellow card) 83' | Stadium: Partizan Stadium; Attendance: 2,500; Referee: (Serbia) Ivan Stamenković |

| 6 November 2023 14 | Novi Pazar | 0–1 | Partizan | Novi Pazar |
| 15:00 | Karaklajić (yellow card) 22'; Mirković (yellow card) 25'; Soumah (yellow card) 71' | Report | Severina 2'; Belić (yellow card) 70'; Stevanović (red card) 90' | Stadium: Novi Pazar City Stadium; Attendance: 0 Referee: (Serbia) Miloš Milanović |

| 12 November 2023 15 | Partizan | 2–1 | Čukarički | Belgrade |
| 19:00 | Saldanha 21' (yellow card) 65'; Ilić 90+6' (yellow card) 25'; Filipović (yellow card) 46'; Nikolić (yellow card) 68'; Šćekić (yellow card) 70' | Report | Vranješ (yellow card) 40'; Stanković (yellow card) 52'; Sissoko (yellow card) 55'; Miladinović 84' (yellow card) 86'; Nikčević (yellow card) 90+2' | Stadium: Partizan Stadium; Attendance: 5,000; Referee: (Serbia) Danilo Nikolić |

| 25 November 2023 16 | Partizan | 0–4 | TSC | Belgrade |
| 18:30 | Kalulu (yellow card) 18'; Filipović (yellow card) 23'; Marković (yellow card) 49'; Šćekić (yellow card) 78'; Ilić (yellow card) 88' | Report | Ćirković 3'; Stojić 11' (yellow card) 78'; Radin 32' (yellow card) 36'; Milovanović 49' | Stadium: Partizan Stadium; Referee: (Serbia) Pavle Ilić |

| 2 December 2023 17 | Partizan | 3–1 | Vojvodina | Belgrade |
| 15:30 | Kanouté (yellow card) 21' (goal) 56'; Natkho (yellow card) 32'; Saldanha 90+7' (pen.) (yellow card) 40'; Belić (yellow card) 84'; Zahid 88'; Jovanović (yellow card) 89' | Report | Nikolić 67'; Milosavljević (yellow card) 78'; Crnomarković (yellow card) 90+4' | Stadium: Partizan Stadium; Attendance: 2,380; Referee: (Serbia) Miloš Milanović |

| 11 December 2023 18 | Radnički Niš | 2–1 | Partizan | Niš |
| 16:00 | Vojnović (yellow card) 44'; Petrov 66' (pen.) (yellow card) 70'; Ilić 73' (o.g.); Ivelja (yellow card) 88'; Jovanović (yellow card) 90+2' | Report | Ilić (yellow card) 20'; Stojković (yellow card) 43'; Saldanha 53'; Saničanin (yellow card) 64' | Stadium: Čair Stadium; Attendance: 4,500; Referee: (Serbia) Marko Ivković |

| 16 December 2023 19 | Partizan | 3–3 | Radnički 1923 | Belgrade |
| 18:30 | Saldanha 39'; Natkho 45'; Belić 87'; Nikolić (yellow card) 90+2' | Report | Gluščević 7' (yellow card) 74'; Chinedu 16'; Mitrović (yellow card) 43'; Bevis (yellow card) 45+1'; Vidakov 73'; Ristić (yellow card) 84'; Vidović (yellow card) 90'; Anthony (yellow card) 90+2' | Stadium: Partizan Stadium; Referee: (Serbia) Predrag Janjuš |

| 10 February 2024 20 | Javor Ivanjica | 0–1 | Partizan | Ivanjica |
| 14:00 | Kopitović (yellow card) 21'; Doucouré (yellow card) 29'; Pinto (yellow card) 39'; Milošević (yellow card) 54'; Ratković (yellow card) 70' | Report | Natkho (yellow card) 26'; Owusu (yellow card) 26'; Antić (yellow card) 48' (yellow-red card) 77'; Saldanha 62' | Stadium: Javor Stadium; Attendance: 2,500; Referee: (Serbia) Milan Ilić |

| 17 February 2024 21 | Partizan | 5–2 | IMT | Belgrade |
| 16:15 | Severina 24'; Kovačević 45+1'; Nikolić (yellow card) 53'; Zahid 67' (pen.); Filipović (yellow card) 80'; Castillo 86'; Goh 90' | Report | Marković 48' (o.g.); Radočaj (yellow card) 73' (yellow-red card) 77'; Luković 81' (pen.) | Stadium: Partizan Stadium; Attendance: 2,700; Referee: (Serbia) Andrija Stojanović |

| 24 February 2024 22 | Radnik Surdulica | 1–2 | Partizan | Surdulica |
| 13:45 | Abubakar (yellow card) 82'; Milićević (yellow card) 90+4'; Šovšić 90+5' (pen.); Jovanović (yellow card) 90+7'; Čumić (yellow card) 90+8' | Report | Marković 69'; Kovačević (yellow card) 74'; Jovanović (yellow card) 76'; Baždar 90+2' (yellow card) 90+2' | Stadium: Surdulica City Stadium; Referee: (Serbia) Miloš Milanović |

| 2 March 2024 23 | Partizan | 3–1 | Železničar Pančevo | Belgrade |
| 18:30 | Baždar 8'; Natkho 30', 35' (pen.); Severina (yellow card) 72'; Trifunović (yellow card) 87' | Report | Hajdin 21' | Stadium: Partizan Stadium; Attendance: 6,000; Referee: (Serbia) Danilo Nikolić |

| 9 March 2024 24 | Red Star Belgrade | 2–2 | Partizan | Belgrade |
| 17:00 | Spajić 45'; Kanga (yellow card) 53'; Ndiaye 69'; In-beom (yellow card) 73' | Report | Kalulu (yellow card) 23' (goal) 51'; Saldanha 45+1' (yellow card) 65'; Severina (yellow card) 69' (yellow-red card) 75'; Jovanović (yellow card) 90'; Natkho (yellow card) 90' | Stadium: Rajko Mitić Stadium; Attendance: 49,100; Referee: (Serbia) Pavle Ilić |

| 13 March 2024 25 | Partizan | 0–1 | Napredak Kruševac | Belgrade |
| 16:55 | | Report | Majdevac 33'; Blagojević (yellow card) 35'; Savić (yellow card) 68'; Zličić (yellow card) 75'; Marinković (yellow card) 88' | Stadium: Partizan Stadium; Referee: (Serbia) Nikola Radaković |

| 17 March 2024 26 | Mladost Lučani | 1–1 | Partizan | Lučani |
| 13:30 | Bojić 44' | Report | Nikolić 85' | Stadium: Stadion FK Mladost; Referee: (Serbia) Predrag Janjuš |

| 30 March 2024 27 | Partizan | 1–0 | Spartak Subotica | Belgrade |
| 18:30 | Baždar 22' | Report | Ubiparip (yellow card) 37'; Kerkez (yellow card) 39'; Lukić (yellow card) 57'; Tomović (yellow card) 90+4' | Stadium: Partizan Stadium; Attendance: 2,000; Referee: (Serbia) Stanko Ostraćanin |

| 3 April 2024 28 | Voždovac | 2–3 | Partizan | Belgrade |
| 16:55 | Matić (yellow card) 9'; Đuričić (yellow card) 45'; Nešković 57' (pen.); Flemmings 81'; Katić (yellow card) 90+4'; Lukić (yellow card) 90+4' | Report | Baždar 40'; Filipović 75'; Zahid (yellow card) 82'; Stojković 90+2' | Stadium: Voždovac Stadium; Attendance: 1,100; Referee: (Serbia) Novak Simović |

| 7 April 2024 29 | Partizan | 2–0 | Novi Pazar | Belgrade |
| 20:00 | Severina 35'; Castillo 56'; Baždar (yellow card) 65'; Janković (yellow card) 90' | Report | Fayed (yellow card) 45+1'; Floro (yellow card) 54'; Jin-ho (yellow card) 77' | Stadium: Partizan Stadium; Attendance: 3,500; Referee: (Serbia) Lazar Lukić |

| 14 April 2024 30 | Čukarički | 3–2 | Partizan | Belgrade |
| 19:15 | Docić (yellow card) 25'; Mello 29'; Ivanović (yellow card) 45+6' (goal) 51'; Nikčević (yellow card) 73' (goal) 90+4' | Report | Antić (yellow card) 46'; Severina 90'; Baždar 90+2' | Stadium: Čukarički Stadium; Attendance: 2,200; Referee: (Serbia) Milan Ilić |

==== Championship round ====
| Pos | Team | Pld | W | D | L | GF | GA | GD | Pts | Qualification | RSB | PAR | TSC | VOJ | RDK | CUK | MLA | NAP |
|---|---|---|---|---|---|---|---|---|---|---|---|---|---|---|---|---|---|---|
| 1 | Red Star Belgrade (C) | 37 | 31 | 3 | 3 | 94 | 28 | +66 | 96 | Qualification for the Champions League play-off round | | 3–2 | 2–1 | | 3–2 | 4–1 | | |
| 2 | Partizan | 37 | 24 | 6 | 7 | 80 | 48 | +32 | 78 | Qualification for the Champions League second qualifying round | | | 1–2 | 2–3 | 2–2 | | 3–0 | |
| 3 | TSC | 37 | 22 | 9 | 6 | 75 | 39 | +36 | 75 | Qualification for the Europa League play-off round (Note: The winner of the 2023–24 Serbian Cup, Red Star Belgrade, has already qualified for 2024–25 UEFA Champions League, so the berth is awarded to third place TSC.) | | | | 3–2 | 4–3 | 2–0 | | 6–0 |
| 4 | Vojvodina | 37 | 17 | 10 | 10 | 62 | 50 | +12 | 61 | Qualification for the Europa League second qualifying round | 0–0 | | | | | 2–3 | 1–0 | 5–0 |
| 5 | Radnički 1923 | 37 | 19 | 4 | 14 | 64 | 61 | +3 | 61 | Qualification for the Conference League second qualifying round | | | | 0–0 | | 4–3 | 3–2 | |

Source: SuperLiga (in Serbian)
Legend: Blue = home team win; Yellow = draw; Red = away team win.
Rules for classification: 1) Points; 2) Points in regular season; 3) Head-to-head points in regular season; 4) Head-to-head goal difference in regular season; 5) Head-to-head goals scored in regular season; 6) Head-to-head away goals scored in regular season (if two teams tied); 7) Goal difference; 8) Goals scored; 9) Fair play ranking; 10) Drawing of lots.
(C) Champions

===== Results by matchday =====
| Round | 1 | 2 | 3 | 4 | 5 | 6 | 7 |
|---|---|---|---|---|---|---|---|
| Ground | A | H | H | A | H | A | H |
| Result | L | L | L | D | W | W | D |
| Position | 2 | 2 | 2 | 2 | 2 | 2 | 2 |

Updated to match(es) played on 25 May 2024. Source: Partizan
A = Away; H = Home; W = Win; D = Draw; L = Loss

| 20 April 2024 31 | Red Star Belgrade | 3–2 | Partizan | Belgrade |
| 18:00 | Kanga 16' (pen.); Ndiaye 90'; Katai 90+9' (pen.); Krasso (yellow card) 90+12'; Glazer (yellow card) 90+19' | Report | Baždar 11'; Owusu (yellow card) 40'; Severina 57'; Kovačević (yellow card) 82'; Kalulu (yellow card) 90+1'; Marković (yellow card) 90+7' | Stadium: Red Star Stadium; Referee: (Serbia) Pavle Ilić |

| 28 April 2024 32 | Partizan | 1–2 | TSC | Belgrade |
| 19:30 | Natcho 35'; Kovačević (yellow card) 66'; Castillo (yellow card) 90' | Report | Ćirković 32'; Stojić (yellow card) 33'; Radin (yellow card) 59'; Jovanović 77'; Jorgić (red card) 81'; Cvetković (yellow card) 82' | Stadium: Partizan Stadium; Attendance: 1,000; Referee: (Serbia) Nenad Minaković |

| 2 May 2024 33 | Partizan | 2–3 | Vojvodina | Belgrade |
| 16:55 | Crnomarković 19' (o.g.); Saldanha (yellow card) 46'; Stojković 58'; Owusu (yellow card) 90+1' | Report | Korać (yellow card) 9'; Sery (yellow card) 23' (goal) 38'; Zukić 44'; Ivanović (yellow card) 86'; Petrović 90+4' | Stadium: Partizan Stadium; Attendance: 2,000; Referee: (Serbia) Srđan Jovanović |

| 8 May 2024 34 | Napredak Kruševac | 3–3 | Partizan | Kruševac |
| 16:00 | Majdevac 19', 51'; Bastajić 26'; Marinković (yellow card) 90'; Savić (yellow card) 90+6' | Report | Filipović 7' (yellow card) 40'; Janković 80'; Severina (yellow card) 82'; Stevanović 90' (o.g.) | Stadium: Mladost Stadium; Attendance: 3,500; Referee: (Serbia) Stanko Ostraćanin |

| 12 May 2024 35 | Partizan | 3–0 | Mladost Lučani | Belgrade |
| 16:30 | Natcho 41'; Saldanha 86'; Baždar 90+3' | Report | Pejović (yellow card) 60' | Stadium: Partizan Stadium; Attendance: 700; Referee: (Serbia) Predrag Janjuš |

| 17 May 2024 36 | Čukarički | 0–1 | Partizan | Belgrade |
| 18:30 | Stanković (yellow card) 29'; Miladinović (yellow card) 57'; Docić (yellow card) 57' (red card) 90+5'; Jovanović (yellow card) 90+5' (yellow-red card) 90+7'; Stevanović (yellow card) 90+6' | Report | Saldanha (yellow card) 19'; Severina 55'; Šćekić (yellow card) 90+3'; Baždar (yellow card) 90+6' | Stadium: Čukarički Stadium; Attendance: 1,100; Referee: (Serbia) Novak Simović |

| 25 May 2024 37 | Partizan | 2–2 | Radnički 1923 | Belgrade |
| 18:00 | Antić (yellow card) 62'; Kovačević (yellow card) 64'; Nikolić 76'; Trifunović 82' | Report | Vidosavljević 6'; Pecelj (yellow card) 68'; Aleksić 72' | Stadium: Partizan Stadium; Attendance: 1,500; Referee: (Serbia) Stefan Jeknić |

=== Serbian Cup ===
| 1 November 2023 Round of 32 | Jedinstvo Ub | 0–1 | Partizan | Ub |
| 13:00 | Andrić (yellow card) 35'; Bogdanović (yellow card) 43' | Report | Severina (yellow card) 44'; Nikolić 54'; Saldanha (yellow card) 90'; Šehović (yellow card) 90+2' | Stadium: Dragan Džajić Stadium; Attendance: 2,500; Referee: (Serbia) Danilo Nikolić |

| 7 December 2023 Round of 16 | Partizan | 1–1 (5–4 p) | Grafičar Beograd | Belgrade |
| 16:00 | Jovanović 79' | Report | Mboup (yellow card) 25' (yellow-red card) 66'; Ajdar 64'; Mijatović (yellow card) 90' | Stadium: Partizan Stadium; Attendance: 500; Referee: (Serbia) Andrija Stojanović |
| | Penalties |
| | Natcho (penalty scored); Belić (penalty scored); Kalulu (penalty scored); Zahid (penalty scored); Saldanha (penalty scored) | | Petrović (penalty scored); Jovanović (penalty scored); Fratrović (penalty missed); Vukičević (penalty scored); Đukić (penalty scored) |

| 10 April 2024 Quarter-final | Partizan | 1–1 (4–3 p) | Voždovac | Belgrade |
| 15:00 | Baždar 45+3'; Nikolić (yellow card) 66' | Report | Lukić (yellow card) 60'; Krpić (yellow card) 86'; Pirgić 89'; Flemmings (yellow card) 90+5' | Stadium: Partizan Stadium; Attendance: 2,000; Referee: (Serbia) Milan Stefanović |
| | Penalties |
| | Janković (penalty scored); Nikolić (penalty scored); Antić (penalty scored); Zahid (penalty scored) | | Nešković (penalty missed); Đurđević (penalty scored); Petrović (penalty scored); Flemmings (penalty scored); Pirgić (penalty missed) |

| 24 April 2024 Semifinal | Red Star Belgrade | 2–0 | Partizan | Belgrade |
| 19:00 | Filipović 29' (o.g.); Olayinka 30' (yellow card) 77'; Stamenić (yellow card) 45' | Report | Marković (yellow card) 1'; Baždar (yellow card) 41'; Filipović (yellow card) 86' | Stadium: Red Star Stadium; Attendance: 25,000; Referee: (Serbia) Miloš Milanović |

=== UEFA Europa Conference League ===
==== Third qualifying round ====
| 10 August 2023 Third qualifying round | Sabah FC (Azerbaijan) | 2–0 | (Serbia) Partizan | Baku, Azerbaijan |
| 18:00 | Christian (yellow card) 50'; Apeh (yellow card) 51'; Letić 70'; Isayev 74' (yellow card) 90+7' | Report | Belić (yellow card) 4' | Stadium: Bank Respublika Arena; Attendance: 6,000; Referee: (Georgia (country)) Giorgi Kruashvili |

| 17 August 2023 Third qualifying round | Partizan (Serbia) | 2–0 (2–2 agg.) | (Azerbaijan) Sabah FC | Belgrade, Serbia |
| 21:00 | Saldanha 30'; Natcho 58' (yellow card) 116'; Šćekić (yellow card) 83'; Belić (yellow card) 107' (yellow-red card) 116' | Report | Letić (yellow card) 8'; Hadhoudi (yellow card) 26'; Chakla (yellow card) 57'; İmanov (yellow card) 87'; Christian (yellow card) 90+8' | Stadium: Partizan Stadium; Attendance: 14,225; Referee: (Poland) Bartosz Frankowski |
| | Penalties |
| | Pavlović (penalty scored); Nikolić (penalty scored); Kalulu (penalty scored); Antić (penalty scored); Baždar (penalty scored) | | Isayev (penalty scored); Apeh (penalty scored); Nuriyev (penalty scored); Christian (penalty scored); Ələsgərov (penalty missed) |

==== Play-off round ====
| 24 August 2023 Play-off round | Nordsjælland (Denmark) | 5–0 | (Serbia) Partizan | Farum, Denmark |
| 18:30 | Frese 11'; Ingvartsen 43' (pen.), 68' (pen.); Villadsen 73'; Ilić 88' (o.g.) | Report | Jovanović (yellow card) 44'; Šćekić (yellow card) 67'; Baždar (yellow card) 90+1'; Antić (yellow card) 90+3' | Stadium: Right to Dream Park; Attendance: 4,120; Referee: (Israel) Yigal Frid |

| 31 August 2023 Play-off round | Partizan (Serbia) | 0–1 (0–6 agg.) | (Denmark) Nordsjælland | Belgrade, Serbia |
| 21:00 | Kanouté (yellow card) 21'; Saldanha (yellow card) 24'; Nikolić (yellow card) 76' (yellow-red card) 83' | Report | Osman 30'; Frese (yellow card) 73' | Stadium: Partizan Stadium; Attendance: 2,916; Referee: (Scotland) Kevin Clancy |

== Statistics ==
=== Squad statistics ===
| No. | Pos | Nat | Player | Total | | SuperLiga | | Cup | | Europe | |
| No. | Pos | Nat | Player | Apps | Goals | Apps | Goals | Apps | Goals | Apps | Goals |
Goalkeepers
| 1 | GK | (Serbia) SRB | Aleksandar Jovanović | 41 | 0 | 34 | 0 | 3 | 0 | 4 | 0 |
| 33 | GK | (Serbia) SRB | Miloš Krunić | 3 | 0 | 3 | 0 | 0 | 0 | 0 | 0 |
| 41 | GK | (Serbia) SRB | Vanja Radulaški | 0 | 0 | 0 | 0 | 0 | 0 | 0 | 0 |
| 85 | GK | (Serbia) SRB | Nemanja Stevanović | 2 | 0 | 1 | 0 | 1 | 0 | 0 | 0 |
Defenders
| 2 | DF | (Serbia) SRB | Aranđel Stojković | 42 | 3 | 35 | 3 | 3 | 0 | 4 | 0 |
| 4 | DF | (Bosnia and Herzegovina) BIH | Siniša Saničanin | 10 | 0 | 8 | 0 | 2 | 0 | 0 | 0 |
| 5 | DF | (Serbia) SRB | Nikola Antić | 42 | 0 | 36 | 0 | 2 | 0 | 4 | 0 |
| 6 | DF | (Serbia) SRB | Svetozar Marković | 33 | 2 | 26 | 2 | 3 | 0 | 4 | 0 |
| 17 | DF | (Serbia) SRB | Marko Živković | 1 | 0 | 1 | 0 | 0 | 0 | 0 | 0 |
| 25 | DF | (Belgium) BEL | Nathan de Medina | 2 | 0 | 0 | 0 | 2 | 0 | 0 | 0 |
| 26 | DF | (Serbia) SRB | Aleksandar Filipović | 25 | 2 | 20 | 2 | 4 | 0 | 1 | 0 |
| 30 | DF | (Montenegro) MNE | Milan Roganović | 1 | 0 | 1 | 0 | 0 | 0 | 0 | 0 |
| 36 | DF | (Serbia) SRB | Bojan Kovačević | 16 | 1 | 15 | 1 | 1 | 0 | 0 | 0 |
| 40 | DF | (Serbia) SRB | Nikola Miličić | 0 | 0 | 0 | 0 | 0 | 0 | 0 | 0 |
Midfielders
| 8 | MF | (Senegal) SEN | Franck Kanouté | 22 | 1 | 18 | 1 | 0 | 0 | 4 | 0 |
| 10 | MF | (Israel) ISR | Bibras Natkho | 42 | 12 | 34 | 11 | 4 | 0 | 4 | 1 |
| 16 | MF | (Ghana) GHA | Leonard Owusu | 20 | 0 | 18 | 0 | 2 | 0 | 0 | 0 |
| 18 | MF | (Serbia) SRB | Ognjen Ugrešić | 0 | 0 | 0 | 0 | 0 | 0 | 0 | 0 |
| 19 | MF | (Montenegro) MNE | Aleksandar Šćekić | 23 | 0 | 16 | 0 | 3 | 0 | 4 | 0 |
| 21 | MF | (Ecuador) ECU | Denil Castillo | 15 | 2 | 14 | 2 | 1 | 0 | 0 | 0 |
| 29 | MF | (Norway) NOR | Ghayas Zahid | 38 | 7 | 33 | 7 | 4 | 0 | 1 | 0 |
| 45 | MF | (Serbia) SRB | Mateja Stjepanović | 8 | 0 | 8 | 0 | 0 | 0 | 0 | 0 |
| 55 | MF | (Serbia) SRB | Danilo Pantić | 3 | 0 | 2 | 0 | 0 | 0 | 1 | 0 |
| 77 | MF | (South Korea) KOR | Goh Young-jun | 19 | 1 | 17 | 1 | 2 | 0 | 0 | 0 |
Forwards
| 7 | FW | (Curaçao) CUW | Xander Severina | 37 | 8 | 30 | 8 | 3 | 0 | 4 | 0 |
| 11 | FW | (Brazil) BRA | Matheus Saldanha | 34 | 18 | 27 | 17 | 3 | 0 | 4 | 1 |
| 14 | FW | (Serbia) SRB | Samed Baždar | 31 | 8 | 25 | 7 | 4 | 1 | 2 | 0 |
| 15 | FW | (Democratic Republic of the Congo) COD | Aldo Kalulu | 41 | 3 | 34 | 3 | 3 | 0 | 4 | 0 |
| 20 | FW | (Serbia) SRB | Andrija Pavlović | 1 | 0 | 0 | 0 | 0 | 0 | 1 | 0 |
| 23 | FW | (Serbia) SRB | Nemanja Nikolić | 38 | 6 | 31 | 5 | 3 | 1 | 4 | 0 |
| 42 | FW | (Serbia) SRB | Dušan Jovanović | 2 | 1 | 1 | 0 | 1 | 1 | 0 | 0 |
| 43 | FW | (Serbia) SRB | Nemanja Trifunović | 18 | 1 | 14 | 1 | 2 | 0 | 2 | 0 |
| 44 | FW | (Serbia) SRB | Bogdan Mirčetić | 0 | 0 | 0 | 0 | 0 | 0 | 0 | 0 |
| 99 | FW | (Serbia) SRB | Aleksa Janković | 10 | 1 | 8 | 1 | 2 | 0 | 0 | 0 |
Players transferred out during the season
| 3 | DF | (Serbia) SRB | Mihajlo Ilić | 22 | 1 | 18 | 1 | 0 | 0 | 4 | 0 |
| 9 | FW | (Netherlands) NED | Queensy Menig | 21 | 2 | 15 | 2 | 2 | 0 | 4 | 0 |
| 12 | DF | (Serbia) SRB | Zlatan Šehović | 4 | 0 | 2 | 0 | 2 | 0 | 0 | 0 |
| 30 | FW | (Serbia) SRB | Milan Aleksić | 0 | 0 | 0 | 0 | 0 | 0 | 0 | 0 |
| 36 | FW | (Serbia) SRB | Nikola Terzić | 0 | 0 | 0 | 0 | 0 | 0 | 0 | 0 |
| 38 | FW | (Serbia) SRB | Janko Jevremović | 0 | 0 | 0 | 0 | 0 | 0 | 0 | 0 |
| 40 | MF | (Serbia) SRB | Kristijan Belić | 23 | 2 | 18 | 2 | 2 | 0 | 3 | 0 |
| 90 | FW | (Serbia) SRB | Mihajlo Petković | 0 | 0 | 0 | 0 | 0 | 0 | 0 | 0 |

Last updated: 25 May 2024
Source: Competitions

=== Goal scorers ===
| Rank | No. | Pos | Nat | Name | SuperLiga | Serbian Cup | Europe | Total |
|---|---|---|---|---|---|---|---|---|
| 1 | 11 | FW | (Brazil) | Matheus Saldanha | 17 | 0 | 1 | 18 |
| 2 | 10 | MF | (Israel) | Bibras Natkho | 11 | 0 | 1 | 12 |
| 3 | 14 | FW | (Serbia) | Samed Baždar | 7 | 1 | 0 | 8 |
| 3 | 7 | FW | (Curaçao) | Xander Severina | 8 | 0 | 0 | 8 |
| 4 | 29 | MF | (Norway) | Ghayas Zahid | 7 | 0 | 0 | 7 |
| 5 | 23 | FW | (Serbia) | Nemanja Nikolić | 5 | 1 | 0 | 6 |
| 6 | 15 | FW | (Democratic Republic of the Congo) | Aldo Kalulu | 3 | 0 | 0 | 3 |
| 6 | 2 | DF | (Serbia) | Aranđel Stojković | 3 | 0 | 0 | 3 |
| 6 | | | | Own goal | 3 | 0 | 0 | 3 |
| 7 | 9 | FW | (Netherlands) | Queensy Menig | 2 | 0 | 0 | 2 |
| 7 | 40 | MF | (Serbia) | Kristijan Belić | 2 | 0 | 0 | 2 |
| 7 | 2 | DF | (Serbia) | Svetozar Marković | 2 | 0 | 0 | 2 |
| 7 | 21 | MF | (Ecuador) | Denil Castillo | 2 | 0 | 0 | 2 |
| 7 | 26 | DF | (Serbia) | Aleksandar Filipović | 2 | 0 | 0 | 2 |
| 8 | 3 | DF | (Serbia) | Mihajlo Ilić | 1 | 0 | 0 | 1 |
| 8 | 8 | MF | (Senegal) | Franck Kanouté | 1 | 0 | 0 | 1 |
| 8 | 42 | FW | (Serbia) | Dušan Jovanović | 0 | 1 | 0 | 1 |
| 8 | 36 | DF | (Serbia) | Bojan Kovačević | 1 | 0 | 0 | 1 |
| 8 | 21 | MF | (South Korea) | Goh Young-jun | 1 | 0 | 0 | 1 |
| 8 | 99 | FW | (Serbia) | Aleksa Janković | 1 | 0 | 0 | 1 |
| 8 | 43 | FW | (Serbia) | Nemanja Trifunović | 1 | 0 | 0 | 1 |
| Totals | | | | | 80 | 3 | 2 | 85 |

Last updated: 25 May 2024

=== Clean sheets ===
| Rank | No. | Pos | Nat | Name | SuperLiga | Serbian Cup | Europe | Total |
|---|---|---|---|---|---|---|---|---|
| 1 | 1 | GK | (Serbia) | Aleksandar Jovanović | 12 | 0 | 1 | 13 |
| 2 | 85 | GK | (Serbia) | Nemanja Stevanović | 0 | 1 | 0 | 1 |
| Totals | | | | | 12 | 1 | 1 | 14 |

Last updated: 25 May 2024

=== Disciplinary record ===
| Number | Nation | Position | Name | SuperLiga | | Serbian Cup | | Europe | | Total | |
| Number | Nation | Position | Name | Booked | Sent off (straight red) | Booked | Sent off (straight red) | Booked | Sent off (straight red) | Booked | Sent off (straight red) |
| 1 | (Serbia) | GK | Aleksandar Jovanović | 5 | 0 | 0 | 0 | 1 | 0 | 6 | 0 |
| 2 | (Serbia) | DF | Aranđel Stojković | 1 | 0 | 0 | 0 | 0 | 0 | 1 | 0 |
| 3 | (Serbia) | DF | Mihajlo Ilić | 4 | 0 | 0 | 0 | 0 | 0 | 4 | 0 |
| 4 | (Bosnia and Herzegovina) | DF | Siniša Saničanin | 1 | 0 | 0 | 0 | 0 | 0 | 1 | 0 |
| 5 | (Serbia) | DF | Nikola Antić | 4 | 1 | 0 | 0 | 1 | 0 | 5 | 1 |
| 6 | (Serbia) | DF | Svetozar Marković | 2 | 0 | 1 | 0 | 0 | 0 | 3 | 0 |
| 7 | (Curaçao) | FW | Xander Severina | 4 | 1 | 1 | 0 | 0 | 0 | 4 | 1 |
| 8 | (Senegal) | MF | Franck Kanouté | 5 | 0 | 0 | 0 | 0 | 0 | 5 | 0 |
| 9 | (Netherlands) | FW | Queensy Menig | 1 | 0 | 0 | 0 | 0 | 0 | 1 | 0 |
| 10 | (Israel) | MF | Bibras Natkho | 5 | 0 | 0 | 0 | 1 | 0 | 6 | 0 |
| 11 | (Brazil) | FW | Matheus Saldanha | 9 | 0 | 1 | 0 | 0 | 0 | 10 | 0 |
| 12 | (Serbia) | DF | Zlatan Šehović | 0 | 0 | 1 | 0 | 0 | 0 | 1 | 0 |
| 14 | (Serbia) | FW | Samed Baždar | 3 | 0 | 1 | 0 | 1 | 0 | 5 | 0 |
| 16 | (Ghana) | MF | Leonard Owusu | 3 | 0 | 0 | 0 | 0 | 0 | 3 | 0 |
| 15 | (Democratic Republic of the Congo) | FW | Aldo Kalulu | 5 | 1 | 0 | 0 | 0 | 0 | 5 | 1 |
| 19 | (Montenegro) | MF | Aleksandar Šćekić | 5 | 1 | 0 | 0 | 2 | 0 | 7 | 1 |
| 21 | (Ecuador) | MF | Denil Castillo | 1 | 0 | 0 | 0 | 0 | 0 | 1 | 0 |
| 23 | (Serbia) | FW | Nemanja Nikolić | 4 | 0 | 1 | 0 | 2 | 1 | 7 | 1 |
| 26 | (Serbia) | DF | Aleksandar Filipović | 4 | 0 | 1 | 0 | 0 | 0 | 5 | 0 |
| 29 | (Norway) | MF | Ghayas Zahid | 1 | 0 | 0 | 0 | 0 | 0 | 1 | 0 |
| 36 | (Serbia) | DF | Bojan Kovačević | 4 | 0 | 0 | 0 | 0 | 0 | 4 | 0 |
| 40 | (Serbia) | MF | Kristijan Belić | 3 | 0 | 0 | 0 | 3 | 1 | 6 | 1 |
| 43 | (Serbia) | FW | Nemanja Trifunović | 1 | 0 | 0 | 0 | 0 | 0 | 1 | 0 |
| 45 | (Serbia) | MF | Mateja Stjepanović | 1 | 0 | 0 | 0 | 0 | 0 | 1 | 0 |
| 55 | (Serbia) | MF | Danilo Pantić | 1 | 0 | 0 | 0 | 0 | 0 | 1 | 0 |
| 85 | (Serbia) | GK | Nemanja Stevanović | 0 | 1 | 0 | 0 | 0 | 0 | 0 | 1 |
| 99 | (Serbia) | FW | Aleksa Janković | 1 | 0 | 0 | 0 | 0 | 0 | 1 | 0 |
| | | | TOTALS | 77 | 1 | 7 | 0 | 11 | 2 | 95 | 7 |

Last updated: 25 May 2024

=== Game as captain ===
| Rank | No. | Pos | Nat | Name | SuperLiga | Serbian Cup | Europe | Total |
|---|---|---|---|---|---|---|---|---|
| 1 | 6 | DF | (Serbia) | Svetozar Marković | 27 | 2 | 4 | 33 |
| 2 | 10 | MF | (Israel) | Bibras Natkho | 9 | 1 | 0 | 10 |
| 3 | 19 | MF | (Montenegro) | Aleksandar Šćekić | 0 | 1 | 0 | 1 |
| 3 | 1 | GK | (Serbia) | Aleksandar Jovanović | 1 | 0 | 0 | 1 |
| Totals | | | | | 37 | 4 | 4 | 45 |

Last updated: 25 May 2024
