= Ghayas Zahid =

Norwegian footballer (born 1994)

Personal information
- Date of birth: 8 September 1994 (age 32)
- Place of birth: Oslo, Norway
- Height: 1.73 m (5 ft 8 in)
- Position: Attacking midfielder

Team information
- Current team: Vålerenga
- Number: 11

Youth career
- –2009: Klemetsrud IF
- 2009–2012: Vålerenga

Senior career*
| Years | Team | Apps | (Gls) |
| 2012–2017 | Vålerenga | 111 | (29) |
| 2013 | → Ull/Kisa (loan) | 10 | (0) |
| 2017–2021 | APOEL | 94 | (16) |
| 2019–2020 | → Panathinaikos (loan) | 25 | (4) |
| 2021–2023 | Ankaragücü | 57 | (7) |
| 2023–2026 | Partizan | 57 | (8) |
| 2026– | Vålerenga | 9 | (0) |

International career
| 2013 | Norway U19 | 4 | (0) |
| 2014–2016 | Norway U21 | 19 | (3) |
| 2018–2020 | Norway | 2 | (1) |
- * Club domestic league appearances and goals as of 1 November 2026

Ghayas Zahid (born 8 September 1994) is a Norwegian professional footballer who plays as an attacking midfielder for Vålerenga.

== Club career ==
=== Early years ===
Zahid was born in Oslo to Pakistani parents. He played for Klemetsrud IF before he joined Vålerenga as a youth. Zahid made his debut for Vålerenga on 10 August 2012, in a 3–1 win against Odd.

==== Ullensaker/Kisa (loan) ====
Zahid was loaned out to Adeccoligaen club Ullensaker/Kisa for the second half of the 2013 season. He made 10 appearances during his loan spell.

=== APOEL ===
On 31 August 2017, it was announced that APOEL had secured Zahid's signature on a four-year contract until the end of May 2021, for an undisclosed transfer fee from Vålerenga. Zahid made his debut in the third round of the Cypriot First Division against Nea Salamis. Ghayas Zahid debuted in the 2017–18 UEFA Champions League for APOEL at Santiago Bernabéu where they lost 3–0 against last campaign's champions, Real Madrid. Following the match, Zahid became the first footballer of Pakistani descent to feature in the Champions League. Zahid was in the starting line-up and played full 90 minutes for the remaining five games in Group H against Tottenham Hotspur, Borussia Dortmund as well as the second leg against Real Madrid. On 17 November Zahid scored twice in the Nicosia derby in a 3–1 win against arch rivals Omonia.

==== Panathinaikos (loan) ====
On 23 July 2019, Panathinaikos announced the arrival of Zahid on loan from APOEL, with a purchase option of €1.6 million for the summer of 2020. The option was not triggered, and at the end of the season, he also left APOEL as his contract expired.

=== Ankaragücü ===
On 8 September 2021, Zahid signed a one-year contract with TFF 1. Lig club Ankaragücü, with an option for an additional year if the club wins promotion to the Süper Lig. He made his debut four days later, on 12 September, coming on as a substitute in the 61st minute for Abdullah Durak in a 2–0 win over Gençlerbirliği. After 9 goals and 7 assists in 64 official matches, Zahid left the Turkish club at the end of the 2022–23 season.

=== Partizan ===
On 23 August 2023, Zahid signed a three-year deal with a Serbian club Partizan. He made his debut against Javor Ivanjica on 27 August, then scored his first goal in a 3–2 win over Radnik Surdulica. Zahid scored the winning goal in the 82nd minute for a 2–1 victory against Železničar Pančevo. Zahid was declared the most valuable player of the Serbian SuperLiga in October, scoring three goals against Mladost Lučani, Spartak Subotica and Voždovac. Zahid recorded two assists in the 2–1 win over Čukarički in the 21st minute for Saldanha's 10th goal of the season and the 96th minute for Mihajlo Ilić's winning goal. In the derby of the 17th round of the Serbian SuperLiga, Partizan defeated Vojvodina 3–1. The decisive goal was scored by Zahid in the 87th minute, when he broke the deadlock. On 20 December 2023 in the 171st Eternal Derby he provided the assist for Saldanha's winning goal in a 2–1 Partizan win.

== International career ==
Zahid represented Norway at youth level. In an interview with Aftenposten in July 2014, and in another discussion in 2017 after playing in the Champions League, Zahid had declared his intention to play for Pakistan. In 2018, Zahid also cited his intention to play at the highest level at Norway with Pakistan as a backup choice. In March 2018, the Pakistan Football Federation contacted Zahid's former club Valerenga, only to be told that he had since left for APOEL. Zahid's father also preferred him to play for his country of origin, if the Pakistani passport was issued in due course.

Zahid eventually opted for Norway after being called up for a friendly against Panama. On 6 June 2018, Zahid made his first appearance for Norway against Panama as a substitute in the 89th minute. He scored a goal on his second appearance against Austria in a 1–1 draw during the 2020–21 UEFA Nations League B.

== Personal life ==
Zahid's family originate from the city of Lalamusa in Pakistan. He is fluent in Norwegian and Urdu. He is the first footballer of Pakistani descent to feature in the UEFA Champions League, after playing against Real Madrid in 2017.

== Career statistics ==
=== Club ===
As of 1 November 2026

Appearances and goals by club, season and competition
| Club | Season | League | | | Cup | | Europe | | Other | | Total | |
| Club | Season | Division | Apps | Goals | Apps | Goals | Apps | Goals | Apps | Goals | Apps | Goals |
|---|---|---|---|---|---|---|---|---|---|---|---|---|
| Vålerenga | 2012 | Eliteserien | 4 | 0 | 0 | 0 | — | | — | | 4 | 0 |
| Vålerenga | 2013 | Eliteserien | 3 | 0 | 2 | 1 | — | | — | | 5 | 1 |
| Vålerenga | 2014 | Eliteserien | 29 | 9 | 4 | 0 | — | | — | | 33 | 9 |
| Vålerenga | 2015 | Eliteserien | 29 | 7 | 2 | 0 | — | | — | | 31 | 7 |
| Vålerenga | 2016 | Eliteserien | 28 | 8 | 4 | 1 | — | | — | | 32 | 9 |
| Vålerenga | 2017 | Eliteserien | 18 | 5 | 4 | 3 | — | | — | | 22 | 8 |
| Vålerenga | Total | | 111 | 29 | 16 | 5 | — | | — | | 127 | 34 |
| Ull/Kisa (loan) | 2013 | 1. divisjon | 10 | 0 | — | | — | | — | | 10 | 0 |
| APOEL | 2017–18 | Cypriot First Division | 33 | 10 | 2 | 0 | 6 | 0 | — | | 41 | 10 |
| APOEL | 2018–19 | Cypriot First Division | 27 | 3 | 5 | 1 | 5 | 0 | 0 | 0 | 37 | 4 |
| APOEL | 2020–21 | Cypriot First Division | 34 | 3 | 6 | 1 | 4 | 0 | 0 | 0 | 44 | 4 |
| APOEL | Total | | 94 | 16 | 13 | 2 | 15 | 0 | 0 | 0 | 122 | 18 |
| Panathinaikos (loan) | 2019–20 | Super League Greece | 25 | 4 | 4 | 0 | — | | — | | 29 | 4 |
| Ankaragücü | 2021–22 | TFF 1. Lig | 29 | 5 | 2 | 0 | — | | — | | 31 | 5 |
| Ankaragücü | 2022–23 | Süper Lig | 28 | 2 | 5 | 2 | — | | — | | 33 | 4 |
| Ankaragücü | Total | | 57 | 7 | 7 | 2 | — | | — | | 64 | 9 |
| Partizan | 2023–24 | Serbian SuperLiga | 33 | 7 | 4 | 0 | 1 | 0 | — | | 38 | 7 |
| Partizan | 2024–25 | Serbian SuperLiga | 13 | 1 | 1 | 0 | 6 | 1 | — | | 20 | 2 |
| Partizan | 2025–26 | Serbian SuperLiga | 11 | 0 | 1 | 0 | 0 | 0 | — | | 12 | 0 |
| Partizan | Total | | 57 | 8 | 6 | 0 | 7 | 1 | — | | 70 | 9 |
| Vålerenga | 2026 | Eliteserien | 9 | 0 | 2 | 0 | — | | — | | 11 | 0 |
| Career total | | | 363 | 64 | 48 | 9 | 22 | 1 | 0 | 0 | 433 | 74 |

=== International ===
Scores and results list the Norway's goal tally first. Score column indicates score after each Zahid goal.

| No. | Date | Venue | Cap | Opponent | Score | Result | Competition |
|---|---|---|---|---|---|---|---|
| 1 | 18 November 2020 | Ernst-Happel-Stadion, Vienna, Vienna | 2 | Austria | 1–0 | 1–1 | 2020–21 UEFA Nations League B |

== Honours ==
APOEL

- Cypriot First Division: 2017–18, 2018–19

Ankaragücü

- TFF 1. Lig: 2021–22

Individual

- Serbian SuperLiga Player of the Week: 2023–24 (Round 21),
