= Nikola Miličić =

Serbian footballer (born 2004)

Personal information
- Date of birth: 4 July 2004 (age 22)
- Place of birth: Kraljevo, Serbia and Montenegro
- Height: 1.86 m (6 ft 1 in)
- Position: Centre-back

Team information
- Current team: Radnički 1923
- Number: 4

Youth career
- Kiker
- 2021–2022: Radnički 1923

Senior career*
Years	Team	Apps	(Gls)
2022–2024	Radnički 1923	32	(0)
2024–2025	Partizan	0	(0)
2024	→ Napredak Kruševac (loan)	6	(0)
2025	Burgos	0	(0)
2025–	Radnički 1923	23	(0)

International career^{‡}
2022	Serbia U18	1	(0)
2022–2023	Serbia U19	6	(0)
2024–	Serbia U21	4	(0)
- * Club domestic league appearances and goals as of 5 June 2026 ‡ National team caps and goals as of 26 December 2025

Nikola Miličić (Serbian Cyrillic: Никола Миличић; born 4 July 2004) is a Serbian professional footballer who plays as a centre-back for Radnički 1923.

== Club career ==
Born in Kraljevo, Miličić initially played as a midfielder with local side Kiker in the Serbian under 17 competition. Later, in summer 2021 he moved to Radnički 1923. Following his first season with youth squad he joined the first team under coach Dejan Joksimović and made his professional debut in 2022–23 Serbian SuperLiga. Miličić collected 33 caps at all until his injury in September 2023. Several months later, he signed for Partizan as a replacement for Mihajlo Ilić who moved to Bologna.

On 3 February 2025, Miličić signed a two-and-a-half-year contract with Burgos in the Spanish second tier.

== Career statistics ==
As of 20 December 2023

Appearances and goals by club, season and competition
Club	Season	League			National cup		Continental		Other		Total	
Club	Season	Division	Apps	Goals	Apps	Goals	Apps	Goals	Apps	Goals	Apps	Goals
Radnički 1923	2022–23	Serbian SuperLiga	27	0	1	0	—		—		28	0
Radnički 1923	2023–24	Serbian SuperLiga	5	0	0	0	—		—		5	0
Radnički 1923	Total		32	0	1	0	—		—		33	0
Partizan	2023–24	Serbian SuperLiga	0	0	0	0	—		—		0	0
Partizan	Total		0	0	0	0	—		—		0	0
Career total			32	0	1	0	—		—		33	0
