= Miloš Krunić =

Serbian footballer (born 1996)

Personal information
- Full name: Miloš Krunić
- Date of birth: 22 November 1996 (age 29)
- Place of birth: Belgrade, FR Yugoslavia
- Height: 1.98 m (6 ft 6 in)
- Position: Goalkeeper

Team information
- Current team: Partizan
- Number: 31

Youth career
- Zemun

Senior career*
Years	Team	Apps	(Gls)
2013–2020	Zemun	55	(0)
2015–2016	→ Srem Jakovo (loan)	15	(0)
2016	→ Rakovica (loan)	15	(0)
2018	→ Bežanija (loan)	34	(0)
2020–2024	Voždovac	47	(0)
2023	Hajer	2	(0)
2024–	Partizan	13	(0)
- * Club domestic league appearances and goals as of 19 September 2026

Miloš Krunić (Serbian Cyrillic: Милош Крунић; born 22 November 1996) is a Serbian professional footballer who plays as a goalkeeper for Partizan.

== Club career ==
=== Zemun ===
Born in Belgrade, Krunić started his professional career at Zemun, where he spent time from 2013 to 2020. He was later sent on loan to Srem Jakovo, Rakovica and Bežanija.

=== Voždovac ===
In September 2020, after the ending of the contract with Zemun, Krunić moved to Voždovac and signed four-year contract with them.

=== Hajer ===
On 1 July 2023 he moved to Saudi Second Division League and signed a contract with Hajer club where he played two matches and there he spent couple of months.

=== Partizan ===
On 17 January 2024, after terminating his contract with Hajer, he moved back to Serbia where he signed a one-year deal with Partizan.

== Career statistics ==
=== Club ===
As of match played 4 November 2026

Appearances and goals by club, season and competition
Club	Season	League	League		Cup		Continental		Other		Total	
Club	Season	League	Apps	Goals	Apps	Goals	Apps	Goals	Apps	Goals	Apps	Goals
Zemun	2013–14	Serbian League Belgrade	7	0	—		—		—		7	0
Zemun	2014–15	Serbian League Belgrade	10	0	—		—		—		10	0
Zemun	2015–16	Serbian First League	8	0	1	0	—		—		9	0
Zemun	2016–17	Serbian First League	1	0	—		—		—		1	0
Zemun	2017–18	Serbian SuperLiga	0	0	0	0	—		—		0	0
Zemun	2018–19	Serbian SuperLiga	1	0	0	0	—		—		1	0
Zemun	2019–20	Serbian First League	28	0	1	0	—		—		29	0
Zemun	Total		55	0	2	0	—		—		57	0
Srem Jakovo (loan)	2015–16	Serbian League Belgrade	15	0	—		—		—		15	0
Rakovica (loan)	2016–17	Serbian League Belgrade	15	0	—		—		—		15	0
Bežanija (loan)	2017–18	Serbian First League	14	0	—		—		—		14	0
Bežanija (loan)	2018–19	Serbian First League	20	0	1	0	—		—		21	0
Bežanija (loan)	Total		34	0	1	0	—		—		35	0
Voždovac	2020–21	Serbian SuperLiga	7	0	3	0	—		—		10	0
Voždovac	2021–22	Serbian SuperLiga	17	0	1	0	—		—		18	0
Voždovac	2022–23	Serbian SuperLiga	24	0	0	0	—		—		24	0
Voždovac	Total		48	0	4	0	—		—		52	0
Hajer	2023–24	Saudi First Division	2	0	0	0	—		—		2	0
Partizan	2023–24	Serbian SuperLiga	3	0	0	0	—		—		3	0
Partizan	2024–25	Serbian SuperLiga	0	0	0	0	0	0	—		0	0
Partizan	2025–26	Serbian SuperLiga	3	0	1	0	1 (Note: Appearance(s) in UEFA Conference League)	0	—		5	0
Partizan	2026–27	Serbian SuperLiga	7	0	1	0	5	0	—		13	0
Partizan	Total		13	0	2	0	6	0	—		21	0
Career total			182	0	9	0	6	0	0	0	197	0
