= Mihajlo Ilić =

Serbian footballer (born 2003)

Personal information
- Date of birth: 4 July 2003 (age 23)
- Place of birth: Jagodina, Serbia and Montenegro
- Height: 1.92 m (6 ft 4 in)
- Position: Centre-back

Team information
- Current team: Cesena (on loan from Bologna)
- Number: 6

Youth career
- Junior Jagodina
- 2010–2016: Jagodina
- 2016–2022: Partizan

Senior career*
Years	Team	Apps	(Gls)
2021–2024	Partizan	27	(1)
2024–	Bologna	0	(0)
2024–2025	→ Partizan (loan)	29	(3)
2025–2026	→ Anderlecht (loan)	10	(0)
2026–	→ Cesena (loan)	9	(0)

International career^{‡}
2022	Serbia U19	7	(1)
2022–2024	Serbia U21	12	(2)
- * Club domestic league appearances and goals as of 4 November 2026 ‡ National team caps and goals as of 10 September 2024

Mihajlo Ilić (Serbian Cyrillic: Михајло Илић; born 4 June 2003) is a Serbian professional footballer who plays as a centre-back for Serie B club Cesena, on loan from Bologna.

== Club career ==
=== Partizan ===
Ilić started training in Junior Jagodina, later moving to Jagodina. He became a member of Belgrade side FK Partizan in 2016, where he later passed the junior competition selections. At the end of October 2020, he signed a professional contract with the club. He made his Serbian SuperLiga debut on 21 November 2021, against Vojvodina, replacing Danilo Pantić on the field in the 80th minute of the match. He extended his contract with the club in July 2022 until 2027. He was in the starting lineup of a Serbian SuperLiga match for the first time in the 18th round of the 2022–23 season against TSC. He made his debut in the Europa Conference League against Sheriff Tiraspol, in a match played in Chișinău on 16 February 2023, replacing Kristijan Belić in the second half after the exclusion of Igor Vujačić. He started the following season as a standard bonus footballer in Igor Duljaj's lineup. On 12 November 2023, Ilić scored his first goal for Partizan in a 2–1 win over Čukarički. With Mihajlo Ilic's goal in the 96th minute of stoppage time, Partizan overcame Čuakrički, who already thought he had ended the triumphant streak of Igor Duljaj's team and took the point home. On 20 December 2023, Mihajlo Ilić won his first Eternal derby in a 2–1 win over Red Star.

=== Bologna ===
On 19 January 2024, Ilić signed a four-and-a-half-year contract with Serie A club Bologna, for a reported €4.5 million transfer fee. On 12 September 2024, Ilić returned on loan to former club Partizan until the end of the season. On 8 September 2025, Ilić was loaned by Anderlecht in Belgium.

On 14 August 2026, Ilić was announced on loan at Cesena.

== International career ==
Serbia national under-19 team head coach Aleksandar Jović invited Ilić for a friendly match against Croatia in March 2022. He made his debut in that game as Serbia won by a score of 3–0. Ilić was also invited to the final stage of the 2022 UEFA European Under-19 Championship qualification rounds, played at the beginning of June 2022. He scored his first goal for the youth team of Serbia in a draw with Ukraine. By winning first place in the Group 6 table, Ilić and the team qualified for the European Championship. He played in all three games in the group stage, after which the Serbian team ended its participation. Goran Stevanović, head coach of the Serbia national under-21 team, sent Ilić an invitation for a friendly match with Bulgaria in September 2022. At that match, only the first half was played, as there was an interruption due to bad weather. He was then invited for friendly matches in Cyprus in November 2022, where he led Serbia as captain against the home team and against North Macedonia. At the start of European Championship qualifiers under Dušan Đorđević, Ilić scored both goals in a win over Azerbaijan in September 2023. The coach of the Serbia national team, Dragan Stojković, invited Ilić to a wider list of players for the UEFA Euro 2024 qualifying matches with Hungary and Montenegro during the following month.

== Career statistics ==
As of match played 3 May 2026

Appearances and goals by club, season and competition
Club	Season	League			National cup		Europe		Other		Total	
Club	Season	Division	Apps	Goals	Apps	Goals	Apps	Goals	Apps	Goals	Apps	Goals
Partizan	2021–22	Serbian SuperLiga	1	0	0	0	0	0	0	0	1	0
Partizan	2022–23	Serbian SuperLiga	8	0	0	0	1 (Note: Appearances in UEFA Europa Conference League)	0	0	0	9	0
Partizan	2023–24	Serbian SuperLiga	18	1	0	0	4	0	0	0	22	1
Partizan	Total		27	1	0	0	5	0	0	0	32	1
Bologna	2023–24	Serie A	0	0	0	0	—		—		0	0
Partizan (loan)	2024–25	Serbian SuperLiga	29	3	2	1	—		—		31	4
Anderlecht (loan)	2025–26	Belgian Pro League	10	0	3	0	—		—		13	0
Career total			66	4	5	1	5	0	0	0	76	5
