= Mateja Gašić =

Serbian footballer

Personal information
- Date of birth: 16 February 2003 (age 23)
- Place of birth: Belgrade, Serbia and Montenegro
- Height: 1.77 m (5 ft 10 in)
- Position: Right-back

Team information
- Current team: Vojvodina
- Number: 66

Youth career
- –2021: Rad

Senior career*
Years	Team	Apps	(Gls)
2021–2023	Rad	56	(0)
2023–2026	Radnik Surdulica	105	(3)
2026–	Vojvodina	4	(0)

International career^{‡}
2021	Serbia U19	2	(0)
- * Club domestic league appearances and goals as of 24 October 2026 ‡ National team caps and goals as of 5 September 2021

Mateja Gašić (Serbian Cyrillic: Матеја Гашић; born 16 February 2003) is a professional footballer who plays as a right-back for Serbian SuperLiga club Vojvodina.

== Club career ==
=== Rad ===
He is a product of Rad youth academy. He signed a scholarship deal with the club in October 2019, and first professional contract in February 2021 His first team debut came in season 2021–22.

=== Radnik Surdulica ===
On 17 July 2023, Gašić signed for Serbian SuperLiga side Radnik Surdulica.

=== Vojvodina ===
On 25 August 2026, Gašić signed a four-year deal with another SuperLiga side Vojvodina, for an estimated transfer fee of €450,000.

== Career statistics ==
As of 24 October 2026

Club	Season	League			Cup		Continental		Other		Total	
Club	Season	Division	Apps	Goals	Apps	Goals	Apps	Goals	Apps	Goals	Apps	Goals
Rad	2021–22	Serbian First League	27	0	3	0	–		–		30	0
Rad	2022–23	Serbian First League	29	0	1	0	–		–		30	0
Rad	Total		56	0	4	0	–		–		60	0
Radnik Surdulica	2023–24	Serbian SuperLiga	33	1	1	0	–		–		34	1
Radnik Surdulica	2024–25	Serbian First League	35	1	2	0	–		–		37	1
Radnik Surdulica	2025–26	Serbian SuperLiga	34	1	0	0	–		–		34	1
Radnik Surdulica	2026–27	Serbian SuperLiga	3	0	–		–		–		3	0
Radnik Surdulica	Total		105	3	3	0	–		–		108	3
Vojvodina	2026–27	Serbian SuperLiga	4	0	0	0	–		–		4	0
Career total			165	3	7	0	–		–		172	3
