= Nikola Vukić =

Serbian footballer (born 2004)

Personal information
- Date of birth: 20 May 2004 (age 22)
- Place of birth: Niš, Serbia and Montenegro
- Height: 1.78 m (5 ft 10 in)
- Position: Midfielder

Team information
- Current team: Al Jazira
- Number: 22

Youth career
- –2021: Radnički Niš

Senior career*
Years	Team	Apps	(Gls)
2021–2024	IMT	54	(5)
2024–	Al Jazira	11	(0)

International career^{‡}
2020	Serbia U17	2	(0)
2022	Serbia U18	1	(0)
- * Club domestic league appearances and goals as of 10 October 2025 ‡ National team caps and goals as of 15 November 2019

Nikola Vukić (born 20 May 2004) is a Serbian football player who plays for Al Jazira.
