= Aleksa Janković (footballer) =

Serbian footballer

Personal information
- Date of birth: 12 April 2000 (age 26)
- Place of birth: Požarevac, FR Yugoslavia
- Height: 1.83 m (6 ft 0 in)
- Position: Winger

Team information
- Current team: Sumgayit
- Number: 11

Youth career
- 2012–2019: Partizan

Senior career*
Years	Team	Apps	(Gls)
2019	Partizan	0	(0)
2019	→ Teleoptik (loan)	9	(2)
2020–2021	Voždovac	29	(2)
2021–2024	Čukarički	31	(2)
2024	Partizan	8	(1)
2024–2025	Radnički 1923	16	(0)
2025–	Sumgayit	32	(4)

International career
2016	Serbia U17	3	(0)
2021–2022	Serbia U21	3	(0)
- * Club domestic league appearances and goals as of 22 June 2026

Aleksa Janković (Serbian Cyrillic: Алексa Јанковић; born 15 June 2000) is a Serbian professional footballer who plays as a midfielder for Sumgayit.

== Career ==
=== Early career ===
Janković came through the youth system of FK Partizan and was considered part of the club’s emerging generation of academy players.

=== Čukarički ===
After leaving Partizan, he joined FK Čukarički, where he became part of the senior squad competing in the Serbian SuperLiga and European qualifying competitions. Ahead of a UEFA Europa Conference League fixture, Serbian sports daily Mozzart Sport highlighted Janković as one of the motivated members of the squad travelling for the tie.

=== Radnički 1923 ===
In 2024, he transferred to FK Radnički 1923. The move was covered by TV Arena Sport, reporting on his departure from Partizan and continuation of his professional career in the Serbian top division.

=== Azerbaijan spell ===
Janković later played abroad in Azerbaijan. While playing for Sumqayıt, he scored in a league match, with B92 Sport noting his contribution to the team’s victory.

During his time back in Serbia, he also gave interviews about facing former clubs, again receiving coverage in national sports media.
