= Borko Duronjić =

Serbian footballer

Personal information
- Full name: Borko Duronjić
- Date of birth: 24 September 1997 (age 29)
- Place of birth: Banja Luka, Bosnia and Herzegovina
- Height: 1.71 m (5 ft 7 in)
- Position: Forward

Team information
- Current team: Radnik Surdulica
- Number: 11

Youth career
- Red Star Belgrade
- OFK Beograd

Senior career*
Years	Team	Apps	(Gls)
2014–2016	OFK Beograd	43	(3)
2017–2019	Voždovac	64	(5)
2019–2021	TSC Bačka Topola	62	(3)
2021	Radnički Niš	15	(0)
2022–2024	Radnik Surdulica	75	(13)
2024–2025	Uthai Thani	16	(0)
2025–	Radnik Surdulica	23	(3)

International career
2013	Serbia U17	2	(1)
2015–2016	Serbia U19	4	(2)
- * Club domestic league appearances and goals as of 12 June 2026

Borko Duronjić (Serbian Cyrillic: Борко Дуроњић; born 24 September 1997) is a professional footballer who plays as a forward for Serbian SuperLiga club Radnik Surdulica. His previous clubs was Radnik Surdulica, Radnički Niš and TSC. Born in Bosnia, he has represented Serbia at youth level.

== Honours ==
- Serbian SuperLiga Player of the Week: 2023–24 (Round 23),
