= 2023–24 Serbian SuperLiga =

Association football league season

SuperLiga
- Season: 2023–24
- Dates: 29 July 2023 – 25 May 2024
- Teams: 16
- Champions: Red Star (10th title)
- Relegated: Javor-Matis; Radnik; Voždovac
- Champions League: Red Star Belgrade; Partizan
- UEFA Europa League: TSC; FK Vojvodina
- Europa Conference League: Radnički 1923
- Matches: 200
- Goals: 539 (2.7 per match)
- Top goalscorer: Matheus Saldanha; Miloš Luković (17 goals each)
- Biggest home win: TSC 6–0 Napredak
- Biggest away win: Radnički 1923 0–4 Partizan; Napredak 0–4 IMT; Partizan 0–4 TSC; Radnički 1923 0–4 Novi Pazar
- Highest scoring: TSC 6–3 FK Železničar Pančevo
- Longest winning run: Red Star Belgrade (17 games)
- Longest unbeaten run: Red Star Belgrade (17 games)
- Longest winless run: Radnik (20 games)
- Longest losing run: Voždovac, Radnik, Partizan (5 games)
- All statistics correct as of 13 March 2024.

The 2023–24 Serbian SuperLiga (known as the Mozzart Bet SuperLiga for sponsorship reasons) is the 18th season of the Serbian SuperLiga, the top football league of Serbia. Red Star are the defending champions, having won their ninth SuperLiga and 34th domestic title in the previous season.

The season was initially scheduled to start on 22 July, but the start was deferred to 29 July 2023 due to a complaint made by Kolubara to CAS regarding points deduction from previous season that had led to their relegation.

On 1 May 2024, Red Star Belgrade were crowned champions for the seventh consecutive season following their 2–1 victory over TSC. This was also Red Star's tenth title overall and 35th domestic title.

== Summary ==
The format of the competition remained the same as the last season - each team plays each other twice in round-robin format after which top half play in Championship round and bottom half in Relegation round Play-offs. Last two teams from Relegation round will be relegated while teams finishing 13th and 14th will play Relegations play-off against teams who finished third and fourth in Serbian First League. One of the changes from the previous season was regarding to the status of foreign players. Teams can still have unlimited number of foreign players with a maximum of 4 fielded at any time. However, from this season on, players who hold citizenship of any of the European Union member states are no longer treated as a foreign players.

== Teams ==
Sixteen teams compete in the league, with the top fourteen being from previous season and two teams promoted from Serbian First League. Promoted teams were IMT and Železničar, with the latter being promoted to the SuperLiga for the first time in their history. They replaced FK Mladost Novi Sad and Kolubara, who were relegated after one and two years respectively in top tier.

=== Stadium and locations ===
Čukarički	IMT	Javor-Matis	Mladost Lučani
Čukarički Stadium	Shopping Center Stadium (Note: IMT will play their home games at Voždovac's Shopping Center Stadium, due to their home ground not meeting SuperLiga standards.)	Stadion Kraj Moravice	Stadion FK Mladost Lučani
Capacity: 4,070	Capacity: 5,175	Capacity: 3,000	Capacity: 8,000
Napredak	Locations of the 2023–24 Serbian SuperLiga teams Locations of the 2023–24 Serbian SuperLiga teams on the territory of Belgrade		Novi Pazar
Mladost Lučani Stadium	Locations of the 2023–24 Serbian SuperLiga teams Locations of the 2023–24 Serbian SuperLiga teams on the territory of Belgrade		Novi Pazar City Stadium
Capacity: 10,330	Locations of the 2023–24 Serbian SuperLiga teams Locations of the 2023–24 Serbian SuperLiga teams on the territory of Belgrade		Capacity: 12,000
Partizan	Locations of the 2023–24 Serbian SuperLiga teams Locations of the 2023–24 Serbian SuperLiga teams on the territory of Belgrade		Radnički 1923
Partizan Stadium	Locations of the 2023–24 Serbian SuperLiga teams Locations of the 2023–24 Serbian SuperLiga teams on the territory of Belgrade		Čika Dača Stadium
Capacity: 29,775	Locations of the 2023–24 Serbian SuperLiga teams Locations of the 2023–24 Serbian SuperLiga teams on the territory of Belgrade		Capacity: 15,100
Radnički	Radnik	Red Star	Spartak
Čair Stadium	Surdulica City Stadium	Rajko Mitić Stadium	Subotica City Stadium
Capacity: 18,151	Capacity: 3,312	Capacity: 51,755	Capacity: 13,000
TSC	Vojvodina	Voždovac	Železničar
TSC Arena	Karađorđe Stadium	Shopping Center Stadium	SC Mladost Stadium
Capacity: 4,500	Capacity: 14,458	Capacity: 5,175	Capacity: 2,300

=== Personnel, Kits and General sponsor ===
Note: Flags indicate national team as has been defined under FIFA eligibility rules. Players and Managers may hold more than one non-FIFA nationality.

Team	Head coach	Captain	Kit manufacturer	General Sponsor
Čukarički	(Serbia) Goran Stanić	(Serbia) Marko Docić	Adidas	Oliva
IMT	(Serbia) Nebojša Jandrić	(Serbia) Miloš Luković	Seven	Admiralbet
Javor-Matis	(Serbia) Radovan Ćurčić	(Serbia) Nemanja Miletić	Miteks	Matis Group
Mladost Lučani	(Serbia) Nermin Useni (caretaker)	(Serbia) Ivan Milošević	Miteks	Efbet
Napredak	(Serbia) Ivan Stefanović	(Serbia) Uroš Ljubomirac	Givova	mt:s
Novi Pazar	(Serbia) Slavko Matić	(Guinea) Seydouba Soumah	Macron	Doha Group
Partizan	(Serbia) Albert Nađ	(Serbia) Svetozar Marković	Puma	MaxBet
Radnički 1923	(Bosnia and Herzegovina) Feđa Dudić	(Serbia) Miloš Vidović	Jako	Mozzart Bet
Radnički Niš	(Serbia) Dejan Joksimović	(Serbia) Vanja Ilić	Beltona	mt:s
Radnik	(Serbia) Slobodan Halilović	(Serbia) Mihailo Oreščanin	Jako	Efbet
Red Star	(Serbia) Vladan Milojević	(Austria) Aleksandar Dragović	Macron	Gazprom
Spartak	(Serbia) Miloš Kruščić	(Serbia) Dejan Kerkez	Legea	Efbet
TSC	(Serbia) Žarko Lazetić	(Serbia) Goran Antonić	Capelli Sport	SAT-TRAKT
Vojvodina	(Montenegro) Božidar Bandović	(Serbia) Dejan Zukić	Kelme	Srbijagas
Voždovac	(Serbia) Mihajlo Trajković	(Serbia) Nikola Đuričić	Joma	Stadion SC, Efbet
Železničar	(Serbia) Tomislav Sivić	(Serbia) Aleksandar Đorđević	Puma	Admiralbet

Notes

- Nike is the official ball supplier for Serbian SuperLiga.
- Kelme is the official sponsor of the Referee's Committee of the Football Association of Serbia.

=== Managerial changes ===
Team	Outgoing manager	Manner of departure	Date of vacancy	Position in the table	Incoming manager	Date of appointment
Javor-Matis	(Serbia) Mladen Dodić	Sacked	25 May 2023	Pre-season	(Serbia) Radovan Ćurčić	4 June 2023
Red Star Belgrade	(Serbia) Miloš Milojević	Mutual termination	1 June 2023	Pre-season	(Israel) Barak Bakhar	1 June 2023
Radnički Niš	(Serbia) Dragan Šarac	Sacked	2 June 2023	Pre-season	(Serbia) Nikola Trajković	13 June 2023
Mladost Lučani	(Serbia) Tomislav Sivić	Sacked	5 June 2023	Pre-season	(Serbia) Igor Savić	5 June 2023
Novi Pazar	(Serbia) Davor Berber	Mutual termination	5 June 2023	Pre-season	(Serbia) Dragan Aničić	5 June 2023
Spartak	(Serbia) Milan Milanović	Mutual termination	11 June 2023	Pre-season	(Russia) Aleksandr Kerzhakov	17 June 2023
Železničar	(Serbia) Vladimir Gaćinović	Contract expired	15 June 2023	Pre-season	(Serbia) Predrag Rogan	15 June 2023
Voždovac	(Serbia) Nikola Puača	Mutual termination	20 June 2023	Pre-season	(Serbia) Marko Savić	20 June 2023
Radnik	(Serbia) Slavoljub Đorđević	Mutual termination	21 June 2023	Pre-season	(Serbia) Zoran Ljubinković	21 June 2023
Vojvodina	(Montenegro) Radoslav Batak	Sacked	8 August 2023	16th	(Serbia) Ranko Popović	11 August 2023
Čukarički	(Bosnia and Herzegovina) Dušan Kerkez	Mutual termination	15 August 2023	4th	(Serbia) Igor Matić	15 August 2023
Železničar	(Serbia) Predrag Rogan	Sacked	21 August 2023	13th	(Serbia) Aleksandar Linta	22 August 2023
Novi Pazar	(Serbia) Dragan Aničić	Sacked	22 August 2023	11th	(Cyprus) Siniša Dobrašinović	22 August 2023
Radnički	(Serbia) Dejan Joksimović	Sacked	24 September 2023	16th	(Bosnia and Herzegovina) Feđa Dudić	24 September 2023
Železničar	(Serbia) Aleksandar Linta	Sacked	11 October 2023	16th	(Serbia) Nenad Mijailović	18 October 2023
Mladost Lučani	(Serbia) Igor Savić	Mutual termination	23 October 2023	8th	(Serbia) Tomislav Sivić	25 October 2023
Napredak Kruševac	(Serbia) Dragan Perišić	Mutual termination	24 October 2023	15th	(Serbia) Vladimir Gaćinović	2 November 2023
Radnički Niš	(Serbia) Nikola Trajković	Sacked	13 November 2023	14th	(Serbia) Slavoljub Đorđević	14 November 2023
Spartak Subotica	(Russia) Aleksandr Kerzhakov	Sacked	13 November 2023	11th	(Serbia) Nenad Lalatović	16 November 2023
Radnik Surdulica	(Serbia) Zoran Ljubinković	Sacked	13 November 2023	16th	(Serbia) Milan Milanović	21 November 2023
Red Star Belgrade	(Israel) Barak Bakhar	Sacked	20 December 2023	2nd	(Serbia) Vladan Milojević	22 December 2023
Vojvodina	(Serbia) Ranko Popović	Signed with (Japan) Kashima Antlers	21 December 2023	7th	(Montenegro) Božidar Bandović	28 December 2023
Čukarički	(Serbia) Igor Matić	Mutual termination	26 December 2023	4th	(Serbia) Gordan Petrić	6 January 2024
Novi Pazar	(Cyprus) Siniša Dobrašinović	Sacked	31 December 2023	5th	(Serbia) Igor Matić	6 January 2024
Radnički Niš	(Serbia) Slavoljub Đorđević	Sacked	8 January 2024	15th	(Serbia) Nikola Trajković	8 January 2024
Radnik Surdulica	(Serbia) Milan Milanović	Sacked	11 January 2024	16th	(Serbia) Dušan Đorđević	11 January 2024
Voždovac	(Serbia) Marko Savić	Mutual termination	1 February 2024	6th	(Serbia) Nikola Mitić	2 February 2024
Radnički Niš	(Serbia) Nikola Trajković	Resigned	9 March 2024	13th	(Serbia) Dejan Joksimović	15 March 2024
Čukarički	(Serbia) Gordan Petrić	Sacked	13 March 2024	5th	(Serbia) Goran Stanić	19 March 2024
Železničar	(Serbia) Nenad Mijailović	Sacked	24 March 2024	15th	(Cyprus) Siniša Dobrašinović	26 March 2024
Novi Pazar	(Serbia) Igor Matić	Sacked	29 March 2024	8th	(Serbia) Dragan Žarković (caretaker)	2 April 2024
Novi Pazar	(Serbia) Dragan Žarković (caretaker)	End of caretaker spell	3 April 2024	9th	(Serbia) Slavko Matić	3 April 2024
Spartak Subotica	(Serbia) Nenad Lalatović	Mutual termination	8 April 2024	12th	(Serbia) Miloš Kruščić	9 April 2024
Radnik Surdulica	(Serbia) Dušan Đorđević	Mutual termination	9 April 2024	16th	(Serbia) Dejan Đuričić (caretaker)	9 April 2024
Napredak Kruševac	(Serbia) Vladimir Gaćinović	Resigned	14 April 2024	8th	(Serbia) Ivan Stefanović	18 April 2024
Železničar	(Cyprus) Siniša Dobrašinović	Resigned	27 April 2024	15th	(Serbia) Tomislav Sivić	29 April 2024
Mladost Lučani	(Serbia) Tomislav Sivić	Sacked	29 April 2024	7th	(Serbia) Nermin Useni (caretaker)	29 April 2024
Partizan	(Serbia) Igor Duljaj	Sacked	29 April 2024	2th	(Serbia) Albert Nađ	30 April 2024
Radnik Surdulica	(Serbia) Dejan Đuričić (caretaker)	End of caretaker spell	1 May 2024	16th	(Serbia) Slobodan Halilović	1 May 2024
Voždovac	(Serbia) Nikola Mitić	Mutual termination	9 May 2024	14th	(Serbia) Mihajlo Trajković	10 May 2024

== Regular season ==
=== League table ===
Pos	Team	Pld	W	D	L	GF	GA	GD	Pts	Qualification
1	Red Star Belgrade	30	25	2	3	77	22	+55	77	Qualification for the Championship round
2	Partizan	30	22	4	4	66	35	+31	70	Qualification for the Championship round
3	TSC	30	17	9	4	57	29	+28	60	Qualification for the Championship round
4	Vojvodina	30	14	8	8	49	42	+7	50	Qualification for the Championship round
5	Radnički 1923	30	16	2	12	46	46	0	50	Qualification for the Championship round
6	Čukarički	30	13	9	8	44	33	+11	48	Qualification for the Championship round
7	Mladost Lučani	30	11	7	12	30	40	−10	40	Qualification for the Championship round
8	Napredak Kruševac	30	11	6	13	31	39	−8	39	Qualification for the Championship round
9	Novi Pazar	30	10	6	14	35	40	−5	36	Qualification for the Relegation round
10	Spartak Subotica	30	10	4	16	29	44	−15	34	Qualification for the Relegation round
11	Radnički Niš	30	9	6	15	33	40	−7	33	Qualification for the Relegation round
12	IMT	30	9	5	16	34	47	−13	32	Qualification for the Relegation round
13	Javor-Matis	30	9	4	17	28	45	−17	31	Qualification for the Relegation round
14	Voždovac	30	7	9	14	38	48	−10	30	Qualification for the Relegation round
15	Železničar	30	7	5	18	34	59	−25	26	Qualification for the Relegation round
16	Radnik Surdulica	30	3	8	19	19	41	−22	17	Qualification for the Relegation round

Source: SuperLiga (in Serbian)
Rules for classification: 1) Points; 2) Head-to-head points; 3) Head-to-head goal difference; 4) Head-to-head goals scored; 5) Head-to-head away goals scored (if two teams tied); 6) Goal difference; 7) Goals scored; 8) Fair play ranking; 9) Draw.

=== Results ===
Home \ Away	ČUK	IMT	JAV	MLA	NAP	NPZ	PAR	RDK	RNI	RSU	RSB	SPA	TSC	VOJ	VOŽ	ŽEL
Čukarički		0–1	2–2	3–0	2–1	2–0	3–2	4–1	2–0	0–0	2–1	2–2	0–2	2–2	1–1	2–1
IMT	3–0		2–1	0–1	1–1	1–0	2–3	1–0	0–3	1–1	1–2	0–1	0–2	1–3	2–2	1–1
Javor-Matis	1–2	1–1		1–0	0–2	3–1	0–1	0–3	1–0	2–1	0–3	2–0	0–3	2–2	4–0	2–1
Mladost Lučani	1–0	1–2	1–0		1–2	2–0	1–1	2–0	1–2	0–0	1–4	2–1	1–1	2–2	2–0	1–0
Napredak Kruševac	1–0	0–4	3–0	0–1		3–1	0–2	1–3	1–0	0–2	0–1	1–1	0–0	0–0	2–1	0–1
Novi Pazar	1–0	3–4	2–0	0–0	2–1		0–1	2–0	2–2	2–1	0–3	0–1	3–4	3–1	2–2	1–0
Partizan	2–1	5–2	3–1	2–0	0–1	2–0		3–3	2–1	3–2	2–1	1–0	0–4	3–1	3–0	3–1
Radnički 1923	1–2	1–0	2–0	4–1	3–1	0–4	0–4		3–2	1–0	0–3	3–1	0–0	2–1	3–0	3–0
Radnički Niš	0–2	1–0	1–0	3–0	1–1	0–1	2–1	4–1		0–3	0–2	1–1	0–3	0–1	2–1	1–1
Radnik Surdulica	0–3	0–1	0–1	1–1	1–2	0–0	1–2	0–1	0–0		0–2	2–0	0–1	0–4	1–1	0–1
Red Star Belgrade	3–0	2–0	3–2	3–1	4–0	2–1	2–2	5–0	1–0	3–1		3–0	1–1	5–0	2–1	3–0
Spartak Subotica	0–3	2–1	1–0	0–1	1–3	0–1	0–3	1–3	1–2	1–0	1–4		2–4	2–0	1–0	3–0
TSC	0–0	1–0	3–0	4–1	1–1	1–1	3–3	1–0	1–0	1–0	1–3	0–2		1–2	2–0	6–3
Vojvodina	1–1	2–1	2–1	1–1	2–0	1–0	0–2	2–1	3–2	3–0	1–2	0–0	3–2		2–1	2–2
Voždovac	1–1	4–0	0–0	3–1	1–2	1–0	2–3	1–2	1–1	1–1	3–2	0–2	1–1	3–2		5–1
Železničar	2–2	3–1	0–1	0–2	2–1	2–2	1–2	0–2	3–2	3–1	1–2	2–1	2–3	0–3	0–1	

Source: SuperLiga (in Serbian)
Legend: Blue = home team win; Yellow = draw; Red = away team win.
For upcoming matches, an "a" indicates there is an article about the rivalry between the two participants.

== Play-offs ==
=== Championship round ===
The top eight teams advance from the regular season. Teams play each other once.

==== League table ====
Pos	Team	Pld	W	D	L	GF	GA	GD	Pts	Qualification	RSB	PAR	TSC	VOJ	RDK	CUK	MLA	NAP
1	Red Star Belgrade (C)	37	31	3	3	94	28	+66	96	Qualification for the Champions League play-off round		3–2	2–1		3–2	4–1		
2	Partizan	37	24	6	7	80	48	+32	78	Qualification for the Champions League second qualifying round			1–2	2–3	2–2		3–0	
3	TSC	37	22	9	6	75	39	+36	75	Qualification for the Europa League play-off round (Note: The winner of the 2023–24 Serbian Cup, Red Star Belgrade, has already qualified for 2024–25 UEFA Champions League, so the berth is awarded to third place TSC.)				3–2	4–3	2–0		6–0
4	Vojvodina	37	17	10	10	62	50	+12	61	Qualification for the Europa League second qualifying round	0–0					2–3	1–0	5–0
5	Radnički 1923	37	19	4	14	64	61	+3	61	Qualification for the Conference League second qualifying round				0–0		4–3	3–2	
6	Čukarički	37	16	9	12	57	47	+10	57			0–1					4–1	2–0
7	Mladost Lučani	37	13	7	17	38	53	−15	46		0–1		2–0					3–1
8	Napredak Kruševac	37	11	7	19	36	66	−30	40		0–4	3–3			1–4			

Source: SuperLiga (in Serbian)
Legend: Blue = home team win; Yellow = draw; Red = away team win.
Rules for classification: 1) Points; 2) Points in regular season; 3) Head-to-head points in regular season; 4) Head-to-head goal difference in regular season; 5) Head-to-head goals scored in regular season; 6) Head-to-head away goals scored in regular season (if two teams tied); 7) Goal difference; 8) Goals scored; 9) Fair play ranking; 10) Drawing of lots.
(C) Champions

=== Relegation round ===
The bottom eight teams from the regular season play in the relegation round. Teams play each other once.

==== League table ====
Pos	Team	Pld	W	D	L	GF	GA	GD	Pts	Qualification or relegation	NPZ	SPA	IMT	RNI	JAV	ŽEL	VOŽ	RSU
1	Novi Pazar	37	14	6	17	44	47	−3	48			0–1		2–1	1–0		0–1	
2	Spartak Subotica	37	13	8	16	36	47	−11	47				1–1	3–1	1–0	1–1		
3	IMT	37	11	9	17	43	53	−10	42		0–1					0–0	2–1	5–2
4	Radnički Niš	37	11	8	18	40	48	−8	41				0–0		1–2		2–0	1–0
5	Javor-Matis (R)	37	11	7	19	34	51	−17	40	Qualification for the play-off			1–1			1–1	1–1	
6	Železničar (O)	37	10	9	18	47	65	−18	39	Qualification for the play-off	3–1			1–1				4–0
7	Voždovac (R)	37	9	11	17	46	58	−12	38	Relegation to Serbian First League		0–0				2–3		3–2
8	Radnik Surdulica (R)	37	3	9	25	24	59	−35	18	Relegation to Serbian First League	1–4	0–0			0–1			

Updated to match(es) played on 24 May 2024. Source: SuperLiga (in Serbian)
Legend: Blue = home team win; Yellow = draw; Red = away team win.
Rules for classification: 1) Points; 2) Points in regular season; 3) Head-to-head points in regular season; 4) Head-to-head goal difference in regular season; 5) Head-to-head goals scored in regular season; 6) Head-to-head away goals scored in regular season (if two teams tied); 7) Goal difference; 8) Goals scored; 9) Fair play ranking; 10) Drawing of lots.
(O) Play-off winners; (R) Relegated

== Relegation play-offs ==
Two legged relegation play-off matches will be played between the teams placed 13th and 14th at the end of relegation round and the teams placed 3rd and 4th at the end of Serbian First League Championship round.

=== First legs ===
29 May 2024	Tekstilac	1–0	Javor-Matis	Karađorđe Stadium, Novi Sad
18:00	Marković 33'

30 May 2024	Inđija	1–2	Železničar	Lagator Stadium, Loznica
18:00	Janjić 75'		Romanić 9', 21'

=== Second legs ===
3 June 2024	Javor-Matis	1–1 (1–2 agg.)	Tekstilac	Javor Stadium, Ivanjica
18:00	Doucouré 76'		Marković 55'

3 June 2024	Železničar	2–0 (4–1 agg.)	Inđija	SC Mladost, Pančevo
20:00	Kahvić 16'; Ðorđević 90+2' (pen.)

== Individual statistics ==
=== Top scorers ===
As of matches played on 25 May 2024.

Rank	Player	Club	Goals
1	(Serbia) Miloš Luković	IMT	17
1	(Brazil) Matheus Saldanha	Partizan	17
2	(Serbia) Aleksandar Ćirković	TSC	16
3	(Jamaica) Junior Flemmings	Voždovac	12
4	(Serbia) Igor Miladinović	Čukarički	11
4	(Serbia) Milutin Vidosavljević	Radnički 1923	11
4	(Bosnia and Herzegovina) Ifet Đakovac	TSC	11
4	(Senegal) Cherif Ndiaye	Red Star Belgrade	11
4	(Serbia) Miloš Pantović	TSC	11
4	(Israel) Bibras Natcho	Partizan	11
5	(Serbia) Borisav Burmaz	Voždovac	10

=== Hat-tricks ===
Player	For	Against	Result	Date
(Serbia) Luka Zorić	Radnički 1923	Mladost Lučani	4–1	29 October 2023
(Serbia) Milan Vidakov	Radnički 1923	Voždovac	3–0	11 November 2023
(Serbia) Jovan Mijatović	Red Star Belgrade	Spartak	4–1	16 December 2023

=== Player of the week ===
As of matches played on 25 May 2024.

Round	Player	Club	Goals	Assist	Ref.
1	(Ivory Coast) Jean-Philippe Krasso	Red Star Belgrade	2	0	
2	(Ivory Coast) Jean-Philippe Krasso ^{(2)}	Red Star Belgrade ^{(2)}	2	1	
3	(Serbia) Viktor Živojinović	IMT	1	2	
4	(Serbia) Nikola Čumić	Vojvodina	2	0	
5	(Serbia) Vanja Ilić (footballer)	Radnički Niš	2	0	
6	(Serbia) Kristijan Belić	Partizan	0	1	
7	(Nigeria) Sunday Adetunji	Čukarički	1	0	
8	(Serbia) Radomir Milosavljević	Vojvodina ^{(2)}	1	0	
9	(Serbia) Aleksandar Jovanović	Partizan ^{(2)}	0	0	
10	(Serbia) Mihailo Ivanović	Vojvodina ^{(3)}	2	0	
11	(Montenegro) Mirko Ivanić	Red Star Belgrade ^{(3)}	2	0	
12	(Serbia) Stefan Čolović	Radnički 1923	2	0	
13	(Serbia) Luka Zorić	Radnički 1923 ^{(2)}	3	0	
14	(Serbia) Miloš Luković	IMT ^{(2)}	2	0	
15	(Serbia) Milan Vidakov	Radnički 1923 ^{(3)}	3	0	
16	(Ghana) Ibrahim Tanko	Javor	2	2	
17	(Serbia) Mihajlo Nešković	Voždovac	1	1	
18	(Serbia) Aleksandar Mesarović	Radnički Niš ^{(2)}	0	0	
19	(Serbia) Jovan Mijatović	Red Star Belgrade ^{(4)}	3	0	
20	(Serbia) Igor Miladinović	Čukarički ^{(2)}	2	0	
21	(Norway) Ghayas Zahid	Partizan ^{(3)}	1	1	
22	(Serbia) Aleksandar Vulić	Spartak	0	0	
23	(Serbia) Borko Duronjić	Radnik	2	0	
24	(Serbia) Aleksandar Jovanović ^{(2)}	Partizan ^{(4)}	0	0	
25	(Serbia) Luka Adžić	Čukarički ^{(3)}	2	0	
26	(Senegal) Cherif Ndiaye	Red Star Belgrade ^{(5)}	2	0	
27	(Serbia) Mihailo Ivanović ^{(2)}	Vojvodina ^{(4)}	2	0	
28	(Serbia) Ivan Milosavljević	TSC	2	0	
29	(Serbia) Aleksandar Katai	Red Star Belgrade ^{(6)}	2	0	
30	(Serbia) Đorđe Ivanović	Čukarički ^{(4)}	1	1	
31	(Serbia) Vasilije Đurić	Radnički 1923 ^{(4)}	1	0	
32	(Serbia) Miloš Ristić	Radnički 1923 ^{(5)}	2	1	
33	(Serbia) Milutin Vidosavljević	Radnički 1923 ^{(6)}	2	0	
34	(Serbia) Andrija Majdevac	Napredak Kruševac	2	1	
35	(Montenegro) Andrija Radulović	Vojvodina ^{(5)}	1	1	
36	(Serbia) Aleksandar Jovanović ^{(3)}	Partizan ^{(5)}	0	0	
37	(Serbia) Aleksandar Ćirković	TSC ^{(2)}	2	1	

== Awards ==
Team of the Season
Goalkeeper	(Serbia) Aleksandar Jovanović (Partizan)				
Defence	(Serbia) Aleksandar Varjačić (Mladost Lučani)		(Serbia) Uroš Spajić (Red Star)	(Serbia) Nemanja Stojić (TSC)	(Serbia) Milan Rodić (Red Star)
Midfield	(Serbia) Aleksandar Ćirković (TSC)	(South Korea) In-beom Hwang (Red Star)	(Serbia) Adem Ljajić (Novi Pazar)	(Bosnia and Herzegovina) Ifet Đakovac (TSC)	(Montenegro) Mirko Ivanić (Red Star)
Attack	(Brazil) Matheus Saldanha (Partizan)				

== Attendances ==
No.	Club	Average
1	Crvena zvezda	15,761
2	Vojvodina	3,299
3	Partizan	3,278
4	Novi Pazar	2,773
5	Radnički 1923	2,406
6	Napredak Kruševac	2,120
7	TSC	1,568
8	Želeničar Pančevo	1,406
9	Radnički Niš	1,253
10	Javor	944
11	Spartak Subotica	932
12	Radnik Surdulica	672
13	Mladost Lučani	668
14	Čukarički	627
15	Voždovac	508
16	IMT	450
