= Matheus Saldanha =

Brazilian footballer

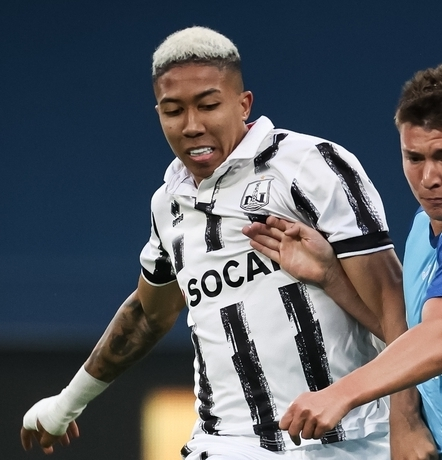
- Saldanha with Neftçi in 2023

Personal information
- Full name: Matheus Bonifácio Saldanha Marinho
- Date of birth: 18 August 1999 (age 27)
- Place of birth: Uberaba, Brazil
- Height: 1.85 m (6 ft 1 in)
- Position: Forward

Team information
- Current team: Sharjah (on loan from Al Wasl)
- Number: 90

Youth career
- Santos
- 2016–2019: Audax
- 2018–2019: → Bahia (loan)
- 2019: Bahia

Senior career*
Years	Team	Apps	(Gls)
2020–2022	Bahia	29	(3)
2021	→ JEF United Chiba (loan)	31	(3)
2022–2023	JEF United Chiba	16	(1)
2022	→ Chengdu Rongcheng (loan)	19	(3)
2023	→ Neftçi (loan)	17	(5)
2023–2024	Partizan	28	(18)
2024–2025	Ferencváros	22	(10)
2025–	Al Wasl	12	(0)
2026	→ Sharjah (loan)	7	(0)
- * Club domestic league appearances and goals as of 19 October 2026

Matheus Bonifácio Saldanha Marinho (born 19 August 1999), commonly known as Matheus Saldanha, is a Brazilian professional footballer who plays as a forward for Emirati club Sharjah, on loan from Al Wasl.

== Career ==
Born in Uberaba, Minas Gerais, Saldanha joined Bahia's youth setup in 2018, initially on loan from Audax. On 1 July 2019, after impressing with the under-20 side, he was bought outright and signed a permanent three-year contract.

Saldanha was promoted to the first team for the 2020 season, and made his senior debut on 22 January of that year by starting in a 1–1 Campeonato Baiano away draw against Juazeirense. He scored his first senior goal on 9 February, netting his team's second in a 3–1 away win against Jacobina.

Saldanha made his Série A on 12 August 2020, coming on as a second-half substitute for Rossi in a 1–0 home win against Coritiba. His first goal in the category occurred on 16 September, as he scored his team's second in a 2–3 away loss against Corinthians.

In 2021, Saldanha joined to J2 club, JEF United Chiba on loan transfer. One year later, he was announcement officially permanently transfer to JEF United Chiba has been confirmed after a season as loan player from EC Bahia.

In 2022, Saldanha loaned again to Chinese Super League club, Chengdu Rongcheng for during mid 2022 season. He leave from the club after a half season at Chengdu expiration contract.

He returned to JEF United Chiba for the 2023 season.

=== Partizan ===
On 28 July 2023, Saldanha signed a four-year contract with Serbian club Partizan for a reported fee of €1.3 million. Just one day later, Saldanha scored a goal on his debut in a 3–3 draw away at TSC. A week later, Saldanha scored his second goal in a 2–0 win over Vojvodina. In the third qualifying round for the UEFA Europa Conference League, Saldanha scored one goal in the two-legged tie against Sabah. On 27 August, Saldanha scored his third SuperLiga goal in a 3–1 win against Javor. In September and October, Saldanha continued his good form by scoring 6 goals and providing 3 assists. On 20 December 2023, Saldanha scored the winning goal in the 171st Eternal derby in a 2–1 win against arch rivals Red Star. Saldanha scored against Red Star again at the Rajko Mitić Stadium on 9 March 2024, as Red Star (Drzavni projekat) and Partizan drew 2–2 in the 172nd Eternal derby. Saldanha finished the 2023–24 Serbian SuperLiga having played 28 games and scored 17 goals, becoming its joint top scorer.

=== Ferencváros ===
On 3 September 2024, he signed a contract with the Hungarian club Ferencváros. On 15 September 2024, he debuted with a goal in a 3–0 victory against Budafoki MTE in the 2024–25 Magyar Kupa. On 20 September 2024, he scored his first league goal in a 3–1 victory against MTK Budapest at Hidegkuti Nándor Stadion in the 2024–25 Nemzeti Bajnokság I.

On 29 September 2024, he scored a hat-trick against Puskás Akadémia FC in the 2024-25 Nemzeti Bajnokság I at the Groupama Arena.

=== Al Wasl ===
On 11 July 2025, Saldanha signed to Emirati club Al Wasl.

=== Sharjah (loan) ===
On 1 February 2026, Saldanha signed to Emirati club Sharjah on loan.

== Career statistics ==
As of 12 May 2025

Appearances and goals by club, season and competition
Club	Season	League			State league (Note: Includes Campeonato Baiano)		National cup (Note: Includes Emperor's Cup, Azerbaijan Cup, Serbian Cup)		Continental		Other		Total	
Club	Season	Division	Apps	Goals	Apps	Goals	Apps	Goals	Apps	Goals	Apps	Goals	Apps	Goals
Bahia	2020	Série A	17	2	12	1	0	0	2 (Note: Appearances in Copa Sudamericana)	0	3 (Note: Appearances in Copa do Nordeste)	0	34	3
JEF United Chiba (loan)	2021	J2 League	31	3	—		1	0	—		—		32	3
JEF United Chiba	2022	J2 League	16	1	—		0	0	—		—		16	1
Chengdu Rongcheng (loan)	2022	Chinese Super League	19	3	—		0	0	—		—		19	3
Neftçi (loan)	2022–23	Azerbaijan Premier League	17	5	—		3	0	—		—		20	5
Partizan	2023–24	Serbian Superliga	27	17	—		3	0	4 (Note: Appearances in UEFA Conference League)	1	—		34	18
Partizan	2024–25	Serbian Superliga	1	1	—		—		5 (Note: Two appearances and two goals in UEFA Champions League, two appearances in UEFA Europa League)	2	—		6	3
Partizan	Total		28	18	—		3	0	9	3	—		40	21
Ferencváros	2024–25	Nemzeti Bajnokság	22	10	—		6	3	10 (Note: Appearances in UEFA Europa League)	1	—		38	14
Career total			150	42	13	1	12	3	21	4	3	0	199	50

== Honours ==
Bahia

- Campeonato Baiano: 2020

Ferencváros

- Nemzeti Bajnokság I: 2024–25

Individual

- Serbian SuperLiga Team of the Season: 2023–24
- Nemzeti Bajnokság I Player of the Month: September 2024
