= Aleksandar Ćirković =

Serbian footballer

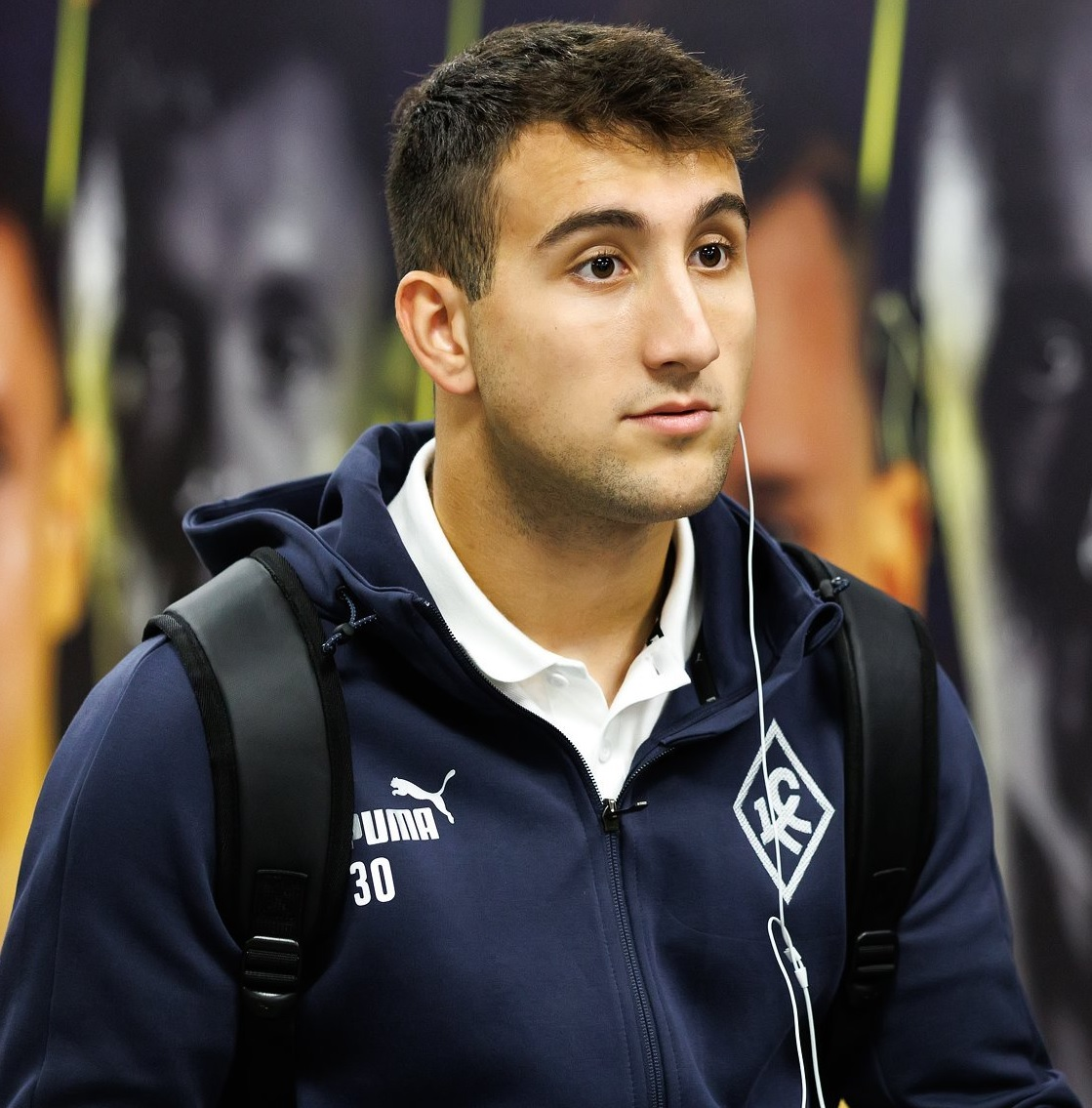
- Ćirković with Krylia Sovetov in 2022

Personal information
- Date of birth: 21 September 2001 (age 25)
- Place of birth: Smederevska Palanka, FR Yugoslavia
- Height: 1.80 m (5 ft 11 in)
- Position: Winger

Team information
- Current team: Jagiellonia Białystok (on loan from Ferencváros)
- Number: 32

Youth career
- 2009–2010: Admira Wacker
- 2010–2011: SC Perchtoldsdorf
- 2011–2012: ASV Vösendorf
- 2012–2018: Admira Wacker

Senior career*
Years	Team	Apps	(Gls)
2018–2020	Admira Wacker II	21	(7)
2020–2021	Admira Wacker	3	(0)
2021	→ Mačva Šabac (loan)	15	(1)
2021	Gimnàstic	0	(0)
2022	Voždovac	21	(5)
2022–2024	Krylia Sovetov	12	(1)
2023–2024	→ TSC (loan)	34	(16)
2024–2025	TSC	18	(4)
2025–	Ferencváros	6	(0)
2025–2026	→ Lechia Gdańsk (loan)	24	(4)
2026–	→ Jagiellonia Białystok (loan)	2	(0)

International career
2022	Serbia U21	2	(0)
- * Club domestic league appearances and goals as of 18:47, 20 September 2026 (UTC)

Aleksandar Ćirković (Serbian Cyrillic: Александар Ћирковић; born 21 September 2001) is a Serbian professional footballer who plays as a left winger for Ekstraklasa club Jagiellonia Białystok, on loan from Ferencváros.

== Club career ==
Born in Smederevska Palanka, Ćirković represented FC Admira Wacker Mödling, SC Perchtoldsdorf and ASV Vösendorf as a youth. He first appeared as a senior with Admira's reserves on 5 May 2019, coming on as a second-half substitute in a 0–4 Regionalliga home loss against ASK Ebreichsdorf.

Ćirković scored his first senior goal on 7 June 2019, netting the opener in a 1–1 away draw against SK Rapid Wien II. He made his first team debut on 11 September of the following year, starting in a 1–4 loss at SK Rapid Wien.

On 2 February 2021, after featuring rarely in the main squad, Ćirković was loaned to Serbian SuperLiga side FK Mačva Šabac for the remainder of the season. He scored his first professional goal on 7 March, netting his team's third in a 3–1 home win over FK Proleter Novi Sad, but was unable to avoid the club's relegation.

On 20 July 2021, Ćirković moved to Spain and signed a three-year contract with Primera División RFEF side Gimnàstic de Tarragona. He terminated his contract on 22 December, after failing to feature a single minute for the club.

On 26 August 2022, Ćirković signed a four-year contract with Krylia Sovetov in Russia.

On 30 June 2023, he was loaned to TSC for the 2023–24 season.

On 22 January 2025, Ćirković was signed by Nemzeti Bajnokság I club Ferencváros.

On 8 September 2025, Ćirković joined Ekstraklasa side Lechia Gdańsk on loan for the rest of the season.

On 1 September 2026, he was sent on loan to another Polish club Jagiellonia Białystok, with an option to make the move permanent.

== Career statistics ==
As of match played 20 September 2026

Appearances and goals by club, season and competition
Club	Season	League			National cup (Note: Includes Austrian Cup, Serbian Cup, Magyar Kupa, Polish Cup)		Continental		Total	
Club	Season	Division	Apps	Goals	Apps	Goals	Apps	Goals	Apps	Goals
Admira Wacker II	2018–19	Austrian Regionalliga East	3	1	—		—		3	1
Admira Wacker II	2019–20	Austrian Regionalliga East	14	4	—		—		14	4
Admira Wacker II	2020–21	Austrian Regionalliga East	4	2	—		—		4	2
Admira Wacker II	Total		21	7	0	0	0	0	21	7
Admira Wacker	2019–20	Austrian Bundesliga	0	0	0	0	—		0	0
Admira Wacker	2020–21	Austrian Bundesliga	3	0	1	2	—		4	2
Admira Wacker	Total		3	0	1	2	0	0	4	2
Mačva Šabac	2020–21	Serbian SuperLiga	15	1	—		—		15	1
Gimnàstic	2021–22	Primera División RFEF	0	0	0	0	—		0	0
Voždovac	2021–22	Serbian SuperLiga	16	5	—		—		16	5
Voždovac	2022–23	Serbian SuperLiga	5	0	—		—		5	0
Voždovac	Total		21	5	0	0	0	0	21	5
Krylia Sovetov Samara	2022–23	Russian Premier League	12	1	8	2	—		20	3
TSC	2023–24	Serbian SuperLiga	34	16	1	0	6 (Note: One appearance in UEFA Champions League, five appearances and one goal in UEFA Europa League)	1	41	17
TSC	2024–25	Serbian SuperLiga	18	4	1	0	8 (Note: Two appearances in UEFA Europa League, six appearances in UEFA Conference League)	0	27	4
TSC	Total		52	20	2	0	14	1	68	21
Ferencváros	2024–25	Nemzeti Bajnokság I	5	0	1	0	0	0	6	0
Ferencváros	2025–26	Nemzeti Bajnokság I	1	0	—		0	0	1	0
Ferencváros	2026–27	Nemzeti Bajnokság I	0	0	—		1 (Note: Appearance in UEFA Europa League)	0	1	0
Ferencváros	Total		6	0	1	0	1	0	8	0
Lechia Gdańsk (loan)	2025–26	Ekstraklasa	24	4	3	2	—		27	6
Jagiellonia Białystok (loan)	2026–27	Ekstraklasa	2	0	0	0	0	0	2	0
Career total			156	38	15	6	15	1	186	45

== Honours ==
Ferencváros

- Nemzeti Bajnokság I: 2024–25

Individual

- Serbian SuperLiga Team of the Season: 2023–24
