= Aleksandar Lukić =

Serbian association football player

Aleksandar Lukić Александар Лукић
Personal information
- Date of birth: 27 February 2002 (age 24)
- Place of birth: Belgrade, FR Yugoslavia
- Height: 1.89 m (6 ft 2 in)
- Position: Defender

Team information
- Current team: Omladinac Novi Banovci

Youth career
- –2017: Čukarički
- 2017–2020: Red Star Belgrade

Senior career*
Years	Team	Apps	(Gls)
2020–2023	Red Star Belgrade	0	(0)
2020	→ Grafičar (loan)	4	(0)
2021–2023	→ IMT (loan)	45	(1)
2023–2024	Voždovac	22	(0)
2024–2025	Mjøndalen	3	(0)
2025	Sereď	0	(0)
2025–2026	Smederevo 1924	4	(0)
2026–	Omladinac Novi Banovci	0	(0)

International career^{‡}
2018–2019	Serbia U17	6	(0)
2019	Serbia U18	1	(0)
2021	Serbia U19	2	(0)
- * Club domestic league appearances and goals as of 19 March 2026 ‡ National team caps and goals as of 10:02, 21 February 2021 (UTC)

Aleksandar Lukić (Serbian Cyrillic: Александар Лукић, born 27 February 2002) is a Serbian footballer who plays as a defender for Serbian League club Omladinac Novi Banovci.

== Career statistics ==
=== Club ===
As of 15 July 2022.

Club	Season	League			Cup		Continental		Total	
Club	Season	Division	Apps	Goals	Apps	Goals	Apps	Goals	Apps	Goals
Red Star Belgrade	2020–21	Serbian SuperLiga	0	0	0	0	0	0	0	0
Grafičar Beograd (loan)	2020–21	Serbian First League	4	0	1	1	–		5	1
IMT (loan)	2021–22	Serbian First League	24	0	0	0	–		24	0
Career total			28	0	1	1	0	0	29	1
