= Bojan Kovačević =

Serbian footballer

Personal information
- Date of birth: 22 May 2004 (age 22)
- Place of birth: Užice, Serbia and Montenegro
- Height: 1.93 m (6 ft 4 in)
- Position: Defender

Team information
- Current team: Cádiz
- Number: 14

Youth career
- –2019: Partizan
- 2019–2021: Čukarički

Senior career*
Years	Team	Apps	(Gls)
2021–2024	Čukarički	34	(1)
2024–2025	Partizan	15	(1)
2024–2025	→ Cádiz (loan)	27	(0)
2025–	Cádiz	32	(0)

International career^{‡}
2020	Serbia U17	3	(0)
2021	Serbia U18	2	(0)
2021–2023	Serbia U19	13	(1)
2024–	Serbia U21	4	(0)
- * Club domestic league appearances and goals as of 20 November 2026 ‡ National team caps and goals as of 17 November 2026

Bojan Kovačević (Serbian Cyrillic: Бојан Ковачевић; born 22 May 2004) is a Serbian professional footballer who plays as a defender for Spanish club Cádiz.

== Club career ==
Kovačević joined Čukarički in 2019 from FK Partizan. In June 2021 he signed his first professional contract. On 18 September 2021 Kovačević made his official senior debut for Čukarički in a match against Spartak Subotica. On 17 July 2022 Kovačević signed a new four-year contract with Čukarički.

On 26 August 2024, Kovačević was loaned to Spanish Segunda División side Cádiz. On 20 June of the following year, he signed a permanent four-year contract with the club.

== International career ==
Kovačević has played internationally for Serbia at under-17, under-18 and under-19 levels.
