= Sadick Abubakar =

Ghanaian professional footballer

Personal information
- Full name: Sadick Abubakar
- Date of birth: 2 February 1998 (age 28)
- Place of birth: Accra, Ghana
- Height: 1.83 m (6 ft 0 in)
- Position: Defender

Team information
- Current team: Radnik Surdulica
- Number: 37

Senior career*
Years	Team	Apps	(Gls)
2019	Nkoranza Warriors	–	(–)
2019	Jönköping	0	(0)
2020	Smederevo 1924	1	(0)
2020–2022	Radnički Sremska Mitrovica	59	(1)
2022–	Radnik Surdulica	92	(2)
- * Club domestic league appearances and goals as of 12 June 2026

Sadick Abubakar (born 2 February 1998) is a Ghanaian professional footballer who plays as a defender for Serbian SuperLiga club Radnik Surdulica.

== Club career ==
Abubakar began his career in Ghana with Nkoranza Warriors before moving abroad in 2019 to Sweden with Jönköping, although he did not feature in the first team.

In 2020, he joined Serbian side Smederevo 1924, making one league appearance, before signing with Radnički Sremska Mitrovica in July 2020. Over two seasons he played 59 matches and scored once.

On 15 September 2022, he signed with FK Radnik Surdulica of the Serbian SuperLiga. On 13 December 2023, Abubakar was sent off in Radnik Surdulica's 2–1 defeat to Novi Pazar. He became a regular for the side, with more than 30 league appearances in his first two campaigns.

== Health incident ==
On 5 March 2025, during a Serbian Cup match against Partizan, Abubakar suffered a heart attack shortly after being substituted. He underwent emergency surgery and had a stent fitted.

By June 2025, he had recovered fully and returned to training with Radnik Surdulica ahead of the new season.

== Career statistics ==
As of 15 May 2021

Club	Season	League			Cup		Continental		Total	
Club	Season	Division	Apps	Goals	Apps	Goals	Apps	Goals	Apps	Goals
Smederevo 1924	2019–20	Serbian First League	1	0	0	0	–	–	1	0
Radnički Sremska Mitrovica	2020–21	Serbian First League	28	0	0	0	–	–	28	0
Total			29	0	0	0	–	–	29	0

== Honours ==
FK Radnik Surdulica

- Serbian First League: 2024–25
