= Andrija Majdevac =

Serbian footballer (born 1997)

Personal information
- Date of birth: 7 August 1997 (age 29)
- Place of birth: Kruševac, FR Yugoslavia
- Height: 1.86 m (6 ft 1 in)
- Position: Forward

Team information
- Current team: Dong Nai City
- Number: 11

Youth career
- Napredak Kruševac

Senior career*
Years	Team	Apps	(Gls)
2015–2018	Napredak Kruševac	13	(0)
2016	→ Temnić (loan)	11	(2)
2017	→ Dinamo Vranje (loan)	8	(1)
2017	→ Temnić (loan)	14	(1)
2018	Inđija	11	(0)
2018–2020	Balzan	33	(21)
2020	→ AEL Limassol (loan)	6	(3)
2020–2022	AEL Limassol	25	(4)
2021	→ Ethnikos Achna (loan)	15	(6)
2022–2023	Novi Pazar	30	(12)
2023–2024	Debrecen	9	(0)
2024	→ Napredak Kruševac (loan)	17	(6)
2024–2025	Panetolikos	26	(3)
2025–2026	Napredak Kruševac	29	(9)
2026–	Dong Nai City	0	(0)

International career^{‡}
2014	Serbia U17	1	(0)
- * Club domestic league appearances and goals as of 13 June 2026 ‡ National team caps and goals as of 7 August 2023

Andrija Majdevac (Serbian Cyrillic: Андрија Мајдевац; born 7 August 1997) is a Serbian professional footballer who plays as a forward for V.League 1 club Dong Nai City.

== Career ==
Born in Kruševac, Majdevac progressed through the youth system of local club Napredak, making his professional debut in a Serbian SuperLiga home match against Jagodina on 4 April 2015. His first appearance of the 2015–16 season came in a cup match against Moravac Mrštane on 28 October 2015. In early 2016, Majdevac was linked to Genk. Majdevac continued playing with the first team in the 2015–16 Serbian First League season, but also stayed with youth selection until the end of season. In summer 2016, Majdevac was loaned to Serbian League East side Temnić. In early 2017, he was loaned to Dinamo Vranje until the end of the 2016–17 Serbian First League season. In summer 2017, he rejoined Temnić on a six-month loan.

On 12 January 2024, Majdevac was loaned by Napredak Kruševac.

In July 2026, Majdevac moved to Vietnam, signing for newly promoted V.League 1 club Dong Nai City.

== Career statistics ==
As of 12 January 2018

Appearances and goals by club, season and competition
Club	Season	League			Cup		Continental		Other		Total	
Club	Season	Division	Apps	Goals	Apps	Goals	Apps	Goals	Apps	Goals	Apps	Goals
Napredak Kruševac	2014–15	Serbian SuperLiga	5	0	0	0	—		0	0	5	0
Napredak Kruševac	2015–16	Serbian First League	8	0	1	0	—		—		9	0
Napredak Kruševac	Total		13	0	1	0	—		0	0	14	0
Temnić (loan)	2016–17	Serbian League East	11	2	—		—		—		11	2
Dinamo Vranje (loan)	2016–17	Serbian First League	8	1	—		—		—		8	1
Temnić (loan)	2017–18	Serbian First League	14	1	—		—		—		14	1
Career total			46	4	1	0	—		0	0	47	7

== Honours ==
Napredak Kruševac

- Serbian First League: 2015–16

Individual

- Serbian SuperLiga Player of the Week: 2023–24 (Round 34)
