= Miloš Ristić =

Serbian footballer (born 1995)

Personal information
- Date of birth: 6 April 1995 (age 31)
- Place of birth: Požega, Serbia, FR Yugoslavia
- Height: 1.89 m (6 ft 2 in)
- Position: Defensive midfielder

Team information
- Current team: Radnički 1923
- Number: 27

Youth career
- Mladost Lučani

Senior career*
| Years | Team | Apps | (Gls) |
| 2014–2020 | Mladost Lučani | 14 | (1) |
| 2014–2015 | → Železničar Lajkovac (loan) | 0 | (0) |
| 2016–2018 | → Sloga Požega (loan) | 0 | (0) |
| 2020–2022 | Sloga Požega | 0 | (0) |
| 2020–2023 | Sloboda Užice | 35 | (5) |
| 2023– | Radnički 1923 | 86 | (5) |
- * Club domestic league appearances and goals as of 5 June 2026

Miloš Ristić (Serbian Cyrillic: Милош Ристић; born 6 April 1995) is a Serbian professional footballer who plays as a defensive midfielder for Serbian SuperLiga club Radnički 1923.

== Club career ==
Born in Požega, Serbia, Ristić is a product of the Mladost Lučani youth football school. In 2014 he started his professional career in Mladost Lučani, the same club where he also graduated, and after that he was sent on multiple loans to Železničar Lajkovac and Sloga Požega. On 14 January 2020 he transferred to Sloga Požega. After two seasons and two played Serbian Cup matches in Sloga Požega, he moved in free transfer in the Serbian First League where he signed for Sloboda Užice.

On 20 June 2020, as a first acquisition for the summer transfer market, Ristić signed a two-year contract with Serbian Super League, Radnički 1923.

On 25 August 2023, in a match against Radnički Niš, he made his official debut in the Serbian SuperLiga. On 18 February 2024, in a match against Vojvodina in the 85th minute he scored his first goal for Radnički 1923 on a home win by the result of 2:1.
