= Dušan Đorđević (footballer, born 1970) =

Serbian football manager and player

Personal information
- Date of birth: 23 April 1970 (age 56)
- Place of birth: Belgrade, SR Serbia, SFR Yugoslavia
- Position: Midfielder

Youth career
- Radnički Beograd

Senior career*
Years	Team	Apps	(Gls)
- Obilić
- Zvezdara
1998–1999	Radnički Niš	7	(0)

Managerial career
- 2015–2017: IMT
- 2017: Bežanija
- 2017–2018: Jedinstvo Surčin
- 2018: Vojvodina (assistant)
- 2018–2019: IMT
- 2019–2020: Čukarički (assistant)
- 2020–2021: Čukarički
- 2021–2022: Radnik Surdulica
- 2022–2023: Napredak Kruševac
- 2023: Serbia U21
- 2024: Radnik Surdulica
- 2025: Spartak Subotica
- * Club domestic league appearances and goals

Dušan Đorđević (Serbian Cyrillic: Душан Ђорђевић; born 23 April 1970) is a Serbian football manager and former player.

== Playing career ==
After starting out at Radnički Beograd, Đorđević played for Obilić in the early 1990s as the club earned promotion to the Second League of FR Yugoslavia. He also made seven appearances for Radnički Niš during the 1998–99 First League of FR Yugoslavia.

== Managerial career ==
After spending two full seasons at IMT, Đorđević was announced as new manager of Serbian First League side Bežanija in June 2017, but left the post after just one game due to problems with his license. He subsequently served as manager of Serbian League Belgrade club Jedinstvo Surčin, before accepting an invitation to join Aleksandar Veselinović as an assistant at Vojvodina in April 2018. By the end of the year, Đorđević returned to IMT as manager.

In May 2019, Đorđević joined Aleksandar Veselinović as an assistant at Serbian SuperLiga side Čukarički. He was installed as the club's manager in September 2020 after the departure of Veselinović to the United Arab Emirates. He lastly took part in the 2021–22 UEFA Europa Conference League qualifying. In September 2021, Đorđević took charge of Radnik Surdulica. He managed to keep them afloat in the Serbian SuperLiga, also not losing to champions Red Star Belgrade, with one win and one draw. He subsequently became manager of Napredak Kruševac in May 2022, but was sacked in February 2023.

On 2 June 2023, Đorđević was appointed as manager of the Serbia national under-21 football team.
