= Kristijan Belić =

Serbian footballer (born 2001)

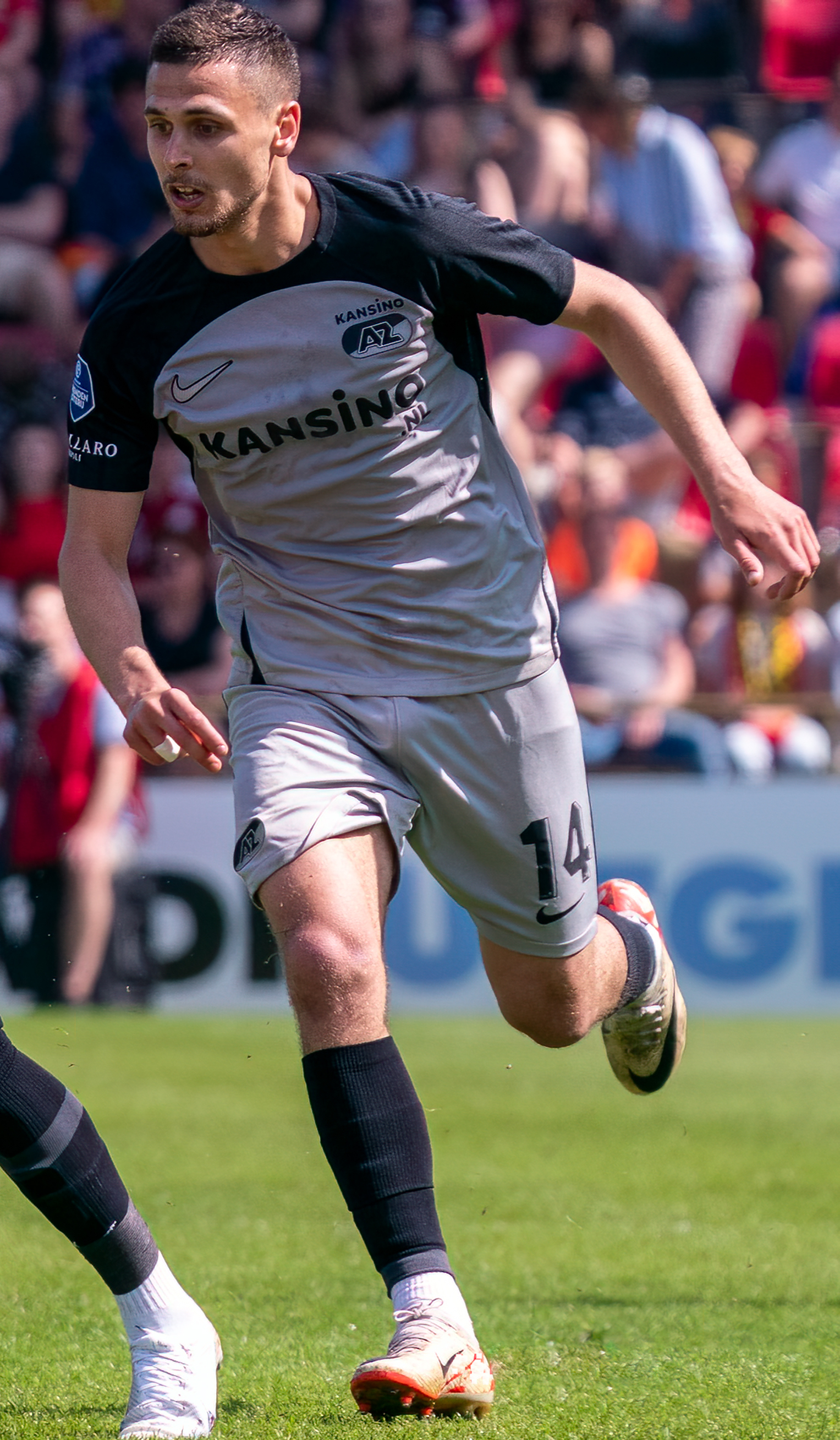
- Belić with AZ in 2024

Personal information
- Date of birth: 25 March 2001 (age 25)
- Place of birth: Sint-Truiden, Belgium
- Height: 1.77 m (5 ft 10 in)
- Position: Defensive midfielder

Team information
- Current team: Maccabi Tel Aviv
- Number: 17

Youth career
- Serbian White Eagles
- OFK Beograd
- 2015–2019: West Ham United
- 2019–2021: Olympiacos

Senior career*
| Years | Team | Apps | (Gls) |
| 2019–2021 | Olympiacos | 0 | (0) |
| 2021–2022 | Čukarički | 13 | (0) |
| 2022–2024 | Partizan | 40 | (3) |
| 2024–2026 | AZ | 29 | (1) |
| 2025–2026 | → Maccabi Tel Aviv (loan) | 17 | (0) |
| 2026– | Maccabi Tel Aviv | | |

International career^{‡}
| 2018 | Serbia U17 | 5 | (1) |
| 2019 | Serbia U19 | 4 | (0) |
| 2022 | Serbia U21 | 2 | (0) |
| 2024– | Serbia | 2 | (0) |
- * Club domestic league appearances and goals as of 23 May 2026 ‡ National team caps and goals as of 8 September 2024

Kristijan Belić (Serbian: Кристијан Белић; born 25 March 2001) is a professional footballer who plays as a defensive midfielder for Israeli Premier League club Maccabi Tel Aviv. Born in Belgium, he represents the Serbia national team.

Belić played youth football in Serbia, England and Greece before beginning his senior career with Olympiacos. He subsequently played for Čukarički and Partizan in Serbia, joining AZ in January 2024. He moved to Maccabi Tel Aviv on loan in August 2025 and completed a permanent transfer in June 2026.

== Early life and youth career ==
Belić was born in Sint-Truiden, Belgium, where his father, former goalkeeper Dušan Belić, was playing professionally. He later trained in the academies of OFK Beograd, West Ham United and Olympiacos. He also trained with the Serbian White Eagles academy in Canada while his father was involved with the club.

== Club career ==
=== Olympiacos ===
Belić joined Olympiacos's youth setup in 2019 and made his senior debut in January 2020. It was his only first-team appearance for the club.

=== Čukarički ===
In 2021, Belić returned to Serbia to join Čukarički. He made thirteen league appearances during the 2021–22 season before moving to Partizan.

=== Partizan ===
Belić joined Partizan ahead of the 2022–23 season. Over the following season and a half, he made 55 appearances in all competitions and scored three goals. His appearances included matches in the UEFA Europa League and UEFA Europa Conference League.

=== AZ ===
On 17 January 2024, Belić signed for AZ on a contract until mid-2028. He made his Eredivisie debut on 20 January in a 2–2 draw against PEC Zwolle.

He scored his only goal for AZ on 14 September 2024 in a 9–1 victory over SC Heerenveen. He made 39 competitive appearances for the club.

=== Maccabi Tel Aviv ===
On 10 August 2025, Belić joined Maccabi Tel Aviv on a season-long loan, with an option to make the transfer permanent. He was assigned the number 17 shirt.

He made seventeen league appearances during the 2025–26 season and was part of the squad that won the Israel State Cup.

On 1 June 2026, Maccabi exercised its purchase option. Belić signed a contract covering the next three seasons, with an option for an additional year.

== International career ==
Belić represented Serbia at under-17, under-19 and under-21 levels.

In August 2024, he received his first senior call-up for Serbia's UEFA Nations League matches against Spain and Denmark.

He made his senior debut on 5 September 2024 in a goalless draw against Spain at the Rajko Mitić Stadium in Belgrade.

== Style of play ==
On signing Belić in January 2024, AZ's director of football Max Huiberts described him as a mobile midfielder who covered considerable ground, was comfortable in possession and brought aggression to challenges.

== Career statistics ==
=== Club ===
League statistics through the end of the 2025–26 season.

League appearances and goals by club and season
| Club | Season | Division | Apps | Goals |
|---|---|---|---|---|
| Olympiacos | 2019–20 | Super League Greece | 0 | 0 |
| Olympiacos | 2020–21 | Super League Greece | 0 | 0 |
| Olympiacos | Total | | 0 | 0 |
| Čukarički | 2021–22 | Serbian SuperLiga | 13 | 0 |
| Partizan | 2022–23 | Serbian SuperLiga | 22 | 1 |
| Partizan | 2023–24 | Serbian SuperLiga | 18 | 2 |
| Partizan | Total | | 40 | 3 |
| AZ | 2023–24 | Eredivisie | 14 | 0 |
| AZ | 2024–25 | Eredivisie | 15 | 1 |
| AZ | Total | | 29 | 1 |
| Maccabi Tel Aviv (loan) | 2025–26 | Israeli Premier League | 17 | 0 |
| Career total | | | 99 | 4 |

=== International ===
As of match played 8 September 2024.

Appearances and goals by national team and year
| National team | Year | Apps | Goals |
|---|---|---|---|
| Serbia | 2024 | 2 | 0 |
| Total | | 2 | 0 |

== Honours ==
Maccabi Tel Aviv

- Israel State Cup: 2025–26

Individual

- Serbian SuperLiga Player of the Round:
  - 2022–23: round 15
