= 2026–27 FK Partizan season =

FK Partizan 80th season

FK Partizan
2026–27 season
- President: Rasim Ljajić
- Head coach: Saša Ilić (until 26 October 2026); Aleksandar Stanojević
- Stadium: Partizan Stadium
Home colours	Away colours	Third colours
- All statistics correct as of 26 May 2026.

The 2026–27 season is Fudbalski klub Partizan's 80th season in existence and the club's 21st competing in the Serbian SuperLiga.

== Transfers ==
=== In ===
Date	Position	Name	From	Type	Ref.
10 June 2026	MF	(Montenegro) Aleks Zeković	(Netherlands) Feyenoord U21	Free Transfer	
18 June 2026	FW	(Ivory Coast) Chaka Traorè	(Italy) Milan	Free Transfer	
18 June 2026	MF	(Serbia) Milan Aleksić	(England) Sunderland	Loan	
18 June 2026	FW	(Austria) Erik Kojzek	(Austria) Wolfsberger AC	Loan	
26 June 2026	FW	(Senegal) Demba Seck	(Italy) Torino	Transfer	
6 July 2026	FW	(Brazil) Jeh	(Turkey) Göztepe	Loan	
7 August 2026	MF	(Ghana) Iddrisu Baba	(Spain) Almería	Free Transfer	
17 August 2026	MF	(Serbia) Igor Miladinović	(France) Saint-Étienne	Loan	
18 August 2026	FW	(Serbia) Nikola Čumić	(Russia) Rubin Kazan	Free Transfer	
3 September 2026	DF	(Brazil) Sidney Lima	(Portugal) Santa Clara	Loan	

=== Out ===
Date	Position	Name	To	Type	Ref.
1 July 2026	MF	(Israel) Bibars Natcho	Retired	End of contract	
1 July 2026	FW	(Montenegro) Andrej Kostić	(Italy) Milan	Transfer	
1 July 2026	GK	(Serbia) Nemanja Stevanović		End of contract	
14 July 2026	DF	(Nigeria) Abdulmalik Mohammed	(Serbia) Teleoptik	Loan	
15 July 2026	DF	(Bosnia and Herzegovina) Nihad Mujakić	(Turkey) Erzurumspor F.K.	Transfer	
15 July 2026	DF	(Serbia) Mihailo Radić	(Spain) Almería B	Loan	
23 July 2026	MF	(Serbia) Vanja Dragojević	(Scotland) Rangers	Transfer	
28 July 2026	MF	(Serbia) Dimitrije Janković	(Serbia) Novi Pazar	Loan	
14 August 2026	MF	(Norway) Ghayas Zahid	(Norway) Vålerenga	Free Transfer	
19 August 2026	DF	(Serbia) Aranđel Stojković	(Serbia) TSC	Free Transfer	
27 August 2026	FW	(Germany) Sebastian Polter	(Germany) SV Wilhelmshaven	End of contract	
28 August 2026	DF	(Serbia) Ivan Vasiljević	(Spain) Getafe B	Free Transfer	
29 August 2026	MF	(Serbia) Ognjen Ugrešić	(Greece) PAOK	Transfer	
3 September 2026	DF	(Montenegro) Milan Roganović	(Belgium) Genk	Transfer	
16 September 2026	MF	(Serbia) Saša Zdjelar	(Armenia) Noah	Free Transfer	
17 September 2026	DF	(Serbia) Marko Živković	(Serbia) Loznica	Free Transfer	

== Players ==
=== Squad ===
No.	Name	Nationality	Position (s)	Date of Birth (Age)	Signed from	Notes
Goalkeepers
1	Marko Milošević	(Serbia)	GK	7 February 1991 (age 35)	(Serbia) Radnički 1923	
31	Miloš Krunić	(Serbia)	GK	22 November 1996 (age 30)	(Saudi Arabia) Hajer	
41	Tarik Banjić	(Bosnia and Herzegovina)	GK	2 February 2008 (age 18)	Youth system	
Defenders
4	Mario Jurčević	(Slovenia)	LB	1 June 1995 (age 31)	(Cyprus) Apollon Limassol	
5	Mateja Milovanović	(Serbia)	CB	18 April 2004 (age 22)	(Netherlands) Heerenveen	
20	Samson Nwulu	(Nigeria)	RB	28 March 2007 (age 19)	(Nigeria) Fima	
21	Sidney Lima	(Brazil)	CB	17 January 1997 (age 29)	(Portugal) Santa Clara	Loan
23	Stefan Mitrović	(Serbia)	CB	22 May 1990 (age 36)	(Belgium) KAA Gent	
24	Vukašin Đurđević	(Serbia)	RB	24 January 2004 (age 22)	(Serbia) Voždovac	
33	Stefan Petrović	(Serbia)	LB	1 March 2008 (age 18)	Youth system	
40	Nikola Simić	(Serbia)	CB	30 March 2007 (age 19)	Youth system	Captain
44	Stefan Milić	(Montenegro)	CB	6 July 2000 (age 26)	(Russia) Chernomorets	
50	Milan Lazarević	(Serbia)	RB	10 January 1997 (age 29)	(Serbia) Vojvodina	
66	Vojin Marinković	(Serbia)	CB	14 February 2009 (age 17)	Youth system	
Midfielders
8	Aleks Zeković	(Montenegro)	CM	16 January 2006 (age 20)	(Netherlands) Feyenoord	
10	Igor Miladinović	(Serbia)	AM	8 June 2003 (age 23)	(France) AS Saint-Étienne	Loan
11	Milan Vukotić	(Montenegro)	AM	5 October 2002 (age 24)	(Montenegro) Budućnost Podgorica	
14	Iddrisu Baba	(Ghana)	DM	22 January 1996 (age 30)	(Spain) Almería	
17	Milan Aleksić	(Serbia)	AM	30 August 2005 (age 21)	(England) Sunderland	Loan
88	Dušan Makević	(Serbia)	DM	30 April 2007 (age 19)	Youth system	
90	Zoran Alilović	(Serbia)	AM	14 March 2006 (age 20)	Youth system	
Forwards
7	Chaka Traorè	(Ivory Coast)	LW	23 December 2004 (age 21)	(Italy) Milan	
9	Erik Kojzek	(Austria)	CF	2 January 2006 (age 20)	(Austria) Wolfsberger	Loan
19	Demba Seck	(Senegal)	RW	10 February 2001 (age 25)	(Italy) Torino	
27	Nikola Čumić	(Serbia)	RW	20 November 1998 (age 28)	(Russia) Rubin Kazan	
32	Nemanja Trifunović	(Serbia)	LW	29 June 2004 (age 22)	Youth system	
39	Ibrahim Zubairu	(Ghana)	LW	2 June 2004 (age 22)	(Serbia) Jedinstvo Ub	
42	Matija Ninić	(Serbia)	RW	13 March 2006 (age 20)	Youth system	
46	Marko Lekić	(Serbia)	CF	3 August 2003 (age 23)	Youth system	
79	Dušan Jovanović	(Serbia)	LW	7 February 2008 (age 18)	Youth system	
89	Jeh	(Brazil)	ST	24 October 1999 (age 27)	(Turkey) Göztepe	Loan
99	Bogdan Kostić	(Serbia)	ST	17 January 2007 (age 19)	Youth system	

== Friendlies ==
29 June 2026 Friendly	Partizan (Serbia)	0–3	(Bulgaria) CSKA 1948	Beltinci, Slovenia
18:00		Report	Diallo 35'; Rusev 56'; Iliev 90+1'	Stadium: Beltinci Sports Park

2 July 2026 Friendly	Partizan (Serbia)	2–1	(Slovenia) Aluminij	Kidričevo, Slovenia
18:00	Kojzek 6' (pen.); Lekić 80'	Report	Bloudek 77'	Stadium: Aluminij Sports Park

6 July 2026 Friendly	Partizan (Serbia)	1–0	(Azerbaijan) Neftçi	Ormož, Slovenia
17:30	Kojzek 48'	Report		Stadium: Športni park Mestna Graba

10 July 2026 Friendly	Partizan (Serbia)	2–2	(Croatia) Lokomotiva Zagreb	Kidričevo, Slovenia
18:00	Seck 66'; Ninić 90+1'	Report	Lorber 37'; Đurković 77' (pen.)	Stadium: Aluminij Sports Park

11 July 2026 Friendly	Partizan (Serbia)	4–1	(Slovenia) Nafta 1903	Lendava, Slovenia
17:30	Zubairu 18', 52', 55'; Kostić 77'	Report	Brumec 72'	Stadium: Lendava Sports Park

27 September 2026 Friendly	Partizan (Serbia)	2–3	(Russia) Rodina Moscow	Belgrade, Serbia
15:00	Zubairu 42'; Jeh 54'	Report	Timoshenko 35'; Milovanović 58' (o.g.); Cissoko 78'	Stadium: SC Partizan-Teleoptik

3 October 2026 Friendly	Borac Starčevo (Serbia)	1–5	(Serbia) Partizan	Starčevo, Serbia
15:00	Cetić 70'	Report	Zubairu 8', 88'; Jeh 40'; Lima 83'; Čumić 90'	Stadium: Borac Stadium; Attendance: 1,200

14 November 2026 Friendly	PAOK (Greece)	3–1	(Serbia) Partizan	Thessaloniki, Greece
15:45	Kenny 15'; Santamaria 47'; Camara 79'	Report	Seck 6'	Stadium: Toumba Stadium

== Competitions ==
=== Overview ===
Competition	Record							
Competition	P	W	D	L	GF	GA	GD	Win %
Serbian SuperLiga	16	5	2	9	26	28	−2	31.25
Serbian Cup	1	1	0	0	5	1	+4	100.00
Conference League	6	5	0	1	13	5	+8	83.33
Total	23	11	2	10	44	34	+10	47.83

==== Results by matchday ====
Round	1	2	3	4	5	6	7	8	9	10	11	12	13	14	15	16
Ground	A	A	H	A	H	A	H	A	H	A	H	A	H	H	H	A
Result	D	W	L	W	L	L	W	L	L	D	W	L	L	W	L	L
Position	7	3	5	7	11	12	11	12	13	11	10	10	10	9	10	

Updated to match(es) played on 8 November 2026. Source: Partizan
A = Away; H = Home; W = Win; D = Draw; L = Loss

=== Results ===
18 July 2026 1	Zemun	2–2	Partizan	Ub
20:00	Jokić (yellow card) 27'; Bakić (yellow card) 33'; Petrović 57'; Ilić (yellow card) 67'; Petrušić 90+3' (yellow card) 90+4'	Report	Aleksić 19'; Ugrešić 78' (yellow card) 85'; Zubairu (yellow card) 83'	Stadium: Stadium Dragan Džajić; Referee: (Serbia) Stanko Ostraćanin

26 July 2026 2	Mačva Šabac	1–3	Partizan	Šabac
21:00	Abdullahi (yellow card) 15'; Stevanović (yellow card) 30'; Terzić (yellow card) 37'; Tojčić (yellow card) 37'; Vraštanović (red card) 53'; Vidakov 59'; Ristivojević (yellow card) 79'; Pejović (yellow card) 90+3'	Report	Zubairu 10'; Jeh (yellow card) 22'; Trifunović (yellow card) 43'; Seck 87' (red card) 90+3'; Traorè 90+4' (yellow card) 90+1'; Vukotić (yellow card) 90+3'	Stadium: FK Mačva Stadium; Referee: (Serbia) Lazar Lukić

2 August 2026 3	Partizan	1–2	IMT	Belgrade
20:00	Zeković (red card) 16'; Đurđević (yellow card) 16'; Vukotić 89'	Report	Luković (yellow card) 35'; Žagar 52'; Tiendrébéogo (yellow card) 77'; Martos (yellow card) 90'; Lebi 90+2'	Stadium: Partizan Stadium; Referee: (Serbia) Miloš Milanović

28 October 2026* 4	Radnički Niš	2–3	Partizan	Niš
17:00	Jovanović 47'; Mustapha (yellow card) 56'; Ivanović 74'; Rošević (yellow card) 77'; Jokić (yellow card) 79'; Kanouté (yellow card) 89'	Report	Jeh 31'; Milić 39'; Čumić 67'	Stadium: Čair Stadium; Referee: (Serbia) Novak Simović

16 August 2026 5	Partizan	0–1	Radnički 1923	Belgrade
21:00	Baba (yellow card) 16'; Milić (yellow card) 90+4'	Report	Babić (yellow card) 24'; Hilu (red card) 34'; Sremčević 45+1'; Marjanović (yellow card) 49'	Stadium: Partizan Stadium; Referee: (Serbia) Danilo Nikolić

23 August 2026 6	Mladost Lučani	3–1	Partizan	Lučani
21:00	Tashovski 12' (yellow card) 45'; Todosijević 36'; Varjačić (yellow card) 56'; Ćirković 69'	Report	Nwulu (yellow card) 11'; Seck 84'	Stadium: Mladost Stadium; Referee: (Serbia) Novak Simović

31 August 2026 7	Partizan	3–1	OFK Beograd	Belgrade
19:00	Miladinović 37'; Aleksić 55'; Kostić 67'; Zeković (yellow card) 84'; Vukotić (yellow card) 87'	Report	Silué 72' (yellow card) 56'; Aderoju (yellow card) 80'	Stadium: Partizan Stadium; Referee: (Serbia) Andrija Stojanović

6 September 2026 8	Red Star Belgrade	2–1	Partizan	Belgrade
19:00	Dieng 17'; Ivanić 28' (pen.); Luckassen (yellow card) 45+2'; Krunić (yellow card) 52'; Elšnik (yellow card) 58'; Cham (yellow card) 83'; Gudelj (yellow card) 90+4'; Bajo (yellow card) 90+6'	Report	Jeh 1'; Seck (yellow card) 44'; Milić (yellow card) 45+3'; Aleksić (yellow card) 85'; Zeković (yellow card) 90+6'	Stadium: Rajko Mitić Stadium; Referee: (Serbia) Nenad Minaković

13 September 2026 9	Partizan	2–3	Vojvodina	Belgrade
17:00	Milić (yellow card) 18'; Zubairu (yellow card) 23'; Aleksić (yellow card) 36'; Nwulu (yellow card) 48'; Kojzek 68', 90+2'; Lekić (yellow card) 90+6'; Seck (yellow card) 90+6'	Report	Zukić (yellow card) 9'; Kolarević 17', 34' (yellow card) 18'; Mulahusejnović (yellow card) 29'; Nikolić (yellow card) 42'; Vukanović (yellow card) 73'; Ranđelović 78'; Barros (yellow card) 86'; Đakovac (yellow card) 90+6'	Stadium: Partizan Stadium; Referee: (Serbia) Pavle Ilić

19 September 2026 10	Radnik Surdulica	4–4	Partizan	Surdulica
19:00	Bogdanović (yellow card) 4' (goal) 37', 65'; Quarshie 27'; Lazić 45+2'; Stojanović (yellow card) 68'; Novaković (yellow card) 72'; Abubakar (yellow card) 85'	Report	Kojzek 18'; Nwulu (yellow card) 28'; Vukotić (yellow card) 35' (red card); Miladinović (yellow card) 42'; Radojičić 54' (o.g.); Simić 58'; Lima 73'; Mitrović (yellow card) 73'; Zeković (yellow card) 90+2'	Stadium: Surdulica City Stadium; Referee: (Serbia) Srđan Jovanović

11 October 2026 11	Partizan	1–0	Novi Pazar	Belgrade
17:00	Jeh 81'; Seck (yellow card) 89'	Report	Miljković (yellow card) 64'	Stadium: Partizan Stadium; Referee: (Serbia) Miloš Milanović

18 October 2026 12	Železničar Pančevo	1–0	Partizan	Pančevo
18:30	Ankeye 13' (yellow card) 63'; Đuričić (yellow card) 41'; Jovanović (yellow card) 44'; Milikić (yellow card) 61'; Jevremović (yellow card) 85'; Sbai (yellow card) 90+5'	Report	Trifunović (yellow card) 42'; Aleksić (yellow card) 53'; Jeh (yellow card) 61'; Jurčević (red card) 73'	Stadium: SC Mladost Stadium; Referee: (Serbia) Stefan Jeknić

24 October 2026 13	Partizan	0–2	Čukarički	Belgrade
16:00	Jeh (yellow card) 71'	Report	Đoković 34', 45+2'; Miladinović (yellow card) 49'; Stanković (yellow card) 54'; Prokopijević (yellow card) 68'; Sissoko (yellow card) 80'	Stadium: Partizan Stadium; Referee: (Serbia) Stanko Ostraćanin

1 November 2026 14	Partizan	3–0	Zemun	Belgrade
17:00	Seck 30'; Jurčević 47'; Vukotić 74'	Report	Dovedan (yellow card) 19'; Ikoba (red card) 89'	Stadium: Partizan Stadium; Referee: (Serbia) Lazar Lukić

8 November 2026 15	Partizan	1–2	Mačva Šabac	Belgrade
17:00	Zubairu 16'; Simić (yellow card) 30'; Vukotić (yellow card) 75'; Milić (yellow card) 84'	Report	Đurić 8' (yellow card) 69'; Pejović (yellow card) 21'; Knežević 36'; Stevanović (yellow card) 40'; Terzić (yellow card) 83'	Stadium: Partizan Stadium; Referee: (Serbia) Milan Ilić

22 November 2026 16	IMT	2–1	Partizan	Loznica
15:00		Report		Stadium: Lagator Stadium; Referee: (Serbia) Milan Mitić

=== Serbian Cup ===
4 November 2026 Round of 32	Budućnost Krušik 2014	1–5	Partizan	Valjevo
13:00	Aleksić 4' (yellow card) 56'; Jović (yellow card) 51'; Pajović (yellow card) 54'; Cmiljanović (yellow card) 62'	Report	Jeh 52'; Zubairu 53'; Nwulu (yellow card) 56'; Kojzek 57'; Mitrović 67'; Lekić (yellow card) 80'; Čumić 90+1'	Stadium: Stadion Park Pećina; Referee: (Serbia) Andrija Stojanović

=== UEFA Conference League ===
==== Second qualifying round ====
23 July 2026 First leg	Partizan (Serbia)	4–0	(Luxembourg) UNA Strassen	Belgrade, Serbia
21:00	Kojzek 5'; Zubairu 29', 68'; Zeković (yellow card) 60'; Ugrešić 80'	Report	Steinmetz (yellow card) 26'; Agović (red card) 51'	Stadium: Partizan Stadium; Attendance: 10,637; Referee: (Kazakhstan) Daniyar Sakhi

30 July 2026 Second leg	UNA Strassen (Luxembourg)	0–1 (0–5 agg.)	(Serbia) Partizan	Luxembourg City, Luxembourg
20:15	Rastoder (yellow card) 54'; Dadashev (yellow card) 79'	Report	Kostić 48'	Stadium: Stade Achille Hammerel; Attendance: 2,283; Referee: (Republic of Ireland) Ben McMaster

==== Third qualifying round ====
6 August 2026 First leg	Partizan (Serbia)	3–0	(Kazakhstan) Tobol	Belgrade, Serbia
21:00	Aleksić (yellow card) 3'; Seck 32'; Aleksić (yellow card) 44'; Zubairu 64'; Traorè 90+4'; Đurđević (yellow card) 90+8'; Lekić (yellow card) 90+9'	Report	Cissé (yellow card) 86'; Myakish (yellow card) 90+1'	Stadium: Partizan Stadium; Attendance: 10,367; Referee: (Portugal) António Nobre

13 August 2026 Second leg	Tobol (Kazakhstan)	1–2 (1–5 agg.)	(Serbia) Partizan	Kostanay, Kazakhstan
17:00	Chesnokov 7'; Cissé (yellow card) 90+2'	Report	Alilović (yellow card) 40'; Trifunović (yellow card) 44'; Mitrović 47'; Milić (yellow card) 62'; Nwulu (yellow card) 85'; Traorè 90+2'	Stadium: Kostanay Central Stadium; Attendance: 6,129; Referee: (Italy) Daniele Chiffi

==== Play-off round ====
20 August 2026 First leg	Getafe (Spain)	3–1	(Serbia) Partizan	Madrid, Spain
21:00	Ünal 10'; Abqar (yellow card) 39' (red card); Femenía (yellow card) 76'; García 87'; Mojica 90'; Mayoral (yellow card) 90+1'	Report	Seck 43'; Roganović (yellow card) 55'	Stadium: Coliseum Stadium; Attendance: 4,968; Referee: (Latvia) Andris Treimanis

27 August 2026 Second leg	Partizan (Serbia)	2–1 (3–4 agg.)	(Spain) Getafe	Belgrade, Serbia
21:00	Jeh 53'; Vukotić (yellow card) 57'; Kojzek 76'	Report	Sazonov (yellow card) 21'; Satriano (yellow card) 33'; Mangala (yellow card) 48'; Romero (yellow card) 58'; Ünal 69'; Mayoral (yellow card) 90+2'	Stadium: Partizan Stadium; Attendance: 28,247; Referee: (Switzerland) Urs Schnyder

== Statistics ==
=== Squad statistics ===
No.	Pos	Nat	Player	Total		SuperLiga		Cup		Europe	
No.	Pos	Nat	Player	Apps	Goals	Apps	Goals	Apps	Goals	Apps	Goals
Goalkeepers
1	GK	(Serbia) SRB	Marko Milošević	9	0	8	0	0	0	1	0
12	GK	(Serbia) SRB	Veljko Popović	0	0	0	0	0	0	0	0
31	GK	(Serbia) SRB	Miloš Krunić	13	0	7	0	1	0	5	0
41	GK	(Bosnia and Herzegovina) BIH	Tarik Banjić	0	0	0	0	0	0	0	0
Defenders
4	DF	(Slovenia) SLO	Mario Jurčević	5	1	5	1	0	0	0	0
5	DF	(Serbia) SRB	Mateja Milovanović	9	0	7	0	1	0	1	0
20	DF	(Nigeria) NGR	Samson Nwulu	18	0	12	0	1	0	5	0
21	DF	(Brazil) BRA	Sidney Lima	7	1	6	1	1	0	0	0
23	DF	(Serbia) SRB	Stefan Mitrović	9	2	3	0	1	1	5	1
24	DF	(Serbia) SRB	Vukašin Đurđević	10	0	5	0	1	0	4	0
33	DF	(Serbia) SRB	Stefan Petrović	7	0	6	0	0	0	1	0
40	DF	(Serbia) SRB	Nikola Simić	17	1	13	1	0	0	4	0
44	DF	(Montenegro) MNE	Stefan Milić	15	1	10	1	0	0	5	0
50	DF	(Serbia) SRB	Milan Lazarević	0	0	0	0	0	0	0	0
66	DF	(Serbia) SRB	Vojin Marinković	1	0	0	0	0	0	1	0
Midfielders
8	MF	(Montenegro) MNE	Aleks Zeković	14	0	9	0	1	0	4	0
10	MF	(Serbia) SRB	Igor Miladinović	13	1	11	1	0	0	2	0
11	MF	(Montenegro) MNE	Milan Vukotić	17	2	11	2	1	0	5	0
14	MF	(Ghana) GHA	Iddrisu Baba	14	0	11	0	1	0	2	0
17	MF	(Serbia) SRB	Milan Aleksić	20	2	15	2	0	0	5	0
88	MF	(Serbia) SRB	Dušan Makević	0	0	0	0	0	0	0	0
90	MF	(Serbia) SRB	Zoran Alilović	3	0	1	0	0	0	2	0
99	MF	(Serbia) SRB	Bogdan Kostić	18	2	12	1	1	0	5	1
Forwards
7	FW	(Ivory Coast) CIV	Chaka Traorè	11	3	6	1	0	0	5	2
9	FW	(Austria) AUT	Erik Kojzek	21	6	14	3	1	1	6	2
19	FW	(Senegal) SEN	Demba Seck	16	5	10	3	0	0	6	2
27	FW	(Serbia) SRB	Nikola Čumić	13	2	10	1	1	1	2	0
32	FW	(Serbia) SRB	Nemanja Trifunović	11	0	8	0	0	0	3	0
39	FW	(Ghana) GHA	Ibrahim Zubairu	17	6	13	2	1	1	3	3
42	FW	(Serbia) SRB	Matija Ninić	1	0	0	0	0	0	1	0
46	FW	(Serbia) SRB	Marko Lekić	5	0	2	0	1	0	2	0
77	FW	(Serbia) SRB	Ivan Martinović	0	0	0	0	0	0	0	0
79	FW	(Serbia) SRB	Dušan Jovanović	1	0	1	0	0	0	0	0
89	FW	(Brazil) BRA	Jeh	19	5	14	3	1	1	4	1
Players transferred out during the season
6	MF	(Serbia) SRB	Vanja Dragojević	0	0	0	0	0	0	0	0
26	DF	(Serbia) SRB	Mihailo Radić	0	0	0	0	0	0	0	0
30	DF	(Montenegro) MNE	Milan Roganović	10	0	5	0	0	0	5	0
36	MF	(Serbia) SRB	Ognjen Ugrešić	7	2	5	1	0	0	2	1
70	MF	(Serbia) SRB	Dimitrije Janković	0	0	0	0	0	0	0	0

Last updated: 8 November 2026
Source: Competitions

=== Goal scorers ===
Rank	No.	Pos	Nat	Name	SuperLiga	Serbian Cup	Europe	Total
1	36	FW	(Austria)	Erik Kojzek	3	1	2	6
1	17	FW	(Ghana)	Ibrahim Zubairu	2	1	3	6
2	19	FW	(Senegal)	Demba Seck	3	0	2	5
2	23	FW	(Brazil)	Jeh	3	1	1	5
3	7	FW	(Ivory Coast)	Chaka Traorè	1	0	2	3
4	36	MF	(Serbia)	Ognjen Ugrešić	1	0	1	2
4	17	MF	(Serbia)	Milan Aleksić	2	0	0	2
4	7	MF	(Serbia)	Bogdan Kostić	1	0	1	2
4	11	MF	(Montenegro)	Milan Vukotić	2	0	0	2
4	23	DF	(Serbia)	Stefan Mitrović	0	1	1	2
4	27	FW	(Serbia)	Nikola Čumić	1	1	0	2
5	10	MF	(Serbia)	Igor Miladinović	1	0	0	1
5	40	DF	(Serbia)	Nikola Simić	1	0	0	1
5	21	DF	(Brazil)	Sidney Lima	1	0	0	1
5	44	DF	(Montenegro)	Stefan Milić	1	0	0	1
5	4	DF	(Slovenia)	Mario Jurčević	1	0	0	1
5				Own goal	1	0	0	1
Totals					25	5	13	43

Last updated: 8 November 2026

=== Disciplinary record ===
Number	Nation	Position	Name	SuperLiga		Serbian Cup		Europe		Total	
Number	Nation	Position	Name	Yellow card	Red card	Yellow card	Red card	Yellow card	Red card	Yellow card	Red card
4	(Slovenia)	DF	Mario Jurčević	0	1	0	0	0	0	0	1
7	(Ivory Coast)	FW	Chaka Traorè	1	0	0	0	0	0	1	0
8	(Montenegro)	MF	Aleks Zeković	3	1	0	0	1	0	4	1
10	(Serbia)	MF	Igor Miladinović	1	0	0	0	0	0	1	0
11	(Montenegro)	MF	Milan Vukotić	4	1	0	0	2	0	6	1
14	(Ghana)	MF	Iddrisu Baba	1	0	0	0	0	0	1	0
17	(Serbia)	MF	Milan Aleksić	3	0	0	0	1	0	4	0
19	(Senegal)	FW	Demba Seck	3	1	0	0	0	0	3	1
20	(Nigeria)	DF	Samson Nwulu	3	0	1	0	1	0	5	0
23	(Serbia)	DF	Stefan Mitrović	1	0	0	0	0	0	1	0
24	(Serbia)	DF	Vukašin Đurđević	1	0	0	0	1	0	2	0
30	(Montenegro)	DF	Milan Roganović	0	0	0	0	1	0	1	0
32	(Serbia)	FW	Nemanja Trifunović	2	0	0	0	1	0	3	0
36	(Serbia)	MF	Ognjen Ugrešić	1	0	0	0	0	0	1	0
39	(Ghana)	FW	Ibrahim Zubairu	2	0	0	0	0	0	2	0
40	(Serbia)	DF	Nikola Simić	1	0	0	0	0	0	1	0
44	(Montenegro)	DF	Stefan Milić	4	0	0	0	1	0	5	0
46	(Serbia)	FW	Marko Lekić	1	0	1	0	1	0	3	0
89	(Brazil)	FW	Jeh	3	0	0	0	0	0	3	0
90	(Serbia)	MF	Zoran Alilović	0	0	0	0	1	0	1	0
			TOTALS	34	4	2	0	11	0	47	4

Last updated: 8 November 2026

=== Clean sheets ===
Rank	No.	Pos	Nat	Name	SuperLiga	Serbian Cup	Europe	Total
1	31	GK	(Serbia)	Miloš Krunić	0	0	3	3
2	1	GK	(Serbia)	Marko Milošević	2	0	0	2
Totals					2	0	3	5

Last updated: 1 November 2026

=== Games as captain ===
Rank	No.	Pos	Nat	Name	SuperLiga	Serbian Cup	Europe	Total
1	40	DF	(Serbia)	Nikola Simić	11	0	3	14
2	36	MF	(Serbia)	Ognjen Ugrešić	3	0	2	5
3	11	MF	(Montenegro)	Milan Vukotić	1	1	1	3
Totals					15	1	6	22

Last updated: 8 November 2026
