= 2024–25 FK Partizan season =

FK Partizan 78th season

FK Partizan
2024–25 season
- President: Rasim Ljajić
- Head coach: Aleksandar Stanojević (until 27 September 2024); Savo Milošević (until 2 December 2024); Marko Jovanović (until 1 January 2025); Srđan Blagojević
- Stadium: Partizan Stadium
- Serbian SuperLiga: 2nd
- Serbian Cup: Quarter-finals
- UEFA Champions League: Second qualifying round
- UEFA Europa League: Third qualifying round
- UEFA Conference League: Play-off round
- Top goalscorer: League: Bibars Natcho (15); All: Bibars Natcho (15)
- Average home league attendance: 3,751
Home colours	Away colours	Third colours
- All statistics correct as of 26 May 2025.

The 2024–25 season is Fudbalski Klub Partizan's 78th season in existence and the club's 19th competing in the Serbian SuperLiga.

== Transfers ==
=== In ===
Date	Position	Name	From	Type	Ref.
7 June 2024	FW	(Serbia) Đorđe Jovanović	(Switzerland) Basel	Loan	
24 June 2024	DF	(Bosnia and Herzegovina) Nihad Mujakić	(Turkey) Ankaragücü	Transfer	
27 June 2024	MF	(Honduras) Kervin Arriaga	(United States) Minnesota United	Transfer	
28 June 2024	FW	(Ghana) Ibrahim Zubairu	(Serbia) Jedinstvo Ub	Transfer	
2 July 2024	DF	(Slovenia) Mario Jurčević	(Cyprus) Apollon Limassol	Free Transfer	
15 July 2024	DF	(Serbia) Milan Lazarević	(Serbia) Vojvodina	Free Transfer	
15 July 2024	DF	(Serbia) Vukašin Đurđević	(Serbia) Voždovac	Free Transfer	
31 July 2024	FW	(Peru) Joao Grimaldo	(Peru) Sporting Cristal	Transfer	
15 August 2024	MF	(Bosnia and Herzegovina) Stefan Kovač	(Serbia) Čukarički	Transfer	
12 September 2024	DF	(Serbia) Mihajlo Ilić	(Italy) Bologna	Loan	
13 September 2024	MF	(Senegal) Pape Fuhrer	(France) Olympique Lyonnais B	Free Transfer	
14 September 2024	DF	(Serbia) Marko Kerkez	(Serbia) Spartak Subotica	Transfer	
8 January 2025	MF	(Montenegro) Milan Vukotić	(Montenegro) Budućnost Podgorica	Transfer	
16 January 2025	FW	(Serbia) Jovan Milošević	(Germany) VfB Stuttgart	Loan	
7 February 2025	DF	(North Macedonia) Bojan Dimoski	(Russia) Akron Tolyatti	Loan	

=== Out ===
Date	Position	Name	To	Type	Ref.
12 June 2024	MF	(Serbia) Danilo Pantić	(Slovakia) Spartak Trnava	Free Transfer	
26 June 2024	MF	(Ecuador) Denil Castillo	(Ukraine) Shakhtar Donetsk	Loan Return	
28 June 2024	DF	(Serbia) Nikola Miličić	(Serbia) Napredak Kruševac	Loan	
29 June 2024	MF	(Serbia) Bogdan Mirčetić	(Serbia) Radnički 1923	Transfer	
2 July 2024	MF	(Serbia) Mihajlo Petković	(Serbia) Napredak Kruševac	Free Transfer	
3 July 2024	DF	(Serbia) Aranđel Stojković	(Hungary) Debreceni VSC	Loan	
16 July 2024	GK	(Serbia) Vukašin Jovanović	(Serbia) Jedinstvo Ub	Loan	
17 July 2024	FW	(Serbia) Samed Baždar	(Spain) Real Zaragoza	Transfer	
24 July 2024	DF	(Bosnia and Herzegovina) Siniša Saničanin	(Hungary) Diósgyőri VTK	Free Transfer	
31 July 2024	FW	(Serbia) Andrija Pavlović	(Montenegro) Budućnost Podgorica	Free Transfer	
16 August 2024	FW	(Serbia) Nikola Lakčević	(Serbia) Prva iskra Barič	Free Transfer	
16 August 2024	GK	(Serbia) Vanja Radulaški	(Serbia) Voždovac U19	Free Transfer	
26 August 2024	DF	(Serbia) Bojan Kovačević	(Spain) Cádiz	Loan	
26 August 2024	FW	(Serbia) Janko Jevremović	(Serbia) Železničar Pančevo	Free Transfer	
30 August 2024	DF	(Serbia) Svetozar Marković	(Czech Republic) Viktoria Plzeň	Transfer	
3 September 2024	FW	(Brazil) Matheus Saldanha	(Hungary) Ferencváros	Transfer	
4 September 2024	FW	(Serbia) Aleksa Janković	(Serbia) Radnički 1923	Free Transfer	
13 September 2024	FW	(Serbia) Dušan Jovanović	(Serbia) Teleoptik	Dual registration	
13 September 2024	FW	(Serbia) Nemanja Trifunović	(Serbia) Teleoptik	Dual registration	
13 September 2024	DF	(Montenegro) Milan Roganović	(Serbia) Teleoptik	Dual registration	
13 September 2024	MF	(Serbia) Mihajlo Petrović	(Serbia) Teleoptik	Dual registration	
15 September 2024	FW	(Curaçao) Xander Severina	(Israel) Maccabi Haifa	Transfer	
1 January 2025	MF	(Senegal) Franck Kanouté		End of contract	
9 January 2025	MF	(Honduras) Kervin Arriaga	(Spain) Real Zaragoza	Loan	
28 January 2025	DF	(Serbia) Marko Kerkez	(Greece) Aris Thessaloniki	Loan	
3 February 2025	DF	(Serbia) Nikola Miličić	(Spain) Burgos	Free Transfer	
7 February 2025	FW	(Peru) Joao Grimaldo	(Latvia) Riga	Loan	
8 February 2025	DF	(Serbia) Nikola Antić	(Kazakhstan) Ordabasy	Free Transfer	
13 February 2025	MF	(Ghana) Leonard Owusu	(Norway) Fredrikstad	Loan	

== Players ==
=== Squad ===
No.	Name	Nationality	Position (s)	Date of Birth (Age)	Signed from	Notes
Goalkeepers
1	Aleksandar Jovanović	(Serbia) (Montenegro)	GK	6 December 1992 (age 33)	(Cyprus) Apollon Limassol	Captain
31	Miloš Krunić	(Serbia)	GK	22 November 1996 (age 29)	(Saudi Arabia) Hajer	
85	Nemanja Stevanović	(Serbia)	GK	8 May 1992 (age 33)	(Serbia) Čukarički	
Defenders
3	Mihajlo Ilić	(Serbia)	CB	4 July 2003 (age 22)	(Italy) Bologna	Loan
4	Mario Jurčević	(Slovenia)	LB	1 June 1995 (age 30)	(Cyprus) Apollon Limassol	
12	Zlatan Šehović	(Serbia)	LB	8 August 2000 (age 25)	(Israel) Maccabi Netanya	
17	Marko Živković	(Serbia)	RB	17 May 1994 (age 31)	(Serbia) Voždovac	
18	Nihad Mujakić	(Bosnia and Herzegovina)	CB	15 April 1998 (age 27)	(Turkey) Ankaragücü	
21	Bojan Dimoski	(North Macedonia)	LB	23 November 2001 (age 24)	(Russia) Akron Tolyatti	Loan
24	Vukašin Đurđević	(Serbia)	RB	24 January 2004 (age 22)	(Serbia) Voždovac	
25	Nathan de Medina	(Belgium) (Democratic Republic of the Congo)	CB	8 October 1997 (age 28)	(Germany) Eintracht Braunschweig	
26	Aleksandar Filipović	(Serbia)	LB	20 December 1994 (age 31)	(Belarus) Bate Borisov	
30	Milan Roganović	(Serbia) (Montenegro)	RB	28 October 2005 (age 20)	Youth system	
40	Nikola Simić	(Serbia)	CB	30 March 2007 (age 18)	Youth system	
50	Milan Lazarević	(Serbia) (Bosnia and Herzegovina)	RB	10 January 1997 (age 29)	(Serbia) Vojvodina	
Midfielders
10	Bibras Natkho	(Israel) (Serbia)	CM	18 February 1988 (age 38)	(Greece) Olympiacos	Vice-captain
11	Milan Vukotić	(Montenegro)	AM	5 October 2002 (age 23)	(Montenegro) Budućnost Podgorica	
14	Stefan Kovač	(Bosnia and Herzegovina) (Serbia)	CM	14 June 1999 (age 26)	(Serbia) Čukarički	
19	Aleksandar Šćekić	(Montenegro) (Serbia)	DM	12 December 1991 (age 34)	(Israel) Hapoel Haifa	
27	Pape Fuhrer	(Senegal)	MF	23 December 2005 (age 20)	(France) Olympique Lyonnais B	
29	Ghayas Zahid	(Norway) (Pakistan)	MF	8 September 1994 (age 31)	(Turkey) Ankaragücü	
36	Ognjen Ugrešić	(Serbia) (Hungary)	CM	15 July 2006 (age 19)	Youth system	
45	Mateja Stjepanović	(Serbia)	DM	20 February 2004 (age 22)	Youth system	
70	Dimitrije Janković	(Serbia)	CM	27 February 2006 (age 20)	Youth system	
77	Goh Young-jun	(South Korea)	MF	9 July 2001 (age 24)	(South Korea) Pohang Steelers	
78	Mihajlo Petrović	(Serbia) (Bosnia and Herzegovina)	MF	21 September 2005 (age 20)	Youth system	
80	Vanja Dragojević	(Serbia)	DM	11 January 2006 (age 20)	Youth system	
90	Zoran Alilović	(Serbia)	MF	14 June 2006 (age 19)	Youth system	
Forwards
7	Đorđe Jovanović	(Serbia)	CF	15 February 1999 (age 27)	(Switzerland) Basel	Loan
9	Jovan Milošević	(Serbia)	CF	31 July 2005 (age 20)	(Germany) VfB Stuttgart	Loan
15	Aldo Kalulu	(Democratic Republic of the Congo) (France)	LW	21 January 1996 (age 30)	(France) Sochaux	
23	Nemanja Nikolić	(Serbia)	CF	19 October 1992 (age 33)	(Serbia) Vojvodina	
39	Ibrahim Zubairu	(Ghana) (Serbia)	LW	2 June 2004 (age 21)	(Serbia) Jedinstvo Ub	
42	Dušan Jovanović	(Serbia)	CF	15 February 2006 (age 20)	Youth system	
43	Nemanja Trifunović	(Serbia)	LW	29 June 2004 (age 21)	Youth system	

== Friendlies ==
26 June 2024 Friendly	Bravo (Slovenia)	2–1	(Serbia) Partizan	Brežice, Slovenia
18:00	de Medina 2' (o.g.); Tučić 27'	Report	Jovanović 36'	Referee:

3 July 2024 Friendly	Dynamo Moscow (Russia)	2–2 (2–4 p)	(Serbia) Partizan	Moscow, Russia
18:30	Lepskiy 76'; Grulyov 86'	Report	Nikolić 88'; Šćekić 90+1'	Stadium: VTB Arena; Attendance: 14,000; Referee: (Russia) Sergey Cheban
	Penalties
	Grulyov (penalty scored); Skopintsev (penalty missed); Fomin (penalty missed); Okishor (penalty scored)		Natkho (penalty scored); Živković (penalty scored); Nikolić] (penalty scored); Jovanović (penalty scored)

7 July 2024 Friendly	CSKA Moscow (Russia)	3–0	(Serbia) Partizan	Moscow, Russia
18:30	Musayev 4'; Khellven 49'; Tošić 89'	Report		Stadium: VEB Arena; Attendance: 30,000; Referee:

10 July 2024 Friendly	Lokomotiv Moscow (Russia)	1–1	(Serbia) Partizan	Moscow, Russia
14:30	Kovačević 90' (o.g.)	Report	Saldanha 30'	Stadium: RZD Arena; Referee:

15 January 2025 Friendly	Debreceni VSC (Hungary)	1–1	(Serbia) Partizan	Antalya, Turkey
15:00	Szuhodovszki 56'	Report	Natkho 41'	Referee:

19 January 2025 Friendly	FK Dukla Prague (Czech Republic)	2–2	(Serbia) Partizan	Antalya, Turkey
15:00	Mešanović 24' (pen.); Jorginho 70'	Report	Kalulu 8'; Zubairu 9'	Referee:

23 January 2025 Friendly	Hebar Pazardzhik (Bulgaria)	0–1	(Serbia) Partizan	Antalya, Turkey
13:00		Report	Jovanović 45'	Referee:

24 January 2025 Friendly	Jagiellonia Białystok (Poland)	1–1	(Serbia) Partizan	Antalya, Turkey
15:00	Pululu 50'	Report	Kovač 21'	Referee:

22 March 2025 Friendly	Partizan (Serbia)	1–2	(Russia) CSKA Moscow	Belgrade, Serbia
18:00	Jovanović 90+8'	Report	Alerrandro 67'; Zhemaletdinov 90+2'	Stadium: Partizan Stadium; Attendance: 14,265; Referee: (Serbia) Milan Stefanović

== Competitions ==
=== Overview ===
Competition	Record							
Competition	P	W	D	L	GF	GA	GD	Win %
Serbian SuperLiga	37	21	10	6	73	40	+33	56.76
Serbian Cup	3	2	1	0	6	0	+6	66.67
Champions League	2	0	0	2	2	10	−8	0.00
Europa League	2	0	1	1	2	3	−1	0.00
Conference League	2	0	0	2	0	2	−2	0.00
Total	46	23	12	11	83	54	+29	50.00

=== Serbian Superliga ===
==== Regular season ====
===== League table =====
Pos	Team	Pld	W	D	L	GF	GA	GD	Pts	Qualification
1	Red Star Belgrade	30	28	2	0	106	22	+84	86	Qualification for the Championship round
2	Partizan	30	18	9	3	58	29	+29	63	Qualification for the Championship round
3	OFK Beograd	30	13	7	10	40	39	+1	46	Qualification for the Championship round
4	Radnički 1923	30	13	6	11	47	40	+7	45	Qualification for the Championship round
5	Vojvodina	30	11	9	10	48	40	+8	42	Qualification for the Championship round

Source: SuperLiga (in Serbian)
Rules for classification: 1) Points; 2) Head-to-head points; 3) Head-to-head goal difference; 4) Head-to-head goals scored; 5) Head-to-head away goals scored (if two teams tied); 6) Goal difference; 7) Goals scored; 8) Fair play ranking; 9) Draw.

==== Results by matchday ====
Round	1	2	3	4	5	6	7	8	9	10	11	12	13	14	15	16	17	18	19	20	21	22	23	24	25	26	27	28	29	30
Ground	A	A	H	A	H	A	H	A	H	A	H	A	H	A	H	H	H	A	H	A	H	A	H	A	H	A	H	A	H	A
Result	W	W	W	D	W	L	D	L	L	W	W	W	W	W	D	D	W	W	D	W	D	D	W	D	W	W	W	W	D	W
Position	7	1	1	2	2	2	6	7	9	6	5	4	4	4	3	3	2	2	2	2	2	2	2	2	2	2	2	2	2	2

Updated to match(es) played on 6 April 2025. Source: Partizan
A = Away; H = Home; W = Win; D = Draw; L = Loss

=== Results ===
19 July 2024 1	Napredak Kruševac	0–1	Partizan	Belgrade
21:00	Tosheski (red card) 67'; Vukajlović (yellow card) 90'	Report	Saldanha 90+3' (yellow card) 90+5'	Stadium: Partizan Stadium; Referee: (Serbia) Novak Simović

27 July 2024 2	Jedinstvo Ub	0–4	Partizan	Ub
20:00	Golubović (yellow card) 45+1'; Ferreira (yellow card) 83'	Report	Natcho 2' (pen.); Trifunović 27'; Jovanović 52', 65'; Jurčević (yellow card) 56'; Zahid (yellow card) 69'	Stadium: Dragan Džajić Stadium; Referee: (Serbia) Nenad Minaković

4 August 2024 3	Partizan	2–0	Železničar Pančevo	Belgrade
20:00	Marković 13'; Jovanović 39'; Đurđević (yellow card) 51'; Arriaga (yellow card) 90'	Report	Mitrović (yellow card) 47'; Ezeh (yellow card) 51'; Blagojević (yellow card) 74'; Romanić (red card) 85'	Stadium: Partizan Stadium; Referee: (Serbia) Miloš Milanović

11 August 2024 4	IMT	0–0	Partizan	Zaječar
20:00	Konstantinov (yellow card) 83'	Report	Natcho (yellow card) 90'	Stadium: Kraljevica Stadium; Referee: (Serbia) Marko Ivković

4 December 2024* 5	Partizan	3–1	Radnički Niš	Belgrade
16:30	Natcho 3'; Filipović 35'; Zubairu 67'; Fuhrer (yellow card) 85'	Report	Ilić (yellow card) 22'; Stewart 39' (yellow card) 71'	Stadium: Partizan Stadium; Referee: (Serbia) Milan Stefanović

12 December 2024* 6	Spartak Subotica	2–1	Partizan	Subotica
16:30	Mijailović (yellow card) 16'; Tomović 24'; Ubiparip 55'; Vitorović (yellow card) 66'	Report	Nikolić 17'; Ilić (yellow card) 28'; Kalulu (yellow card) 40'; Ugrešić (yellow card) 90+2'	Stadium: Subotica City Stadium; Referee: (Serbia) Milan Mitić

1 September 2024 7	Partizan	0–0	Vojvodina	Belgrade
21:05	Kovač (yellow card) 3'; Đurđević (yellow card) 10'	Report	Korać (yellow card) 1'; Butean (yellow card) 64'	Stadium: Partizan Stadium; Referee: (Serbia) Miloš Milanović

15 September 2024 8	OFK Beograd	3–2	Partizan	Zaječar
19:00	Owusu 18'; Addo (yellow card) 48'; Paločević 86' (pen.); Stojilković 90+6' (yellow card) 90+6'	Report	Filipović 15'; Zubairu 40'; Šćekić (yellow card) 90'; Nikolić (yellow card) 90+3'	Stadium: Zaječar City Stadium; Referee: (Serbia) Milan Stefanović

23 September 2024 9	Partizan	0–4	Red Star Belgrade	Belgrade
19:00	Ilić (yellow card) 31'; Mujakić (yellow card) 51'; Jovanović (yellow card) 80'	Report	Ndiaye 24' (pen.), 55', 65'; Elšnik (yellow card) 32'; Silas 45+3'	Stadium: Partizan Stadium; Referee: (Serbia) Novak Simović

29 September 2024 10	Mladost Lučani	1–3	Partizan	Lučani
17:00	Krsmanović (yellow card) 38'; Pejović 45+2' (pen.) (yellow card) 54'; Žunić (yellow card) 80'	Report	Ilić 12'; Jovanović 26'; Kovač 57'; Stjepanović (yellow card) 90+5'	Stadium: Mladost Stadium; Referee: (Serbia) Nenad Minaković

5 October 2024 11	Partizan	4–1	Tekstilac Odžaci	Belgrade
18:30	Zubairu 39'; Natcho 52'; Zahid 61' (yellow card) 25'; Nikolić 89'	Report	Skrobonja (yellow card) 7'; Davidović 45+1' (pen.); Vasić (yellow card) 59'	Stadium: Partizan Stadium; Referee: (Serbia) Predrag Janjuš

21 October 2024 12	Novi Pazar	3–4	Partizan	Novi Pazar
16:00	Đuranović 16', 84'; Bojat 21' (yellow card) 81'; Miletić (yellow card) 25'; Opara (yellow card) 90+5'	Report	Jovanović (yellow card) 37'; Zubairu 38', 74' (yellow card) 44'; Kovač 41', 90+3' (yellow card) 90+4'; Natcho (yellow card) 58'; Owusu (yellow card) 61'; Ilić (yellow card) 90+5'; Zahid (yellow card) 90+5'	Stadium: Novi Pazar City Stadium; Attendance: 0 Referee: (Serbia) Miloš Milanović

26 October 2024 13	Partizan	3–1	Čukarički	Belgrade
15:55	Ilić (yellow card) 30'; Natcho 54' (pen.); Filipović 65'; Kalulu 89'	Report	Docić (yellow card) 13'; Cvetković 24' (yellow card) 28'; Tufegdžić (yellow card) 48'; Stevanović (yellow card) 53'	Stadium: Partizan Stadium; Referee: (Serbia) Milan Ilić

3 November 2024 14	TSC	1–2	Partizan	Bačka Topola
19:30	Bagnack (yellow card) 17'; Mboungou (yellow card) 45+2'; Đakovac 74' (pen.) (yellow card) 76'; Ćirković (yellow card) 76'; Ilić (yellow card) 76'; Banjac (yellow card) 78'	Report	Jovanović 7'; Natcho 18' (pen.); Ilić (yellow card) 29'; Kovač (yellow card) 73'; Jovanović (yellow card) 73'; Zubairu (yellow card) 76'; Filipović (yellow card) 81'	Stadium: TSC Arena; Referee: (Serbia) Predrag Janjuš

10 November 2024 15	Partizan	2–2	Radnički 1923	Belgrade
15:00	Jurčević (yellow card) 19'; Natcho 25'; Jovanović 33'; Šćekić (yellow card) 66'	Report	Mitrović (yellow card) 16'; Simović 38'; Nlandu (yellow card) 47'; Radović (yellow card) 56'; Ben Hassine 83'; Stankovski (yellow card) 90+2'	Stadium: Partizan Stadium; Referee: (Serbia) Novak Simović

24 November 2024 16	Partizan	0–0	Napredak Kruševac	Belgrade
16:00	Natcho (yellow card) 81'	Report	Ignjatović (yellow card) 38' (yellow-red card) 89'; Balević (yellow card) 90+1'	Stadium: Partizan Stadium; Referee: (Serbia) Stanko Ostraćanin

30 November 2024 17	Partizan	3–0	Jedinstvo Ub	Belgrade
14:55	Natcho 46'; Nikolić 49'; Zubairu 53'	Report	Damjanić (yellow card) 32'	Stadium: Partizan Stadium; Referee: (Serbia) Andrija Stojanović

8 December 2024 18	Železničar Pančevo	0–1	Partizan	Pančevo
19:00	Stojanović (yellow card) 53'; Sanogo (yellow card) 53'; Đuričić (yellow card) 81'	Report	Zubairu (yellow card) 45+1'; Stjepanović (yellow card) 46'; Nikolić 66'	Stadium: Stadium SC Mladost; Referee: (Serbia) Aleksandar Živković

16 December 2024 19	Partizan	1–1	IMT	Belgrade
19:00	Ilić 26' (yellow card) 89'; Šćekić (yellow card) 81'	Report	Jović (yellow card) 39'; Lutovac (yellow card) 44'; Krstić 67'; Radočaj (yellow card) 72'; Popović (yellow card) 77'; Bonnet (yellow card) 89'; Abiodun (yellow card) 90+2'; Court (yellow card) 90+2'; Glišić (yellow card) 90+5'	Stadium: Partizan Stadium; Referee: (Serbia) Pavle Tomić

21 December 2024 20	Radnički Niš	0–1	Partizan	Niš
16:00		Report	Šćekić 5'; Đurđević (yellow card) 46' (yellow-red card) 54'; Zubairu (yellow card) 82'; Jovanović (yellow card) 85'	Stadium: Čair Stadium; Referee: (Serbia) Stanko Ostraćanin

1 February 2025 21	Partizan	2–2	Spartak Subotica	Belgrade
18:30	Kalulu 74', 88'; Ilić (yellow card) 90+1'	Report	Todoroski 28'; Tomović 38'	Stadium: Partizan Stadium; Referee: (Serbia) Srđan Jovanović

8 February 2025 22	Vojvodina	0–0	Partizan	Novi Sad
18:30	Kokanović (yellow card) 44'	Report	Jurčević (yellow card) 45'; Zubairu (yellow card) 57'; Simić (yellow card) 79'	Stadium: Karađorđe Stadium; Referee: (Serbia) Miloš Milanović

15 February 2025 23	Partizan	4–1	OFK Beograd	Belgrade
14:00	Kalulu 3'; Natcho 16' (pen.); Jurčević (yellow card) 26'; Nikolić 36'; Zubairu 76' (yellow card) 68'	Report	Tosheski (red card) 13'; Knežević 52' (pen.)	Stadium: Partizan Stadium; Referee: (Serbia) Milan Stefanović

22 February 2025 24	Red Star Belgrade	3–3	Partizan	Belgrade
16:00	Ndiaye 46', 51'; Young-woo (yellow card) 62'; Ivanić 62'	Report	Zubairu 8' (yellow card) 43'; Šehović (yellow card) 38'; Kovač 59'; Mujakić (yellow card) 84'; Nikolić 90+5' (pen.)	Stadium: Rajko Mitić Stadium; Referee: (Serbia) Nenad Minaković

26 February 2025 25	Partizan	2–0	Mladost Lučani	Belgrade
18:05	Nikolić 36'; Goh 76'	Report		Stadium: Partizan Stadium; Referee: (Serbia) Danilo Nikolić

2 March 2025 26	Tekstilac Odžaci	1–4	Partizan	Loznica
14:00	Barac 61'	Report	Nikolić 32' (pen.) 64'; Zubairu 36' (pen.); Jurčević (yellow card) 71'; Natcho 82'	Stadium: Lagator Stadium; Referee: (Serbia) Miloš Milanović

8 March 2025 27	Partizan	3–2	Novi Pazar	Belgrade
18:05	Nikolić 5'; Filipović 30'; Jovanović (yellow card) 54'; Natcho 71'	Report	Opara 68'; Kovačević 83'; Lakićević (yellow card) 90+1'	Stadium: Partizan Stadium; Referee: (Serbia) Milan Ilić

16 March 2025 28	Čukarički	0–1	Partizan	Belgrade
18:05	Milojević (yellow card) 26'; Serafimović (yellow card) 36'; Srnić (yellow card) 54'	Report	Roganović (yellow card) 37'; Šćekić 45+1' (yellow card) 63'; Zubairu (yellow card) 78'; Jovanović (yellow card) 90+2'; Ilić (yellow card) 90+3'	Stadium: Čukarički Stadium; Referee: (Serbia) Milan Stefanović

29 March 2025 29	Partizan	0–0	TSC	Belgrade
16:30	Trifunović (yellow card) 90+3'	Report		Stadium: Partizan Stadium; Referee: (Serbia) Dejan Trifković

6 April 2025 30	Radnički 1923	0–2	Partizan	Kragujevac
15:00	Adžić (yellow card) 52'; Dadić (yellow card) 63'	Report	Kalulu (yellow card) 58'; Milošević 67', 74'; Ilić (yellow card) 81'	Stadium: Čika Dača Stadium; Referee: (Serbia) Nenad Minaković

==== Championship round ====
Pos	Team	Pld	W	D	L	GF	GA	GD	Pts	Qualification	RSB	PAR	NPZ	OFK	RDK	VOJ	TSC	MLA
1	Red Star Belgrade (C)	37	32	4	1	123	35	+88	100	Qualification for the Champions League second qualifying round		2–1		5–2		1–1		3–1
2	Partizan	37	21	10	6	73	40	+33	73	Qualification for the Europa League first qualifying round (Note: The winner of the 2024–25 Serbian Cup (Red Star Belgrade) qualifies for the Europa League first qualifying round, so the second place team (Partizan) takes the Europa League berth and the fourth place team gets a Conference League berth.)				2–2	3–1	3–2	1–2	
3	Novi Pazar	37	15	9	13	60	65	−5	54	Qualification for the Conference League second qualifying round	3–3	2–1				0–1		
4	OFK Beograd	37	15	8	14	53	54	−1	53	Ineligible for European competitions (Note: OFK Beograd qualified for the second qualifying round of the UEFA Conference League but failed to obtain a UEFA license. As a result, the berth was given to the fifth place Radnički 1923.)			2–3		3–0	1–2		1–0
5	Radnički 1923	37	15	8	14	60	53	+7	53	Qualification for the Conference League second qualifying round	4–1		2–3				5–2	1–1

Source: SuperLiga (in Serbian)
Rules for classification: 1) Points; 2) Points in regular season; 3) Head-to-head points in regular season; 4) Head-to-head goal difference in regular season; 5) Head-to-head goals scored in regular season; 6) Head-to-head away goals scored in regular season (if two teams tied); 7) Goal difference; 8) Goals scored; 9) Fair play ranking; 10) Drawing of lots.
(C) Champions

===== Results by matchday =====
Round	1	2	3	4	5	6	7
Ground	A	H	H	A	H	A	H
Result	L	D	W	L	L	W	W
Position	2	2	2	2	2	2	2

Updated to match(es) played on 26 May 2025. Source: Partizan
A = Away; H = Home; W = Win; D = Draw; L = Loss

12 April 2025 31	Red Star Belgrade	2–1	Partizan	Belgrade
16:00	Annan (yellow card) 56'; Ndiaye (yellow card) 66'; Katai (yellow card) 71'; Maksimović 84' (pen.); Simić 87' (o.g.)	Report	Filipović (yellow card) 30'; Kalulu 39' (yellow card) 45+4'; Mujakić (yellow card) 45'; Ilić (yellow card) 50'	Stadium: Red Star Stadium; Referee: (Serbia) Milan Ilić

23 April 2025 32	Partizan	2–2	OFK Beograd	Belgrade
18:00	Natcho 20', 46' (pen.); Simić (red card) 36'; Jurčević (yellow card) 48'	Report	Stojilković 42', 49'; Vukičević (yellow card) 79'	Stadium: Partizan Stadium; Referee: (Serbia) Novak Simović

27 April 2025 33	Partizan	3–1	Radnički 1923	Belgrade
19:30	Milošević 18'; Mujakić (yellow card) 57'; Ugrešić 59'; Jovanović (yellow card) 82'; Vukotić 90+5'	Report	Mirčetić (yellow card) 13'; Radović (yellow card) 45+3'; Bah 46'; Ćosić (yellow card) 69'; Ben Hassine (yellow card) 71'; Mitrović (yellow card) 90+2'	Stadium: Partizan Stadium; Referee: (Serbia) Nenad Minaković

4 May 2025 34	Novi Pazar	2–1	Partizan	Novi Pazar
17:00	Mary (yellow card) 25' (goal) 45+1'; Bojat (yellow card) 45+4'; Jovanović 50' (o.g.)	Report	Trifunović (yellow card) 40'; Dragojević (yellow card) 64'; Goh (yellow card) 77'; Ilić 87'	Stadium: Novi Pazar City Stadium; Referee: (Serbia) David Matić

11 May 2025 35	Partizan	1–2	TSC	Belgrade
20:00	Ugrešić (yellow card) 36'; Natcho 59'; Dragojević (yellow card) 77'; Filipović (yellow card) 90+4'	Report	Capan (yellow card) 16'; Stanić 64', 81'; Radin (yellow card) 78'; Jovanović (yellow card) 88'	Stadium: Partizan Stadium; Referee: (Serbia) Nenad Minaković

17 May 2025 36	Mladost Lučani	0–4	Partizan	Lučani
18:30	Pejović (yellow card) 80'	Report	Kalulu 13'; Ugrešić (yellow card) 43' (goal) 44', 58'; Vukotić 78'	Stadium: Lučani Stadium; Referee: (Serbia) Aleksandar Živković

25 May 2025 37	Partizan	3–2	Vojvodina	Belgrade
19:00	Natcho 31', 71'; Vukotić 26'; Mujakić (yellow card) 26'; Alilović (yellow card) 85'	Report	Romanić 56'; Veličković (yellow card) 70'; Kokanović 81'; Yusuf (yellow card) 90+2'; Savićević (yellow card) 90+5'	Stadium: Partizan Stadium; Referee: (Serbia) Milan Mitić

=== Serbian Cup ===
30 Оctober 2024 Round of 32	Mladost GAT	0–3	Partizan	Novi Sad
19:00	Madžarević (yellow card) 35'; Sanchez (yellow card) 88'	Report	Kalulu (yellow card) 9'; Zubairu 14'; Ilić 55'; Jovanović (yellow card) 78'; Nikolić 83'	Stadium: Karađorđe Stadium; Attendance: 3,000; Referee: (Serbia) Milan Stefanović

12 March 2025 Round of 16	Radnik Surdulica	0–3	Partizan	Surdulica
16:00	Abubakar (yellow card) 34'; Puzović (yellow card) 35'	Report	Vukotić 25'; Jovanović (yellow card) 34'; Kovač 34'; Zubairu 59'	Stadium: Surdulica City Stadium; Referee: (Serbia) Novak Simović

2 April 2025 Quarter-final	Partizan	0–0 (9–10 p)	TSC	Belgrade
18:15	Stjepanović (yellow card) 45+1'; Kalulu (yellow card) 90'; Roganović (yellow card)	Report	Jovanović (yellow card) 8'; Vulić (yellow card) 33'; Radin (yellow card) 74'; Pantović (yellow card)	Stadium: Partizan Stadium; Attendance: 2,000; Referee: (Serbia) Srđan Jovanović
	Penalties
	Natcho (penalty scored); Nikolić (penalty scored); Dragojević (penalty missed); Kalulu (penalty scored); Roganović (penalty scored); Mujakić (penalty scored); Filipović (penalty scored); Goh (penalty scored); Jurčević (penalty missed); Ugrešić (penalty scored); Jovanović (penalty scored); Natcho (penalty missed)		Milosavljević (penalty missed); Degenek (penalty scored); Mboungou (penalty scored); Pantović (penalty scored); Lazetić (penalty scored); Jovanović (penalty scored); Radojević (penalty scored); Capan (penalty scored); Radin (penalty missed); Stančić (penalty scored); Simić (penalty scored); Mboungou (penalty scored)

=== UEFA Champions League ===
==== Second qualifying round ====
23 July 2024 Second qualifying round	Dynamo Kyiv (Ukraine)	6–2	(Serbia) Partizan	Lubin, Poland
20:00	Shaparenko 40'; Brazhko 43' (yellow card) 47'; Karavayev 45+1'; Kabayev 55'; Popov 83'; Pikhalyonok 90+2'	Report	Saldanha (yellow card) 2' (goal) 22' (pen.), 66' de Medina (yellow card) 11'; Arriaga (yellow card) 81'	Stadium: Lubin Stadium (Note: Due to the Russian invasion of Ukraine, Ukrainian teams were required to play their home matches at neutral venues until further notice.); Attendance: 4,712; Referee: (Germany) Christian Dingert

31 July 2024 Second qualifying round	Partizan (Serbia)	0–3 (2–9 agg.)	(Ukraine) Dynamo Kyiv	Belgrade, Serbia
19:00	Filipović (yellow card) 58'; Marković (yellow card) 90'	Report	Yarmolenko 17'; Vanat 68' (pen.); Karavayev 90+3'	Stadium: Partizan Stadium; Attendance: 0 (Note: The Partizan v Dynamo Kyiv match was played behind closed doors due to a punishment by UEFA to Partizan for discriminatory and racist behaviour of their fans during the match against Nordsjælland in the 2023–24 UEFA Europa Conference League qualifying phase, and due to the clubs' agreement not to admit any away fans for both games.); Referee: (Romania) Marian Barbu

=== UEFA Europa League ===
==== Third qualifying round ====
8 August 2024 Third qualifying round	Partizan (Serbia)	0–1	(Switzerland) Lugano	Belgrade, Serbia
20:00	Zubairu (yellow card) 29'	Report	Bislim (yellow card) 35'; Zanotti 73'	Stadium: Partizan Stadium; Attendance: 3,163; Referee: (Netherlands) Sander van der Eijk

15 August 2024 Third qualifying round	Lugano (Switzerland)	2–2 (3–2 agg.)	(Serbia) Partizan	Thun, Switzerland
20:30	Steffen 48' (yellow card) 115'; Hajdari (yellow card) 49' (yellow-red card) 88'; Valenzuela (yellow card) 105'; Mahmoud 111' (yellow card) 112'; El Wafi (yellow card) 112'; Doumbia (yellow card) 120+3'	Report	Arriaga (yellow card) 17'; Zubairu (yellow card) 33'; Zahid 44'; Marković 67'; Mujakić (yellow card) 70'	Stadium: Stockhorn Arena; Attendance: 2,268; Referee: (Spain) Ricardo de Burgos Bengoetxea

=== UEFA Conference League ===
==== Play-off round ====
22 August 2024 Play-off round	Partizan (Serbia)	0–1	(Belgium) Gent	Belgrade, Serbia
20:15	Jurčević (yellow card) 36'; Marković (yellow card) 74'; Lazarević (yellow card) 84'	Report	Gandelman 16'; Brown (yellow card) 18'; Pardo (yellow card) 82'; Dean (yellow card) 83'; Kums (yellow card) 86'; Torunarigha (yellow card) 86'	Stadium: Partizan Stadium; Attendance: 0 Referee: (Azerbaijan) Elchin Masiyev

28 August 2024 Play-off round	Gent (Belgium)	1–0 (2–0 agg.)	(Serbia) Partizan	Ghent, Belgium
18:00	Gambor (yellow card) 20'; Delorge 88'	Report	Arriaga (yellow card) 21' de Medina (yellow card) 28'	Stadium: Planet Group Arena; Attendance: 10,437; Referee: (Slovakia) Filip Glova

== Statistics ==
=== Squad statistics ===
No.	Pos	Nat	Player	Total		SuperLiga		Cup		Europe	
No.	Pos	Nat	Player	Apps	Goals	Apps	Goals	Apps	Goals	Apps	Goals
Goalkeepers
1	GK	(Serbia) SRB	Aleksandar Jovanović	46	0	37	0	3	0	6	0
31	GK	(Serbia) SRB	Miloš Krunić	0	0	0	0	0	0	0	0
85	GK	(Serbia) SRB	Nemanja Stevanović	0	0	0	0	0	0	0	0
Defenders
3	DF	(Serbia) SRB	Mihajlo Ilić	31	4	29	3	2	1	0	0
4	DF	(Slovenia) SVN	Mario Jurčević	34	0	27	0	2	0	5	0
12	DF	(Serbia) SRB	Zlatan Šehović	2	0	2	0	0	0	0	0
17	DF	(Serbia) SRB	Marko Živković	3	0	2	0	1	0	0	0
18	DF	(Bosnia and Herzegovina) BIH	Nihad Mujakić	34	0	26	0	2	0	6	0
21	DF	(North Macedonia) MKD	Bojan Dimoski	4	0	3	0	1	0	0	0
24	DF	(Serbia) SRB	Vukašin Đurđević	12	0	12	0	0	0	0	0
25	DF	(Belgium) BEL	Nathan de Medina	6	0	0	0	0	0	6	0
26	DF	(Serbia) SRB	Aleksandar Filipović	34	4	28	4	3	0	3	0
30	DF	(Montenegro) MNE	Milan Roganović	18	0	17	0	1	0	0	0
40	DF	(Serbia) SRB	Nikola Simić	9	0	9	0	0	0	0	0
50	DF	(Serbia) SRB	Milan Lazarević	7	0	5	0	0	0	2	0
Midfielders
10	MF	(Israel) ISR	Bibras Natkho	44	15	35	15	3	0	6	0
11	MF	(Montenegro) MNE	Milan Vukotić	17	4	16	3	1	1	0	0
14	MF	(Bosnia and Herzegovina) BIH	Stefan Kovač	33	5	29	4	2	1	2	0
19	MF	(Montenegro) MNE	Aleksandar Šćekić	30	2	27	2	2	0	1	0
27	MF	(Senegal) SEN	Pape Fuhrer	10	0	9	0	1	0	0	0
29	MF	(Norway) NOR	Ghayas Zahid	20	2	13	1	1	0	6	1
36	MF	(Serbia) SRB	Ognjen Ugrešić	12	3	11	3	1	0	0	0
45	MF	(Serbia) SRB	Mateja Stjepanović	17	0	15	0	2	0	0	0
70	MF	(Serbia) SRB	Dimitrije Janković	5	0	5	0	0	0	0	0
77	MF	(South Korea) KOR	Goh Young-jun	23	1	16	1	2	0	5	0
78	MF	(Serbia) SRB	Mihajlo Petrović	1	0	1	0	0	0	0	0
80	MF	(Serbia) SRB	Vanja Dragojević	11	0	9	0	2	0	0	0
90	MF	(Serbia) SRB	Zoran Alilović	11	0	11	0	0	0	0	0
Forwards
7	FW	(Serbia) SRB	Jovan Milošević	7	3	5	3	2	0	0	0
9	FW	(Serbia) SRB	Đorđe Jovanović	23	6	19	6	1	0	3	0
15	FW	(Democratic Republic of the Congo) COD	Aldo Kalulu	41	6	34	6	2	0	5	0
23	FW	(Serbia) SRB	Nemanja Nikolić	33	11	28	10	2	1	3	0
39	FW	(Ghana) GHA	Ibrahim Zubairu	34	11	26	9	3	2	5	0
42	FW	(Serbia) SRB	Dušan Jovanović	14	0	13	0	1	0	0	0
43	FW	(Serbia) SRB	Nemanja Trifunović	23	1	19	1	1	0	3	0
Players transferred out during the season
5	DF	(Serbia) SRB	Nikola Antić	8	0	6	0	0	0	2	0
6	DF	(Serbia) SRB	Svetozar Marković	10	2	4	1	0	0	6	1
7	FW	(Curaçao) CUW	Xander Severina	11	0	5	0	0	0	6	0
11	FW	(Brazil) BRA	Matheus Saldanha	6	3	1	1	0	0	5	2
16	MF	(Ghana) GHA	Leonard Owusu	10	0	8	0	0	0	2	0
20	FW	(Peru) PER	Joao Grimaldo	10	0	5	0	1	0	4	0
33	MF	(Honduras) HON	Kervin Arriaga	21	0	15	0	1	0	5	0
36	DF	(Serbia) SRB	Bojan Kovačević	0	0	0	0	0	0	0	0
38	FW	(Serbia) SRB	Janko Jevremović	0	0	0	0	0	0	0	0
88	DF	(Serbia) SRB	Marko Kerkez	1	0	1	0	0	0	0	0
99	FW	(Serbia) SRB	Aleksa Janković	0	0	0	0	0	0	0	0

Last updated: 26 May 2025
Source: Competitions

=== Goal scorers ===
Rank	No.	Pos	Nat	Name	SuperLiga	Serbian Cup	Europe	Total
1	10	MF	(Israel)	Bibras Natkho	15	0	0	15
2	23	FW	(Serbia)	Nemanja Nikolić	10	1	0	11
2	39	FW	(Ghana)	Ibrahim Zubairu	9	2	0	11
3	9	FW	(Serbia)	Đorđe Jovanović	6	0	0	6
3	15	FW	(Democratic Republic of the Congo)	Aldo Kalulu	6	0	0	6
4	14	MF	(Bosnia and Herzegovina)	Stefan Kovač	4	1	0	5
5	26	DF	(Serbia)	Aleksandar Filipović	4	0	0	4
5	3	DF	(Serbia)	Mihajlo Ilić	3	1	0	4
5	11	MF	(Montenegro)	Milan Vukotić	3	1	0	4
6	11	FW	(Brazil)	Matheus Saldanha	1	0	2	3
6	7	FW	(Serbia)	Jovan Milošević	3	0	0	3
6	36	MF	(Serbia)	Ognjen Ugrešić	3	0	0	3
7	6	DF	(Serbia)	Svetozar Marković	1	0	1	2
7	19	MF	(Montenegro)	Aleksandar Šćekić	2	0	0	2
7	29	MF	(Norway)	Ghayas Zahid	1	0	1	2
8	43	FW	(Serbia)	Nemanja Trifunović	1	0	0	1
8	77	MF	(South Korea)	Goh Young-jun	1	0	0	1
Totals					76	3	4	83

Last updated: 26 May 2025

=== Clean sheets ===
Rank	No.	Pos	Nat	Name	SuperLiga	Serbian Cup	Europe	Total
1	1	GK	(Serbia)	Aleksandar Jovanović	15	3	0	18
Totals					15	3	0	18

Last updated: 17 May 2025

=== Disciplinary record ===
Number	Nation	Position	Name	SuperLiga		Serbian Cup		Europe		Total	
Number	Nation	Position	Name	Booked	Sent off (straight red)	Booked	Sent off (straight red)	Booked	Sent off (straight red)	Booked	Sent off (straight red)
1	(Serbia)	GK	Aleksandar Jovanović	4	0	0	0	0	0	4	0
3	(Serbia)	DF	Mihajlo Ilić	10	0	0	0	0	0	10	0
4	(Slovenia)	DF	Mario Jurčević	6	0	0	0	1	0	7	0
6	(Serbia)	DF	Svetozar Marković	0	0	0	0	2	0	2	0
9	(Serbia)	FW	Đorđe Jovanović	3	0	1	0	0	0	4	0
10	(Israel)	MF	Bibras Natkho	3	0	0	0	0	0	3	0
11	(Brazil)	FW	Matheus Saldanha	1	0	0	0	1	0	2	0
12	(Serbia)	DF	Zlatan Šehović	1	0	0	0	0	0	1	0
14	(Bosnia and Herzegovina)	MF	Stefan Kovač	3	0	0	0	0	0	3	0
15	(Democratic Republic of the Congo)	FW	Aldo Kalulu	3	0	2	0	0	0	5	0
16	(Ghana)	MF	Leonard Owusu	1	0	0	0	0	0	1	0
18	(Bosnia and Herzegovina)	DF	Nihad Mujakić	5	0	0	0	1	0	6	0
19	(Montenegro)	MF	Aleksandar Šćekić	4	0	0	0	0	0	4	0
23	(Serbia)	FW	Nemanja Nikolić	1	0	0	0	0	0	1	0
24	(Serbia)	DF	Vukašin Đurđević	4	1	0	0	0	0	4	1
25	(Belgium)	DF	Nathan de Medina	0	0	0	0	2	0	2	0
26	(Serbia)	DF	Aleksandar Filipović	3	0	0	0	1	0	4	0
27	(Senegal)	MF	Pape Fuhrer	1	0	0	0	0	0	1	0
29	(Norway)	MF	Ghayas Zahid	3	0	0	0	0	0	3	0
30	(Montenegro)	DF	Milan Roganović	1	0	1	0	0	0	2	0
33	(Honduras)	MF	Kervin Arriaga	1	0	0	0	3	0	4	0
36	(Serbia)	MF	Ognjen Ugrešić	3	0	0	0	0	0	3	0
39	(Ghana)	MF	Ibrahim Zubairu	8	0	0	0	2	0	10	0
40	(Serbia)	DF	Nikola Simić	1	1	0	0	0	0	1	1
42	(Serbia)	FW	Dušan Jovanović	0	0	1	0	0	0	1	0
43	(Serbia)	FW	Nemanja Trifunović	2	0	0	0	0	0	2	0
45	(Serbia)	MF	Mateja Stjepanović	2	0	1	0	0	0	3	0
50	(Serbia)	DF	Milan Lazarević	0	0	0	0	1	0	1	0
77	(South Korea)	MF	Goh Young-jun	1	0	0	0	0	0	1	0
80	(Serbia)	MF	Vanja Dragojević	2	0	0	0	0	0	2	0
90	(Serbia)	MF	Zoran Alilović	1	0	0	0	0	0	1	0
			TOTALS	78	2	6	0	14	0	98	2

Last updated: 26 May 2025

=== Game as captain ===
Rank	No.	Pos	Nat	Name	SuperLiga	Serbian Cup	Europe	Total
1	1	GK	(Serbia)	Aleksandar Jovanović	33	3	0	36
2	6	DF	(Serbia)	Svetozar Marković	4	0	6	10
Totals					37	3	6	46

Last updated: 26 May 2025
