= Zeković =

Zeković (Serbian Cyrillic: Зeкoвић) is a Serbo-Croatian surname. It may refer to:

- Miljan Zeković (1925–1993), Yugoslav footballer
- Arnela Zeković (born 1993), Serbian model
- Dragan Zeković (born 1987), Montenegrin basketballer
- Aleks Zeković (born 2006), French footballer
