= Nemanja Nikolić (footballer, born 1992) =

Serbian footballer

Personal information
- Date of birth: 19 October 1992 (age 34)
- Place of birth: Kraljevo, FR Yugoslavia
- Height: 1.88 m (6 ft 2 in)
- Position: Forward

Team information
- Current team: TSC
- Number: 12

Youth career
- Bubamara Kraljevo
- Sloga Kraljevo
- Metalac Kraljevo

Senior career*
Years	Team	Apps	(Gls)
2011–2012	Grbalj	37	(8)
2013–2016	Rostov	3	(0)
2016	Aktobe	5	(0)
2017–2018	Spartak Subotica	37	(12)
2018–2020	Partizan	29	(7)
2019	→ Vojvodina (loan)	9	(3)
2020	→ Spartak Subotica (loan)	18	(13)
2020–2021	Al Raed	14	(3)
2021	Tobol	17	(8)
2021–2022	Spartak Subotica	24	(11)
2022–2023	Vojvodina	31	(4)
2023–2025	Partizan	59	(15)
2025	Buriram United	2	(3)
2026	Budućnost	15	(2)
2026–	TSC	15	(7)
- * Club domestic league appearances and goals as of 1 November 2026

Nemanja Nikolić (Serbian Cyrillic: Немања Николић, pronounced [němaɲa nǐkolitɕ]; born 19 October 1992) is a Serbian professional footballer who plays as a forward for TSC.

== Career ==
=== Early years ===
Born in Kraljevo, Nikolić made his first football steps with local academy Bubamara, after which he moved to Sloga Kraljevo youth academy, and finally Metalac Kraljevo. Later he signed with the Montenegrin First League side Grbalj, where he played between 2011 and 2012.

On 22 February 2013, after he passed a ten-day trial period with a club, Nikolić signed a three-year contract with Rostov. He made his debut in the Russian Premier League on 20 October 2013 for FC Rostov in a game against Krylia Sovetov Samara under coach Miodrag Božović.

On 5 August 2016, Nikolić signed for FC Aktobe on a free transfer. After the end of season in the Kazakhstan Premier League, Nikolić left the club.

=== Spartak Subotica ===
In February 2017, Nikolić signed a 2 1/2-year deal with Spartak Subotica. For the first half-season with the club, Nikolić was mostly used as a back-up for Ognjen Mudrinski, making seven appearances without goals. At the beginning of the 2017–18 Serbian SuperLiga season, Nikolić became the first choice attacker under coach Aleksandar Veselinović, scoring a goal in the opening match of the season against OFK Bačka. After two scored goals and two assists he made in 4–0 away win against Borac Čačak in the second fixture match of the season, Nikolić was elected for the player of the week. He awarded for the second time in the 7th fixture of the same season, with two goals and an assist in 5–0 away victory over Vojvodina at the Karađorđe Stadium. Scoring a goal in 1–1 draw to Partizan, Nikolić was elected for the best on the field in a match played on 26 November 2017. Nikolić awarded as the club's best assistant in the mid season. In May 2018, Nikolić was elected in the best 11 players for the 2017–18 Serbian SuperLiga season, by clubs captains' and managers' choice.

=== Partizan ===
On 22 May 2018, Nikolić joined Partizan in a €350,000 transfer from Spartak Subotica. Media reported the deal also includes 20 percent of the future transfer. He was officially promoted on 28 May 2018, penning a three-year deal, when he also chose to wear number 9 jersey. He made his debut for Partizan in the first leg match of the first qualifying round for 2018–19 UEFA Europa League campaign, against Rudar Pljevlja.

Nikolić scored in the 159th Belgrade Eternal Derby, which ended in a 1–1 draw.

==== Loan to Vojvodina ====
On 19 August 2019, Nikolić signed a one-year-loan, with buyout option after 6 months, for Vojvodina.

=== Tobol ===
On 28 March 2021, Nikolić signed for FC Tobol until the end of the season. On 30 July 2021, Tobol announced the departure of Nikolić after his contract was terminated by mutual consent.

=== Return to Spartak Subotica ===
On 18 September 2021, he returned to Spartak Subotica. He signed for one year.

=== Return to Vojvodina ===
On 15 June 2022, Nikolić signed a two-year deal with Vojvodina.

=== Return to Partizan ===
On 3 July 2023, Nikolić signed a two-year deal with Partizan. On 3 September 2023, Nikolić scored his first goal after returning to Partizan in a game of the 6th round of the SuperLiga, a 3–2 away win over IMT. Nikolić scored the goal 5 minutes into injury time, to complete a Partizan comeback, as the Nerobianchi from Belgrade were 2–0 down after Nikola Kodžić scored for IMT in the 56th minute. On 25 October, against Radnički Kragujevac away, Nikolić scored a brace in a 4–0 PFC win. The turning point of the game was when Nikolić entered the game in the 62nd minute, Partizan scored three goals from then on. The assists for Nemanja "Taki" Nikolić's goals were provided by Menig and Stjepanović. On 1 November 2023. Partizan players beat Jedinstvo Ub with a score of 1–0 at the start of the 2023–24 Serbian Cup. Nikolić scored the winning goal early in the second half. On 10 February 2024. only a minute after entering the field, Nikolić provided the assist for Matheus Saldanha's winning goal in a 1–0 win over Javor Ivanjica.

== Career statistics ==
As of 17 June 2026

Appearances and goals by club, season and competition
Club	Season	League			National cup		Continental		Other		Total	
Club	Season	Division	Apps	Goals	Apps	Goals	Apps	Goals	Apps	Goals	Apps	Goals
Grbalj	2011–12	Montenegrin First League	21	4	0	0	—		—		21	4
Grbalj	2012–13	Montenegrin First League	16	4	2	1	—		—		18	5
Grbalj	Total		37	8	2	1	—		—		39	9
Rostov	2012–13	Russian Premier League	0	0	0	0	—		0	0	0	0
Rostov	2013–14	Russian Premier League	2	0	0	0	—		—		2	0
Rostov	2014–15	Russian Premier League	1	0	1	0	—		—		2	0
Rostov	2015–16	Russian Premier League	0	0	1	0	—		—		1	0
Rostov	Total		3	0	2	0	—		0	0	5	0
Aktobe	2016	Kazakhstan Premier League	5	0	0	0	0	0	—		5	0
Spartak Subotica	2016–17	Serbian SuperLiga	7	0	0	0	—		—		7	0
Spartak Subotica	2017–18	Serbian SuperLiga	30	12	2	1	—		—		32	13
Spartak Subotica	Total		37	12	2	1	—		—		39	13
Partizan	2018–19	Serbian SuperLiga	29	7	3	1	4	0	—		36	8
Partizan	2019–20	Serbian SuperLiga	0	0	0	0	0	0	—		0	0
Partizan	2020–21	Serbian SuperLiga	0	0	0	0	0	0	—		0	0
Partizan	Total		29	7	3	1	4	0	—		36	8
Vojvodina (loan)	2019–20	Serbian SuperLiga	9	3	2	0	—		—		11	3
Spartak Subotica (loan)	2019–20	Serbian SuperLiga	8	6	0	0	—		—		8	6
Spartak Subotica (loan)	2020–21	Serbian SuperLiga	10	7	0	0	—		—		10	7
Spartak Subotica (loan)	Total		18	13	0	0	—		—		18	13
Al Raed	2020–21	Saudi Professional League	14	3	1	0	—		—		15	3
Tobol	2021	Kazakhstan Premier League	17	8	1	0	1	0	0	0	19	8
Spartak Subotica	2021–22	Serbian SuperLiga	24	11	0	0	—		—		24	11
Vojvodina	2022–23	Serbian SuperLiga	31	4	4	2	—		—		35	6
Partizan	2023–24	Serbian SuperLiga	31	5	3	1	4	0	—		38	6
Partizan	2024–25	Serbian SuperLiga	28	10	2	1	3	0	—		33	11
Budućnost	2025–26	Montenegrin First League	15	2	0	0	0	0	—		15	2
Career total			298	86	22	7	12	0	0	0	332	93

== Honours ==
Rostov

- Russian Cup: 2013–14

Partizan

- Serbian Cup: 2018–19

Individual

- Serbian SuperLiga Team of the Season: 2017–18
