= Erik Kojzek =

Austrian footballer (born 2006)

Personal information
- Date of birth: 2 January 2006 (age 20)
- Place of birth: Slovenj Gradec, Slovenia
- Height: 1.94 m (6 ft 4 in)
- Position: Forward

Team information
- Current team: Partizan (on loan from Wolfsberger AC)
- Number: 9

Youth career
- –2018: Korotan Prevalje
- 2018–2023: Wolfsberger AC

Senior career*
Years	Team	Apps	(Gls)
2023–2024	Wolfsberger AC II	44	(16)
2024–	Wolfsberger AC	44	(11)
2026–	→ Partizan (loan)	14	(3)

International career^{‡}
2024	Slovenia U19	4	(0)
2025–	Austria U21	7	(3)
- * Club domestic league appearances and goals as of 8 November 2026 ‡ National team caps and goals as of 19:30, 6 October 2026 (UTC)

Erik Kojzek (born 2 January 2006) is a professional footballer who plays as a forward for Serbian SuperLiga club Partizan, on loan from Austrian Bundesliga club Wolfsberger AC. Born in Slovenia, he is a youth international for Austria.

== Club career ==
Kojzek joined the WAC youth team at the age of 12 from the Slovenian club NK Korotan. He made his Austrian Football Bundesliga debut against Austria Klagenfurt on 3 August 2024, which prompty earned he a professional contract signed with Wolfsberger AC until 2027.

== International career ==
Kojzek was called up to the Austria U21 team for friendly matches in June 2025.

== Career statistics ==
As of match played 8 November 2026

Appearances and goals by club, season and competition
Club	Season	League			National cup		Europe		Other		Total	
Club	Season	Division	Apps	Goals	Apps	Goals	Apps	Goals	Apps	Goals	Apps	Goals
Wolfsberger AC II	2022–23	Austrian Regionalliga Central	15	6	—		—		—		15	6
Wolfsberger AC II	2023–24	Austrian Regionalliga Central	27	9	—		—		—		27	9
Wolfsberger AC II	2024–25	Austrian Regionalliga Central	2	1	—		—		—		2	1
Wolfsberger AC II	Total		44	16	—		—		—		44	16
Wolfsberger AC	2024–25	Austrian Bundesliga	20	8	4	2	—		—		24	10
Wolfsberger AC	2025–26	Austrian Bundesliga	24	3	3	1	—		—		27	4
Wolfsberger AC	Total		44	11	7	3	—		—		51	14
Partizan (loan)	2026–27	Serbian SuperLiga	14	3	1	1	6 (Note: Appearances in UEFA Conference League)	2	—		21	6
Career total			102	30	8	4	6	2	0	0	116	36
