= Joao Grimaldo =

Peruvian footballer (born 2003)

Personal information
- Full name: Joao Alberto Grimaldo Ubidia
- Date of birth: 20 February 2003 (age 23)
- Place of birth: Lima, Peru
- Height: 1.75 m (5 ft 9 in)
- Position: Winger

Team information
- Current team: Sparta Prague
- Number: 21

Youth career
- –2015: Esther Grande
- 2016–2020: Sporting Cristal

Senior career*
Years	Team	Apps	(Gls)
2020–2024	Sporting Cristal	89	(14)
2024–2026	Partizan	5	(0)
2025	→ Riga (loan)	27	(4)
2026–	Sparta Prague	11	(1)

International career^{‡}
2019	Peru U17	9	(0)
2020	Peru U20	6	(0)
2023–	Peru	13	(1)
- * Club domestic league appearances and goals as of 15 May 2026 ‡ National team caps and goals as of 23:25, 31 March 2026 (UTC)

Joao Alberto Grimaldo Ubidia (born 20 February 2003) is a Peruvian professional footballer who plays as a winger for Czech club Sparta Prague and the Peru national team.

== Early years ==
Grimaldo was born in Lima, the capital of Peru. His family was based in the province of Lima, Rímac, a town located in the central subregion of Metropolitan Lima, Cono Centro.

From the first moments in which he played ball, he was inclined to practice offensive soccer. Although he developed his game at the María Reina del Cielo School, his first contact occurred in 2009, when a close relative created a futsal team in the Rímac District. He was tested to enter the lower divisions of the Atlético Ritma club. Colegio San Andrés was the name of the 2002 class team, created to play the Toque y Gol Cup in 2011, 2012 and 2013. The team won that tournament, remaining on the squad until it was 12 years old, the age at which Esther Grande de Bentín was able to sign him and the rule that governs the Peruvian Football Federation to include a footballer from that age.

This team became part of the minor divisions of the club, after being key in various matches of the different competitions, it was in the sights of the directors of Sporting Cristal who managed to make it part of the club's reserves at the beginning of 2016. Jorge Soto assigned him, along with the rest of his classmates —among them Carlos Ruiz, Marlon Perea, Flavio Alcedo, Leonardo Díaz, Gilmar Paredes and Aldair Vásquez—, psychologists, personalized tutors who guided him in his studies and doctors who observed his physical growth, making him that contributed to his formation as a person and footballer. Together with the team from the minor divisions, he won the 2018 Under-15 Centenary Tournament and the U-18 Copa Generación in his last season with the reserve.

== Club career ==
=== Sporting Cristal ===
==== 2020–2022: Rise to the first team ====
In 2021, Grimaldo already established himself in the team's starting lineup, and had a good season for La Celeste, playing 27 games and scoring one goal. During a match against Racing for the Copa Libertadores, he entered the starting lineup. However, the match was unsuccessful for both Joao and the club, which lost 2-0. However, Cristal had an excellent performance in the domestic cups, since on May 30 he won Phase 1 against the San Martín University 2-0 with goals from Hohberg and Riquelme. The following month, on June 25, he scored his first goal in a match against Ayacucho de Huamanga. The goalkeeper was Maximiliano Cavallotti. On the 27th of the following month, he won the Bicentennial Cup, against Carlos Mannucci, with Joao Grimaldo scoring a goal in the tournament.

By the beginning of 2022, Joao was shaping up to be one of those included in the first team. During the 2022 League 1, his scoring average increased considerably, going from 0.09 last year to 0.38 during the current championship. However, despite his growing figure in Peruvian soccer, he was not considered by the coach of the senior team at that moment. In April, Joao played a match with Sporting Cristal against San Martín for the opening championship, where he scored two goals. In September, he suffered the first expulsion of his career, playing against Binacional at the Guillermo Briceño Rosamedina. The semifinal of La Liga was played against the Foot Ball Club Melgar, on November 2 and 6. The first match was won by Melgar, at the Monumental, 2-0, while the second ended with the same result for the rival, at the Nacional de Lima. In this match, during the 36th minute, Grimaldo was removed and had suffered muscle discomfort in his right leg after a hard challenge from Alec Deneumostier nineteen minutes into the game. At the end of the season, in which Cristal finished 3rd in the national championship, Grimaldo ended up scoring a total of 4 goals in 25 games played.

=== Sparta Prague ===
On 10 January 2026, Grimaldo signed a contract with Czech First League club Sparta Prague.

== Career statistics ==
=== Club ===
As of match played 15 March 2026

Club	Season	League			Cup		Continental		Total	
Club	Season	Division	Apps	Goals	Apps	Goals	Apps	Goals	Apps	Goals
Sporting Cristal	2020	Liga 1	1	0	—		0	0	1	0
Sporting Cristal	2021	Liga 1	17	0	4 (Note: Appearances in Copa Bicentenario)	1	7 (Note: Three appearances in Copa Libertadores, four appearances in Copa Sudamericana)	0	28	1
Sporting Cristal	2022	Liga 1	24	4	—		1 (Note: Appearance(s) in Copa Libertadores)	0	25	4
Sporting Cristal	2023	Liga 1	32	7	—		11 (Note: Nine appearances and one goal in Copa Libertadores, two appearances in Copa Sudamericana)	1	43	8
Sporting Cristal	2024	Liga 1	15	3	—		1	0	16	0
Sporting Cristal	Total		89	14	4	1	20	0	103	15
Partizan	2024–25	Serbian SuperLiga	5	0	1	0	4	0	10	0
Riga (loan)	2025	Latvian Higher League	27	4	3	1	6 (Note: Appearances in UEFA Conference League)	0	36	5
Sparta Prague	2025–26	Czech First League	6	1	1	0	—		7	1
Career total			1271	19	9	2	30	1	166	22

=== International ===
As of match played 31 March 2026

Appearances and goals by national team and year
National team	Year	Apps	Goals
Peru	2023	4	0
Peru	2024	4	1
Peru	2025	3	0
Peru	2026	2	0
Total		13	1
