= Aleksandar Filipović (footballer) =

Serbian footballer (born 1994)

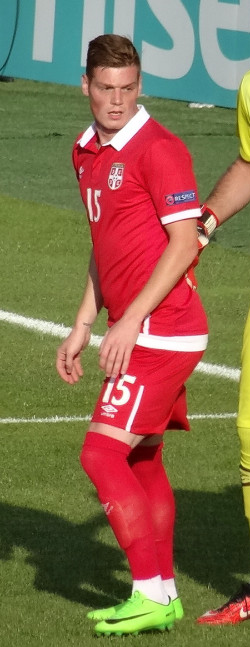
- Filipović playing for Serbia at the 2017 UEFA European Under-21 Championship

Personal information
- Full name: Aleksandar Filipović
- Date of birth: 20 December 1994 (age 31)
- Place of birth: Leskovac, FR Yugoslavia
- Height: 1.84 m (6 ft 1/2 in)
- Position: Defender

Team information
- Current team: RFS

Youth career
- Dubočica
- Jagodina

Senior career*
Years	Team	Apps	(Gls)
2011–2016	Jagodina	78	(2)
2016–2017	Voždovac	46	(4)
2018–2022	BATE Borisov	118	(6)
2022–2025	Partizan	68	(8)
2025–	RFS	41	(6)

International career^{‡}
2011	Serbia U17 (Note: Only official UEFA matches included)	3	(0)
2013	Serbia U19	8	(0)
2014–2017	Serbia U21	7	(0)
2015	Serbia U23	1	(1)
Medal record
Gold medal – first place	UEFA Under-19 Championship	2013
- * Club domestic league appearances and goals as of 12 November 2026 ‡ National team caps and goals as of 5 October 2018

Aleksandar Filipović (Serbian Cyrillic: Александар Филиповић; born 20 December 1994) is a Serbian professional footballer who plays as a defender for Latvian club RFS.

== Club career ==
On 21 May 2011, aged 16, Filipović made his senior debut for Jagodina, coming on as a late second-half substitute for Miloš Stojanović in a 4–2 away league win against Rad. He spent the next five seasons at the club before moving to Voždovac in the 2016 summer transfer window.

In early 2018, Filipović was transferred abroad to Belarusian champions BATE Borisov.

== International career ==
Filipović represented Serbia at the 2011 UEFA European Under-17 Championship. He was also a member of the winning squad at the 2013 UEFA European Under-19 Championship. Finally, Filipović represented Serbia at the 2017 UEFA European Under-21 Championship.

In November 2017, Filipović received his first call-up to the full Serbia squad by Mladen Krstajić for a friendly against South Korea.

== Statistics ==
As of 12 November 2026

Club	Season	League		Cup		Continental		Other		Total	
Club	Season	Apps	Goals	Apps	Goals	Apps	Goals	Apps	Goals	Apps	Goals
Jagodina	2010–11	2	0	0	0	—		—		2	0
Jagodina	2011–12	0	0	0	0	—		—		0	0
Jagodina	2012–13	0	0	0	0	0	0	—		0	0
Jagodina	2013–14	18	0	5	0	0	0	—		23	0
Jagodina	2014–15	23	1	3	0	2	0	—		28	1
Jagodina	2015–16	35	1	2	0	—		—		37	1
Jagodina	Total	78	2	10	0	2	0	—		90	2
Voždovac	2016–17	26	1	3	0	—		—		29	1
Voždovac	2017–18	20	3	1	0	—		—		21	3
Voždovac	Total	46	4	4	0	—		—		50	4
BATE Borisov	2018	27	1	5	0	13	0	1	0	46	1
BATE Borisov	2019	29	1	3	0	8	0	1	0	41	1
BATE Borisov	2020	27	0	4	0	1	0	0	0	32	0
BATE Borisov	2021	27	1	6	0	2	0	1	0	36	1
BATE Borisov	2022	8	3	0	0	0	0	1	0	9	3
BATE Borisov	Total	118	6	18	0	24	0	4	0	164	6
Partizan	2022–23	20	2	1	0	8	0	—		29	2
Partizan	2023–24	20	2	4	0	1	0	—		25	2
Partizan	2024–25	28	4	3	0	3	0	—		34	4
Partizan	Total	68	8	8	0	12	0	0	0	88	8
RFS	2025	11	2	2	0	3	0	0	0	16	2
RFS	2026	30	4	2	1	6	0	0	0	38	05
RFS	Total	41	6	4	1	9	0	0	0	54	7
Career total		351	26	44	1	38	0	4	0	446	27

== Honours ==
Jagodina

- Serbian Cup runner-up: 2013–14

BATE Borisov

- Belarusian Premier League: 2018
- Belarusian Cup: 2019–20, 2020–21
- Belarusian Super Cup: 2022

RFS

- Latvian Higher League: 2026

Serbia U19

- UEFA European Under-19 Championship: 2013
