= Jeh (footballer) =

Brazilian footballer

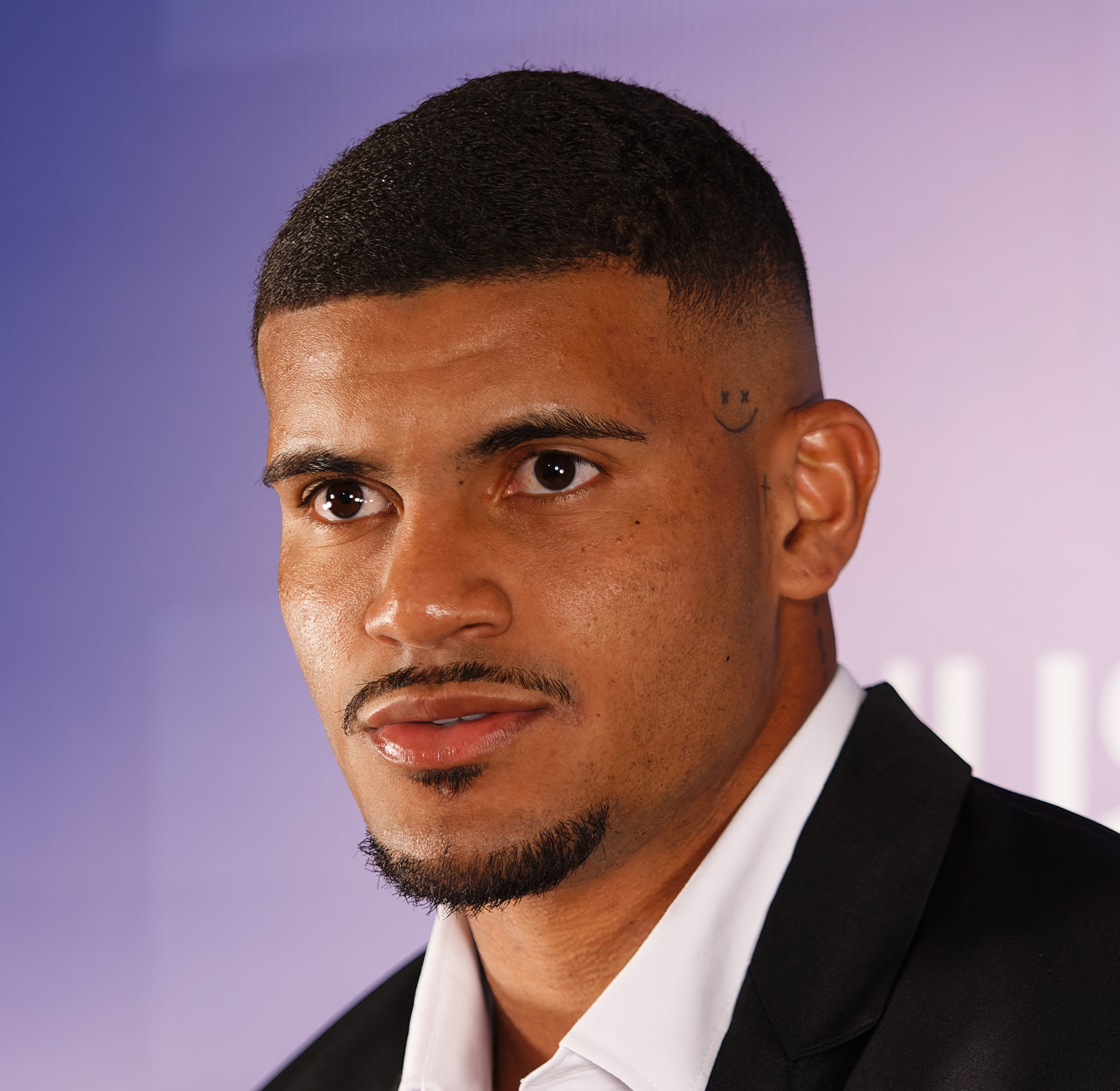
- Jeh in 2023

Personal information
- Full name: Jeferson Marinho dos Santos
- Date of birth: 24 October 1999 (age 27)
- Place of birth: São Paulo, Brazil
- Height: 1.85 m (6 ft 1 in)
- Position: Forward

Team information
- Current team: Partizan (on loan from Göztepe)
- Number: 89

Youth career
- 2019: Mauaense

Senior career*
Years	Team	Apps	(Gls)
2020–2023	Itapirense	19	(13)
2021	→ Olímpia (loan)	1	(0)
2023	→ Ponte Preta (loan)	17	(10)
2023–2026	Ponte Preta	67	(15)
2026–	Göztepe	16	(2)
2026–	→ Partizan (loan)	15	(3)
- * Club domestic league appearances and goals as of 22 November 2026

Jeferson Marinho dos Santos (born 24 October 1999), commonly known as Jeh, is a Brazilian footballer who plays as a forward for Serbian SuperLiga club Partizan, on loan from Süper Lig club Göztepe.

== Club career ==
=== Early career ===
Jeh was born in Cidade Tiradentes, a district of São Paulo, and played amateur football for most of his career, aside from a short period at Mauaense's youth categories. In 2020, he made his senior debut with Itapirense in the year's Campeonato Paulista Segunda Divisão, scoring once in just two matches.

In February 2021, Jeh moved to Campeonato Paulista Série A3 side Olímpia, but only played in a single match for the side. Back to Itapirense for the 2022 season, he became a regular starter and helped the side to achieve promotion to the Paulista A3 with 12 goals, being the top scorer of the competition.

=== Ponte Preta ===
In October 2022, Jeh joined Ponte Preta for a trial period. He officially signed for the club on 31 December, and scored four times in three matches before Ponte reached an agreement with Itapirense for a permanent deal; the agreement was announced the following 27 January.

Jeh was Ponte's top scorer in the 2023 Campeonato Paulista Série A2 with ten goals (the second-best of the competition) as the club achieved promotion as champions. On 12 April 2023, his new contract until 2027 was registered.

=== Göztepe ===
On 17 January 2026, Jeh signed an initial two-and-a-half-year deal, with the option of a third at Süper Lig side Göztepe.

==== Loan to Partizan ====
On 6 July 2026, he joined Serbian club Partizan on a 12-month loan. He scored the first goal in a 2–1 win over Getafe in the play-off round of the UEFA Conference League. On 6 September 2026, in the 180th Eternal derby, he scored a goal in the 49th second, thus setting a record for the fastest goal in derby history.

== Career statistics ==
As of 22 November 2026

Club	Season	League			State League		Cup		Continental		Other		Total	
Club	Season	Division	Apps	Goals	Apps	Goals	Apps	Goals	Apps	Goals	Apps	Goals	Apps	Goals
Itapirense	2020	Paulista 2ª Divisão	—		2	1	—		—		—		2	1
Itapirense	2022	Paulista 2ª Divisão	—		17	12	—		—		—		17	12
Itapirense	Total		—		19	13	—		—		—		19	13
Olímpia (loan)	2021	Paulista A3	—		1	0	—		—		—		1	0
Ponte Preta	2023	Série B	18	2	17	10	2	1	—		—		37	13
Ponte Preta	2024	Série B	18	7	12	4	—		—		—		30	11
Ponte Preta	2025	Série C	17	2	0	0	0	0	—		—		17	2
Ponte Preta	2026	Série B	0	0	2	0	0	0	—		—		2	0
Ponte Preta	Total		53	11	31	14	2	1	—		—		86	26
Göztepe	2025–26	Süper Lig	16	2	—		—		—		—		16	2
Partizan (loan)	2026–27	Serbian SuperLiga	15	3	—		1	1	4	1	—		20	5
Career total			84	16	51	27	3	2	4	1	0	0	142	46

== Honours ==
Ponte Preta

- Campeonato Paulista Série A2: 2023
- Campeonato Brasileiro Série C: 2025

Individual

- Campeonato Paulista Segunda Divisão Top scorer: 2022
- Campeonato Paulista Série A2 Team of the year: 2023
- Campeonato Paulista Série A2 Breakthrough player: 2023
