= 2026–27 Serbian Cup =

Tournament details
- Country: Serbia
- Teams: 36

Tournament statistics
- Matches played: 4
- Goals scored: 9 (2.25 per match)
- Top goal scorer(s): 9 players(6 teams), 1 goal

The 2026–27 Serbian Cup in sponsorship reason Mozzart bet Kup Srbije is the twentieth season of the Serbian national football cup competition. It started on 2 September 2026, and will end on 12 May 2027.

== Calendar ==
Round	Date(s)	Number of fixtures	Clubs	New entries this round
Preliminary round	2 September 2026	4	36 → 32	9
Round of 32	28 October 2026	16	32 → 16	27
Round of 16	2 December 2026	8	16 → 8	none
Quarter–finals	3 March 2027	4	8 → 4	none
Semi–finals	2 April 2027	2	4 → 2	none
Final	12 May 2026	1	2 → 1	none

== Preliminary round ==
A preliminary round was held in order to reduce the number of teams competing in the first round to 32. The draw was held on 20 August 2026 and it contained 9 teams; 5 regional cup winners(Sloven Ruma, Jedinstvo 1936, Budućnost Krušik, Mokra Gora and Teleoptik) and bottom 4 teams from 2025–26 Serbian First League(Kabel, Trayal, FAP and Ušće Novi Beograd). GFK Dubočica 1923, which would've qualify for the preliminary round by being in bottom 5 of the last season's Serbian First League, took place of financially troubled Dinamo Jug, essentially swapping places with them. Dinamo Jug didn't apply for football competitions, leaving the number of entries to the preliminary round at 9 instead of 10. The draw was conducted with the idea of minimizing expenses for the participating clubs. The round consisted of 4 single-legged ties, with a penalty shoot-out as the decider if the score was tied after 90 minutes. Teleoptik received an automatic bye to the first round proper.

2 September 2026	Sloven Ruma (III)	1–1 (4–3 p)	Kabel (III)	Ruma
16:30	Perošević 41'	Report	Pjošta 86'	Stadium: Stadion Borkovačka Dolina; Referee: Marko Bura
	Penalties
	Gajinov (penalty scored); Ćorković (penalty missed); Mojsilović (penalty scored); Bašanović (penalty scored); Maksimović (penalty scored)		(penalty scored) Tanasin; (penalty scored) Pjošta; (penalty missed) Tomić; (penalty missed) Janjić; (penalty scored) Tedić

2 September 2025	Jedinstvo 1936 (III)	3–0	Trayal (III)	Kruševac
16:30	Bogdanović 23'; Dobrosavljević 60'; Jovanović 89'	Report		Stadium: Sportski centar Jedinstvo 1936; Attendance: 100; Referee: Pavle Grujić

2 September 2025	Budućnost Krušik (III)	3–1	Ušće Novi Beograd (III)	Valjevo
16:30	Cmiljanović 34'; Aleksić 50'; Stojanović 88'	Report	Nešković 61'	Stadium: Stadion Park Pećina; Attendance: 573; Referee: Nemanja Despotović

2 September 2025	Mokra Gora (IV)	0–0 (6–7 p)	FAP (III)	Baljevac
16:30		Report		Stadium: Stadion FK Rudar; Attendance: 50; Referee: Aleksandar Gavrilović
	Penalties
	Vukomanović (penalty scored); Gvozdenović (penalty scored); Milentijević (penalty scored); Kasalović (penalty scored); Vučinić (penalty scored); Jakšić (penalty scored); Mihajlović (penalty missed)		(penalty scored) Milekić; (penalty scored) Jelić; (penalty scored) Otašević; (penalty scored) Savić; (penalty scored) Pantić; (penalty scored) Mulamuratović; (penalty scored) Stevlić

== Round of 32 ==
Jedinstvo 1936 (III)	v	Javor (II)

GFK Dubočica 1923 (II)	v	Radnički Niš

Teleoptik (II)	v	Mladost Lučani

Voždovac (II)	v	Novi Pazar

FAP (III)	v	Spartak Subotica (II)

Zemun	v	Radnički 1923

OFK Vršac (II)	v	OFK Beograd

Tekstilac Odžaci (II)	v	Železničar Pančevo

Jedinstvo Ub (II)	v	Red Star Belgrade

Mačva Šabac	v	Napredak Kruševac (II)

RFK Grafičar (II)	v	IMT MrBit

Sloven Ruma (III)	v	Vojvodina

Borac 1926 (II)	v	Radnik Surdulica

Budućnost Krušik (III)	v	Partizan

Smederevo 1924 (II)	v	TSC (II)

Loznica (II)	v	Čukarički
