= Ibrahim Zubairu =

Ghanaian footballer

Personal information
- Full name: Ibrahim Zubairu
- Date of birth: 2 June 2004 (age 22)
- Place of birth: Kumasi, Ghana
- Height: 1.75 m (5 ft 9 in)
- Position: Forward

Team information
- Current team: Partizan
- Number: 39

Youth career
- Barcelona Babies

Senior career*
Years	Team	Apps	(Gls)
2020–2022	King Faisal	47	(14)
2022–2024	Jedinstvo Ub	59	(20)
2024–	Partizan	47	(12)
2026	→ Çorum (loan)	3	(0)

International career^{‡}
2022–2024	Ghana U20	4	(1)
2023–	Ghana U23	2	(0)
- * Club domestic league appearances and goals as of 22 November 2026 ‡ National team caps and goals as of 26 October 2024

Ibrahim Zubairu (born 2 June 2004) is a Ghanaian professional footballer who plays as a forward for Serbian SuperLiga club Partizan.

== Club career ==
After starting out at Barcelona Babies, Zubairu made his senior debut for King Faisal in 2020 at age 16. He played two seasons in the Ghana Premier League, making 47 appearances and scoring 14 goals.

In September 2022, Zubairu moved to Serbia and signed with Jedinstvo Ub. He established a formidable partnership with fellow countryman Kwaku Karikari over two seasons, helping the club win promotion to the top flight for the first time in history.

In June 2024, Zubairu was transferred to Partizan for a reported fee of €500,000, signing a four-year contract. He scored his first goal for the club in a 3–2 away league loss to OFK Beograd on 15 September 2024.

He was loaned to TFF 1. Lig club Çorum in February 2026.

== International career ==
Zubairu represented Ghana at the 2023 U-23 Africa Cup of Nations.

== Career statistics ==
As of match played 22 November 2026

Appearances and goals by club, season and competition
Club	Season	League			National cup (Note: Includes Serbian Cup)		Continental		Total	
Club	Season	Division	Apps	Goals	Apps	Goals	Apps	Goals	Apps	Goals
King Faisal	2020–21	Ghana Premier League	24	7			—		24	7
King Faisal	2021–22	Ghana Premier League	23	7			—		23	7
King Faisal	Total		47	14			—		47	14
Jedinstvo Ub	2022–23	Serbian First League	24	7	—		—		24	7
Jedinstvo Ub	2023–24	Serbian First League	35	13	1	0	—		36	13
Jedinstvo Ub	Total		59	20	1	0	—		60	20
Partizan	2024–25	Serbian SuperLiga	26	9	3	2	5	0	34	11
Partizan	2025–26	Serbian SuperLiga	7	1	1	0	0	0	8	1
Partizan	2026–27	Serbian SuperLiga	14	2	1	1	3	3	18	6
Partizan	Total		47	12	5	3	8	3	60	18
Career total			153	46	6	3	8	3	167	52
