= Aleksandar Jovanović (footballer, born December 1992) =

Serbian footballer (born 1992)

Personal information
- Full name: Aleksandar Jovanović
- Date of birth: 6 December 1992 (age 33)
- Place of birth: Niš, FR Yugoslavia
- Height: 1.91 m (6 ft 3 in)
- Position: Goalkeeper

Team information
- Current team: Kocaelispor
- Number: 1

Youth career
- Radnički Niš
- 2009–2010: Rad

Senior career*
Years	Team	Apps	(Gls)
2010–2014	Rad	9	(0)
2010	→ Palilulac Beograd (loan)	2	(0)
2011–2012	→ Palić (loan)	22	(0)
2015	Donji Srem	0	(0)
2015–2016	Radnički Niš	36	(0)
2016–2018	AGF	68	(0)
2018–2020	Huesca	12	(0)
2019	→ AGF (loan)	6	(0)
2020	→ Deportivo La Coruña (loan)	1	(0)
2020–2023	Apollon Limassol	69	(0)
2023–2025	Partizan	71	(0)
2025–	Kocaelispor	18	(0)

International career^{‡}
2011–2012	Serbia U20	2	(0)
2016	Serbia	1	(0)
- * Club domestic league appearances and goals as of 18 January 2026 ‡ National team caps and goals as of 15 November 2016

Aleksandar Jovanović (Serbian Cyrillic: Александар Јовановић, pronounced [aleksǎːndar jǒʋanoʋitɕ, alěksaːn-, - joʋǎː-]; born 6 December 1992) is a Serbian professional footballer who plays as a goalkeeper for Turkish club Kocaelispor.

== Club career ==
=== Rad ===
Born in Niš, Jovanović started his professional career as a member of Rad, where he spent time from 2009 to 2014. He was later sent on loan to Palilulac Beograd and Palić. In a match against Red Star Belgrade on 3 March 2013, Jovanović made his SuperLiga debut under coach Marko Nikolić when Filip Kljajić got the red card, and Jovanović was substituted in from the bench. After the 2013–14 season, Jovanović spent as a reserve for Filip Kljajić and Branislav Danilović, Jovanović started 2014–15 as the first-choice goalkeeper of coach Milan Milanović. However, after several games and some bad reactions, Jovanović left the club during the winter break off-season.

=== Radnički Niš ===
After a short episode with Donji Srem, Jovanović returned in Radnički Niš in summer 2015 to succeed Milan Borjan in front of goal. He signed two-year contract with the club where he passed his youth career. After just eight conceded goals on eighteen matches, Partizan has expressed interest in him.

=== AGF ===
In summer 2016, Jovanović moved to Denmark and signed four-year contract with AGF. On 17 July 2016, he officially debuted for the club in a 2016–17 Danish Superliga match against SønderjyskE, played on 17 July 2016. A collision with teammate Dino Mikanović during the fourth match against Esbjerg led Jovanović to suffer a head injury and came out as a substitute. In May 2017, Jovanović made a record, playing without conceded goal for 423 minutes in the Danish Superliga.

=== Huesca and loan moves ===
On 28 August 2018, Jovanović signed a three-year contract with La Liga club SD Huesca. On 15 September 2020, he terminated his contract with the club.

On the last day of the 2019 summer transfer market, Jovanović returned to AGF on a loan deal for the rest of 2019 season. On 31 January 2020, Jovanović moved to fellow Segunda División club Deportivo de La Coruña on loan until June.

=== Later career ===
On 29 June 2023, Partizan completed the transfer of Jovanović from Apollon Limassol in the amount of €450,000.

Jovanović made his debut on 6 August in the second round of the Serbian SuperLiga in a 0–2 victory against Vojvodina at Karađorđe Stadium. In the two-legged tie against Sabah during the third qualifying round of 2023–24 UEFA Europa Conference League, he was the team's best goalkeeper in a 2–0 defeat in Azerbaijan, saving a penalty and made several other saves as well as prevented Partizan's heavy defeat. In the rematch in Belgrade after 90–120 minutes of football and five penalties, Jovanović saved Namiq Ələsgərov's shot in the last penalty series twice - because the attempt was repeated due to earlier leaving the goal line. On 20 December, Partizan defeated Red Star 2–1 in the 171st Eternal derby with Jovanović as the man of the match, making six saves in total and helping coach Duljaj's team get the derby win.

On 9 March 2024, in the second Eternal derby of the season which ended 2–2. Jovanović recorded eight saves and was declared the best player of the 24th round of the Serbian SuperLiga.

== International career ==
Jovanović received his first call-up to the Serbian senior squad for a friendly match against Russia on 5 June 2016. In May 2018, he was named in Serbia's preliminary squad for the 2018 FIFA World Cup in Russia.

== Career statistics ==
=== Club ===
As of match played 26 June 2026

Appearances and goals by club, season and competition
Club	Season	League			Cup		Continental		Other		Total	
Club	Season	Division	Apps	Goals	Apps	Goals	Apps	Goals	Apps	Goals	Apps	Goals
Rad	2009–10	Serbian SuperLiga	0	0	0	0	—		—		0	0
Rad	2010–11	Serbian SuperLiga	0	0	0	0	—		—		0	0
Rad	2011–12	Serbian SuperLiga	0	0	0	0	0	0	—		0	0
Rad	2012–13	Serbian SuperLiga	2	0	0	0	—		—		2	0
Rad	2013–14	Serbian SuperLiga	0	0	0	0	—		0	0	0	0
Rad	2014–15	Serbian SuperLiga	7	0	0	0	—		—		7	0
Rad	Total		9	0	0	0	0	0	0	0	9	0
Palilulac Beograd (loan)	2010–11	Serbian League Belgrade	2	0	—		—		—		2	0
Palić (loan)	2011–12	Serbian League Vojvodina	22	0	—		—		—		22	0
Donji Srem	2014–15	Serbian SuperLiga	0	0	—		—		—		0	0
Radnički Niš	2015–16	Serbian SuperLiga	36	0	3	0	—		—		39	0
AGF	2016–17	Danish Superliga	30	0	0	0	—		4 (Note: Appearances in the relegation play-offs)	0	34	0
AGF	2017–18	Danish Superliga	31	0	0	0	—		1 (Note: Appearance in the European play-off final match)	0	32	0
AGF	2018–19	Danish Superliga	7	0	—		—		—		7	0
AGF	Total		68	0	0	0	—		5	0	73	0
Huesca	2018–19	La Liga	12	0	0	0	—		—		12	0
AGF (loan)	2019–20	Danish Superliga	6	0	4	0	—		—		10	0
Deportivo de La Coruña (loan)	2019–20	Segunda División	1	0	0	0	—		—		1	0
Apollon Limassol	2020–21	Cypriot First Division	11	0	—		—		—		11	0
Apollon Limassol	2021–22	Cypriot First Division	27	0	2	0	2	0	—		31	0
Apollon Limassol	2022–23	Cypriot First Division	31	0	1	0	9	0	0	0	41	0
Apollon Limassol	Total		69	0	3	0	11	0	0	0	83	0
Partizan	2023–24	Serbian SuperLiga	34	0	3	0	4	0	—		41	0
Partizan	2024–25	Serbian SuperLiga	37	0	3	0	6	0	—		46	0
Partizan	Total		71	0	6	0	10	0	0	0	87	0
Kocaelispor	2025–26	Süper Lig	18	0	1	0	—		—		19	0
Career total			317	0	17	0	21	0	5	0	357	0

=== International ===
As of 15 November 2016

Appearances and goals by national team and year
National team	Year	Apps	Goals
Serbia	2016	1	0
Total		1	0

== Honours ==
Individual

- Serbian SuperLiga Team of the Season: 2023–24
- Serbian SuperLiga Player of the Week: 2024–25 (Round 7)
