= Dušan Žagar =

Serbian footballer (born 2006)

Personal information
- Date of birth: 28 October 2006 (age 20)
- Place of birth: Belgrade, Serbia
- Height: 1.71 m (5 ft 7 in)
- Position: Winger

Team information
- Current team: Real Salt Lake
- Number: 28

Youth career
- –2023: Crvena zvezda
- 2023–2024: FK 011
- 2024―2026: IMT

Senior career*
Years	Team	Apps	(Gls)
2025–2026	IMT	42	(3)
2026–	Real Salt Lake	0	(0)
- * Club domestic league appearances and goals as of 17 October 2026

Dušan Žagar (Serbian Cyrillic: Душан Жагар; born 28 October 2006) is a Serbian professional footballer who plays as a winger for Real Salt Lake.

== Early life ==
Žagar was born on 28 October 2006. Born in Belgrade, Serbia, he is a native of the city.

== Career ==
As a youth player, Žagar joined the youth academy of Crvena zvezda. Following his stint there, he joined the youth academy of FK 011 in 2023.

One year later, he joined the youth academy of IMT, where he played in the UEFA Youth League and was promoted to the club's senior team in 2025, where he wore the number ten jersey and played under Serbian manager Zoran Popović and received interest from Partizan.

During the 2024–25 season, he made twenty-five appearances and scored fourteen goals while playing for the Traktoristi under-19 team. Subsequently, he signed for American side Real Salt Lake in 2026.

== Style of play ==
Žagar plays as a winger and is right-footed. Serbian newspaper Kurir wrote in 2026 that "analytics for him say that as a right-footed player he plays on the left side of the attack, is characterized by good entry into the middle on the stronger leg, speed and control of the ball in "one-on-one" situations".
