= Marko Kerkez =

Serbian footballer (born 2005)

Personal information
- Date of birth: 26 June 2000 (age 26)
- Place of birth: Vrbas, FR Yugoslavia
- Height: 1.84 m (6 ft 0 in)
- Position: Left-back

Team information
- Current team: Mladost Lučani
- Number: 77

Youth career
- 2017–2018: SC Columbia Floridsdorf
- 2018: SV Gablitz
- 2018–2019: Győri ETO
- 2017–2018: Rad
- 2021: Győri ETO

Senior career*
Years	Team	Apps	(Gls)
2021–2023	Kabel	19	(0)
2022	→ Stanišić (loan)		
2023	Vojvodina	0	(0)
2023	→ Mladost Novi Sad (loan)	16	(0)
2024	Spartak Subotica	9	(0)
2024	Partizan	1	(0)
2025	Aris	1	(0)
2025	Fortuna Sittard	3	(0)
2026	Aris	0	(0)
2026–	Mladost Lučani	0	(0)
- * Club domestic league appearances and goals as of 14:15, 11 September 2026 (UTC)

Marko Kerkez (Serbian Cyrillic: Марко Керкез; born 26 June 2000) is a Serbian professional footballer who plays as a left-back for Serbian Superliga club Mladost Lučani.

== Club career ==
Kerkez is a product of the youth academies of SC Columbia Floridsdorf, SV Gablitz, Győri ETO, and Rad. He began his senior career in the Serbian First League with Kabel in 2021, before going on loan to their partner club Stanišić in 2022. In June 2023, Kerkez signed with Vojvodina, but was immediately loaned out to Mladost Novi Sad. On 7 February 2024, he moved to Spartak Subotica. On 15 September 2024, he transferred to Serbian SuperLiga side Partizan. Kerkez made one controversial appearance as a substitute for Partizan under coach Savo Milošević in a 3–0 Serbian SuperLiga win over FK Jedinstvo Ub on 30 November 2024; Milošević was prohibited from playing Kerkez due to politics within the club, after which Milošević decided to resign as manager.

On 28 January 2025, Kerkez joined Super League Greece club Aris on a free transfer. He moved to the Netherlands on 30 July 2025, signing for Eredivisie club Fortuna Sittard on a one-year contract with an option for a further year. His contract with Fortuna Sittard was terminated by mutual consent on 5 January 2026, having made limited appearances during his six months at the club.

After his contract with Fortuna Sittard ended, on January 13, he came back to Aris Thessaloniki, signing a contract until summer 2027.

== Personal life ==
Kerkez is the older brother of the footballer Milos Kerkez. Born in Serbia, he is of Hungarian descent through a grandmother.
