= Aleks Zeković =

Montenegrin footballer (born 2006)

Personal information
- Date of birth: 16 November 2006 (age 20)
- Place of birth: Cholet, France
- Height: 1.85 m (6 ft 1 in)
- Position: Midfielder

Team information
- Current team: Partizan
- Number: 8

Youth career
- –2022: Cholet
- 2022–2024: Angers
- 2024–2026: Feyenoord

Senior career*
Years	Team	Apps	(Gls)
2024	Angers B	9	(0)
2026–	Partizan	9	(0)

International career^{‡}
2024	Montenegro U19	5	(1)
2026–	Montenegro U21	3	(0)
- * Club domestic league appearances and goals as of 28 October 2026 ‡ National team caps and goals as of 13 November 2026

Aleks Zeković (Montenegrin: Алекс Зековић; born 16 November 2006) is a professional footballer who plays as a midfielder for Partizan. Born in Cholet, France, he is a Montenegro youth international.

== Early life ==
Zeković was born on 16 November 2006. Born in Cholet, France, he is the younger brother of French football manager Nenad Zeković. Growing up, he started playing football at the age of four.

== Club career ==
As a youth player, Zeković joined the youth academy of French side Cholet. Following his stint there, he joined the youth academy of Angers in France in 2022 and was promoted to the club's reserve team in 2024, where he made nine league appearances and scored zero goals.

Subsequently, he joined the youth academy of Dutch outfit Feyenoord. Ahead of the 2026–27 season, he signed for Partizan in Serbia, where he played under Serbia international Saša Ilić, who was the club's manager. On 2 August 2026, he received a red card while playing for them during a 1–2 home loss to IMT in the league.

== International career ==
Zeković has represented Montenegro internationally at youth level and has represented the country internationally at under-19 and under-21 level and is eligible France internationally, having been born in the country. Altogether, he made five appearances and scored zero goals while playing for the Montenegro national under-19 football team.

During the autumn of 2024, he played for the Montenegro national under-19 football team for 2025 UEFA European Under-19 Championship qualification. Two years later, he played for the Montenegro national under-21 football team for 2027 UEFA European Under-21 Championship qualification.

== Style of play ==
Zeković plays as a midfielder and is right-footed. Serbian news website Sportske.net wrote in 2026 "standing 185 centimeters tall, he is capable of playing multiple roles in the midfield".
