= Demba Seck =

Senegalese footballer

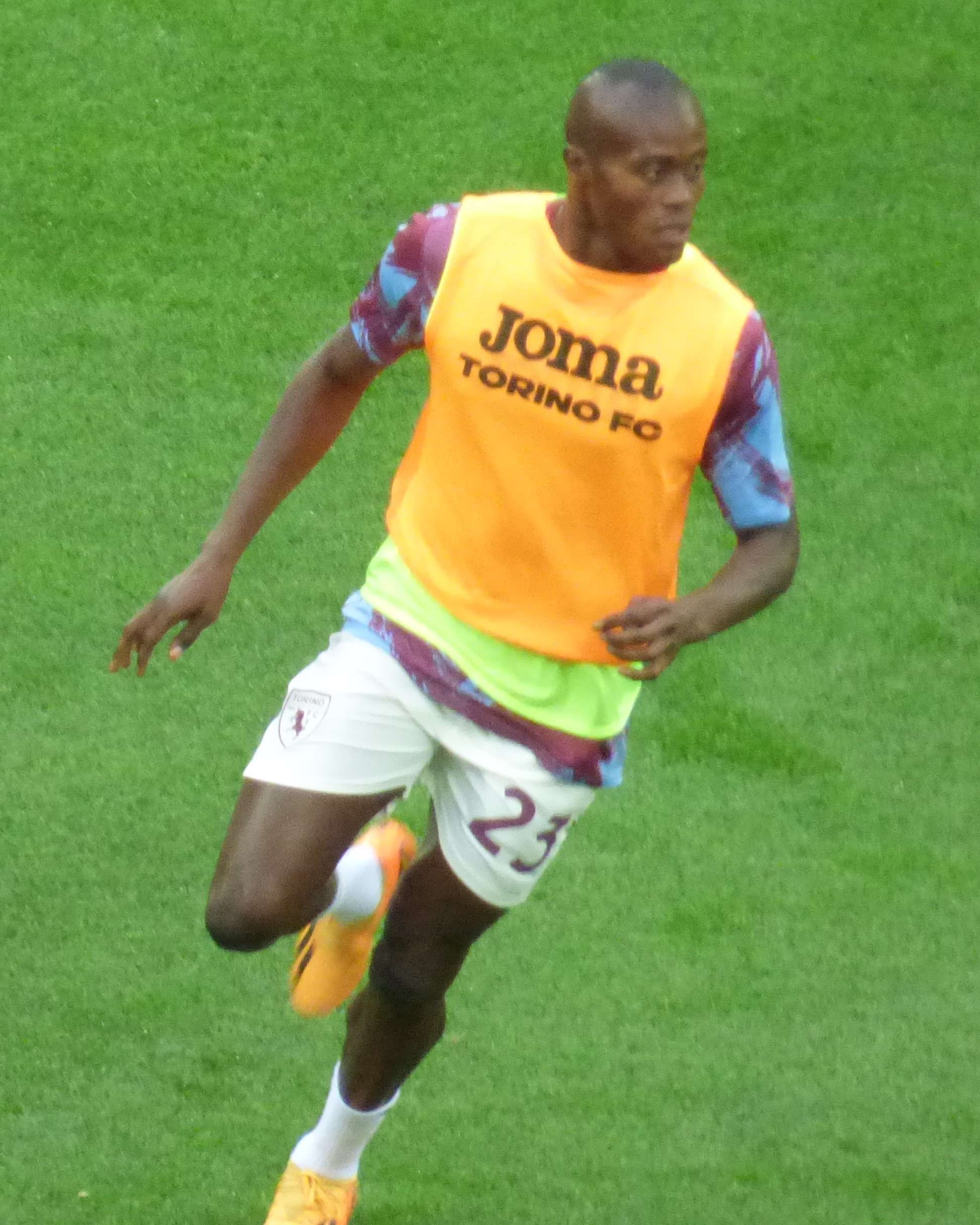
- Seck with Torino in 2023

Personal information
- Date of birth: 10 February 2001 (age 25)
- Place of birth: Ziguinchor, Senegal
- Height: 1.90 m (6 ft 3 in)
- Position: Winger

Team information
- Current team: Partizan
- Number: 19

Youth career
- –2020: SPAL
- 2018–2019: → Imolese

Senior career*
Years	Team	Apps	(Gls)
2019–2022	SPAL	25	(1)
2019–2020	→ Sasso Marconi (loan)	24	(5)
2022–2026	Torino	34	(0)
2024	→ Frosinone (loan)	11	(0)
2024–2025	→ Catanzaro (loan)	18	(0)
2025–2026	→ Partizan (loan)	35	(6)
2026–	Partizan	11	(3)

International career
2022	Senegal	1	(0)
- * Club domestic league appearances and goals as of 22 November 2026

Demba Seck (born 10 February 2001) is a Senegalese professional footballer who plays as a winger for Serbian SuperLiga club Partizan. He has also played for the Senegal national football team.

== Club career ==
Seck was raised in the youth system of SPAL and started his senior career in the 2019–20 season in Serie D, on loan at Sasso Marconi.

On 31 January 2022, Seck signed with Serie A club Torino.

On 23 January 2024, Seck was loaned to Frosinone.

In August 2024, Seck joined Serie B club Catanzaro on a season-long loan deal with an option to buy.

== Personal life ==
Born in Senegal, Seck moved to Italy at an early age to join his father who was living and working in Massa Lombarda at the time.

In January 2023, Seck was formally reported for revenge porn by an Italian woman; the news became public in September 2023. After the news became public, another woman successively reported him.
