= Sidney Lima =

Brazilian footballer

Personal information
- Full name: Sidney Alexssander Pena de Lima
- Date of birth: 17 January 1997 (age 29)
- Place of birth: Americana, Brazil
- Height: 1.82 m (6 ft 0 in)
- Position: Centre-back

Team information
- Current team: Partizan (on loan from Santa Clara)
- Number: 21

Youth career
- Ituano

Senior career*
Years	Team	Apps	(Gls)
2016	Primavera	1	(0)
2017	Serra Branca	3	(0)
2017	América-SP	17	(1)
2017	ABECAT Ouvidorense	6	(0)
2018–2021	Felgueiras	59	(9)
2021–2023	Feirense	54	(2)
2023–	Santa Clara	84	(5)
2026–	→ Partizan (loan)	7	(1)
- * Club domestic league appearances and goals as of 17:30, 22 November 2026 (UTC)

Sidney Alexssander Pena de Lima (born 17 January 1997) is a Brazilian professional footballer who plays as a centre-back for Serbian SuperLiga club Partizan, on loan from Primeira Liga club Santa Clara.

== Club career ==
Sidney Lima is a youth product of the Brazilian club Ituano. He began his senior career with Primavera in 2016, and followed that up with short stints at Serra Branca and América-SP. In 2018, he moved to Portugal with Felgueiras 1932 where he stayed for 3 seasons. He moved to Feirense in the summer of 2021.

On 27 June 2023, Sidney Lima transferred to Santa Clara on a 2+1 year contract, and on his debut season won the 2023–24 Liga Portugal 2 with them. He made his professional debut with Santa Clara in a 4–1 Primeira Liga win over Estoril on 11 August 2024.

== Career statistics ==
As of match played 10 August 2026

Appearances and goals by club, season and competition
Club	Season	League			State league		Cup		League cup		Continental		Total	
Club	Season	Division	Apps	Goals	Apps	Goals	Apps	Goals	Apps	Goals	Apps	Goals	Apps	Goals
Primavera	2016	Paulista	0	0	1	0	—		—		—		1	0
Serra Branca	2017	Paraibano	0	0	3	0	—		—		—		3	0
America-SP	2017	Paulista Sub-23 2ª Divisão	—		17	1	—		—		—		17	1
Felgueiras	2018–19	Campeonato de Portugal	13	2	—		—		—		—		13	2
Felgueiras	2019–20	Campeonato de Portugal	23	1	—		—		—		—		23	1
Felgueiras	2020–21	Campeonato de Portugal	23	6	—		—		—		—		23	6
Felgueiras	Total		59	9	—		—		—		—		59	9
Feirense	2021–22	Liga Portugal 2	26	1	—		2	0	1	0	—		29	1
Feirense	2022–23	Liga Portugal 2	28	1	—		0	0	4	0	—		32	1
Feirense	Total		54	2	—		2	0	5	0	—		61	2
Santa Clara	2023–24	Liga Portugal 2	21	1	—		3	0	1	0	—		25	1
Santa Clara	2024–25	Primeira Liga	31	3	—		3	0	1	0	—		35	3
Santa Clara	2025–26	Primeira Liga	31	1	—		2	0	1	0	5 (Note: Appearances in UEFA Conference League)	0	39	1
Santa Clara	2026–27	Primeira Liga	1	0	—		0	0	0	0	—		1	0
Santa Clara	Total		84	5	—		8	0	3	0	7	0	100	5
Career total			197	16	21	1	10	0	8	0	7	0	241	17

== Honours ==
Santa Clara

- Liga Portugal 2: 2023–24
