= Stefan Kovač =

Bosnian footballer

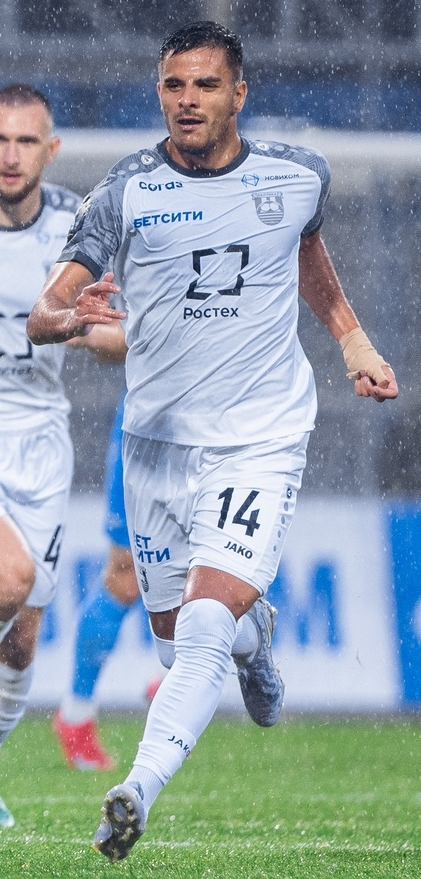

Personal information
- Date of birth: 14 January 1999 (age 27)
- Place of birth: Belgrade, FR Yugoslavia
- Height: 1.85 m (6 ft 1 in)
- Position: Midfielder

Team information
- Current team: Baltika Kaliningrad
- Number: 14

Youth career
- 2007–2017: Red Star Belgrade

Senior career*
Years	Team	Apps	(Gls)
2018	Red Star Belgrade	0	(0)
2018	→ IMT (loan)	26	(9)
2019–2024	Čukarički	155	(14)
2024–2025	Partizan	29	(4)
2025–	Baltika Kaliningrad	8	(0)

International career^{‡}
2015–2016	Bosnia and Herzegovina U17	9	(1)
2017–2018	Bosnia and Herzegovina U19	3	(0)
2020	Bosnia and Herzegovina U21	2	(1)
- * Club domestic league appearances and goals as of 18 October 2026 ‡ National team caps and goals as of 17 November 2020

Stefan Kovač (Serbian Cyrillic: Стефан Ковач; pronounced [stěfaːn kǒʋaːtʃ]; born 14 January 1999) is a Bosnian professional footballer who plays as a midfielder for Russian club Baltika Kaliningrad.

== Club career ==
=== Early career ===
Kovač came through youth academy of his hometown club Red Star Belgrade, which he left in January 2019 to join Čukarički. He made his professional debut against Voždovac on 24 February at the age of 20. On 1 May, he scored a brace in a triumph over Napredak Kruševac, which were his first professional goals.

=== Baltika Kaliningrad ===
On 30 May 2025, Kovač signed a five-year contract with Russian Premier League club Baltika Kaliningrad.

== International career ==
Kovač represented Bosnia and Herzegovina at all youth levels.

== Career statistics ==
As of 29 October 2026

Appearances and goals by club, season and competition
Club	Season	League			National Cup		Continental		Total	
Club	Season	Division	Apps	Goals	Apps	Goals	Apps	Goals	Apps	Goals
IMT	2017–18	Serbian League Belgrade	12	5	—		—		12	5
IMT	2018–19	Serbian League Belgrade	14	4	—		—		14	4
IMT	Total		26	9	—		—		26	9
Čukarički	2018–19	Serbian SuperLiga	9	2	—		—		9	2
Čukarički	2019–20	Serbian SuperLiga	29	1	3	0	4 (Note: Four appearances and one goal in UEFA Europa League qualifying)	1	36	2
Čukarički	2020–21	Serbian SuperLiga	30	3	2	1	—		32	4
Čukarički	2021–22	Serbian SuperLiga	30	3	1	0	4 (Note: Four appearances in UEFA Europa Conference League qualifying)	0	35	3
Čukarički	2022–23	Serbian SuperLiga	25	1	1	0	4 (Note: Four appearances and three goals in UEFA Europa Conference League qualifying)	3	30	4
Čukarički	2023–24	Serbian SuperLiga	28	3	2	1	7 (Note: Two appearances in UEFA Europa Conference League qualifying and five appearances in UEFA Europa League group stage)	0	37	4
Čukarički	2024–25	Serbian SuperLiga	4	1	0	0	—		4	1
Čukarički	Total		155	14	9	2	19	4	183	20
Partizan	2024–25	Serbian SuperLiga	29	4	2	1	2	0	33	5
Baltika Kaliningrad	2025–26	Russian Premier League	7	0	6	0	—		13	0
Baltika Kaliningrad	2026–27	Russian Premier League	1	0	5	0	—		6	0
Baltika Kaliningrad	Total		8	0	11	0	0	0	19	0
Career total			218	27	22	3	21	4	261	34

== Honours ==
Individual

- Serbian SuperLiga Player of the Week: 2024–25 (Round 3)
