= Marko Lekić =

Serbian basketball player

Personal information
- Born: 19 February 1985 (age 41) Valjevo, SR Serbia, Yugoslavia
- Listed height: 2.11 m (6 ft 11 in)
- Listed weight: 109 kg (240 lb)

Career information
- NBA draft: 2007: undrafted
- Playing career: 2002–2011
- Position: Center
- Number: 6, 11, 21, 25

Career history
- 2002–2003: Partizan
- 2003–2004: Spartak
- 2004–2006: Atlas Belgrade
- 2006–2008: Vojvodina Srbijagas
- 2008: Crvena zvezda
- 2008–2009: Geoplin Slovan
- 2009–2010: Budućnost
- 2010: Kryvbas
- 2010–2011: Helios Suns
- 2011: AZS Koszalin

Marko Lekić (Serbian Cyrillic: Марко Лекић; born 19 February 1985) is a Serbian former professional basketball player.

== Professional career ==
A center, Milošević played for Partizan, Spartak, Atlas Belgrade, and Vojvodina Srbijagas prior he joined Crvena zvezda in January 2008. Afterwards, he played for Slovan, Budućnost, Kryvbas, Helios Suns, and AZS Koszalin.
