= Mateja Stjepanović =

Serbian footballer (born 2004)

Personal information
- Full name: Mateja Stjepanović
- Date of birth: 20 February 2004 (age 22)
- Place of birth: Belgrade, Serbia and Montenegro
- Height: 1.85 m (6 ft 1 in)
- Position: Defensive midfielder

Team information
- Current team: Moreirense
- Number: 8

Youth career
- FK Trijumf
- 2019–2023: Partizan

Senior career*
| Years | Team | Apps | (Gls) |
| 2023–2025 | Partizan | 24 | (0) |
| 2025– | Moreirense | 40 | (1) |

International career^{‡}
| 2019 | Serbia U15 | 3 | (0) |
| 2019–2020 | Serbia U16 | 6 | (0) |
| 2020–2021 | Serbia U17 | 3 | (0) |
| 2021 | Serbia U18 | 4 | (0) |
| 2022–2023 | Serbia U19 | 7 | (1) |
| 2024– | Serbia U21 | 7 | (0) |
- * Club domestic league appearances and goals as of 20 November 2026 ‡ National team caps and goals as of 17 November 2026

Mateja Stjepanović (Serbian Cyrillic: Матеја Стјепановић; born 20 February 2004) is a Serbian professional footballer who plays as a defensive midfielder for Moreirense.

== Club career ==
He began training as a five-year-old at the Trijumf football school in Sremčica, and three years later joined Partizan's youth teams. He signed his first professional contract with the club in January 2020. He was on the roster for the Serbian Cup round of 16 match against Radnički SM in Sremska Mitrovica in late September 2022. He was then called up for winter training with the first team, while on the last day of January 2023 he extended his contract for another four years. He sat on the first team bench several times during the rest of the season, while as captain he led the team that won the Serbian Youth League title. Igor Duljaj announced him in the squad for the final round of the Serbian SuperLiga in the 2022–23 competition. Stjepanović made his debut by entering the game at half-time of the match together with Siniša Saničanin, and on the field they replaced Danilo Pantić and bonus player Mihajlo Ilić.

== International career ==
Stjepanović was invited to the Serbian youth national team for the "Vlatko Marković" Tournament held in Medulin in 2019. At the age of 16, he played in the "Put zvezda" tournament in Moscow, while he made his debut for the cadet selection in a double match against his peers from Bulgaria. For the younger youth team, he played double matches against the teams of Slovenia and Italy. He made his debut for the youth national team in the first round of the "Stevan Vilotić Ćele" Memorial Tournament in 2022, against Finland. In the final match, a few days later, he scored a goal against France. He also played in the qualifications for the European Championship.
