= Mihailo Cmiljanović =

Serbian footballer

Personal information
- Date of birth: 15 June 1994 (age 32)
- Place of birth: Prijepolje, FR Yugoslavia
- Height: 1.80 m (5 ft 11 in)
- Position: Left-back

Team information
- Current team: Igalo
- Number: 5

Youth career
- Sloga Kraljevo

Senior career*
Years	Team	Apps	(Gls)
2011–2014	Sloga Kraljevo	13	(0)
2013	→ Polimlje (loan)		
2015	Alemannia Haibach	23	(3)
2016	Polimlje		
2016–2017	Viktoria Griesheim		
2017–2018	Kolubara		
2019	Tatran Prešov	13	(1)
2019–2021	Příbram	58	(0)
2022	Bardejov	13	(4)
2022-2024	Leotar	55	(6)
2024	Humenné	5	(1)
2025-	Igalo	5	(0)
- * Club domestic league appearances and goals as of 4 April 2025

Mihailo Cmiljanović (Serbian Cyrillic: Михаило Цмиљановић; born 15 June 1994) is a Serbian footballer who plays as a left-back, for Igalo, in the Montenegrin Second League.
