= 2022–23 FK Partizan season =

FK Partizan 76th season

FK Partizan
2022–23 season
- President: Milorad Vučelić
- Head coach: Ilija Stolica (until 13 August 2022); Gordan Petrić (until 27 February 2023); Igor Duljaj
- Stadium: Partizan Stadium
- Serbian SuperLiga: 4th
- Serbian Cup: First round
- Europa League: Third qualifying round
- Europa Conference League: Knockout phase
- Top goalscorer: League: Ricardo Gomes (19); All: Ricardo Gomes (28)
- Highest home attendance: 18,568 vs Red Star Belgrade (31 August 2022)
- Lowest home attendance: 0 vs Red Star Belgrade (26 April 2023); 0 vs Novi Pazar (8 May 2023)
Home colours
- All statistics correct as of 22 May 2023.

The 2022–23 season is Fudbalski Klub Partizan's 76th season in existence and the club's 17th competing in the Serbian SuperLiga.

== Transfers ==
=== In ===
Date	Position	Name	From	Type	Ref.
15 June 2022	DF	(Serbia) Zlatan Šehović	(Israel) Maccabi Netanya	Transfer	
20 June 2022	DF	(Serbia) Aleksandar Filipović	(Belarus) BATE Borisov	Transfer	
23 June 2022	MF	(Cape Verde) Patrick Andrade	(Azerbaijan) Qarabağ	Free Transfer	
2 July 2022	DF	(Serbia) Svetozar Marković	(Greece) Olympiacos	Transfer	
7 July 2022	FW	(Mali) Fousseni Diabaté	(Turkey) Trabzonspor	Free Transfer	
11 July 2022	MF	(Serbia) Kristijan Belić	(Serbia) Čukarički	Free Transfer	
2 August 2022	FW	(Serbia) Andrija Pavlović	(Denmark) Brøndby IF	Free Transfer	
24 August 2022	MF	(Mali) Hamidou Traoré	(Turkey) Giresunspor	Transfer	
2 February 2023	MF	(Colombia) Andrés Colorado	(Colombia) Cortuluá	Loan	

=== Out ===
Date	Position	Name	To	Type	Ref.
14 June 2022	DF	(Serbia) Ivan Obradović		Released	
14 June 2022	MF	(Serbia) Miloš Jojić		Released	
16 June 2022	GK	(Serbia) Lazar Slavković	(Serbia) Novi Pazar	Free Transfer	
27 June 2022	DF	(Serbia) Nemanja Miletić	(Cyprus) Omonia	Free Transfer	
28 June 2022	MF	(Serbia) Milan Smiljanić	(Montenegro) Mornar	Free Transfer	
6 July 2022	MF	(Serbia) Marko Jevtović	(Turkey) Gaziantep	Free Transfer	
11 July 2022	FW	(Serbia) Marko Milovanović	(Spain) Almería	Transfer	
12 July 2022	DF	(Serbia) Bojan Ostojić	(Serbia) Teleoptik	Free Transfer	
13 July 2022	MF	(Serbia) Miljan Momčilović	(Serbia) Novi Pazar	Free Transfer	
20 July 2022	FW	(Serbia) Lazar Marković	(Turkey) Gaziantep	Free Transfer	
28 July 2022	MF	(Serbia) Saša Zdjelar	(Russia) CSKA Moscow	Transfer	
29 July 2022	FW	(Hungary) Filip Holender	(Hungary) Vasas	Free Transfer	
13 August 2022	DF	(Serbia) Aleksandar Miljković	(Armenia) Pyunik	Free Transfer	
15 August 2022	MF	(Serbia) Lazar Pavlović	(Cyprus) AEL Limassol	Free Transfer	
12 September 2022	DF	(Serbia) Rajko Brežančić	(Serbia) Radnički Beograd	Free Transfer	
23 September 2022	DF	(Serbia) Mateja Stašević	(Serbia) Teleoptik	Loan	
23 September 2022	MF	(Serbia) Nikola Lakčević	(Serbia) Teleoptik	Loan	
2 January 2023	FW	(Serbia) Nikola Terzić	(Turkey) Bandırmaspor	Loan	
31 January 2023	LW	(Serbia) Vanja Vlahović	(Italy) Atalanta Primavera	Loan	
6 February 2023	RW	(Serbia) Aleksandar Lutovac	(Austria) SV Ried	Free Transfer	
16 February 2023	RW	(Serbia) Marko Brnović	(Montenegro) Arsenal Tivat	Loan	

== Players ==
=== Squad ===
No.	Name	Nationality	Position (s)	Date of Birth (Age)	Signed from	Notes
Goalkeepers
25	Milan Lukač	(Serbia)	GK	4 October 1985 (age 39)	(Turkey) Akhisarspor	
41	Aleksandar Popović	(Serbia)	GK	29 September 1999 (age 25)	Youth system	
85	Nemanja Stevanović	(Serbia)	GK	8 May 1992 (age 33)	(Serbia) Čukarički	
Defenders
3	Mihajlo Ilić	(Serbia)	CB	4 June 2003 (age 22)	Youth system	
4	Siniša Saničanin	(Bosnia and Herzegovina)	CB	24 April 1995 (age 30)	(Serbia) Vojvodina	
5	Igor Vujačić	(Montenegro)	CB	8 August 1994 (age 30)	(Montenegro) Zeta	
6	Svetozar Marković	(Serbia)	CB	23 March 2000 (age 25)	(Greece) Olympiacos	
12	Zlatan Šehović	(Serbia)	LB	8 August 2000 (age 24)	(Israel) Maccabi Netanya	
17	Marko Živković	(Serbia)	RB	17 May 1994 (age 31)	(Serbia) Voždovac	
26	Aleksandar Filipović	(Serbia)	LB	20 December 1994 (age 30)	(Belarus) Bate Borisov	
72	Slobodan Urošević	(Serbia)	LB	15 April 1994 (age 31)	(Serbia) Napredak Kruševac	Captain
Midfielders
7	Patrick Andrade	(Cape Verde)	CM	9 February 1993 (age 32)	(Azerbaijan) Qarabağ	
8	Hamidou Traoré	(Mali)	DM	7 October 1996 (age 28)	(Turkey) Giresunspor	
10	Bibras Natkho	(Israel)	CM	18 February 1988 (age 37)	(Greece) Olympiacos	Vice-captain
13	Andrés Colorado	(Colombia)	DM	1 December 1998 (age 26)	(Colombia) Cortuluá	Loan
15	Ljubomir Fejsa	(Serbia)	DM	14 August 1988 (age 36)	(Saudi Arabia) Al Ahli	
40	Kristijan Belić	(Serbia)	DM	25 March 2001 (age 24)	(Serbia) Čukarički	
45	Mateja Stjepanović	(Serbia)	DM	20 February 2004 (age 21)	Youth system	
55	Danilo Pantić	(Serbia)	MF	26 October 1996 (age 28)	(England) Chelsea	
Forwards
9	Queensy Menig	(Netherlands)	RW	19 August 1995 (age 29)	(Netherlands) Twente	
11	Ricardo Gomes	(Cape Verde)	CF	18 December 1991 (age 33)	(United Arab Emirates) Sharjah FC	
14	Samed Baždar	(Serbia)	CF	31 January 2004 (age 21)	Youth system	
18	Fousseni Diabaté	(Mali)	RW	18 October 1995 (age 29)	(Turkey) Trabzonspor	
20	Andrija Pavlović	(Serbia)	CF	16 November 1993 (age 31)	(Denmark) Brøndby IF	
29	Nemanja Ilić	(Serbia)	LW	20 April 2005 (age 20)	Youth system	
38	Janko Jevremović	(Serbia)	RW	14 July 2004 (age 21)	Youth system	
43	Nemanja Trifunović	(Serbia)	LW	29 June 2004 (age 21)	Youth system	
44	Bogdan Mirčetić	(Serbia)	RW	25 October 2005 (age 19)	Youth system	
77	Nemanja Jović	(Serbia)	FW / LW	8 August 2002 (age 22)	Youth system	
90	Mihajlo Petković	(Serbia)	LW	27 May 2004 (age 21)	Youth system	

== Friendlies ==
24 June 2022 Friendly	Partizan (Serbia)	0–1	(Romania) CFR Cluj	Gornja Radgona, Slovenia
17:30		Report	Dugandžić 35'	Stadium: Gornja Radgona City Stadium

28 June 2022 Friendly	Partizan (Serbia)	3–0	(Slovakia) Spartak Trnava	Kidričevo, Slovenia
18:00	Menig 37'; Lutovac 45'; Andrade 59'	Report		Stadium: Aluminij Sports Park

2 July 2022 Friendly	Partizan (Serbia)	0–1	(Turkey) Fenerbahçe	Graz, Austria
18:30		Report	Valencia 2'	Stadium: Liebenauer Stadium; Referee:

15 November 2022 Friendly	Rudar Prijedor (Bosnia and Herzegovina)	4–2	(Serbia) Partizan	Prijedor, Bosnia and Herzegovina
13:00		Report		Stadium: Gradski stadion Referee:

15 January 2023 Friendly	Universitatea Craiova (Romania)	1–1	(Serbia) Partizan	Antalya, Turkey
13:00	Ivan 77' (pen.)	Report	Pavlović 12' (pen.)	Referee:

19 January 2023 Friendly	Akhmat Grozny (Russia)	1–3	(Serbia) Partizan	Antalya, Turkey
15:00	Oleynikov 35'	Report	Jović 5'; Vlahović 76'; Menig 81'	Referee:

20 January 2023 Friendly	Mladost Lučani (Serbia)	2–2	(Serbia) Partizan	Antalya, Turkey
15:00	Jojić 22' (pen.); Mirić 65'	Report	Ilić 17'; Jevremović 76'	Referee:

23 January 2023 Friendly	TSC (Serbia)	1–1	(Serbia) Partizan	Antalya, Turkey
09:30	Urošević 31'	Report	Kuveljić 59'	Referee:

23 January 2023 Friendly	Austria Wien	0–0	(Serbia) Partizan	Antalya, Turkey
15:30		Report		Referee:

27 January 2023 Friendly	AC Horsens (Denmark)	1–0	(Serbia) Partizan	Antalya, Turkey
09:00	Sigurðarson 53'	Report		Referee:

27 January 2023 Friendly	CSKA Moscow (Russia)	2–1	(Serbia) Partizan	Antalya, Turkey
15:00	Chalov 58'; Arbuzov 90+4'	Report	Jović 85'	Referee:

25 March 2023 Friendly	Partizan (Serbia)	0–2	(Bulgaria) CSKA 1948	Belgrade, Serbia
11:00		Report	Dikov 34', 54'	Stadium: Partizan Stadium; Referee: (Serbia) Pavle Tomić

== Competitions ==
=== Overview ===
Competition	Record							
Competition	P	W	D	L	GF	GA	GD	Win %
Serbian SuperLiga	37	21	8	8	68	34	+34	56.76
Serbian Cup	1	0	1	0	1	1	+0	0.00
UEFA Europa League	2	0	1	1	3	4	−1	0.00
UEFA Europa Conference League	10	4	4	2	18	14	+4	40.00
Total	50	25	14	11	90	53	+37	50.00

=== Serbian SuperLiga ===
==== Regular season ====
===== League table =====
Pos	Team	Pld	W	D	L	GF	GA	GD	Pts	Qualification (Note: Teams will be split into two groups (Final A and Final B) after each have played 30 matches.)
2	TSC	30	18	8	4	52	22	+30	62	Qualification for the Championship round
3	Čukarički	30	19	5	6	56	31	+25	62	Qualification for the Championship round
4	Partizan	30	17	6	7	57	28	+29	57	Qualification for the Championship round
5	Vojvodina	30	14	12	4	47	27	+20	54	Qualification for the Championship round
6	Novi Pazar	30	15	5	10	37	31	+6	50	Qualification for the Championship round

Source: SuperLiga (in Serbian)
Rules for classification: 1) Points; 2) Head-to-head points; 3) Head-to-head goal difference; 4) Head-to-head goals scored; 5) Head-to-head away goals scored (if two teams tied); 6) Goal difference; 7) Goals scored; 8) Fair play ranking; 9) Draw.

==== Results by matchday ====
Round	1	2	3	4	5	6	7	8	9	10	11	12	13	14	15	16	17	18	19	20	21	22	23	24	25	26	27	28	29	30
Ground	A	A	H	A	H	A	H	A	H	A	H	A	H	A	H	H	H	A	H	A	H	A	H	A	H	A	H	A	H	A
Result	W	D	D	L	W	W	L	W	D	W	W	W	W	W	W	D	W	W	W	W	L	W	D	L	D	W	L	L	W	L
Position	2	3	4	7	9	9	11	8	8	7	6	5	4	4	3	2	2	2	2	2	2	2	2	2	2	2	3	4	4	4

Updated to match(es) played on 21 April 2023. Source: Partizan
A = Away; H = Home; W = Win; D = Draw; L = Loss

=== Results ===
9 July 2022 1	Javor Matis	0–4	Partizan	Ivanjica
20:00	Marčić (yellow card) 35'; Gigić (yellow card) 45'; Maletić (yellow card) 86'	Report	Petković 21'; Natkho 68'; Baždar 77'; Gomes 90+3'	Stadium: Javor Stadium; Attendance: 1,700; Referee: (Serbia) Miloš Milanović

15 July 2022 2	Radnički Niš	3–3	Partizan	Niš
20:00	Mlađović 2' (yellow card) 78'; Tolordava (yellow card) 15'; Dimić 50'; Jovanović 55'; Aksentijević (yellow card) 78'; Mesarović (yellow card) 90+2'; Petrov (yellow card) 90+3'	Report	Filipović (yellow card) 4'; Natkho 12' (pen.); Urošević 71' (yellow card) 78'; Marković (yellow card) 73'; Zdjelar (yellow card) 78'; Terzić (yellow card) 78'; Vujačić (yellow card) 85'; Gomes 90+7' (pen.)	Stadium: Čair Stadium; Referee: (Serbia) Dejan Trifković

23 July 2022 3	Partizan	0–0	TSC	Belgrade
21:00	Andrade (yellow card) 86'; Gomes (yellow card) 90'	Report	Stojković (yellow card) 37'; Antonić (yellow card) 45+2'; Ilić (yellow card) 57'; Kuveljić (yellow card) 69'; Đakovac (yellow card) 74'; Tomanović (yellow card) 75'; Vukić (yellow card) 84'	Stadium: Partizan Stadium; Referee: (Serbia) Milan Mitić

29 July 2022 4	Novi Pazar	1–0	Partizan	Novi Pazar
18:55	Lončar (yellow card) 22'; Mijić 24' (pen.); Alić (yellow card) 78'	Report	Saničanin (yellow card) 15' (yellow-red card) 23'; Andrade (yellow card) 85'	Stadium: Novi Pazar City Stadium; Referee: (Serbia) Marko Ivković

20 October 2022* 5	Partizan	1–0	Napredak Kruševac	Belgrade
16:45	Vujačić 31'; Natkho (yellow card) 88'	Report	Petrić (yellow card) 57'	Stadium: Partizan Stadium; Referee: (Serbia) Pavle Tomić

14 August 2022 6	Mladost Novi Sad	0–1	Partizan	Novi Sad
19:30	Maričić (yellow card) 56'; Kovačević (yellow card) 65'; Jočić (yellow card) 84'; Maksimović (yellow card) 90+3'	Report	Živković (yellow card) 70'; Marković 90+5'	Stadium: Karađorđe Stadium; Attendance: 3,500; Referee: (Serbia) Milan Stefanović

10 November 2022* 7	Partizan	0–1	Spartak Subotica	Belgrade
16:30		Report	Bijelović (yellow card) 67' (goal) 86'; Manojlović (yellow card) 69'	Stadium: Partizan Stadium; Referee: (Serbia) Nikola Radaković

28 August 2022 8	Radnički 1923	0–1	Partizan	Kragujevac
17:00	Vlajković (yellow card) 58'; Srnić (yellow card) 74'; Jočić (yellow card) 90+1'; Vidović (red card) 90+1'	Report	Jović (yellow card) 61'; Natkho 88'	Stadium: Čika Dača Stadium; Referee: (Serbia) Srđan Jovanović

31 August 2022 9	Partizan	1–1	Red Star Belgrade	Belgrade
20:00	Vujačić (yellow card) 14'; Natkho 56' (pen.); Traoré (yellow card) 90+4'	Report	Bukari 26'; Sanogo (yellow card) 41'; Ivanić (yellow card) 49'; Milunović (yellow card) 70'; Eraković (yellow card) 81'	Stadium: Partizan Stadium; Attendance: 18,568; Referee: (Serbia) Milan Mitić

4 September 2022 10	Kolubara	1–5	Partizan	Lazarevac
18:00	Gomes 8' (o.g.)	Report	Gomes 2', 18', 38'; Natkho 32'; Belić (yellow card) 34'; Menig 52'	Stadium: Stadion FK Kolubara; Referee: (Serbia) Aleksandar Živković

11 September 2022 11	Partizan	6–0	Mladost Lučani	Belgrade
19:30	Gomes 40' (pen.), 45+1', 64'; Marković (yellow card) 54'; Vujačić 59'; Baždar 78'; Lutovac 81'; Ilić (yellow card) 84'	Report	Dunđerski (yellow card) 50'	Stadium: Partizan Stadium; Referee: (Serbia) Nikola Radaković

18 September 2022 12	Radnik Surdulica	0–2	Partizan	Surdulica
19:00	Abubakar (yellow card) 9'; Duronjić (yellow card) 13'	Report	Natkho 10' (pen.); Saničanin (yellow card) 30'; Menig 55'; Lutovac (yellow card) 76'	Stadium: Surdulica City Stadium; Referee: (Serbia) Lazar Lukić

2 October 2022 13	Partizan	4–1	Vojvodina	Belgrade
19:00	Natkho 16', 23' (pen.); Belić (yellow card) 37'; Baždar (yellow card) 51' (goal) 84'; Filipović 51'	Report	Jeličić (yellow card) 21' (yellow-red card) 27'; Bjeković (yellow card) 31'; Nikolić 83'	Stadium: Partizan Stadium; Referee: (Serbia) Milan Mitić

9 October 2022 14	Voždovac	0–4	Partizan	Belgrade
19:30		Report	Gomes 9', 23'; Menig 28'; Terzić 90'	Stadium: Voždovac Stadium; Referee: (Serbia) Dejan Trifković

16 October 2022 15	Partizan	3–2	Čukarički	Belgrade
18:30	Marković (yellow card) 37'; Belić 42'; Pavlović 47'; Gomes (yellow card) 81'; Urošević 85'; Traoré (yellow card) 88'	Report	Docić 38' (pen.) (yellow card) 85'; Tošić (yellow card) 51'; Owusu (yellow card) 64' (yellow-red card) 87'; Janković (yellow card) 72'; Drezgić 75'	Stadium: Partizan Stadium; Referee: (Serbia) Milan Stefanović

23 October 2022 16	Partizan	3–3	Javor Matis	Belgrade
19:00	Natkho 11'; Urošević 25' (yellow card) 81'; Filipović (yellow card) 30'; Živković 63'	Report	Nikolić 7'; Đukić (yellow card) 40'; Kopitović (yellow card) 63'; Gigić 71' (pen.); Janjić (yellow card) 86'; Gojković 88' (yellow card) 89'	Stadium: Partizan Stadium; Referee: (Serbia) Andrija Stojanović

30 October 2022 17	Partizan	4–0	Radnički Niš	Belgrade
19:00	Pavlović 7'; Rosić 15' (o.g.); Gomes 55'; Saničanin (yellow card) 49'; Belić (yellow card) 74'; Baždar 83' (yellow card) 84'	Report	Savić (yellow card) 21'; Đurišić (yellow card) 44'	Stadium: Partizan Stadium; Attendance: 4,000; Referee: (Serbia) Nenad Minaković

6 November 2022 18	TSC	2–3	Partizan	Bačka Topola
19:30	Ratkov 2'; Mirčevski (yellow card) 75' (goal) 80'; Stojić (yellow card) 85'; Antonić (yellow card) 87'	Report	Natkho 42' (yellow card) 79'; Pantić (yellow card) 44'; Saničanin 70'; Urošević (yellow card) 79' (goal) 85'	Stadium: TSC Arena; Referee: (Serbia) Aleksandar Živković

13 November 2022 19	Partizan	1–0	Novi Pazar	Belgrade
15:30	Baždar (yellow card) 52'; Jović 72'; Vujačić (yellow card) 83'; Urošević (yellow card) 87'	Report	Rubežić (yellow card) 80'	Stadium: Partizan Stadium; Attendance: 1,500; Referee: (Serbia) Dejan Trifković

5 February 2023 20	Napredak Kruševac	0–1	Partizan	Kruševac
14:30	Stanković (yellow card) 67'	Report	Andrade (yellow card) 35'; Diabaté 61'; Vujačić (yellow card) 90'; Natkho (yellow card) 90+3'	Stadium: Mladost Stadium; Referee: (Serbia) Milan Mitić

11 February 2023 21	Partizan	0–4	Mladost Novi Sad	Belgrade
18:30	Živković (yellow card) 22'; Fejsa (yellow card) 53'; Saničanin (yellow card) 89'	Report	Gall 4'; Cristian 11' (yellow card) 36'; Maksimović 54' (pen.); Milić 58'; Milojević (yellow card) 71'; Mituljikić (yellow card) 77'	Stadium: Partizan Stadium; Referee: (Serbia) Stanko Ostraćanin

19 February 2023 22	Spartak Subotica	1–2	Partizan	Subotica
17:00	Shimura (yellow card) 44'; Stanić 54'; Marinković (yellow card) 56'	Report	Filipović (yellow card) 33'; Gomes 41', 67'; Belić (yellow card) 45'; Urošević (yellow card) 78'	Stadium: Subotica City Stadium; Referee: (Serbia) Aleksandar Živković

27 February 2023 23	Partizan	1–1	Radnički 1923	Belgrade
14:00	Menig 12'; Živković (yellow card) 24'; Ilić (yellow card) 26'	Report	Čolović (yellow card) 3'; Vidosavljević 80' (yellow card) 90+5'	Stadium: Partizan Stadium; Referee: (Serbia) Pavle Tomić

3 March 2023 24	Red Star Belgrade	1–0	Partizan	Belgrade
19:00	Vigo 12'; Rodić (yellow card) 20'; Pešić (yellow card) 73'; Eraković (yellow card) 90'; Mijailović (yellow card) 90+10'	Report	Belić (yellow card) 59'; Urošević (yellow card) 67'; Marković (yellow card) 67'; Baždar (yellow card) 90'; Gomes (red card) 90'	Stadium: Rajko Mitić Stadium; Referee: (Serbia) Aleksandar Živković

8 March 2023 25	Partizan	1–1	Kolubara	Belgrade
18:30	Natkho 7' (pen.); Colorado (yellow card) 79'	Report	Simović (yellow card) 65'; Mrkić 71'	Stadium: Partizan Stadium; Referee: (Serbia) Marko Srećković

12 March 2023 26	Mladost Lučani	0–3	Partizan	Lučani
18:15		Report	Marković 52'; Menig 78'; Belić (yellow card) 89'; Natkho 90'	Stadium: Mladost Stadium; Attendance: 700; Referee: (Serbia) Srđan Jovanović

17 March 2023 27	Partizan	1–2	Radnik Surdulica	Belgrade
16:00	Belić (yellow card) 31'; Baždar (yellow card) 49'; Filipović (yellow card) 59'; Gomes 82'; Pavlović (yellow card) 89'	Report	Radulović 13'; Jokić 45' (yellow card) 45+5'; Nedeljković (yellow card) 71'	Stadium: Partizan Stadium; Referee: (Serbia) Momčilo Marković

1 April 2023 28	Vojvodina	2–1	Partizan	Novi Sad
20:05	Malbašić 54'; Nikolić 84'	Report	Pantić 90'	Stadium: Karađorđe Stadium; Referee: (Serbia) Srđan Jovanović

5 April 2023 29	Partizan	1–0	Voždovac	Belgrade
16:30	Gomes 5'; Jović (yellow card) 81'	Report	Damjanović (yellow card) 59'; Mijailović (yellow card) 59'	Stadium: Partizan Stadium; Referee: (Serbia) Pavle Tomić

20 April 2023* 30	Čukarički	1–0	Partizan	Belgrade
17:15	Ivanović 46'; Popović (yellow card) 61'	Report	Pantić (yellow card) 54'	Stadium: Čukarički Stadium; Attendance: 0 Referee: (Serbia) Milan Mitić
Note: The match was postponed to 12 April because of the disorder in the stands. The match will resume from the 22nd minute. The match is rescheduled for 20 April.

==== Championship round ====
Pos	Team	Pld	W	D	L	GF	GA	GD	Pts	Qualification	RSB	TSC	CUK	PAR	VOJ	NPZ	VOZ	RDK
2	TSC	37	22	9	6	66	32	+34	75	Qualification for the Champions League third qualifying round (Note: Due to Russian suspension, TSC were promoted from the second qualifying round to the third qualifying round.)			1–0	1–3	1–1		2–0	
3	Čukarički	37	23	6	8	65	38	+27	75	Qualification for the Europa League play-off round (Note: Awarded to third place finisher since winner of the 2022–23 Serbian Cup, Red Star Belgrade, has already qualified for 2023-24 UEFA Champions League)				1–0	1–0	4–0		2–1
4	Partizan	37	21	8	8	68	34	+34	71	Qualification for the Europa Conference League third qualifying round	0–0					2–0	2–1	2–1
5	Vojvodina	37	16	15	6	59	35	+24	63	Qualification for the Europa Conference League second qualifying round				2–2		4–0	2–0	
6	Novi Pazar	37	15	6	16	40	49	−9	51			1–4					0–1	0–1

Source: SuperLiga (in Serbian)
Rules for classification: 1) Points; 2) Points in regular season; 3) Head-to-head points in regular season; 4) Head-to-head goal difference in regular season; 5) Head-to-head goals scored in regular season; 6) Head-to-head away goals scored in regular season (if two teams tied); 7) Goal difference; 8) Goals scored; 9) Fair play ranking; 10) Drawing of lots.

===== Results by matchday =====
Round	1	2	3	4	5	6	7
Ground	A	H	A	H	H	A	H
Result	L	D	W	W	W	D	W
Position	4	4	4	3	4	4	4

Updated to match(es) played on 27 May 2023. Source: Partizan
A = Away; H = Home; W = Win; D = Draw; L = Loss

===== Results =====
23 April 2023 31	Čukarički	1–0	Partizan	Belgrade
18:30	Docić (yellow card) 39' (goal) 42'; Tomović (yellow card) 58'; Adžić (yellow card) 83'; Badamosi (yellow card) 88'	Report	Vujačić (yellow card) 56'; Belić (yellow card) 65'	Stadium: Čukarički Stadium; Attendance: 0 Referee: (Serbia) Stanko Ostraćanin

26 April 2023 32	Partizan	0–0	Red Star Belgrade	Belgrade
18:30	Marković (yellow card) 32'; Urošević (yellow card) 65'; Jović (yellow card) 72'; Popović (yellow card) 89'; Vujačić (yellow card) 90'	Report	Dragović (yellow card) 85'; Katai (yellow card) 87'	Stadium: Partizan Stadium; Attendance: 0 Referee: (Serbia) Dejan Trifković

1 May 2023 33	TSC	1–3	Partizan	Bačka Topola
19:00	Jovanović 20'; Đakovac (yellow card) 56'; Stanojev (yellow card) 66'; Ilić (yellow card) 83'	Report	Gomes 12'; Saničanin (yellow card) 18'; Jović (yellow card) 23' (goal) 48'; Belić (yellow card) 61'; Urošević (yellow card) 66'; Filipović 70'; Colorado (yellow card) 90+5'	Stadium: TSC Arena; Referee: (Serbia) Srđan Jovanović

8 May 2023 34	Partizan	2–0	Novi Pazar	Belgrade
20:00	Šehović 2'; Belić (yellow card) 55'; Pantić (yellow card) 75'; Gomes 82'	Report	Joksimović (yellow card) 11'; Bogdanovski (yellow card) 78'; Gavrić (yellow card) 75'	Stadium: Partizan Stadium; Attendance: 0 Referee: (Serbia) Nikola Radaković

14 May 2023 35	Partizan	2–1	Radnički 1923	Belgrade
19:30	Filipović (yellow card) 36'; Menig 41'; Gomes 56'	Report	Srnić (yellow card) 35'; Milunović 44'; Krajišnik (yellow card) 56'	Stadium: Partizan Stadium; Referee: (Serbia) Pavle Tomić

21 May 2023 36	Vojvodina	2–2	Partizan	Novi Sad
19:00	Milošević 21', 46'; Busnić (yellow card) 27'	Report	Belić (yellow card) 13'; Gomes 17' (yellow card) 87'; Colorado 50'	Stadium: Karađorđe Stadium; Referee: (Serbia) Milan Mitić

27 May 2023 37	Partizan	2–1	Voždovac	Belgrade
19:00	Diabaté 25'; Menig 35'; Saničanin (yellow card) 82'	Report	Damjanović (yellow card) 64'; Teodorović 79'	Stadium: Partizan Stadium; Referee: (Serbia) Marko Delibašić

=== Serbian Cup ===
28 September 2022 First round	Radnički Sremska M.	1–1 (2–0 p)	Partizan	Sremska Mitrovica
15:00	Protić (yellow card) 21'; Grbović (yellow card) 39'; Gajić (yellow card) 84'; Marinković 90+2'	Report	Andrade 18'; Traoré (yellow card) 68'; Belić (yellow card) 71'	Stadium: Radnički Stadium; Attendance: 1,500; Referee: (Serbia) Pavle Ilić
	Penalties
	Spasojević (penalty scored); Petrović (penalty scored); Kovačević (penalty missed); Ristović (penalty missed)		Gomes (penalty missed); Živković (penalty missed); Urošević (penalty missed); Andrade (penalty missed)

=== UEFA Europa League ===
==== Third qualifying round ====
4 August 2022 Third qualifying round	AEK Larnaca (Cyprus)	2–1	(Serbia) Partizan	Larnaca, Cyprus
18:00	García 34'; Sanjurjo (yellow card) 59'; Tomović (yellow card) 68'; Miličević 70'	Report	Menig 18'; Vujačić (yellow card) 59'; Urošević (yellow card) 59'; Fejsa (yellow card) 83'; Belić (yellow card) 90+3'	Stadium: AEK Arena; Attendance: 4,250; Referee: (Latvia) Andris Treimanis

11 August 2022 Third qualifying round	Partizan (Serbia)	2–2 (3–4 agg.)	(Cyprus) AEK Larnaca	Belgrade, Serbia
21:00	Gomes 24', 54'; Natkho (yellow card) 52'; Lukač (yellow card) 52'; Marković (yellow card) 60'; Urošević (yellow card) 62'	Report	Gyurcsó 51'; Faraj 57'; Casas (yellow card) 81'; Mamas (yellow card) 90+1'; Pirić (yellow card) 90+2'	Stadium: Partizan Stadium; Attendance: 10,802; Referee: (Spain) José María Sánchez Martínez

=== UEFA Europa Conference League ===
==== Play-off round ====
18 August 2022 Play-off round	Partizan (Serbia)	4–1	(Malta) Ħamrun Spartans	Belgrade, Serbia
21:00	Gomes 15'; Urošević 25'; Diabaté 33'; Živković (yellow card) 56'; Belić (yellow card) 60'; Andrade 77'	Report	Guillaumier 52'; Borg (yellow card) 66'	Stadium: Partizan Stadium; Attendance: 5,502; Referee: (Slovakia) Filip Glova

25 August 2022 Play-off round	Ħamrun Spartans (Malta)	3–3 (7–4 agg.)	(Serbia) Partizan	Ta' Qali, Malta
20:00	Prša 27'; Sowe (yellow card) 30'; Nedeljković (yellow card) 75'; Callegari (yellow card) 77'; Freitas 82' (pen.); Fedele 90+1' (pen.)	Report	Gomes 34', 78'; Živković (yellow card) 36'; Urošević 72'; Belić (yellow card) 81'; Natcho (yellow card) 90'	Stadium: Centenary Stadium; Attendance: 3,269; Referee: (Denmark) Jakob Kehlet

==== Group stage ====
Pos	Team	Pld	W	D	L	GF	GA	GD	Pts	Qualification
1	(France) Nice	6	2	3	1	8	7	+1	9 (Note: Head-to-head points: Nice 4, Partizan 1.)	Advance to round of 16
2	(Serbia) Partizan	6	2	3	1	9	7	+2	9	Advance to knockout round play-offs
3	(Germany) 1. FC Köln	6	2	2	2	8	8	0	8	
4	(Czech Republic) Slovácko	6	1	2	3	8	11	−3	5	

Source: UEFA
Rules for classification: Group stage tiebreakers

==== Results ====
8 September 2022 1	1. FC Slovácko (Czech Republic)	3–3	(Serbia) Partizan	Uherské Hradiště, Czech Republic
18:45	Kalabiška 5', 19'; Kozák 83' (yellow card) 64'; Hofmann (yellow card) 67'; Doski (yellow card) 90'	Report	Belić (red card) 22'; Natcho (yellow card) 45+3'; Diabaté 47', 53'; Gomes 62'; Saničanin (yellow card) 71'; Urošević (yellow card) 77'	Stadium: Městský fotbalový stadion Miroslava Valenty; Attendance: 7,032; Referee: (Republic of Ireland) Rob Harvey

15 September 2022 2	Partizan (Serbia)	1–1	(France) Nice	Belgrade, Serbia
21:00	Traoré (yellow card) 52'; Diabaté 60'	Report	Bryan 2'; Boudaoui (yellow card) 79'	Stadium: Partizan Stadium; Attendance: 9,126; Referee: (England) Andrew Madley

6 October 2022 3	1. FC Köln (Germany)	0–1	(Serbia) Partizan	Cologne, Germany
21:00		Report	Marković 9'; Natcho (yellow card) 90'	Stadium: RheinEnergieStadion; Attendance: 47,000; Referee: (Spain) Ricardo de Burgos Bengoetxea

13 October 2022 4	Partizan (Serbia)	2–0	(Germany) 1. FC Köln	Belgrade, Serbia
18:45	Diabaté 15' (yellow card) 45+3'; Gomes 52'; Belić (yellow card) 58'; Marković (yellow card) 69'; Fejsa (yellow card) 74'; Urošević (yellow card) 90+4'	Report	Hübers (yellow card) 48'; Hector (yellow card) 55'; Skhiri (yellow card) 90+4'	Stadium: Partizan Stadium; Attendance: 15,467; Referee: (Israel) Roi Reinshreiber

27 October 2022 5	Nice (France)	2–1	(Serbia) Partizan	Nice, France
18:45	Pépé 29'; Lemina 77' (yellow card) 90+2'	Report	Gomes 74'	Stadium: Allianz Riviera; Attendance: 11,324; Referee: (Hungary) István Vad

3 November 2022 6	Partizan (Serbia)	1–1	(Czech Republic) 1. FC Slovácko	Belgrade, Serbia
21:00	Natcho 41' (pen.); Filipović (yellow card) 44'; Traoré (yellow card) 88'; Vujačić (yellow card) 90+2'; Urošević (yellow card) 90+3'; Marković (yellow card) 90+4'	Report	Šimko (yellow card) 16'; Kalabiška (yellow card) 40'; Mihálik 73'	Stadium: Partizan Stadium; Attendance: 17,256; Referee: (Poland) Paweł Raczkowski

==== Knockout Phase ====
===== Knockout round play-offs =====
15 February 2023 Knockout round play-off	Sheriff Tiraspol (Moldova)	0–1	(Serbia) Partizan	Chișinău, Moldova (Note: Sheriff Tiraspol will play their home match at Zimbru Stadium, Chișinău, instead of their regular stadium, Sheriff Stadium, Tiraspol, due to Transnistria's involvement in the Russian invasion of Ukraine.)
21:00	Tapsoba (yellow card) 45+2'; Moumouni (yellow card) 90+7'	Report	Belić (yellow card) 36'; Gomes 45'; Vujačić (red card) 50'; Popović (yellow card) 72'	Stadium: Zimbru Stadium; Attendance: 0 (Note: The match was played behind closed doors due to the possibility of Russia attempting a coup plot in Moldova.); Referee: (Germany) Harm Osmers

23 February 2023 Knockout round play-off	Partizan (Serbia)	1–3 (2–3 agg.)	(Moldova) Sheriff Tiraspol	Belgrade, Serbia
18:45	Menig 13'; Baždar (yellow card) 88'	Report	Badolo 22' (pen.); Radeljić (yellow card) 28'; Diop 45+1', 47'; Kyabou (yellow card) 68'	Stadium: Partizan Stadium; Attendance: 8,575; Referee: (Sweden) Andreas Ekberg

== Statistics ==
=== Squad statistics ===
No.	Pos	Nat	Player	Total		SuperLiga		Cup		Europe	
No.	Pos	Nat	Player	Apps	Goals	Apps	Goals	Apps	Goals	Apps	Goals
Goalkeepers
25	GK	(Serbia) SRB	Milan Lukač	1	0	0	0	1	0	0	0
41	GK	(Serbia) SRB	Aleksandar Popović	39	0	28	0	0	0	11	0
85	GK	(Serbia) SRB	Nemanja Stevanović	10	0	9	0	0	0	1	0
Defenders
3	DF	(Serbia) SRB	Mihajlo Ilić	9	0	8	0	0	0	1	0
4	DF	(Bosnia and Herzegovina) BIH	Siniša Saničanin	23	1	17	1	0	0	6	0
5	DF	(Montenegro) MNE	Igor Vujačić	44	2	33	2	0	0	11	0
6	DF	(Serbia) SRB	Svetozar Marković	34	3	22	2	1	0	11	1
12	DF	(Serbia) SRB	Zlatan Šehović	13	1	9	1	1	0	3	0
17	DF	(Serbia) SRB	Marko Živković	26	1	19	1	1	0	6	0
26	DF	(Serbia) SRB	Aleksandar Filipović	29	2	20	2	1	0	8	0
72	DF	(Serbia) SRB	Slobodan Urošević	47	6	35	4	1	0	11	2
Midfielders
7	MF	(Cape Verde) CPV	Patrick Andrade	26	2	16	0	1	1	9	1
8	MF	(Mali) MLI	Hamidou Traoré	22	0	14	0	1	0	7	0
10	MF	(Israel) ISR	Bibras Natkho	46	13	36	12	0	0	10	1
13	MF	(Colombia) COL	Andrés Colorado	14	1	14	1	0	0	0	0
15	MF	(Serbia) SRB	Ljubomir Fejsa	32	0	23	0	0	0	9	0
40	MF	(Serbia) SRB	Kristijan Belić	32	1	22	1	1	0	9	0
45	MF	(Serbia) SRB	Mateja Stjepanović	1	0	1	0	0	0	0	0
55	MF	(Serbia) SRB	Danilo Pantić	19	1	18	1	0	0	1	0
Forwards
9	FW	(Netherlands) NED	Queensy Menig	43	9	33	7	0	0	10	2
11	FW	(Cape Verde) CPV	Ricardo Gomes	48	28	35	19	1	0	12	9
14	FW	(Serbia) SRB	Samed Baždar	34	4	27	4	0	0	7	0
18	FW	(Mali) MLI	Fousseni Diabaté	45	7	32	2	1	0	12	5
20	FW	(Serbia) SRB	Andrija Pavlović	24	2	18	2	0	0	6	0
29	FW	(Serbia) SRB	Nemanja Ilić	0	0	0	0	0	0	0	0
38	FW	(Serbia) SRB	Janko Jevremović	8	0	8	0	0	0	0	0
43	FW	(Serbia) SRB	Nemanja Trifunović	0	0	0	0	0	0	0	0
44	FW	(Serbia) SRB	Bogdan Mirčetić	0	0	0	0	0	0	0	0
77	FW	(Serbia) SRB	Nemanja Jović	25	2	22	2	0	0	3	0
90	FW	(Serbia) SRB	Mihajlo Petković	7	1	7	1	0	0	0	0
Players transferred out during the season
8	FW	(Hungary) HUN	Filip Holender	1	0	1	0	0	0	0	0
16	MF	(Serbia) SRB	Saša Zdjelar	3	0	3	0	0	0	0	0
36	FW	(Serbia) SRB	Nikola Terzić	12	1	8	1	1	0	3	0
48	DF	(Serbia) SRB	Mateja Stašević	0	0	0	0	0	0	0	0
50	FW	(Montenegro) MNE	Marko Brnović	0	0	0	0	0	0	0	0
51	FW	(Serbia) SRB	Vanja Vlahović	0	0	0	0	0	0	0	0
87	FW	(Serbia) SRB	Nikola Lakčević	0	0	0	0	0	0	0	0
97	MF	(Serbia) SRB	Aleksandar Lutovac	17	1	10	1	1	0	6	0

Last updated: 27 May 2023
Source: Competitions

=== Goal scorers ===
Rank	No.	Pos	Nat	Name	SuperLiga	Serbian Cup	Europe	Total
1	11	FW	(Cape Verde)	Ricardo Gomes	19	0	9	28
2	10	MF	(Israel)	Bibras Natkho	12	0	1	13
3	9	FW	(Netherlands)	Queensy Menig	7	0	2	9
4	18	FW	(Mali)	Fousseni Diabaté	2	0	5	7
5	72	DF	(Serbia)	Slobodan Urošević	4	0	2	6
6	14	FW	(Serbia)	Samed Baždar	4	0	0	4
7	6	DF	(Serbia)	Svetozar Marković	2	0	1	3
8	7	MF	(Cape Verde)	Patrick Andrade	0	1	1	2
8	5	DF	(Montenegro)	Igor Vujačić	2	0	0	2
8	20	FW	(Serbia)	Andrija Pavlović	2	0	0	2
8	5	DF	(Serbia)	Aleksandar Filipović	2	0	0	2
8	77	FW	(Serbia)	Nemanja Jović	2	0	0	2
9	90	FW	(Serbia)	Mihajlo Petković	1	0	0	1
9	97	MF	(Serbia)	Aleksandar Lutovac	1	0	0	1
9	36	FW	(Serbia)	Nikola Terzić	1	0	0	1
9	40	MF	(Serbia)	Kristijan Belić	1	0	0	1
9	17	DF	(Serbia)	Marko Živković	1	0	0	1
9	4	DF	(Bosnia and Herzegovina)	Siniša Saničanin	1	0	0	1
9	55	MF	(Serbia)	Danilo Pantić	1	0	0	1
9	12	DF	(Serbia)	Zlatan Šehović	1	0	0	1
9	13	MF	(Colombia)	Andrés Colorado	1	0	0	1
9				Own goal	1	0	0	1
Totals					68	1	21	90

Last updated: 27 May 2023

=== Clean sheets ===
Rank	No.	Pos	Nat	Name	SuperLiga	Serbian Cup	Europe	Total
1	41	GK	(Serbia)	Aleksandar Popović	11	0	3	14
2	85	GK	(Serbia)	Nemanja Stevanović	4	0	0	4
Totals					15	0	3	18

Last updated: 27 May 2023

=== Disciplinary record ===
Number	Nation	Position	Name	SuperLiga		Serbian Cup		Europe		Total	
Number	Nation	Position	Name	Booked	Sent off (straight red)	Booked	Sent off (straight red)	Booked	Sent off (straight red)	Booked	Sent off (straight red)
2	(Serbia)	DF	Mihajlo Ilić	2	0	0	0	0	0	2	0
4	(Bosnia and Herzegovina)	DF	Siniša Saničanin	7	1	0	0	1	0	8	1
5	(Montenegro)	DF	Igor Vujačić	6	0	0	0	2	1	8	1
6	(Serbia)	DF	Svetozar Marković	5	0	0	0	3	0	8	0
7	(Cape Verde)	MF	Patrick Andrade	3	0	0	0	0	0	3	0
8	(Mali)	MF	Hamidou Traoré	2	0	1	0	2	0	5	0
10	(Israel)	MF	Bibras Natkho	3	0	0	0	4	0	7	0
11	(Cape Verde)	FW	Ricardo Gomes	3	1	0	0	0	0	3	1
13	(Colombia)	MF	Andrés Colorado	2	0	0	0	0	0	2	0
14	(Serbia)	FW	Samed Baždar	5	0	0	0	1	0	6	0
15	(Serbia)	MF	Ljubomir Fejsa	1	0	0	0	2	0	3	0
16	(Serbia)	MF	Saša Zdjelar	1	0	0	0	0	0	1	0
17	(Serbia)	DF	Marko Živković	3	0	0	0	2	0	7	0
18	(Mali)	FW	Fousseni Diabaté	0	0	0	0	1	0	1	0
20	(Serbia)	FW	Andrija Pavlović	1	0	0	0	0	0	1	0
25	(Serbia)	GK	Milan Lukač	0	0	0	0	1	0	1	0
26	(Serbia)	DF	Aleksandar Filipović	5	0	0	0	2	0	7	0
36	(Serbia)	FW	Nikola Terzić	1	0	0	0	1	0	2	0
40	(Serbia)	MF	Kristijan Belić	11	0	1	0	5	1	17	1
41	(Serbia)	GK	Aleksandar Popović	1	0	0	0	0	0	1	0
50	(Serbia)	MF	Danilo Pantić	3	0	0	0	0	0	3	0
72	(Serbia)	DF	Slobodan Urošević	8	0	0	0	5	0	13	0
77	(Serbia)	FW	Nemanja Jović	4	0	0	0	0	0	4	0
97	(Serbia)	MF	Aleksandar Lutovac	1	0	0	0	0	0	1	0
			TOTALS	78	2	2	0	31	2	111	4

Last updated: 27 May 2023

=== Game as captain ===
Rank	No.	Pos	Nat	Name	SuperLiga	Serbian Cup	Europe	Total
1	72	DF	(Serbia)	Slobodan Urošević	32	1	11	44
2	16	MF	(Serbia)	Saša Zdjelar	3	0	0	3
2	10	MF	(Israel)	Bibras Natkho	2	0	1	3
Totals					37	1	12	50

Last updated: 27 May 2023
