= 2022–23 in Serbian football =

Football in Serbia
- Season: 2022–23

The 2022–23 Serbian football will be the 17th season of the Serbian football since its establishment in 2006.

== National teams ==
=== Group B4 ===
Pos	Team	Pld	W	D	L	GF	GA	GD	Pts	Promotion or relegation	(Serbia)	(Norway)	(Slovenia)	(Sweden)
1	Serbia (P)	6	4	1	1	13	5	+8	13	Promotion to League A	—	0–1	4–1	4–1
2	Norway	6	3	1	2	7	7	0	10		0–2	—	0–0	3–2
3	Slovenia	6	1	3	2	6	10	−4	6		2–2	2–1	—	0–2
4	Sweden (R)	6	1	1	4	7	11	−4	4	Relegation to League C	0–1	1–2	1–1	—

Source: UEFA
(P) Promoted; (R) Relegated

=== Group G ===
Pos	Team	Pld	W	D	L	GF	GA	GD	Pts	Qualification
1	Brazil	3	2	0	1	3	1	+2	6	Advanced to knockout stage
2	Switzerland	3	2	0	1	4	3	+1	6	Advanced to knockout stage
3	Cameroon	3	1	1	1	4	4	0	4	
4	Serbia	3	0	1	2	5	8	−3	1	

Source: FIFA
24 November 2022
22:00

Brazil	2–0	Serbia
Richarlison 62', 73'

Lusail Stadium, Lusail
Attendance: 88,103
Referee: Alireza Faghani (Iran)

28 November 2022
13:00

Cameroon	3–3	Serbia
Castelletto 29'; Aboubakar 63'; Choupo-Moting 66'		Pavlović 45+1'; S. Milinković-Savić 45+3'; A. Mitrović 53'

Al Janoub Stadium, Al Wakrah
Attendance: 39,789
Referee: Mohammed Abdulla Hassan Mohamed (United Arab Emirates)

2 December 2022
22:00

Serbia	2–3	Switzerland
A. Mitrović 26'; Vlahović 35'		Shaqiri 20'; Embolo 44'; Freuler 48'

Stadium 974, Doha
Attendance: 41,378
Referee: Fernando Rapallini (Argentina)

==== Group H ====
Pos	Team	Pld	W	D	L	GF	GA	GD	Pts	Qualification	(Germany)	(Portugal)	(Serbia)	(Turkey)	(Israel)	(Bulgaria)
1	Germany	10	9	0	1	47	5	+42	27	2023 FIFA Women's World Cup	—	3–0	5–1	8–0	7–0	7–0
2	Portugal	10	7	1	2	26	9	+17	22	Play-offs	1–3	—	2–1	4–0	4–0	3–0
3	Serbia	10	7	0	3	26	14	+12	21		3–2	1–2	—	2–0	4–0	3–0
4	Turkey	10	3	1	6	9	26	−17	10		0–3	1–1	2–5	—	3–2	1–0
5	Israel	10	3	0	7	7	25	−18	9		0–1	0–4	0–2	1–0	—	2–0
6	Bulgaria	10	0	0	10	1	37	−36	0		0–8	0–5	1–4	0–2	0–2	—

Source: UEFA

== Men's football ==
Pos	Team	Pld	W	D	L	GF	GA	GD	Pts	Qualification (Note: Teams will be split into two groups (Final A and Final B) after each have played 30 matches.)
1	Red Star Belgrade	30	26	4	0	81	14	+67	82	Qualification for the Championship round
2	TSC	30	18	8	4	52	22	+30	62	Qualification for the Championship round
3	Čukarički	30	19	5	6	56	31	+25	62	Qualification for the Championship round
4	Partizan	30	17	6	7	57	28	+29	57	Qualification for the Championship round
5	Vojvodina	30	14	12	4	47	27	+20	54	Qualification for the Championship round
6	Novi Pazar	30	15	5	10	37	31	+6	50	Qualification for the Championship round
7	Voždovac	30	11	6	13	24	42	−18	39	Qualification for the Championship round
8	Radnički 1923	30	10	7	13	29	30	−1	37	Qualification for the Championship round
9	Kolubara	30	10	7	13	23	45	−22	37	Qualification for the Relegation round
10	Napredak Kruševac	30	8	7	15	22	31	−9	31	Qualification for the Relegation round
11	Radnički Niš	30	7	8	15	30	51	−21	29	Qualification for the Relegation round
12	Javor-Matis	30	7	8	15	28	49	−21	29	Qualification for the Relegation round
13	Spartak Subotica	30	5	10	15	26	43	−17	25	Qualification for the Relegation round
14	Mladost Lučani	30	4	11	15	32	52	−20	23	Qualification for the Relegation round
15	Radnik Surdulica	30	5	8	17	21	44	−23	23	Qualification for the Relegation round
16	Mladost GAT	30	4	8	18	20	45	−25	20	Qualification for the Relegation round

Source: SuperLiga (in Serbian)
Rules for classification: 1) Points; 2) Head-to-head points; 3) Head-to-head goal difference; 4) Head-to-head goals scored; 5) Head-to-head away goals scored (if two teams tied); 6) Goal difference; 7) Goals scored; 8) Fair play ranking; 9) Draw.
Notes:

Pos	Team	Pld	W	D	L	GF	GA	GD	Pts	Qualification	RSB	TSC	CUK	PAR	VOJ	NPZ	VOZ	RDK
1	Red Star Belgrade (C)	37	30	7	0	96	19	+77	97	Qualification for the Champions League group stage		4–1	4–0		2–1	2–2		
2	TSC	37	22	9	6	66	32	+34	75	Qualification for the Champions League third qualifying round (Note: Due to Russian suspension, TSC were promoted from the second qualifying round to the third qualifying round.)			1–0	1–3	1–1		2–0	
3	Čukarički	37	23	6	8	65	38	+27	75	Qualification for the Europa League play-off round (Note: Awarded to third place finisher since winner of the 2022–23 Serbian Cup, Red Star Belgrade, has already qualified for 2023-24 UEFA Champions League)				1–0	1–0	4–0		2–1
4	Partizan	37	21	8	8	68	34	+34	71	Qualification for the Europa Conference League third qualifying round	0–0					2–0	2–1	2–1
5	Vojvodina	37	16	15	6	59	35	+24	63	Qualification for the Europa Conference League second qualifying round				2–2		4–0	2–0	
6	Novi Pazar	37	15	6	16	40	49	−9	51			1–4					0–1	0–1
7	Voždovac	37	13	7	17	29	52	−23	46		0–2		1–1					2–1
8	Radnički 1923	37	11	9	17	37	43	−6	42		1–1	1–4			2–2			

Source: SuperLiga (in Serbian)
Rules for classification: 1) Points; 2) Points in regular season; 3) Head-to-head points in regular season; 4) Head-to-head goal difference in regular season; 5) Head-to-head goals scored in regular season; 6) Head-to-head away goals scored in regular season (if two teams tied); 7) Goal difference; 8) Goals scored; 9) Fair play ranking; 10) Drawing of lots.
(C) Champions
Notes:

Pos	Team	Pld	W	D	L	GF	GA	GD	Pts	Qualification or relegation	NAP	SPA	MLA	JAV	KOL	RNI	RSU	MNS
9	Napredak Kruševac	37	10	9	18	27	37	−10	39			1–0		0–1		1–2	0–1	
10	Spartak Subotica	37	9	12	16	38	49	−11	39				2–0	3–2			2–2	
11	Mladost Lučani	37	9	11	17	40	57	−17	38		0–1						2–0	2–1
12	Javor-Matis	37	9	10	18	35	56	−21	37				0–1		2–0		0–0	0–0
13	Kolubara (Note: Kolubara got 6 points deducted due to match fixing, and was later relegated to the second tier due to multiple irregularities.) (R)	37	11	8	18	28	57	−29	35	Relegation to Serbian First League	2–2	0–3	0–1			2–1		
14	Radnički Niš (O)	37	9	8	20	37	61	−24	35	Qualification for the play-off		0–1	1–2	3–2				0–1
15	Radnik Surdulica (O)	37	8	11	18	28	50	−22	35	Qualification for the play-off					2–1	1–0		1–1
16	Mladost GAT (R)	37	6	12	19	25	49	−24	30	Relegation to Serbian First League	0–0	1–1			1–0			

Source: SuperLiga (in Serbian)
Rules for classification: 1) Points; 2) Points in regular season; 3) Head-to-head points in regular season; 4) Head-to-head goal difference in regular season; 5) Head-to-head goals scored in regular season; 6) Head-to-head away goals scored in regular season (if two teams tied); 7) Goal difference; 8) Goals scored; 9) Fair play ranking; 10) Drawing of lots.
(O) Play-Off Winner; (R) Relegated
Notes:

Pos	Team	Pld	W	D	L	GF	GA	GD	Pts	Qualification (Note: Teams will be split into two groups (Final A and Final B) after each have played 30 matches.)
1	IMT	30	18	7	5	45	27	+18	61	Promotion to the Serbian SuperLiga
2	Železničar	30	17	6	7	47	25	+22	57	Promotion to the Serbian SuperLiga
3	Grafičar	30	15	5	10	57	38	+19	50	Qualification for play-off
4	Radnički SM	30	11	12	7	30	26	+4	45	Qualification for play-off
5	Jedinstvo	30	12	8	10	32	26	+6	44	
6	Novi Sad	30	12	7	11	34	31	+3	43	
7	Inđija	30	10	13	7	38	30	+8	43	
8	Radnički NB	30	12	4	14	27	35	−8	40	
9	Sloboda	30	7	16	7	33	34	−1	37	
10	OFK Vršac	30	10	7	13	28	33	−5	37	
11	Mačva	30	8	13	9	28	31	−3	37	
12	Metalac	30	9	8	13	29	36	−7	35	
13	Trayal	30	9	8	13	29	37	−8	35	Relegation to Serbian League
14	Loznica	30	7	10	13	28	45	−17	31	Relegation to Serbian League
15	Rad	30	5	13	12	32	46	−14	28	Relegation to Serbian League
16	Zlatibor	30	4	11	15	26	43	−17	23	Relegation to Serbian League

Updated to match(es) played on completed. Source: First league (in Serbian)
Rules for classification: 1) Points; 2) Head-to-head points; 3) Head-to-head goal difference; 4) Head-to-head goals scored; 5) Head-to-head away goals scored (if two teams tied); 6) Goal difference; 7) Goals scored; 8) Fair play ranking; 9) Draw.
Notes:

Pos	Team	Pld	W	D	L	GF	GA	GD	Pts	Qualification	IMT	ŽEL	GRA	INĐ	RSM	JED	NVS	RBG
1	IMT (C, P)	37	22	9	6	63	36	+27	75	Promotion to the Serbian SuperLiga		1–1	0–0			4–3	7–1	
2	Železničar (P)	37	20	8	9	63	35	+28	68	Promotion to the Serbian SuperLiga			2–2	0–1	3–0	5–3		
3	Grafičar	37	17	9	11	65	46	+19	60	Qualification for play-off					2–2	1–1	2–0	1–0
4	Inđija	37	13	15	9	46	35	+11	54	Qualification for play-off	2–0		3–0					0–1
5	Radnički SM	37	13	14	10	43	38	+5	53		1–3			1–1			4–2	5–0
6	Jedinstvo	37	14	11	12	45	38	+7	53					1–1	1–0		3–0	
7	Novi Sad	37	14	8	15	44	51	−7	50			3–2		2–0				2–2
8	Radnički NB	37	13	6	18	32	50	−18	45		1–3	0–3				1–1		

Source: First League (in Serbian)
Rules for classification: 1) Points; 2) Points in regular season; 3) Head-to-head points in regular season; 4) Head-to-head goal difference in regular season; 5) Head-to-head goals scored in regular season; 6) Head-to-head away goals scored in regular season (if two teams tied); 7) Goal difference; 8) Goals scored; 9) Fair play ranking; 10) Drawing of lots.
(C) Champions; (P) Promoted

Pos	Team	Pld	W	D	L	GF	GA	GD	Pts	Qualification	SLO	VRŠ	MAČ	MET	LOZ	TRA	ZLA	RAD
9	Sloboda	37	11	18	8	42	41	+1	51			0–4	1–0		3–0	1–0		
10	OFK Vršac	37	13	9	15	39	42	−3	48				2–2	1–4		2–1		0–0
11	Mačva	37	11	15	11	37	40	−3	48					1–1	2–1	2–1	0–2	
12	Metalac	37	12	12	13	42	42	0	48		1–1				1–0		1–1	4–1
13	Loznica (R)	37	10	11	16	40	54	−14	41	Relegation to Serbian League		2–1					5–1	3–0
14	Trayal (R)	37	10	10	17	37	46	−9	40	Relegation to Serbian League				1–1	1–1			4–0
15	Zlatibor (R)	37	7	12	18	36	54	−18	33	Relegation to Serbian League	1–2	0–1				2–0		
16	Rad (R)	37	5	15	17	37	63	−26	30	Relegation to Serbian League	1–1		1–2				2–3	

Source: First League (in Serbian)
Rules for classification: 1) Points; 2) Points in regular season; 3) Head-to-head points in regular season; 4) Head-to-head goal difference in regular season; 5) Head-to-head goals scored in regular season; 6) Head-to-head away goals scored in regular season (if two teams tied); 7) Goal difference; 8) Goals scored; 9) Fair play ranking; 10) Drawing of lots.
(R) Relegated

== UEFA competitions ==
=== Group H ===
Pos	Team	Pld	W	D	L	GF	GA	GD	Pts	Qualification	FER	MON	TRA	ZVE
1	(Hungary) Ferencváros	6	3	1	2	8	9	−1	10 (Note: Head to head points: Ferencváros 4, Monaco 1.)	Advance to round of 16	—	1–1	3–2	2–1
2	(France) Monaco	6	3	1	2	9	8	+1	10	Advance to knockout round play-offs	0–1	—	3–1	4–1
3	(Turkey) Trabzonspor	6	3	0	3	11	9	+2	9	Transfer to Europa Conference League	1–0	4–0	—	2–1
4	(Serbia) Red Star Belgrade	6	2	0	4	9	11	−2	6		4–1	0–1	2–1	—

Source: UEFA

=== Group D ===
Pos	Team	Pld	W	D	L	GF	GA	GD	Pts	Qualification	NCE	PRT	KLN	SVK
1	(France) Nice	6	2	3	1	8	7	+1	9 (Note: Head-to-head points: Nice 4, Partizan 1.)	Advance to round of 16	—	2–1	1–1	1–2
2	(Serbia) Partizan	6	2	3	1	9	7	+2	9	Advance to knockout round play-offs	1–1	—	2–0	1–1
3	(Germany) 1. FC Köln	6	2	2	2	8	8	0	8		2–2	0–1	—	4–2
4	(Czech Republic) Slovácko	6	1	2	3	8	11	−3	5		0–1	3–3	0–1	—

Source: UEFA
