= Miloš Milojević (footballer) =

Serbian football coach

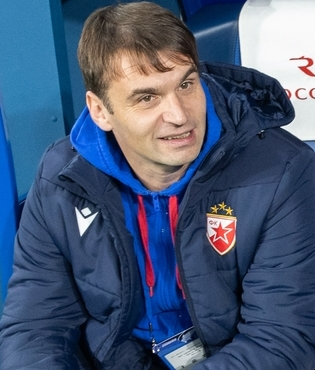
- Milojević with Red Star Belgrade in 2022

Personal information
- Full name: Miloš Milojević
- Date of birth: 29 September 1982 (age 44)
- Place of birth: Knjaževac, SR Serbia, Yugoslavia
- Height: 1.82 m (6 ft 0 in)
- Position: Defender

Team information
- Current team: Al-Nasr (head coach)

Youth career
- –1995: Radnički Niš
- 1995–1998: Red Star Belgrade

Senior career*
Years	Team	Apps	(Gls)
2000–2005	Timok		
2006	Hamar	13	(2)
2007–2008	Ægir	19	(7)
2009	Hamar	13	(1)
2010–2011	Víkingur	25	(0)

Managerial career
- 2008–2015: Víkingur (youth)
- 2013–2015: Víkingur (assistant)
- 2015–2017: Víkingur
- 2017: Breidablik
- 2018: Mjällby (assistant)
- 2018–2019: Mjällby
- 2019–2021: Red Star Belgrade (assistant)
- 2021: Hammarby IF
- 2022: Malmö FF
- 2022–2023: Red Star Belgrade
- 2023–2025: Al Wasl
- 2025: Sharjah
- 2026–: Al-Nasr
- * Club domestic league appearances and goals

Miloš Milojević (Serbian Cyrillic: Милош Милојевић; born 29 September 1982) is a Serbian football coach and former player, who is the head coach UAE Pro League club Al-Nasr.

== Playing career ==
As a youngster, Milojević was part of the academies of Radnički Niš and Red Star Belgrade. From his senior debut in 2000, he played in the Serbian First League and Serbian League, the domestic second and third tiers, mainly for FK Timok. He also played for Timok in the 2005–06 Serbia and Montenegro Cup, eliminating Partizan in the first round.

In 2006, he moved abroad for the first time in his career, signing with Icelandic club Hamar. He went on to represent Ægir and Víkingur, playing in the top tier Úrvalsdeild with the latter club, before retiring due to injuries in 2011.

== Coaching career ==
=== Víkingur and Breiðablik ===
After retiring as a player, Milojević started to work as a youth coach in Iceland. In the summer of 2013, he became the assistant coach of his former club Víkingur. Together with manager Ólafur Þórðarson, he led the team to a 4th place in the 2014 Úrvalsdeild table, their best result since winning the championship in 1991. The club was knocked out in the first qualifying round of the 2015–16 Europa League through a 2–3 defeat on aggregate against Slovenian team FC Koper. On 15 July 2015, Milojevic was promoted to head coach of Víkingur, and led the club to a 9th place in the 2015 season. In 2016, Víkingur finished 7th in the table. He resigned on 19 May 2017, due to disagreements with the board, as the club was placed 10th in the table.

On 22 May 2017, just days after his departure from Víkingur, Milojević was appointed head coach of fellow Úrvalsdeild club Breiðablik, replacing Arnar Grétarsson that had been sacked by the club. He led the side to 6th place in the table, but left at the end of the year.

=== Mjällby AIF ===
On 17 November 2017, it was announced that Milojević would join Swedish club Mjällby AIF ahead of the 2018 season, as an assistant coach and head of youth development. Competing in Ettan Södra, Sweden's third tier, he took over as head coach on 18 June when Jonas Andersson stepped down for personal reasons. The club went on to win the league through 21 wins in 30 games, twelve points clear of second placed Oskarshamns AIK in the table. On 22 November 2018, Milojevic signed a new two-year contract with the club.

In 2019, Mjällby won Superettan, Sweden's second tier, as newcomers, through 17 wins in 30 games, two points clear of Varbergs BoIS. Despite winning two promotions in just two seasons in charge of Mjällby, Milojevic left the club on 1 December 2019, after not being able to agree on new terms with their board.

=== Red Star Belgrade ===
On 19 December 2019, Milojević joined Red Star Belgrade as a first-team coach and assistant to manager Dejan Stanković. The club won the 2019–20 Serbian SuperLiga, 15 points clear of city rivals Partizan.

In 2020–21, Red Star Belgrade went unbeaten through the whole league season, winning 35 of 38 fixtures, while scoring a record-breaking 114 goals. On 25 May, the club also won the Serbian Cup through a 4–3 win on penalties (0–0 after full time) against Partizan in the final. Together with Hoffenheim, they advanced through the group stage of the 2020–21 Europa League, eliminating Slovan Liberec and Gent in the process. The club was knocked out in the round of 32 by Italian club Milan on away goals after the tie ended 3–3 on aggregate.

=== Hammarby IF ===
On 13 June 2021, Milojević was appointed new head coach of Hammarby IF in Allsvenskan, following the sacking of Stefan Billborn. He signed a contract until the end of 2024.

He led the side to the play-off round of the 2021–22 UEFA Europa Conference League, after eliminating Maribor (4–1 on aggregate) and FK Čukarički (6–4 on aggregate), where the club was knocked out by Basel on penalties (4–4 on aggregate).

On 13 December 2021, Milojević was sacked by Hammarby IF, after he had sought a move to Norwegian side Rosenborg BK and visited Trondheim without Hammarby's permission, in a deal that ultimately fell through. The club's board called his behavior "unacceptable" and stated that they had "lost all their trust" in Milojević.

=== Malmö FF ===
On 7 January 2022, Milojević was appointed new head coach of the reigning Allsvenskan champions Malmö FF, following the departure of Jon Dahl Tomasson. Milojević was relieved of his duties on 29 July 2022, the day after Malmö FF lost in the qualifying round of the 2022–23 UEFA Champions League to Lithuanian side FK Žalgiris by an aggregate score of 3–0.

=== Return to Red Star Belgrade ===
Milojević became the head coach of Red Star Belgrade for the 2022–23 season, where he managed to secure the domestic double, Serbian SuperLiga and Serbian Cup.

=== Al Wasl ===
Milojević managed to achieve the domestic double with Emirati club Al Wasl in the 2023–24 season, securing both the UAE Pro League and UAE President's Cup.

=== Sharjah ===
In June 2025, Milojević signed a two-year contract with fellow Emirati club Sharjah.

== Managerial statistics ==
As of match played 13 November 2025

Managerial record by team and tenure
Team	Nat	From	To	Record							
Team	Nat	From	To	G	W	D	L	GF	GA	GD	Win %
Víkingur Reykjavík	(Iceland)	15 July 2015	19 May 2017	52	21	13	18	81	77	+4	40.38
Breiðablik	(Iceland)	22 May 2017	3 October 2017	18	8	3	7	29	26	+3	44.44
Mjällby	(Sweden)	19 June 2018	1 December 2019	49	32	9	8	92	46	+46	65.31
Hammarby	(Sweden)	14 June 2021	13 December 2021	28	15	6	7	54	40	+14	53.57
Malmö FF	(Sweden)	7 January 2022	29 July 2022	26	15	5	6	45	24	+21	57.69
Red Star Belgrade	(Serbia)	26 August 2022	30 June 2023	43	32	7	4	98	33	+65	74.42
Al Wasl	(United Arab Emirates)	1 July 2023	26 May 2025	80	49	17	14	179	98	+81	61.25
Sharjah	(United Arab Emirates)	10 June 2025	16 November 2025	14	5	3	6	14	22	−8	35.71
Total				312	179	63	70	592	365	+227	57.37

== Honours ==
=== Manager ===
Mjällby AIF

- Superettan: 2019
- Ettan: 2018

Malmö FF

- Svenska Cupen: 2021–22

Red Star Belgrade

- Serbian SuperLiga: 2022–23
- Serbian Cup: 2022–23

Al Wasl F.C.

- UAE Pro League: 2023–24
- UAE President's Cup: 2023–24

Individual

- Serbian SuperLiga Manager of the Month: October 2022, April 2023
- Serbian SuperLiga Manager of the Season: 2022–23
- UAE Pro League Best Coach of the Season: 2023–24
