= 2022–23 Serbian Cup =

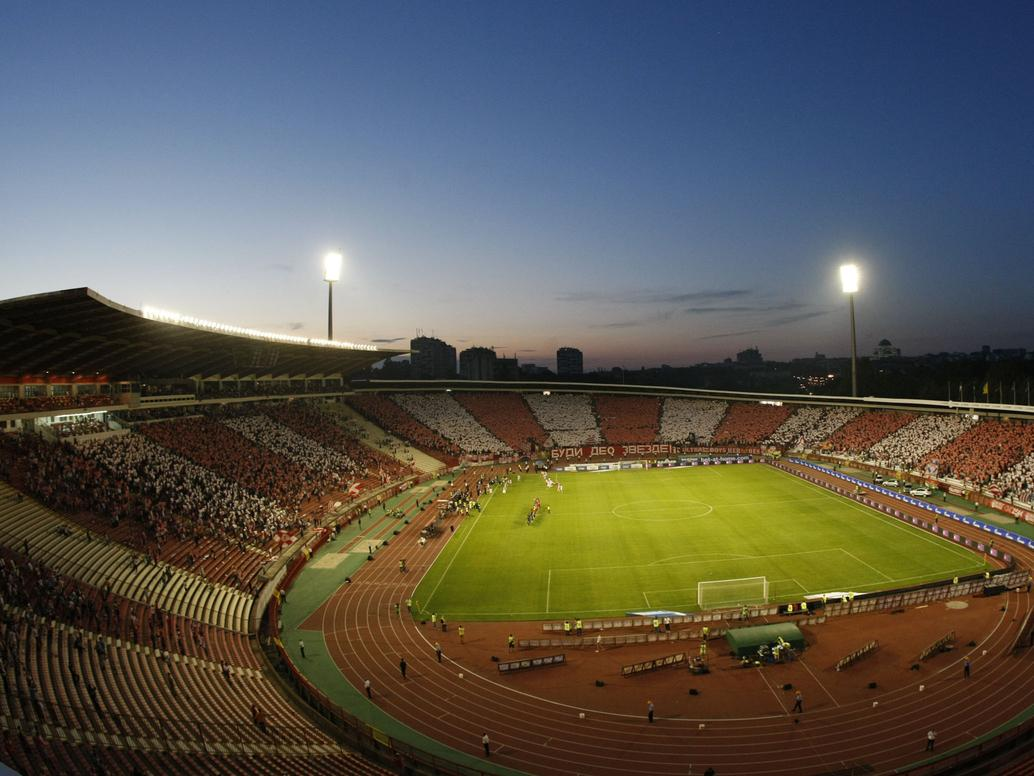
- Stadium Rajko Mitić hosted the final

Tournament details
- Country: Serbia
- Teams: 36

Final positions
- Champions: Red Star Belgrade
- Runners-up: Čukarički
- Semifinalists: Vojvodina; TSC

Tournament statistics
- Matches played: 35
- Goals scored: 79 (2.26 per match)
- Top goal scorer: Kings Kangwa (3 goals)

The 2022–23 Serbian Cup season was the seventeenth season of the Serbian national football cup competition. It started on 14 September 2022, and ended on 25 May 2023.

Match times up to 30 October 2022 and from 26 March 2023 were CEST (UTC+2). Times on interim ("winter") days were CET (UTC+1).

== Calendar ==
Round	Date(s)	Number of fixtures	Clubs	New entries this round
Preliminary round	14 September 2022	4	36 → 32	8
Round of 32	19 October 2022	16	32 → 16	28
Round of 16	9 November 2022	8	16 → 8	none
Quarter-finals	3 May 2023	4	8 → 4	none
Semi-finals	17 May 2023	2	4 → 2	none
Final	25 May 2023	1	2 → 1	none

== Preliminary round ==
A preliminary round was held in order to reduce the number of teams competing in the first round to 32. It consisted of 4 single-legged ties, with a penalty shoot-out as the decider if the score was tied after 90 minutes. 8 clubs are participating in the preliminary round - four winners of the cups of territorial associations and teams that were from 13th to 16th place in the previous season of the Serbian First League.

14 September 2022	OFK Bačka (III)	2–2 (5–7 p)	Kabel (III)	Bačka Palanka, Serbia
16:00				Stadium: Slavko Maletin Vava Stadium

14 September 2022	Mokra Gora (IV)	1–6	Zlatibor (II)	Zubin Potok, Kosovo, Serbia
16:00				Stadium: Stadion Mala Marakana

14 September 2022	Jagodina (III)	1–0	Timok (III)	Jagodina, Serbia
16:00				Stadium: Jagodina City Stadium

14 September 2022	Radnički Beograd (II)	1–0	Budućnost Dobanovci (III)	New Belgrade, Serbia
				Stadium: Stadion kraj Studenjaka

== Round of 32 ==
Draw for the first round took place on 19 September 2022. Matches were played on 19 October 2022. It consisted of 16 single-legged ties, with a penalty shoot-out as the decider if the score was tied after 90 minutes.

28 September 2022	Radnički Sremska Mitrovica (II)	1–1 (2–0 p)	Partizan	Sremska Mitrovica, Serbia
15:00	Marinković 90+2'	Report	Andrade 18'	Stadium: Stadium FK Radnički; Attendance: 1,500; Referee: Pavle Ilić

29 September 2022	Mačva (II)	0–2	Red Star	Šabac, Serbia
16:00		Report	Milunović 48'; Kangwa 90+2'	Stadium: Šabac City Stadium; Attendance: 4,900; Referee: Milan Ilić

12 October 2022	Inđija (II)	0–2	Napredak	Inđija, Serbia
15:00		Report	Mićin 41'; Matić 76'	Stadium: Toyo Tires Arena; Attendance: 500; Referee: Marko Srećković

19 October 2022	Železničar Pančevo (II)	3–0	RFK Novi Sad (II)	Pančevo, Serbia
14:30	Grgić 17'; Zuvić 61'; Đorđević 63'	Report		Stadium: SC Mladost; Attendance: 500; Referee: Ljubiša Borisavljević

19 October 2022	IMT (II)	2–1	Radnički 1923	New Belgrade, Serbia
14:30	Radočaj 70'; Luković 72'	Report	Evandro 81'	Stadium: Bežanija Stadium; Attendance: 600; Referee: Mladen Jakovljević

19 October 2022	OFK Žarkovo (IV)	1–1 (4–5 p)	Kolubara	Belgrade. Serbia
14:30	Novitović 68'	Report	Ilić 68'	Stadium: Stadium OFK Žarkovo; Attendance: 500; Referee: Stefan Filipović

19 October 2022	Mladost GAT	2–0	Voždovac	Novi Sad, Serbia
15:30	Dimitrov 7'; Arsić 84'	Report		Stadium: Karađorđe Stadium; Attendance: 300; Referee: Marko Mihailović

19 October 2022	Radnički Beograd (II)	2–1	Mladost Lučani	New Belgrade, Serbia
14:30	Đorđević 51'; Stanimirović 72'	Report	Jojić 28' (pen.)	Stadium: Stadion kraj Studenjaka; Attendance: 450; Referee: Saša Ranisavić

19 October 2022	Javor	0–0 (5–6 p)	Radnički Niš	Ivanjica, Serbia
13:00		Report		Stadium: Javor Stadium; Attendance: 400; Referee: Ivan Stamenković

19 October 2022	Jagodina (III)	1–2	Novi Pazar	Jagodina, Serbia
14:30	Stanisavljević 1'	Report	Stanojlović 32'; Nikčević 68' (pen.)	Stadium: Jagodina City Stadium; Attendance: 500; Referee: Miroslav Milenković

19 October 2022	Loznica (II)	1–2	TSC	Loznica, Serbia
14:30	Matić 69'	Report	Ristić 67' (o.g.); Ratkov 72'	Stadium: Lagator Stadium; Attendance: 200; Referee: Predrag Janjuš

19 October 2022	Polet (III)	0–1	Radnik	Ljubić, Serbia
14:30		Report	Bogdanović 21'	Stadium: Polet Stadium; Attendance: 500; Referee: Stefan Jenkić

19 October 2022	Rad (II)	0–2	Spartak	Belgrade, Serbia
18:00		Report	Srećković 71' (pen.); Hrstić 75'	Stadium: King Peter I Stadium; Attendance: 300; Referee: Nenad Đorđević

19 October 2022	Zlatibor (II)	0–2	Čukarički	Zlatibor, Serbia
14:30		Report	Vujadinović 44'; Docić 65' (pen.)	Stadium: Stadion Švajcarija; Attendance: 200; Referee: Nikola Petrović

19 October 2022	Kabel (III)	0–0 (4–5 p)	Metalac (II)	Novi Sad, Serbia
14:30		Report		Stadium: Kabel Stadium; Attendance: 200; Referee: Aleksandar Vukadinović

1 November 2022	RFK Grafičar (II)	1–1 (0–3 p)	Vojvodina	Belgrade, Serbia
16:00	Mituljikić 48'	Report	Čumić 86'	Stadium: Rajko Mitić Stadium; Attendance: 300; Referee: Marko Delibašić

== Round of 16 ==
Draw for the second round took place on 3 November 2022. Matches were played on 9 November 2022. It consisted of 8 single-legged ties, with a penalty shoot-out as the decider if the score was tied after 90 minutes.

15 March 2023	Radnički Sremska Mitrovica (II)	1–3	Red Star Belgrade	Sremska Mitrovica, Serbia
15:00	Đorđević 38' (pen.)		Ivanić 43'; Rakonjac 56'; Kangwa 65'	Stadium: Stadium FK Radnički; Attendance: 1,000; Referee: Pavle Ilić

9 November 2022	TSC	2–0	Železničar Pančevo (II)	Bačka Topola, Serbia
16:30	Mirčevski 3' (pen.), 32'	Report		Stadium: TSC Arena; Attendance: 400; Referee: Miloš Milanović

15 March 2023	Metalac (II)	0–2	Čukarički	Gornji Milanovac, Serbia
17:00		Report	Spasojević 21'; Adžić 62' (pen.)	Stadium: Stadion Metalac; Attendance: 500; Referee: Milan Ilić

9 November 2022	Radnički Beograd (II)	1–2	Radnik	New Belgrade, Serbia
13:00	Kojić 84'	Report	Danoski 15', 85'	Stadium: Stadion kraj Studenjaka; Attendance: 300; Referee: Ivan Stamenković

9 November 2022	Radnički Niš	3–0	IMT (II)	Niš, Serbia
16:30	Štulić 26'; Petrov 65'; Pejović 83'	Report		Stadium: Čair Stadium; Attendance: 350; Referee: Lazar Lukić

9 November 2022	Novi Pazar	2–1	Kolubara	Novi Pazar. Serbia
16:30	Gavrić 31', 44'	Report	Ilić 43'	Stadium: Novi Pazar City Stadium; Attendance: 4,000; Referee: Pavle Ilić

15 March 2023	Spartak	0–1	Napredak	Subotica, Serbia
19:00		Report	Šarić 38'	Stadium: Subotica City Stadium; Attendance: 500; Referee: Milan Ilić

9 November 2022	Vojvodina	2–1	Mladost GAT	Novi Sad, Serbia
18:30	Simić 86'; N.Nikolić 90'	Report	Arsić 15' (pen.)	Stadium: Karađorđe Stadium; Attendance: 1,200; Referee: Danilo Nikolić

== Quarter-finals ==
Draw for the quarter-finals took place on 30 March 2023. Matches will be played on 3 and 4 May 2023. It consisted of 4 single-legged ties, with a penalty shoot-out as the decider if the score was tied after 90 minutes.

3 May 2023	Napredak	0–0 (2–4 p)	Red Star Belgrade	Kruševac
18:30		Report		Stadium: Mladost Stadium; Attendance: 4,700; Referee: Milan Mitić
	Penalties
	Šarić (penalty scored); Kerkez (penalty missed); Đeković (penalty missed); Putinčanin (penalty scored)		Rakonjac (penalty scored); Azarovi (penalty scored); Ivanić (penalty missed); Mijatović (penalty scored); Bukari (penalty scored)

4 May 2023	Radnik	0–1	Čukarički	Surdulica
16:00		Report	Ivanović 14'	Stadium: Surdulica City Stadium; Attendance: 500; Referee: Momčilo Marković

4 May 2023	TSC	4–0	Novi Pazar	Bačka Topola
16:00	Vukić 17', 63'; Ilić 34', 74'	Report		Stadium: TSC Arena; Attendance: 800; Referee: Srđan Jovanović

4 May 2023	Radnički Niš	0–1	Vojvodina	Niš
18:30		Report	Nikolić 43'	Stadium: Čair Stadium; Attendance: 1,100; Referee: Miloš Milanović

== Semi-finals ==
Draw for the semi-finals took place on 9 May 2023. Matches were played on 17 and 18 May 2023. It will consist of 2 single-legged ties, with a penalty shoot-out as the decider if the score was tied after 90 minutes.

18 May 2023	Vojvodina	0–1	Čukarički	Novi Sad
15:00		Report	Adžić 71'	Stadium: Karađorđe Stadium

17 May 2023	TSC	0–3	Red Star Belgrade	Bačka Topola
18:30		Report	Kanga 36' (pen.); Ivanić 56'; Kangwa 70' (pen.)	Stadium: TSC Arena

== Final ==
25 May 2023	Čukarički	1–2	Red Star Belgrade	Belgrade
21:00	Docić 21'		Pešić 61', 76'	Stadium: Rajko Mitić Stadium

== Top scorers ==
As of matches played on 25 May 2023.

Rank	Player	Club	Goals
1	(Zambia) Kings Kangwa	Red Star Belgrade	3
2	(Serbia) Nikola Dišić	Zlatibor	2
2	(Serbia) Stefan Stanisavljević	Jagodina	2
2	(Serbia) Vanja Ilić	Kolubara	2
2	(North Macedonia) Martin Mirčevski	TSC	2
2	(North Macedonia) Zoran Danoski	Radnik	2
2	(Serbia) Nenad Gavrić	Novi Pazar	2
2	(Serbia) Lazar Arsić	Mladost GAT	2
2	(Montenegro) Mirko Ivanić	Red Star Belgrade	2
2	(Serbia) Nemanja Nikolić	Vojvodina	2
2	(Serbia) Stefan Vukić	TSC	2
2	(Serbia) Luka Ilić	TSC	2
2	(Serbia) Luka Adžić	Čukarički	2
2	(Serbia) Marko Docić	Čukarički	2
2	(Serbia) Aleksandar Pešić	Red Star Belgrade	2
16	47 players		1
