= Andrés Colorado =

Colombian footballer (born 1998)

Personal information
- Full name: Andrés Felipe Colorado Sánchez
- Date of birth: 1 December 1998 (age 27)
- Place of birth: El Cerrito, Colombia
- Height: 1.93 m (6 ft 4 in)
- Position: Defensive midfielder

Team information
- Current team: Deportivo Cali (on loan from Necaxa)
- Number: 25

Youth career
- Cortuluá

Senior career*
Years	Team	Apps	(Gls)
2017–2023	Cortuluá	22	(2)
2019–2021	→ Deportivo Cali (loan)	89	(6)
2022	→ São Paulo (loan)	12	(0)
2023	→ Partizan (loan)	14	(1)
2023–	Necaxa	18	(0)
2024–2025	→ Atlético Junior (loan)	14	(0)
2025–	→ Deportivo Cali (loan)	12	(1)

International career
2022–	Colombia	1	(1)
- * Club domestic league appearances and goals as of 12 December 2025

Andrés Felipe Colorado Sánchez (born 1 December 1998) is a Colombian professional footballer who plays as a defensive midfielder for Categoría Primera A club Deportivo Cali, on loan from Necaxa.

== Career statistics ==
=== Club ===
As of match played 5 December 2024

Appearances and goals by club, season and competition
Club	Season	League			State league		National cup (Note: Includes Copa Colombia, Copa do Brasil, Serbian Cup)		Continental		Other		Total	
Club	Season	Division	Apps	Goals	Apps	Goals	Apps	Goals	Apps	Goals	Apps	Goals	Apps	Goals
Cortuluá	2017	Categoría Primera A	0	0	—		0	0	—		—		0	0
Cortuluá	2018	Categoría Primera B	22	2	—		2	0	—		—		24	2
Cortuluá	Total		22	2	—		2	0	0	0	0	0	24	2
Deportivo Cali (loan)	2019	Categoría Primera A	32	1	—		2	0	2 (Note: Appearance(s) in Copa Sudamericana)	0	—		36	1
Deportivo Cali (loan)	2020	Categoría Primera A	19	1	—		0	0	6	1	—		25	1
Deportivo Cali (loan)	2021	Categoría Primera A	38	4	—		6	1	0	0	—		44	5
Deportivo Cali (loan)	Total		89	6	—		8	1	8	1	0	0	105	7
São Paulo (loan)	2022	Série A	8	0	4 (Note: Appearance(s) in Campeonato Paulista)	0	2	0	3	0	—		17	0
Partizan (loan)	2022-23	Serbian SuperLiga	14	1	—		0	0	0	0	—		14	1
Necaxa	2023-24	Liga MX	18	0	—		0	0	2 (Note: Appearance(s) in Leagues Cup)	0	—		20	0
Junior (loan)	2024	Categoría Primera A	11	0	—		1	0	1 (Note: Appearance(s) in Copa Libertadores)	0	0	0	12	0
Career total			162	9	4	0	13	1	14	1	0	0	193	11

=== International ===
As of match played 16 January 2022

Appearances and goals by national team and year
National team	Year	Apps	Goals
Colombia	2022	1	1
Total		1	1

Scores and results list Colombia's goal tally first, score column indicates score after each Colorado goal.

List of international goals scored by Andrés Colorado
No.	Date	Venue	Opponent	Score	Result	Competition	Ref.
1	16 January 2022	DRV PNK Stadium, Fort Lauderdale, United States	Honduras	2–1	2–1	Friendly	
