= Zlatan Šehović =

Serbian association footballer

Zlatan Šehović Златан Шеховић
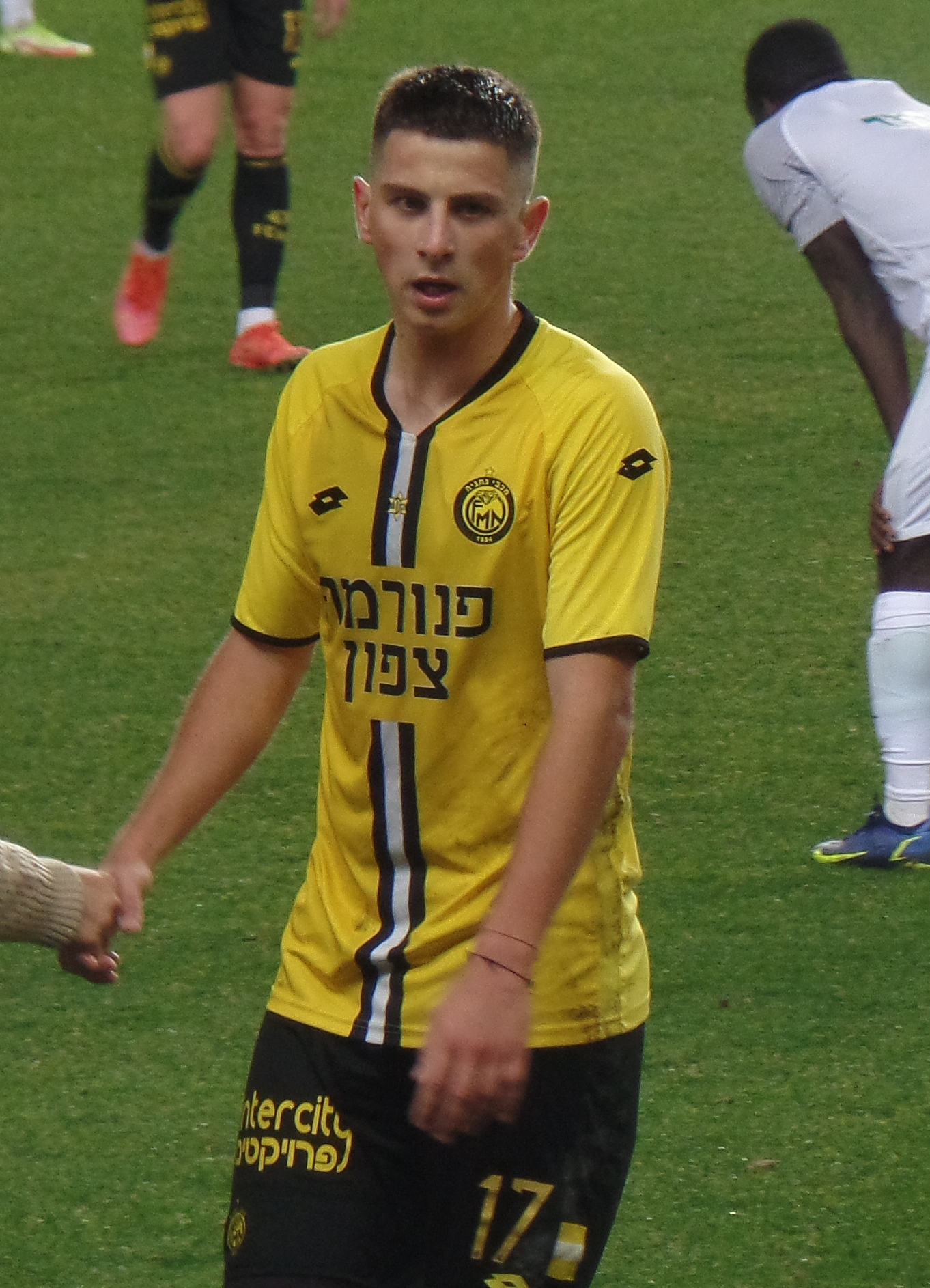
- Šehović in 2022

Personal information
- Date of birth: 8 August 2000 (age 26)
- Place of birth: Belgrade, FR Yugoslavia
- Height: 1.80 m (5 ft 11 in)
- Position: Left-back

Team information
- Current team: Dukla Prague
- Number: 3

Youth career
- Partizan

Senior career*
Years	Team	Apps	(Gls)
2018–2020	Partizan	10	(0)
2018	→ Teleoptik (loan)	11	(2)
2020–2022	Maccabi Netanya	61	(1)
2022–2025	Partizan	13	(1)
2024	→ Ordabasy (loan)	21	(1)
2025–	Dukla Prague	26	(2)
2026–	→ Čukarički (loan)	12	(1)

International career^{‡}
2016–2017	Serbia U17 (Note: Only official UEFA matches included)	4	(0)
2018–2019	Serbia U19	6	(0)
2019–2021	Serbia U21	11	(0)
- * Club domestic league appearances and goals as of 20 October 2026 ‡ National team caps and goals as of 16 November 2021

Zlatan Šehović (Serbian Cyrillic: Златан Шеховић; born 8 August 2000) is a Serbian professional footballer who plays as a defender for Czech First League club Dukla Prague.

== Club career ==
After coming through the youth system of Partizan, Šehović was loaned to affiliated side Teleoptik in early 2018. He was subsequently promoted to the Partizan first team in June. Following his promising displays during preparations for the 2018–19 season, Šehović made his official debut for the club in a UEFA Europa League qualifier against Rudar Pljevlja on 12 July, playing the full 90 minutes. During the 2018–19 season. Šehović made thirteen first-team appearances. In May 2019, he won the first trophy in his senior career, the Serbian Cup. Partizan defeated Red Star (1:0) in the Cup final, and Šehović entered the field in the 80th minute of this game.

On 9 July 2025, Šehović signed a contract with Czech First League club Dukla Prague as a free agent.

== International career ==
Šehović was selected by Perica Ognjenović to represent Serbia at the 2017 UEFA European Under-17 Championship. He was also capped for the under-19 team.

== Statistics ==
As of 20 October 2026

Club	Season	League	League		Cup		League Cup		Continental		Total	
Club	Season	League	Apps	Goals	Apps	Goals	Apps	Goals	Apps	Goals	Apps	Goals
Partizan	2018–19	Serbian SuperLiga	9	0	2	0	0	0	2	0	13	0
Partizan	2019–20	Serbian SuperLiga	1	0	0	0	0	0	0	0	1	0
Partizan	Total		10	0	2	0	0	0	2	0	14	0
Maccabi Netanya	2019–20	Israeli Premier League	10	0	0	0	0	0	0	0	10	0
Maccabi Netanya	2020–21	Israeli Premier League	19	0	4	0	2	0	0	0	25	0
Maccabi Netanya	2021–22	Israeli Premier League	32	1	4	0	1	0	0	0	37	1
Maccabi Netanya	Total		61	1	8	0	3	0	0	0	72	1
Partizan	2022–23	Serbian SuperLiga	9	1	1	0	0	0	3	0	13	1
Partizan	2023–24	Serbian SuperLiga	2	0	2	0	0	0	0	0	4	0
Partizan	2024–25	Serbian SuperLiga	2	0	0	0	0	0	0	0	2	0
Partizan	Total		13	1	3	0	0	0	3	0	19	1
Ordabasy (loan)	2024	Kazakhstan Premier League	21	1	1	0	3	0	5	0	30	1
Dukla Prague	2025–26	Czech First League	26	2	2	0	—		—		28	2
Čukarički (loan)	2026–27	Serbian SuperLiga	12	1	0	0	—		—		12	1
Career total			143	6	16	0	6	0	10	0	170	6

== Honours ==
Partizan

- Serbian Cup: 2018–19
