= Branimir Jočić =

Serbian footballer (born 1994)

Personal information
- Date of birth: 30 November 1994 (age 31)
- Place of birth: Sombor, FR Yugoslavia
- Height: 1.81 m (5 ft 11 in)
- Position: Defensive midfielder

Team information
- Current team: Metallurg Bekabad

Youth career
- Crvenka

Senior career*
Years	Team	Apps	(Gls)
2012–2021	Spartak Subotica	120	(2)
2012–2014	→ Palić (loan)	51	(0)
2014–2015	→ Senta (loan)	13	(1)
2021–2022	Rudar Pljevlja	15	(0)
2022–2023	Mladost GAT	29	(2)
2023	Maziya		
2024	Tekstilac Odžaci	33	(0)
2025	Meizhou Hakka	25	(1)
2026–	Metallurg Bekabad	0	(0)
- * Club domestic league appearances and goals as of 12 March 2026

Branimir Jočić (Serbian Cyrillic: Бранимир Јочић; born 30 November 1994) is a Serbian professional footballer who plays as a defender for Uzbekistan Pro League club Metallurg Bekabad.

== Career statistics ==
As of match played 22 November 2025

Appearances and goals by club, season and competition
Club	Season	League			Cup		Continental		Other		Total	
Club	Season	Division	Apps	Goals	Apps	Goals	Apps	Goals	Apps	Goals	Apps	Goals
Spartak Subotica	2014–15	Serbian SuperLiga	13	0	2	0	—		—		15	0
Spartak Subotica	2015–16	Serbian SuperLiga	31	0	5	0	—		—		36	0
Spartak Subotica	2016–17	Serbian SuperLiga	5	1	0	0	—		—		5	1
Spartak Subotica	2017–18	Serbian SuperLiga	31	0	1	0	—		—		32	0
Spartak Subotica	2018–19	Serbian SuperLiga	8	0	0	0	3	0	—		11	0
Spartak Subotica	2019–20	Serbian SuperLiga	21	1	1	0	—		—		22	1
Spartak Subotica	2020–21	Serbian SuperLiga	11	0	0	0	—		—		11	0
Spartak Subotica	Total		120	2	9	0	3	0	—		132	2
Palić (loan)	2012–13	Serbian League Vojvodina	26	0	—		—		—		26	0
Palić (loan)	2013–14	Serbian League Vojvodina	25	0	—		—		—		25	0
Palić (loan)	Total		51	0	—		—		—		51	0
Senta (loan)	2014–15	Serbian League Vojvodina	13	1	—		—		—		13	1
Rudar Pljevlja	2021–22	Montenegrin First League	15	0	2	0	—		—		17	0
Mladost GAT	2021–22	Serbian First League	15	2	—		—		—		15	2
Mladost GAT	2022–23	Serbian SuperLiga	14	0	2	0	—		—		16	0
Mladost GAT	Total		29	2	2	0	—		—		31	2
Maziya	2023	Dhivehi Premier League					6	1	—		6	1
Tekstilac Odžaci	2023–24	Serbian First League	16	0	—		—		2	0	18	0
Tekstilac Odžaci	2024–25	Serbian SuperLiga	17	0	1	0	—		—		18	0
Tekstilac Odžaci	Total		33	0	1	0	—		2	0	36	0
Meizhou Hakka	2025	Chinese Super League	25	1	0	0	—		—		25	1
Career total			286	6	14	0	9	1	2	0	311	7
