= Vladimir Gaćinović (footballer) =

Serbian football manager (born 1966)

Personal information
- Date of birth: 3 January 1966 (age 60)
- Place of birth: Trebinje, SFR Yugoslavia
- Position: Forward

Senior career*
Years	Team	Apps	(Gls)
1983–1984	Leotar	7	(0)
1988–1990	Leotar	58	(15)
1990	GOŠK-Jug	15	(0)
1991	Leotar	15	(5)
1991–1997	Bečej		

Managerial career
- 2002–2003: Leotar (assistant)
- 2003–2004: Leotar
- 2010–2011: Vojvodina (youth)
- 2012–2013: Leotar
- 2013: Zvijezda Gradačac
- 2013: Igalo
- 2014: Leotar
- 2015–2016: Sūduva (assistant)
- 2016–2017: Vojvodina (assistant)
- 2018: Spartak Subotica (assistant)
- 2018: Spartak Subotica
- 2019–2020: Spartak Subotica
- 2020–2021: Radnički Niš
- 2021–2022: Spartak Subotica
- 2022: Novi Pazar
- 2023: Dečić Tuzi
- 2023: Železničar Pančevo
- 2023–2024: Napredak Kruševac
- 2024–2025: Spartak Subotica
- 2025–2026: Novi Pazar
- * Club domestic league appearances and goals

Vladimir Gaćinović (Serbian Cyrillic: Владимир Гаћиновић, pronounced [ʋlǎdimiːr ɡatɕǐːnoʋitɕ]; born 3 January 1966) is a Serbian football manager and former player.

== Playing career ==
Born in Trebinje, SR Bosnia and Herzegovina, SFR Yugoslavia before the country's break-up, Gaćinović played in the Yugoslav Second League mostly with FK Leotar, but also a half-season with GOŠK-Jug. In summer 1991 he signed with FK Bečej, having made 25 appearances and scored 5 goals. As player he played as forward. He played with Bečej until 1997.

== Coaching career ==
After finishing his playing career, he became a coach. He was the assistant manager of Mile Jovin at Leotar in 2003–04 season, while next season he became the main coach of the team. In season 2010–11 he coached the under-17 side of FK Vojvodina. Between 2012 and 2014 he was back to Bosnia coaching Leotar and NK Zvijezda Gradačac. In between he had a short stint as coach in Montenegro coaching Igalo. In 2015 he accepted a call from major Lithuanian A Lyga side, FK Sūduva, which he coached in seasons 2015 and 2016.

Afterwards, he returned to Serbia and worked as the assistant manager at Serbian SuperLiga clubs Vojvodina and Spartak Subotica. In 2018, he was promoted to head coach of Spartak Subotica. Gaćinović led the team to an historical upset elimination of Sparta Prague in the second qualifying round for the 2018–19 UEFA Europa League. Spartak however went on to be eliminated in the third qualifying round by Brøndby.

On 6 June 2019, it was announced that Gačinović will once again be taking over the Spartak Subotica managerial position.

On 6 October 2021, he was hired as a manager of Spartak Subotica for the third time.

== Personal life ==
His son is Serbian international footballer Mijat Gaćinović.

== Honours ==
Individual

- Serbian SuperLiga Manager of the Month: August 2022
