= Zoran Danoski =

Macedonian footballer

Personal information
- Date of birth: 20 October 1990 (age 36)
- Place of birth: Prilep, SFR Yugoslavia
- Height: 1.70 m (5 ft 7 in)
- Position: Left winger

Team information
- Current team: Bregalnica Štip
- Number: 10

Youth career
- Kožuf

Senior career*
Years	Team	Apps	(Gls)
2009–2012	Baník Most	49	(15)
2012–2015	Příbram	42	(3)
2015	→ Baník Most	7	(1)
2015	Metalurg Skopje	12	(3)
2015–2016	Inter Zaprešić	5	(0)
2017	Příbram	14	(4)
2018	Pobeda	18	(8)
2018–2021	Radnik Surdulica	69	(6)
2021	Proleter Novi Sad	8	(0)
2021–2022	Mladost Lučani	18	(4)
2022	Novi Pazar	7	(2)
2022–2023	Radnik Surdulica	20	(2)
2023	Zvijezda 09	13	(1)
2024	Tikvesh	15	(2)
2024–	Bregalnica Štip	4	(1)
- * Club domestic league appearances and goals as of 14 March 2024

Zoran Danoski (Macedonian: Зоран Даноски; born 20 October 1990) is a Macedonian professional footballer who plays for Bregalnica Štip.

== Club career ==
He started his career in Kožuf. In 2009 he signed for the Czech football club Banik Most, where he spent the next three seasons. After that, he moved to Pribram and conducts the next 3 seasons, from which in the winter of 2015 he will be forwarded to the loan to Banik.

In 2015 he moves to Macedonia and moves to Metalurg from Skopje. On 4 July 2016 he moved to 1.HNL in Inter from Zapresic where he played only five matches. In 2017 he moves again to Pribram, but only after half a season he returns to Macedonia and signs for a club from his hometown Pobeda.

After a half-season in Pobeda, in the summer of 2018, he signed a two-year contract with a Radnik Surdulica. His official debut for Radnik in 12 fixture match of the 2018–19 Serbian SuperLiga season against Napredak, played on 20 October 2018. He was named the best player of the 21 rounds of SuperLiga in the win against OFK Bačka in Surdulica, he scored the goal and assisted 2 times.

On 22 September 2021, he signed with Mladost Lučani.
