= 2022–23 Serbian SuperLiga =

Association football league season

SuperLiga
- Season: 2022–23
- Dates: 8 July 2022 – 28 May 2023
- Champions: Red Star Belgrade; 9th SuperLiga title 34th domestic title
- Relegated: Mladost GAT; Kolubara
- Champions League: Red Star Belgrade; TSC
- Europa League: Čukarički
- Europa Conference League: Partizan; Vojvodina
- Matches: 296
- Goals: 718 (2.43 per match)
- Top goalscorer: Ricardo Gomes (19 goals)
- Biggest home win: Red Star Belgrade 6–0 Radnik; Partizan 6–0 Mladost Lučani
- Biggest away win: Voždovac 0–6 Red Star Belgrade
- Highest scoring: Mladost Lučani 2–5 TSC
- Longest winning run: Red Star Belgrade (11 games)
- Longest unbeaten run: Red Star Belgrade (37 games)
- Longest winless run: Radnik (16 games)
- Longest losing run: Novi Pazar (7 games)
- All statistics correct as of 28 May 2023.

The 2022–23 Serbian SuperLiga (known as the Mozzart Bet SuperLiga for sponsorship reasons) was the 17th season of the Serbian SuperLiga, Serbia's top football league. Red Star were the defending champions, having won their 8th SuperLiga and 33rd domestic title in the previous season.

It began on 8 July 2022. As the 2022 FIFA World Cup started on 21 November, the last round before stoppage was held on 12–13 November. The league resumed games on 3 February 2023.

== Summary ==
Format of the competition remained the same as the last season - each team will play each other twice in round-robin format after which top half will play in Championship round and bottom half in Relegation round Play-offs. Last two teams from Relegation round will be relegated while teams finishing 13th and 14th will play Relegations play-off against teams who finished 3rd and 4th in Serbian First League. Teams can have unlimited number of foreign players with maximum of 4 at the pitch at any time. Similarly at least one player born after 1 January 2001 must be on the pitch at any time.

This season marked the start of a new three-year title sponsorship rights with Mozzart bet betting company.

== Teams ==
Sixteen teams will compete in the league, the top 14 from previous season and two teams promoted from Serbian First League. Promoted teams were Mladost GAT who are promoted to the SuperLiga for the first time in their history and Javor who will return to the top flight after one-year absence. They will replace Proleter and Metalac.

=== Stadium and locations ===
Čukarički	Javor-Matis	Kolubara	Mladost GAT
Čukarički Stadium	Javor Stadium	Kolubara Stadium	Karađorđe Stadium
Capacity: 4,070	Capacity: 3,000	Capacity: 2,500	Capacity: 14,458
Mladost Lučani	Locations of the 2022–23 Serbian SuperLiga teams Locations of the 2022–23 Serbian SuperLiga teams on the territory of Belgrade Locations of the 2022–23 Serbian SuperLiga teams on the territory of Novi Sad		Napredak
Stadion Mladost (Lučani)	Locations of the 2022–23 Serbian SuperLiga teams Locations of the 2022–23 Serbian SuperLiga teams on the territory of Belgrade Locations of the 2022–23 Serbian SuperLiga teams on the territory of Novi Sad		Mladost Stadium
Capacity: 8,000	Locations of the 2022–23 Serbian SuperLiga teams Locations of the 2022–23 Serbian SuperLiga teams on the territory of Belgrade Locations of the 2022–23 Serbian SuperLiga teams on the territory of Novi Sad		Capacity: 10,330
Novi Pazar	Locations of the 2022–23 Serbian SuperLiga teams Locations of the 2022–23 Serbian SuperLiga teams on the territory of Belgrade Locations of the 2022–23 Serbian SuperLiga teams on the territory of Novi Sad		Partizan
Novi Pazar City Stadium	Locations of the 2022–23 Serbian SuperLiga teams Locations of the 2022–23 Serbian SuperLiga teams on the territory of Belgrade Locations of the 2022–23 Serbian SuperLiga teams on the territory of Novi Sad		Partizan Stadium
Capacity: 12,000	Locations of the 2022–23 Serbian SuperLiga teams Locations of the 2022–23 Serbian SuperLiga teams on the territory of Belgrade Locations of the 2022–23 Serbian SuperLiga teams on the territory of Novi Sad		Capacity: 29,775
Radnički 1923	Radnički	Radnik	Red Star
Čika Dača Stadium	Čair Stadium	Surdulica City Stadium	Rajko Mitić Stadium
Capacity: 15,100	Capacity: 18,151	Capacity: 3,312	Capacity: 51,755
Spartak	TSC	Vojvodina	Voždovac
Subotica City Stadium	TSC Arena	Karađorđe Stadium	Shopping Center Stadium
Capacity: 13,000	Capacity: 5,000	Capacity: 14,458	Capacity: 5,175

=== Personnel, Kits and General sponsor ===
Note: Flags indicate national team as has been defined under FIFA eligibility rules. Players and Managers may hold more than one non-FIFA nationality.

Team	Head coach	Captain	Kit manufacturer	General Sponsor
Čukarički	(Bosnia and Herzegovina) Dušan Kerkez	(Serbia) Marko Docić	Adidas	Oliva
Javor-Matis	(Serbia) Milovan Milović	(Serbia) Nemanja Miletić	Miteks	Matis Group
Kolubara	(Serbia) Veroljub Dukanac	(Serbia) Nikola Vasiljević	Seven	Admiralbet
Mladost GAT	(Serbia) Nenad Lalatović	(Serbia) Miloš Milovanović	Joma	GAT doo
Mladost Lučani	(Serbia) Tomislav Sivić	(Serbia) Ivan Milošević	Miteks	Efbet
Napredak	(Serbia) Dragan Perišić	(Serbia) Dejan Kerkez	Givova	mt:s
Novi Pazar	(Serbia) Davor Berber	(Serbia) Filip Kljajić	Nike	Novi Pazar Put
Partizan	(Serbia) Igor Duljaj	(Serbia) Slobodan Urošević	Nike	mt:s
Radnički 1923	(Serbia) Dejan Joksimović	(Serbia) Miloš Vidović	Jako	Mozzart Bet
Radnički Niš	(Serbia) Dragan Šarac	(Serbia) Aleksandar Pejović	Beltona	mt:s
Radnik	(Serbia) Slavoljub Đorđević	(Serbia) Uroš Stojanović	Jako	Efbet
Red Star Belgrade	(Serbia) Miloš Milojević	(Canada) Milan Borjan	Macron	Gazprom
Spartak	(Serbia) Milan Milanović	(Serbia) Nikola Srećković	Legea	Efbet
TSC	(Serbia) Žarko Lazetić	(Serbia) Saša Tomanović	Capelli Sport	SAT-TRAKT
Vojvodina	(Montenegro) Radoslav Batak	(Serbia) Dejan Zukić	Kelme	Srbijagas
Voždovac	(Serbia) Nikola Puača	(Serbia) Stefan Hajdin	Joma	Stadion SC, Efbet

Notes

- Nike is the official ball supplier for Serbian SuperLiga.
- Kelme is the official sponsor of the Referee's Committee of the Football Association of Serbia.

=== Managerial changes ===
Team	Outgoing manager	Manner of departure	Date of vacancy	Position in the table	Incoming manager	Date of appointment
Čukarički	(Serbia) Milan Lešnjak	Contract expired	19 May 2022	Pre-season	(Bosnia and Herzegovina) Dušan Kerkez	31 May 2022
Vojvodina	(Montenegro) Dragan Radojičić	Contract expired	19 May 2022	Pre-season	(Serbia) Milan Rastavac	1 June 2022
Napredak	(Serbia) Zoran Milinković	Contract expired	19 May 2022	Pre-season	(Serbia) Dušan Đorđević	1 June 2022
Radnički Niš	(Montenegro) Radoslav Batak	Contract expired	19 May 2022	Pre-season	(Serbia) Tomislav Sivić	3 June 2022
Novi Pazar	(Serbia) Tomislav Sivić	Contract expired	19 May 2022	Pre-season	(Serbia) Vladimir Gaćinović	4 June 2022
Kolubara	(Serbia) Veroljub Dukanac	Contract expired	19 May 2022	Pre-season	(Serbia) Dejan Đurđević	7 June 2022
Radnički 1923	(Serbia) Nenad Lalatović	Contract expired	19 May 2022	Pre-season	(Serbia) Dejan Joksimović	13 June 2022
Partizan	(Serbia) Aleksandar Stanojević	Resigned	26 May 2022	Pre-season	(Serbia) Ilija Stolica	9 June 2022
Radnik	(Serbia) Dušan Đorđević	Signed with Napredak	1 June 2022	Pre-season	(Serbia) Aleksandar Linta	6 June 2022
Voždovac	(Serbia) Aleksandar Linta	Signed with Radnik	6 June 2022	Pre-season	(Serbia) Nebojša Jandrić	8 June 2022
Mladost GAT	(Serbia) Ljubomir Ristovski	Mutual termination	6 June 2022	Pre-season	(Serbia) Branko Žigić	10 June 2022
Radnik	(Serbia) Aleksandar Linta	Sacked	19 July 2022	16th	(Montenegro) Dragan Radojičić	2 August 2022
Mladost GAT	(Serbia) Branko Žigić	Sacked	1 August 2022	11th	(Serbia) Aleksandar Linta	2 August 2022
Voždovac	(Serbia) Nebojša Jandrić	Mutual termination	8 August 2022	6th	(Serbia) Nikola Puača	14 August 2022
Partizan	(Serbia) Ilija Stolica	Sacked	11 August 2022	9th	(Serbia) Gordan Petrić	13 August 2022
Radnički Niš	(Serbia) Tomislav Sivić	Sacked	12 August 2022	15th	(Serbia) Saša Mrkić	13 August 2022
Red Star Belgrade	(Serbia) Dejan Stanković	Resigned	26 August 2022	1st	(Serbia) Miloš Milojević	27 August 2022
Radnik	(Montenegro) Dragan Radojičić	Sacked	4 September 2022	16th	(Serbia) Dragan Perišić	9 September 2022
Radnički Niš	(Serbia) Saša Mrkić	Sacked	5 September 2022	13th	(Serbia) Nenad Lalatović	5 September 2022
Mladost GAT	(Serbia) Aleksandar Linta	Sacked	19 September 2022	15th	(Serbia) Ljubomir Ristovski	20 September 2022
Spartak Subotica	(Serbia) Slavko Petrović	Sacked	20 September 2022	13th	(Serbia) Ljubiša Dunđerski	22 September 2022
Javor	(Serbia) Igor Bondžulić	Sacked	3 October 2022	12th	(Serbia) Mladen Dodić	4 October 2022
Novi Pazar	(Serbia) Vladimir Gaćinović	Mutual termination	15 October 2022	5th	(Montenegro) Damir Čakar	15 October 2022
Kolubara	(Serbia) Dejan Đurđević	Mutual termination	17 October 2022	8th	(Serbia) Veroljub Dukanac	18 October 2022
Radnik	(Serbia) Dragan Perišić	Mutual termination	20 October 2022	16th	(Bosnia and Herzegovina) Simo Krunić	20 October 2022
Novi Pazar	(Montenegro) Damir Čakar	Mutual termination	14 December 2022	7th	(Serbia) Aleksandar Stanković	14 December 2022
Napredak	(Serbia) Dušan Đorđević	Sacked	19 February 2023	12th	(Serbia) Dragan Perišić	22 February 2023
Vojvodina	(Serbia) Milan Rastavac	Sacked	25 February 2023	6th	(Montenegro) Radoslav Batak	25 February 2023
Partizan	(Serbia) Gordan Petrić	Sacked	27 February 2023	2nd	(Serbia) Igor Duljaj	27 February 2023
Radnički Niš	(Serbia) Nenad Lalatović	Sacked	6 March 2023	13th	(Serbia) Dragan Šarac	8 March 2023
Mladost GAT	(Serbia) Ljubomir Ristovski	Sacked	9 March 2023	15th	(Serbia) Nenad Lalatović	9 March 2023
Mladost Lučani	(Serbia) Dragiša Žunić	Sacked	18 March 2023	14th	(Serbia) Milorad Kosanović	19 March 2023
Novi Pazar	(Serbia) Aleksandar Stanković	Sacked	18 March 2023	6th	(Serbia) Davor Berber	24 March 2023
Spartak Subotica	(Serbia) Ljubiša Dunđerski	Sacked	20 March 2023	13th	(Serbia) Milan Milanović	27 March 2023
Mladost Lučani	(Serbia) Milorad Kosanović	Sacked	10 April 2023	14th	(Serbia) Tomislav Sivić	13 April 2023
Javor	(Serbia) Mladen Dodić	Sacked	25 May 2023	13th	(Serbia) Milovan Milović	25 May 2023

== Regular season ==
=== League table ===
Pos	Team	Pld	W	D	L	GF	GA	GD	Pts	Qualification (Note: Teams will be split into two groups (Final A and Final B) after each have played 30 matches.)
1	Red Star Belgrade	30	26	4	0	81	14	+67	82	Qualification for the Championship round
2	TSC	30	18	8	4	52	22	+30	62	Qualification for the Championship round
3	Čukarički	30	19	5	6	56	31	+25	62	Qualification for the Championship round
4	Partizan	30	17	6	7	57	28	+29	57	Qualification for the Championship round
5	Vojvodina	30	14	12	4	47	27	+20	54	Qualification for the Championship round
6	Novi Pazar	30	15	5	10	37	31	+6	50	Qualification for the Championship round
7	Voždovac	30	11	6	13	24	42	−18	39	Qualification for the Championship round
8	Radnički 1923	30	10	7	13	29	30	−1	37	Qualification for the Championship round
9	Kolubara	30	10	7	13	23	45	−22	37	Qualification for the Relegation round
10	Napredak Kruševac	30	8	7	15	22	31	−9	31	Qualification for the Relegation round
11	Radnički Niš	30	7	8	15	30	51	−21	29	Qualification for the Relegation round
12	Javor-Matis	30	7	8	15	28	49	−21	29	Qualification for the Relegation round
13	Spartak Subotica	30	5	10	15	26	43	−17	25	Qualification for the Relegation round
14	Mladost Lučani	30	4	11	15	32	52	−20	23	Qualification for the Relegation round
15	Radnik Surdulica	30	5	8	17	21	44	−23	23	Qualification for the Relegation round
16	Mladost GAT	30	4	8	18	20	45	−25	20	Qualification for the Relegation round

Source: SuperLiga (in Serbian)
Rules for classification: 1) Points; 2) Head-to-head points; 3) Head-to-head goal difference; 4) Head-to-head goals scored; 5) Head-to-head away goals scored (if two teams tied); 6) Goal difference; 7) Goals scored; 8) Fair play ranking; 9) Draw.

=== Results ===
Home \ Away	ČUK	JAV	KOL	MNS	MLA	NAP	NPZ	PAR	RDK	RNI	RSU	RSB	SPA	TSC	VOJ	VOŽ
Čukarički		3–0	3–0	2–0	3–1	1–0	2–2	1–0	3–2	2–2	1–0	0–2	2–0	1–4	2–0	3–1
Javor-Matis	1–2		0–1	2–1	1–1	2–1	2–1	0–4	0–1	0–2	2–2	0–2	1–0	0–1	1–1	0–2
Kolubara	3–2	1–0		0–0	3–2	0–1	1–0	1–5	1–1	1–0	1–0	0–2	2–1	0–1	2–2	1–0
Mladost GAT	0–2	2–3	0–0		1–1	0–1	1–2	0–1	1–2	0–0	2–1	0–4	1–0	1–2	0–4	1–2
Mladost Lučani	0–1	4–1	2–0	0–0		3–1	1–3	0–3	0–0	2–2	3–2	1–2	1–1	2–5	1–1	1–2
Napredak Kruševac	0–0	2–4	4–0	1–0	0–0		0–1	0–1	1–0	2–0	1–0	1–1	1–1	0–0	0–2	0–0
Novi Pazar	1–2	3–1	0–1	1–0	3–1	2–1		1–0	1–0	0–0	1–0	1–2	2–0	2–1	1–1	0–0
Partizan	3–2	3–3	1–1	0–4	6–0	1–0	1–0		1–1	4–0	1–2	1–1	0–1	0–0	4–1	1–0
Radnički 1923	1–1	0–0	3–0	3–0	1–0	3–0	1–3	0–1		1–0	1–0	0–1	2–2	0–2	0–2	0–1
Radnički Niš	0–2	1–0	1–1	1–1	2–1	3–2	1–3	3–3	1–3		0–0	1–2	3–0	0–3	1–4	2–3
Radnik Surdulica	0–4	0–0	0–0	1–2	1–0	1–0	1–1	0–2	0–0	1–3		1–2	2–0	0–1	1–1	2–0
Red Star Belgrade	3–0	4–1	5–0	4–2	2–0	1–0	5–1	1–0	2–0	4–0	6–0		3–0	1–1	1–1	4–0
Spartak Subotica	1–3	2–2	2–1	0–0	1–1	1–2	2–0	1–2	1–2	0–1	2–0	1–4		0–0	1–1	3–0
TSC	1–1	0–0	3–1	3–0	2–1	2–0	0–1	2–3	2–0	2–0	2–1	1–2	2–2		1–1	3–0
Vojvodina	3–2	2–0	3–0	2–0	1–1	1–0	2–0	2–1	2–1	3–0	1–1	0–2	0–0	1–2		2–1
Voždovac	0–3	0–1	1–0	0–0	1–1	0–0	1–0	0–4	1–0	1–0	4–1	0–6	2–0	1–3	0–0	

Source: SuperLiga (in Serbian)
Legend: Blue = home team win; Yellow = draw; Red = away team win.
For upcoming matches, an "a" indicates there is an article about the rivalry between the two participants.

== Play-offs ==
=== Championship round ===
The top eight teams advanced from the regular season. Teams played each other once.

==== League table ====
Pos	Team	Pld	W	D	L	GF	GA	GD	Pts	Qualification	RSB	TSC	CUK	PAR	VOJ	NPZ	VOZ	RDK
1	Red Star Belgrade (C)	37	30	7	0	96	19	+77	97	Qualification for the Champions League group stage		4–1	4–0		2–1	2–2		
2	TSC	37	22	9	6	66	32	+34	75	Qualification for the Champions League third qualifying round (Note: Due to Russian suspension, TSC were promoted from the second qualifying round to the third qualifying round.)			1–0	1–3	1–1		2–0	
3	Čukarički	37	23	6	8	65	38	+27	75	Qualification for the Europa League play-off round (Note: Awarded to third place finisher since winner of the 2022–23 Serbian Cup, Red Star Belgrade, has already qualified for 2023-24 UEFA Champions League)				1–0	1–0	4–0		2–1
4	Partizan	37	21	8	8	68	34	+34	71	Qualification for the Europa Conference League third qualifying round	0–0					2–0	2–1	2–1
5	Vojvodina	37	16	15	6	59	35	+24	63	Qualification for the Europa Conference League second qualifying round				2–2		4–0	2–0	
6	Novi Pazar	37	15	6	16	40	49	−9	51			1–4					0–1	0–1
7	Voždovac	37	13	7	17	29	52	−23	46		0–2		1–1					2–1
8	Radnički 1923	37	11	9	17	37	43	−6	42		1–1	1–4			2–2			

Source: SuperLiga (in Serbian)
Legend: Blue = home team win; Yellow = draw; Red = away team win.
Rules for classification: 1) Points; 2) Points in regular season; 3) Head-to-head points in regular season; 4) Head-to-head goal difference in regular season; 5) Head-to-head goals scored in regular season; 6) Head-to-head away goals scored in regular season (if two teams tied); 7) Goal difference; 8) Goals scored; 9) Fair play ranking; 10) Drawing of lots.
(C) Champions

=== Relegation round ===
The bottom eight teams from the regular season play in the relegation round. Teams play each other once.

==== League table ====
Pos	Team	Pld	W	D	L	GF	GA	GD	Pts	Qualification or relegation	NAP	SPA	MLA	JAV	KOL	RNI	RSU	MNS
9	Napredak Kruševac	37	10	9	18	27	37	−10	39			1–0		0–1		1–2	0–1	
10	Spartak Subotica	37	9	12	16	38	49	−11	39				2–0	3–2			2–2	
11	Mladost Lučani	37	9	11	17	40	57	−17	38		0–1						2–0	2–1
12	Javor-Matis	37	9	10	18	35	56	−21	37				0–1		2–0		0–0	0–0
13	Kolubara (Note: Kolubara got 6 points deducted due to match fixing, and was later relegated to the second tier due to multiple irregularities.) (R)	37	11	8	18	28	57	−29	35	Relegation to Serbian First League	2–2	0–3	0–1			2–1		
14	Radnički Niš (O)	37	9	8	20	37	61	−24	35	Qualification for the play-off		0–1	1–2	3–2				0–1
15	Radnik Surdulica (O)	37	8	11	18	28	50	−22	35	Qualification for the play-off					2–1	1–0		1–1
16	Mladost GAT (R)	37	6	12	19	25	49	−24	30	Relegation to Serbian First League	0–0	1–1			1–0			

Source: SuperLiga (in Serbian)
Legend: Blue = home team win; Yellow = draw; Red = away team win.
Rules for classification: 1) Points; 2) Points in regular season; 3) Head-to-head points in regular season; 4) Head-to-head goal difference in regular season; 5) Head-to-head goals scored in regular season; 6) Head-to-head away goals scored in regular season (if two teams tied); 7) Goal difference; 8) Goals scored; 9) Fair play ranking; 10) Drawing of lots.
(O) Play-Off Winner; (R) Relegated

== Relegations play-off ==
Two legged relegation play-off matches will be played between the teams placed 13th and 14th at the end of relegation round and the teams placed 3rd and 4th at the end of Serbian First League Championship round.

=== First legs ===
31 May 2023	Grafičar	1–1	Radnik Surdulica	Voždovac Stadium, Belgrade
18:00	Ivelja 64'		Jokić 87'

31 May 2023	Inđija	3–1	Radnički Niš	Inđija Stadium, Inđija
16:00	Radosavljević 7'; Stojanović 22', 81'		Pavlović 85'

=== Second legs ===
4 June 2023	Radnik Surdulica	2–0 (3–1 agg.)	Grafičar	Surdulica City Stadium, Surdulica
16:00	Radulović 40' (pen.); Makarić 89'	Report

4 June 2023	Radnički Niš	3–0 (4–3 agg.)	Inđija	Čair Stadium, Niš
18:30	Škrbić 25'; Belaković 47'; Marjanović 61' (pen.)	Report

== Individual statistics ==
=== Top scorers ===
As of matches played on 28 May 2023.

Rank	Player	Club	Goals
1	(Cape Verde) Ricardo Gomes	Partizan	19
2	(Serbia) Aleksandar Katai	Red Star	17
3	(Serbia) Petar Ratkov	TSC	13
3	(Serbia) Nikola Čumić	Vojvodina	13
5	(Israel) Bibras Natcho	Partizan	12
5	(Ghana) Osman Bukari	Red Star	12
5	(Serbia) Andrija Majdevac	Novi Pazar	12

=== Hat-tricks ===
Player	For	Against	Result	Date
(Croatia) Ante Vukušić	Kolubara	Čukarički	3–2	27 August 2022
(Cape Verde) Ricardo Gomes	Partizan	Kolubara	5–1	4 September 2022
(North Macedonia) Martin Mirčevski	TSC	Kolubara	3–1	10 September 2022
(Cape Verde) Ricardo Gomes	Partizan	Mladost Lučani	6–0	11 September 2022
(Ghana) Osman Bukari	Red Star	TSC	4–1	22 April 2023

=== Player of the week ===
As of matches played on 28 May 2023.

Round	Player	Club	Goals	Assist	Ref.
1	(Serbia) Mihajlo Banjac	TSC	1	1	
2	(Serbia) Lazar Jovanović	Radnički Niš	1	1	
3	(Serbia) Milan Pavkov	Red Star	1	0	
4	(Serbia) Petar Gigić	Javor	1	3	
5	(Serbia) Nikola Štulić	Radnički Niš ^{(2)}	2	0	
6	(Montenegro) Mirko Ivanić	Red Star ^{(2)}	1	3	
7	(Serbia) Nikola Štulić ^{(2)}	Radnički Niš ^{(3)}	2	0	
8	(Croatia) Ante Vukušić	Kolubara	3	0	
9	(The Gambia) Muhammed Badamosi	Čukarički	2	0	
10	(Cape Verde) Ricardo Gomes	Partizan	3	1	
11	(North Macedonia) Martin Mirčevski	TSC ^{(2)}	3	0	
12	(Serbia) Saša Jovanović	TSC ^{(3)}	1	1	
13	(Israel) Bibras Natcho	Partizan ^{(2)}	2	1	
14	(Serbia) Marko Gobeljić	Red Star ^{(3)}	2	0	
15	(Serbia) Kristijan Belić	Partizan ^{(3)}	1	0	
16	(Serbia) Aleksandar Pešić	Red Star ^{(4)}	2	0	
17	(Cape Verde) Ricardo Gomes ^{(2)}	Partizan ^{(4)}	1	0	
18	(Serbia) Slobodan Urošević	Partizan ^{(5)}	1	0	
19	(Serbia) Aleksandar Katai	Red Star ^{(5)}	2	0	
20	(Bosnia and Herzegovina) Strahinja Manojlović	Javor ^{(2)}	0	0	
21	(Brazil) Cristian	Mladost GAT	1	0	
22	(Ghana) Osman Bukari	Red Star ^{(6)}	2	0	
23	(Serbia) Stefan Ranđelović	Radnik Surdulica	0	0	
24	(Serbia) Dejan Zukić	Vojvodina	2	0	
25	(Serbia) Aleksandar Pešić ^{(2)}	Red Star ^{(7)}	2	0	
26	(Serbia) Vasilije Đurić	Radnički 1923	2	0	
27	(Serbia) Stefan Ranđelović ^{(2)}	Radnik Surdulica ^{(2)}	0	0	
28	(Serbia) Aleksandar Katai ^{(2)}	Red Star ^{(8)}	2	0	
29	(Serbia) Aleksandar Katai ^{(3)}	Red Star ^{(9)}	2	2	
30	(Serbia) Đorđe Ivanović	Čukarički ^{(2)}	1	0	
31	(Ghana) Osman Bukari ^{(2)}	Red Star ^{(10)}	3	0	
32	(Serbia) Nemanja Petrović	TSC ^{(4)}	1	0	
33	(North Macedonia) Miloš Tošeski	Spartak	1	2	
34	(Serbia) Nemanja Petrović ^{(2)}	TSC ^{(5)}	1	0	
35	(Serbia) Aleksandar Pejović	Radnički Niš ^{(4)}	1	1	
36	(Serbia) Petar Ratkov	TSC ^{(6)}	2	0	
37	(Serbia) Luka Stojanović	Čukarički ^{(3)}	2	0	

== Awards ==
=== Monthly awards ===
Month	Manager of the Month		Player of the Month		References
Month	Manager	Club	Player	Club	References
July	(Serbia) Žarko Lazetić	TSC	(Serbia) Veljko Simić	Vojvodina	
August	(Serbia) Vladimir Gaćinović	Novi Pazar	(Serbia) Nikola Štulić	Radnički Niš	
September	(Bosnia and Herzegovina) Dušan Kerkez	Čukarički	(Cape Verde) Ricardo Gomes	Partizan	
October	(Serbia) Miloš Milojević	Red Star	(Serbia) Aleksandar Pešić	Red Star	
February	(Serbia) Aleksandar Stanković	Novi Pazar	(Serbia) Strahinja Manojlović	Javor	
March	(Montenegro) Radoslav Batak	Vojvodina	(Serbia) Stefan Ranđelović	Radnik Surdulica	
April	(Serbia) Miloš Milojević	Red Star	(Ghana) Osman Bukari	Red Star	

=== Team of the Season ===

Serbian SuperLiga Team of the Season

Position	Player	Team
GK	(Canada) Milan Borjan	Red Star
RB	(Serbia) Miloš Cvetković	TSC
CB	(Serbia) Strahinja Eraković	Red Star
CB	(Austria) Aleksandar Dragović	Red Star
LB	(Serbia) Nemanja Tošić	Čukarički
RW	(Serbia) Saša Jovanović	TSC
CM	(Gabon) Guélor Kanga	Red Star
CM	(Serbia) Marko Docić	Čukarički
AM	(Serbia) Luka Ilić	TSC
LW	(Serbia) Aleksandar Katai	Red Star
FW	(Cape Verde) Ricardo Gomes	Partizan

=== Player of the season ===
- (Serbia) Saša Jovanović (TSC)

=== Young player of the season ===
- (Serbia) Strahinja Eraković (Red Star)

=== Coach of the season ===
- (Serbia) Miloš Milojević (Red Star)
