= Hamidou Traoré =

Malian footballer

Personal information
- Full name: Hamidou Traoré
- Date of birth: 7 October 1996 (age 30)
- Place of birth: Bamako, Mali
- Height: 1.75 m (5 ft 9 in)
- Position: Midfielder

Team information
- Current team: Sarıyer
- Number: 6

Senior career*
Years	Team	Apps	(Gls)
2012–2014	CO de Bamako		
2015–2017	Elazığspor	70	(9)
2017–2018	Karabükspor	14	(0)
2018–2021	Adana Demirspor	62	(1)
2021–2022	Giresunspor	34	(2)
2022–2023	Partizan	14	(0)
2023–2024	Al-Safa	27	(4)
2024–2025	Al-Arabi	31	(0)
2025–	Sarıyer	30	(0)

International career^{‡}
2013–2015	Mali U20	17	(2)
2013	Mali	1	(0)
- * Club domestic league appearances and goals as of 6 May 2026 ‡ National team caps and goals as of 30 September 2023

Hamidou Traoré (born 7 October 1996) is a Malian professional footballer who plays as a midfielder for Turkish club Sarıyer.

In 2022, Traoré signed with Serbian side Partizan. On 15 September 2023, Traoré joined Saudi club Al-Safa. On 23 July 2024, Traoré joined Al-Arabi. On 3 August 2025, Traoré joined Sarıyer.

He has also represented Mali at senior level.

== Honours ==
Adana Demirspor

- TFF First League: 2020–21
