= Sava Petrov =

Serbian footballer (born 1998)

Personal information
- Date of birth: 18 June 1998 (age 28)
- Place of birth: Belgrade, FR Yugoslavia
- Height: 1.90 m (6 ft 3 in)
- Positions: Forward; winger

Team information
- Current team: Hwaseong
- Number: 9

Youth career
- Partizan

Senior career*
| Years | Team | Apps | (Gls) |
| 2016–2017 | Partizan | 0 | (0) |
| 2016–2017 | → Teleoptik (loan) | 20 | (4) |
| 2017–2018 | Spartak Subotica | 1 | (0) |
| 2018–2021 | Westerlo | 44 | (4) |
| 2020–2021 | → Lierse Kempenzonen (loan) | 20 | (4) |
| 2021–2022 | Olimpija Ljubljana | 1 | (1) |
| 2022 | Mladost Lučani | 11 | (2) |
| 2022–2024 | Radnički Niš | 55 | (9) |
| 2024–2025 | Vizela | 15 | (2) |
| 2025–2026 | Železničar Pančevo | 17 | (5) |
| 2026– | Hwaseong | 16 | (7) |

International career
| 2015–2016 | Serbia U18 | 3 | (0) |
| 2016–2017 | Serbia U19 | 6 | (0) |
- * Club domestic league appearances and goals as of 5 August 2026

Sava Petrov (Serbian Cyrillic: Сава Петров; born 18 June 1998) is a Serbian professional footballer who plays as a forward or winger for K League 2 club Hwaseong.

== Club career ==
=== Partizan ===
Born in Belgrade, Petrov came through Partizan's youth system, where he was mentored by Darko Tešović. He joined the first team in 2016, making a debut in a friendly against Beroe Stara Zagora in May same year. In August 2016, Petrov signed his first professional contract with the club on five-year deal. Shortly after, he was loaned to the satellite club Teleoptik at one-year spell. Collecting 20 matches with 4 goals for the season, Petrov contributed in winning the Serbian League Belgrade for the 2016–17 campaign. In the meantime, Petrov had been connected with Borussia Dortmund in the mid-season, but failed to sign a contract with the German club. He also stayed with Partizan, training with the first team and playing with reserves respectively, making several matches in unofficial competition named Serbian B League. Although he did not make any appearances during the season, Petrov had been awarded for winning the 2016–17 Serbian SuperLiga campaign. He lost his medal during the celebration, which was given back to him from a fan who had found it on the field. In summer 2017, Petrov passed the pre-season with Partizan, after which he moved back to training with Teleoptik before the 2017–18 Serbian First League campaign. Failing to make any official appearance with Partizan as a senior, Petrov mutually terminated a contract and left the club as a free agent in August 2017.

=== Spartak Subotica ===
At the beginning of September 2017, Petrov joined Spartak Subotica as a single player, penning a three-year contract with the club. Through the regular season, Petrov was usually used as a back-up player under coach Aleksandar Veselinović. Next he left the club, Petrov spent several successive matches on the bench in the play-off season under Vladimir Gaćinović. Petrov made his professional debut in 3–0 away defeat against Čukarički on 29 April 2018, replacing Bojan Čečarić in 37 minte of the match. At the beginning of the summer pre-season, Petrov missed the first training on 10 June 2018.

=== Westerlo ===
On 18 June 2018, Petrov joined the Belgian First Division B side Westerlo on a three-year deal. On 26 August 2020, he was loaned out to Lierse Kempenzonen for the 2020–21 season.

=== Olimpija Ljubljana ===
On 2 July 2021, Petrov signed a two-year contract with Slovenian PrvaLiga side Olimpija Ljubljana.

=== Vizela ===
On 30 January 2024, Petrov left Radnički Niš and moved to Portugal, joining Primeira Liga club Vizela.

== International career ==
Petrov was invited to the Serbia under-17 national team in 2015. He made his debut for the team in a friendly match against Slovenia on 26 February of the same year. As a coach of Serbia national under-18 football team, Ivan Tomić called Petrov into the squad in summer 2015. Petrov played with the team as a regular member until 2016, scoring a goal in a match against Hungary on 21 April 2016. In September 2016, Petrov made his debut for Serbian under-19 level, scoring in the opening match of the memorial tournament "Stevan Vilotić - Ćele", against the United States. While with the team, he also scored in a 4–1 victory over Bulgaria on 23 February 2017.

== Style of play ==
Standing at 1.87 m, Petrov is a right-footed footballer, who mainly operates as an attacker. Petrov is capable of playing as a winger or centre forward in different occasions and tactical settings. Petrov is described as a versatile player with a good vision of the game who likes to dribble and going face to face with the opponent, and is recognized for his speed and finishing.

== Career statistics ==
As of 18 June 2018

Appearances and goals by club, season and competition
| Club | Season | League | | | National cup | | Continental | | Other | | Total | |
| Club | Season | Division | Apps | Goals | Apps | Goals | Apps | Goals | Apps | Goals | Apps | Goals |
|---|---|---|---|---|---|---|---|---|---|---|---|---|
| Partizan | 2016–17 | Serbian SuperLiga | 0 | 0 | — | | 0 | 0 | — | | 0 | 0 |
| Teleoptik (loan) | 2016–17 | Serbian League Belgrade | 20 | 4 | — | | — | | — | | 20 | 4 |
| Spartak Subotica | 2017–18 | Serbian SuperLiga | 1 | 0 | 0 | 0 | — | | — | | 1 | 0 |
| Westerlo | 2018–19 | Belgian First Division B | 0 | 0 | 0 | 0 | — | | — | | 0 | 0 |
| Career total | | | 21 | 4 | 0 | 0 | 0 | 0 | 0 | 0 | 21 | 4 |

== Honours ==
Partizan

- Serbian SuperLiga: 2016–17

Teleoptik

- Serbian League Belgrade: 2016–17
