= Filip Damjanović =

Serbian footballer

Personal information
- Date of birth: 2 July 1998 (age 28)
- Place of birth: Belgrade, FR Yugoslavia
- Height: 1.88 m (6 ft 2 in)
- Position: Centre-back

Team information
- Current team: Koper
- Number: 33

Youth career
- 2017–2022: Voždovac
- 2017–2018: → IMT (loan)
- 2019: → IMT (loan)

Senior career*
Years	Team	Apps	(Gls)
2019–2023	IMT	36	(1)
2023–2024	Voždovac	63	(0)
2024–2025	Konyaspor	18	(0)
2025–	Koper	6	(0)

International career^{‡}
2023–	Serbia	1	(0)
- * Club domestic league appearances and goals as of 22 November 2025 ‡ National team caps and goals as of 21:07, 19 August 2024 (UTC)

Filip Damjanović (Serbian: Филип Дамјановић; born 2 July 1998) is a Serbian professional footballer who plays as a centre-back for Slovenian PrvaLiga club Koper and the Serbia national team.

== Club career ==
On 18 February 2016, Damjanović signed his first professional contract with FK Voždovac for 3 seasons. In the summer of 2017, he joined FK IMT on loan but was sidelined by an injury to his meniscus and anterior cruciate ligament. On 2 February 2019, he formally transferred to FK IMT where he stayed for 3 seasons. On 18 January 2023, he returned to FK Voždovac. On 24 January 2024, he transferred to the Turkish Süper Lig club Konyaspor on a 2+5 year contract.

== International career ==
Damjanović was called up to the Serbia national team for a friendly match against the United States in January 2023.

== Honours ==
FK IMT

- Serbian League Belgrade: 2019–2020
