= Jovan Marinković =

Serbian footballer (born 1996)

Personal information
- Date of birth: 12 September 1996 (age 30)
- Place of birth: Niš, FR Yugoslavia
- Height: 1.85 m (6 ft 1 in)
- Position: Centre-back

Team information
- Current team: Novi Pazar
- Number: 23

Youth career
- Radnički Niš

Senior career*
Years	Team	Apps	(Gls)
2015–2017	Sinđelić Niš	39	(2)
2017	BSK Borča	3	(0)
2017–2018	Sinđelić Niš	27	(1)
2018–2019	Javor Ivanjica	1	(0)
2019–2020	Bačka Palanka	20	(0)
2020–2022	Napredak Kruševac	48	(2)
2022	Radnicki Sremska Mitrovica	6	(1)
2023	Spartak Subotica	13	(0)
2023–2024	Napredak Kruševac	45	(2)
2025	Al-Khaldiya SC	2	(0)
2025–	Novi Pazar	30	(2)
- * Club domestic league appearances and goals as of 12 June 2026

Jovan Marinković (Serbian Cyrillic: Јован Маринковић; born 12 September 1996) is a Serbian professional footballer who plays as a centre-back for Novi Pazar.

== Club career ==
Born in Niš, Marinković came through the Radnički Niš youth academy. After he completed he graduated, he moved to the local club Sinđelić. Shortly after signing with the club, Marinković was elected captain for the 2015–16 season. Playing with Sinđelić, Marinković made 39 appearances and scored two goals in the Serbian League East. In early February 2017, Marinković moved to Serbian First League side BSK Borča. He made his debut against Budućnost Dobanovci.

== Career statistics ==
=== Club ===
As of 28 March 2017

Club	Season	League			Cup		Continental		Other		Total	
Club	Season	Division	Apps	Goals	Apps	Goals	Apps	Goals	Apps	Goals	Apps	Goals
Sinđelić Niš	2015–16	League East	25	2	—		—		—		25	2
Sinđelić Niš	2016–17	League East	14	0	—		—		—		14	0
Sinđelić Niš	Total		39	2	—		—		—		39	2
BSK Borča	2016–17	First League	3	0	—		—		—		3	0
Career total			42	2	—		—		—		42	2
