= Marko Docić =

Serbian footballer

Personal information
- Full name: Marko Docić
- Date of birth: 21 April 1993 (age 33)
- Place of birth: Belgrade, FR Yugoslavia
- Height: 1.78 m (5 ft 10 in)
- Position: Central midfielder

Team information
- Current team: Čukarički
- Number: 5

Senior career*
| Years | Team | Apps | (Gls) |
| 2010–2011 | Radnički Obrenovac | 52 | (5) |
| 2012–2013 | Srem Jakovo | 36 | (7) |
| 2013–2016 | Javor Ivanjica | 87 | (11) |
| 2016– | Čukarički | 260 | (47) |
- * Club domestic league appearances and goals as of 12 June 2026

Marko Docić (Serbian Cyrillic: Марко Доцић; born 21 April 1993) is a Serbian footballer who plays as a central midfielder for Čukarički.

== Club career ==
Marko made his debut in the Serbian League Belgrade defending the colors of the Radnički Obrenovac. After two seasons, the midfielder moved to another team in the Serbian League Belgrade, Srem Jakovo for which he played one season.

From 2013 to 2016, Docić played for Javor Ivanjica. On 1 July 2016, he was purchased outright for 100,000 euros by the Serbian team Čukarički, where he is now the captain.

== Honours ==
Individual

- Serbian SuperLiga Player of the Week: 2020–21 (Round 3)
- Serbian SuperLiga Team of the Season: 2022–23
