= 2025–26 FK Partizan season =

FK Partizan 79th season

FK Partizan
2025–26 season
- President: Rasim Ljajić
- Head coach: Srđan Blagojević (until 2 November 2025); Marko Jovanović/Đorđije Ćetković (until 13 November 2025); Nenad Stojaković (until 23 February 2026); Damir Čakar (until 9 March 2026); Srđan Blagojević
- Stadium: Partizan Stadium
- Serbian SuperLiga: 3nd
- Serbian Cup: Round of 32
- Europa League: First qualifying round
- Conference League: Third qualifying round
- Top goalscorer: League: Jovan Milošević (12); All: Jovan Milošević (16)
| Home colours | Away colours | Third colours |
- All statistics correct as of 23 May 2026.

The 2025–26 season is Fudbalski klub Partizan's 79th season in existence and the club's 20th competing in the Serbian SuperLiga.

== Transfers ==
=== In ===
| Date | Position | Name | From | Type | Ref. |
|---|---|---|---|---|---|
| 13 June 2025 | DF | (Serbia) Mateja Milovanović | (Netherlands) Heerenveen | Free transfer | |
| 19 June 2025 | GK | (Serbia) Marko Milošević | (Serbia) Radnički 1923 | Free transfer | |
| 23 June 2025 | DF | (Montenegro) Stefan Milić | (Russia) Chernomorets | Free transfer | |
| 23 June 2025 | MF | (Bulgaria) Yanis Karabelyov | (Bulgaria) Botev Plovdiv | Free transfer | |
| 24 June 2025 | DF | (Serbia) Ivan Vasiljević | (Spain) Collado Villalba | Free transfer | |
| 24 June 2025 | FW | (Montenegro) Andrej Kostić | (Montenegro) Budućnost Podgorica | Transfer | |
| 27 June 2025 | FW | (Senegal) Demba Seck | (Italy) Torino | Loan | |
| 24 July 2025 | DF | (Nigeria) Abdulmalik Mohammed | (Nigeria) Bethel Sporting | Transfer | |
| 24 July 2025 | MF | (Nigeria) Samson Nwulu | (Nigeria) Fima | Transfer | |
| 18 January 2026 | FW | (Germany) Sebastian Polter | (Germany) Eintracht Braunschweig | Free transfer | |
| 29 January 2026 | DF | (Serbia) Stefan Mitrović | (Belgium) Gent | Free transfer | |
| 29 January 2026 | MF | (Serbia) Saša Zdjelar | Unattached | Free transfer | |

=== Out ===
| Date | Position | Name | To | Type | Ref. |
|---|---|---|---|---|---|
| 30 May 2025 | MF | (Bosnia and Herzegovina) Stefan Kovač | (Russia) Baltika | Transfer | |
| 4 June 2025 | FW | (Serbia) Nemanja Nikolić | (Thailand) Buriram United | Free transfer | |
| 18 June 2025 | FW | (South Korea) Goh Young-jun | (Poland) Górnik Zabrze | Transfer | |
| 20 June 2025 | GK | (Serbia) Aleksandar Jovanović | (Turkey) Kocaelispor | Transfer | |
| 20 June 2025 | DF | (Serbia) Bojan Kovačević | (Spain) Cádiz | Transfer | |
| 26 June 2025 | MF | (Montenegro) Aleksandar Šćekić | (Montenegro) Sutjeska Nikšić | Free transfer | |
| 28 June 2025 | DF | (Bosnia and Herzegovina) Nihad Mujakić | (Turkey) Eyüpspor | Loan | |
| 2 July 2025 | MF | (Honduras) Kervin Arriaga | (Spain) Levante | Transfer | |
| 2 July 2025 | MF | (Serbia) Mihajlo Petrović | (Serbia) OFK Beograd | Transfer | |
| 8 July 2025 | MF | (Serbia) Mateja Stjepanović | (Portugal) Moreirense | Transfer | |
| 9 July 2025 | DF | (Serbia) Zlatan Šehović | (Czech Republic) Dukla Prague | Free transfer | |
| 30 July 2025 | DF | (Serbia) Marko Kerkez | (Netherlands) Fortuna Sittard | Free transfer | |
| 5 August 2025 | DF | (Serbia) Aleksandar Filipović | (Latvia) RFS | Free transfer | |
| 23 August 2025 | MF | (Senegal) Pape Fuhrer | (Portugal) Estrela da Amadora | Free transfer | |
| 18 September 2025 | MF | (Serbia) Zoran Alilović | (Serbia) Novi Pazar | Loan | |
| 24 September 2025 | MF | (Nigeria) Samson Nwulu | (Serbia) Novi Pazar | Loan | |
| 16 October 2025 | MF | (Democratic Republic of the Congo) Aldo Kalulu | Unattached | Released | |
| 8 January 2026 | FW | (Ghana) Ibrahim Zubairu | (Turkey) Çorum | Loan | |
| 9 January 2026 | FW | (Serbia) Jovan Milošević | (Germany) VfB Stuttgart | Loan return | |
| 9 January 2026 | FW | (Serbia) Dušan Jovanović | (Serbia) Železničar Pančevo | Free transfer | |
| 10 January 2026 | MF | (Peru) Joao Grimaldo | (Czech Republic) Sparta Prague | Transfer | |
| 17 January 2026 | DF | (Bosnia and Herzegovina) Nihad Mujakić | (Turkey) Gaziantep | Loan | |
| 23 January 2026 | GK | (Serbia) Vukašin Jovanović | (Serbia) Jedinstvo Ub | Free transfer | |
| 3 February 2026 | DF | (Serbia) Ivan Vasiljević | (Spain) Rayo Cantabria | Loan | |
| 11 February 2026 | MF | (Bulgaria) Yanis Karabelyov | (Sweden) Malmö FF | Transfer | |
| 11 March 2026 | MF | (Ghana) Leonard Owusu | (Norway) Fredrikstad | Loan | |

== Players ==
=== Squad ===
| No. | Name | Nationality | Position (s) | Date of Birth (Age) | Signed from | Notes |
Goalkeepers
| 1 | Marko Milošević | (Serbia) | GK | 7 February 1991 (age 35) | (Serbia) Radnički 1923 | |
| 31 | Miloš Krunić | (Serbia) | GK | 22 November 1996 (age 29) | (Saudi Arabia) Hajer | |
| 41 | Tarik Banjić | (Bosnia and Herzegovina) | GK | 2 February 2008 (age 18) | Youth system | |
Defenders
| 2 | Aranđel Stojković | (Serbia) | RB | 2 March 1995 (age 31) | (Serbia) TSC | |
| 4 | Mario Jurčević | (Slovenia) | LB | 1 June 1995 (age 31) | (Cyprus) Apollon Limassol | |
| 5 | Mateja Milovanović | (Serbia) | CB | 18 April 2004 (age 22) | (Netherlands) Heerenveen | |
| 13 | Abdulmalik Mohammed | (Nigeria) | LB | 9 May 2007 (age 19) | (Nigeria) Bethel Sporting | |
| 23 | Stefan Mitrović | (Serbia) | CB | 22 May 1990 (age 36) | (Belgium) KAA Gent | |
| 24 | Vukašin Đurđević | (Serbia) | RB | 24 January 2004 (age 22) | (Serbia) Voždovac | |
| 30 | Milan Roganović | (Montenegro) | RB | 28 October 2005 (age 21) | (Montenegro) Zeta | |
| 33 | Stefan Petrović | (Serbia) | LB | 1 March 2008 (age 18) | Youth system | |
| 40 | Nikola Simić | (Serbia) | CB | 30 March 2007 (age 19) | Youth system | |
| 44 | Stefan Milić | (Montenegro) | CB | 6 July 2000 (age 26) | (Russia) Chernomorets | |
| 50 | Milan Lazarević | (Serbia) | RB | 10 January 1997 (age 29) | (Serbia) Vojvodina | |
Midfielders
| 6 | Vanja Dragojević | (Serbia) | DM | 11 January 2006 (age 20) | Youth system | Vice-captain |
| 10 | Bibars Natcho | (Israel) | CM | 18 February 1988 (age 38) | (Greece) Olympiacos | Captain |
| 11 | Milan Vukotić | (Montenegro) | AM | 5 October 2002 (age 24) | (Montenegro) Budućnost Podgorica | |
| 14 | Saša Zdjelar | (Serbia) | DM | 20 March 1995 (age 31) | (Russia) Zenit | |
| 29 | Ghayas Zahid | (Norway) | MF | 8 September 1994 (age 32) | (Turkey) Ankaragücü | |
| 36 | Ognjen Ugrešić | (Serbia) | CM | 15 July 2006 (age 20) | Youth system | Vice-captain |
| 70 | Dimitrije Janković | (Serbia) | CM | 27 February 2006 (age 20) | Youth system | |
| 88 | Dušan Makević | (Serbia) | DM | 30 April 2007 (age 19) | Youth system | |
Forwards
| 9 | Andrej Kostić | (Montenegro) | CF | 16 January 2007 (age 19) | (Montenegro) Budućnost Podgorica | |
| 19 | Demba Seck | (Senegal) | RW | 10 February 2001 (age 25) | (Italy) Torino | Loan |
| 32 | Nemanja Trifunović | (Serbia) | LW | 29 June 2004 (age 22) | Youth system | |
| 42 | Matija Ninić | (Serbia) | RW | 13 March 2006 (age 20) | Youth system | |
| 77 | Ivan Martinović | (Serbia) | LW | 31 May 2007 (age 19) | Youth system | |
| 46 | Marko Lekić | (Serbia) | CF | 3 August 2003 (age 23) | Youth system | |
| 79 | Dušan Jovanović | (Serbia) | LW | 7 February 2008 (age 18) | Youth system | |
| 91 | Sebastian Polter | (Germany) | ST | 1 April 1991 (age 35) | (Germany) Eintracht Braunschweig | |
| 99 | Bogdan Kostić | (Serbia) | ST | 17 January 2007 (age 19) | Youth system | |

== Friendlies ==
| 21 June 2025 Friendly | Partizan (Serbia) | 1–0 | (Serbia) Radnički Niš | Stara Pazova, Serbia |
| | B. Kostić | Report | | Stadium: Serbian FA Sports Center |

| 26 June 2025 Friendly | Partizan (Serbia) | 1–2 | (Russia) Rodina Moscow | Stara Pazova, Serbia |
| | Jurčević 34' | Report | Maksimenko 24'; Timoshenko 67' | Stadium: Serbian FA Sports Center |

| 1 July 2025 Friendly | CSKA Moscow (Russia) | 3–1 | (Serbia) Partizan | Moscow, Russia |
| 18:00 | Maksimenko 15'; Ugrešić 57' (o.g.); Kislyak 61' | Report | Roganović 25' | Stadium: VEB Arena; Attendance: 18,000; Referee: (Russia) Vitali Meshkov |

| 4 July 2025 Friendly | Dynamo Moscow (Russia) | 3–1 | (Serbia) Partizan | Moscow, Russia |
| 18:00 | Makarov 6'; Fomin 60'; Stepanov 78' | Report | J, Milošević 20' | Stadium: VTB Arena; Referee: (Russia) Sergei Karasev |

| 27 July 2025 Friendly | Partizan (Serbia) | 0–2 | (Serbia) Smederevo 1924 | Belgrade, Serbia |
| 18:30 | | Report | Balabanović | Stadium: SC Partizan-Teleoptik |

| 6 September 2025 Friendly | Partizan (Serbia) | 5–4 | (Serbia) Železničar Pančevo | Belgrade, Serbia |
| | Jovanović; Natcho; Seck | Report | Jasper; Karikari; Kuljanin; Cvetković | Stadium: SC Partizan-Teleoptik |

| 10 January 2026 Friendly | Partizan (Serbia) | 2–2 | (Hungary) ETO FC Győr | Antalya, Turkey |
| 14:00 | Ninić 9'; Janković 18' | Report | Gavrić 27'; Njie 89' |

| 14 January 2026 Friendly | Partizan (Serbia) | 0–3 | (Slovenia) Mura | Antalya, Turkey |
| 15:00 | | Report | Krupić 14'; Vizinger 43'; Ljukovac 45' |

| 18 January 2026 Friendly | Partizan (Serbia) | 1–1 | (Poland) Raków Częstochowa | Antalya, Turkey |
| 15:00 |

== Competitions ==
=== Overview ===
| Competition | Record | | | | | | | |
| Competition | P | W | D | L | GF | GA | GD | Win % |
|---|---|---|---|---|---|---|---|---|
| Serbian SuperLiga | 37 | 22 | 7 | 8 | 72 | 45 | +27 | 59.46 |
| Serbian Cup | 1 | 0 | 0 | 1 | 0 | 2 | −2 | 0.00 |
| Europa League | 2 | 1 | 0 | 1 | 2 | 2 | +0 | 50.00 |
| Conference League | 4 | 3 | 0 | 1 | 9 | 4 | +5 | 75.00 |
| Total | 44 | 26 | 7 | 11 | 83 | 53 | +30 | 59.09 |

==== Results by matchday ====
| Round | 1 | 2 | 3 | 4 | 5 | 6 | 7 | 8 | 9 | 10 | 11 | 12 | 13 | 14 | 15 | 16 | 17 | 18 | 19 | 20 | 21 | 22 | 23 | 24 | 25 | 26 | 27 | 28 | 29 | 30 |
|---|---|---|---|---|---|---|---|---|---|---|---|---|---|---|---|---|---|---|---|---|---|---|---|---|---|---|---|---|---|---|
| Ground | A | A | H | A | H | A | H | A | H | A | H | A | H | A | H | H | H | A | H | A | H | A | H | A | H | A | H | A | H | A |
| Result | W | W | W | W | W | D | W | W | L | W | W | W | W | L | W | L | W | W | W | L | D | W | W | L | L | L | W | D | D | W |
| Position | 6 | 6 | 5 | 2 | 2 | 1 | 1 | 1 | 2 | 2 | 2 | 2 | 2 | 2 | 1 | 1 | 1 | 1 | 1 | 1 | 2 | 2 | 2 | 2 | 2 | 2 | 2 | 3 | 3 | 3 |

Updated to match(es) played on 9 April 2026. Source: Partizan
A = Away; H = Home; W = Win; D = Draw; L = Loss

=== Results ===
| 20 July 2025 1 | Železničar Pančevo | 0–1 | Partizan | Pančevo |
| 20:00 | Jovanović (yellow card) 43'; Vidojević (yellow card) 84'; Milikić (yellow card) 90+9' | Report | Ugrešić (yellow card) 86'; A. Kostić 90+7' | Stadium: SRC Mladost Pančevo; Attendance: 3,500; Referee: (Serbia) Milan Mitić |

| 5 November 2025* 2 | Javor Ivanjica | 2–3 | Partizan | Ivanjica |
| 17:00 | Pantelić 25' (pen.); Zuvić 34'; Ilić (yellow card) 67' | Report | Milić (yellow card) 20'; J. Milošević 21', 69'; Zubairu (yellow card) 44'; Natcho 58' (pen.) | Stadium: Javor Stadium; Attendance: 2,000; Referee: (Serbia) Marko Ivković |

| 3 August 2025 3 | Partizan | 2–1 | Radnički 1923 | Belgrade |
| 21:00 | Vukotić 53'; Stojković 90+3' | Report | Adžić (yellow card) 2'; Ben Hassine 45+3'; Bevis (yellow card) 55'; Dadić (yellow card) 56'; Bukumira (yellow card) 69'; Skrobonja (yellow card) 89' | Stadium: Partizan Stadium; Attendance: 5,000; Referee: (Serbia) Danilo Nikolić |

| 10 August 2025 4 | Napredak Kruševac | 2–7 | Partizan | Kruševac |
| 20:30 | Majdevac 53' 54' | Report | J. Milošević 31'; Natcho 38'; B. Kostić 40', 57'; Karabelyov (yellow card) 52'; A. Kostić 60', 85'; Đurđević 90' | Stadium: Mladost Stadium; Attendance: 4,000; Referee: (Serbia) Nenad Minaković |

| 18 August 2025 5 | Partizan | 5–1 | IMT | Belgrade |
| 19:00 | Seck 21', 28'; J. Milošević 40'; Đurđević (yellow card) 63'; A. Kostić 75'; Vukotić 83' | Report | Zulfić (yellow card) 20'; Karamoko (yellow card) 43'; Bonnet 51' (yellow card) 53'; Luković (yellow card) 71'; Sissako (yellow card) 79' | Stadium: Partizan Stadium; Attendance: 4,000; Referee: (Serbia) Aleksandar Živković |

| 24 August 2025 6 | Radnički Niš | 2–2 | Partizan | Niš |
| 19:30 | V. Ilić (yellow card) 22'; M. Ilić (yellow card) 30'; Srećković (yellow card) 34'; Petrović 37'; Mijailović (yellow card) 65'; Bosić 73' (yellow card) 90+5'; Vitas (yellow card) 80' | Report | J. Milošević 17'; Ugrešić (yellow card) 45'; Karabelyov 76' | Stadium: Čair Stadium; Attendance: 6,708; Referee: (Serbia) Novak Simović |

| 30 August 2025 7 | Partizan | 2–0 | Radnik Surdulica | Belgrade |
| 19:30 | A. Kostić 71'; Natcho 90+1' (pen.) | Report | Stevanović (yellow card) 48'; Bogdanović (yellow card) 48'; Abubakar (yellow card) 58' | Stadium: Partizan Stadium; Attendance: 3,217; Referee: (Serbia) Stanko Ostraćanin |

| 14 September 2025 8 | Spartak Ždrepčeva Krv | 2–5 | Partizan | Subotica |
| 19:30 | Kolarić (yellow card) 48'; Tomović 69' (pen.); Osei 78' | Report | Simić 21'; J. Milošević 37' (yellow card) 59'; Jurčević 64'; Vukotić 70'; A. Kostić 89' | Stadium: Subotica City Stadium; Attendance: 2,800; Referee: (Serbia) Dejan Trifković |

| 20 September 2025 9 | Partizan | 1–2 | Red Star Belgrade | Belgrade |
| 19:00 | J. Milošević 74'; Roganović (yellow card) 90'; A. Kostić (yellow card) 90+6' | Report | Elšnik 28'; Tiknizyan (yellow card) 47'; Radonjić 60' | Stadium: Partizan Stadium; Attendance: 24,500; Referee: (Serbia) Nenad Minaković |

| 27 September 2025 10 | OFK Beograd | 0–2 | Partizan | Zaječar |
| 18:30 | | Report | Karabelyov (yellow card) 23'; Dragojević 43'; Milić (yellow card) 69'; J. Milošević 77' | Stadium: Kraljevica Stadium; Attendance: 4,000; Referee: (Serbia) David Matić |

| 4 October 2025 11 | Partizan | 1–0 | Vojvodina | Belgrade |
| 20:30 | Milić (yellow card) 13'; J. Milošević 18' (pen.); Stojković (yellow card) 90+9'; Roganović (yellow card) 90+24' | Report | Petrović (yellow card) 22'; Tanjga (red card) 30'; Mustapha (yellow card) 85'; Vidosavljević (yellow card) 90+19'; Barros (yellow card) 90+24' | Stadium: Partizan Stadium; Attendance: 12,000; Referee: (Serbia) Aleksandar Živković |

| 18 October 2025 12 | TSC | 0–1 | Partizan | Bačka Topola |
| 18:30 | Capan (yellow card) 33'; Singh (yellow card) 52'; Jovanović (yellow card) 61' | Report | Karabelyov 42'; Vukotić (yellow card) 74' | Stadium: TSC Arena; Attendance: 4,000; Referee: (Serbia) Milan Ilić |

| 24 October 2025 13 | Partizan | 3–0 | Mladost Lučani | Belgrade |
| 17:30 | B. Kostić 32'; A. Kostić 59'; Trifunović (yellow card) 80'; Seck 84' | Report | Ćirić (yellow card) 10' | Stadium: Partizan Stadium; Attendance: 0 Referee: (Serbia) Srđan Jovanović |

| 1 November 2025 14 | Čukarički | 4–1 | Partizan | Belgrade |
| 18:00 | Nikčević 7'; Mijailović (yellow card) 10'; Miladinović (yellow card) 27'; Tedić 29' (pen.) (yellow card) 68'; Stojanović (yellow card) 42'; Mirković (yellow card) 57'; Docić (yellow card) 71'; Sissoko (yellow card) 82'; Miletić 89'; Matijašević 90+5'; Vadze (yellow card) 90+7' | Report | Seck (yellow card) 41'; Dragojević (yellow card) 90+7'; Zubairu 56'; Roganović (yellow card) 57' | Stadium: Čukarički Stadium; Attendance: 1,200; Referee: (Serbia) Predrag Janjuš |

| 9 November 2025 15 | Partizan | 2–0 | Novi Pazar | Belgrade |
| 18:30 | Ugrešić 33'; Milić (yellow card) 42'; B. Kostić (yellow card) 54'; Natcho 76'; Dragojević (yellow card) 78' | Report | Marinković (yellow card) 31' | Stadium: Partizan Stadium; Attendance: 0 Referee: (Serbia) Danilo Nikolić |

| 22 November 2025 16 | Partizan | 1–3 | Železničar Pančevo | Belgrade |
| 18:30 | Trifunović 7' | Report | Jasper 19'; Karikari 33' (yellow card) 33'; Grgić 66'; Jovanović (yellow card) 73'; Popović (yellow card) 85'; Zečević (yellow card) 90' | Stadium: Partizan Stadium; Attendance: 1,500; Referee: (Serbia) Pavle Ilić |

| 29 November 2025 17 | Partizan | 4–0 | Javor Matis | Belgrade |
| 18:30 | Ugrešić 33', 75'; A. Kostić 86'; Vukotić 89' | Report | Doucouré (yellow card) 46'; Petrović (yellow card) 63' | Stadium: Partizan Stadium; Attendance: 1,000; Referee: (Serbia) Miloš Milanović |

| 7 December 2025 18 | Radnički 1923 | 2–4 | Partizan | Kragujevac |
| 15:00 | Marjanović (yellow card) 35'; Bevis 39'; Ilić (yellow card) 40'; Tanjga (yellow card) 43' (yellow-red card) 70'; Ben Hassine (yellow card) 59'; Sokler 81' | Report | Trifunović 39'; J. Milošević 22', 61'; Đurđević (yellow card) 46'; Natcho 71' (pen.) | Stadium: Čika Dača Stadium; Attendance: 3,500; Referee: (Serbia) Stanko Ostraćanin |

| 13 December 2025 19 | Partizan | 3–2 | Napredak Kruševac | Belgrade |
| 18:30 | Ugrešić 36'; J. Milošević 40' (pen.); Trifunović 68' (yellow card) 90+8'; Karabelyov (yellow card) 90+1' | Report | Zličić (yellow card) 31'; Bukorac (yellow card) 43'; Drobnjak (yellow card) 47' (goal) 36'; Vulić 54' (yellow card) 90+3'; Majdevac 57'; Vukajlović (yellow card) 87' (yellow-red card) 90+4' | Stadium: Partizan Stadium; Attendance: 12,300; Referee: (Serbia) Milan Šutulović |

| 20 December 2025 20 | IMT | 1–0 | Partizan | Loznica |
| 18:00 | Novičić (yellow card) 4'; Milanović 47'; Luković (yellow card) 88'; Radočaj (yellow card) 90' | Report | Stojković (yellow card) 24'; Jovanović (yellow card) 88'; Milić (yellow card) 90+2' | Stadium: Lagator Stadium; Attendance: 1,000; Referee: (Serbia) Pavle Ilić |

| 31 January 2026 21 | Partizan | 0–0 | Radnički Niš | Belgrade |
| 15:00 | Dragojević (yellow card) 6'; Milić (yellow card) 90+1'; Roganović (yellow card) 90+5' | Report | Kanouté (red card) 37'; Vitas (yellow card) 47'; Manojlović (yellow card) 84'; Mustapha (yellow card) 90+1' | Stadium: Partizan Stadium; Referee: (Serbia) Milan Mitić |

| 7 February 2026 22 | Radnik Surdulica | 2–3 | Partizan | Surdulica |
| 14:00 | Abubakar (yellow card) 1' (goal) 5'; Gašić 90+1' | Report | Hajdarević 8' (o.g.); Seck 24', 38' (yellow card) 71'; Simić (yellow card) 37'; A. Kostić (yellow card) 55' | Stadium: Surdulica City Stadium; Attendance: 1,600; Referee: (Serbia) Marko Ivković |

| 14 February 2026 23 | Partizan | 2–1 | Spartak Ždrepčeva Krv | Belgrade |
| 15:00 | Dragojević 24'; A. Kostić 48' | Report | Osei (yellow card) 21'; Bešić (yellow card) 33'; Krsmanović (yellow card) 71'; Trajković 77' | Stadium: Partizan Stadium; Attendance: 2,700; Referee: (Serbia) Novak Simović |

| 22 February 2026 24 | Red Star Belgrade | 3–0 | Partizan | Belgrade |
| 17:00 | Kostov 45+5'; Arnautović 56'; Katai 77'; Krunić (yellow card) 80' | Report | Milić (yellow card) 45+4' | Stadium: Rajko Mitić Stadium; Attendance: 42,000; Referee: (Serbia) Pavle Ilić |

| 28 February 2026 25 | Partizan | 1–2 | OFK Beograd | Belgrade |
| 18:30 | A. Kostić 20'; Petrović (yellow card) 55'; Seck (yellow card) 57' | Report | Rodić 44', 90+5' (yellow card) 8'; Momčilović (yellow card) 51' | Stadium: Partizan Stadium; Referee: (Serbia) Milan Ilić |

| 8 March 2026 26 | Vojvodina | 3–0 | Partizan | Novi Sad |
| 18:00 | Savićević 43'; Barros (yellow card) 66'; Veličković 90+5' (pen.); Mary 90+8' (pen.) | Report | Trifunović (yellow card) 90+2' | Stadium: Karađorđe Stadium; Attendance: 4,000; Referee: (Serbia) Srđan Jovanović |

| 14 March 2026 27 | Partizan | 2–1 | TSC | Belgrade |
| 16:00 | Dragojević 6'; Đurđević 35' | Report | Milosavić 40'; Krstić (yellow card) 71'; Urošević (yellow card) 90+8' | Stadium: Partizan Stadium; Attendance: 2,500; Referee: (Serbia) Miloš Milanović |

| 21 March 2026 28 | Mladost Lučani | 1–1 | Partizan | Lučani |
| 18:30 | Ćirić 6'; Đurđević (red card) 35' | Report | Polter 89'; Zdjelar (yellow card) 90+1' | Stadium: SRC Mr Radoš Milovanović; Attendance: 500; Referee: (Serbia) Dejan Trifković |

| 5 April 2026 29 | Partizan | 0–0 | Čukarički | Belgrade |
| 19:00 | Ugrešić (yellow card) 87' | Report | Stojanović (yellow card) 12' (yellow-red card) 40'; Sissoko (yellow card) 75'; Tedić (yellow card) 79' | Stadium: Partizan Stadium; Attendance: 3,000; Referee: (Serbia) Danilo Nikolić |

| 9 April 2026 30 | Novi Pazar | 2–3 | Partizan | Novi Pazar |
| 17:00 | Sadi (yellow card) 13'; Mirosavić (yellow card) 19'; Camaj 45+1'; Kotzebue 52' | Report | Seck 3' (yellow card) 38'; Polter 50'; Vukotić 56'; Zdjelar (yellow card) 90+1' | Stadium: Novi Pazar City Stadium; Attendance: 0 Referee: (Serbia) Pavle Ilić |

==== Championship round ====
| Pos | Team | Pld | W | D | L | GF | GA | GD | Pts | Qualification | RSB | VOJ | PAR | ZEL | NPZ | OFK | RAD | CUK |
|---|---|---|---|---|---|---|---|---|---|---|---|---|---|---|---|---|---|---|
| 1 | Red Star Belgrade (C) | 37 | 27 | 5 | 5 | 100 | 31 | +69 | 86 | Qualification for the Champions League second qualifying round | | 4–1 | 3–0 | | 1–2 | 1–2 | | |
| 2 | Vojvodina | 37 | 23 | 7 | 7 | 66 | 35 | +31 | 76 | Qualification for the Europa League first qualifying round (Note: The winner of the 2025–26 Serbian Cup (Red Star Belgrade) qualifies for the Europa League first qualifying round. Since the champions won the cup, the second place team takes the Europa League berth and the fourth place team gets a Conference League berth.) | | | 0–0 | 0–0 | 3–0 | | | 1–0 |
| 3 | Partizan | 37 | 22 | 7 | 8 | 72 | 45 | +27 | 73 | Qualification for the Conference League second qualifying round | | | | 2–1 | 2–1 | 1–1 | 5–0 | |
| 4 | Železničar | 37 | 16 | 11 | 10 | 50 | 37 | +13 | 59 | Qualification for the Conference League second qualifying round | 2–2 | | | | | 2–0 | 1–1 | 0–0 |
| 5 | Novi Pazar | 37 | 14 | 10 | 13 | 46 | 54 | −8 | 52 | | | | | 2–2 | | 1–5 | | 2–2 |

Updated to match(es) played on 23 May 2026. Source: (in Serbian)
Legend: Blue = home team win; Yellow = draw; Red = away team win.
Rules for classification: 1) Points; 2) Points in regular season; 3) Head-to-head points in regular season; 4) Head-to-head goal difference in regular season; 5) Head-to-head goals scored in regular season; 6) Head-to-head away goals scored in regular season (if two teams tied); 7) Goal difference; 8) Goals scored; 9) Fair play ranking; 10) Drawing of lots.
(C) Champions

===== Results by matchday =====
| Round | 1 | 2 | 3 | 4 | 5 | 6 | 7 |
|---|---|---|---|---|---|---|---|
| Ground | H | A | A | H | H | A | H |
| Result | W | D | L | W | D | D | W |
| Position | 2 | 2 | 2 | 2 | 3 | 3 | 3 |

Updated to match(es) played on 23 May 2026. Source: Partizan
A = Away; H = Home; W = Win; D = Draw; L = Loss

| 18 April 2026 31 | Partizan | 2–1 | Železničar Pančevo | Belgrade |
| 18:30 | Ugrešić 30'; Mitrović (yellow card) 37'; Dragojević (yellow card) 48'; A. Kostić 50'; Roganović (yellow card) 66' | Report | Jovanović 22'; Vidojević (yellow card) 53'; Lhernault (yellow card) 85' | Stadium: Partizan Stadium; Attendance: 1,800; Referee: (Serbia) Aleksandar Živković |

| 22 April 2026 32 | Vojvodina | 0–0 | Partizan | Novi Sad |
| 17:00 | Barros (yellow card) 38'; Veličković (yellow card) 54'; Sukačev (yellow card) 55'; Petrović (yellow card) 71' | Report | Milić (yellow card) 52'; Veličković (yellow card) 56' (yellow-red card) 79'; Natcho (yellow card) 87'; Vukotić (yellow card) 90+3' | Stadium: Karađorđe Stadium; Attendance: 4,500; Referee: (Serbia) Nenad Minaković |

| 26 April 2026 33 | Red Star Belgrade | 3–0 | Partizan | Belgrade |
| 18:00 | Eraković 18' (yellow card) 38'; Avdić 68' (yellow card) 36'; Elšnik (yellow card) 84'; Young-woo 87' | Report | Dragojević (yellow card) 16'; Milošević (yellow card) 79'; Seck (yellow card) 82' | Stadium: Red Star Stadium; Attendance: 23,000; Referee: (Serbia) Miloš Milanović |

| 2 May 2026 34 | Partizan | 2–1 | Novi Pazar | Belgrade |
| 18:30 | Mitrović (yellow card) 17'; Dragojević 23'; Ugrešić 45'; Polter (yellow card) 58'; A. Kostić (yellow card) 90+1' | Report | Miletić (yellow card) 9'; Hadžimujović 78' | Stadium: Partizan Stadium; Attendance: 2,300; Referee: (Serbia) Lazar Lukić |

| 9 May 2026 35 | Partizan | 1–1 | OFK Beograd | Belgrade |
| 19:30 | Vukotić 7'; Dragojević (yellow card) 56'; Đurđević (yellow card) 76'; Seck (yellow card) 86'; Natcho (yellow card) 90+4' | Report | Cvetković 25' (pen.) (yellow card) 79'; Stojanović (yellow card) 16'; Silue (yellow card) 56' | Stadium: Partizan Stadium; Attendance: 2,000; Referee: (Serbia) Milan Stefanović |

| 17 May 2026 36 | Čukarički | 0–0 | Partizan | Belgrade |
| 16:00 | Radosavljević (yellow card) 13'; Đorđević (yellow card) 22'; Jovančić (yellow card) 70'; Cissé (yellow card) 90' | Report | Milovanović (yellow card) 19'; Milić (yellow card) 90' | Stadium: Čukarički Stadium; Attendance: 1,000; Referee: (Serbia) Stanko Ostraćanin |

| 23 May 2026 37 | Partizan | 5–0 | Radnik Surdulica | Belgrade |
| 15:00 | Natcho 23'; Trémoulet 44' (o.g.); Trifunović 49', 75'; Đurđević 89' | Report | Trémoulet (yellow card) 40'; Stevanović (yellow card) 54' | Stadium: Partizan Stadium; Referee: (Serbia) Marko Ivković |

=== Serbian Cup ===
| 28 Оctober 2025 Round of 32 | Mačva Šabac | 2–0 | Partizan | Šabac |
| 18:30 | Ergelaš 16'; Gemović (yellow card) 22'; Gvozdenović (yellow card) 58'; Stevanović (yellow card) 60'; Nikolić 65' (yellow card) 77'; Savić (yellow card) 69'; Abdullahi (yellow card) 78'; Ilić (yellow card) 88'; Rakić (yellow card) 89'; Denić (yellow card) 90+6' | Report | Simić (yellow card) 63' | Stadium: FK Mačva Stadium; Attendance: 4,000; Referee: (Serbia) Milan Stefanović |

=== UEFA Europa League ===
==== First qualifying round ====
| 10 July 2025 First leg | AEK Larnaca (Cyprus) | 1–0 | (Serbia) Partizan | Larnaca, Cyprus |
| 18:30 | Cabrera 67'; Pons (yellow card) 78' | Report | Đurđević (yellow card) 20'; Simić (yellow card) 90+7' | Stadium: AEK Arena; Attendance: 4,127; Referee: (Denmark) Jacob Karlsen |

| 17 July 2025 Second leg | Partizan (Serbia) | 2–1 (2–2 agg.) (5−6 p) | (Cyprus) AEK Larnaca | Belgrade, Serbia |
| 21:00 | J. Milošević (yellow card) 14'; Ugrešić 69'; Milovanović (yellow card) 83'; D. Jovanović 118'; A. Kostić (yellow card) 120'; Dragojević (red card); M. Milošević (red card) | Report | Roberge (yellow card) 37'; Chacón (yellow card) 62'; M. Milošević 104' (o.g.); Ivanović (red card); Gnali (red card) | Stadium: Partizan Stadium; Attendance: 23,253; Referee: (Portugal) Gustavo Correia |
| | Penalties |
| | Natcho (penalty scored); Milovanović (penalty scored); Roganović (penalty missed); Kalulu (penalty missed); Karabelyov (penalty scored); A. Kostić (penalty scored); D, Jovanović (penalty scored); B. Kostić (penalty missed) | | Miličević (penalty missed); Ledes (penalty scored); Suárez (penalty scored); Chacón (penalty missed); Ivanović (penalty scored); Pons (penalty scored); Miramón (penalty scored); Gnali (penalty scored) |

=== UEFA Conference League ===
==== Second qualifying round ====
| 24 July 2025 First leg | Oleksandriya (Ukraine) | 0–2 | (Serbia) Partizan | Katowice, Poland |
| 19:00 | Shostak (yellow card) 45+4'; Vashchenko (yellow card) 71' | Report | B. Kostić 14'; Ugrešić 56' | Stadium: GKS Katowice Stadium; Attendance: 890; Referee: (Estonia) Joonas Jaanovits |

| 31 July 2025 Second leg | Partizan (Serbia) | 4–0 (6–0 agg.) | (Ukraine) Oleksandriya | Belgrade, Serbia |
| 21:00 | J. Milošević 13', 23', 45'; Trifunović (yellow card) 41'; Stojković (yellow card) 45+3' (yellow-red card) 60'; Dragojević (yellow card) 54'; Vukotić 63' | Report | Behiratche (red card) 11'; Ndicka (yellow card) 13' (yellow-red card) 58'; Alvina (yellow card) 45+3'; Skorko (yellow card) 46'; Kulakov (yellow card) 85' | Stadium: Partizan Stadium; Attendance: 27,775; Referee: (Armenia) Henrik Nalbandyan |

==== Third qualifying round ====
| 7 August 2025 First leg | Partizan (Serbia) | 0–2 | (Scotland) Hibernian | Belgrade, Serbia |
| 21:00 | Đurđević (yellow card) 29' (yellow-red card) 34'; Simić (yellow card) 58'; Roganović (yellow card) 73' | Report | Mulligan (yellow card) 22'; Boyle 40', 70' (pen.); Hoilett (yellow card) 90' | Stadium: Partizan Stadium; Attendance: 26,342; Referee: (Malta) Philip Farrugia |

| 14 August 2025 Second leg | Hibernian (Scotland) | 2–3 (4–3 agg.) | (Serbia) Partizan | Edinburgh, Scotland |
| 21:00 | Campbell (yellow card) 47'; Bowie 60'; Obita (yellow card) 67'; Cadden 100'; Iredale (yellow card) 114' | Report | Vukotić 17'; Ugrešić (yellow card) 22'; J. Milošević 44'; Simić (yellow card) 45+2' (yellow-red card) 63' A. Kostić 90+6' | Stadium: Easter Road; Attendance: 19,377; Referee: (Bulgaria) Radoslav Gidzhenov |

== Statistics ==
=== Squad statistics ===
| No. | Pos | Nat | Player | Total | | SuperLiga | | Cup | | Europe | |
| No. | Pos | Nat | Player | Apps | Goals | Apps | Goals | Apps | Goals | Apps | Goals |
Goalkeepers
| 1 | GK | (Serbia) SRB | Marko Milošević | 39 | 0 | 34 | 0 | 0 | 0 | 5 | 0 |
| 31 | GK | (Serbia) SRB | Miloš Krunić | 5 | 0 | 3 | 0 | 1 | 0 | 1 | 0 |
| 41 | GK | (Bosnia and Herzegovina) BIH | Tarik Banjić | 0 | 0 | 0 | 0 | 0 | 0 | 0 | 0 |
Defenders
| 2 | DF | (Serbia) SRB | Aranđel Stojković | 19 | 1 | 16 | 1 | 1 | 0 | 2 | 0 |
| 4 | DF | (Slovenia) SLO | Mario Jurčević | 14 | 1 | 9 | 1 | 0 | 0 | 5 | 0 |
| 5 | DF | (Serbia) SRB | Mateja Milovanović | 14 | 0 | 12 | 0 | 0 | 0 | 2 | 0 |
| 13 | DF | (Nigeria) NGR | Abdulmalik Mohammed | 2 | 0 | 2 | 0 | 0 | 0 | 0 | 0 |
| 23 | DF | (Serbia) SRB | Stefan Mitrović | 15 | 0 | 15 | 0 | 0 | 0 | 0 | 0 |
| 24 | DF | (Serbia) SRB | Vukašin Đurđević | 31 | 3 | 25 | 3 | 1 | 0 | 5 | 0 |
| 30 | DF | (Montenegro) MNE | Milan Roganović | 40 | 0 | 33 | 0 | 1 | 0 | 6 | 0 |
| 33 | DF | (Serbia) SRB | Stefan Petrović | 9 | 0 | 9 | 0 | 0 | 0 | 0 | 0 |
| 40 | DF | (Serbia) SRB | Nikola Simić | 38 | 1 | 32 | 1 | 1 | 0 | 5 | 0 |
| 44 | DF | (Montenegro) MNE | Stefan Milić | 34 | 0 | 31 | 0 | 0 | 0 | 3 | 0 |
| 50 | DF | (Serbia) SRB | Milan Lazarević | 0 | 0 | 0 | 0 | 0 | 0 | 0 | 0 |
Midfielders
| 6 | MF | (Serbia) SRB | Vanja Dragojević | 41 | 4 | 35 | 4 | 1 | 0 | 5 | 0 |
| 10 | MF | (Israel) ISR | Bibars Natcho | 38 | 6 | 32 | 6 | 1 | 0 | 5 | 0 |
| 11 | MF | (Montenegro) MNE | Milan Vukotić | 42 | 8 | 35 | 6 | 1 | 0 | 6 | 2 |
| 14 | MF | (Serbia) SRB | Saša Zdjelar | 13 | 0 | 13 | 0 | 0 | 0 | 0 | 0 |
| 29 | MF | (Norway) NOR | Ghayas Zahid | 12 | 0 | 11 | 0 | 1 | 0 | 0 | 0 |
| 36 | MF | (Serbia) SRB | Ognjen Ugrešić | 44 | 8 | 37 | 6 | 1 | 0 | 6 | 2 |
| 70 | MF | (Serbia) SRB | Dimitrije Janković | 11 | 0 | 9 | 0 | 0 | 0 | 2 | 0 |
Forwards
| 9 | FW | (Montenegro) MNE | Andrej Kostić | 42 | 12 | 35 | 11 | 1 | 0 | 6 | 1 |
| 19 | FW | (Senegal) SEN | Demba Seck | 40 | 6 | 35 | 6 | 1 | 0 | 4 | 0 |
| 32 | FW | (Serbia) SRB | Nemanja Trifunović | 31 | 5 | 25 | 5 | 0 | 0 | 6 | 0 |
| 42 | FW | (Serbia) SRB | Matija Ninić | 2 | 0 | 2 | 0 | 0 | 0 | 0 | 0 |
| 46 | FW | (Serbia) SRB | Marko Lekić | 2 | 0 | 2 | 0 | 0 | 0 | 0 | 0 |
| 77 | FW | (Serbia) SRB | Ivan Martinović | 0 | 0 | 0 | 0 | 0 | 0 | 0 | 0 |
| 79 | FW | (Serbia) SRB | Dušan Jovanović | 1 | 0 | 1 | 0 | 0 | 0 | 0 | 0 |
| 91 | FW | (Germany) GER | Sebastian Polter | 17 | 2 | 17 | 2 | 0 | 0 | 0 | 0 |
| 99 | FW | (Serbia) SRB | Bogdan Kostić | 32 | 4 | 25 | 3 | 1 | 0 | 6 | 1 |
Players transferred out during the season
| 7 | FW | (Serbia) SRB | Jovan Milošević | 23 | 16 | 17 | 12 | 0 | 0 | 6 | 4 |
| 15 | FW | (Democratic Republic of the Congo) COD | Aldo Kalulu | 6 | 0 | 2 | 0 | 0 | 0 | 4 | 0 |
| 17 | DF | (Serbia) SRB | Marko Živković | 0 | 0 | 0 | 0 | 0 | 0 | 0 | 0 |
| 20 | MF | (Nigeria) NGR | Samson Nwulu | 0 | 0 | 0 | 0 | 0 | 0 | 0 | 0 |
| 21 | DF | (Serbia) SRB | Ivan Vasiljević | 0 | 0 | 0 | 0 | 0 | 0 | 0 | 0 |
| 28 | MF | (Bulgaria) BUL | Yanis Karabelyov | 27 | 2 | 20 | 2 | 1 | 0 | 6 | 0 |
| 39 | FW | (Ghana) GHA | Ibrahim Zubairu | 8 | 1 | 7 | 1 | 1 | 0 | 0 | 0 |
| 42 | FW | (Serbia) SRB | Dušan Jovanović | 7 | 1 | 4 | 0 | 1 | 0 | 2 | 1 |
| 88 | GK | (Serbia) SRB | Vukašin Jovanović | 0 | 0 | 0 | 0 | 0 | 0 | 0 | 0 |
| 90 | MF | (Serbia) SRB | Zoran Alilović | 0 | 0 | 0 | 0 | 0 | 0 | 0 | 0 |

Last updated: 23 May 2026
Source: Competitions

=== Goal scorers ===
| Rank | No. | Pos | Nat | Name | SuperLiga | Serbian Cup | Europe | Total |
|---|---|---|---|---|---|---|---|---|
| 1 | 7 | FW | (Serbia) | Jovan Milošević | 12 | 0 | 4 | 16 |
| 2 | 9 | FW | (Montenegro) | Andrej Kostić | 11 | 0 | 1 | 12 |
| 3 | 36 | MF | (Serbia) | Ognjen Ugrešić | 6 | 0 | 2 | 8 |
| 3 | 11 | MF | (Montenegro) | Milan Vukotić | 6 | 0 | 2 | 8 |
| 4 | 19 | FW | (Senegal) | Demba Seck | 6 | 0 | 0 | 6 |
| 4 | 10 | MF | (Israel) | Bibars Natcho | 6 | 0 | 0 | 6 |
| 5 | 32 | FW | (Serbia) | Nemanja Trifunović | 5 | 0 | 0 | 5 |
| 6 | 99 | FW | (Serbia) | Bogdan Kostić | 3 | 0 | 1 | 4 |
| 6 | 6 | MF | (Serbia) | Vanja Dragojević | 4 | 0 | 0 | 4 |
| 7 | 24 | DF | (Serbia) | Vukašin Đurđević | 3 | 0 | 0 | 3 |
| 8 | 28 | MF | (Bulgaria) | Yanis Karabelyov | 2 | 0 | 0 | 2 |
| 8 | 91 | FW | (Germany) | Sebastian Polter | 2 | 0 | 0 | 2 |
| 8 | | | | Own goal | 2 | 0 | 0 | 2 |
| 9 | 42 | FW | (Serbia) | Dušan Jovanović | 0 | 0 | 1 | 1 |
| 9 | 2 | DF | (Serbia) | Aranđel Stojković | 1 | 0 | 0 | 1 |
| 9 | 4 | DF | (Slovenia) | Mario Jurčević | 1 | 0 | 0 | 1 |
| 9 | 40 | DF | (Serbia) | Nikola Simić | 1 | 0 | 0 | 1 |
| 9 | 39 | FW | (Ghana) | Ibrahim Zubairu | 1 | 0 | 0 | 1 |
| Totals | | | | | 72 | 0 | 11 | 83 |

Last updated: 23 May 2026

=== Disciplinary record ===
| Number | Nation | Position | Name | SuperLiga | | Serbian Cup | | Europe | | Total | |
| Number | Nation | Position | Name | Yellow card | Red card | Yellow card | Red card | Yellow card | Red card | Yellow card | Red card |
| 1 | (Serbia) | GK | Marko Milošević | 1 | 0 | 0 | 0 | 0 | 1 | 1 | 1 |
| 2 | (Serbia) | DF | Aranđel Stojković | 2 | 0 | 0 | 0 | 2 | 1 | 4 | 1 |
| 5 | (Serbia) | DF | Mateja Milovanović | 1 | 0 | 0 | 0 | 1 | 0 | 2 | 0 |
| 6 | (Serbia) | MF | Vanja Dragojević | 6 | 0 | 0 | 0 | 1 | 1 | 7 | 1 |
| 7 | (Serbia) | FW | Jovan Milošević | 1 | 0 | 0 | 0 | 1 | 0 | 2 | 0 |
| 9 | (Montenegro) | FW | Andrej Kostić | 3 | 0 | 0 | 0 | 1 | 0 | 4 | 0 |
| 10 | (Israel) | MF | Bibars Natcho | 2 | 0 | 0 | 0 | 0 | 0 | 2 | 0 |
| 11 | (Montenegro) | MF | Milan Vukotić | 2 | 0 | 0 | 0 | 0 | 0 | 2 | 0 |
| 14 | (Serbia) | MF | Saša Zdjelar | 2 | 0 | 0 | 0 | 0 | 0 | 2 | 0 |
| 19 | (Senegal) | FW | Demba Seck | 6 | 0 | 0 | 0 | 0 | 0 | 6 | 0 |
| 23 | (Serbia) | DF | Stefan Mitrović | 2 | 0 | 0 | 0 | 0 | 0 | 2 | 0 |
| 24 | (Serbia) | DF | Vukašin Đurđević | 5 | 1 | 0 | 0 | 3 | 1 | 8 | 2 |
| 28 | (Bulgaria) | MF | Yanis Karabelyov | 3 | 0 | 0 | 0 | 0 | 0 | 3 | 0 |
| 30 | (Montenegro) | DF | Milan Roganović | 5 | 0 | 0 | 0 | 1 | 0 | 6 | 0 |
| 32 | (Serbia) | FW | Nemanja Trifunović | 3 | 0 | 0 | 0 | 1 | 0 | 4 | 0 |
| 33 | (Serbia) | DF | Stefan Petrović | 1 | 0 | 0 | 0 | 0 | 0 | 1 | 0 |
| 36 | (Serbia) | MF | Ognjen Ugrešić | 3 | 0 | 0 | 0 | 1 | 0 | 4 | 0 |
| 39 | (Ghana) | FW | Ibrahim Zubairu | 1 | 0 | 0 | 0 | 0 | 0 | 1 | 0 |
| 40 | (Serbia) | DF | Nikola Simić | 1 | 0 | 1 | 0 | 4 | 1 | 6 | 1 |
| 42 | (Serbia) | FW | Dušan Jovanović | 1 | 0 | 0 | 0 | 0 | 0 | 1 | 0 |
| 44 | (Montenegro) | DF | Stefan Milić | 9 | 0 | 0 | 0 | 0 | 0 | 9 | 0 |
| 91 | (Germany) | FW | Sebastian Polter | 1 | 0 | 0 | 0 | 0 | 0 | 1 | 0 |
| 99 | (Serbia) | FW | Bogdan Kostić | 1 | 0 | 0 | 0 | 0 | 0 | 1 | 0 |
| | | | TOTALS | 62 | 1 | 1 | 0 | 16 | 5 | 79 | 6 |

Last updated: 17 May 2026

=== Clean sheets ===
| Rank | No. | Pos | Nat | Name | SuperLiga | Serbian Cup | Europe | Total |
|---|---|---|---|---|---|---|---|---|
| 1 | 1 | GK | (Serbia) | Marko Milošević | 12 | 0 | 1 | 13 |
| 2 | 31 | GK | (Serbia) | Miloš Krunić | 1 | 0 | 1 | 2 |
| Totals | | | | | 13 | 0 | 2 | 15 |

Last updated: 23 May 2026

=== Games as captain ===
| Rank | No. | Pos | Nat | Name | SuperLiga | Serbian Cup | Europe | Total |
|---|---|---|---|---|---|---|---|---|
| 1 | 6 | MF | (Serbia) | Vanja Dragojević | 30 | 0 | 4 | 34 |
| 2 | 10 | MF | (Israel) | Bibars Natcho | 4 | 1 | 1 | 6 |
| 3 | 36 | MF | (Serbia) | Ognjen Ugrešić | 2 | 0 | 1 | 3 |
| 4 | 14 | MF | (Serbia) | Saša Zdjelar | 1 | 0 | 0 | 1 |
| Totals | | | | | 37 | 1 | 6 | 44 |

Last updated: 23 May 2026
