= Milan Roganović =

Montenegrin footballer (born 2005)

Personal information
- Date of birth: 28 October 2005 (age 21)
- Place of birth: Podgorica, Serbia and Montenegro
- Height: 1.82 m (6 ft 0 in)
- Position: Right-back

Team information
- Current team: Genk
- Number: 25

Youth career
- –2022: Zeta
- 2023–2024: Partizan

Senior career*
Years	Team	Apps	(Gls)
2021–2022	Zeta	21	(0)
2023–2026	Partizan	56	(0)
2026–	Genk	3	(0)

International career^{‡}
2019	Montenegro U15	2	(0)
2019–2020	Montenegro U16	5	(0)
2021–	Montenegro U17	6	(1)
2022–2024	Montenegro U19	16	(0)
2024–	Montenegro U21	3	(0)
2025–	Montenegro	10	(0)
- * Club domestic league appearances and goals as of 10 November 2026 ‡ National team caps and goals as of 5 October 2026

Milan Roganović (Cyrillic: Милан Рогановић; born 28 October 2005) is a Montenegrin professional footballer who plays as a right-back for Belgian club Genk and the Montenegro national team.

== Career ==
Roganović made his debut for the senior team of Zeta at the age of sixteen. During the 2021/22 season, he played 21 matches in the Montenegrin First League.

In 2023, Roganović moved to the youth team of Partizan, with whom he initially signed a three-year contract. He made his first professional appearance for that club in the last round of the Serbian Super League for the 2023/24 season, replacing Aranđel Stojković in the 74th minute. Although Roganović developed as a midfielder in his younger years, he established himself as a right-back among the Partizan first team. After an injury and one period spent in Teleoptik, Roganović was given the opportunity to perform continuously from the beginning of 2025.

Roganović played for the Montenegrin national teams ranging from U15 to U21 levels. On 5 September 2025, he debuted for the senior team in a 2026 FIFA World Cup qualification against the Czech Republic, where Montenegro lost 2–0.

== Career statistics ==
=== Club ===
As of match played 10 November 2026

Appearances and goals by club, season and competition
Club	Season	League			National cup		Continental		Other		Total	
Club	Season	Division	Apps	Goals	Apps	Goals	Apps	Goals	Apps	Goals	Apps	Goals
Zeta	2021–22	Montenegrin First League	21	0	—		—		—		21	0
Partizan	2023–24	Serbian SuperLiga	1	0	—		—		—		1	0
Partizan	2024–25	Serbian SuperLiga	17	0	1	0	—		—		18	0
Partizan	2025–26	Serbian SuperLiga	27	0	1	0	6 (Note: Two appearances in UEFA Europa League, four appearances in UEFA Conference League)	0	—		34	0
Partizan	2026–27	Serbian SuperLiga	5	0	0	0	5 (Note: Appearances in UEFA Conference League)	0	—		10	0
Partizan	Total		50	0	2	0	11	0	—		63	0
Genk	2026–27	Belgian Pro League	3	0	1	0	—		—		4	0
Career total			79	0	3	0	11	0	0	0	93	0

=== International ===
As of match played 5 October 2026

Appearances and goals by national team and year
National team	Year	Apps	Goals
Montenegro	2025	3	0
Montenegro	2026	7	0
Total		10	0
