= Andrej Kostić =

Montenegrin footballer born 2007

Andrej Kostić Андреј Костић
Personal information
- Full name: Andrej Kostić
- Date of birth: 16 January 2007 (age 19)
- Place of birth: Podgorica, Montenegro
- Height: 1.88 m (6 ft 2 in)
- Positions: Striker; left winger

Team information
- Current team: Sparta Rotterdam (on loan from AC Milan)

Youth career
- Budućnost

Senior career*
Years	Team	Apps	(Gls)
2023–2025	Budućnost	22	(4)
2025–2026	Partizan	35	(11)
2026–	AC Milan	0	(0)
2026–	→ Sparta Rotterdam (loan)	7	(1)

International career^{‡}
2023	Montenegro U17	3	(1)
2024–2025	Montenegro U19	14	(2)
2025–	Montenegro U21	4	(1)
2025–	Montenegro	4	(0)
- * Club domestic league appearances and goals as of 10 November 2026 ‡ National team caps and goals as of 13 November 2026

Andrej Kostić (Serbian Cyrillic: Андреј Костић; born 16 January 2007) is a Montenegrin professional footballer who plays as a striker and left winger for Eredivisie club Sparta Rotterdam, on loan from Serie A club AC Milan (as well as the reserve team Serie D club Milan Futuro). He also plays for the Montenegro national team.

== Club career ==
=== Budućnost ===
Kostić came through the youth system of Budućnost. He was promoted to the senior squad in the 2023–24 season, receiving the number 23 jersey. On 10 December 2023, Kostić remained an unused substitute in a 3–1 away league win over Mladost Donja Gorica. He made his competitive debut on 10 March 2024, coming on as a second-half substitute for Petar Grbić in a 6–0 league victory against Arsenal Tivat. On 27 March 2024, Kostić signed his first professional contract with the club until January 2027. He helped the side win the championship title in the 2024–25 season, contributing with four goals in 20 appearances.

=== Partizan ===
On 24 June 2025, Kostić completed his move to Serbian club Partizan, penning a five-year contract. He was assigned the number 9 shirt ahead of the 2025–26 season. On 20 July 2025, Kostić made his league debut by replacing Jovan Milošević in the 63rd minute and scoring a late injury-time goal to seal a 1–0 away win over Železničar Pančevo. He subsequently netted a brace after coming off the bench in a 7–2 away league victory against Napredak Kruševac on 10 August 2025.

=== AC Milan ===
Kostić and his breakthrough with Partizan had been closely monitored by the scouts of Italian club AC Milan since late 2025, with reports of a possible move after the 2025–26 season. On 31 March 2026, Kostić was announced as AC Milan's first signing ahead of the upcoming 2026–27 season, set to first join the club's Milan Futuro reserve team, with eligibility to play for the first team as well. The move caused some controversy with a public reaction from Partizan's vice president Predrag Mijatović who expressed frustration at the negotiations having been held without his knowledge and the transfer's eventual fee, believing it should have been much higher.

He was one of the 26 players called-up with the senior squad by head coach Ruben Amorim on 12 July 2026, for pre-season ahead of the 2026–27 season.

==== Loan to Sparta Rotterdam ====
On 19 August 2026, Kostić joined Dutch Eredivisie club Sparta Rotterdam, on loan for the 2026–27 season.

== International career ==
Kostić holds dual Montenegrin and Serbian citizenship. At international level, he helped Montenegro earn a spot in the 2025 UEFA European Under-19 Championship.

== Career statistics ==
=== Club ===
As of match played 10 November 2026

Appearances and goals by club, season and competition
Club	Season	League			National cup (Note: Includes Montenegrin Cup, Serbian Cup)		Continental		Total	
Club	Season	Division	Apps	Goals	Apps	Goals	Apps	Goals	Apps	Goals
Budućnost	2023–24	Montenegrin First League	2	0	0	0	0	0	2	0
Budućnost	2024–25	Montenegrin First League	20	4	1	1	1 (Note: Appearances in UEFA Conference League)	0	22	5
Budućnost	Total		22	4	1	1	1	0	24	5
Partizan	2025–26	Serbian SuperLiga	35	11	1	0	6 (Note: Two appearances in UEFA Europa League, four appearances and one goal in UEFA Conference League)	1	42	12
Partizan	Total		35	11	1	0	6	1	42	12
AC Milan	2026–27	Serie A	0	0	0	0	0	0	0	0
AC Milan	Total		0	0	0	0	0	0	0	0
Sparta Rotterdam (loan)	2026–27	Eredivisie	7	1	1	0	—		8	1
Sparta Rotterdam (loan)	Total		7	1	1	0	—		8	1
Career total			64	16	3	1	7	1	74	18

=== International ===
As of match played 5 June 2026

Appearances and goals by national team and year
National team	Year	Apps	Goals
Montenegro
Montenegro	2025	2	0
Montenegro	2026	2	0
Total		4	0

== Honours ==
Budućnost Podgorica

- Montenegrin First League: 2024–25
