= Bogdan Kostić =

Serbian footballer

Personal information
- Full name: Bogdan Kostić
- Date of birth: 17 January 2007 (age 19)
- Place of birth: Čačak, Serbia
- Height: 1.75 m (5 ft 9 in)
- Position: Forward

Team information
- Current team: Partizan
- Number: 99

Youth career
- Gaučosi Čačak
- Kiker Kraljevo
- Borac Čačak
- Partizan

Senior career*
Years	Team	Apps	(Gls)
2025–	Partizan	38	(4)

International career^{‡}
2023–2024	Serbia U17	15	(8)
2025–	Serbia U19	11	(2)
- * Club domestic league appearances and goals as of 22 November 2026 ‡ National team caps and goals as of 2 July 2026

Bogdan Kostić (Serbian Cyrillic: Богдан Костић; born 17 January 2007) is a Serbian professional footballer who plays as a forward for Partizan.

== Club career ==
In October 2024, Kostić signed his first professional contract with Partizan, penning a three-year deal. He made his official debut for the club on 10 July 2025, coming on as a late second-half substitute for Nemanja Trifunović in a 1–0 away loss to AEK Larnaca in the first leg of the UEFA Europa League first qualifying round. On 24 July 2025, Kostić scored his first goal for Partizan, opening the scoring in a 2–0 away win over Oleksandriya in the first leg of the UEFA Conference League second qualifying round.

== International career ==
In May 2024, Kostić was selected to represent Serbia at the 2024 UEFA European Under-17 Championship. He scored one goal in the tournament, helping the team reach the semi-finals.

== Personal life ==
Kostić is the son of fellow footballer Zoran Kostić.

== Career statistics ==
As of 22 November 2026

Appearances and goals by club, season and competition
Club	Season	League			Cup		Continental		Total	
Club	Season	Division	Apps	Goals	Apps	Goals	Apps	Goals	Apps	Goals
Partizan	2025–26	Serbian SuperLiga	25	3	1	0	6 (Note: Two appearances in UEFA Europa League, four appearances and one goal in UEFA Conference League)	1	32	4
Partizan	2026–27	Serbian SuperLiga	13	1	1	0	5	1	19	2
Career total			38	4	2	0	11	2	51	6

== Honours ==
Individual

- Serbian SuperLiga Player of the Week: 2025–26 (Round 4),
