= Vukašin Đurđević =

Serbian footballer (born 2004)

Personal information
- Full name: Vukašin Đurđević
- Date of birth: 24 January 2004 (age 22)
- Place of birth: Belgrade, Serbia and Montenegro
- Height: 1.84 m (6 ft 0 in)
- Position: Defender

Team information
- Current team: Partizan
- Number: 24

Youth career
- 2015–2022: Rad

Senior career*
Years	Team	Apps	(Gls)
2021–2022	Rad	30	(0)
2023–2024	Voždovac	34	(2)
2024–	Partizan	43	(3)

International career^{‡}
2022–2023	Serbia U19	3	(1)
2024–	Serbia U21	4	(1)
2026–	Serbia	2	(0)
- * Club domestic league appearances and goals as of 22 November 2026 ‡ National team caps and goals as of 5 June 2026

Vukašin Đurđević (Serbian Cyrillic: Вукашин Ђурђевић; born 24 January 2004) is a Serbian professional footballer who plays as a defender for Partizan.

== Club career ==
Đurđević started playing football in Mladenovac, and later passed all categories of FK Rad. He signed his first professional contract in April 2021. Đurđević collected 30 Serbian First League appearances until the end of 2022 and moved to Voždovac in January 2023. He scored in his Serbian Superliga debut, against Radnički Niš on 12 March 2023.

== Career statistics ==
As of 22 November 2026

Appearances and goals by club, season and competition
Club	Season	League			National cup		Continental		Other		Total	
Club	Season	Division	Apps	Goals	Apps	Goals	Apps	Goals	Apps	Goals	Apps	Goals
Rad	2021–22	Serbian First League	20	0	2	0	—		—		22	0
Rad	2022–23	Serbian First League	10	0	1	0	—		—		11	0
Rad	Total		30	0	3	0	—		—		33	0
Voždovac	2022–23	Serbian SuperLiga	1	1	—		—		—		1	1
Voždovac	2023–24	Serbian SuperLiga	33	1	3	0	—		—		36	1
Voždovac	Total		34	2	3	0	—		—		37	2
Partizan	2024–25	Serbian SuperLiga	12	0	0	0	0	0	—		12	0
Partizan	2025–26	Serbian SuperLiga	25	3	1	0	5	0	—		31	3
Partizan	2026–27	Serbian SuperLiga	6	0	1	0	4	0	—		11	0
Partizan	Total		43	3	2	0	9	0	—		54	3
Career total			107	5	8	0	9	0	0	0	124	5
