= Vanja Dragojević =

Serbian footballer (born 2006)

Personal information
- Full name: Vanja Dragojević
- Date of birth: 11 January 2006 (age 20)
- Place of birth: Zemun, Serbia and Montenegro
- Height: 1.84 m (6 ft 0 in)
- Position: Defensive midfielder

Team information
- Current team: Rangers
- Number: 22

Youth career
- Altina Zemun
- 2021–2024: Partizan

Senior career*
Years	Team	Apps	(Gls)
2024–2026	Partizan	44	(4)
2024–2025	→ Teleoptik (loan)	12	(2)
2026–	Rangers	2	(0)

International career^{‡}
2025–	Serbia U21	4	(0)
2026–	Serbia	3	(0)
- * Club domestic league appearances and goals as of 10 November 2026 ‡ National team caps and goals as of 17 November 2026

Vanja Dragojević (Serbian Cyrillic: Вања Драгојевић; born 11 January 2006) is a Serbian professional footballer who plays as a defensive midfielder for Scottish Premiership club Rangers and the Serbia national team.

== Club career ==
Dragojević began training at the "FK Altina" football school in Zemun, where Dušan Vlahović also took his first steps in football. Dragojević later went through all the junior levels of Partizan, and also played for the club in the UEFA Youth League. He signed his first professional contract in September 2023, when he was presented to the public with peers including goalkeeper Vanja Radulaški and Ognjen Ugrešić and Zoran Alilović, also midfielders. During the summer of 2024, after playing for the youth team, Dragojević was immediately transferred to Teleoptik, for whom he played his first senior matches in the Serbian League Belgrade. He made 12 appearances and scored 2 goals in that competition, before the sports department decided to terminate his loan.

Dragojević made his debut for the first team in the round of 16 of the Serbian Cup away against Radnik Surdulica, replacing Mihajlo Ilić in the 83rd minute. Ten days later, he played, paired with Aleksandar Filipović in the centre-back positions, against CSKA Moscow in a friendly match. In the following period, he also established himself in the Serbian SuperLiga, and at the end of the 2024/25 season. he appeared as a regular as one of the bonus players. He played the entire match against Red Star Belgrade at the Rajko Mitić Stadium as part of the 176th eternal derby. He ended his first season in professional competition with an assist for Milan Vukotić in a win over Vojvodina in the final round. After that, he officially extended his contract with Partizan until 2030. A release clause of 15 million euros was added to the contract. Following the departure of Aleksandar Jovanović, Bibars Natcho was elected as the new captain of Partizan, and Dragojević as the vice captain. He wore the armband in a friendly match against Radnički Niš on the first day of summer 2025. Dragojević scored his first goal for Partizan in the 10th round of the Serbian SuperLiga, against OFK Beograd at the Kraljevica Stadium in Zaječar, when, after a possession and a solo run, he hit the net guarded by Balša Popović.

On 23 July 2026, Dragojevic signed for Scottish club Rangers on a four-year deal with the option of an additional year. On 16 August 2026, Dragojević scored his first goal at the Ibrox Stadium in the Scottish League Cup round of 16 against St Mirren.

== Playing style ==
Standing at 184 centimetres tall, Dragojević primarily plays as a defensive midfielder. Bojan Šaranov, former Partizan goalkeeper and Vanja's agent, described him as a player with a strong character and physical predispositions. Dragojević is characterized by a competitive mentality, impudence and aggressive play, which is why he was often penalized with cards in the younger categories. He has a playing style similar to Kristijan Belić, while he singled out Saša Zdjelar as his footballing role model. Upon his transition to senior football, he was often compared to that player. He was occasionally dropped to the last line, in the position of a defender.

=== International ===
As of 13 November 2026

Appearances and goals by national team and year
National team	Year	Apps	Goals
Serbia	2026	3	0
Total		3	0
