= Mateja Milovanović =

Serbian footballer (born 2004)

Personal information
- Full name: Mateja Milovanović
- Date of birth: 18 April 2004 (age 22)
- Place of birth: Vlaardingen, Netherlands
- Height: 1.87 m (6 ft 2 in)
- Position: Defender

Team information
- Current team: Partizan
- Number: 5

Youth career
- 2008–2018: Sparta
- 2018–2021: Ajax

Senior career*
Years	Team	Apps	(Gls)
2021–2024	Jong Ajax	12	(0)
2024–2025	Heerenveen	2	(0)
2025–	Partizan	20	(0)

International career^{‡}
2021–2023	Serbia U19	7	(0)
- * Club domestic league appearances and goals as of 17:35, 22 November 2026 (UTC) ‡ National team caps and goals as of 23 November 2022

Mateja Milovanović (Serbian Cyrillic: Матеја Миловановић; born 18 April 2004) is a professional footballer who plays as a defender for Serbian SuperLiga club Partizan. Born in the Netherlands, he has represented Serbia at youth level.

== Personal life ==
Milovanović was born in Vlaardingen in 2004. His father Viktor Milovanović was playing for Sparta Rotterdam at the time. Mateja has captained the Netherlands at youth level but has eligibility for Serbia through his family.

== Club career ==
Milovanović signed a first professional contract with Ajax in 2021 to take him through to 2024. He had been with Ajax youth teams since 2018 when he switched from Sparta Rotterdam. He made his professional debut in the Eerste Divisie for Jong Ajax in a 1–0 defeat against Roda JC Kerkrade on 12 August 2022.

On 11 July 2024, Milovanović joined Heerenveen on a two-year deal.

== International career ==
Having previously been called up for the under-15 and under-18 teams of the Netherlands, Milovanović made his debut for the Serbia under-19 team under manager Dejan Branković on 7 June 2021, in a friendly fixture against Romania under-19 which resulted in a 1–0 victory at home.

== Career statistics ==
As of match played 22 November 2026

Appearances and goals by club, season and competition
Club	Season	League			Cup		Europe		Other		Total	
Club	Season	Division	Apps	Goals	Apps	Goals	Apps	Goals	Apps	Goals	Apps	Goals
Jong Ajax	2022–23	Eerste Divisie	12	0	—		—		—		12	0
Heerenveen	2024–25	Eredivisie	2	0	2	0	—		—		4	0
Partizan	2025–26	Serbian SuperLiga	12	0	0	0	2	0	—		14	0
Partizan	2026–27	Serbian SuperLiga	8	0	1	0	1	0	—		10	0
Career total			34	0	3	0	3	0	0	0	40	0

== Style of play ==
According to La Gazzetta dello Sport both AS Roma and S.S.C. Napoli were attracted to Milovanović as he was left footed, tall and strong but with good technique, they felt his style of play was comparable to Matthijs de Ligt.
