= Dušan Jovanović (footballer, born 2006) =

Serbian footballer (born 2006)

Personal information
- Full name: Dušan Jovanović
- Date of birth: 15 February 2006 (age 20)
- Place of birth: Smederevo, Serbia and Montenegro
- Height: 1.84 m (6 ft 0 in)
- Position: Forward

Team information
- Current team: Železničar Pančevo
- Number: 9

Youth career
- Partizan

Senior career*
Years	Team	Apps	(Gls)
2023–2026	Partizan	17	(1)
2026–	Železničar Pančevo	12	(0)

International career^{‡}
2021	Serbia U15	2	(0)
2023–2025	Serbia U18	1	(0)
- * Club domestic league appearances and goals as of 2026-1-30 ‡ National team caps and goals as of 2023-12-12

Dušan Jovanović (Serbian Cyrillic: Душан Јовановић; born 15 February 2006) is a Serbian professional footballer who plays as a forward for Železničar Pančevo.

== Club career ==
Jovanović began his football training in Radinac. He later progressed through the youth ranks of Partizan Belgrade. During the 2023–24 season, he played for the club's youth team in the UEFA Youth League. In mid-October 2023, he signed a three-year contract with his parent club. In early December of the same year, he joined the first team under coach Igor Duljaj. He made his debut in the round of 16 of the Serbian Cup against Grafičar. He entered the match in the 76th minute, with the score 0–1, and three minutes later scored the equalizer, assisted by Aranđel Stojković. A few days later, he made his debut in the Serbian SuperLiga, coming on as a substitute for Kristijan Belić in the 78th minute of a match in the 18th round against Radnički Niš at Čair Stadium.

== International career ==
Jovanović made his debut for the Serbian national under-15 team in May 2021, in a two-leg match against his peers from Bosnia and Herzegovina. In August 2023, he received an invitation from Aleksandar Luković for the under-18 team against his peers from Italy. In that match, he stepped onto the field after one hour of play, and Serbia was defeated by a score of 3–0.
