= Milan Vukotić =

Montenegrin footballer

Personal information
- Date of birth: 5 October 2002 (age 24)
- Place of birth: Podgorica, FR Yugoslavia
- Height: 1.78 m (5 ft 10 in)
- Position: Midfielder

Team information
- Current team: Partizan
- Number: 11

Youth career
- Budućnost Podgorica

Senior career*
Years	Team	Apps	(Gls)
2019–2020	Budućnost Podgorica	1	(0)
2019–2020	→ Iskra Danilovgrad (loan)	22	(2)
2020–2023	Dinamo Zagreb	0	(0)
2020–2022	→ Dinamo Zagreb II	35	(3)
2022	→ Tabor Sežana (loan)	5	(0)
2023	→ Zrinjski Mostar (loan)	4	(0)
2023–2025	Budućnost Podgorica	49	(13)
2025–	Partizan	61	(11)

International career^{‡}
2017–2018	Montenegro U17	4	(0)
2019	Montenegro U19	3	(1)
2020–2024	Montenegro U21	12	(0)
2024–	Montenegro	15	(1)
- * Club domestic league appearances and goals as of 8 November 2026 ‡ National team caps and goals as of 15 November 2026

Milan Vukotić (Montenegrin Cyrillic: Милан Вукотић; born 5 October 2002) is a Montenegrin professional footballer who plays as a midfielder for Serbian club Partizan and the Montenegro national team.

== Club career ==
=== Budućnost Podgorica ===
Vukotić started his career with Budućnost Podgorica.

In 2019, he was loaned to Iskra Danilovgrad.

=== Dinamo Zagreb ===
In 2020, he signed for Dinamo Zagreb.

In July 2022, Vukotić was promoted to the first team of Dinamo Zagreb. Vukotić has not yet appeared in a single game for the team from Zagreb.

=== Loan to Tabor Sežana and Zrinjski Mostar ===
In August 2022, Vukotić was sent on loan until the end of the half-season to the Slovenian Tabor Sežana. In January 2023, it was confirmed that Vukotić was sent on a new loan, this time to a Bosnian club Zrinjski Mostar.

=== Partizan ===
On January 8, 2025, Partizan secured the signature of Milan Vukotić on four and a half years in a transfer worth €450,000. Vukotić was given the number 11 jersey. On February 1, 2025, Vukotić made his debut in the 67th minute, replacing Bibars Natcho in a game against Spartak Subotica. On 22 February, Vukotić made his first appearance in the Eternal derby against Red Star, replacing Stefan Kovač in the 85th minute in a game that ended 3–3. He scored his first goal for the club on March 12, 2025, in a 0–3 victory over Radnik Surdulica in the round of 16 of the Serbian Cup. On May 25, 2025, in the last round of the Serbian SuperLiga, Vukotić scored a goal in a 3–2 win over Vojvodina, assisted by Vanja Dragojević.

== International career ==
Vukotić is a member of the Montenegro national under-21 football team.

== Career statistics ==
=== Club ===
As of match played 8 November 2026

Appearances and goals by club, season and competition
Club	Season	League	League		Cup		Continental		Total	
Club	Season	League	Apps	Goals	Apps	Goals	Apps	Goals	Apps	Goals
Iskra Danilovgrad (loan)	2019–20	Montenegrin First League	22	2	2	0	—		24	2
Budućnost Podgorica	2020–21	Montenegrin First League	1	0	0	0	—		1	0
Dinamo Zagreb II	2020–21	Croatian Second League	16	1	0	0	—		16	1
Dinamo Zagreb II	2021–22	Croatian Second League	19	2	0	0	—		19	2
Dinamo Zagreb II	Total		35	3	0	0	—		35	3
Tabor Sežana (loan)	2022–23	Slovenian First League	5	0	2	0	—		7	0
Zrinjski Mostar (loan)	2022–23	Bosnian Premier League	4	0	2	1	—		6	1
Budućnost Podgorica	2023–24	Montenegrin First League	31	4	4	1	—		35	5
Budućnost Podgorica	2024–25	Montenegrin First League	18	9	0	0	4	0	22	9
Budućnost Podgorica	Total		49	13	4	1	4	0	57	14
Partizan	2024–25	Serbian SuperLiga	16	3	1	1	—		17	4
Partizan	2025–26	Serbian SuperLiga	35	6	1	0	6	2	42	8
Partizan	2026–27	Serbian SuperLiga	10	2	1	0	5	0	16	2
Career total			177	29	13	3	15	2	205	34

=== International ===
As of match played 15 November 2026

Scores and results list Montenegro's goal tally first, score column indicates score after each Vukotić goal.

List of international goals scored by Milan Vukotić
No.	Date	Venue	Cap	Opponent	Score	Result	Competition
1	15 November 2026	Alphamega Stadium Limassol, Cyprus	15	Cyprus	2–1	4–1	2026–27 UEFA Nations League C

== Honours ==
Budućnost Podgorica

- 1.CFL: 2020–21
- Montenegrin Cup: 2023–24
