= Montenegro national football team =

Men's national association football team representing Montenegro

Montenegro
- Nickname: Hrabri sokoli (The Brave Falcons)
- Association: Football Association of Montenegro (FSCG)
- Confederation: UEFA (Europe)
- Head coach: Mirko Vučinić
- Captain: Stevan Jovetić
- Most caps: Stevan Jovetić (96)
- Top scorer: Stevan Jovetić (37)
- Home stadium: Podgorica City Stadium
- FIFA code: MNE
First colours	Second colours

FIFA ranking
- Current: 79 ▲1 (7 October 2026)
- Highest: 16 (June 2011)
- Lowest: 199 (June 2007)

First international
- Montenegro 2–1 Hungary (Podgorica, Montenegro; 24 March 2007)

Biggest win
- San Marino 0–6 Montenegro (Serravalle, San Marino; 11 September 2012)

Biggest defeat
- England 7–0 Montenegro (London, England; 14 November 2019)

The Montenegro national football team (Montenegrin: Fudbalska reprezentacija Crne Gore) has represented Montenegro in men's international football since 2007. It is controlled by the Football Association of Montenegro, the governing body for football in Montenegro. Montenegro's home ground is Podgorica City Stadium in Podgorica.

Montenegro is one of the world's youngest international teams, having joined FIFA and UEFA in 2007 following the 2006 Montenegrin independence referendum. The team played its first official international match against Hungary in March 2007.

== History ==
=== Formation ===
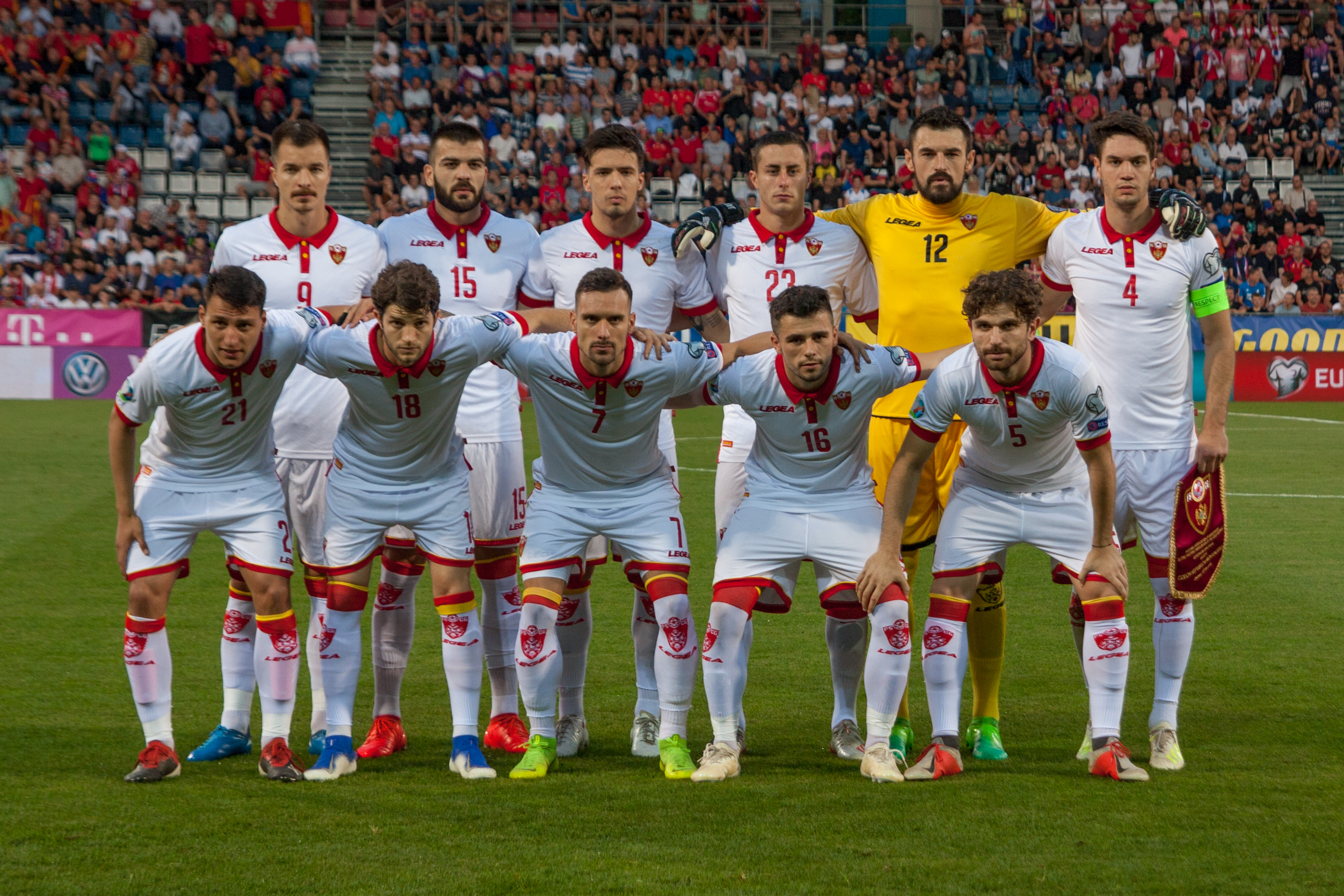
Montenegro national team squad in EURO 2020 qualifiers

Following the independence of Montenegro from Serbia and Montenegro, Serbia was set to represent both Serbia and Montenegro in the Euro 2008 qualifying stage. However, UEFA would include Montenegro as a late entry if FIFA ratified a separate Montenegrin Football Association before September 2006. Moreover, this did not occur before the competition began.

In October 2006, Montenegro was granted provisional membership of UEFA, with a debate regarding full membership scheduled at a full UEFA Congress in January 2007. Montenegro's first FIFA World Ranking was joint 199th place, the last place on the list by default.

=== First matches ===
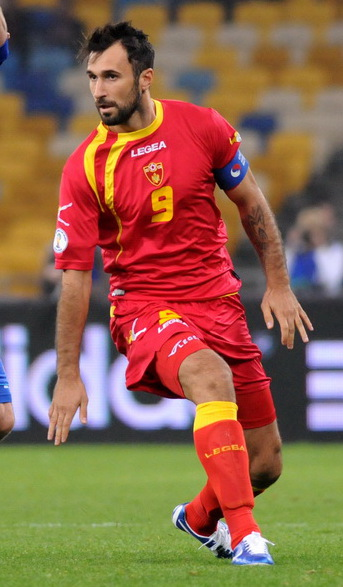
Mirko Vučinić was the first captain of Montenegro

On 26 January 2007, the Montenegro FA was granted full membership of UEFA. The team played its first FIFA-recognized friendly match against Hungary on 24 March 2007 at Stadion Pod Goricom in Podgorica. Montenegro won 2–1 in front of 12,000 spectators. Striker Mirko Vučinić scored the country's first goal in the 62nd minute. On 31 May 2007, Montenegro was admitted as FIFA's 208th member.

=== 'Golden' era ===
On 11 September 2012, Montenegro played against San Marino in Seravalle. In a one-sided match, Montenegro won 6–0, the biggest win in the team's history. Montenegro then beat Ukraine 1–0 in Kyiv, with the only goal scored by Dejan Damjanović.

=== Ups and downs ===
On 23 February 2014 in Nice, Montenegro were drawn for qualification in UEFA Euro 2016 qualifying Group G alongside Russia, Sweden, Austria, Moldova and Liechtenstein. Although Montenegro, opened their campaign with a 2–0 victory against Moldova, they failed to qualify with goalless draw against Liechtenstein, a 1–0 loss against Austria and a 1–1 home draw against Sweden. On 27 March 2015, Montenegro's home match against Russia was abandoned after 67 minutes due to crowd violence, after the Russian left-back Dmitri Kombarov was hit by a projectile. The score was goalless and Russia had missed a penalty moments before the match was abandoned. The Russian goalkeeper Igor Akinfeev was hit by a flare, causing a second 33-minute delay. The abandoned match was ruled a 3–0 victory in Russia's favour. Montenegro finished fourth at the end of the campaign and placed 95th on the FIFA ranking list.

== Stadium and facilities ==
Montenegro play their home matches at the Podgorica City Stadium (Montenegrin: Stadion pod Goricom). The stadium's capacity is 15,230, but international matches reduce this to between 10,700 and 13,000.

=== Camp FSCG ===
The Football Association of Montenegro owns Camp FSCG, a Montenegrin training ground. Built in 2007, the centre has a total area of 54,000 square metres. It is located on Ćemovsko polje, a plain located in the outskirts of Podgorica outskirts between the settlements of Stari Aerodrom and Konik. It consists of six pitches with stands and floodlights, and House of Football – the seat of the Football Association of Montenegro.

== Results and fixtures ==
The following is a list of match results in the last 12 months, as well as any future matches that have been scheduled.

Win Draw Loss Fixture

=== 2026 ===
27 March Friendly	Montenegro	2–0	Andorra	Podgorica, Montenegro
18:00 UTC+1	Mugoša 41' (pen.); Osmajić 80'	Report		Stadium: Podgorica City Stadium; Attendance: 1,855; Referee: Enea Jorgji (Albania)

31 March Friendly	Montenegro	2–3	Slovenia	Podgorica, Montenegro
18:00 UTC+2	Osmajić 20', 44'	Report	Vipotnik 41', 55'; Šturm 47'	Stadium: Podgorica City Stadium; Attendance: 3,000; Referee: Duje Strukan (Croatia)

1 June Friendly	Bulgaria	0–1	Montenegro	Plovdiv, Bulgaria
19:00 UTC+3		Report	Sekulić 68'	Stadium: Stadion Hristo Botev; Attendance: 2,323; Referee: Ioannis Papadopoulos (Greece)

5 June Friendly	Slovakia	2–2	Montenegro	Košice, Slovakia
18:30 UTC+2	Boženík 6'; Duda 74'	Report	Osmajić 44', 66' (pen.)	Stadium: Košická futbalová aréna Attendance: 10,432; Referee: Wojciech Myć (Poland)

25 September 2026–27 Nations League	Montenegro	2–1	Cyprus	Podgorica, Montenegro
20:45 UTC+2	Krstović 66' (pen.); Osmajić 86'	Report	Edwards 55'	Stadium: Podgorica City Stadium; Attendance: 6,726; Referee: Daniele Chiffi (Italy)

28 September 2026–27 Nations League	Armenia	2–3	Montenegro	Yerevan, Armenia
20:00 UTC+4	Serobyan 34'; Spertsyan 65'	Report	Piloyan 20' (o.g.); Krstović 38'; Latković 89'	Stadium: Vazgen Sargsyan Republican Stadium; Attendance: 11,400; Referee: José Luis Munuera Montero (Spain)

2 October 2026–27 Nations League	Latvia	1–2	Montenegro	Riga, Latvia
20:00 UTC+3	Strods 82'	Report	Adzic 3', 56'	Stadium: Skonto Stadium; Attendance: 6,149; Referee: Radoslav Gidzhenov (Bulgaria)

5 October 2026–27 Nations League	Montenegro	0–0	Armenia	Podgorica, Montenegro
20:45 UTC+2		Report		Stadium: Podgorica City Stadium; Attendance: 9,700; Referee: Manfredas Lukjančukas (Lithuania)

12 November 2026–27 Nations League	Montenegro	2–1	Latvia	Podgorica, Montenegro
20:45 UTC+2	Krstović 70'; Maraš 90+1'	Report	Meļņiks 72'	Stadium: Podgorica City Stadium; Attendance: 5,799; Referee: Jérôme Brisard (France)

15 November 2026–27 Nations League	Cyprus	1–4	Montenegro	Limassol, Cyprus
16:00 UTC+2	Pittas 52' (pen.)	Report	Osmajić 5'; Vukotić 58'; Krstović 67', 83'	Stadium: Alphamega Stadium; Attendance: 5,695; Referee: Sander van der Eijk (Netherlands)

== Coaching history ==
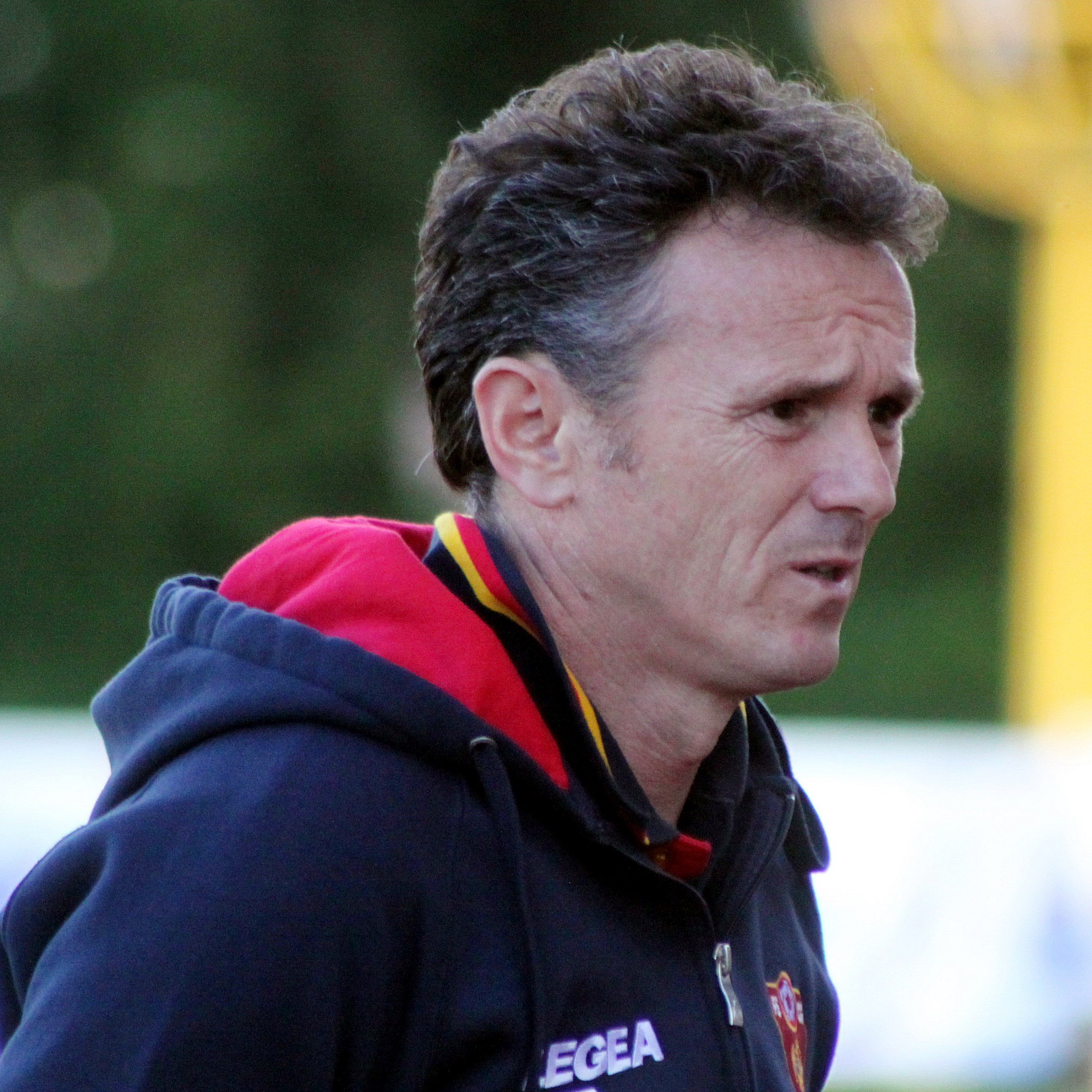
Branko Brnović, the longest serving manager in the history of the Montenegro national team

Manager	Career	Pld	W	D	L	GF	GA	GD	Win %
(Montenegro) Zoran Filipović	2006–2009	23	8	8	7	28	31	−3	34.78
(Croatia) Zlatko Kranjčar	2010–2011	13	6	2	5	14	11	+3	46.15
(Montenegro) Branko Brnović	2011–2015	34	11	9	14	44	50	−6	32.35
(Serbia) Ljubiša Tumbaković	2016–2019	26	7	7	12	33	33	+0	26.92
(Montenegro) Miodrag Džudović	2019 (caretaker)	2	0	1	1	1	4	−3	0.00
(Bosnia and Herzegovina) Faruk Hadžibegić	2019–2020	13	5	4	4	13	16	−3	38.46
(Montenegro) Miodrag Radulović	2020–2023	23	6	4	13	22	35	−13	26.09
(Croatia) Robert Prosinečki	2024–2025	13	5	0	8	11	17	−6	38.46
(Montenegro) Mirko Vučinić	2025–present	13	9	1	3	26	20	+6	69.23

== Players ==
In international football, footballers can normally only play for one national team once they play in all or part of any match recognised as a full international by FIFA. However, an exception is made in cases where one or more newly independent states are created out of a former state. Based on current FIFA rules, a footballer will be eligible to play for Montenegro, even if they had previously represented Serbia and Montenegro or any other country and at least one of the following statements applies:

- The footballer was born in Montenegro;
- At least one of their parents and/or at least one of their grandparents was born in Montenegro;
- The player has lived in Montenegro continuously for any five-year period.

Due to mixed ancestries, it is likely that a high percentage of the footballers eligible to play for Montenegro will also remain eligible to play for Serbia, and vice versa. However, once they have played for either Serbia or Montenegro in any competitive fixture, they are no longer eligible to play for any other nation.

=== Current squad ===
The following players were called up for the 2026–27 UEFA Nations League C matches in November.
Caps and goals as of 15 November 2026, after the match against Cyprus.

No.	Pos.	Player	Date of birth (age)	Caps	Goals	Club
12	GK	Danijel Petković	25 May 1993 (age 33)	30	0	(Latvian Football Federation) Liepāja
1	GK	Balša Popović	10 June 2000 (age 26)	9	0	(Hellenic Football Federation) Olympiacos
13	GK	Igor Nikić	25 August 2000 (age 26)	9	0	(Romanian Football Federation) Argeș Pitești
	DF	Marko Vešović	28 August 1991 (age 35)	64	2	(Croatian Football Federation) Lokomotiva
5	DF	Igor Vujačić	8 August 1994 (age 32)	50	0	(Russian Football Union) Rubin Kazan
3	DF	Risto Radunović	4 May 1992 (age 34)	47	1	(Romanian Football Federation) FCSB
6	DF	Slobodan Rubežić	21 March 2000 (age 26)	15	1	(Polish Football Association) Korona Kielce
	DF	Milan Roganović	28 October 2005 (age 21)	10	0	(Royal Belgian Football Association) Genk
16	DF	Ognjen Gašević	2 April 2002 (age 24)	8	0	(Bulgarian Football Union) CSKA 1948
4	DF	Andrej Đurić	21 September 2003 (age 23)	3	0	(Swedish Football Association) Malmö FF
21	DF	Jonathan Drešaj	15 March 2000 (age 26)	1	0	(Football Association of Montenegro) Dečić
2	DF	Bodin Tomašević	12 May 2006 (age 20)	1	0	(Italian Football Federation) Mantova
8	MF	Marko Janković	9 July 1995 (age 31)	66	1	(Association of Football Federations of Azerbaijan) Qarabağ
18	MF	Sead Hakšabanović	4 May 1999 (age 27)	38	1	(Swedish Football Association) Malmö FF
15	MF	Stefan Lončar	19 February 1996 (age 30)	32	0	(Russian Football Union) Akron Tolyatti
14	MF	Miloš Brnović	26 April 2000 (age 26)	20	0	(Russian Football Union) Arsenal Tula
11	MF	Milan Vukotić	5 October 2002 (age 24)	15	1	(Football Association of Serbia) Partizan
	MF	Andrija Bulatović	27 December 2006 (age 19)	13	1	(French Football Federation) Lens
17	MF	Vasilije Adžić	12 May 2006 (age 20)	12	4	(Italian Football Federation) Sassuolo
10	FW	Stevan Jovetić (captain)	2 November 1989 (age 37)	96	37	(Cyprus Football Association) AEL Limassol
20	FW	Milutin Osmajić	25 July 1999 (age 27)	42	11	(Italian Football Federation) Genoa
9	FW	Nikola Krstović	5 April 2000 (age 26)	40	13	(Italian Football Federation) Atalanta
7	FW	Viktor Đukanović	29 January 2004 (age 22)	11	1	(Hungarian Football Federation) Győri ETO
22	FW	Dušan Vuković	6 August 2002 (age 24)	5	0	(Croatian Football Federation) Lokomotiva Zagreb
23	FW	Aleksa Latković	30 October 2000 (age 26)	2	1	(Croatian Football Federation) Varaždin
19	FW	Aleksa Maraš	9 October 2001 (age 25)	1	1	(Slovak Football Association) Košice

=== Recent call-ups ===
The following players have also been called up in the last twelve months.

Pos.	Player	Date of birth (age)	Caps	Goals	Club	Latest call-up
GK	Mišo Dubljanić	20 December 1999 (age 26)	1	0	(Serbia) Zemun	v. Slovakia, 5 June 2026
GK	Benjamin Kriještarac	18 February 2005 (age 21)	0	0	(Montenegro) Mornar Bar	v. Slovakia, 5 June 2026
DF	Stefan Savić	8 January 1991 (age 35)	82	9	(Turkey) Trabzonspor	v. Latvia, 12 November 2026 ^{SUS}
DF	Adam Marušić	17 October 1992 (age 34)	70	5	(Italy) Lazio	v. Latvia, 12 November 2026 ^{INJ}
DF	Marko Perović	5 March 2006 (age 20)	6	0	(Poland) Raków Częstochowa	v. Armenia, 5 October 2026
DF	Stefan Milić	6 July 2000 (age 26)	3	0	(Serbia) Partizan	v. Armenia, 5 October 2026
DF	Nikola Šipčić	17 May 1995 (age 31)	23	0	(Greece) Asteras Tripolis	v. Slovakia, 5 June 2026
DF	Andrija Ražnatović	24 December 2000 (age 25)	1	0	(Montenegro) Sutjeska Nikšić	v. Slovakia, 5 June 2026
DF	Andrija Vukčević	11 October 1996 (age 30)	23	0	(England) Preston North End	v. Slovenia, 31 March 2026
MF	Marko Šimun	16 June 2001 (age 25)	6	0	(Montenegro) Sutjeska Nikšić	v. Armenia, 5 October 2026
MF	Danilo Vukanić	11 August 2006 (age 20)	1	0	(Montenegro) Budućnost Podgorica	v. Armenia, 5 October 2026
MF	Driton Camaj	7 March 1997 (age 29)	32	2	(Turkey) Muğlaspor	v. Slovakia, 5 June 2026
MF	Vladimir Jovović	26 October 1994 (age 32)	64	0	(Uzbekistan) Neftchi Fergana	v. Slovenia, 31 March 2026
MF	Novica Eraković	12 November 1999 (age 27)	7	0	(Greece) Panetolikos	v. Slovenia, 31 March 2026
FW	Balša Sekulić	10 June 1998 (age 28)	5	1	(Indonesia) Persib Bandung	v. Slovakia, 5 June 2026
FW	Andrej Kostić	16 January 2007 (age 19)	4	0	(Netherlands) Sparta Rotterdam	v. Slovakia, 5 June 2026
FW	Stefan Mugoša	23 February 1992 (age 34)	65	16	(South Korea) Incheon United	v. Slovenia, 31 March 2026
Notes: ^{WD} = Player withdrew from the current squad due to non-injury issue.; ^{INJ} = Not part of the current squad due to injury.

== Player records ==
As of 16 November 2026
Players in bold are still active with Montenegro.

=== Most appearances ===
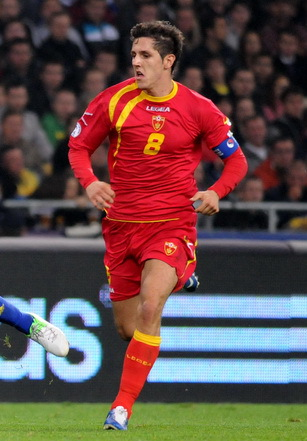
Stevan Jovetić is Montenegro's most capped player and top scorer.

Rank	Player	Caps	Goals	Career
1	**Stevan Jovetić**	96	37	2007–present
2	Fatos Bećiraj	86	15	2009–2022
3	**Stefan Savić**	82	9	2010–present
4	**Adam Marušić**	70	5	2015–present
5	**Marko Janković**	66	1	2016–present
6	Stefan Mugoša	65	16	2015–2026
7	**Vladimir Jovović**	64	0	2013–present
7	Žarko Tomašević	64	5	2010–2023
9	**Marko Vešović**	63	2	2013–present
10	Elsad Zverotić	61	5	2008–2017

=== Top goalscorers ===
Rank	Player	Goals	Caps	Average	Career
1	**Stevan Jovetić**	37	96	0.39	2007–present
2	Mirko Vučinić	17	46	0.37	2007–2017
3	Stefan Mugoša	16	65	0.25	2015–2026
4	Fatos Bećiraj	15	86	0.17	2009–2022
5	**Nikola Krstović**	13	40	0.29	2022–present
6	**Milutin Osmajić**	11	42	0.26	2020–present
7	**Stefan Savić**	9	82	0.11	2010–present
8	Dejan Damjanović	8	30	0.27	2008–2015
9	Radomir Đalović	7	26	0.27	2007–2012
10	Andrija Delibašić	6	21	0.29	2009–2013

== Competitive record ==
Competition	Pld	W	D	L	GF	GA	GD
FIFA World Cup qualifiers	45	14	13	18	65	70	-5
UEFA European Championship qualifiers	37	10	10	17	32	57	−25
UEFA Nations League	30	14	4	12	40	29	+11
Friendly games	55	21	14	19	65	66	−1
Overall	167	59	41	66	202	222	−20

Updated: 16 November 2026

=== FIFA World Cup ===
FIFA World Cup record									Qualification record						
Year	Result	Position	Pld	W	D	L	GF	GA	Pos	Pld	W	D	L	GF	GA
(Uruguay) 1930 to (France) 1938	Part of Yugoslavia								Part of Yugoslavia						
(Brazil) 1950 to (Italy) 1990	Part of Yugoslavia								Part of Yugoslavia						
(United States) 1994 to (South Korea) (Japan) 2002	Part of FR Yugoslavia								Part of FR Yugoslavia						
(Germany) 2006	Part of Serbia and Montenegro								Part of Serbia and Montenegro						
(South Africa) 2010	Did not qualify								5th	10	1	6	3	9	14
(Brazil) 2014	Did not qualify								3rd	10	4	3	3	18	17
(Russia) 2018	Did not qualify								3rd	10	5	1	4	20	12
(Qatar) 2022	Did not qualify								4th	10	3	3	4	14	15
(Canada) (Mexico) (United States) 2026	Did not qualify								4th	8	3	0	5	8	17
(Morocco) (Portugal) (Spain) 2030	To be determined								To be determined						
(Saudi Arabia) 2034	To be determined								To be determined						
Total	0/4								—	48	16	13	19	69	75

=== UEFA European Championship ===
UEFA European Championship record									Qualification record							Qualification play-offs record					
Year	Result	Position	Pld	W	D	L	GF	GA	Pos.	Pld	W	D	L	GF	GA	Pld	W	D	L	GF	GA
(France) 1960	Part of Yugoslavia								Part of Yugoslavia							Part of Yugoslavia					
(Spain) 1964	Part of Yugoslavia								Part of Yugoslavia							Part of Yugoslavia					
(Italy) 1968	Part of Yugoslavia								Part of Yugoslavia							Part of Yugoslavia					
(Belgium) 1972	Part of Yugoslavia								Part of Yugoslavia							Part of Yugoslavia					
(Socialist Federal Republic of Yugoslavia) 1976	Part of Yugoslavia								Part of Yugoslavia							Part of Yugoslavia					
(Italy) 1980	Part of Yugoslavia								Part of Yugoslavia							Part of Yugoslavia					
(France) 1984	Part of Yugoslavia								Part of Yugoslavia							Part of Yugoslavia					
(West Germany) 1988	Part of Yugoslavia								Part of Yugoslavia							Part of Yugoslavia					
(Sweden) 1992	Part of Yugoslavia								Part of Yugoslavia							Part of Yugoslavia					
(England) 1996	Part of FR Yugoslavia								Part of FR Yugoslavia							Part of FR Yugoslavia					
(Belgium) (Netherlands) 2000	Part of FR Yugoslavia								Part of FR Yugoslavia							Part of FR Yugoslavia					
(Portugal) 2004	Part of Serbia and Montenegro								Part of Serbia and Montenegro							Part of Serbia and Montenegro					
(Austria) (Switzerland) 2008	Did not enter								Did not enter							Did not enter					
(Poland) (Ukraine) 2012	Did not qualify								PO	8	3	3	2	7	7	2	0	0	2	0	3
(France) 2016	Did not qualify								4th	10	3	2	5	10	13	Did not qualify					
(Europe) 2020	Did not qualify								5th	8	0	3	5	3	22	Did not qualify					
(Germany) 2024	Did not qualify								3rd	8	3	2	3	9	11	Did not qualify					
(England) (Scotland) (Republic of Ireland) (Wales) 2028	To be determined								To be determined							To be determined					
(Italy) (Turkey) 2032	To be determined								To be determined							To be determined					
Total	0/4								—	34	9	10	15	29	53	2	0	0	2	0	3

=== UEFA Nations League ===
UEFA Nations League record
Season	Division	Group	Pld	W	D	L	GF	GA	P/R	RK
2018–19	C	4	6	2	1	3	7	6	Same position	35th
2020–21	C	1	6	4	1	1	10	2	▲	34th
2022–23	B	3	6	2	1	3	6	6	Same position	28th
2024–25	B	4	6	1	0	5	4	9	▼	30th
2026–27	C	2	6	5	1	0	13	6	▲	33th
2028–29	B	TBD	0	0	0	0	0	0	TBD	TBD
Total			30	14	4	12	40	29	28th	

== Head-to-head record ==
Below is a summary of Montenegrin national team results against every opponent country.

As of 16 November 2026

Opponent	P	W	D	L	GF	GA	GD	Win %
Albania	2	0	0	2	2	4	−2	0.00
Armenia	6	2	2	2	11	9	+2	33.33
Andorra	1	1	0	0	2	0	+2	100.00
Austria	2	0	0	2	2	4	−2	0.00
Azerbaijan	3	2	1	0	4	0	+4	66.67
Belarus	5	3	2	0	6	1	+5	60.00
Belgium	2	0	1	1	2	4	−2	0.00
Bosnia and Herzegovina	4	0	3	1	1	2	−1	0.00
Bulgaria	9	4	4	1	10	9	+1	44.44
Colombia	1	0	0	1	0	1	−1	0.00
Croatia	2	0	0	2	2	7	−5	0.00
Cyprus	7	4	3	0	15	5	+10	57.14
Czech Republic	7	0	0	7	1	17	−16	0.00
Denmark	3	1	0	2	2	3	−1	33.33
England	6	0	3	3	5	19	−14	0.00
Estonia	1	1	0	0	1	0	+1	100.00
Faroe Islands	2	1	0	1	1	4	−3	50.00
Finland	2	0	0	2	0	4	−4	0.00
Georgia	3	1	1	1	3	4	−1	33.33
Ghana	1	1	0	0	1	0	+1	100.00
Gibraltar	4	4	0	0	12	3	+9	100.00
Greece	2	1	0	1	2	2	+0	50.00
Hungary	5	2	2	1	8	8	+0	40.00
Iceland	3	1	0	2	2	5	−3	33.33
Israel	1	0	0	1	1	3	−2	0.00
Iran	2	0	1	1	1	2	−1	0.00
Italy	2	0	0	2	1	4	−3	0.00
Japan	1	0	0	1	0	2	−2	0.00
Kazakhstan	4	3	1	0	11	0	+11	75.00
Kosovo	2	0	1	1	1	3	−2	0.00
Latvia	6	4	2	0	9	4	+5	66.67
Lebanon	1	1	0	0	3	2	+1	100.00
Liechtenstein	3	2	1	0	4	1	+3	66.67
Lithuania	4	3	1	0	10	3	+7	75.00
Luxembourg	3	2	0	1	6	3	+3	66.67
Moldova	4	3	0	1	7	5	+2	75.00
North Macedonia	4	2	0	2	5	7	−2	50.00
Netherlands	2	0	1	1	2	6	−4	0.00
Northern Ireland	1	1	0	0	2	0	+2	100.00
Norway	4	1	0	3	4	6	−2	25.00
Poland	4	0	2	2	6	9	−3	0.00
Republic of Ireland	2	0	2	0	0	0	+0	0.00
Romania	7	3	2	2	7	6	+1	42.86
Russia	2	0	0	2	0	5	−5	0.00
San Marino	2	2	0	0	9	0	+9	100.00
Serbia	4	0	0	4	2	9	−7	0.00
Slovakia	3	0	2	1	4	6	−2	0.00
Slovenia	4	0	1	3	3	7	−4	0.00
Sweden	3	0	1	2	3	6	−3	0.00
Switzerland	2	1	0	1	1	2	−1	50.00
Turkey	6	1	2	3	8	9	−1	16.67
Ukraine	2	1	0	1	1	4	−3	50.00
Uzbekistan	1	1	0	0	1	0	+1	100.00
Wales	5	2	0	3	5	6	−1	40.00
54 Teams	174	62	42	70	212	235	−23	35.63

== See also ==
- Montenegro men's national football team results
- Montenegro men's national football team records and statistics
- List of Montenegro international footballers
- Montenegro women's national football team
- Montenegro women's national under-17 football team
- Football in Montenegro
- Sport in Montenegro
