= Yanis Karabelyov =

Bulgarian footballer

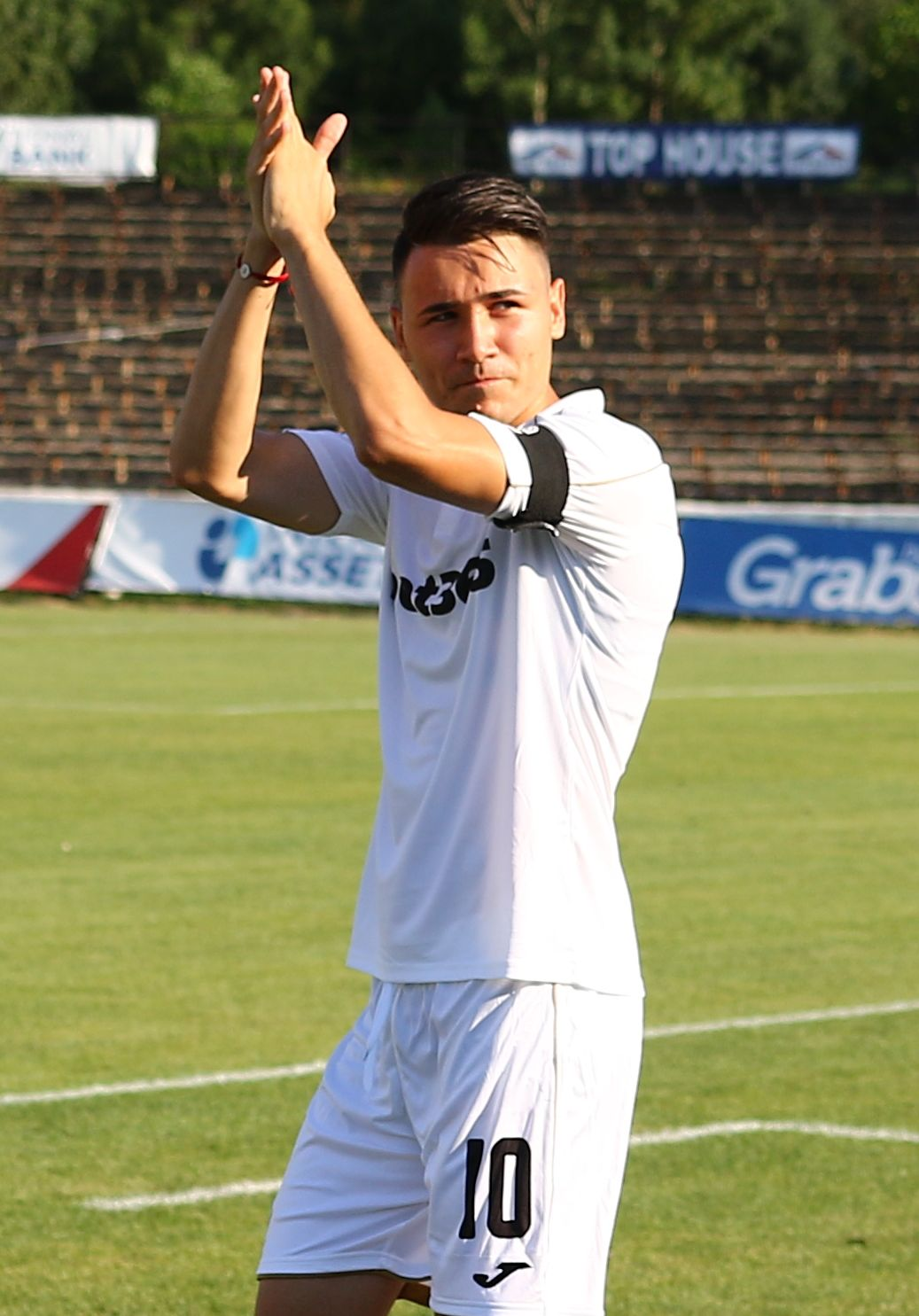
- Karabelyov in 2019

Personal information
- Full name: Yanis Danielov Karabelyov
- Date of birth: 23 January 1996 (age 30)
- Place of birth: Sofia, Bulgaria
- Height: 1.83 m (6 ft 0 in)
- Position: Midfielder

Team information
- Current team: Malmö FF
- Number: 6

Youth career
- 2003–2014: Slavia Sofia

Senior career*
Years	Team	Apps	(Gls)
2013–2020	Slavia Sofia	138	(9)
2017	→ Tsarsko Selo (loan)	10	(0)
2021–2023	Kisvárda	74	(3)
2023–2025	Botev Plovdiv	63	(5)
2025–2026	Partizan	20	(2)
2026–	Malmö FF	5	(0)

International career^{‡}
2012–2013	Bulgaria U17	5	(0)
2014	Bulgaria U19	1	(0)
2015–2018	Bulgaria U21	14	(0)
2019–	Bulgaria	12	(0)
- * Club domestic league appearances and goals as of 24 May 2026 ‡ National team caps and goals as of 27 March 2023

Yanis Danielov Karabelyov (Bulgarian: Янис Даниелов Карабельов; born 23 January 1996) is a Bulgarian professional footballer who plays as a midfielder for Allsvenskan club Malmö FF and the Bulgarian national team.

== Club career ==
=== Slavia Sofia ===
Karabelyov joined Slavia Sofia at the age of seven. He made his senior debut for the club on 28 September 2013, replacing Fernando Silva for the final 12 minutes of an A Group match against Levski Sofia at Ovcha Kupel Stadium. On 17 May 2014, Karabelyov scored his first goal in a 2–0 home win over Pirin Gotse Delchev. One year later, he started in the A Group for first time in a 3–1 home loss against Cherno More Varna on 22 May 2015.

Karabelyov began to establish himself in the Slavia first team from the 2015–16 season.

==== Tsarsko Selo (loan) ====
On 6 September 2017, Karabelyov was loaned to Tsarsko Selo until the end of the year, but on 8 January 2018 Slavia shorted his loan and he returned in train with the team.

=== Kisvárda ===
On 19 December 2020, Karabelyov joined the Hungarian team Kisvárda.

=== Botev Plovdiv ===
On 1 July 2023, Karabelyov joined Botev Plovdiv.

=== Malmö FF ===
In February 2026, he joined Malmö FF, signing a two-year contract with the club.

== International career ==
Karabelyov was called up to the Bulgaria U21 squad in August 2015, aged 19. He made his debut on 9 October 2015 against Armenia U21. In that match, he came as a substitute in the 81st minute, and Bulgaria won the match 2–0.

On 7 March 2016, Karabelyov was called up for the first time to the senior Bulgarian squad for friendly matches against Portugal and against North Macedonia.

He made his debut on 7 June 2019 in a Euro 2020 qualifier against Czech Republic, as a 64th-minute substitute for Kristiyan Malinov.

== Career statistics ==
=== Club ===
As of match played 27 August 2026

Appearances and goals by club, season and competition
Club	Season	League			National cup (Note: Includes Bulgarian Cup and Magyar Kupa)		Continental		Other		Total	
Club	Season	Division	Apps	Goals	Apps	Goals	Apps	Goals	Apps	Goals	Apps	Goals
Slavia Sofia	2013–14	A Group	4	1	1	0	—		—		5	1
Slavia Sofia	2014–15	A Group	4	0	0	0	—		—		4	0
Slavia Sofia	2015–16	A Group	25	0	0	0	—		—		25	0
Slavia Sofia	2016–17	Bulgarian First League	21	0	1	0	2 (Note: Appearance(s) in UEFA Europa League)	0	—		24	0
Slavia Sofia	2017–18	Bulgarian First League	15	1	3	0	—		—		18	1
Slavia Sofia	2018–19	Bulgarian First League	34	3	1	0	4	0	1 (Note: Appearance in Bulgarian Supercup)	0	40	3
Slavia Sofia	2019–20	Bulgarian First League	23	4	1	0	—		—		24	4
Slavia Sofia	2020–21	Bulgarian First League	12	0	0	0	1	0	—		13	0
Slavia Sofia	Total		138	9	7	0	7	0	1	0	153	9
Tsarsko Selo (loan)	2017–18	Bulgarian Second League	10	0	2	0	—		—		12	0
Kisvárda	2020–21	Nemzeti Bajnokság I	17	0	3	1	—		—		20	1
Kisvárda	2021–22	Nemzeti Bajnokság I	27	2	2	0	—		—		29	2
Kisvárda	2022–23	Nemzeti Bajnokság I	30	1	3	0	4 (Note: Appearances in UEFA Europa Conference League)	0	—		37	1
Kisvárda	Total		74	3	8	1	4	0	0	0	86	4
Botev Plovdiv	2023–24	Bulgarian First League	32	3	2	0	—		—		34	3
Botev Plovdiv	2024–25	Bulgarian First League	31	2	2	0	4 (Note: Two appearances in UEFA Europa League, two appearances in UEFA Conference League)	0	1	0	38	2
Botev Plovdiv	Total		63	5	4	0	4	0	1	0	72	5
Partizan	2025–26	Serbian SuperLiga	20	2	1	0	6 (Note: Four appearances in UEFA Europa League, two appearances in UEFA Conference League)	0	—		27	2
Malmö	2026	Allsvenskan	5	0	5	0	0	0	—		10	0
Career total			310	19	27	1	21	0	2	0	360	20

=== International ===
As of match played 12 October 2023

Appearances and goals by national team and year
National team	Year	Apps	Goals
Bulgaria	2019	1	0
Bulgaria	2020	5	0
Bulgaria	2022	4	0
Bulgaria	2023	2	0
Total		12	0

== Honours ==
Slavia Sofia

- Bulgarian Cup: 2017–18

Botev Plovdiv

- Bulgarian Cup: 2023–24
