= Nikola Simić (footballer, born 2007) =

Serbian footballer (born 2007)

Personal information
- Full name: Nikola Simić
- Date of birth: 30 March 2007 (age 19)
- Place of birth: Ub, Serbia
- Height: 1.92 m (6 ft 4 in)
- Position: Centre-back

Team information
- Current team: Partizan
- Number: 40

Youth career
- 2021–2024: Partizan

Senior career*
Years	Team	Apps	(Gls)
2024–	Partizan	54	(2)

International career^{‡}
2022	Serbia U16	3	(0)
2022–2024	Serbia U17	10	(2)
2024–	Serbia U19	17	(1)
2025–	Serbia U21	1	(0)
2026–	Serbia	3	(0)
- * Club domestic league appearances and goals as of 8 November 2026 ‡ National team caps and goals as of 24 September 2026

Nikola Simić (Serbian Cyrillic: Никола Симић; born 30 March 2007) is a Serbian professional footballer who plays as a defender for Partizan.

== Club career ==
A product of the Partizan youth academy, Simić was first included in the club's roster for a UEFA Conference League qualifying match against Gent on 22 August 2024, but did not appear on the pitch. On 1 February 2025, he made his debut for Partizan's main team, starting in the 2024–25 Serbian SuperLiga match against Spartak Subotica.

== International career ==
He played for the Serbian national teams at U16, U17 and U19 levels.

== Honours ==
Individual

- Serbian SuperLiga Team of the season: 2025–26

=== International ===
As of 23 September 2026

Appearances and goals by national team and year
National team	Year	Apps	Goals
Serbia	2026	3	0
Total		3	0
