= Jovan Ćirić =

Serbian footballer (born 2007)

Personal information
- Full name: Jovan Ćirić
- Date of birth: 25 February 2007 (age 19)
- Place of birth: Knjaževac, Serbia
- Position: Left winger

Team information
- Current team: Mladost Lučani
- Number: 25

Youth career
- Real Niš
- 2023–2024: Mladost Lučani

Senior career*
Years	Team	Apps	(Gls)
2023–	Mladost Lučani	66	(7)

International career^{‡}
2024	Serbia U17	5	(0)
2025	Serbia U18	1	(0)
2024–	Serbia U19	8	(0)
- * Club domestic league appearances and goals as of 13 August 2026 ‡ National team caps and goals as of 13 August 2026

Jovan Ćirić (Serbian Cyrillic: Јован Ћирић, born 25 February 2007) is a Serbian professional footballer who plays as a left winger for Serbian SuperLiga club Mladost Lučani.

== Early life ==
Born in Knjaževac, Ćirić spent part of his youth development playing for Real Niš before moving to the youth setup of Mladost Lučani in September 2023.

== Club career ==
Ćirić made his professional debut for Mladost Lučani on 1 November 2023 in a Serbian Cup match against OFK Vršac. On 1 January 2024, he officially signed his first professional contract and was promoted to the first-team squad.

During the 2025–26 Serbian SuperLiga season, Ćirić emerged as one of the club's key attacking players, scoring notable goals against Partizan, Radnički 1923, and a decisive goal against TSC.

== International career ==
Ćirić has represented Serbia at youth level, earning caps for the under-17, under-18, and under-19 national teams.

== Career statistics ==
=== Club ===
As of match played 13 August 2026

Appearances and goals by club, season and competition
Club	Season	League			Serbian Cup		Europe		Other		Total	
Club	Season	Division	Apps	Goals	Apps	Goals	Apps	Goals	Apps	Goals	Apps	Goals
Mladost Lučani	2023–24	Serbian SuperLiga	12	0	1	0	—		—		13	0
Mladost Lučani	2024–25	Serbian SuperLiga	29	4	1	0	—		—		30	4
Mladost Lučani	2025–26	Serbian SuperLiga	23	3	0	0	—		—		23	3
Mladost Lučani	Total		64	7	2	0	0	0	—		66	7
Career total			64	7	2	0	0	0	0	0	66	7

=== International ===
As of match played 13 August 2026

Appearances and goals by national team and year
National team	Year	Apps	Goals
Serbia U19	2024	3	0
Serbia U19	2025	5	0
Total		8	0
