= Ahmed Hadžimujović =

Serbian footballer

Personal information
- Full name: Ahmed Hadžimujović
- Date of birth: 17 August 2007 (age 19)
- Place of birth: Novi Pazar, Serbia
- Height: 1.90 m (6 ft 3 in)
- Position: Centre-back

Team information
- Current team: Novi Pazar
- Number: 4

Youth career
- Novi Pazar

Senior career*
Years	Team	Apps	(Gls)
2025–	Novi Pazar	36	(0)

International career^{‡}
2025	Serbia U18	1	(0)
2025–	Serbia U19	11	(0)
- * Club domestic league appearances and goals as of 24 September 2026 ‡ National team caps and goals as of 24 September 2026

Ahmed Hadžimujović (Serbian Cyrillic: Ахмед Хаџимујовић; born 17 August 2007) is a Serbian professional footballer who plays as a defender for Novi Pazar.

== Club career ==
In 2025, Hadžimujović made his debut for his hometown club, Novi Pazar, making 35 appearances across all competitions under head coaches Vladimir Gaćinović and Nenad Lalatović and attracting interest from Serbian giants, Partizan.

== International career ==
In June 2026, Hadžimujović was selected to represent Serbia at the 2026 UEFA European Under-19 Championship.

== Personal life ==
Hadžimujović is eligible to play for Bosnia and Herzegovina as well, through family roots.
