= Jovan Milošević =

Serbian footballer (born 2005)

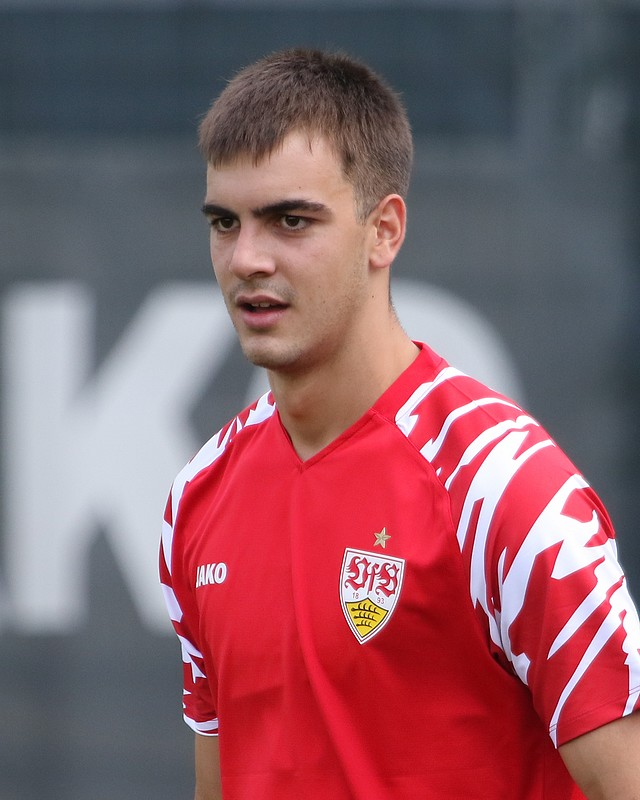
- Milošević with VfB Stuttgart in 2023

Personal information
- Date of birth: 31 July 2005 (age 21)
- Place of birth: Čačak, Serbia and Montenegro
- Height: 1.90 m (6 ft 3 in)
- Position: Forward

Team information
- Current team: Braga
- Number: 17

Youth career
- Borac Čačak
- 2018–2022: Vojvodina

Senior career*
Years	Team	Apps	(Gls)
2022–2023	Vojvodina	18	(3)
2023–2026	VfB Stuttgart	5	(0)
2024	→ St. Gallen (loan)	16	(4)
2025	→ Partizan (loan)	22	(15)
2026	→ Werder Bremen (loan)	13	(3)
2026–	Braga	6	(0)

International career^{‡}
2019	Serbia U15	2	(0)
2021	Serbia U16	2	(2)
2021–2022	Serbia U17	14	(10)
2023	Serbia U18	5	(4)
2023	Serbia U19	10	(3)
2024–	Serbia U21	6	(0)
2025–	Serbia	2	(0)
- * Club domestic league appearances and goals as of 17 Novembar 2026 ‡ National team caps and goals as of 17 November 2026

Jovan Milošević (Serbian Cyrillic: Јован Милошевић; born 31 July 2005) is a Serbian professional footballer who plays as a forward for Portuguese Primeira Liga club Braga and the Serbia national team.

== Club career ==
On 10 July 2022, Milošević made his first-team debut for Vojvodina, replacing Nebojša Bastajić in the 65th minute in a 1–0 home win against Napredak Kruševac.

On 25 January 2023, it was officially announced that the striker would join Bundesliga side VfB Stuttgart from the start of the 2023–24 season, signing a contract until June 2027 with the German club.

On 13 February 2024, Milošević moved on loan to Swiss club St. Gallen.

On 16 January 2025, Milošević joined Partizan on a one-year loan. On 31 July 2025, he scored a hat-trick in the first half of a 4–0 win over Oleksandriya in the UEFA Conference League qualifications. Until his departure in January 2026, he scored 16 goals 23 appearances in the 2025–26 season for Partizan.

Milošević joined VfB Stuttgart's Bundesliga rivals Werder Bremen on loan until the end of the season in January 2026. The clubs agreed a loan fee of up to €600,000 based on appearances, while Stuttgart agreed a two-year contract extension until 2029 with Milošević.

On 19 August 2026, Milošević signed a five-year contract with Braga in Portugal.

== International career ==
With five goals, Milošević was the top scorer of 2022 UEFA European Under-17 Championship in which Serbia reached the semi-finals, where they lost to the Netherlands on penalties. He scored a goal in every game he played.

== Personal life ==
Milošević was born in Čačak to a Serbian father and Romanian mother.

== Career statistics ==
=== Club ===
As of 17 November 2026

Appearances and goals by club, season and competition
Club	Season	League			Cup		League Cup		Continental		Total	
Club	Season	Division	Apps	Goals	Apps	Goals	Apps	Goals	Apps	Goals	Apps	Goals
Vojvodina	2022–23	Serbian SuperLiga	18	3	2	0	—		—		20	3
VfB Stuttgart	2023–24	Bundesliga	5	0	1	0	—		—		6	0
St. Gallen (loan)	2023–24	Swiss Super League	11	3	0	0	—		—		11	3
St. Gallen (loan)	2024–25	Swiss Super League	5	1	1	0	—		4 (Note: Appearances in UEFA Conference League)	0	10	1
St. Gallen (loan)	Total		16	4	1	0	—		4	0	21	4
Partizan (loan)	2024–25	Serbian SuperLiga	5	3	2	0	—		—		7	3
Partizan (loan)	2025–26	Serbian SuperLiga	17	12	0	0	—		6 (Note: Two appearances in UEFA Europa League, four appearances and four goals in UEFA Conference League)	4	23	16
Partizan (loan)	Total		22	15	2	0	—		6	4	30	19
Werder Bremen (loan)	2025–26	Bundesliga	13	3	—		—		—		13	3
Braga	2026–27	Primeira Liga	6	0	0	0	0	0	3	0	9	0
Career total			80	25	6	0	0	0	13	4	99	29

=== International ===
As of match played 31 May 2026

Appearances and goals by national team and year
National team	Year	Apps	Goals
Serbia	2025	1	0
Serbia	2026	1	0
Total		2	0

== Honours ==
Individual

- UEFA European Under-17 Championship top scorer: 2022
- Serbian SuperLiga Player of the Week: 2024–25 (Round 30)
