= Ognjen Ugrešić =

Serbian footballer (born 2006)

Personal information
- Date of birth: 15 July 2006 (age 20)
- Place of birth: Kikinda, Serbia
- Height: 1.88 m (6 ft 2 in)
- Position: Midfielder

Team information
- Current team: PAOK
- Number: 16

Youth career
- Mladi Vukovi
- Pera Sports Club
- 2020–2024: Partizan

Senior career*
Years	Team	Apps	(Gls)
2024–2026	Partizan	53	(10)
2025	→ Teleoptik (loan)	3	(2)
2026–	PAOK	7	(1)

International career^{‡}
2022	Serbia U16	5	(0)
2022	Serbia U17	1	(0)
2023	Serbia U18	2	(0)
2024–2025	Serbia U19	6	(1)
2025–	Serbia U21	4	(0)
2025–	Serbia	1	(0)
- * Club domestic league appearances and goals as of 9 November 2026 ‡ National team caps and goals as of 14 October 2025

Ognjen Ugrešić (Serbian Cyrillic: Огњен Угрешић; born 15 July 2006) is a Serbian professional footballer who plays as a midfielder for Super League Greece club PAOK and the Serbia national team.

== Club career ==
Born in Kikinda, Ugrešić began his career at Mladi Vukovi football academy. From there, three years later, through Momčilo Vukotić, he moved to Partizan. At the age of eight, he joined the youth system of Partizan. On 8 December 2024, he made his senior debut for the club in a 2024–25 Serbian SuperLiga match against Železničar Pančevo. On 27 April 2025 , he scored his first goal for Partizan in a game against Radnički 1923.

On 17 July 2025, in the first qualifying round for the Europa League, Ugrešić scored in a 2–1 victory against AEK Larnaca, although Partizan lost the two-legged tie 6–5 on penalties. In the second qualifying round of the UEFA Conference League, Ugrešić was the scorer in a 0–2 win against Oleksandriya.

On 29 August 2026, Ugrešić signed a five-year contract with Super League Greece club PAOK.

== International career ==
Ugrešić played for the Serbian national teams at U16, U17, U18, and U19 levels. He also was first capped for the senior team in a 3-1 victory over Andorra in October 2025, subbing on for Aleksandar Stanković in the 89th minute.

== Career statistics ==
=== International ===
As of match played 14 October 2025

Appearances and goals by national team and year
National team	Year	Apps	Goals
Serbia	2025	1	0
Total		1	0

== Honours ==
Individual

- Serbian SuperLiga Player of the Week: 2024–25 (Round 36)
