= Aranđel Stojković =

Serbian footballer

Personal information
- Date of birth: 2 March 1995 (age 31)
- Place of birth: Belgrade, FR Yugoslavia
- Height: 1.82 m (6 ft 0 in)
- Position: Right-back

Team information
- Current team: TSC
- Number: 30

Youth career
- Budućnost Dobanovci
- 2009–2012: Teleoptik
- 2013–2014: BSK Borča

Senior career*
Years	Team	Apps	(Gls)
2013–2015	BSK Borča	37	(2)
2016	OFK Beograd	5	(1)
2016–2018	Spartak Subotica	64	(5)
2018–2021	Vojvodina	90	(4)
2021–2023	TSC	60	(1)
2023–2026	Partizan	51	(4)
2024–2025	→ Debreceni (loan)	18	(1)
2026–	TSC	0	(0)

International career^{‡}
2021	Serbia	1	(0)
- * Club domestic league appearances and goals as of 22 April 2026 ‡ National team caps and goals as of 29 January 2021

Aranđel Stojković (Serbian Cyrillic: Аранђел Стојковић; born on 2 March 1995) is a Serbian footballer who plays as a defender for TSC.

== Club career ==
Born in Belgrade, Stojković joined BSK Borča in 2013, where he started his senior career same year. He made several appearances during the 2013–14 season, and after he ended his youth career, he became the first choice on right-back place for the next season. Stojković joined OFK Beograd beginning of 2016. In September 2016, Stojković signed with Spartak Subotica, where he stayed for 2 seasons. On 16 June 2018, Stojković moved to Vojvodina. The transfer fee was reported as €100k plus 10 percent of the future transfer.

== International career ==
He was called to U20 national team and played some friendly matches, but he was not in squad for 2015 World Youth Cup.

On the senior level, Stojković was capped once, in a January 2021 friendly match away against Panama.

== Career statistics ==
=== Club ===
As of 22 April 2026

Appearances and goals by club, season and competition
Club	Season	League			Cup		Continental		Other		Total	
Club	Season	Division	Apps	Goals	Apps	Goals	Apps	Goals	Apps	Goals	Apps	Goals
BSK Borča	2013–14	Serbian First League	7 (Note: confusion with Nikola Stojković's statistics on several websites)	1	—		—		—		7	1
BSK Borča	2014–15	Serbian First League	27	1	1	0	—		—		28	1
BSK Borča	2015–16	Serbian First League	3 (Note: confusion with Danijel Stojković's statistics on several websites)	0	—		—		—		3	0
BSK Borča	Total		37	2	1	0	—		—		38	2
OFK Beograd	2015–16	Serbian SuperLiga	2	0	1	0	—		—		3	0
OFK Beograd	2016–17	Serbian First League	3	1	—		—		—		3	1
OFK Beograd	Total		5	1	1	0	—		—		6	1
Spartak Subotica	2016–17	Serbian SuperLiga	28	2	2	0	—		—		30	2
Spartak Subotica	2017–18	Serbian SuperLiga	35	3	1	0	—		—		36	3
Spartak Subotica	Total		63	5	3	0	—		—		66	5
Vojvodina	2018–19	Serbian SuperLiga	27	0	1	0	—		—		28	0
Vojvodina	2019–20	Serbian SuperLiga	27	2	5	1	—		—		32	3
Vojvodina	2020–21	Serbian SuperLiga	36	2	4	0	1	0	—		41	2
Vojvodina	Total		90	4	10	1	1	0	—		101	5
TSC	2021–22	Serbian SuperLiga	31	0	3	0	—		—		34	0
TSC	2022–23	Serbian SuperLiga	29	1	3	0	—		—		32	1
TSC	Total		60	1	6	0	—		—		66	1
Partizan	2023–24	Serbian SuperLiga	35	3	3	0	4	0	—		42	3
Partizan	2025–26	Serbian SuperLiga	16	1	1	0	2	0	—		19	1
Partizan	Total		51	4	4	0	6	0	—		61	4
Debreceni (loan)	2024–25	Nemzeti Bajnokság I	16	1	2	0	—		—		18	1
Career total			323	18	27	1	7	0	—		357	19

== Honours ==
Vojvodina

- Serbian Cup: 2019–20
