= Nemanja Trifunović =

Serbian footballer (born 2004)

Personal information
- Full name: Nemanja Trifunović
- Date of birth: 29 June 2004 (age 22)
- Place of birth: Čačak, Serbia and Montenegro
- Height: 1.72 m (5 ft 8 in)
- Position: Left winger

Team information
- Current team: Partizan
- Number: 32

Youth career
- Borac 1926
- 2020–2023: Partizan

Senior career*
Years	Team	Apps	(Gls)
2023–	Partizan	66	(7)

International career^{‡}
2021	Serbia U18	2	(0)
2024–	Serbia U21	6	(0)
- * Club domestic league appearances and goals as of 8 November 2026 ‡ National team caps and goals as of 17 November 2026

Nemanja Trifunović (Serbian Cyrillic: Немања Трифуновић; born 29 June 2004) is a Serbian professional footballer who plays as a left winger for Serbian club Partizan.

== Club career ==
Trifunović played for the youth teams of Borac 1926. He later moved to FK Partizan. He signed his first professional contract with the club in September 2020. After winning the Serbian Youth League, he underwent training with the first team under coach Igor Duljaj. He extended his contract with the club until the end of July 2023.

Trifunović made his debut in the second round of the Serbian SuperLiga for the 2023/24 season, replacing Xander Severina in the 84th minute of the match against Vojvodina. He appeared in the play-offs of the Conference League qualifiers, against Nordsjælland. He was in the starting lineup of Partizan for the first time in round 16 of the Serbian Cup for the 2023–24 season, against Grafičar Beograd.

During the 2025–26 season, Trifunović continued to be part of the Partizan first-team squad. He played both domestically, and in matches of UEFA.

== International career ==
Trifunović passed the selection camp under the auspices of the FSS. He made his debut for the Serbia U18 team in a two-match against Bosnia and Herzegovina U18 in April 2021. Since 2024, Trifunović have been playing for the Serbia U21 national team and also participated in UEFA European Under-21 Championship qualification matches.
