= 2023–24 FK Vojvodina season =

FK Vojvodina
2023–24 season
- President: Dragoljub Zbiljić
- Head coach: Radoslav Batak (until 8 September); Ranko Popović (from 11 September until 27 December); Božidar Bandović (from 28 December)
- Stadium: Karađorđe Stadium
- Serbian SuperLiga: 4th
- Serbian Cup: Runners-up
- Conference League: Second qualifying round
- Top goalscorer: League: Mihailo Ivanović (9); All: Dejan Zukić (12)
- Highest home attendance: League: 9,635 vs Red Star Belgrade (28 April 2024); Europe: 6,705 vs APOEL (3 August 2023)
- Lowest home attendance: 350 vs Napredak (11 December 2023)
- Average home league attendance: 3,602
Home colours	Away colours	Third colours
- All statistics correct as of 26 May 2024.

The 2023–24 season was Vojvodina's 109th season in existence and the club's 18th competing in the Serbian SuperLiga.

== Transfers ==
=== In ===
Date	Position	Name	From	Type	Ref.
12 June 2023	DF	(Serbia) Marko Kerkez	(Serbia) Kabel	Free Transfer	
14 June 2023	MF	(Montenegro) Asmir Kajević	(China) Wuhan Yangtze River	Free Transfer	
19 June 2023	FW	(Serbia) Mihailo Ivanović	(Italy) Samptdoria	End of Loan	
19 June 2023	GK	(Serbia) Nemanja Toroman	(Serbia) Kabel	End of Loan	
19 June 2023	DF	(Serbia) Branislav Milanov	(Serbia) Kabel	End of Loan	
19 June 2023	MF	(Serbia) Dragan Kokanović	(Serbia) Kabel	End of Loan	
19 June 2023	FW	(Serbia) Milan Vidakov	(Serbia) Mladost GAT	End of Loan	
19 June 2023	DF	(Serbia) Nikola Mirić	(Serbia) FAP Priboj	End of Loan	
19 June 2023	FW	(Russia) Matvey Martinkevich	(Serbia) Loznica	End of Loan	
30 June 2023	FW	(Serbia) Stefan Vukić	(Serbia) TSC	Transfer	
1 July 2023	MF	(Serbia) Siniša Tanjga	(Germany) Mainz 05	Free Transfer	
1 July 2023	DF	(Serbia) Đorđe Crnomarković	(Slovenia) Olimpija Ljubljana	Transfer	
7 July 2023	MF	(Montenegro) Andrija Radulović	(Serbia) Red Star Belgrade	Free Transfer	
29 July 2023	FW	(Democratic Republic of the Congo) Jonathan Bolingi	(Thailand) Buriram United	Transfer	
2 August 2023	DF	(Serbia) Lazar Rosić	(United Arab Emirates) Khor Fakkan Club	Transfer	
7 August 2023	DF	(Georgia (country)) Guram Giorbelidze	(Georgia (country)) Dinamo Batumi	Free Transfer	
30 August 2023	MF	(Brazil) Matheus Índio	(Portugal) Vitória Guimarães	Loan	
15 September 2023	FW	(Jamaica) Norman Campbell	(Serbia) Javor	Free Transfer	
15 September 2023	FW	(Serbia) Aleksa Vukanović	(Qatar) Umm Salal	Transfer	
Winter transfers
31 December 2023	FW	(Montenegro) Ivan Vukčević	(Serbia) Mladost GAT	End of Loan	
13 January 2024	GK	(Serbia) Dragan Rosić	(Serbia) Radnički Niš	Transfer	
13 January 2024	MF	(Montenegro) Vukan Savićević	(Turkey) Giresunspor	Free Transfer	
15 January 2024	MF	(Serbia) Njegoš Petrović	(Spain) Granada	Loan	
31 January 2024	DF	(Luxembourg) Seid Korać	(Sweden) Degerfors	Transfer	
10 February 2024	MF	(Ivory Coast) Caleb Zady Sery	(France) Caen	Free Transfer	
13 February 2024	GK	(Serbia) Matija Gočmanac	(Serbia) Mačva Šabac	Transfer	

=== Out ===
Date	Position	Name	To	Type	Ref.
28 June 2023	MF	(Serbia) Mirko Topić	(Portugal) Famalicão	Transfer	
30 June 2023	FW	(Russia) Matvey Martinkevich	(Serbia) Radnik	Free Transfer	
30 June 2023	DF	(Serbia) Branislav Milanov	(Serbia) Metalac GM	Free Transfer	
1 July 2023	FW	(Serbia) Jovan Milošević	(Germany) VfB Stuttgart	Transfer	
2 July 2023	GK	(Serbia) Nikola Simić	(Serbia) TSC	Free Transfer	
3 July 2023	FW	(Serbia) Nemanja Nikolić	(Serbia) Partizan	Free Transfer	
13 July 2023	FW	(Serbia) Milan Vidakov	(Serbia) Radnički 1923	Free Transfer	
18 July 2023	MF	(Serbia) Veljko Simić	(Cyprus) Omonia	Free Transfer	
19 July 2023	DF	(Serbia) Nemanja Ljubisavljević	(Israel) Maccabi Bnei Reineh	Transfer	
20 July 2023	DF	(Serbia) Nikola Mirić	(Serbia) Radnički Zrenjanin	Loan	
21 July 2023	DF	(Serbia) Vuk Bogdanović	(Serbia) Voždovac	Loan	
21 July 2023	MF	(Serbia) Milan Kovačev	(Serbia) Mladost GAT	Loan	
23 July 2023	MF	(Serbia) Uroš Kabić	(Serbia) Red Star Belgrade	Transfer	
30 July 2023	DF	(Serbia) Uroš Vitas	(United Arab Emirates) Emirates Club	Free Transfer	
14 August 2023	DF	(Mali) Mamadou Traoré	(Qatar) Muaither	Transfer	
22 August 2023	FW	(Montenegro) Ivan Vukčević	(Serbia) Mladost GAT	Loan	
23 August 2023	DF	(Serbia) Filip Antonijević	(Serbia) Voždovac	Loan	
25 August 2023	MF	(Senegal) Yves Baraye	(Portugal) Marítimo	Transfer	
4 September 2023	MF	(Serbia) Aleksandar Busnić	(Portugal) Vizela	Loan	
14 September 2023	FW	(Serbia) Nikola Čumić	(Russia) Rubin Kazan	Transfer	
Winter transfers
12 January 2024	DF	(Serbia) Marko Kerkez	(Serbia) Spartak Subotica	Free Transfer	
17 January 2024	MF	(Serbia) Vladimir Miletić	(Serbia) Voždovac	Free Transfer	
17 January 2024	FW	(Serbia) Stefan Vukić	(Serbia) Radnički Niš	Loan	
22 January 2024	GK	(Serbia) Ranko Puškić	(Serbia) RFK Novi Sad	Loan	
7 February 2024	DF	(Serbia) Lazar Rosić	(China) Changchun Yatai	Free Transfer	
14 February	GK	(Serbia) Matija Gočmanac	(Serbia) Mačva Šabac	Loan	
24 March 2024	MF	(Serbia) Radomir Milosavljević	(Japan) Kashima Antlers	Transfer	

== Friendlies ==
=== Summer training camp ===
5 July 2023	ASC Oțelul Galați (Romania)	2–2	Vojvodina	Lebring-Sankt Margarethen, Austria
17:30	Bodișteanu 35'; Cârjan 62'	Report	Malbašić 64'; Čumić 73'	Stadium: FC Lebring; Attendance: 30

8 July 2023	Aluminij (Slovenia)	1–1	Vojvodina	Kidričevo, Slovenia
18:00	Brest 24' (pen.)	Report	Vukčević 13'	Stadium: Aluminij Sports Park; Attendance: 150

11 July 2023	Slaven Belupo (Croatia)	1–1	Vojvodina	Slovenske Konjice, Slovenia
17:30	Hoxha 5'	Report	Zukić 41'	Stadium: Dobrava Stadium; Attendance: 50

13 July 2023	AEK Larnaca (Cyprus)	0–0	Vojvodina	Wildon, Austria
18:30		Report		Stadium: Wildon Stadium; Attendance: 20

14 July 2023	Mura (Slovenia)	1–2	Vojvodina	Murska Sobota, Slovenia
18:00	Cipot 12'	Report	Radulović 3'; Čumić 84'	Stadium: Fazanerija City Stadium; Attendance: 150

20 July 2023	Vojvodina	1–1	Borac Banja Luka (Bosnia and Herzegovina)	Novi Sad, Serbia
19:00	Čumić 54'	Report	Pejović 90'	Stadium: Karađorđe Stadium; Attendance: 650

=== Winter training camp ===
20 January 2024	Voždovac (Serbia)	1–2	Vojvodina	Larnaca, Cyprus
15:30	Pirgić 63'	Report	Ivanović 83'; Jovanović 85'	Stadium: Hotel Radisson Blu; Attendance: 50

24 January 2024	Achyronas-Onisilos (Cyprus)	1–5	Vojvodina	Sotira, Cyprus
13:00	Kutsalos 21'	Report	Sukačev 26'; Ivanović 50'; Zukić 63'; Vukanović 81'; Campbell 87'	Stadium: Sotira Municipal Stadium; Attendance: 150

28 January 2024	Ararat-Armenia	2–1	Vojvodina	Larnaca, Cyprus
16:00	Tera 48'; Duarte 75'	Report	Campbell 28'	Stadium: AEK training field Attendance: 20

4 February 2024	Vojvodina	4–3	Kabel (Serbia)	Novi Sad, Serbia
15:00		Report		Stadium: SC Vujadin Boškov; Attendance: 100

== Competitions ==
=== Overview ===
Competition	Record							
Competition	P	W	D	L	GF	GA	GD	Win %
Serbian SuperLiga	37	17	10	10	62	50	+12	45.95
Serbian Cup	5	3	1	1	8	3	+5	60.00
UEFA Europa Conference League	2	0	0	2	2	4	−2	0.00
Total	44	20	11	13	72	57	+15	45.45

=== Serbian SuperLiga ===
==== Regular season ====
===== League table =====
Pos	Team	Pld	W	D	L	GF	GA	GD	Pts	Qualification
2	Partizan	30	22	4	4	66	35	+31	70	Qualification for the Championship round
3	TSC	30	17	9	4	57	29	+28	60	Qualification for the Championship round
4	Vojvodina	30	14	8	8	49	42	+7	50	Qualification for the Championship round
5	Radnički 1923	30	16	2	12	46	46	0	50	Qualification for the Championship round
6	Čukarički	30	13	9	8	44	33	+11	48	Qualification for the Championship round

Source: SuperLiga (in Serbian)
Rules for classification: 1) Points; 2) Head-to-head points; 3) Head-to-head goal difference; 4) Head-to-head goals scored; 5) Head-to-head away goals scored (if two teams tied); 6) Goal difference; 7) Goals scored; 8) Fair play ranking; 9) Draw.

===== Results by matchday =====
Round	1	2	3	4	5	6	7	8	9	10	11	12	13	14	15	16	17	18	19	20	21	22	23	24	25	26	27	28	29	30
Ground	A	H	A	H	A	H	A	H	A	H	A	H	A	H	A	H	A	H	A	H	A	H	A	H	A	H	A	H	A	H
Result	L	L	D	W	D	W	L	W	L	W	L	W	D	D	W	L	L	W	W	D	L	D	D	W	W	W	W	D	W	W
Position	16	16	14	12	12	8	10	8	10	8	9	7	7	6	4	6	9	7	7	6	7	8	8	8	6	6	6	5	4	4

Updated to match(es) played on 14 April 2024. Source: https://www.superliga.rs/sezone/2021-22/team/5-super-liga-srbije-2021-22/15-vojvodina
A = Away; H = Home; W = Win; D = Draw; L = Loss

=== Results ===
30 July 2023 1	Red Star Belgrade	5–0	Vojvodina	Belgrade
20:00	Krasso 13' (pen.), 51'; Milosavljević 45' (o.g.); Lučić 70'; Bukari 80'	Report	Busnić (red card) 24'	Stadium: Rajko Mitić Stadium; Attendance: 16,213; Referee: (Serbia) Aleksandar Živković

6 August 2023 2	Vojvodina	0–2	Partizan	Novi Sad
19:00		Report	Saldanha 47'; Menig 74'	Stadium: Karađorđe Stadium; Attendance: 8,000; Referee: (Serbia) Miloš Milanović

13 August 2023 3	Napredak	0–0	Vojvodina	Kruševac
18:55		Report		Stadium: Mladost Stadium (Kruševac); Attendance: 1,550; Referee: (Serbia) Lazar Lukić

19 August 2023 4	Vojvodina	3–2	Radnički Niš	Novi Sad
19:00	Čumić 15', 40'; Bolingi 73'	Report	Pejović 44'; Marjanović 59'	Stadium: Karađorđe Stadium; Attendance: 2,530; Referee: (Serbia) Milan Stefanović

26 August 2023 5	Mladost Lučani	2–2	Vojvodina	Lučani
20:30	Silue 8', 44'	Report	Tomić 10' (o.g.); Radulović 37'	Stadium: Mladost Stadium (Lučani); Attendance: 320; Referee: (Serbia) Danilo Nikolić

2 September 2023 6	Vojvodina	2–1	Radnički Kragujevac	Novi Sad
21:00	Malbašić 51'; Bolingi 82' (pen.)	Report	Vidosavljević 7'	Stadium: Karađorđe Stadium; Attendance: 2,740; Referee: (Serbia) Srđan Jovanović

16 September 2023 7	Spartak	2–0	Vojvodina	Subotica
20:15	Vidaković 14'; Ubiparip 56'	Report		Stadium: Subotica City Stadium; Attendance: 1,250; Referee: (Serbia) Milan Mitić

23 September 2023 8	Vojvodina	2–1	Javor	Novi Sad
19:00	Vukić 90+4'; Kajević 90+9' (pen.)	Report	Tanko 30'	Stadium: Karađorđe Stadium; Attendance: 1,500; Referee: (Serbia) Marko Ivković

21 December 2023 9	Voždovac	3–2	Vojvodina	Belgrade
19:00	Teodorović 27'; Flemmings 43', 75'	Report	Vukanović 18'; Giorbelidze (red card) 59'; Matić 90+1' (o.g.)	Stadium: Voždovac Stadium; Attendance: 450; Referee: (Serbia) Miloš Milanović
Note: Game was originally scheduled on 27 September, but was postponed to 21 December due to mourning day and security concerns after Banjska attack on 24 September.

29 September 2023 10	Vojvodina	2–1	IMT	Novi Sad
18:30	Ivanović 12', 73'	Report	M. Luković 41'	Stadium: Karađorđe Stadium; Attendance: 2,380; Referee: (Serbia) Momčilo Marković

7 October 2023 11	Novi Pazar	3–1	Vojvodina	Novi Pazar
16:00	Floro 56'; Karaklajić 77'; Adeshina 85'	Report	Vukanović 82'	Stadium: Novi Pazar City Stadium; Attendance: 5,570; Referee: (Serbia) Srđan Jovanović

22 October 2023 12	Vojvodina	3–0	Radnik	Novi Sad
18:00	Campbell 8'; Vukanović 11'; Milosavljević 45+2'	Report		Stadium: Karađorđe Stadium; Attendance: 2,400; Referee: (Serbia) Stanko Ostraćanin

29 October 2023 13	Čukarički	2–2	Vojvodina	Belgrade
16:30	Kovač 36'; Singh 85'	Report	Zukić 13'; Vukanović 16'	Stadium: Čukarički Stadium; Attendance: 400; Referee: (Serbia) Lazar Lukić

5 November 2023 14	Vojvodina	2–2	Železničar Pančevo	Novi Sad
15:00	Milosavljević 12'; Vukanović 14'	Report	Šušnjar 63'; Lakićević 76'	Stadium: Karađorđe Stadium; Attendance: 750; Referee: (Serbia) Novak Simović

15 November 2023 15	TSC	1–2	Vojvodina	Bačka Topola
19:30	Ćirković 1'	Report	Radulović 19', 29'	Stadium: TSC Arena; Attendance: 2,537; Referee: (Serbia) Milan Stefanović

25 November 2023 16	Vojvodina	1–2	Red Star Belgrade	Novi Sad
16:00	Milosavljević 13'; Tanjga (red card) 88'	Report	Bukari 3', 27'	Stadium: Karađorđe Stadium; Attendance: 8,700; Referee: (Serbia) Milan Ilić

2 December 2023 17	Partizan	3–1	Vojvodina	Belgrade
15:30	Kanouté 56'; Zahid 88'; Saldanha 90+5' (pen.)	Report	Nikolić 67'	Stadium: Partizan Stadium; Attendance: 2,380; Referee: (Serbia) Miloš Milanović

11 December 2023 18	Vojvodina	2–0	Napredak	Novi Sad
18:30	Lazarević 35'; Radulović 45+1'	Report		Stadium: Karađorđe Stadium; Attendance: 350; Referee: (Serbia) Andrija Stojanović

16 December 2023 19	Radnički Niš	0–1	Vojvodina	Niš
14:00		Report	Matheus 49'	Stadium: Čair Stadium; Attendance: 1,000; Referee: (Serbia) Milan Stefanović

10 February 2024 20	Vojvodina	1–1	Mladost Lučani	Novi Sad
15:00	Radulović 83' (pen.)	Report	Eze 90+5'	Stadium: Karađorđe Stadium; Attendance: 3,520; Referee: (Serbia) Milan Stefanović

18 February 2024 21	Radnički 1923	2–1	Vojvodina	Kragujevac
13:00	Sahli 19'; Ristić 85' (pen.)	Report	Zukić 64'	Stadium: Čika Dača Stadium; Attendance: 4,000; Referee: (Serbia) Lazar Lukić

25 February 2024 22	Vojvodina	0–0	Spartak	Novi Sad
18:30		Report		Stadium: Karađorđe Stadium; Attendance: 3,000; Referee: (Serbia) Predrag Janjuš

2 March 2024 23	Javor	2–2	Vojvodina	Ivanjica
14:00	Bosić 66'; Mićić 73'	Report	Zady 64'; Radulović 56'	Stadium: Javor Stadium; Attendance: 900; Referee: (Serbia) Dejan Trifković

8 March 2024 24	Vojvodina	2–1	Voždovac	Novi Sad
18:30	Matheus 83'; Jovanović 90+6'	Report	Flemmings 22' (pen.); Pirgić (red card) 78'	Stadium: Karađorđe Stadium; Attendance: 2,141; Referee: (Serbia) Stanko Ostraćanin

12 March 2024 25	IMT	1–3	Vojvodina	Belgrade
20:00	Luković 83'	Report	Lambulić 11' (o.g.); Zady 60', 90+3'	Stadium: Voždovac Stadium; Attendance: 350; Referee: (Serbia) Aleksandar Živković

16 March 2024 26	Vojvodina	1–0	Novi Pazar	Novi Sad
20:00	Petrović 85'	Report		Stadium: Karađorđe Stadium; Attendance: 3,000; Referee: (Serbia) Momčilo Marković

29 March 2024 27	Radnik	0–4	Vojvodina	Surdulica
16:00		Report	Petrović 6'; Ivanović 30', 61'; Vukanović 39'	Stadium: Efbet Stadium; Attendance: 534; Referee: (Serbia) Milan Stefanović

2 April 2024 28	Vojvodina	1–1	Čukarički	Novi Sad
18:30	Ivanović 16'	Report	Miladinović 25'	Stadium: Karađorđe Stadium; Attendance: 3,700; Referee: (Serbia) Aleksandar Živković

6 April 2024 29	Železničar	0–3	Vojvodina	Pančevo
18:00		Report	Ivanović 10', 60'; Zukić 23' (pen.)	Stadium: SC Mladost Stadium; Attendance: 2,000; Referee: (Serbia) Danilo Nikolić

14 April 2024 30	Vojvodina	3–2	TSC	Novi Sad
16:30	Zukić 9'; Campbell 44'; Petrović 90+5'	Report	Đakovac 49'; Jovanović 79'	Stadium: Karađorđe Stadium; Attendance: 5,500; Referee: (Serbia) Milan Stefanović

==== Championship round league table ====
Pos	Team	Pld	W	D	L	GF	GA	GD	Pts	Qualification	RSB	PAR	TSC	VOJ	RDK	CUK	MLA	NAP
2	Partizan	37	24	6	7	80	48	+32	78	Qualification for the Champions League second qualifying round			1–2	2–3	2–2		3–0	
3	TSC	37	22	9	6	75	39	+36	75	Qualification for the Europa League play-off round (Note: The winner of the 2023–24 Serbian Cup, Red Star Belgrade, has already qualified for 2024–25 UEFA Champions League, so the berth is awarded to third place TSC.)				3–2	4–3	2–0		6–0
4	Vojvodina	37	17	10	10	62	50	+12	61	Qualification for the Europa League second qualifying round	0–0					2–3	1–0	5–0
5	Radnički 1923	37	19	4	14	64	61	+3	61	Qualification for the Conference League second qualifying round				0–0		4–3	3–2	
6	Čukarički	37	16	9	12	57	47	+10	57			0–1					4–1	2–0

Source: SuperLiga (in Serbian)
Legend: Blue = home team win; Yellow = draw; Red = away team win.
Rules for classification: 1) Points; 2) Points in regular season; 3) Head-to-head points in regular season; 4) Head-to-head goal difference in regular season; 5) Head-to-head goals scored in regular season; 6) Head-to-head away goals scored in regular season (if two teams tied); 7) Goal difference; 8) Goals scored; 9) Fair play ranking; 10) Drawing of lots.

==== Championship round result round by round ====
Round	1	2	3	4	5	6	7
Ground	A	H	A	H	H	A	H
Result	L	D	W	L	W	D	W
Position	5	5	5	6	5	5	4

Updated to match(es) played on 26 May 2024. Source: https://www.superliga.rs/sezone/2023-24/team/5-super-liga-srbije-2023-24/15-vojvodina
A = Away; H = Home; W = Win; D = Draw; L = Loss

==== Championship round matches ====
20 April 2024 31	TSC	3–2	Vojvodina	Bačka Topola
15:00	Pantović 3', 74'; Ćirković 5'	Report	Zukić 13'; Ivanović 61'	Stadium: TSC Arena; Attendance: 2,500; Referee: (Serbia) Marko Ivković

28 April 2024 32	Vojvodina	0–0	Red Star Belgrade	Novi Sad
17:30		Report		Stadium: Karađorđe Stadium; Attendance: 9,635; Referee: (Serbia) Novak Simović

2 May 2024 33	Partizan	2–3	Vojvodina	Belgrade
16:55	Crnomarković 19' (o.g.); Stojković 58'	Report	Zady 38'; Zukić 44'; Petrović 90+4'	Stadium: Partizan Stadium; Attendance: 2,000; Referee: (Serbia) Srđan Jovanović

8 May 2024 34	Vojvodina	2–3	Čukarički	Novi Sad
18:00	Zukić 79'; Vukanović 90+5'	Report	Nikčević 11'; Đ.Ivanović 43'; Miladinović 59'	Stadium: Karađorđe Stadium; Attendance: 2,800; Referee: (Serbia) Momčilo Marković

12 May 2024 35	Vojvodina	5–0	Napredak	Novi Sad
19:30	Ivanović 14'; Radulović 31'; Korać 39'; Savićević 45+2'; Zukić 57'	Report		Stadium: Karađorđe Stadium; Attendance: 2,200; Referee: (Serbia) Srđan Jovanović

16 May 2024 36	Radnički 1923	0–0	Vojvodina	Kragujevac
16:55		Report		Stadium: Čika Dača Stadium; Attendance: 4,500; Referee: (Serbia) Miloš Milanović

25 May 2024 37	Vojvodina	1–0	Mladost Lučani	Novi Sad
19:00	Nikolić 38'	Report		Stadium: Karađorđe Stadium; Attendance: 3,600; Referee: (Serbia) Milan Stefanović

=== Serbian Cup ===
1 November 2023 Round of 32	RFK Novi Sad	0–2	Vojvodina	Novi Sad
19:00		Report	Zukić 78'; Vukanović 82'	Stadium: Karađorđe Stadium; Attendance: 9,000; Referee: (Serbia) David Matić

6 December 2023 Round of 16	Mladost GAT	0–3	Vojvodina	Novi Sad
18:00		Report	Miletić 40'; Zukić 44'; Vukić 83'	Stadium: Karađorđe Stadium; Attendance: 1,200; Referee: (Serbia) Jovan Šegrt

10 April 2024 Quarter-finals	Čukarički	1–1 (3–4 p)	Vojvodina	Belgrade
17:00	Ivanović 67'	Report	Savićević 50'	Stadium: Čukarički Stadium; Attendance: 540; Referee: (Serbia) Pavle Ilić
	Penalties
	Milojević (penalty missed); Ivanović (penalty scored); Vinicius Mello (penalty scored); Ergelaš (penalty scored); Jovanović (penalty missed)		(penalty scored) Zukić; (penalty scored) Petrović; (penalty scored) Lazarević; (penalty scored) Savićević

24 April 2024 Semi-finals	Radnički 1923	0–1	Vojvodina	Kragujevac
16:00		Report	Korać 90+1'	Stadium: Čika Dača Stadium; Attendance: 9,726; Referee: (Serbia) Momčilo Marković

21 May 2024 Final	Red Star Belgrade	2–1	Vojvodina	Loznica
20:15	Ivanić 37'; Spajić 66'	Report	Vukanović 90+9'	Stadium: Lagator Stadium; Attendance: 7,900; Referee: (Serbia) Lazar Lukić

=== UEFA Europa Conference League ===
27 July 2023 Second qualifying round (First leg)	APOEL (Cyprus)	2–1	(Serbia) Vojvodina	Nicosia, Cyprus
19:00	Kvilitaia 32'; Dvali 65'	Report	Zukić 56'	Stadium: GSP Stadium; Attendance: 12,024; Referee: (Scotland) Donald Robertson

3 August 2023 Second qualifying round (Second leg)	Vojvodina (Serbia)	1–2	(Cyprus) APOEL	Novi Sad, Serbia
20:00	Zukić 37'	Report	Sarfo 27'; Efrem 74' (pen.)	Stadium: Karađorđe Stadium; Attendance: 6,705; Referee: (Latvia) Vitālijs Spasjoņņikovs

== Statistics ==
=== Squad statistics ===
No.	Pos	Nat	Player	Total		SuperLiga		Cup		Conference League	
No.	Pos	Nat	Player	Apps	Goals	Apps	Goals	Apps	Goals	Apps	Goals
Goalkeepers
1	GK	(Serbia) SRB	Nemanja Toroman	2	0	0	0	2	0	0	0
12	GK	(Serbia) SRB	Dragan Rosić	4	0	4	0	0	0	0	0
25	GK	(Montenegro) MNE	Lazar Carević	38	0	33	0	3	0	2	0
36	GK	(Serbia) SRB	Andrej Borak	0	0	0	0	0	0	0	0
Defenders
2	DF	(Serbia) SRB	Marko Bjeković	17	0	16	0	0	0	1	0
3	DF	(Serbia) SRB	Siniša Tanjga	2	0	1	0	1	0	0	0
4	DF	(Georgia (country)) GEO	Guram Giorbelidze	14	0	14	0	0	0	0	0
5	DF	(Serbia) SRB	Đorđe Crnomarković	40	0	34	0	4	0	2	0
6	DF	(Luxembourg) LUX	Seid Korać	19	2	16	1	3	1	0	0
8	DF	(Serbia) SRB	Stefan Đorđević	18	0	16	0	2	0	0	0
15	DF	(Serbia) SRB	Igor Jeličić	15	0	11	0	2	0	2	0
30	DF	(Serbia) SRB	Stefan Bukinac	12	0	10	0	2	0	0	0
50	DF	(Serbia) SRB	Milan Lazarević	39	1	32	1	5	0	2	0
Midfielders
10	MF	(Serbia) SRB	Dejan Zukić	44	12	37	8	5	2	2	2
14	MF	(Ivory Coast) CIV	Caleb Zady Sery	19	4	16	4	3	0	0	0
16	MF	(Montenegro) MNE	Asmir Kajević	11	1	10	1	1	0	0	0
17	MF	(Serbia) SRB	Lazar Jovanović	17	1	16	1	1	0	0	0
18	MF	(Serbia) SRB	Njegoš Petrović	20	4	17	4	3	0	0	0
20	MF	(Serbia) SRB	Uroš Nikolić	32	2	27	2	3	0	2	0
23	MF	(Brazil) BRA	Matheus Índio	25	2	23	2	2	0	0	0
26	MF	(Montenegro) MNE	Vukan Savićević	19	2	16	1	3	1	0	0
31	MF	(Serbia) SRB	Milan Kovačev	1	0	0	0	1	0	0	0
47	MF	(Serbia) SRB	Mihajlo Butraković	3	0	2	0	1	0	0	0
49	MF	(Montenegro) MNE	Andrija Radulović	39	7	33	7	4	0	2	0
Forwards
11	FW	(Serbia) SRB	Mihailo Ivanović	38	9	32	9	5	0	1	0
19	FW	(Democratic Republic of the Congo) COD	Jonathan Bolingi	6	2	6	2	0	0	0	0
28	FW	(Jamaica) JAM	Norman Campbell	27	2	23	2	4	0	0	0
29	FW	(Serbia) SRB	Filip Malbašić	23	1	20	1	2	0	1	0
92	FW	(Serbia) SRB	Aleksa Vukanović	33	9	29	7	4	2	0	0
99	FW	(Montenegro) MNE	Ivan Vukčević	4	0	2	0	0	0	2	0
Players transferred out during the season
18	DF	(Serbia) SRB	Filip Antonijević	1	0	0	0	0	0	1	0
6	DF	(Mali) MLI	Mamadou Traoré	3	0	1	0	0	0	2	0
77	MF	(Senegal) SEN	Yves Baraye	2	0	0	0	0	0	2	0
22	MF	(Serbia) SRB	Aleksandar Busnić	4	0	3	0	0	0	1	0
24	FW	(Serbia) SRB	Nikola Čumić	8	2	6	2	0	0	2	0
37	GK	(Serbia) SRB	Ranko Puškić	0	0	0	0	0	0	0	0
33	DF	(Serbia) SRB	Lazar Rosić	17	0	15	0	2	0	0	0
14	MF	(Serbia) SRB	Vladimir Miletić	6	1	3	0	2	1	1	0
9	FW	(Serbia) SRB	Stefan Vukić	14	1	11	0	1	1	2	0
7	MF	(Serbia) SRB	Radomir Milosavljević	25	4	22	4	1	0	2	0

Last updated: 26 May 2024
Source: Competitions

=== Goal scorers ===
Rank	No.	Pos	Nat	Name	SuperLiga	Serbian Cup	Europe	Total
1	10	MF	(Serbia)	Dejan Zukić	8	2	2	12
2	11	FW	(Serbia)	Mihailo Ivanović	9	0	0	9
2	92	MF	(Serbia)	Aleksa Vukanović	7	2	0	9
3	49	MF	(Montenegro)	Andrija Radulović	7	0	0	7
4	14	MF	(Ivory Coast)	Caleb Zady Sery	4	0	0	4
4	18	MF	(Serbia)	Njegoš Petrović	4	0	0	4
4	7	MF	(Serbia)	Radomir Milosavljević	4	0	0	4
5	-	-	-	Own goal	3	0	0	3
6	19	FW	(Democratic Republic of the Congo)	Jonathan Bolingi	2	0	0	2
6	23	MF	(Brazil)	Matheus Índio	2	0	0	2
6	28	FW	(Jamaica)	Norman Campbell	2	0	0	2
6	20	MF	(Serbia)	Uroš Nikolić	2	0	0	2
6	26	MF	(Montenegro)	Vukan Savićević	1	1	0	2
6	6	DF	(Luxembourg)	Seid Korać	1	1	0	2
6	24	FW	(Serbia)	Nikola Čumić	2	0	0	2
7	29	FW	(Serbia)	Filip Malbašić	1	0	0	1
7	16	MF	(Montenegro)	Asmir Kajević	1	0	0	1
7	50	DF	(Serbia)	Milan Lazarević	1	0	0	1
7	17	MF	(Serbia)	Lazar Jovanović	1	0	0	1
7	14	MF	(Serbia)	Vladimir Miletić	0	1	0	1
7	9	FW	(Serbia)	Stefan Vukić	0	1	0	1
Totals					62	8	2	72

Last updated: 26 May 2024

=== Clean sheets ===
Rank	No.	Pos	Nat	Name	SuperLiga	Serbian Cup	Europe	Total
1	25	GK	(Montenegro)	Lazar Carević	11	1	0	12
2	1	GK	(Serbia)	Nemanja Toroman	0	2	0	2
3	12	GK	(Serbia)	Dragan Rosić	1	0	0	1
Totals					12	3	0	15

Last updated: 26 May 2024

=== Disciplinary record ===
Number	Nation	Position	Name	SuperLiga		Serbian Cup		Europe		Total	
Number	Nation	Position	Name	Booked	Sent off (straight red)	Booked	Sent off (straight red)	Booked	Sent off (straight red)	Booked	Sent off (straight red)
2	(Serbia)	DF	Marko Bjeković	2	0	0	0	0	0	2	0
3	(Serbia)	DF	Siniša Tanjga	0	1	0	0	0	0	0	1
4	(Georgia (country))	DF	Guram Giorbelidze	1	1	0	0	0	0	1	1
5	(Serbia)	DF	Đorđe Crnomarković	9	0	2	0	0	0	11	0
6	(Luxembourg)	DF	Seid Korać	2	0	1	0	0	0	3	0
6	(Mali)	DF	Mamadou Traoré	0	0	0	0	1	0	1	0
7	(Serbia)	MF	Radomir Milosavljević	7	0	0	0	0	0	7	0
8	(Serbia)	DF	Stefan Đorđević	2	0	0	0	0	0	2	0
10	(Serbia)	MF	Dejan Zukić	3	0	1	0	1	0	5	0
11	(Serbia)	FW	Mihailo Ivanović	2	0	0	0	0	0	2	0
12	(Serbia)	GK	Dragan Rosić	2	0	0	0	0	0	2	0
14	(Ivory Coast)	MF	Caleb Zady Sery	5	0	0	0	0	0	5	0
15	(Serbia)	DF	Igor Jeličić	3	0	0	0	0	0	3	0
17	(Serbia)	MF	Lazar Jovanović	1	0	0	0	0	0	1	0
18	(Serbia)	MF	Njegoš Petrović	5	0	0	0	0	0	5	0
19	(Democratic Republic of the Congo)	FW	Jonathan Bolingi	1	0	0	0	0	0	1	0
22	(Serbia)	MF	Aleksandar Busnić	0	1	0	0	0	0	0	1
24	(Serbia)	FW	Nikola Čumić	1	0	0	0	1	0	2	0
25	(Montenegro)	GK	Lazar Carević	1	0	0	0	0	0	1	0
26	(Montenegro)	MF	Vukan Savićević	1	0	1	0	0	0	2	0
28	(Jamaica)	FW	Norman Campbell	2	0	0	0	0	0	2	0
29	(Serbia)	FW	Filip Malbašić	2	0	0	0	0	0	2	0
30	(Serbia)	DF	Stefan Bukinac	7	0	0	0	0	0	7	0
33	(Serbia)	DF	Lazar Rosić	3	0	0	0	0	0	3	0
49	(Montenegro)	MF	Andrija Radulović	2	0	0	0	0	0	2	0
50	(Serbia)	DF	Milan Lazarević	7	0	0	0	1	0	8	0
77	(Senegal)	MF	Yves Baraye	0	0	0	0	1	0	1	0
92	(Serbia)	FW	Aleksa Vukanović	4	0	2	0	0	0	6	0
99	(Montenegro)	FW	Ivan Vukčević	2	0	0	0	1	0	3	0
			TOTALS	77	3	7	0	6	0	90	3

Last updated: 26 May 2024

=== Game as captain ===
Rank	No.	Pos	Nat	Name	SuperLiga	Serbian Cup	Europe	Total
1	10	MF	(Serbia)	Dejan Zukić	14	3	0	17
2	29	FW	(Serbia)	Filip Malbašić	13	1	0	14
3	24	FW	(Serbia)	Nikola Čumić	5	0	2	7
4	15	DF	(Serbia)	Igor Jeličić	2	0	0	2
4	92	FW	(Serbia)	Aleksa Vukanović	2	0	0	2
4	33	DF	(Serbia)	Lazar Rosić	1	1	0	2
Totals					37	5	2	44

Last updated: 26 May 2024

=== Attendances ===
	Matches	Attendances	Average	High	Low
SuperLiga	19	68,446	3,602	9,635	350
Serbian Cup	0	–	–	–	–
Conference League	1	6,705	6,705	6,705	6,705
Total	20	75,151	3,758	9,635	350

Last updated: 26 May 2024
