= 2022–23 FK Vojvodina season =

FK Vojvodina
2022–23 season
- President: Dragoljub Zbiljić
- Head coach: Milan Rastavac (until 25 February); Radoslav Batak (from 26 February)
- Stadium: Karađorđe Stadium
- Serbian SuperLiga: 5th
- Serbian Cup: Semi-finals
- Top goalscorer: League: Nikola Čumić (13); All: Nikola Čumić (14)
- Highest home attendance: 9,300 vs Red Star (20 October 2022)
- Lowest home attendance: 1,000 vs Radnik (24 February 2023)
- Average home league attendance: 3,853
Home colours	Away colours
- All statistics correct as of 28 May 2023.

The 2022–23 season was Vojvodina's 108th season in existence and the club's 17th competing in the Serbian SuperLiga.

== Transfers ==
=== In ===
Date	Position	Name	From	Type	Ref.
31 May 2022	FW	(Serbia) Milan Vidakov	(Serbia) Mladost GAT	End of Loan	
1 June 2022	GK	(Serbia) Nemanja Toroman	(Serbia) OFK Bačka	End of Loan	
1 June 2022	DF	(Serbia) Veljko Jelenković	(Serbia) Kabel	End of Loan	
1 June 2022	FW	(Serbia) Vukašin Bogdanović	(Serbia) OFK Bačka	End of Loan	
8 June 2022	MF	(Serbia) Radomir Milosavljević	(Serbia) Mladost Lučani	Free transfer	
12 June 2022	MF	(Senegal) Yves Baraye	(Portugal) Belenenses	Free transfer	
15 June 2022	FW	(Serbia) Nemanja Nikolić	(Serbia) Spartak Subotica	Free transfer	
15 June 2022	MF	(Serbia) Uroš Nikolić	Free Agent	Free transfer	
18 June 2022	GK	(Montenegro) Lazar Carević	(Spain) Barcelona B	Transfer	
24 June 2022	DF	(Mali) Mamadou Traoré	(Portugal) Estrela da Amadora	Transfer	
26 July 2022	FW	(Serbia) Filip Malbašić	(Spain) Burgos	Transfer	
1 September 2022	FW	(Serbia) Nikola Čumić	(Greece) Olympiacos	Transfer	
2 September 2022	DF	(Serbia) Filip Antonijević	(Serbia) Metalac GM	Free transfer	
9 September 2022	DF	(Serbia) Uroš Vitas	(Saudi Arabia) Al Qadsiah	Transfer	
Winter transfers
11 January 2023	DF	(Serbia) Vuk Bogdanović	(Serbia) Red Star	Transfer	
24 January 2023	DF	(Serbia) Nemanja Ljubisavljević	(Lithuania) Žalgiris	Free Transfer	

=== Out ===
Date	Position	Name	To	Type	Ref.
1 June 2022	GK	(Serbia) Emil Rockov	(Hungary) Fehérvár	End of Loan	
8 June 2022	FW	(Bosnia and Herzegovina) Momčilo Mrkaić	(Bosnia and Herzegovina) Borac Banja Luka	Free Transfer	
22 June 2022	MF	(Serbia) Novica Maksimović	(Serbia) Mladost GAT	Free Transfer	
30 June 2022	DF	(Serbia) Vladimir Kovačević	(Serbia) Mladost GAT	Free Transfer	
1 July 2022	FW	(Serbia) Vukašin Bogdanović	(Serbia) Radnik	Free Transfer	
1 July 2022	GK	(Bosnia and Herzegovina) Goran Vukliš	Free Agent	End of Contract	
5 July 2022	MF	(Serbia) Miljan Vukadinović	(Kazakhstan) Tobol	Free Transfer	
29 July 2022	FW	(Serbia) Nebojša Bastajić	(Serbia) Napredak	Transfer	
3 August 2022	DF	(Serbia) Mladen Devetak	(Italy) Palermo	Transfer	
7 August 2022	FW	(Serbia) Mihailo Ivanović	(Italy) Samptdoria	Loan	
10 August 2022	GK	(Serbia) Nemanja Toroman	(Serbia) Kabel	Loan	
10 August 2022	DF	(Serbia) Branislav Milanov	(Serbia) Kabel	Loan	
10 August 2022	MF	(Croatia) Dragan Kokanović	(Serbia) Kabel	Loan	
11 August 2022	FW	(Serbia) Bojan Matić	(Serbia) Napredak	Free Transfer	
17 August 2022	DF	(Serbia) Milan Majstorović	(Russia) Dynamo Moscow	Transfer	
6 September 2022	DF	(Serbia) Dušan Stevanović	(Serbia) Radnik	Free Transfer	
8 September 2022	FW	(Serbia) Milan Vidakov	(Serbia) Mladost GAT	Loan	
13 September 2022	MF	(Serbia) Mihajlo Nešković	(Serbia) Voždovac	Transfer	
16 September 2022	DF	(Montenegro) Boris Kopitović	(Serbia) Javor	Transfer	
Winter transfers
24 December 2022	MF	(North Macedonia) Vladan Novevski	(Serbia) Voždovac	Transfer	
8 January 2023	DF	(Serbia) Veljko Jelenković	(Bulgaria) Slavia Sofia	Free Transfer	

== Friendlies ==
=== Summer training camp ===
20 June 2022	Borac Banja Luka (Bosnia and Herzegovina)	0–1	Vojvodina	Slovenske Konjice, Slovenia
18:00		Report	Vidakov 60'	Stadium: Dobrava Stadium; Attendance: 30

22 June 2022	Maritsa Plovdiv (Bulgaria)	0–3	Vojvodina	Stojnci, Slovenia
17:30		Report	Bastajić 13'; Milošević 29' (pen.); Nešković 71'	Stadium: Stojnci Sports Park; Attendance: 30

26 June 2022	Koper (Slovenia)	0–0	Vojvodina	Slovenske Konjice, Slovenia
18:00		Report		Stadium: Dobrava Stadium; Attendance: 120

27 June 2022	UTA Arad (Romania)	1–2	Vojvodina	Stojnci, Slovenia
18:00	Negoescu 68'	Report	Milosavljević 33'; Bastajić 40'	Stadium: Stojnci Sports Park; Attendance: 20

30 June 2022	Mura (Slovenia)	1–1	Vojvodina	Bakovci, Slovenia
18:00	Cipot 44'	Report	Simić 64'	Stadium: ŠNK Bakovci; Attendance: 150

17 July 2022	Vojvodina	5–1	OFK Bačka (Serbia)	Novi Sad, Serbia
10:00	Vidakov 34'; Leđanac 41' (o.g.); Zukić 73'; Martinkevich 86'; Matić 90+1'	Report	Balabanović 24'	Stadium: SC Vujadin Boškov; Attendance: 50

=== Winter training camp ===
20 November 2022	UTA Arad (Romania)	2–1	Vojvodina	Arad, Romania
14:00	Godwin 54'; Batha 61' (pen.)	Report	Topić 82'	Stadium: Francisc von Neuman Stadium; Attendance: 120

14 January 2023	Paksi (Hungary)	1–2	Vojvodina	Belek, Turkey
13:00	Varga 32'	Report	Kabić 7'; Miletić 25'	Stadium: FC Titanic Deluxe Golf; Attendance: 50

18 January 2023	Sabah (Azerbaijan)	4–2	Vojvodina	Belek, Turkey
15:00	Volkovi 4', 22'; Mickels 46'; Kashchuk 62'	Report	Simić 6', 10'	Stadium: FC Titanic Deluxe Golf; Attendance: 50

19 January 2023	Khimki (Russia)	0–0	Vojvodina	Belek, Turkey
15:00		Report		Stadium: FC Titanic Deluxe Golf; Attendance: 80

22 January 2023	Lokomotiv 1929 Sofia (Bulgaria)	0–2	Vojvodina	Belek, Turkey
14:00		Report	Antonijević 48'; Vukčević 72'	Stadium: FC Titanic Deluxe Golf; Attendance: 100

23 January 2023	Akhmat Grozny (Russia)	1–1	Vojvodina	Belek, Turkey
15:00	Šatara 12'	Report	Jeličić 75'	Stadium: SC Sueno; Attendance: 50

26 January 2023	Shakhter Karagandy (Kazakhstan)	1–2	Vojvodina	Belek, Turkey
15:30	Tutkyshev 46'	Report	Čumić 4'; Milošević 25'	Stadium: FC Miracle; Attendance: 40

25 March 2023	Vojvodina	2–0	Spartak (Serbia)	Novi Sad, Serbia
13:00		Report	Baraye 32'; Vukčević 59'	Stadium: FC Vujadin Boškov; Attendance: 250

== Competitions ==
=== Overview ===
Competition	Record							
Competition	P	W	D	L	GF	GA	GD	Win %
Serbian SuperLiga	37	16	15	6	59	35	+24	43.24
Serbian Cup	4	2	1	1	4	3	+1	50.00
Total	41	18	16	7	63	38	+25	43.90

=== Serbian SuperLiga ===
==== Regular season ====
===== League table =====
Pos	Team	Pld	W	D	L	GF	GA	GD	Pts	Qualification (Note: Teams will be split into two groups (Final A and Final B) after each have played 30 matches.)
3	Čukarički	30	19	5	6	56	31	+25	62	Qualification for the Championship round
4	Partizan	30	17	6	7	57	28	+29	57	Qualification for the Championship round
5	Vojvodina	30	14	12	4	47	27	+20	54	Qualification for the Championship round
6	Novi Pazar	30	15	5	10	37	31	+6	50	Qualification for the Championship round
7	Voždovac	30	11	6	13	24	42	−18	39	Qualification for the Championship round

Source: SuperLiga (in Serbian)
Rules for classification: 1) Points; 2) Head-to-head points; 3) Head-to-head goal difference; 4) Head-to-head goals scored; 5) Head-to-head away goals scored (if two teams tied); 6) Goal difference; 7) Goals scored; 8) Fair play ranking; 9) Draw.

===== Results by matchday =====
Round	1	2	3	4	5	6	7	8	9	10	11	12	13	14	15	16	17	18	19	20	21	22	23	24	25	26	27	28	29	30
Ground	H	A	H	A	H	A	H	A	H	H	A	H	A	H	A	A	H	A	H	A	H	A	H	A	A	H	A	H	A	H
Result	W	W	D	W	L	D	D	D	W	W	L	W	L	L	D	W	W	D	W	D	W	D	D	W	D	W	D	W	D	W
Position	5	2	2	2	3	3	4	6	5	3	7	5	7	7	6	6	5	6	5	5	5	5	6	5	6	5	5	5	5	5

Updated to match(es) played on 11 April 2023. Source: https://www.superliga.rs/sezone/2022-23/team/5-super-liga-srbije-2022-23/15-vojvodina
A = Away; H = Home; W = Win; D = Draw; L = Loss

=== Results ===
10 July 2022 1	Vojvodina	1–0	Napredak	Novi Sad
20:00	Simić 55'	Report		Stadium: Karađorđe Stadium; Attendance: 4,450; Referee: (Serbia) Stanko Ostraćanin

16 July 2022 2	Mladost GAT	0–4	Vojvodina	Novi Sad
20:00		Report	Milosavljević 42'; Baraye 47'; N.Nikolić 59'; Simić 86'	Stadium: Karađorđe Stadium; Attendance: 4,800; Referee: (Serbia) Lazar Lukić

24 July 2022 3	Vojvodina	0–0	Spartak	Novi Sad
21:00		Report		Stadium: Karađorđe Stadium; Attendance: 5,800; Referee: (Serbia) Novak Simović

30 July 2022 4	Radnički Kragujevac	0–2	Vojvodina	Kragujevac
17:30		Report	Simić 62'; Malbašić 85'	Stadium: Čika Dača Stadium; Attendance: 250; Referee: (Serbia) Srđan Jovanović

20 October 2022 5	Vojvodina	0–2	Red Star Belgrade	Novi Sad
18:55		Report	Pešić 52'; Kanga 62' (pen.)	Stadium: Karađorđe Stadium; Attendance: 9,300; Referee: (Serbia) Miloš Milanović
Note: This match was originally scheduled to be played on 6 August, but was rescheduled due to Red Star's European qualifications matches.

13 August 2022 6	Kolubara	2–2	Vojvodina	Lazarevac
19:00	Milojević 27' (pen.); Marjanović 79'	Report	Simić 57'; N.Nikolić 71'	Stadium: Kolubara Stadium; Attendance: 1,000; Referee: (Serbia) Aleksandar Živković

20 August 2022 7	Vojvodina	1–1	Mladost Lučani	Novi Sad
17:55	Simić (red card) 44'; N.Nikolić 55' (pen.)	Report	Bojović 68'	Stadium: Karađorđe Stadium; Attendance: 2,700; Referee: (Serbia) Pavle Tomić

25 August 2022 8	Radnik	1–1	Vojvodina	Surdulica
18:00	Spasić 21'	Report	Busnić 49'	Stadium: Surdulica City Stadium; Attendance: 1,000; Referee: (Serbia) Marko Ivković

30 August 2022 9	Vojvodina	3–0	Radnički Niš	Novi Sad
18:30	Baraye 22'; Simić 51'; U.Nikolić 82'	Report		Stadium: Karađorđe Stadium; Attendance: 3,400; Referee: (Serbia) Milan Stefanović

4 September 2022 10	Vojvodina	2–1	Voždovac	Novi Sad
18:00	Čumić 60', 90+2'	Report	Burmaz 69'	Stadium: Karađorđe Stadium; Attendance: 3,800; Referee: (Serbia) Miloš Milanović

11 September 2022 11	Čukarički	2–0	Vojvodina	Belgrade
19:00	Badamosi 23', 30'	Report	Miletić (red card) 56'	Stadium: Čukarički Stadium; Attendance: 1,000; Referee: (Serbia) Milan Mitić

18 September 2022 12	Vojvodina	2–0	Javor Matis	Novi Sad
17:00	Đukić 24' (o.g.); Baraye 81'	Report		Stadium: Karađorđe Stadium; Attendance: 3,200; Referee: (Serbia) Milan Mitić

2 October 2022 13	Partizan	4–1	Vojvodina	Belgrade
19:00	Natcho 16', 23' (pen.); Filipović 61'; Baždar 84'	Report	U.Nikolić 83'	Stadium: Partizan Stadium; Attendance: 8,000; Referee: (Serbia) Milan Mitić

8 October 2022 14	Vojvodina	1–2	TSC	Novi Sad
19:00	Čumić 28'	Report	Ilić 32', 44'	Stadium: Karađorđe Stadium; Attendance: 6,100; Referee: (Serbia) Nenad Minaković

14 October 2022 15	Novi Pazar	1–1	Vojvodina	Novi Pazar
17:00	Nikčević 10' (pen.)	Report	Busnić 60'	Stadium: Novi Pazar City Stadium; Attendance: 6,048; Referee: (Serbia) Srđan Jovanović

24 October 2022 16	Napredak	0–2	Vojvodina	Kruševac
20:00		Report	Čumić 19'; Malbašić 61'	Stadium: Mladost Stadium; Attendance: 2,400; Referee: (Serbia) Lazar Lukić

29 October 2022 17	Vojvodina	2–0	Mladost GAT	Novi Sad
20:00	Čumić 20'; Kabić 80'	Report		Stadium: Karađorđe Stadium; Attendance: 3,000; Referee: (Serbia) Nikola Radaković

5 November 2022 18	Spartak	1–1	Vojvodina	Subotica
18:00	Srećković 49'	Report	Čumić 74'	Stadium: Subotica City Stadium; Attendance: 850; Referee: (Serbia) Lazar Lukić

12 November 2022 19	Vojvodina	2–1	Radnički Kragujevac	Novi Sad
19:00	Ponjević 48' (o.g.); Simić 55'	Report	Vidović 78'	Stadium: Karađorđe Stadium; Attendance: 1,600; Referee: (Serbia) Milan Stefanović

4 February 2023 20	Red Star Belgrade	1–1	Vojvodina	Belgrade
16:00	Katai 28'	Report	Kabić 25'	Stadium: Red Star Stadium; Attendance: 20,118; Referee: (Serbia) Aleksandar Živković

11 February 2023 21	Vojvodina	3–0	Kolubara	Novi Sad
16:00	Simić 46'; Čumić 65' (pen.); Malbašić 73'	Report		Stadium: Karađorđe Stadium; Attendance: 2,000; Referee: (Serbia) Milan Ilić

17 February 2023 22	Mladost Lučani	1–1	Vojvodina	Lučani
16:00	Mirić 78'	Report	Traoré 34'	Stadium: Mladost Stadium; Attendance: 300; Referee: (Serbia) Milan Mitić

24 February 2023 23	Vojvodina	1–1	Radnik	Novi Sad
16:00	Čumić 19'	Report	Danoski 3'	Stadium: Karađorđe Stadium; Attendance: 1,000; Referee: (Serbia) Miloš Milanović

28 February 2023 24	Radnički Niš	1–4	Vojvodina	Niš
16:00	Belaković 83'	Report	Malbašić 9' (pen.); Zukić 18', 58'; U.Nikolić 64'	Stadium: Čair Stadium; Attendance: 320; Referee: (Serbia) Srđan Jovanović

5 March 2023 25	Voždovac	0–0	Vojvodina	Belgrade
18:00		Report		Stadium: Voždovac Stadium; Attendance: 350; Referee: (Serbia) Jovan Šegrt

11 March 2023 26	Vojvodina	3–2	Čukarički	Novi Sad
16:00	Zukić 5'; U.Nikolić 14'; Lazarević 82'	Report	Tošić 66'; Pankov 72'	Stadium: Karađorđe Stadium; Attendance: 4,000; Referee: (Serbia) Dejan Trifković

18 March 2023 27	Javor Matis	1–1	Vojvodina	Ivanjica
16:00	Gigić 77'	Report	U.Nikolić 39'	Stadium: Javor Stadium; Attendance: 328; Referee: (Serbia) Aleksandar Živković

1 April 2023 28	Vojvodina	2–1	Partizan	Novi Sad
20:00	Malbašić 54'; N.Nikolić 84'	Report	Pantić 90'	Stadium: Karađorđe Stadium; Attendance: 6,318; Referee: (Serbia) Srđan Jovanović

7 April 2023 29	TSC	1–1	Vojvodina	Bačka Topola
17:00	Ratkov 17'	Report	U.Nikolić 90' (pen.)	Stadium: TSC Arena; Attendance: 3,100; Referee: (Serbia) Dejan Trifković

11 April 2023 30	Vojvodina	2–0	Novi Pazar	Novi Sad
16:00	Čumić 47'; U.Nikolić 52'	Report		Stadium: Karađorđe Stadium; Attendance: 2,800; Referee: (Serbia) Marko Ivković

==== Championship round league table ====
Pos	Team	Pld	W	D	L	GF	GA	GD	Pts	Qualification	RSB	TSC	CUK	PAR	VOJ	NPZ	VOZ	RDK
3	Čukarički	37	23	6	8	65	38	+27	75	Qualification for the Europa League play-off round (Note: Awarded to third place finisher since winner of the 2022–23 Serbian Cup, Red Star Belgrade, has already qualified for 2023-24 UEFA Champions League)				1–0	1–0	4–0		2–1
4	Partizan	37	21	8	8	68	34	+34	71	Qualification for the Europa Conference League third qualifying round	0–0					2–0	2–1	2–1
5	Vojvodina	37	16	15	6	59	35	+24	63	Qualification for the Europa Conference League second qualifying round				2–2		4–0	2–0	
6	Novi Pazar	37	15	6	16	40	49	−9	51			1–4					0–1	0–1
7	Voždovac	37	13	7	17	29	52	−23	46		0–2		1–1					2–1

Source: SuperLiga (in Serbian)
Legend: Blue = home team win; Yellow = draw; Red = away team win.
Rules for classification: 1) Points; 2) Points in regular season; 3) Head-to-head points in regular season; 4) Head-to-head goal difference in regular season; 5) Head-to-head goals scored in regular season; 6) Head-to-head away goals scored in regular season (if two teams tied); 7) Goal difference; 8) Goals scored; 9) Fair play ranking; 10) Drawing of lots.

==== Championship round result round by round ====
Round	1	2	3	4	5	6	7
Ground	H	A	H	A	A	H	A
Result	W	D	W	L	L	D	D
Position	5	5	5	5	5	5	5

Updated to match(es) played on 28 May 2023. Source: https://www.superliga.rs/sezone/2022-23/team/5-super-liga-srbije-2022-23/15-vojvodina
A = Away; H = Home; W = Win; D = Draw; L = Loss

==== Championship round matches ====
12 April 2023 31	Vojvodina	4–0	Novi Pazar	Novi Sad
16:00	U.Nikolić 17' (pen.); Milošević 24'; Čumić 70'; Milosavljević 81'	Report		Stadium: Karađorđe Stadium; Attendance: 2,600; Referee: (Serbia) Pavle Tomić

26 April 2023 32	Radnički Kragujevac	2–2	Vojvodina	Kragujevac
16:00	Milunović 6'; Pecelj 54'	Report	Čumić 18'; Malbašić 88'	Stadium: Čika Dača Stadium; Attendance: 1,520; Referee: (Serbia) Jovan Šegrt

29 April 2023 33	Vojvodina	2–0	Voždovac	Novi Sad
19:00	Čumić 30'; Baraye 80'	Report		Stadium: Karađorđe Stadium; Attendance: 2,614; Referee: (Serbia) Nikola Đorđević

8 May 2023 34	Čukarički	1–0	Vojvodina	Belgrade
18:00	Docić 30' (pen.)	Report	U.Nikolić (red card) 90+2'	Stadium: Čukarički Stadium; Attendance: 800; Referee: (Serbia) Srđan Jovanović

13 May 2023 35	Red Star Belgrade	2–1	Vojvodina	Belgrade
18:30	Bukari 9'; Kangwa 90+3'	Report	Baraye 57'	Stadium: Red Star Stadium; Attendance: 8,258; Referee: (Serbia) Dejan Trifković

21 May 2023 36	Vojvodina	2–2	Partizan	Novi Sad
19:00	Milošević 21', 46'	Report	Menig 17'; Colorado 50'	Stadium: Karađorđe Stadium; Attendance: 4,682; Referee: (Serbia) Milan Mitić

28 May 2023 37	TSC	1–1	Vojvodina	Bačka Topola
17:00	L.Ilić 66' (pen.)	Report	Čumić 77'	Stadium: TSC Arena; Attendance: 3,580; Referee: (Serbia) Marko Ivković

=== Serbian Cup ===
1 November 2022 Round of 32	RFK Grafičar	1–1 (0–3 p)	Vojvodina	Belgrade
16:00	Mituljikić 48'	Report	Čumić 86'	Stadium: Stadium Rajko Mitić; Attendance: 200; Referee: (Serbia) Marko Delibašić
	Penalties
	Radojević (penalty missed); Bubanj (penalty missed); Bajić (penalty missed)		(penalty scored) U.Nikolić; (penalty scored) Zukić; (penalty scored) N.Nikolić

9 November 2022 Round of 16	Vojvodina	2–1	Mladost GAT	Novi Sad
18:30	Simić 86'; N.Nikolić 90'	Report	Arsić 15' (pen.)	Stadium: Karađorđe Stadium; Attendance: 1,200; Referee: (Serbia) Danilo Nikolić

4 May 2023 Quarter-finals	Radnički Niš	0–1	Vojvodina	Niš
18:30		Report	N.Nikolić 43'	Stadium: Čair Stadium; Attendance: 1,100; Referee: (Serbia) Miloš Milanović

18 May 2023 Semi-finals	Vojvodina	0–1	Čukarički	Novi Sad
15:00	Vitas (yellow card) 51' (yellow-red card)	Report	Adžić 71'	Stadium: Karađorđe Stadium; Attendance: 1,600; Referee: (Serbia) Srđan Jovanović

== Statistics ==
=== Squad statistics ===
No.	Pos	Nat	Player	Total		SuperLiga		Cup	
No.	Pos	Nat	Player	Apps	Goals	Apps	Goals	Apps	Goals
Goalkeepers
1	GK	(Serbia) SRB	Nikola Simić	6	0	3	0	3	0
25	GK	(Montenegro) MNE	Lazar Carević	36	0	35	0	1	0
37	GK	(Serbia) SRB	Ranko Puškić	0	0	0	0	0	0
Defenders
2	DF	(Serbia) SRB	Marko Bjeković	19	0	19	0	0	0
4	DF	(Serbia) SRB	Uroš Vitas	20	0	18	0	2	0
5	DF	(Serbia) SRB	Vuk Bogdanović	2	0	2	0	0	0
6	DF	(Mali) MLI	Mamadou Traoré	35	1	31	1	4	0
11	DF	(Serbia) SRB	Stefan Đorđević	24	0	24	0	0	0
15	DF	(Serbia) SRB	Igor Jeličić	30	0	28	0	2	0
18	DF	(Serbia) SRB	Filip Antonijević	13	0	9	0	4	0
26	DF	(Serbia) SRB	Nemanja Ljubisavljević	14	0	12	0	2	0
30	DF	(Serbia) SRB	Stefan Bukinac	0	0	0	0	0	0
50	DF	(Serbia) SRB	Milan Lazarević	32	1	29	1	3	0
Midfielders
7	MF	(Serbia) SRB	Radomir Milosavljević	29	2	26	2	3	0
8	MF	(Serbia) SRB	Mirko Topić	39	0	35	0	4	0
10	MF	(Serbia) SRB	Dejan Zukić	36	3	32	3	4	0
14	MF	(Serbia) SRB	Vladimir Miletić	12	0	12	0	0	0
20	MF	(Serbia) SRB	Uroš Nikolić	28	8	24	8	4	0
21	MF	(Serbia) SRB	Veljko Simić	37	8	34	7	3	1
22	MF	(Serbia) SRB	Aleksandar Busnić	25	2	22	2	3	0
31	MF	(Serbia) SRB	Milan Kovačev	0	0	0	0	0	0
70	MF	(Serbia) SRB	Uroš Kabić	21	2	19	2	2	0
77	MF	(Senegal) SEN	Yves Baraye	37	5	34	5	3	0
Forwards
9	FW	(Serbia) SRB	Nemanja Nikolić	35	6	31	4	4	2
24	FW	(Serbia) SRB	Nikola Čumić	33	14	29	13	4	1
29	FW	(Serbia) SRB	Filip Malbašić	32	6	29	6	3	0
90	FW	(Serbia) SRB	Jovan Milošević	20	3	18	3	2	0
99	FW	(Montenegro) MNE	Ivan Vukčević	11	0	8	0	3	0
Players transferred out during the season
44	FW	(Serbia) SRB	Nebojša Bastajić	3	0	3	0	0	0
27	FW	(Serbia) SRB	Milan Vidakov	4	0	4	0	0	0
17	MF	(Serbia) SRB	Mihajlo Nešković	7	0	7	0	0	0
12	DF	(Montenegro) MNE	Boris Kopitović	1	0	1	0	0	0
19	MF	(North Macedonia) MKD	Vladan Novevski	0	0	0	0	0	0
23	DF	(Serbia) SRB	Veljko Jelenković	0	0	0	0	0	0

Last updated: 28 May 2023
Source: Competitions

=== Goal scorers ===
Rank	No.	Pos	Nat	Name	SuperLiga	Serbian Cup	Total
1	24	FW	(Serbia)	Nikola Čumić	13	1	14
2	20	MF	(Serbia)	Uroš Nikolić	8	0	8
2	21	MF	(Serbia)	Veljko Simić	7	1	8
3	29	FW	(Serbia)	Filip Malbašić	6	0	6
3	9	FW	(Serbia)	Nemanja Nikolić	4	2	6
4	77	MF	(Senegal)	Yves Baraye	5	0	5
5	10	MF	(Serbia)	Dejan Zukić	3	0	3
5	90	FW	(Serbia)	Jovan Milošević	3	0	3
6	22	MF	(Serbia)	Aleksandar Busnić	2	0	2
6	70	MF	(Serbia)	Uroš Kabić	2	0	2
6	7	MF	(Serbia)	Radomir Milosavljević	2	0	2
6	–	–	–	Own goal	2	0	2
7	6	DF	(Mali)	Mamadou Traoré	1	0	1
7	50	DF	(Serbia)	Milan Lazarević	1	0	1
Totals					59	4	63

Last updated: 28 May 2023

=== Clean sheets ===
Rank	No.	Pos	Nat	Name	SuperLiga	Serbian Cup	Total
1	25	GK	(Montenegro)	Lazar Carević	13	0	13
2	1	GK	(Serbia)	Nikola Simić	0	1	1
Totals					13	1	14

Last updated: 28 May 2023

=== Disciplinary record ===
Number	Nation	Position	Name	Serbian SuperLiga		Serbian Cup		Total	
Number	Nation	Position	Name	Booked	Sent off (straight red)	Booked	Sent off (straight red)	Booked	Sent off (straight red)
2	(Serbia)	DF	Marko Bjeković	3	0	0	0	3	0
4	(Serbia)	DF	Uroš Vitas	4	0	0	1	4	1
6	(Mali)	DF	Mamadou Traoré	4	0	0	0	4	0
7	(Serbia)	MF	Radomir Milosavljević	4	0	1	0	5	0
8	(Serbia)	MF	Mirko Topić	2	0	0	0	2	0
9	(Serbia)	FW	Nemanja Nikolić	4	0	0	0	4	0
10	(Serbia)	MF	Dejan Zukić	5	0	0	0	5	0
11	(Serbia)	DF	Stefan Đorđević	3	0	0	0	3	0
14	(Serbia)	MF	Vladimir Miletić	0	1	0	0	0	1
15	(Serbia)	DF	Igor Jeličić	5	1	1	0	6	1
18	(Serbia)	DF	Filip Antonijević	1	0	1	0	2	0
20	(Serbia)	MF	Uroš Nikolić	1	1	0	0	1	1
21	(Serbia)	MF	Veljko Simić	2	1	0	0	2	1
22	(Serbia)	MF	Aleksandar Busnić	4	0	0	0	4	0
24	(Serbia)	FW	Nikola Čumić	3	0	0	0	3	0
25	(Montenegro)	GK	Lazar Carević	1	0	0	0	1	0
26	(Serbia)	DF	Nemanja Ljubisavljević	1	0	1	0	2	0
27	(Serbia)	FW	Milan Vidakov	1	0	0	0	1	0
29	(Serbia)	FW	Filip Malbašić	3	0	1	0	4	0
44	(Serbia)	MF	Nebojša Bastajić	2	0	0	0	2	0
50	(Serbia)	DF	Milan Lazarević	2	0	2	0	4	0
77	(Senegal)	MF	Yves Baraye	3	0	0	0	3	0
90	(Serbia)	FW	Jovan Milošević	1	0	1	0	2	0
			TOTALS	58	4	8	1	66	5

Last updated: 28 May 2023

=== Game as captain ===
Rank	No.	Pos	Nat	Name	SuperLiga	Serbian Cup	Total
1	11	DF	(Serbia)	Stefan Đorđević	23	0	23
2	4	DF	(Serbia)	Uroš Vitas	6	1	7
3	10	MF	(Serbia)	Dejan Zukić	4	1	5
4	15	DF	(Serbia)	Igor Jeličić	3	1	4
5	8	MF	(Serbia)	Mirko Topić	1	1	2
Totals					37	4	41

Last updated: 28 May 2023

=== Attendances ===
	Matches	Attendances	Average	High	Low
SuperLiga	18	69,364	3,853	9,300	1,000
Serbian Cup	2	2,800	1,400	1,600	1,200
Total	20	72,164	3,608	9,300	1,000

Last updated: 28 May 2023
