= Mamadou Traoré (footballer, born 1994) =

Malian footballer

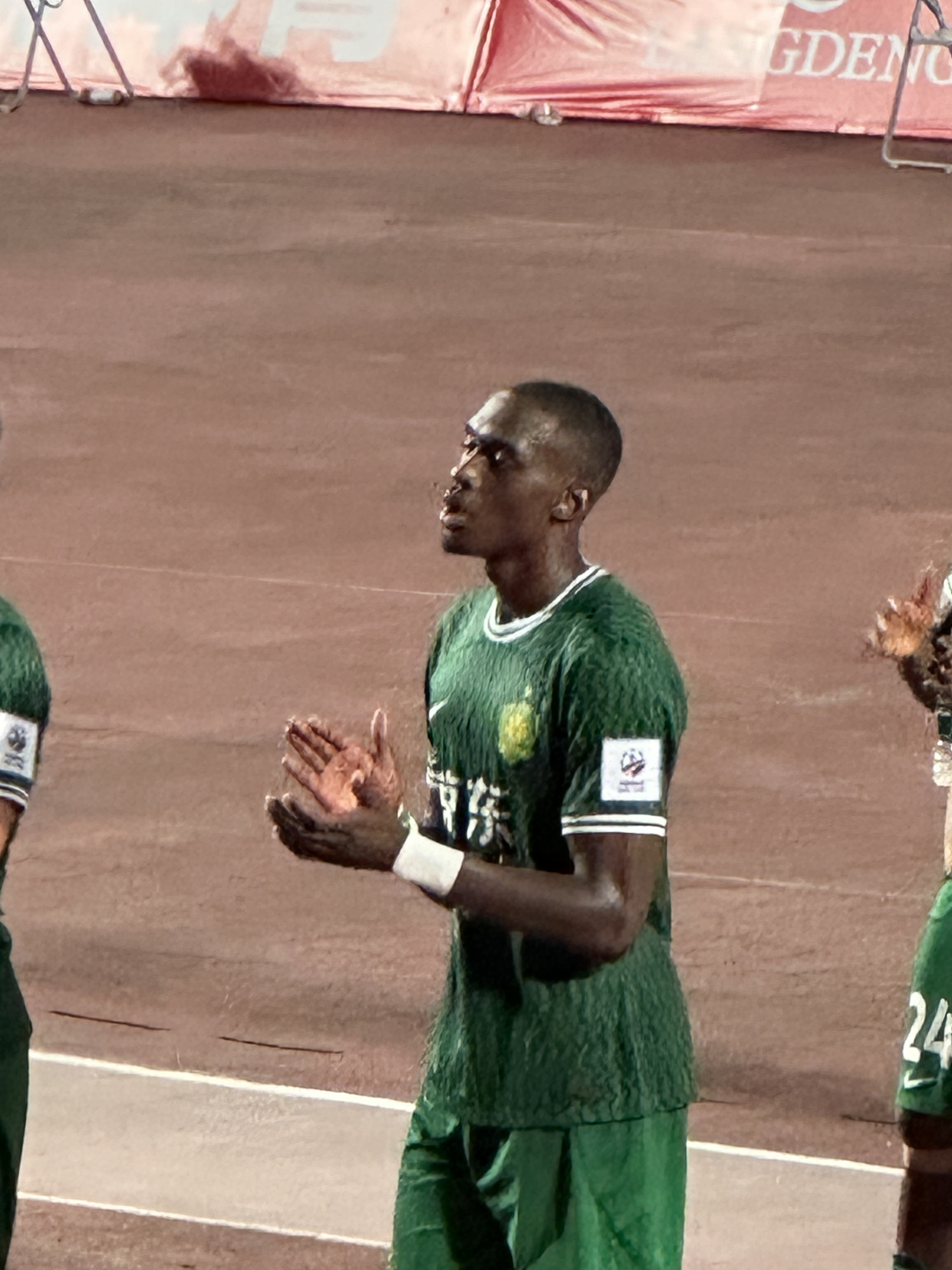
- Traoré with Beijing Guoan in July 2024

Personal information
- Full name: Mamadou Sekou Traoré
- Date of birth: 3 October 1994 (age 32)
- Place of birth: Bamako, Mali
- Height: 1.90 m (6 ft 3 in)
- Position: Centre-back

Team information
- Current team: Dalian Yingbo
- Number: 2

Senior career*
Years	Team	Apps	(Gls)
2012–2014	Elche Ilicitano		
2013	→ Alicante (loan)		
2014	→ Stade Malien (loan)		
2015	SW Florida Adrenaline		
2015–2016	Platense	19	(4)
2016–2017	Alta de Lisboa		
2017–2020	Marítimo B	38	(1)
2020–2021	Torreense	24	(0)
2021–2022	Estrela da Amadora	30	(0)
2022–2023	Vojvodina	32	(1)
2023	Muaither	8	(0)
2024	Beijing Guoan	25	(0)
2025–	Dalian Yingbo	47	(3)

International career^{‡}
2021–	Mali	4	(0)
- * Club domestic league appearances and goals as of 19 November 2026 ‡ National team caps and goals as of 17 October 2023

Mamadou Sekou Traoré (born 3 October 1994) is a Malian professional footballer who plays at centre-back for Chinese Super League club Dalian Yingbo and the Mali national team.

== Club career ==
Traoré started his senior career with Elche Ilicitano. After that, he played for Florida Adrenaline and Platense. In 2017, he signed for Marítimo in the Portuguese Primeira Liga. He played for the B squad and the Under-23 team with that club, making one appearance for the first team in Taça da Liga.

On 2 July 2021, he signed a two-year contract with Estrela da Amadora.

On 14 February 2024, Traoré signed with Chinese Super League club Beijing Guoan. On 2 March 2024, Traoré made his debut for Guoan in a 2–0 away win against Cangzhou Mighty Lions.

On 15 January 2025, Traoré signed with Chinese Super League club Dalian Yingbo as free agent.

== International career ==
He made his debut for Mali national football team on 24 March 2021 in an Africa Cup of Nations qualifier against Guinea.

== Career statistics ==
=== Club ===
As of match played 31 May 2026

Appearances and goals by club, season and competition
Club	Season	League			Cup		League Cup		Other		Total	
Club	Season	Division	Apps	Goals	Apps	Goals	Apps	Goals	Apps	Goals	Apps	Goals
Platense	2015–16	Honduran Liga Nacional	19	4	—		—		—		19	4
Marítimo B	2016–17	Campeonato de Portugal	3	0	—		—		—		3	0
Marítimo B	2017–18	Campeonato de Portugal	23	0	—		—		—		23	0
Marítimo B	2018–19	Campeonato de Portugal	9	0	—		—		—		9	0
Marítimo B	2019–20	Campeonato de Portugal	3	0	—		—		—		3	0
Marítimo B	Total		38	0	—		—		—		38	0
Marítimo	2018–19	Primeira Liga	—		—		1	0	—		1	0
Torreense	2020–21	Campeonato de Portugal	24	0	3	0	—		—		27	0
Estrela	2021–22	Liga Portugal 2	30	0	3	0	2	0	—		35	0
Vojvodina	2022–23	Serbian SuperLiga	31	1	4	0	—		2 (Note: Appearances in UEFA Europa Conference League)	0	37	1
Vojvodina	2023–24	Serbian SuperLiga	1	0	0	0	—		—		1	0
Vojvodina	Total		32	1	4	0	—		2	0	38	1
Muaither	2023–24	Qatar Stars League	8	0	0	0	—		—		8	0
Beijing Guoan	2024	Chinese Super League	25	0	2	0	—		—		27	0
Dalian Yingbo	2025	Chinese Super League	21	1	1	0	—		—		22	1
Dalian Yingbo	2026	Chinese Super League	13	1	0	0	—		—		13	1
Dalian Yingbo	Total		34	2	1	0	—		—		35	2
Career total			207	7	14	0	3	0	2	0	226	7

=== International ===
As of 17 October 2023

Mali
Year	Apps	Goals
2021	1	0
2022	3	0
Total	4	0

== Honours ==
Dalian Yingbo

- Chinese Super League: 2026
