= Mihailo Ivanović (footballer) =

Serbian footballer

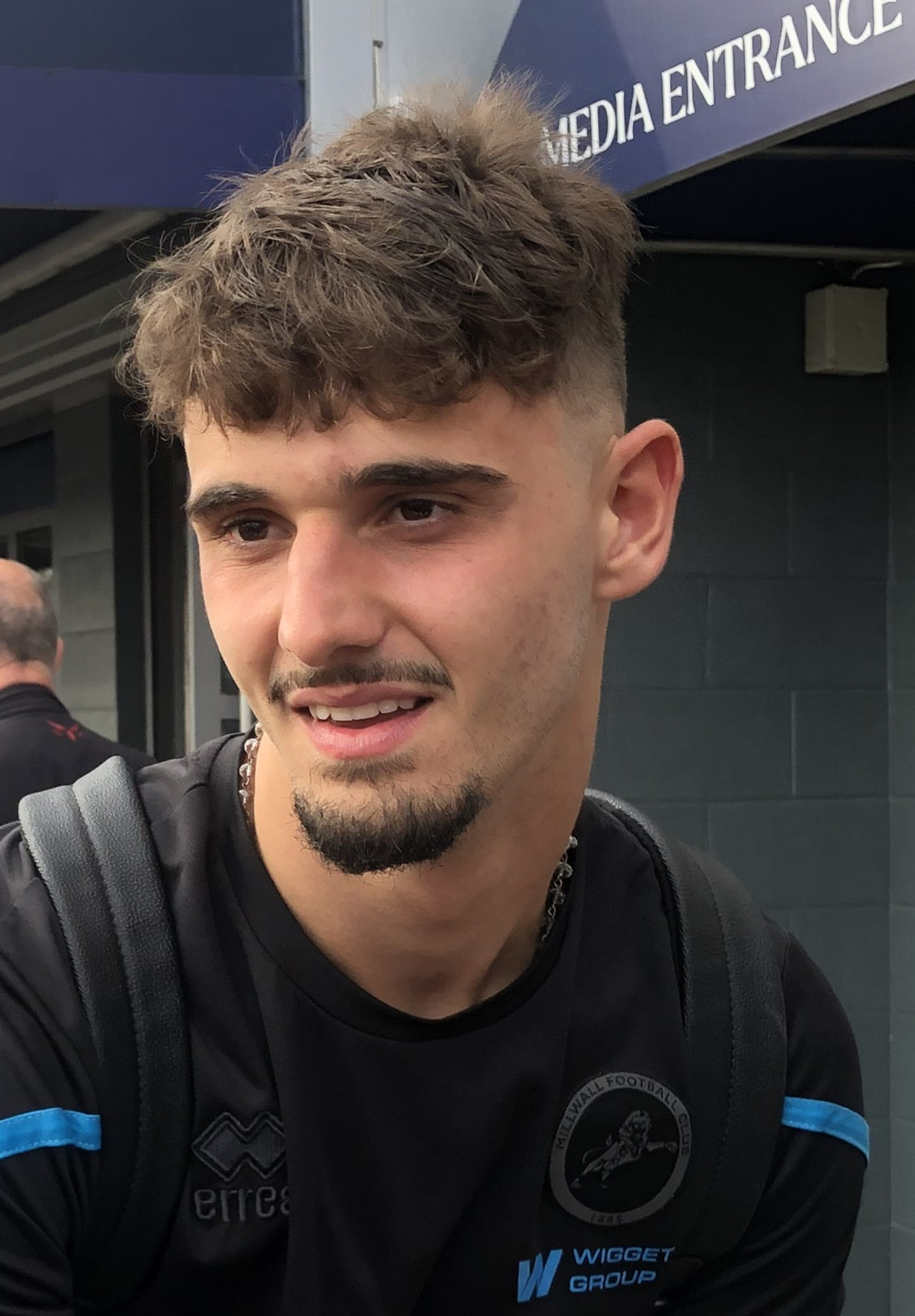
- Mihailo Ivanović in 2025.

Personal information
- Full name: Mihailo Ivanović
- Date of birth: 29 November 2004 (age 21)
- Place of birth: Novi Sad, Serbia and Montenegro
- Height: 1.89 m (6 ft 2 in)
- Position: Centre-forward

Team information
- Current team: Millwall
- Number: 9

Youth career
- 2008–2017: Krila Krajine
- 2017–2022: Vojvodina
- 2022–2023: → Sampdoria (loan)

Senior career*
Years	Team	Apps	(Gls)
2022–2024	Vojvodina	38	(10)
2022–2023	→ Sampdoria (loan)	1	(0)
2024–	Millwall	81	(21)

International career^{‡}
2020	Serbia U17	2	(0)
2021	Serbia U18	2	(1)
2025–	Serbia U21	4	(1)
2024–	Serbia	3	(0)
- * Club domestic league appearances and goals as of 11:18, 9 May 2026 (UTC) ‡ National team caps and goals as of 6:44, 1 February 2026 (UTC)

Mihailo Ivanović (Serbian Cyrillic: Михаило Ивановић; born 29 November 2004) is a Serbian professional footballer who plays as a centre-forward for EFL Championship club Millwall and the Serbia national team.

== Club career ==
=== Vojvodina ===
At the end of March 2021, Ivanović signed his first professional contract with Vojvodina. On 22 May 2022, Ivanović made his first-team debut, replacing Veljko Simić in the 90th minute in a 0–2 away win against TSC Bačka Topola.

On 8 August 2022, Ivanović joined Serie A club Sampdoria on a season-long loan with the option to buy. After Sampdoria failed to activate the option to buy Ivanović, he returned from loan and signed a new three-year contract with the club. On 18 April 2024, Ivanović signed an extension to the existing contract, keeping him at Vojvodina until June 2027.

=== Millwall ===
On 30 August 2024, Ivanović signed a long-term contract with EFL Championship club Millwall for a reported fee of £2.8 million. Following a strong first season for the club, he was named Young Player of the Year at the club's end of season awards, also winning the Goal of the Season award. His impressive form to finish the season also saw him named EFL Young Player of the Month for April 2025 after a run of five goals in six matches.

== International career ==
Ivanović was called up to the Serbia U-17 team in 2020 for its friendly matches. He was member of a national U18 team.

Ivanović received his first call-up to the Serbian senior squad for the Nations League matches against Spain and Denmark in September 2024. On 18 November, he debuted in a Nations League match against the latter at the Dubočica Stadium, replacing Andrija Živković in the 82nd minute of a goalless draw.

== Career statistics ==
As of 11 May 2026

Appearances and goals by club, season and competition
Club	Season	League			National cup (Note: Includes Serbian Cup, FA Cup)		League cup (Note: Includes EFL Cup)		Continental		Other		Total	
Club	Season	Division	Apps	Goals	Apps	Goals	Apps	Goals	Apps	Goals	Apps	Goals	Apps	Goals
Vojvodina	2021–22	Serbian SuperLiga	1	0	0	0	—		0	0	—		1	0
Vojvodina	2022–23	Serbian SuperLiga	0	0	0	0	—		—		—		0	0
Vojvodina	2023–24	Serbian SuperLiga	32	9	5	0	—		1 (Note: Appearance(s) in UEFA Europa Conference League)	0	—		38	9
Vojvodina	2024–25	Serbian SuperLiga	5	1	0	0	—		4 (Note: Appearance(s) in UEFA Europa League)	0	—		9	1
Vojvodina	Total		38	10	5	0	0	0	5	0	0	0	48	10
Sampdoria (loan)	2022–23	Serie A	1	0	0	0	—		—		—		1	0
Millwall	2024–25	EFL Championship	37	12	3	1	0	0	—		—		40	13
Millwall	2025–26	EFL Championship	44	9	0	0	1	0	—		2 (Note: Appearances in EFL Championship play-offs)	0	47	9
Millwall	Total		81	21	3	1	1	0	—		2	0	87	22
Career total			120	31	8	1	1	0	5	0	2	0	136	32

=== International ===
As of match played 18 November 2024

Appearances and goals by national team and year
National team	Year	Apps	Goals
Serbia	2024	1	0
Total		1	0

== Honours ==
Individual

- Millwall Young Player of the Year: 2024–25
- EFL Young Player of the Month: April 2025
- Serbian SuperLiga Player of the Week: 2023–24 (Round 10), (Round 27)
