= Lazar Rosić =

Serbian footballer (born 1993)

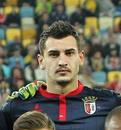
- Rosić with Braga in 2016

Personal information
- Date of birth: 29 June 1993 (age 33)
- Place of birth: Kragujevac, FR Yugoslavia
- Height: 1.90 m (6 ft 3 in)
- Position: Centre-back

Team information
- Current team: AVS
- Number: 3

Youth career
- Šumadija 1903

Senior career*
Years	Team	Apps	(Gls)
2011–2015	Radnički Kragujevac	53	(3)
2015	Radnički Niš	3	(1)
2015–2016	Vojvodina	25	(3)
2016–2019	Braga	32	(2)
2019	→ Nacional (loan)	14	(0)
2019–2022	Moreirense	79	(2)
2022–2023	Khor Fakkan	26	(0)
2023–2024	Vojvodina	15	(0)
2024–2025	Changchun Yatai	45	(2)
2026	AEL	7	(0)
2026–	AVS	5	(0)

International career
2015	Serbia U23	1	(0)
- * Club domestic league appearances and goals as of 13 September 2026

Lazar Rosić (Serbian Cyrillic: Лазар Росић, pronounced [lâzaːr rǒːsitɕ]; born 29 June 1993) is a Serbian professional footballer who plays as a centre-back for Liga Portugal 2 club AVS.

He spent several years in Portugal, where he made over 100 Primeira Liga appearances for Braga, Nacional and Moreirense.

== Career ==
Born in Kragujevac, Rosić played for hometown club Radnički Kragujevac, Radnički Niš and Vojvodina in the Serbian SuperLiga. In June 2016, he moved to Braga of the Portuguese Primeira Liga for a fee of €750,000, on a five-year contract.

Rosić made his Braga debut in the league opener on 14 August 2016, in a 1–0 win at rivals Vitória de Guimarães; he lined up with several other Serbs and Montenegrins. On 19 September, he scored his first goal, at the end of a 3–1 loss at reigning champions Benfica. He was sent off on 5 May 2017, in the 24th minute of a 2–1 defeat at Moreirense.

In December 2018, unused for the season Rosić was loaned to fellow league team Nacional, effective from New Year's Day. On his debut on 7 January, he was hospitalised following a challenge by Porto's Lucas França, but returned for the next game against Belenenses. In a season that ended with relegation, he was sent off on 6 April 2019 in a goalless home draw with Aves.

On 28 June 2019, Rosić signed a three-year deal for Moreirense, with Braga retaining half of his economic rights.

After a spell at Khor Fakkan, on 2 August 2023 Rosić returned to Vojvodina, signing a two-year deal.

On 7 February 2024, Rosić joined Chinese Super League club Changchun Yatai.

== Career statistics ==
As of match played 14 June 2026

Appearances and goals by club, season and competition
Club	Season	League			Cup		League Cup		Continental		Other		Total	
Club	Season	Division	Apps	Goals	Apps	Goals	Apps	Goals	Apps	Goals	Apps	Goals	Apps	Goals
Radnički Kragujevac	2011–12	Serbian SuperLiga	6	1	0	0	—		—		—		6	1
Radnički Kragujevac	2012–13	Serbian SuperLiga	6	0	0	0	—		—		—		6	0
Radnički Kragujevac	2013–14	Serbian SuperLiga	22	1	2	0	—		—		—		24	1
Radnički Kragujevac	2014–15	Serbian SuperLiga	19	1	2	0	—		—		—		21	1
Radnički Kragujevac	Total		53	3	4	0	—		—		—		57	3
Radnički Niš	2015–16	Serbian SuperLiga	3	1	—		—		—		—		3	1
Vojvodina	2015–16	Serbian SuperLiga	25	3	3	0	—		—		—		28	3
Braga	2016–17	Primeira Liga	23	2	2	0	2	0	6	0	0	0	33	2
Braga	2017–18	Primeira Liga	9	0	0	0	2	0	4	0	—		15	0
Braga	Total		32	2	2	0	4	0	10	0	0	0	48	2
Nacional (loan)	2018–19	Primeira Liga	14	0	—		—		—		—		14	0
Moreirense	2019–20	Primeira Liga	18	2	0	0	0	0	—		—		18	2
Moreirense	2020–21	Primeira Liga	33	0	3	1	—		—		—		36	1
Moreirense	2021–22	Primeira Liga	28	0	3	0	1	0	—		1	0	33	0
Moreirense	Total		79	2	6	1	1	0	—		1	0	87	3
Khor Fakkan	2022–23	UAE Pro League	26	0	1	0	2	0	—		—		29	0
Vojvodina	2023–24	Serbian SuperLiga	15	0	2	0	—		—		—		17	0
Changchun Yatai	2024	Chinese Super League	20	1	1	0	—		—		—		21	1
Changchun Yatai	2025	Chinese Super League	25	1	1	0	—		—		—		26	1
Changchun Yatai	Total		45	2	2	0	—		—		—		47	2
AEL	2025–26 Super League Greece	7	0	0	0	—		—		—		7	0	
Career total			299	13	20	1	7	0	10	0	1	0	337	14
