= Matheus Índio (footballer, born 1999) =

Brazilian footballer

Personal information
- Full name: Matheus Salgueiro Pains
- Date of birth: 27 August 1999 (age 27)
- Place of birth: Rio de Janeiro, Brazil
- Height: 1.82 m (6 ft 0 in)
- Position: Defensive midfielder

Team information
- Current team: JEF United Chiba
- Number: 25

Senior career*
Years	Team	Apps	(Gls)
2018–2020	São Caetano	12	(0)
2020–2022	Trofense	53	(1)
2022–2024	Vitória Guimarães	8	(0)
2022–2023	→ Vitória Guimarães B	4	(0)
2023–2024	→ Vojvodina (loan)	23	(2)
2024–2025	Qingdao West Coast	39	(7)
2026	Atlético Goianiense	12	(0)
2026–	JEF United Chiba	1	(0)
- * Club domestic league appearances and goals as of 12 August 2026

Matheus Salgueiro Pains (born 27 August 1999), commonly known as Matheus Índio, is a Brazilian footballer who plays as a defensive midfielder for Japanese club JEF United Chiba.

== Career statistics ==
As of match played 22 November 2025

Appearances and goals by club, season and competition
Club	Season	League			State League		Cup		League Cup		Continental		Other		Total	
Club	Season	Division	Apps	Goals	Apps	Goals	Apps	Goals	Apps	Goals	Apps	Goals	Apps	Goals	Apps	Goals
São Caetano	2018	Paulista	—		—		12	0	—		—		—		12	0
São Caetano	2019	Série D	2	0	0	0	6	0	—		—		—		8	0
São Caetano	2020	Paulista A2	—		10	0	—		—		—		—		10	0
São Caetano	Total		2	0	10	0	18	0	—		—		—		30	0
Trofense	2020–21	Campeonato de Portugal	23	1	—		1	0	—		—		—		24	1
Trofense	2021–22	Liga Portugal 2	30	0	—		1	0	1	0	—		—		32	0
Trofense	Total		53	1	—		2	0	1	0	—		—		56	1
Vitória Guimarães	2022–23	Primeira Liga	8	0	—		1	0	2	0	1	0	—		12	0
Vitória Guimarães	2023–24	Primeira Liga	0	0	—		0	0	0	0	0	0	—		0	0
Vitória Guimarães	Total		8	0	—		1	0	2	0	1	0	—		12	0
Vitória Guimarães B	2022–23	Campeonato de Portugal	4	0	—		—		—		—		—		4	0
Vojvodina (loan)	2023–24	Serbian SuperLiga	23	2	—		2	0	—		—		—		25	2
Qingdao West Coast	2024	Chinese Super League	13	2	—		1	0	—		—		—		14	2
Qingdao West Coast	2025	Chinese Super League	26	5	—		1	0	—		—		—		27	5
Qingdao West Coast	Total		39	7	—		2	0	—		—		—		41	7
Career total			129	10	10	0	25	0	3	0	1	0	—		168	10
