= Claudiu Negoescu =

Romanian footballer

Personal information
- Full name: George Claudiu Negoescu
- Date of birth: 23 April 2003 (age 23)
- Place of birth: Bucharest, Romania
- Height: 1.76 m (5 ft 9 in)
- Position: Midfielder

Youth career
- 2013–2019: FCSB
- 2019–2020: SPAL
- 2020–2021: UTA Arad

Senior career*
Years	Team	Apps	(Gls)
2021–2024	UTA Arad	8	(0)
2021–2022	→ Metaloglobus București (loan)	9	(1)
2023–2024	→ Chindia Târgoviște (loan)	1	(0)

International career
2018–2019	Romania U16	3	(0)
2019	Romania U17	3	(1)
2021	Romania U18	2	(0)
2021	Romania U19	8	(1)
- * Club domestic league appearances and goals as of 15 February 2024

Claudiu George Negoescu (born 23 April 2003) is a Romanian professional footballer who plays as a midfielder.
