= Stefan Vukić =

Serbian footballer

Personal information
- Date of birth: 29 June 1995 (age 31)
- Place of birth: Krušce, Serbia, FR Yugoslavia
- Height: 1.89 m (6 ft 2 in)
- Position: Striker

Team information
- Current team: Anorthosis
- Number: 9

Youth career
- 2012–2014: Radnički Niš

Senior career*
Years	Team	Apps	(Gls)
2014–2015	Radnički Niš	0	(0)
2014	→ Sinđelić Niš (loan)	12	(0)
2015	→ Car Konstantin (loan)	10	(3)
2016	OFK Odžaci	14	(3)
2016–2017	Dunav Prahovo	40	(14)
2018	Budućnost Popovac	15	(4)
2018	Srbobran	17	(7)
2019	Bratstvo Prigrevica	12	(3)
2019	Budućnost Dobanovci	19	(2)
2020–2021	Zlatibor Čajetina	37	(12)
2021–2023	TSC	57	(14)
2023–2024	Vojvodina	11	(0)
2024	→ Radnički Niš (loan)	18	(6)
2024	Chongqing Tonglianglong	10	(2)
2025	Sokol Saratov	10	(1)
2025–	Anorthosis	26	(3)
- * Club domestic league appearances and goals as of 14 June 2026

Stefan Vukić (Serbian Cyrillic: Стефан Вукић; born 29 June 1995) is a Serbian professional footballer who plays as a striker for Anorthosis Famagusta.

== Professional career ==
=== Early career ===
A member of Radnički Niš youth academy until 2014. After two loans at Sinđelić Niš and Car Konstantin, FK Radnički Niš decided to sale him to OFK Odžaci and many struggling years come for him in lower divisions of Serbia.

=== Zlatibor Čajetina ===
On January 14, 2020, with his market value at 150 thousand euros and a good performance at Budućnost Dobanovci with 3 goals in 19 appearances Zlatibor Čajetina decided to take his signature for two years. After six months in Serbian First League his club won the title and the promotion to the first division of Serbia scoring three goals in seven matches. In the season 2020–21 Serbian SuperLiga his 9 goals in 30 appearances weren't enough for his club to stay in the division but his performance distract big clubs of Serbia and other Countries.

=== Vojvodina ===
On 30 June 2023, Vukić signed a two-year deal with Vojvodina.

==== Loan to Radnički Niš ====
In January 2024, Vukić was loaned to Radnički Niš, until the end of the season.

=== Chongqing Tonglianglong ===
On 15 July 2024, Vukić signed for Chinese club Chongqing Tonglianglong.

== Career statistics ==
As of match played 18 May 2025

Appearances and goals by club, season and competition
Club	Season	League			Cup		Continental		Other		Total	
Club	Season	Division	Apps	Goals	Apps	Goals	Apps	Goals	Apps	Goals	Apps	Goals
Budućnost Dobanovci	2019–20	Serbian First League	19	2	1	0	—		—		20	2
Zlatibor Čajetina	2019–20	Serbian First League	7	3	—		—		—		32	13
Zlatibor Čajetina	2020–21	Serbian SuperLiga	30	9	0	0	—		—		34	10
Zlatibor Čajetina	Total		37	12	0	0	—		—		63	17
TSC	2021–22	Serbian SuperLiga	30	11	2	2	—		—		32	13
TSC	2022–23	Serbian SuperLiga	27	3	4	1	—		—		31	4
TSC	Total		57	14	6	3	—		—		63	17
Vojvodina	2023–24	Serbian SuperLiga	11	0	1	1	2	0	—		14	1
Radnički Niš (loan)	2023–24	Serbian SuperLiga	18	6	—		—		—		18	6
Chongqing Tonglianglong	2024	China League One	10	2	—		—		—		10	2
Sokol Saratov	2024–25	Russian First League	10	1	—		—		—		10	1
Career total			162	37	8	4	2	0	0	0	172	41

== Honours ==
Zlatibor Čajetina

- Serbian First League: 2019–20

Individual

- Serbian SuperLiga Player of the Week: 2021–22 (Round 28)
