= Uroš Kabić =

Serbian footballer (born 2004)

Personal information
- Full name: Uroš Kabić
- Date of birth: 1 January 2004 (age 22)
- Place of birth: Novi Sad, Serbia and Montenegro
- Height: 1.83 m (6 ft 0 in)
- Position: Winger

Team information
- Current team: Dunajská Streda
- Number: 7

Youth career
- Škola fudbala Bistrica 05
- 2014–2022: Vojvodina

Senior career*
Years	Team	Apps	(Gls)
2020–2023	Vojvodina	44	(2)
2023–2025	Red Star Belgrade	3	(0)
2024	→ Torino (loan)	0	(0)
2024–2025	→ Čukarički (loan)	17	(1)
2025	→ OFK Beograd (loan)	7	(0)
2025–2026	OFK Beograd	26	(2)
2026–	Dunajská Streda	4	(1)

International career^{‡}
2019	Serbia U15	4	(0)
2019	Serbia U16	2	(0)
2020–2021	Serbia U17	2	(1)
2021–2022	Serbia U18	2	(1)
2021–2023	Serbia U19	12	(4)
2023–	Serbia U21	5	(0)
- * Club domestic league appearances and goals as of 21 September 2026 ‡ National team caps and goals as of 25 March 2025

Uroš Kabić (Serbian Cyrillic: Урош Кабић; born 1 January 2004) is a Serbian professional footballer who plays as a winger for Slovak club Dunajská Streda .

== Club career ==
=== Vojvodina ===
Kabić trained at the Bistrica 05 football school, while he became a member of the Vojvodina youth teams at the age of 10. In February 2019, he signed his first contract with the club. He made his first appearance for the senior team in the 13th round of the 2020–21 Serbian SuperLiga season, against Bačka from Bačka Palanka. The Head coach Nenad Lalatović on that match puted Kabić in the game from the bench in the 71st minute instead of Aranđel Stojković, with the score 3:1, and with that Kabić made his professional football debut on 30 October 2020. After that, he continued to play for the youth team. A few days after his debut, he extended his contract with the club. At the end of the first half of the season, Kabić was one of the reserve players on the bench for Vojvodina in the last three matches in the Serbian SuperLiga, against Mačva Šabac from Šabac, Spartak Subotica from Subotica and city rivals Proleter Novi Sad. Along with several teammates from the youth team, Kabić appeared at the first gathering of the first team in 2021. In the second half of the season, he also sat on the bench for several matches, and entered the game in the matches against Novi Pazar and Rad in early April. In the first preparatory match during the summer of 2021, Kabić was the scorer of the only goal in a minimal victory over Śląsk Wrocław from Wrocław. He scored his first goal in the second leg of the second round of the 2021–22 UEFA Europa Conference League qualifiers, against Lithuanian club Panevėžys. Kabić also scored the only goal in a 6–1 defeat to LASK from Linz, which saw Vojvodina eliminated from the competition after the third round of the qualifiers.

=== Red Star Belgrade ===
On 23 July 2023, Kabić signed a four-year contract with Red Star Belgrade.

=== Torino ===
On 1 February 2024, Kabić moved to Torino in Italian Serie A on loan with an option to buy.

== International career ==
Kabić was called in Serbia U16 national team squad during the 2019, and played two friendly games against Slovakia U16. After that, he was member of a national U17 team, and debut against Bulgaria U17.

== Career statistics ==
As of 30 June 2023

Club	Season	League			Cup		Continental		Total	
Club	Season	Division	Apps	Goals	Apps	Goals	Apps	Goals	Apps	Goals
Vojvodina	2020–21	Serbian SuperLiga	6	0	0	0	—		6	0
Vojvodina	2021–22	Serbian SuperLiga	19	0	3	0	4 (Note: Appearances in UEFA Europa Conference League Qualifying rounds)	2	26	2
Vojvodina	2022–23	Serbian SuperLiga	19	2	2	0	—		21	2
Vojvodina	Total		44	2	5	0	4	2	53	4
Career total			44	2	5	0	4	2	53	4
