= Matvey Martinkevich =

Russian footballer

Personal information
- Full name: Matvey Janovich Martinkevich
- Date of birth: 2 November 2002 (age 24)
- Place of birth: Moscow, Russia
- Height: 1.95 m (6 ft 5 in)
- Position: Centre-forward

Team information
- Current team: Dynamo Kirov
- Number: 6

Youth career
- 2006–2007: FK Kuntsevo
- 2007–2013: CSKA Moscow
- 2014–2016: Škola fudbala Junior
- 2016–2018: ČSK Čelarevo
- 2018–2021: Vojvodina

Senior career*
| Years | Team | Apps | (Gls) |
| 2021–2023 | Vojvodina | 1 | (0) |
| 2021–2022 | → Kabel (loan) | 30 | (2) |
| 2022–2023 | → Loznica (loan) | 24 | (4) |
| 2023–2024 | Radnik Surdulica | 8 | (0) |
| 2024–2025 | Radnički Zrenjanin | | |
| 2025– | Dynamo Kirov | 48 | (10) |
- * Club domestic league appearances and goals as of 15 November 2026

Matvey Janovich Martinkevich (Russian: Матвей Янович Мартинкевич; Serbian Cyrillic: Матвеј Јанович Мартинкевич; born 2 November 2002), is a Russian and Serbian professional footballer who plays as a centre-forward for Dynamo Kirov.
