= Filip Antonijević =

Serbian footballer

Personal information
- Full name: Filip Antonijević
- Date of birth: 24 July 2000 (age 26)
- Place of birth: Belgrade, FR Yugoslavia
- Height: 1.75 m (5 ft 9 in)
- Position: Left-back

Team information
- Current team: Bor

Youth career
- Partizan

Senior career*
Years	Team	Apps	(Gls)
2018–2019	Teleoptik	30	(2)
2020	Kolubara	5	(1)
2020–2021	Metalac Gornji Milanovac	17	(3)
2021	MTK Budapest	2	(0)
2021–2022	Metalac Gornji Milanovac	35	(3)
2022–2024	Vojvodina	9	(0)
2023–2024	→ Voždovac (loan)	21	(2)
2024	Radnik Bijeljina	4	(0)
2025	Voždovac	11	(1)
2025–2026	FAP	29	(1)
2026–	Bor	9	(0)
- * Club domestic league appearances and goals as of 23 September 2026

Filip Antonijević (Serbian Cyrillic: Филип Антонијевић; born 24 July 2000) is a Serbian footballer who plays as a left-back for Bor.

== Club career ==
=== Early years ===
Antonijević was brought up through the ranks at Partizan.

=== Teleoptik ===
In August 2018, Antonijević moved to Teleoptik on a free transfer. He made his competitive debut for the club on 12 August 2018 in a 1–0 away victory over Novi Pazar. He scored his first competitive goal for Teleoptik about a month later, on 17 September 2018 in a 1–1 away draw with Metalac Gornji Milanovac. His goal, scored in the 88th minute, leveled the scores at one.
