= Aleksandar Busnić =

Serbian footballer

Personal information
- Date of birth: 4 December 1997 (age 28)
- Place of birth: Belgrade, FR Yugoslavia
- Height: 1.92 m (6 ft 4 in)
- Position: Defensive midfielder

Team information
- Current team: Garudayaksa
- Number: 22

Youth career
- Rad

Senior career*
Years	Team	Apps	(Gls)
2015–2021	Rad	75	(2)
2016–2017	→ Žarkovo (loan)	35	(3)
2017–2018	→ Bežanija (loan)	22	(4)
2021–2024	Vojvodina	53	(2)
2023–2024	→ Vizela (loan)	19	(0)
2024–2026	Vizela	74	(4)
2026–	Garudayaksa	1	(0)

International career^{‡}
2021	Serbia	1	(0)
- * Club domestic league appearances and goals as of 19 September 2026 ‡ National team caps and goals as of 4 February 2024

Aleksandar Busnić (Serbian Cyrillic: Александар Буснић; born 4 December 1997) is a Serbian professional footballer who plays as a defensive midfielder for Super League club Garudayaksa.

== International career ==
Busnić made his debut for Serbia in a January 2021 friendly match against the Dominican Republic, coming on as a 84th-minute substitute for Jovan Nišić.
