= Radomir Milosavljević =

Serbian footballer

Personal information
- Date of birth: 28 July 1992 (age 34)
- Place of birth: Ćuprija, FR Yugoslavia
- Height: 1.83 m (6 ft 0 in)
- Position: Attacking midfielder

Team information
- Current team: FK Radnički Niš
- Number: 22

Youth career
- Mladost Lučani

Senior career*
Years	Team	Apps	(Gls)
2009–2017	Mladost Lučani	209	(19)
2017–2018	Lugano	5	(0)
2018–2021	AEL	96	(12)
2022	Mladost Lučani	15	(1)
2022–2024	Vojvodina	48	(6)
2024–2025	Kashima Antlers	10	(0)
2025	→ FK Radnički Niš (loan)	15	(1)
2025–	FK Radnički Niš	30	(4)
- * Club domestic league appearances and goals as of 13 June 2026

Radomir Milosavljević (Serbian Cyrillic: Радомир Милосављевић; born 28 July 1992) is a Serbian professional footballer who plays as a midfielder for Serbian SuperLiga club FK Radnički Niš.

== Club career ==
=== FC Lugano ===
On 12 June 2017, Milosavljević was announced at Lugano on a two year contract, with the option of a further season.

On 17 October 2017, Milosavljević played for Lugano's U21 side, scoring against FC Brunnen in the 13th minute.

=== AEL ===
On 27 December 2017, Milosavljević was announced at AEL. On 1 March 2020, he scored a hattrick against Asteras Tripolis.

Until 2021 Milosavljević played for Greek Super League club AEL, for which he was the team's first captain.

=== Second spell at Mladost Lučani ===
On 11 January 2022, Milosavljević was announced at Mladost Lučani.

=== Vojvodina ===
On 8 June 2022 Milosavljević signed a two-year contract with Vojvodina. On 10 November 2023, Milosavljević signed a two-year extension to his existing contract.

=== Kashima Antlers ===
In March 2024, Milosavljević joined up with manager and fellow countryman Ranko Popović at J1 League club Kashima Antlers. On 22 May 2024, he suffered an injury against Machida Zelvia that would keep him out for 2 months. He made 13 appearances for the club across all competitions, but played less than 200 minutes overall.

=== Loan to FK Radnički Niš ===
In January 2025, Milosavljević moved on loan to Serbian SuperLiga club FK Radnički Niš for the remainder of the Serbian league season.

== Career statistics ==
As of 13 January 2025

Appearances and goals by club, season and competition
Club	Season	League			Cup		Continental		Total	
Club	Season	Division	Apps	Goals	Apps	Goals	Apps	Goals	Apps	Goals
Mladost Lučani	2009–10	Serbian First League	7	0	0	0	—		7	0
Mladost Lučani	2010–11	Serbian First League	23	2	0	0	—		23	2
Mladost Lučani	2011–12	Serbian First League	30	3	0	0	—		30	3
Mladost Lučani	2012–13	Serbian First League	30	2	1	1	—		31	3
Mladost Lučani	2013–14	Serbian First League	28	3	1	0	—		29	3
Mladost Lučani	2014–15	Serbian SuperLiga	28	2	0	0	—		28	2
Mladost Lučani	2015–16	Serbian SuperLiga	30	3	1	0	—		31	3
Mladost Lučani	2016–17	Serbian SuperLiga	33	4	3	3	—		36	7
Mladost Lučani	Total		209	19	6	4	—		215	23
Lugano	2017–18	Swiss Super League	5	0	1	0	4 (Note: Appearances in the Europa League)	0	10	0
AEL	2017–18	Super League Greece	14	1	5	0	—		19	1
AEL	2018–19	Super League Greece	27	2	3	0	—		30	2
AEL	2019–20	Super League Greece	30	9	2	0	—		32	9
AEL	2020–21	Super League Greece	25	0	2	0	—		27	0
AEL	Total		96	12	12	0	—		108	12
Mladost Lučani	2021–22	Serbian SuperLiga	15	1	0	0	—		15	1
Vojvodina	2022–23	Serbian SuperLiga	26	2	3	0	—		29	2
Vojvodina	2023–24	Serbian SuperLiga	22	4	1	0	2	0	25	4
Vojvodina	Total		48	6	4	0	2	0	54	6
Kashima Antlers	2024	J1 League	10	0	3 (Note: Includes Emperor's Cup and J.League Cup)	0	0	0	13	0
Career total			383	38	26	4	6	0	415	42

== Honours ==
Mladost Lučani

- Serbian First League: 2013–14

Individual

- Serbian SuperLiga Player of the Week: 2023–24 (Round 8)
