= Lazar Carević =

Montenegrin footballer (born 1999)

Personal information
- Date of birth: 16 March 1999 (age 27)
- Place of birth: Cetinje, Montenegro, FR Yugoslavia
- Height: 1.95 m (6 ft 5 in)
- Position: Goalkeeper

Team information
- Current team: Famalicão
- Number: 25

Youth career
- Grbalj

Senior career*
Years	Team	Apps	(Gls)
2015–2017	Grbalj	74	(0)
2017–2022	Barcelona B	25	(0)
2022–2024	Vojvodina	74	(0)
2024–	Famalicão	52	(0)

International career^{‡}
2014–2015	Montenegro U17	12	(0)
2016	Montenegro U19	5	(0)
2016–2020	Montenegro U21	10	(0)
2022–	Montenegro	2	(0)
- * Club domestic league appearances and goals as of 25 May 2026 ‡ National team caps and goals as of 13:32, 07 April 2025 (UTC)

Lazar Carević (Cyrillic: Лазар Царевић; born 16 March 1999) is a Montenegrin professional footballer who plays as a goalkeeper for Primeira Liga club Famalicão and the Montenegro national team.

== Club career ==
Carević began his senior career with Grbalj in the Montenegrin First League in 2015. He transferred to Barcelona B on 29 May 2017. He won the 2016–17 UEFA Youth League in his first season with the Barcelona youth academy. On 7 July 2020, he extended his contract with Barcelona B, keeping him at the side until 2023. On 6 November 2021, he appeared on the bench for the senior Barcelona side for the first time, for a La Liga match against Celta Vigo.

On 18 June 2022, Carević signed a three-year deal with Serbian SuperLiga club Vojvodina. In June 2023, the contract was extended for an additional year, keeping Carević at the club until June 2026.

== International career ==
Carević is a youth international for Montenegro, having played for the Montenegro U17s, U19s and U21s. He made his debut with the senior Montenegro national team in a friendly 1–0 loss to Armenia on 24 March 2022, coming on as a half-time sub.

== Personal life ==
Carević's father, Marko Carević, is a Montenegrin politician, businessman, and football executive.

== Career statistics ==
As of 16 May 2026.

Club	Season	League			Cup		Europe		Total	
Club	Season	Division	Apps	Goals	Apps	Goals	Apps	Goals	Apps	Goals
Grbalj	2014–15	Montenegrin First League	6	0	—		—		6	0
Grbalj	2015–16	Montenegrin First League	27	0	3	0	—		30	0
Grbalj	2016–17	Montenegrin First League	31	0	7	0	—		38	0
Grbalj	Total		64	0	10	0	—		74	0
Barcelona B	2018–19	Segunda División B	7	0	—		—		7	0
Barcelona B	2019–20	Segunda División B	5	0	—		—		5	0
Barcelona B	2020–21	Segunda División B	4	0	—		—		4	0
Barcelona B	2021–22	Primera División RFEF	9	0	—		—		9	0
Barcelona B	Total		25	0	—		—		25	0
Vojvodina	2022–23	Serbian SuperLiga	35	0	1	0	—		36	0
Vojvodina	2023–24	Serbian SuperLiga	33	0	3	0	2	0	38	0
Vojvodina	2024–25	Serbian SuperLiga	3	0	—		4	0	7	0
Vojvodina	Total		71	0	4	0	6	0	81	0
Famalicão	2024–25	Primeira Liga	18	0	2	0	—		20	0
Famalicão	2025–26	Primeira Liga	34	0	0	0	—		34	0
Famalicão	Total		52	0	2	0	—		54	0
Career total			212	0	16	0	6	0	234	0

== Honours ==
Individual

- Primeira Liga Goalkeeper of the Month: February 2025, August 2025
