= Vladimir Miletić =

Serbian footballer

Personal information
- Full name: Vladimir Miletić
- Date of birth: 5 March 2003 (age 23)
- Place of birth: Brus, Serbia and Montenegro (now Serbia)
- Height: 1.85 m (6 ft 1 in)
- Position: Defensive midfielder

Team information
- Current team: Slavia Sofia
- Number: 95

Youth career
- –2020: Red Star Belgrade
- 2020: → Grafičar Beograd (loan)
- 2020–2021: Vojvodina

Senior career*
| Years | Team | Apps | (Gls) |
| 2021–2024 | Vojvodina | 27 | (0) |
| 2024 | Voždovac | 13 | (1) |
| 2024–2026 | Napredak Kruševac | 52 | (2) |
| 2026– | Slavia Sofia | 10 | (0) |

International career
| 2018–2019 | Serbia U16 | 6 | (1) |
| 2019–2020 | Serbia U17 | 6 | (0) |
| 2021–2022 | Serbia U19 | 16 | (3) |
| 2022–2023 | Serbia U21 | 4 | (0) |
- * Club domestic league appearances and goals as of 10 November 2026

Vladimir Miletić (Serbian Cyrillic: Владимир Милетић; born 5 March 2003) is a Serbian professional footballer who plays as a defensive midfielder for Bulgarian First League club Slavia Sofia.

== Career statistics ==
=== Club ===
As of 7 June 2026

| Club | Season | League | | | Cup | | Continental | | Total | |
| Club | Season | Division | Apps | Goals | Apps | Goals | Apps | Goals | Apps | Goals |
|---|---|---|---|---|---|---|---|---|---|---|
| Vojvodina | 2020–21 | Serbian SuperLiga | 3 | 0 | 0 | 0 | — | | 3 | 0 |
| Vojvodina | 2021–22 | Serbian SuperLiga | 9 | 0 | 2 | 0 | 0 | 0 | 11 | 0 |
| Vojvodina | 2022–23 | Serbian SuperLiga | 12 | 0 | 0 | 0 | — | | 12 | 0 |
| Vojvodina | 2023–24 | Serbian SuperLiga | 3 | 0 | 2 | 1 | 1 (Note: Appearance in the UEFA Europa Conference League qualifying round) | 0 | 6 | 1 |
| Vojvodina | Total | | 27 | 0 | 4 | 1 | 1 | 0 | 32 | 1 |
| Voždovac | 2023–24 | Serbian SuperLiga | 13 | 1 | 0 | 0 | — | | 13 | 1 |
| Napredak Kruševac | 2024–25 | Serbian SuperLiga | 27 | 2 | 4 | 0 | — | | 31 | 2 |
| Napredak Kruševac | 2025–26 | Serbian SuperLiga | 25 | 0 | 0 | 0 | — | | 25 | 0 |
| Napredak Kruševac | Total | | 52 | 2 | 4 | 0 | 0 | 0 | 56 | 2 |
| Career total | | | 92 | 3 | 8 | 1 | 1 | 0 | 101 | 4 |
