= Nikola Čumić =

Serbian footballer

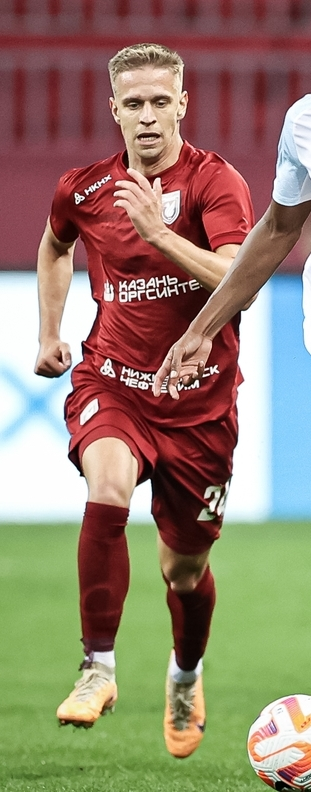
- Čumić in 2023

Personal information
- Date of birth: 20 November 1998 (age 28)
- Place of birth: Užice, FR Yugoslavia
- Height: 1.74 m (5 ft 9 in)
- Position: Winger

Team information
- Current team: Partizan
- Number: 27

Youth career
- 2005–2016: Sloboda Užice

Senior career*
Years	Team	Apps	(Gls)
2015–2016	Sloboda Užice	13	(0)
2016–2018	Metalac Gornji Milanovac	61	(10)
2019–2020	Radnički Niš	31	(13)
2020–2022	Olympiacos	0	(0)
2020–2021	→ Sporting Gijón (loan)	28	(1)
2021–2022	→ Luzern (loan)	24	(4)
2022–2023	Vojvodina	35	(15)
2023–2026	Rubin Kazan	38	(3)
2026	→ Zaragoza (loan)	8	(0)
2026–	Partizan	11	(2)

International career^{‡}
2019–2020	Serbia U21	5	(0)
2024–	Serbia	2	(0)
- * Club domestic league appearances and goals as of 22 November 2026 ‡ National team caps and goals as of 15 October 2024

Nikola Čumić (Serbian Cyrillic: Никола Чумић; born 20 November 1998) is a Serbian professional footballer who plays as a winger for Serbian SuperLiga club Partizan and the Serbia national team.

== Club career ==
=== Sloboda Užice ===
After he passed all youth categories of Sloboda Užice, Čumić joined the first team for the 2014–15 season. He made his senior debut on 13 May 2015, against Mačva Šabac. During the 2015–16 Serbian First League season, Čumić made 12 appearances, and also made one appearance in Serbian Cup, against Loznica.

=== Metalac Gornji Milanovac ===
In summer 2016, Čumić moved to Serbian SuperLiga side Metalac Gornji Milanovac and signed a three-year contract with new club. He made his SuperLiga debut on 29 July 2016, replacing Walberto Caicedo in 71 minute of the match against Red Star Belgrade. Čumić noted his first appearance in starting 11 in a match against Voždovac, played on 14 August 2016.

=== Radnički Niš ===
In winter 2018, Čumić signed with a Radnički Niš.

=== Olympiacos ===
On 19 December 2019, Olympiacos officially announced the signing of Čumić for a transfer fee estimated in the region of €500,000; he would remain in his former club until the end of the 2019–20 season. On 16 September 2020, he joined Sporting de Gijón of the Spanish Segunda División on loan for one year.

On 31 August 2021, he joined Luzern on a season-long loan.

=== Vojvodina ===
On 1 September 2022, Čumić signed a three-year deal with Serbian SuperLiga club Vojvodina, for an undisclosed fee.

=== Rubin Kazan ===
On 14 September 2023, Čumić signed a four-year deal with Russian Premier League club Rubin Kazan, for an undisclosed fee.

On 1 February 2026, Čumić was loaned to Zaragoza in the Spanish Segunda División until the end of the 2025–26 season.

=== Partizan ===
On 18 August 2026, Čumić returned to Serbia and signed a two-season contract with Partizan.

== International career ==
Čumić was called up to the senior Serbia national team for the first time in June 2023 for a friendly against Jordan, but remained on the bench in the game. He made his debut on 12 October 2024 in a UEFA Nations League game against Switzerland. He substituted Veljko Birmančević in the 88th minute, as Serbia won 2–0.

== Career statistics ==
As of match played 22 November 2026

Appearances and goals by club, season and competition
Club	Season	League			Cup		Continental		Total	
Club	Season	Division	Apps	Goals	Apps	Goals	Apps	Goals	Apps	Goals
Sloboda Užice	2014–15	Serbian First League	1	0	0	0	—		1	0
Sloboda Užice	2015–16	Serbian First League	12	0	1	0	—		13	0
Sloboda Užice	Total		13	0	1	0	—		14	0
Metalac Gornji Milanovac	2016–17	Serbian SuperLiga	26	1	1	0	—		27	1
Metalac Gornji Milanovac	2017–18	Serbian First League	21	4	1	0	—		22	4
Metalac Gornji Milanovac	2018–19	Serbian First League	14	5	1	0	—		15	5
Metalac Gornji Milanovac	Total		61	10	3	0	—		64	10
Radnički Niš	2018–19	Serbian SuperLiga	8	1	0	0	—		8	1
Radnički Niš	2019–20	Serbian SuperLiga	23	12	3	3	1	1	27	16
Radnički Niš	Total		31	13	3	3	1	1	35	17
Sporting Gijón (loan)	2020–21	Segunda División	28	1	3	1	—		31	2
Luzern (loan)	2021–22	Swiss Super League	24	4	2	0	—		26	4
Vojvodina	2022–23	Serbian SuperLiga	29	13	4	1	—		33	14
Vojvodina	2023–24	Serbian SuperLiga	6	2	0	0	2	0	8	2
Vojvodina	Total		35	15	4	1	2	0	41	16
Rubin Kazan	2023–24	Russian Premier League	11	1	3	0	—		14	1
Rubin Kazan	2024–25	Russian Premier League	20	2	9	0	—		29	2
Rubin Kazan	2025–26	Russian Premier League	7	0	4	0	—		11	0
Rubin Kazan	Total		38	3	16	0	—		54	3
Partizan	2026–27	Serbian SuperLiga	11	2	1	1	2	0	14	3
Career total			241	48	33	6	5	1	279	55

== Honours ==
Individual

- Serbian SuperLiga Player of the Week: 2023–24 (Round 4)
