= Dušan Stevanović (footballer, born 1996) =

Serbian footballer

Personal information
- Full name: Dušan Stevanović
- Date of birth: 22 June 1996 (age 30)
- Place of birth: Niš, FR Yugoslavia
- Height: 1.86 m (6 ft 1 in)
- Position: Centre-back

Senior career*
Years	Team	Apps	(Gls)
2013–2015	TSV Neumarkt	17	(0)
2015–2016	Ozren Sokobanja	11	(0)
2016	Lovćen	9	(0)
2017–2018	Dinamo Vranje	35	(1)
2018–2021	Radnik Surdulica	82	(0)
2021–2022	Vojvodina	28	(1)
2022–2023	Radnik Surdulica	24	(0)
2023–2024	Persebaya Surabaya	29	(3)
2024–2025	TSC	12	(0)
2025–2026	AEL Limassol	25	(0)
- * Club domestic league appearances and goals as of 27 April 2026

Dušan Stevanović (Serbian Cyrillic: Душан Стевановић; born 22 June 1996) is a Serbian professional footballer who plays as a centre-back.
