= Uroš Nikolić (footballer) =

Serbian footballer

Uros Nikolić Урош Никoлић
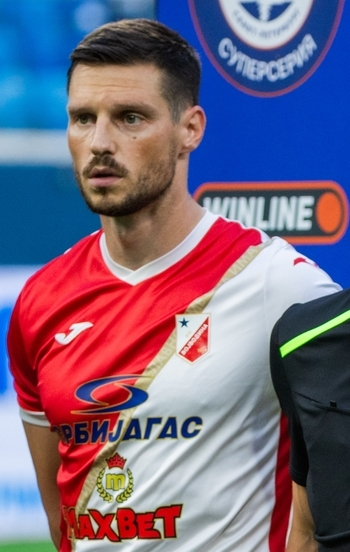

Personal information
- Date of birth: 14 December 1993 (age 32)
- Place of birth: Niš, FR Yugoslavia
- Height: 1.85 m (6 ft 1 in)
- Position: Attacking midfielder

Team information
- Current team: Čukarički

Youth career
- Radnički Niš
- 2007–2012: Partizan

Senior career*
Years	Team	Apps	(Gls)
2012–2014	Videoton	6	(0)
2012	→ Videoton II	11	(1)
2013	→ Puskás Akadémia (loan)	9	(1)
2015–2016	Jagodina	39	(6)
2016–2018	Dinamo Minsk	56	(7)
2019–2021	Maccabi Tel Aviv	2	(0)
2022–2026	Vojvodina	82	(15)
2026–	Čukarički	1	(1)

International career
2011	Serbia U-19	11	(0)
2015	Serbia U-23	1	(0)
- * Club domestic league appearances and goals as of 16 August 2026

Uros Nikolić (Serbian Cyrillic: Урош Никoлић; born 14 December 1993) is a Serbian professional footballer who plays as a midfielder for Čukarički.

== Career ==
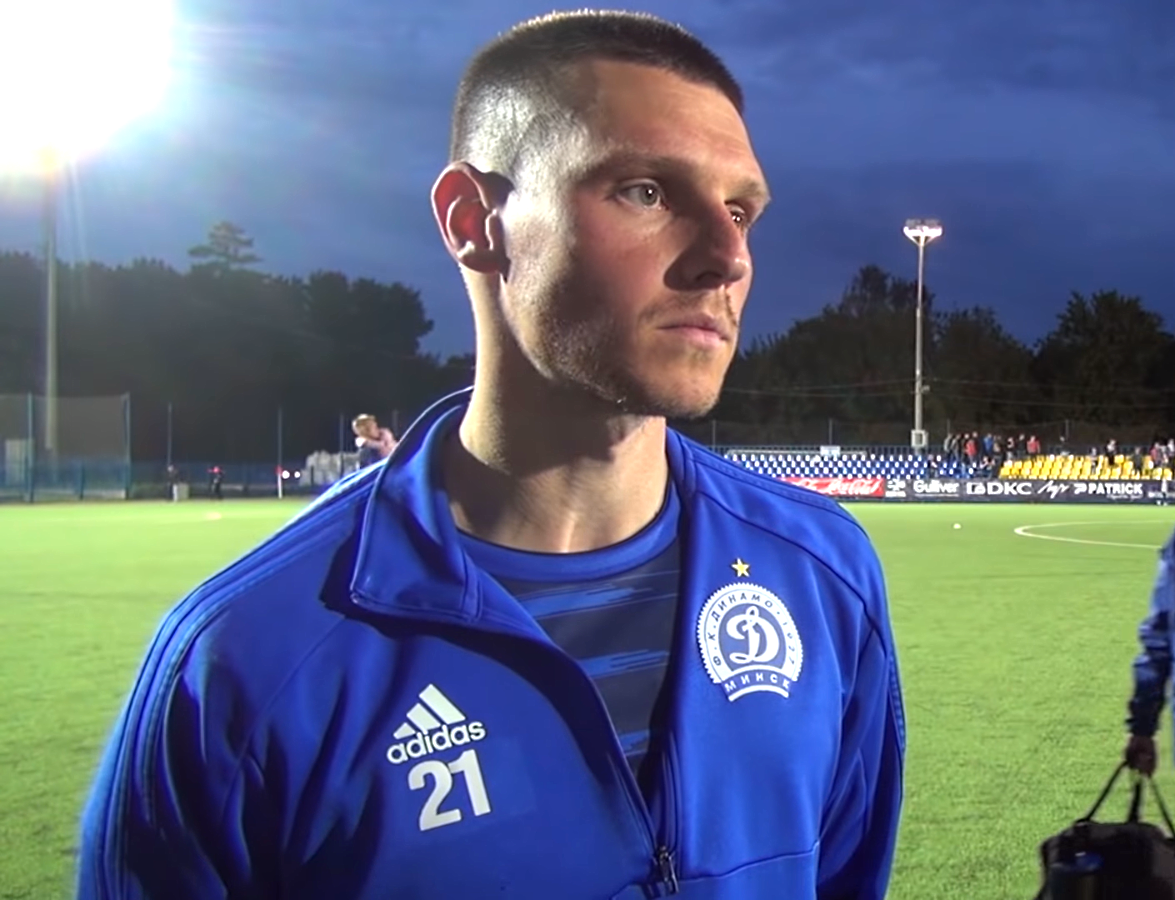
Nikolić with Dinamo Minsk in 2018.

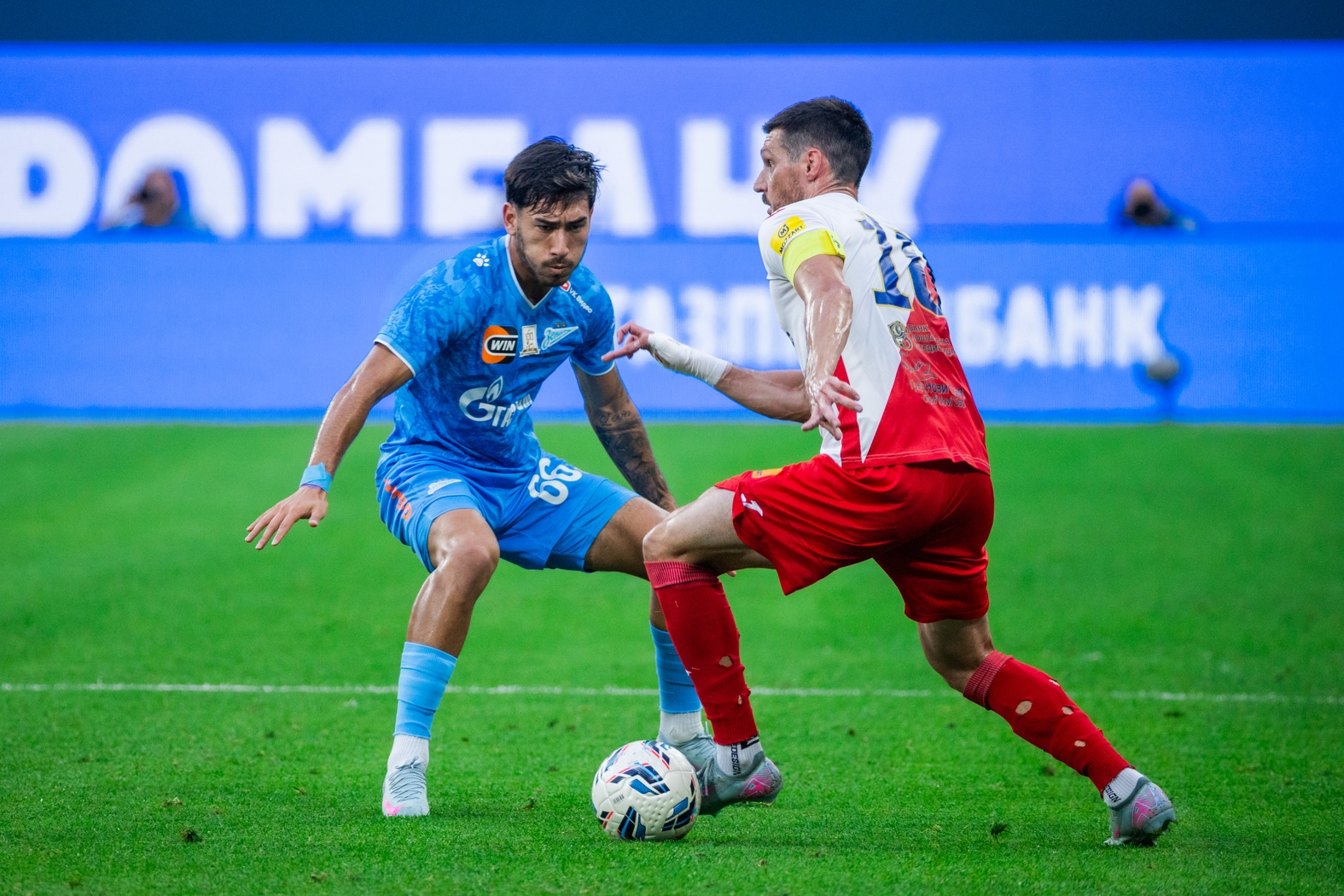
Nikolić in action for Vojvodina in 2025 against Zenit Saint Petersburg

In February 2012, he joined Hungarian club Videoton FC.

In the 2013–14 season he was loaned out to fellow Hungarian first division side Puskás Akadémia.

== Club statistics ==
As of 1 November 2025

Club	Season	League			Cup		League Cup		Europe		Total	
Club	Season	Division	Apps	Goals	Apps	Goals	Apps	Goals	Apps	Goals	Apps	Goals
Videoton	2011–12	Nemzeti Bajnokság I	1	0	0	0	3	0	0	0	4	0
Videoton	2012–13	Nemzeti Bajnokság I	5	0	1	2	5	0	1	0	12	2
Videoton	Total		6	0	1	2	8	0	1	0	16	2
Videoton II (loan)	2011–12	Nemzeti Bajnokság II	11	1	0	0	0	0	0	0	11	1
Puskás Akadémia (loan)	2013–14	Nemzeti Bajnokság I	9	1	3	0	4	0	0	0	16	1
Jagodina	2014–15	Serbian SuperLiga	6	0	1	0	–		–		7	0
Jagodina	2015–16	Serbian SuperLiga	33	6	2	0	–		–		35	6
Jagodina	Total		39	6	3	0	–		–		42	6
Dinamo Minsk	2016	Belarusian Premier League	9	0	0	0	–		–		9	0
Dinamo Minsk	2017	Belarusian Premier League	27	3	3	0	–		6	0	36	3
Dinamo Minsk	2018	Belarusian Premier League	20	4	2	2	–		5	5	27	11
Dinamo Minsk	Total		56	7	5	2	–		11	5	72	14
Maccabi Tel Aviv	2019–20	Israeli Premier League	2	0	0	0	0	0	0	0	2	0
Maccabi Tel Aviv	2020–21	Israeli Premier League	0	0	0	0	0	0	0	0	0	0
Maccabi Tel Aviv	Total		2	0	0	0	0	0	0	0	2	0
Vojvodina	2022–23	Serbian SuperLiga	24	8	4	0	–		–		28	8
Vojvodina	2023–24	Serbian SuperLiga	27	2	3	0	–		2	0	32	2
Vojvodina	2024–25	Serbian SuperLiga	24	4	3	0	–		3	0	30	4
Vojvodina	2025–26	Serbian SuperLiga	7	1	0	0	–		–		7	1
Vojvodina	Total		82	15	10	0	–		5	0	97	15
Career totals			205	30	22	4	12	0	17	5	256	39

== Honours ==
Maccabi Tel Aviv

- Israeli Premier League: 2018–19
- Toto Cup: 2018–19

Individual

- Serbian SuperLiga Player of the Week: 2024–25 (Round 20)
