= Milan Lazarević (footballer) =

Serbian footballer

Personal information
- Date of birth: 10 January 1997 (age 29)
- Place of birth: Milići, Bosnia and Herzegovina
- Height: 1.77 m (5 ft 10 in)
- Position: Full-back

Youth career
- Novi Sad
- Vojvodina

Senior career*
Years	Team	Apps	(Gls)
2016–2020	Vojvodina	29	(0)
2016–2017	→ Proleter Novi Sad (loan)	37	(1)
2020–2021	Rad	42	(2)
2021	Liepāja	5	(0)
2022–2024	Vojvodina	76	(3)
2024-2026	Partizan	5	(0)
- * Club domestic league appearances and goals as of 22 December 2024

Milan Lazarević (Serbian Cyrillic: Милан Лазаревић; born 10 January 1997) is a Serbian footballer who plays as a defender for Partizan.

== Career ==
Coming from Milići where he started playing football, Lazarević played for RFK Novi Sad before he joined Vojvodina youth ranks. At the beginning of 2016, Lazarević moved on loan to Serbian First League club Proleter, making 10 appearances and scoring 1 goal until the end of the 2015–16 season. In summer 2016, he returned to Vojvodina, but also continued training with Proleter. In May 2018, Lazarević signed his first professional contract, a two-year deal with Vojvodina. On 26 January 2020 he signed a two-year deal with Rad. On 22 July 2021 Lazarević signed a half-year deal with Liepāja. On 15 January 2022 he returned to Vojvodina, and signed a 2,5 year deal. On 15 July 2024, Lazarević signed a three-year deal with another SuperLiga club, Partizan.

== Career statistics ==
As of 22 December 2024

Appearances and goals by club, season and competition
Club	Season	League			Cup		Continental		Other		Total	
Club	Season	Division	Apps	Goals	Apps	Goals	Apps	Goals	Apps	Goals	Apps	Goals
Proleter Novi Sad (loan)	2015–16	Serbian First League	10	1	—		—		—		10	1
Proleter Novi Sad (loan)	2016–17	Serbian First League	27	0	1	0	—		—		28	0
Proleter Novi Sad (loan)	Total		37	1	1	0	—		—		38	1
Vojvodina	2016–17	Serbian SuperLiga	0	0	1	0	—		—		1	0
Vojvodina	2017–18	Serbian SuperLiga	9	0	1	0	—		—		10	0
Vojvodina	2018–19	Serbian SuperLiga	20	0	2	0	—		—		22	0
Vojvodina	2019–20	Serbian SuperLiga	0	0	0	0	—		—		0	0
Vojvodina	Total		29	0	4	0	—		—		33	0
Rad	2019–20	Serbian SuperLiga	10	0	0	0	—		—		10	0
Rad	2020–21	Serbian SuperLiga	32	2	1	0	—		—		33	2
Rad	Total		42	2	1	0	—		—		43	2
Liepāja	2021	Latvian Higher League	5	0	4	0	—		—		9	0
Vojvodina	2021–22	Serbian SuperLiga	15	1	2	0	0	0	—		17	1
Vojvodina	2022–23	Serbian SuperLiga	29	1	3	0	—		—		32	1
Vojvodina	2023–24	Serbian SuperLiga	32	1	5	0	2	0	—		39	1
Vojvodina	Total		76	3	10	0	2	0	—		88	3
Partizan	2024–25	Serbian SuperLiga	5	0	0	0	2	0	—		7	0
Career total			194	6	20	0	4	0	—		218	6
