= Igor Jeličić =

Serbian footballer (born 2000)

Personal information
- Full name: Igor Jeličić
- Date of birth: 28 February 2000 (age 26)
- Place of birth: Novi Sad, FR Yugoslavia
- Height: 1.87 m (6 ft 2 in)
- Position: Centre-back

Youth career
- 2011–2019: Vojvodina

Senior career*
Years	Team	Apps	(Gls)
2019–2024	Vojvodina	69	(0)
2020–2021	→ Kabel (loan)	29	(1)
2024–2026	Kristiansund	21	(0)
2026	→ Napredak (loan)	3	(0)

International career
2014–2015	Serbia U15	6	(0)
2016	Serbia U17	5	(0)
2018–2019	Serbia U19	11	(0)
- * Club domestic league appearances and goals as of 13 June 2026

Igor Jeličić (Serbian Cyrillic: Игор Јеличић; born 28 February 2000) is a Serbian professional footballer who plays as a central defender.

== Career statistics ==
=== Club ===
As of 7 June 2025

Club	Season	League			Cup		Continental		Other		Total	
Club	Season	Division	Apps	Goals	Apps	Goals	Apps	Goals	Apps	Goals	Apps	Goals
Vojvodina	2018–19	SuperLiga	0	0	0	0	—		—		0	0
Vojvodina	2021–22	SuperLiga	30	0	4	0	1	0	—		35	0
Vojvodina	2022–23	SuperLiga	28	0	2	0	—		—		30	0
Vojvodina	2023–24	SuperLiga	11	0	2	0	2	0	—		15	0
Vojvodina	2024–25	SuperLiga	0	0	0	0	0	0	—		0	0
Vojvodina	Total		69	0	8	0	3	0	—		80	0
Kabel (loan)	2020–21	Serbian First League	29	1	1	0	—		—		30	1
Kristiansund	2024	Eliteserien	9	0	0	0	—		—		9	0
Kristiansund	2025	Eliteserien	5	0	3	1	—		—		8	1
Kristiansund	Total		14	0	3	1	—		—		17	1
Career total			112	1	12	1	3	0	—		127	2
