= Ivan Vukčević =

Serbian footballer

Personal information
- Full name: Ivan Vukčević
- Date of birth: 4 December 2001 (age 24)
- Place of birth: Podgorica, Montenegro, FR Yugoslavia
- Height: 1.85 m (6 ft 1 in)
- Position: Forward

Team information
- Current team: Sutjeska Nikšić
- Number: 7

Youth career
- 2017–2018: Zeta

Senior career*
Years	Team	Apps	(Gls)
2018–2022	Zeta	95	(19)
2022–	Vojvodina	26	(1)
2023	→ Mladost GAT (loan)	14	(1)
2024–	→ Sutjeska Nikšić (loan)	59	(11)

International career^{‡}
2015	Montenegro U15	1	(0)
2017	Montenegro U17	10	(0)
2018	Montenegro U18	9	(2)
2018–2019	Montenegro U19	26	(5)
2021–2022	Montenegro U21	9	(2)
- * Club domestic league appearances and goals as of 17 June 2026 ‡ National team caps and goals as of 10 June 2022

Ivan Vukčević (Serbian Cyrillic: Иван Вукчевић; born 4 December 2001) is a Montenegrin professional footballer who plays as a forward for Montenegrin First League club Sutjeska Nikšić, on loan from Serbian SuperLiga club Vojvodina.

== Club career ==
=== Vojvodina ===
On 12 January 2022, he signed a 2 1/2-year contract with Serbian SuperLiga club Vojvodina.

== International career ==
Vukčević was called in Montenegro U15, Montenegro U17, Montenegro U18, Montenegro U19 and Montenegro U21 national team squads.

== Career statistics ==
As of 21 March 2026

Club	Season	League			Cup		Continental		Total	
Club	Season	Division	Apps	Goals	Apps	Goals	Apps	Goals	Apps	Goals
Zeta	2017–18	Montenegrin 1. CFL	3	0	0	0	—		3	0
Zeta	2018–19	Montenegrin 1. CFL	25	3	1	0	—		26	3
Zeta	2019–20	Montenegrin 1. CFL	26	4	2	0	2 (Note: Appearances in UEFA Europa League Qualifying rounds)	0	30	4
Zeta	2020–21	Montenegrin 1. CFL	25	4	1	1	2	1	28	6
Zeta	2021–22	Montenegrin 1. CFL	16	7	0	0	—		16	7
Zeta	Total		95	18	4	1	4	1	103	20
Vojvodina	2021–22	Serbian SuperLiga	16	1	2	1	—		18	2
Vojvodina	2022–23	Serbian SuperLiga	8	0	3	0	—		11	0
Vojvodina	2023–24	Serbian SuperLiga	2	0	0	0	2	0	4	0
Vojvodina	Total		26	1	5	1	2	0	33	2
Mladost GAT (loan)	2023–24	Serbian First League	14	1	1	0	—		15	1
Sutjeska Nikšić (loan)	2024–25	Montenegrin 1. CFL	33	6	1	0	—		34	6
Sutjeska Nikšić (loan)	2025–26	Montenegrin 1. CFL	17	3	1	1	4	1	22	5
Sutjeska Nikšić (loan)	Total		49	8	2	1	4	1	55	10
Career total			185	29	12	3	10	2	207	34
