= Milan Vidakov =

Serbian footballer

Personal information
- Date of birth: 19 August 2000 (age 26)
- Place of birth: Ruma, FR Yugoslavia
- Height: 1.84 m (6 ft 0 in)
- Position: Centre-forward

Team information
- Current team: Radnički Kragujevac
- Number: 90

Youth career
- Partizan
- 2018–2019: Vojvodina

Senior career*
Years	Team	Apps	(Gls)
2019–2023	Vojvodina	4	(0)
2019	→ OFK Vršac (loan)	15	(11)
2020–2021	→ Kabel (loan)	28	(5)
2021–2022	→ Mladost Novi Sad (loan)	33	(18)
2022–2023	→ Mladost Novi Sad (loan)	21	(2)
2023–	Radnički Kragujevac	38	(6)
- * Club domestic league appearances and goals as of 5 June 2026

Milan Vidakov (Serbian Cyrillic: Милан Видаков; born 19 August 2000) is a Serbian professional footballer who plays as a centre-forward for Radnički Kragujevac.

== Club career ==
=== Early career ===
Vidakov was a member of the younger selections of Belgrade's Partizan. At the beginning of 2018, he moved to Vojvodina from Novi Sad, and before the end of the same year, he signed a professional contract with the club.

=== Vojvodina ===
During the spring half of the 2018–19 Serbian SuperLiga, he was part of the first team of Vojvodina, but he played for the youth team until the end of the season. The following summer, he was loaned to OFK Vršac. With 11 goals in 15 games, Vidakov was the best scorer in the first part of the 2019–20 Serbian League Vojvodina. During the winter break, Vojvodina recalled him from his loan at Vršac and sent on loan to Serbian First League team Kabel. After one and a half seasons, Vidakov went to Mladost Novi Sad on another loan, in the summer of 2021. After winning the Serbian First League with Mladost Novi Sad, where he was the most efficient scorer of the competition, Vidakov returned to Vojvodina. On the last day of May 2022, he extended the contract until the end of the calendar year 2024.

=== Radnički Kragujevac ===
On 12 July 2023, Vidakov signed for a three-year deal with Radnički Kragujevac.

== Career statistics ==
As of match played 27 May 2023

Appearances and goals by club, season and competition
Club	Season	League			Cup		Continental		Total	
Club	Season	Division	Apps	Goals	Apps	Goals	Apps	Goals	Apps	Goals
Vojvodina	2019–20	Serbian SuperLiga	0	0	0	0	—		0	0
Vojvodina	2020–21	Serbian SuperLiga	0	0	0	0	—		0	0
Vojvodina	2021–22	Serbian SuperLiga	0	0	0	0	—		0	0
Vojvodina	2012–23	Serbian SuperLiga	4	0	0	0	—		4	0
Vojvodina	Total		4	0	0	0	—		4	0
OFK Vršac (loan)	2019–20	Serbian League Vojvodina	15	11	—		—		15	11
Kabel (loan)	2019–20	Serbian First League	6	1	—		—		6	1
Kabel (loan)	2020–21	Serbian First League	22	4	1	0	—		23	4
Kabel (loan)	Total		28	5	1	0	—		29	5
Mladost Novi Sad (loan)	2021–22	Serbian First League	33	18	—		—		33	18
Mladost Novi Sad (loan)	2022–23	Serbian SuperLiga	21	2	0	0	—		21	2
Mladost Novi Sad (loan)	Total		54	20	0	0	—		54	20
Radnički Kragujevac	2023–24	Serbian SuperLiga	0	0	0	0	—		0	0
Career total			101	36	1	0	0	0	102	36

== Honours ==
Mladost Novi Sad

- Serbian First League: 2021–22

Individual

- Serbian First League Top Scorer: 2021–22
- Serbian SuperLiga Player of the Week: 2023–24 (Round 15)
