= Yves Baraye =

Senegalese footballer (born 1992)

Personal information
- Full name: Bertrand Yves Baraye
- Date of birth: 21 June 1992 (age 34)
- Place of birth: Dakar, Senegal
- Height: 1.77 m (5 ft 10 in)
- Position: Winger

Team information
- Current team: Pro Patria

Youth career
- 2000–2009: Marseille
- 2009–2011: Udinese

Senior career*
Years	Team	Apps	(Gls)
2011–2013	Lumezzane	62	(8)
2013–2015	Chievo	0	(0)
2013–2014	→ Juve Stabia (loan)	19	(2)
2014–2015	→ Torres (loan)	36	(3)
2015–2020	Parma	98	(32)
2019	→ Padova (loan)	14	(2)
2019–2020	→ Gil Vicente (loan)	26	(3)
2020–2021	Gil Vicente	20	(1)
2022	Belenenses	13	(2)
2022–2023	Vojvodina	34	(5)
2023–2024	Marítimo	4	(0)
2024–2025	Ospitaletto	28	(7)
2025–2026	Desenzano	28	(6)
2026–	Pro Patria	0	(0)
- * Club domestic league appearances and goals as of 3 May 2026

Bertrand Yves Baraye (born 21 June 1992) is a Senegalese professional footballer who plays as a winger for Serie D club Pro Patria.

== Career ==
Baraye started his career at Marseille and then moved on to Udinese. He never appeared for the first team, as he was moved out to Lumezzane in 2011. In 2013, Chievo bought him outright for €100,000 from Lumezzane, only to send him out to Juve Stabia in a co-ownership deal for €500,000 (exchanged with 50% registration rights of Luca Martinelli for an undisclosed fee) In January 2014 Chievo bought back Baraye for an undisclosed fee, with Martinelli moved to opposite direction for an undisclosed fee; Juve Stabia also signed Vincenzo Carrotta for €400,000 in the same window.

In summer 2014 Baraye moved to Torres in a temporary deal. In 2015, Chievo released him and he signed for the newly reformed Parma.

On 31 January 2019, he joined Padova on loan with an option to buy.

On 2 September 2019, he joined Portuguese club Gil Vicente on loan.

On 12 June 2022, Baraye signed a two-year deal with Vojvodina.

On 23 August 2023, Baraye signed for recently-relegated to Liga Portugal 2 side Marítimo.

== Career statistics ==
As of 27 May 2024

Appearances and goals by club, season and competition
Club	Season	League			Cup		Continental		Other		Total	
Club	Season	Division	Apps	Goals	Apps	Goals	Apps	Goals	Apps	Goals	Apps	Goals
Lumezzane	2011-12	Lega Pro Prima Divisione	32	5	1	0	—		—		33	5
Lumezzane	2012-13	Lega Pro Prima Divisione	30	3	2	0	—		—		32	3
Lumezzane	2013-14	Lega Pro Prima Divisione	—		2	0	—		—		2	0
Lumezzane	Total		62	8	5	0	—		—		67	8
Juve Stabia (loan)	2013-14	Serie B	19	2	—		—		—		19	2
Torres (loan)	2014-15	Lega Pro	36	3	—		—		—		36	3
Parma	2015-16	Serie D	31	20	—		—		—		31	20
Parma	2016-17	Lega Pro	38	11	—		—		—		38	11
Parma	2017-18	Serie B	28	1	1	0	—		—		29	1
Parma	2018-19	Serie A	0	0	1	0	—		—		1	0
Parma	Total		97	32	2	0	—		—		99	32
Padova (loan)	2018-19	Serie B	14	2	—		—		—		14	2
Gil Vicente (loan)	2019-20	Primeira Liga	26	3	1	0	—		0	0	27	3
Gil Vicente	2020-21	Primeira Liga	20	1	2	0	—		—		22	1
Belenenses	2021-22	Primeira Liga	13	2	—		—		—		13	2
Vojvodina	2022-23	Serbian SuperLiga	34	5	3	0	—		—		37	5
Vojvodina	2023-24	Serbian SuperLiga	0	0	—		2 (Note: Appearance(s) in UEFA Europa Conference League)	0	—		2	0
Vojvodina	Total		34	5	3	0	2	0	—		39	5
Marítimo	2023-24	Liga Portugal 2	4	0	1	0	—		—		5	0
Career total			225	58	14	0	2	0	0	0	241	58
