= 2023–24 FK Novi Pazar season =

FK Novi Pazar
2023–24 season
- Manager: Siniša Dobrašinović
- Stadium: Novi Pazar City Stadium
- Serbian SuperLiga: 5th
- Serbian Cup: Quarter-finals
- Top goalscorer: League: Marko Obradović (5); All: Marko Obradović (6)
Home colours	Away colours

The 2023–24 season is FK Novi Pazar's 96th season in existence and fifth consecutive in the Serbian top division Serbian SuperLiga. They are also competing in the Serbian Cup.

== Players ==
=== First-team squad ===
As of 15 September 2023

Note: Flags indicate national team as defined under FIFA eligibility rules; some limited exceptions apply. Players may hold more than one non-FIFA nationality.

No.	Pos.	Nation	Player
1	GK	SRB	Nikola Mirković (vice-captain)
2	DF	SRB	Dragan Bojat
3	DF	EGY	Omar Fayed (on loan from Fenerbahçe)
4	DF	SRB	Nikola Andrić
5	MF	SRB	Semir Alić
6	MF	GUI	Abdoulaye Cissé
7	FW	MKD	Nikola Bogdanovski
8	MF	GRE	Nemanja Milojević
9	FW	SRB	Saša Jovanović
10	MF	CRO	Frane Čirjak
11	FW	BIH	Aleksej Golijanin
12	GK	MNE	Bojan Zogović
13	MF	NGR	Adetunji Adeshina
14	MF	SRB	Miljan Momčilović
17	FW	SRB	Nikola Karaklajić
19	DF	SRB	Ensar Brunčević

No.	Pos.	Nation	Player
20	MF	GUI	Seydouba Soumah (captain)
21	DF	SRB	Uroš Lazić (on loan from Red Star Belgrade)
22	MF	SRB	Mitar Ergelaš (on loan from Čukarički)
23	DF	SRB	Nemanja Kojčić
24	DF	POR	Rafael Floro
25	GK	SRB	Lazar Slavković
26	MF	KOR	Jo Jin-ho (on loan from Fenerbahçe)
30	GK	BIH	Bakir Brajlović
34	FW	RSA	Kurt Abrahams
44	FW	SRB	Marko Šćepović
55	DF	MNE	Emir Azemović
77	DF	GHA	Ebenezer Annan (on loan from Bologna)
80	FW	SRB	Filip Knežević
88	MF	SRB	Adem Ljajić
91	FW	MNE	Marko Obradović

== Transfers ==
=== In ===
Pos.	Player	Transferred from	Fee	Date	Source
MF	(Greece) Nemanja Milojević	(Serbia) Kolubara	Free	5 September 2023	
MF	(Serbia) Adem Ljajic	(Turkey) Fatih Karagümrük	Free	14 September 2023	
DF	(Egypt) Omar Fayed	(Turkey) Fenerbahçe	Loan	15 September 2023	

=== Out ===
Pos.	Player	Transferred to	Fee	Date	Source
DF	(Montenegro) Slobodan Rubežić	(Scotland) Aberdeen	€230,000	31 July 2023	

== Pre-season and friendlies ==
Win Draw Loss Fixtures

1 July 2023 Friendly	Novi Pazar (Serbia)	5–0	(Montenegro) Rudar Pljevlja
17:00 CEST (UTC+2)

5 July 2023 Friendly	Novi Pazar (Serbia)	1–1	(Bosnia and Herzegovina) Zvijezda 09
13:00 CEST (UTC+2)

8 July 2023 Friendly	Jedinstvo (Montenegro)	0–0	(Serbia) Novi Pazar	Zlatibor
18:00 CEST (UTC+2)				Stadium: Stadion Švajcarija

13 July 2023 Friendly	Voždovac (Serbia)	0–0	(Serbia) Novi Pazar	Zlatibor
16:30 CEST (UTC+2)				Stadium: Stadion Švajcarija

15 July 2023 Friendly	Novi Pazar (Serbia)	1–2	(United Arab Emirates) Al Wahda
18:00 CEST (UTC+2)

13 October 2023 Friendly	Novi Pazar (Serbia)	1–2	(Montenegro) Mladost Donja Gorica
15:30 CEST (UTC+2)

21 January 2024 Friendly	Radomiak Radom (Poland)	1–3	(Serbia) Novi Pazar	Lara, Turkey
13:00 CET (UTC+1)				Stadium: Miracle Resort Hotel Field 1

24 January 2024 Friendly	Debreceni VSC (Hungary)	0–0	(Serbia) Novi Pazar	Lara, Turkey
16:00 CET (UTC+1)				Stadium: Miracle Resort Hotel Training Center

27 January 2024 Friendly	Olimpija Ljubljana (Slovenia)	v	(Serbia) Novi Pazar
09:30 CET (UTC+1)

30 January 2024 Friendly	Jablonec (Czech Republic)	v	(Serbia) Novi Pazar
CET (UTC+1)

== Competitions ==
=== Overall record ===
Competition	First match	Last match	Starting round	Record							
Competition	First match	Last match	Starting round	Pld	W	D	L	GF	GA	GD	Win %
Serbian SuperLiga	22 July 2023	26 May 2024	Matchday 1	19	9	2	8	24	19	+5	47.37
Serbian Cup	1 November 2023		Round of 32	2	2	0	0	4	2	+2	100.00
Total				21	11	2	8	28	21	+7	52.38

Last updated: 22 December 2023
Source: Soccerway

=== Serbian SuperLiga ===
==== League table ====
Pos	Team	Pld	W	D	L	GF	GA	GD	Pts	Qualification
7	Mladost Lučani	30	11	7	12	30	40	−10	40	Qualification for the Championship round
8	Napredak Kruševac	30	11	6	13	31	39	−8	39	Qualification for the Championship round
9	Novi Pazar	30	10	6	14	35	40	−5	36	Qualification for the Relegation round
10	Spartak Subotica	30	10	4	16	29	44	−15	34	Qualification for the Relegation round
11	Radnički Niš	30	9	6	15	33	40	−7	33	Qualification for the Relegation round

Source: SuperLiga (in Serbian)
Rules for classification: 1) Points; 2) Head-to-head points; 3) Head-to-head goal difference; 4) Head-to-head goals scored; 5) Head-to-head away goals scored (if two teams tied); 6) Goal difference; 7) Goals scored; 8) Fair play ranking; 9) Draw.

==== Results summary ====
Overall								Home						Away					
Pld	W	D	L	GF	GA	GD	Pts	W	D	L	GF	GA	GD	W	D	L	GF	GA	GD
19	9	2	8	24	19	+5	29	7	0	3	16	9	+7	2	2	5	8	10	−2

Last updated: 22 December 2023.
Source: Soccerway

==== Results by round ====
Round	1	2	3	4	5	6	7	8	9	10	11	12	13	14	15	16	17	18	19	20
Ground	H	A	H	A	H	A	H	A	H	A	H	H	A	H	A	A	H	A	H	A
Result	W	L	L	D	W	L	W	L	L	L	W	W	D	L	W	W	W	L	W	
Position	2	8	11	11	9	11	7	10	11	12	10	8	8	10	9	5	5	5	5	

Updated to match(es) played on 22 December 2023. Source: Worldfootball
A = Away; H = Home; W = Win; D = Draw; L = Loss

==== Matches ====
30 July 2023 1	Novi Pazar	2–0	Radnički 1923	Novi Pazar
18:55	Karaklajić 67'; Šušnjar (yellow card) 73'; Obradović 90'	Report	Vidakov (yellow card) 42'; Chinedu (yellow card) 67'	Stadium: Novi Pazar City Stadium; Referee: Jovan Šegrt

5 August 2023 2	Javor	3–1	Novi Pazar	Ivanjica
18:00	Gigić 13'; Dolmagić (yellow card) 27'; Obradović 47'; Campbell 50'; Ratković (yellow card) 67'; Manojlović (yellow card) 84'; Bosić (yellow card) 90'	Report	Annan (yellow card) 5'; Adeshina (yellow card) 41', (goal) 56'; Andrić (yellow card) 46'; Karaklajić (yellow card) 70'; Čirjak (yellow card) 80'	Stadium: Javor Stadium; Attendance: 500; Referee: Novak Simović

14 August 2023 3	Novi Pazar	3–4	IMT	Novi Pazar
18:00	Adeshina 3'; Ergelaš 34'; Bojat (yellow card) 74'; Azemović 85'; Andrić (yellow card) 90'	Report	M. Luković 10', 81'; Kijevčanin (yellow card) 11'; L. Luković (yellow card) 49'; Kodžić (yellow card) 66'; Glišić 90'; Živojinović 90'	Stadium: Novi Pazar City Stadium; Attendance: 0 Referee: Nenad Minaković

20 August 2023 4	Radnik Surdulica	0–0	Novi Pazar	Surdulica
17:15	Gašic (yellow card) 76'	Report	Adeshina (yellow card) 65'; Andrić (yellow card) 88'	Stadium: Surdulica City Stadium; Attendance: 100; Referee: Pavle Ilić

27 August 2023 5	Novi Pazar	1–0	Železničar	Novi Pazar
17:30	Obradović 45'; Bogdanovski (yellow card) 90'	Report	Kovačević (yellow card) 32'; Pavlov (yellow card) 40'	Stadium: Novi Pazar City Stadium; Attendance: 3,400; Referee: Milan Mitić

2 September 2023 6	Red Star Belgrade	2–1	Novi Pazar	Belgrade
20:00	Dragović 8'; Kanga 80' (pen.); Rodić (yellow card) 90'; Stamenić (yellow card) 90'	Report	Adeshina (yellow card) 68'; Momčilović (yellow card) 78'; Sa. Jovanović 81'	Stadium: Rajko Mitić Stadium; Attendance: 23,000; Referee: Nikola Radaković

17 September 2023 7	Novi Pazar	2–1	Napredak Kruševac	Novi Pazar
17:00	Ergelaš 11'; Ljajić 67'; Andrić (yellow card) 85'	Report	Vukajlović (yellow card) 34'; Đeković (yellow card) 45'; Ljubomirac 57'	Stadium: Novi Pazar City Stadium; Attendance: 7,000; Referee: Lazar Lukić

23 September 2023 8	Mladost Lučani	2–0	Novi Pazar	Lučani
19:00	Eze 14' (pen.), 39'; Silue (yellow card) 27'; Sremčević (yellow card) 33'; Milošević (yellow card) 64'; Ćirković (yellow card) 90'	Report	Kojčić (yellow card) 7'; Adeshina (red card) 23'; Ljajić (yellow card) 45'; Milojević (yellow card) 86'	Stadium: Mladost Stadium; Referee: Aleksandar Živković

2 October 2023 10	Voždovac	1–0	Novi Pazar	Belgrade
19:00	Jočić (yellow card) 22'; Vaštšuk 74'	Report	Annan (yellow card) 5'	Stadium: Voždovac Stadium; Attendance: 300; Referee: Danilo Nikolić

7 October 2023 11	Novi Pazar	3–1	Vojvodina	Novi Pazar
16:00	Floro 56'; Ergelaš (yellow card) 61'; Karaklajić 77'; Adeshina 85'	Report	Bukinac (yellow card) 30'; Vukanović 82'	Stadium: Novi Pazar City Stadium; Attendance: 4,000; Referee: Srđan Jovanović I

20 October 2023 12	Novi Pazar	1–0	Čukarički	Novi Pazar
17:00	Azemović (yellow card) 30'; Cissé (yellow card) 57'; Lazić (yellow card) 79'; Obradović 81'; Floro (yellow card) 85'	Report	Rogan (yellow card) 25'; Adetunji (yellow card) 44'; Nikčević (yellow card) 63'; Stanković (yellow card) 87'	Stadium: Novi Pazar City Stadium; Attendance: 0 Referee: Novak Simović

29 October 2023 13	TSC	1–1	Novi Pazar	Bačka Topola
19:00	Stojić (yellow card) 31'; Vulić (yellow card) 41'; Milovanović 83'; Cvetković (yellow card) 85'	Report	Adeshina (yellow card) 44'; Jin-ho (yellow card) 51'; Lazić 55', (yellow card) 90'; Floro (yellow card) 57'; Čirjak (yellow card) 82'; Cissé (yellow card) 85'; Ergelaš (yellow card) 85'; Soumah (yellow card) 90'	Stadium: TSC Arena; Attendance: 1,700; Referee: Aleksandar Živković

6 November 2023 14	Novi Pazar	0–1	Partizan	Novi Pazar
15:00	Karaklajić (yellow card) 22'; Mirković (yellow card) 25'; Soumah (yellow card) 71'	Report	Severina 2'; Belić (yellow card) 70'; Stevanović (red card) 90'	Stadium: Novi Pazar City Stadium; Referee: Miloš Milanović

11 November 2023 15	Radnički Niš	0–1	Novi Pazar	Niš
17:00	Stojanović (yellow card) 90'	Report	Jin-ho 69'	Stadium: Čair Stadium; Attendance: 400; Referee: Srđan Jovanović I

26 November 2023 16	Radnički 1923	0–4	Novi Pazar	Kragujevac
13:00	Vidakov (yellow card) 41'	Report	Obradović 14', 17'; Soumah 61'; Ljajić 82'	Stadium: Čika Dača Stadium; Attendance: 1,000; Referee: Lazar Lukić

1 December 2023 17	Novi Pazar	2–0	Javor	Novi Pazar
16:30	Azemović (yellow card) 34'; Obradović (yellow card) 40'; Soumah 47'; Šćepović 90'	Report	Gigić (yellow card) 45'; Obradović (yellow card) 49'; Doucouré (yellow card) 53'; Miletić (yellow card) 53'; Kopitović (red card) 78'	Stadium: Novi Pazar City Stadium; Referee: Nikola Đorđević

10 December 2023 18	IMT	1–0	Novi Pazar	Belgrade
17:00	Zuyev (yellow card) 25'; M. Luković 46'; Lambulić (yellow card) 81'; Gordić (yellow card) 89'; Radočaj (yellow card) 90'	Report	Karaklajić (yellow card) 44'; Fayed (yellow card) 80'; Ljajić (yellow card) 90'	Stadium: Voždovac Stadium; Referee: David Matić

15 December 2023 19	Novi Pazar	2–1	Radnik Surdulica	Novi Pazar
16:00	Cissé 9'; Ljajić 39' (pen.)	Report	Oreščanin (yellow card) 53'; Milićević 84'; Abubakar (red card) 86'	Stadium: Novi Pazar City Stadium; Referee: Ivan Stamenković

21 December 2023 9	Novi Pazar	0–1	Spartak Subotica	Novi Pazar
15:00	Ergelaš (yellow card) 57'; Cissé (yellow card) 65'	Report	Tosheski (yellow card) 70'; Tanasijević (yellow card) 79'; Ubiparip 86'	Stadium: Novi Pazar City Stadium; Referee: Milan Mitić
Note: The match was postponed due to mourning day and security concerns after Banjska attack on 24 September.

10 February 2024 20	Železničar	2–2	Novi Pazar	Pančevo
13:00	Đorđević 8', (yellow card) 78'; Knežević (yellow card) 31'; Stanković (yellow card) 38'; Romanić 45'	Report	Cissé (yellow card) 27'; Ljajić (yellow card) 31'; Karaklajić 33'; Annan (yellow card) 39'; Fayed (yellow card) 40'; Brunčević (yellow card) 42'; Soumah (yellow card) 90', (goal) 90' (pen.)	Stadium: SC Mladost Stadium; Attendance: 2,200; Referee: Ivan Stamenković

17 February 2024 21	Novi Pazar	0–3	Red Star Belgrade	Novi Pazar
14:00	Soumah (yellow card) 32'; Annan (yellow card) 55'	Report	Dragović 10'; Kanga 40' (pen.), (yellow card) 85'; Djiga (yellow card) 72'; Ndiaye 81'	Stadium: Novi Pazar City Stadium; Referee: Danilo Nikolić

25 February 2024 22	Napredak Kruševac	3–1	Novi Pazar	Kruševac
16:30	Mršić 18', (yellow card) 70'; Majdevac 35' (pen.); Bastajić 40'; Zličić (yellow card) 45'; St. Jovanović (yellow card) 64'; Krstić (yellow card) 77'; Marinković (yellow card) 81'; Ljubomirac (yellow card) 84'	Report	Ljajić 45' (pen.); Cissé (red card) 90'	Stadium: Mladost Stadium; Attendance: 3,500; Referee: Nenad Minaković

=== Serbian Cup ===
1 November 2023 Round of 32	Železničar	0–1	Novi Pazar	Pančevo
17:00		Report	Azemović (yellow card) 33'; Obradović 77'	Stadium: SC Mladost; Attendance: 1,000; Referee: Andrija Stojanović

5 December 2023 Round of 16	Inđija	2–3	Novi Pazar	Inđija
13:00	Kojić 28'; Radosavljević 29'; Mitrović (yellow card) 41'; Vuković (yellow card) 74'	Report	Bogdanovski 6'; Ergelaš 17' (pen.), 21'; Andrić (yellow card) 53'; Annan (yellow card) 76'	Stadium: Inđija Stadium; Attendance: 200; Referee: Pavle Tomić

10 April 2024 Quarter-finals	Radnički 1923	v	Novi Pazar	Kragujevac
				Stadium: Čika Dača Stadium
