= 2023–24 FK Javor Ivanjica season =

Serbian club football season

FK Javor Ivanjica
2023–24 season
- Manager: Radovan Ćurčić
- Stadium: Javor Stadium
- Serbian SuperLiga: 12th
- Serbian Cup: Round of 16
- Top goalscorer: League: Ibrahim Tanko (5); All: Ibrahim Tanko (5)

2023–24 FK Javor Ivanjica season is the club's 114th season in history and its second consecutive season in the Serbian SuperLiga. The also participated in the Serbian Cup being knocked out in the round of 16.

== Players ==
=== First-team squad ===
As of 10 February 2024

Note: Flags indicate national team as defined under FIFA eligibility rules; some limited exceptions apply. Players may hold more than one non-FIFA nationality.

No.	Pos.	Nation	Player
1	GK	SRB	Lazar Raičević
2	DF	SRB	Milan Ilić
3	DF	SRB	Milan Obradović
4	MF	BRA	Leandro Pinto
7	MF	SRB	Luka Ratković
8	MF	SRB	Luka Gojković
9	FW	GHA	Ibrahim Tanko
10	MF	SRB	Radivoj Bosić
11	DF	SRB	Stefan Milošević
12	GK	SRB	Nikola Popović
13	MF	SRB	Dino Dolmagić
16	DF	MNE	Boris Kopitović
17	DF	SRB	Nemanja Miletić (captain)

No.	Pos.	Nation	Player
19	MF	BRA	Eliomar
20	DF	FRA	Boubacari Doucouré
22	DF	BIH	Kristijan Tojčić
26	DF	SRB	Đorđe Skoko
27	FW	CIV	Bayéré Junior Loué
29	FW	SRB	Jovan Goronjić
31	MF	BIH	Todor Petrović
33	MF	SRB	Lazar Selenić
98	GK	SRB	Strahinja Manojlović
—	DF	SRB	Stefan Marjanović
—	MF	SRB	Luka Petrovic
—	MF	SRB	Lazar Mićić

=== Out on loan ===
Note: Flags indicate national team as defined under FIFA eligibility rules; some limited exceptions apply. Players may hold more than one non-FIFA nationality.

No.	Pos.	Nation	Player
—	DF	SRB	Kosta Janjić (at FAP)
—	MF	SRB	Željko Basarić (at Real Podunavci)

No.	Pos.	Nation	Player
—	MF	SRB	Ognjen Luković (at Real Podunavci)
—	FW	SRB	Aleksa Beskorvajni (at Trayal)

== Transfers ==
=== In ===
Pos.	Player	Transferred from	Fee	Date	Source
DF	(Brazil) Leandro Pinto	(Serbia) Kolubara	Free	19 January 2024	
MF	(Serbia) Lazar Mićić	(Serbia) TSC	Free	19 January 2024	

=== Out ===
Pos.	Player	Transferred to	Fee	Date	Source
GK	(Serbia) Aleksandar Vulić	(Serbia) Spartak Subotica	Free	1 July 2023	
FW	(Ghana) Johnson Kofi Amuzu	(Serbia) Radnički Sremska Mitrovica	Loan	19 January 2024	

== Pre-season and friendlies ==
Win Draw Loss Fixtures

28 June 2024 Friendly	Javor (Serbia)	2–0	(Serbia) Mladost Lučani

22 July 2023 Friendly	Javor (Serbia)	0–0	(Serbia) Sloboda Užice

15 August 2023 Friendly	Javor (Serbia)	2–0	(United Arab Emirates) Al Dhafra

18 November 2023 Friendly	Javor (Serbia)	1–1	(Serbia) Mladost Lucani

24 January 2024 Friendly	Javor (Serbia)	2–0	(Bulgaria) FK Bdin Vidin

26 January 2024 Friendly	Veres Rivne (Ukraine)	Cancelled	(Serbia) Javor

27 January 2024 Friendly	Domžale (Slovenia)	3–1	(Serbia) Javor

30 January 2024 Friendly	Rogaška (Slovenia)	1–1	(Serbia) Javor

3 February 2024 Friendly	Javor (Serbia)	0–0	(Serbia) FK Metalac

== Competitions ==
=== Overall record ===
Competition	First match	Last match	Starting round	Final position	Record							
Competition	First match	Last match	Starting round	Final position	Pld	W	D	L	GF	GA	GD	Win %
Serbian SuperLiga	29 July 2023	14 April 2024	Matchday 1		20	6	3	11	21	29	−8	30.00
Serbian Cup	1 November 2023	6 December 2023	Round of 32	Round of 16	2	0	1	1	2	5	−3	0.00
Total					22	6	4	12	23	34	−11	27.27

Last updated: 10 February 2024
Source: Soccerway

=== Serbian SuperLiga ===
==== League table ====
Pos	Team	Pld	W	D	L	GF	GA	GD	Pts	Qualification
11	Radnički Niš	30	9	6	15	33	40	−7	33	Qualification for the Relegation round
12	IMT	30	9	5	16	34	47	−13	32	Qualification for the Relegation round
13	Javor-Matis	30	9	4	17	28	45	−17	31	Qualification for the Relegation round
14	Voždovac	30	7	9	14	38	48	−10	30	Qualification for the Relegation round
15	Železničar	30	7	5	18	34	59	−25	26	Qualification for the Relegation round

Source: SuperLiga (in Serbian)
Rules for classification: 1) Points; 2) Head-to-head points; 3) Head-to-head goal difference; 4) Head-to-head goals scored; 5) Head-to-head away goals scored (if two teams tied); 6) Goal difference; 7) Goals scored; 8) Fair play ranking; 9) Draw.

Pos	Team	Pld	W	D	L	GF	GA	GD	Pts	Qualification	RSB	PAR	TSC	VOJ	RDK	CUK	MLA	NAP
1	Red Star Belgrade (C)	37	31	3	3	94	28	+66	96	Qualification for the Champions League play-off round		3–2	2–1		3–2	4–1		
2	Partizan	37	24	6	7	80	48	+32	78	Qualification for the Champions League second qualifying round			1–2	2–3	2–2		3–0	
3	TSC	37	22	9	6	75	39	+36	75	Qualification for the Europa League play-off round (Note: The winner of the 2023–24 Serbian Cup, Red Star Belgrade, has already qualified for 2024–25 UEFA Champions League, so the berth is awarded to third place TSC.)				3–2	4–3	2–0		6–0
4	Vojvodina	37	17	10	10	62	50	+12	61	Qualification for the Europa League second qualifying round	0–0					2–3	1–0	5–0
5	Radnički 1923	37	19	4	14	64	61	+3	61	Qualification for the Conference League second qualifying round				0–0		4–3	3–2	
6	Čukarički	37	16	9	12	57	47	+10	57			0–1					4–1	2–0
7	Mladost Lučani	37	13	7	17	38	53	−15	46		0–1		2–0					3–1
8	Napredak Kruševac	37	11	7	19	36	66	−30	40		0–4	3–3			1–4			

Source: SuperLiga (in Serbian)
Legend: Blue = home team win; Yellow = draw; Red = away team win.
Rules for classification: 1) Points; 2) Points in regular season; 3) Head-to-head points in regular season; 4) Head-to-head goal difference in regular season; 5) Head-to-head goals scored in regular season; 6) Head-to-head away goals scored in regular season (if two teams tied); 7) Goal difference; 8) Goals scored; 9) Fair play ranking; 10) Drawing of lots.
(C) Champions
Notes:

Pos	Team	Pld	W	D	L	GF	GA	GD	Pts	Qualification or relegation	NPZ	SPA	IMT	RNI	JAV	ŽEL	VOŽ	RSU
3	IMT	37	11	9	17	43	53	−10	42		0–1					0–0	2–1	5–2
4	Radnički Niš	37	11	8	18	40	48	−8	41				0–0		1–2		2–0	1–0
5	Javor-Matis (R)	37	11	7	19	34	51	−17	40	Qualification for the play-off			1–1			1–1	1–1	
6	Železničar (O)	37	10	9	18	47	65	−18	39	Qualification for the play-off	3–1			1–1				4–0
7	Voždovac (R)	37	9	11	17	46	58	−12	38	Relegation to Serbian First League		0–0				2–3		3–2

Updated to match(es) played on 24 May 2024. Source: SuperLiga (in Serbian)
Legend: Blue = home team win; Yellow = draw; Red = away team win.
Rules for classification: 1) Points; 2) Points in regular season; 3) Head-to-head points in regular season; 4) Head-to-head goal difference in regular season; 5) Head-to-head goals scored in regular season; 6) Head-to-head away goals scored in regular season (if two teams tied); 7) Goal difference; 8) Goals scored; 9) Fair play ranking; 10) Drawing of lots.
(O) Play-off winners; (R) Relegated

==== Results summary ====
Overall								Home						Away					
Pld	W	D	L	GF	GA	GD	Pts	W	D	L	GF	GA	GD	W	D	L	GF	GA	GD
20	6	3	11	21	29	−8	21	5	1	4	14	11	+3	1	2	7	7	18	−11

Last updated: 10 February 2024.
Source: Soccerway

==== Results by round ====
Round	1	2	3	4	5	6	7	8	9	10	11	12	13	14	15	16	17	18	19
Ground	A	H	A	H	A	H	A	A	H	A	H	A	H	A	H	H	A	H	A
Result	D	W	D	L	L	W	L	L	D	W	W	L	L	L	W	W	L	L	L
Position	8	5	6	10	11	7	9	13	12	9	7	9	11	12	11	9	10	11	12

Updated to match(es) played on 10 February 2024. Source:
A = Away; H = Home; W = Win; D = Draw; L = Loss

==== Matches ====
29 July 2023 1	Voždovac	0–0	Javor	Belgrade
21:00 CEST (UTC+2)				Stadium: Voždovac Stadium; Referee: Danilo Nikolić

5 August 2023 2	Javor	3–1	Novi Pazar	Ivanjica
18:00 CEST (UTC+2)	Gigić 13'; Dolmagić (yellow card) 27'; Obradović 47'; Campbell 50'; Ratković (yellow card) 67'; Manojlović (yellow card) 84'; Bosić (yellow card) 90'	Report	Annan (yellow card) 5'; Adeshina (yellow card) 41', (goal) 56'; Andrić (yellow card) 46'; Karaklajić (yellow card) 70'; Čirjak (yellow card) 80'	Stadium: Javor Stadium; Attendance: 500; Referee: Novak Simović

12 August 2023 3	Čukarički	2–2	Javor	Belgrade
21:00 CEST (UTC+2)	Miladinović 15'; Drezgić 70'	Report	Tanko 18'; Gojković 81' (pen.)	Stadium: Čukarički Stadium; Attendance: 400; Referee: Aleksandar Živković

1 December 2023 17	Novi Pazar	2–0	Javor	Novi Pazar
16:30 CET (UTC+1)	Azemović (yellow card) 34'; Obradović (yellow card) 40'; Soumah 47'; Šćepović 90'	Report	Gigić (yellow card) 45'; Obradović (yellow card) 49'; Doucouré (yellow card) 53'; Miletić (yellow card) 53'; Kopitović (red card) 78'	Stadium: Novi Pazar City Stadium; Referee: Nikola Đorđević

10 December 2023 18	Javor	1–2	Čukarički	Ivanjica
15:00 CET (UTC+1)	Bosić 55'	Report	Ivanović 8'; Stanković 88'	Stadium: Javor Stadium; Referee: Aleksandar Živković

=== Serbian Cup ===
1 November 2023 Round of 32	IMT	1–1 (2–4 p)	Javor	Belgrade
15:00 CET (UTC+1)	Luković 85' (pen.)	Report	Gigić 68'	Stadium: Voždovac Stadium; Referee: Milan Ilić
