= 2024–25 FK Novi Pazar season =

FK Novi Pazar
2024–25 season
- Manager: Nikola Trajković
- Stadium: Novi Pazar City Stadium
- Serbian SuperLiga: 6th
- Serbian Cup: Pre-season
- Top goalscorer: League: Adem Ljajić (2); All: Adem Ljajić (2)

The 2024–25 season is the 97th year in the history of FK Novi Pazar, and the club's fifth consecutive season in Serbian SuperLiga. In addition to the domestic league, the team is scheduled to participate in the Serbian Cup.

== Squad ==
As of 20 July 2024

Note: Flags indicate national team as defined under FIFA eligibility rules; some limited exceptions apply. Players may hold more than one non-FIFA nationality.

No.	Pos.	Nation	Player
2	DF	SRB	Dragan Bojat
3	DF	SRB	Nemanja Miletić
4	DF	SRB	Ognjen Mršić
5	MF	SRB	Semir Alić
6	DF	NGR	Toheeb Dare Bamigboye
7	FW	SRB	Viktor Živojinović
8	MF	SRB	Sead Islamović
9	MF	SRB	Aleksandar Mesarović
13	MF	NGR	Adetunji Rasaq Adeshina
14	MF	SRB	Darko Stojanović
15	DF	SRB	Filip Bačkulja
16	FW	NGR	Ejike Julius Opara
20	MF	GUI	Seydouba Soumah (captain)
22	MF	SRB	Adem Ljajić
23	FW	SRB	Irfan Kahrović

No.	Pos.	Nation	Player
24	DF	POR	Rafael Floro
25	GK	NGR	Ajia Soliu Yakub
27	FW	SRB	Ognjen Bjeličić
29	FW	SRB	Darko Isailović
31	DF	SRB	Luka Čermelj
33	DF	SRB	Ivan Lakićević
44	FW	SRB	Marko Šćepović
71	GK	SRB	Filip Pajović
—	FW	NED	Rodney Antwi
80	FW	SRB	Filip Knežević
—	MF	SRB	Aleksandar Kovačević
—	MF	RSA	Kurt Abrahams
—	GK	SRB	Ivan Kostić
—	FW	SRB	Stefan Dimić

=== Out on loan ===
Note: Flags indicate national team as defined under FIFA eligibility rules; some limited exceptions apply. Players may hold more than one non-FIFA nationality.

No.	Pos.	Nation	Player
—	GK	SRB	Lazar Slavković (at Budućnost Dobanovci)
—	GK	BIH	Bakir Brajlović (at FK Goražde)

No.	Pos.	Nation	Player
—	FW	SRB	Ibrahim Fijuljanin (at Zlatibor Čajetina)
—	FW	SRB	Savo Arambašić (at Metalac)

== Transfers ==
=== In ===
Pos.	Player	Transferred from	Fee	Date	Source
DF	(Serbia) Ognjen Mršić	(Serbia) Napredak Kruševac	Free	1 July 2024	
DF	(Serbia) Ognjen Bjeličić	(Malta) Ħamrun Spartans	Undisclosed	1 July 2024	
DF	(Serbia) Nemanja Miletić	(Serbia) Javor Ivanjica	Free	1 July 2024	
DF	(Ghana) Ebenezer Annan	(Italy) Bologna	€350,000	1 July 2024	
DF	(Serbia) Darko Isailović	(Serbia) Radnički Sremska Mitrovica	Free	1 July 2024	
MF	(Serbia) Darko Stojanović	(Serbia) FK IMT	Free	1 July 2024	
FW	(Netherlands) Rodney Antwi	(Malta) Hibernians	Free	1 July 2024	
MF	(Serbia) Ivan Lakićević	(Serbia) Železničar Pančevo	Free	2 July 2024	
DF	(Serbia) Filip Bačkulja	(Serbia) Metalac Gornji Milanovac	Undisclosed	5 July 2024	
MF	(Serbia) Aleksandar Kovačević	(Serbia) Železničar Pančevo	Free	18 July 2024	

=== Out ===
Pos.	Player	Transferred to	Fee	Date	Source
DF	(Serbia) Daris Karišik	(Serbia) FK FAP	Undisclosed	1 July 2024	
MF	(Guinea) Abdoulaye Cissé	(Israel) Hapoel Hadera		1 July 2024	
GK	(Serbia) Nikola Mirković	(Serbia) Čukarički	Undisclosed	1 July 2024	
FW	(Montenegro) Marko Obradović	(Serbia) Napredak Kruševac		1 July 2024	
DF	(Montenegro) Emir Azemović			1 July 2024	
DF	(Ghana) Ebenezer Annan	(Serbia) Red Star Belgrade	€550,000	1 July 2024	

== Friendlies ==
=== Pre-season ===
4 July 2024 Friendly	Novi Pazar (Serbia)	2–2	(Cyprus) APOEL	Zlatibor, Serbia
18:00				Stadium: Stadion Švajcarija

7 July 2024 Friendly	Novi Pazar (Serbia)	0–1	(Russia) Pari Nizhny Novgorod
19:00 UTC+3			Magkeev 25'

11 July 2024 Friendly	Novi Pazar (Serbia)	2–0	(Montenegro) OFK Petrovac
19:30 UTC+2

== Competitions ==
=== Overall record ===
Competition	First match	Last match	Starting round	Record							
Competition	First match	Last match	Starting round	Pld	W	D	L	GF	GA	GD	Win %
Serbian SuperLiga	21 July 2024		Matchday 1	30	11	7	12	46	54	−8	36.67
Serbian Cup				0	0	0	0	0	0	+0	—
Total				30	11	7	12	46	54	−8	36.67

Last updated: 13 April 2025
Source: Soccerway

=== Serbian SuperLiga ===
==== League table ====
Pos	Team	Pld	W	D	L	GF	GA	GD	Pts	Qualification
6	Mladost Lučani	30	11	9	10	32	35	−3	42	Qualification for the Championship round
7	TSC	30	12	5	13	47	44	+3	41	Qualification for the Championship round
8	Novi Pazar	30	11	7	12	46	54	−8	40	Qualification for the Championship round
9	Čukarički	30	10	9	11	37	40	−3	39	Qualification for the Relegation round
10	IMT	30	10	7	13	37	46	−9	37	Qualification for the Relegation round

Source: SuperLiga (in Serbian)
Rules for classification: 1) Points; 2) Head-to-head points; 3) Head-to-head goal difference; 4) Head-to-head goals scored; 5) Head-to-head away goals scored (if two teams tied); 6) Goal difference; 7) Goals scored; 8) Fair play ranking; 9) Draw.

==== Results summary ====
Overall								Home						Away					
Pld	W	D	L	GF	GA	GD	Pts	W	D	L	GF	GA	GD	W	D	L	GF	GA	GD
31	12	7	12	48	55	−7	43	7	3	5	29	30	−1	5	4	7	19	25	−6

Last updated: 13 April 2025.
Source: soccerway

==== Results by round ====
Round	1	2	3	4	5	6	7	8	9	10	11	12	13	14	15	16	17	18	19	20	21	22	23	24	25	26	27	28	29	30	31	32	33	34	35	36	37
Ground	H	A	H	A	H	A	H	H	A	H	A	H	A	H	A	A	H	A	H	A	H	A	A	H	A	H	A	H	A	H	A	H	A	H	A	H	A
Result	W	W	D	L	L	L	W	D	L	W	L	L	W	W	L	D	L	D	L	W	L	W	D	W	L	W	L	W	D	D	W						
Position	4	6	4	7	9	12	8	8	11	7	10	11	10	8	10	10	11	10	11	10	11	10	8	8	8	8	9	7	8	8	6						

Updated to match(es) played on 13 April 2025. Source: worldfootball
A = Away; H = Home; W = Win; D = Draw; L = Loss

==== Matches ====
The match schedule was released on 10 June 2024.

21 July 2024 1	Novi Pazar	3–2	Spartak Subotica	Novi Pazar
17:30 UTC+2	Adeshina 23'; Lakićević (yellow card) 25'; Ljajić 31', 78'; Bjeličić (yellow card) 50'; Alić (yellow card) 64'; Bačkulja (yellow card) 74'		Bogićević (yellow card) 30'; Todoroski (yellow card) 39'; Ubiparip 83'; Atule 90+2'	Stadium: Novi Pazar City Stadium; Referee: Milan Stefanović

3 August 2024 3	Novi Pazar	0–0	OFK Beograd	Novi Pazar
17:30 CEST	Semir Alić (yellow card) 70'	Report	Vujadinović (yellow card) 13'; Aleksa Cvetković (yellow card) 37'	Stadium: Novi Pazar City Stadium; Referee: (Serbia) Stefan Jeknić

10 August 2024 4	Red Star Belgrade	4–1	Novi Pazar	Belgrade
20:00 CEST	Seol Young-woo 9'; Bruno Duarte 60'; Elšnik 80'; Mimović (yellow card) 81'; Rodríguez 86'	Report	Mesarović (yellow card) 10'; Bačkulja (yellow card) 18'; Adeshina (yellow card) 40'; Ejike Julius Opara 51'; Sead Islamović (yellow card) 60'	Stadium: Rajko Mitić Stadium; Attendance: 8,174; Referee: (Serbia) Nikola Radaković

17 August 2024 5	Novi Pazar	0–1	Mladost Lučani	Novi Pazar
17:30 CEST	Mesarović (yellow card) 33'; Adeshina (yellow card) 88'	Report	Ognjen Krsmanović 29'; Andrić (yellow card) 90+3'	Stadium: Novi Pazar City Stadium; Attendance: 1,700; Referee: (Serbia) David Matić

24 August 2024 6	Tekstilac Odžaci	2–1	Novi Pazar	Bačka Palanka
19:00 CEST	Dejan Đurić 10'; Nikola Kodžić (yellow card) 24'; Leontije Vasić (yellow card) 83'; Stefan Šavija 85'	Report	Sead Islamović (yellow card) 44'; Bačkulja 54'	Stadium: Slavko Maletin Vava Stadium; Attendance: 300; Referee: (Serbia) Andrija Stojanović

31 August 2024 7	Novi Pazar	3–1	Jedinstvo Ub	Novi Pazar
17:00 CEST	Ljajić 26' (pen.) 48' (yellow card) 57'; Sead Islamović (yellow card) 45+2'; Ejike Julius Opara (yellow card) 57'; Đuranović (yellow card) 72'; Mesarović 80'	Report	Tomás Agustín Pérez 3'; Kristoffersen (yellow card) 71'; Strahinja Rakić (yellow card) 86'	Stadium: Novi Pazar City Stadium; Attendance: 1,500; Referee: (Serbia) Novak Simović
