= 2024–25 FK Mladost Lučani season =

Mladost Lučani
2024–25 season
- Chairman: Vladimir Đorđević
- Manager: (Serbia) Nikola Trajković
- Stadium: Mladost Stadium
Home colours	Away colours

The 2024–25 season is the 73rd season in the history of FK Mladost Lučani.During this season the club will participate in the following competitions: Serbian SuperLiga, Serbian Cup.

== Players ==
=== First-team squad ===
As of 14 February 2025

Note: Flags indicate national team as defined under FIFA eligibility rules; some limited exceptions apply. Players may hold more than one non-FIFA nationality.

No.	Pos.	Nation	Player
1	GK	SRB	Saša Stamenković
4	DF	SRB	Miloš Divac
5	DF	SRB	Aleksa Milošević
6	MF	SRB	Jagoš Đurković
7	DF	SRB	Nikola Andrić
8	MF	MNE	Janko Tumbasević (captain)
10	FW	SRB	Petar Bojić
11	FW	SRB	Ognjen Bondžulić
12	DF	SRB	Milan Joksimović
14	FW	SRB	Danilo Načić
15	MF	SRB	Đorđe Marinković
17	MF	SRB	Aleksandar Varjačić
18	MF	SRB	Filip Žunić
20	DF	SRB	Ognjen Vučićević
21	GK	SRB	Bogdan Matijašević
22	FW	SRB	Ognjen Krsmanović
23	GK	SRB	Luka Savić

No.	Pos.	Nation	Player
25	FW	SRB	Jovan Ćirić
28	MF	SRB	Aleksandar Pejović
29	FW	SRB	Nikola Jojić (on loan from Stoke City)
30	DF	SRB	Nikola Ćirković
31	FW	SRB	Ognjen Alempijević
33	MF	SRB	Žarko Udovičić
35	DF	SRB	Nikola Leković
36	FW	SRB	Đuro Zec
39	DF	SRB	Vuk Bogdanović
40	DF	SRB	Dušan Cvetinović
43	DF	SRB	Vladimir Golemić
44	FW	COL	Dilan Ortíz
45	FW	NGA	Patrick Friday Eze
77	FW	SRB	Uroš Ljubomirac
87	DF	SRB	Danilo Petrović
93	DF	SRB	Igor Radovanović

=== Other players under contract ===
Note: Flags indicate national team as defined under FIFA eligibility rules; some limited exceptions apply. Players may hold more than one non-FIFA nationality.

No.	Pos.	Nation	Player
—	DF	SRB	Mihajlo Vesnić

=== Out on loan ===
Note: Flags indicate national team as defined under FIFA eligibility rules; some limited exceptions apply. Players may hold more than one non-FIFA nationality.

No.	Pos.	Nation	Player
—	GK	SRB	Željko Samčović (at Novi Pazar)
—	DF	SRB	Nikola Obućina (at FAP)
—	DF	SRB	Veljko Vlašković (at Zlatibor Čajetina)
—	DF	SRB	Nemanja Žunić (at Javor Ivanjica)
—	DF	SRB	Nenad Perović (at OFK Vršac)
—	MF	SRB	Vasilije Đerković (at Sloga Kraljevo)

No.	Pos.	Nation	Player
—	MF	SRB	Veljko Todorović (at FAP)
—	MF	SRB	Milisav Ćirović (at Sloga Požega)
—	MF	SRB	Sava Pribaković (at FAP)
—	FW	SRB	Đorđe Jakovljević (at Takovo)
—	FW	SRB	Mateja Milosavljević (at FAP)
—	FW	SRB	Ognjen Milanović (at Sloga Požega)

== Non-competitive ==
=== Club Friendlies ===
6 September 2024 Friendly	Mladost Lučani (Serbia)	1-0	(Montenegro) Budućnost
17:30	Ljubomir Đurović 48' (o.g.)	Report

== Competitive ==
=== Serbian SuperLiga ===
==== League table ====
Pos	Team	Pld	W	D	L	GF	GA	GD	Pts	Qualification
4	Radnički 1923	30	13	6	11	47	40	+7	45	Qualification for the Championship round
5	Vojvodina	30	11	9	10	48	40	+8	42	Qualification for the Championship round
6	Mladost Lučani	30	11	9	10	32	35	−3	42	Qualification for the Championship round
7	TSC	30	12	5	13	47	44	+3	41	Qualification for the Championship round
8	Novi Pazar	30	11	7	12	46	54	−8	40	Qualification for the Championship round

Source: SuperLiga (in Serbian)
Rules for classification: 1) Points; 2) Head-to-head points; 3) Head-to-head goal difference; 4) Head-to-head goals scored; 5) Head-to-head away goals scored (if two teams tied); 6) Goal difference; 7) Goals scored; 8) Fair play ranking; 9) Draw.

Pos	Team	Pld	W	D	L	GF	GA	GD	Pts	Qualification	RSB	PAR	NPZ	OFK	RDK	VOJ	TSC	MLA
4	OFK Beograd	37	15	8	14	53	54	−1	53	Ineligible for European competitions (Note: OFK Beograd qualified for the second qualifying round of the UEFA Conference League but failed to obtain a UEFA license. As a result, the berth was given to the fifth place Radnički 1923.)			2–3		3–0	1–2		1–0
5	Radnički 1923	37	15	8	14	60	53	+7	53	Qualification for the Conference League second qualifying round	4–1		2–3				5–2	1–1
6	Vojvodina	37	14	11	12	57	49	+8	53						0–0		0–3	3–1
7	TSC	37	15	5	17	59	58	+1	50		1–2		1–2	3–2				
8	Mladost Lučani	37	12	11	14	38	48	−10	47			0–4	1–1				2–0	

Source: SuperLiga (in Serbian)
Rules for classification: 1) Points; 2) Points in regular season; 3) Head-to-head points in regular season; 4) Head-to-head goal difference in regular season; 5) Head-to-head goals scored in regular season; 6) Head-to-head away goals scored in regular season (if two teams tied); 7) Goal difference; 8) Goals scored; 9) Fair play ranking; 10) Drawing of lots.
Notes:

Pos	Team	Pld	W	D	L	GF	GA	GD	Pts	Qualification or relegation	CUK	ZEL	IMT	SPA	RNI	NAP	TEK	JED
1	Čukarički	37	12	13	12	47	49	−2	49			2–2	1–1	0–0	2–2			
2	Železničar	37	13	10	14	49	43	+6	49					3–0	1–2	1–1		3–1
3	IMT	37	13	9	15	49	55	−6	48			0–1		2–4		2–1	3–1	
4	Spartak Subotica	37	11	11	15	35	51	−16	44						1–0	2–1	2–4	
5	Radnički Niš	37	11	10	16	50	67	−17	43	Qualification for the play-off			1–1				1–0	3–1
6	Napredak Kruševac	37	11	9	17	35	48	−13	42	Qualification for the play-off	0–1				2–1		0–1	1–0
7	Tekstilac Odžaci (R)	37	11	4	22	33	65	−32	31 (Note: Tekstilac Odžaci had 6 points deducted for a irregular match against IMT.)	Relegation to Serbian First League	0–3	0–1						2–3
8	Jedinstvo Ub (R)	37	7	4	26	32	73	−41	25	Relegation to Serbian First League	4–1		0–3	1–0				

Source: SuperLiga (in Serbian)
Rules for classification: 1) Points; 2) Points in regular season; 3) Head-to-head points in regular season; 4) Head-to-head goal difference in regular season; 5) Head-to-head goals scored in regular season; 6) Head-to-head away goals scored in regular season (if two teams tied); 7) Goal difference; 8) Goals scored; 9) Fair play ranking; 10) Drawing of lots.
(R) Relegated

==== Results summary ====
Overall								Home						Away					
Pld	W	D	L	GF	GA	GD	Pts	W	D	L	GF	GA	GD	W	D	L	GF	GA	GD
0	0	0	0	0	0	0	0	0	0	0	0	0	0	0	0	0	0	0	0

Source: soccerway

==== Results by round ====
Round	1
Ground	
Result	
Position	

A = Away; H = Home; W = Win; D = Draw; L = Loss

==== Matches ====
The match schedule was released on 10 June 2024.

20 July 2024 1	Mladost Lučani	1-2	OFK Beograd	Lučani
20:00 CEST	Cvetinović (yellow card) 5' (yellow-red card) 84' (goal) 59'; Miloš Divac (yellow card) 49'; Tumbasević (yellow card) 51'	Report	Kahvić 86' (pen.) 90+3' (yellow card) 90+4'	Stadium: Youth Stadium; Attendance: 1,500; Referee: (Serbia) Nikola Radaković

27 July 2024 2	Crvena zvezda	2-2	Mladost Lučani	Belgrade
20:00 CEST	Hwang In-beom (yellow card) 37'; Bruno Duarte 85'; Ndiaye 90+1'	Report	N'Diaye 19'; Tumbasević (yellow card) 33'; Ćirković 37' (yellow card) 47'; Uroš Ljubomirac (red card) 68'; Andrić (yellow card) 68'; Stamenković (yellow card) 90+6'	Stadium: Red Star Stadium; Attendance: 11,447; Referee: (Serbia) Milan Ilić

3 August 2024 3	Mladost Lučani	2-1	Jedinstvo Ub	Lučani
20:00 CEST	Pejović 52'; Ognjen Krsmanović 71'; Tumbasević (yellow card) 77'; Sava Pribaković (red card) 89'	Report	Ceesay (yellow card) 30'; Stefan Golubović 39'; Luka Radivojević (yellow card) 30'	Stadium: Youth Stadium; Attendance: 800; Referee: (Serbia) Ivan Stamenković

10 August 2024 4	Mladost Lučani	1-2	Tekstilac Odžaci	Lučani
20:00 CEST	Miloš Divac (yellow card) 69'; Bojić 84'; Joksimović (yellow card) 90+2'	Report	Ivan Davidović 4' 55'; Miloš Zekić (yellow card) 45+1'; Prince Lucky Ukachukwu (yellow card) 72'; Dejan Đurić (yellow card) 77'	Stadium: Youth Stadium; Attendance: 250; Referee: (Serbia) Pavle Tomić

17 August 2024 5	Novi Pazar	0-1	Mladost Lučani	Novi Pazar
17:30 CEST	Mesarović (yellow card) 33'; Adeshina (yellow card) 88'	Report	Ognjen Krsmanović 29'; Andrić (yellow card) 90+3'	Stadium: Novi Pazar City Stadium; Referee: (Serbia) David Matic

23 August 2024 6	Mladost Lučani	3-1	Čukarički	Lučani
21:00 CEST	Sissoko 25' (o.g.); Uroš Ljubomirac 35' 90+1' (yellow card) 38'; Pejović (yellow card) 49'; Filip Žunić (yellow card) 72'	Report	Sissoko 75'	Stadium: Youth Stadium; Attendance: 1,800; Referee: (Serbia) Milan Ilić

1 September 2024 7	TSC	1-2	Mladost Lučani	Bačka Topola
19:00 CEST	Đakovac 7' (pen.); Ilić (yellow card) 29'	Report	Pejović 29' (pen.) (yellow card) 86'; Joksimović (yellow card) 35'; Jovan Ćirić 41' (yellow card) 45+2'; Cvetinović (red card) 55'	Stadium: TSC Arena; Attendance: 1,100; Referee: (Serbia) Pedrag Janjuš

14 September 2024 8	Mladost Lučani	2-1	Radnički 1923	Lučani
21:00 CEST	Ognjen Krsmanović (yellow card) 36'; Pejović 48' (pen.) 55' (pen.); Tumbasević (yellow card) 77'; Leković (yellow card) 90+4'	Report	Evandro 11' (yellow card) 39'; Dadić (yellow card) 61'	Stadium: Youth Stadium; Attendance: 500; Referee: (Serbia) Lazar Lukić

21 September 2024 9	Napredak	1-2	Mladost Lučani	Kruševac
21:00 CEST	Ostojić (yellow card) 29'; Ćirković (yellow card) 35'; Stoiljković 39'	Report	Pejović 7' (pen.); Andrić 24'	Stadium: Mladost Stadium; Attendance: 1,500; Referee: (Serbia) Jovan Šegrt

29 September 2024 10	Mladost Lučani	1-3	Partizan	Lučani
18:00 CEST	Ognjen Krsmanović (yellow card) 38'; Pejović 45+2' (pen.) (yellow card) 54'; Filip Žunić (yellow card) 80'	Report	Ilić 12'; Jovanović 26'; Kovač 57'; Stjepanović (yellow card) 90+5'	Stadium: Youth Stadium; Attendance: 1,340; Referee: (Serbia) Nenad Minaković

5 October 2024 11	Železničar Pančevo	1-2	Mladost Lučani	Pančevo
17:00 CEST	Knežević (yellow card) 22'; Romanić 39'; Abdul Yusif (yellow card) 71'	Report	Pejović 2' (pen.) (yellow card) 87'; Filip Žunić (yellow card) 45+1'; Ćirković (yellow card) 52'; Varjačić 58'	Stadium: SRC Mladost Pančevo; Attendance: 300; Referee: (Serbia) Pavle Tomić

20 October 2024 12	Mladost Lučani	1-0	FK IMT	Lučani
18:00 CEST	Varjačić 33' (pen.); Filip Žunić (yellow card) 43'; Leković (yellow card) 56'; Nikola Jojić (yellow card) 85'	Report	Batisse (yellow card) 54'; Court (yellow card) 90'	Stadium: SRC MR Radoš Milovanović; Attendance: 200; Referee: (Serbia) David Matić

27 October 2024 13	Radnički Niš	1-1	Mladost Lučani	Niš
21:00 CEST	Tanko 24'; Nišić (yellow card) 79'	Report	Uroš Ljubomirac (yellow card) 33'; Nikola Jojić 66'; Miloš Divac (yellow card) 90'; Stamenković (yellow card) 90+4'	Stadium: Čair Stadium; Attendance: 500; Referee: (Serbia) Miroslav Milenković
