= 2026–27 FK Novi Pazar season =

FK Novi Pazar
2026–27 season
- Manager: Strahinja Pandurović (until 13 October); Nenad Lalatović (from 15 October)
- Stadium: Novi Pazar City Stadium
- Serbian SuperLiga Regular season: 8th
- Top goalscorer: Kaheim Dixon (2)

The 2026–27 season is the 99th season in the history of FK Novi Pazar and the club's sixth consecutive season in the Serbian SuperLiga.

== Transfers ==
=== In ===
Pos.	Player	Transferred from	Fee	Date	Source
DF	(Montenegro) Bojan Adžić	(Serbia) Radnički 1923	Free	1 July 2026	
FW	(Brazil) Jonny	(Malta) Hamrun Spartans	Free	1 July 2026	
DF	(Serbia) Aleksandar Miljković	(Armenia) Pyunik	Free	1 July 2026	
FW	(Serbia) Fejsal Mulić	(Uzbekistan) Sogdiyona Jizzakh	Free	1 July 2026	
MF	(Serbia) Nikola Stanković	(Serbia) Sloven Ruma	Free	1 July 2026	
MF	(Serbia) Mihajlo Petrović	(Serbia) OFK Beograd	Undisclosed	1 July 2026	
MF	(Serbia) Nikola Skrobonja	(Serbia) Napredak Kruševac	Free	3 July 2026	
DF	(Montenegro) Stefan Melentijević	(Slovenia) Primorje	Free	4 July 2026	
MF	(Senegal) Papa Amady Gadio	(Russia) Akhmat Grozny	Loan	23 July 2026	
FW	(Jamaica) Kaheim Dixon	(England) Charlton Athletic	Undisclosed	27 July 2026	
DF	(Croatia) Tomislav Dadić	(Russia) Rotor Volgograd	Free	30 July 2026	
MF	(Serbia) Adem Ljajić	(Bosnia and Herzegovina) Sarajevo	Free	31 August 2026	
FW	(Nigeria) Johnson Agwom Dauda	(Czech Republic) Slovan Liberec	Loan	2 September 2026	
FW	(Slovenia) Haris Kadrić	(Lithuania) Kauno Žalgiris	Loan	7 September 2026	

=== Out ===
Pos.	Player	Transferred to	Fee	Date	Source
MF	(Serbia) Zoran Alilović	(Serbia) Partizan	Loan return	30 June 2026	
DF	(North Macedonia) Jovan Manev	(Croatia) Rijeka	Loan return	30 June 2026	
MF	(Nigeria) Samson Nwulu	(Serbia) Partizan	Loan return	30 June 2026	
MF	(Serbia) Mihajlo Petković	(Serbia) Partizan	Loan return	30 June 2026	
GK	(Serbia) Željko Samčović	(Serbia) Mladost Lučani	Loan return	30 June 2026	
MF	(Serbia) Semir Alić	(Serbia) Radnički 1923	Free	1 July 2026	
DF	(Serbia) Filip Bačkulja	(Slovenia) Koper	Loan	1 July 2026	
MF	(Serbia) Luka Bijelović	(Serbia) Grafičar Beograd	Free	1 July 2026	
DF	(Serbia) Nemanja Miletić	(Serbia) Radnički 1923	Free	1 July 2026	
FW	(Italy) Bob Omoregbe	(Portugal) Torreense	Free	1 July 2026	
DF	(Serbia) Ensar Brunčević	(Uzbekistan) FC Kattaqorgon	Free	14 July 2026	
MF	(Montenegro) Driton Camaj	(Turkey) Muğlaspor	Free	17 July 2026	
MF	(Somalia) Abdulsamed Abdullahi	(Montenegro) Arsenal Tivat	Free	5 August 2026	
FW	(Serbia) Anes Rušević	(Saudi Arabia) Al-Shoulla	Free		

== Friendlies ==
28 June 2026	Mladost Lučani	3–1	Novi Pazar
19:00

1 July 2026	Mačva Šabac	2–1	Novi Pazar
18:30

4 July 2026	Novi Pazar	1–1	(Russia) Akhmat Grozny
11:00

9 July 2026	Novi Pazar	0–1	Radnik Surdulica
18:30

== Overall record ==
Competition	First match	Last match	Starting round	Record							
Competition	First match	Last match	Starting round	Pld	W	D	L	GF	GA	GD	Win %
Serbian SuperLiga Regular season	18 July 2026		Matchday 1	11	3	4	4	10	12	−2	27.27
Serbian Cup				0	0	0	0	0	0	+0	—
Total				11	3	4	4	10	12	−2	27.27

Last updated: 11 October 2026
Source: Competitions

== Serbian SuperLiga ==
=== Regular season ===
Overall								Home						Away					
Pld	W	D	L	GF	GA	GD	Pts	W	D	L	GF	GA	GD	W	D	L	GF	GA	GD
11	3	4	4	10	12	−2	13	3	2	1	9	7	+2	0	2	3	1	5	−4

Last updated: 11 October 2026.

Round	1	2	3	4	5	6	7	8	9	10	11	12
Ground	H	A	H	A	H	A	H	H	A	H	A	H
Result	W	D	L	L	W	L	D	W	D	D	L	
Position												

Updated to match(es) played on 11 October 2026. Source:
A = Away; H = Home; W = Win; D = Draw; L = Loss

18 July 2026 1	Novi Pazar	1–0	Radnički 1923	Novi Pazar
20:00				Stadium: Novi Pazar City Stadium

26 July 2026 2	Mladost Lučani	0–0	Novi Pazar
20:30

1 August 2026 3	Novi Pazar	1–4	OFK Beograd	Novi Pazar
20:00				Stadium: Novi Pazar City Stadium

8 August 2026 4	Red Star Belgrade	2–0	Novi Pazar
20:00

17 August 2026 5	Novi Pazar	2–0	Vojvodina	Novi Pazar
20:00				Stadium: Novi Pazar City Stadium

23 August 2026 6	Radnik Surdulica	1–0	Novi Pazar
19:00

29 August 2026 7	Novi Pazar	1–1	Mačva Šabac	Novi Pazar
21:00				Stadium: Novi Pazar City Stadium

4 September 2026 8	Novi Pazar	2–0	Železničar Pančevo	Novi Pazar
19:00				Stadium: Novi Pazar City Stadium

12 September 2026 9	Čukarički	1–1	Novi Pazar
18:30

19 September 2026 10	Novi Pazar	2–2	Zemun	Novi Pazar
17:00				Stadium: Novi Pazar City Stadium

11 October 2026 11	Partizan	1–0	Novi Pazar	Belgrade
17:00	Jeh 81'; Seck (yellow card) 89'		Miljković (yellow card) 64'	Stadium: Partizan Stadium; Referee: Miloš Milanović

18 October 2026 12	Novi Pazar	v	IMT	Novi Pazar
14:00				Stadium: Novi Pazar City Stadium

== Serbian Cup ==
v
