= 2023–24 Serbian Cup =

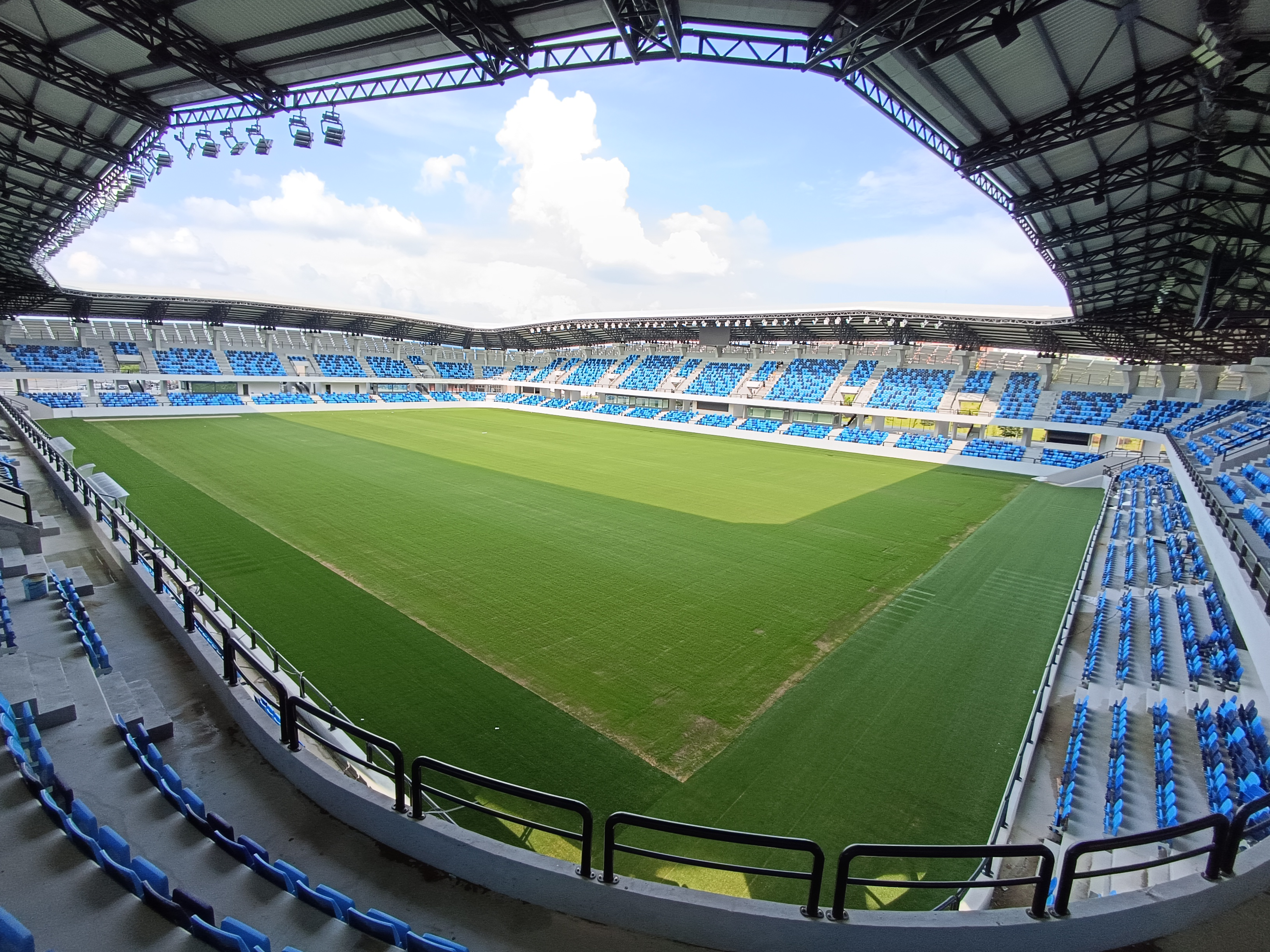
- Lagator Stadium hosted the final

Tournament details
- Country: Serbia
- Teams: 37

Final positions
- Champions: Red Star
- Runners-up: Vojvodina
- Semifinalists: Radnički 1923; Partizan

Tournament statistics
- Matches played: 36
- Goals scored: 103 (2.86 per match)
- Top goal scorer(s): Lazar Mićić, Junior Flemmings, Cherif Ndiaye, Peter Olayinka (3 goals each)

The 2023–24 Serbian Cup season is the eighteenth season of the Serbian national football cup competition. It started on 13 September 2023, and ended on 23 May 2024.

== Calendar ==
| Round | Date(s) | Number of fixtures | Clubs | New entries this round |
|---|---|---|---|---|
| Preliminary round | 13 September 2023 | 5 | 37 → 32 | 10 |
| Round of 32 | 18 October 2023 – 1 November 2023 | 16 | 32 → 16 | 27 |
| Round of 16 | 6 December 2023 | 8 | 16 → 8 | none |
| Quarter-finals | 10 April 2024 | 4 | 8 → 4 | none |
| Semi-finals | 24 April 2024 | 2 | 4 → 2 | none |
| Final | 23 May 2024 | 1 | 2 → 1 | none |

== Preliminary round ==
A preliminary round was held in order to reduce the number of teams competing in the first round to 32. It consisted of 5 single-legged ties, with a penalty shoot-out as the decider if the score was tied after 90 minutes.

| 13 September 2023 | Meševo (III) | 0–2 | Smederevo 1924 (II) | Meševo |
| 16:00 | | Report | Jovanović 13'; Ristić 34' (pen.) | Stadium: Stadion FK Meševo; Attendance: 150; Referee: Dušan Belić |

| 13 September 2023 | Zlatibor (III) | 0–1 | Metalac (II) | Čajetina |
| 16:00 | | Report | Marković 22' | Stadium: Stadion Švajcarija; Attendance: 200; Referee: Srdjan Dimitrijevic |

| 13 September 2023 | Trayal (III) | 3–0 | Gracko (IV) | Kruševac |
| 16:00 | Spasojević 23'; Radivojević 26'; Jović 73' | Report | | Stadium: Mladost Stadium; Attendance: 300; Referee: Darko Jeknić |

| 13 September 2023 | BASK TEK (III) | 2–0 | Loznica (III) | Belgrade |
| 16:00 | Vučinić 36', 74' | Report | | Stadium: Careva ćuprija Attendance: 30; Referee: Dragutin Meničanin |

| 13 September 2023 | Dinamo 1945 (III) | 2–0 | Rad (III) | Pančevo |
| 16:00 | Đošić 34' (pen.); Jonaš 54' | Report | | Stadium: Stadion FK Dinamo; Attendance: 200; Referee: Pavle Grujić |

== Round of 32 ==
Draw for the first round took place on 11 October 2023. Matches were played on 1 November 2023. It consisted of 16 single-legged ties, with a penalty shoot-out as the decider if the score was tied after 90 minutes.

| 18 October 2023 | Smederevo 1924 (II) | 1–1 (4–3 p) | TSC | Smederevo |
| 14:00 | Cvetinović 70' (o.g.) | Report | Vlalukin 76' | Stadium: Smederevo Stadium; Attendance: 1,500; Referee: Milan Stefanović |

| 18 October 2023 | Trayal (III) | 0–6 | Red Star | Kruševac |
| 15:00 | | Report | Spasojević 8' (o.g.); Ndiaye 51'; Šljivić 76', 90'; Knežević 77'; Mijatović 89' | Stadium: Mladost Stadium; Attendance: 1,800; Referee: Nikola Petrović |

| 1 November 2023 | Dinamo 1945 (III) | 0–5 | Voždovac | Pančevo |
| 13:00 | | Report | Vaštšuk 28'; Mitrović 33'; Teodorović 35'; Flemmings 45'; Vujanović 84' | Stadium: Stadion FK Dinamo; Attendance: 300; Referee: Nikola Bikić |

| 1 November 2023 | BASK TEK (III) | 2–4 | Radnički 1923 | Belgrade |
| 13:00 | Šarić 31' (pen.); Đokić 77' | Report | Vidović 45'; Aleksić 56'; Đurić 75'; Chinedu 87' | Stadium: Careva ćuprija Attendance: 300; Referee: Marko Gnjatović |

| 1 November 2023 | Jedinstvo (II) | 0–1 | Partizan | Ub |
| 13:00 | | Report | Nikolić 54' | Stadium: Stadion Dragan Džajić; Attendance: 3,700; Referee: Danilo Nikolić |

| 1 November 2023 | Radnički Sremska Mitrovica (II) | 2–0 | Radnik | Sremska Mitrovica |
| 13:00 | Mićić 12', 29' | Report | | Stadium: Gradski stadion Sremska Mitrovica; Attendance: 250; Referee: Lazar Lukić |

| 1 November 2023 | RFK Grafičar (II) | 2–0 | Spartak | Belgrade |
| 13:00 | Stojanović 48'; Đukić 57' | Report | | Stadium: Stadion Rajko Mitić - Jug; Attendance: 100; Referee: Mladen Jakovljević |

| 1 November 2023 | Inđija (II) | 4–1 | Kolubara (II) | Inđija |
| 13:00 | Grbović 21'; Gajilović 48'; Mitrović 59'; Derviši 65' | Report | Galvão 43' | Stadium: Inđija Stadium; Attendance: 200; Referee: Nikola Đorđević |

| 1 November 2023 | OFK Vršac (II) | 3–1 | Mladost Lučani | Vršac |
| 13:00 | Grek 26'; Glavinić 32'; Milivojević 66' | Report | Mirić 54' | Stadium: Gradski stadion Vršac; Attendance: 300; Referee: Miroslav Milenković |

| 1 November 2023 | Radnički Beograd (II) | 0–0 (3–4 p) | Čukarički | Belgrade |
| 13:00 | | Report | | Stadium: Stadion FK Radnički; Attendance: 250; Referee: Nikola Radaković |

| 1 November 2023 | Sloboda (II) | 0–0 (4–5 p) | Napredak | Užice |
| 13:00 | | Report | | Stadium: Radomir Antić Stadium; Attendance: 900; Referee: Pavle Ilić |

| 1 November 2023 | IMT | 1–1 (2–4 p) | Javor | Belgrade |
| 15:00 | Luković 85' (pen.) | Report | Gigić 66' | Stadium: Voždovac Stadium; Attendance: 100; Referee: Milan Ilić |

| 1 November 2023 | Železničar Pančevo | 0–1 | Novi Pazar | Pančevo |
| 17:00 | | Report | Obradović 77' | Stadium: SC Mladost; Attendance: 1,000; Referee: Andrija Stojanović |

| 1 November 2023 | Mačva (II) | 0–1 | Mladost GAT (II) | Šabac |
| 17:00 | | Report | Živković 18' | Stadium: Stadion FK Mačva Šabac; Attendance: 650; Referee: Stefan Jeknić |

| 1 November 2023 | Metalac (II) | 0–3 | Radnički Niš | Gornji Milanovac |
| 18:00 | | Report | Cvetković 21'; Nimaga 45'; Ivelja 81' | Stadium: Stadion Metalac; Attendance: 250; Referee: Predrag Janjuš |

| 1 November 2023 | Novi Sad 1921 (II) | 0–2 | Vojvodina | Novi Sad |
| 19:00 | | Report | Zukić 78'; Vukanović 83' | Stadium: Karađorđe Stadium; Attendance: 7,000; Referee: David Matić |

== Round of 16 ==
Draw for the second round took place on 7 November 2023. Seeding of the teams was determined based on the league performances from previous season. Matches were played on 6 December 2023. It consisted of 8 single-legged ties, with a penalty shoot-out as the decider if the score was tied after 90 minutes.

| 5 December 2023 | Inđija (II) | 2–3 | Novi Pazar | Inđija |
| 13:00 | Kojić 28'; Radosavljević 29' | Report | Bogdanovski 6'; Ergelaš 17', 21' (pen.) | Stadium: Inđija Stadium; Attendance: 200; Referee: Pavle Tomić |

| 6 December 2023 | OFK Vršac (II) | 1–0 | Napredak | Vršac |
| 13:00 | Milivojević 66' | Report | | Stadium: Gradski stadion Vršac; Attendance: 300; Referee: Milan Stefanović |

| 6 December 2023 | Radnički 1923 | 5–0 | Smederevo 1924 (II) | Kragujevac |
| 13:00 | Vidakov 19'; Aleksić 46'; Milošević 54'; Tomić 81' (pen.); Adžić 84' | Report | | Stadium: Čika Dača Stadium; Attendance: 250; Referee: Predrag Janjuš |

| 6 December 2023 | Čukarički | 4–1 | Javor | Belgrade |
| 15:30 | Cvetković 13'; Kovač 29'; Sissoko 37'; Ivanović 45' | Report | Loué 81' | Stadium: Čukarički Stadium; Attendance: 50; Referee: Stefan Jeknić |

| 6 December 2023 | Voždovac | 6–3 | Radnički Sremska Mitrovica (II) | Belgrade |
| 15:30 | Nešković 4'; Vujanović 16'; Flemmings 22', 26'; Skrobonja 48'; Jočić 55' | Report | Mićić 54'; Tripković 63'; Đukanović 81' | Stadium: Voždovac Stadium; Attendance: 50; Referee: Nikola Đorđević |

| 6 December 2023 | Mladost GAT (II) | 0–3 | Vojvodina | Novi Sad |
| 18:00 | | Report | Miletić 40'; Zukić 44'; Vukić 83' | Stadium: Karađorđe Stadium; Attendance: 1,500; Referee: Jovan Šegrt |

| 6 December 2023 | Red Star | 5–0 | Radnički Niš | Belgrade |
| 18:00 | Knežević 11'; Katai 17'; Ndiaye 19'; Lučić 26'; Krasso 38' (pen.) | Report | | Stadium: Rajko Mitić Stadium; Attendance: 1,200; Referee: Nikola Radaković |

| 7 December 2023 | Partizan | 1–1 (5–4 p) | RFK Grafičar (II) | Belgrade |
| 16:00 | Jovanović 79' | Report | Ajdar 64' | Stadium: Partizan Stadium; Attendance: 500; Referee: Andrija Stojanović |
| | Penalties |
| | Natcho (penalty scored); Belić (penalty scored); Kalulu (penalty scored); Zahid (penalty scored); Saldanha (penalty scored) | | Petrović (penalty scored); Jovanović (penalty scored); Vukičević (penalty scored); Đukić (penalty scored) |

== Quarter-finals ==
Draw for the quarter-finals took place on 25 December 2023. Matches were played on 10 and 11 April 2024. It will consist of 4 single-legged ties, with a penalty shoot-out as the decider if the score was tied after 90 minutes.

| 10 April 2024 | Čukarički | 1–1 (3–4 p) | Vojvodina | Belgrade |
| 17:00 | Ivanović 67' | Report | Savićević 50' | Stadium: Čukarički Stadium; Attendance: 540; Referee: Pavle Ilić |
| | Penalties |
| | Milojević (penalty missed); Ivanović (penalty scored); Vinicius Mello (penalty scored); Ergelaš (penalty scored); Jovanović (penalty missed) | | (penalty scored) Zukić; (penalty scored) Petrović; (penalty scored) Lazarević; (penalty scored) Savićević |

| 10 April 2024 | Red Star | 3–0 | OFK Vršac (II) | Belgrade |
| 19:00 | Katai 6'; Ndiaye 65'; Bukari 82' | Report | | Stadium: Rajko Mitić Stadium; Attendance: 5,339; Referee: Stefan Jenkić |

| 10 April 2024 | Partizan | 1–1 (4–3 p) | Voždovac | Belgrade |
| 15:00 | Baždar 45+2' | Report | Pirgić 89' | Stadium: Partizan Stadium; Attendance: 2,000; Referee: Ivan Stamenković |
| | Penalties |
| | Janković (penalty scored); Nikolić (penalty scored); Antić (penalty scored); Zahid (penalty scored) | | Nešković (penalty missed); Đurđević (penalty scored); Petrović (penalty scored); Flemmings (penalty scored); Pirgić (penalty missed) |

| 11 April 2024 | Radnički 1923 | 3–1 | Novi Pazar | Kragujevac |
| 16:00 | Bevis 31'; Vidosavljević 35' (pen.); Ortiz 90+8' | Report | Srećković 73' | Stadium: Čika Dača Stadium; Attendance: 8,500; Referee: Dejan Trifković |

== Semi-finals ==
Draw for the semi-finals took place on 16 April 2023. Matches will be played on 24 April 2024. It will consist of 2 single-legged ties, with a penalty shoot-out as the decider if the score was tied after 90 minutes.

| 24 April 2024 | Radnički 1923 | 0–1 | Vojvodina | Kragujevac |
| 16:00 | | Report | Korać 90+1' | Stadium: Čika Dača Stadium; Attendance: 9,726; Referee: Momčilo Marković |

| 24 April 2024 | Red Star | 2–0 | Partizan | Belgrade |
| 19:00 | Filipović 27' (o.g.), Olayinka 29' | Report | | Stadium: Red Star Stadium; Attendance: 25,000; Referee: Miloš Milanović |

== Final ==
The final was played on 21 May 2024, contested by Vojvodina and Red Star Belgrade. The match was held at new Lagator Stadium in Loznica.

21 May 2024
20:15 CEST (UTC+2)

| Red Star | 2–1 | Vojvodina |
|---|---|---|
| Ivanić 37'; Spajić 66' | Report | Vukanović 90+9' |

Lagator Stadium, Loznica
Attendance: 7,900
Referee: Milan Ilić

| GK | 18 | (Israel) Omri Glazer |
| RB | 33 | (Serbia) Srđan Mijailović |
| CB | 15 | (Austria) Aleksandar Dragović |
| CB | 5 | (Serbia) Uroš Spajić |
| LB | 23 | (Serbia) Milan Rodić |
| RM | 6 | (New Zealand) Marko Stamenić (yellow card) 20' | (substituted off) 74' |
| CM | 66 | (South Korea) Hwang In-beom | (substituted off) 90+5' |
| LM | 4 | (Montenegro) Mirko Ivanić | (substituted off) 90+5' |
| RF | 9 | (Senegal) Cherif Ndiaye (yellow card) 41' | (substituted off) 90+6' |
| CF | 30 | (Ghana) Osman Bukari | (substituted off) 75' |
| LF | 14 | (Nigeria) Peter Olayinka |
Substitutes:
| GK | 1 | (Serbia) Zoran Popović |
| DF | 19 | (Serbia) Nemanja Milunović |
| DF | 24 | (Burkina Faso) Nasser Djiga |
| DF | 70 | (Serbia) Ognjen Mimović | (substituted on) 90+5' |
| DF | 76 | (Serbia) Lazar Nikolić |
| MF | 7 | (Serbia) Jovan Šljivić | (substituted on) 90+5' |
| MF | 8 | (Gabon) Guélor Kanga | (substituted on) 75' |
| MF | 10 | (Serbia) Aleksandar Katai | (substituted on) 74' |
| MF | 41 | (Serbia) Nikola Knežević | (substituted on) 90+6' |
| FW | 17 | (Ivory Coast) Jean-Philippe Krasso |
| FW | 31 | (Serbia) Uroš Sremčević |
Manager:
(Serbia) Vladan Milojević

| GK | 25 | (Montenegro) Lazar Carević |
| RB | 50 | (Serbia) Milan Lazarević | (substituted off) 77' |
| CB | 6 | (Serbia) Seid Korać (yellow card) 63' |
| CB | 5 | (Serbia) Đorđe Crnomarković (yellow card) 30' |
| LB | 8 | (Serbia) Stefan Đorđević |
| RM | 18 | (Serbia) Njegoš Petrović |
| CM | 10 | (Serbia) Dejan Zukić | (substituted off) 88' |
| CM | 26 | (Montenegro) Vukan Savićević (yellow card) 89' | (substituted off) 65' |
| LM | 14 | (Ivory Coast) Caleb Zady Sery |
| CF | 92 | (Serbia) Aleksa Vukanović (yellow card) 87' |
| CF | 11 | (Serbia) Mihailo Ivanović |
Substitutes:
| GK | 36 | (Serbia) Andrej Borak |
| DF | 2 | (Serbia) Marko Bjeković |
| DF | 4 | (Georgia (country)) Guram Giorbelidze |
| DF | 15 | (Serbia) Igor Jeličić |
| MF | 16 | (Montenegro) Asmir Kajević |
| MF | 20 | (Serbia) Uroš Nikolić | (substituted on) 88' |
| MF | 23 | (Brazil) Matheus Índio |
| FW | 28 | (Jamaica) Norman Campbell | (substituted on) 77' |
| MF | 49 | (Montenegro) Andrija Radulović | (substituted on) 65' |
| FW | 17 | (Serbia) Lazar Jovanović |
| FW | 99 | (Montenegro) Ivan Vukčević |
Manager:
(Montenegro) Božidar Bandović

== Top scorers ==
As of matches played on 24 April 2024.

| Rank | Player | Club | Goals |
|---|---|---|---|
| 1 | (Serbia) Lazar Mićić | Radnički Sremska Mitrovica | 3 |
| 1 | (Nigeria) Peter Olayinka | Red Star Belgrade | 3 |
| 1 | (Senegal) Cherif Ndiaye | Red Star Belgrade | 3 |
| 1 | (Jamaica) Junior Flemmings | Voždovac | 3 |
| 2 | (Serbia) Dejan Zukić | Vojvodina | 2 |
| 2 | (Serbia) Jovan Šljivić | Red Star Belgrade | 2 |
| 2 | (Serbia) Petar Vučinić | BASK TEK | 2 |
| 2 | (Serbia) Mitar Ergelaš | Novi Pazar | 2 |
| 2 | (Serbia) Aleksandar Katai | Red Star Belgrade | 2 |
| 2 | (Serbia) Miloš Milivojević | OFK Vršac | 2 |
| 2 | (Serbia) Milan Aleksić | Radnički 1923 | 2 |
| 2 | (Montenegro) Nikša Vujanović | Voždovac | 2 |
| 2 | (Serbia) Nikola Knežević | Red Star Belgrade | 2 |
| 2 | (Serbia) Đorđe Ivanović | Čukarički | 2 |
