= Milan Joksimović =

Serbian footballer

Personal information
- Date of birth: 9 February 1990 (age 36)
- Place of birth: Užice, SFR Yugoslavia
- Height: 1.83 m (6 ft 0 in)
- Position: Left-back

Team information
- Current team: Mladost Lučani
- Number: 12

Youth career
- 2007–2008: Sloboda Užice

Senior career*
Years	Team	Apps	(Gls)
2007–2008	Sloboda Užice	20	(2)
2009–2011	Inđija	41	(0)
2011–2012	Spartak Subotica	24	(0)
2012–2013	Jedinstvo Užice	25	(1)
2013–2014	Metalac Gornji Milanovac	15	(0)
2014–2016	Jedinstvo Užice	44	(1)
2016–2017	Sloboda Užice	29	(0)
2017	Gorodeya	12	(0)
2018	KA	16	(0)
2019–2020	Gorodeya	45	(1)
2020–2021	Liepāja	14	(0)
2021–2023	Novi Pazar	59	(2)
2023–	Mladost Lučani	70	(0)
- * Club domestic league appearances and goals as of 13 June 2026

Milan Joksimović (Serbian Cyrillic: Милан Јоксимовић; born 9 February 1990) is a Serbian football defender who plays for Mladost Lučani.

== Club career ==
In February 2018, he joined KA in Iceland.
