= Aleksandar Varjačić =

Serbian footballer

Personal information
- Full name: Aleksandar Varjačić
- Date of birth: 23 May 1991 (age 35)
- Place of birth: Kragujevac, SFR Yugoslavia
- Height: 1.87 m (6 ft 2 in)
- Positions: Right-back; midfielder

Team information
- Current team: Mladost Lučani
- Number: 17

Senior career*
Years	Team	Apps	(Gls)
2009–2013	Radnički Kragujevac	42	(5)
2011	→ Pobeda Beloševac (loan)	14	(2)
2013	Radnik Surdulica	11	(0)
2014	Pobeda Beloševac	13	(3)
2014–2015	Jagodina	5	(0)
2014	→ Tabane Trgovački (loan)	10	(2)
2015	Karađorđe Topola	5	(0)
2016	Šapine		
2016–2022	Radnički Kragujevac	164	(17)
2023–	Mladost Lučani	99	(10)
- * Club domestic league appearances and goals as of 12 June 2026

Aleksandar Varjačić (Serbian Cyrillic: Александар Варјачић; born 23 May 1991) is a Serbian professional footballer who plays as a defender for FK Mladost Lučani.

== Honours ==
Radnički Kragujevac

- Serbian League West (2): 2009–10, 2016–17

Šapine

- Dunav Zone League: 2015–16

=== Individual ===
- Serbian SuperLiga Team of the Season: 2023–24
