= Nemanja Spasojević =

Serbian association football player

Personal information
- Date of birth: 8 December 1996 (age 29)
- Place of birth: Šabac, FR Yugoslavia
- Height: 1.86 m (6 ft 1 in)
- Position: Defender

Youth career
- –2015: Radnički Kragujevac

Senior career*
| Years | Team | Apps | (Gls) |
| 2015–2016 | Radnički Kragujevac | 9 | (0) |
| 2016–2017 | Rimavská Sobota | 15 | (0) |
| 2017–2018 | Frýdek-Místek | 15 | (0) |
| 2018–2019 | Spartak Trnava B | | |
| 2018–2019 | → Rimavská Sobota (loan) | | |
| 2019–2020 | Radnički Pirot | 18 | (0) |
| 2020–2021 | Radnički Sremska Mitrovica | 28 | (0) |
| 2021 | Xinjiang Tianshan Leopard | 9 | (0) |
| 2022 | Radnički Sremska Mitrovica | 25 | (0) |
| 2022 | FK Cer Petkovica | | |
| 2022–2023 | Radnički Sremska Mitrovica | | |
| 2023–2024 | Trayal Kruševac | | |
| 2024–2025 | Radnički Sremska Mitrovica | 21 | (0) |
- * Club domestic league appearances and goals as of 25 June 2025

Nemanja Spasojević (born 8 December 1996) is a Serbian footballer who most recently played as a defender for Radnički Sremska Mitrovica.

== Career statistics ==
=== Club ===
As of 17 August 2021.

| Club | Season | League | | | Cup | | Other | | Total | |
| Club | Season | Division | Apps | Goals | Apps | Goals | Apps | Goals | Apps | Goals |
|---|---|---|---|---|---|---|---|---|---|---|
| Radnički Kragujevac | 2015–16 | Prva liga | 9 | 0 | 0 | 0 | 0 | 0 | 9 | 0 |
| Rimavská Sobota | 2016–17 | 2. Liga | 15 | 0 | 0 | 0 | 0 | 0 | 15 | 0 |
| Frýdek-Místek | 2016–17 | Fortuna národní liga | 11 | 0 | 0 | 0 | 0 | 0 | 11 | 0 |
| Frýdek-Místek | 2017–18 | Fortuna národní liga | 4 | 0 | 1 (Note: Appearances in the Czech Cup) | 0 | 0 | 0 | 5 | 0 |
| Frýdek-Místek | Total | | 15 | 0 | 1 | 0 | 0 | 0 | 16 | 0 |
| Radnički Pirot | 2019–20 | Prva liga | 18 | 0 | 0 | 0 | 0 | 0 | 18 | 0 |
| Radnički Sremska Mitrovica | 2020–21 | Prva liga | 28 | 0 | 0 | 0 | 0 | 0 | 28 | 0 |
| Xinjiang Tianshan Leopard | 2021 | China League One | 0 | 0 | 0 | 0 | 0 | 0 | 0 | 0 |
| Career total | | | 85 | 0 | 1 | 0 | 0 | 0 | 86 | 0 |
