= Rafael Floro =

Portuguese footballer (born 1994)

Personal information
- Full name: Rafael da Silva Floro
- Date of birth: 19 January 1994 (age 32)
- Place of birth: Quarteira, Portugal
- Height: 1.76 m (5 ft 9 in)
- Position: Left back

Team information
- Current team: Balzan
- Number: 42

Youth career
- 2002–2007: Quarteirense
- 2007–2009: Sporting CP
- 2009: Académica
- 2010: Louletano
- 2010–2011: Internacional Almancil
- 2011–2013: Porto

Senior career*
| Years | Team | Apps | (Gls) |
| 2013 | Porto B | 0 | (0) |
| 2013–2015 | Sheffield Wednesday | 1 | (0) |
| 2015–2016 | Belenenses | 0 | (0) |
| 2015 | → Casa Pia (loan) | 3 | (1) |
| 2016 | → Almancilense (loan) | 13 | (1) |
| 2016–2017 | Louletano | 17 | (1) |
| 2017 | Gil Vicente | 7 | (0) |
| 2017–2018 | Cova Piedade | 5 | (0) |
| 2018 | Stumbras | 10 | (2) |
| 2019 | Felgueiras 1932 | 13 | (0) |
| 2019–2020 | Olhanense | 6 | (1) |
| 2020–2021 | Panevėžys | 51 | (5) |
| 2022 | AC Oulu | 23 | (5) |
| 2023–2024 | Novi Pazar | 17 | (1) |
| 2024– | Balzan | 14 | (1) |

International career^{‡}
| 2012 | Portugal U18 | 3 | (0) |
| 2014 | Portugal U20 | 5 | (0) |
- * Club domestic league appearances and goals as of 26 June 2025 ‡ National team caps and goals as of 2 September 2023

Rafael da Silva Floro (born 19 January 1994) is a Portuguese professional footballer who plays as a left back for the team Balzan in the Maltese Premier League.

== Club career ==
Born in Quarteira, Algarve, Floro played youth football with six clubs, including local C.D.R. Quarteirense from ages 8 to 13. He finished his development with FC Porto and, although he was selected to some Segunda Liga matches by the B team to kickstart his senior career, he could never appear in the competition.

In summer 2013, Floro went on trial with English Football League Championship side Sheffield Wednesday, which had all of their full-backs injured, and signed a one-year contract on 6 August after impressing. That same day, he made his professional debut, being replaced midway through the second half of a 2–1 away loss against Rotherham United in the first round of the League Cup. His first league game took place on the 10th, when he played the first half of another 1–2 defeat, now at home to Burnley.

On 10 May 2015, after no further competitive appearances for the Owls, Floro was released. Shortly after, he returned to his country and joined Primeira Liga club C.F. Os Belenenses on a four-year deal. He also failed to play one single competitive match with the latter, being loaned to teams in the lower leagues.

Floro returned to the Portuguese second tier on 31 January 2017, penning a two-and-a-half-year contract with Gil Vicente F.C. after leaving Louletano DC. He continued to compete in that league but also the third, having abroad spells in Lithuania with FC Stumbras and FK Panevėžys and in Finland with AC Oulu.

== International career ==
In May 2014, Floro was picked by coach Ilídio Vale for his Portuguese under-20 squad which was due to appear in that year's Toulon Tournament. He made four appearances during the competition, helping his team to a final third position.

== Career statistics ==
=== Club ===
As of 17 February 2017

Club statistics
| Club | Season | League | | | Cup (Note: Includes the Taça de Portugal, FA Cup, Lithuanian Cup, Suomen Cup and Serbian Cup.) | | League cup (Note: Includes the Taça da Liga, EFL Cup and Finnish League Cup.) | | Continental (Note: Includes the UEFA Europa League.) | | Other | | Total | |
| Club | Season | Division | Apps | Goals | Apps | Goals | Apps | Goals | Apps | Goals | Apps | Goals | Apps | Goals |
|---|---|---|---|---|---|---|---|---|---|---|---|---|---|---|
| Porto B | 2012–13 | LigaPro | 0 | 0 | — | | — | | — | | 0 | 0 | 0 | 0 |
| Sheffield Wednesday | 2013–14 | Championship | 1 | 0 | 0 | 0 | 1 | 0 | — | | 0 | 0 | 2 | 0 |
| Sheffield Wednesday | 2014–15 | Championship | 0 | 0 | 0 | 0 | 0 | 0 | — | | 0 | 0 | 0 | 0 |
| Sheffield Wednesday | Total | | 1 | 0 | 0 | 0 | 1 | 0 | — | | 0 | 0 | 2 | 0 |
| Belenenses | 2015–16 | Primeira Liga | 0 | 0 | 0 | 0 | 0 | 0 | 0 | 0 | 0 | 0 | 0 | 0 |
| Casa Pia (loan) | 2015–16 | Campeonato de Portugal | 3 | 1 | 0 | 0 | — | | — | | 0 | 0 | 3 | 1 |
| Almancilense (loan) | 2015–16 | Campeonato de Portugal | 13 | 1 | — | | — | | — | | 0 | 0 | 13 | 1 |
| Louletano | 2016–17 | Campeonato de Portugal | 17 | 1 | 0 | 0 | — | | — | | 0 | 0 | 17 | 1 |
| Gil Vicente | 2016–17 | LigaPro | 7 | 0 | — | | — | | — | | 0 | 0 | 7 | 0 |
| Cova Piedade | 2017–18 | LigaPro | 5 | 0 | 1 | 0 | — | | — | | — | | 6 | 0 |
| Stumbras | 2018 | A Lyga | 10 | 2 | 2 | 0 | — | | — | | — | | 12 | 2 |
| Felgueiras 1932 | 2018–19 | Campeonato de Portugal | 13 | 0 | — | | — | | — | | — | | 13 | 0 |
| Olhanense | 2019–20 | Campeonato de Portugal | 6 | 1 | 1 | 0 | — | | — | | — | | 7 | 1 |
| Panevėžys | 2020 | A Lyga | 17 | 1 | 4 | 2 | — | | — | | — | | 21 | 3 |
| Panevėžys | 2021 | A Lyga | 34 | 4 | 4 | 0 | — | | 2 (Note: Appearances in UEFA Conference League) | 0 | 1 (Note: Includes Lithuanian Supercup) | 0 | 41 | 0 |
| Panevėžys | Total | | 51 | 5 | 8 | 2 | 0 | 0 | 2 | 0 | 1 | 0 | 62 | 7 |
| AC Oulu | 2022 | Veikkausliiga | 25 | 5 | 4 | 1 | 2 | 0 | — | | — | | 31 | 6 |
| Novi Pazar | 2023–24 | Serbian SuperLiga | 17 | 1 | 2 | 0 | — | | — | | — | | 19 | 1 |
| Balzan | 2024–25 | Maltese Premier League | 5 | 0 | — | | — | | — | | — | | 5 | 0 |
| Career total | | | 173 | 17 | 18 | 3 | 3 | 0 | 2 | 0 | 1 | 0 | 197 | 23 |
