= Tomislav Dadić =

Croatian footballer (born 1997)

Personal information
- Date of birth: 15 December 1997 (age 28)
- Place of birth: Split, Croatia
- Height: 1.85 m (6 ft 1 in)
- Position: Left-back

Team information
- Current team: Novi Pazar
- Number: 50

Youth career
- RNK Split
- 2012–2015: Dugopolje

Senior career*
Years	Team	Apps	(Gls)
2015–2017	Dugopolje	5	(0)
2016–2017	→ Hrvace (loan)	0	(0)
2017–2018	Osijek II	0	(0)
2017–2018	Hrvace	0	(0)
2018–2021	Dugopolje	43	(0)
2021–2022	Solin	22	(0)
2022–2023	Posušje	26	(0)
2023–2024	Široki Brijeg	13	(0)
2024–2025	Radnički 1923	61	(2)
2026	Rotor Volgograd	1	(0)
2026–	Novi Pazar	1	(0)
- * Club domestic league appearances and goals as of 16 May 2026

Tomislav Dadić (pronounced [tomislav dadiɕ]; born 15 December 1997) is a Croatian professional footballer who plays as a left-back for Serbian club Novi Pazar.

== Club career ==
Born in Split, Croatia, Dadić start his playing career in local clubs Dugopolje, Hrvace and Solin before on 20 June 2022 moving to Bosnian club Posušje where he stayed just on one year. On 20 June 2023, he joined from neighboring club Posušje on a free transfer in tho Premier League BH club Široki Brijeg where he signed a two-year contract with them, and where he stayed just for one season.

On 14 January 2024, he joined Serbian SuperLiga club Radnički 1923 where he signed a two-year contract.

On 11 February 2024, in a very uncertain and hard home match on Čika Dača Stadium against Radnički Niš, he made his debut in the Serbian SuperLiga, where his new team got a 3–2 victory.

== Honours ==
Individual

- Serbian SuperLiga Player of the Week: 2024–25 (Round 13)
