= Branislav Knežević =

Serbian professional footballer

Personal information
- Date of birth: 21 July 2002 (age 24)
- Place of birth: Mali Radinci, Serbia, FR Yugoslavia
- Height: 1.88 m (6 ft 2 in)
- Position: Midfielder

Team information
- Current team: FC Anyang
- Number: 18

Youth career
- Mačva Šabac

Senior career*
Years	Team	Apps	(Gls)
2020–2021	Mačva Šabac	36	(6)
2021–2023	Elche Ilicitano	33	(7)
2023–2026	Železničar Pančevo	96	(11)
2026–	FC Anyang	5	(0)

International career
2021	Serbia U19	2	(0)
- * Club domestic league appearances and goals as of 3 August 2026

Branislav Knežević (Serbian Cyrillic: Бранислав Кнежевић; born 21 July 2002) is a Serbian professional footballer who plays as a midfielder for FC Anyang.

== Club career ==
On 6 September 2021, he signed a three-year contract with Spanish La Liga club Elche and was initially assigned to the reserve team Elche Ilicitano.

== Career statistics ==
=== Club ===
As of 7 June 2020.

Club	Season	League			Cup		Continental		Other		Total	
Club	Season	Division	Apps	Goals	Apps	Goals	Apps	Goals	Apps	Goals	Apps	Goals
Mačva Šabac	2019–20	Serbian SuperLiga	1	0	0	0	0	0	0	0	1	0
Career total			1	0	0	0	0	0	0	0	1	0
