= Viktor Živojinović =

Serbian football player

Personal information
- Full name: Viktor Živojinović
- Date of birth: 15 March 1999 (age 27)
- Place of birth: Belgrade, FR Yugoslavia
- Height: 1.77 m (5 ft 10 in)
- Position: Winger

Team information
- Current team: Teleoptik
- Number: 8

Youth career
- Red Star Belgrade

Senior career*
Years	Team	Apps	(Gls)
2017–2018	Red Star Belgrade	0	(0)
2017–2018	→ Grafičar (loan)	10	(0)
2018–2019	Jedinstvo Ub	20	(10)
2019–2020	Voždovac	10	(0)
2020–2021	Proleter Novi Sad	53	(8)
2022–2023	Radnički Niš	5	(0)
2022	→ Jedinstvo Ub (loan)	14	(1)
2023	→ Rad (loan)	18	(7)
2023	IMT	13	(1)
2024	Aiolikos	7	(0)
2024–2025	Novi Pazar	5	(0)
2024–2025	→ Dubočica (loan)	25	(9)
2025	Petrovac	14	(2)
2026	Dubočica	14	(3)
2026–	Teleoptik	0	(0)

International career
2020	Serbia U21	1	(0)
- * Club domestic league appearances and goals as of 14 May 2026

Viktor Živojinović (Serbian Cyrillic: Виктор Живојиновић; born 15 March 1999) is a Serbian professional footballer who plays as a winger for Teleoptik.

== Honours ==
Individual

- Serbian SuperLiga Player of the Week: 2020–21 (Round 1), 2023–24 (Round 3)
