= Nikola Ćirković =

Serbian footballer

Nikola Ćirković Никола Ћирковић
Personal information
- Full name: Nikola Ćirković
- Date of birth: 4 December 1991 (age 34)
- Place of birth: Priboj, SR Serbia, SFR Yugoslavia
- Height: 1.88 m (6 ft 2 in)
- Positions: Right-back; midfielder

Team information
- Current team: Mladost Lučani
- Number: 30

Youth career
- Borac Čačak

Senior career*
Years	Team	Apps	(Gls)
2010–2015	Metalac Gornji Milanovac	110	(26)
2015	Minsk	0	(0)
2015–2019	Voždovac	113	(2)
2019–2021	Čukarički	50	(1)
2021–2022	Bnei Sakhnin	16	(0)
2022	Kafr Qasim	11	(0)
2022–	Mladost Lučani	127	(2)

International career
2016–2017	Serbia	2	(0)
- * Club domestic league appearances and goals as of 13 June 2026

Nikola Ćirković (Serbian Cyrillic: Никола Ћирковић; born 4 December 1991) is a Serbian footballer who plays for Mladost Lučani.

== International career ==
Ćirković made his international debut for Serbia in a friendly 3–0 loss to Qatar.
