= Nikola Mirković =

Serbian footballer (born 1991)

Personal information
- Full name: Nikola Mirković
- Date of birth: 26 July 1991 (age 35)
- Place of birth: Smederevo, SFR Yugoslavia
- Height: 1.91 m (6 ft 3 in)
- Position: Goalkeeper

Team information
- Current team: Smederevo 1924
- Number: 1

Senior career*
Years	Team	Apps	(Gls)
2009	Napredak Kruševac	5	(0)
2010	Železničar Smederevo		
2011	Mladi Radnik Požarevac	1	(0)
2011–2013	Spartak Subotica	1	(0)
2012	→ Zvijezda Gradačac (loan)	10	(0)
2013–2014	Zvijezda Gradačac	20	(0)
2014–2016	Spartak Subotica	46	(0)
2017	Rad	13	(0)
2017–2018	Atromitos	4	(0)
2019–2020	SønderjyskE	4	(0)
2021	Budućnost Dobanovci	16	(0)
2021	Mladost Novi Sad	19	(0)
2022	Budućnost Dobanovci	15	(0)
2022–2023	Metalac Gornji Milanovac	35	(0)
2023–2024	Novi Pazar	35	(0)
2024–2025	Čukarički	29	(0)
2026	Sogdiana	6	(0)
2026–	Smederevo 1924	0	(0)
- * Club domestic league appearances and goals as of 25 June 2026

Nikola Mirković (Serbian Cyrillic: Никола Мирковић; born 26 July 1991) is a Serbian professional footballer who plays as a goalkeeper for Smederevo 1924.

== Career ==
=== Atromitos ===
On 8 July 2017, he was purchased outright by the Super League Greece team Atromitos, with whom he signed a two-year contract expiring on 30 June 2019.

=== SønderjyskE ===
On 28 January 2019, Mirkovic went on a trial to SønderjyskE and joined the squad, which at that time was in Turkey. The trial was successful, and the club announced on 6 February 2019, that they had signed the keeper for the remainder of the season. His contract was terminated by mutual agreement on 5 October 2020.

== Honours ==
SønderjyskE

- Danish Cup: 2019–20
