= Aleksandar Mesarović =

Serbian footballer

Personal information
- Date of birth: 27 September 1998 (age 28)
- Place of birth: Krčedin, FR Yugoslavia
- Height: 1.76 m (5 ft 9 in)
- Position: Attacking midfielder

Team information
- Current team: Maxline Vitebsk
- Number: 27

Youth career
- –2017: Vojvodina

Senior career*
Years	Team	Apps	(Gls)
2017–2019	Vojvodina	47	(0)
2019–2020	Napredak Kruševac	1	(0)
2020–2021	Kabel	34	(12)
2021–2022	IMT	4	(0)
2022–2024	Radnički Niš	76	(3)
2024–2025	Novi Pazar	30	(3)
2025–	Maxline Vitebsk	27	(5)

International career
2015–2016	Serbia U18	9	(0)
2016	Serbia U19	2	(0)
2017–2018	Serbia U21	6	(0)
- * Club domestic league appearances and goals as of 4 July 2026

Aleksandar Mesarović (Serbian Cyrillic: Александар Месаровић; born 27 September 1998) is a Serbian footballer who plays for Maxline Vitebsk.

== Club career ==
=== Vojvodina ===
Originating from Krčedin, Mesarović came through the Vojvodina youth academy and joined the first-team at the age of 18. On 28 June 2017, Mesarović signed his first professional contract, penning a four-year deal with the club. Passing the complete pre-season with the first team, Mesarović made his official debut for the club as a playmaker in 2–1 victory over MFK Ružomberok in the first leg of the first qualifying round for 2017–18 UEFA Europa League. He also made his Serbian SuperLiga debut on 21 July 2017, in 1–0 home win against Čukarički.

=== Radnički Niš ===
On 20 January 2022 as midfielder and a member of the Serbia national team under the age of 18, 19 and 21, and former Vojvodina prospect Mesarović join to Meraklije. In the Novi Sad team, he already collaborated with coach Radoslav Batak who leads Meraklije at the moment. After Vojvodina, and several spells to perform Napredak and Kabel, he arrived in Niš from IMT. He signed with Radnički Niš as a free agent.

== International career ==
In summer 2015, Ivan Tomić invited Mesarović in Serbia u18 team. After a year with the selection, Mesarović was also a member of the under-19 level, making 2 appearances at the memorial tournament "Stevan Vilotić - Ćele" in matches against France and Israel. Mesarović got his first call in Serbian under-21 team by coach Goran Đorović in August 2017. Mesarović made his debut for the team in 4–0 victory over Gibraltar u21 at the Jagodina City Stadium on 1 September 2017.

== Career statistics ==
=== Club ===
As of 11 December 2023

Appearances and goals by club, season and competition
Club	Season	League			Cup		Continental		Other		Total	
Club	Season	Division	Apps	Goals	Apps	Goals	Apps	Goals	Apps	Goals	Apps	Goals
Vojvodina	2016–17	Serbian SuperLiga	0	0	0	0	—		—		0	0
Vojvodina	2017–18	Serbian SuperLiga	32	0	2	0	2	0	—		36	0
Vojvodina	2018–19	Serbian SuperLiga	15	0	2	0	—		—		17	0
Vojvodina	Total		47	0	4	0	2	0	—		53	0
Napredak Kruševac	2019–20	Serbian SuperLiga	1	0	1	0	—		—		1	0
Kabel	2019–20	Serbian First League	6	0	—		—		—		6	0
Kabel	2020–21	Serbian First League	28	12	1	1	—		—		29	13
Kabel	Total		34	12	1	1	—		—		35	13
IMT	2021–22	Serbian First League	4	0	—		—		—		4	0
Radnički Niš	2021–22	Serbian SuperLiga	16	1	1	0	—		—		17	1
Radnički Niš	2022–23	Serbian SuperLiga	31	0	3	0	2	0	1	0	37	0
Radnički Niš	2023–24	Serbian SuperLiga	14	1	0	0	—		—		14	1
Radnički Niš	Total		61	2	4	0	2	0	1	0	68	2
Career total			147	14	10	1	4	0	1	0	162	15

== Honours ==
Individual

- Serbian SuperLiga Player of the Week: 2023–24 (Round 18), 2024–25 (Round 31)
