= Adetunji Adeshina =

Nigerian footballer (born 2004)

Personal information
- Full name: Adetunji Razaq Adeshina
- Date of birth: 2 December 2004 (age 21)
- Place of birth: Ibadan, Nigeria
- Position: Midfielder

Team information
- Current team: Slaven Belupo (on loan from LASK)
- Number: 22

Youth career
- –2022: Real Sapphire F.C.
- 2023: Novi Pazar

Senior career*
Years	Team	Apps	(Gls)
2023–2025	Novi Pazar	66	(11)
2025–	LASK	1	(0)
2026–	LASK Amateure	1	(0)
2026–	→ Slaven Belupo (loan)	0	(0)
- * Club domestic league appearances and goals as of 11 July 2026

Adetunji Razaq Adeshina (born 2 December 2004) is a Nigerian professional footballer who plays as a midfielder for Croatian Football League club Slaven Belupo, on loan from Austrian Bundesliga club LASK.

== Club career ==
Adeshina came to Europe from Real Sapphire F.C.. He then played in the Novi Pazar youth academy before making his debut in the senior squad during the 2022–23 Serbian SuperLiga.

== Career statistics ==
As of match played 28 October 2025

Appearances and goals by club, season and competition
Club	Season	League			Cup		Other		Total	
Club	Season	Division	Apps	Goals	Apps	Goals	Apps	Goals	Apps	Goals
Novi Pazar	2022–23	Serbian SuperLiga	4	0	1	0	—		5	0
Novi Pazar	2023–24	Serbian SuperLiga	27	5	2	0	—		29	5
Novi Pazar	2024–25	Serbian SuperLiga	35	6	3	1	—		38	7
Novi Pazar	Total		66	11	6	1	—		72	12
LASK	2025–26	Austrian Bundesliga	1	0	1	0	—		2	0
Career total			67	11	7	1	0	0	74	12

== Honours ==
LASK

- Austrian Cup: 2025–26
