= Radivoj Bosić =

Serbian footballer

Personal information
- Full name: Radivoj Bosić
- Date of birth: 1 December 2000 (age 25)
- Place of birth: Belgrade, FR Yugoslavia
- Height: 1.83 m (6 ft 0 in)
- Position: Winger

Team information
- Current team: Maxline Vitebsk
- Number: 12

Youth career
- Red Star Belgrade

Senior career*
Years	Team	Apps	(Gls)
2018	Red Star Belgrade	0	(0)
2018	→ Grafičar Beograd (loan)	12	(3)
2019	Partizan	0	(0)
2019–2020	FC Wil	19	(1)
2020–2021	Olimpija Ljubljana	21	(3)
2021–2022	Nacional	8	(0)
2022	Spartak Subotica	8	(0)
2023–2024	Javor Ivanjica	51	(7)
2024–2026	Radnički Niš	49	(11)
2026	TSC	16	(4)
2026–	Maxline Vitebsk	5	(1)

International career
2016	Serbia U17	2	(1)
2018–2019	Serbia U19	5	(0)
2020	Serbia U21	2	(0)
- * Club domestic league appearances and goals as of 6 September 2026

Radivoj Bosić (born 1 December 2000) is a Serbian professional footballer who plays as a winger for Maxline Vitebsk.

== Club career ==
On 23 January 2023, Bosić signed a three-year contract with Javor Ivanjica.

== Honours ==
Olimpija Ljubljana

- Slovenian Cup: 2020–21
