= Seydouba Soumah =

Guinean footballer (born 1991)

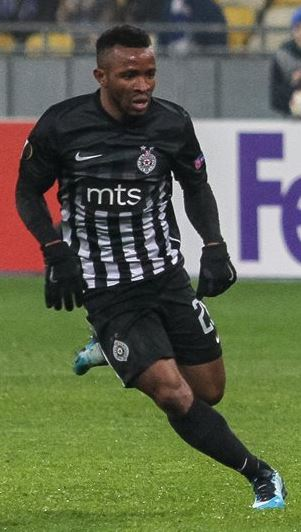
- Soumah with Partizan in 2017

Personal information
- Full name: Seydouba Soumah
- Date of birth: 11 June 1991 (age 35)
- Place of birth: Conakry, Guinea
- Height: 1.61 m (5 ft 3 in)
- Position: Attacking midfielder

Youth career
- Fello Star
- 2005–2008: Ajax Cape Town

Senior career*
Years	Team	Apps	(Gls)
2008–2011	Ajax Cape Town	10	(1)
2008–2009	→ Ikapa Sporting (loan)	13	(3)
2009–2010	→ Cape Town (loan)	7	(0)
2011	University of Pretoria		
2012	Nitra	22	(6)
2013–2017	Slovan Bratislava	83	(30)
2015–2016	→ Qadsia (loan)		
2017–2021	Partizan	78	(19)
2018–2019	→ Maccabi Haifa (loan)	6	(0)
2021–2022	Kuwait SC		
2023–2024	Novi Pazar	26	(5)

International career^{‡}
2013–	Guinea	37	(9)
- * Club domestic league appearances and goals as of 31 May 2024 ‡ National team caps and goals as of 3 January 2022

Seydouba Soumah (born 11 June 1991) is a Guinean professional footballer who plays as an attacking midfielder.

== Club career ==
=== Ajax Cape Town ===
Born in Conakry, Guinea, Soumah began his football career playing on the streets, before moving to South Africa and joining the youth system of Ajax Cape Town as a teenager. He was initially sent out on season-long loans to National First Division sides Ikapa Sporting (2008–09) and FC Cape Town (2009–10), before returning to his parent club.

On 21 January 2011, Soumah made his debut for Ajax in the Premier Soccer League, coming off the bench in a 3–0 away victory against Platinum Stars. He scored his first goal in a 2–1 home win over Mpumalanga Black Aces on 6 March. In total, Soumah made 10 appearances in the 2010–11 season, as the club finished as runners-up.

In September 2011, Soumah moved to National First Division side University of Pretoria. He bagged two goals in the first half of 2011–12 season. In January 2012, Tuks manager Steve Barker revealed that Soumah parted ways with the club.

=== Nitra ===
In February 2012, Soumah arrived to Europe and signed a three-year contract with Slovak club Nitra. He scored two times until the end of the 2011–12 season. On 14 September 2012, Soumah received a red card in a 3–1 home league loss to Spartak Trnava, alongside two other teammates. He was later fined €3,400 and banned from football for six months for making an obscene gesture towards fans, assaulting the opponent's players and threatening the referee during that match.

=== Slovan Bratislava ===
In December 2012, Soumah was transferred to fellow Slovak club Slovan Bratislava for a fee of €150,000. He signed a long-term contract and was given the number 20 shirt. Through the remainder of the season, Soumah made 13 appearances and won the double. He also helped the club win the second title in a row in the 2013–14 season, scoring two goals in 21 games. In July 2014, Soumah celebrated by lifting the Slovak Super Cup trophy after Slovan beat MFK Košice 1–0.

In July 2015, Soumah moved to Kuwait Premier League side Qadsia on a season-long loan. He netted seven league goals to help the club win the 2015–16 title. Soumah also made two appearances in the 2015 AFC Cup, scoring one goal.

Following his loan spell at Qadsia, Soumah returned to Slovan and by the end of November 2016 had extended his contract with the club until the summer of 2020. He would become the league's joint top scorer in the 2016–17 season, alongside Filip Hlohovský, with 20 goals. Soumah also helped the club win the Slovak Cup, scoring the last goal of a 3–0 win over MFK Skalica in the final. He finished the season as the team's top scorer with 25 goals in 39 appearances across all competitions. Due to his performances, Soumah was also named in the league's best eleven.

=== Partizan ===
On 18 July 2017, it was announced that Soumah completed his transfer to Serbian club Partizan, making him the club's most expensive signing ever at €1,650 million. He was officially presented on 20 July, penning a three-year contract and receiving the number 20 jersey. Two days later, Soumah made his debut for Partizan as a second-half substitute in an eventual 6–1 home league victory over Mačva Šabac. He scored his first goal for the club on 29 July, helping his team to a 2–1 win versus Javor Ivanjica at home. On 2 August, Soumah scored a goal in a 2–2 away draw with Olympiacos in the return leg of the UEFA Champions League third qualifying round, as Partizan got eliminated 5–3 on aggregate. He later scored in a 4–0 away win over Videoton in the second leg of the UEFA Europa League play-off round, helping the team progress to the group stage. On 13 December, Soumah converted a penalty in a 1–1 home draw with Red Star Belgrade. This was the first penalty awarded to Partizan in the Eternal derby after more than 22 years.

==== Loan to Maccabi Haifa ====
In September 2018, Soumah was loaned to Israeli Premier League side Maccabi Haifa until the end of the season with an option for three more.

==== Return to Partizan ====
After completing his loan spell, Soumah returned to Partizan in 2019 and entered the final year of his contract. He scored the equalizer in an eventual 2–1 home win over Molde in the first leg of the Europa League play-off round. On September 22, 2019, Soumah scored another goal in the Eternal Derby in a 2–0 win over Red Star. Marko Marin's pass was intercepted by Asano in the middle of the pitch, Milunović failed to control the ball when (The Black-Whites) reserve Seydouba Soumah went towards the goal, who then sent a projectile from 17 meters and placed the "ladybug" in the upper right corner of the goal, which was guarded by Milan Borjan.

== International career ==
Soumah made his senior debut for Guinea in a 1–1 friendly draw against Senegal on 5 February 2013. He netted his first national team goal later that year in a 4–2 away loss to Egypt in a 2014 World Cup qualifier.

On 15 November 2014, Soumah scored his first ever hat-trick in a 4–1 away win over Togo in a 2015 AFCON qualifier. He scored two more goals during qualifying, helping his country qualify for the tournament and earning a spot on the final 23-man roster. He appeared in two matches as Guinea progressed through the group stage with three draws but got eliminated in the quarter-finals by Ghana.

In November 2018, Soumah was dropped from the squad for his lack of commitment. He returned to the squad in December 2019 and played for 76 minutes against Namibia on 17 November 2019. In November 2021, he appeared against Guinea-Bissau and Morocco. His most recent appearance was against Rwanda on 3 January 2022.

== Career statistics ==
=== Club ===
As of match played 26 August 2021

Club	Season	League			National Cup		League Cup		Continental		Other		Total	
Club	Season	Division	Apps	Goals	Apps	Goals	Apps	Goals	Apps	Goals	Apps	Goals	Apps	Goals
Ajax Cape Town	2010–11	Premier Soccer League	10	1	0	0	—		—		—		10	1
Nitra	2011–12	Slovak First League	13	2	0	0	—		—		—		13	2
Nitra	2012–13	Slovak First League	9	4	0	0	—		—		—		9	4
Nitra	Total		32	6	0	0	—		—		—		32	7
Slovan Bratislava	2012–13	Slovak First League	11	0	2	0	—		0	0	—		13	0
Slovan Bratislava	2013–14	Slovak First League	21	2	3	1	—		1 (Note: Appearance(s) in UEFA Champions League)	0	—		25	3
Slovan Bratislava	2014–15	Slovak First League	22	8	1	0	—		10 (Note: Six appearances in UEFA Champions League, four appearances and one goal in UEFA Europa League)	1	—		33	9
Slovan Bratislava	2016–17	Slovak First League	29	20	7	5	—		3 (Note: Appearance(s) in UEFA Europa League)	0	—		39	25
Slovan Bratislava	2017–18	Slovak First League	0	0	0	0	—		0	0	1 (Note: Appearance in Czechoslovak Supercup)	0	1	0
Slovan Bratislava	Total		83	30	13	6	—		14	1	2	0	111	37
Partizan	2017–18	Serbian SuperLiga	22	3	1	0	—		8 (Note: One appearance and one goal in UEFA Champions League, seven appearances and one goal in UEFA Europa League)	2	—		31	5
Partizan	2018–19	Serbian SuperLiga	4	0	0	0	—		5	1	—		9	1
Partizan	2019–20	Serbian SuperLiga	25	10	2	0	—		12	4	—		39	14
Partizan	2020–21	Serbian SuperLiga	25	5	2	0	—		3	1	—		30	6
Partizan	2021–22	Serbian SuperLiga	2	1	0	0	—		3	0	—		5	1
Partizan	Total		78	19	5	0	—		31	8	—		114	27
Novi Pazar	2023–24	Serbian SuperLiga	26	5	1	0	—		—		—		27	5
Career total			225	60	21	7	0	0	45	9	2	0	291	77

=== International ===
As of 3 January 2022

National team	Year	Apps	Goals
Guinea	2013	5	1
Guinea	2014	7	5
Guinea	2015	5	0
Guinea	2016	2	1
Guinea	2017	5	0
Guinea	2018	3	1
Guinea	2019	3	0
Guinea	2020	0	0
Guinea	2021	4	1
Guinea	2022	3	0
Total		37	9

=== International goals ===
Scores and results list Guinea's goal tally first.

No.	Date	Venue	Opponent	Score	Result	Competition
1	10 September 2013	El Gouna Stadium, El Gouna, Egypt	Egypt	2–2	2–4	2014 FIFA World Cup qualification
2	5 September 2014	Stade Mohammed V, Casablanca, Morocco	Togo	1–0	2–1	2015 Africa Cup of Nations qualification
3	15 November 2014	Stade de Kégué, Lomé, Togo	Togo	2–0	4–1	2015 Africa Cup of Nations qualification
4	15 November 2014	Stade de Kégué, Lomé, Togo	Togo	3–0	4–1	2015 Africa Cup of Nations qualification
5	15 November 2014	Stade de Kégué, Lomé, Togo	Togo	4–0	4–1	2015 Africa Cup of Nations qualification
6	19 November 2014	Stade Mohammed V, Casablanca, Morocco	Uganda	2–0	2–0	2015 Africa Cup of Nations qualification
7	13 November 2016	Stade du 28 Septembre, Conakry, Guinea	DR Congo	1–0	1–2	2018 FIFA World Cup qualification
8	9 September 2018	Stade du 28 Septembre, Conakry, Guinea	Central African Republic	1–0	1–0	2019 Africa Cup of Nations qualification
9	24 March 2021	Stade du 28 Septembre, Conakry, Guinea	Mali	1–0	1–0	2021 Africa Cup of Nations qualification

== Honours ==
=== Club ===
Slovan Bratislava

- Slovak Super Liga: 2012–13, 2013–14
- Slovak Cup: 2012–13, 2016–17
- Slovak Super Cup: 2014

Qadsia

- Kuwait Premier League: 2015–16

Partizan

- Serbian Cup: 2017–18

=== Individual ===
- Slovak Super Liga Top Scorer: 2016–17
- Slovak Super Liga Top Eleven: 2016–17
