= Filip Bačkulja =

Serbian football player

Personal information
- Date of birth: 25 June 2002 (age 24)
- Place of birth: Kraljevo, FR Yugoslavia
- Height: 1.87 m (6 ft 2 in)
- Position: Centre-back

Team information
- Current team: Koper
- Number: 5

Youth career
- Brodarac
- 2020–2021: Juniors OÖ

Senior career*
Years	Team	Apps	(Gls)
2020–2022	Juniors OÖ	6	(0)
2021–2022	→ Metalac Gornji Milanovac (loan)	28	(1)
2022–2024	Metalac Gornji Milanovac	57	(1)
2024–2026	Novi Pazar	41	(3)
2026–	Koper	9	(0)

International career
2021	Serbia U20	1	(0)
2021	Serbia U21	1	(0)
- * Club domestic league appearances and goals as of 19 September 2026

Filip Bačkulja (Serbian Cyrillic: Филип Бачкуља; born 25 June 2002) is a Serbian footballer who plays as a centre-back for Slovenian PrvaLiga club Koper.

== Club career ==
On 26 June 2026, Bačkulja signed a two-year contract with Koper in Slovenia.

== International career ==
Bačkulja debut for Serbia U21 national team was on 6 June 2021 in a friendly match against Russia U21.
