= Strahinja Manojlović =

Bosnian footballer

Personal information
- Full name: Strahinja Manojlović
- Date of birth: 11 August 2002 (age 24)
- Place of birth: Zvornik, Bosnia and Herzegovina
- Height: 1.90 m (6 ft 3 in)
- Position: Goalkeeper

Team information
- Current team: Radnički Niš
- Number: 98

Youth career
- Zvijezda 09

Senior career*
| Years | Team | Apps | (Gls) |
| 2019–2021 | Zvijezda 09 | 15 | (0) |
| 2021 | Mačva Šabac | 6 | (0) |
| 2022 | Grafičar Beograd | 28 | (0) |
| 2023–2024 | Javor Ivanjica | 54 | (0) |
| 2024– | Radnički Niš | 47 | (0) |

International career^{‡}
| 2020–2021 | Bosnia and Herzegovina U19 | 4 | (0) |
| 2023-2024 | Serbia U21 | | |
- * Club domestic league appearances and goals as of 13 June 2026 ‡ National team caps and goals as of 22 November 2024

Strahinja Manojlović (Serbian Cyrillic: Страхиња Манојловић; born 11 August 2002) is a Bosnian professional footballer who plays as a goalkeeper for Radnički Niš.

He represented Bosnia and Herzegovina under 19 internationally.

== Club career ==
He played with Zvijezda 09 in Premier League of Bosnia and Herzegovina and later moved to Mačva Šabac. The whole 2022. he spent with Grafičar Beograd before he signed four-year contract with the Serbian SuperLiga side Javor.

== Honours ==
Individual

- Serbian SuperLiga Player of the Week: 2025–26 (Round 6),
