= Mitar Ergelaš =

Serbian association football player

Personal information
- Date of birth: 5 August 2002 (age 24)
- Place of birth: Ruma, FR Yugoslavia
- Height: 1.78 m (5 ft 10 in)
- Position: Midfielder

Team information
- Current team: Mačva Šabac
- Number: 10

Youth career
- Vojvodina
- 2017–2020: Čukarički

Senior career*
| Years | Team | Apps | (Gls) |
| 2020–2025 | Čukarički | 42 | (1) |
| 2022–2023 | → Novi Pazar (loan) | 38 | (3) |
| 2025 | → Sloven Ruma (loan) | 15 | (2) |
| 2025– | Mačva Šabac | 31 | (9) |

International career^{‡}
| 2018–2019 | Serbia U17 | 14 | (2) |
| 2022 | Serbia U19 | 3 | (0) |
| 2023 | Serbia U21 | 5 | (0) |
- * Club domestic league appearances and goals as of 14 May 2026 ‡ National team caps and goals as of 16 October 2023

Mitar Ergelaš (Serbian Cyrillic: Митар Ергелаш; born 5 August 2002) is a Serbian footballer who plays as a midfielder for Mačva Šabac.

== Career statistics ==
=== Club ===
As of 13 June 2020

| Club | Season | League | | | Cup | | Continental | | Other | | Total | |
| Club | Season | Division | Apps | Goals | Apps | Goals | Apps | Goals | Apps | Goals | Apps | Goals |
|---|---|---|---|---|---|---|---|---|---|---|---|---|
| Čukarički | 2019–20 | Serbian SuperLiga | 1 | 0 | 0 | 0 | 0 | 0 | 0 | 0 | 1 | 0 |
| Career total | | | 1 | 0 | 0 | 0 | 0 | 0 | 0 | 0 | 1 | 0 |
