= Nikola Karaklajić (footballer) =

Serbian footballer

Personal information
- Full name: Nikola Karaklajić
- Date of birth: 5 February 1995 (age 31)
- Place of birth: Belgrade, FR Yugoslavia
- Height: 1.75 m (5 ft 9 in)
- Position: Right wing

Team information
- Current team: İmişli
- Number: 10

Senior career*
Years	Team	Apps	(Gls)
2013–2014	Red Star Belgrade	1	(0)
2013–2014	→ Voždovac (loan)	14	(2)
2014	→ Sinđelić Beograd (loan)	10	(2)
2015	Voždovac	6	(1)
2015	Čukarički	1	(0)
2016	Příbram	0	(0)
2017	Javor Ivanjica	5	(0)
2017–2020	Iskra Danilovgrad	81	(5)
2020–2021	Aspropyrgos		
2021	Inđija	0	(0)
2021	Anagennisi Karditsa	2	(0)
2021–2023	Panachaiki	20	(0)
2023–2024	Novi Pazar	32	(5)
2024–2025	Napredak Kruševac	28	(2)
2025–	İmişli	27	(0)

International career^{‡}
2013	Serbia U17	1	(0)
2013	Serbia U18	2	(0)
2015	Serbia U20	2	(0)
- * Club domestic league appearances and goals as of 15 June 2026 ‡ National team caps and goals as of 15 June 2015

Nikola Karaklajić (Serbian Cyrillic: Никола Караклајић; born 5 February 1995) is a Serbian professional footballer who plays as an attacking midfielder for Azerbaijan Premier League club İmişli.

== Career ==
=== Red Star Belgrade ===
He made his professional debut for Red Star Belgrade on 26 May 2013, in Serbian SuperLiga match versus Vojvodina.

== Career statistics ==
As of 17 June 2017

Club performance			League		Cup		Continental		Total	
Season	Club	League	Apps	Goals	Apps	Goals	Apps	Goals	Apps	Goals
2012–13	Red Star	SuperLiga	1	0	–				1	0
2013–14	Voždovac (loan)	SuperLiga	14	2	–				14	2
2014–15	Sinđelić BG (loan)	First League	10	2	1	0	–		11	2
2014–15	Voždovac	SuperLiga	6	1	1	0	–		7	1
2015–16	Čukarički	SuperLiga	1	0	1	0	–		2	0
2016–17	Javor	SuperLiga	5	0	1	0	–		6	0
Career total			37	5	4	0	0	0	41	5
