= Milan Obradović (footballer, born 1999) =

Serbian footballer

Personal information
- Date of birth: 27 December 1999 (age 26)
- Place of birth: Brus, SFR Yugoslavia
- Height: 1.89 m (6 ft 2 in)
- Position: Defender

Team information
- Current team: Ansan Greeners
- Number: 15

Youth career
- Kopaonik Brus
- Župa Aleksandrovac
- –2018: Napredak Kruševac

Senior career*
Years	Team	Apps	(Gls)
2018–2020	Napredak Kruševac	32	(0)
2018–2019	→ GSP Polet Dorćol (loan)	15	(0)
2020–2022	Wisła Płock	9	(0)
2022–2024	Javor Matis	58	(2)
2024–2025	Muaither	13	(2)
2026–	Ansan Greeners	15	(2)
- * Club domestic league appearances and goals as of 6 August 2025

Milan Obradović (born 27 December 1999) is a Serbian professional footballer who plays as a defender for South Korean K League 2 club Ansan Greeners.

== Career ==
He made his Serbian Super Liga debut with Napredak Kruševac in March 2019.
