= Petar Gigić =

Serbian footballer

Personal information
- Date of birth: 7 March 1997 (age 29)
- Place of birth: Priština, FR Yugoslavia
- Height: 1.84 m (6 ft 0 in)
- Positions: Forward; winger

Team information
- Current team: Khujand
- Number: 9

Youth career
- 2004–2012: Radnički Niš
- 2012–2015: OFK Beograd

Senior career*
Years	Team	Apps	(Gls)
2015–2017	OFK Beograd	26	(4)
2017–2019	Mačva Šabac	30	(7)
2019–2021	Partizan	3	(0)
2020	→ Mačva Šabac (loan)	8	(2)
2020	→ Újpest (loan)	10	(1)
2021	→ Novi Pazar (loan)	13	(2)
2021	Mačva Šabac	15	(1)
2022	Železničar Pančevo	17	(9)
2022–2023	Javor Ivanjica	52	(11)
2024	Boluspor	13	(0)
2024	Panserraikos	8	(0)
2025	Železničar Pančevo	11	(2)
2025	Rudar Prijedor	10	(0)
2026–	Khujand	2	(0)

International career
2015	Serbia U18	5	(1)
2015	Serbia U19	1	(0)
- * Club domestic league appearances and goals as of 16 March 2026

Petar Gigić (Serbian Cyrillic: Петар Гигић; born 7 March 1997) is a Serbian professional footballer who plays as a forward for Tajikistan Higher League club Khujand.

== Career ==
On 22 July 2019, Gigić signed a four-year contract with the Belgrade club. Partizan compensated Mačva with €150,000. On 19 September 2019, Gigić made his Partizan debut after he came on as an 87th-minute substitute, in the UEFA Europa League game against AZ Alkmaar.

== Honours ==
Individual

- Serbian SuperLiga Player of the Week: 2022–23 Round 4,
