= Ebenezer Annan =

Ghanaian footballer (born 2002)

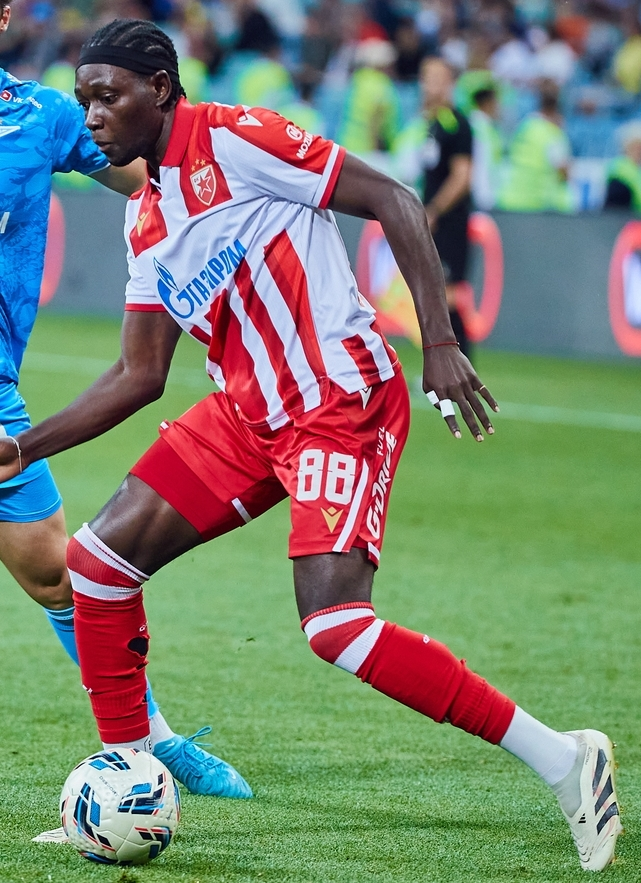

Personal information
- Date of birth: 21 August 2002 (age 24)
- Place of birth: Accra, Ghana
- Height: 1.78 m (5 ft 10 in)
- Position: Left-back

Team information
- Current team: Rapid București (on loan from Saint-Étienne)
- Number: 27

Youth career
- –2020: GS Felino
- 2021–2022: Bologna

Senior career*
Years	Team	Apps	(Gls)
2021–2024	Bologna	1	(0)
2022–2023	→ Imolese (loan)	27	(0)
2023–2024	→ Novi Pazar (loan)	30	(0)
2024–2025	Red Star Belgrade	17	(1)
2024	→ OFK Beograd (loan)	19	(0)
2025–	Saint-Étienne	18	(0)
2026	Saint-Étienne B	4	(0)
2026–	→ Rapid București (loan)	5	(0)

International career^{‡}
2024–	Ghana	7	(0)
- * Club domestic league appearances and goals as of 30 October 2026 ‡ National team caps and goals as of 12 October 2025

Ebenezer Annan (born 21 August 2002) is a Ghanaian professional footballer who plays as a left-back for Liga I club Rapid București, on loan from Ligue 2 club Saint-Étienne, and the Ghana national team.

== Club career ==
Annan joined Bologna in 2020. He became a key figure in their Primavera squad, featuring in many games between 2020 and 2022. Annan was first called up to the senior team in August 2021 during Bologna's 2021–22 preseason tour. Ahead of Bologna's Coppa Italia game against Ternana he was called up again in the process making his professional debut in that game on 16 August 2021, starting and playing 56 minutes before being substituted for Musa Barrow as Bologna lost by 5–4. He was subsequently named on the bench for their Serie A match against Salernitana on 22 August. On 22 January 2022, he made his Serie A debut after coming on for Arthur Theate in the 66th minute in their 2–1 defeat to Hellas Verona. Annan played for Italian Serie C club Imolese in the 2022–23 season.

On 7 July 2023, Annan joined Serbian SuperLiga club Novi Pazar on a one-year loan with an option to make the move permanent at the end of the 2023–24 season.

In June 2024, Red Star Belgrade signed Annan on a three-year contract, with an option to extend for an additional year. Before the start of the season, he was loaned to newly promoted OFK Beograd on a one-year deal.

In January 2025, Annan returned to Red Star Belgrade following a productive loan spell at OFK Beograd, where he made 19 appearances and made four assists. Upon his return, he quickly established himself as a key figure in the squad, contributing significantly to Red Star's successful campaign to secure the 2024–25 Serbian SuperLiga title. This triumph marked the first major silverware of Annan's professional career.

=== Saint-Étienne ===
On 7 August 2025, Annan signed for Ligue 2 club Saint-Étienne on a three-year deal.

== International career ==
Annan made his debut for the Ghana national team in friendly games played in March 2024.

== Career statistics ==
=== Club ===
As of match played 30 October 2026

Appearances and goals by club, season and competition
Club	Season	League			National cup (Note: Includes Coppa Italia, Coppa Italia Serie C, Serbian Cup, Coupe de France, Cupa României)		Europe		Other		Total	
Club	Season	Division	Apps	Goals	Apps	Goals	Apps	Goals	Apps	Goals	Apps	Goals
Bologna	2021–22	Serie A	1	0	1	0	–		–		2	0
Imolese (loan)	2022–23	Serie C	27	0	1	0	–		–		28	0
Novi Pazar (loan)	2023–24	Serbian SuperLiga	30	0	2	0	–		–		32	0
Red Star Belgrade	2024–25	Serbian SuperLiga	16	1	3	0	0	0	–		19	1
Red Star Belgrade	2025–26	Serbian SuperLiga	1	0	–		0	0	–		1	0
Red Star Belgrade	Total		17	1	3	0	0	0	–		20	1
OFK Beograd (loan)	2024–25	Serbian SuperLiga	19	0	0	0	–		–		19	0
Saint-Étienne	2025–26	Ligue 2	18	0	1	0	–		0	0	19	0
Saint-Étienne	2026–27	Ligue 2	0	0	–		–		–		0	0
Saint-Étienne	Total		18	0	1	0	–		0	0	19	0
Saint-Étienne B	2025–26	Championnat National 3	4	0	–		–		–		4	0
Rapid București (loan)	2026–27	Liga I	5	0	1	0	–		–		6	0
Career total			121	1	9	0	0	0	0	0	130	1

=== International ===
As of match played 12 October 2025

Appearances and goals by national team and year
National team	Year	Apps	Goals
Ghana	2024	4	0
Ghana	2025	3	0
Total		6	0

== Honours ==
Red Star Belgrade

- Serbian SuperLiga: 2024–25
- Serbian Cup: 2024–25
