= Emir Azemović =

Montenegrin footballer (born 1997)

Personal information
- Date of birth: 6 January 1997 (age 29)
- Place of birth: Novi Pazar, FR Yugoslavia
- Height: 1.90 m (6 ft 3 in)
- Position: Centre-back

Team information
- Current team: Elbasani
- Number: 25

Youth career
- –2014: AS Novi Pazar
- 2014–2015: Partizan
- 2015–2016: Benfica

Senior career*
Years	Team	Apps	(Gls)
2016–2017	Benfica B	0	(0)
2017	→ Fafe (loan)	2	(0)
2017–2018	Domžale	1	(0)
2018–2019	Zemun	26	(1)
2019–2020	Raków Częstochowa	12	(0)
2020–2022	Aluminij	64	(1)
2022–2023	Kolubara	6	(0)
2023–2024	Novi Pazar	31	(0)
2024–	Elbasani	26	(0)

International career
2014	Serbia U17		
2017–2018	Montenegro U21	14	(1)
- * Club domestic league appearances and goals as of 24 June 2026

Emir Azemović (born 6 January 1997) is a Montenegrin professional footballer who plays as a centre-back for Albanian club Elbasani.

== Club career ==
Hailing from Novi Pazar, Azemović began his youth career at local club AS Novi Pazar, before joining Partizan's youth system, where he spent two years.

In August 2015, Azemović signed a five-year contract with Portuguese side Benfica, and was immediately assigned to their B team in the second-tier LigaPro. His deal included a salary of €7,000 per month. He made two appearances on the Benfica B bench in September, but did not earn a cap. Instead, he spent most of the season with the Benfica U19 team, appearing in three UEFA Youth League games.

In January 2017, Azemović was loaned out to Fafe, another LigaPro team, until the end of the season. He made his professional debut four months later, playing the full 90 minutes in a 3–1 win over Gil Vicente.

On 5 August 2020, he returned to Slovenia and signed with Aluminij.

In August 2022, Azemović joined Serbian side Kolubara.

In July 2023, Azemović signed with Novi Pazar on a one-year deal, remaining in Serbia.

== International career ==
Born in Novi Pazar, capital of the Raška District in Southern Serbia and bordering Montenegro, Azemović represented Serbia in 2014 at U17 level. However, by 2017, he was convinced by the Montenegrin FA to switch sporting nationality and represent Montenegro, having debuted in 2017 with their U21 level.
