= Nikola Andrić (footballer) =

Serbian footballer

Personal information
- Date of birth: 23 May 1992 (age 34)
- Place of birth: Belgrade, FR Yugoslavia
- Height: 1.83 m (6 ft 0 in)
- Position: Right-back

Team information
- Current team: Mladost Lučani
- Number: 7

Youth career
- Rabrovac

Senior career*
| Years | Team | Apps | (Gls) |
| 2009–2010 | Mladenovac | 25 | (2) |
| 2012–2016 | ŽP Šport Podbrezová | 61 | (1) |
| 2016–2019 | Mladost Lučani | 97 | (0) |
| 2020–2021 | Vojvodina | 38 | (1) |
| 2022 | Radnički Kragujevac | 17 | (0) |
| 2022–2023 | Borac Banja Luka | 14 | (1) |
| 2023 | Radnički Niš | 7 | (0) |
| 2023 | Novi Pazar | 7 | (0) |
| 2024- | Mladost Lučani | 94 | (1) |
- * Club domestic league appearances and goals as of 13 June 2026

Nikola Andrić (Serbian Cyrillic: Никола Андрић; born 23 May 1992) is a Serbian professional footballer who plays as a defender for Mladost Lučani.

== Career ==
Andrić made his first-team debut for Mladenovac in the Serbian League Belgrade. He later moved abroad to Slovakia and joined ŽP Šport Podbrezová.

In June 2016, Andrić returned to his homeland and signed with Serbian SuperLiga club Mladost Lučani.

On 23 January 2020, Andrić signed with Serbian SuperLiga club Vojvodina from Novi Sad.

== Honours ==
Vojvodina

- Serbian Cup: 2019–20
