= Marko Obradović =

Serbian footballer

Personal information
- Full name: Marko Obradović
- Date of birth: 30 June 1991 (age 35)
- Place of birth: Belgrade, SFR Yugoslavia
- Height: 1.87 m (6 ft 2 in)
- Position: Forward

Team information
- Current team: Napredak Kruševac
- Number: 91

Youth career
- Zemun
- 2009: Partizan

Senior career*
Years	Team	Apps	(Gls)
2009–2011	Eupen	44	(11)
2011–2012	Boussu Dour	17	(3)
2013–2017	Radnik Bijeljina	116	(41)
2017	Aktobe	14	(2)
2018	Yenisey Krasnoyarsk	27	(8)
2019	Torpedo-BelAZ Zhodino	21	(5)
2020	Okzhetpes	10	(2)
2021–2022	Neftchi Fergana	17	(12)
2022	Spartak Subotica	17	(2)
2023	Metallurg Bekabad	10	(0)
2023–2024	Novi Pazar	22	(5)
2024–	Napredak Kruševac	22	(1)

International career
2007–2008	Serbia U17	5	(0)
2010	Montenegro U19	2	(1)
- * Club domestic league appearances and goals as of 15 June 2025

Marko Obradović (Serbian Cyrillic: Марко Обрадовић; born 30 June 1991) is a Serbian footballer who plays as a forward who plays for Napredak Kruševac.

== Club career ==
Born in Belgrade, SR Serbia, he played in the youth team of FK Zemun before coming to FK Partizan in early 2009. He played with the youth team of Partizan until summer 2009 when he begin his senior career by moving abroad to Belgium and joining K.A.S. Eupen where he played the following 2 years. After playing the first season in the Belgian Second Division they reached promotion and Obradović played with Eupen in the Belgian Pro League in the club's only season in the top tier. However Eupen ended the season relegated and Obradović moved to another Second League club, Boussu Dour Borinage and played with them in the 2011-12 season. During the winter break of the 2012-13 season, Obradović moved to Bosnia and Herzegovina and signed with Premier League side FK Radnik Bijeljina.

On 13 February 2018, Yenisey Krasnoyarsk announced the signing of Obradović. On 16 January 2019, his contract with Yenisey was dissolved by mutual consent. On 24 January 2019, he signed with Belarusian club Torpedo-BelAZ Zhodino.

On 6 February 2020, FC Okzhetpes announced the signing of Obradović on a contract until the end of 2020. Subsequently, he had spells at Neftchi Fergana in Azerbaijan and Spartak Subotica in Serbia, before returning to Azerbaijan in January 2023, signing with Metallurg Bekabad.

== International career ==
Obradović played for Serbia at 2008 Under-17 Euro. In 2010 he played two friendlies for Montenegro U19 team.

== Honours ==
Radnik Bijeljina

- Bosnian Cup: 2015–16
