= Novi Pazar City Stadium =

Football stadium in Novi Pazar, Serbia

Coordinates: 43°08′03.25″N 20°30′57.84″E

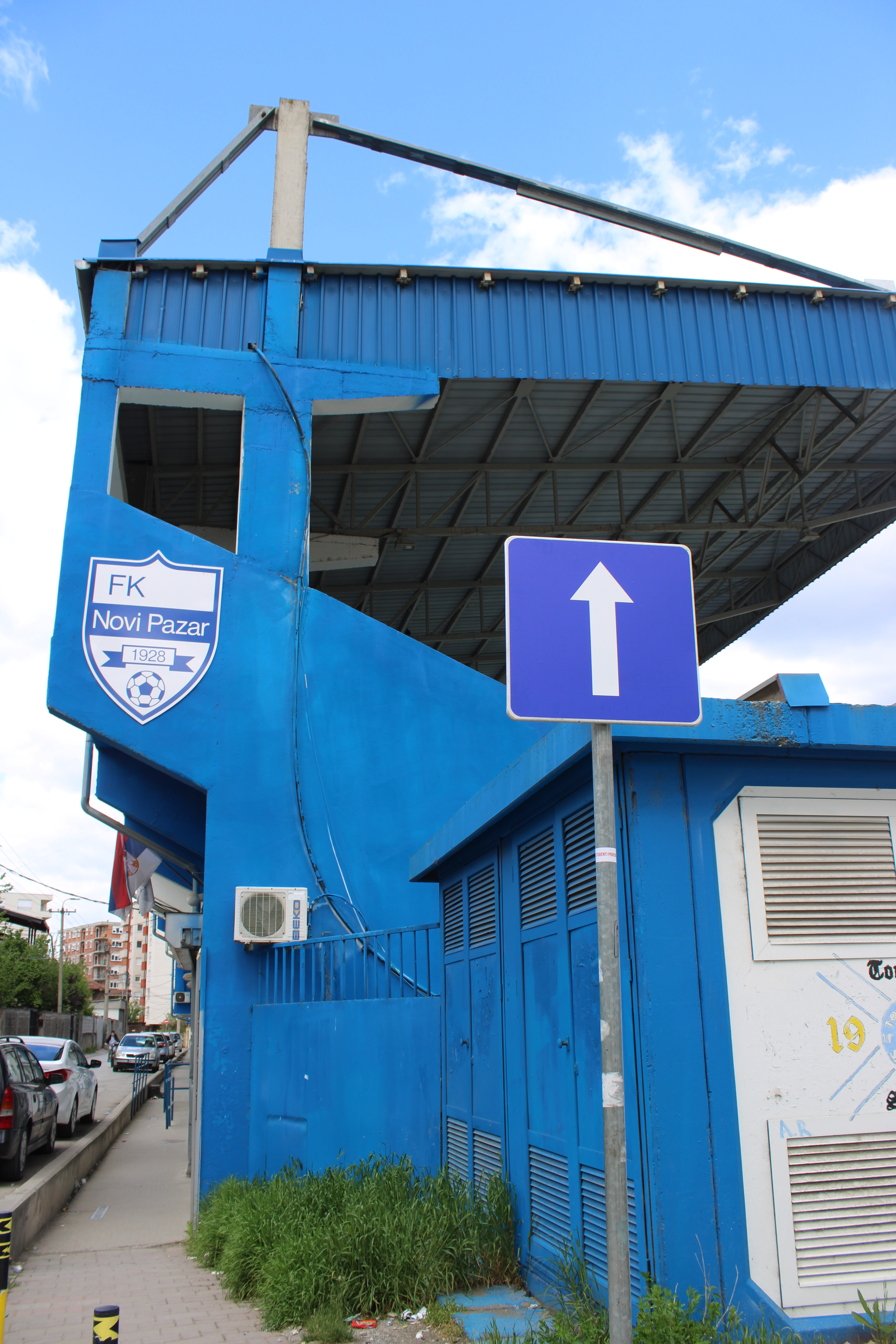
- Interactive map of Novi Pazar City Stadium
- Full name: Novi Pazar City Stadium
- Location: Novi Pazar, Serbia
- Operator: FK Novi Pazar and FK Jošanica
- Capacity: 10,000
- Surface: Hybrid grass
- Scoreboard: No

Construction
- Opened: 2012
- Renovated: 2011–2014
- Cost: approximately €2 million (2011–2012 reconstruction)

Tenant
- FK Novi Pazar (2012–present)

Novi Pazar City Stadium (Serbian: Gradski stadion Novi Pazar) is a football stadium in Novi Pazar, Serbia and the home of FK Novi Pazar. The stadium currently has a seating capacity of 10,000 people.

== History ==
Novi Pazar's City Stadium began a complete overhaul in 2011. The cost of the project was reported to be around €2 million. The stadium was opened to the public after reconstruction on 12 April 2012.

=== Reconstruction ===
The stadium began undergoing complete reconstruction during the first half of 2011 in an ambitious project by the Football Association of Serbia and the city of Novi Pazar. The project includes the renovation of the eastern, west and northern stands. When reconstruction finished, the stadium's seating capacity was increased to 10,000 spectators. The project includes also the covering of the whole stadium, new floodlights, new locker and press room, new ambulance, parking area, ticket office. After reconstruction, the stadium is expected to fulfill the most up to date UEFA standards. The cost of the project is estimated to be over 230 million Serbian dinars (2 million euros).

== See also ==
- List of stadiums in Serbia
