= List of FK Napredak Kruševac managers =

FK Napredak Kruševac is a professional football club based in Kruševac, Serbia.

== Managers ==
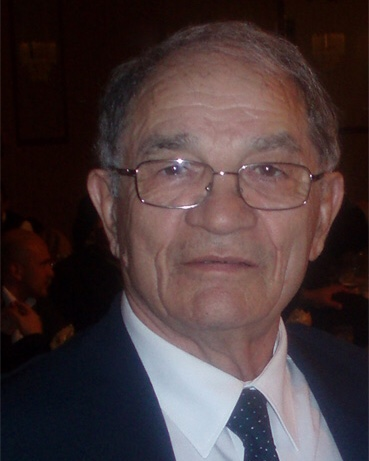
Dragoslav Šekularac

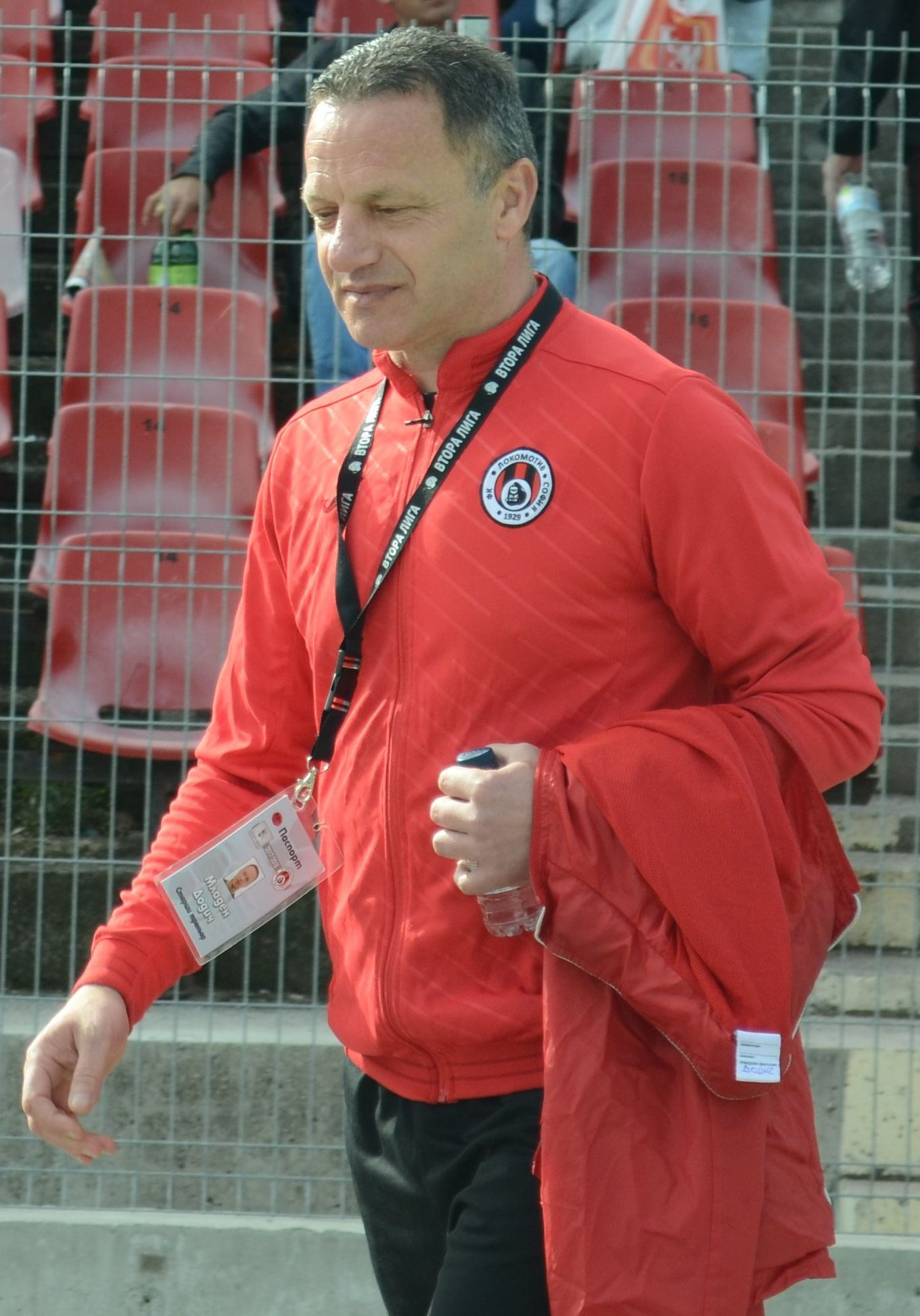
Mladen Dodić

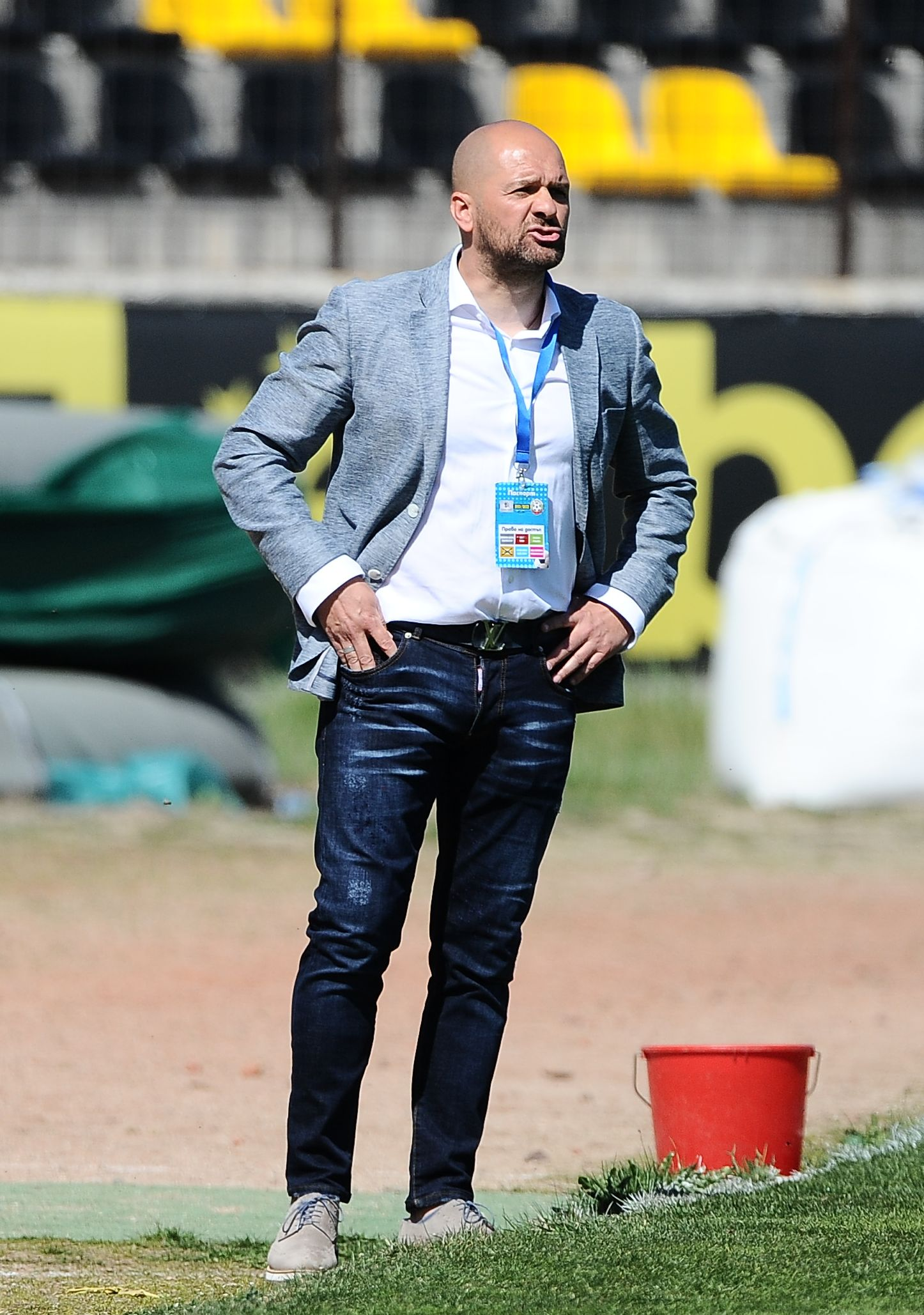
Slavko Matić

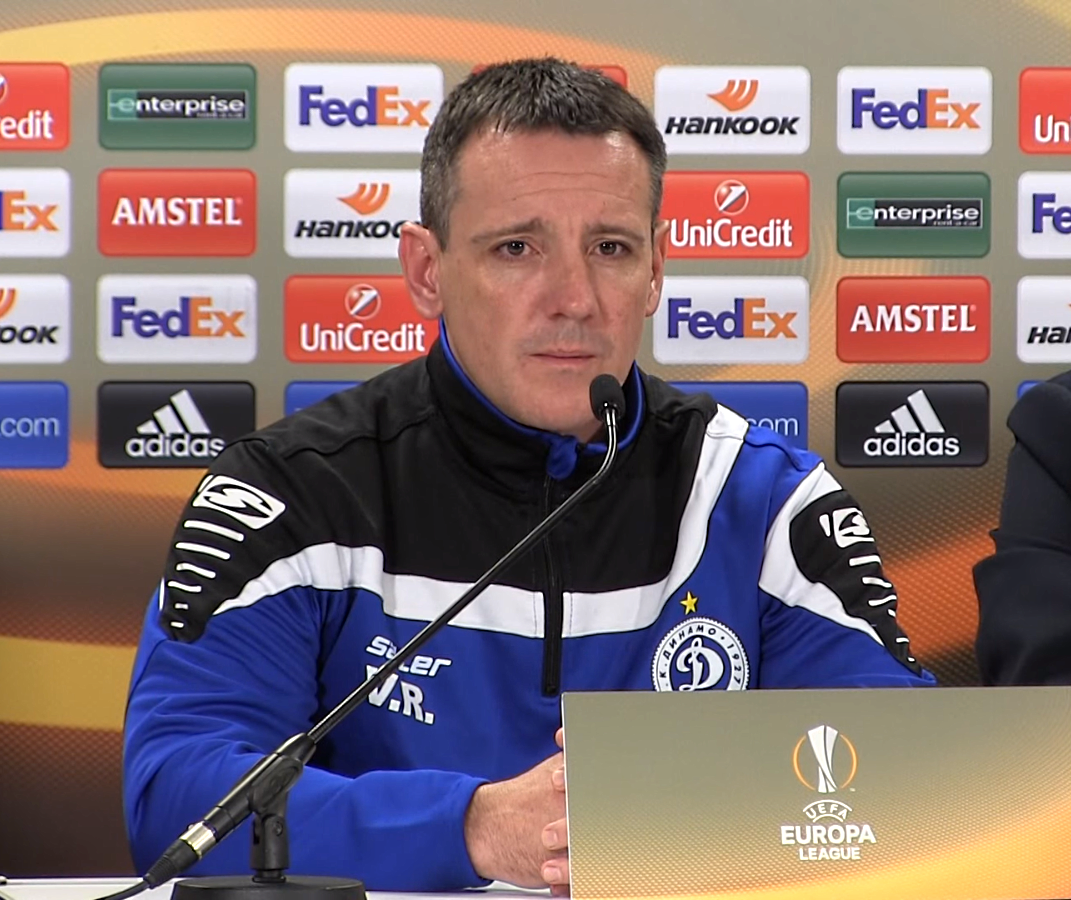
Vuk Rašović

Name	Period		Pld	W	D	L	Win %	Honours
Name	From	To	Pld	W	D	L	Win %	Honours
(Socialist Federal Republic of Yugoslavia) Svetislav Ninković								
(Socialist Federal Republic of Yugoslavia) Momčilo Borović								
(Socialist Federal Republic of Yugoslavia) Radoslav Petaković								
(Socialist Federal Republic of Yugoslavia) Momčilo Borović	1951	1951						
(Socialist Federal Republic of Yugoslavia) Mirko Bonačić								
(Socialist Federal Republic of Yugoslavia) Momčilo Borović								
(Socialist Federal Republic of Yugoslavia) Branislav Hrnjiček								
(Socialist Federal Republic of Yugoslavia) Aleksandar Atanacković								
(Socialist Federal Republic of Yugoslavia) Branislav Popović								
(Socialist Federal Republic of Yugoslavia) Miroslav Petrović								
(Socialist Federal Republic of Yugoslavia) Boško Ralić	1958	1959						
(Socialist Federal Republic of Yugoslavia) Dragoslav Filipović								
(Socialist Federal Republic of Yugoslavia) Mladen Sarić								
(Socialist Federal Republic of Yugoslavia) Prvoslav Dragićević								
(Socialist Federal Republic of Yugoslavia) Đorđe Bjelogrlić								
(Socialist Federal Republic of Yugoslavia) Jovan Vuković								
(Socialist Federal Republic of Yugoslavia) Marko Valok	1967	1968						
(Socialist Federal Republic of Yugoslavia) Mićko Stefanović	1968	1969						
(Socialist Federal Republic of Yugoslavia) Ilija Rajković	1969							
(Socialist Federal Republic of Yugoslavia) Simo Vilić								
(Socialist Federal Republic of Yugoslavia) Ratomir Čabrić		1973						
(Socialist Federal Republic of Yugoslavia) Šefket Luković								
(Socialist Federal Republic of Yugoslavia) Radojica Radojičić								
(Socialist Federal Republic of Yugoslavia) Dragan Bojović	1974	1976						1975–76 Yugoslav Second League (Group East)
(Socialist Federal Republic of Yugoslavia) Vladica Popović	1976	1977						
(Socialist Federal Republic of Yugoslavia) Boris Marović	1977							
(Socialist Federal Republic of Yugoslavia) Srećko Petković		1978						1977–78 Yugoslav Second League (Group East)
(Socialist Federal Republic of Yugoslavia) Dragoljub Milošević	1978	1979						
(Socialist Federal Republic of Yugoslavia) Vladimir Milosavljević	1979	1979						
(Socialist Federal Republic of Yugoslavia) Tomislav Kaloperović	1979	1980						
(Socialist Federal Republic of Yugoslavia) Miljenko Mihić	July 1980							
(Socialist Federal Republic of Yugoslavia) Milovan Đorić	January 1981	1981						
(Socialist Federal Republic of Yugoslavia) Dušan Varagić	June 1981							
(Socialist Federal Republic of Yugoslavia) Ivan Ivanović		August 1983						
(Socialist Federal Republic of Yugoslavia) Dragan Bojović	1983							
(Socialist Federal Republic of Yugoslavia) Vladimir Milosavljević								
(Socialist Federal Republic of Yugoslavia) Josip Duvančić		1985						
(Socialist Federal Republic of Yugoslavia) Đorđe Gerum	1985	1986						
(Socialist Federal Republic of Yugoslavia) Momčilo Ilić	1986	1987						
(Socialist Federal Republic of Yugoslavia) Vladimir Milosavljević	1987	1989						1987–88 Yugoslav Second League (Group East)
(Socialist Federal Republic of Yugoslavia) Dragiša Ilić	1989							
(Socialist Federal Republic of Yugoslavia) Dragoljub Kostić								
(Socialist Federal Republic of Yugoslavia) Josip Duvančić		1990						
(Socialist Federal Republic of Yugoslavia) Vladimir Milosavljević								
(Socialist Federal Republic of Yugoslavia) Ivan Ivanović	1991	1991						
(Socialist Federal Republic of Yugoslavia) Dušan Radonjić	1991	1992						
(Federal Republic of Yugoslavia) Jovica Škoro	1992							
(Federal Republic of Yugoslavia) Vladimir Milosavljević		1993						
(Federal Republic of Yugoslavia) Jovica Škoro	July 1993	1993						
(Federal Republic of Yugoslavia) Branko Babić	1993	1993						
(Federal Republic of Yugoslavia) Miroslav Miladinović	1993	1993						
(Federal Republic of Yugoslavia) Miroslav Ivković	1993							
(Federal Republic of Yugoslavia) Slobodan Dogandžić		1994						
(Federal Republic of Yugoslavia) Dragoljub Kostić	1994							
(Federal Republic of Yugoslavia) Vladimir Milosavljević		September 1995						
(Federal Republic of Yugoslavia) Boško Prodanović	1995	1996						
(Federal Republic of Yugoslavia) Pavle Jevtić	1996	1996						
(Federal Republic of Yugoslavia) Jovica Škoro	1996	1996						
(Federal Republic of Yugoslavia) Dragoslav Šekularac	September 1996	1997						
(Federal Republic of Yugoslavia) Vladimir Jocić		1998						
(Federal Republic of Yugoslavia) Slavko Jović	1998							
(Federal Republic of Yugoslavia) Miladin Pešterac								
(Federal Republic of Yugoslavia) Jovica Škoro								
(Federal Republic of Yugoslavia) Miljojko Gošić		2000						1999–2000 Second League of FR Yugoslavia (Group East)
(Federal Republic of Yugoslavia) Miroslav Ivković	2000	September 2000						
(Federal Republic of Yugoslavia) Slavoljub Pavlović	2000	December 2000						
(Federal Republic of Yugoslavia) Vladislav Đukić	December 2000	2001						
(Federal Republic of Yugoslavia) Vladimir Milosavljević	2001	2001						
(Federal Republic of Yugoslavia) Zvonimir Petrović								
(Serbia and Montenegro) Vladislav Đukić								2002–03 Second League of Serbia and Montenegro (Group East)
(Serbia and Montenegro) Dragiša Ilić		2004						
(Serbia and Montenegro) Mladen Dodić	2004	2005						
(Serbia) Jovica Škoro	2005	March 2007						
(Serbia) Mladen Dodić	March 2007	September 2007						
(Serbia) Zvonimir Petrović (caretaker)	September 2007	October 2007						
(Serbia) Saša Nikolić	October 2007	June 2008						
(Serbia) Jovica Škoro	June 2008	December 2008						
(Serbia) Nenad Sakić	December 2008	November 2009						
(Serbia) Jovica Škoro	2009	2010						
(Serbia) Miljojko Gošić	2010	2010						
(Serbia) Borislav Zogović	2010	September 2010						
(Serbia) Dragan Antić	September 2010	2011						
(Serbia) Živojin Vidojević	2011	September 2011						
(Serbia) Mladen Dodić	September 2011	December 2011						
(Serbia) Aleksandar Kristić	December 2011	May 2012	14	9	3	2	64.29	
(Serbia) Marko Mitrović (caretaker)	May 2012	May 2012	1	0	1	0	0.00	
(Serbia) Slobodan Filipović (caretaker)	May 2012	June 2012	2	1	0	1	50.00	
(Serbia) Nenad Milovanović	June 2012	June 2013	35	25	6	4	71.43	2012–13 Serbian First League
(Serbia) Milan Lešnjak	June 2013	September 2013						
(Serbia) Nenad Milovanović	September 2013	January 2014						
(Serbia) Nenad Lalatović	January 2014	June 2014						
(Cyprus) Siniša Gogić	June 2014	August 2014						
(Serbia) Branko Smiljanić	August 2014	October 2014						
(Serbia) Saša Štrbac	October 2014	January 2015						
(Serbia) Slavko Matić	January 2015	May 2015						
(Serbia) Ljubiša Stamenković	May 2015	June 2015						
(Serbia) Bogić Bogićević	July 2015	May 2016						2015–16 Serbian First League
(Serbia) Dragan Ivanović	June 2016	December 2016						
(Serbia) Vuk Rašović	December 2016	May 2017						
(Serbia) Nenad Sakić	July 2017	September 2017						
(Serbia) Milorad Kosanović	September 2017	May 2019						
(Serbia) Predrag Rogan	June 2019	December 2019						
(Serbia) Ivan Stefanović	December 2019	March 2020						
(Serbia) Ivan Babić (caretaker)	March 2020	March 2020						
(Serbia) Dragan Ivanović	March 2020	September 2020						
(Serbia) Ivan Babić (caretaker)	September 2020	October 2020						
(Serbia) Goran Stevanović	October 2020	December 2020						
(Serbia) Milan Đuričić	December 2020	December 2021						
(Serbia) Ivan Stefanović	January 2022	March 2022						
(Serbia) Zoran Milinković	March 2022	May 2022						
(Serbia) Dušan Đorđević	June 2022	February 2023						
(Serbia) Dragan Perišić	February 2023	October 2023						
(Serbia) Mladen Dodić (caretaker)	October 2023	November 2023						
(Serbia) Vladimir Gaćinović	November 2023	April 2024						
(Serbia) Ivan Stefanović	April 2024	May 2024						
(Serbia) Goran Stevanović	June 2024	November 2024						
(Serbia) Zoran Ristić (caretaker)	November 2024	December 2024						
(Serbia) Slavoljub Đorđević	December 2024	March 2025						
(Serbia) Mladen Dodić	March 2025	May 2025						
(Serbia) Zoran Ristić (caretaker)	May 2025	June 2025						
(Serbia) Milan Nikolić	June 2025	September 2025						
(Montenegro) Radoslav Batak	September 2025	December 2025						
(Montenegro) Nikola Drinčić	December 2025	February 2026						
(Serbia) Zoran Ristić (caretaker)	February 2026							
