= 2021–22 Serbian SuperLiga =

16th season of Serbian SuperLiga

SuperLiga
- Season: 2021–22
- Dates: 16 July 2021 – 22 May 2022
- Champions: Red Star Belgrade; 8th SuperLiga title 33rd domestic title
- Relegated: Metalac; Proleter
- Champions League: Red Star Belgrade
- Europa League: Partizan
- Europa Conference League: Čukarički; Radnički Niš
- Matches: 296
- Goals: 758 (2.56 per match)
- Top goalscorer: Ricardo Gomes (29 goals)
- Biggest home win: Čukaricki 6–1 Proleter; Partizan 5–0 Spartak; Čukaricki 5–0 Kolubara; Red Star Belgrade 5–0 Novi Pazar
- Biggest away win: Kolubara 1–7 Red Star Belgrade
- Highest scoring: TSC 4–4 Radnički 1923; Kolubara 1–7 Red Star Belgrade
- Longest winning run: Red Star Belgrade 10 games
- Longest unbeaten run: Partizan, Red Star Belgrade 24 games
- Longest winless run: Proleter 14 games
- Longest losing run: Mladost, Radnički 1923, Vojvodina 6 games
- All statistics correct as of 22 May 2022.

The 2021–22 Serbian SuperLiga (known as the Linglong Tire SuperLiga for sponsorship reasons) was the 16th season of the Serbian SuperLiga. Red Star were the defending champions, having won their 7th SuperLiga and 32nd domestic title in the previous season. Start and end dates, fixtures and competition format were released on 22 June 2021.

== Summary ==
The number of teams in the league for this season was reduced from 20 to 16 from last season which had increased number of teams due to COVID-19 pandemic. Before the start of the season, on 16 June 2021, it was announced that number of teams in the league will again be reduced at the end of season - this time to 14. Because of that 4 teams will be relegated while only 2 will be promoted from Serbian First League. Rule about bonus players was also changed for this season - each team now must have at least one player born in 2000 or younger in the squad for the duration of entire match.

Decision about decreasing number of teams for a next season was revised on 6 July 2021 when Football Association of Serbia decided that number of teams in top flight will remain 16. Format was officially reverted to the one used in 19–20 season - each team will play each other twice in round-robin format after which top half will play in Championship round and bottom half in Relegation-round play-offs. Last two teams from Relegation round will be relegated while teams finishing 13th and 14th will play Relegations play-off against teams who finished 3rd and 4th in Serbian First League. Rule about foreign players registration was also changed. Instead of maximum of 4 foreign players in match protocol teams can now have unlimited number of foreign players with maximum of 4 at the pitch at any time. For the first time in Serbian SuperLiga history Video assistant referee will be used on all matches.

This season marked the start of a new three-year TV deal. Deal was signed with Telekom Srbija and their subsidiary Arena Channels Group. They will pay 3 million-a-year for the next three seasons, a record breaking deal for Serbian SuperLiga.

=== Impact of COVID-19 pandemic ===
At the start of this season it was announced that, for the first time since 2019–20 season, attendance will be allowed for all matches. With limitation that no more than 50% of maximum capacity can be filled.

== Teams ==
Locations of the 2021–22 Serbian SuperLiga teams
Locations of the 2021–22 Serbian SuperLiga teams on the territory of Belgrade

Sixteen teams competed in the league; the top 14 from previous season and two teams promoted from Serbian First League. Promoted teams were Radnički 1923 who returned to the top flight after an absence of six years, and Kolubara who were promoted to the SuperLiga for the first time in their history. They replaced Javor, Rad, Bačka, Inđija, Mačva and Zlatibor.

=== Venues ===
Čukarički	Kolubara	Metalac	Mladost
Čukarički Stadium	Kolubara Stadium	Metalac Stadium	Mladost Stadium
Capacity: 4,070	Capacity: 2,500	Capacity: 4,400	Capacity: 5,944
Napredak Kruševac	Novi Pazar	Partizan	Proleter
Mladost Stadium	City Stadium	Partizan Stadium	Karađorđe Stadium
Capacity: 10,331	Capacity: 13,000	Capacity: 29,775	Capacity: 14,458
Radnički 1923	Radnički Niš	Radnik	Red Star Belgrade
Čika Dača	Čair Stadium	City Stadium	Rajko Mitić Stadium
Capacity: 15,100	Capacity: 18,151	Capacity: 3,312	Capacity: 51,755
Spartak Subotica	TSC	Vojvodina	Voždovac
City Stadium	TSC Arena	Karađorđe Stadium	Shopping Center Stadium
Capacity: 13,000	Capacity: 4,500	Capacity: 14,458	Capacity: 5,175

=== Personnel, Kits and General sponsor ===
Note: Flags indicate national team as has been defined under FIFA eligibility rules. Players and Managers may hold more than one non-FIFA nationality.

Team	Head coach	Captain	Kit manufacturer	General Sponsor
Čukarički	(Serbia) Milan Lešnjak	(Serbia) Marko Docić	Adidas	Oliva
Kolubara	(Serbia) Dejan Đurđević	(Serbia) Nikola Vasiljević	Seven	Oktagonbet
Metalac	(Serbia) Milija Žižić	(Serbia) Ilija Milićević	NAAI	Metalac AD
Mladost	(Serbia) Dragiša Žunić	(Serbia) Ivan Milošević	Miteks	Miteks
Napredak	(Serbia) Zoran Milinković	(Serbia) Dejan Kerkez	Givova	mt:s
Novi Pazar	(Serbia) Tomislav Sivić	(Serbia) Mirza Delimeđac	Nike	Novi Pazar Put
Partizan	(Serbia) Aleksandar Stanojević	(Serbia) Lazar Marković	Nike	mt:s
Proleter	(Serbia) Dušan Bajić	(Serbia) Branislav Jovanović	Wulfz	Wulfz
Radnički 1923	(Serbia) Nenad Lalatović	(Serbia) Stevan Kovačević	Jako	Mozzart Bet
Radnički	(Montenegro) Radoslav Batak	(Serbia) Nikola Stevanović	Macron	mt:s
Radnik	(Serbia) Dušan Đorđević	(Serbia) Uroš Stojanović	Jako	Efbet
Red Star Belgrade	(Serbia) Dejan Stanković	(Canada) Milan Borjan	Macron	Gazprom
Spartak	(Serbia) Nebojša Vučković	(Serbia) Mihajlo Ivančević	Legea	Vinarija Čoka
TSC	(Serbia) Žarko Lazetić	(Serbia) Saša Tomanović	Capelli Sport	SAT-TRAKT
Vojvodina	(Montenegro) Dragan Radojičić	(Serbia) Nemanja Čović	Kelme	Srbijagas
Voždovac	(Serbia) Aleksandar Linta	(Serbia) Stefan Hajdin	Adidas	Stadion SC

Nike is the official ball supplier for Serbian SuperLiga.

Kelme is the official sponsor of the Referee's Committee of the Football Association of Serbia.

=== Managerial changes ===
Team	Outgoing manager	Manner of departure	Date of vacancy	Position in the table	Incoming manager	Date of appointment
Kolubara	(Serbia) Zoran Milinković	Signed with Borac Banja Luka	24 May 2021	Pre-season	(Montenegro) Dragan Radojičić	9 June 2021
Novi Pazar	(Serbia) Davor Berber	Contract expired	28 May 2021	Pre-season	(Serbia) Milan Milanović	9 June 2021
Radnik	(Serbia) Slavoljub Đorđević	Signed with Vojvodina	9 June 2021	Pre-season	(Serbia) Igor Bondžulić	14 June 2021
Vojvodina	(Serbia) Nenad Lalatović	Signed with Radnički	9 June 2021	Pre-season	(Serbia) Slavoljub Đorđević	9 June 2021
Radnički 1923	(Serbia) Dejan Joksimović	Contract expired	10 June 2021	Pre-season	(Serbia) Vladimir Radenković	10 June 2021
Radnički	(Serbia) Aleksandar Stanković	Contract expired	11 June 2021	Pre-season	(Serbia) Nenad Lalatović	11 June 2021
Kolubara	(Montenegro) Dragan Radojičić	Sacked	13 June 2021	Pre-season	(Serbia) Dejan Đurđević	13 June 2021
Mladost	(Serbia) Darko Rakočević	Contract expired	19 June 2021	Pre-season	(Serbia) Ivan Stefanović	19 June 2021
Radnički	(Serbia) Nenad Lalatović	Signed with Al Batin	24 June 2021	Pre-season	(Serbia) Aleksandar Stanković	26 June 2021
Proleter	(Serbia) Branko Žigić	Sacked	4 August 2021	14th	(Serbia) Dušan Bajić	8 August 2021
Čukarički	(Serbia) Dušan Đorđević	Sacked	16 August 2021	6th	(Serbia) Saša Ilić	17 August 2021
Radnički	(Serbia) Aleksandar Stanković	Sacked	24 August 2021	12th	(Serbia) Radomir Koković	1 September 2021
Radnik	(Serbia) Igor Bondžulić	Sacked	10 September 2021	9th	(Serbia) Dušan Đorđević	13 September 2021
Novi Pazar	(Serbia) Milan Milanović	Sacked	13 September 2021	15th	(Serbia) Kenan Kolašinac	13 September 2021
Radnički	(Serbia) Radomir Koković	Sacked	21 September 2021	12th	(Montenegro) Radoslav Batak	23 September 2021
Voždovac	(Serbia) Predrag Rogan	Sacked	22 September 2021	9th	(Serbia) Aleksandar Linta	24 September 2021
Spartak	(Serbia) Vladimir Buač	Sacked	3 October 2021	13th	(Serbia) Vladimir Gaćinović	7 October 2021
Novi Pazar	(Serbia) Kenan Kolašinac	Sacked	16 October 2021	16th	(Montenegro) Dragan Radojičić	16 September 2021
TSC	(Serbia) Mladen Krstajić	Sacked	19 October 2021	4th	(Serbia) Mirko Jovanović	26 October 2021
Radnički 1923	(Serbia) Vladimir Radenković	Sacked	15 November 2021	14th	(Serbia) Zoran Milinković	15 November 2021
TSC	(Serbia) Mirko Jovanović	Sacked	29 November 2021	8th	(Serbia) Žarko Lazetić	29 November 2021
Metalac	(Serbia) Žarko Lazetić	Signed with TSC	29 November 2021	14th	(Serbia) Milija Žižić	29 November 2021
Napredak	(Serbia) Milan Đuričić	Mutual termination	27 December 2021	5th	(Serbia) Ivan Stefanović	3 January 2022
Mladost	(Serbia) Ivan Stefanović	Mutual termination	3 January 2022	11th	(Serbia) Dragiša Žunić	3 January 2022
Radnički 1923	(Serbia) Zoran Milinković	Sacked	7 February 2022	16th	(Serbia) Nenad Lalatović	7 February 2022
Spartak	(Serbia) Vladimir Gaćinović	Resigned	14 February 2022	10th	(Serbia) Nebojša Vučković	14 February 2022
Novi Pazar	(Montenegro) Dragan Radojičić	Resigned	22 February 2022	15th	(Serbia) Tomislav Sivić	22 February 2022
Vojvodina	(Serbia) Slavoljub Đorđević	Sacked	14 March 2022	5th	(Montenegro) Dragan Radojičić	15 March 2022
Napredak	(Serbia) Ivan Stefanović	Sacked	22 March 2022	8th	(Serbia) Zoran Milinković	23 March 2022
Čukarički	(Serbia) Saša Ilić	Mutual termination	11 April 2022	3rd	(Serbia) Milan Lešnjak	12 April 2022

== Regular season ==
=== League table ===
Pos	Team	Pld	W	D	L	GF	GA	GD	Pts	Qualification
1	Red Star Belgrade	30	26	3	1	79	17	+62	81	Qualification for the Championship round
2	Partizan	30	25	4	1	68	10	+58	79	Qualification for the Championship round
3	Čukarički	30	14	12	4	48	27	+21	54	Qualification for the Championship round
4	TSC	30	11	8	11	44	41	+3	41	Qualification for the Championship round
5	Radnički Niš	30	9	13	8	32	33	−1	40	Qualification for the Championship round
6	Voždovac	30	11	7	12	41	37	+4	40	Qualification for the Championship round
7	Vojvodina	30	11	6	13	38	40	−2	39	Qualification for the Championship round
8	Napredak Kruševac	30	10	7	13	31	36	−5	37	Qualification for the Championship round
9	Mladost Lučani	30	10	6	14	38	44	−6	36	Qualification for the Relegation round
10	Radnik Surdulica	30	8	12	10	24	31	−7	36	Qualification for the Relegation round
11	Spartak Subotica	30	9	7	14	35	49	−14	34	Qualification for the Relegation round
12	Kolubara	30	10	4	16	32	56	−24	34	Qualification for the Relegation round
13	Radnički 1923	30	8	6	16	27	50	−23	30	Qualification for the Relegation round
14	Proleter Novi Sad	30	8	5	17	23	49	−26	29	Qualification for the Relegation round
15	Metalac G.M.	30	7	6	17	36	52	−16	27	Qualification for the Relegation round
16	Novi Pazar	30	5	10	15	25	49	−24	25	Qualification for the Relegation round

Source: SuperLiga (in Serbian)
Rules for classification: 1) Points; 2) Head-to-head points; 3) Head-to-head goal difference; 4) Head-to-head goals scored; 5) Head-to-head away goals scored (if two teams tied); 6) Goal difference; 7) Goals scored; 8) Fair play ranking; 9) Draw.

=== Results ===
Home \ Away	ČUK	KOL	MET	MLA	NAP	NPZ	PAR	PNS	RKG	RNI	RSU	RSB	SPA	TSC	VOJ	VOŽ
Čukarički		5–0	2–1	1–0	3–0	1–1	0–0	6–1	2–0	0–0	1–1	1–2	2–1	1–1	1–1	2–1
Kolubara	3–1		0–1	2–2	1–0	3–0	0–4	2–1	0–0	2–3	1–1	1–7	1–2	2–1	1–0	1–0
Metalac G.M.	0–3	3–1		0–2	2–3	1–0	0–3	3–0	4–1	1–1	1–1	1–2	2–0	2–4	2–3	0–1
Mladost Lučani	0–0	3–1	3–3		3–2	3–0	0–2	2–1	0–1	2–0	0–2	1–5	1–2	2–0	0–2	2–4
Napredak Kruševac	1–2	3–0	1–0	2–1		1–1	0–1	1–1	1–0	1–1	1–0	0–2	1–0	2–2	2–0	1–3
Novi Pazar	2–2	1–2	2–0	0–0	1–0		1–4	2–0	0–1	2–1	1–1	0–4	0–1	1–1	1–1	0–0
Partizan	2–0	1–0	3–1	2–1	0–0	2–0		0–0	2–0	4–0	2–0	1–1	5–0	2–0	4–1	4–0
Proleter Novi Sad	1–1	0–1	1–0	2–3	1–0	2–2	0–4		1–1	2–0	0–2	1–2	0–3	1–0	0–1	1–0
Radnički 1923	0–3	0–2	1–0	1–2	1–2	2–1	1–3	0–1		0–0	0–1	0–3	3–2	0–3	3–2	1–0
Radnički Niš	1–1	1–0	1–1	2–0	4–2	1–1	0–2	0–1	2–1		3–0	1–5	0–0	1–2	1–0	1–0
Radnik Surdulica	0–0	1–1	0–0	0–2	0–0	2–0	1–2	0–1	0–0	1–1		2–1	1–2	2–1	0–2	1–3
Red Star Belgrade	3–0	3–0	3–1	1–0	1–0	5–0	2–0	3–0	4–1	1–0	1–1		3–0	3–1	0–0	1–0
Spartak Subotica	1–2	4–3	2–0	0–0	3–2	1–2	0–1	1–2	1–1	1–1	0–2	1–3		0–0	2–2	0–4
TSC	1–2	4–0	1–2	2–1	1–2	2–0	1–3	2–1	4–4	1–1	0–0	2–3	2–1		1–0	2–1
Vojvodina	1–2	2–1	2–2	3–1	1–0	2–1	0–2	2–1	3–1	1–1	0–1	1–2	2–3	0–1		2–0
Voždovac	1–1	2–0	5–2	1–1	0–0	3–2	0–3	2–1	1–2	0–0	4–0	0–3	1–1	1–1	3–1	

Source: SuperLiga (in Serbian)
Legend: Blue = home team win; Yellow = draw; Red = away team win.
For upcoming matches, an "a" indicates there is an article about the rivalry between the two participants.

== Play-offs ==
=== Championship round ===
The top eight teams advanced from the regular season. Teams played each other once.

==== League table ====
Pos	Team	Pld	W	D	L	GF	GA	GD	Pts	Qualification	RSB	PAR	ČUK	RNI	VOŽ	TSC	VOJ	NAP
1	Red Star Belgrade (C)	37	32	4	1	95	19	+76	100	Qualification for the Champions League third qualifying round		0–0	1–0	4–1	3–1			
2	Partizan	37	31	5	1	85	13	+72	98	Qualification to Europa League third qualifying round			3–1	2–0		4–1	2–1	
3	Čukarički	37	15	15	7	54	34	+20	60	Qualification to Europa Conference League second qualifying round				0–0	0–0	2–3		0–0
4	Radnički Niš	37	12	15	10	40	39	+1	51	Qualification to Europa Conference League second qualifying round					0–0	2–0	1–0	
5	Voždovac	37	13	10	14	48	45	+3	49			0–3					2–1	3–0
6	TSC	37	13	9	15	51	56	−5	48		0–4				1–1		0–2	2–0
7	Vojvodina	37	13	6	18	44	51	−7	45		0–3		0–3					2–0
8	Napredak Kruševac	37	10	8	19	31	51	−20	38		0–1	0–3		0–4				

Source: SuperLiga (in Serbian)
Legend: Blue = home team win; Yellow = draw; Red = away team win.
Rules for classification: 1) Points; 2) Points in regular season; 3) Head-to-head points in regular season; 4) Head-to-head goal difference in regular season; 5) Head-to-head goals scored in regular season; 6) Head-to-head away goals scored in regular season (if two teams tied); 7) Goal difference; 8) Goals scored; 9) Fair play ranking; 10) Drawing of lots.
(C) Champions

=== Relegation round ===
The bottom eight teams from the regular season play in the relegation round. Teams play each other once.

==== League table ====
Pos	Team	Pld	W	D	L	GF	GA	GD	Pts	Qualification or relegation	RSU	KOL	MLA	SPA	NPZ	RDK	MET	PNS
9	Radnik Surdulica	37	12	15	10	37	37	0	51			3–0		2–0		1–1	3–3	
10	Kolubara	37	14	4	19	42	65	−23	46				3–0		1–3		2–0	1–0
11	Mladost Lučani	37	12	9	16	46	52	−6	45		2–3			2–1		0–0		0–0
12	Spartak Subotica	37	12	8	17	45	60	−15	44			2–1			1–3	2–1		3–1
13	Novi Pazar	37	10	11	16	39	54	−15	41	Qualification for play-off	0–1		1–1			2–1		
14	Radnički 1923	37	9	8	20	34	60	−26	35	Qualification for play-off		1–2					1–2	2–1
15	Metalac G.M. (R)	37	8	9	20	42	65	−23	33	Relegation to Serbian First League			0–3	1–1	0–3			
16	Proleter Novi Sad (R)	37	8	8	21	25	57	−32	32	Relegation to Serbian First League	0–0				0–2		0–0	

Source: SuperLiga (in Serbian)
Legend: Blue = home team win; Yellow = draw; Red = away team win.
Rules for classification: 1) Points; 2) Points in regular season; 3) Head-to-head points in regular season; 4) Head-to-head goal difference in regular season; 5) Head-to-head goals scored in regular season; 6) Head-to-head away goals scored in regular season (if two teams tied); 7) Goal difference; 8) Goals scored; 9) Fair play ranking; 10) Drawing of lots.
(R) Relegated

== Relegations play-off ==
Two legged relegation play-off matches will be played between the teams placed 13th and 14th at the end of relegation round and the teams placed 3rd and 4th at the end of Serbian First League Promotion round.

=== First legs ===
25 May 2022	Železničar	1–3	Radnički 1923	Smederevo Stadium, Smederevo
17:00	Gigić 79' (pen.)	Report	Ubiparip 21', 29'; Piščević 61'

25 May 2022	IMT	1–3	Novi Pazar	Čukarički Stadium, Belgrade
19:00	Lučić 39'	Report	Čečarić 6'; Rubežić 45'; Nikčević 69'

=== Second legs ===
29 May 2022	Radnički 1923	0–1 (3–2 agg.)	Železničar	Čika Dača Stadium, Kragujevac
16:00		Report	Grgić 26'

29 May 2022	Novi Pazar	0–2 (3(a)–3 agg.)	IMT	Novi Pazar City Stadium, Novi Pazar
18:30		Report	Luković 50'; Zorić 90'

== Individual statistics ==
=== Top scorers ===
As of matches played on 22 May 2022.

Pos	Scorer	Teams	Goals
1	(Cape Verde) Ricardo Gomes	Partizan	29
2	(Serbia) Aleksandar Katai	Red Star	24
3	(Montenegro) Mirko Ivanić	Red Star	17
4	(Comoros) Ben	Red Star	13
4	(Montenegro) Uroš Đuranović	Kolubara	13

=== Hat-tricks ===
Player	For	Against	Result	Date
(Serbia) Aleksandar Katai	Red Star	Mladost Lučani	5–1	21 November 2021
(Serbia) Aleksandar Katai	Red Star	Novi Pazar	5–0	6 March 2022
(Serbia) Aleksandar Katai	Red Star	Radnički Niš	5–1	2 April 2022
(Montenegro) Mirko Ivanić	Red Star	TSC	4–0	20 April 2022

=== Player of the week ===
As of matches played on 22 May 2022.

Round	Player	Club	Goals	Assist	Ref.
1	(Serbia) Đorđe Jovanović	Napredak	2	1	
2	(Israel) Bibras Natkho	Partizan	2	0	
3	(Serbia) Mihajlo Banjac	TSC	0	2	
4	(Montenegro) Uroš Đuranović	Kolubara	2	0	
5	(Serbia) Saša Marjanović	Napredak	1	1	
6	(Serbia) Srđan Hrstić	Spartak	2	0	
7	(Cape Verde) Ricardo Gomes	Partizan	2	2	
8	(Serbia) Aleksandar Katai	Red Star	2	0	
9	(Serbia) Saša Jovanović	Mladost	1	2	
10	(Serbia) Ivan Obradović	Partizan	1	1	
11	(Netherlands) Queensy Menig	Partizan	1	2	
12	(Serbia) Ivan Milosavljević	Voždovac	0	3	
13	(Serbia) Milan Rodić	Red Star	0	2	
14	(Serbia) Nikola Terzić	Partizan	2	0	
15	(Serbia) Miljan Škrbić	Radnički Niš	2	0	
16	(Serbia) Nikola Petrić	Proleter	0	0	
17	(Serbia) Aleksandar Katai ^{(2)}	Red Star	3	1	
18	(Comoros) El Fardou Ben	Red Star	2	1	
19	(Serbia) Aleksandar Stanisavljević	Voždovac	0	2	
20	(Montenegro) Uroš Đuranović ^{(2)}	Kolubara	2	0	
21	(Serbia) Milan Pavkov	Red Star	2	0	
22	(Montenegro) Janko Tumbasević	Mladost	2	0	
23	(Serbia) Miloš Đokić	Kolubara	0	2	
24	(Serbia) Saša Marjanović ^{(2)}	Napredak	1	1	
25	(Montenegro) Marko Rakonjac	Čukarički	1	2	
26	(Serbia) Aleksandar Katai ^{(3)}	Red Star	3	1	
27	(Serbia) Siniša Babić	Radnik Surdulica	1	1	
28	(Serbia) Stefan Vukić	TSC	2	0	
29	(Serbia) Aleksandar Katai ^{(4)}	Red Star	3	1	
30	(Serbia) Saša Marjanović ^{(3)}	Napredak	1	0	
31	(Serbia) Miloš Filipović	Kolubara	2	0	
32	(Montenegro) Mirko Ivanić	Red Star	3	0	
33	(Serbia) Nemanja Nikolić	Spartak	2	1	
34	(Serbia) Aleksandar Katai ^{(5)}	Red Star	2	1	
35	(Serbia) Miloš Spasić	Radnik	2	0	
36	(Cape Verde) Ricardo Gomes ^{(2)}	Partizan	2	0	
37	(Serbia) Nikola Jojić	Mladost	2	0	
