= 2021–22 in Serbian football =

Football in Serbia
- Season: 2021–22

The 2021–22 Serbian football will be the 16th season of the Serbian football since its establishment in 2006.

== Men's football ==
=== SuperLiga ===
Pos	Team	Pld	W	D	L	GF	GA	GD	Pts	Qualification
1	Red Star Belgrade	30	26	3	1	79	17	+62	81	Qualification for the Championship round
2	Partizan	30	25	4	1	68	10	+58	79	Qualification for the Championship round
3	Čukarički	30	14	12	4	48	27	+21	54	Qualification for the Championship round
4	TSC	30	11	8	11	44	41	+3	41	Qualification for the Championship round
5	Radnički Niš	30	9	13	8	32	33	−1	40	Qualification for the Championship round
6	Voždovac	30	11	7	12	41	37	+4	40	Qualification for the Championship round
7	Vojvodina	30	11	6	13	38	40	−2	39	Qualification for the Championship round
8	Napredak Kruševac	30	10	7	13	31	36	−5	37	Qualification for the Championship round
9	Mladost Lučani	30	10	6	14	38	44	−6	36	Qualification for the Relegation round
10	Radnik Surdulica	30	8	12	10	24	31	−7	36	Qualification for the Relegation round
11	Spartak Subotica	30	9	7	14	35	49	−14	34	Qualification for the Relegation round
12	Kolubara	30	10	4	16	32	56	−24	34	Qualification for the Relegation round
13	Radnički 1923	30	8	6	16	27	50	−23	30	Qualification for the Relegation round
14	Proleter Novi Sad	30	8	5	17	23	49	−26	29	Qualification for the Relegation round
15	Metalac G.M.	30	7	6	17	36	52	−16	27	Qualification for the Relegation round
16	Novi Pazar	30	5	10	15	25	49	−24	25	Qualification for the Relegation round

Source: SuperLiga (in Serbian)
Rules for classification: 1) Points; 2) Head-to-head points; 3) Head-to-head goal difference; 4) Head-to-head goals scored; 5) Head-to-head away goals scored (if two teams tied); 6) Goal difference; 7) Goals scored; 8) Fair play ranking; 9) Draw.

Pos	Team	Pld	W	D	L	GF	GA	GD	Pts	Qualification	RSB	PAR	ČUK	RNI	VOŽ	TSC	VOJ	NAP
1	Red Star Belgrade (C)	37	32	4	1	95	19	+76	100	Qualification for the Champions League third qualifying round		0–0	1–0	4–1	3–1			
2	Partizan	37	31	5	1	85	13	+72	98	Qualification to Europa League third qualifying round			3–1	2–0		4–1	2–1	
3	Čukarički	37	15	15	7	54	34	+20	60	Qualification to Europa Conference League second qualifying round				0–0	0–0	2–3		0–0
4	Radnički Niš	37	12	15	10	40	39	+1	51	Qualification to Europa Conference League second qualifying round					0–0	2–0	1–0	
5	Voždovac	37	13	10	14	48	45	+3	49			0–3					2–1	3–0
6	TSC	37	13	9	15	51	56	−5	48		0–4				1–1		0–2	2–0
7	Vojvodina	37	13	6	18	44	51	−7	45		0–3		0–3					2–0
8	Napredak Kruševac	37	10	8	19	31	51	−20	38		0–1	0–3		0–4				

Source: SuperLiga (in Serbian)
Rules for classification: 1) Points; 2) Points in regular season; 3) Head-to-head points in regular season; 4) Head-to-head goal difference in regular season; 5) Head-to-head goals scored in regular season; 6) Head-to-head away goals scored in regular season (if two teams tied); 7) Goal difference; 8) Goals scored; 9) Fair play ranking; 10) Drawing of lots.
(C) Champions

Pos	Team	Pld	W	D	L	GF	GA	GD	Pts	Qualification or relegation	RSU	KOL	MLA	SPA	NPZ	RDK	MET	PNS
9	Radnik Surdulica	37	12	15	10	37	37	0	51			3–0		2–0		1–1	3–3	
10	Kolubara	37	14	4	19	42	65	−23	46				3–0		1–3		2–0	1–0
11	Mladost Lučani	37	12	9	16	46	52	−6	45		2–3			2–1		0–0		0–0
12	Spartak Subotica	37	12	8	17	45	60	−15	44			2–1			1–3	2–1		3–1
13	Novi Pazar	37	10	11	16	39	54	−15	41	Qualification for play-off	0–1		1–1			2–1		
14	Radnički 1923	37	9	8	20	34	60	−26	35	Qualification for play-off		1–2					1–2	2–1
15	Metalac G.M. (R)	37	8	9	20	42	65	−23	33	Relegation to Serbian First League			0–3	1–1	0–3			
16	Proleter Novi Sad (R)	37	8	8	21	25	57	−32	32	Relegation to Serbian First League	0–0				0–2		0–0	

Source: SuperLiga (in Serbian)
Rules for classification: 1) Points; 2) Points in regular season; 3) Head-to-head points in regular season; 4) Head-to-head goal difference in regular season; 5) Head-to-head goals scored in regular season; 6) Head-to-head away goals scored in regular season (if two teams tied); 7) Goal difference; 8) Goals scored; 9) Fair play ranking; 10) Drawing of lots.
(R) Relegated

=== First League ===
Pos	Team	Pld	W	D	L	GF	GA	GD	Pts	Qualification
1	Inđija	30	17	7	6	48	29	+19	58	Qualification for the Championship round
2	Mladost GAT	30	16	9	5	35	17	+18	57	Qualification for the Championship round
3	Javor Matis	30	15	11	4	46	22	+24	56	Qualification for the Championship round
4	Železničar	30	15	7	8	42	31	+11	52	Qualification for the Championship round
5	IMT	30	13	10	7	49	30	+19	49	Qualification for the Championship round
6	Radnički	30	13	7	10	39	29	+10	46	Qualification for the Championship round
7	OFK Žarkovo	30	12	6	12	35	32	+3	42	Qualification for the Championship round
8	Loznica	30	11	8	11	29	26	+3	41	Qualification for the Championship round
9	Mačva	30	10	9	11	26	37	−11	39	Qualification for the Relegation round
10	Grafičar	30	10	5	15	44	43	+1	35	Qualification for the Relegation round
11	Rad	30	9	8	13	28	34	−6	35	Qualification for the Relegation round
12	Budućnost	30	9	8	13	30	41	−11	35	Qualification for the Relegation round
13	Zlatibor	30	8	10	12	28	35	−7	34	Qualification for the Relegation round
14	Timok 1919	30	9	6	15	29	35	−6	33	Qualification for the Relegation round
15	OFK Bačka	30	6	15	9	22	30	−8	33	Qualification for the Relegation round
16	Kabel	30	1	6	23	12	71	−59	9	Qualification for the Relegation round

Source: First league (in Serbian)
Rules for classification: 1) Points; 2) Head-to-head points; 3) Head-to-head goal difference; 4) Head-to-head goals scored; 5) Head-to-head away goals scored (if two teams tied); 6) Goal difference; 7) Goals scored; 8) Fair play ranking; 9) Draw.

Pos	Team	Pld	W	D	L	GF	GA	GD	Pts	Qualification
1	Mladost GAT (C, P)	37	21	9	7	48	24	+24	72	Promotion to the Serbian SuperLiga
2	Javor Matis (P)	37	19	12	6	57	30	+27	69	Promotion to the Serbian SuperLiga
3	Železničar	37	20	8	9	54	36	+18	68	Qualification for play-off
4	IMT	37	19	10	8	69	37	+32	67	Qualification for play-off
5	Inđija	37	19	7	11	55	38	+17	64	
6	Žarkovo (Note: OFK Žarkovo were relegated due to financial issues.) (R)	37	14	7	16	40	41	−1	49	Relegation to Serbian League
7	Radnički	37	13	9	15	42	45	−3	48	
8	Loznica	37	12	9	16	31	38	−7	45	

Source: First league (in Serbian)
Rules for classification: 1) Points; 2) Points in regular season; 3) Head-to-head points in regular season; 4) Head-to-head goal difference in regular season; 5) Head-to-head goals scored in regular season; 6) Head-to-head away goals scored in regular season (if two teams tied); 7) Goal difference; 8) Goals scored; 9) Fair play ranking; 10) Drawing of lots.
(C) Champions; (P) Promoted; (R) Relegated
Notes:

Pos	Team	Pld	W	D	L	GF	GA	GD	Pts	
9	Grafičar	37	15	6	16	62	48	+14	51	
10	Mačva	37	12	12	13	33	45	−12	48	
11	Rad	37	13	9	15	40	41	−1	48	
12	Zlatibor	37	12	11	14	38	44	−6	47	
13	Budućnost (R)	37	11	12	14	40	49	−9	45	Relegation to Serbian League
14	Timok 1919 (R)	37	11	7	19	38	44	−6	40	Relegation to Serbian League
15	OFK Bačka (R)	37	8	15	14	30	43	−13	39	Relegation to Serbian League
16	Kabel (R)	37	2	7	28	15	89	−74	13	Relegation to Serbian League

Source: First league (in Serbian)
Rules for classification: 1) Points; 2) Points in regular season; 3) Head-to-head points in regular season; 4) Head-to-head goal difference in regular season; 5) Head-to-head goals scored in regular season; 6) Head-to-head away goals scored in regular season (if two teams tied); 7) Goal difference; 8) Goals scored; 9) Fair play ranking; 10) Drawing of lots.
(R) Relegated

== UEFA competitions ==
Pos	Team	Pld	W	D	L	GF	GA	GD	Pts	Qualification	RSB	BRA	MID	LUD
1	(Serbia) Red Star Belgrade	6	3	2	1	6	4	+2	11	Advance to round of 16	—	2–1	0–1	1–0
2	(Portugal) Braga	6	3	1	2	12	9	+3	10	Advance to knockout round play-offs	1–1	—	3–1	4–2
3	(Denmark) Midtjylland	6	2	3	1	7	7	0	9	Transfer to Europa Conference League	1–1	3–2	—	1–1
4	(Bulgaria) Ludogorets Razgrad	6	0	2	4	3	8	−5	2		0–1	0–1	0–0	—

Source: UEFA
Rules for classification: Group stage tiebreakers

Round of 16

Team 1	Agg.	Team 2	1st leg	2nd leg
Rangers (Scotland)	4–2	(Serbia) Red Star Belgrade	3–0	1–2

Pos	Team	Pld	W	D	L	GF	GA	GD	Pts	Qualification	GNT	PAR	ANO	FLO
1	(Belgium) Gent	6	4	1	1	6	2	+4	13	Advance to round of 16	—	1–1	2–0	1–0
2	(Serbia) Partizan	6	2	2	2	6	4	+2	8	Advance to knockout round play-offs	0–1	—	1–1	2–0
3	(Cyprus) Anorthosis Famagusta	6	1	3	2	6	9	−3	6		1–0	0–2	—	2–2
4	(Estonia) Flora	6	1	2	3	5	8	−3	5		0–1	1–0	2–2	—

Source: UEFA
Rules for classification: Group stage tiebreakers

Knockout of play-offs

Round of 16

Team 1	Agg.	Team 2	1st leg	2nd leg
Sparta Prague (Czech Republic)	1–3	(Serbia) Partizan	0–1	1–2

Team 1	Agg.	Team 2	1st leg	2nd leg
Partizan (Serbia)	3–8	(Netherlands) Feyenoord	2–5	1–3
