= Thomas Vasov =

Serbian-German footballer and manager

Personal information
- Date of birth: 31 January 1972 (age 54)
- Place of birth: Trier, West Germany
- Height: 1.87 m (6 ft 1 1/2 in)
- Positions: Centre-back; defensive midfielder; sweeper

Team information
- Current team: Timok (manager)

Senior career*
Years	Team	Apps	(Gls)
–1993	Timok		
1993–1996	Borac Čačak		
1996–2003	Gent	111	(10)
2003	Shanghai Shenhua	17	(1)

Managerial career
- 2016: Borac Čačak (ass't)
- 2016: Borac Čačak
- 2016: Borac Čačak (ass't)
- 2016–201x: Mladost Lučani (youth)
- 2020: Trepča
- 2021: Borac Čačak
- 2021: Timok
- * Club domestic league appearances and goals

Thomas Vasov (born 31 January 1972) is a Serbian-German football manager, and former player until 2003. He most recently coached Timok.

== Club career ==
Born in Trier, West Germany, he was already playing in Serbia with FK Timok before his transfer to FK Borac Čačak in 1993. In his first season with Borac, they became champions of the 1993–94 Second League of FR Yugoslavia and got promotion to the First League of FR Yugoslavia where he played the following two seasons making 54 appearances and scoring 3 goals in the Yugoslav top-tier.

After three years with Borac, in summer 1996 he transferred to Belgium to K.A.A. Gent and played with them the following seven seasons in the Belgian Pro League.

In 2003, he transferred to Shanghai Shenhua and won the Chinese Jia-A League 2003. However, Shanghai Shenhua were stripped of the title on 19 February 2013 for the match-fixing scandal in that season.

== Coaching career ==
By Autumn 2014 he was working as coach of the youth team of FK Borac Čačak.

In April 2016, after Ljubiša Stamenković got sacked, Vasov took charge as main coach of FK Borac Čačak.

By January 2017, he was the director of all youth sections of FK Mladost Lučani.

In the 2019–20 season, and, at the start of the 2020–21 season, he was coach of FK Trepča.

== Honours ==
Borac Čačak

- Second League of FR Yugoslavia: 1993–94

Shanghai Shenhua

- Chinese Jia-A League: 2003
