= Škoro =

Škoro (Serbian pronunciation: [ʃkoro]), sometimes transliterated Shkoro or Skoro and spelled Шкоро in Serbian Cyrillic, is a Serbian/Bosnian/Croatian surname.

Notable people with this surname include:

- Alen Škoro (born 1981), Bosnian footballer
- Jovica Škoro (born 1947), Serbian footballer
- Haris Škoro (born 1962), Bosnian footballer
- Miroslav Škoro (born 1962), Croatian musician and politician
