= Ivan Stefanović =

Serbian football manager and player

Personal information
- Full name: Ivan Stefanović
- Date of birth: 9 August 1975 (age 51)
- Place of birth: Kruševac, SR Serbia, SFR Yugoslavia
- Height: 1.81 m (5 ft 11 in)
- Position: Striker

Youth career
- Napredak Kruševac

Senior career*
Years	Team	Apps	(Gls)
1995–1996	Župa Aleksandrovac		
1996–2000	Napredak Kruševac	71	(14)
2000–2001	Obilić		
2001–2002	St. Gallen	14	(0)
2004–2005	Napredak Kruševac	6	(0)

Managerial career
- 2012–2019: Napredak Kruševac (assistant)
- 2019–2020: Napredak Kruševac
- 2021: Mladost Lučani
- 2022: Napredak Kruševac
- 2024: Napredak Kruševac
- * Club domestic league appearances and goals

Ivan Stefanović (Serbian Cyrillic: Иван Стефановић; born 9 August 1975) is a Serbian football manager and former player.

== Playing career ==
Stefanović played for Napredak Kruševac and Obilić, before transferring abroad to Swiss club St. Gallen in March 2001.

== Managerial career ==
In the summer of 2012, Stefanović became an assistant to Napredak Kruševac manager Nenad Milovanović. He later assisted Nenad Lalatović, Vuk Rašović, and Milorad Kosanović, among others. In December 2019, after the departure of Predrag Rogan, Stefanović was put in temporary charge of the team and led them to victories over Partizan and Mačva Šabac, before being given the position on a permanent basis.

In June 2021, Stefanović was appointed as manager of Serbian SuperLiga club Mladost Lučani.
