= Uroš Đuranović =

Montenegrin footballer

Personal information
- Date of birth: 1 February 1994 (age 32)
- Place of birth: Budva, Montenegro, FR Yugoslavia
- Height: 1.84 m (6 ft 0 in)
- Positions: Attacking midfielder; forward

Team information
- Current team: Sliema Wanderers
- Number: 11

Youth career
- Mogren

Senior career*
Years	Team	Apps	(Gls)
2013–2014	Mogren	13	(0)
2014–2016	Iskra	31	(4)
2016–2017	Dečić	29	(4)
2017–2019	Dukla Prague	51	(9)
2019–2020	Korona Kielce	20	(0)
2019	Korona Kielce II	3	(1)
2020	Radnički Niš	12	(2)
2021	Politehnica Iași	15	(4)
2021–2022	Kolubara	34	(13)
2022–2023	Kecskemét	11	(1)
2023	Kolubara	15	(4)
2023–2024	Ħamrun Spartans	21	(11)
2024–2025	Novi Pazar	14	(5)
2025–2026	Arsenal Tula	16	(0)
2026–	Sliema Wanderers	10	(4)

International career
2010	Montenegro U17	3	(0)
2015–2016	Montenegro U21	2	(0)
2022	Montenegro	3	(0)
- * Club domestic league appearances and goals as of 18:39, 30 April 2026 (UTC)

Uroš Đuranović (Montenegrin Cyrillic: Урош Ђурановић; born 1 February 1994) is a Montenegrin professional footballer who plays as a forward for Maltese club Sliema Wanderers.

== International career ==
Đuranović made his debut for the Montenegro national team on 24 March 2022 in a friendly against Armenia.

== Honours ==
Iskra Danilovgrad

- 2. CFL: 2014–15

Ħamrun Spartans

- Maltese Premier League: 2023–24
- Maltese Super Cup: 2023

Individual

- Serbian SuperLiga Player of the Week: 2021–22 (Round 4, Round 20)
