= Vladimir Milosavljević =

Yugoslav and Serbian football manager and player

Personal information
- Full name: Vladimir Milosavljević
- Date of birth: 24 January 1947
- Place of birth: Blace, PR Serbia, FPR Yugoslavia
- Date of death: 14 August 2018 (aged 71)
- Place of death: Kruševac, Serbia
- Position: Goalkeeper

Senior career*
Years	Team	Apps	(Gls)
1965–1968	Priština	74	(0)
1968–1978	Napredak Kruševac	217	(0)
Total		291	(0)

International career
1971	Yugoslavia Olympic	2	(0)

Managerial career
- 1979: Napredak Kruševac
- 1987–1989: Napredak Kruševac
- 1993: Napredak Kruševac
- 1994: Radnički Niš
- 1995: Napredak Kruševac
- * Club domestic league appearances and goals

Vladimir Milosavljević (Serbian Cyrillic: Владимир Милосављевић; 24 January 1947 – 14 August 2018) was a Yugoslav and Serbian football manager and player.

== Club career ==
Born in Blace, Milosavljević initially played for Priština in the Yugoslav Second League, before joining Napredak Kruševac in 1968. He spent a decade with the club, helping them win promotion to the Yugoslav First League in 1976. In total, Milosavljević amassed 217 league appearances for the club, including 199 games in the Second League and 18 games in the First League.

== International career ==
At international level, Milosavljević played for the Yugoslavia Olympic team during its unsuccessful qualification campaign for the 1972 Summer Olympics.

== Managerial career ==
After hanging up his boots, Milosavljević was manager of Napredak Kruševac on numerous occasions, leading the club to promotion to the Yugoslav First League in 1988.

== Honours ==
=== Player ===
Napredak Kruševac

- Yugoslav Second League: 1975–76 (Group East), 1977–78 (Group East)

=== Manager ===
Napredak Kruševac

- Yugoslav Second League: 1987–88 (Group East)
