= Miloslav Radenović =

Serbian former football coach

Personal information
- Date of birth: 15 March 1944 (age 82)
- Place of birth: Serbia

Managerial career
- Years: Team
- 1997: Mladost Lučani
- Syria U20
- 2005–2006: Syria
- 2005: Syria U20

Miloslav Radenović (born 15 March 1944) is a Serbian retired football coach.

== Syria ==
At the helm of the Syria Under-20s for three years before, Radenovic was reinstated as coach of the team ahead of the 2005 FIFA World Youth Championship. The last time the Serbian coach worked with the Syrian Football Association before that was 2003. While managing the Syria national football team in 2005, Radenovic was involved in a situation where his team and the Oman national team they were countering showed up at different venues for the match.

He has mentored the Syria U16s as well.
