= Ljubiša Dmitrović =

Serbian football manager and player

Personal information
- Date of birth: 23 February 1969 (age 57)
- Place of birth: Čačak, SR Serbia, SFR Yugoslavia
- Position: Defender

Senior career*
Years	Team	Apps	(Gls)
1989–1991	Borac Čačak	41	(0)

Managerial career
- Borac Čačak (youth)
- Borac Čačak (assistant)
- 2008–2009: Borac Čačak
- 2009: Mladost Lučani
- 2011: Borac Čačak (assistant)
- 2011: Borac Čačak
- 2011–2012: Borac Čačak (assistant)
- 2012–2013: Mladost Lučani
- 2014: Sloboda Užice
- 2015: Jedinstvo Bijelo Polje
- 2016: Borac Čačak
- 2019: Takovo
- * Club domestic league appearances and goals

Ljubiša Dmitrović (Serbian Cyrillic: Љубиша Дмитровић; born 23 February 1969) is a Serbian football manager and former player.

== Managerial career ==
Dmitrović served three terms as manager of Borac Čačak (2008–2009, 2011 and 2016). He was also manager of Mladost Lučani on two occasions (2009 and 2012–2013) and Sloboda Užice (2014). In 2015, Dmitrović spent some time in charge of Montenegrin club Jedinstvo Bijelo Polje.
