= Mladen Dodić =

Serbian football manager and player

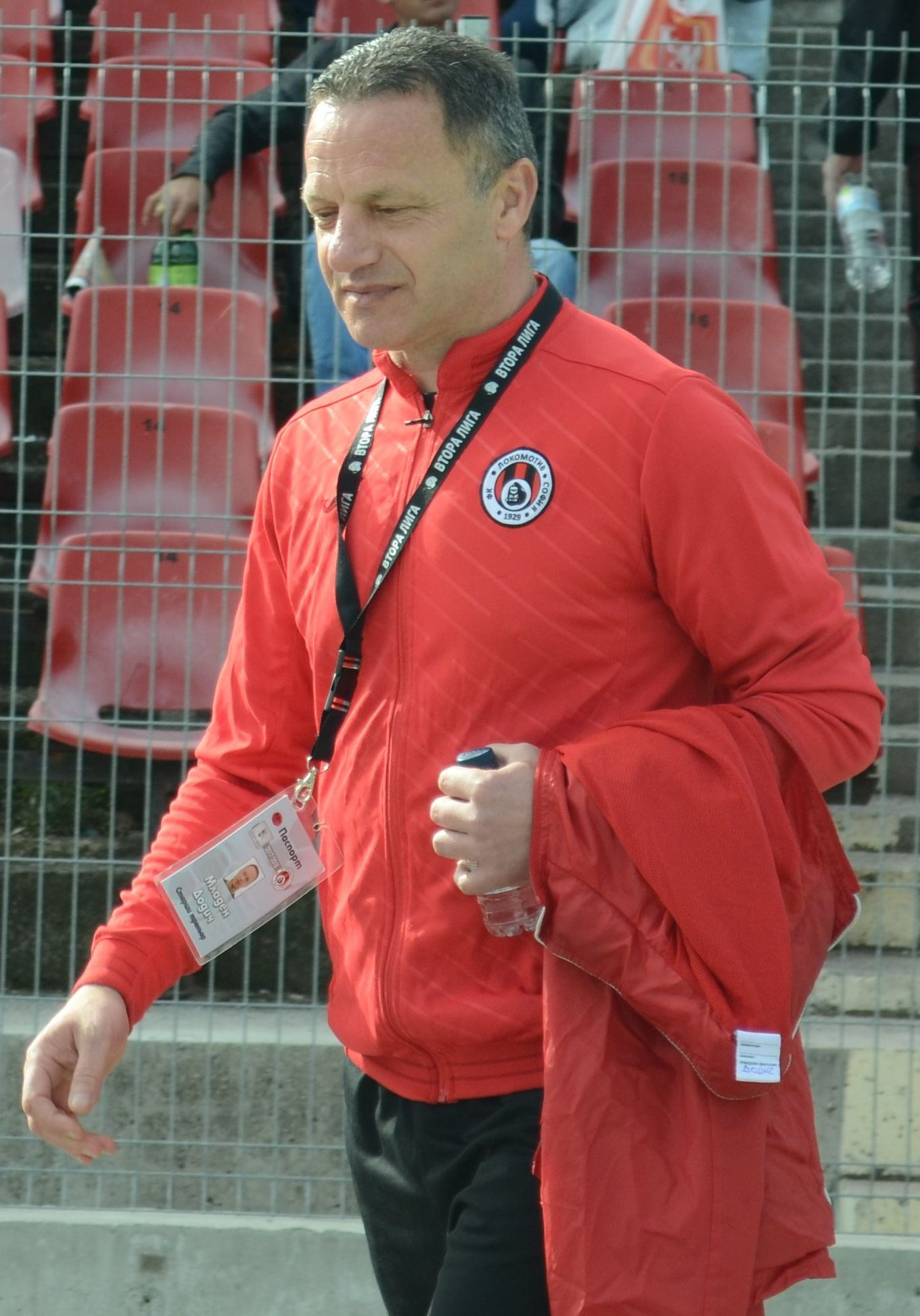
- Dodić with Lokomotiv Sofia in 2018

Personal information
- Date of birth: 17 October 1969 (age 57)
- Place of birth: Đakovica, SR Serbia, SFR Yugoslavia
- Position: Midfielder

Youth career
- Borac Bivolje

Senior career*
Years	Team	Apps	(Gls)
1990–1996	Napredak Kruševac	141	(17)
1996–1998	Železnik	51	(5)
1998–2001	Napredak Kruševac	40	(9)
2001	Pietà Hotspurs	1	(0)
Total		233	(31)

Managerial career
- 2003: Obilić (assistant)
- 2004–2005: Napredak Kruševac
- 2005–2007: Napredak Kruševac (assistant)
- 2007: Napredak Kruševac
- 2007–2008: Novi Pazar
- 2008–2009: Dinamo Vranje
- 2009–2010: Jagodina
- 2011: Novi Pazar
- 2011: Napredak Kruševac
- 2012–2013: Javor Ivanjica
- 2013–2014: Jagodina
- 2014–2015: Serbia U21
- 2015: Novi Pazar
- 2016: Javor Ivanjica
- 2016–2017: Borac Čačak
- 2017–2018: Lokomotiv Sofia
- 2018: Radnik Surdulica
- 2018–2019: Lokomotiv Sofia
- 2020–2021: PSS Sleman (assistant)
- 2022: Barito Putera (assistant)
- 2022–2023: Javor Ivanjica
- 2023: Napredak Kruševac (caretaker)
- 2025: Napredak Kruševac
- 2025: Mladost Lučani
- 2026: Bor
- * Club domestic league appearances and goals

Mladen Dodić (Serbian Cyrillic: Младен Додић; born 17 October 1969) is a Serbian football manager and former player.

== Playing career ==
After starting out at Borac Bivolje, Dodić joined Napredak Kruševac in 1990. He spent seven seasons with the club, before moving to Železnik in 1996. Two years later, Dodić returned to Napredak Kruševac. In September 2001, Dodić moved abroad and signed with Maltese side Pietà Hotspurs. He was released the next month, having played just one match for the club.

== Managerial career ==
After hanging up his boots, Dodić was manager of numerous Serbian SuperLiga and Serbian First League clubs, including Napredak Kruševac (four spells), Novi Pazar (three spells), Javor Ivanjica (three spells), Jagodina (two spells), Dinamo Vranje, Borac Čačak and Radnik Surdulica.

In December 2014, Dodić was appointed manager of the Serbia national under-21 team, succeeding Radovan Ćurčić, who took over the country's senior team the month prior.

== Career statistics ==
Appearances and goals by club, season and competition
Club	Season	League	
Club	Season	Apps	Goals
Napredak Kruševac	1989–90	17	3
Napredak Kruševac	1990–91	33	4
Napredak Kruševac	1991–92	22	3
Napredak Kruševac	1992–93	22	3
Napredak Kruševac	1993–94	14	1
Napredak Kruševac	1994–95	16	1
Napredak Kruševac	1995–96	17	2
Napredak Kruševac	Total	141	17
Železnik	1996–97	28	3
Železnik	1997–98	23	2
Železnik	Total	51	5
Napredak Kruševac	1998–99	19	5
Napredak Kruševac	1999–2000	14	3
Napredak Kruševac	2000–01	7	1
Napredak Kruševac	Total	40	9
Pietà Hotspurs	2001–02	1	0
Career total		233	31
