= Radovan Ćurčić =

Serbian football manager and player

Personal information
- Date of birth: 10 January 1972 (age 54)
- Place of birth: Ivanjica, SR Serbia, SFR Yugoslavia
- Height: 1.93 m (6 ft 4 in)
- Position: Striker

Team information
- Current team: Mladost Lučani (manager)

Youth career
- Javor Ivanjica
- Sloboda Užice

Senior career*
Years	Team	Apps	(Gls)
- Javor Ivanjica
1995	OFK Beograd	19	(3)
1996	Gorica	1	(0)
- Priština
- Javor Ivanjica
2000	Borac Čačak	6	(0)
- Javor Ivanjica

Managerial career
- 2003–2006: Javor Ivanjica
- 2006–2007: Borac Čačak
- 2007–2010: Javor Ivanjica
- 2010–2011: Serbia (assistant)
- 2011–2012: Serbia (caretaker)
- 2013–2014: Serbia U21
- 2014–2016: Serbia
- 2018: Muangthong United
- 2020: Partizan (assistant)
- 2021–2023: Javor Ivanjica (sporting director)
- 2023–2026: Javor Ivanjica
- 2026–: Mladost Lučani
- * Club domestic league appearances and goals

Radovan Ćurčić (Serbian Cyrillic: Радован Ћурчић; born 10 January 1972) is a Serbian football manager and former player. He is the current manager of Mladost Lučani.

== Playing career ==
Ćurčić started out at his hometown club Javor Ivanjica, before going on to play for OFK Beograd, Gorica (Slovenia), and Borac Čačak. He finished his career at his parent club Javor Ivanjica.

During his last spell with Javor Ivanjica, Ćurčić was the top scorer in the 2001–02 Second League of FR Yugoslavia (Group West) with 24 goals, thus leading the club to the First League. In the club's first season in the top flight since its foundation, Ćurčić scored five goals, but failed to save them from relegation.

== Managerial career ==
Immediately upon his retirement from playing in 2003, Ćurčić was named as new manager of Javor Ivanjica. He led the club to promotion to the First League of Serbia and Montenegro in 2005, but failed to avoid relegation. Subsequently, Ćurčić served as manager of Borac Čačak during the inaugural season of Serbia's elite division, before returning to Javor Ivanjica. He guided them to another promotion to the top flight in 2008, this time with an unbeaten record. In April 2010, Ćurčić briefly took charge of the Serbia national team by replacing Radomir Antić for a friendly away at Japan and won the game 3–0.

Between 2010 and 2011, Ćurčić served as an assistant to Vladimir Petrović while Petrović was manager of Serbia. He acted as caretaker manager of the national team from October 2011 until April 2012. In early 2013, Ćurčić took charge of the Serbia U21s and led the team to the 2015 UEFA Under-21 Championship. He was again named caretaker manager of the Serbia national team in November 2014, before being officially appointed as manager later the same month. On 27 April 2016, it was announced that Ćurčić left the position by mutual consent.

On 29 April 2018, Ćurčić was officially unveiled as the new manager of Thai club Muangthong United. He was dismissed from his post in October of the same year.

In June 2021, Ćurčić returned to Javor Ivanjica after 11 years, taking on the role of a sporting director. He was appointed as the club's manager in June 2023.

== Managerial statistics ==
As of 3 November 2026

Managerial record by team and tenure
Team	From	To	Record				
Team	From	To	P	W	D	L	Win %
Javor Matis	1 July 2003	30 June 2006	123	46	33	44	37.40
Borac Čačak	1 July 2006	31 December 2006	12	6	2	4	50.00
Javor Matis	1 January 2007	23 December 2010	101	38	47	16	37.62
Serbia	April 2010; October 2011; November 2014	April 2010; April 2012; April 2016	16	7	1	8	43.75
Muangthong United	April 2	October 2018	25	14	4	7	56.00
Javor Matis	July 2023	1 June 2026	141	53	41	47	37.59
Mladost Lučani	12 June 2026	Present	15	4	6	5	26.67
Total			439	168	135	136	38.27
