= Dragiša Žunić =

Serbian footballer

Personal information
- Full name: Dragiša Žunić
- Date of birth: 29 June 1978 (age 48)
- Place of birth: Požega, SFR Yugoslavia
- Height: 1.93 m (6 ft 4 in)
- Position: Defender

Youth career
- Sloga Požega

Senior career*
Years	Team	Apps	(Gls)
1996–2003	Mladost Lučani	85	(3)
2003	Vojvodina	0	(0)
2004–2006	Javor Ivanjica	72	(4)
2006–2008	Mladost Lučani	52	(6)
2008–2009	Jagodina	23	(0)
2009	Metalac Gornji Milanovac	7	(0)
2010–2011	Mladost Lučani	41	(3)
2011–2013	Jedinstvo Putevi	31	(7)
Total		311	(23)

Managerial career
- 2019: Sloga Požega
- 2022–2023: Mladost Lučani
- 2023: FAP
- 2024: Polet Ljubić
- 2026: Mladost Lučani
- * Club domestic league appearances and goals

Dragiša Žunić (Serbian Cyrillic: Драгиша Жунић; born 29 June 1978) is a Serbian former footballer who played as a defender.

== Honours ==
Mladost Lučani

- Serbian First League: 2006–07
