= 1987–88 Yugoslav Second League =

Yugoslav Second League
- Season: 1987–88
- Champions: Spartak Subotica (West Division); Napredak Kruševac (East Division)
- Promoted: Spartak Subotica; Napredak Kruševac
- Relegated: 18 teams

The 1987–88 Yugoslav Second League season was the 42nd season of the Second Federal League (Serbo-Croatian: Druga savezna liga), the second level association football competition of SFR Yugoslavia, since its establishment in 1946. The league was contested in two regional groups (West Division and East Division), with 18 clubs each. This was the last season under that format as the following season featured unified second league with 20 clubs.

== West Division ==
=== Teams ===
A total of eighteen teams contested the league, including twelve sides from the 1986–87 season, two clubs relegated from the 1985–86 Yugoslav First League and four sides promoted from the Inter-Republic Leagues played in the 1986–87 season. The league was contested in a double round robin format, with each club playing every other club twice, for a total of 34 rounds. Two points were awarded for wins and one point for draws.

Dinamo Vinkovci and Spartak Subotica were relegated from the 1986–87 Yugoslav First League after finishing in the bottom two places of the league table. The four clubs promoted to the second level were Borac Travnik, Kabel, Olimpija Ljubljana and Šparta Beli Manastir. At the end of season, Olimpija Ljubljana was spared from relegation as representative of Slovenia.

Locations of teams' home cities in the 1987–88 Yugoslav Second League West

Team	Location	Federal subject	Position in 1986–87
Borac Banja Luka	Banja Luka	SR Bosnia and Herzegovina	6th
Borac Travnik	Travnik	SR Bosnia and Herzegovina	—
Dinamo Vinkovci	Vinkovci	SR Croatia	—
GOŠK-Jug	Dubrovnik	SR Croatia	11th
Famos Hrasnica	Hrasnica	SR Bosnia and Herzegovina	5th
Iskra	Bugojno	SR Bosnia and Herzegovina	10th
Jedinstvo Brčko	Brčko	SR Bosnia and Herzegovina	9th
Kabel	Novi Sad	(Socialist Republic of Serbia) SAP Vojvodina	—
Kikinda	Kikinda	(Socialist Republic of Serbia) SAP Vojvodina	3rd
Leotar	Trebinje	SR Bosnia and Herzegovina	4th
Mladost Petrinja	Petrinja	SR Croatia	8th
Novi Sad	Novi Sad	(Socialist Republic of Serbia) SAP Vojvodina	2nd
Olimpija Ljubljana	Ljubljana	SR Slovenia	—
Proleter Zrenjanin	Zrenjanin	(Socialist Republic of Serbia) SAP Vojvodina	7th
Rudar Ljubija	Prijedor	SR Bosnia and Herzegovina	12th
Spartak Subotica	Subotica	(Socialist Republic of Serbia) SAP Vojvodina	—
Šibenik	Šibenik	SR Croatia	11th
Šparta Beli Manastir	Beli Manastir	SR Croatia	—

=== League table ===
Pos	Team	Pld	W	D	L	GF	GA	GD	Pts	Promotion, qualification or relegation
1	Spartak Subotica (C, P)	34	21	6	7	56	23	+33	48	Promotion to Yugoslav First League
2	GOŠK-Jug	34	17	10	7	45	33	+12	44	
3	Dinamo Vinkovci	34	18	7	9	61	38	+23	43	
4	Kikinda	34	17	6	11	53	39	+14	40	
5	Šibenik	34	17	4	13	43	32	+11	38	
6	Proleter Zrenjanin	34	15	7	12	46	36	+10	37	
7	Leotar	34	16	5	13	60	52	+8	37	
8	Borac Banja Luka	34	13	10	11	47	35	+12	36	Qualification for Cup Winners' Cup first round
9	Iskra (R)	34	15	6	13	48	43	+5	36	
10	Rudar Ljubija (R)	34	15	5	14	38	28	+10	35	Relegation to Inter-Republic Leagues
11	Šparta Beli Manastir (R)	34	14	6	14	44	50	−6	34	Relegation to Inter-Republic Leagues
12	Olimpija	34	12	8	14	43	42	+1	32	
13	Mladost Petrinja (R)	34	9	12	13	31	38	−7	30	Relegation to Inter-Republic Leagues
14	Novi Sad (R)	34	8	11	15	29	45	−16	27	Relegation to Inter-Republic Leagues
15	Famos Hrasnica (R)	34	9	8	17	37	50	−13	26	Relegation to Inter-Republic Leagues
16	Kabel (R)	34	9	8	17	41	56	−15	26	Relegation to Inter-Republic Leagues
17	Jedinstvo Brčko (R)	34	11	4	19	26	56	−30	26	Relegation to Inter-Republic Leagues
18	Borac Travnik (R)	34	6	5	23	30	82	−52	17	Relegation to Inter-Republic Leagues

Source: fsgzrenjanin.com
Rules for classification: 1) points; 2) goal difference; 3) number of goals scored.
(C) Champions; (P) Promoted; (R) Relegated

== East Division ==
=== Teams ===
A total of eighteen teams contested the league, including fourteen sides from the 1986–87 season and four sides promoted from the Inter-Republic Leagues played in the 1986–87 season. The league was contested in a double round robin format, with each club playing every other club twice, for a total of 34 rounds. Two points were awarded for wins and one point for draws.

There were no teams relegated from the 1986–87 Yugoslav First League. The four clubs promoted to the second level were Liria, Mačva Šabac, Metalurg Skopje and OFK Titograd.

Locations of teams' home cities in the 1987–88 Yugoslav Second League East

Team	Location	Federal subject	Position in 1986–87
OFK Belgrade	Belgrade	SR Serbia	2nd
Borac Čačak	Čačak	SR Serbia	9th
Ivangrad	Ivangrad	SR Montenegro	11th
Liria	Prizren	(Socialist Republic of Serbia) SAP Kosovo	—
Mačva Šabac	Šabac	SR Serbia	—
Majdanpek	Majdanpek	SR Serbia	5th
Metalurg Skopje	Skopje	SR Macedonia	—
Napredak Kruševac	Kruševac	SR Serbia	15th
Novi Pazar	Novi Pazar	SR Serbia	3rd
Pelister	Bitola	SR Macedonia	4th
Pobeda	Prilep	SR Macedonia	13th
Radnički Kragujevac	Kragujevac	SR Serbia	12th
Radnički Pirot	Pirot	SR Serbia	6th
Crvena Zvezda Gnjilane	Gnjilane	(Socialist Republic of Serbia) SAP Kosovo	14th
Sloboda Titovo Užice	Titovo Užice	SR Serbia	7th
Teteks	Tetovo	SR Macedonia	8th
OFK Titograd	Titograd	SR Montenegro	—
Vlaznimi Đakovica	Đakovica	(Socialist Republic of Serbia) SAP Kosovo	10th

=== League table ===
Pos	Team	Pld	W	D	L	GF	GA	GD	Pts	Promotion or relegation
1	Napredak Kruševac (C, P)	34	15	13	6	47	25	+22	43	Promotion to Yugoslav First League
2	OFK Belgrade	34	17	6	11	49	24	+25	40	
3	Pelister	34	16	7	11	36	30	+6	39	
4	Radnički Kragujevac	34	17	4	13	51	38	+13	38	
5	Liria	34	18	2	14	42	42	0	38	
6	Novi Pazar	34	15	8	11	39	42	−3	38	
7	Mačva Šabac	34	16	5	13	45	32	+13	37	
8	Sloboda Titovo Užice	34	14	9	11	41	30	+11	37	
9	Borac Čačak	34	14	9	11	44	36	+8	37	
10	Pobeda (R)	34	15	6	13	40	32	+8	36	Relegation to Inter-Republic Leagues
11	Teteks (R)	34	11	10	13	36	37	−1	32	Relegation to Inter-Republic Leagues
12	Radnički Pirot (R)	34	13	6	15	47	52	−5	32	Relegation to Inter-Republic Leagues
13	Ivangrad (R)	34	10	10	14	25	31	−6	30	Relegation to Inter-Republic Leagues
14	Metalurg (R)	34	9	10	15	36	45	−9	28	Relegation to Inter-Republic Leagues
15	Crvena Zvezda Gnjilane (R)	34	9	10	15	25	41	−16	28	Relegation to Inter-Republic Leagues
16	OFK Titograd (R)	34	12	4	18	37	54	−17	28	Relegation to Inter-Republic Leagues
17	Vlaznimi Đakovica (R)	34	10	7	17	23	48	−25	27	Relegation to Inter-Republic Leagues
18	Majdanpek (R)	34	10	4	20	28	52	−24	24	Relegation to Inter-Republic Leagues

Source: fsgzrenjanin.com
Rules for classification: 1) points; 2) goal difference; 3) number of goals scored.
(C) Champions; (P) Promoted; (R) Relegated

== See also ==
- 1987–88 Yugoslav First League
- 1987–88 Yugoslav Cup
