= FK Borac 1926 =

Borac 1926
- Full name: Fudbalski Klub Borac 1926
- Nickname: Zebre (The Zebras)
- Founded: 1 May 1926; 100 years ago as (FK Borac) July 17, 2019; 7 years ago as (FK Borac 1926)
- Ground: Čačak Stadium
- Capacity: 6,574
- President: Predrag Milivojević
- Manager: Nemanja Krtolica
- League: Serbian First League
- 2024–25: Serbian First League, 8th of 16
- Website: fkborac1926.com
Home colours	Away colours

Fudbalski klub Borac 1926 (Serbian Cyrillic: Фудбалски клуб Борац 1926), commonly known as Borac Čačak, is a professional football club based in Čačak, Serbia. The home ground is Čačak Stadium, which has seating capacity of 8,000. As of 2024–25 season, the club competes in second tier Serbian First League.

The word Borac in translation means fighter in English. Mainly because of the horizontal stripes, Borac's nickname is "Zebras".

== History ==
At the end of World War I, football began to be played in Čačak. According to some sources the first football match took place in 1920. Six years later, a group of union workers who organized on 1 May 1926 founded the club. Initially, the uniform was red and later was changed to red-and-white. The first president of the club was a carpenter, Jovan Jolović. On 6 August 1932, FK Borac had its first night match under stadium floodlights, with the Arsenal football club. Before World War II the club's biggest success was winning 1st place in the West Morava district league in 1934.

After a break during World War II, the club started up again and in 1946 played in the qualifications for the Yugoslav First League against Red Star Belgrade but lost. Its next achievement was to win the Serbian Cup in 1958 (regional Yugoslav Cup back then) and four years later won promotion to the Yugoslav Second League. The first play-off match against OFK Titograd was lost 1–3, but in the home match on 15 July 1962, with six goals in the second half, FK Borac secured a promotion to the Second Federal League.

For many years Borac played in the Second Federal League but the dream of the promotion to the top-tier competition came through in 1994 when Borac got promoted to the First League of FR Yugoslavia. Previously Borac had failed in three attempts to make it to the top flight, losing play-off matches in 1970, 1971, and 1973. The club has been relegated three times since first making the Yugoslav First League but they have also three times managed to win promotion back to the top league, last time in 2003. In the 2005–06 season, Borac finished in 7th place, the club's highest finish at the time.

=== 2006–present ===
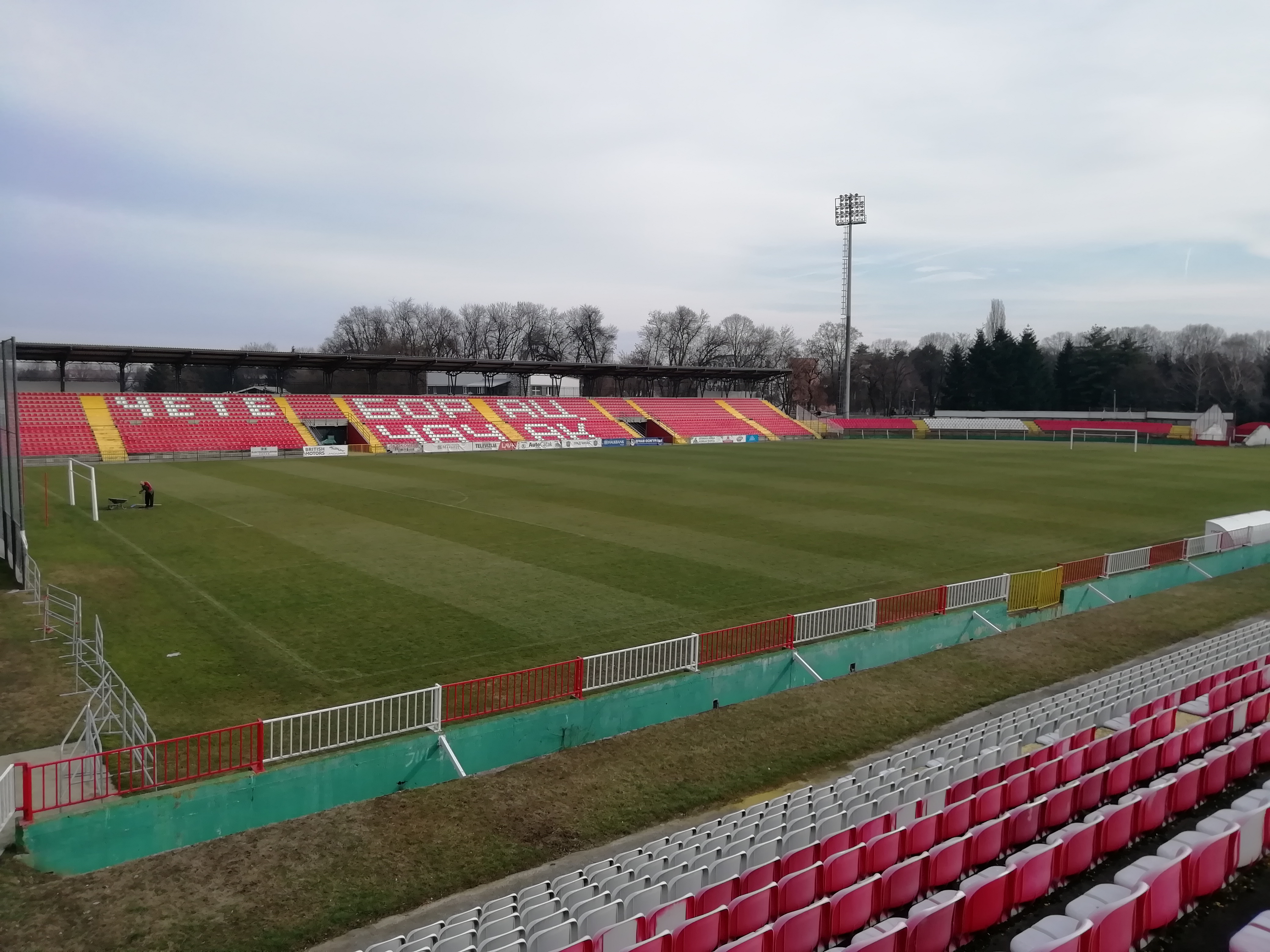
Čačak Stadium, February 2019

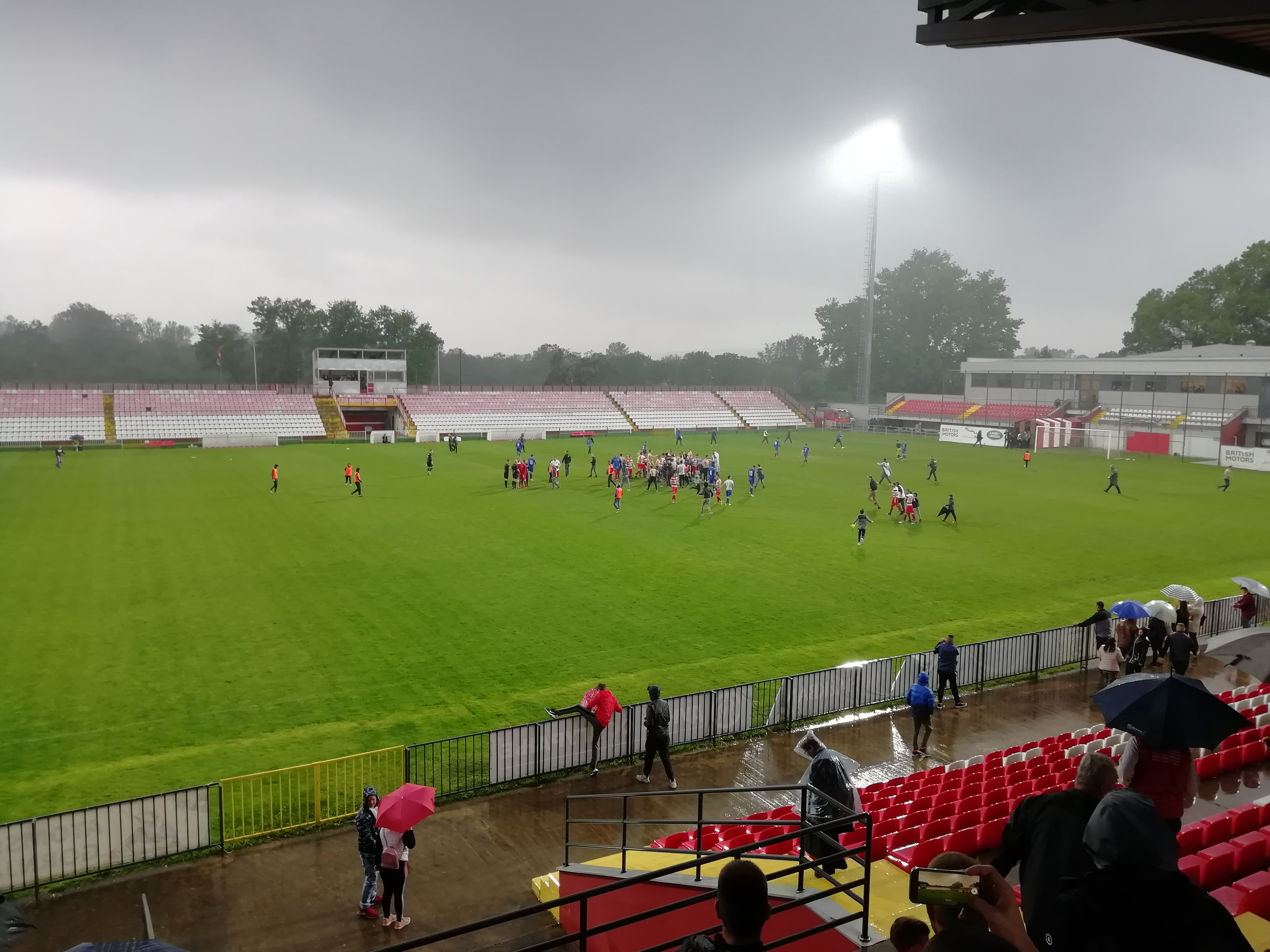
Celebration of relegation survival after last round win of Serbian First League, May 2019

In 2006, Serbian SuperLiga was established as top-tier competition in Serbia following the Montenegrin independence from state union. Borac Čačak finished the 2007–08 in 4th place, thereby securing a place in European competition for the first time. In the 2008–09 UEFA Cup, Borac defeated Dacia Chișinău from Moldova 4–2 on aggregate in the first qualifying round, and Lokomotiv Sofia from Bulgaria 2–1 on aggregate in the second qualifying round. However, Dutch giants Ajax denied Borac entry into the group stage by defeating them twice, 1–4 in Belgrade and 0–2 in Amsterdam.

In 2011–12 Serbian SuperLiga, Borac Čačak finished in 15th place and were relegated to the Serbian First League. After mediocre performance in 2012–13 Serbian First League, Borac finished in second place of 2013–14 Serbian First League as runners-up over Metalac Gornji Milanovac, with whom they were tied on points and promoted to the top-tier competition. On 2 August 2014, Borac for the second time in their history played a night match under floodlights, defeating Metalac 1–0 at the reconstructed Čačak stadium.

Borac Čačak finished in 16th place of 2017–18 Serbian SuperLiga and were relegated once again to the Serbian First League. In 2018–19 Serbian First League, Borac had yet another turbulent season, barely escaping the relegation zone in the last round of the competition, following the win over Novi Pazar and Bečej's loss to Trajal. In July 2019, the club was expelled from the Serbian First League due to 1.7 million euros debt in taxes and around 270,000 euros in debts to its former players.

== Recent league history ==
Season	Division	P	W	D	L	F	A	Pts	Pos
2020–21	Serbian First League	34	11	9	14	38	37	36	14th
2021–22	Serbian League West	30	16	4	10	42	30	52	4th
2022–23	Serbian League West	30	24	4	2	74	24	76	2nd
2023–24	Serbian League West	30	23	5	2	69	18	74	1st
2024–25	Serbian First League	30	12	9	9	39	35	45	6th

== Honours ==
- Serbian Cup
  - Runners-up (1): 2011–12
- Second League FRY/SCG
  - Champions (3): 1993–94, 1998–99, 2002–03 (Group West)

== UEFA competitions ==
- Qualified for Europe in 1 season

Season	Competition	Round	Country	Club	Home	Away	Aggregate
2008–09	UEFA Cup	QR1	(Moldova)	Dacia Chișinău	3–1	1–1	4–2
2008–09	UEFA Cup	QR2	(Bulgaria)	Lokomotiv Sofia	1–0	1–1	2–1
2008–09	UEFA Cup	R1	(Netherlands)	Ajax	1–4	0–2	1–6

== Kit manufacturers and shirt sponsors ==
Period	Kit Manufacturer	Shirt Sponsor
2008–present	NAAI	Škoda

=== First-team squad ===
As of 22 August 2026

Note: Flags indicate national team as defined under FIFA eligibility rules; some limited exceptions apply. Players may hold more than one non-FIFA nationality.

No.	Pos.	Nation	Player
1	GK	SRB	Dobrivoje Rozgić
2	DF	BIH	Luka Janković
3	DF	SRB	Milan Kolarević
4	MF	SRB	Aleksandar Desančić
5	DF	SRB	Viktor Živadinović (on loan from Radnički 1923)
6	MF	NGR	Ibrahim Yusuf (on loan from Radnički 1923)
7	MF	SRB	Branislav Tomić
8	MF	SRB	Lazar Majstorović
9	FW	SRB	Uroš Kilibarda
10	FW	SRB	Milan Jevtović (captain)
11	FW	SRB	Stefan Đurić
12	DF	BRA	Leandro Pinto
13	MF	SRB	Andrija Čaluković
14	DF	SRB	Petar Milutinović (on loan from Radnički 1923)
15	DF	BIH	Nenad Nikić
16	MF	NGR	Ibrahim Adamu

No.	Pos.	Nation	Player
17	MF	SRB	Vasilije Đerković
18	MF	SRB	Aleksandar Ljujić
19	DF	SRB	Predrag Popadić
20	FW	SRB	Mihajlo Spasojević
21	MF	SRB	Veljko Ilić (on loan from Grafičar)
22	FW	SRB	Ognjen Alempijević (dual registration with Mladost Lučani)
23	FW	MNE	Pavle Roćenović
24	MF	CIV	Issiaka Dembele (on loan from OFK Beograd)
27	DF	SRB	Vuk Ostojić
28	DF	SRB	Nikola Tomović
29	MF	SRB	Miloš Vidović (vice-captain)
30	MF	SRB	Miloš Mijić
41	GK	SRB	Filip Stanić
75	GK	SRB	Janko Barać
91	GK	SRB	Nikola Petrić

=== Out on loan ===
Note: Flags indicate national team as defined under FIFA eligibility rules; some limited exceptions apply. Players may hold more than one non-FIFA nationality.

No.	Pos.	Nation	Player
—	FW	SRB	Janko Rakonjac (at Omladinac Zablaće until the end of the 2026–27 season)

=== Coaching staff ===
Position	Name
Head coach	(Serbia) Nemanja Krtolica
Assistant coach	(Serbia) Rašo Babić
Goalkeeping coach	(Serbia) Zoran Savić
Fitness coach	(Serbia) Marko Zoćević
Analyst coach	(Serbia) Siniša Kotorčević
Physiotherapist	(Serbia) Sanja Plazinić (Serbia) Dobrosav Melajac (Serbia) Nikola Melajac (Serbia) Nikola Gilović (Serbia) Mitar Popović
Doctor	(Serbia) Petar Spasojević (Serbia) Rade Ranitović
Security commissioner	(Serbia) Nebojša Ilić
Secretary of the coaching staff	(Serbia) Borko Radović
General secretary	(Serbia) Aleksandar Petrović

== Notable former players ==
Former players with senior national team appearances:

- (Socialist Federal Republic of Yugoslavia) Radojko Avramović
- (Serbia and Montenegro) Igor Bogdanović
- (Serbia and Montenegro) Boban Dmitrović
- (Serbia and Montenegro) Ljubiša Dunđerski
- (Serbia and Montenegro) Jovan Gojković
- (Serbia and Montenegro) Slobodan Marković
- (Serbia and Montenegro) Radovan Radaković
- (Serbia and Montenegro) Milivoje Vitakić
- (Serbia) Branimir Aleksić
- (Serbia) Ivica Dragutinović
- (Serbia) Radiša Ilić
- (Serbia) Aleksandar Jevtić
- (Serbia) Darko Lazović
- (Serbia) Marko Lomić
- (Serbia) Nemanja Milunović
- (Serbia) Filip Mladenović
- (Serbia) Miljan Mutavdžić
- (Serbia) Ivan Stevanović
- (Bosnia and Herzegovina) Mario Božić
- (Bosnia and Herzegovina) Rade Krunić
- (Chad) Misdongarde Betolngar
- (Guinea-Bissau) Bacar Baldé
- (Indonesia) Ilija Spasojević
- (Kazakhstan) Nenad Erić
- (Liberia) Omega Roberts
- (North Macedonia) Darko Krsteski
- (North Macedonia) Stefan Spirovski
- (Montenegro) Damir Čakar
- (Montenegro) Vladimir Gluščević
- (Montenegro) Milan Jovanović
- (Montenegro) Rade Petrović
- (Montenegro) Risto Radunović
- (Montenegro) Darko Zorić
- (Palestine) Javier Cohene
- (Sierra Leone) Mustapha Bangura
- (Uganda) Eugene Sseppuya
- (Zimbabwe) Mike Temwanjera

For the list of all current and former players with Wikipedia article, please see: Category:FK Borac Čačak players.

== Historical list of coaches ==
A great number of coaches have passed through the club. Before the World War II the main coach was the former BSK Belgrade and national team player Dragomir Tošić. After 1945 the main coaches were Ivan Stevović, Dragoslav Filipović, Prvoslav Dragićević, Kosta Tomašević, Živorad Stanković, Vasilije Šijaković, Gojko Zec, Dragan Bojović, Momčilo Ilić, Žarko Nedeljković, among others. More recently, the club was managed by Dušan Radonjić, Slobodan Ostojić, Mihailo Kolarević, Dušan Marić, Milovan Đorić, Milovan Ćirković, Dragutin Spasojević, Nenad Starovlah, Ivan Čančarević, Milorad Kosanović, Dimitrije Mitrović, Branko Smiljanić, Božidar Vuković, Slavenko Kuzeljević, Dušimir Vulović, Radovan Gudurić, Milutin Marušić, Miodrag Božović and Milovan Rajevac.

- (Socialist Federal Republic of Yugoslavia) Gojko Zec (1966-1968)
- (Socialist Federal Republic of Yugoslavia) Milovan Ćirković (–1990)
- (Socialist Federal Republic of Yugoslavia) Slobodan Ostojić (1990–)
- (Federal Republic of Yugoslavia) Milovan Đorić (–1993)
- (Federal Republic of Yugoslavia) Dragutin Spasojević (October 1993 – ?)
- (Bosnia and Herzegovina) Nenad Starovlah (? – 1994)
- (Federal Republic of Yugoslavia) Ivan Čančarević (1994–1995)
- (Federal Republic of Yugoslavia) Slavko Vojičić (1995 – September 1995)
- (Federal Republic of Yugoslavia) Milorad Kosanović (September 1995 – November 1995)
- (Federal Republic of Yugoslavia) Dimitrije Mitrović (1996)
- (Federal Republic of Yugoslavia) Mihailo Kolarević (1997)
- (Federal Republic of Yugoslavia) Branko Smiljanić (1998 – February 1998)
- (Federal Republic of Yugoslavia) Slobodan Dogandžić (February 1998 – 1998)
- (Federal Republic of Yugoslavia) Dušan Radonjić (1998 – ?)
- (Federal Republic of Yugoslavia) Branko Smiljanić (? – 1999)
- (Federal Republic of Yugoslavia) Slavenko Kuzeljević (1999–2000)
- (Federal Republic of Yugoslavia) Radovan Gudurić
- (Serbia and Montenegro) Miodrag Božović (23 September 2003 – 2004)
- (Serbia and Montenegro) Slavko Vojičić (2004-2005)
- (Serbia and Montenegro) Miodrag Božović (2005 – 2006)
- (Serbia) Radovan Ćurčić (2006 – 3 March 2007)
- (Montenegro) Miodrag Božović (8 March 2007 – 8 January 2008)
- (Serbia) Milovan Rajevac (17 January 2008 – 13 August 2008)
- (Serbia) Nenad Milovanović (14 August 2008 – 11 November 2008)
- (Serbia) Ljubiša Dmitrović (12 November 2008 – 2009)
- (Serbia) Žarko Đurović (2009)
- (Montenegro) Miodrag Martać (2009–10)
- (Serbia) Nenad Milovanović (2010)
- (Serbia) Slavko Petrović (10 January 2011 – 30 May 2011)
- (Serbia) Ljubiša Dmitrović (2011)
- (Serbia) Slavko Petrović (3 October 2011 – 26 March 2012)
- (Serbia) Slavko Vojičić (2012)
- (Serbia) Zoran Njeguš (2012-2013)
- (Serbia) Dejan Vukićević (2013)
- (Serbia) Bogić Bogićević (2013-2015)
- (Serbia) Nenad Lalatović (29 June 2015 – 10 November 2015)
- (Serbia) Milorad Kosanović (2015)
- (Serbia) Ljubiša Stamenković (2015 – April 2016)
- (Germany) Thomas Vasov (April 2016 – May 2016)
- (Serbia) Milorad Kosanović (2016)
- (Serbia) Ljubiša Dmitrović (May 2016 – August 2016)
- (Serbia) Mladen Dodić (2 Nov 2016- Apr 17)
- (Serbia) Vladimir Stanisavljević (Apr 2017) (caretaker)
- (Serbia) Milorad Kosanović (8 Apr 2017- Jun 17)
- (Serbia) Igor Spasić (26 Jun 2017-24 Feb 18)
- (Serbia) Miloš Đolović (2018) (caretaker)
- (Serbia) Vladimir Stanisavljević (6 Mar 2018-Dec 20)
- (Germany) Thomas Vasov (12 Jan 2021-Apr 21)
- (Serbia) Vladimir Stanisavljević (2021)
- (Serbia) Željko Kovačević (2021-22)
- (Serbia) Darko Rakočević (2022-21 Jun 25)
- (Serbia) Igor Bondžulić (1 Jul 2025-Oct 25)
- (Serbia) Zoran Kostić (27 Oct 2025-)
