= Mirko Jovanović =

Serbian football manager and player

Personal information
- Full name: Mirko Jovanović
- Date of birth: 14 March 1971 (age 55)
- Place of birth: Novi Sad, SR Serbia, SFR Yugoslavia
- Height: 1.80 m (5 ft 11 in)
- Position: Forward

Youth career
- Vojvodina

Senior career*
Years	Team	Apps	(Gls)
1989–1990	Mačva Šabac	19	(0)
1992–1993	Spartak Subotica	11	(1)
1993–1995	1. FC Košice	21	(3)
1995–1998	Kispest-Honvéd	60	(8)
1999	Haladás	12	(2)
1999–2000	Jeonbuk Hyundai Motors	17	(4)
2000–2001	Créteil	9	(3)
Total		149	(21)

Managerial career
- 2017–2020: TSC (assistant)
- 2021: TSC (caretaker)
- 2024: Tisa Adorjan
- * Club domestic league appearances and goals

Mirko Jovanović (Serbian Cyrillic: Мирко Јовановић; born 14 March 1971) is a Serbian football manager and former player.

== Playing career ==
After coming through the youth system at Vojvodina, Jovanović played for Mačva Šabac and Spartak Subotica, before moving abroad. He went on to play in Slovakia (1. FC Košice), Hungary (Kispest-Honvéd and Haladás), South Korea (Jeonbuk Hyundai Motors), and France (Créteil).

== Managerial career ==
In 2017, Jovanović joined TSC as assistant manager to Petar Kurćubić. He also served as an assistant to Predrag Rogan and later Zoltan Sabo, remaining in the role until Sabo's death in December 2020. Subsequently, Jovanović became the club's sporting director. He was appointed as caretaker manager of TSC in October 2021, replacing Mladen Krstajić.

Between January and April 2024, Jovanović served as manager of Serbian League Vojvodina club Tisa Adorjan.

== Honours ==
Kispest-Honvéd

- Magyar Kupa: 1995–96
