= Nenad Milovanović =

Serbian footballer and manager

Personal information
- Date of birth: 15 August 1969 (age 57)
- Place of birth: Čačak, SFR Yugoslavia
- Position: Midfielder

Senior career*
Years	Team	Apps	(Gls)
1989–1990	Mladost Lučani	10	(0)

Managerial career
- 2007–2008: Mladost Lučani
- 2008: Borac Čačak
- 2008–2009: Jagodina
- 2009–2010: Metalac Gornji Milanovac
- 2010: Borac Čačak
- 2011: Metalac Gornji Milanovac
- 2012–2013: Napredak Kruševac
- 2013: Mladost Lučani
- 2013–2014: Napredak Kruševac
- 2014–2019: Mladost Lučani
- 2019: Serbia U21
- 2020–2021: Mladost Lučani
- * Club domestic league appearances and goals

Nenad "Neško" Milovanović (Serbian Cyrillic: Ненад Нешко Миловановић; born 15 August 1969) is a Serbian football manager and former player.

During his managerial career, Milovanović worked at Mladost Lučani, Borac Čačak, Jagodina, Metalac Gornji Milanovac and Napredak Kruševac.

== Career ==
Milovanović served as manager of Mladost Lučani during the 2007–08 Serbian SuperLiga. He subsequently took charge at Borac Čačak while the club participated in the 2008–09 UEFA Cup, being eliminated by Dutch side Ajax in the first round. In June 2012, Milovanović was appointed manager of Napredak Kruševac. He led the team to a convincing first-place finish in the 2012–13 Serbian First League, before resigning from the position.

In early 2014, Milovanović returned to Mladost Lučani, helping them win the 2013–14 Serbian First League and gain promotion to the top flight. They later finished in fourth place in the 2016–17 Serbian SuperLiga, securing a spot in the 2017–18 UEFA Europa League. In the following season, Milovanović reached the Serbian Cup final, eventually losing to Partizan. He was appointed as sporting director of Mladost Lučani in July 2019, thus leaving his managerial role after five and a half years.

== Honours ==
Napredak Kruševac

- Serbian First League: 2012–13

Mladost Lučani

- Serbian First League: 2013–14
- Serbian Cup: Runner-up 2017–18
