= FK Mladost Lučani =

Serbian football club

Mladost Lučani
- Full name: FK Mladost Lučani
- Founded: 1952; 74 years ago
- Ground: SRC Mr Radoš Milovanović
- Capacity: 6,000
- President: Vladimir Đorđević
- Head coach: Radovan Ćurčić
- League: Serbian SuperLiga
- 2025–26: Serbian SuperLiga, 11th of 16
- Website: fkmladostlucani.com
Home colours	Away colours

FK Mladost Lučani (Serbian Cyrillic: ФК Младост Лучани) is a professional football club based in Lučani, Serbia. They compete in the Serbian SuperLiga, the top tier of the national league system.

== History ==
Founded in 1952, the club achieved its first notable success by winning the Yugoslav Inter-Republic League (Group East) in 1989, thus earning promotion to the Yugoslav Second League. However, they were relegated after just one season, finishing bottom of the table.

Upon the breakup of Yugoslavia, the club started off in the Second League of FR Yugoslavia. They won first place in 1995 and took promotion to the First League (I/B League). The club spent the following three seasons in the First League (the last two in the I/A League), before suffering relegation in 1998. They earned another promotion to the top flight after winning the Second League (Group West) in 2001, but were narrowly relegated back the next year. Regardless, the club's striker Zoran Đurašković was crowned the competition's top scorer with 27 goals.

After winning the Serbian First League in 2007, the club was promoted to the Serbian SuperLiga. They placed in the middle of the table in their debut appearance, but were forced to withdraw from the competition due to financial issues. Over the next six seasons, the club played in the Serbian First League, the second tier of the national league pyramid. They earned promotion back to the SuperLiga after winning the First League in 2013–14. With a seventh-place finish in its comeback season, the club tied its previous record from the 2007–08 campaign. Moreover, Patrick Friday Eze concluded the season as the league's top scorer with 15 goals.

Led by manager Nenad Milovanović, the club achieved its best ever league standing in the 2016–17 season, finishing in fourth place and securing a spot in European competitions for the first time in history. They were, however, eliminated by Azerbaijani side Inter Baku in the first qualifying round of the 2017–18 UEFA Europa League, losing 5–0 on aggregate. On the domestic stage, the club made another historical success by reaching the final of the 2017–18 Serbian Cup. They eventually lost 2–1 to Partizan after initially leading 1–0.

== Honours ==
- Serbian Cup
  - Runner-up: 2017–18
- Second League of FR Yugoslavia / Serbian First League (Tier 2)
  - Champions: 1994–95, 2000–01 (Group West) / 2006–07, 2013–14
- Yugoslav Inter-Republic League / Serbian League West (Tier 3)
  - Champions: 1988–89 (Group East) / 2003–04, 2005–06

== Seasons ==
Season	League									Cup	Continental
Season	Division	Pld	W	D	L	GF	GA	Pts	Pos	Cup	Continental
Serbia and Montenegro
1995–96	1 – I/B	18	8	5	5	26	20	29	3rd	Round of 16	—
1995–96	1 – I/A	18	8	2	8	24	27	32	5th	Round of 16	—
1996–97	1 – I/A	33	12	5	16	45	59	41	8th	Quarter-finals	—
1997–98	1 – I/A	33	9	3	21	25	54	30	12th	Round of 32	—
1998–99	2 – West	21 (Note: The season was cut short due to the NATO bombing of Yugoslavia.)	9	2	10	21	27	29	10th	Round of 16	—
1999–2000	2 – West	34	23	6	5	70	26	70 (Note: The club was docked five points.)	2nd	—	—
2000–01	2 – West	34	24	6	4	81	27	78	1st	Round of 32	—
2001–02	1	34	12	6	16	42	42	42	15th	—	—
2002–03	2 – West	33	8	11	14	35	43	35	9th	Round of 16	—
2003–04	3 – West	34	24	5	5	91	31	77	1st	—	—
2004–05	2 – Serbia	38	7	5	26	27	60	26	20th	—	—
2005–06	3 – West	34	27	5	2	86	14	86	1st	Round of 32	—
Serbia
2006–07	2	38	24	10	4	49	19	82	1st	—	—
2007–08	1	33	8	14	11	32	41	38	7th (Note: The club withdrew from the league due to financial problems.)	Round of 32	—
2008–09	2	34	10	8	16	25	43	38	14th	Round of 32	—
2009–10	2	34	9	15	10	33	31	42	14th	Round of 16	—
2010–11	2	34	11	12	11	29	32	45	9th	Preliminary round	—
2011–12	2	34	13	14	7	42	27	53	3rd	Round of 32	—
2012–13	2	34	10	13	11	31	35	43	9th	Round of 32	—
2013–14	2	30	18	6	6	42	20	60	1st	Round of 32	—
2014–15	1	30	11	7	12	41	47	40	7th	Round of 32	—
2015–16	1	37	11	14	12	34	44	31	9th	Round of 32	—
2016–17	1	37	18	6	13	46	44	36	4th	Quarter-finals	—
2017–18	1	37	11	11	15	44	52	27	10th	Runners-up	Europa League – First qualifying round
2018–19	1	37	16	9	12	49	37	34	5th	Semi-finals	—
2019–20	1	30 (Note: The season was shortened due to the COVID-19 pandemic in Serbia.)	13	4	13	31	40	43	9th	Quarter-finals	—
2020–21	1	38	15	9	14	43	59	54	7th	Round of 16	—
2021–22	1	37	12	9	16	46	52	45	11th	Round of 32	—
2022–23	1	37	9	11	17	40	57	38	11th	Round of 32	—
2023–24	1	37	13	7	17	38	53	46	7th	Round of 32	
2024–25	1	37	12	11	14	38	48	47	8th	Round of 16	

== European record ==
Season	Competition	Round	Opponent	Score	Aggregate
2017–18	Europa League	First qualifying round	(Azerbaijan) Inter Baku	0–3 (H), 0–2 (A)	0–5

== Players ==
=== First-team squad ===
As of 8 August 2026

Note: Flags indicate national team as defined under FIFA eligibility rules; some limited exceptions apply. Players may hold more than one non-FIFA nationality.

No.	Pos.	Nation	Player
1	GK	SRB	Saša Stamenković
3	DF	SRB	Nemanja Petrović
4	FW	SRB	Vuk Bradić
5	MF	SRB	Veljko Kijevčanin
7	DF	SRB	Nikola Andrić
8	MF	MNE	Janko Tumbasević (vice-captain)
9	MF	SRB	Petar Bojić
10	FW	SRB	Ognjen Krsmanović
11	FW	SRB	Ognjen Bondžulić
12	DF	SRB	Milan Joksimović
13	MF	SRB	Filip Čavić
14	DF	UKR	Taras Bondarenko
15	DF	SRB	Vuk Simićević
16	DF	SRB	Vuk Božović
17	MF	SRB	Aleksandar Varjačić
19	FW	SRB	Jovan Popović
20	DF	SRB	Aleksa Milošević
21	GK	SRB	Nikola Popović
22	DF	SRB	Mihailo Todosijević
23	DF	SRB	Sergej Manović

No.	Pos.	Nation	Player
24	MF	SRB	Vukašin Marković
25	MF	SRB	Jovan Ćirić
27	DF	SRB	Nenad Radić
28	DF	SRB	Nikola Boranijašević
29	MF	SRB	Dušan Jovančić
30	MF	SRB	Nikola Ćirković (captain)
31	FW	SRB	Ognjen Alempijević
32	MF	SRB	Branko Jovičić
33	DF	SRB	Vukašin Jovanović
36	MF	SRB	David Đokić
37	DF	SRB	Filip Mladenović
39	FW	CMR	John Mary
40	MF	SRB	Nikola Ćirović
42	MF	SRB	Jagoš Đurković
44	DF	SRB	Miloš Cvetković
76	GK	SRB	Dušan Begović
77	DF	SRB	Marko Kerkez
88	MF	MKD	Vasil Tashovski
99	GK	SRB	Željko Samčović

=== On dual registration ===
Note: Flags indicate national team as defined under FIFA eligibility rules; some limited exceptions apply. Players may hold more than one non-FIFA nationality.

No.	Pos.	Nation	Player
31	FW	SRB	Ognjen Alempijević (with Borac 1926 until the end of the 2026–27 season)

=== Out on loan ===
Note: Flags indicate national team as defined under FIFA eligibility rules; some limited exceptions apply. Players may hold more than one non-FIFA nationality.

No.	Pos.	Nation	Player
—	GK	SRB	Bogdan Matijašević (at Novi Pazar until the end of the 2026–27 season)
—	DF	BIH	Dražen Dubačkić (at Bor until the end of the 2026–27 season)
—	DF	SRB	Nemanja Žunić (at OFK Vršac until the end of the 2026–27 season)

No.	Pos.	Nation	Player
—	MF	SRB	Đorđe Marinković (at Bor until the end of the 2026–27 season)
—	MF	SRB	Miloš Divac (at Zlatibor Čajetina until the end of the 2026–27 season)

=== Coaching staff ===
Position	Name
Head coach	(Serbia) Radovan Ćurčić
Second assistant coach	(Serbia) Nermin Useni (Serbia) Vladimir Radivojević
Coach analyst	(Serbia) Milovan Milović
Goalkeeper coach	(Serbia) Zlatko Zečević
Fitness coach	(Serbia) Dimitrije Markićević
Doctor	(Serbia) Snežana Markićević
Physiotherapist	(Serbia) Miloš Stojić (Serbia) Srđan Kuzmanović

=== Notable players ===
This is a list of players who have played at full international level.

- (Armenia) Ognjen Čančarević
- (Azerbaijan) Murad Hüseynov
- (Bosnia and Herzegovina) Admir Aganović
- (Bosnia and Herzegovina) Irfan Hadžić
- (Bosnia and Herzegovina) Siniša Saničanin
- (Chad) Misdongarde Betolngar
- (Montenegro) Milan Jovanović
- (Montenegro) Janko Tumbasević
- (North Macedonia) Tome Kitanovski
- (North Macedonia) Aleksandar Lazevski
- (Senegal) Badara Badji
- (Serbia) Dušan Anđelković
- (Serbia) Nikola Ćirković
- (Serbia) Marko Jevremović
- (Serbia) Lazar Jovanović
- (Serbia) Saša Jovanović
- (Serbia) Nemanja Mićević
- (Serbia) Nemanja Milunović
- (Serbia) Marko Mirić
- (Serbia) Milan Radin
- (Serbia) Dragan Rosić
- (Serbia) Miloš Stanojević
- (Serbia) Nemanja Tomić
- (Serbia and Montenegro) Jovan Markoski
- (Uzbekistan) Husniddin Gafurov

For a list of all FK Mladost Lučani players with a Wikipedia article, see Category:FK Mladost Lučani players.

== Historical list of coaches ==
- (Bosnia and Herzegovina) Jusuf Čizmić (1995-1996)
- (Serbia and Montenegro) Dušan Radonjić (1996)
- (Serbia and Montenegro) Branko Radović (1997)
- (Serbia and Montenegro) Miloslav Radenović (1997)
- (Bosnia and Herzegovina) Jusuf Čizmić (1997-1998)
- (Serbia and Montenegro) Ivan Milutinović (1998)
- (Serbia and Montenegro) Jovan Kovrlija (2001)
- (Serbia and Montenegro) Stanislav Karasi (2001)
- (Serbia and Montenegro) Jovan Kovrlija (2002)
- (Serbia) Predrag Plazinić (2006–2007)
- (Serbia) Nenad Milovanović (2007–2008)
- (Serbia) Živorad Jelić (200?)
- (Serbia) Ljubiša Dmitrović (2009)
- (Serbia) Nenad Markićević (2010)
- (Serbia) Miloljub Kovačević (2010)
- (Serbia) Branko Božović (2011)
- (Serbia) Dejan Nikolić (2011–2012)
- (Serbia) Neško Milovanović (2012)
- (Serbia) Ljubiša Dmitrović (2012–2013)
- (Serbia) Nenad Milovanović (2013)
- (Serbia) Vladica Petrović (2013)
- (Serbia) Nenad Milovanović (2014–2019)
- (Serbia) Goran Stanić (2019–2020)
- (Serbia) Nenad Milanović (2020)
- (Serbia) Nenad Milovanović (2020–2021)
- (Serbia) Darko Rakočević (2021)
- (Serbia) Ivan Stefanović (Jun 2021-Dec 21)
- (Serbia) Dragiša Žunić (Jan 2022–Mar 23)
- (Serbia) Milorad Kosanović (30 Mar 2023-May 23)
- (Serbia) Tomislav Sivić (2023)
- (Serbia) Igor Savić (Jun 2023-Oct 23)
- (Serbia) Tomislav Sivić (Oct 2023–2024)
- (Serbia) Nermin Useni (caretaker) (2024)
- (Serbia) Dejan Joksimović (Jun 2024- 11 Aug 24)
- (Serbia) Nenad Lalatović (Aug 2024-Oct 24)
- (Serbia) Nermin Useni (caretaker) (2024)
- (Serbia) Nikola Trajković (22 Oct 2024–26 May 25)
- (Serbia) Mladen Dodić (Jun 2025- Aug 25)
- (Serbia) Nenad Lalatović (22 Aug 2025-19 Dec 25)
- (Serbia) Dragiša Žunić (Jan 2026-)
