= Jovica Škoro =

Serbian football manager and player

Personal information
- Date of birth: 12 December 1947 (age 78)
- Place of birth: Rusko Selo, PR Serbia, FPR Yugoslavia
- Position: Striker

Youth career
- Crvena Zvezda Rusko Selo

Senior career*
Years	Team	Apps	(Gls)
- Odred Kikinda
1968–1969	Bečej		
1969–1979	Napredak Kruševac	240	(115)

Managerial career
- 1992: Napredak Kruševac
- 1993: Napredak Kruševac
- 1996: Napredak Kruševac
- 1996–1997: Budućnost Valjevo
- 1999: Napredak Kruševac
- 2000: Radnički Niš
- 2000–2003: Sartid Smederevo
- 2005–2007: Napredak Kruševac
- 2008: Napredak Kruševac
- 2009–2010: Napredak Kruševac
- 2010: Novi Pazar
- 2011: Jagodina
- 2011: Metalac Gornji Milanovac
- 2013: Jošanica
- * Club domestic league appearances and goals

Jovica Škoro (Serbian Cyrillic: Јовица Шкоро; born 12 December 1947) is a Serbian former football manager and player.

== Playing career ==
After playing one season for Bečej in the Vojvodina League, Škoro joined Yugoslav Second League side Napredak Kruševac in 1969. He would spend the following decade at the club, becoming the club's all-time leading scorer. In total, Škoro netted 115 league goals in 240 appearances. He also helped the team win promotion to the Yugoslav First League on two occasions in 1976 and 1978. At the height of his career, Škoro scored a hat-trick in a memorable 4–0 friendly win over Tottenham Hotspur.

== Managerial career ==
After hanging up his boots, Škoro served as manager of Napredak Kruševac on numerous occasions. He was most notably manager of Sartid Smederevo from October 2000 until his resignation in April 2003, leading the team to a best-ever third-place league finish in the 2001–02 season, as well as reaching the FR Yugoslavia Cup final in the same year. Later on, Škoro was briefly manager of Serbian SuperLiga clubs Jagodina (2011) and Metalac Gornji Milanovac (2011).

== Career statistics ==
Club	Season	League	
Club	Season	Apps	Goals
Napredak Kruševac	1969–70	20	3
Napredak Kruševac	1970–71	28	11
Napredak Kruševac	1971–72	33	19
Napredak Kruševac	1972–73	34	25
Napredak Kruševac	1973–74	12	5
Napredak Kruševac	1974–75	17	4
Napredak Kruševac	1975–76	29	20
Napredak Kruševac	1976–77	29	11
Napredak Kruševac	1977–78	32	15
Napredak Kruševac	1978–79	6	2
Napredak Kruševac	Total	240	115

== Honours ==
Napredak Kruševac

- Yugoslav Second League: 1975–76 (Group East), 1977–78 (Group East)
