= Nenad Lalatović =

Serbian football manager (born 1977)

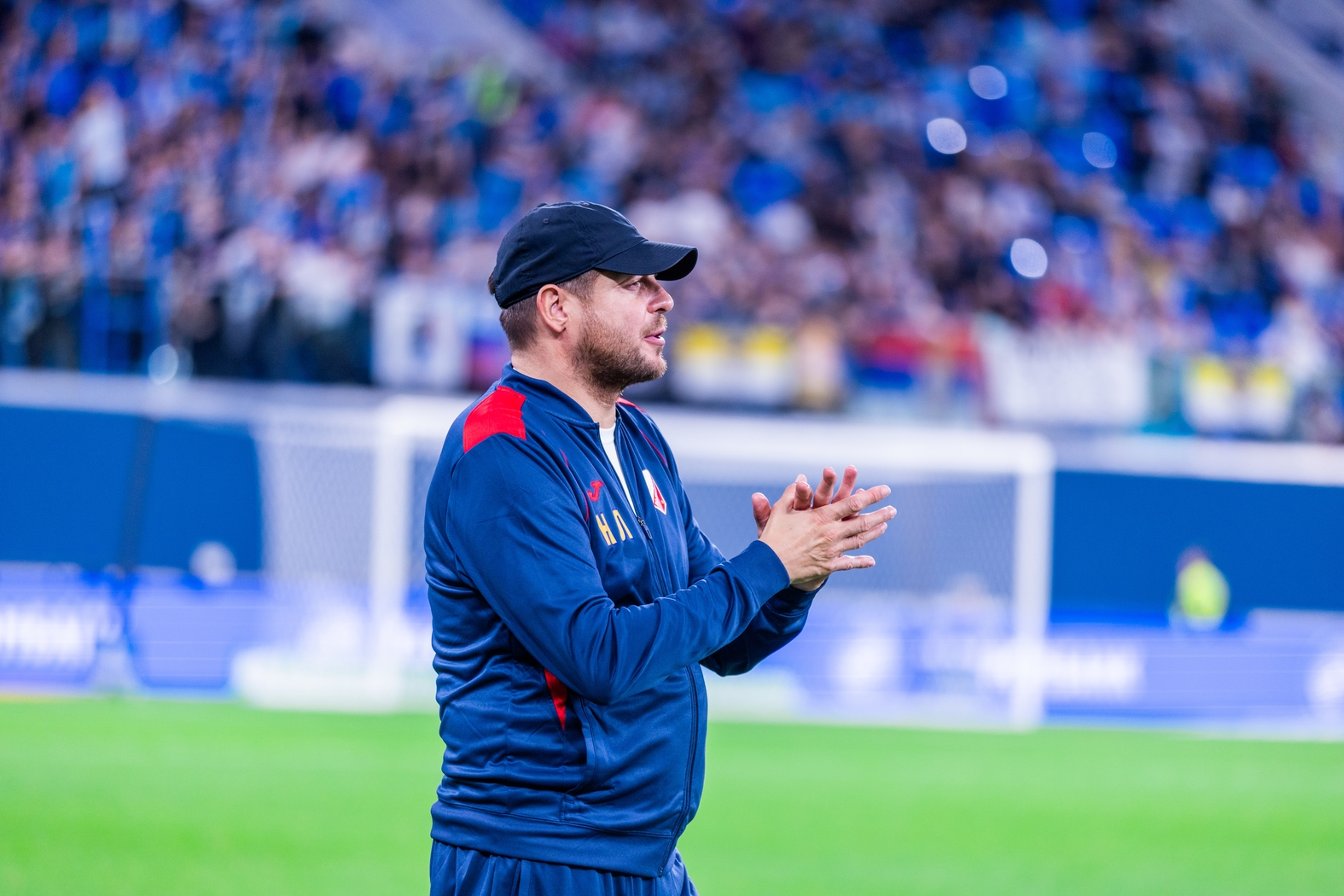
- Lalatović in 2024

Personal information
- Date of birth: 22 December 1977 (age 48)
- Place of birth: Belgrade, SFR Yugoslavia
- Height: 1.89 m (6 ft 2 in)
- Position: Defender

Youth career
- Red Star Belgrade

Senior career*
Years	Team	Apps	(Gls)
1996–2002	Red Star Belgrade	87	(4)
1996	→ OFK Beograd (loan)	3	(0)
1996	→ Radnički Kragujevac (loan)	12	(0)
1997–1999	→ Milicionar (loan)	41	(0)
2003–2005	Shakhtar Donetsk	14	(0)
2003–2005	→ Shakhtar-2 Donetsk	7	(0)
2004	→ VfL Wolfsburg II (loan)	5	(0)
2006	Zemun	5	(0)
2006–2007	OFK Beograd	10	(0)
Total		184	(4)

International career
1999	FR Yugoslavia U21	5	(0)
2000	FR Yugoslavia	1	(0)

Managerial career
- 2011: Srem
- 2011–2013: Proleter Novi Sad
- 2013–2014: Voždovac
- 2014: Napredak Kruševac
- 2014–2015: Red Star Belgrade
- 2015: Borac Čačak
- 2015–2016: Vojvodina
- 2016: Serbia U20
- 2016–2018: Čukarički
- 2017: Serbia U21
- 2018–2019: Radnički Niš
- 2019–2021: Vojvodina
- 2021: Radnički Niš
- 2021: Al Batin
- 2022: Radnički Kragujevac
- 2022: Borac Banja Luka
- 2022–2023: Radnički Niš
- 2023: Mladost Novi Sad
- 2023: Zorya Luhansk
- 2023–2024: Spartak Subotica
- 2024: Mladost Lučani
- 2024–2025: Vojvodina
- 2025: Budućnost Podgorica
- 2025: Mladost Lučani
- 2026: Novi Pazar
- 2026–: Novi Pazar
- * Club domestic league appearances and goals

Nenad Lalatović (Serbian: Ненад Лалатовић, pronounced [něnad lalȃːtoʋitɕ, - lǎː-]; born 22 December 1977) is a Serbian professional football manager and former player.He is currently the team's coach Novi Pazar.

== Playing career ==
In January 2003, Lalatović transferred to Ukrainian club Shakhtar Donetsk on a three-year deal. He failed to make an impact with the club, moving on loan to VfL Wolfsburg in early 2004. After returning to Donetsk, Lalatović made some appearances for the club in the 2004–05 season that won the league title. He later received a one-year ban from the Ukrainian FA for assaulting the referee after a match between Shakhtar-2 and Zorya Luhansk in October 2005.

== Managerial career ==
=== Serbia ===
On 23 June 2014, Lalatović was appointed coach of Red Star Belgrade. He signed a one-year contract with an option for two more seasons. On 24 May 2015, after the final game of the 2014–15 season, Lalatović became unattached.

On 29 June 2015, Lalatović was officially appointed coach of Borac Čačak. On 10 November, he parted ways with Borac Čačak due to unpaid wages and bonuses to his players. The same year on 11 November, Lalatović was appointed manager of Vojvodina until the end of the 2015–16 season. He extended his contract with the club for one more year on 11 June 2016. However, Lalatović terminated his contract with the club by mutual consent on 17 December 2016.

On 26 December 2016, Lalatović was appointed coach of Čukarički, signing a four-year contract. On 4 June 2018, he was appointed coach of Radnički Niš.

==== Return to Vojvodina ====
On 21 June 2019, Lalatović was appointed as new manager of Vojvodina for the second time in his managerial career. On 24 June 2020, beating Partizan on penalties, Vojvodina won the 2019–20 Serbian Cup, which was Lalatović's first trophy as manager.

=== Later career ===
On 5 June 2022, Bosnian Premier League club Borac Banja Luka appointed Lalatović as manager. On 7 July, he led the club to win its first UEFA Europa Conference League qualifying round match against Faroese club B36 Tórshavn, which ended in a 2–0 victory for Borac Banja Luka. Due to poor results, the last of which ended in a 1–0 defeat against Leotar, Lalatović resigned as coach on 26 August.

== Managerial statistics ==
As of 17 May 2026

Team	From	To	Record							
Team	From	To	P	W	D	L	GF	GA	GD	Win %
Srem	April 2011	September 2011	17	6	4	7	19	23	−4	35.29
Proleter Novi Sad	October 2011	June 2013	58	25	16	17	78	68	+10	43.10
Voždovac	15 June 2013	16 January 2014	17	5	4	8	16	19	−3	29.41
Napredak Kruševac	16 January 2014	23 June 2014	15	5	3	7	23	26	−3	33.33
Red Star Belgrade	23 June 2014	24 May 2015	32	20	7	5	47	21	+26	62.50
Borac Čačak	29 June 2015	10 November 2015	18	10	4	4	25	17	+8	55.56
Vojvodina	11 November 2015	17 December 2016	52	30	13	9	91	43	+48	57.69
Čukarički	26 December 2016	14 May 2018	60	32	11	17	101	64	+37	53.33
Serbia U21	1 March 2017	23 June 2017	6	1	2	3	5	7	−2	16.67
Radnički Niš	4 June 2018	30 May 2019	44	29	12	3	87	36	+51	65.91
Vojvodina	1 June 2019	31 May 2021	74	45	13	16	127	76	+51	60.81
Al Batin	25 June 2021	17 October 2021	8	1	3	4	5	11	−6	12.50
Radnički 1923	7 February 2022	31 May 2022	17	6	4	7	17	20	−3	35.29
Borac Banja Luka	5 June 2022	26 August 2022	9	4	1	4	11	12	−1	44.44
Radnički Niš	5 September 2022	5 March 2023	17	4	6	7	16	22	−6	23.53
Mladost Novi Sad	9 March 2023	9 June 2023	10	2	6	2	7	8	−1	20.00
Zorya Luhansk	9 July 2023	27 August 2023	7	2	2	3	7	10	−3	28.57
Spartak Subotica	16 November 2023	7 April 2024	14	4	3	7	14	20	−6	28.57
Mladost Lučani	12 August 2024	6 October 2024	7	6	0	1	13	8	+5	85.71
Vojvodina	9 October 2024	3 March 2025	17	7	6	4	24	17	+7	41.18
Budućnost Podgorica	26 June 2025	8 August 2025	7	1	2	4	5	8	−3	14.29
Mladost Lučani	26 August 2025	22 December 2025	15	5	4	6	12	17	−5	33.33
Novi Pazar	8 February 2026	Present	15	5	4	6	20	23	−3	33.33
Total			536	253	132	151	796	576	+220	47.20
