= List of FK Metalac Gornji Milanovac managers =

FK Metalac Gornji Milanovac is a professional football club based in Gornji Milanovac, Serbia.

== Managers ==
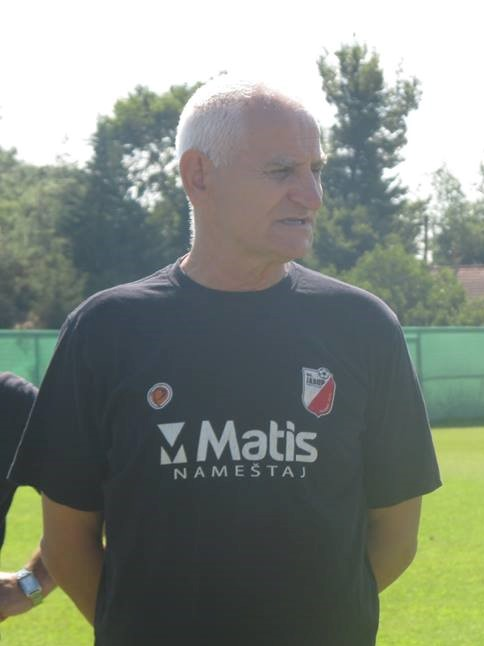
Slavenko Kuzeljević

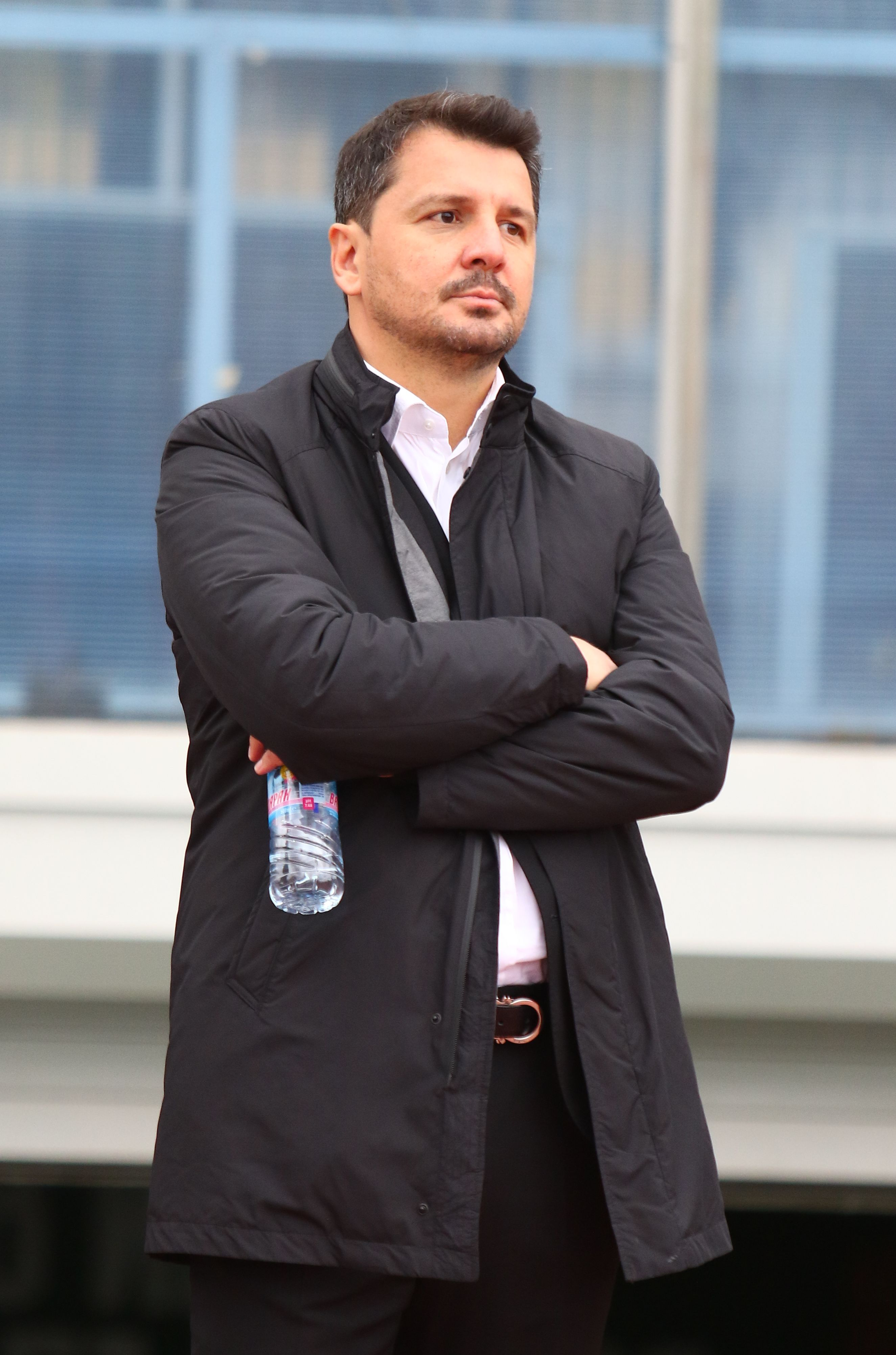
Miloš Kruščić

| Name | Period | | Pld | W | D | L | Win % | Honours |
| Name | From | To | Pld | W | D | L | Win % | Honours |
|---|---|---|---|---|---|---|---|---|
| (Federal Republic of Yugoslavia) Božidar Kostić | 1998 | 2000 | | | | | | |
| (Federal Republic of Yugoslavia) Dušan Radonjić | 2000 | 2000 | | | | | | |
| (Serbia and Montenegro) Miljojko Gošić | 2002 | 2003 | | | | | | |
| (Serbia and Montenegro) Slobodan Stašević | 2003 | 2003 | | | | | | |
| (Serbia and Montenegro) Dragan Lacmanović | 2003 | 2003 | | | | | | |
| (Serbia and Montenegro) Božidar Kostić | 2003 | 2003 | | | | | | |
| (Serbia and Montenegro) Slavko Vojičić | 2004 | 2004 | | | | | | |
| (Serbia and Montenegro) Miodrag Starčević | 2004 | 2004 | | | | | | |
| (Serbia and Montenegro) Miljojko Gošić | 2004 | 2005 | | | | | | |
| (Serbia) Slavenko Kuzeljević | 2005 | 2009 | | | | | | 2006–07 Serbian League West |
| (Serbia) Nenad Milovanović | May 2009 | April 2010 | | | | | | |
| (Serbia) Miodrag Starčević (caretaker) | 2010 | 2010 | | | | | | |
| (Serbia) Zvonko Živković | June 2010 | November 2010 | | | | | | |
| (Serbia) Miodrag Radanović | November 2010 | April 2011 | | | | | | |
| (Serbia) Nenad Milovanović | April 2011 | July 2011 | | | | | | |
| (Serbia) Milan Đuričić | July 2011 | September 2011 | | | | | | |
| (Serbia) Neško Milovanović (caretaker) | 2011 | October 2011 | | | | | | |
| (Serbia) Jovica Škoro | October 2011 | December 2011 | | | | | | |
| (Serbia) Neško Milovanović | 2012 | 2012 | | | | | | |
| (Serbia) Vladica Petrović | 2012 | 2012 | | | | | | |
| (Serbia) Dragan Lacmanović | 2012 | September 2012 | | | | | | |
| (Serbia) Vladica Petrović | September 2012 | June 2013 | | | | | | |
| (Serbia) Slavenko Kuzeljević | June 2013 | December 2013 | | | | | | |
| (Serbia) Aleksandar Janjić | December 2013 | June 2014 | | | | | | |
| (Serbia) Vladica Petrović | 2014 | May 2015 | | | | | | |
| (Serbia) Nenad Vanić | May 2015 | 2017 | | | | | | |
| (Serbia) Miloš Kruščić | June 2017 | April 2018 | | | | | | |
| (Serbia) Aleksandar Janjić | April 2018 | October 2018 | | | | | | |
| (Serbia) Aleksandar Stanković | October 2018 | June 2020 | | | | | | |
| (Serbia) Žarko Lazetić | June 2020 | November 2021 | | | | | | |
| (Serbia) Milija Žižić | November 2021 | June 2022 | | | | | | |
| (Serbia) Dejan Rađenović | June 2022 | September 2022 | | | | | | |
| (Serbia) Goran Matković | September 2022 | October 2022 | | | | | | |
| (Serbia) Vladica Petrović | November 2022 | August 2023 | | | | | | |
| (Serbia) Miloš Obradović | August 2023 | October 2023 | | | | | | |
| (Serbia) Vladimir Otašević | October 2023 | September 2024 | | | | | | |
| (Serbia) Goran Luković | September 2024 | | | | | | | |
