= 2024–25 Serbian SuperLiga =

Serbian SuperLiga
- Season: 2024–25
- Dates: 19 July 2024 – 25 May 2025
- Teams: 16
- Champions: Red Star Belgrade (11th title)
- Relegated: Tekstilac Odžaci; Jedinstvo Ub
- 2025–26 UEFA Champions League: Red Star Belgrade
- 2025–26 UEFA Europa League: Partizan
- 2025–26 UEFA Conference League: Novi Pazar; Radnički 1923
- Matches: 254
- Goals: 720 (2.83 per match)
- Top goalscorer: Cherif Ndiaye (19 goals)
- All statistics correct as of 28 May 2025.

The 2024–25 Serbian SuperLiga was the 19th season of the Serbian SuperLiga, the top flight of football in Serbia. The season kicked off on 19 July 2024 and ended on 25 May 2025. The title holder is Red Star Belgrade. The tournament features three promoted clubs, OFK Beograd, FK Jedinstvo Ub and FK Tekstilac Odžaci.

The draw was held on 10 June 2024.

== Teams ==
Sixteen teams compete in the league, the top 13 from previous season and three teams promoted from Serbian First League. Promoted teams were OFK Beograd who were returning to the SuperLiga after an eight years absence, Jedinstvo and Tekstilac both who were promoted to the SuperLiga for the first time in their history; they are replacing Javor, Voždovac and Radnik who were relegated after two, ten and nine years respectively in top tier.

=== Stadium and locations ===
Čukarički	IMT	Jedinstvo	Mladost Lučani
Čukarički Stadium	Lagator Stadium (temporarily)	Stadion "Dragan Džajić"	SRC MR Radoš Milovanović
Capacity: 4,070	Capacity: 8,030	Capacity: 4,000	Capacity: 8,000
Napredak	Locations of the 2024–25 Serbian SuperLiga teams Locations of the 2024–25 Serbian SuperLiga teams on the territory of Belgrade		Novi Pazar
Mladost Stadium	Locations of the 2024–25 Serbian SuperLiga teams Locations of the 2024–25 Serbian SuperLiga teams on the territory of Belgrade		Novi Pazar City Stadium
Capacity: 10,331	Locations of the 2024–25 Serbian SuperLiga teams Locations of the 2024–25 Serbian SuperLiga teams on the territory of Belgrade		Capacity: 10,000
Partizan	Locations of the 2024–25 Serbian SuperLiga teams Locations of the 2024–25 Serbian SuperLiga teams on the territory of Belgrade		Radnički 1923
Partizan Stadium	Locations of the 2024–25 Serbian SuperLiga teams Locations of the 2024–25 Serbian SuperLiga teams on the territory of Belgrade		Čika Dača Stadium
Capacity: 29,775	Locations of the 2024–25 Serbian SuperLiga teams Locations of the 2024–25 Serbian SuperLiga teams on the territory of Belgrade		Capacity: 15,100
Radnički	OFK Beograd	Red Star Belgrade	Spartak
Čair Stadium	Kraljevica Stadium (temporarily)	Rajko Mitić Stadium	Subotica City Stadium
Capacity: 18,151	Capacity: 8,168	Capacity: 53,000	Capacity: 13,000
TSC	Vojvodina	Tekstilac	Železničar
TSC Arena	Karađorđe Stadium	Slavko Maletin Vava Stadium	SC Mladost Stadium
Capacity: 4,500	Capacity: 14,853	Capacity: 5,500	Capacity: 2,300

=== Personnel, Kits and General sponsor ===
Note: Flags indicate national team as has been defined under FIFA eligibility rules. Players and Managers may hold more than one non-FIFA nationality.

Team	Head coach	Captain	Kit manufacturer	General Sponsor
Čukarički	(Serbia) Milan Lešnjak	(Serbia) Marko Docić	Adidas	Oliva
IMT	(Serbia) Zoran Vasiljević	(Serbia) Nikola Krstić	Seven	Meridianbet, Seven
Jedinstvo Ub	(Serbia) Uroš Matić	(Serbia) Ivan Jovanović	Seven	Seven
Mladost Lučani	(Serbia) Nikola Trajković	(Montenegro) Janko Tumbasević	Kelme	MB Lučani
Napredak	(Serbia) Mladen Dodić	(Serbia) Nebojša Bastajić	Givova	mt:s
Novi Pazar	(Serbia) Vladimir Gaćinović	(Serbia) Adem Ljajić	Macron	Doha Group
Partizan	(Serbia) Srđan Blagojević	(Serbia) Aleksandar Jovanović	Puma	MaxBet
Radnički 1923	(Bosnia and Herzegovina) Feđa Dudić	(Serbia) Milan Mitrović	Seven	AdmiralBet, Sportske.net
Radnički Niš	(Cyprus) Siniša Dobrašinović	(Cameroon) Mbouri Basile Yamkam	Masita	mt:s, MaxBet
OFK Beograd	(Bosnia and Herzegovina) Simo Krunić	(Serbia) Saša Marković	Joma	Mozzart Bet
Red Star Belgrade	(Serbia) Vladan Milojević	(Montenegro) Mirko Ivanić	Macron	Gazprom
Spartak	(Serbia) Tomislav Sivić	(Serbia) Danijel Kolarić	Legea	Ždrepčeva Krv
Tekstilac	(Serbia) Bojan Krulj	(Serbia) Nikola Marjanović	NAAI	Konvar
TSC	(Serbia) Slavko Matić	(Serbia) Nemanja Petrović	Capelli Sport	SAT-TRAKT, MOL
Vojvodina	(Serbia) Miroslav Tanjga	(Serbia) Slobodan Medojević	Joma	MaxBet, Srbijagas
Železničar	(Serbia) Radomir Koković	(Serbia) Dario Grgić	Puma	AdmiralBet, Sportske.net, HIP-Azotara

Notes

- Nike is the official ball supplier for Serbian SuperLiga.
- Capelli Sport is the official sponsor of the Referee's Committee of the Football Association of Serbia.

=== Managerial changes ===
Team	Outgoing manager	Manner of departure	Date of vacancy	Position in the table	Incoming manager	Date of appointment
Železničar	(Serbia) Tomislav Sivić	Sacked	28 May 2024	Pre-season	(Serbia) Marko Savić	9 June 2024
Radnički Niš	(Serbia) Dejan Joksimović	Sacked	1 June 2024	Pre-season	(Montenegro) Nikola Drinčić	6 June 2024
Partizan	(Serbia) Albert Nađ	Sacked	3 June 2024	Pre-season	(Serbia) Aleksandar Stanojević	6 June 2024
IMT	(Serbia) Nebojša Jandrić	Sacked	6 June 2024	Pre-season	(Serbia) Milan Đorđević	6 June 2024
Mladost Lučani	(Serbia) Nermin Useni (caretaker)	Sacked	12 June 2024	Pre-season	(Serbia) Dejan Joksimović	13 June 2024
Napredak	(Serbia) Ivan Stefanović	Sacked	16 June 2024	Pre-season	(Serbia) Goran Stevanović	19 June 2024
TSC	(Serbia) Žarko Lazetić	Signed by Maccabi Tel Aviv	16 June 2024	Pre-season	(Croatia) Dean Klafurić	28 June 2024
Novi Pazar	(Serbia) Slavko Matić	Sacked	20 June 2024	Pre-season	(Serbia) Nikola Trajković	28 June 2024
Mladost Lučani	(Serbia) Dejan Joksimović	Resigned	11 August 2024	9th	(Serbia) Nenad Lalatović	12 August 2024
Jedinstvo Ub	(Serbia) Ivan Radovanović	Resigned	14 August 2024	16th	(Serbia) Miloš Obradović	14 August 2024
Novi Pazar	(Serbia) Nikola Trajković	Resigned	25 August 2024	15th	(Serbia) Tomislav Sivić	25 August 2024
Vojvodina	(Montenegro) Božidar Bandović	Sacked	28 August 2024	14th	(Serbia) Nemanja Krtolica	14 September 2024
TSC	(Croatia) Dean Klafurić	Resigned	31 August 2024	11th	(Serbia) Jovan Damjanović	31 August 2024
Partizan	(Serbia) Aleksandar Stanojević	Resigned	24 September 2024	9th	(Serbia) Savo Milošević	27 September 2024
IMT	(Serbia) Milan Đorđević	Resigned	3 October 2024	15th	(North Macedonia) Milan Stojanoski	6 October 2024
Vojvodina	(Serbia) Nemanja Krtolica	Sacked	7 October 2024	8th	(Serbia) Nenad Lalatović	7 October 2024
Mladost Lučani	(Serbia) Nenad Lalatović	Signed by Vojvodina	7 October 2024	3rd	(Serbia) Nermin Useni (caretaker)	7 October 2024
Mladost Lučani	(Serbia) Nermin Useni (caretaker)	End of caretaker spell	22 October 2024	2nd	(Serbia) Nikola Trajković	22 October 2024
Spartak Subotica	(Serbia) Miloš Kruščić	Sacked	27 October 2024	15th	(Serbia) Vladimir Gaćinović	28 October 2024
Železničar	(Serbia) Marko Savić	Resigned	5 November 2024	11th	(Serbia) Milija Žižić (caretaker)	8 November 2024
Tekstilac	(Serbia) Branko Mirjačić	Sacked	11 November 2024	15th	(Serbia) Slavko Matić	13 November 2024
Železničar	(Serbia) Milija Žižić (caretaker)	End of caretaker spell	20 November 2024	11th	(Serbia) Branko Mirjačić	20 November 2024
IMT	(North Macedonia) Milan Stojanoski	Sacked	26 November 2024	14th	(Serbia) Zoran Vasiljević	26 November 2024
Čukarički	(Serbia) Goran Stanić	Resigned	29 November 2024	8th	(Serbia) Marko Savić	2 December 2024
Napredak	(Serbia) Goran Stevanović	Sacked	30 November 2024	12th	(Serbia) Zoran Ristić (caretaker)	30 November 2024
Partizan	(Serbia) Savo Milošević	Resigned	3 December 2024	2nd	(Serbia) Marko Jovanović (caretaker)	3 December 2024
Napredak	(Serbia) Zoran Ristić (caretaker)	End of caretaker spell	5 December 2024	12th	(Serbia) Slavoljub Đorđević	5 December 2024
Jedinstvo Ub	(Serbia) Miloš Obradović	Resigned	15 December 2024	16th	(Serbia) Nemanja Bradonjić (caretaker)	17 December 2024
Partizan	(Serbia) Marko Jovanović (caretaker)	End of caretaker spell	1 January 2025	2nd	(Serbia) Srđan Blagojević	1 January 2025
Jedinstvo Ub	(Serbia) Nemanja Bradonjić (caretaker)	End of caretaker spell	2 January 2025	16th	(Serbia) Uroš Matić	2 January 2025
Spartak Subotica	(Serbia) Vladimir Gaćinović	Resigned	4 February 2025	14th	(Serbia) Vladimir Torbica (caretaker)	9 February 2025
Novi Pazar	(Serbia) Tomislav Sivić	Signed by Spartak Subotica	11 February 2025	10th	(Serbia) Vladimir Gaćinović	11 February 2025
Spartak Subotica	(Serbia) Vladimir Torbica (caretaker)	End of caretaker spell	12 February 2025	14th	(Serbia) Tomislav Sivić	12 February 2025
TSC	(Serbia) Jovan Damjanović	Sacked	28 February 2025	9th	(Serbia) Slavko Matić	28 February 2025
Tekstilac	(Serbia) Slavko Matić	Signed by TSC	1 March 2025	15th	(Serbia) Milovan Pankov (caretaker)	2 March 2025
Vojvodina	(Serbia) Nenad Lalatović	Sacked	3 March 2025	6th	(Serbia) Miroslav Tanjga	3 March 2025
Tekstilac	(Serbia) Milovan Pankov (caretaker)	End of caretaker spell	3 March 2025	15th	(Serbia) Bojan Krulj	3 March 2025
Napredak	(Serbia) Slavoljub Đorđević	Resigned	4 March 2025	13th	(Serbia) Mladen Dodić	4 March 2025
Železničar	(Serbia) Branko Mirjačić	Sacked	5 March 2025	12th	(Serbia) Radomir Koković	5 March 2025
Radnički Niš	(Montenegro) Nikola Drinčić	Sacked	5 March 2025	11th	(Cyprus) Siniša Dobrašinović	5 March 2025
Čukarički	(Serbia) Marko Savić	Resigned	8 April 2025	9th	(Serbia) Milan Lešnjak	10 April 2025
Napredak	(Serbia) Mladen Dodić	Sacked	29 May 2025	Relegation play-offs	(Serbia) Zoran Ristić (caretaker)	29 May 2025

== Regular season ==
=== League table ===
Pos	Team	Pld	W	D	L	GF	GA	GD	Pts	Qualification
1	Red Star Belgrade	30	28	2	0	106	22	+84	86	Qualification for the Championship round
2	Partizan	30	18	9	3	58	29	+29	63	Qualification for the Championship round
3	OFK Beograd	30	13	7	10	40	39	+1	46	Qualification for the Championship round
4	Radnički 1923	30	13	6	11	47	40	+7	45	Qualification for the Championship round
5	Vojvodina	30	11	9	10	48	40	+8	42	Qualification for the Championship round
6	Mladost Lučani	30	11	9	10	32	35	−3	42	Qualification for the Championship round
7	TSC	30	12	5	13	47	44	+3	41	Qualification for the Championship round
8	Novi Pazar	30	11	7	12	46	54	−8	40	Qualification for the Championship round
9	Čukarički	30	10	9	11	37	40	−3	39	Qualification for the Relegation round
10	IMT	30	10	7	13	37	46	−9	37	Qualification for the Relegation round
11	Železničar Pančevo	30	9	8	13	37	37	0	35	Qualification for the Relegation round
12	Napredak Kruševac	30	9	8	13	29	40	−11	35	Qualification for the Relegation round
13	Spartak Subotica	30	8	10	12	26	40	−14	34	Qualification for the Relegation round
14	Radnički Niš	30	8	8	14	40	59	−19	32	Qualification for the Relegation round
15	Tekstilac Odžaci	30	9	4	17	25	52	−27	31	Qualification for the Relegation round
16	Jedinstvo Ub	30	4	4	22	22	60	−38	16	Qualification for the Relegation round

Source: SuperLiga (in Serbian)
Rules for classification: 1) Points; 2) Head-to-head points; 3) Head-to-head goal difference; 4) Head-to-head goals scored; 5) Head-to-head away goals scored (if two teams tied); 6) Goal difference; 7) Goals scored; 8) Fair play ranking; 9) Draw.

=== Results ===
Home \ Away	RSB	PAR	OFK	RDK	VOJ	MLA	TSC	NPZ	ČUK	IMT	ŽEL	NAP	SPA	RNI	TEK	JED
Red Star Belgrade		3–3	3–1	6–0	3–0	2–2	3–1	4–1	5–2	4–0	2–1	2–0	2–1	5–1	6–0	4–0
Partizan	0–4		4–1	2–2	0–0	2–0	0–0	3–2	3–1	1–1	2–0	0–0	2–2	3–1	4–1	3–0
OFK Beograd	0–1	3–2		3–5	3–1	0–0	2–2	1–1	1–2	4–3	1–2	0–2	1–1	2–0	1–0	3–0
Radnički 1923	0–1	0–2	2–0		2–2	1–0	1–3	2–0	1–1	1–3	2–3	1–0	2–0	4–0	1–0	4–0
Vojvodina	3–5	0–0	2–1	3–2		0–0	1–3	0–1	0–1	0–1	2–0	1–2	1–3	3–3	0–0	1–0
Mladost Lučani	0–2	1–3	1–2	2–1	1–3		4–1	1–3	3–1	1–0	1–1	1–0	0–0	1–1	1–2	2–1
TSC	1–2	1–2	0–1	0–2	1–3	1–2		5–2	2–1	1–0	1–0	4–2	0–0	4–1	1–2	2–0
Novi Pazar	1–7	3–4	0–0	2–0	0–4	0–1	2–1		2–2	3–1	3–1	2–0	3–2	3–3	2–3	3–1
Čukarički	1–4	0–1	0–1	1–1	3–1	0–0	1–2	1–1		0–2	2–0	0–0	1–2	2–0	3–0	2–1
IMT	1–3	0–0	1–1	0–4	0–3	3–0	0–2	0–0	1–1		1–1	3–2	1–2	3–1	3–0	2–0
Železničar	1–3	0–1	0–1	1–1	1–1	1–2	3–3	0–1	1–2	2–1		1–1	2–0	0–0	3–0	6–0
Napredak Kruševac	0–4	0–1	1–3	1–0	1–1	1–2	0–3	2–1	2–1	1–1	1–2		2–0	2–1	1–1	2–1
Spartak Subotica	1–5	2–1	0–1	1–0	0–4	0–0	0–0	1–1	1–1	2–0	0–0	0–2		1–1	1–0	1–0
Radnički Niš	0–3	0–1	1–1	1–2	1–4	1–1	1–0	2–1	2–2	3–0	2–1	3–1	3–2		1–2	1–4
Tekstilac Odžaci	0–4	1–4	2–0	0–1	1–3	1–0	2–1	2–1	0–1	1–2	0–2	0–0	2–0	1–3		1–1
Jedinstvo Ub	0–4	0–4	0–1	2–2	1–1	1–2	4–1	0–1	0–1	2–3	0–1	0–0	2–0	0–2	1–0	

Source: SuperLiga (in Serbian)
Legend: Blue = home team win; Yellow = draw; Red = away team win.
For upcoming matches, an "a" indicates there is an article about the rivalry between the two participants.

== Play-offs ==
=== Championship round ===
The top eight teams advance from the regular season. Teams play each other once.

==== League table ====
Pos	Team	Pld	W	D	L	GF	GA	GD	Pts	Qualification	RSB	PAR	NPZ	OFK	RDK	VOJ	TSC	MLA
1	Red Star Belgrade (C)	37	32	4	1	123	35	+88	100	Qualification for the Champions League second qualifying round		2–1		5–2		1–1		3–1
2	Partizan	37	21	10	6	73	40	+33	73	Qualification for the Europa League first qualifying round (Note: The winner of the 2024–25 Serbian Cup (Red Star Belgrade) qualifies for the Europa League first qualifying round, so the second place team (Partizan) takes the Europa League berth and the fourth place team gets a Conference League berth.)				2–2	3–1	3–2	1–2	
3	Novi Pazar	37	15	9	13	60	65	−5	54	Qualification for the Conference League second qualifying round	3–3	2–1				0–1		
4	OFK Beograd	37	15	8	14	53	54	−1	53	Ineligible for European competitions (Note: OFK Beograd qualified for the second qualifying round of the UEFA Conference League but failed to obtain a UEFA license. As a result, the berth was given to the fifth place Radnički 1923.)			2–3		3–0	1–2		1–0
5	Radnički 1923	37	15	8	14	60	53	+7	53	Qualification for the Conference League second qualifying round	4–1		2–3				5–2	1–1
6	Vojvodina	37	14	11	12	57	49	+8	53						0–0		0–3	3–1
7	TSC	37	15	5	17	59	58	+1	50		1–2		1–2	3–2				
8	Mladost Lučani	37	12	11	14	38	48	−10	47			0–4	1–1				2–0	

Source: SuperLiga (in Serbian)
Legend: Blue = home team win; Yellow = draw; Red = away team win.
Rules for classification: 1) Points; 2) Points in regular season; 3) Head-to-head points in regular season; 4) Head-to-head goal difference in regular season; 5) Head-to-head goals scored in regular season; 6) Head-to-head away goals scored in regular season (if two teams tied); 7) Goal difference; 8) Goals scored; 9) Fair play ranking; 10) Drawing of lots.
(C) Champions

=== Relegation round ===
The bottom eight teams from the regular season play in the relegation round. Teams play each other once.

==== League table ====
Pos	Team	Pld	W	D	L	GF	GA	GD	Pts	Qualification or relegation	CUK	ZEL	IMT	SPA	RNI	NAP	TEK	JED
1	Čukarički	37	12	13	12	47	49	−2	49			2–2	1–1	0–0	2–2			
2	Železničar	37	13	10	14	49	43	+6	49					3–0	1–2	1–1		3–1
3	IMT	37	13	9	15	49	55	−6	48			0–1		2–4		2–1	3–1	
4	Spartak Subotica	37	11	11	15	35	51	−16	44						1–0	2–1	2–4	
5	Radnički Niš	37	11	10	16	50	67	−17	43	Qualification for the play-off			1–1				1–0	3–1
6	Napredak Kruševac	37	11	9	17	35	48	−13	42	Qualification for the play-off	0–1				2–1		0–1	1–0
7	Tekstilac Odžaci (R)	37	11	4	22	33	65	−32	31 (Note: Tekstilac Odžaci had 6 points deducted for an irregular match against IMT.)	Relegation to Serbian First League	0–3	0–1						2–3
8	Jedinstvo Ub (R)	37	7	4	26	32	73	−41	25	Relegation to Serbian First League	4–1		0–3	1–0				

Source: SuperLiga (in Serbian)
Legend: Blue = home team win; Yellow = draw; Red = away team win.
Rules for classification: 1) Points; 2) Points in regular season; 3) Head-to-head points in regular season; 4) Head-to-head goal difference in regular season; 5) Head-to-head goals scored in regular season; 6) Head-to-head away goals scored in regular season (if two teams tied); 7) Goal difference; 8) Goals scored; 9) Fair play ranking; 10) Drawing of lots.
(R) Relegated

== Promotion/Relegation play-offs ==
=== Mladost Novi Sad vs Napredak ===
28 May 2025	Mladost Novi Sad	0–0	Napredak	Novi Sad
17:30 CEST (UTC+2)				Stadium: GAT Arena

1 June 2025	Napredak	1–0	Mladost Novi Sad	Kruševac
21:00 CEST (UTC+2)	Stoiljković 76'			Stadium: Mladost Stadium

=== FK Mačva vs Radnički Niš ===
28 May 2025	FK Mačva	0–0	Radnički Niš	Šabac
19:30 CEST (UTC+2)				Stadium: Gradski Stadion Mačva

1 June 2025	Radnički Niš	2–0	FK Mačva	Niš
17:30 CEST (UTC+2)	Stewart 60'; Tanko 81'			Stadium: Čair Stadium

== Top scorers ==
As of matches played on 25 May 2025.

Rank	Player	Club	Goals
1	(Senegal) Cherif Ndiaye	Red Star Belgrade	19
2	(Brazil) Bruno Duarte	Red Star Belgrade	16
3	(Israel) Bibras Natcho	Partizan	15
3	(Nigeria) Dele	Vojvodina	15
4	(Serbia) Lazar Romanić	Vojvodina	14

=== Player of the week ===
As of matches played on 25 May 2025.

Round	Player	Club	Goals	Assist	Ref.
1	(Serbia) Adem Ljajić	Novi Pazar	2	1	
2	(Serbia) Saša Stamenković	Mladost Lučani	0	0	
3	(Bosnia and Herzegovina) Stefan Kovač	Čukarički	1	1	
4	(Serbia) Ivan Davidović	Tekstilac Odžaci	2	0	
5	(Nigeria) Dele	Vojvodina	2	0	
6	(Tunisia) Louay Ben Hassine	Radnički 1923	1	0	
7	(Serbia) Aleksandar Jovanović	Partizan	0	0	
8	(Austria) Andrej Todoroski	Spartak Subotica	2	0	
9	(Senegal) Cherif Ndiaye	Red Star Belgrade	3	0	
10	(Ghana) Richardson Kwaku Denzell	Jedinstvo Ub	2	0	
11	(Ivory Coast) Caleb Zady Sery	Vojvodina ^{(2)}	2	0	
12	(Serbia) Luka Ilić	Red Star Belgrade ^{(2)}	3	0	
13	(Croatia) Tomislav Dadić	Radnički 1923 ^{(2)}	0	1	
14	(Serbia) Andrija Maksimović	Red Star Belgrade ^{(3)}	1	0	
15	(Serbia) Saša Stamenković ^{(2)}	Mladost Lučani ^{(2)}	0	0	
16	(Serbia) Jovan Nišić	Radnički Niš	1	1	
17	(Nigeria) Dele ^{(2)}	Vojvodina ^{(3)}	4	0	
18	(Serbia) Luka Ilić ^{(2)}	Red Star Belgrade ^{(4)}	4	0	
19	(Nigeria) Francis Ezeh	Železničar Pančevo	2	2	
20	(Serbia) Uroš Nikolić	Vojvodina ^{(4)}	1	2	
21	(Serbia) Vladimir Radočaj	IMT	0	1	
22	(Colombia) Dilan Ortíz	Mladost Lučani ^{(3)}	1	2	
23	(Israel) Bibras Natcho	Partizan ^{(2)}	1	1	
24	(Senegal) Cherif Ndiaye ^{(2)}	Red Star Belgrade ^{(5)}	2	0	
25	(Serbia) Njegoš Petrović	Vojvodina ^{(5)}	1	1	
26	(Serbia) Ilija Babić	Spartak Subotica ^{(2)}	2	0	
27	(Austria) Andrej Todoroski ^{(2)}	TSC	1	0	
28	(Republic of the Congo) Prestige Mboungou	TSC ^{(2)}	2	1	
29	(Serbia) Aleksandar Katai	Red Star Belgrade ^{(6)}	2	2	
30	(Serbia) Jovan Milošević	Partizan ^{(3)}	2	0	
31	(Serbia) Aleksandar Mesarović	Novi Pazar ^{(2)}	1	0	
32	(Serbia) Marko Milošević	Radnički 1923 ^{(3)}	0	0	
33	(Serbia) Saša Jovanović	TSC ^{(3)}	1	1	
34	(Serbia) Adem Ljajić ^{(2)}	Novi Pazar ^{(3)}	0	1	
35	(Serbia) Petar Stanić	TSC ^{(4)}	2	0	
36	(Serbia) Ognjen Ugrešić	Partizan ^{(4)}	2	0	
37	(Guinea) Issa Bah	Radnički 1923 ^{(4)}	2	0	

== Attendances ==
Rank	Club	Average
1	Crvena zvezda	10,719
2	Partizan	3,751
3	Radnički 1923	2,903
4	Novi Pazar	2,468
5	Vojvodina	1,981
6	TSC	1,514
7	Radnički Niš	1,117
8	Želeničar Pančevo	982
9	Napredak Kruševac	933
10	OFK	933
11	Jedinstvo Ub	722
12	Tekstilac Odžaci	664
13	IMT	656
14	Mladost Lučani	502
15	Čukarički	437
16	Spartak Subotica	419

== See also ==
- 2024–25 Serbian First League
- 2024–25 Serbian Cup
