= Jovan Lukić =

Jovan Lukić may refer to:

- Jovan Lukić (footballer, born 1997), Serbian footballer
- Jovan Lukić (footballer, born 2002), Serbian footballer
- John Lukic (born 1960), English football coach and footballer

== See also ==
- Jovan Lučić (born 1987), Canadian/Serbian football goalkeeper
