= Nemanja Ahčin =

Serbian footballer

Personal information
- Full name: Nemanja Ahčin
- Date of birth: 7 April 1994 (age 32)
- Place of birth: Pančevo, FR Yugoslavia
- Height: 1.81 m (5 ft 11 in)
- Position: Central midfielder

Team information
- Current team: Tekstilac Odžaci (on loan from Mladost Lučani)
- Number: 8

Youth career
- Red Star Belgrade

Senior career*
Years	Team	Apps	(Gls)
2012–2016	Red Star Belgrade	0	(0)
2012	→ Sopot (loan)	13	(0)
2013	→ Radnik Surdulica (loan)	14	(1)
2014	→ Grbalj (loan)	9	(0)
2014–2015	→ Mladost Lučani (loan)	16	(0)
2016	→ Novi Pazar (loan)	3	(0)
2016	Dinamo 1945	6	(2)
2017	Mačva Šabac	9	(0)
2017–2018	Inđija	13	(1)
2018	Krško	2	(0)
2018–2019	Vojvodina	0	(0)
2019–xxxx	Dinamo 1945	1	(0)
2025	Tekstilac Odžaci	16	(3)
2025–	Mladost Lučani	2	(0)
2026–	→ Tekstilac Odžaci (loan)	14	(0)
- * Club domestic league appearances and goals as of 14 May 2026

Nemanja Ahčin (Serbian Cyrillic: Немања Ахчин; born 7 April 1994) is a Serbian footballer who plays as a midfielder for Tekstilac Odžaci, on loan from Mladost Lučani.
