= Vasilije Veljko Milovanović =

Serbian footballer (born 1998)

Personal information
- Full name: Vasilije Veljko Milovanović
- Date of birth: 30 December 1998 (age 27)
- Place of birth: Kragujevac, FR Yugoslavia
- Height: 1.77 m (5 ft 10 in)
- Position: Midfielder

Team information
- Current team: Botev Ihtiman
- Number: 10

Youth career
- Radnički Kragujevac

Senior career*
Years	Team	Apps	(Gls)
2015–2018	Radnički Kragujevac	2	(0)
2017	→ Smederevo 1924 (loan)	6	(0)
2018	→ FAP (loan)		
2018–2019	Sloga Petrovac		
2019	Borac 1926		
2020	Šumadija Aranđelovac		
2021	Radnički Svilajnac		
2021	Sloga Bajna Bašta		
2022	Radnički 1912		
2022–2023	Slivnishki Geroy	24	(5)
2023–2024	Orestis Orestiada		
2024–	Botev Ihtiman	23	(10)
- * Club domestic league appearances and goals as of 31 December 2017

Vasilije Veljko Milovanović (Serbian Cyrillic: Василије Вељко Миловановић; born 30 December 1998) is a Serbian football midfielder. He is the son of Neško Milovanović.

== Club career ==
=== Radnički Kragujevac ===
Born in Kragujevac, Milovanović was promoted in the first team of Radnički 1923 He made his professional debut for in 29 fixture match of the 2014–15 Serbian SuperLiga season, replacing Jovan Lukić in the 86th minute of the Jagodina, played on 16 May 2015. He appeared in the final fixture of the season against Vojvodina, joining the game from the bench too. He started new season with the first team, but also stayed with youth for the next two seasons. On 5 October 2016, Milovanović scored a twice in a Kragujevac City Cup match against Sloga Lužnica. After he overgrown youth selection, Milovanović also started the 2017–18 Serbian First League campaign with the first squad. Later, in last days of the summer transfer window 2017, he moved on a one-year loan to Serbian League West side Smederevo as a bonus player.

== Career statistics ==
As of 15 June 2017

Appearances and goals by club, season and competition
Club	Season	League			Cup		Continental		Other		Total	
Club	Season	Division	Apps	Goals	Apps	Goals	Apps	Goals	Apps	Goals	Apps	Goals
Radnički Kragujevac	2014–15	Serbian SuperLiga	2	0	—		—		—		2	0
Radnički Kragujevac	2015–16	Serbian First League	0	0	0	0	—		—		0	0
Radnički Kragujevac	2016–17	Serbian League West	0	0	0	0	—		1 (Note: Including Kragujevac City Cup match against Sloga Lužnica)	2	1	2
Radnički Kragujevac	2017–18	Serbian First League	0	0	—		—		—		0	0
Radnički Kragujevac	Total		2	0	0	0	—		1	2	3	2
Smederevo 1924 (loan)	2017–18	Serbian League West	6	0	—		—		—		6	0
Career total			8	0	0	0	—		1	2	9	2
