= FK Tekstilac Odžaci =

Serbian football club

Tekstilac Odžaci
- Full name: Fudbalski Klub Tekstilac Odžaci
- Nickname: Plavo-beli (The Blue-Whites)
- Founded: 1919; 107 years ago
- Ground: City Stadium, Odžaci
- Capacity: 3,000
- President: Jovan Miletić
- Head coach: Branko Mirjačić
- League: Serbian First League
- 2024–25: Serbian SuperLiga, 15th of 16 (relegated)
- Website: fktekstilac1919.com
Home colours	Away colours

FK Tekstilac Odžaci (Serbian Cyrillic: ФК Текстилац Оџаци) is a professional football club based in Odžaci, Vojvodina, Serbia. They compete in the Serbian First League, the second tier of the national league system.

== History ==
Founded in 1919, the club played in the Vojvodina League in its inaugural 1958–59 season, placing second from the bottom and suffering relegation. They returned to the third tier of Yugoslav football in 1962–63, finishing as runners-up in the newly formed Serbian League North to narrowly miss out on promotion to the Yugoslav Second League. After the reorganization of the national league system in 1968, the club went on to compete in the Vojvodina League until 1979, except for 1974–75. They also qualified for the 1977–78 Yugoslav Cup, losing 2–1 to Dinamo Vinkovci in the opening round.

Between 1999 and 2015, the club competed in the Serbian League Vojvodina for 16 consecutive seasons. They won the Vojvodina League North in 2021 to return to the third tier of Serbian football after six years. In the 2022–23 season, the club finished as Serbian League Vojvodina champions and gained promotion to the Serbian First League. They placed fourth in their debut appearance in the second tier and earned a spot in the promotion play-offs. The club subsequently beat Javor Ivanjica 2–1 on aggregate in a two-legged tie and won promotion to the Serbian SuperLiga for the first time in its history.

== Honours ==
- Serbian League Vojvodina (Tier 3)
  - 2022–23
- Vojvodina League North (Tier 4)
  - 2020–21

== Seasons ==
Season	League									Cup
Season	Division	Pld	W	D	L	GF	GA	Pts	Pos	Cup
Serbia
2018–19	4 – Vojvodina North	30	10	6	14	35	49	36	12th	—
2019–20	4 – Vojvodina North	17 (Note: The season was cut short due to the COVID-19 pandemic in Serbia.)	7	1	9	22	33	22	10th	—
2020–21	4 – Vojvodina North	34	26	6	2	84	18	84	1st	—
2021–22	3 – Vojvodina	30	14	6	10	62	38	48	4th	—
2022–23	3 – Vojvodina	28	21	5	2	64	18	68	1st	—
2023–24	2	37	15	12	10	44	27	57	4th	—
2024–25	1	30	9	4	17	25	52	31	15th	Round of 32

== Players ==
=== First-team squad ===
As of 6 April 2026

Note: Flags indicate national team as defined under FIFA eligibility rules; some limited exceptions apply. Players may hold more than one non-FIFA nationality.

No.	Pos.	Nation	Player
1	GK	SRB	Bojan Brać
2	DF	SRB	Mark Milosavljević
3	DF	SRB	Lazar Konstantinov (on loan from IMT)
4	MF	SRB	Marko Pantić
5	DF	CMR	Brandon Etameh
6	DF	SRB	Nikola Puškar (on loan from Spartak Subotica)
7	DF	BIH	Strahinja Pantić
8	MF	SRB	Nemanja Ahčin (on loan from Mladost Lučani)
9	FW	MNE	Luka Radulović
10	FW	SRB	Ognjen Laušević
11	MF	BIH	Irfan Zulfić (captain)
12	GK	SRB	Aleksandar Knežević
13	DF	SEN	Fallou Coly (on loan from IMT)
14	MF	SRB	Leontije Vasić (dual registration with IMT)
15	DF	SRB	Marko Grujić
16	DF	SRB	Vukašin Radosavljević (on loan from IMT)

No.	Pos.	Nation	Player
17	FW	SRB	Miloš Zekić
18	DF	SRB	Aleksandar Kovačević
20	MF	SRB	Darko Stojanović (on loan from IMT)
21	DF	MNE	Vuk Matejić
22	FW	SRB	Mateja Bojović
23	DF	SRB	Đorđe Milinković
24	MF	SRB	Uroš Filimonović (on loan from Radnik Surdulica)
25	DF	SRB	Zarija Lambulić
26	FW	SRB	Krsta Đorđević
28	MF	GUI	Naby Sylla
39	DF	SRB	Despot Obrenović
40	FW	NGR	Mustapha Abiodun (on loan from IMT)
41	DF	SRB	Stefan Filipović
80	FW	SRB	Branislav Kocić
92	GK	CRO	Borna Bošnjak
99	MF	SRB	Kristijan Radović

=== Players with multiple nationalities ===
- (Serbia) (Slovenia) Mark Milosavljević
- (Serbia) (Hungary) Miloš Zekić
- (Montenegro) (Serbia) Luka Radulović
- (Montenegro) (Serbia) Vuk Matejić
- (Bosnia and Herzegovina) (Serbia) Irfan Zulfić

=== Out on loan ===
Note: Flags indicate national team as defined under FIFA eligibility rules; some limited exceptions apply. Players may hold more than one non-FIFA nationality.

No.	Pos.	Nation	Player
—	DF	SRB	Uroš Mojsilović (at Sloven until 30 June 2026)
—	MF	BIH	Marko Šušnjar (at FAP until 30 June 2026)

No.	Pos.	Nation	Player
—	MF	SRB	Nemanja Trifunović (at OFK Kikinda until 30 June 2026)

=== Coaching staff ===
Position	Name
Manager	(Serbia) Branko Mirjačić
Assistant manager	(Serbia) Vukašin Živković
Goalkeeping coach	(Serbia) Branislav Grahovac
Fitness coach	(Serbia) Viktor Rakočević
Physiotherapist	(Serbia) Miloš Marković
Doctor	(Serbia) Miroslav Arsić (Serbia) Dejan Mićanović
Economic	(Serbia) Milorad Savin
Security commissioner	(Serbia) Damir Vajagić
General secretary	(Serbia) Miloš Markuš
Managing director sport	(Serbia) Mihailo Janjić
Sporting director	(Serbia) Veselin Đurković

=== Notable players ===
This is a list of players who have played at full international level.

- (Montenegro) Savo Pavićević
- (Serbia) Aleksandar Davidov

For a list of all FK Tekstilac Odžaci players with a Wikipedia article, see Category:FK Tekstilac Odžaci players.

== Historical list of coaches ==
- (Serbia) Zoran Ćirić (2010)
- (Serbia) Trivo Ilić (2001)
- (Serbia) Saša Spasojčević (2011)
- (Serbia) Dragojlo Stanojlović (2011)
- (Serbia) Trivo Ilić (2011)
- (Serbia) Simo Podunavac (2012)
- (Serbia) Zoran Ćirić (2012–2013)
- (Serbia) Simo Podunavac (2013)
- (Serbia) Zoran Ćirić (2014)
- (Serbia) Simo Podunavac (2014)
- (Serbia) Saša Ignjatović (2014)
- (Serbia) Dragan Krsmanović (2015)
- (Serbia) Goran Đokić
- (Serbia) Saša Ignjatović
- (Serbia) Ivica Pančić
- (Serbia) Dragan Dakić
- (Serbia) Zoran Ćirić (2020)
- (Serbia) Slobodan Bačić (2021)
- (Serbia) Goran Lazarević (2021)
- (Serbia) Dragan Ivanović (2022)
- (Serbia) Saša Stojadinović (2022)
- (Serbia) Milovan Pankov (2022–2023)
- (Serbia) Branko Mirjačić (2023–2024)
- (Serbia) Slavko Matić (2024–2025)
- (Serbia) Bojan Krulj (2025)
- (Serbia) Milan Đorđević (2025)
- (Serbia) Milovan Pankov (2025–)
