= FK Jedinstvo Ub =

Serbian football club

Jedinstvo Ub
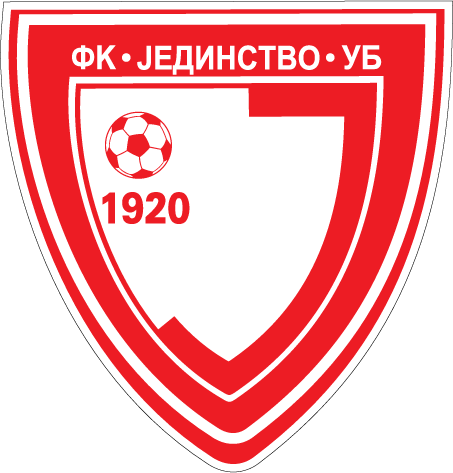
- Full name: FK Jedinstvo Ub
- Founded: 1920; 106 years ago
- Ground: Stadium Dragan Džajić
- Capacity: 4,000
- President: Darko Matić
- Head coach: Uroš Matić
- League: Serbian First League
- 2025–26: 6th
- Website: fkjedinstvoub.com
Home colours	Away colours

FK Jedinstvo Ub (Serbian Cyrillic: ФК Јединство Уб) is a professional football club based in Ub, Serbia. They compete in the Serbian First League, the second tier of the national league system.

== History ==
In the late 1990s, the club established a partnership with Red Star Belgrade, becoming their developmental affiliate. They would soon win the Serbian League Danube in 2000 to earn promotion to the Second League of FR Yugoslavia, thus reaching the second tier for the first time ever. After suffering relegation in 2002, the club secured promotion back the following year, spending the next three seasons in the second tier of Serbia and Montenegro football.

Between 2006 and 2012, the club spent six successive seasons in the Serbian League West, the third national tier. They would suffer relegation to the Drina Zone League for the second time in 2016. Soon after, the club was taken over by Serbia internationals Nemanja Matić and Radosav Petrović. They subsequently returned to the Serbian League West in 2017. In 2020, the club celebrated its 100th anniversary.

In June 2022, the club was administratively promoted to the Serbian First League to fill the vacant spot left by Žarkovo.

== Honours ==
- Serbian League Danube (Tier 3)
  - Champions: 1999–2000, 2002–03
- Serbian First League (Tier 2)
  - Runners-up: 2023–24

== Seasons ==
Season	League									Cup
Season	Division	Pld	W	D	L	GF	GA	Pts	Pos	Cup
Serbia and Montenegro
1998–99	3 – Danube	17 (Note: The season was cut short due to the NATO bombing of Yugoslavia.)	–	–	–	–	–	19	15th	—
1999–2000	3 – Danube	38	28	8	2	103	32	92	1st	—
2000–01	2 – West	34	12	8	14	42	46	44	8th	—
2001–02	2 – West	32	13	10	9	50	41	49	10th	—
2002–03	3 – Danube	32	24	7	1	112	14	79	1st	—
2003–04	2 – West	36	16	11	9	51	35	59	3rd	Round of 16
2004–05	2 – Serbia	38	13	14	11	44	35	53	7th	Round of 32
2005–06	2 – Serbia	38	11	7	20	37	54	40	17th	—
Serbia
2006–07	3 – West	34	14	5	15	46	46	47	12th	—
2007–08	3 – West	30	9	12	9	29	35	39	8th	—
2008–09	3 – West	30	12	6	12	27	29	42	4th	—
2009–10	3 – West	30	11	6	13	25	35	39	10th	—
2010–11	3 – West	30	10	7	13	34	41	37	11th	—
2011–12	3 – West	30	7	7	16	30	50	28	14th	—
2012–13	4 – Drina	30	17	11	2	53	24	62	2nd	—
2013–14	4 – Drina	30	19	5	6	62	24	62	2nd	—
2014–15	3 – West	30	11	13	6	32	22	46	4th	—
2015–16	3 – West	30	8	12	10	26	32	36	13th	—
2016–17	4 – Drina	30	22	5	3	53	13	71	2nd	—
2017–18	3 – West	34	18	6	10	41	25	60	4th	—
2018–19	3 – West	30	16	6	8	46	21	54	3rd	—
2019–20	3 – West	19 (Note: The season was cut short due to the COVID-19 pandemic in Serbia.)	11	2	6	24	17	35	4th	—
2020–21	3 – West	34	21	5	8	59	29	68	2nd	—
2021–22	3 – West	30	16	8	6	44	19	56	3rd (Note: The club was administratively promoted to fill the vacant spot left by Žarkovo.)	—
2022–23	2	37	14	11	12	45	38	53	6th	—
2023–24	2	30	15	7	8	38	30	52	2nd	—
2024–25	1	30	4	4	22	22	60	16	16th	—

== Current squad ==
As of 9 August 2026

Note: Flags indicate national team as defined under FIFA eligibility rules; some limited exceptions apply. Players may hold more than one non-FIFA nationality.

No.	Pos.	Nation	Player
1	GK	SRB	Ivan Jovanović (captain)
2	DF	SRB	Uroš Ćuk
4	DF	SRB	Danilo Nešić
5	DF	SRB	Luka Đurđević
6	DF	BIH	Dragan Bilbija
7	FW	SRB	Marko Vranješ
9	FW	SRB	Nikola Paunović
11	FW	SRB	Dušan Lišanin
14	DF	MKD	Mateo Kesić
17	FW	GHA	Enock Okain
20	MF	NIG	Abdel Jelil Ahamat
22	DF	SRB	Nenad Grujić
23	MF	SRB	Nikola Jokić
25	DF	SRB	Uroš Savković
26	DF	SRB	Dimitrije Aćimović (vice-captain)

No.	Pos.	Nation	Player
31	FW	GHA	Richardson Kwaku Denzell
36	MF	SRB	Mihajlo Terzić
37	MF	SRB	Jakov Jovanović
39	DF	SRB	Marko Miljković
41	GK	SLO	Jure Ribič
42	MF	MNE	Luka Raičević
47	FW	SRB	Uroš Damnjanović
49	MF	SRB	Matija Buđevac
53	DF	SRB	Nikola Popadić
54	MF	SRB	Matija Simić
55	MF	SRB	Vojin Vesković
78	GK	SRB	Merdan Ganić
88	MF	SRB	Viktor Petrović
89	GK	SRB	Vukašin Jovanović
99	FW	POR	Diogo Ferreira

=== Players with multiple nationalities ===
- (Serbia) (Bosnia and Herzegovina) Nikola Jokić
- (Montenegro) (Serbia) Luka Raičević
- (Bosnia and Herzegovina) (Serbia) Dragan Bilbija

=== Out on loan ===
Note: Flags indicate national team as defined under FIFA eligibility rules; some limited exceptions apply. Players may hold more than one non-FIFA nationality.

No.	Pos.	Nation	Player
—	GK	SRB	Mihajlo Pešić (at Radnički Obrenovac until 30 June 2027)
—	FW	UZB	Amirbek Saidov (at Sogdiana until 31 December 2026)

=== Technical staff ===
As of 9 August 2026

Current technical staff
- Head coach: (Serbia) Uroš Matić
- Assistant coach: (Serbia) Miloš Obradović
- Assistant coach: (Serbia) Marko Rajović
- Goalkeeper coach: (Serbia) Ivan Ivanović
- Goalkeeper coach: (Serbia) Predrag Ristović
- Economic: (Serbia) Tomislav Jevtić
- Economic: (Serbia) Vesna Nikolić
- Fitness coach: (Serbia) Srećko Mijatović
- Doctor: (Serbia) Nikola Marković
- Physiotherapist: (Serbia) Aleksandar Stanojević
- Physiotherapist: (Serbia) Ana Gavrić
- Masseur: (Serbia) Bojana Prodanović
Stručni štab:
Medicinski tim:

=== Management ===
As of 22 July 2026

Administration
- President: (Serbia) Darko Matić
- General director: (Serbia) Ivana Đorđević
- General secretary: (Serbia) Branko Matić
- Technical secretary: (Serbia) Dragan Đokić
- Secretary of the expert staff: (Serbia) Duško Ljubičić
- Sporting director: (Slovenia) Žiga Ribič
Uprava:

== Notable players ==
This is a list of players who have played at full international level.

- (The Gambia) Edrissa Ceesay
- (Serbia) Nikola Beljić
- (Serbia) Boško Janković
- (Serbia) Dragan Mrđa
- (Serbia) Radosav Petrović
- (Serbia) Ivan Radovanović
- (Serbia) Veseljko Trivunović
- (Serbia) Đorđe Tutorić
- (Serbia and Montenegro) (Serbia) Dušan Basta
- (Serbia and Montenegro) (Serbia) Nenad Kovačević
- (Serbia and Montenegro) (Serbia) Aleksandar Luković
- (Tanzania) Said Khamis

For a list of all FK Jedinstvo Ub players with a Wikipedia article, see Category:FK Jedinstvo Ub players.

== Managerial history ==
Period	Name
	(Serbia and Montenegro) Dragan Lacmanović
	(Serbia and Montenegro) Miodrag Radanović
	(Serbia and Montenegro) Nebojša Maksimović
	(Serbia and Montenegro) Radovan Đurđević
	(Serbia and Montenegro) Milan Milanović
	(Serbia and Montenegro) Dragan Lacmanović
	(Serbia) Vojimir Sinđić
	(Serbia) Branko Zujalović
	(Serbia) Vojimir Sinđić

Period	Name
2012–2014	(Serbia) Žarko Jovanović
2014–2015	(Serbia) Srđan Jovanović
2015–2016	(Serbia) Žarko Jovanović
2016–2017	(Serbia) Žarko Anđić
2017–2018	(Serbia) Veroljub Dukanac
2018–2019	(Serbia) Miloš Obradović
2019–2020	(Serbia) Srđa Knežević
2020–2023	(Serbia) Miloš Obradović
2023	(Serbia) Aleksandar Kristić
2023	(Serbia) Žarko Jovanović
2023–2024	(Serbia) Ivan Radovanović
