= Goran Luković =

Serbian footballer

Personal information
- Full name: Goran Luković
- Date of birth: 5 November 1978 (age 48)
- Place of birth: Gornji Milanovac, SFR Yugoslavia
- Height: 1.82 m (6 ft 0 in)
- Position: Midfielder

Team information
- Current team: Metalac Gornji Milanovac (manager)

Senior career*
Years	Team	Apps	(Gls)
1997–1999	Napredak Kruševac	7	(0)
1999–2001	Metalac Gornji Milanovac	54	(1)
2001–2003	Napredak Kruševac	52	(5)
2003–2005	Železnik	13	(0)
2004	→ Borac Čačak (loan)	14	(0)
2005–2006	Metalac Gornji Milanovac	14	(2)
2006–2008	Mladost Lučani	49	(0)
2008–2012	Javor Ivanjica	83	(2)
2012–2016	Metalac Gornji Milanovac	94	(7)
Total		380	(17)

Managerial career
- 2024-: Metalac Gornji Milanovac
- * Club domestic league appearances and goals

Goran Luković (Serbian Cyrillic: Горан Луковић; born 5 November 1978) is a Serbian retired footballer.

He was appointed head coach of hometown club Metalac Gornji Milanovac in September 2024, replacing Vladimir Otašević in the hot seat.
