= Mentor Miftari =

Kosovo Albanian coach and former footballer

Personal information
- Date of birth: 4 April 1971 (age 55)
- Place of birth: Kosovska Mitrovica, SFR Yugoslavia
- Height: 1.80 m (5 ft 11 in)
- Position: Defender

Youth career
- –1988: Minatori'89
- 1988–1989: Novi Pazar

Senior career*
Years	Team	Apps	(Gls)
1989–1995	Sloga Jugomagnat		
1995–1999	Erzgebirge Aue	65	(5)
1999–2000	VFC Plauen	15	(2)
2000–2002	SV Babelsberg 03	60	(2)
2002–2003	VfL Osnabrück	5	(0)
2003–2004	VfB Leipzig	17	(0)
2004–2005	Hallescher FC	31	(1)
2005	SV Yeşilyurt	9	(0)

Managerial career
- 2010–2012: KEK
- 2015–2016: Hajvalia
- 2016: KEK
- 2016–2017: Prishtina (assistant)
- * Club domestic league appearances and goals

Mentor Miftari (born 4 April 1971) is a Kosovo Albanian coach and former footballer who played as a defender mostly in Germany.

== Playing career ==
=== Early career ===
Miftari was part of the youth teams of Minatori'89 and Novi Pazar.

=== Professional career ===
He came to FC Erzgebirge Aue in 1995 from FK Sloga Jugomagnat, which at that time played in the Regionalliga Nordost. After 4 years at Aue, the defender moved within the league, first to VFC Plauen for a year and then to SV Babelsberg 03. Babelsberg had qualified for the newly introduced two-tier regional league. And although the team was still considered to be relegated before the season, Miftari and his team even managed to get promoted to the 2. Bundesliga. After relegation, he moved to VfL Osnabrück, with whom he finished second in the Regionalliga at the end of the season. However, Miftari did not follow Osnabrück into the second league and went to VfB Leipzig in the fourth league. Leipzig played their last season under this name and were then dissolved due to pending insolvency proceedings. He then went to former league rivals Hallescher FC, where he played for one season. Mentor Miftari ended his active career at the age of 34 at SV Yeşilyurt. As before in Babelsberg, Halle and Leipzig, his coach there was again German Andrejew.

== Coaching career ==
Miftari coached the Kosovan teams KEK and Hajvalia.

From 2016 until 2017, he was the assistant of the German coach Lutz Lindemann at Prishtina.
