= Slavenko Kuzeljević =

Serbian football manager and player

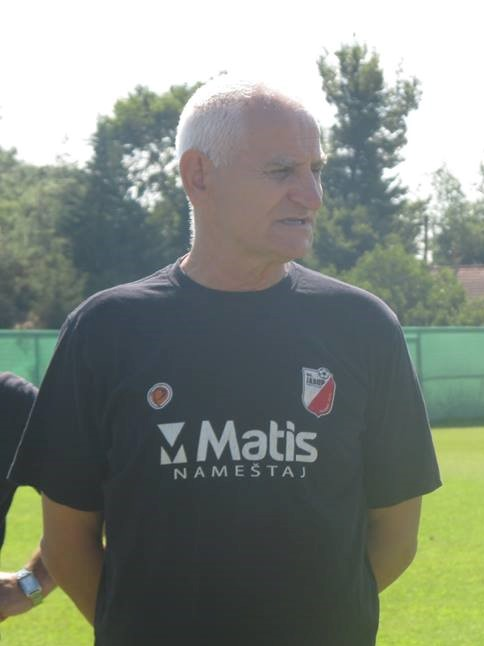
- Kuzeljević with Javor Ivanjica in 2014

Personal information
- Date of birth: 20 April 1958 (age 68)
- Place of birth: Priboj, PR Serbia, FPR Yugoslavia
- Position: Defender

Team information
- Current team: Metalac Gornji Milanovac (consultant)

Youth career
- 1972–1977: FAP

Senior career*
| Years | Team | Apps | (Gls) |
| 1977–1980 | FAP | 18+ | (0+) |
| 1981 | Budućnost Titograd | 9 | (0) |
| 1982–1987 | Sutjeska Nikšić | 174 | (13) |
| 1987–1988 | Priština | 30 | (1) |
| 1988–1992 | Sutjeska Nikšić | 131 | (2) |
| Total | | 362+ | (16+) |

Managerial career
- 1993–1995: Javor Ivanjica
- 1995–1996: Jedinstvo Paraćin
- 1996–1997: Priština
- 1997–1999: Bane
- 1999–2000: Borac Čačak
- 2000–2002: Hajduk Kula
- 2003: Sutjeska Nikšić
- 2005–2009: Metalac Gornji Milanovac
- 2009–2010: Banat Zrenjanin
- 2011–2012: Radnički Kragujevac
- 2012–2013: Novi Pazar
- 2013: Metalac Gornji Milanovac
- 2014–2015: Javor Ivanjica
- 2016: Jagodina
- * Club domestic league appearances and goals

Slavenko Kuzeljević (Serbian Cyrillic: Славенко Кузељевић; born 20 April 1958) is a Serbian football manager and former player.

== Playing career ==
Born in Priboj, Kuzeljević started out at his hometown club FAP, making his senior debut in 1977. He was transferred to Budućnost Titograd in 1981. Later on, Kuzeljević would go on to spend the majority of his career with Sutjeska Nikšić in two spells, making over 300 league appearances for the club.

== Managerial career ==
During his managerial career, Kuzeljević worked at numerous clubs in Serbia and Montenegro, most notably with Hajduk Kula (2000–2002), Metalac Gornji Milanovac (2005–2009), and Radnički Kragujevac (July 2011–October 2012). He subsequently took charge of Serbian SuperLiga club Novi Pazar in December 2012.

== Honours ==
Metalac Gornji Milanovac

- Serbian League West: 2006–07
