= Vladimir Otašević =

Serbian footballer

Personal information
- Full name: Vladimir Otašević
- Date of birth: 8 June 1986 (age 40)
- Place of birth: Nova Varoš, SR Serbia, SFR Yugoslavia
- Height: 1.90 m (6 ft 3 in)
- Position: Centre-back

Senior career*
Years	Team	Apps	(Gls)
2004–2011	Metalac Gornji Milanovac	207	(8)
2011–2012	Spartak Subotica	29	(0)
2013	Radnički Kragujevac	19	(1)
2014	Novi Pazar	14	(1)
2015	Mladost Lučani	13	(0)
2015–2017	Metalac Gornji Milanovac	58	(4)
2017–2019	Borac Čačak	39	(3)
2019–2020	Spartak Subotica	38	(3)
2020	Javor Ivanjica	11	(1)

Managerial career
- 2020–2021: Radnički Niš (assistant)
- 2021–2022: Spartak Subotica (assistant)
- 2021–2023: Serbia U-17 (assistant)
- 2023–: Serbia U-18 (assistant)
- 2023–2024: Metalac Gornji Milanovac
- * Club domestic league appearances and goals

Vladimir Otašević (Serbian Cyrillic: Владимир Оташевић; born 8 June 1986) is a Serbian retired football defender and most recently manager of Metalac Gornji Milanovac.

== Club career ==
He was playing for Metalac Gornji Milanovac from 2004 to 2011 and he played on 207 league matches in 3 different leagues.

In 2011, he signed for Spartak Subotica, and stayed in club for season and half. Then, he left to Radnički Kragujevac.

He joined Radnički Kragujevac in 2013. After a year in club, he broke the contract and left the club.

He signed for Novi Pazar in 2014. At the beginning of season 2014–15 he injured after one duel on the match versus his previous club, Radnički Kragujevac.

After ended contract with Novi Pazar, he signed with Mladost Lučani. He made 13 league appearances for Mladost Lučani in 2015.

Otašević returned to Metalac Gornji Milanovac in summer 2015.

== Coaching career ==
In October 2020, Otašević was hired as assistant coach at FK Radnički Niš. Ahead of the 2021-22 season, he was hired as assistant coach at Spartak Subotica.

On 24 October 2023, Otašević was announced as the new manager of his former club, Serbian First League side Metalac Gornji Milanovac.

== Career statistics ==
Club performance			League		Cup		Continental		Total	
Season	Club	League	Apps	Goals	Apps	Goals	Apps	Goals	Apps	Goals
2004–05	Metalac Gornji Milanovac	Serbian League West	29	1	0	0	0	0	29	1
2005–06	Metalac Gornji Milanovac	Serbian League West	29	0	0	0	0	0	29	0
2006–07	Metalac Gornji Milanovac	Serbian League West	31	1	0	0	0	0	31	1
2007–08	Metalac Gornji Milanovac	Serbian First League	30	1	0	0	0	0	30	1
2008–09	Metalac Gornji Milanovac	Serbian First League	31	3	0	0	0	0	31	3
2009–10	Metalac Gornji Milanovac	Serbian SuperLiga	29	0	0	0	0	0	29	0
2010–11	Metalac Gornji Milanovac	Serbian SuperLiga	28	2	1	1	0	0	29	3
2011–12	Spartak Subotica	Serbian SuperLiga	27	0	3	0	0	0	30	0
2012–13	Spartak Subotica	Serbian SuperLiga	2	0	0	0	0	0	2	0
2012–13	Radnički 1923	Serbian SuperLiga	15	1	1	0	0	0	16	1
2013–14	Radnički 1923	Serbian SuperLiga	4	0	0	0	0	0	4	0
2013–14	Novi Pazar	Serbian SuperLiga	12	1	0	0	0	0	12	1
2014–15	Novi Pazar	Serbian SuperLiga	2	0	0	0	0	0	2	0
2014–15	Mladost Lučani	Serbian SuperLiga	13	0	0	0	0	0	13	0
2015–16	Metalac Gornji Milanovac	Serbian SuperLiga	31	2	0	0	0	0	31	2
2016–17	Metalac Gornji Milanovac	Serbian SuperLiga	27	2	0	0	0	0	19	2
2017–18	Borac Čačak	Serbian SuperLiga	18	0	1	0	0	0	19	0
2018–19	Borac Čačak	Serbian First League	21	3	2	0	0	0	23	3
2018–19	Spartak Subotica	Serbian SuperLiga	0	0	0	0	0	0	0	0
Career total			379	17	8	1	0	0	387	18
