= Zarija Lambulić =

Serbian footballer

Personal information
- Full name: Zarija Lambulić
- Date of birth: 25 May 1998 (age 28)
- Place of birth: Peć, FR Yugoslavia
- Height: 1.93 m (6 ft 4 in)
- Position: Centre-back

Team information
- Current team: Tekstilac Odžaci
- Number: 25

Youth career
- Brodarac

Senior career*
Years	Team	Apps	(Gls)
2017–2019	Proleter Novi Sad	44	(1)
2019–2020	Shakhtyor Soligorsk	4	(0)
2020	→ Zrinjski Mostar (loan)	1	(0)
2021	Zlatibor Čajetina	11	(0)
2021–2022	Mladost Lučani	4	(0)
2021–2022	→ Proleter Novi Sad (loan)	10	(0)
2022	Mladost Novi Sad	0	(0)
2023	Beroe	11	(0)
2023–2024	FK IMT	31	(0)
2024	Budućnost Podgorica	1	(0)
2025–	Tekstilac Odžaci	12	(0)

International career
2016–2017	Serbia U19	5	(1)
2018	Serbia U21	2	(0)
- * Club domestic league appearances and goals as of 2 November 2024

Zarija Lambulić (Serbian Cyrillic: Зарија Ламбулић; born 25 May 1998) is a Serbian professional footballer who plays as a centre-back for Tekstilac Odžaci.

== Club career ==
=== Proleter Novi Sad ===
Born in Peć, Lambulić passed the youth academy of football club Brodarac, being a member of the generation which won Serbian youth league for the 2016–17 campaign. After overgrown youth selections, Lambulić moved in Proleter Novi Sad in summer 2017. After two opening matches he spent as a reserve sitting on the bench, he made his official debut in the 3rd fixture game of the 2017–18 Serbian First League season, replacing Danilo Nikolić in 24 minute of the match against Radnički Pirot on 3 September 2017. Several days later, he signed his first three-year professional contract with the club. He scored his first senior goal in 2–0 home victory over Radnički Kragujevac on 11 November 2017. Lambulić collected 12 Serbian First League appearances at total until the end of 2017, missing the last fixture match of the first half-season due to injury. Lambulić was also elected in top 11 Serbian First League footballers for the first half-season. During the spring half-season, Lambulić played 2 matches under Nenad Vanić, both as a back-up player. Winning the top place in the Serbian First League for the 2017–18 campaign, Lambulić made a promotion to the top tier with Proleter. He made his Serbian SuperLiga debut in opening match of the 2018–19 season, against Radnički Niš at the Čair Stadium, on 22 July 2018.

On 4 January 2023, Lambulić signed for First League club Beroe.

== International career ==
Lambulić got his first call into the Serbian under-19 selection in late 2016. He made his debut for the team in a friendly match against Italy on 14 December 2017 under coach Milan Kosanović. Lambulić scored his first goal in 3–3 draw to Bosnia and Herzegovina on 9 March 2017. He also made a single appearance in the elite qualification round, failing to qualify to 2017 UEFA European Under-19 Championship.

== Playing style ==
Lambulić is a right-legged defender, who usually operates as a centre-back. Playing with Brodarac, Lambulić promoted as one of the defenders in the youth league with the best prospects, and also called into the national under-19 team. As a 1.93 m tall player, he is labelled as dominant in positioning, having good heading abilities respectively. While in youth, Lambulić has also affirmed as a free kick taker.

== Career statistics ==
=== Club ===
As of 28 March 2018

Appearances and goals by club, season and competition
Club	Season	League			Cup		Continental		Other		Total	
Club	Season	Division	Apps	Goals	Apps	Goals	Apps	Goals	Apps	Goals	Apps	Goals
Proleter Novi Sad	2017–18	Serbian First League	14	1	0	0	—		—		14	1
Proleter Novi Sad	2018–19	Serbian SuperLiga	2	0	0	0	—		—		2	0
Proleter Novi Sad	Total		16	1	0	0	—		—		16	1

== Honours ==
Proleter Novi Sad

- Serbian First League: 2017–18
