= Zoran Ćirić (footballer) =

Serbian football manager and player

Personal information
- Date of birth: 27 June 1973 (age 53)
- Place of birth: Odžaci, SR Serbia, SFR Yugoslavia
- Position: Forward

Youth career
- Radnički Ratkovo

Senior career*
Years	Team	Apps	(Gls)
1994–1997	Bečej	81	(24)
1997–1998	Partizan	6	(1)
1998–1999	Anorthosis	0	(0)
2000	Apollon Smyrnis	16	(1)
2000–2005	Mladost Apatin		
2005–2006	ČSK Čelarevo		
2006–2007	Tekstilac Odžaci		

Managerial career
- 2010: Tekstilac Odžaci
- 2012–2013: Tekstilac Odžaci
- 2014: Tekstilac Odžaci
- 2014–2016: Senta
- 2016–2017: ČSK Čelarevo (assistant)
- 2017: Bratstvo Prigrevica
- 2017–2018: Bačka 1901
- 2019: Hajduk 1912
- 2020: Tekstilac Odžaci
- 2021–2022: Senta
- 2022: Radnički Ratkovo
- * Club domestic league appearances and goals

Zoran Ćirić (Serbian Cyrillic: Зоран Ћирић; born 27 June 1973) is a Serbian football manager and former player.

== Playing career ==
After spending three seasons at Bečej, Ćirić was signed by Partizan in the summer of 1997. He later played professionally in Cyprus and Greece.

== Managerial career ==
After hanging up his boots, Ćirić served as manager of Tekstilac Odžaci on several occasions. He was also manager of Bačka 1901.

== Career statistics ==
Club	Season	League	
Club	Season	Apps	Goals
Bečej	1994–95	24	7
Bečej	1995–96	34	9
Bečej	1996–97	23	8
Bečej	Total	81	24
