= Saudin Huseinović =

Serbian football manager and player

Personal information
- Date of birth: 19 December 1971 (age 54)
- Place of birth: Novi Pazar, SR Serbia, SFR Yugoslavia
- Position: Forward

Senior career*
Years	Team	Apps	(Gls)
1993–1994	Novi Pazar		
1995–1997	Borac Čačak	72	(17)
1998–1999	Rad	45	(9)
2000	Čukarički	14	(1)
2001–2002	Koper	29	(15)
2002	Korotan Prevalje	9	(5)
2003–2004	Novi Pazar		
Total		169+	(47+)

Managerial career
- 2008: Novi Pazar
- 2008–2009: Novi Pazar
- 2017: Novi Pazar (caretaker)
- * Club domestic league appearances and goals

Saudin Huseinović (Serbian Cyrillic: Саудин Хусеиновић; born 19 December 1971) is a Serbian football manager and former player.

== Playing career ==
Huseinović played for Novi Pazar in the Second League of FR Yugoslavia, before joining First League club Borac Čačak in the 1995 winter transfer window. He later spent some time at Rad and Čukarički.

In the 2001 winter transfer window, Huseinović moved abroad to Slovenia to play for Koper, spending one and a half seasons with the club. He also briefly played for Korotan Prevalje, before returning to Novi Pazar.

== Managerial career ==
After hanging up his boots, Huseinović served as manager of Novi Pazar on several occasions.
