= Seven (brand) =

Indian lifestyle brand

- Product type: Lifestyle brand (casual & sportswear)
- Current owner: Fila (51%)
- Country: India
- Introduced: February 2016; 10 years ago
- Markets: Global
- Previous owners: Punit Kaswan
- Ambassador: MS Dhoni
- Tagline: A brand by MS Dhoni
- Website: http://www.7.life/sf/

SEVEN is an Indian lifestyle brand that manufactures and markets casual and sportswear clothing and footwear. It was launched in February 2016 by Indian cricketer and former captain of the Indian national cricket team, Mahendra Singh Dhoni and RS Seven Lifestyle.

In January 2026, the South Korean brand Fila completed the purchase of a controlling stake (51%) in Seven Spa, the company that owns the Indian brand, in an all-cash transaction valued at €26.8 million.

== Background ==
SEVEN was launched by RS Seven Lifestyle (owned by Rhiti Group) and MS Dhoni on 19 February 2016 in New Delhi. Dhoni is the brand ambassador of SEVEN and also owns footwear side of the business.

Originally launched as a lifestyle brand with plans for sportswear, both clothing and footwear, its clothing and fashion accessory side is controlled by RS Seven Lifestyle (RSSL), while the footwear side is owned by MS Dhoni, which has a licensing agreement with RSSL.

It was reported that ₹150 crore (US$16 million) to ₹200 crore (US$21 million) were spent by investors in development and distributions of the brand. Its products are manufactured in India, China and Vietnam.

=== Brand name ===
The brand name SEVEN coincides with the ODI and T20 shirt number of MS Dhoni. SEVEN is the official kit sponsor of Chennai Super Kings in IPL and Joburg Super Kings in SA20 and Texas Super Kings in Major Cricket League

=== Sponsorship ===
It previously has sponsored I-League 2nd Division side ARA FC, based in Ahmedabad.

== Distribution and stores ==
SEVEN has fifteen distributors in India. It also has distributors in the United States and in the Middle East. Flipkart is the official e-commerce partner of the brand. The brand is available at more than 300 multi-brand retail stores in India. On 20 July 2017, the first outlet of SEVEN was launched in Dhoni's hometown Ranchi.
