= Vladica Petrović =

Serbian football manager and player

Personal information
- Full name: Vladica Petrović
- Date of birth: 23 December 1970 (age 55)
- Place of birth: Osečina, SR Serbia, SFR Yugoslavia

Team information
- Current team: AEZ Zakakiou (manager)

Youth career
- Loznica

Senior career*
Years	Team	Apps	(Gls)
- Budućnost Valjevo
- Obilić
1995	Loznica	16	(2)
1995	Nacional	6	(0)
1995–1996	Vianense	16	(6)
1996	Tirsense	2	(0)
1997	Budućnost Valjevo	17	(5)
- Ethnikos Piraeus

Managerial career
- Železničar Lajkovac
- 2012: Metalac Gornji Milanovac
- 2012–2013: Metalac Gornji Milanovac
- 2013: Budućnost Valjevo
- 2013: Mladost Lučani
- 2014: Železničar Lajkovac
- 2014–2015: Metalac Gornji Milanovac
- 2015: Drina Zvornik
- 2015: Irakleio
- 2016: Osečina
- 2017: Loznica
- 2018: Novi Pazar
- 2019: Novi Pazar
- 2019–2020: Aiolikos
- 2021: Budućnost Krušik 2014
- 2021: Budućnost Dobanovci
- 2022–2023: Metalac Gornji Milanovac
- 2024–: AEZ Zakakiou
- * Club domestic league appearances and goals

Vladica Petrović (Serbian Cyrillic: Владица Петровић; born 23 December 1970) is a Serbian football manager and former player.

== Playing career ==
After playing for Loznica in the First League of FR Yugoslavia, Petrović moved abroad in 1995. He went on to have short spells at three clubs in the lower leagues of Portugal football, before returning to his homeland and rejoining Budućnost Valjevo. Later on, Petrović also played professionally in Greece.

== Managerial career ==
After hanging up his boots, Petrović served as manager of Metalac Gornji Milanovac on several occasions. He also worked at Drina Zvornik of the Premier League of Bosnia and Herzegovina.

In December 2019, Petrović took charge of Greek club Aiolikos. He left in October 2020.
