= Miloš Obradović =

Serbian footballer

Personal information
- Date of birth: 30 March 1987 (age 39)
- Place of birth: Ub, SFR Yugoslavia
- Height: 1.82 m (6 ft 0 in)
- Position: Left-back

Youth career
- Borac Čačak

Senior career*
Years	Team	Apps	(Gls)
2005–2007	Red Star Belgrade	0	(0)
2005	→ Bečej (loan)	1	(0)
2006	→ Sopot (loan)	10	(0)
2006	→ Palić (loan)	13	(0)
2007	→ Spartak Subotica (loan)	12	(0)
2007–2008	Palilulac Beograd	23	(5)
2008–2009	Borac Čačak	1	(0)
2008–2010	Mladost Lučani	23	(2)
2009	→ Metalac Gornji Milanovac (loan)	12	(0)
2010–2012	União de Leiria	8	(0)
2013	Nitra	7	(1)
2013	Novi Pazar	5	(1)
2014	OFK Beograd	9	(0)
2014	Voždovac	4	(0)
2015–2017	Rad	41	(0)

Managerial career
- 2018–2019: Jedinstvo Ub
- 2020–2023: Jedinstvo Ub
- 2023: Metalac Gornji Milanovac
- 2024: Jedinstvo Ub
- * Club domestic league appearances and goals

Miloš Obradović (Serbian Cyrillic: Милош Обрадовић; born 30 March 1987) is a Serbian retired footballer and current sporting director of Jedinstvo Ub.
