= Nermin Useni =

Serbian footballer

Personal information
- Full name: Nermin Useni
- Date of birth: 13 March 1980 (age 46)
- Place of birth: Prizren, SFR Yugoslavia
- Height: 1.73 m (5 ft 8 in)
- Position: Midfielder

Senior career*
Years	Team	Apps	(Gls)
2001–2002	Javor Ivanjica	30	(0)
2003	Radnički Obrenovac	12	(0)
2004–2005	Radnički Beograd	35	(4)
2006	Hajduk Kula	5	(0)
2006	Mladenovac	16	(2)
2007–2008	Mladost Lučani	28	(3)
2008–2011	Rudar Pljevlja	79	(6)
2012	Mladost Lučani	26	(0)
Total		231	(15)

Managerial career
- 2024: Mladost Lučani (caretaker)
- 2024: Mladost Lučani (caretaker)
- * Club domestic league appearances and goals

Nermin Useni (Serbian Cyrillic: Нермин Усени; born 13 March 1980) is a Serbian former professional footballer who played as a midfielder.

== Honours ==
Mladost Lučani

- Serbian First League: 2006–07

Rudar Pljevlja

- Montenegrin First League: 2009–10
- Montenegrin Cup: 2009–10, 2010–11
