= Miodrag Radanović =

Serbian football manager

Personal information
- Full name: Miodrag Radanović
- Date of birth: 2 October 1947 (age 79)
- Place of birth: Belgrade, FPR Yugoslavia

Managerial career
- Years: Team
- 1998: Rubin Kazan (caretaker)
- 2001–2002: Leotar
- 2002: Jedinstvo Ub
- 2003–2004: Red Star Belgrade (assistant)
- 2008: Lovćen
- 2009: Rudar Pljevlja
- 2010: BSK Borča
- 2010–2011: Metalac Gornji Milanovac
- 2012: Banat Zrenjanin
- 2013: BSK Borča
- 2015: Kukësi
- 2015: Dinamo Vranje
- 2015: OFK Beograd
- 2020: Igalo

Miodrag Radanović (Serbian Cyrillic: Миодраг Радановић; born 2 October 1947) is a Serbian football manager.

== Career ==
Radanović served as manager of several Serbian SuperLiga and Serbian First League clubs, such as BSK Borča (two spells), Metalac Gornji Milanovac (November 2010–April 2011), Banat Zrenjanin (June–September 2012), Dinamo Vranje (September–October 2015), and OFK Beograd (November–December 2015). He also managed clubs in Russia, Bosnia and Herzegovina, Montenegro, and Albania.

== Honours ==
Leotar

- First League of the Republika Srpska: 2001–02
- Republika Srpska Cup: 2001–02
