= Slavko Matić =

Serbian footballer and manager (born 1976)

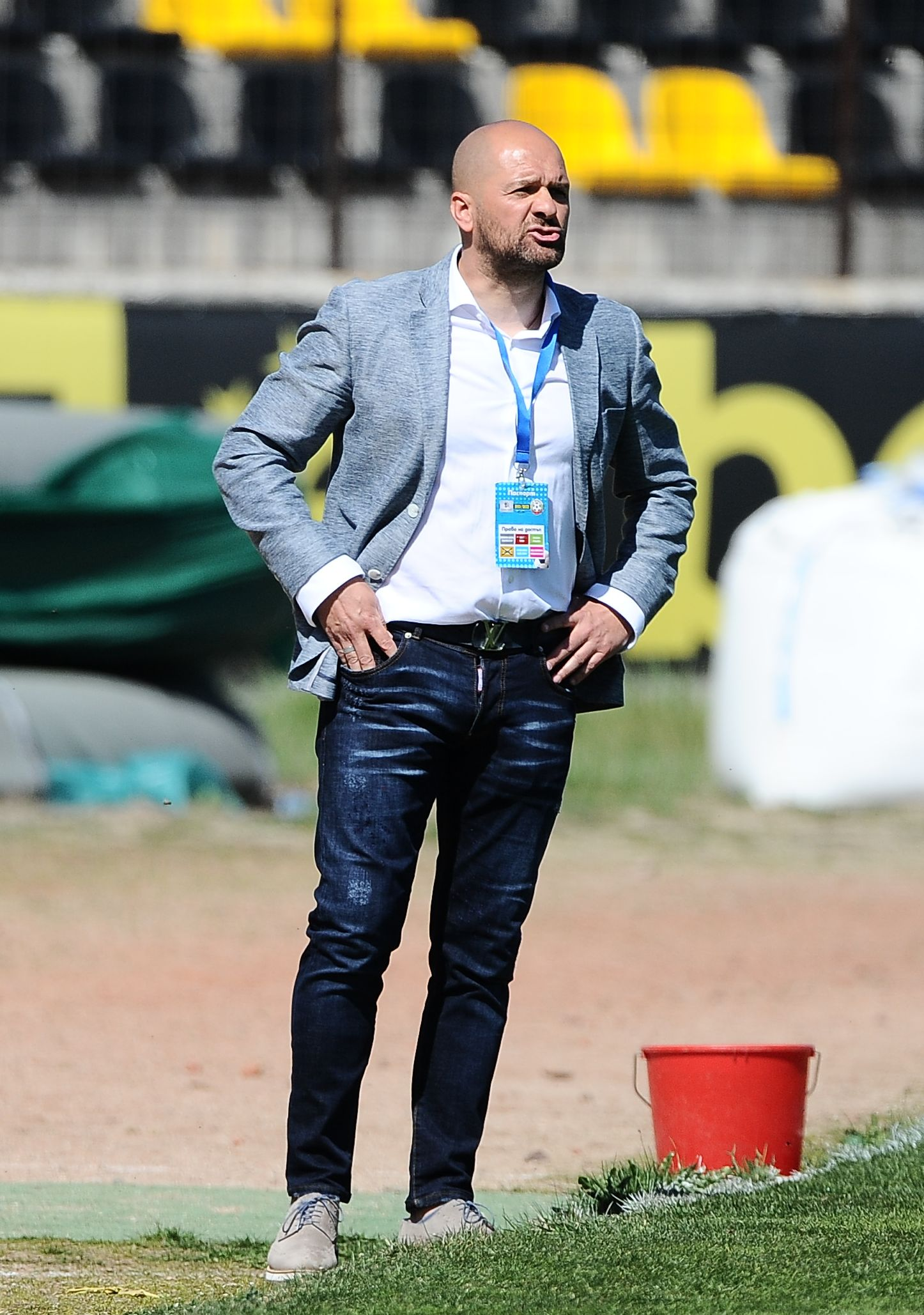

Personal information
- Date of birth: 2 July 1976 (age 50)
- Place of birth: Obrenovac, SR Serbia, Yugoslavia
- Height: 1.77 m (5 ft 10 in)
- Position: Defender

Youth career
- Partizan

Senior career*
| Years | Team | Apps | (Gls) |
| 1996–1998 | Čukarički | 15 | (0) |
| 1998–2001 | OFK Beograd | 36+ | (0+) |
| 2001–2002 | Spartak Moscow | 0 | (0) |
| 2002–2003 | Čukarički | 8 | (0) |
| 2003–2004 | Slavia Sofia | 25 | (1) |
| 2004–2005 | Pegah Gilan | | |
| 2005–2006 | CSKA Sofia | 10 | (0) |

International career
- FR Yugoslavia U21

Managerial career
- 2010–2014: Al-Ahli (B team)
- 2015: Napredak Kruševac
- 2015: Zavrč
- 2015–2016: Koper
- 2016: Zavrč
- 2016: OFK Beograd
- 2017: Al-Shamal
- 2019: Novi Pazar
- 2019: Budućnost Dobanovci
- 2020: Nantong Zhiyun (assistant)
- 2020: Henan Jianye (assistant)
- 2020: Sloboda Užice
- 2020: Al-Nojoom
- 2021: Arda Kardzhali
- 2022: Septemvri Sofia
- 2022–2023: Accra Hearts of Oak
- 2024: Novi Pazar
- 2024–2025: Tekstilac Odžaci
- 2025: TSC
- 2025: Radnički Niš
- 2025–2026: Septemvri Sofia
- 2026: Radnički 1923
- * Club domestic league appearances and goals

Slavko Matić (Serbian Cyrillic: Славко Матић; born 2 July 1976) is a Serbian football manager.

He is a holder of the UEFA Pro Licence.

He played for OFK Beograd, Spartak Moscow, Slavia Sofia and CSKA Sofia

Slavko Matić won the Bulgarian Second League (Vtora Liga) title with Septemvri Sofia in the 2021–22 season.
