= Dragan Lacmanović =

Serbian football manager and player

Personal information
- Date of birth: 6 August 1954 (age 72)
- Place of birth: Benkovac, PR Croatia, FPR Yugoslavia
- Positions: Forward; defender

Youth career
- Velebit Benkovac

Senior career*
Years	Team	Apps	(Gls)
- Šibenik
1977–1982	Galenika Zemun	89	(19)
1983	Red Star Belgrade	2	(0)
1983	Galenika Zemun	16	(3)
1984	Footscray JUST	12	(2)
1985	Borac Banja Luka	12	(2)
1987	Kapfenberger SV		
1988–1991	Zemun	58	(20)

Managerial career
- 1994: Zemun
- Jedinstvo Paraćin
- 2000: Obilić
- 2003: Mogren
- 2003: Metalac Gornji Milanovac
- 2006: Jedinstvo Ub
- 2006: Zemun
- 2007: Zemun
- 2011: Čukarički
- 2011: Sutjeska Nikšić
- 2012: Metalac Gornji Milanovac
- 2013: Banat Zrenjanin
- 2017: BSK Borča
- * Club domestic league appearances and goals

Dragan Lacmanović (Serbian Cyrillic: Драган Лацмановић; born 6 August 1954) is a Serbian former football manager and player.

== Playing career ==
Lacmanović spent most of his career with Zemun, helping the club win promotion to the Yugoslav First League on two occasions, in 1982 and 1990. He also spent half a season with Red Star Belgrade, making two league appearances in 1982–83. In 1984, Lacmanović moved to Australia and played for National Soccer League side Footscray JUST.

== Managerial career ==
After hanging up his boots, Lacmanović was manager of Zemun on three occasions. He also served as manager of Obilić and Čukarički.
