= Jovan Lukić (footballer, born 1997) =

Serbian footballer

Personal information
- Date of birth: 29 September 1997 (age 29)
- Place of birth: Kragujevac, FR Yugoslavia
- Height: 1.80 m (5 ft 11 in)
- Position: Midfielder

Team information
- Current team: Srbija Ilićevo

Youth career
- Radnički Kragujevac

Senior career*
Years	Team	Apps	(Gls)
2015–2019	Radnički Kragujevac	91	(12)
2019	Novi Pazar	0	(0)
2019–2020	Borac Čačak		
2020–2021	Sloga Požega		
2021–2022	Real Podunavci		
2022	Takovo		
2023-	Srbija Ilićevo		
- * Club domestic league appearances and goals as of 22:20, 6 October 2019 (UTC)

Jovan Lukić (Serbian Cyrillic: Јован Лукић; born 22 September 1997) is a Serbian footballer who plays as a midfielder for Srbija Ilićevo.

== Career ==
On 28 June 2019, Lukić signed with FK Novi Pazar. However, he ended up joining FK Borac Čačak one month later.

== Honours ==
Radnički Kragujevac

- Serbian League West: 2016–17
