= Neško Milovanović =

Serbian football manager and player

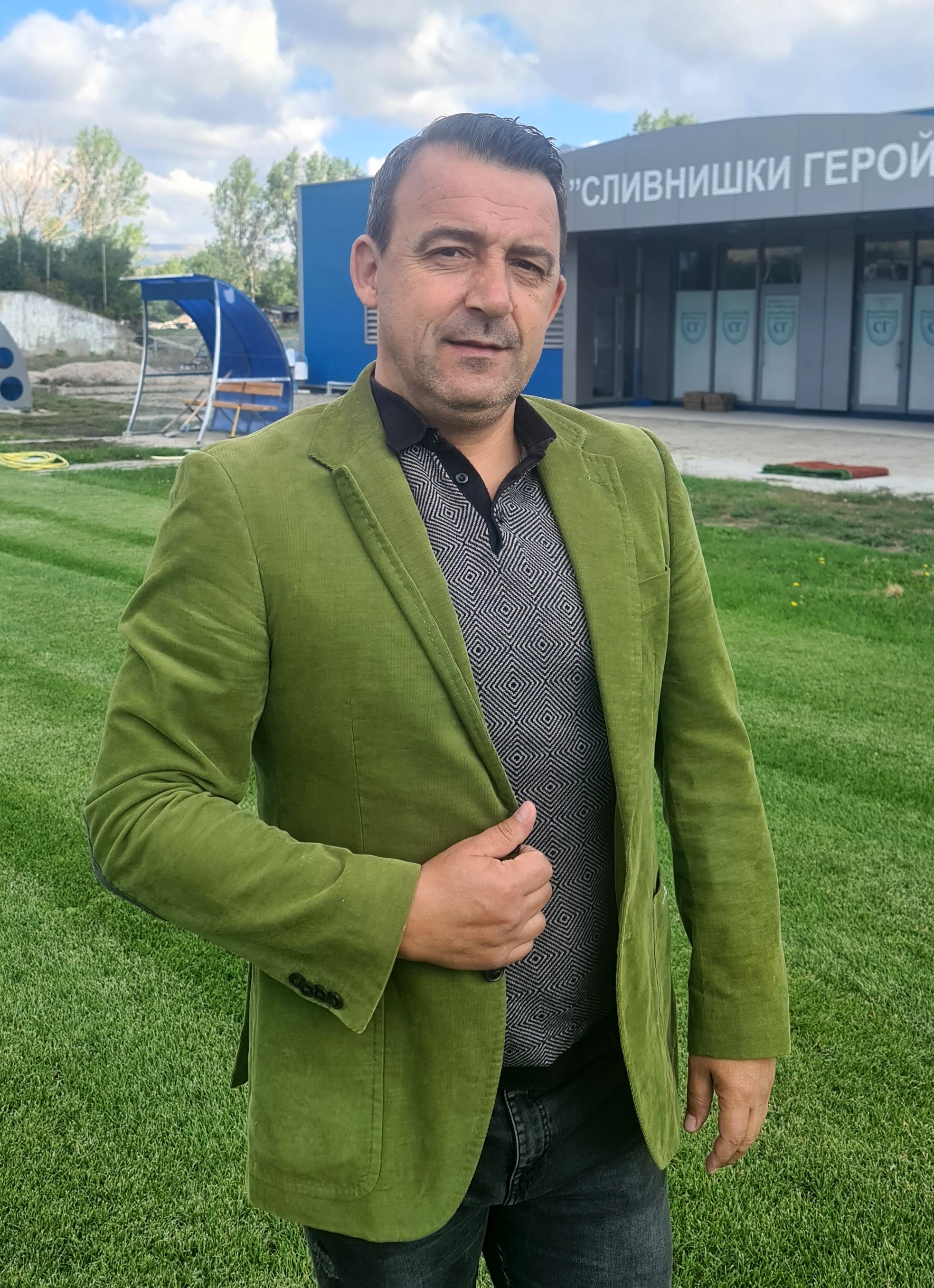
- Milovanović in 2022

Personal information
- Full name: Neško Milovanović
- Date of birth: 4 December 1974 (age 51)
- Place of birth: Čačak, SR Serbia, SFR Yugoslavia
- Height: 1.75 m (5 ft 9 in)
- Position: Forward

Youth career
- Borac Čačak

Senior career*
Years	Team	Apps	(Gls)
1995–1997	Borac Čačak	36	(5)
1996–1997	Baltimore Spirit (indoor)	21	(14)
1997–1998	Radnički Kragujevac	33	(9)
1999	Milicionar	7	(1)
1999	Obilić	2	(1)
1999	Belasitsa Petrich	10	(5)
2000–2001	Levski Sofia	17	(1)
2001	→ Shanghai Shenhua (loan)	13	(1)
2002	Sanfrecce Hiroshima	8	(0)
2003–2004	Lokomotiv Plovdiv	19	(4)
2004–2005	Radnički Kragujevac	28	(18)
2005	Olympiacos Volos	11	(0)
2006	Panserraikos	9	(1)
2006–2007	Borac Čačak	28	(4)
2007	Sliema Wanderers	9	(1)
2008	Radnički Niš	12	(1)
2008	Sloboda Čačak		
Total		263+	(66+)

Managerial career
- 2010–2011: Polet Ljubić
- 2011: Metalac Gornji Milanovac (assistant)
- 2011: Metalac Gornji Milanovac (caretaker)
- 2012: Metalac Gornji Milanovac
- 2012: Mladost Lučani
- 2013: Sloga Kraljevo
- 2014: Radnik Surdulica
- 2014–2015: Radnički 1923
- 2016: Radnik Surdulica
- 2017: Novi Pazar
- 2018: OFK Vršac
- 2019: Novi Pazar
- 2019: Sloga 33
- 2020: Šumadija Aranđelovac
- 2021: Sloga Kraljevo
- 2022–2023: Slivnishki Geroy
- * Club domestic league appearances and goals

Neško Milovanović (Serbian Cyrillic: Нешко Миловановић; born 4 December 1974) is a Serbian football manager and former player.

== Playing career ==
During his journeyman career, Milovanović played as a forward for many clubs in his homeland, most notably Borac Čačak and Radnički Kragujevac, and six other countries, winning the Bulgarian league titles with both Levski Sofia (2000) and Lokomotiv Plovdiv (2004). He also played indoor soccer with the Baltimore Spirit of the National Professional Soccer League.

== Managerial career ==
After hanging up his boots, Milovanović was manager of numerous clubs in his native country, having two spells at both Radnik Surdulica and Novi Pazar.

In September 2022, Milovanović was appointed as manager of Bulgarian Third League club Slivnishki Geroy. He was dismissed from his position in March 2023.

== Personal life ==
Born in Trbušani, a village near Čačak, Milovanović also holds Bulgarian citizenship. He is the father of fellow footballer Vasilije Veljko Milovanović.

== Career statistics ==
Club	Season	League	
Club	Season	Apps	Goals
Borac Čačak	1995–96	24	5
Borac Čačak	1996–97	12	0
Borac Čačak	Total	36	5
Radnički Kragujevac	1997–98	22	6
Radnički Kragujevac	1998–99	11	3
Radnički Kragujevac	Total	33	9
Milicionar	1998–99	7	1
Obilić	1999–2000	2	1

== Honours ==
Levski Sofia

- Bulgarian A Group: 1999–2000
- Bulgarian Cup: 1999–2000

Lokomotiv Plovdiv

- Bulgarian A Group: 2003–04
- Bulgarian Supercup: 2004

Radnički Kragujevac

- Serbian League West: 2004–05
