= FK Metalac Gornji Milanovac =

Serbian football club

Metalac Gornji Milanovac
- Full name: Fudbalski Klub Metalac Gornji Milanovac
- Founded: 12 June 1961; 65 years ago
- Ground: Stadion Metalac
- Capacity: 4,500
- President: Aleksandar Marušić
- Head coach: Srđan Bugarski
- League: Serbian First League
- 2025–26: Serbian League West, 1st of 16 (promoted)
- Website: fkmetalac.rs
Home colours	Away colours

FK Metalac Gornji Milanovac (Serbian Cyrillic: ФК Металац Горњи Милановац) is a professional football club based in Gornji Milanovac, Serbia. They compete in the Serbian First League, the second tier of the national league system.

== History ==
The club was founded as FK Radnik on 12 June 1961. The initiative came from Miroslav Spasojević, a former FK Takovo player, and was backed by two local companies, Graditelj and Metalac. The club was immediately registered with the Čačak Football Subassociation and started competing in the local leagues. They would change their name to FK Metalac in 1965. The club made its first notable achievement by qualifying for the Yugoslav Cup in 1974, but lost away to Borac Travnik in the opening round.

In 1995, the club merged with FK Autoeksport, taking its spot in the Morava-Šumadija Zone League, the fourth tier of football in FR Yugoslavia. They would go on to earn promotion to the Serbian League Morava in 1997. However, the club suffered relegation from the third tier after just one season. After securing two consecutive promotions, they historically reached the Second League of FR Yugoslavia in 2000, but finished bottom of the table in their debut season in the second tier. The club subsequently won the Serbian League Morava in 2002 and would go on to play in the Second League until 2004.

After spending three seasons in the third tier, the club became the Serbian League West champions in 2007, gaining promotion to the Serbian First League. They played for two seasons in the second tier, placing fifth in the 2008–09 Serbian First League and earning promotion to the Serbian SuperLiga for the first time in their history. The club ended ninth in its debut appearance in the top flight. They spent two more seasons in the top tier, before finishing bottom of the table in 2012.

After narrowly missing promotion in 2014, the club managed to return to the top flight in 2015, defeating Napredak Kruševac in a two-legged playoff. They were relegated back to the First League after finishing second from the bottom in the 2016–17 Serbian SuperLiga. During the COVID-19-shortened 2019–20 season, the club placed fourth in the standings and was promoted to the SuperLiga for the third time.

== Honours ==
- Serbian League Morava/Serbian League West (tier III)
  - Champions (2): 2001–02, 2006–07

== Seasons ==
Season	League									Cup
Season	Division	Pld	W	D	L	GF	GA	Pts	Pos	Cup
Serbia and Montenegro
1997–98	3 – Morava	34	13	9	12	52	31	48	12th	—
1998–99	4 – Moravica	16 (Note: The season was cut short due to the NATO bombing of Yugoslavia.)	9	3	4	36	13	30	2nd	—
1999–2000	3 – Morava	38	22	12	4	66	24	78	2nd	—
2000–01	2 – West	34	9	6	19	39	66	33	18th	—
2001–02	3 – Morava	38	23	11	4	84	32	80	1st	—
2002–03	2 – West	33	13	12	8	31	27	51	6th	—
2003–04	2 – West	36	13	6	17	42	42	45	8th	—
2004–05	3 – West	34	13	8	13	41	32	47	7th	—
2005–06	3 – West	34	23	8	3	47	10	77	2nd	—
Serbia
2006–07	3 – West	34	21	10	3	45	17	73	1st	—
2007–08	2	34	13	10	11	33	26	49	6th	—
2008–09	2	34	15	10	9	38	30	55	5th	Round of 32
2009–10	1	30	10	5	15	24	39	35	9th	Round of 16
2010–11	1	30	8	5	17	21	38	29	14th	Round of 16
2011–12	1	30	2	9	19	14	48	15	16th	Round of 16
2012–13	2	34	17	5	12	48	32	56	5th	Round of 16
2013–14	2	30	15	7	8	34	14	52	3rd	Round of 32
2014–15	2	30	16	7	7	43	29	55	3rd	Round of 16
2015–16	1	37	10	15	12	41	48	28	11th	Round of 32
2016–17	1	37	8	10	19	27	43	21	15th	Round of 32
2017–18	2	30	17	6	7	43	21	57	3rd	Round of 32
2018–19	2	37	15	12	10	51	35	33	5th	Round of 32
2019–20	2	30 (Note: The season was shortened due to the COVID-19 pandemic in Serbia.)	16	5	9	41	34	53	4th	Round of 32
2020–21	1	38	13	13	12	48	53	52	9th	Round of 16
2021–22	1	37	8	9	20	42	65	33	15th	Quarter-finals
2022–23	2	37	12	12	13	42	42	48	12th	Round of 16
2023–24	2	37	11	12	14	32	38	45	11th	Round of 16
2024–25	3 - West	30	14	8	8	30	22	50	2nd	Preliminary Round

== Stadium ==
After playing home matches at various stadiums in Gornji Milanovac and other neighboring cities for years, the club moved into the newly built Stadion Metalac in 2012. The stadium has a capacity of 4,400 seats.

== Players ==
=== First-team squad ===
As of 23 November 2025

Note: Flags indicate national team as defined under FIFA eligibility rules; some limited exceptions apply. Players may hold more than one non-FIFA nationality.

No.	Pos.	Nation	Player
1	GK	SRB	Luka Tasić
3	DF	SRB	Stefan Tešić
4	DF	SRB	Janko Mitrović
5	FW	SRB	Stefan Vukašinović
6	FW	SRB	Ognjen Luković
7	FW	SRB	Ilija Kovačević
8	FW	SRB	Viktor Petrović
9	FW	SRB	Vladimir Stevlić
12	GK	SRB	Dušan Begović
14	DF	SRB	Nikola Živanović
16	GK	SRB	Luka Balšić
18	MF	SRB	Željko Basarić
19	FW	SRB	Ognjen Petrović
21	FW	SRB	Luka Nikolić

No.	Pos.	Nation	Player
22	DF	SRB	Milan Jakovljević
23	MF	SRB	Ognjen Kostadinović
24	DF	SRB	Ilija Milićević
25	FW	SRB	Đorđe Jakovljević
26	MF	SRB	Jovan Kecović
27	MF	SRB	Branko Riznić
28	DF	SRB	Kristijan Jevtović
29	MF	SRB	Uroš Knežević
30	FW	SRB	Ognjen Luković
31	DF	SRB	Jovan Kaličanin
32	DF	SRB	Bojan Mijailović
77	FW	SRB	Dušan Ranisavljević
78	FW	SRB	Vuk Manojlović
99	MF	SRB	David Milinković

== Club officials ==
=== Coaching staff ===
Position	Name
Head coach	(Serbia) Srđan Bugarski
Assistant coach	(Serbia) Bojan Gojak
Goalkeeper coach	(Serbia) Nenad Vladić
Fitness coach	(Serbia) Đorđe Vlajković
Analyst trainer	(Serbia) Filip Dragojević
Doctor	(Serbia) Krsto Miljanović
Physiotherapist	(Serbia) Mirko Miljanović (Serbia) Radovan Petković
Economist	(Serbia) Anđelija Vulićević (Serbia) Snežana Todorović
Club president	(Serbia) Aleksandar Marušić
Sports director/Club secretary	(Serbia) Ivan Vuksanović
Stadium director	(Serbia) Branislav Arsić
General secretary	(Serbia) Zvonko Jevremović
Accounting	(Serbia) Slavica Radivojević

=== Notable players ===
This is a list of players who have played at full international level.

- (Chad) Misdongarde Betolngar
- (Republic of the Congo) Prestige Mboungou
- (Ghana) Yaw Antwi
- (Ghana) Kwame Boateng
- (Kenya) Richard Odada
- (Montenegro) Miloš Krkotić
- (Montenegro) Staniša Mandić
- (Montenegro) Janko Simović
- (North Macedonia) Nikola Karčev
- (Serbia) Nikola Ćirković
- (Serbia) Filip Kljajić
- (Serbia) Marko Milinković
- (Serbia) Marko Mirić
- (Serbia) Stefan Mitrović
- (Serbia) Miljan Mutavdžić
- (Serbia) Aleksandar Sedlar
- (Serbia) Nemanja Stojić
- (Serbia) Jovan Vlalukin

For a list of all FK Metalac Gornji Milanovac players with a Wikipedia article, see Category:FK Metalac Gornji Milanovac players.

== Historical list of coaches ==
- (Serbia and Montenegro) Miljojko Gošić (2002 - 03)
- (Serbia and Montenegro) Slobodan Stašević (2003)
- (Serbia and Montenegro) Dragan Lacmanović (2003)
- (Serbia and Montenegro) Miodrag Starčević (caretaker) (2004)
- (Serbia and Montenegro) Miljojko Gošić (2004 - 05)
- (Serbia) Slavenko Kuzeljević (2005 - 09)
- (Serbia) Nenad Milovanović (2009 - 10)
- (Serbia) Miodrag Starčević (caretaker) (2010)
- (Serbia) Zvonko Živković (2010)
- (Serbia) Miodrag Radanović (2010 - 11)
- (Serbia) Nenad Milovanović (2011)
- (Serbia) Milan Đuričić (2011)
- (Serbia) Neško Milovanović (caretaker) (2011)
- (Serbia) Jovica Škoro (17 Oct 2011 -11)
- (Serbia) Neško Milovanović (2012)
- (Serbia) Vladica Petrović (2012)
- (Serbia) Dragan Lacmanović (2012)
- (Serbia) Vladica Petrović (2012 - 13)
- (Serbia) Slavenko Kuzeljević (2013)
- (Serbia) Aleksandar Janjić (2013 - 14)
- (Serbia) Vladica Petrović (2014 - 15)
- (Serbia) Nenad Vanić (2015 - 17)
- (Serbia) Miloš Kruščić (9 Jun 2017 - 18)
- (Serbia) Aleksandar Janjić (2018 - 25 Oct 18)
- (Serbia) Aleksandar Stanković (27 Oct 2018 - 20)
- (Serbia) Žarko Lazetić (2020 - 21)
- (Serbia) Milija Žižić (29 Nov 2021 - 31 May 22)
- (Serbia) Dejan Rađenović (7 Jun 2022 - 20 Sep 22)
- (Serbia) Goran Matković (21 Sep 2022 - 1 Nov 22)
- (Serbia) Vladica Petrović (2 Nov 2022 - 21 Aug 23)
- (Serbia) Miloš Obradović (22 Aug 2023 - 24 Oct 23)
- (Serbia) Vladimir Otašević (25 Oct 2023 - 8 Sep 24)
- (Serbia) Goran Luković (9 Sep 2024-)
