= 2006–07 Serbian League West =

Serbian League West
- Season: 2006–07

Serbian League West is a section of the Serbian League, Serbia's third-tier football league. Teams from the western part of Serbia are in this section of the league. The other sections are Serbian League East, Serbian League Vojvodina, and Serbian League Belgrade. Metalac Gornji Milanovac were promoted to Serbian First League at the end of the season as they topped the table with 73 points.

== League table ==
Pos	Team	Pld	W	D	L	GF	GA	GD	Pts	Promotion or relegation
1	Metalac Gornji Milanovac (C, P)	34	21	10	3	45	17	+28	73	Promotion to Serbian First League
2	Morava Velika Plana	34	19	6	9	49	30	+19	63	
3	Sloga Kraljevo	34	19	4	11	49	32	+17	61	
4	Mladi Radnik	34	16	11	7	61	33	+28	59	
5	INON	34	16	7	11	48	42	+6	55	
6	Budućnost Valjevo	34	14	8	12	43	48	−5	50	
7	Radnički Kragujevac	34	13	11	10	50	42	+8	50	
8	Sloboda Čačak	34	13	11	10	40	37	+3	50	
9	Sloboda Užice	34	14	7	13	50	43	+7	49	
10	Metalac Kraljevo	34	14	7	13	47	43	+4	49	
11	Vujić Voda	34	13	8	13	45	37	+8	47	
12	Jedinstvo Ub	34	14	5	15	46	46	0	47	
13	Rudar Kostolac (R)	34	13	5	16	39	58	−19	44	Qualification for relegation play-offs
14	Bane (R)	34	12	5	17	52	65	−13	41	Qualification for relegation play-offs
15	Sloga Požega (R)	34	11	7	16	39	49	−10	40	Relegation to Zone League
16	Loznica (R)	34	9	7	18	45	53	−8	34	Relegation to Zone League
17	Takovo (R)	34	6	4	24	30	63	−33	22	Relegation to Zone League
18	Jadar Gornji Dobrić (R)	34	3	9	22	38	76	−38	18	Relegation to Zone League

(C) Champions; (P) Promoted; (R) Relegated
