= FK Novi Pazar =

Football club in Serbia

Novi Pazar
- Full name: Fudbalski Klub Novi Pazar
- Nickname: Plavi (The Blues)
- Founded: 1928; 98 years ago
- Ground: Novi Pazar City Stadium
- Capacity: 10,000
- President: Bajro Župić
- Manager: Nenad Lalatović
- League: Serbian SuperLiga
- 2025–26: Serbian SuperLiga, 5th of 16
- Website: fknovipazar.com
Home colours	Away colours	Third colours

Fudbalski klub Novi Pazar (Serbian Cyrillic: Фудбалски клуб Нови Пазар) is a Serbian professional football club based in the city of Novi Pazar, which competes in the Serbian SuperLiga. The team plays their home games at the Novi Pazar City Stadium.

The club was formed in 1928 as FK Sandžak and has achieved its greatest successes since Serbia has become an independent country, reaching the top tier of national competition for the first time ever in 2011. Novi Pazar was granted promotion after 2010–11 Serbian First League champions BASK withdrew from the SuperLiga due to limited funds and not meeting the required stadium criteria set out by the Football Association of Serbia.

In 2019–20 Serbian First League they finished mid-table but due to the Football Association of Serbia re-structuring the Serbian SuperLiga, they were awarded a place/took the place of RFK Grafičar, a Belgrade club that had to withdraw from the Serbian SuperLiga due to limited funds and not meeting the required stadium criteria set out by the Football Association of Serbia.

Recently, the club's biggest success was finishing 3rd out of 16 teams in the 2024–25 Serbian SuperLiga, and thus securing a spot in the Conference League second qualifying round. It is the club's first ever European football appearance. Adem Ljajić, a Novi Pazar native, played a key role in the teams success in the 2024-2025 season.

== History ==
=== Yugoslav period ===
The club was founded in 1928, under the name FK Sandžak, which later changed to FK Deževa. The club has played under its current name since 1962, when FK Deževa and another local football club, the FK Ras, merged under the name FK Novi Pazar. The club was a Yugoslav amateur-leagues champion, and was later a member of the Yugoslav Second League.

Its first notable achievement happened in 1984 when the club won the Serbian Republic League, at time one of Yugoslav third tiers, and were promoted to the Yugoslav Second League for the first time in 56 years of existence till then. They finished the season with 43 points (at time it was two points per victory) with 17 wins, 9 draws and 4 losses, and a score balance of 42–14. The Serbian Republic League at time was very competitive and Novi Pazar that season finished top of teams such as Radnički Kragujevac, Čukarički, Obilić, Sinđelić, Jagodina, Sloga Kraljevo, Loznica, Dubočica, Radnički Obrenovac, Budućnost Valjevo, Rudar Kostolac, Kristal Zaječar, Majdanpek, Đerdap Kladovo and 7. Juli Vrčin. The celebration of the promotion to the Second League happened in the last round in the 2–1 home victory over 7. Juli, but the major celebration happened two rounds earlier when Novi Pazar secured the league title at the 1–1 draw away in Belgrade against Sinđelić. The game was attended by 3.000 spectators of which 2.500 were Novi Pazar fans that had travelled to Belgrade. The goal for Novi Pazar was scored by Milan Glavčić who scored 23 goals overall that season and was the club's top scorer. The players that formed that notorious generation of Novi Pazar that season were goalkeepers Novica Jovanović, Dragan Goševac, Naser Halitović, defenders Dragan Kostić, Bajro Župić, Darko Vujović, Esad Karišik, Nazim Izberović, Ratko Šarac, Radojica Milojević, Salih Detanac, Izet Ljajić, Ljutvo Bogućanin, midfielders Ferid Ganić, Rizo Tutić, Mirsad Karišik, Adnan Numanović, Ismail Bihorac, Nermin Ukić, and forwards Ismet Ugljanin, Milan Glavčić, Gmitar Vukadinović, Šerif Izberović and Naser Salihu. The club president was Amir Beširović while the coach was Dušan Radonjić and his assistant was Aćif Klimenta.

The generation of 1984 also managed to win the Yugoslav amateur-league leagues championship, which was played between the winners of all eight leagues forming the Yugoslav third tier, those in the six republics (Bosnia and Herzegovina, Croatia, Macedonia, Montenegro, Serbia and Slovenia) and in the two autonomous provinces (Kosovo and Vojvodina). As winner of the 1983–84 Serbian Republic League, FK Novi Pazar represented Serbia that year and won the tournament. After beating Liria away in Prizren by 3–0, Novi Pazar played the final at home at the City Stadium where they beat Crvenka by 2–0 with goals from Esad Karišik and Ismet Ugljanin. A member of that generation, Enver Gusinac, who became club captain in the seasons that followed, but missed the season because of the Yugoslav People's Army conscription, made his return in the final.

==== Serbia/Montenegro period ====
The club qualified for a promotion play-off spot for the First League of FR Yugoslavia twice, but lost on both occasions. They lost to Sutjeska Nikšić in 1994, and to Sloboda Užice in 1995. In 2002, the club was relegated to the Serbian League, third division in Serbia. After one season in the Serbian League they were promoted back to the Serbian First League. During the 1980s and 1990s the club was magnet to many of the talented Kosovo Albanian players such as Nazmi Rama, Naser Salihu, Mentor Miftari, Sadik Rrahmani, Gëzim Hasi, Besnik Kollari, Shefqer Kurti, or manager Hysni Maxhuni.

==== First time in SuperLiga ====
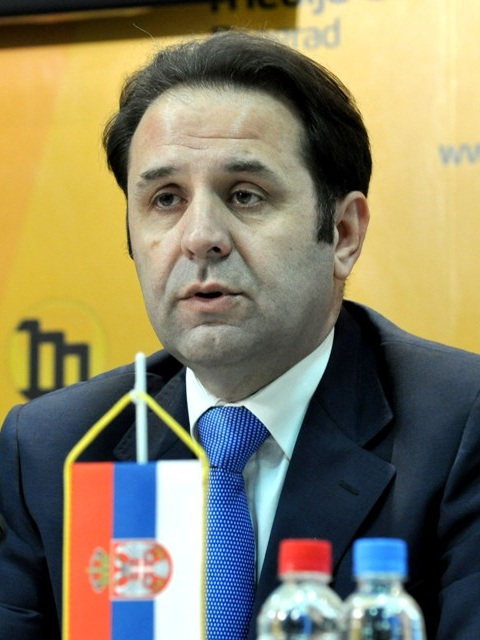
Rasim Ljajić played a role in the entry of the club into first-tier competition in 2011.

The club played in the second tier until 2011, when they came in third. At the end of the 2010–11 Serbian First League season, first-placed second-tier team FK BASK was not financially prepared for the Serbian SuperLiga, which caused a huge controversy and debate in Serbian football circles regarding who in BASK's place should take the birth in the top-tier Serbian SuperLiga in the following season. Two candidates emerged: FK Inđija, which had occupied a relegation place in the previous SuperLiga season, and FK Novi Pazar, which finished in non-promoting third place in the second-tier championship. Both clubs were backed by political proxies in their campaigns to take BASKS's place in the SuperLiga. Goran Ješić, who was the president of the municipality of Inđija as well as an official of the Democratic Party, represented the lobby for FK Inđija to keep its place in the top flight. FK Novi Pazar, meanwhile, was backed by the powerful lobby of Rasim Ljajić. In the end, FK Novi Pazar was promoted along with second-place Radnički Kragujevac. The 2011–12 Serbian SuperLiga was the first ever season in which FK Novi Pazar played in the top flight. Ivan Babić participated in a historic moment for FK Novi Pazar after scoring the first goal in the top division for the club.

==== Recent history ====
The season of 2012–2013 was a difficult one for the club. After the first half of the season FK Novi Pazar ranked 10th place in the Serbian Superliga. In December 2012, an accumulated financial crisis in the club resulted in several players and directors leaving the club. Irfan Vušljanin, regarded by many as one of the club's best players in recent years, was quoted saying that "I've played for many clubs, but I've never seen this kind of chaos like now in FK Novi Pazar." Like most of the playing squad, Dragoljub Bekvalac had not received payment in the previous four months and promptly resigned from the position of coach, and even considered suing the club via the district court for compensation. Days later, it was announced that famous Serbian coach Slavenko Kuzeljević, known for his success with Radnički Kragujevac, agreed to replace Bekvalac as coach. Subsequent to the announcement of the new coach, the former leader of Partizan's medical team, dr. Sead Malićević, was named the new president of the club. FK Novi Pazar finished 14th placed in the 2012–13 season which saw them remain in the first division.

During the 2013–14 season, Novi Pazar was in no danger of relegation. They won against OFK Belgrade at home and drew goalless against Partizan. They finished the season ranked 8th.

Novi Pazar improved their form in the 2014–15 Serbian Superliga season. They won 2–1 against Red Star at home, 3–1 against OFK Belgrade at home and drew 1–1 against Partizan at home and away. They finished the season placed 5th.

In season 2019/20 they finished mid table in the Serbian First League (Second Division) but due to the FSS ( Football Association of Serbia) re-structuring the Serbian SuperLiga due to the COVID-19 Pandemic by adding four more teams to the top tier of the Serbian SuperLiga and due to FK Novi Pazar having a modern UEFA standard stadium when most clubs in Serbia don't, they were awarded a place/took the place of FK Grafičar Beograd, a Belgrade club who basically had a pitch/field and no stadium to speak of. So after a three-year absence FK Novi Pazar would again join the elite national competition.

== Stadium ==
Novi Pazar City Stadium (Serbian Cyrillic: Градски стадион у Новом Пазару), located in the eastern part of the city, is the home venue of FK Novi Pazar. The stadium was officially opened on 12 April 2012 after one-year reconstruction and it can hold 12,000 people at full capacity.

The stadium began undergoing complete reconstruction during the first half of 2011 in an ambitious project by the Football Association of Serbia and the city of Novi Pazar. The project includes the renovation of the eastern, west and northern stands. The project includes also the covering of the whole stadium, new floodlights, new locker and press room, new ambulance, parking area, ticket office. After reconstruction, the stadium fulfill the most up to date UEFA standards. The cost of the project was estimated to be over 230 million Serbian dinars (2 million euros).

== Supporters ==
The three largest supporters groups of FK Novi Pazar are known as Torcida Sandžak, Ultra Azzurro and Ekstremi. Organized tifo support for FK Novi Pazar was first established in the late 1980s. Ultras of Fenerbahçe first recognized the fans of FK Novi Pazar in 2011, and a friendship now exists between the ultras of the clubs from Istanbul and Novi Pazar.

Ultras in Novi Pazar have Right-Wing views and have a recent history of both scandalous and disrespectful displays. In October 2012, Ekstremi held up a mocking display about the illegal organ harvesting in Kosovo as a provocation to Rad, a team from outside of Novi Pazar from where the supporters were mostly Christian Serbs. The incident garnered shocked reactions from media and government officials both in Serbia and in other countries. However, ultras in Novi Pazar are also known to act respectfully to visiting teams from outside of Novi Pazar.

In April 2013, during a home match against Partizan Belgrade, a supporter of FK Novi Pazar threw an activated homemade explosive device to the visiting supporters, which fell to the athletic field and did not explode. The explosive device was wrapped with tape and filled with nails. It was the same person who caused, on 26 November 2011, a false bomb alarm in the Novi Pazar City Stadium, leading to a criminal charge against him of causing panic. FK Novi Pazar club management sharply condemned the action.

Torcida Sandžak, on a different note, earned worldwide recognition when the group organized a protest in the form of a public march which was attended by thousands of people. The protest was held in a peaceful manner without negative incidents.

== Kit manufacturers ==
Period	Kit Manufacturer
2011–12	Nike
2012–14	Joma
2014–15	Umbro
2015–21	Adidas
2021–23	Nike
2023–	Macron

== Novi Pazar in Europe ==
Novi Pazar scores are given first in all scorelines.

Season	Competition	Round	Opponent	Home	Away	Aggregate
2025–26	UEFA Conference League	2Q	(Poland) Jagiellonia Białystok	1–2	1–3	2–5

== Players ==
=== Current squad ===
As of 19 September 2026

Note: Flags indicate national team as defined under FIFA eligibility rules; some limited exceptions apply. Players may hold more than one non-FIFA nationality.

No.	Pos.	Nation	Player
1	GK	SRB	Bogdan Matijašević (on loan from Mladost Lučani)
2	DF	SRB	Aleksandar Miljković
3	DF	SRB	Veljko Mirosavić
4	DF	SRB	Ahmed Hadžimujović
5	DF	MNE	Stefan Melentijević
6	MF	SEN	Papa Amady Gadio (on loan from Akhmat Grozny)
7	FW	BRA	Jonny Robert
8	MF	GHA	Skima Togbe
9	FW	NED	Vieiri Kotzebue
10	MF	ENG	Dominic Sadi
11	MF	SRB	Nikola Skrobonja
12	GK	SRB	Miloje Preković
14	DF	SRB	Nikola Stanković
15	DF	SRB	Bakir Bilalović
16	MF	SRB	Ahmed Ljajić
17	MF	CRO	Matija Malekinušić
18	FW	SLO	Haris Kadrić (on loan from Kauno Žalgiris)

No.	Pos.	Nation	Player
19	MF	SRB	Ersan Mavrić
20	FW	JAM	Kaheim Dixon
21	MF	SRB	Mihajlo Petrović
22	MF	SRB	Adem Ljajić
23	DF	SRB	Jovan Marinković (captain)
24	MF	SRB	Ivan Davidović
25	GK	SRB	Haris Alić
26	MF	NGR	Johnson Dauda (on loan from Slovan Liberec)
27	DF	SRB	Hamad Šaćirović
32	DF	MNE	Bojan Adžić
34	MF	SRB	Faris Redžović
35	FW	SRB	Faris Osmanović
36	MF	SRB	Hamza Doljanac
44	DF	SLO	Max Bilać
50	DF	CRO	Tomislav Dadić
70	MF	SRB	Dimitrije Janković (on loan from Partizan)
99	FW	SRB	Fejsal Mulić

=== Out on loan ===
Note: Flags indicate national team as defined under FIFA eligibility rules; some limited exceptions apply. Players may hold more than one non-FIFA nationality.

No.	Pos.	Nation	Player
—	GK	SRB	Saladin Mecinović (at Timok until the end of the 2026–27 season)

=== Technical staff ===
As of 21 October 2026

Current technical staff
- Head coach: (Serbia) Nenad Lalatović
- Assistant coach: (Serbia) Aleksandar Sekulić
- Assistant coach: (Serbia) Milan Vještica
- Assistant coach: (Serbia) Vujadin Radenković
- Fitness coach: (Serbia) Stefan Petrović
- Fitness coach: (Serbia) Rijad Zećirović
- Goalkeeper coach: (Serbia) Radosav Ćirica
- Secretary of the coaching staff: (Serbia) Emir Bihorac
- Doctor: (Serbia) Dr Faruk Pašović
- Physiotherapist: (Serbia) Haris Bihorac
- Physiotherapist: (Bosnia and Herzegovina) Benjamin Hamčović
Stručni štab:
Medicinski tim:

=== Management ===
As of 26 January 2025

Current management
- President: (Serbia) Bajro Župić
- General secretary: (Serbia) Fikret Međedović
- Secretary of the coaching staff: (Serbia) Emir Bihorac
- Technical secretary: (Serbia) Semir Gusinac
Menadžment kluba:

== Notable players ==
To appear in this section a player must have either:

- Played at least 80 games for the club.
- Set a club record or won an individual award while at the club.
- Played at least one international match for their national team at any time.
- (Socialist Federal Republic of Yugoslavia) Abdulah Gegić
- (Serbia) Rahim Beširović
- (Serbia) Almir Gegić
- (Serbia) Sead Hadžibulić
- (Serbia) Sead Halilagić
- (Serbia) Admir Kecap
- (Serbia) Kemal Kuč
- (Serbia) Đorđe Tutorić
- (Serbia) Bajro Župić
- (Australia) Aleksandar Šušnjar
- (Bosnia and Herzegovina) Dario Damjanović
- (Bosnia and Herzegovina) Petar Jelić
- (Bosnia and Herzegovina) Numan Kurdić
- (Bosnia and Herzegovina) Denis Mujkić
- (Bosnia and Herzegovina) Amar Rahmanović
- (Bosnia and Herzegovina) Sead Ramović
- (Bosnia and Herzegovina) Admir Raščić
- (Bosnia and Herzegovina) Nemanja Supić
- (Bosnia and Herzegovina) Almedin Ziljkić
- (Guinea) Abdoulaye Cissé
- (Honduras) Luis López
- (Liberia) Omega Roberts
- (Montenegro) Stefan Lončar
- (North Macedonia) Stefan Aškovski
- (North Macedonia) Darko Micevski
- (Singapore) Fahrudin Mustafić
- (South Sudan) Kur Gai Kur
- (Uganda) Vincent Kayizzi

For the list of current and former players with Wikipedia article, please see: Category:FK Novi Pazar players.

== Historical list of coaches ==
- (Republic of Kosova) Hysni Maxhuni (1995 – 1996)
- (Serbia) Sead Halilagić (2006 – 2007)
- (Serbia) Esad Karišik (2007)
- (Serbia) Slavko Jović (2007)
- (Serbia) Mladen Dodić (December 2007 – March 2008)
- (Serbia) Saudin Huseinović (March 2008 – 2008)
- (Montenegro) Dušan Jevrić (2008 – October 2008)
- (Serbia) Saudin Huseinović (October 2008 – April 2009)
- (Serbia) Ismet Ugljanin (April 2009 – May 2009)
- (Serbia) Ljutvo Bogućanin (interim) (May 2009 – June 2009)
- (Serbia) Saša Štrbac (July 2009 – October 2009)
- (Serbia) Slavko Vojičić (October 2009 – 2009)
- (Serbia) Dušan Kljajić (January 2010 – March 2010)
- (Serbia) Mile Vuletić (April 2010 – 2010)
- (Serbia) Saša Štrbac (July 2010 – September 2010)
- (Serbia) Jovica Škoro (September 2010 – January 2011)
- (Serbia) Mladen Dodić (January 2011 – June 2011)
- (Serbia) Izet Ljajić (interim) (June 2011)
- (Serbia) Mihailo Ivanović (July 2011 – August 2011)
- (Serbia) Ljubomir Ristovski (September 2011 – April 2012)
- (Serbia) Dragoljub Bekvalac (April 2012 – December 2012)
- (Serbia) Slavenko Kuzeljević (December 2012 – April 2013)
- (Serbia) Nebojša Vučićević (April 2013 – August 2013)
- (Serbia) Milan Milanović (August 2013 – December 2013)
- (Serbia) Zoran Njeguš (December 2013 – June 2014)
- (North Macedonia) Dragi Kanatlarovski (June 2014 – September 2014)
- (Serbia) Milorad Kosanović (September 2014 – June 2015)
- (Serbia) Petar Kurćubić (June 2015 – August 2015)
- (Serbia) Mladen Dodić (August 2015 – October 2015)
- (Serbia) Radmilo Ivančević (October 2015 – January 2016)
- (Serbia) Zoran Marić (January 2016 – September 2016)
- (Serbia) Zoran Govedarica (September 2016 – November 2016)
- (Serbia) Nebojša Vučićević (January 2017 – April 2017)
- (Serbia) Saudin Huseinović (interim) (April 2017)
- (Serbia) Neško Milovanović (April 2017 – May 2017)
- (Serbia) Marjan Živković (June 2017 – March 2018)
- (Serbia) Stevan Mojsilović (March 2018 – April 2018)
- (Serbia) Vladica Petrović (April 2018 – February 2019)
- (Serbia) Neško Milovanović (February 2019 – April 2019)
- (Serbia) Vladica Petrović (April 2019 – May 2019)
- (Serbia) Slavko Matić (June 2019 – September 2019)
- (Serbia) Darko Tešović (September 2019 – November 2019)
- (Serbia) Kenan Kolašinac (November 2019 – November 2020)
- (Montenegro) Radoslav Batak (November 2020 – February 2021)
- (Serbia) Davor Berber (February 2021 – May 2021)
- (Serbia) Milan Milanović (June 2021 – September 2021)
- (Serbia) Kenan Kolašinac (14 September 2021 – October 2021)
- (Montenegro) Dragan Radojičić (16 October 2021 – February 2022)
- (Serbia) Tomislav Sivić (20 February 2022 – May 2022)
- (Serbia) Vladimir Gaćinović (June 2022 – October 2022)
- (Montenegro) Damir Čakar (15 October 2022 – 13 December 2022)
- (Serbia) Aleksandar Stanković (14 December 2022 – 18 March 2023)
- (Serbia) Davor Berber (28 March 2023 – 31 May 2023)
- (Serbia) Dragan Aničić (5 June 2023 – August 2023)
- (Cyprus) Siniša Dobrašinović (24 August 2023 – 31 December 2023)
- (Serbia) Igor Matić (9 January 2024 – March 2024)
- (Serbia) Slavko Matić (3 April 2024 – May 2024)
- (Serbia) Nikola Trajković (25 May 2024 – 25 August 2024)
- (Serbia) Tomislav Sivić (25 August 2024 – February 2025)
- (Serbia) Vladimir Gaćinović (February 2025 – February 2026)
- (Serbia) Nenad Lalatović (February 2026 – May 2026)
- (Serbia) Strahinja Pandurović (June 2026 – )
