= Ivan Guteša =

Serbian footballer (born 2002)

- Guteša playing for Red Star Belgrade in 2024

Personal information
- Date of birth: 4 April 2002 (age 24)
- Place of birth: Vršac, FR Yugoslavia
- Height: 1.89 m (6 ft 2 in)
- Position: Goalkeeper

Team information
- Current team: Red Star Belgrade
- Number: 77

Youth career
- –2017: OFK Vršac
- 2017–2020: Red Star Belgrade
- 2019–2020: → Grafičar Beograd (youth loan)

Senior career*
Years	Team	Apps	(Gls)
2019–2020	Red Star Belgrade	0	(0)
2019–2020	→ Grafičar Beograd (loan)	0	(0)
2021–2023	Grafičar Beograd	36	(0)
2022	→ BSK Borča (loan)	15	(0)
2024–	Red Star Belgrade	15	(0)
2024	→ Grafičar Beograd (dual)	15	(0)

International career^{‡}
2023	Serbia U21	1	(0)
- * Club domestic league appearances and goals as of 17 May 2025 ‡ National team caps and goals as of 28 March 2023

Ivan Guteša (Serbian Cyrillic: Иван Гутеша, born 4 April 2002) is a Serbian professional footballer who plays as a goalkeeper for Red Star Belgrade.

== Career ==
Ivan Guteša was born on April 4, 2022 in Vršac, from which he borrowed the gloves of Red Star Belgrade in the younger categories. He was part of a team that placed among the 16 best junior teams in Europe.

With the selection of the Football Association of Vojvodina, at his age, he participated in winning of the 15th "Pera Jocić" Memorial Tournament. In the summer of the same year, he joined the younger categories of the Red Star Belgrade team from the OFK Vršac. After the cadet age in which he played for Red Star Belgrade, Guteša spent the second part of the 2019 calendar year with the Grafičar Beograd youth team and was registered for the Serbian First League. Later, he returned to the youth team of Red Star Belgrade, where, alongside Aleksandar Vulić, he played the role of backup netminder in the Serbian Youth League and the UEFA Youth League, then standard for Andrija Katić.

In the following period, he was again part of the Grafičar Beograd. In the Autumn part of the competition 2022/23. he spent the time in the BSK Borča team, after which he returned to Grafičar Beograd and stood in front of the goal in the Serbian First League. During the winter preparations of 2024 season, Balša Popović trained with Red Star Belgrade who later on did not continued with the Red Star Belgrade due his past, He was recorded how he sing songs of eternal Red Star's rival Partizan, who that move is strictly forbidden by the side of Delije group of fans. while the youngster Vuk Draškić also made his debut for the first team. However, as Omri Glazer, who was injured, and Zoran Popović, Guteša was withdrawn from the Grafičar Beograd team. He signed a two-and-a-half-year contract and borrowed the Red Star Belgrade jersey with the number 77. Due to his age, at that moment he met the requirement for a bonus footballer. A few days later, he sat on the bench at the match of the 20th round of the Serbian Super League, with the Voždovac team. For Grafičar Beograd, in accordance with the established Rulebook, He continued to defend in the rest of the season. He defended in a friendly match between Red Star Belgrade and Zenit St. Petersburg in March 2024 at the Rajko Mitić Stadium, which was also his debut appearance. He made his first official debut for the club in the penultimate round of the 2023/24 competition. in the Serbian Super League, against Napredak Kruševac in Kruševac, in a match that ended with a score of 0:4 for Red Star Belgrade.

During the 2024 summer preparatory period, he defended on the tour that Red Star Belgrade had in Russia. The club later hired Marko Ilić as an option in front of the goal, who won the trust of the coaching staff in the opening part of the season. Guteša continued to guard the goal of Grafičar Beograd. However, due to Ilić's poor form and injury, as well as frequent problems with Omri Glazer's injury, Guteša for the first time was officially debuted during the competitive season 2024–25 Serbian SuperLiga. where he guarded the goal of Red Star Belgrade against OFK Beograd. In the same month, he made his debut in the 5th round of the 2024–25 UEFA Champions League season when Red Star Belgrade defeated Stuttgart 5:1 at home, In January of the following year, he extended his contract with the club until the summer of 2027. He defended his team's goal against Partizan for the first time in the serbian 175th eternal derby, which ended with a score of 3:3.

=== International career ===
In March 2023, he received an invitation from Goran Stevanović to the Serbia U21 for two friendly matches. In the second of them, against the United States U20 who was played in Marbella, without a goal during the regular part of the match, He defended in the second half and the subsequent penalty shootout when he saved two kicks from the white spot. He was also invited to the June gathering of the composition of the same year, under the leadership of Dušan Đorđević.

=== Off the pitch ===
And along with professional football career, He is also a regular at the Sport university — Nikola Tesla, considering that he is a journalism student, In the January 2025 he also started to publish a columns for serbian sports portal "Mozzartsport" and all fees from the columns are going in charitable purposes.

== Statistics ==
=== Club ===
As of match played 17 May 2025

Club	Season	League			Cup		Continental		Other		Total	
Club	Season	Division	Apps	Goals	Apps	Goals	Apps	Goals	Apps	Goals	Apps	Goals
Grafičar Beograd	2020–21	Mozzart Bet First League	3	0	0	0	–		0	0	3	0
Grafičar Beograd	2021–22	Mozzart Bet First League	1	0	0	0	–		–		1	0
Grafičar Beograd	2022–23	Mozzart Bet First League	12	0	0	0	–		2 (Note: Appearances in relegation play-offs)	0	13	0
Grafičar Beograd	2023–24	Mozzart Bet First League	20	0	2	0	–		–		22	0
Grafičar Beograd	Total		35	0	2	0	–		2	0	39	0
Red Star Belgrade	2023–24	Serbian SuperLiga	1	0	0	0	0	0	0	0	1	0
Red Star Belgrade	2024–25	Serbian SuperLiga	14	0	1	0	3 (Note: Appearances in UEFA Champions League)	0	0	0	18	0
Red Star Belgrade	2025–26	Serbian SuperLiga	0	0	0	0	0	0	—		0	0
Red Star Belgrade	Total		15	0	1	0	3	0	0	0	19	0
Grafičar Beograd (loan)	2023–24	Mozzart Bet First League	11	0	–		–		–		11	0
Career total			61	0	3	0	3	0	2	0	69	0

== Honours ==
Red Star Belgrade

- Serbian SuperLiga: 2024–25
