= Crna Glava =

Crna Glava Тлсто Брдо, from 1284.a.c.Црна Глава Black Head
- Village (Selo)
- Motto: "Sveti Bože"(Eng. Holy God/Revengeless God)
- Location within Serbia
- Coordinates: 43°22′N 20°49′E
- Country: Serbia
- District: Raška District
- Municipality: Raška
- Elevation: 7,018 ft (2,139 m)

Population (2002)
  - Total: 246
- Time zone: UTC+1 (CET)
  - Summer (DST): UTC+2 (CEST)

Crna Glava (Serbian: Црна Глава) is a village in the municipality of Raška, Serbia. As of the 2002 census, the village has a population of 246 people. Crna Glava is one of the oldest places in Serbia and is mentioned in Žiča in "hrisovulja" from 1222.A.C. as "Čisto brdo" which is a part of today's village.

== Origins ==
The first mention of the village is on the wall of the Žiča Church from the year 1222. The inscription says that people from "Testo Brdo" ("Clean Hill") and Raška contributed to the building of the church. Today, Testo Brdo is part of Crna Glava. The name Crna Glava (meaning Black Head in English) was first mentioned in patriarch Danilo II's book, where it is recounted that people from this village killed Černoglav (Black Headed), the leader of a tribe of Tatars who was known to have attacked and robbed many villages at the time in Rascia and Serbia. After killing Černoglav, the people of the village brought his head to King Stefan Milutin. Since then the village has been known by the name Crna Glava.

== History ==
The village is on the Kopaonik mountain range, whose average elevation is 1,397 m (4,583 ft). The highest part of the village is Gobelja hill, which is easily identifiable from Kopaonik by its antenna. It is said that the village has the purest nature in Serbia, boasting clear waters and rare species of birds and plants. This is a place for summer mountain adventures such as paragliding, mountain horse riding, and walking. The village has tombs named "stećak," which were made in the middle age. The people living in the village are direct ancestors of Middle Age noble families that were in service to the Nemanjić dynasty royal family and represent a community known as Rascians. While the history of this place was under Ottoman Empire, there has been no influence on people who live in this village. In the village, you can experience the real spirit of life in Serbia as traditional ways of life have been maintained to the present time.

The following families live in the village today: Trifunović, Vukosavljević, Josijević, Matić, Maksimović, and Dišić. They are from the same ancestors who came to this place in the early middle age. Other families who came from the same ancestors but have left the village previously are the Nedeljković and Crnoglavac families (which have the last name by name of village). Each family is known for the same slava that they celebrate St.Michael (archangel) and Joachim and Saint Anne.

On the other side of the village is the Đorđević family. Their ancestors came from Novi Pazar in 1804, after ustanak was overrun by the Turks.

== Points of interest ==
One of the parts of the village is named "Metallica", which represents its Old Slavic name for mine. Other parts that might be interesting are "Šaklaman", "Gradišta", and "Velika Stena". Velika Stena is a gigantic rock on top of the village, under Gobelja hill and "Čisto Brdo", it is considered a fantastic place for all adventurists. The village has colonies of eastern imperial eagles, wolves, wild cats, western capercaillie, wild boars, roe deer, rock partridges, and fire salamanders.

Crna glava is well known as the origin place of the Serbian shepherd dog and Sarplaninac dog breeds.

== Notable people ==
- Nikola Crnoglavac handball player and Serbian representative
- Đorđe Dišić (Georgii de Disica) founder of Caboga (Kabižić) noble family from Dubrovnik might be one of the first known people connected to the village.
- Miloš Dišić, a former member of sixth Serbian parliament from December 2003.
