= Ognjen Mimović =

Serbian footballer (born 2004)

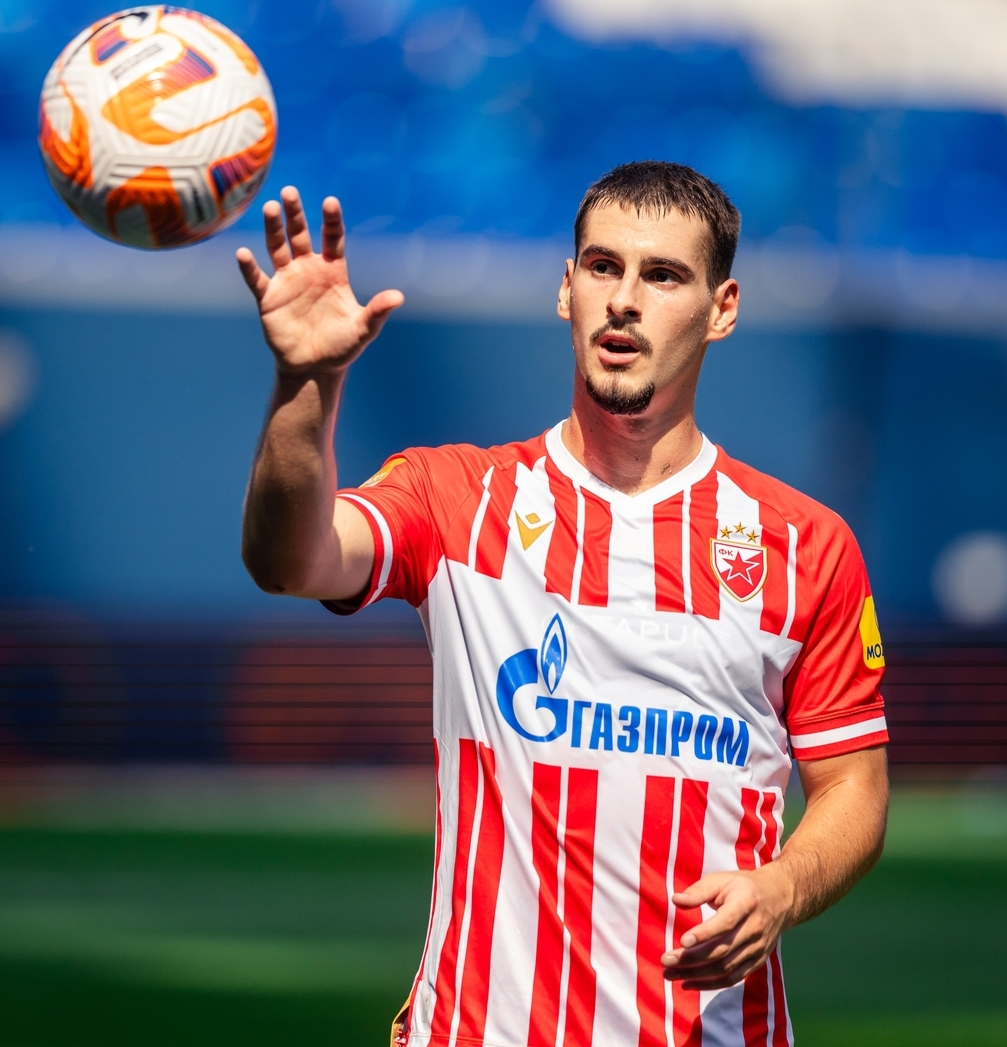

Personal information
- Date of birth: 17 August 2004 (age 22)
- Place of birth: Gornji Milanovac, Serbia and Montenegro
- Height: 1.79 m (5 ft 10 in)
- Position: Right-back

Team information
- Current team: Fenerbahçe
- Number: 77

Youth career
- Metalac Gornji Milanovac
- Red Star Belgrade

Senior career*
| Years | Team | Apps | (Gls) |
| 2023–2025 | Red Star Belgrade | 25 | (0) |
| 2023 | → OFK Beograd (loan) | 25 | (0) |
| 2025– | Fenerbahçe | 0 | (0) |
| 2025 | → Zenit Saint Petersburg (loan) | 4 | (0) |
| 2025–2026 | → Pafos (loan) | 24 | (0) |

International career^{‡}
| 2021–2022 | Serbia U18 | 0 | (0) |
| 2022 | Serbia U19 | 4 | (1) |
| 2024– | Serbia U21 | 6 | (0) |
| 2025– | Serbia | 8 | (0) |
- * Club domestic league appearances and goals as of 12:40, 4 June 2026 (UTC) ‡ National team caps and goals as of 4 June 2026

Ognjen Mimović (Serbian Cyrillic: Огњен Мимовић; born 17 August 2004) is a Serbian professional footballer who plays as a right-back for Süper Lig club Fenerbahçe, and the Serbia national team.

== Club career ==
=== Early career ===
Mimović arrived at Red Star Belgrade from his native Metalac Gornji Milanovac. He also performed combined for the younger age groups of Grafičar Beograd, where he also trained with the first team during the summer of 2022.

=== OFK Beograd ===
In early 2023, Mimović was loaned to OFK Beograd. On 13 May 2023, he was sent off in a Serbian League Belgrade match against Zemun after referee Srđan Jovanović showed him a second yellow card. At the end of that competition, OFK Beograd finished in first place, winning three points in the last round with the official result. After being promoted to a higher level of competition, Mimović continued to play for the OFK Beograd in the Serbian First League.

Due to the agreed transfer of Kosta Nedeljković to Aston Villa, and then the news about his injury, Mimović extended his contract with Red Star Belgrade. He was added to the first team under coach Vladan Milojević, but the possibility was left, in accordance with the established Rulebook, that he could also play for OFK Beograd in the rest of the season.

=== Red Star Belgrade ===
Mimović made his debut for Red Star Belgrade in the 22nd round of the Serbian SuperLiga for the 2023–24 Serbian SuperLiga season. On February 24, 2024, he started the game against Čukarički as a bonus player, entering the match during the second half of the 172nd Eternal derby, replacing Marko Stamenić on the field. In that match, after an attack in the 86th minute, Mimović hit the opposing team's crossbar.

=== Fenerbahçe ===
On 31 January 2025, Mimović joined Turkish club Fenerbahçe for an undisclosed fee, until the end of 2028–29 season.

==== Zenit Saint Petersburg (loan) ====
On 12 February 2025, he moved to Russian Premier League club Zenit Saint Petersburg on loan until the end of 2024–25 season. On 8 March 2025, Mimović made his Russian Premier League debut as a starter with the club in a 0–2 away victory against Fakel Voronezh. On 12 March 2025, he made his Russian Cup debut in a 2–0 home victory against Rostov. Mimović left Zenit after his loan spell expired.

==== Pafos FC (loan) ====
On 8 September 2025, he loaned to Pafos FC until the end of season with option to buy.

== International career ==
In September 2022, Mimović received his first call-up from Jovan Damjanović to the Serbia U19 team for the Stevan Vilotić Ćele Memorial Tournament. During the U19 qualification against Poland U19 in March 2023, which ended in a 2–2 draw, he scored one of the goals, after which the Serbia national team failed to qualify for the final tournament. Midway through March 2024, Mimović was called up by coach Ljubinko Drulović to the Serbia U21 for qualification matches at the end of the same month.

On 4 March 2025, Mimović was called up by Dragan Stojković to the Serbian senior team for the 2024–25 UEFA Nations League relegation play-offs against Austria. On 20 March, he debuted as a starter and provided an assist to Lazar Samardžić in a 1–1 draw of the same match at Ernst-Happel-Stadion, Vienna.

== Career statistics ==
=== Club ===
As of match played 22 May 2026

Appearances and goals by club, season and competition
| Club | Season | League | | | National cup (Note: Includes Serbian Cup, Russian Cup, Turkish Cup, Cypriot Cup) | | Continental | | Other | | Total | |
| Club | Season | Division | Apps | Goals | Apps | Goals | Apps | Goals | Apps | Goals | Apps | Goals |
|---|---|---|---|---|---|---|---|---|---|---|---|---|
| Red Star Belgrade | 2023–24 | Serbian SuperLiga | 13 | 0 | 2 | 0 | — | | — | | 15 | 0 |
| Red Star Belgrade | 2024–25 | Serbian SuperLiga | 12 | 0 | 0 | 0 | 7 (Note: Appearances in UEFA Champions League) | 1 | — | | 19 | 1 |
| Red Star Belgrade | Total | | 25 | 0 | 2 | 0 | 7 | 1 | — | | 34 | 1 |
| OFK Beograd (loan) | 2022–23 | Serbian League Belgrade | 11 | 0 | — | | — | | — | | 11 | 0 |
| OFK Beograd (loan) | 2023–24 | Serbian First League | 14 | 0 | — | | — | | — | | 14 | 0 |
| OFK Beograd (loan) | Total | | 25 | 0 | — | | — | | — | | 25 | 0 |
| Fenerbahçe | 2026–27 | Süper Lig | 0 | 0 | 0 | 0 | 0 | 0 | 0 | 0 | 0 | 0 |
| Zenit Saint Petersburg (loan) | 2024–25 | Russian Premier League | 4 | 0 | 2 | 0 | — | | — | | 6 | 0 |
| Pafos (loan) | 2025–26 | Cypriot First Division | 24 | 0 | 3 | 0 | 0 | 0 | 1 (Note: Appearance in Cypriot Super Cup) | 0 | 28 | 0 |
| Career total | | | 78 | 0 | 7 | 0 | 7 | 1 | 1 | 0 | 93 | 1 |

=== International ===
As of match played 4 June 2026

Appearances and goals by national team and year
| National team | Year | Apps | Goals |
|---|---|---|---|
| Serbia | 2025 | 4 | 0 |
| Serbia | 2026 | 4 | 0 |
| Total | | 8 | 0 |

== Honours ==
Pafos

- Cypriot Cup: 2025–26
