= 2023–24 Red Star Belgrade season =

Red Star Belgrade
2023–24 season
- President: Svetozar Mijailović
- Manager: Barak Bakhar (until 20 December); Vladan Milojević (from 22 December)
- Stadium: Rajko Mitić Stadium
- Serbian SuperLiga: 1st
- Serbian Cup: Winners
- UEFA Champions League: Group stage
- Top goalscorer: League: Cherif Ndiaye; Peter Olayinka (11 each); All: Cherif Ndiaye (15 goals)
- Highest home attendance: League: 48,211 (9 March 2024 v Partizan, R24); All: 49,443 (13 December 2023 v Manchester City, CL GS)
- Lowest home attendance: League: 6,027 (9 December 2023 v Mladost, R18); All: 1,200 (6 December 2023 v Radnički Niš, Serbian Cup R2)
- Average home league attendance: 16354
| Home colours | Away colours | Third colours |
- All statistics correct as of 25 May 2024.

The 2023–24 Red Star Belgrade season was the club's 18th in the Serbian SuperLiga and 78th consecutive season in topflight of Yugoslav and Serbian football. The club participated in the Serbian SuperLiga, Serbian Cup and UEFA Champions League.

== Summary ==
=== Pre-season ===
The first signings for this season were free transfers of Nigerian international winger Peter Olayinka on 9 January and New Zealand international midfielder Marko Stamenić on 6 February. Olayinka spent last five seasons with the Czech powerhouse Slavia Prague and joined the club on a three-year-long contract with an option for a fourth year. And Stamenic, who spent last three seasons with the Danish side Copenhagen, will be joining the club on a four-year-long contract.

On 19 May the club announced that the head coach for this season will be Israeli manager and former footballer Barak Bakhar. Previously he managed Israeli club Maccabi Haifa with whom he won last three Israeli Premier League titles and qualified for 2022–23 UEFA Champions League by eliminating Red Star in play-off round. Bakhar signed a three-year-long contract with the club.

On 13 June Serbian defender Radovan Pankov left the club after four seasons. He joined Polish powerhouse Legia Warsaw on a 3-year contract.

On 16 June two more players left the club. Serbian midfielder and product of club's youth academy Veljko Nikolić left the club to join Cypriot champions Aris Limassol. Nikolić was member of the first team for four seasons, during which he won four SuperLiga and three Serbian cup titles. In total he had 82 appearances and scored 10 goals. Second player to leave was Serbian forward Aleksandar Pešić who moved to the Hungarian powerhouse Ferencvárosi. This ended his second spell at the club, for which he won two Serbian SuperLiga and one Serbian cup in total while appearing in 91 matches and scoring 45 goals.

On 19 June the club announced that they will be returning Serbian midfielder Jovan Šljivić from a loan. He also signed a new three-year-long contract with the club. Šljivić, who is a product of club's youth system, spent last season playing at Grafičar.

On 20 June the club announced the transfer of Ivorian international forward Jean-Philippe Krasso on a free transfer from the French side Saint-Étienne. Krasso signed four-year-long contract with the club.

On 21 June the club announced the transfer of Ghanaian international midfielder Edmund Addo on a free transfer from the Serbian side Spartak Subotica. Addo signed four-year-long contract with the club.

On 22 June the club announced the transfer of Israeli international goalkeeper Omri Glazer for an estimated transfer fee of €1,200,000. Glazer arrived from the Israeli side Hapoel Be'er Sheva where he won goalkeeper of the season in the Israeli Premier League for two consecutive years. He signed three-year-long contract with the club with the one-year extension option.

On 4 July Canadian international goalkeeper Milan Borjan left the club after being first goalkeeper for the previous six seasons. In that time he won six consecutive Serbian SuperLiga's and three Serbian Cups making him one of the most decorated players in club history and placing him on the ninth player on the all-time appearances list. Borjan left on the one-year-long loan to the Slovak champions Slovan Bratislava.

On 23 July Serbian international defender and product of club's youth academy Strahinja Eraković left the club after three seasons in which he had 103 caps for the club and won 3 Serbian SuperLiga and 3 Serbian Cup titles. He joined Russian side Zenit on a four-year-long contract for an estimated transfer fee of €8,000,000. On the same day the club announced signing of a Serbian winger Uroš Kabić on a four-year-long contract. He arrived at the club from Serbian side Vojvodina for an estimated fee of €800,000.

On 24 July Australian international defender Miloš Degenek returned to the club for his third spell. He arrived from US side Columbus Crew for an estimated fee of €500,000 and signed two-year-long contract with the club with an option for one year extension.

On 28 July Serbian midfielder Nikola Knežević, who is the product of the club's youth academy, was promoted to the first squad after being loaned to Grafičar and Napredak during the last two seasons. He also signed a new four-year-long contract until summer of 2027.

=== August ===
In Serbian SuperLiga Red Star played five matches, winning the first four and losing the fifth one against Voždovac. That defeat ended their record breaking undefeated run in Serbian SuperLiga of 65 games since October 2021. At the end of the month Red Star was second placed team in the league, with one point behind TSC.

By winning previous season Serbian SuperLiga the club qualified for the group stage of 2023–24 UEFA Champions League. This will be the fourth time in the club's history that they will play in the Champions League group stage. On the draw that was held on 31 August the club was drawn into Group G together with current Champions League winners and English champions Manchester City with whom they will play for the first time, German DFB-Pokal winners RB Leipzig with whom they will also play for the first time and Swiss champions Young Boys with whom they played two times before.

On 22 August Serbian veteran midfielder Slavoljub Srnić on a free transfer and joined Cypriot side AEL Limassol. This ended his third spell at the club for which he played 208 games in total, scored 22 goals, won 6 Serbian SuperLiga titles and 3 Serbian Cup titles.

Also on 22 August Georgian international defender Irakli Azarovi left the after just one season in order to join Ukrainian side Shakhtar Donetsk for an estimated fee of around €3,000,000. During his stay at the club he played 26 games and won Serbian SuperLiga and Serbian Cup.

On 23 August Serbian defender and product of the club's youth academy Andrej Đurić returned to the club after two seasons playing for the Slovenian side Domžale. He signed four-year-long contract with an option for one year extension.

=== September ===
In Serbian SuperLiga Red Star played three games, with two more games being postponed including first eternal derby of this season. Two of those games ended with a win and one with the defeat. At the end of the month the club dropped to third place on the table, four points behind TSC and Partizan.

The club also started their Champions League run with an away game defeat against reigning European champions Manchester City.

On 1 September Serbian defender and product of the club's youth academy Stefan Leković joined Spanish side Villarreal on a season long loan with an option to buy at the end of the season.

On 4 September Burkinabé international defender Nasser Djiga arrived at the club on a year long loan from Swiss side Basel with a buy out option.

On 12 September Serbian defender Marko Gobeljić left the club after six seasons during which he gathered 183 caps, scored 11 goals and won 6 Serbian SuperLiga and 3 Serbian Cup titles. He joined Greek side Kifisia on a free transfer.

On 14 September Korean international midfielder Hwang In-beom arrived at the club for a record breaking transfer of an estimated €5,500,000 from Greek side Olympiacos and signed four-years-long contract with the club.

On 15 September Senegalese forward Cherif Ndiaye joined the club from Turkish side Adana Demirspor and signed three-years-long deal with an option for the fourth year.

=== October ===
In Serbian SuperLiga Red Star won all three games they played, witch brought them back to the second place on the table, seven points behind leading Partizan.

In Champions League the club played two games, a draw against Young Boys at home and a loss against RB Leipzig in an away game. This tied them with the Young Boys at the third place with one point each.

Draw for the first round of Serbian Cup was held on 11 October. Red Star were drawn to play an away game against Trayal. The game was originally scheduled to be played on 1 November, but it was rescheduled to 18 October. Red Star won the game 6–0 and qualified for the Round of 16.

=== November ===
In Serbian SuperLiga Red Star won all three games they played, witch kept them at the second place on the table, three points behind leading Partizan.

In Champions League the club lost both games it played, against RB Leipzig at home and Young Boys in an away game. This secured them last place in the group with one game remaining.

Draw for the Round of 16 of the Serbian Cup was held on 7 November and Red Star were drawn to play a home game against Radnički Niš. Game is scheduled to be played on 6 December

=== December ===
In Serbian SuperLiga Red Star ended first half of the championship with three wins and a 1–2 defeat against Partizan in the Eternal derby. This kept them at the second place on the table, one behind leading Partizan.

In Champions League the club lost its last game of the season against Manchester City at home, ending their run at the last place of the group.

Red Star played second round of Serbian Cup against Radnički Niš and won 5–0. On 25 December quarter-finals draw took place on which Red Star was drawn against OFK Vršac in a home game that will be played on 4 April 2024.

On 17 December the club signed new contract with young fullback Kosta Nedeljković until the summer of 2027.

On 20 December, after the loss in the Eternal derby, Israeli coach Barak Bakhar was sacked after just six months. His replacement was announced two days later, on 22 December - Serbian coach Vladan Milojević. This will be Milojević's second spell at the club, after previously being Red Star's manager for two seasons between 2017 and 2019. In his first tenure he won two Serbian SuperLiga titles. Milojević joined the club on a 2 1/2-year contract.

=== January ===
The club will organize mid-season training camp between 15 January and 2 February in Paphos on Cyprus during which they will play five friendly games.

Five of the club's players received call-ups to their national team squads for the continental championships that will be played at the start of this year. Nasser Djiga, Kings Kangwa, Osman Bukari and Jean-Philippe Krasso will play at the 2023 Africa Cup of Nations while Hwang In-beom will play at the 2023 AFC Asian Cup. Kangwa represented Zambia in all three group stage matches, scored one goal and was eliminated after ending on the third place of the group. Bukari represented Ghana in two games and was also eliminated in the group stage. Djiga played in one game for Burkina Faso and was eliminated in round of 16.

At the start of the year Argentine right-back Alex Vigo returned to River Plate after his loan at the club expired and Red Star decided not to activate his buy-out option. He was at the club for a year, during which he gathered 16 caps and scored 3 goals.

On 10 January club announced that they will be returning Serbian defender Viktor Radojević back from the loan at Grafičar. He is the product of the club's youth academy and this will be his first time playing for the first squad.

On 14 January Serbian backup goalkeeper Nikola Vasiljević left the club after 4 1/2 years, most of which he spent on multiple loans. He joined Serbian side Radnički Niš on a free transfer.

On 22 January Serbian defender Kosta Nedeljković signed the contract with English side Aston Villa for an estimated fee of €9,000,000. He will remain part of the Red Star until the end of current season.

On 31 January Ghanaian midfielder Edmund Addo left the club in order to join Serbian side Radnički Niš on a six-months loan. Addo arrived at the club at the start of this season and failed to make a debut for the first team.

=== February ===
Serbian SuperLiga was resumed during February. Club played three games, and won all three of them. This kept them at the second place on the table, one point behind leading Partizan.

On 1 February Serbian winger Stefan Mitrović left the club in order to join the Italian side Hellas Verona for an estimated fee of €1,300,000. He spent season and a half at the club, winning the Double in the previous season.

On the same day two more players left the club on a loan until the end of the season. Zambian international midfielder Kings Kangwa was loaned to Belgian side Kortrijk for an estimated loan fee of €500,000 and the buy-out price of €1,000,000 at the end of the season. Kangwa was part of the club for season and a half, winning the Double in the previous season. Serbian midfielder Uroš Kabić was loaned to Italian side Torino with an agreed buy-out price of €2,000,000 at the end of the season. He joined the club at the start of this season.

On 2 February Serbian forward Uroš Sremčević joined the club on a three-years-long contract. He arrived from Mladost Lučani for the record breaking transfer between two Serbian clubs of an estimated €2,000,000.

On 19 February Serbian forward Jovan Mijatović left the club in order to join US side New York City FC for the undisclosed transfer fee estimated to be around €8,000,000.

== Players ==
Players and squad numbers last updated on 13 March 2024. Appearances include league matches only.
Note: Flags indicate national team as has been defined under FIFA eligibility rules. Players may hold more than one non-FIFA nationality.

| No. | Name | Nat | Position(s) | Date of birth (age) | Signed in | Contract ends | Signed from | Transfer fees | Apps. | Goals | Notes |
Goalkeepers
| 1 | Zoran Popović | (Serbia) | GK | 28 May 1988 (aged 35) | 2018 | 2024 | (Norway) Bodø/Glimt | €80k | 28 | 0 | |
| 18 | Omri Glazer | (Israel) | GK | 11 March 1996 (aged 27) | 2023 | 2026 | (Israel) Hapoel Be'er Sheva | €1.2m | 23 | 0 | |
| 77 | Ivan Guteša ^{U21} | (Serbia) | GK | 4 April 2002 (aged 21) | 2024 | 2026 | (Serbia) Grafičar Beograd | Free transfer | 0 | 0 | |
Defenders
| 2 | Kosta Nedeljković ^{U21} | (Serbia) | RB | 16 December 2005 (aged 17) | 2023 | 2024 | (England) Aston Villa | Loan | 12 | 0 | |
| 3 | Miloš Degenek | (Australia) | CB | 28 April 1994 (aged 29) | 2023 | 2025 | (United States) Columbus Crew | €500k | 85 | 2 | |
| 5 | Uroš Spajić | (Serbia) | CB | 13 February 1993 (aged 30) | 2022 | 2026 | (Turkey) Kasımpaşa | Free transfer | 35 | 3 | |
| 15 | Aleksandar Dragović | (Austria) | CB | 6 March 1991 (aged 32) | 2021 | 2024 | (Germany) Bayer Leverkusen | Free transfer | 88 | 6 | Captain |
| 19 | Nemanja Milunović | (Serbia) | CB | 31 May 1989 (aged 34) | 2022 | 2024 | (Turkey) Alanyaspor | €250k | 76 | 6 | |
| 23 | Milan Rodić | (Serbia) | LB | 2 April 1991 (aged 32) | 2017 | 2025 | (Russia) Krylia Sovetov | €250k | 170 | 11 | |
| 24 | Nasser Djiga ^{FGN U21} | (Burkina Faso) | CB | 15 November 2002 (aged 20) | 2023 | 2024 | (Switzerland) Basel | Loan | 13 | 0 | |
| 29 | Viktor Radojević ^{U21} | (Serbia) | LB | 14 July 2004 (aged 18) | 2024 | 2026 | (Serbia) Youth academy | N/A | 1 | 0 | |
| 70 | Ognjen Mimović ^{U21} | (Serbia) | RB | 17 August 2004 (aged 18) | 2024 | 2028 | (Serbia) Youth academy | N/A | 3 | 0 | |
| 76 | Lazar Nikolić | (Serbia) | RB | 1 August 1999 (aged 23) | 2022 | 2025 | (Serbia) Javor | Free transfer | 20 | 0 | |
Midfielders
| 4 | Mirko Ivanić | (Montenegro) | AM | 13 September 1993 (aged 29) | 2019 | 2025 | (Belarus) BATE Borisov | €1.3m | 147 | 46 | |
| 6 | Marko Stamenić ^{U21} | (New Zealand) | DM | 19 February 2002 (aged 21) | 2023 | 2026 | (Denmark) Copenhagen | Free transfer | 17 | 0 | |
| 7 | Jovan Šljivić ^{U21} | (Serbia) | AM | 14 October 2005 (aged 17) | 2022 | 2026 | (Serbia) Youth academy | N/A | 8 | 0 | |
| 8 | Guélor Kanga | (Gabon) | AM | 1 September 1990 (aged 32) | 2020 | 2025 | (Czech Republic) Sparta Prague | Free transfer | 146 | 34 | |
| 10 | Aleksandar Katai | (Serbia) | LW | 6 February 1991 (aged 32) | 2020 | 2024 | (United States) LA Galaxy | Free transfer | 157 | 84 | |
| 30 | Osman Bukari | (Ghana) | RW | 13 December 1998 (aged 24) | 2022 | 2026 | (Belgium) Gent | €3m | 51 | 19 | |
| 33 | Srđan Mijailović | (Serbia) | DM | 10 November 1993 (aged 29) | 2022 | 2025 | (Serbia) Čukarički | Free transfer | 97 | 1 | |
| 37 | Vladimir Lučić ^{U21} | (Serbia) | LW | 28 June 2002 (aged 21) | 2022 | 2025 | (Serbia) Youth academy | N/A | 25 | 1 | |
| 40 | Jovan Mituljikić ^{U21} | (Serbia) | AM | 20 January 2003 (aged 20) | 2023 | 2025 | (Serbia) Youth academy | N/A | 0 | 0 | |
| 41 | Nikola Knežević ^{U21} | (Serbia) | CM | 10 March 2003 (aged 20) | 2022 | 2027 | (Serbia) Youth academy | N/A | 3 | 0 | |
| 45 | Nikola Mituljikić ^{U21} | (Serbia) | RW | 20 January 2003 (aged 20) | 2023 | 2025 | (Serbia) Youth academy | N/A | 7 | 0 | |
| 55 | Andrija Maksimović ^{U21} | (Serbia) | AM | 5 June 2007 (aged 16) | 2023 | 2025 | (Serbia) Youth academy | N/A | 0 | 0 | |
| 66 | Hwang In-beom ^{FGN} | (South Korea) | CM | 20 September 1996 (aged 26) | 2023 | 2027 | (Greece) Olympiacos | €5.5m | 17 | 2 | |
Forwards
| 9 | Cherif Ndiaye ^{FGN} | (Senegal) | CF | 23 January 1996 (aged 27) | 2023 | 2026 | (Turkey) Adana Demirspor | €4.0m | 19 | 4 | |
| 14 | Peter Olayinka ^{FGN} | (Nigeria) | LW | 18 November 1995 (aged 27) | 2023 | 2026 | (Czech Republic) Slavia Prague | Free transfer | 24 | 5 | |
| 17 | Jean-Philippe Krasso | (Ivory Coast) | CF | 17 July 1997 (aged 25) | 2023 | 2027 | (France) Saint-Étienne | Free transfer | 19 | 7 | |
| 31 | Uroš Sremčević ^{U21} | (Serbia) | CF | 24 April 2006 (aged 17) | 2024 | 2027 | (Serbia) Mladost Lučani | €2.0m | 2 | 0 | |

- Note: SuperLiga imposes a requirement on under-21 players (marked as ^{U21}) and foreign players (marked as ^{FGN}). There must be at least one ^{U21} and no more than four ^{FGN} players on the pitch at any time.

== Pre-season and friendlies ==
| 26 June 2023 Friendly | Sloboda Užice (Serbia) | 1–3 | (Serbia) Red Star | Užice, Serbia |
| 18:00 | Lazović 32' | Report | Mijatović 22'; Katai 42'; Gobeljić 63' | Stadium: Radomir Antić Stadium |

| 29 June 2023 Friendly | Borac Banja Luka (Bosnia and Herzegovina) | 0–2 | (Serbia) Red Star | Užice, Serbia |
| 18:00 | | Report | Mitrović 8'; Lučić 69' | Stadium: Radomir Antić Stadium; Referee: Predrag Simić |

| 4 July 2023 Match TV Cup | Zenit (Russia) | 1–2 | (Serbia) Red Star | Saint Petersburg, Russia |
| 18:30 | Queiroz 62' | Report | Ivanić 40'; Krasso 88' (pen.) | Stadium: Krestovsky Stadium; Attendance: 17,970; Referee: Aleksei Amelin |

| 8 July 2023 Match TV Cup | Neftçi (Azerbaijan) | 0–4 | (Serbia) Red Star | Saint Petersburg, Russia |
| 18:30 | | Report | Ivanić 9'; Mitrović 18'; Bukari 45'; Šljivić 81' | Stadium: Smena Stadium; Attendance: 1,700; Referee: Artem Lyubimov |

| 12 July 2023 Match TV Cup | Fenerbahçe (Turkey) | 1–3 | (Serbia) Red Star | Saint Petersburg, Russia |
| 18:30 | João Pedro 79' | Report | Olayinka 1'; Ivanić 38'; Lučić 82' | Stadium: Smena Stadium; Attendance: 3,075; Referee: Evgeni Kukulyak |

| 22 July 2023 Friendly | Red Star (Serbia) | 3–0 | (Serbia) TSC | Belgrade, Serbia |
| 20:00 | Ivanić 8'; Olayinka 27'; Krasso 60' | Report | | Stadium: Rajko Mitić Stadium; Attendance: 0 Referee: Ivan Stamenić |

| 26 July 2023 Friendly | Red Star (Serbia) | 5–0 | (Italy) Fiorentina | Belgrade, Serbia |
| 20:00 | Olayinka 9', 23'; Krasso 11'; Ivanić 14'; Bukari 27' (pen.) | Report | | Stadium: Rajko Mitić Stadium; Attendance: 36,882; Referee: Miloš Milanović |

| 17 January 2024 Friendly | Akritas Chlorakas (Cyprus) | 2–3 | (Serbia) Red Star | Paphos, Cyprus |
| 16:00 | Fratea 34'; Thierno 37' | Report | Katai 8'; Mitrović 60'; Knežević 89' | Referee: Timur Arslanbekov |

| 20 January 2024 Friendly | Zalaegerszegi (Hungary) | 0–1 | (Serbia) Red Star | Paphos, Cyprus |
| 13:00 | | Report | Šljivić 25' | Referee: Timur Arslanbekov |

| 24 January 2024 Friendly | Red Star (Serbia) | 3–1 | (Serbia) Spartak Subotica | Paphos, Cyprus |
| 15:30 | Lučić 23'; Nikolić 46'; Mijatović 66' | Report | Ubiparip 88' | Referee: Timur Arslanbekov |

| 28 January 2024 Friendly | Red Star (Serbia) | 2–0 | (Serbia) Mladost Lučani | Paphos, Cyprus |
| 15:30 | Šljivić 16'; Ndiaye 25' | Report | | Referee: Timur Arslanbekov |

| 1 February 2024 Friendly | Red Star (Serbia) | Abandoned | (Bulgaria) Botev Vratsa | Paphos, Cyprus |
| 16:00 | Ndiaye 8', 43' | Report | Barbosa 37' | Referee: Timur Arslanbekov |

| 23 March 2024 Friendly | Red Star (Serbia) | 1-0 | (Russia) Zenit | Belgrade, Serbia |
| 19:00 | Knežević 82' | Report | | Stadium: Rajko Mitić Stadium; Attendance: 42,771; Referee: Jovan Šegrt |

== Competitions ==
=== Overview ===
| Competition | Record | | | | | | | |
| Competition | P | W | D | L | GF | GA | GD | Win % |
|---|---|---|---|---|---|---|---|---|
| Serbian SuperLiga | 37 | 31 | 3 | 3 | 94 | 28 | +66 | 83.78 |
| Serbian Cup | 5 | 5 | 0 | 0 | 18 | 1 | +17 | 100.00 |
| UEFA Champions League | 6 | 0 | 1 | 5 | 7 | 15 | −8 | 0.00 |
| Total | 48 | 36 | 4 | 8 | 119 | 44 | +75 | 75.00 |

=== Serbian SuperLiga ===
==== Season results summary ====
| Overall | | | | | | | | Home | | | | | | Away | | | | | |
| Pld | W | D | L | GF | GA | GD | Pts | W | D | L | GF | GA | GD | W | D | L | GF | GA | GD |
|---|---|---|---|---|---|---|---|---|---|---|---|---|---|---|---|---|---|---|---|
| 25 | 20 | 2 | 3 | 62 | 22 | +40 | 62 | 10 | 2 | 0 | 32 | 9 | +23 | 10 | 0 | 3 | 30 | 13 | +17 |

==== Season results round by round ====
| Round | 1 | 2 | 3 | 4 | 5 | 6 | 7 | 8 | 9 | 10 | 11 | 12 | 13 | 14 | 15 | 16 | 17 | 18 | 19 | 20 | 21 | 22 | 23 | 24 | 25 | 26 | 27 | 28 | 29 | 30 |
|---|---|---|---|---|---|---|---|---|---|---|---|---|---|---|---|---|---|---|---|---|---|---|---|---|---|---|---|---|---|---|
| Result | W | W | W | W | L | W | L | D | L | W | W | W | W | W | W | W | W | W | W | W | W | W | W | D | W | W | W | W | W | W |
| Position | 1 | 1 | 1 | 1 | 2 | 2 | 3 | 3 | 3 | 3 | 2 | 2 | 2 | 2 | 2 | 2 | 2 | 1 | 2 | 2 | 2 | 2 | 2 | 2 | 1 | 1 | 1 | 1 | 1 | 1 |

W = Win; D = Draw; L = Loss

==== Regular season league table ====
| Pos | Team | Pld | W | D | L | GF | GA | GD | Pts | Qualification |
|---|---|---|---|---|---|---|---|---|---|---|
| 1 | Red Star Belgrade | 30 | 25 | 2 | 3 | 77 | 22 | +55 | 77 | Qualification for the Championship round |
| 2 | Partizan | 30 | 22 | 4 | 4 | 66 | 35 | +31 | 70 | Qualification for the Championship round |
| 3 | TSC | 30 | 17 | 9 | 4 | 57 | 29 | +28 | 60 | Qualification for the Championship round |
| 4 | Vojvodina | 30 | 14 | 8 | 8 | 49 | 42 | +7 | 50 | Qualification for the Championship round |
| 5 | Radnički 1923 | 30 | 16 | 2 | 12 | 46 | 46 | 0 | 50 | Qualification for the Championship round |

Source: SuperLiga (in Serbian)
Rules for classification: 1) Points; 2) Head-to-head points; 3) Head-to-head goal difference; 4) Head-to-head goals scored; 5) Head-to-head away goals scored (if two teams tied); 6) Goal difference; 7) Goals scored; 8) Fair play ranking; 9) Draw.

==== Regular season matches ====
| 30 July 2023 1 | Red Star Belgrade | 5–0 | Vojvodina | Rajko Mitić Stadium, Belgrade |
| 20:00 | Krasso 13' (pen.), 51'; Milosavljević 45' (o.g.); Lučić 70'; Bukari 80' | Report | | Attendance: 16,213; Referee: Živković Aleksandar |

| 6 August 2023 2 | Red Star Belgrade | 4–0 | Napredak | Rajko Mitić Stadium, Belgrade |
| 16:55 | Krasso 5' (pen.), 72'; Bukari 35'; Mijailović 37' | Report | | Attendance: 5,171; Referee: Nikola Đorđević |

| 11 August 2023 3 | Mladost | 1–4 | Red Star Belgrade | Mladost Stadium, Lučani |
| 18:55 | Veličković 13' | Report | Mitrović 4'; Olayinka 35'; Krasso 62'; Mijatović 87' | Attendance: 7,000; Referee: Dejan Trifković |

| 19 August 2023 4 | Red Star Belgrade | 3–0 | Spartak | Rajko Mitić Stadium, Belgrade |
| 20:30 | Bukari 20'; Bogićević 25' (o.g.); Manojlović 45' (o.g.) | Report | | Attendance: 14,717; Referee: Predrag Janjuš |

| 26 August 2023 5 | Voždovac | 3–2 | Red Star Belgrade | Voždovac Stadium, Belgrade |
| 19:00 | Burmaz 5'; Nešković 43'; Teodorović 61' | Report | Rodić 74'; Kanga 90' (pen.) | Attendance: 1,800; Referee: Stanko Ostraćanin |

| 2 September 2023 6 | Red Star Belgrade | 2–1 | Novi Pazar | Rajko Mitić Stadium, Belgrade |
| 20:00 | Dragović 8'; Kanga 80' (pen.) | Report | Jovanović 81' | Attendance: 31,700; Referee: Nikola Radaković |

| 16 September 2023 7 | Čukarički | 2–1 | Red Star Belgrade | Čukarički Stadium, Belgrade |
| 18:05 | Docić 24' (pen.); Adetunji 75' | Report | Krasso 48' (pen.) | Attendance: 3,500; Referee: Miloš Milanović |

| 1 November 2023 8 | Red Star Belgrade | 1–1 | TSC | Rajko Mitić Stadium, Belgrade |
| 19:00 | Katai 84' | Report | Đakovac 90' | Attendance: 8,537; Referee: Milan Mitić |
Note: Game was originally scheduled on 23 September, but was postponed due to both club's international games.

| 20 December 2023 9 | Partizan | 2–1 | Red Star Belgrade | Partizan Stadium, Belgrade |
| 18:00 | Natcho 41' (pen.); Saldanha 66' | Report | Ndiaye 71' | Attendance: 12,000; Referee: Nenad Minaković |
Note: Game was originally scheduled on 27 September, but was postponed due to mourning day and security concerns after Banjska attack on 24 September.

| 30 September 2023 10 | Red Star Belgrade | 1–0 | Radnički Niš | Rajko Mitić Stadium, Belgrade |
| 18:05 | Ivanić 13' | Report | | Attendance: 9,152; Referee: Pavle Ilić |

| 8 October 2023 11 | Radnički 1923 | 0–3 | Red Star Belgrade | Čika Dača Stadium, Kragujevac |
| 15:00 | Gluščević 21'; Chinedu 37'; Zorić 90' | Report | Olayinka 29', 33'; Ivanić 44', 66' | Attendance: 5,000; Referee: Novak Simović |
Note: Match was originally finished with Red Star's 3–4 victory, but was registered with official result 0–3 due to the administrative mistake made by Radnički 1923.

| 21 October 2023 12 | Red Star Belgrade | 3–2 | Javor | Rajko Mitić Stadium, Belgrade |
| 18:30 | Skoko 16' (o.g.); Olayinka 56'; Mijatović 79' | Report | Djiga 53' (o.g.); Bosić 65' | Attendance: 7,022; Referee: Nenad Minaković |

| 28 October 2023 13 | IMT | 1–2 | Red Star Belgrade | Voždovac Stadium, Belgrade |
| 18:30 | Radočaj 72' | Report | Krasso 22'; Olayinka 26' | Attendance: 1,500; Referee: Šegrt Jovan |

| 4 November 2023 14 | Red Star Belgrade | 3–1 | Radnik | Rajko Mitić Stadium, Belgrade |
| 18:00 | Mijatović 19'; Spajić 54'; Kanga 90' (pen.) | Report | Tomašević 70' | Attendance: 5,000; Referee: Nikolić Danilo |

| 11 November 2023 15 | Železničar | 1–2 | Red Star Belgrade | Stadion SC Mladost, Pančevo |
| 18:00 | Romanić 16' | Report | Ivanić 61'; Mijatović 76' | Attendance: 2,300; Referee: Ivković Marko |

| 25 November 2023 16 | Vojvodina | 1–2 | Red Star Belgrade | Karađorđe Stadium, Novi Sad |
| 16:00 | Milosavljević 13' | Report | Bukari 3', 27' | Referee: Milan Ilić |

| 3 December 2023 17 | Napredak | 0–1 | Red Star Belgrade | Mladost Stadium, Kruševac |
| 15:00 | | Report | Olayinka 7' | Referee: Jovan Šegrt |

| 9 December 2023 18 | Red Star Belgrade | 3–1 | Mladost | Rajko Mitić Stadium, Belgrade |
| 16:00 | Katai 8' (pen.); Mijatović 68'; Hwang 89' | Report | Sremčević 10' | Attendance: 5,027; Referee: Lazar Lukić |

| 16 December 2023 19 | Spartak | 1–4 | Red Star Belgrade | Subotica City Stadium, Subotica |
| 16:00 | Todoroski 55' | Report | Mijatović 26', 57', 90'; Katai 53' | Attendance: 3,000; Referee: Pavle Ilić |

| 10 February 2024 20 | Red Star Belgrade | 2–1 | Voždovac | Rajko Mitić Stadium, Belgrade |
| 16:30 | Rodić 9'; Olayinka 16' | Report | Nešković 86' | Attendance: 26,340; Referee: Jovan Šegrt |

| 17 February 2024 21 | Novi Pazar | 0–3 | Red Star Belgrade | Novi Pazar City Stadium, Novi Pazar |
| 14:00 | | Report | Dragović 10'; Kanga 40' (pen.); Ndiaye 81' | Attendance: 0 Referee: Danilo Nikolić |

| 24 February 2024 22 | Red Star Belgrade | 3–0 | Čukarički | Rajko Mitić Stadium, Belgrade |
| 16:00 | Kanga 9' (pen.); Ndiaye 36'; Bukari 75' (pen.) | Report | | Attendance: 14,348; Referee: Marko Ivković |

| 2 March 2024 23 | TSC | 1–3 | Red Star Belgrade | TSC Arena, Bačka Topola |
| 16:00 | Pantović 62' | Report | Kanga 36' (pen.); Bukari 64'; Hwang 85' (pen.) | Referee: Milan Ilić |

| 9 March 2024 24 | Red Star Belgrade | 2–2 | Partizan | Rajko Mitić Stadium, Belgrade |
| 17:00 | Spajić 44'; Ndiaye 69' | Report | Saldanha 45'; Kalulu 49' | Attendance: 48,211; Referee: Pavle Ilić |

| 13 March 2024 25 | Radnički Niš | 0–2 | Red Star Belgrade | Čair Stadium, Niš |
| 19:00 | | Report | Kanga 34'; Katai 87' | Attendance: 6,000; Referee: Marko Ivković |

| 17 March 2024 26 | Red Star Belgrade | 5–0 | Radnički 1923 | Rajko Mitić Stadium, Belgrade |
| 16:00 | Stamenić 10'; Ndiaye 20', 50'; Hwang 68'; Katai 76' | Report | | Attendance: 18,241; Referee: Šegrt Jovan |

| 30 March 2024 27 | Javor | 0–3 | Red Star Belgrade | Javor Stadium, Ivanjica |
| 16:00 | | Report | Kanga 39' (pen.); Hwang 44'; Mijailović 82' | Attendance: 3,000; Referee: Nikolić Danilo |

| 3 April 2024 28 | Red Star Belgrade | 2–0 | IMT | Rajko Mitić Stadium, Belgrade |
| 19:00 | Šljivić 4'; Rodić 48' | Report | | Attendance: 7,284; Referee: Milanović Miloš |

| 7 April 2024 29 | Radnik | 0–2 | Red Star Belgrade | Surdulica City Stadium, Surdulica |
| 16:00 | | Report | Katai 75', 88' | Referee: Ostraćanin Stanko |

| 14 April 2024 30 | Red Star Belgrade | 3–0 | Železničar | Rajko Mitić Stadium, Belgrade |
| 17:00 | Ivanić 45'; Ndiaye 73'; Olayinka 87' | Report | | Attendance: 7,217; Referee: Danilo Nikolić |

==== Season results round by round ====
| Round | 1 | 2 | 3 | 4 | 5 | 6 | 7 |
|---|---|---|---|---|---|---|---|
| Result | W | D | W | W | W | W | W |
| Position | 1 | 1 | 1 | 1 | 1 | 1 | 1 |

W = Win; D = Draw; L = Loss

==== Championship round league table ====
| Pos | Team | Pld | W | D | L | GF | GA | GD | Pts | Qualification |
|---|---|---|---|---|---|---|---|---|---|---|
| 1 | Red Star Belgrade (C) | 37 | 31 | 3 | 3 | 94 | 28 | +66 | 96 | Qualification for the Champions League play-off round |
| 2 | Partizan | 37 | 24 | 6 | 7 | 80 | 48 | +32 | 78 | Qualification for the Champions League second qualifying round |
| 3 | TSC | 37 | 22 | 9 | 6 | 75 | 39 | +36 | 75 | Qualification for the Europa League play-off round (Note: The winner of the 2023–24 Serbian Cup, Red Star Belgrade, has already qualified for 2024–25 UEFA Champions League, so the berth is awarded to third place TSC.) |
| 4 | Vojvodina | 37 | 17 | 10 | 10 | 62 | 50 | +12 | 61 | Qualification for the Europa League second qualifying round |
| 5 | Radnički 1923 | 37 | 19 | 4 | 14 | 64 | 61 | +3 | 61 | Qualification for the Conference League second qualifying round |

Source: SuperLiga (in Serbian)
Rules for classification: 1) Points; 2) Points in regular season; 3) Head-to-head points in regular season; 4) Head-to-head goal difference in regular season; 5) Head-to-head goals scored in regular season; 6) Head-to-head away goals scored in regular season (if two teams tied); 7) Goal difference; 8) Goals scored; 9) Fair play ranking; 10) Drawing of lots.
(C) Champions

==== Championship round matches ====
| 20 April 2024 31 | Red Star Belgrade | 3–2 | Partizan | Rajko Mitić Stadium, Belgrade |
| 18:00 (UTC+2) | Kanga 16' (pen.); Ndiaye 90'; Katai 90+9' (pen.); Krasso (yellow card) 90+12'; Glazer (yellow card) 90+12' | Report | Baždar 11'; Owusu (yellow card) 40'; Severina 57'; Kovačević (yellow card) 82'; Kalulu (yellow card) 90+1'; Marković (yellow card) 90+7' | Attendance: 37,465; Referee: Milos Milanovic |

| 30 April 2023 32 | Vojvodina | 0–0 | Red Star Belgrade | Karađorđe Stadium, Vojvodina |
| 17:00 (UTC+2) | Radulović (yellow card) 33'; Lazarević (yellow card) 76' | Report | Dragović (yellow card) 17'; Stamenić (yellow card) 38'; Mimović (yellow card) 44'; Olayinka (yellow card) 70' | Attendance: 9,500; Referee: Novak Simović |

| 3 May 2024 33 | Red Star Belgrade | 2–1 | TSC | Rajko Mitić Stadium, Belgrade |
| 19:00 (UTC+2) | Olayinka 55'; Ndiaye 75' | Report | Petrović (yellow card) 50'; Stanić (yellow card) 52'; Milosavljević 60' | Attendance: 4,000; Referee: Milan Ilic |

| 8 May 2024 34 | Mladost Lučani | 0–1 | Red Star Belgrade | SRC MR Radoš Milovanović, Lučani |
| 18:30 (UTC+2) | Andrić (yellow card) 37'; Tumbasević (yellow card) 53' | Report | Dragović 68' | Attendance: 1,500; Referee: Stefan Jeknić |

| 12 May 2024 35 | Red Star Belgrade | 3–2 | Radnički 1923 | Rajko Mitić Stadium, Belgrade |
| 18:30 (UTC+2) | Ndiaye 20', 29'; Spajić (yellow card) 22'; In-beom 36', (yellow card) 90+3' | Report | Dadić (yellow card) 11'; Đurić 25'; Sahli 39'; Bukumira (yellow card) 77'; Mitrović (yellow card) 79'; Milošević (yellow card) 84' | Attendance: 4,000; Referee: Nenad Minaković |

| 16 May 2024 36 | Napredak Kruševac | 0–4 | Red Star Belgrade | Mladost Stadium, Kruševac |
| 19:00 (UTC+2) | Stevanović (yellow card) 37'; Mihajlović (yellow card) 71' | Report | Knežević 8'; Sremčević 42', 68'; Katai 45+1' | Attendance: 3,500; Referee: Nikola Đorđević |

| 25 May 2024 37 | Red Star Belgrade | 4–1 | Čukarički | Rajko Mitić Stadium, Belgrade |
| 19:00 (UTC+2) | Olayinka 32', 55'; Djiga 80'; Kanga (yellow card) 82'; Krasson 90' | Report | Rogan 18' | Attendance: 36,891; Referee: Jelena Cvetković |

=== Serbian Cup ===
==== First round ====
| 18 October 2023 | Trayal | 0–6 | Red Star | Mladost Stadium, Kruševac |
| 15:00 | | Report | Spasojević 8' (o.g.); Ndiaye 51'; Šljivić 76', 90'; Knežević 77'; Mijatović 89' | Referee: Nikola Petrović |
Note: The game was originally scheduled to be played on 1 November, but it was rescheduled to 18 October.

==== Round of 16 ====
| 6 December 2023 | Red Star | 5–0 | Radnički Niš | Rajko Mitić Stadium, Belgrade |
| 18:00 | Knežević 11'; Katai 17'; Ndiaye 19'; Lučić 26'; Krasso 38' (pen.) | Report | | Attendance: 1,200; Referee: Nikola Radaković |

==== Quarter-finals ====
| 10 April 2024 | Red Star | 3–0 | OFK Vršac | Rajko Mitić Stadium, Belgrade |
| 19:00 | Katai 6'; Ndiaye 65'; Bukari 82' | Report | | Attendance: 5,339; Referee: Stefan Jenkić |

==== Semi-finals ====
| 24 April 2024 | Red Star | 2–0 | Partizan | Belgrade |
| 19:00 | Olayinka 27', 29' | Report | | Stadium: Red Star Stadium; Attendance: 25,000; Referee: Miloš Milanović |

==== Final ====
| 21 May 2024 | Red Star | 2–1 | Vojvodina | Loznica |
| 20:15 | Ivanić 37'; Spajić 66' | Report | Vukanović 90+8' | Stadium: Lagator Stadium; Attendance: 7,900; Referee: Milan Ilić |

=== UEFA Champions League ===
==== Group stage ====
| Pos | Team | Pld | W | D | L | GF | GA | GD | Pts | Qualification | MCI | RBL | YB | RSB |
|---|---|---|---|---|---|---|---|---|---|---|---|---|---|---|
| 1 | (England) Manchester City | 6 | 6 | 0 | 0 | 18 | 7 | +11 | 18 | Advance to knockout phase | — | 3–2 | 3–0 | 3–1 |
| 2 | (Germany) RB Leipzig | 6 | 4 | 0 | 2 | 13 | 10 | +3 | 12 | Advance to knockout phase | 1–3 | — | 2–1 | 3–1 |
| 3 | (Switzerland) Young Boys | 6 | 1 | 1 | 4 | 7 | 13 | −6 | 4 | Transfer to Europa League | 1–3 | 1–3 | — | 2–0 |
| 4 | (Serbia) Red Star Belgrade | 6 | 0 | 1 | 5 | 7 | 15 | −8 | 1 | | 2–3 | 1–2 | 2–2 | — |

Source: UEFA
Rules for classification: Group stage tiebreakers

| 19 September 2023 | Manchester City (England) | 3–1 | (Serbia) Red Star | City of Manchester Stadium, Manchester |
| 21:00 (20:00 BST) | Álvarez 47', 60'; Rodri 73' | Report | Bukari 45' | Attendance: 50,204; Referee: João Pinheiro (Portugal) |

| 4 October 2023 | Red Star (Serbia) | 2–2 | (Switzerland) Young Boys | Rajko Mitić Stadium, Belgrade |
| 21:00 | Ndiaye 35'; Bukari 88' | Report | Ugrinić 48'; Itten 61' (pen.) | Attendance: 47,201; Referee: Willie Collum (Scotland) |

| 25 October 2023 | RB Leipzig (Germany) | 3–1 | (Serbia) Red Star | Red Bull Arena, Leipzig |
| 21:00 | Raum 12'; Simons 59'; Olmo 84' | Report | Stamenić 70' | Attendance: 42,209; Referee: José María Sánchez Martínez (Spain) |

| 7 November 2023 | Red Star (Serbia) | 1–2 | (Germany) RB Leipzig | Rajko Mitić Stadium, Belgrade |
| 21:00 | Henrichs 81' (o.g.) | Report | Simons 8'; Openda 77' | Attendance: 41,961; Referee: Daniele Orsato (Italy) |

| 28 November 2023 | Young Boys (Switzerland) | 2–0 | (Serbia) Red Star | Stadion Wankdorf, Bern |
| 21:00 | Nedeljković 8' (o.g.); Blum 29' | Report | | Attendance: 31,500; Referee: Danny Makkelie (Netherlands) |

| 13 December 2023 | Red Star (Serbia) | 2–3 | (England) Manchester City | Rajko Mitić Stadium, Belgrade |
| 18:45 | Hwang In-beom 76'; Katai 90+1' | Report | Hamilton 19'; Bobb 62'; Phillips 85' (pen.) | Attendance: 49,443; Referee: Aliyar Aghayev (Azerbaijan) |

== Squad ==
=== Squad statistics ===
| No. | Pos | Nat | Player | Total | | SuperLiga | | Cup | | Champions League | |
| No. | Pos | Nat | Player | Apps | Goals | Apps | Goals | Apps | Goals | Apps | Goals |
Goalkeepers
| 1 | GK | (Serbia) SRB | Zoran Popović | 3 | 0 | 2+1 | 0 | 0 | 0 | 0 | 0 |
| 18 | GK | (Israel) ISR | Omri Glazer | 31 | 0 | 23 | 0 | 2 | 0 | 6 | 0 |
| 77 | GK | (Serbia) SRB | Ivan Guteša | 0 | 0 | 0 | 0 | 0 | 0 | 0 | 0 |
Defenders
| 2 | DF | (Serbia) SRB | Kosta Nedeljković | 18 | 0 | 10+2 | 0 | 2 | 0 | 2+2 | 0 |
| 3 | DF | (Australia) AUS | Miloš Degenek | 8 | 0 | 4+2 | 0 | 0+1 | 0 | 0+1 | 0 |
| 5 | DF | (Serbia) SRB | Uroš Spajić | 19 | 2 | 12+4 | 2 | 2 | 0 | 1 | 0 |
| 15 | DF | (Austria) AUT | Aleksandar Dragović | 30 | 2 | 22 | 2 | 2 | 0 | 6 | 0 |
| 19 | DF | (Serbia) SRB | Nemanja Milunović | 2 | 0 | 0+2 | 0 | 0 | 0 | 0 | 0 |
| 23 | DF | (Serbia) SRB | Milan Rodić | 24 | 2 | 14+4 | 2 | 0 | 0 | 5+1 | 0 |
| 24 | DF | (Burkina Faso) BFA | Nasser Djiga | 19 | 0 | 11+2 | 0 | 0 | 0 | 6 | 0 |
| 29 | DF | (Serbia) SRB | Viktor Radojević | 1 | 0 | 0+1 | 0 | 0 | 0 | 0 | 0 |
| 40 | DF | (Serbia) SRB | Veljko Milosavljević | 1 | 0 | 0 | 0 | 1 | 0 | 0 | 0 |
| 70 | DF | (Serbia) SRB | Ognjen Mimović | 3 | 0 | 1+2 | 0 | 0 | 0 | 0 | 0 |
| 76 | DF | (Serbia) SRB | Lazar Nikolić | 14 | 0 | 4+8 | 0 | 2 | 0 | 0 | 0 |
Midfielders
| 4 | MF | (Montenegro) MNE | Mirko Ivanić | 22 | 2 | 12+4 | 2 | 1 | 0 | 5 | 0 |
| 6 | MF | (New Zealand) NZL | Marko Stamenić | 22 | 1 | 13+4 | 0 | 1 | 0 | 4 | 1 |
| 7 | MF | (Serbia) SRB | Jovan Šljivić | 10 | 2 | 2+6 | 0 | 1+1 | 2 | 0 | 0 |
| 8 | MF | (Gabon) GAB | Guélor Kanga | 23 | 7 | 13+7 | 7 | 0 | 0 | 2+1 | 0 |
| 10 | MF | (Serbia) SRB | Aleksandar Katai | 18 | 6 | 4+7 | 4 | 2 | 1 | 0+5 | 1 |
| 30 | MF | (Ghana) GHA | Osman Bukari | 28 | 9 | 19+3 | 7 | 0 | 0 | 5+1 | 2 |
| 33 | MF | (Serbia) SRB | Srđan Mijailović | 27 | 1 | 17+3 | 1 | 1 | 0 | 6 | 0 |
| 37 | MF | (Serbia) SRB | Vladimir Lučić | 30 | 2 | 13+10 | 1 | 1 | 1 | 1+5 | 0 |
| 40 | MF | (Serbia) SRB | Jovan Mituljikić | 0 | 0 | 0 | 0 | 0 | 0 | 0 | 0 |
| 41 | MF | (Serbia) SRB | Nikola Knežević | 5 | 2 | 1+2 | 0 | 2 | 2 | 0 | 0 |
| 44 | MF | (Serbia) SRB | Veljko Vukojević | 1 | 0 | 0 | 0 | 1 | 0 | 0 | 0 |
| 45 | MF | (Serbia) SRB | Nikola Mituljikić | 0 | 0 | 0 | 0 | 0 | 0 | 0 | 0 |
| 55 | MF | (Serbia) SRB | Andrija Maksimović | 1 | 0 | 0 | 0 | 0+1 | 0 | 0 | 0 |
| 66 | MF | (South Korea) KOR | Hwang In-beom | 23 | 3 | 13+4 | 2 | 0 | 0 | 6 | 1 |
Forwards
| 9 | FW | (Senegal) SEN | Cherif Ndiaye | 27 | 7 | 13+6 | 4 | 2 | 2 | 5+1 | 1 |
| 14 | FW | (Nigeria) NGA | Peter Olayinka | 30 | 5 | 19+5 | 5 | 1 | 0 | 2+3 | 0 |
| 17 | FW | (Ivory Coast) CIV | Jean-Philippe Krasso | 24 | 8 | 11+8 | 7 | 1 | 1 | 1+3 | 0 |
| 31 | FW | (Serbia) SRB | Uroš Sremčević | 2 | 0 | 1+1 | 0 | 0 | 0 | 0 | 0 |
Players transferred out during the season
| 16 | DF | (Georgia (country)) GEO | Irakli Azarovi | 1 | 0 | 0+1 | 0 | 0 | 0 | 0 | 0 |
| 22 | FW | (Serbia) SRB | Jovan Mijatović | 19 | 9 | 5+9 | 8 | 1 | 1 | 0+4 | 0 |
| 20 | MF | (Zambia) ZAM | Kings Kangwa | 11 | 0 | 8+2 | 0 | 0 | 0 | 0+1 | 0 |
| 70 | MF | (Serbia) SRB | Uroš Kabić | 6 | 0 | 0+3 | 0 | 1+1 | 0 | 0+1 | 0 |
| 80 | MF | (Serbia) SRB | Stefan Mitrović | 13 | 1 | 9 | 1 | 0+1 | 0 | 3 | 0 |

Last updated: 13 March 2024
Source: Competitions

=== Goalscorers ===
Includes all competitive matches. The list is sorted by shirt number when total goals are equal.

As of 25 May 2024

| Rank | Pos | No. | Player | League | Cup | Champions League | Total |
|---|---|---|---|---|---|---|---|
| 1 | FW | 9 | (Senegal) Cherif Ndiaye | 11 | 3 | 1 | 15 |
| 2 | MF | 10 | (Serbia) Aleksandar Katai | 9 | 2 | 1 | 12 |
| 2 | FW | 14 | (Nigeria) Peter Olayinka | 11 | 1 | 0 | 12 |
| 3 | MF | 30 | (Ghana) Osman Bukari | 7 | 1 | 2 | 10 |
| 4 | MF | 8 | (Gabon) Guélor Kanga | 9 | 0 | 0 | 9 |
| 4 | FW | 17 | (Ivory Coast) Jean-Philippe Krasso | 8 | 1 | 0 | 9 |
| 4 | FW | 22 | (Serbia) Jovan Mijatović | 8 | 1 | 0 | 9 |
| 7 | MF | 4 | (Montenegro) Mirko Ivanić | 5 | 1 | 0 | 6 |
| 7 | MF | 66 | (South Korea) Hwang In-beom | 5 | 0 | 1 | 6 |
| 9 | DF | 15 | (Austria) Aleksandar Dragović | 3 | 0 | 0 | 3 |
| 9 | MF | 41 | (Serbia) Nikola Knežević | 1 | 2 | 0 | 3 |
| 9 | DF | 23 | (Serbia) Milan Rodić | 3 | 0 | 0 | 3 |
| 9 | MF | 7 | (Serbia) Jovan Šljivić | 1 | 2 | 0 | 3 |
| 13 | MF | 37 | (Serbia) Vladimir Lučić | 1 | 1 | 0 | 2 |
| 13 | DF | 5 | (Serbia) Uroš Spajić | 2 | 0 | 0 | 2 |
| 13 | MF | 6 | (New Zealand) Marko Stamenić | 1 | 0 | 1 | 2 |
| 13 | MF | 33 | (Serbia) Srđan Mijailović | 2 | 0 | 0 | 2 |
| 13 | FW | 31 | (Serbia) Uroš Sremčević | 2 | 0 | 0 | 2 |
| 18 | DF | 24 | (Burkina Faso) Nasser Djiga | 1 | 0 | 0 | 1 |
| 18 | MF | 80 | (Serbia) Stefan Mitrović | 1 | 0 | 0 | 1 |
| Own goals | | | | 4 | 1 | 1 | 6 |
| TOTALS | | | | 94 | 18 | 7 | 119 |

=== Clean sheets ===
Includes all competitive matches. The list is sorted by shirt number when total clean sheets are equal.

As of 14 April 2024

| Rank | No. | Player | League | Cup | Champions League | Total |
|---|---|---|---|---|---|---|
| 1 | 18 | (Israel) Omri Glazer | 14 | 2 | 0 | 16 |
| 2 | 1 | (Serbia) Zoran Popović | 0 | 1 | 0 | 1 |
| TOTALS | | | 14 | 3 | 0 | 17 |

=== Disciplinary record ===
As of 13 March 2024

| Rank | No. | Pos | Player | League | | | Cup | | | Champions League | | | Total | | |
| Rank | No. | Pos | Player | Booked | (yellow card) (yellow-red card) | Sent off (straight red) | Booked | (yellow card) (yellow-red card) | Sent off (straight red) | Booked | (yellow card) (yellow-red card) | Sent off (straight red) | Booked | (yellow card) (yellow-red card) | Sent off (straight red) |
|---|---|---|---|---|---|---|---|---|---|---|---|---|---|---|---|
| 1 | 33 | MF | (Serbia) Srđan Mijailović | 3 | 0 | 0 | 0 | 0 | 0 | 3 | 0 | 0 | 6 | 0 | 0 |
| 2 | 4 | MF | (Montenegro) Mirko Ivanić | 2 | 0 | 0 | 0 | 0 | 0 | 2 | 0 | 0 | 4 | 0 | 0 |
| 2 | 6 | MF | (New Zealand) Marko Stamenić | 2 | 0 | 0 | 0 | 0 | 0 | 2 | 0 | 0 | 4 | 0 | 0 |
| 2 | 15 | DF | (Austria) Aleksandar Dragović | 2 | 0 | 0 | 1 | 0 | 0 | 1 | 0 | 0 | 4 | 0 | 0 |
| 2 | 23 | DF | (Serbia) Milan Rodić | 2 | 0 | 0 | 0 | 0 | 0 | 2 | 0 | 0 | 4 | 0 | 0 |
| 2 | 24 | DF | (Burkina Faso) Nasser Djiga | 2 | 0 | 0 | 0 | 0 | 0 | 2 | 0 | 0 | 4 | 0 | 0 |
| 2 | 30 | MF | (Ghana) Osman Bukari | 3 | 0 | 0 | 0 | 0 | 0 | 1 | 0 | 0 | 4 | 0 | 0 |
| 8 | 8 | MF | (Gabon) Guélor Kanga | 3 | 0 | 0 | 0 | 0 | 0 | 0 | 0 | 0 | 3 | 0 | 0 |
| 8 | 9 | FW | (Senegal) Cherif Ndiaye | 2 | 0 | 0 | 0 | 0 | 0 | 1 | 0 | 0 | 3 | 0 | 0 |
| 8 | 66 | MF | (South Korea) Hwang In-beom | 1 | 0 | 0 | 0 | 0 | 0 | 2 | 0 | 0 | 3 | 0 | 0 |
| 11 | 5 | DF | (Serbia) Uroš Spajić | 1 | 0 | 0 | 0 | 0 | 0 | 1 | 0 | 0 | 2 | 0 | 0 |
| 11 | 14 | FW | (Nigeria) Peter Olayinka | 1 | 0 | 0 | 0 | 0 | 0 | 1 | 0 | 0 | 2 | 0 | 0 |
| 11 | 41 | MF | (Serbia) Nikola Knežević | 0 | 0 | 0 | 2 | 0 | 0 | 0 | 0 | 0 | 2 | 0 | 0 |
| 14 | 1 | GK | (Serbia) Zoran Popović | 1 | 0 | 0 | 0 | 0 | 0 | 0 | 0 | 0 | 1 | 0 | 0 |
| 14 | 2 | DF | (Serbia) Kosta Nedeljković | 1 | 0 | 0 | 0 | 0 | 0 | 0 | 0 | 0 | 1 | 0 | 0 |
| 14 | 7 | MF | (Serbia) Jovan Šljivić | 1 | 0 | 0 | 0 | 0 | 0 | 0 | 0 | 0 | 1 | 0 | 0 |
| 14 | 10 | MF | (Serbia) Aleksandar Katai | 1 | 0 | 0 | 0 | 0 | 0 | 0 | 0 | 0 | 1 | 0 | 0 |
| 14 | 17 | FW | (Ivory Coast) Jean-Philippe Krasso | 0 | 0 | 0 | 0 | 0 | 0 | 1 | 0 | 0 | 1 | 0 | 0 |
| 14 | 18 | GK | (Israel) Omri Glazer | 1 | 0 | 0 | 0 | 0 | 0 | 0 | 0 | 0 | 1 | 0 | 0 |
| 14 | 19 | DF | (Serbia) Nemanja Milunović | 1 | 0 | 0 | 0 | 0 | 0 | 0 | 0 | 0 | 1 | 0 | 0 |
| 14 | 22 | FW | (Serbia) Jovan Mijatović | 1 | 0 | 0 | 0 | 0 | 0 | 0 | 0 | 0 | 1 | 0 | 0 |
| 14 | 37 | MF | (Serbia) Vladimir Lučić | 0 | 0 | 0 | 0 | 0 | 0 | 1 | 0 | 0 | 1 | 0 | 0 |
| 14 | 70 | MF | (Serbia) Uroš Kabić | 1 | 0 | 0 | 0 | 0 | 0 | 0 | 0 | 0 | 1 | 0 | 0 |
| 14 | 76 | DF | (Serbia) Lazar Nikolić | 1 | 0 | 0 | 0 | 0 | 0 | 0 | 0 | 0 | 1 | 0 | 0 |
| TOTALS | | | | 33 | 0 | 0 | 3 | 0 | 0 | 20 | 0 | 0 | 55 | 0 | 0 |

== Transfers ==
=== In ===
| # | Pos. | Player | Transferred from | Date | Fee |
Summer
| 14 | FW | (Nigeria) Peter Olayinka | (Czech Republic) Slavia Prague | 9 January 2023 | Free |
| 6 | MF | (New Zealand) Marko Stamenić | (Denmark) Copenhagen | 6 February 2023 | Free |
| – | FW | (Nigeria) Shedrack Charles | (Serbia) IMT | 1 June 2023 | Free |
| 17 | FW | (Ivory Coast) Jean-Philippe Krasso | (France) Saint-Étienne | 20 June 2023 | Free |
| 21 | MF | (Ghana) Edmund Addo | (Serbia) Spartak Subotica | 21 June 2023 | Undisclosed (~ €400,000) |
| 18 | GK | (Israel) Omri Glazer | (Israel) Hapoel Be'er Sheva | 22 June 2023 | Undisclosed (~ €1,200,000) |
| 70 | MF | (Serbia) Uroš Kabić | (Serbia) Vojvodina | 23 July 2023 | Undisclosed (~ €800,000) |
| 3 | DF | (Australia) Miloš Degenek | (United States) Columbus Crew | 24 July 2023 | Undisclosed (~ €500,000) |
| 79 | DF | (Serbia) Andrej Đurić | (Slovenia) Domžale | 23 August 2023 | Undisclosed |
| 24 | DF | (Burkina Faso) Nasser Djiga | (Switzerland) Basel | 4 September 2023 | Loan |
| 66 | MF | (South Korea) Hwang In-beom | (Greece) Olympiacos | 14 September 2023 | Undisclosed (~ €5,500,000) |
| 9 | FW | (Senegal) Cherif Ndiaye | (Turkey) Adana Demirspor | 15 September 2023 | Undisclosed (~ €4,000,000) |
Winter
| 2 | DF | (Serbia) Kosta Nedeljković | (England) Aston Villa | 22 January 2024 | Loan |
| 31 | FW | (Serbia) Uroš Sremčević | (Serbia) Mladost Lučani | 2 February 2024 | Undisclosed (~ €2,000,000) |
| 77 | GK | (Serbia) Ivan Guteša | (Serbia) Grafičar Beograd | 6 February 2024 | Free |

=== Out ===
| # | Pos. | Player | Transferred to | Date | Fee |
Summer
| 7 | MF | (Serbia) Nenad Krstičić | – | 1 June 2023 | Retired |
| 17 | MF | (Serbia) Nemanja Motika | (Slovenia) Olimpija Ljubljana | 12 June 2023 | Free (Note: Was loaned to Austria Lustenau in the 2022–23 season.) |
| 36 | DF | (Serbia) Aleksandar Lukić | (Serbia) Voždovac | 12 June 2023 | Free (Note: Was loaned to IMT in the 2022–23 season.) |
| 6 | DF | (Serbia) Radovan Pankov | (Poland) Legia Warsaw | 13 June 2023 | Free (Note: Was loaned to Čukarički in the 2022–23 season.) |
| 22 | MF | (Serbia) Veljko Nikolić | (Cyprus) Aris Limassol | 16 June 2023 | Undisclosed |
| 72 | FW | (Serbia) Aleksandar Pešić | (Hungary) Ferencvárosi | 16 June 2023 | Undisclosed (~ €1,200,000) |
| 21 | MF | (Serbia) Petar Stanić | (Serbia) TSC | 27 June 2023 | €200,000 (Note: Was loaned to Spartak in the 2022–23 season.) |
| 17 | FW | (Montenegro) Marko Rakonjac | (Russia) Lokomotiv Moscow | 30 June 2023 | Loan return |
| 35 | MF | (Ivory Coast) Sékou Sanogo | (Switzerland) Schaffhausen | 1 July 2023 | Free (Note: Was loaned to Paris FC in the 2022–23 season.) |
| 49 | MF | (Montenegro) Andrija Radulović | (Serbia) Vojvodina | 7 July 2023 | Free (Note: Was loaned to Mladost GAT and Radnik in the 2022–23 season.) |
| 38 | MF | (Serbia) Nikola Stanković | (Serbia) Čukarički | 8 July 2023 | Free (Note: Was loaned to Napredak in the 2022–23 season.) |
| 25 | DF | (Serbia) Strahinja Eraković | (Russia) Zenit | 23 July 2023 | Undisclosed (~ €8,000,000) |
| 93 | FW | (Serbia) Ilija Babić | (Serbia) Spartak | 20 August 2023 | Free (Note: Was loaned to Mladost GAT and Radnik in the 2022–23 season and to Voždovac at the start of 2023–24 season.) |
| 55 | MF | (Serbia) Slavoljub Srnić | (Cyprus) AEL Limassol | 22 August 2023 | Free |
| 16 | DF | (Georgia (country)) Irakli Azarovi | (Ukraine) Shakhtar Donetsk | 22 August 2023 | Undisclosed (~ €3,000,000) |
| 77 | DF | (Serbia) Marko Gobeljić | (Greece) Kifisia | 12 September 2023 | Free |
Winter
| 13 | DF | (Argentina) Alex Vigo | (Argentina) River Plate | 1 January 2024 | Loan return |
| 11 | MF | (Italy) Filippo Falco | Unatached | 12 January 2024 | Free |
| 27 | MF | (Serbia) Nikola Vasiljević | (Serbia) Radnički Niš | 14 January 2024 | Free |
| 2 | DF | (Serbia) Kosta Nedeljković | (England) Aston Villa | 22 January 2024 | Undisclosed (~ €9,000,000) |
| – | FW | (Serbia) Mateja Bubanj | (Serbia) Voždovac | 26 January 2024 | Free (Note: Was playing for youth squad in the first half of the 2023–24 season.) |
| 80 | MF | (Serbia) Stefan Mitrović | (Italy) Hellas Verona | 1 February 2024 | Undisclosed (~ €1,300,000) |
| 22 | FW | (Serbia) Jovan Mijatović | (United States) New York City FC | 19 February 2024 | Undisclosed (~ €8,000,000) |

=== Loan returns and promotions ===
| # | Position | Player | Returned from | Date |
Summer
| 2 | DF | (Serbia) Kosta Nedeljković | (Serbia) Grafičar | 19 June 2023 |
| 7 | MF | (Serbia) Jovan Šljivić | (Serbia) Grafičar | 19 June 2023 |
| 37 | MF | (Serbia) Vladimir Lučić | (Serbia) Čukarički | 19 June 2023 |
| 1 | GK | (Serbia) Zoran Popović | (Serbia) Čukarički | 1 July 2023 |
| 41 | MF | (Serbia) Nikola Knežević | (Serbia) Napredak | 1 July 2023 |
Winter
| 29 | DF | (Serbia) Viktor Radojević | (Serbia) Grafičar | 10 January 2024 |
| 70 | DF | (Serbia) Ognjen Mimović | Promoted from youth (Note: Was loaned to OFK Beograd in the first half of 2023–24 season.) | 15 January 2024 |

=== Loan out ===
| # | Position | Player | Loaned to | Date |
Summer
| – | DF | (Serbia) Uroš Lazić | (Serbia) Novi Pazar | 22 June 2023 (Note: Was loaned to Radnik in the 2022–23 season.) |
| 93 | FW | (Serbia) Ilija Babić | (Serbia) Voždovac | 28 June 2023 (Note: Was loaned to Mladost GAT in the 2022–23 season.) |
| 82 | GK | (Canada) Milan Borjan | (Slovakia) Slovan Bratislava | 4 July 2023 |
| 40 | MF | (Serbia) Jovan Mituljikić | (Serbia) Radnički 1923 | 6 July 2023 (Note: Was loaned to Grafičar and Mladost GAT in the 2022–23 season.) |
| 39 | FW | (Bosnia and Herzegovina) Aleksandar Kahvić | (Serbia) OFK Beograd | 15 July 2023 (Note: Was loaned to Maccabi Haifa in the 2022–23 season.) |
| 51 | GK | (Serbia) Miloš Gordić | (Serbia) IMT | 22 July 2023 (Note: Was loaned to AEK Larnaca in the 2022–23 season.) |
| – | DF | (Serbia) Nikola Glišić | (Serbia) IMT | 22 July 2023 (Note: Loan extension.) |
| – | FW | (Nigeria) Shedrack Charles | (Serbia) IMT | 22 July 2023 |
| 29 | MF | (Russia) Yegor Prutsev | (Slovenia) Celje | 19 August 2023 |
| 44 | DF | (Serbia) Stefan Leković | (Spain) Villarreal B | 1 September 2023 |
| – | DF | (Serbia) Andrej Đurić | (Slovakia) Spartak Trnava | 5 September 2023 |
Winter
| 39 | FW | (Bosnia and Herzegovina) Aleksandar Kahvić | (Serbia) Železničar | 24 January 2024 (Note: Was loaned to OFK Beograd in the first half of 2023–24 season.) |
| 21 | MF | (Ghana) Edmund Addo | (Serbia) Radnički Niš | 31 January 2024 |
| 20 | MF | (Zambia) Kings Kangwa | (Belgium) Kortrijk | 1 February 2024 |
| 70 | MF | (Serbia) Uroš Kabić | (Italy) Torino | 1 February 2024 |
| – | DF | (Serbia) Uroš Lazić | (Czech Republic) České Budějovice | 22 February 2024 (Note: Was loaned to Novi Pazar in the first half of 2023–24 season.) |

== See also ==
- 2023–24 KK Crvena zvezda season
