= Jovan Šljivić =

Serbian footballer (born 2005)

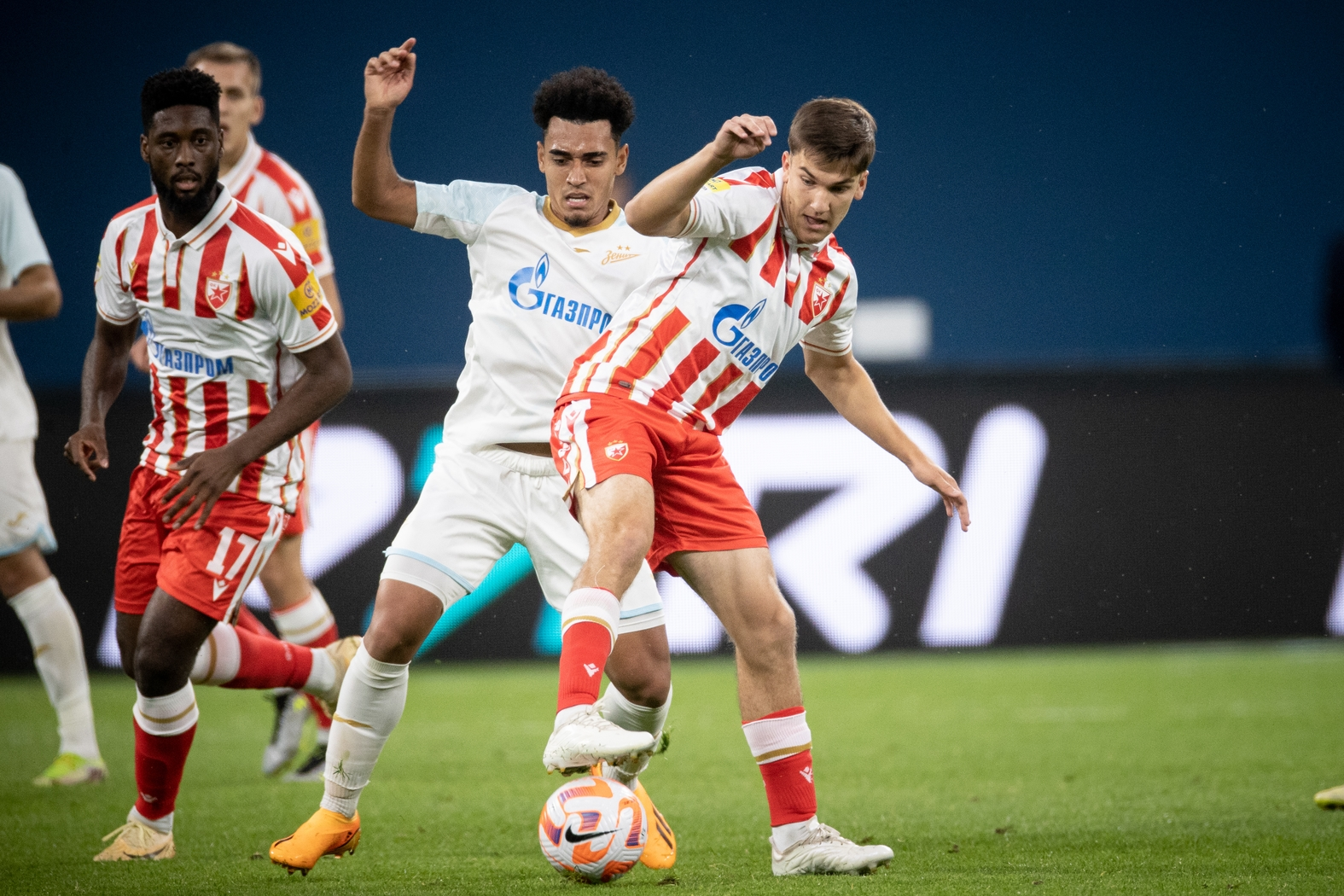

Personal information
- Full name: Jovan Šljivić
- Date of birth: 14 October 2005 (age 21)
- Place of birth: Kruševac, Serbia and Montenegro
- Height: 1.78 m (5 ft 10 in)
- Position: Attacking midfielder

Team information
- Current team: OFK Beograd (on loan from Red Star Belgrade)
- Number: 20

Youth career
- 2021–2023: Red Star Belgrade

Senior career*
Years	Team	Apps	(Gls)
2022–	Red Star Belgrade	36	(3)
2022–2023	→ Grafičar Beograd (dual)	21	(5)
2025–	→ OFK Beograd (loan)	21	(1)

International career^{‡}
2019	Serbia U15	2	(0)
2021–2022	Serbia U17	11	(4)
2022–	Serbia U19	14	(2)
2024–	Serbia U21	9	(0)
- * Club domestic league appearances and goals as of 12 June 2026 ‡ National team caps and goals as of 8 September 2025

Jovan Šljivić (Serbian Cyrillic: Јован Шљивић, born 14 October 2005) is a Serbian professional footballer who plays as an attacking midfielder for Serbian SuperLiga club OFK Beograd on loan from Red Star Belgrade.

An offshoot of Red Star Belgrade football academy and a modern type of playmaker, Šljivić completed the Red Star Belgrade Youth School. At 16 years old, he played in the Grafičar Beograd jersey on dual registration, showing potential to eventually wear the Red Star Belgrade jersey.

Before the start of the 2023–24 Serbian SuperLiga season, Šljivić was included in the Red Star Belgrade main squad, receiving the number 7 shirt. On 30 July 2023, he made his debut for the Red Star Belgrade main squad in a Serbian SuperLiga match against Vojvodina.

Šljivić was included in The Guardian's "Next Generation" list for 2022.

== Career statistics ==
As of match played 24 May 2025

Club	Season	League			Serbian Cup		Europe		Total	
Club	Season	Division	Apps	Goals	Apps	Goals	Apps	Goals	Apps	Goals
Red Star Belgrade	2023–24	Serbian SuperLiga	18	1	4	2	0	0	22	3
Red Star Belgrade	2024–25	Serbian SuperLiga	15	2	2	0	0	0	17	2
Red Star Belgrade	2025–26	Serbian SuperLiga	0	0	0	0	0	0	0	0
Red Star Belgrade	Total		33	3	6	2	0	0	34	5
Grafičar Beograd (loan)	2022–23	Serbian First League	21	5	0	0	–		21	5
Career total			54	8	6	2	0	0	60	11

== Honours ==
Red Star Belgrade

- Serbian SuperLiga: 2024–25
- Serbian Cup: 2024–25
