= Nikola Knežević =

Serbian footballer (born 2003)

- Knežević playing for Red Star Belgrade in 2024

Personal information
- Full name: Nikola Knežević
- Date of birth: 10 March 2003 (age 23)
- Place of birth: Zemun, Serbia and Montenegro
- Height: 1.80 m (5 ft 11 in)
- Position: Attacking midfielder

Team information
- Current team: Wieczysta Kraków
- Number: 11

Youth career
- –2021: Red Star Belgrade

Senior career*
| Years | Team | Apps | (Gls) |
| 2021–2024 | Red Star Belgrade | 7 | (1) |
| 2021–2022 | → Grafičar (loan) | 49 | (10) |
| 2023 | → Napredak Kruševac (loan) | 15 | (0) |
| 2023–2024 | → OFK Beograd (dual) | 24 | (4) |
| 2024–2026 | OFK Beograd | 46 | (7) |
| 2026– | Wieczysta Kraków | 10 | (0) |
| 2026– | Wieczysta Kraków II | 1 | (0) |

International career
| 2022 | Serbia U19 | 7 | (0) |
| 2022–2023 | Serbia U21 | 4 | (0) |
- * Club domestic league appearances and goals as of 21:08, 31 May 2026 (UTC)

Nikola Knežević (Serbian Cyrillic: Никола Kнежевић; born 10 March 2003) is a Serbian professional footballer who plays as an attacking midfielder for Polish club Wieczysta Kraków.

== Club career ==
Knežević came through the youth academy of Red Star Belgrade and played for its youth team until 2021. That same summer, he was loaned to Grafičar along with several other peers. In a season-and-a-half at the club, he made a total of 50 official appearances and scored 10 goals with 15 assists.

In early 2023, he was loaned to Napredak Kruševac, where he made his debut in the Serbian SuperLiga.

Upon returning from the loan, the media wrote about the possibility of him permanently leaving his parent club. However, Knežević signed a new four-year contract at the end of July 2023 and was given the number 41 jersey. The following month, he was transferred to OFK Beograd, in accordance with the league rules. (Note: According to the Regulations on Cooperation between Football Clubs, it implies the right of a young football player to play for a contracted club in the Serbian First League in parallel with the parent club, a member of the Serbian SuperLiga. A young player is considered a possible member of the Serbia U21 national team or a foreign football player of that age. The maximum number of such players from the parent club is limited to 10, up to 5 in the same contracted club. In another club, playing for the first team is allowed, but not for younger categories. As colloquially called dual registration, previously existing, according to these Regulations, football players are registered only for the parent club.) He made his debut for Red Star Belgrade on 18 October 2023, in the round of 16 of the Serbian Cup, when he scored in a victory away to Trayal. He also scored in the next round of that competition, against Radnički Niš. A few days later, coach Barak Bakhar gave him the opportunity to play for the club in the Serbian SuperLiga, when he played the second half against Mladost Lučani. He then played the first half of the next round match, against Spartak Subotica in Subotica, which he started as one of three bonus players alongside Kosta Nedeljković and Jovan Mijatović. (Note: A mandatory "bonus player" is defined in the competition regulations for the 2023/24 season as a citizen of the Republic of Serbia born on or after 1 January 2002.) He sat on the bench in the 171st eternal derby. Knežević continued to play for OFK Beograd in the second half of the season, with the possibility of being recalled to the first team of his parent club. In a friendly match against Zenit Saint Petersburg in March 2024, Knežević scored the only goal for Red Star Belgrade in a narrow victory at the Rajko Mitić Stadium. He scored his first goal in the Serbian SuperLiga in the penultimate round of the competition, against his former club Napredak Kruševac in Kruševac. With four goals in 24 appearances, he stood out with his assists during the season, contributing to winning the Serbian First League and OFK Beograd's promotion to the highest level of competition in Serbia. During that time, he made 10 appearances for Red Star, thus completing the figure of 100 official matches in his professional career. With three goals and two assists, he contributed to winning the double crown.

== International career ==
Knežević was called up to the Serbia U16 national team's squad in February 2019. He made his debut for the Serbia U19 team in March 2022 under coach Aleksandar Jović. He later qualified for the 2022 UEFA European Championship with the team and participated in the final tournament. The head coach of the Serbia U21 team, Goran Stevanović, invited Knežević to play a friendly match against Bulgaria U21 in September 2022. He made his debut two months later, in a friendly match against Cyprus U21.

== Honours ==
Red Star Belgrade

- Serbian SuperLiga: 2023–24
- Serbian Cup: 2023–24

Wieczysta Kraków II

- IV liga Lesser Poland: 2025–26

== Literature ==
- Фудбал, број 11 (PDF). Фудбалски савез Србије. 2023. COBISS 107563532
- Фудбал, број 14 (PDF). Фудбалски савез Србије. 2023.
