= Ninac Vukosalić =

Serbian writer

Ninac (Cyrillic: Нинац; fl. 1450–59) was a figure who served in the court of the Albanian lord Skanderbeg between 1450-59. He was involved in writing and delivering correspondence in Slavic to the Republic of Ragusa. He collaborated with Skanderbeg's diplomat in Ragusa Pal Gazulli and at least in one occasion they were involved in the transfer of funds from Ragusa to Skanderbeg.

Political and commercial correspondence between different courts in the medieval era was mediated by scribes, each of whom was responsible for communication in one specific language. Ninac or Ninec appears in the court of Skanderbeg around 1450. He may not have been originally a scribe but someone who was considered trustworthy as in his writing he changed the spelling of his name several times and didn't call himself a logotet as was customary. He wrote his surname as Vlkosalik and Vukosalik (Вꙋкосалик); the modern spelling is Vukosalić.

Ninac was responsible for the correspondence of Skanderbeg with the Republic of Ragusa from 1450 to 1459. In the first letter, he calls himself a dijak (scribe) which he continues to use in later correspondence but later also adopts the commonly recognized title of chancelier in Ragusa. He served as Skanderbeg's scribe for at least nine years. He wrote in Early Cyrillic and in his writing many features of the Zeta dialect of Shtokavian as well as other southern dialects can be discerned. He was probably a native speaker of these dialects. As such Jovanović (1990) proposes that he was a Serb. In his writing, certain terms which may seem odd in Serbo-Croatian, may be the result of root-for-root translation from Albanian. The letters written by Ninac were published in the late 19th century by Franz Miklosich.

== Annotations ==
1. His full name was spelt in Old Slavic in 1459 as "Ниньц Вукосаликю", rendered as Ninac Vukosalić (Нинац Вукосалић) or Ninac Vukosaljić (Нинац Вукосаљић). Another rendering from another letter is "Нинац Влакосалик". The surname is derived from Vukosavljević through reduction.

== Sources ==
- Ndreca, Arben (2019). "A handful of documents about Gjon and Gjergj Castriot in Old Slavic (Part two) [Disa dokumente rreth Gjon dhe Gjergj Kastriotit në sllavishten e vjetër (Pjesa II)]". Shejzat - Pleiades. 1–2.
- Ajeti, Idriz (1969). Simpoziumi per Skenderbeun. Instituti Albanologjik.
- Jovanović, Gordana (1990). "Старосрпски језик у два писма Ђурђа Кастриота Дубровчанима". Становништво словенског поријекла у Албанији. Cetinje: Rastko.
- Đorđić, Petar (1987). Istorija srpske ćirilice. Zavod za udžbenike i nastavna sredstva. ISBN 9788617003386.
- Slijepčević, Đoko M. (1983). Srpsko-arbanaški odnosi kroz vekove sa posebnim osvrtom na novije vreme. Đ. Slijepčević.
