= Jovan Mijatović =

Serbian footballer (born 2005)

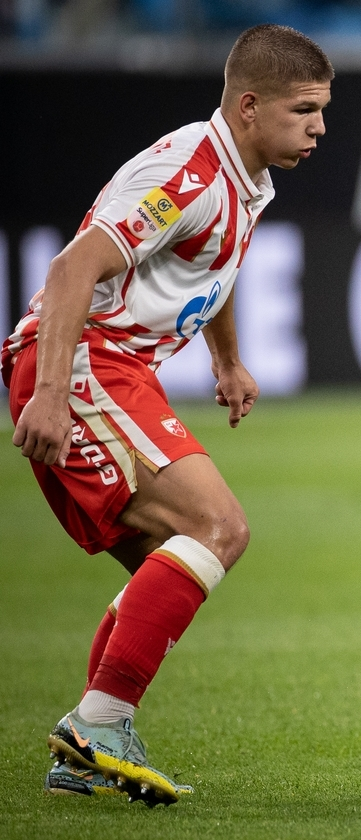
- Mijatović playing for Red Star Belgrade in 2023

Personal information
- Date of birth: 11 July 2005 (age 21)
- Place of birth: Belgrade, Serbia and Montenegro
- Height: 1.79 m (5 ft 10 in)
- Position: Forward

Team information
- Current team: Eintracht Braunschweig (on loan from New York City FC)
- Number: 11

Youth career
- Red Star Belgrade

Senior career*
Years	Team	Apps	(Gls)
2022–2024	Red Star Belgrade	26	(9)
2022–2023	→ Grafičar Beograd (loan)	13	(5)
2024–	New York City FC	11	(0)
2024–	New York City FC II	0	(0)
2025–2026	→ OH Leuven (loan)	21	(1)
2026–	→ Eintracht Braunschweig (loan)	14	(1)

International career^{‡}
2022	Serbia U17	8	(1)
2022–2024	Serbia U19	19	(5)
2024–	Serbia U21	10	(4)
- * Club domestic league appearances and goals as of 18 May 2026 ‡ National team caps and goals as of 18 November 2025

Jovan Mijatović (Serbian Cyrillic: Јован Мијатовић; born 11 July 2005) is a Serbian professional footballer who plays as a forward for 2. Bundesliga club Eintracht Braunschweig, on loan from Major League Soccer (MLS) club New York City FC.

== Club career ==
Mijatović went through the junior selections of Red Star Belgrade. At the beginning of the spring of 2021, he suffered a serious knee injury, which caused him to be absent from the field in the following period. With the cadet team, he participated in winning the title for the 2021/22 season, while occasionally playing for the youth team. At the beginning of the competition 2022/23. Mijatović played for Grafičar, where he scored five goals in eight games in the Serbian First League. At the end of the summer transfer window of the same year, he was returned to his parent club and joined the first team. He took the number 9 jersey previously worn by Milan Pavkov.

On 31 January 2025, Mijatović joined OH Leuven in Belgium on loan until the end of the 2024–25 season. He made his debut on 16 February 2025 and scored the winning goal against FCV Dender.

On 29 January 2026, Mijatović moved on a new loan to Eintracht Braunschweig in German 2. Bundesliga, initially until the end of the 2025–26 season, Eintracht held the option to buy or extend the loan at the end of the initial term. As he played the number of games specified in the loan contract during the 2025–26 season, the loan was automatically extended to the end of 2026.

== International career ==
=== Youth ===
In 2019, Mijatović played for the Serbian under-15 national team. He scored a goal at the opening of the Trofej Crna Gora tournament in Podgorica, against the corresponding team of Slovenia. He also made his debut for the under-16 team at a friendly match with his peers from Romania in March 2021. Soon after that, he suffered an injury that kept him off the field for a long time .

He joined the Serbia national under-17 football team a year later, debuting in a friendly match against Bosnia and Herzegovina. He enjoyed a long run in the 2022 UEFA European Under-17 Championship, where Serbia reached the semi-finals under the leadership of Radovan Krivokapić, scoring the lead goal in their semi-final against the Netherlands, only to eventually lose on penalties.

The selector of the Serbia national under-19 football team, Jovan Damjanović, sent an invitation to Mijatović for the "Stevan Vilotić Ćele" Memorial Tournament in September 2022.

== Career statistics ==
As of 29 January 2026

Appearances and goals by club, season and competition
Club	Season	League			National cup		Continental		Other		Total	
Club	Season	Division	Apps	Goals	Apps	Goals	Apps	Goals	Apps	Goals	Apps	Goals
Red Star Belgrade	2022–23	Serbian SuperLiga	12	1	3	0	2 (Note: Appearances in UEFA Europa League)	0	0	0	17	1
Red Star Belgrade	2023–24	Serbian SuperLiga	14	8	1	0	4 (Note: Appearances in UEFA Champions League)	0	0	0	19	8
Red Star Belgrade	Total		26	9	4	0	6	0	0	0	36	9
Grafičar Beograd (loan)	2022–23	Serbian First League	8	5	—		—		—		8	5
Grafičar Beograd (loan)	2023–24	Serbian First League	5	0	—		—		—		5	0
Grafičar Beograd (loan)	Total		13	5	—		—		—		13	5
New York City	2024	Major League Soccer	11	0	0	0	—		—		11	0
New York City II	2024	MLS Next Pro	0	0	2	0	—		—		2	0
OH Leuven (loan)	2024–25	Belgian Pro League	5	1	0	0	—		2 (Note: Appearances in Jupiler Pro League Europe Playoffs)	0	7	1
OH Leuven (loan)	2025–26	Belgian Pro League	14	0	2	0	—		—		16	0
OH Leuven (loan)	Total		19	1	2	0	0	0	2	0	23	1
Eintracht Braunschweig (loan)	2025–26	2. Bundesliga	0	0	0	0	—		—		0	0
Career total			69	15	8	0	6	0	2	0	85	15

== Honours ==
Red Star Belgrade

- Serbian SuperLiga: 2022–23
- Serbian Cup: 2022–23

Individual

- Serbian SuperLiga Player of the Week: 2023–24 (Round 19)
