= Trifun =

Trifun (Serbian: Трифун) is a Serbian male given name, a variant of the Greek name Tryphon.

Notable people with this name include:

- Trifun Kostovski (born 1946), Macedonian politician, businessman and singer
- Trifun Mihailović (born 1947), Serbian footballer
- Trifun Živanović (born 1975), American-born Serbian figure skater

== See also ==
- Trifunović
