= Uroš Sremčević =

Serbian footballer (born 2006)

Personal information
- Full name: Uroš Sremčević
- Date of birth: 24 April 2006 (age 20)
- Place of birth: Kragujevac, Serbia and Montenegro
- Height: 1.86 m (6 ft 1 in)
- Position: Forward

Team information
- Current team: Radnički 1923 (on loan from Red Star Belgrade)
- Number: 9

Youth career
- Apolon 4
- 2018–2021: Radnički 1923
- 2021–2023: Mladost Lučani

Senior career*
Years	Team	Apps	(Gls)
2022–2024	Mladost Lučani	27	(4)
2024–	Red Star Belgrade	8	(2)
2024–2025	→ Grafičar Beograd (dual)	19	(3)
2025	→ Mladost Lučani (loan)	18	(0)
2026	→ Napredak Kruševac (loan)	12	(1)
2026–	→ Radnički 1923 (loan)	9	(4)

International career^{‡}
2022–2023	Serbia U17	11	(6)
2023–	Serbia U19	14	(1)
- * Club domestic league appearances and goals as of 16 August 2026 ‡ National team caps and goals as of 19 November 2024

Uroš Sremčević (Serbian Cyrillic: Урош Сремчевић; born 24 April 2006) is a Serbian professional footballer who plays as a forward for Radnički 1923, on loan from Red Star Belgrade.

== Club career ==
=== Mladost Lučani ===
Sremčević arrived in the younger categories of Mladost Lučani from his native club Radnički 1923 and he first played for the cadets of the Mladost Lučani club. He made his debut in the last round of the 2021–22 season in the Serbian SuperLiga, replacing Lazar Selenić on the field in the second half of the match against Spartak Subotica. During the 2022–23 season, he made 10 appearances in the Serbian SuperLiga and one in the Serbian Cup, playing the first half in the defeat against Radnički Beograd. Throughout the season, he mostly played for the youth team, occasionally being part of the cadet team. He scored a total of 11 goals, including a hat-trick against the Partizan youth team. In June 2023, Sremčević signed a new three-year contract with the club.

Ahead of the 2023–24 Serbian SuperLiga, he was assigned the number 9 jersey and at the opening of the season he was one of the three bonus players (Note: Обавезан „бонус играч” је у пропозицијама такмичења за сезону 2023/24. дефинисан као држављанин Републике Србије рођен 1. 1. 2002. и касније.) in his team's lineup against Radnik Surdulica. He scored his first goal in his senior career in the next round, in a victory over Železničar Pančevo in Pančevo. He also scored for a narrow win over Javor Ivanjica in the 14th round, after an assist from Patrick Friday Eze. The same players were involved in the game-winning goal against IMT at Voždovac Stadium. Sremčević scored the only goal for Mladost Lučani in a 3:1 defeat against Red Star Belgrade.

=== Red Star Belgrade ===
On the second day of February 2024, Sremčević was presented as a new player of Red Star Belgrade. He signed a three-year contract and borrowed the number 31 jersey previously worn by El Fardou Ben. According to the media, the value of the compensation was estimated at two million euros, which is the most expensive transfer between two Serbian SuperLiga clubs until then. In the first official game of Red Star Belgrade after his arrival at the club, he came into the game instead of Cherif Ndiaye in the final match against Voždovac. In the next round, against the team of Novi Pazar, Sremčević started the game on the field as the only bonus player in Red Star Belgrade. In the penultimate round of the season, against Napredak Kruševac in Kruševac, Sremčević was a double scorer. Those were also his first goals in the red and white jersey. During the second part of the 2023–24 competition. he played a total of 9 official matches and won the "double crown" with Red Star Belgrade.

== International career ==
Sremčević has represented Serbia at youth international level.

== Career statistics ==
As of match played 25 May 2024

Club	Season	League			Serbian Cup		Europe		Total	
Club	Season	Division	Apps	Goals	Apps	Goals	Apps	Goals	Apps	Goals
Mladost Lučani	2021–22	Serbian SuperLiga	1	0	0	0	–		1	0
Mladost Lučani	2022–23	Serbian SuperLiga	10	0	1	0	–		11	0
Mladost Lučani	2023–24	Serbian SuperLiga	16	4	1	0	–		17	4
Mladost Lučani	Total		27	4	2	0	–		29	4
Red Star Belgrade	2023–24	Serbian SuperLiga	8	2	1	0	–		9	2
Career total			35	6	3	0	0	0	38	6
