= Nedeljković =

Nedeljković (Cyrillic script: Недељковић) is a Serbian patronymic surname derived from a masculine given name Nedeljko. It may refer to:

- Aleksandar Nedeljković (born 1982), footballer
- Alex Nedeljkovic (born 1996), American professional ice hockey player
- Bogoljub Nedeljković (1920–1986), politician
- Goran Nedeljković (born 1982), rower
- Ivan Nedeljković (born 1978), footballer
- Kosta Nedeljković (born 2005), footballer
- Milorad Nedeljković (1883–1961), politician
- Ozren Nedeljković (1903–1984), chess master
- Petar Nedeljković (1882–1955), general
- Saša Nedeljković (born 1967), footballer
- Silvija Nedeljković (born 1984), singer
- Srećko Nedeljković (1923–2011), chess master
- Verica Nedeljković (1929–2023), chess master
