= Nedeljko =

Nedeljko (Serbian: Недељко) is a Serbian masculine given name. It may refer to:

- Nedeljko Bajić Baja (born 1968), singer
- Nedeljko Bulatović (1938–2023), footballer and football manager
- Nedeljko Čabrinović (1895–1916), revolutionary
- Nedeljko Gvozdenović (1902–1988), painter
- Nedeljko Jovanović (born 1970), handball player
- Nedeljko Malić (born 1988), footballer
- Nedeljko Milosavljević (born 1960), footballer
- Nedeljko Vukoje (born 1943), footballer

== See also ==
- Nedeljković
