= Aleksandar Stanković (footballer, born 1998) =

Serbian football player

Personal information
- Date of birth: 17 February 1998 (age 28)
- Place of birth: Belgrade, FR Yugoslavia
- Height: 1.91 m (6 ft 3 in)
- Position: Goalkeeper

Team information
- Current team: Vršac
- Number: 12

Youth career
- –2016: Red Star Belgrade

Senior career*
Years	Team	Apps	(Gls)
2016–2021	Red Star Belgrade	0	(0)
2016–2018	→ Grafičar Beograd (loan)	47	(0)
2020	→ Napredak Kruševac (loan)	1	(0)
2020–2021	→ Grafičar Beograd (loan)	31	(0)
2021	Zrinjski	0	(0)
2021–2023	Grafičar Beograd	50	(0)
2023	→ OFK Beograd (loan)	0	(0)
2023–2024	Železničar Pančevo	2	(0)
2024–2026	Smederevo	41	(0)
2025	→ Železničar Pančevo (loan)	0	(0)
2026–	Vršac	5	(0)

International career
2018–2020	Serbia U21	2	(0)
- * Club domestic league appearances and goals as of 14 May 2026

Aleksandar Stanković (Serbian Cyrillic: Александар Станковић; born 17 February 1998) is a Serbian professional footballer who plays as a goalkeeper for Smederevo.
