= Kosta Nedeljković =

Serbian footballer (born 2005)

Kosta Nedeljković Kоста Недељковић
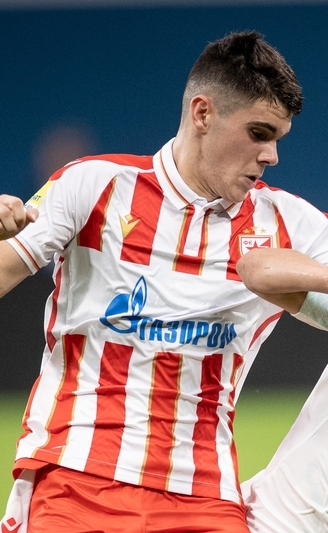
- Nedeljković playing for Red Star Belgrade in 2023

Personal information
- Full name: Kosta Nedeljković
- Date of birth: 16 December 2005 (age 20)
- Place of birth: Smederevo, Serbia and Montenegro
- Height: 1.84 m (6 ft 0 in)
- Position: Right-back

Team information
- Current team: Rangers (on loan from Aston Villa)
- Number: 18

Youth career
- 2016–2024: Red Star Belgrade

Senior career*
Years	Team	Apps	(Gls)
2023–2024	Red Star Belgrade	14	(0)
2023	→ Grafičar (loan)	21	(1)
2024–	Aston Villa	5	(0)
2025–2026	→ RB Leipzig (loan)	15	(0)
2026–	→ Rangers (loan)	3	(0)

International career^{‡}
2021–2022	Serbia U17	12	(0)
2022–2023	Serbia U18	3	(0)
2023–2024	Serbia U19	7	(1)
2024–	Serbia	16	(0)
- * Club domestic league appearances and goals as of 08:45, 11 October 2026 (UTC) ‡ National team caps and goals as of 16 November 2026

Kosta Nedeljković (Serbian Cyrillic: Kоста Недељковић; born 16 December 2005) is a Serbian professional footballer who plays as a right-back for Scottish Premiership club Rangers, on loan from Premier League club Aston Villa and the Serbia national team.

== Club career ==
=== Red Star Belgrade ===
A product of Red Star Belgrade's youth academy, Nedeljković signed his first professional contract with the club in February 2021, which was later extended until December 2022. He played for the club's youth teams until January 2023.

On 26 June 2023, Nedeljković made his senior debut in a pre-season friendly match against FK Sloboda Užice after he was promoted to the 2023–24 season by coach Barak Bakhar.

==== Grafičar Beograd (loan) ====
In January 2023, he was loaned, together with Aleksej Vukičević and Stefan Radujko, to Serbian First League team Grafičar Beograd for the second half of the 2022–23 season.

Nedeljković had 17 appearances for the Grafičar, scoring his first goal on 16 March 2023 and recorded a top speed 36.4 km/h against FK Zlatibor Čajetina, that was comparable to Kylian Mbappé, Achraf Hakimi, and Erling Haaland.

=== Aston Villa ===
On 22 January 2024, Nedeljković signed for Premier League club Aston Villa, remaining at Red Star on loan until the end of the season. The transfer fee was undisclosed, but it was reported to be around £8 million plus add-ons.

After returning to Red Star on loan, Nedeljković suffered a knee injury during a warm weather training camp in Cyprus in the league's winter break and spent time on the sidelines.

On 17 August 2024, 18-year-old Nedeljković made his Premier League debut as a substitute in a 2–1 opening day victory against West Ham United. He became the 1000th player to represent Aston Villa in a competitive match.

==== Loans to RB Leipzig and Rangers ====
On 3 February 2025, Aston Villa loaned Nedeljković out to RB Leipzig for the remainder of the 2024–25 Bundesliga season. On 14 July 2025, Nedeljković re-joined RB Leipzig for a season-long loan.

On 19 August 2026, Nedeljković joined Scottish Premiership club Rangers on a season-long loan with an appearance based, conditional obligation to buy for £4 million.

== International career ==
Nedeljković represented three Serbian youth teams ranged from U17 to U19. In 2023, he was invited to train with the senior Serbia national team, but excluded in the senior squad of any matches.

On 30 August 2024, Nedeljković received his first call-up to the Serbian senior squad ahead of its upcoming 2024–25 UEFA Nations League matches. The same year on 5 September, he made his international senior debut in a goalless Nations League draw against Spain.

== Career statistics ==
=== Club ===
As of match played 11 October 2026

Appearances and goals by club, season and competition
Club	Season	League			National cup (Note: Includes Serbian Cup, FA Cup, DFB-Pokal)		League cup (Note: Includes EFL Cup)		Europe		Other		Total	
Club	Season	Division	Apps	Goals	Apps	Goals	Apps	Goals	Apps	Goals	Apps	Goals	Apps	Goals
Red Star Belgrade	2023–24 (Note: Part of this season was spent on loan from Aston Villa)	Serbian SuperLiga	14	0	2	0	—		4 (Note: Appearances in UEFA Champions League)	0	—		20	0
Grafičar (loan)	2022–23	Serbian First League	15	1	0	0	—		—		2 (Note: Appearances in Serbian First League promotion play-offs)	0	17	1
Grafičar (loan)	2023–24	Serbian First League	6	0	0	0	—		—		—		6	0
Grafičar (loan)	Total		21	1	0	0	—		—		2	0	23	1
Aston Villa	2024–25	Premier League	5	0	1	0	2	0	2	0	—		10	0
Aston Villa	2026–27	Premier League	—		—		—		—		0	0	0	0
Aston Villa	Total		5	0	1	0	2	0	2	0	0	0	10	0
RB Leipzig (loan)	2024–25	Bundesliga	10	0	1	0	—		—		—		11	0
RB Leipzig (loan)	2025–26	Bundesliga	5	0	1	0	—		—		—		6	0
RB Leipzig (loan)	Total		15	0	2	0	—		—		—		17	0
Rangers (loan)	2026–27	Scottish Premiership	3	0	0	0	0	0	2 (Note: Appearances in UEFA Conference League)	0	—		5	0
Career total			58	1	5	0	2	0	7	0	2	0	74	1

=== International ===
As of match played 16 November 2026

Appearances and goals by national team and year
National team	Year	Apps	Goals
Serbia	2024	6	0
Serbia	2025	2	0
Serbia	2026	8	0
Total		16	0

== Honours ==
Red Star Belgrade

- Serbian SuperLiga: 2023–24
- Serbian Cup: 2023–24

Aston Villa

- UEFA Super Cup runner up: 2026–27
