= Vuk Draškić =

Serbian footballer (born 2007)

Personal information
- Full name: Vuk Draškić
- Date of birth: 11 May 2007 (age 19)
- Place of birth: Užice, Serbia
- Height: 1.92 m (6 ft 4 in)
- Position: Goalkeeper

Team information
- Current team: OFK Beograd (on loan from Red Star Belgrade)

Youth career
- Jedinstvo Užice
- Red Star Belgrade

Senior career*
Years	Team	Apps	(Gls)
2024–	Red Star Belgrade	0	(0)
2025	→ Grafičar Beograd (loan)	15	(0)
2025	→ OFK Beograd (loan)	0	(0)
2026	→ Železničar Pančevo (loan)	0	(0)
2026–	→ OFK Beograd (loan)	0	(0)

International career^{‡}
2021	Serbia U15	1	(0)
2022–2023	Serbia U16	0	(0)
2024–	Serbia U19	9	(0)
- * Club domestic league appearances and goals as of 24 May 2025 ‡ National team caps and goals as of 28 March 2026

Vuk Draškić (Serbian Cyrillic: Вук Драшкић; born 11 May 2007) is a Serbian professional footballer who plays as a goalkeeper for OFK Beograd in the Serbian SuperLiga on loan from Red Star Belgrade.

== Career ==
Draškić joined Red Star Belgrade in 2020 and has been playing for the club's youth teams since then. He extended his contract until the summer of 2023. He stood out with his performances in the 2023–24 UEFA Youth League and the Serbian Youth League, which earned him the trust of the first team coach.

He made his debut for the first team on 24 January 2024 in a friendly match against Spartak Subotica.

== Career statistics ==
As of match played 5 March 2026

Appearances and goals by club, season and competition
Club	Season	League			Cup		Europe		Other		Total	
Club	Season	Division	Apps	Goals	Apps	Goals	Apps	Goals	Apps	Goals	Apps	Goals
Red Star Belgrade	2024–25	Serbian SuperLiga	0	0	0	0	0	0	—		0	0
Red Star Belgrade	2025–26	Serbian SuperLiga	0	0	1	0	—		—		1	0
Red Star Belgrade	Total		0	0	1	0	0	0	0	0	1	0
Grafičar Beograd (loan)	2024–25	Serbian SuperLiga	15	0	—		—		—		15	0
OFK Beograd (loan)	2025–26	Serbian SuperLiga	0	0	0	0	—		—		0	0
Career total			15	0	1	0	0	0	0	0	16	0
