= Trifunović =

Trifunović (Serbian Cyrillic: Tpифунoвић, pronounced [trifǔːnoʋitɕ]) is a Serbian surname, derived from the given name "Trifun" (from Greek Tryphon), which may refer to:

- Aleksandar Trifunović (basketball) (born 1967), basketballer
- Aleksandar Trifunović (footballer) (born 1954), footballer played for Partizan Belgrade et al., and for Yugoslavia
- Branislav Trifunović (born 1978), actor and film producer
- Duško Trifunović (1933–2006), poet and writer
- Ilija Trifunović-Birčanin (1877–1943), World War II Chetnik commander
- Miloš Trifunović (footballer) (born 1984), footballer
- Miloš Trifunović (politician) (1871–1957), politician
- Petar Trifunović (1910–1980), chess grandmaster
- Sergej Trifunović (born 1972), actor
