= 2023–24 Serbian First League =

Serbian football league season

Serbian First League
- Season: 2023–24
- Dates: 5 August 2023 – 26 May 2024
- Champions: OFK Beograd
- Promoted: OFK Beograd; Jedinstvo Ub; Tekstilac Odžaci
- Relegated: RFK Novi Sad 1921; Radnički Beograd
- Matches: 296
- Goals: 639 (2.16 per match)
- Top goalscorer: Dejan Georgijević (15 goals)
- Biggest home win: Tekstilac 5 – 0 Radnički Beograd
- Biggest away win: Grafičar 0 – 5 OFK Beograd
- Highest scoring: Dubočica 3 – 5 OFK Beograd
- Longest winning run: Inđija, OFK Beograd (4 games)
- Longest unbeaten run: OFK Beograd (15 games)
- Longest winless run: Mladost GAT (13 games)
- Longest losing run: Five teams (4 games)

The 2023–24 Serbian First League is the 19th season of the Serbian First League since its establishment.

== League format ==
The league consist of 16 teams: ten teams from the previous season, two teams relegated from 2022–23 Serbian SuperLiga and four new teams promoted from Serbian League. Tekstilac will make their debut in competition. Each team will play each other twice in round-robin format after which top half will play in Promotion round and bottom half in Relegation round Play-offs. First two teams from the Promotion round will be promoted to next season of Serbian Superliga, while third and fourth team will play in a Relegation Play-off. Last four teams from Relegation round will be relegated.

== Teams ==
Location of teams in the 2023–24 Serbian First league
Locations of the 2023–24 Serbian First League teams from Belgrade
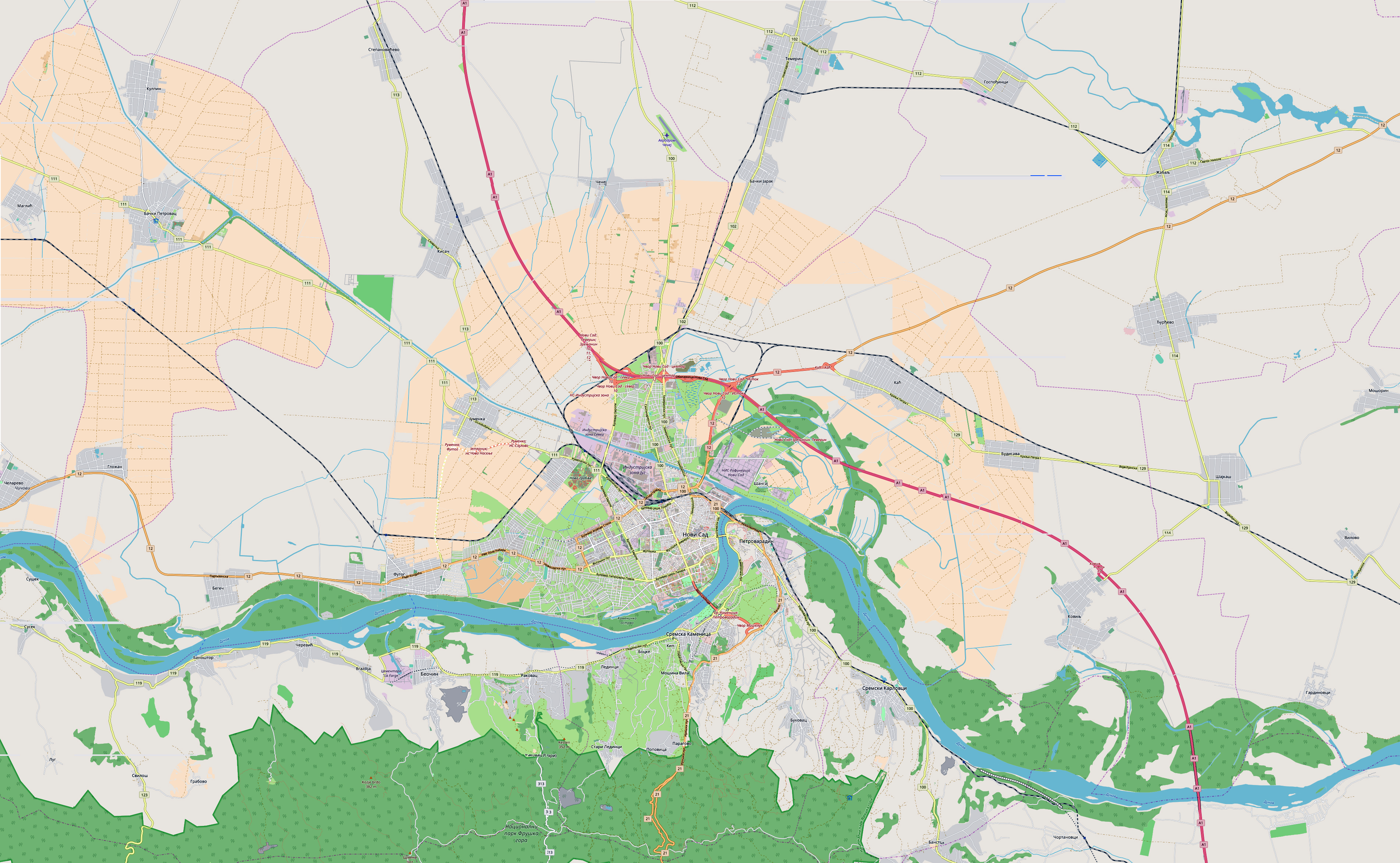
Locations of the 2023–24 Serbian First League teams on the territory of Novi Sad

Team	City	Stadium	Capacity
Dubočica	Leskovac	Dubočica Stadium	8,136
Grafičar	Belgrade	South artificial grass field of Red Star Stadium	1,000
Inđija Toyo Tires	Inđija	Toyo Tires Arena	4,500
Jedinstvo	Ub	Stadion "Dragan Džajić"	4,000
Kolubara	Lazarevac	Kolubara Stadium	2,500
Mačva	Šabac	Stadion FK Mačva Šabac	5,494
Metalac	Gornji Milanovac	Stadion Metalac	4,400
Mladost GAT	Novi Sad	GAT Arena	1,400
Novi Sad 1921	Čelarevo	Stadion "ČSK Čelarevo"	3,000
OFK Beograd	Belgrade	Omladinski Stadium	19,100
OFK Vršac	Vršac	Gradski stadion Vršac	5,000
Radnički	New Belgrade	Stadion FK Radnički (NBG)	5,000
Radnički	Sremska Mitrovica	Gradski stadion	2,000
Sloboda	Užice	Radomir Antić Stadium	12,000
Smederevo 1924	Smederevo	Smederevo Stadium	17,200
Tekstilac	Odžaci	Gradski stadion Odžaci	3,000

== Regular season ==
=== League table ===
Pos	Team	Pld	W	D	L	GF	GA	GD	Pts	Qualification
1	OFK Beograd	30	19	5	6	54	25	+29	62	Qualification for the Championship round
2	Jedinstvo	30	15	7	8	38	30	+8	52	Qualification for the Championship round
3	Inđija	30	15	5	10	37	25	+12	50	Qualification for the Championship round
4	Tekstilac	30	13	9	8	37	21	+16	48 (Note: Tekstilac are ahead of Smederevo 1924 on head-to-head points: Tekstilac; 4, Smederevo 1924; 0.)	Qualification for the Championship round
5	Smederevo 1924	30	12	12	6	34	23	+11	48	Qualification for the Championship round
6	Radnički SM	30	11	9	10	27	27	0	42 (Note: Radnički SM are ahead of Mačva and Grafičar on head-to-head points: Radnički SM; 9, Mačva; 5, Grafičar; 2.)	Qualification for the Championship round
7	Mačva	30	11	9	10	29	24	+5	42	Qualification for the Championship round
8	Grafičar	30	11	9	10	43	42	+1	42	Qualification for the Championship round
9	Dubočica	30	10	11	9	26	30	−4	41	Qualification for the Relegation round
10	OFK Vršac	30	10	9	11	25	27	−2	39	Qualification for the Relegation round
11	Metalac	30	9	10	11	25	31	−6	37	Qualification for the Relegation round
12	Kolubara	30	9	9	12	38	40	−2	36	Qualification for the Relegation round
13	Mladost GAT	30	8	10	12	29	34	−5	34	Qualification for the Relegation round
14	Sloboda	30	8	9	13	22	31	−9	33	Qualification for the Relegation round
15	Novi Sad 1921	30	6	4	20	25	52	−27	22	Qualification for the Relegation round
16	Radnički Beograd (Note: Radnički Beograd were deducted 6 points due to match fixing.)	30	6	7	17	27	54	−27	19	Qualification for the Relegation round

Source: First league (in Serbian)
Rules for classification: 1) Points; 2) Head-to-head points; 3) Head-to-head goal difference; 4) Head-to-head goals scored; 5) Head-to-head away goals scored (if two teams tied); 6) Goal difference; 7) Goals scored; 8) Fair play ranking; 9) Draw.

=== Results ===
Home \ Away	DUB	GRA	INĐ	JED	KOL	MAČ	MET	MNS	NVS	OFK	VRŠ	RBG	RSM	SLO	SME	TEK
Dubočica		2–1	2–1	1–0	1–1	0–1	1–0	1–2	2–1	3–5	1–0	1–1	0–0	1–0	2–1	0–0
Grafičar	1–2		1–0	3–0	1–0	2–2	1–1	2–1	2–1	0–5	1–2	4–2	0–1	5–1	1–2	2–2
Inđija	2–2	0–0		0–1	0–2	3–1	0–1	2–0	2–1	0–2	2–1	4–0	2–0	2–0	1–2	1–0
Jedinstvo	2–0	3–1	1–1		3–2	1–0	2–0	1–1	4–0	0–3	1–1	2–1	1–0	1–0	0–0	1–1
Kolubara	1–1	1–0	0–3	1–3		3–2	1–1	0–2	4–1	1–1	4–0	2–0	1–3	0–0	2–4	1–1
Mačva	0–1	0–0	2–1	1–0	1–0		2–0	2–0	2–1	1–1	0–0	3–0	3–0	0–0	2–1	0–0
Metalac	0–0	1–3	0–2	0–0	2–2	1–2		0–0	4–2	2–0	1–1	2–0	1–0	2–1	0–0	0–0
Mladost GAT	1–1	0–0	0–1	3–4	3–1	1–0	1–0		0–1	3–1	1–2	0–1	1–1	0–1	1–1	0–0
Novi Sad 1921	0–0	2–2	0–1	0–2	0–2	1–0	0–1	3–1		1–0	3–2	1–1	2–2	0–4	0–1	1–0
OFK Beograd	1–0	0–2	0–0	3–0	4–1	2–1	4–1	2–0	4–1		1–0	2–2	1–0	1–0	1–2	2–0
OFK Vršac	0–0	2–3	0–1	1–0	1–0	0–0	1–0	2–0	1–0	1–1		0–1	1–0	2–0	1–1	2–1
Radnički Beograd	2–0	1–1	1–1	1–2	0–4	1–1	2–0	2–2	3–1	1–2	1–0		0–1	0–1	0–3	1–3
Radnički SM	1–1	2–1	1–2	4–1	2–0	1–0	0–1	0–0	1–0	0–1	0–0	1–0		1–1	0–0	1–0
Sloboda	1–0	1–1	0–1	1–0	0–0	2–0	0–0	0–2	2–1	0–2	1–1	3–1	0–1		1–1	0–2
Smederevo 1924	3–0	1–2	2–0	0–2	0–0	0–0	2–1	1–1	1–0	1–2	1–0	2–1	1–1	0–0		0–0
Tekstilac	1–0	4–0	2–1	0–0	0–1	1–0	1–2	1–2	1–0	1–0	1–0	5–0	5–2	3–1	1–0	

Source: First league (in Serbian)
Legend: Blue = home team win; Yellow = draw; Red = away team win.
For upcoming matches, an "a" indicates there is an article about the rivalry between the two participants.

== Individual statistics ==
=== Top scorers ===
As of matches played on 19 May 2024.

Pos	Scorer	Teams	Goals
1	(Serbia) Dejan Georgijević	OFK Beograd	17
2	(Ghana) Kwaku Karikari	Jedinstvo	16
3	(Ghana) Zubairu Ibrahim	Jedinstvo	12
4	(Serbia) Nikola Furtula	Kolubara	11
5	(Serbia) Saša Marković	OFK Beograd	10

=== Hat-tricks ===
Player	For	Against	Result	Date
(Bosnia and Herzegovina) Aleksandar Kahvić	OFK Beograd	Metalac	4–1	13 August 2023
(Bosnia and Herzegovina) Aleksandar Kahvić	OFK Beograd	Dubočica	5–3	3 September 2023
(Serbia) Darko Stojanović	Tekstilac	Radnički Beograd	5–0	11 December 2023

== Attendances ==
#	Club	Average
1	Dubočica	2,112
2	Sloboda	1,191
3	Smederevo	1,161
4	Jedinstvo	900
5	Mačva	835
6	Metalac	579
7	OFK	478
8	Tekstilac	387
9	Mladost	381
10	Inđija	349
11	Vršac	317
12	Kolubara	316
13	Radnički SM	311
14	Grafičar	276
15	Radnički	215
16	Novi Sad	187
