= Vukosavljević =

Vukosavljević (Serbian Cyrillic: Вукосављевић) is a Serbian surname. Notable people with the surname include:

- Branislav Vukosavljević (1929–1985), Serbian footballer and manager
- Rade Vukosavljević (born 1959), Serbian basketball player
- Sava Vukosavljević (born 1996), Serbian footballer currently playing for Proleter Novi Sad
- Vladan Vukosavljević (disambiguation), several people
