= OFK Vršac =

Serbian football club

- Full name: Omladinski Fudbalski Klub Vršac
- Founded: 2 April 2007; 19 years ago
- Ground: City Stadium Vršac
- Capacity: 5,000
- President: Zoran Kostadinov
- Head coach: Darko Rakočević
- League: Serbian First League
- 2025–26: Serbian First League, 5th of 16
- Website: ofkvrsac.com
Home colours	Away colours

OFK Vršac (Serbian Cyrillic: ОФК Вршац) is a professional football club based in Vršac, Vojvodina, Serbia. They compete in the Serbian First League, the second tier of the national league system.

== History ==
Founded in April 2007 as OFK Vršac United, the club changed its name to OFK Vršac in December 2017. They subsequently won the Vojvodina League East in the 2017–18 season and took promotion to the Serbian League Vojvodina.

After spending five seasons in the third tier, the club won the title in 2021–22 and took promotion to the Serbian First League for the first time ever.

== Honours ==
Serbian League Vojvodina (Tier 3)

- 2021–22

Vojvodina League East (Tier 4)

- 2017–18

== Seasons ==
Season	League									Cup
Season	Division	Pld	W	D	L	GF	GA	Pts	Pos	Cup
Serbia
2014–15	4 – Banat	30	11	10	9	32	32	43	6th	—
2015–16	4 – Banat	30	14	5	11	43	38	47	5th	—
2016–17	4 – Vojvodina East	30	12	7	11	47	48	43	5th	—
2017–18	4 – Vojvodina East	30	21	7	2	73	28	70	1st	—
2018–19	3 – Vojvodina	32	12	7	13	36	36	43	7th	—
2019–20	3 – Vojvodina	17 (Note: The season was cut short due to the COVID-19 pandemic in Serbia.)	9	2	6	28	23	29	4th	—
2020–21	3 – Vojvodina	38	23	8	7	71	34	77	2nd	—
2021–22	3 – Vojvodina	30	19	5	6	64	37	62	1st	—
2022–23	2	37	13	9	15	39	42	48	10th	—
2023–24	2	37	14	11	12	33	31	53	9th	Round of 16
2024–25	2	37	13	10	14	34	39	49	7th	Round of 16

== Current squad ==
As of 4 August 2026

Note: Flags indicate national team as defined under FIFA eligibility rules; some limited exceptions apply. Players may hold more than one non-FIFA nationality.

No.	Pos.	Nation	Player
2	DF	SRB	Dragan Bojat
3	MF	SRB	Dimitrije Petronijević
5	DF	SRB	Stefan Nikolić
7	FW	SRB	Đorđe Glavinić
8	MF	SRB	Danko Kiković (captain)
9	MF	SRB	Miloš Milivojević
11	MF	SRB	Novak Gojkov
12	GK	SRB	Aleksandar Stanković
14	MF	SRB	Aleksa Milosavljević
15	DF	SRB	Vukašin Kravić (on loan from Vojvodina)
16	FW	BIH	Srđan Bašić (on loan from Vojvodina)
17	FW	SRB	Andrej Popov

No.	Pos.	Nation	Player
19	MF	SRB	Vukota Životić
22	FW	SRB	Uroš Čejić
24	DF	SRB	Kosta Janjić
25	MF	NGR	Ezekiel Atem
26	DF	SRB	Miloš Ostojić
30	DF	SRB	Marko Janković
31	MF	SRB	Luka Serdar
32	DF	SRB	Stefan Radojičić
33	MF	SRB	Andrej Pivaš (on loan from Vojvodina)
42	GK	SRB	Luka Lazin
79	FW	SRB	Vladan Bala
99	FW	SRB	Stefan Kostadinov

=== Other players under contract ===
Note: Flags indicate national team as defined under FIFA eligibility rules; some limited exceptions apply. Players may hold more than one non-FIFA nationality.

No.	Pos.	Nation	Player
—	GK	SRB	Danilo Đulčić
—	DF	SRB	Bojan Pajović
—	DF	POR	Helderiquen
—	DF	MNE	Luka Bubanja
—	DF	SRB	Marko Velevski

No.	Pos.	Nation	Player
—	DF	SRB	Vukašin Kojić
—	MF	SRB	Milan Bajić
—	MF	SRB	Ognjen Milićević
—	FW	SRB	Uroš Stevančević
—	FW	SRB	Nikola Dišić

=== Out on loan ===
Note: Flags indicate national team as defined under FIFA eligibility rules; some limited exceptions apply. Players may hold more than one non-FIFA nationality.

No.	Pos.	Nation	Player

=== Coaching staff ===
Position	Name
Head coach	(Serbia) Darko Rakočević
Assistant coach	(Serbia) Marko Kačarević (Serbia) Petar Marinković
Goalkeeping coach	(Serbia) Nemanja Jeveričić (Serbia) Ljuban Vučković
Physiotherapist	(Serbia) Jelena Rankov (Serbia) Jovana Kuzmanović
Doctor	(Serbia) Euđen Morariju-Bajaš (Serbia) Aleksandru-Dino Lađa
Security commissioner	(Serbia) Dragan Birđan
General secretary	(Serbia) Aleksandar Kirkov
Sporting director	(Serbia) Vladimir Popov
Public relations	(Serbia) Jelena Nešković

== Notable players ==
This is a list of players who have played at full international level.

- (North Macedonia) Aleksandar Lazevski

For a list of all OFK Vršac players with a Wikipedia article, see Category:OFK Vršac players.

== Managerial history ==
Period	Name
2017–2018	(Serbia) Nenad Mijailović
2018	(Serbia) Neško Milovanović
2019	(Serbia) Nenad Kovačević
2019	(Serbia) Radovan Radaković
2019–2023	(Serbia) Nenad Mijailović
2023–2024	(Serbia) Zoran Kostić
2024–	(Serbia) Igor Savić
