= 2022–23 Serbian First League =

Serbian football league season

Serbian First League
- Season: 2022–23
- Dates: 30 July 2022 – May 2023
- Champions: IMT
- Promoted: IMT; Železničar
- Relegated: Loznica; Trayal; Zlatibor; Rad
- Matches: 296
- Goals: 711 (2.4 per match)
- Top goalscorer: Krsta Đorđević, Miloš Luković (15 goals each)
- Biggest home win: IMT 7 – 1 Novi Sad 1921
- Biggest away win: Sloboda 0 – 4 OFK Vršac
- Highest scoring: Železničar 5 – 3 Jedinstvo; IMT 7 – 1 Novi Sad 1921
- Longest winning run: Grafičar, Novi Sad 1921, Železničar 5 games
- Longest unbeaten run: IMT, Radnički Sremska Mitrovica, Sloboda 10 games
- Longest winless run: Rad 11 games
- Longest losing run: Grafičar, Metalac, Rad, Radnički, Zlatibor 4 games

The 2022–23 Serbian First League was the 18th season of the Serbian First League since its establishment.

== League format ==
The league consisted of 16 teams: seven teams from the previous season, one team relegated from 2021–22 Serbian SuperLiga, five new teams promoted from Serbian League and Novi Sad 1921 who was merged with Proleter Novi Sad. Each time will play each other twice in round-robin format after which top half will play in Promotion round and bottom half in Relegation round Play-offs. First two teams from the Promotion round will be promoted to next season of Serbian Superliga, while third and fourth team will play in a Promotion Play-off. Last four teams from Relegation round will be relegated.

== Teams ==
Location of teams in the 2022–23 Serbian First league
Locations of the 2022–23 Serbian First League teams from Belgrade

Team	City	Stadium	Capacity
Grafičar	Belgrade	South artificial grass field of Red Star Stadium	1,000
IMT	Belgrade	Stadion FK IMT	1,150
Inđija	Inđija	Inđija Stadium	4,500
Jedinstvo	Ub	Stadion Dragan Džajić	4,000
Loznica	Loznica	Lagator Stadium	5,000
Mačva	Šabac	Mačva Stadium	5,494
Metalac	Gornji Milanovac	Stadion Metalac	4,400
Novi Sad 1921	Novi Sad	Detelinara Stadium	6,000
OFK Vršac	Vršac	Vršac City Stadium	5,000
Rad	Belgrade	King Peter I Stadium	3,919
Radnički	Belgrade	Stadion kraj Studenjaka	5,000
Radnički	Sremska Mitrovica	Stadion FK Radnički	2,000
Sloboda	Užice	Radomir Antić Stadium	12,000
Trayal	Kruševac	Stadion FK Trayal	1,500
Železničar	Pančevo	SC Mladost	1,200
Zlatibor	Čajetina	Stadion Švajcarija	1,040

== Regular season ==
=== League table ===
Pos	Team	Pld	W	D	L	GF	GA	GD	Pts	Qualification (Note: Teams will be split into two groups (Final A and Final B) after each have played 30 matches.)
1	IMT	30	18	7	5	45	27	+18	61	Promotion to the Serbian SuperLiga
2	Železničar	30	17	6	7	47	25	+22	57	Promotion to the Serbian SuperLiga
3	Grafičar	30	15	5	10	57	38	+19	50	Qualification for play-off
4	Radnički SM	30	11	12	7	30	26	+4	45	Qualification for play-off
5	Jedinstvo	30	12	8	10	32	26	+6	44	
6	Novi Sad	30	12	7	11	34	31	+3	43	
7	Inđija	30	10	13	7	38	30	+8	43	
8	Radnički NB	30	12	4	14	27	35	−8	40	
9	Sloboda	30	7	16	7	33	34	−1	37	
10	OFK Vršac	30	10	7	13	28	33	−5	37	
11	Mačva	30	8	13	9	28	31	−3	37	
12	Metalac	30	9	8	13	29	36	−7	35	
13	Trayal	30	9	8	13	29	37	−8	35	Relegation to Serbian League
14	Loznica	30	7	10	13	28	45	−17	31	Relegation to Serbian League
15	Rad	30	5	13	12	32	46	−14	28	Relegation to Serbian League
16	Zlatibor	30	4	11	15	26	43	−17	23	Relegation to Serbian League

Updated to match(es) played on completed. Source: First league (in Serbian)
Rules for classification: 1) Points; 2) Head-to-head points; 3) Head-to-head goal difference; 4) Head-to-head goals scored; 5) Head-to-head away goals scored (if two teams tied); 6) Goal difference; 7) Goals scored; 8) Fair play ranking; 9) Draw.

=== Results ===
Home \ Away	IMT	ŽEL	GRA	RSM	JED	NVS	RBG	INĐ	SLO	VRŠ	MAČ	MET	TRA	LOZ	RAD	ZLA
IMT		0–0	3–0	2–0	2–1	4–1	1–1	0–0	1–0	4–2	1–3	2–1	3–2	1–0	2–2	1–0
Železničar	2–0		1–3	1–2	2–1	1–0	3–0	1–0	6–1	1–0	3–1	4–1	1–0	5–0	4–1	0–2
Grafičar	1–0	0–1		2–2	2–0	0–2	0–1	1–1	2–4	4–2	2–1	2–0	2–0	5–1	6–1	5–1
Radnički SM	2–1	0–0	3–1		1–0	1–0	2–1	1–1	0–0	0–0	1–0	2–1	0–0	1–1	2–0	1–3
Jedinstvo	0–1	0–2	1–2	2–0		1–1	2–0	3–0	1–1	2–0	1–0	3–1	1–0	0–0	0–0	2–0
Novi Sad	2–1	0–1	1–1	1–4	2–0		1–0	1–1	0–0	1–0	0–0	0–1	2–1	0–2	2–0	4–1
Radnički NB	0–2	1–2	2–1	1–0	2–0	1–0		0–1	1–0	2–1	0–2	2–0	0–0	2–0	2–1	1–0
Inđija	0–1	4–1	0–1	0–1	2–1	2–3	3–0		0–0	0–1	3–0	2–2	1–0	1–0	0–0	1–1
Sloboda	1–2	2–2	2–1	0–0	0–0	3–1	0–0	2–2		0–0	2–1	2–0	1–0	2–2	1–1	3–0
OFK Vršac	0–1	1–1	0–2	2–1	0–1	2–0	2–1	0–0	0–0		3–0	1–0	2–1	1–0	0–1	3–1
Mačva	0–0	2–0	2–2	0–0	1–1	0–1	2–1	2–2	0–0	2–1		1–0	3–1	1–3	1–1	0–0
Metalac	1–2	1–0	1–3	2–0	0–1	1–0	2–0	1–1	4–3	4–1	1–1		1–0	0–1	1–0	0–0
Trayal	2–3	1–0	2–1	0–0	2–0	0–3	3–2	1–1	2–1	0–0	0–1	1–1		1–0	2–1	2–1
Loznica	1–1	0–0	2–1	1–0	1–3	1–4	1–2	1–3	0–0	0–1	0–0	1–1	1–1		2–5	2–0
Rad	2–3	1–1	0–3	2–2	1–2	0–0	2–0	2–3	1–1	1–1	1–1	0–0	1–2	1–1		2–1
Zlatibor	0–0	0–1	1–1	1–1	0–0	1–1	1–1	2–3	4–1	2–1	0–0	0–0	1–2	2–3	0–1	

Source: First league (in Serbian)
Legend: Blue = home team win; Yellow = draw; Red = away team win.
For upcoming matches, an "a" indicates there is an article about the rivalry between the two participants.

== Play-offs ==
=== Championship round ===
The top eight teams advanced from the regular season. Teams played each other once.

==== League table ====
Pos	Team	Pld	W	D	L	GF	GA	GD	Pts	Qualification	IMT	ŽEL	GRA	INĐ	RSM	JED	NVS	RBG
1	IMT (C, P)	37	22	9	6	63	36	+27	75	Promotion to the Serbian SuperLiga		1–1	0–0			4–3	7–1	
2	Železničar (P)	37	20	8	9	63	35	+28	68	Promotion to the Serbian SuperLiga			2–2	0–1	3–0	5–3		
3	Grafičar	37	17	9	11	65	46	+19	60	Qualification for play-off					2–2	1–1	2–0	1–0
4	Inđija	37	13	15	9	46	35	+11	54	Qualification for play-off	2–0		3–0					0–1
5	Radnički SM	37	13	14	10	43	38	+5	53		1–3			1–1			4–2	5–0
6	Jedinstvo	37	14	11	12	45	38	+7	53					1–1	1–0		3–0	
7	Novi Sad	37	14	8	15	44	51	−7	50			3–2		2–0				2–2
8	Radnički NB	37	13	6	18	32	50	−18	45		1–3	0–3				1–1		

Source: First League (in Serbian)
Legend: Blue = home team win; Yellow = draw; Red = away team win.
Rules for classification: 1) Points; 2) Points in regular season; 3) Head-to-head points in regular season; 4) Head-to-head goal difference in regular season; 5) Head-to-head goals scored in regular season; 6) Head-to-head away goals scored in regular season (if two teams tied); 7) Goal difference; 8) Goals scored; 9) Fair play ranking; 10) Drawing of lots.
(C) Champions; (P) Promoted

=== Relegations round ===
The bottom eight teams advanced from the regular season. Teams played each other once.

==== League table ====
Pos	Team	Pld	W	D	L	GF	GA	GD	Pts	Qualification	SLO	VRŠ	MAČ	MET	LOZ	TRA	ZLA	RAD
9	Sloboda	37	11	18	8	42	41	+1	51			0–4	1–0		3–0	1–0		
10	OFK Vršac	37	13	9	15	39	42	−3	48				2–2	1–4		2–1		0–0
11	Mačva	37	11	15	11	37	40	−3	48					1–1	2–1	2–1	0–2	
12	Metalac	37	12	12	13	42	42	0	48		1–1				1–0		1–1	4–1
13	Loznica (R)	37	10	11	16	40	54	−14	41	Relegation to Serbian League		2–1					5–1	3–0
14	Trayal (R)	37	10	10	17	37	46	−9	40	Relegation to Serbian League				1–1	1–1			4–0
15	Zlatibor (R)	37	7	12	18	36	54	−18	33	Relegation to Serbian League	1–2	0–1				2–0		
16	Rad (R)	37	5	15	17	37	63	−26	30	Relegation to Serbian League	1–1		1–2				2–3	

Source: First League (in Serbian)
Legend: Blue = home team win; Yellow = draw; Red = away team win.
Rules for classification: 1) Points; 2) Points in regular season; 3) Head-to-head points in regular season; 4) Head-to-head goal difference in regular season; 5) Head-to-head goals scored in regular season; 6) Head-to-head away goals scored in regular season (if two teams tied); 7) Goal difference; 8) Goals scored; 9) Fair play ranking; 10) Drawing of lots.
(R) Relegated

== Individual statistics ==
=== Top goalscorers ===
As of matches played on 28 May 2023.

Pos	Scorer	Teams	Goals
1	(Serbia) Krsta Đorđević	Radnički SM	15
1	(Serbia) Miloš Luković	IMT	15
3	(Serbia) Slaviša Stojanović	Inđija	14
4	(Serbia) Dario Grgić	Železničar	13
4	(Bosnia and Herzegovina) Dragiša Komarčević	Loznica	13
4	(Ghana) Kwaku Karikari	Jedinstvo	13

=== Hat-tricks ===
Player	For	Against	Result	Date
(Serbia) Nikola Dišić	Zlatibor	Sloboda	4–1	4 September 2022
(Serbia) Jovan Mituljikić	Grafičar	Rad	6–1	12 November 2022

== Attendances ==
#	Club	Average
1	Sloboda	1,734
2	Vršac	861
3	Želeničar	805
4	Mačva	759
5	Jedinstvo	660
6	Metalac	536
7	IMT	440
8	Trayal	427
9	Inđija	396
10	Loznica	372
11	Radnički	321
12	Radnički SM	321
13	Novi Sad	310
14	Grafičar	298
15	Rad	293
16	Zlatibor	237
