= 2021–22 Red Star Belgrade season =

Red Star Belgrade
2021–22 season
- President: Svetozar Mijailović
- Manager: Dejan Stanković
- Stadium: Rajko Mitić Stadium
- Serbian SuperLiga: 1st
- Serbian Cup: Winners
- UEFA Champions League: Third qualifying round
- UEFA Europa League: Round of 16
- Top goalscorer: League: Aleksandar Katai (24); All: Aleksandar Katai (33)
- Highest home attendance: League: 44,788 (27 Feb 2022 v Partizan, R24); All: 47,024 (17 March 2022 v Rangers, EL R16)
- Lowest home attendance: 5,157 (27 April 2022 v Čukarički, R33)
- Average home league attendance: 14688
Home colours	Away colours	Third colours

The 2021–22 Red Star Belgrade season was the club's 16th in the Serbian SuperLiga and 76th consecutive season in the top flight of Yugoslav and Serbian football. The club participated in the Serbian SuperLiga, Serbian Cup, UEFA Europa League and qualifications for UEFA Champions League.

== Summary ==
=== Pre-season ===
The first signing for the new season was Austrian international Aleksandar Dragović who came in as a free agent from Germany where he spent last four and a half seasons playing for Bayer Leverkusen. Dragović, who also holds Serbian citizenship and therefore will not be counted as a foreign player in Serbian SuperLiga, signed three-year contract on 26 May 2021. Dragović was also only member of the club's squad that was selected in the final squad of his national team for the UEFA Euro 2020. He was starter in all 4 matches Austria played, being in the end eliminated in round of 16 by Italy.

The first departure was Nemanja Milunović who left the club after his two and a half season contract signed in December 2018 expired. During his spell at the club he played 87 matches in all competitions and scored 9 goals. He left the club to join Turkish side Alanyaspor as a free agent after winning three domestic titles and one domestic cup with Red Star.

On 7 June 2021 Željko Gavrić, who is a product of club's academy, made his international debut for Serbia national football team in a friendly match against Jamaica. Match ended in a 1–1 draw and he was a starter, being substituted at half time.

On 10 June 2021 Aleksandar Katai, who arrived at the club and was one of the best players in the previous season, signed a new three-years contract extending his second spell at the club until summer of 2024.

Red Star officially started their pre-season with medical checks on 22 June 2021 on their home ground in Belgrade. Training camp will move to Austrian town Stegersbach between 24 June and 9 July 2021. Four friendly matches were played in Austria, against GAK, Aris, Argeș Pitești and Sturm Graz.

On 23 June 2021 Srđan Babić signed a new two-years contract until summer of 2023. He arrived in Red Star in summer of 2017 and spent previous season on loan at Portuguese side Famalicão.

On 24 June 2021 club announced that they would not be buying out contract of an Italian striker Diego Falcinelli. He spent previous season in the club on the loan from Italian side Bologna, scoring 13 goals. Club also announced that four young players were recalled from their loans and added to the first squad for the summer training camp: Lazetić, Matić and Nikola Stanković from Grafičar and Gordić from Mačva Šabac. After the end of summer training camp Matić was returned to Grafičar on another loan.

=== July ===
On 1 July 2021 Red Star brought back Nenad Krstičić from Greek side AEK Athens. He spent his first spell at the club between 2017 and 2019 during which he played 64 games and scored 6 goals. Krstičić signed two-years contract with the club. On the same date club also signed young midfielder Petar Stanić from Železničar Pančevo. He signed a four-years contract.

On 3 July 2021 club announced that they signed three-years contract with Norwegian international forward Ohi Omoijuanfo. He will join the club for free at the end of his current contract with Norwegian side Molde in January 2022.

On 5 July 2021 two more signings were announced. First one was Serbian under-21 international Milan Ilić who arrived from Loznica after his previous contract expired. He signed three-years contract with the club, and was later loaned back to Loznica. Second signing was French striker Loïs Diony. He arrived on one-year loan from Ligue 1 side Angers SCO with 1.2 million euros buyout option.

Serbian SuperLiga started on 16 July with home game against Vojvodina which ended in goalless draw with newcomer Dragović making a debut. By the end of the month Red Star played another home game against Mladost winning 1–0 and away game at Spartak winning 3–1 with a goalkeeper Miloš Gordić making a debut.

Red Star started their European season on 21 July 2021 in second qualifying round of UEFA Champions League. Draw for that round was held on 16 June 2021 and Red Star was drawn to play against Kazak champion Kairat who were the winners of first qualifying round fixture against Israeli champion Maccabi Haifa. This was the third time in history that Red Star and Kairat played against each other. Last time they played in 2015–16 Europa League qualifications, in fixtures that was won by Kairat. Red Star won the fixture 6–2 on aggregate, with first leg played in Kazakhstan ending in Kairat's victory 2–1 and second leg played in Belgrade ending in Red Star's 5–0 victory.

=== August ===
During the August club played three matches in Serbian Superliga against Napredak, TSC and Čukarički winning all three of them, extending their unbeaten run since the start of the season to 6 games and winning run to 5 games. In last of those matches, against Čukarički, Petar Stanić made his debut for the club after coming in as a substitution.

In the third qualifying round of UEFA Champions League Red Star was drawn against Moldovan champion Sheriff Tiraspol who previously eliminated Armenian champion Alashkert. Fixture ended with Red Star being eliminated 1–2 on aggregate. First fixture was played on 3 August in Belgrade and ended in 1–1 draw, and second one was played on 10 August in Tiraspol and ended in 1–0 defeat. This was the first time in history that these two side played each other.

After being eliminated from the UEFA Champions League Red Star was transferred to 2021–22 UEFA Europa League play-off round. They were drawn to play against Romanian champions CFR Cluj who were previously also eliminated from Champions League by Swiss champion Young Boys. This was the first time in history that these two sides played each other. Red Star won 6–2 on aggregate and qualified for the Europa League group stage for a second consecutive season. First leg was played on 19 August in Belgrade and ended in 4–0 win for the club, while second leg was played on 26 August in Cluj-Napoca and ended in 2–1 win. In the first match Comorian forward Ben scored his 14th goal for the Red Star in international competitions making him top foreign scorer in the history of the club and fifth overall.

In draw that took place on 27 August in Istanbul Red Star was drawn to play in Europa League Group F together with Portuguese Cup winner Braga, Bulgarian champion Ludogorets Razgrad and Danish vice champion Midtjylland. This will be third time that club will play against Braga, second time against Ludogorets and first time against Midtjylland. Matches in the group stage will be played between September and December.

On 12 August, two days after being eliminated from the UEFA Champions League, club sold young winger Željko Gavrić to Hungarian champions Ferencvárosi for an estimated fee of €1.2 million.

On 13 August 2021 Milan Pavkov extended his contract with Red Star to the summer of 2024.

On 30 August 2021 Serbian defender Srđan Babić was loaned to the Segunda División side Almería with a buy out option at the end of the season. On the same day club signed Dutch forward Richairo Živković. Former Netherlands under-21 international player arrived from Chinese side Changchun Yatai and signed three-years contract.

=== September ===
During the September's international window Red Star had 4 first team players who received call-ups for their national teams to play in the 2022 FIFA World Cup qualification. Goalkeeper Milan Borjan made three caps for Canada and conceded two goals. Defender Miloš Degenek was part of the Australian team but failed to make an appearance, while another defender Aleksandar Dragović made two more caps for Austria making him second most capped player in the history of Austria. And Guélor Kanga made two caps for the Gabon. Besides those four players Ben made two more caps for Comores in friendly games scoring a hat-trick in one of them, Miloš Gordić, Strahinja Eraković, Nikola Stanković and Marko Lazetić represented Serbian youth teams and Richard Odada who plays on a loan at Metalac made his international debut for Kenya.

Three matches were played in Serbian SuperLiga. In the first of them, 3–0 victory against Proleter on 11 September, Richairo Živković made his debut for the club coming in as a half time substitution. Aleksandar Katai scored two goals in the same match which earned him the title of the player of the round. On 19 September first Eternal derby of the season was played in an away game against club's arch rivals Partizan. This was 165th time that those two teams clashed against each other in the league, and 203rd in total. Match ended in 1–1 draw, with only goal for the Red Star being scored by Aleksandar Katai. In the last match of the month Red Star won an away game against Novi Pazar 4–0.

Club started group stage of the Europa League with a 2–1 home game win against Portuguese side Braga. This was the fourth time these two sides played against each other, and the first time ever that Red Star managed to be victorious. Second group match was an away game against Bulgarian champions Ludogorets Razgrad on 30 September. Match ended with Red Star's 1–0 win. This was the third match between those two sides, and the first that Red Star was victorious.

=== October ===
During the October's international window Red Star had three first team players who received call-ups for Serbia national under-21 football team to play in the 2023 UEFA European Under-21 Championship qualification - goalkeeper Miloš Gordić who played both scheduled games and conceded four goals, defender Strahinja Eraković who played one game against Armenia and scored his first goal for Serbia under-21s and midfielder Petar Stanić who failed to make an appearance. Besides those three players Guélor Kanga played two games for the Gabon and Richard Odada played two games for Kenya in 2022 FIFA World Cup qualification.

Only one game was played in Europa League, an away match against Danish side Midtjylland on 21 October. Match ended in a 1-1 draw with only goal being scored by Mirko Ivanić who signed new contract with the club until 2025 just one day after this match. This was first time in history that these two teams played each other.

Besides Ivanić two more players extended their contracts with the club during the October, both products of club's youth academy. Defender Strahinja Eraković extended his contract until summer of 2025 and goalkeeper Miloš Gordić extended his contract until summer of 2023 with an option for another two-years extension.

In Serbian Superliga club played five matches, winning four and losing one game. On 16 October club achieved biggest win of the season 7–1 in an away game against Kolubara. For his performance in this match, in which he had 2 assists, Milan Rodić earned the Superliga's Player of the Week award. On 27 October a 2–1 loss was suffered in a match against Radnik Surdulica. This was first time that the club lost a league game since 2019–20 season, since when they had 51 games undefeated run in the league. This was also the third longest undefeated run in club's history. At the end of the month club was placed second on the league table with 8 points behind their rivals Partizan.

Club was scheduled to start this season of Serbian Cup in the round of 32 on 27 October, but that match was rescheduled to 18 November. Red Star was drawn to play an away game against Serbian First League side Inđija.

=== November ===
During the November's international window Red Star had six players who received call-ups for their national teams and three players who received call-ups for Serbia national under-21 football team. Milan Borjan played two games for Canada in CONCACAF 2022 FIFA World Cup qualification conceding one goal. Miloš Degenek played two games for Australia in AFC 2022 FIFA World Cup qualification. Aleksandar Dragović played two games for Austria in UEFA 2022 FIFA World Cup qualification. Aleksandar Dragović played two games for Austria in UEFA 2022 FIFA World Cup qualification who qualified for UEFA second round play-off. Guélor Kanga played one game for Gabon in CAF 2022 FIFA World Cup qualification who were eliminated by finishing second in their qualification group. Ben played one friendly game for Comoros in which he scored two goals. Richard Odada played one game and scored a goal for Kenya in CAF 2022 FIFA World Cup qualification who were eliminated from the qualifications by finishing third in their group. Finally Miloš Gordić, Strahinja Eraković and Petar Stanić received call-up for Serbia national under-21 football team for their 2023 European Under-21 Championship qualification. All three of them played two games for the national youth squad. Seven more players from the youth squad received call-up for Serbia national under-19 football team.

Club played two home games in Europa League. It lost against Midtjylland and defeated Ludogorets. With one game remaining in December Red Star secured European spring for two consecutive seasons and last group stage match in December (away game against Braga) will determine whether it will continue its run in Europe League or be transferred into 2021–22 UEFA Europa Conference League.

In Serbian Superleague only three games were played. Red Star won all three of them with outstanding performance from Aleksandar Katai who scored club's first hat-trick of the season in an away game against Mladost. For this accomplishment he was named Superliga's Player of the Week for the second time this season. Other notable performance was by Ben in a home game against Spartak in which he scored 2 goals and 1 assist also earning the title of the Superliga's Player of the Week. Club again ended the month in the second place, just 3 points shy of Partizan.

Rescheduled game of the first round of Serbian Cup against Inđija was played on 18 November. Red Star was victorious 1–0 with only goal being scored by Richairo Živković. That was his first goal for the club since his arrival this season. In the second round of the competition Red Star was drawn to play a home game against Radnički Niš. Game was originally scheduled to be played on 1 December, but was rescheduled to a later date.

=== December ===
Red Star played their final groups stage game in Europa League against Braga in Portugal. They held to a 1–1 draw with only goal being scored from the penalty by Aleksandar Katai. This draw secured them first position in a group and qualified them for the round of 16 of Europa League. This was the first time Red Star finished first in the group stage of Europa League, and the first time they managed to qualify for the round of 16 since the competition was rebranded in 2009.

In Serbian Superleague they played 4 games, winning 3 and drawing 1. They finished winter part of the season in the second place, five points behind Partizan.

On 27 December Gabonese midfielder Guélor Kanga acquired Serbian citizenship after living in the country for more than three years. Because of that he will no longer be considered as a foreign player in Serbian Superleague.

=== January ===
Two of the club's players will represent their nations in 2021 Africa Cup of Nations that will be held from 9 January to 6 February. Guélor Kanga will represent Gabon and Ben will represent Comoros. They will both play in Group C together with Morocco and Ghana. Kanga played four games for Gabon, all four as a starter, and in the end was eliminated in Round of 16 by Burkina Faso. Ben also started in four games for Comoros, scoring one goal in the process. They were eliminated in Round of 16 by the competition's hosts Cameroon.

Milan Borjan also received international callup for Canada in third Round of CONCACAF's 2022 FIFA World Cup qualifications. He played three games and had all three clean sheet.

Red Star started their winter training camp on 13 January. First part of it, between 13 and 20 January, was supposed to be held on Cyprus but was canceled. Instead of that entire training camp was held between 13 January and 3 February in Turkey during which four friendly games were played.

At the end of previous month contract expired with two players, Slavoljub Srnić and Aleksa Vukanović. Vukanović left the club as a free agent and Srnić signed new contract until summer of 2023.

On 10 January club terminated contract with Australian international Miloš Degenek ending his second spell with the club. He was with the club for two and a half years. During his two spells at the club he played 132 matches in all competitions and scored three goals winning three domestic leagues and one domestic cup in the process. Degenek signed with MLS side Columbus Crew.

On 12 January club extended contract with Ghanaian forward Ibrahim Mustapha until summer of 2025. Mustapha, who arrived at the club in January 2020, spent previous season and a half on loans at Zlatibor Čajetina and Radnički Sremska Mitrovica.

On 15 January club signed contract with Italian international right back Cristiano Piccini until summer of 2024. Piccini arrived as a free agent from Spanish side Valencia.

On 18 January club signed contract with Serbian wing-back Nikola Glišić until summer of 2024. Glišić arrived from a Serbian First League side IMT and will remain with them on a loan until the end of a 2021–22 season.

On 27 January club sold young forward Marko Lazetić to Italian powerhouse Milan for an estimated fee of €4 million. Lazetić, who is a product of a club's youth academy, spent previous two seasons at the club winning one double in the process.

On 29 January club sold Serbian defensive midfielder to Spanish side Granada for an estimated fee of €1.5 million. Petrović, who arrived at the club in August 2019 from Rad, played 87 matches for the club in all competitions and scored 3 goals.

=== February ===
On 2 February club announced the transfer of German-born Serbian youth international Nemanja Motika. He is a product of Bayern Munich youth academy and was playing for Bayern Munich II in German fourth tier competition Regionalliga Bayern. Estimated fee for this transfer was around €2.5 million and Motika signed with the club until the summer of 2026.

On 7 February club announced that three of the youth players, defender Andrej Đurić and midfielders Nikola Stanković and Andrija Radulović will be recalled from club's affiliate Grafičar and promoted to the first squad. On the same day Ghanaian midfielder Ibrahim Mustapha was loaned out to Serbian SuperLiga side FK Novi Pazar until the end of the season.

During the month club extended contracts with two of its youth players. Serbian goalkeeper Marko Ćopić, who was on loan at Grafičar Beograd since the start of the season, extended his contract with the club until summer of 2024. He will remain on loan at Grafičar until the end of the season. Serbian defender Stefan Leković signed his first professional contract with the club until summer of 2026. He will also be loaned to Grafičar Beograd until the end of this season.

On 24 February club extended contract with Serbian full back Milan Rodić until summer of 2025. Rodić arrived at the club in summer of 2017 from Russian side Krylia Sovetov and won four Serbian SuperLeagues and one Serbian Cup during his tenure at the club.

The draw for the UEFA Europa League round of 16 was held on 25 February 2022. Red Star was drawn against Scottish side Rangers. The first leg was played on 10 March, and the second leg was played on 17 March 2022. This was the fourth time in history that these two clubs were drawn to play against each other.

In Serbian SuperLeague they played 3 games, winning all three of them. Highlight of the month was a 2–0 Eternal derby win against their arch-rivals Partizan. They finished February in the second place, two points behind Partizan.

=== March ===
Draw for the quarter-finals of the Serbian Cup was held on 1 March. Red Star was drawn to play home game against TSC on 6 April.

Club played UEFA Europa League Round of 16 against Scottish side Rangers and lost 4–2 on aggregate. First leg in Glasgow was 3–0 defeat, while rematch in Belgrade ended in Red Star's 2–1 win. El Fardou Ben Nabouhane penalty winner from the second match was his 15th goal for the club in European competitions which brought him to the 5th place on the list of club's top scorers in international competitions. This ended one of the best European seasons for the club in last few decades after which club climbed to 34. place on UEFA team rankings - its best ranking since 1992.

In Serbian SuperLeague club played 4 games, and won all 4 of them, conceding only one goal. Highlights of the month were Aleksandar Katai's hattrick in a 5–0 win against Novi Pazar and Andrej Đurić debut for the club in a 3–0 win against Kolubara. Club finished the month in the first place, tied with Partizan.

During the international break eight of the club's first team players represented their national teams. Club's captain Milan Borjan made two caps for Canada in 2022 FIFA World Cup qualification and helped them qualify for the 2022 FIFA World Cup - their first world cup after 36 years. Aleksandar Dragović made two caps for Austria, who failed to qualify for the 2022 FIFA World Cup. With these two games he reached 100 caps for Austria, making him only second player in nation's history to do so. El Fardou Ben Nabouhane played one friendly game for Comoros. Miloš Gordić, Strahinja Eraković and Andrija Radulović received callups for Serbia U21 selection to play in 2023 UEFA European Under-21 Championship qualifications. Gordić had two caps and Eraković one. Lastly Nikola Stanković and Nemanja Motika were called up for Serbia U19 selection and both played in a single friendly game.

=== April ===
During the month in Serbian SuperLeague club played 5 games, winning 4 of them and drawing in third eternal derby against Partizan. They ended the month at the top of the table with 2 points ahead of Partizan and 4 games left to play.

In Serbian Cup quarter-final club eliminated TSC. For the semi-final Red Star was drawn to play another home game against Novi Pazar.

=== May ===
The club finished Serbian SuperLeague as a champions with a four wins during the May. This was the club's 8th title in Serbian SuperLeague and 33rd domestic league title.

In Serbian Cup the club played semi final against FK Novi Pazar and final against Partizan and won both games. This was 5th Serbian Cup and 26th domestic cup title for the club.

On 26 May manager Dejan Stanković extended his contract with the club until the summer of 2025.

== Players ==
Players and squad numbers last updated on 22 May 2022. Appearances include league matches only.
Note: Flags indicate national team as has been defined under FIFA eligibility rules. Players may hold more than one non-FIFA nationality.

No.	Name	Nat	Position(s)	Date of birth (age)	Signed in	Contract ends	Signed from	Transfer fees	Apps.	Goals	Notes
Goalkeepers
1	Zoran Popović	(Serbia)	GK	28 May 1988 (aged 33)	2018	2023	(Norway) Bodø/Glimt	€80k	25	0	
51	Miloš Gordić ^{U21}	(Serbia)	GK	5 March 2000 (aged 21)	2020	2023	(Serbia) Youth academy	N/A	3	0	
82	Milan Borjan	(Canada)	GK	23 October 1987 (aged 33)	2017	2023	(Bulgaria) Ludogorets Razgrad	Free transfer	147	1	Captain
Defenders
2	Milan Gajić	(Serbia)	RB	28 January 1996 (aged 25)	2019	2022	(France) Bordeaux	Free transfer	92	5	
6	Radovan Pankov	(Serbia)	CB	5 August 1995 (aged 25)	2019	2022	(Serbia) Radnički Niš	€300k	76	2	
14	Andrej Đurić ^{U21}	(Serbia)	CB	21 September 2003 (aged 17)	2021	2025	(Serbia) Youth academy	N/A	1	0	
15	Aleksandar Dragović	(Austria)	CB	6 March 1991 (aged 30)	2021	2024	(Germany) Bayer Leverkusen	Free transfer	34	4	
23	Milan Rodić	(Serbia)	LB	2 April 1991 (aged 30)	2017	2025	(Russia) Krylia Sovetov	€250k	126	8	
24	Cristiano Piccini ^{FGN}	(Italy)	RB	26 September 1992 (aged 28)	2022	2024	(Spain) Valencia	Free transfer	10	0	
25	Strahinja Eraković ^{U21}	(Serbia)	CB	21 January 2001 (aged 20)	2020	2025	(Serbia) Youth academy	N/A	46	0	3rd captain
77	Marko Gobeljić	(Serbia)	RB	13 September 1992 (aged 28)	2017	2022	(Serbia) Napredak Kruševac	€100k	101	8	
Midfielders
4	Mirko Ivanić	(Montenegro)	AM	13 September 1993 (aged 27)	2019	2025	(Belarus) BATE Borisov	€1.3m	102	36	
7	Nenad Krstičić	(Serbia)	DM	3 July 1990 (aged 30)	2021	2023	(Greece) AEK Athens	Free transfer	70	7	
8	Guélor Kanga	(Gabon)	AM	1 September 1990 (aged 30)	2020	2023	(Czech Republic) Sparta Prague	Free transfer	96	17	
10	Aleksandar Katai	(Serbia)	LW	6 February 1991 (aged 30)	2020	2024	(United States) LA Galaxy	Free transfer	111	63	Vice–captain
11	Filippo Falco ^{FGN}	(Italy)	RW	11 February 1992 (aged 29)	2021	2023	(Italy) Lecce	€1.2m	26	4	
17	Nemanja Motika ^{U21}	(Serbia)	LW	20 March 2003 (aged 18)	2022	2026	(Germany) Bayern Munich II	€2.5m	10	1	
21	Petar Stanić ^{U21}	(Serbia)	AM	14 August 2001 (aged 19)	2021	2025	(Serbia) Železničar Pančevo	€100k	13	0	
22	Veljko Nikolić	(Serbia)	AM	29 August 1999 (aged 21)	2019	2023	(Serbia) Youth academy	N/A	52	8	
35	Sékou Sanogo ^{FGN}	(Ivory Coast)	DM	5 May 1989 (aged 32)	2020	2023	(Saudi Arabia) Al-Ittihad	Free transfer	48	4	
38	Nikola Stanković ^{U21}	(Serbia)	CM	24 April 2003 (aged 18)	2021	2025	(Serbia) Youth academy	N/A	6	0	
49	Andrija Radulović ^{U21}	(Serbia)	RW	3 July 2002 (aged 18)	2020	2025	(Serbia) Youth academy	N/A	11	1	
55	Slavoljub Srnić	(Serbia)	RW	12 January 1992 (aged 29)	2020	2023	(Spain) Las Palmas	Free transfer	128	16	
93	Axel Bakayoko ^{FGN}	(France)	RW	6 January 1998 (aged 23)	2021	2022	(Italy) Inter Milan	Free transfer	5	0	
Forwards
9	Milan Pavkov	(Serbia)	CF	9 February 1994 (aged 27)	2017	2024	(Serbia) Radnički Niš	€300k	102	44	
30	Richairo Živković	(Netherlands)	RW	5 September 1996 (aged 24)	2021	2024	(China) Changchun Yatai	Free transfer	9	0	
31	Ben	(Comoros)	RW	10 June 1989 (aged 32)	2018	2023	(Greece) Olympiacos	€500k	121	63	
39	Loïs Diony ^{FGN}	(France)	CF	20 December 1992 (aged 28)	2021	2022	(France) Angers	Loan	8	1	
99	Ohi Omoijuanfo ^{FGN}	(Norway)	CF	10 January 1994 (aged 27)	2022	2024	(Norway) Molde	Free transfer	16	9	

- Note: SuperLiga imposes a requirements on under-21 players (marked as ^{U21}) and foreign players (marked as ^{FGN}). There must be at least one ^{U21} and no more than four ^{FGN} players on the pitch at any time.

== Pre-season and friendlies ==
Summer training camp in Austria

28 June 2021 Friendly	Red Star (Serbia)	4–0	(Austria) GAK	Stegersbach, Austria
18:30	Ivanić 14'; Katai 20' (pen.); Pankov 29'; Srnić 60'	Report

1 July 2021 Friendly	Red Star (Serbia)	2–1	(Greece) Aris	Stegersbach, Austria
18:00	Babić 59'; Kanga 81' (pen.)	Report	Bertoglio 78' (pen.)

5 July 2021 Friendly	Red Star (Serbia)	3–0	(Romania) Argeș Pitești	Stegersbach, Austria
17:30	Nikolić 14'; Krstović 30', 89'	Report

8 July 2021 Friendly	Red Star (Serbia)	1–1	(Austria) Sturm Graz	Stegersbach, Austria
20:30	Ben Nabouhane 11'		Kiteishvili 83' (pen.)

Winter training camp in Turkey

25 January 2022 Friendly	Red Star (Serbia)	1–1	(Slovenia) Maribor	Antalya, Turkey
16:00	Omoijuanfo 27'	Report	Mudrinski 19'	Stadium: Calista Sports Center

28 January 2022 Friendly	Red Star (Serbia)	2–1	(Austria) LASK	Antalya, Turkey
15:00	Omoijuanfo 32'; Katai 39'		Balić 17'	Stadium: Calista Sports Center

31 January 2022 Friendly	Red Star (Serbia)	2–3	(Ukraine) Shakhtar Donetsk	Antalya, Turkey
15:00	Dragović 58'; Omoijuanfo 68'	Report	Mudryk 13'; Neres 18', 72'	Stadium: Calista Sports Center

3 February 2022 Friendly	Red Star (Serbia)	Canceled	(Belarus) Shakhtyor Soligorsk	Antalya, Turkey
				Stadium: Calista Sports Center

3 February 2022 Friendly	Red Star (Serbia)	Abandoned	(Austria) Rheindorf Altach	Antalya, Turkey
				Stadium: Calista Sports Center

== Competitions ==
=== Overall record ===
Competition	Record							
Competition	P	W	D	L	GF	GA	GD	Win %
Serbian SuperLiga	37	32	4	1	95	19	+76	86.49
Serbian Cup	5	4	1	0	15	1	+14	80.00
UEFA Champions League	4	1	1	2	7	4	+3	25.00
UEFA Europa League	10	6	2	2	14	9	+5	60.00
Total	57	44	8	5	131	33	+98	77.19

=== Serbian SuperLiga ===
==== Season results summary ====
Overall								Home						Away					
Pld	W	D	L	GF	GA	GD	Pts	W	D	L	GF	GA	GD	W	D	L	GF	GA	GD
37	32	4	1	95	19	+76	100	16	3	0	42	6	+36	16	1	1	53	13	+40

==== Season results round by round ====
Round	1	2	3	4	5	6	7	8	9	10	11	12	13	14	15	16	17	18	19	20	21	22	23	24	25	26	27	28	29	30	31	32	33	34	35	36	37
Result	D	W	W	W	L	W	W	W	D	W	W	W	W	W	W	W	W	W	W	D	W	W	W	W	W	W	W	W	W	W	D	W	W	W	W	W	W
Position	8	5	3	3	3	3	3	2	2	2	2	2	2	2	2	2	2	2	2	2	2	2	2	2	2	2	2	2	1	1	1	1	1	1	1	1	1

W = Win; D = Draw; L = Loss; P = Postponed

==== Regular season league table ====
Pos	Team	Pld	W	D	L	GF	GA	GD	Pts	Qualification
1	Red Star Belgrade	30	26	3	1	79	17	+62	81	Qualification for the Championship round
2	Partizan	30	25	4	1	68	10	+58	79	Qualification for the Championship round
3	Čukarički	30	14	12	4	48	27	+21	54	Qualification for the Championship round
4	TSC	30	11	8	11	44	41	+3	41	Qualification for the Championship round
5	Radnički Niš	30	9	13	8	32	33	−1	40	Qualification for the Championship round

Source: SuperLiga (in Serbian)
Rules for classification: 1) Points; 2) Head-to-head points; 3) Head-to-head goal difference; 4) Head-to-head goals scored; 5) Head-to-head away goals scored (if two teams tied); 6) Goal difference; 7) Goals scored; 8) Fair play ranking; 9) Draw.

==== Regular season matches ====
16 July 2021 1	Red Star	0–0	Vojvodina	Rajko Mitić Stadium, Belgrade
20:00		Report		Attendance: 20,361; Referee: Lazar Lukić

24 July 2021 2	Red Star	1–0	Mladost	Rajko Mitić Stadium, Belgrade
21:00	Ivanić 45'	Report		Attendance: 12,427; Referee: Miloš Milanović

31 July 2021 3	Spartak	1–3	Red Star	Subotica City Stadium, Subotica
18:55	Pankov 26' (o.g.)	Report	Ivanić 5'; Ben 41'; Krstović 90'	Attendance: 2,000; Referee: Aleksandar Živković

6 August 2021 4	Red Star	1–0	Napredak	Rajko Mitić Stadium, Belgrade
20:00	Gajić 77'	Report		Attendance: 8,271; Referee: Nenad Minaković

21 August 2021 6	Red Star	3–1	TSC	Rajko Mitić Stadium, Belgrade
19:00	Krstičić 29'; Katai 51'; Ben 78'	Report	Zec 25'	Attendance: 8,294; Referee: Milan Mitić

29 August 2021 7	Čukarički	1–2	Red Star	Čukarički Stadium, Belgrade
18:55	Jovanović 89'	Report	Pavkov 40'; Katai 57'	Attendance: 2,000; Referee: Miloš Milanović

11 September 2021 8	Red Star	3–0	Proleter	Rajko Mitić Stadium, Belgrade
20:00	Sanogo 24'; Katai 28', 75'	Report		Attendance: 19,035; Referee: Momčilo Marković

19 September 2021 9	Partizan	1–1	Red Star	Partizan Stadium, Belgrade
18:00	Natkho 36'	Report	Katai 83'	Attendance: 16,074; Referee: Novak Simović

26 September 2021 11	Novi Pazar	0–4	Red Star	Novi Pazar City Stadium, Novi Pazar
15:55		Report	Dragović 3'; Katai 14'; Sanogo 20'; Diony 68' (pen.)	Attendance: 0 Referee: Lazar Lukić

3 October 2021 12	Red Star	3–1	Metalac	Rajko Mitić Stadium, Belgrade
20:00	Falco 10'; Ivanić 63'; Kanga 90' (pen.)	Report	Stuparević 40'	Attendance: 7,141; Referee: Aleksandar Živković

16 October 2021 13	Kolubara	1–7	Red Star	Kolubara Stadium, Kolubara
15:55	Mladenović 86'	Report	Dragović 8'; Ben 16'; Ivanić 18', 36'; Pavkov 24', 43'; Lazetić 88'	Referee: Srđan Jovanović

24 October 2021 14	Red Star	1–0	Radnički Niš	Rajko Mitić Stadium, Belgrade
18:45	Ben 53'	Report		Attendance: 6,381; Referee: Nikola Radaković

27 October 2021 5	Radnik	2–1	Red Star	Surdulica City Stadium, Surdulica
17:00	Spasić 14'; Lukić 54'	Report	Ben 57'	Attendance: 1,500; Referee: Novak Simović
Note: This match was originally scheduled to be played on 14 August, but was rescheduled to 27 October due to Red Star's European qualifications matches.

31 October 2021 15	Radnički 1923	0–3	Red Star	Čika Dača Stadium, Kragujevac
13:30		Report	Ivanić 18'; Pavkov 45'; Katai 49'	Attendance: 8,000; Referee: Milan Mitić

7 November 2021 16	Vojvodina	1–2	Red Star	Karađorđe Stadium, Novi Sad
16:45	Dragović 31' (o.g.)	Report	Pavkov 54'; Dragović 62'	Referee: Miloš Milanović

21 November 2021 17	Mladost	1–5	Red Star	Mladost Stadium, Lučani
13:30	Bojović 8'	Report	Katai 30', 54', 65'; Kanga 59'; Ivanić 61'	Referee: Nenad Minaković

28 November 2021 18	Red Star	3–0	Spartak	Rajko Mitić Stadium, Belgrade
14:25	Rodić 9'; Ben 46', 71'	Report		Attendance: 5,286; Referee: Marko Ivković

1 December 2021 10	Red Star	1–0	Voždovac	Rajko Mitić Stadium, Belgrade
18:30	Ivanić 11'	Report		Attendance: 7,016; Referee: Momčilo Marković
Note: This match was originally scheduled to be played on 23 September, but was rescheduled to a later date.

5 December 2021 19	Napredak	0–2	Red Star	Mladost Stadium, Kruševac
13:30		Report	Rodić 5'; Katai 43'	Attendance: 5,000; Referee: Novak Simović

13 December 2021 20	Red Star	1–1	Radnik	Rajko Mitić Stadium, Belgrade
18:00	Katai 36' (pen.)	Report	Stamenković 83'	Attendance: 4,286; Referee: Đorđe Maksimović

16 December 2021 21	TSC	2–3	Red Star	TSC Arena, Bačka Topola
16:05	Banjac 7'; Stanojlović 21'	Report	Ivanić 15'; Pavkov 32', 55'	Attendance: 4,000; Referee: Milan Stefanović

12 February 2022 22	Red Star	3–0	Čukarički	Rajko Mitić Stadium, Belgrade
17:00	Pavkov 16'; Omoijuanfo 74'; Dragović 79'	Report		Attendance: 18,638; Referee: Nenad Minaković

20 February 2022 23	Proleter	1–2	Red Star	Karađorđe Stadium, Novi Sad
13:00	Tomović 62'	Report	Ben 34'; Pavkov 87'	Referee: Aleksandar Živković

27 February 2022 24	Red Star	2–0	Partizan	Rajko Mitić Stadium, Belgrade
18:00	Omoijuanfo 30'; Katai 43'	Report		Attendance: 44,788; Referee: Srđan Jovanović

3 March 2022 25	Voždovac	0–3	Red Star	Voždovac Stadium, Belgrade
15:00		Report	Ivanić 35'; Katai 59'; Omoijuanfo 66'	Referee: Dejan Trifković

6 March 2022 26	Red Star	5–0	Novi Pazar	Rajko Mitić Stadium, Belgrade
16:15	Omoijuanfo 8'; Katai 15', 21', 56'; Ivanić 16'	Report		Attendance: 5,480; Referee: Pavle Tomić

14 March 2022 27	Metalac	1–2	Red Star	Stadion Metalac, Gornji Milanovac
15:55	Cvetković 32'	Report	Omoijuanfo 45'; Pavkov 56'	Attendance: 4,000; Referee: Novak Simović

20 March 2022 28	Red Star	3–0	Kolubara	Rajko Mitić Stadium, Belgrade
18:30	Ben 29'; Rodić 44'; Omoijuanfo 70'	Report		Attendance: 5,366; Referee: Momčilo Marković

2 April 2022 29	Radnički Niš	1–5	Red Star	Čair Stadium, Niš
16:15	Mitrović 33'	Report	Katai 25', 47', 61'; Ben 75'; Krstičić 86'	Attendance: 9,000; Referee: Milan Mitić

10 April 2022 30	Red Star	4–1	Radnički 1923	Rajko Mitić Stadium, Belgrade
17:00	Srnić 26'; Ben 52'; Ivanić 56'; Motika 78'	Report	Maksimović 86'	Attendance: 9,059; Referee: Danilo Nikolić

==== Championship round league table ====
Pos	Team	Pld	W	D	L	GF	GA	GD	Pts	Qualification
1	Red Star Belgrade (C)	37	32	4	1	95	19	+76	100	Qualification for the Champions League third qualifying round
2	Partizan	37	31	5	1	85	13	+72	98	Qualification to Europa League third qualifying round
3	Čukarički	37	15	15	7	54	34	+20	60	Qualification to Europa Conference League second qualifying round
4	Radnički Niš	37	12	15	10	40	39	+1	51	Qualification to Europa Conference League second qualifying round
5	Voždovac	37	13	10	14	48	45	+3	49	

Source: SuperLiga (in Serbian)
Rules for classification: 1) Points; 2) Points in regular season; 3) Head-to-head points in regular season; 4) Head-to-head goal difference in regular season; 5) Head-to-head goals scored in regular season; 6) Head-to-head away goals scored in regular season (if two teams tied); 7) Goal difference; 8) Goals scored; 9) Fair play ranking; 10) Drawing of lots.
(C) Champions

==== Championship round matches ====
16 April 2022 31	Red Star	0–0	Partizan	Rajko Mitić Stadium, Belgrade
18:00		Report		Attendance: 42,642; Referee: Srđan Jovanović

20 April 2022 32	TSC	0–4	Red Star	TSC Arena, Bačka Topola
16:00		Report	Ivanić 16', 64', 67'; Ben 72'	Referee: Miloš Milanović

27 April 2022 33	Red Star	1–0	Čukarički	Rajko Mitić Stadium, Belgrade
18:30	Ben 40'	Report		Attendance: 5,157; Referee: Momčilo Marković

1 May 2022 34	Vojvodina	0–3	Red Star	Karađorđe Stadium, Novi Sad
17:00		Report	Pavkov 2'; Katai 34', 70'	Referee: Dejan Trifković

7 May 2022 35	Red Star	4–1	Radnički Niš	Rajko Mitić Stadium, Belgrade
17:00	Katai 10' (pen.); Ivanić 13'; Omoijuanfo 22', 56'	Report	Mitrović 53'	Attendance: 8,149; Referee: Milan Stefanović

15 May 2022 36	Napredak	0–1	Red Star	Mladost Stadium, Kruševac
18:30		Report	Omoijuanfo 33'	Attendance: 8,000; Referee: Marko Ivković

22 May 2022 37	Red Star	3–1	Voždovac	Rajko Mitić Stadium, Belgrade
18:30	Katai 40'; Ivanić 54'; Borjan 90' (pen.)	Report	Milojević 67'	Attendance: 41,300; Referee: Dejan Trifković

=== Serbian Cup ===
==== First round ====
18 November 2021 R1	Inđija	0–1	Red Star	Inđija Stadium, Inđija
13:00		Report	Živković 24'	Attendance: 1,500; Referee: Marko Ivković
Note: This match was originally scheduled to be played on 27 October, but was rescheduled to 18 November.

==== Round of 16 ====
16 February 2022 R16	Red Star	0–0 (3–2 p)	Radnički Niš	Rajko Mitić Stadium, Belgrade
17:00		Report		Attendance: 5,421; Referee: Marko Srećković
	Penalties
	Katai (penalty scored); Rodić (penalty missed); Ivanić (penalty scored); Pankov (penalty missed); Pavkov (penalty missed); Kanga (penalty scored)		Vujadinović (penalty missed); Mlađović (penalty missed); Arsić (penalty scored); Živojinović (penalty missed); Štulić (penalty scored); Mitrović (penalty missed)

==== Quarter-finals ====
6 April 2022 QF	Red Star	4–0	TSC	Rajko Mitić Stadium, Belgrade
18:30	Katai 6' (pen.); Ben 56' (pen.), 80'; Ivanić 74'	Report		Referee: Lazar Lukić

==== Semi-finals ====
11 May 2022 SF	Red Star	8–0	Novi Pazar	Rajko Mitić Stadium, Belgrade
18:30	Ben 6'; Omoijuanfo 12' (pen.), 20'; Pavkov 15'; Ivanić 23'; Stanković 58' (pen.), 89'; Stanić 81'	Report		Attendance: 5,794; Referee: Miloš Milanović

==== Final ====
26 May 2022 F	Red Star	2–1	Partizan	Rajko Mitić Stadium, Belgrade
16:30	Katai 26', 73'	Report	Urošević 62'	Attendance: 30,505; Referee: Miloš Milanović

=== UEFA Champions League ===
==== Second qualifying round ====
21 July 2021 First leg	Kairat (Kazakhstan)	2–1	(Serbia) Red Star	Almaty Central Stadium, Almaty
16:00	Kanté 24'; Bagnack 79'	Report	Mikanović 57' (o.g.)	Attendance: 7,000; Referee: Halil Umut Meler (Turkey)

28 July 2021 Second leg	Red Star (Serbia)	5–0 (6–2 agg.)	(Kazakhstan) Kairat	Rajko Mitić Stadium, Belgrade
20:30	Katai 9', 42'; Diony 21'; Ivanić 49'; Falco 56'	Report		Attendance: 21,890 (only 14 yo or less); Referee: Andris Treimanis (Latvia)

==== Third qualifying round ====
3 August 2021 First leg	Red Star (Serbia)	1–1	(Moldova) Sheriff Tiraspol	Rajko Mitić Stadium, Belgrade
21:00	Diony 45+1'	Report	Castañeda 33'	Attendance: 27,433; Referee: Ovidiu Haţegan (Romania)

10 August 2021 Second leg	Sheriff Tiraspol (Moldova)	1–0 (2–1 agg.)	(Serbia) Red Star	Sheriff Stadium, Tiraspol
19:00	Arboleda 45+2'	Report		Attendance: 4,950; Referee: Felix Zwayer (Germany)

=== UEFA Europa League ===
==== Play-off round ====
17 August 2021 First leg	Red Star (Serbia)	4–0	(Romania) CFR Cluj	Rajko Mitić Stadium, Belgrade
21:00	Pavkov 5'; Katai 38'; Ben 68'; Ivanić 77'	Report		Attendance: 22,482; Referee: Georgi Kabakov (Bulgaria)

26 August 2021 Second leg	CFR Cluj (Romania)	1–2 (1–6 agg.)	(Serbia) Red Star	Dr. Constantin Rădulescu, Cluj-Napoca
20:30	Debeljuh 34'	Report	Katai 5' (pen.); Pavkov 53'	Attendance: 4,200; Referee: Michael Oliver (England)

==== Group stage ====
Pos	Team	Pld	W	D	L	GF	GA	GD	Pts	Qualification	RSB	BRA	MID	LUD
1	(Serbia) Red Star Belgrade	6	3	2	1	6	4	+2	11	Advance to round of 16	—	2–1	0–1	1–0
2	(Portugal) Braga	6	3	1	2	12	9	+3	10	Advance to knockout round play-offs	1–1	—	3–1	4–2
3	(Denmark) Midtjylland	6	2	3	1	7	7	0	9	Transfer to Europa Conference League	1–1	3–2	—	1–1
4	(Bulgaria) Ludogorets Razgrad	6	0	2	4	3	8	−5	2		0–1	0–1	0–0	—

Source: UEFA
Rules for classification: Group stage tiebreakers

16 September 2021 MD1	Red Star (Serbia)	2–1	(Portugal) Braga	Rajko Mitić Stadium, Belgrade
18:45	Rodić 75'; Katai 85' (pen.)	Report	Galeno 76'	Attendance: 24,671; Referee: John Beaton (Scotland)

30 September 2021 MD2	Ludogorets Razgrad (Bulgaria)	0–1	(Serbia) Red Star	Huvepharma Arena, Razgrad
21:00		Report	Kanga 64'	Attendance: 3,078; Referee: Jérôme Brisard (France)

21 October 2021 MD3	Midtjylland (Denmark)	1–1	(Serbia) Red Star	MCH Arena, Herning
18:45	Dyhr 78'	Report	Ivanić 58'	Referee: Roi Reinshreiber (Israel)

4 November 2021 MD4	Red Star (Serbia)	0–1	(Denmark) Midtjylland	Rajko Mitić Stadium, Belgrade
21:00		Report	Kanga 56' (o.g.)	Attendance: 20,000; Referee: Tamás Bognár (Hungary)

25 November 2021 MD5	Red Star (Serbia)	1–0	(Bulgaria) Ludogorets Razgrad	Rajko Mitić Stadium, Belgrade
18:45	Ivanić 57'	Report		Attendance: 11,252; Referee: José María Sánchez Martínez (Spain)

9 December 2021 MD6	Braga (Portugal)	1–1	(Serbia) Red Star	Estádio Municipal de Braga, Braga
21:00	Galeno 52' (pen.)	Report	Katai 70' (pen.)	Attendance: 5,344; Referee: Marco Guida (Italy)

==== Round of 16 ====
The draw for the round of 16 was held on 25 February 2022, 13:00 CET. The first legs was played on 10 March, and the second legs was played on 17 March 2022.

10 March 2022 First leg	Rangers (Scotland)	3–0	(Serbia) Red Star	Ibrox Stadium, Glasgow
21:00	Tavernier 11' (pen.); Morelos 15'; Balogun 51'	Report		Attendance: 48,589; Referee: Serdar Gözübüyük (Netherlands)

17 March 2022 Second leg	Red Star (Serbia)	2–1 (2–4 agg.)	(Scotland) Rangers	Rajko Mitić Stadium, Belgrade
18:45	Ivanić 10'; Nabouhane 90+3' (pen.)	Report	Kent 56'	Attendance: 47,024; Referee: István Kovács (Romania)

== Squad ==
=== Squad statistics ===
No.	Pos	Nat	Player	Total		SuperLiga		Cup		Champions League		Europa League	
No.	Pos	Nat	Player	Apps	Goals	Apps	Goals	Apps	Goals	Apps	Goals	Apps	Goals
Goalkeepers
1	GK	(Serbia) SRB	Zoran Popović	6	0	4	0	1	0	0	0	1	0
51	GK	(Serbia) SRB	Miloš Gordić	3	0	3	0	0	0	0	0	0	0
82	GK	(Canada) CAN	Milan Borjan	47	1	30	1	4	0	4	0	9	0
Defenders
2	DF	(Serbia) SRB	Milan Gajić	43	1	31	1	4	0	3	0	5	0
6	DF	(Serbia) SRB	Radovan Pankov	36	0	21	0	4	0	3	0	8	0
14	DF	(Serbia) SRB	Andrej Đurić	1	0	1	0	0	0	0	0	0	0
15	DF	(Austria) AUT	Aleksandar Dragović	52	4	34	4	5	0	4	0	9	0
23	DF	(Serbia) SRB	Milan Rodić	51	4	33	3	5	0	4	0	9	1
24	DF	(Italy) ITA	Cristiano Piccini	14	0	10	0	2	0	0	0	2	0
25	DF	(Serbia) SRB	Strahinja Eraković	41	0	33	0	2	0	0	0	6	0
77	DF	(Serbia) SRB	Marko Gobeljić	22	0	10	0	3	0	2	0	7	0
Midfielders
4	MF	(Montenegro) MNE	Mirko Ivanić	55	24	36	17	5	2	4	1	10	4
7	MF	(Serbia) SRB	Nenad Krstičić	44	2	30	2	3	0	4	0	7	0
8	MF	(Gabon) GAB	Guélor Kanga	48	3	31	2	4	0	3	0	10	1
10	MF	(Serbia) SRB	Aleksandar Katai	47	33	31	24	4	3	4	2	8	4
11	MF	(Italy) ITA	Filippo Falco	26	2	19	1	1	0	4	1	2	0
17	MF	(Serbia) SRB	Nemanja Motika	14	1	10	1	2	0	0	0	2	0
21	MF	(Serbia) SRB	Petar Stanić	16	1	13	0	2	1	0	0	1	0
22	MF	(Serbia) SRB	Veljko Nikolić	8	0	6	0	0	0	1	0	1	0
35	MF	(Ivory Coast) CIV	Sékou Sanogo	39	2	24	2	2	0	4	0	9	0
38	MF	(Serbia) SRB	Nikola Stanković	7	2	6	0	1	2	0	0	0	0
49	MF	(Serbia) SRB	Andrija Radulović	3	0	2	0	1	0	0	0	0	0
55	MF	(Serbia) SRB	Slavoljub Srnić	37	1	24	1	5	0	1	0	7	0
93	MF	(France) FRA	Axel Bakayoko	4	0	3	0	0	0	1	0	0	0
Forwards
9	FW	(Serbia) SRB	Milan Pavkov	43	14	29	11	5	1	1	0	8	2
30	FW	(Netherlands) NED	Richairo Živković	14	1	9	0	1	1	0	0	4	0
31	FW	(Comoros) COM	Ben	52	18	33	13	5	3	4	0	10	2
39	FW	(France) FRA	Loïs Diony	17	3	8	1	0	0	4	2	5	0
99	FW	(Norway) NOR	Ohi Omoijuanfo	22	11	16	9	4	2	0	0	2	0
Players transferred out during the season
3	DF	(Serbia) SRB	Srđan Babić	3	0	3	0	0	0	0	0	0	0
5	DF	(Australia) AUS	Miloš Degenek	15	0	7	0	1	0	1	0	6	0
18	MF	(Serbia) SRB	Njegoš Petrović	15	0	12	0	1	0	0	0	2	0
24	MF	(Serbia) SRB	Željko Gavrić	2	0	1	0	0	0	1	0	0	0
28	FW	(Serbia) SRB	Marko Lazetić	16	1	14	1	0	0	1	0	1	0
92	FW	(Serbia) SRB	Aleksa Vukanović	5	0	4	0	1	0	0	0	0	0
99	FW	(Montenegro) MNE	Nikola Krstović	8	1	4	1	0	0	3	0	1	0

Last updated: 26 May 2022
Source: Competitions

=== Goalscorers ===
Includes all competitive matches. The list is sorted by shirt number when total goals are equal.

As of 26 May 2022

Rank	Pos	No.	Player	League	Cup	Champions League	Europe League	Total
1	MF	10	(Serbia) Aleksandar Katai	24	3	2	4	33
2	MF	4	(Montenegro) Mirko Ivanić	17	2	1	4	24
3	FW	31	(Comoros) Ben	13	3	0	2	18
4	FW	9	(Serbia) Milan Pavkov	11	1	0	2	14
5	FW	99	(Norway) Ohi Omoijuanfo	9	2	0	0	11
6	DF	15	(Austria) Aleksandar Dragović	4	0	0	0	4
6	DF	23	(Serbia) Milan Rodić	3	0	0	1	4
8	MF	8	(Gabon) Guélor Kanga	2	0	0	1	3
8	FW	39	(France) Loïs Diony	1	0	2	0	3
10	MF	7	(Serbia) Nenad Krstičić	2	0	0	0	2
10	MF	11	(Italy) Filippo Falco	1	0	1	0	2
10	MF	35	(Ivory Coast) Sékou Sanogo	2	0	0	0	2
10	MF	38	(Serbia) Nikola Stanković	0	2	0	0	2
14	DF	2	(Serbia) Milan Gajić	1	0	0	0	1
14	MF	17	(Serbia) Nemanja Motika	1	0	0	0	1
14	MF	21	(Serbia) Petar Stanić	0	1	0	0	1
14	FW	28	(Serbia) Marko Lazetić	1	0	0	0	1
14	FW	30	(Netherlands) Richairo Živković	0	1	0	0	1
14	MF	55	(Serbia) Slavoljub Srnić	1	0	0	0	1
14	GK	82	(Canada) Milan Borjan	1	0	0	0	1
14	FW	99	(Montenegro) Nikola Krstović	1	0	0	0	1
Own goals				0	0	1	0	1
TOTALS				95	15	7	14	131

=== Clean sheets ===
Includes all competitive matches. The list is sorted by shirt number when total clean sheets are equal.

As of 26 May 2022

Rank	No.	Player	League	Cup	Champions League	Europe League	Total
1	82	(Canada) Milan Borjan	18	3	1	2	24
2	1	(Serbia) Zoran Popović	1	1	0	1	3
3	51	(Serbia) Miloš Gordić	1	0	0	0	1
TOTALS			20	4	1	3	28

=== Disciplinary record ===
As of 26 May 2022

Rank	No.	Pos	Player	League			Cup			Champions League			Europa League			Total		
Rank	No.	Pos	Player	Yellow card	(yellow card) (yellow-red card)	Red card	Yellow card	(yellow card) (yellow-red card)	Red card	Yellow card	(yellow card) (yellow-red card)	Red card	Yellow card	(yellow card) (yellow-red card)	Red card	Yellow card	(yellow card) (yellow-red card)	Red card
1	8	MF	(Gabon) Guélor Kanga	5	0	0	1	0	0	0	1	0	2	0	0	8	1	0
2	5	DF	(Australia) Miloš Degenek	2	0	0	0	0	0	0	0	0	2	0	1	4	0	1
3	77	DF	(Serbia) Marko Gobeljić	0	0	0	0	0	0	1	0	0	0	1	0	1	1	0
4	23	DF	(Serbia) Milan Rodić	9	0	0	1	0	0	1	0	0	3	0	0	14	0	0
5	7	MF	(Serbia) Nenad Krstičić	7	0	0	1	0	0	1	0	0	2	0	0	11	0	0
6	10	MF	(Serbia) Aleksandar Katai	3	0	0	2	0	0	1	0	0	4	0	0	10	0	0
6	35	MF	(Ivory Coast) Sékou Sanogo	5	0	0	1	0	0	2	0	0	2	0	0	10	0	0
8	9	FW	(Serbia) Milan Pavkov	4	0	0	1	0	0	0	0	0	3	0	0	8	0	0
9	25	DF	(Serbia) Strahinja Eraković	5	0	0	0	0	0	0	0	0	2	0	0	7	0	0
10	55	MF	(Serbia) Slavoljub Srnić	3	0	0	0	0	0	1	0	0	2	0	0	6	0	0
11	2	DF	(Serbia) Milan Gajić	3	0	0	1	0	0	0	0	0	1	0	0	5	0	0
11	15	DF	(Austria) Aleksandar Dragović	1	0	0	1	0	0	0	0	0	3	0	0	5	0	0
11	31	FW	(Comoros) Ben	3	0	0	0	0	0	0	0	0	2	0	0	5	0	0
11	82	GK	(Canada) Milan Borjan	2	0	0	1	0	0	1	0	0	1	0	0	5	0	0
15	4	MF	(Montenegro) Mirko Ivanić	1	0	0	0	0	0	1	0	0	2	0	0	4	0	0
15	28	FW	(Serbia) Marko Lazetić	3	0	0	0	0	0	1	0	0	0	0	0	4	0	0
17	6	DF	(Serbia) Radovan Pankov	2	0	0	0	0	0	0	0	0	0	0	0	2	0	0
17	11	MF	(Italy) Filippo Falco	2	0	0	0	0	0	0	0	0	0	0	0	2	0	0
17	24	DF	(Italy) Cristiano Piccini	2	0	0	0	0	0	0	0	0	0	0	0	2	0	0
17	38	FW	(France) Loïs Diony	1	0	0	0	0	0	0	0	0	1	0	0	2	0	0
21	3	DF	(Serbia) Srđan Babić	1	0	0	0	0	0	0	0	0	0	0	0	1	0	0
21	21	MF	(Serbia) Petar Stanić	0	0	0	0	0	0	0	0	0	1	0	0	1	0	0
21	24	MF	(Serbia) Željko Gavrić	0	0	0	0	0	0	1	0	0	0	0	0	1	0	0
21	30	FW	(Netherlands) Richairo Živković	1	0	0	0	0	0	0	0	0	0	0	0	1	0	0
TOTALS				65	0	0	10	0	0	11	1	0	33	1	1	119	2	1

== Transfers ==
=== In ===
#	Pos.	Player	Transferred from	Date	Fee
Summer
15	DF	(Austria) Aleksandar Dragović	(Germany) Bayer 04 Leverkusen	26 May 2021	Free
7	MF	(Serbia) Nenad Krstičić	(Greece) AEK Athens	1 July 2021	Free
21	MF	(Serbia) Petar Stanić	(Serbia) Železničar Pančevo	1 July 2021	Undisclosed (~ €100,000)
	DF	(Serbia) Milan Ilić	(Serbia) Loznica	5 July 2021	Free
39	FW	(France) Loïs Diony	(France) Angers SCO	5 July 2021	Loan
30	FW	(Netherlands) Richairo Živković	(China) Changchun Yatai	30 August 2021	Free
Winter
99	FW	(Norway) Ohi Omoijuanfo	(Norway) Molde	1 January 2022	Free
24	DF	(Italy) Cristiano Piccini	(Spain) Valencia	15 January 2022	Free
	MF	(Serbia) Nikola Glišić	(Serbia) IMT	18 January 2022	Undisclosed
	MF	(Serbia) Nikola Motika	(Germany) Bayern Munich Junior	31 January 2022	Free (Note: To youth squad.)
	FW	(Bosnia and Herzegovina) Danilo Teodorović	(Bosnia and Herzegovina) Željezničar Banja Luka	31 January 2022	Free
17	MF	(Serbia) Nemanja Motika	(Germany) Bayern Munich II	2 February 2022	Undisclosed (~ €2,500,000)

=== Out ===
#	Pos.	Player	Transferred to	Date	Fee
Summer
19	DF	(Serbia) Nemanja Milunović	(Turkey) Alanyaspor	5 June 2021	Free
	GK	(Serbia) Miloš Čupić	(Serbia) Inđija	18 June 2021	Free (Note: Was loaned to Zlatibor in the 2020–21 season.)
	DF	(Serbia) Nemanja Stojić	(Serbia) Metalac	20 June 2021	Free (Note: Was loaned to Zlatibor and Grafičar in the 2020–21 season.)
30	DF	(Serbia) Uroš Blagojević	(Serbia) Radnički 1923	21 June 2021	Free (Note: Was loaned to Grafičar and Novi Pazar in the 2020–21 season.)
40	FW	(Serbia) Borisav Burmaz	(Serbia) Radnički 1923	21 June 2021	Free (Note: Was loaned to Grafičar in the 2020–21 season.)
44	DF	(Serbia) Vukašin Krstić	(Serbia) TSC	22 June 2021	Free (Note: Played for the youth squad in the 2020–21 season.)
16	FW	(Italy) Diego Falcinelli	(Italy) Bologna	30 June 2021	Loan return
30	MF	(Serbia) Miloš Pantović	(Serbia) Voždovac	7 July 2021	Free (Note: Was loaned to Voždovac in the 2020–21 season.)
32	GK	(Serbia) Aleksandar Stanković	(Bosnia and Herzegovina) Zrinjski	8 July 2021	Free
33	DF	(Serbia) Marko Konatar	(Serbia) Železničar Pančevo	8 July 2021	Free (Note: Was loaned to Inđija and Železničar Pančevo in the 2020–21 season.)
36	MF	(Slovakia) Erik Jirka	(Spain) Real Oviedo	19 July 2021	Undisclosed (~ €500,000) (Note: Was loaned to Mirandés in the 2020–21 season.)
	GK	(Serbia) Veljko Ilić	(Serbia) TSC	21 July 2021	Free
	DF	(Serbia) Milomir Čvorić	(Serbia) Mačva Šabac	9 August 2021	Free
	MF	(The Gambia) Ousman Marong	(North Macedonia) Akademija Pandev	10 August 2021	Undisclosed (Note: Was loaned to Hapoel Ra'anana and Grafičar in the 2020–21 season.)
24	MF	(Serbia) Željko Gavrić	(Hungary) Ferencvárosi	12 August 2021	Undisclosed (~ €1,200,000)
	FW	(Slovenia) Vanja Panić	(Slovenia) Dekani	25 August 2021	Free (Note: Was loaned to Grafičar and Mačva Šabac in the 2020–21 season.)
99	FW	(Montenegro) Nikola Krstović	(Slovakia) DAC 1904	4 September 2021	Undisclosed (~ €400,000)
Winter
92	FW	(Serbia) Aleksa Vukanović	(China) Meizhou Hakka	1 January 2022	Free
	DF	(Serbia) Matija Gluščević	(Serbia) Proleter Novi Sad	9 January 2022	Free (Note: Was loaned to Grafičar in the first half of the season.)
5	DF	(Australia) Miloš Degenek	(United States) Columbus Crew	10 January 2022	Free
28	FW	(Serbia) Marko Lazetić	(Italy) Milan	27 January 2022	Undisclosed (~ €4,000,000)
18	MF	(Serbia) Njegoš Petrović	(Spain) Granada	29 January 2022	Undisclosed (~ €1,500,000)
	MF	(Serbia) Martin Novaković	(Serbia) Voždovac	3 February 2022	Undisclosed (Note: Was loaned to IMT in the first half of the season.)

=== Loan returns and promotions ===
#	Pos	Player	Returned from	Date
Summer
3	DF	(Serbia) Srđan Babić	(Portugal) Famalicão	23 June 2021
28	FW	(Serbia) Marko Lazetić	(Serbia) Grafičar	24 June 2021
51	GK	(Serbia) Miloš Gordić	(Serbia) Mačva Šabac	24 June 2021
Winter
14	DF	(Serbia) Andrej Đurić	(Serbia) Grafičar	7 February 2022
38	MF	(Serbia) Nikola Stanković	(Serbia) Grafičar	7 February 2022
49	MF	(Serbia) Andrija Radulović	(Serbia) Grafičar	7 February 2022

=== Loan out ===
#	Pos	Player	Loaned to	Date
Summer
3	MF	(Kenya) Richard Odada	(Serbia) Metalac	20 June 2021
27	GK	(Serbia) Nikola Vasiljević	(Serbia) Napredak	26 June 2021 (Note: Was loaned to Proleter Novi Sad in the 2020–21 season.)
21	MF	(Serbia) Nikola Mituljikić	(Serbia) Grafičar Beograd	29 June 2021
29	MF	(Serbia) Mateja Bačanin	(Serbia) Grafičar Beograd	29 June 2021
40	DF	(Serbia) Andrej Đurić	(Serbia) Grafičar Beograd	29 June 2021 (Note: Loan extension.)
93	FW	(Serbia) Ilija Babić	(Serbia) Grafičar Beograd	29 June 2021
	GK	(Serbia) Ivan Guteša	(Serbia) Grafičar Beograd	29 June 2021
	DF	(Serbia) Uroš Lazić	(Serbia) Grafičar Beograd	29 June 2021
	DF	(Serbia) Stefan Despotovski	(Serbia) Grafičar Beograd	29 June 2021
	DF	(Serbia) David Petrović	(Serbia) Grafičar Beograd	29 June 2021
	DF	(Serbia) Matija Gluščević	(Serbia) Grafičar Beograd	29 June 2021
	MF	(Serbia) Filip Vasiljević	(Serbia) Grafičar Beograd	29 June 2021
	MF	(Serbia) Nikola Knežević	(Serbia) Grafičar Beograd	29 June 2021
	MF	(Serbia) Jovan Mituljikić	(Serbia) Grafičar Beograd	29 June 2021
32	GK	(Serbia) Marko Ćopić	(Serbia) Grafičar Beograd	13 July 2021
34	MF	(Serbia) Aleksa Matić	(Serbia) Grafičar Beograd	13 July 2021
	FW	(Serbia) Luka Marković	(Serbia) Grafičar Beograd	13 July 2021 (Note: Was loaned to Novi Pazar and Mačva Šabac in the 2020–21 season.)
	FW	(Serbia) Dejan Vidić	(Serbia) Grafičar Beograd	13 July 2021
49	MF	(Serbia) Andrija Radulović	(Serbia) Grafičar Beograd	14 July 2021
36	DF	(Serbia) Aleksandar Lukić	(Serbia) IMT	6 August 2021 (Note: Was loaned to Grafičar in the 2020–21 season.)
51	GK	(Serbia) Andrija Katić	(Serbia) IMT	6 August 2021
	DF	(Serbia) Milan Ilić	(Serbia) Loznica	6 August 2021
	MF	(Serbia) Vladimir Lučić	(Serbia) IMT	6 August 2021
	MF	(Ghana) Ibrahim Mustapha	(Serbia) Radnički Sremska Mitrovica	6 August 2021
70	MF	(Austria) Srđan Spiridonović	(Greece) Atromitos	7 August 2021 (Note: Was loaned to Gençlerbirliği in the 2020–21 season.)
3	DF	(Serbia) Srđan Babić	(Spain) Almería	30 August 2021 (Note: Was loaned to Famalicão in the 2020–21 season.)
38	MF	(Serbia) Nikola Stanković	(Serbia) Grafičar Beograd	12 September 2021
	MF	(Serbia) Martin Novaković	(Serbia) IMT	17 September 2021
	FW	(Serbia) Luka Marković	(Serbia) OFK Bačka	17 September 2021 (Note: Was loaned to Grafičar during the first part of the season.)
Winter
	DF	(Serbia) Milan Ilić	(Serbia) Grafičar Beograd	1 January 2022 (Note: Was loaned to Loznica during the first part of the season.)
	MF	(Serbia) Nikola Glišić	(Serbia) IMT	18 January 2022
17	MF	(Ghana) Ibrahim Mustapha	(Serbia) Novi Pazar	7 February 2022
	DF	(Serbia) Stefan Leković	(Serbia) Grafičar Beograd	10 February 2022

== See also ==
- 2021–22 KK Crvena zvezda season
