= 2020–21 Red Star Belgrade season =

Red Star Belgrade
2020–21 season
- President: Svetozar Mijailović
- Manager: Dejan Stanković
- Stadium: Rajko Mitić Stadium
- Serbian SuperLiga: 1st
- Serbian Cup: Winners
- UEFA Champions League: Third qualifying round
- UEFA Europa League: Round of 32
- Top goalscorer: League: Mirko Ivanić (16); All: Mirko Ivanić (20)
Home colours	Away colours	Third colours

The 2020–21 Red Star Belgrade season was the club's 15th in the Serbian SuperLiga and 75th consecutive season in the top flight of Yugoslav and Serbian football. The club participated in the Serbian SuperLiga and Serbian Cup winning them both, and took part in the UEFA Champions League and the UEFA Europa League.

== Pre-season and friendlies ==
16 July 2020 Friendly	Red Star (Serbia)	2–0	(Serbia) IMT	Lajkovac, Serbia
18:00	Ivanić 51'; Radulović 85'	Report		Stadium: Stadion Lajkovac; Referee: Marko Ivković

20 July 2020 Friendly	Metalac (Serbia)	0–1	(Serbia) Red Star	Gornji Milanovac, Serbia
19:00		Report	Krstović 89'	Stadium: Stadion Metalac; Referee: Miroslav Miletić

25 July 2020 Friendly	Red Star (Serbia)	2–1	(Serbia) Napredak Kruševac	Belgrade, Serbia
19:00	Ivanić 19'; Spiridonović 24'	Report	Šarac 89'	Stadium: Stadion Rajko Mitić; Referee: Igor Kovačević

28 July 2020 Friendly	Red Star (Serbia)	3–0	(Bosnia and Herzegovina) Borac Banja Luka	Belgrade, Serbia
19:00	Spiridonović 15'; Nikolić 54'; Radulović 89'	Report		Stadium: Stadion Rajko Mitić; Referee: Jovan Šegrt

22 January 2021 Friendly	Red Star (Serbia)	4–0	(Poland) Śląsk Wrocław	Belek, Turkey
15:00	Ivanić 34'; Falcinelli 44', 58'; Pavkov 73'	Report		Stadium: Susesi Sport Center

25 January 2021 Friendly	Red Star (Serbia)	1–0	(Russia) Ufa	Belek, Turkey
15:00	Milunović 15'	Report		Stadium: Susesi Sport Center

28 January 2021 Friendly	Red Star (Serbia)	5–0	(North Macedonia) Akademija Pandev	Belek, Turkey
15:00	Pavkov 40'; Nikolić 54'; Ivanić 71'; Falcinelli 84', 88'	Report		Stadium: Susesi Sport Center

31 January 2021 Friendly	Red Star (Serbia)	0–0	(Ukraine) Shakhtar	Belek, Turkey
15:00		Report		Stadium: Susesi Sport Center

== Competitions ==
=== Overview ===
Competition	Record							
Competition	P	W	D	L	GF	GA	GD	Win %
Serbian SuperLiga	38	35	3	0	114	20	+94	92.11
Serbian Cup	5	4	1	0	11	4	+7	80.00
UEFA Champions League	3	2	1	0	7	1	+6	66.67
UEFA Europa League	9	4	4	1	14	8	+6	44.44
Total	55	45	9	1	146	33	+113	81.82

=== Serbian SuperLiga ===
==== Season results summary ====
Overall								Home						Away					
Pld	W	D	L	GF	GA	GD	Pts	W	D	L	GF	GA	GD	W	D	L	GF	GA	GD
38	35	3	0	114	20	+94	108	18	1	0	60	8	+52	17	2	0	54	12	+42

==== League table ====
Pos	Team	Pld	W	D	L	GF	GA	GD	Pts	Qualification or relegation
1	Red Star Belgrade (C)	38	35	3	0	114	20	+94	108	Qualification for the Champions League second qualifying round
2	Partizan	38	31	2	5	95	20	+75	95	Qualification to Europa Conference League second qualifying round
3	Čukarički	38	22	8	8	69	34	+35	74	Qualification to Europa Conference League second qualifying round
4	Vojvodina	38	21	8	9	62	41	+21	71	Qualification to Europa Conference League second qualifying round
5	TSC	38	17	7	14	68	50	+18	58	

Source: SuperLiga (in Serbian), Soccerway
Rules for classification: 1) Points; 2) Head-to-head points; 3) Head-to-head goal difference; 4) Head-to-head goals scored; 5) Head-to-head away goals scored (if two teams tied); 6) Goal difference; 7) Goals scored; 8) Fair play ranking; 9) Draw.
(C) Champions

==== Result round by round ====
Round	1	2	3	4	5	6	7	8	9	10	11	12	13	14	15	16	17	18	19	20	21	22	23	24	25	26	27	28	29	30	31	32	33	34	35	36	37	38
Result	W	W	W	W	W	W	W	W	W	W	D	D	W	W	W	W	W	W	W	W	W	W	W	W	W	W	W	W	W	W	W	W	W	W	D	W	W	W
Position	1	1	1	1	1	1	1	1	1	1	1	1	1	1	1	1	1	1	1	1	1	1	1	1	1	1	1	1	1	1	1	1	1	1	1	1	1	1

W = Win; D = Draw; L = Loss

==== Matches ====
1 August 2020 R1	Red Star	3–0	Novi Pazar	Rajko Mitić Stadium, Belgrade
19:30	Spiridonović 6'; Ivanić 13' (pen.); Vulić 81'	Report		Attendance: 0 (Note: Match was played behind closed doors due to the COVID-19 pandemic in Europe); Referee: Bojan Nikolić

5 August 2020 R2	Red Star	3–0	Radnički Niš	Rajko Mitić Stadium, Belgrade
19:00	Nikolić 43'; Spiridonović 45'; Katai 76'	Report		Attendance: 0 Referee: Lazar Lukić

9 August 2020 R3	Mačva	0–3	Red Star	Stadion FK Mačva, Šabac
18:30		Report	Krstović 24'; Nikolić 64'; Vulić 90'	Attendance: 0 Referee: Petar Piper

15 August 2020 R4	Red Star	3–2	Spartak	Rajko Mitić Stadium, Belgrade
19:00	Ben 32', 65'; Tomané 70'	Report	Tufegdžić 34'; Nikolić 72' (pen.)	Attendance: 0 Referee: Novak Simović

21 August 2020 R5	Proleter	0–1	Red Star	Karađorđe Stadium, Novi Sad
18:00		Report	Ben 77'	Attendance: 0 Referee: Dragan Čolović

30 August 2020 R6	Red Star	5–0	TSC	Rajko Mitić Stadium, Belgrade
21:00	Katai 20', 28', 45'; Gavrić 60'; Ivanić 70'	Report		Attendance: 0 Referee: Miloš Đorđić

11 September 2020 R7	Čukarički	1–3	Red Star	Čukarički Stadium, Belgrade
19:00	Savić 83'	Report	Milunović 3'; Ivanić 50'; Kanga 54' (pen.)	Attendance: 0 Referee: Lazar Lukić

20 September 2020 R8	Red Star	6–0	Voždovac	Rajko Mitić Stadium, Belgrade
21:00	Falcinelli 17', 40'; Gavrić 20'; Nikolić 55'; Ivanić 57'; Pavkov 90'	Report		Attendance: 0 Referee: Andrija Stojanović

26 September 2020 R9	Mladost	0–4	Red Star	Mladost Stadium, Lučani
18:00		Report	Gavrić 37'; Katai 54'; Falcinelli 56'; Pankov 70'	Attendance: 0 Referee: Milan Ilić

4 October 2020 R10	Red Star	3–0	Napredak	Rajko Mitić Stadium, Belgrade
18:00	Falcinelli 1'; Ivanić 9', 71' (pen.)	Report		Attendance: 0 Referee: Srđan Jovanović

18 October 2020 R11	Partizan	1–1	Red Star	Partizan Stadium, Belgrade
17:00	Stevanović 6'	Report	Katai 75' (pen.)	Attendance: 0 Referee: Novak Simović

25 October 2020 R12	Red Star	0–0	Javor	Rajko Mitić Stadium, Belgrade
21:00		Report		Attendance: 0 Referee: Dragan Čolović

1 November 2020 R13	Radnik	1–4	Red Star	Surdulica City Stadium, Surdulica
15:00	Pavlov 56'	Report	Gavrić 16'; Ben 40'; Kanga 54'; Vukanović 63'	Attendance: 0 Referee: Bojan Nikolić

8 November 2020 R14	Red Star	3–2	Inđija	Rajko Mitić Stadium, Belgrade
19:00	Falcinelli 21', 85'; Katai 75' (pen.)	Report	Nešković 36', 64'	Attendance: 0 Referee: Miloš Milanović

22 November 2020 R15	Vojvodina	0–2	Red Star	Karađorđe Stadium, Novi Sad
17:30		Report	Gajić 26'; Ben 75' (pen.)	Attendance: 0 Referee: Novak Simović

29 November 2020 R16	Red Star	3–0	Rad	Rajko Mitić Stadium, Belgrade
19:00	Pavkov 17'; Boakye 41'; Spiridonović 59'	Report		Attendance: 0 Referee: Andrija Stojanović

6 December 2020 R17	Zlatibor	0–1	Red Star	Užice City Stadium, Užice
16:00		Report	Boakye 18'	Attendance: 0 Referee: Danilo Grujić

13 December 2020 R18	Red Star	2–0	Bačka	Rajko Mitić Stadium, Belgrade
17:00	Ivanić 45'; Falcinelli 56'	Report		Attendance: 0 Referee: Dragan Čolović

16 December 2020 R19	Metalac	0–1	Red Star	Stadion Metalac, Gornji Milanovac
16:00		Report	Milunović 36'	Attendance: 0 Referee: Vladimir Tomić

7 February 2021 R20	Novi Pazar	1–3	Red Star	Novi Pazar City Stadium, Novi Pazar
13:00	Cissé 57'	Report	Rodić 2'; Pavkov 52'; Ivanić 76'	Attendance: 0 Referee: Danilo Grujić

13 February 2021 R21	Radnički Niš	0–1	Red Star	Čair Stadium, Niš
15:30		Report	Ivanić 26'	Attendance: 0 Referee: Novak Simović

11 March 2021 R22	Red Star	4–0	Mačva	Rajko Mitić Stadium, Belgrade
19:10	Katai 10', 88'; Pavkov 24'; Vukanović 79'	Report		Attendance: 0 Referee: Jovan Šegrt

21 February 2021 R23	Spartak	1–2	Red Star	Subotica City Stadium, Subotica
17:05	Furtula 35'	Report	Ivanić 80'; Sanogo 88'	Attendance: 0 Referee: Lazar Lukić

28 February 2021 R24	Red Star	4–0	Proleter	Rajko Mitić Stadium, Belgrade
17:05	Leandro 22' (o.g.); Nikolić 32'; Ben 55'; Katai 90'	Report		Attendance: 0 Referee: Novica Anđelovski

3 March 2021 R25	TSC	1–3	Red Star	Stadion Senta, Senta
16:05	Lukić 58' (pen.)	Report	Pavkov 54', 71'; Kanga 68' (pen.)	Attendance: 0 Referee: Novak Simović

7 March 2021 R26	Red Star	2–0	Čukarički	Rajko Mitić Stadium, Belgrade
19:15	Ben 72'; Katai 87' (pen.)	Report		Attendance: 0 Referee: Danilo Grujić

15 March 2021 R27	Voždovac	1–4	Red Star	Voždovac Stadium, Belgrade
16:05	Stoisavljević 4'	Report	Ben 30'; Ivanić 37'; Gavrić 67'; Vukanović 76'	Attendance: 0 Referee: Dragan Čolović

20 March 2021 R28	Red Star	4–1	Mladost	Rajko Mitić Stadium, Belgrade
19:00	Milunović 39'; Kanga 40'; Pavkov 45'; Nikolić 51'	Report	Jovanović 34'	Attendance: 0 Referee: Aleksandar Živković

3 April 2021 R29	Napredak	1–4	Red Star	Mladost Stadium, Kruševac
17:00	Milunović 73'	Report	Katai 21' (pen.); Falcinelli 25'; Ben 71'; Pavkov 76'	Attendance: 0 Referee: Jovan Šegrt

7 April 2021 R30	Red Star	1–0	Partizan	Rajko Mitić Stadium, Belgrade
18:00	Ivanić 58'	Report		Attendance: 0 Referee: Novak Simović

11 April 2021 R31	Javor	1–5	Red Star	Ivanjica Stadium, Ivanjica
15:00	Luković 4'	Report	Katai 8', 31'; Milunović 65'; Ben 72'; Falco 82'	Attendance: 0 Referee: Lazar Lukić

17 April 2021 R32	Red Star	2–1	Radnik	Rajko Mitić Stadium, Belgrade
19:00	Sanogo 54'; Ivanić 86'	Report	Milovanović 35'	Attendance: 0 Referee: Stanko Ostraćanin

25 April 2021 R33	Inđija	1–5	Red Star	Inđija Stadium, Inđija
17:00	Bastajić 64' (pen.)	Report	Nikolić 5'; Pavkov 21' (pen.), 23'; Falco 45'; Falcinelli 60'	Attendance: 0 Referee: Srđan Jovanović

29 April 2021 R34	Red Star	1–0	Vojvodina	Rajko Mitić Stadium, Belgrade
18:55	Saničanin 13' (o.g.)	Report		Attendance: 0 Referee: Danilo Grujić

5 May 2021 R35	Rad	2–2	Red Star	King Peter I Stadium, Belgrade
18:05	Mladenović 43'; Šarić 74'	Report	Falco 31'; Pavkov 42'	Attendance: 0 Referee: Nenad Minaković

9 May 2021 R36	Red Star	6–1	Zlatibor	Rajko Mitić Stadium, Belgrade
18:45	Ivanić 47', 50'; Nikolić 55'; Gavrić 67'; Kanga 70'; Pavkov 84'	Report	Vukić 26'	Attendance: 0 Referee: Đorđe Maksimović

14 May 2021 R37	Bačka	0–5	Red Star	Slavko Maletin Vava Stadium, Bačka Palanka
18:05		Report	Pavkov 15'; Gavrić 25', 36'; Petrović 32'; Ivanić 86'	Attendance: 0 Referee: Momčilo Marković

19 May 2021 R38	Red Star	5–1	Metalac	Rajko Mitić Stadium, Belgrade
16:00	Gajić 2'; Ben 5', 35'; Kanga 49'; Pavkov 77' (pen.)	Report	Maksimović 69'	Attendance: 0 Referee: Nenad Minaković

=== Serbian Cup ===
==== First round ====
16 November 2020 R1	Red Star	4–2	Zlatibor	Rajko Mitić Stadium, Belgrade
17:00	Ivanić 71'; Vukanović 73'; Pankov 84'; Radulović 86'	Report	Janjić 31'; Miloradović 56'	Attendance: 0 Referee: Petar Piper

==== Second round ====
18 December 2020 R2	Rad	1–2	Red Star	King Peter I Stadium, Belgrade
13:30	Radunović 4'	Report	Spiridonović 17'; Krstović 60'	Attendance: 0 Referee: Jovan Šegrt

==== Quarterfinal ====
30 March 2021 QF	Red Star	3–0	IMT	Rajko Mitić Stadium, Belgrade
16:00	Falcinelli 3'; Katai 11'; Falco 21'	Report		Attendance: 0 Referee: Pavle Tomić

==== Semifinal ====
21 April 2021 SF	Red Star	2–1	Radnik	Rajko Mitić Stadium, Belgrade
17:00	Milunović 2'; Falcinelli 33'	Report	Makarić 51'	Attendance: 0 Referee: Miloš Đorđić

==== Final ====
25 May 2021 F	Red Star	0–0 (4–3 p)	Partizan	Rajko Mitić Stadium, Belgrade
19:00		Report		Attendance: 0 Referee: Srđan Jovanović
	Penalties
	Rodić (penalty scored); Pankov (penalty scored); Krstović (penalty scored); Nikolić (penalty scored)		Natkho (penalty scored); Živković (penalty scored); Stevanović (penalty scored); Jojić (penalty missed); Štulić (penalty missed)

=== UEFA Champions League ===
==== First qualifying round ====
18 August 2020 QR1	Red Star (Serbia)	5–0	(Gibraltar) Europa	Rajko Mitić Stadium, Belgrade
21:00	Ben 35', 44', 52'; Ivanić 78', 87'	Report		Attendance: 0 Referee: Volen Chinkov (Bulgaria)

==== Second qualifying round ====
25 August 2020 QR2	Tirana (Albania)	0–1	(Serbia) Red Star	Arena Kombëtare, Tirana
20:00		Report	Tomané 62'	Attendance: 0 Referee: Kaspar Sjöberg (Sweden)

==== Third qualifying round ====
16 September 2020 QR3	Omonia (Cyprus)	1–1 (a.e.t.) (4–2 p)	(Serbia) Red Star	GSP Stadium, Nicosia
17:00	Lüftner 32'	Report	Ivanić 45+2'	Attendance: 0 Referee: Chris Kavanagh (England)
	Penalties
	Gómez (penalty scored); Gomes (penalty scored); Sene (penalty scored); Lecjaks (penalty scored)		Gavrić (penalty scored); Ben (penalty scored); Falcinelli (penalty missed); Degenek (penalty missed)

=== UEFA Europa League ===
==== Play-off round ====
1 October 2020 PO	Ararat-Armenia	1–2	(Serbia) Red Star	GSP Stadium, Nicosia
16:00	Lima 72'	Report	Katai 45'; Falcinelli 60'	Attendance: 0 Referee: Anastasios Sidiropoulos (Greece)

==== Group stage ====
Pos	Team	Pld	W	D	L	GF	GA	GD	Pts	Qualification	HOF	ZVE	LIB	GNT
1	(Germany) TSG Hoffenheim	6	5	1	0	17	2	+15	16	Advance to knockout phase	—	2–0	5–0	4–1
2	(Serbia) Red Star Belgrade	6	3	2	1	9	4	+5	11	Advance to knockout phase	0–0	—	5–1	2–1
3	(Czech Republic) Slovan Liberec	6	2	1	3	4	13	−9	7		0–2	0–0	—	1–0
4	(Belgium) Gent	6	0	0	6	4	15	−11	0		1–4	0–2	1–2	—

Source: UEFA
Rules for classification: Group stage tiebreakers

22 October 2020 MD1	1899 Hoffenheim (Germany)	2–0	(Serbia) Red Star	Rhein-Neckar-Arena, Sinsheim
21:00	Baumgartner 64'; Dabbur 90+3'	Report		Attendance: 0 Referee: Alejandro Hernández (Spain)

29 October 2020 MD2	Red Star (Serbia)	5–1	(Czech Republic) Slovan Liberec	Rajko Mitić Stadium, Belgrade
18:55	Ben 7', 22'; Gajić 50'; Katai 67'; Falcinelli 70'	Report	Matoušek 41'	Attendance: 0 Referee: Fábio Veríssimo (Portugal)

5 November 2020 MD3	Red Star (Serbia)	2–1	(Belgium) Gent	Rajko Mitić Stadium, Belgrade
21:00	Kanga 12'; Katai 59'	Report	Odjidja-Ofoe 31'	Attendance: 0 Referee: Michael Fabbri (Italy)

26 November 2020 MD4	Gent (Belgium)	0–2	(Serbia) Red Star	Ghelamco Arena, Ghent
18:55		Report	Petrović 2'; Milunović 58'	Attendance: 0 Referee: Filip Glova (Slovakia)

3 December 2020 MD5	Red Star (Serbia)	0–0	(Germany) 1899 Hoffenheim	Rajko Mitić Stadium, Belgrade
18:55		Report		Attendance: 0 Referee: Bobby Madden (Scotland)

10 December 2020 MD6	Slovan Liberec (Czech Republic)	0–0	(Serbia) Red Star	Stadion u Nisy, Liberec
21:00		Report		Attendance: 0 Referee: Mattias Gestranius (Finland)

==== Round of 32 ====
18 February 2021 1st leg	Red Star (Serbia)	2–2	(Italy) Milan	Rajko Mitić Stadium, Belgrade
18:55	Kanga 52' (pen.); Pavkov 90+3'	Report	Pankov 42' (o.g.); Hernandez 61' (pen.)	Attendance: 0 Referee: Anastasios Sidiropoulos (Greece)

25 February 2021 2nd leg	Milan (Italy)	1–1 (3 (a)–3 agg.)	(Serbia) Red Star	San Siro, Milan
21:00	Kessié 9' (pen.)	Report	Ben 24'	Attendance: 0 Referee: Jesús Gil Manzano (Spain)

== Squad ==
=== Squad statistics ===
No.	Pos	Nat	Player	Total		SuperLiga		Cup		Champions League		Europa League	
No.	Pos	Nat	Player	Apps	Goals	Apps	Goals	Apps	Goals	Apps	Goals	Apps	Goals
Goalkeepers
1	GK	(Serbia) SRB	Zoran Popović	9	0	7	0	2	0	0	0	0	0
32	GK	(Serbia) SRB	Marko Ćopić	0	0	0	0	0	0	0	0	0	0
82	GK	(Canada) CAN	Milan Borjan	47	0	32	0	3	0	3	0	9	0
Defenders
2	DF	(Serbia) SRB	Milan Gajić	49	3	35	2	3	0	2	0	9	1
5	DF	(Australia) AUS	Miloš Degenek	47	0	30	0	5	0	3	0	9	0
6	DF	(Serbia) SRB	Radovan Pankov	44	2	32	1	3	1	1	0	8	0
19	DF	(Serbia) SRB	Nemanja Milunović	36	6	22	4	4	1	3	0	7	1
23	DF	(Serbia) SRB	Milan Rodić	39	1	28	1	3	0	3	0	5	0
25	DF	(Serbia) SRB	Strahinja Eraković	19	0	13	0	2	0	0	0	4	0
77	DF	(Serbia) SRB	Marko Gobeljić	40	0	26	0	5	0	3	0	6	0
Midfielders
3	MF	(Kenya) KEN	Richard Odada	2	0	2	0	0	0	0	0	0	0
4	MF	(Montenegro) MNE	Mirko Ivanić	48	20	33	16	5	1	3	3	7	0
7	MF	(France) FRA	Axel Bakayoko	4	0	2	0	1	0	0	0	1	0
8	MF	(Gabon) GAB	Guélor Kanga	37	8	26	6	2	0	3	0	6	2
10	MF	(Serbia) SRB	Aleksandar Katai	34	18	23	14	3	1	3	0	5	3
11	MF	(Italy) ITA	Filippo Falco	10	4	7	3	1	1	0	0	2	0
20	MF	(Serbia) SRB	Njegoš Petrović	47	2	35	1	2	0	1	0	9	1
22	MF	(Serbia) SRB	Veljko Nikolić	49	7	35	7	5	0	1	0	8	0
24	MF	(Serbia) SRB	Željko Gavrić	31	8	27	8	1	0	1	0	2	0
35	MF	(Ivory Coast) CIV	Sékou Sanogo	38	2	23	2	5	0	3	0	7	0
49	MF	(Serbia) SRB	Andrija Radulović	9	1	6	0	2	1	0	0	1	0
55	MF	(Serbia) SRB	Slavoljub Srnić	21	0	17	0	3	0	0	0	1	0
Forwards
9	FW	(Serbia) SRB	Milan Pavkov	32	15	25	14	4	0	0	0	3	1
16	FW	(Italy) ITA	Diego Falcinelli	37	13	23	9	4	2	1	0	9	2
31	FW	(Comoros) COM	Ben	42	18	29	12	2	0	2	3	9	3
92	FW	(Serbia) SRB	Aleksa Vukanović	30	4	21	3	4	1	1	0	4	0
99	FW	(Montenegro) MNE	Nikola Krstović	13	2	11	1	2	1	0	0	0	0
Players transferred out during the season
3	MF	(Serbia) SRB	Branko Jovičić	2	0	2	0	0	0	0	0	0	0
7	MF	(Serbia) SRB	Miloš Vulić	5	2	4	2	0	0	1	0	0	0
14	FW	(Ghana) GHA	Richmond Boakye	13	2	8	2	2	0	0	0	3	0
17	FW	(Portugal) POR	Tomané	6	2	4	1	0	0	2	1	0	0
21	MF	(Serbia) SRB	Veljko Simić	3	0	1	0	1	0	0	0	1	0
28	FW	(Serbia) SRB	Marko Lazetić	1	0	1	0	0	0	0	0	0	0
29	MF	(Serbia) SRB	Dušan Jovančić	1	0	0	0	0	0	1	0	0	0
70	MF	(Austria) AUT	Srđan Spiridonović	24	4	16	3	2	1	2	0	4	0

Last updated: 25 May 2021
Source: Competitions

=== Goalscorers ===
Includes all competitive matches. The list is sorted by shirt number when total goals are equal.

As of 25 May 2021

Rank	Pos	No.	Player	League	Cup	Champions League	Europa League	Total
1	MF	4	(Montenegro) Mirko Ivanić	16	1	3	0	20
2	MF	10	(Serbia) Aleksandar Katai	14	1	0	3	18
2	FW	31	(Comoros) Ben	12	0	3	3	18
4	FW	9	(Serbia) Milan Pavkov	14	0	0	1	15
5	FW	16	(Italy) Diego Falcinelli	9	2	0	2	13
6	MF	8	(Gabon) Guélor Kanga	6	0	0	2	8
6	MF	24	(Serbia) Željko Gavrić	8	0	0	0	8
8	MF	22	(Serbia) Veljko Nikolić	7	0	0	0	7
9	DF	19	(Serbia) Nemanja Milunović	4	1	0	1	6
10	MF	11	(Italy) Filippo Falco	3	1	0	0	4
10	MF	70	(Austria) Srđan Spiridonović	3	1	0	0	4
10	FW	92	(Serbia) Aleksa Vukanović	3	1	0	0	4
13	DF	2	(Serbia) Milan Gajić	2	0	0	1	3
17	DF	6	(Serbia) Radovan Pankov	1	1	0	0	2
17	MF	7	(Serbia) Miloš Vulić	2	0	0	0	2
17	FW	14	(Ghana) Richmond Boakye	2	0	0	0	2
17	FW	17	(Portugal) Tomané	1	0	1	0	2
17	MF	20	(Serbia) Njegoš Petrović	1	0	0	1	2
17	MF	35	(Ivory Coast) Sékou Sanogo	2	0	0	0	2
17	FW	99	(Montenegro) Nikola Krstović	1	1	0	0	2
21	DF	23	(Serbia) Milan Rodić	1	0	0	0	1
21	MF	49	(Serbia) Andrija Radulović	0	1	0	0	1
Own goals				2	0	0	0	2
TOTALS				114	11	7	14	146

=== Clean sheets ===
Includes all competitive matches. The list is sorted by shirt number when total clean sheets are equal.

As of 25 May 2021

Rank	No.	Player	League	Cup	Champions League	Europa League	Total
1	82	(Canada) Milan Borjan	17	1	2	3	23
2	1	(Serbia) Zoran Popović	4	1	0	0	5
TOTALS			21	2	2	3	28

=== Disciplinary record ===
As of 25 May 2021

Rank	No.	Pos	Player	League			Cup			Champions League			Europa League			Total		
Rank	No.	Pos	Player	Booked	(yellow card) (yellow-red card)	Sent off (straight red)	Booked	(yellow card) (yellow-red card)	Sent off (straight red)	Booked	(yellow card) (yellow-red card)	Sent off (straight red)	Booked	(yellow card) (yellow-red card)	Sent off (straight red)	Booked	(yellow card) (yellow-red card)	Sent off (straight red)
1	77	DF	(Serbia) Marko Gobeljić	3	0	0	0	1	0	0	0	0	2	1	0	5	2	0
2	35	MF	(Ivory Coast) Sékou Sanogo	6	1	0	1	0	0	3	0	0	3	0	0	13	1	0
3	23	DF	(Serbia) Milan Rodić	7	0	0	0	0	0	0	0	0	1	1	0	8	1	0
4	2	DF	(Serbia) Milan Gajić	3	0	1	0	0	0	1	0	0	1	0	0	5	0	1
5	19	DF	(Serbia) Nemanja Milunović	3	0	0	1	0	0	1	0	0	3	0	0	8	0	0
6	5	DF	(Australia) Miloš Degenek	3	0	0	1	0	0	0	0	0	1	0	0	5	0	0
6	9	FW	(Serbia) Milan Pavkov	3	0	0	2	0	0	0	0	0	0	0	0	5	0	0
6	10	MF	(Serbia) Aleksandar Katai	2	0	0	0	0	0	1	0	0	2	0	0	5	0	0
9	16	FW	(Italy) Diego Falcinelli	1	0	0	0	0	0	0	0	0	3	0	0	4	0	0
9	20	MF	(Serbia) Njegoš Petrović	4	0	0	0	0	0	0	0	0	0	0	0	4	0	0
11	6	DF	(Serbia) Radovan Pankov	3	0	0	0	0	0	0	0	0	0	0	0	3	0	0
11	8	MF	(Gabon) Guélor Kanga	2	0	0	0	0	0	0	0	0	1	0	0	3	0	0
11	14	FW	(Ghana) Richmond Boakye	3	0	0	0	0	0	0	0	0	0	0	0	3	0	0
11	31	FW	(Comoros) Ben	1	0	0	1	0	0	0	0	0	1	0	0	3	0	0
11	55	MF	(Serbia) Slavoljub Srnić	2	0	0	0	0	0	0	0	0	1	0	0	3	0	0
11	82	GK	(Canada) Milan Borjan	2	0	0	0	0	0	0	0	0	1	0	0	3	0	0
17	22	MF	(Serbia) Veljko Nikolić	2	0	0	0	0	0	0	0	0	0	0	0	2	0	0
17	24	MF	(Serbia) Željko Gavrić	2	0	0	0	0	0	0	0	0	0	0	0	2	0	0
17	25	DF	(Serbia) Strahinja Eraković	2	0	0	0	0	0	0	0	0	0	0	0	2	0	0
17	99	FW	(Montenegro) Nikola Krstović	1	0	0	1	0	0	0	0	0	0	0	0	2	0	0
21	4	MF	(Montenegro) Mirko Ivanić	0	0	0	0	0	0	0	0	0	1	0	0	1	0	0
TOTALS				55	1	1	7	1	0	6	0	0	21	2	0	89	4	1

== Transfers ==
=== In ===
#	Pos.	Player	Transferred from	Date	Fee
Summer
70	MF	(Austria) Srđan Spiridonović	(Poland) Pogoń Szczecin	23 June 2020	Undisclosed (~ €250,000)
10	MF	(Serbia) Aleksandar Katai	(United States) LA Galaxy	10 July 2020	Free
8	MF	(Gabon) Guélor Kanga	(Czech Republic) Sparta Prague	31 July 2020	Free
16	FW	(Italy) Diego Falcinelli	(Italy) Bologna	11 September 2020	Loan
	FW	(Serbia) Luka Marković	(Italy) Crotone	14 September 2020	Free
Winter
7	FW	(France) Axel Bakayoko	(Italy) Internazionale	22 December 2020	Free
55	MF	(Serbia) Slavoljub Srnić	(Spain) Las Palmas	25 December 2020	Free
35	MF	(Ivory Coast) Sékou Sanogo	(Saudi Arabia) Al-Ittihad	27 January 2021	Free (Note: Sanogo was previously on loan from Al-Ittihad.)
11	MF	(Italy) Filippo Falco	(Italy) Lecce	29 January 2021	Undisclosed (~ €1,200,000)

=== Out ===
#	Pos.	Player	Transferred to	Date	Fee
Summer
	FW	(Serbia) Edvin Eleven	(Serbia) TSC	2 July 2020	Undisclosed
33	MF	(Serbia) Milan Jevtović	(Denmark) AGF	13 July 2020	Free
	MF	(Bosnia and Herzegovina) Stefan Santrač	(Serbia) TSC	14 July 2020	Undisclosed
	GK	(Serbia) Strahinja Savić	(Serbia) Metalac	17 July 2020	Free
8	MF	(Serbia) Dejan Meleg	(Bosnia and Herzegovina) Borac	28 July 2020	Free
	MF	(Serbia) Nikola Njamculović	(Serbia) Bačka	28 July 2020	Free
	DF	(Montenegro) Mirko Milikić	(Serbia) Inđija	30 July 2020	Free
	MF	(Serbia) Milan Tomić	(North Macedonia) Akademija Pandev	31 July 2020	Free
	FW	(Serbia) Uroš Milovanović	(Serbia) Radnički Niš	1 August 2020	Undisclosed
73	FW	(Serbia) Jug Stanojev	(Serbia) TSC	4 August 2020	Free
	DF	(Serbia) Vladimir Prijović	(Denmark) AaB	11 August 2020	Undisclosed (~ €210,000)
87	MF	(Spain) José Cañas	(Spain) Atlético Baleares	19 August 2020	Contract Terminated
	FW	(Serbia) Njegoš Kupusović	(Germany) Eintracht Braunschweig	24 August 2020	Free
	FW	(Serbia) Luka Velikić	(Spain) Osasuna	25 August 2020	Free
3	MF	(Serbia) Branko Jovičić	(Russia) Ural	2 September 2020	Undisclosed (~ €300,000)
7	MF	(Serbia) Miloš Vulić	(Italy) Crotone	5 September 2020	Undisclosed (~ €800,000)
17	FW	(Portugal) Tomané	(Turkey) Samsunspor	15 September 2020	Undisclosed (~ €600,000)
11	MF	(Argentina) Mateo García	(Greece) Aris	2 October 2020	Undisclosed (~ €1.300,000)
29	MF	(Serbia) Dušan Jovančić	(Turkey) Çaykur Rizespor	5 October 2020	Undisclosed (~ €400,000)
Winter
14	FW	(Ghana) Richmond Boakye	(Poland) Górnik Zabrze	1 January 2021	Free
44	DF	(Serbia) Stefan Hajdin	(Serbia) Voždovac	1 January 2021	Free
21	MF	(Serbia) Veljko Simić	(Serbia) Vojvodina	11 January 2021	Free
	MF	(Serbia) Stefan Fićović	(Serbia) Metalac	2 February 2021	Undisclosed

=== Loan returns and promotions ===
#	Position	Player	Returned from	Date
Summer
25	DF	(Serbia) Strahinja Eraković	(Serbia) Grafičar Beograd	11 July 2020
27	GK	(Serbia) Nikola Vasiljević	(Serbia) Radnik Surdulica	11 July 2020
44	DF	(Serbia) Stefan Hajdin	(Serbia) Voždovac	11 July 2020
99	FW	(Montenegro) Nikola Krstović	(Serbia) Grafičar Beograd	11 July 2020
28	FW	(Serbia) Marko Lazetić	Promoted from youth	29 November 2020
Winter
3	MF	(Kenya) Richard Odada	(Serbia) Grafičar Beograd	10 January 2021

=== Loan out ===
#	Position	Player	Loaned to	Date
Summer
30	MF	(Serbia) Miloš Pantović	(Serbia) Voždovac	13 July 2020
33	DF	(Serbia) Marko Konatar	(Serbia) Inđija	13 July 2020
	MF	(Serbia) Nenad Adžibaba	(Serbia) Radnički Pirot	13 July 2020
	MF	(Serbia) Vukan Đorđević	(Serbia) Radnički Pirot	13 July 2020
	MF	(Serbia) Ilija Stojančić	(Serbia) Loznica	14 July 2020
51	GK	(Serbia) Miloš Gordić	(Serbia) Mačva	15 July 2020
	GK	(Serbia) Miloš Čupić	(Serbia) Zlatibor Čajetina	18 July 2020
	DF	(Serbia) Nemanja Stojić	(Serbia) Zlatibor Čajetina	18 July 2020
	MF	(Ghana) Ibrahim Mustapha	(Serbia) Zlatibor Čajetina	18 July 2020
30	DF	(Serbia) Uroš Blagojević	(Serbia) Grafičar Beograd	21 July 2020
32	GK	(Serbia) Aleksandar Stanković	(Serbia) Grafičar Beograd	21 July 2020
34	MF	(Serbia) Aleksa Matić	(Serbia) Grafičar Beograd	21 July 2020
36	DF	(Serbia) Aleksandar Lukić	(Serbia) Grafičar Beograd	21 July 2020
40	FW	(Serbia) Borisav Burmaz	(Serbia) Grafičar Beograd	21 July 2020
99	FW	(Serbia) Ilija Babić	(Serbia) Grafičar Beograd	21 July 2020
	GK	(Serbia) Ivan Guteša	(Serbia) Grafičar Beograd	21 July 2020
	DF	(Serbia) Milomir Čvorić	(Serbia) Grafičar Beograd	21 July 2020
	DF	(Serbia) Stefan Mitrović	(Serbia) Grafičar Beograd	21 July 2020
	MF	(Serbia) Petar Piplica	(Serbia) Grafičar Beograd	21 July 2020
	MF	(Kenya) Richard Odada	(Serbia) Grafičar Beograd	21 July 2020
	MF	(Serbia) Filip Vasiljević	(Serbia) Grafičar Beograd	21 July 2020
	MF	(Serbia) Stefan Fićović	(Serbia) Grafičar Beograd	21 July 2020
	FW	(Slovenia) Vanja Panić	(Serbia) Grafičar Beograd	21 July 2020
	MF	(The Gambia) Ousman Marong	(Israel) Hapoel Ra'anana	22 July 2020
	MF	(Serbia) Martin Novaković	(Serbia) Rad	30 July 2020
51	GK	(Serbia) Andrija Katić	(Serbia) Budućnost Dobanovci	10 August 2020
36	MF	(Slovakia) Erik Jirka	(Spain) Mirandés	13 August 2020
	MF	(Serbia) Mateja Stojanović	(Serbia) OFK Žarkovo	14 August 2020
15	DF	(Serbia) Srđan Babić	(Portugal) Famalicão	31 August 2020
	DF	(Serbia) Nikola Stajić	(Spain) San Fernando	13 September 2020
	FW	(Serbia) Luka Marković	(Serbia) Novi Pazar	22 September 2020
	DF	(Serbia) Nemanja Stojić	(Serbia) Grafičar Beograd	1 October 2020
Winter
51	GK	(Serbia) Andrija Katić	(Serbia) IMT	8 January 2021
33	DF	(Serbia) Marko Konatar	(Serbia) Železničar Pančevo	12 January 2021
29	MF	(Serbia) Mateja Bačanin	(Serbia) Grafičar Beograd	13 January 2021
	DF	(Serbia) Stefan Despotovski	(Serbia) Grafičar Beograd	13 January 2021
	DF	(Serbia) Andrej Đurić	(Serbia) Grafičar Beograd	13 January 2021
	DF	(Serbia) Uroš Lazić	(Serbia) Grafičar Beograd	13 January 2021
	FW	(Serbia) Dejan Vidić	(Serbia) Grafičar Beograd	13 January 2021
30	DF	(Serbia) Uroš Blagojević	(Serbia) Novi Pazar	24 January 2021
	FW	(Serbia) Luka Marković	(Serbia) Mačva	24 January 2021
	FW	(Slovenia) Vanja Panić	(Serbia) Mačva	24 January 2021
70	MF	(Austria) Srđan Spiridonović	(Turkey) Gençlerbirliği	25 January 2021
	MF	(The Gambia) Ousman Marong	(Serbia) Grafičar Beograd	1 February 2021
27	GK	(Serbia) Nikola Vasiljević	(Serbia) Proleter Novi Sad	1 February 2021
28	FW	(Serbia) Marko Lazetić	(Serbia) Grafičar Beograd	4 February 2021
38	MF	(Serbia) Nikola Stanković	(Serbia) Grafičar Beograd	4 February 2021

== See also ==
- 2020–21 KK Crvena zvezda season
