= Charly Keita =

Ivorian footballer

Personal information
- Full name: Charly Soualio Keïta
- Date of birth: 16 June 1999 (age 27)
- Place of birth: Yopougon, Ivory Coast
- Height: 1.92 m (6 ft 4 in)
- Position: Striker

Team information
- Current team: IMT
- Number: 99

Youth career
- Pau

Senior career*
Years	Team	Apps	(Gls)
2019–2021	Pau II	9	(5)
2021–2022	Pau	2	(1)
2022–2023	Sedan	28	(3)
2023	Clermont	0	(0)
2023	→ Biel-Bienne (loan)	14	(4)
2023–2025	Beerschot	48	(5)
2025	Amedspor	15	(2)
2025–	IMT	24	(4)
- * Club domestic league appearances and goals as of 13 June 2026

Charly Soualio Keïta (born 16 June 1999) is an Ivorian professional footballer who plays as a striker for Serbian Superliga club IMT.

== Career ==
A youth product of Pau, Keita was promoted to the club's first team in September 2021. He made his debut for the club as a late sub in a 2–1 Ligue 2 loss to Quevilly-Rouen on 11 December 2021, scoring his side's only goal in the 87th minute. On 1 January 2022, he moved to Sedan.

On 25 January 2023, Keita signed for Ligue 1 club Clermont Foot on an eighteen-month contract, joining partner Swiss 1. Liga club Biel-Bienne on loan until the end of the season.

On 1 August 2023, Keita signed for Belgian Challenger Pro League club Beerschot on an initial two-year deal with the option for a further year.

Dirk Kuyt was appointed mid-season as first-team coach, inspiring a surge up the table to see Beerschot crowned as Challenger Pro League champions for 2023–24, earning promotion to the top flight, the Belgian Pro League, after only two years away.

On 31 January 2025, Keita moved to Amed in Turkey.

== Honours ==
Beerschot

- First Division B/Challenger Pro League: 2023-24
