= Veljko Nikolić =

Serbian association footballer

Personal information
- Date of birth: 29 August 1999 (age 27)
- Place of birth: Belgrade, FR Yugoslavia
- Height: 1.76 m (5 ft 9 in)
- Position: Midfielder

Team information
- Current team: Aris Limassol
- Number: 22

Youth career
- OFK Beograd
- Red Star Belgrade

Senior career*
Years	Team	Apps	(Gls)
2017–2023	Red Star Belgrade	61	(9)
2017	→ OFK Beograd (loan)	5	(0)
2018–2019	→ Grafičar (loan)	37	(12)
2023–	Aris Limassol	72	(8)

International career^{‡}
2014–2015	Serbia U16	16	(3)
2015–2016	Serbia U17	17	(1)
2016–2017	Serbia U18	7	(0)
2016–2018	Serbia U19	15	(0)
2020	Serbia U21	2	(1)
- * Club domestic league appearances and goals as of 26 October 2026 ‡ National team caps and goals as of 9 October 2020

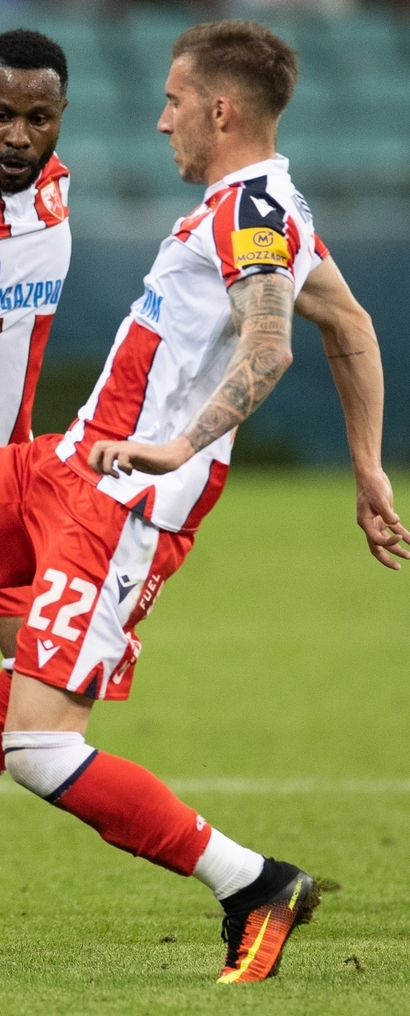

Veljko Nikolić (Serbian Cyrillic: Вељко Николић; born 29 August 1999) is a Serbian professional footballer who plays as a midfielder for Aris Limassol.

== Club career ==
=== OFK Beograd ===
Veljko started playing football with football school "Arena" and later moved to OFK Beograd, where he passed all youth categories. He was promoted in the first team for the 2016–17 Serbian First League season. Nikolić made his senior debut for OFK Beograd on 27 August 2016, playing match against ČSK Čelarevo in third fixture match of the season. He had started the match on the field and was replaced in the second half by Filip Rajevac. He also played next four First League and a cup match against Sloboda Užice.

=== Red Star Belgrade ===
On 4 October 2016, Nikolić signed a three-year contract with Red Star Belgrade in an €80,000 transfer from OFK Beograd. The transfer initially had a clause which would have given OFK Beograd 20% of the sum of Nikolić's next transfer, but Red Star purchased the last 20% of his contract for €60,000 in February 2017. Nikolić made his debut for Red Star in a friendly match Njegoš Lovćenac on 18 October 2016. On 15 March 2019, he extended his contract with Red Star to the summer of 2023. On 20 November 2019, he made his Serbian Cup debut for Red Star in a 1–0 win against Mačva in the Round of 16.

== International career ==
Nikolić was a member of Serbia U16 and Serbia U17 squads between 2014 and 2016. In August 2016, Nikolić was called into Serbia U19 squad for memorial tournament "Stevan Vilotić - Ćele", where he debuted in opening match against United States.

== Career statistics ==
=== Club ===
As of end of 2023—24 season

Appearances and goals by club, season and competition
Club	Season	League			Cup		Continental		Other		Total	
Club	Season	Division	Apps	Goals	Apps	Goals	Apps	Goals	Apps	Goals	Apps	Goals
OFK Beograd	2016–17	First League	5	0	1	0	—		—		6	0
Grafičar Beograd	2017–18	Serbian League Belgrade	13	0	0	0	—		—		13	0
Grafičar Beograd	2018–19	Serbian League Belgrade	24	12	0	0	—		—		24	12
Grafičar Beograd	Total		37	12	0	0	—		—		37	12
Red Star Belgrade	2019–20	Serbian SuperLiga	11	1	1	0	—		—		12	1
Red Star Belgrade	2020–21	Serbian SuperLiga	35	7	5	0	9	0	—		49	7
Red Star Belgrade	2021–22	Serbian SuperLiga	6	0	1	0	1	0	—		8	0
Red Star Belgrade	2022–23	Serbian SuperLiga	9	1	1	0	3	1	—		13	2
Red Star Belgrade	Total		61	9	8	0	13	1	—		82	10
Aris Limassol	2023–24	Cypriot First Division	28	1	4	1	5	0	—		37	2
Career total			131	22	13	1	18	1	—		162	24

== Honours ==
Red Star Belgrade

- Serbian SuperLiga: 2019–20, 2020–21, 2021–22, 2022–23
- Serbian Cup (3): 2020–21, 2021–22, 2022–23
