= Vicky Kiankaulua =

French footballer (born 2001)

Personal information
- Date of birth: 3 August 2001 (age 25)
- Place of birth: Ivry-sur-Seine, France
- Height: 1.85 m (6 ft 1 in)
- Position: Winger

Team information
- Current team: IMT
- Number: 94

Youth career
- 2010–2019: Paris UC
- 2019–2020: Guingamp

Senior career*
Years	Team	Apps	(Gls)
2020–2023	Guingamp II	39	(3)
2022–2023	Guingamp	4	(0)
2023–2024	RAAL La Louvière	33	(6)
2024–2025	Patro Eisden	29	(5)
2025–	IMT	23	(0)
- * Club domestic league appearances and goals as of 13 June 2026

Vicky Junior Kiankaulua (born 3 August 2001) is a French professional footballer who plays as a winger for Serbian Superliga club IMT.

== Club career ==
Kiankaulua began playing football at Paris UC in 2010 where he spent most of his youth development, before signing a professional contract with Guingamp on 14 May 2019. He began his senior career with their reserves in the Championnat National in 2020. He made his senior and professional debut with Guingamp as a late substitute in a 6–3 Ligue 2 win over FC Metz on 12 September 2022.

In 2023, Kiankaulua joined Belgian National Division 1 club RAAL La Louvière.

== Personal life ==
Born in France, Kiankaulua is French-Congolese.
