= Andrej Đurić =

Montenegrin footballer

Personal information
- Date of birth: 21 September 2003 (age 23)
- Place of birth: Belgrade, Serbia and Montenegro
- Height: 1.92 m (6 ft 4 in)
- Position: Centre-back

Team information
- Current team: Malmö FF
- Number: 5

Youth career
- –2021: Red Star Belgrade
- 2020: → Grafičar Beograd (youth loan)

Senior career*
Years	Team	Apps	(Gls)
2021–2022	Red Star Belgrade	1	(0)
2021	→ Grafičar Beograd (loan)	28	(0)
2022	→ Domžale (loan)	16	(2)
2023	Domžale	17	(0)
2023–2025	Red Star Belgrade	13	(0)
2023–2024	→ Spartak Trnava (loan)	11	(0)
2024	→ Novi Pazar (loan)	8	(0)
2025–	Malmö FF	27	(1)

International career^{‡}
2022	Serbia U19	2	(0)
2023	Serbia U21	2	(0)
2024–	Montenegro U21	4	(0)
2026–	Montenegro	3	(0)
- * Club domestic league appearances and goals as of 19 September 2026 ‡ National team caps and goals as of 13 November 2026

Andrej Đurić (Serbian Cyrillic: Андреј Ђурић; born 21 September 2003) is a Montenegrin professional footballer who plays as a centre-back for Allsvenskan club Malmö FF and the Montenegro national team.

== Club career ==
Andrej Đurić was born on September 21, 2003 and went through the entire Red Star Belgrade Youth School. After winning the Serbian Cadet League, and then the Serbian Youth League with the captain's armband around his arm, the offspring of the generation led from the bench by Marko Neđić, he moved to Grafičar Beograd development team where he took his first senior steps. This was followed by a transfer to the Red Star Belgrade first team where he made his official debut for the first team and he also made three appearances under Dejan Stanković, and a new hardening in the Domžale jersey, where he stood out as one of the best players in the Slovenian PrvaLiga. In August 2023, he extended his contract with Red Star Belgrade club, while in the following year and a half he played for Spartak Trnava and Novi Pazar as a Red Star Belgrade loanee.

In February 2025 transfer window, he ended his loanee from Novi Pazar and he back to Red Star Belgrade team.

== Career statistics ==
=== Club ===
As of 19 September 2026

Appearances and goals by club, season and competition
Club	Season	League			National cup (Note: Includes Slovenian Cup, Serbian Cup, Slovak Cup, Svenska Cupen)		Continental		Total	
Club	Season	Division	Apps	Goals	Apps	Goals	Apps	Goals	Apps	Goals
Grafičar Beograd (loan)	2020–21	Serbian First League	13	0	0	0	—		13	0
Grafičar Beograd (loan)	2021–22	Serbian First League	15	0	0	0	—		15	0
Grafičar Beograd (loan)	Total		28	0	0	0	0	0	28	0
Red Star Belgrade	2021–22	Serbian SuperLiga	1	0	0	0	0	0	1	0
Domžale (loan)	2022–23	Slovenian PrvaLiga	16	2	1	0	—		17	2
Domžale	2023–24	Slovenian PrvaLiga	17	0	1	0	2 (Note: Appearances in UEFA Conference League)	0	20	0
Red Star Belgrade	2023–24	Serbian SuperLiga	0	0	0	0	—		0	0
Red Star Belgrade	2024–25	Serbian SuperLiga	13	0	4	0	—		17	0
Red Star Belgrade	2025–26	Serbian SuperLiga	0	0	0	0	—		0	0
Red Star Belgrade	Total		13	0	4	0	—		17	0
Spartak Trnava (loan)	2023–24	Slovak First League	11	0	3	0	4	0	18	0
Novi Pazar (loan)	2024–25	Serbian SuperLiga	8	0	—		—		8	0
Malmö FF	2025	Allsvenskan	9	0	1	0	9 (Note: Four appearances in UEFA Champions League, five appearances in UEFA Europa League)	0	19	0
Malmö FF	2026	Allsvenskan	18	1	0	0	—		18	1
Malmö FF	Total		27	1	1	0	9	0	37	1
Career total			121	3	10	0	15	0	146	3

=== International ===
As of match played 12 November 2026

Appearances and goals by national team and year
National team	Year	Apps	Goals
Montenegro	2026	3	0
Total		3	0

== Honours ==
Red Star Belgrade

- Serbian SuperLiga: 2021–22
- Serbian Cup: 2021–22
