= Miloš Gordić =

Serbian football player

Personal information
- Date of birth: 5 March 2000 (age 26)
- Place of birth: Belgrade, FR Yugoslavia
- Height: 1.91 m (6 ft 3 in)
- Position: Goalkeeper

Youth career
- –2019: Red Star Belgrade

Senior career*
Years	Team	Apps	(Gls)
2020–2024	Red Star Belgrade	3	(0)
2020–2021	→ Mačva Šabac (loan)	34	(0)
2022–2023	→ AEK Larnaca (loan)	0	(0)
2023–2024	→ IMT (loan)	32	(0)
2024–2025	Gil Vicente	0	(0)

International career^{‡}
2016–2017	Serbia U17	11	(0)
2017–2018	Serbia U18	3	(0)
2018–2019	Serbia U19	9	(0)
2021–2022	Serbia U21	12	(0)
2021–	Serbia	1	(0)
- * Club domestic league appearances and goals as of 16 May 2025 ‡ National team caps and goals as of 7 June 2022

Miloš Gordić (Serbian Cyrillic: Милош Гордић; born 5 March 2000) is a Serbian professional footballer who plays as a goalkeeper.

He was capped by Serbia in a January 2021 friendly match away against Panama, coming on as a 84th-minute substitute for Aleksandar Popović.

== Career statistics ==
=== Club ===
As of match played 24 May 2024.

Appearances and goals by club, season and competition
Club	Season	League			National cup		League cup		Europe		Other		Total	
Club	Season	Division	Apps	Goals	Apps	Goals	Apps	Goals	Apps	Goals	Apps	Goals	Apps	Goals
Red Star Belgrade	2021–22	Serbian SuperLiga	3	0	0	0	—		0	0	—		3	0
Mačva Šabac (loan)	2019–20	Serbian SuperLiga	3	0	0	0	—		—		—		3	0
Mačva Šabac (loan)	2020–21	Serbian SuperLiga	31	0	0	0	—		—		—		31	0
Mačva Šabac (loan)	Total		34	0	0	0	—		—		—		34	0
AEK Larnaca (loan)	2022–23	Cypriot First Division	0	0	0	0	—		0	0	—		0	0
IMT (loan)	2023–24	Serbian SuperLiga	32	0	0	0	—		—		—		32	0
Career total			69	0	0	0	0	0	0	0	0	0	69	0

=== International ===
As of 29 January 2021

Serbia
Year	Apps	Goals
2021	1	0
Total	1	0

== Honours ==
=== Club ===
Red Star Belgrade

- Serbian SuperLiga: 2021–22
- Serbian Cup: 2021–22
