= Nemanja Milunović =

Serbian footballer (born 1989)

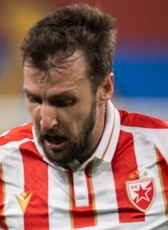

Personal information
- Full name: Nemanja Milunović
- Date of birth: 31 May 1989 (age 37)
- Place of birth: Čačak, SR Serbia, SFR Yugoslavia
- Height: 1.93 m (6 ft 4 in)
- Position: Centre back

Team information
- Current team: FK Spartak Subotica
- Number: 19

Senior career*
Years	Team	Apps	(Gls)
2008–2011	Borac Čačak	4	(1)
2008–2009	→ Mladost Lučani (loan)	31	(0)
2010–2011	→ Mladost Lučani (loan)	26	(0)
2011–2015	Mladost Lučani	96	(12)
2015–2018	BATE Borisov	59	(6)
2019–2021	Red Star Belgrade	54	(6)
2021–2022	Alanyaspor	27	(1)
2022–2024	Red Star Belgrade	27	(0)
2024–2025	Železničar Pančevo	27	(1)
2025–	FK Spartak Subotica	9	(2)

International career^{‡}
2016–2019	Serbia	4	(1)
- * Club domestic league appearances and goals as of 13 June 2026 ‡ National team caps and goals as of 11 October 2019

Nemanja Milunović (Serbian Cyrillic: Немања Милуновић, pronounced [němaɲa mǐlunoʋitɕ, - milǔː-]; born 31 May 1989) is a Serbian professional footballer who plays as a centre back for FK Spartak Subotica.

== Club career ==
=== Early career ===
Milunović made his professional debut with hometown club Borac Čačak, but saw little playing time. He was then loaned to Mladost Lučani for the 2010–11 season; at the time the team played in the Serbia's second tier. Mladost Lučani returned to the Serbian SuperLiga the following season, during which Milunović played a total of 30 games and scored a total of six goals. Eventually, Mladost Lučani purchased Milunović's contract from Borac Čačak. At Mladost Lučani, Milunović was coached by Neško Milovanović.

=== BATE Borisov ===
In 2015, Milunović joined Belarusian team BATE Borisov in a €300,000 transfer from Mladost Lučani. He played in the team's 2015–16 UEFA Champions League campaign under coach Alyaksandr Yermakovich. On 16 September 2015, he scored BATE's only goal in their first Champions League match that season, a 4–1 loss against Bayer Leverkusen. Although BATE was last in their group by the end of the 2015 UEFA Champions League group stage, BATE's general secretary Andrei Vashkevich stated that Milunović was one of the team's most consistent players, even suggesting that he had a chance to be named the Vysheyshaya Liga's Player of the Year. Milunović was subsequently named in the ideal team of the Belarus's Vysheyshaya Liga for two consecutive seasons.

=== Red Star Belgrade ===
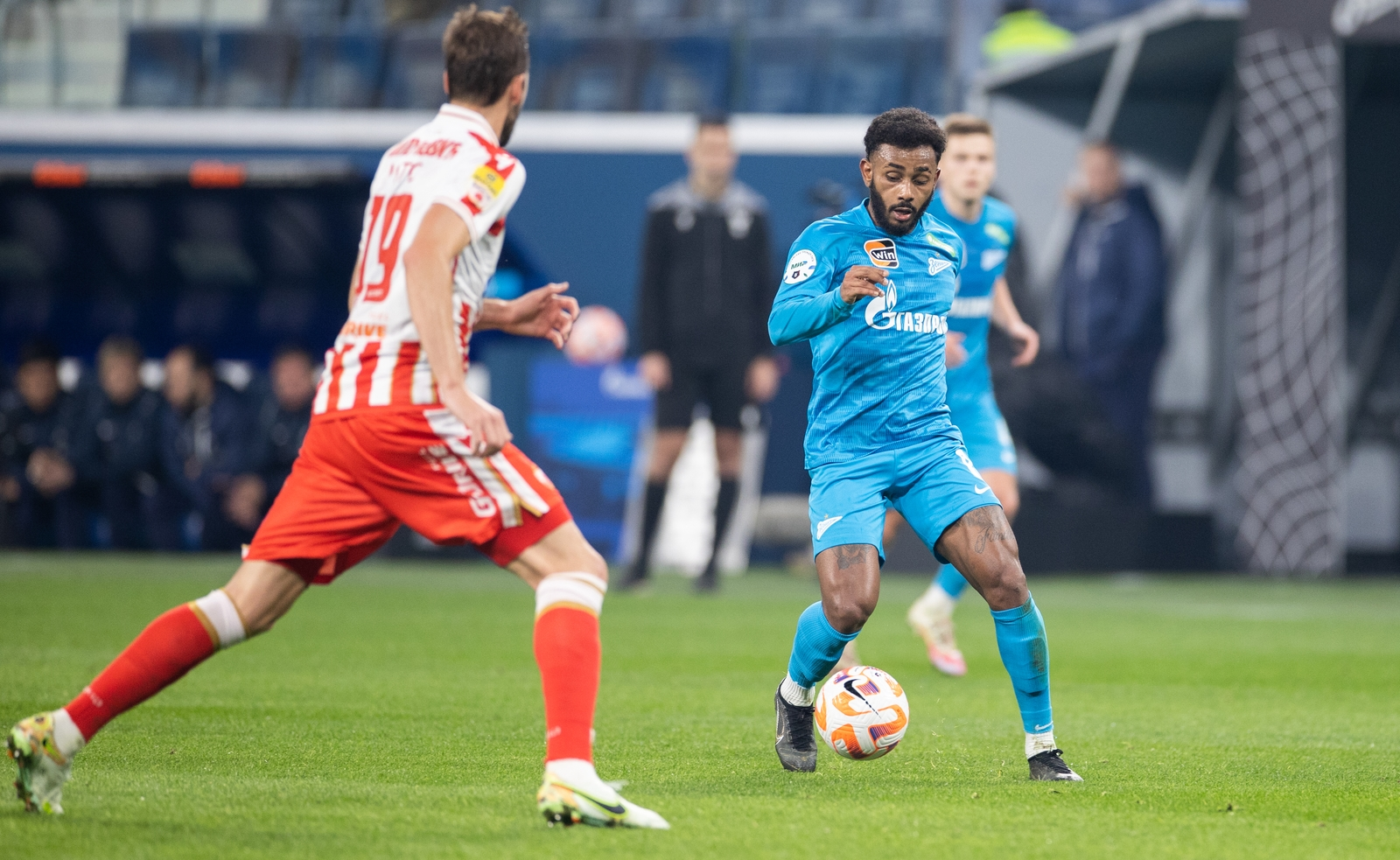
Milunović in action for Red Star Belgrade in 2022 against Zenit Saint Petersburg

After Milunović decided not to renew his contract with BATE Borisov, he signed a 2.5-year contract with Red Star Belgrade as a free agent in the 2018–19 winter transfer window. He played in Red Star's 2019–20 UEFA Champions League campaign under coach Vladan Milojević.

=== Alanyaspor ===
In June 2021, after his contract with Red Star expired, Milunović signed 2-year contract with Turkish side Alanyaspor.

== International career ==
Milunović made his first appearance for the Serbia national football team under coach Slavoljub Muslin in a 2-1 friendly win over Cyprus in November 2016. His fourth and final international was an October 2019 friendly match against Paraguay.

== Career statistics ==
=== Club ===
As of end of 2021–22 season

Club	Season	League		Cup		Europe		Other		Total	
Club	Season	Apps	Goals	Apps	Goals	Apps	Goals	Apps	Goals	Apps	Goals
Borac Čačak	2007–08	2	1	0	0	0	0	0	0	2	1
Borac Čačak	2009–10	2	0	0	0	0	0	0	0	2	0
Borac Čačak	Total	4	1	0	0	0	0	0	0	4	1
Mladost Lučani	2008–09	31	0	0	0	0	0	0	0	31	0
Mladost Lučani	2010–11	26	0	0	0	0	0	0	0	26	0
Mladost Lučani	2011–12	30	6	1	0	0	0	0	0	31	6
Mladost Lučani	2012–13	24	3	1	1	0	0	0	0	25	4
Mladost Lučani	2013–14	27	1	1	0	0	0	0	0	28	1
Mladost Lučani	2014–15	15	2	1	0	0	0	0	0	16	2
Mladost Lučani	Total	153	12	4	1	0	0	0	0	157	13
BATE	2015	23	2	5	0	12	1	1	0	41	3
BATE	2016	11	2	4	0	0	0	0	0	15	2
BATE	2017	20	2	3	0	11	1	1	0	35	3
BATE	2018	5	0	3	0	3	0	1	0	12	0
BATE	Total	59	6	15	0	26	2	3	0	103	8
Red Star	2018–19	12	0	4	1	0	0	0	0	16	1
Red Star	2019–20	20	2	2	0	13	1	0	0	35	3
Red Star	2020–21	22	4	4	1	10	1	0	0	36	6
Red Star	Total	54	6	10	2	23	2	0	0	87	9
Alanyaspor	2021–22	27	1	5	0	0	0	0	0	32	1
Career total		297	26	34	3	49	4	3	0	383	33

=== International statistics ===
Serbia national team
Year	Apps	Goals
2016	3	1
2017	0	0
2018	0	0
2019	1	0
Total	4	1

=== International goals ===
Score and Result lists Serbia's goals first

No.	Date	Venue	Cap	Opponent	Score	Result	Competition
1	31 May 2016	Karađorđe Stadium, Novi Sad, Serbia	2	Israel	2–1	3–1	Friendly

== Honours ==
Mladost Lučani

- Serbian First League: 2013–14

BATE Borisov

- Belarusian Premier League: 2015, 2016, 2017, 2018
- Belarusian Cup: 2014-15
- Belarusian Super Cup: 2015, 2016, 2017

Red Star Belgrade

- Serbian SuperLiga (5): 2018–19, 2019–20, 2020–21, 2022–23, 2023–24
- Serbian Cup (3): 2020–21, 2022–23, 2023–24
