= Stegersbach =

- Municipality
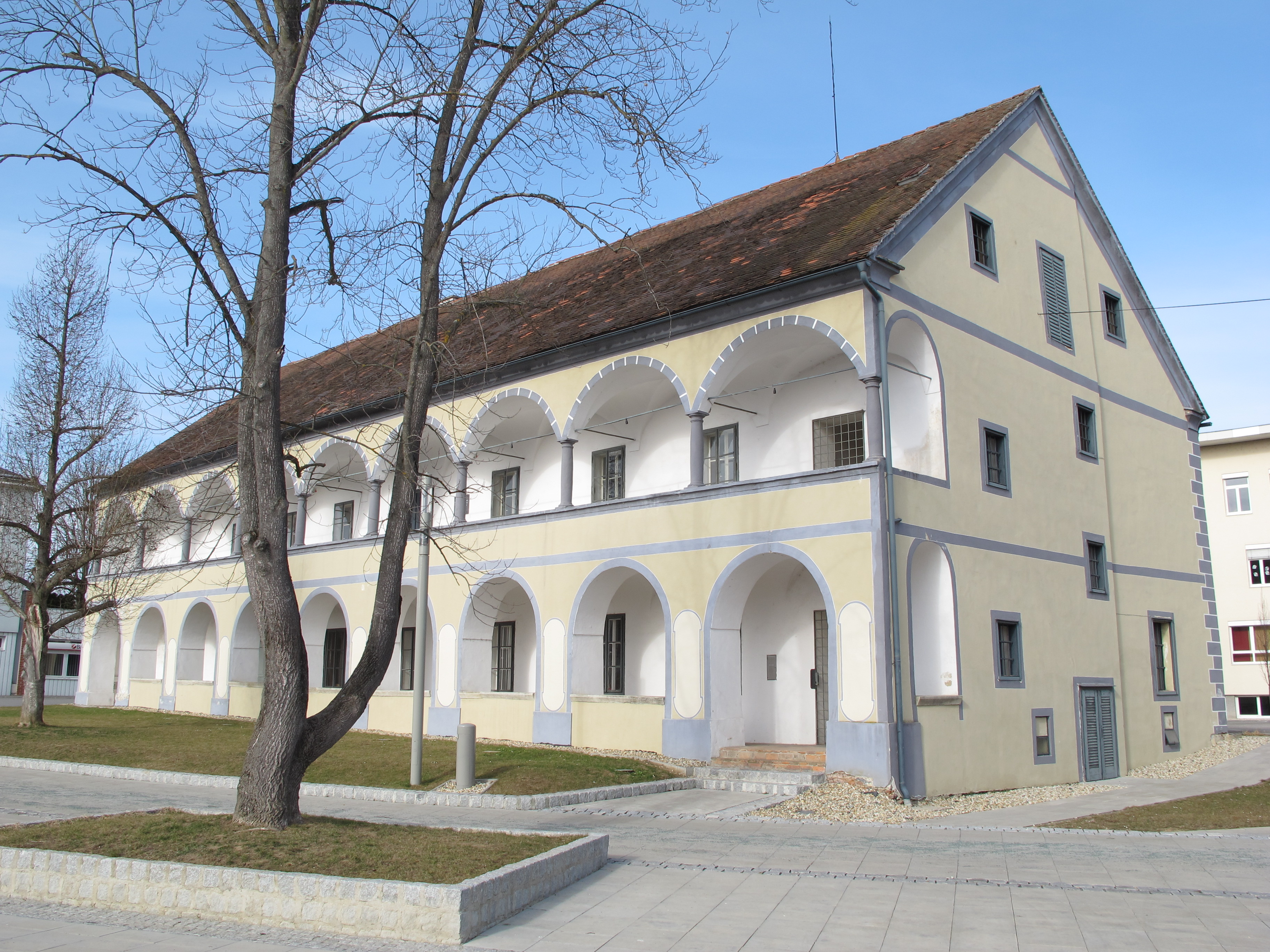
- The former Batthyány Castle

- Coat of arms

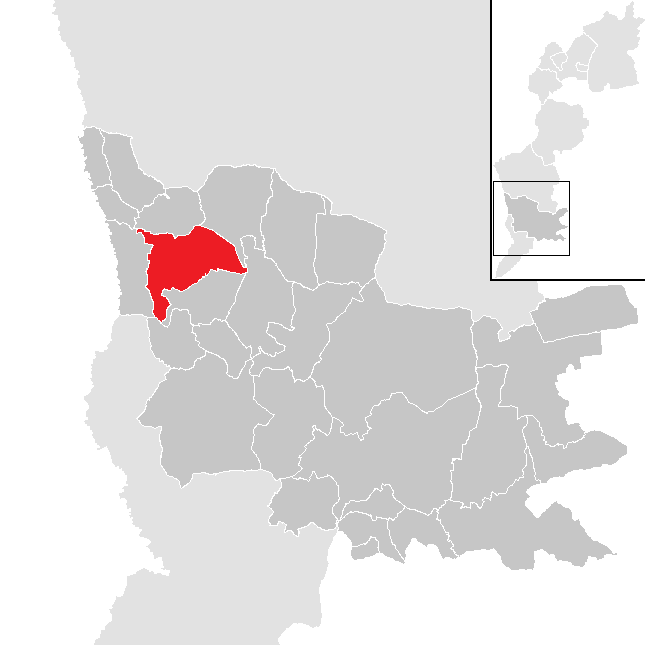
- Location within Güssing district

- Location within Austria Stegersbach (Austria)
- Coordinates: 47°10′N 16°10′E
- Country: Austria
- State: Burgenland
- District: Güssing

Government
  - Mayor: Jürgen Dolesch (SPÖ)

Area
  - Total: 17.77 km^{2} (6.86 sq mi)

Population (2018-01-01)
  - Total: 2,658
  - Density: 149.6/km^{2} (387.4/sq mi)
- Time zone: UTC+1 (CET)
  - Summer (DST): UTC+2 (CEST)
- Postal code: 7551
- Website: www.stegersbach.at

Stegersbach (Croatian: Santalek, Hungarian: Szentelek) is a town in the district of Güssing in the Austrian state of Burgenland.

== Geography ==
The municipality is located in southern Burgenland in the Stremtal valley. Stegersbach is the only village in the municipality. It is further divided into the hamlets of Fabitsgraben, Hinterfrauenberg, Kanischaberg, Pflegerhäuser (hamlets), Stegersbacher Berghäuser (scattered houses), and Steinbach (village).

== Population ==
Historical population
Year	Pop.	±%
1869	2,459	—
1880	2,745	+11.6%
1890	2,958	+7.8%
1900	2,977	+0.6%
1910	2,801	−5.9%
1923	2,573	−8.1%
1934	2,785	+8.2%
1939	2,576	−7.5%
1951	2,358	−8.5%
1961	2,507	+6.3%
1971	2,598	+3.6%
1981	2,494	−4.0%
1991	2,316	−7.1%
2001	2,380	+2.8%
2011	2,524	+6.1%

== International relations ==
Its twin town is Northampton, Pennsylvania.
