= Nikola Glišić =

Serbian football player

Personal information
- Full name: Nikola Glišić
- Date of birth: 30 June 1999 (age 27)
- Place of birth: Belgrade, FR Yugoslavia
- Height: 1.75 m (5 ft 9 in)
- Position: Right back

Team information
- Current team: IMT
- Number: 5

Youth career
- –2019: Radnički Obrenovac

Senior career*
Years	Team	Apps	(Gls)
2019–2021	IMT	49	(4)
2022–2024	Red Star Belgrade	0	(0)
2022–2024	→ IMT (loan)	65	(9)
2024–	IMT	75	(5)
- * Club domestic league appearances and goals as of 13 June 2026

Nikola Glišić (Serbian Cyrillic: Никола Глишић; born 30 June 1999) is a Serbian professional footballer who plays as a right back for Serbian club IMT.
