= Milomir Čvorić =

Serbian association football player

Personal information
- Date of birth: 17 January 2002 (age 24)
- Place of birth: Belgrade, FR Yugoslavia
- Height: 1.93 m (6 ft 4 in)
- Position: Defender

Team information
- Current team: Torlak Kumodraž

Youth career
- –2019: Red Star Belgrade

Senior career*
| Years | Team | Apps | (Gls) |
| 2019–2021 | Red Star Belgrade | 0 | (0) |
| 2019–2021 | → Grafičar Beograd (loan) | 1 | (0) |
| 2021–2022 | Mačva Šabac | 21 | (0) |
| 2022- | Torlak Kumodraž | | |
- * Club domestic league appearances and goals as of 19:53, 13 August 2021 (UTC)

Milomir Čvorić (Serbian Cyrillic: Миломир Чворић, born 17 January 2002) is a Serbian footballer who currently plays as a defender for Torlak Kumodraž. He has played for Mačva Šabac at Serbia's second level.

== Career statistics ==
=== Club ===
As of 13 August 2021.

| Club | Season | League | | | Cup | | Continental | | Total | |
| Club | Season | Division | Apps | Goals | Apps | Goals | Apps | Goals | Apps | Goals |
|---|---|---|---|---|---|---|---|---|---|---|
| Grafičar Beograd (loan) | 2019–20 | Serbian First League | 1 | 0 | 0 | 0 | – | | 1 | 0 |
| Mačva Šabac | 2021–22 | Serbian First League | 1 | 0 | 0 | 0 | – | | 1 | 0 |
| Career total | | | 2 | 0 | 0 | 0 | 0 | 0 | 2 | 0 |
