= Mateja Bačanin =

Serbian footballer

Personal information
- Full name: Mateja Bačanin
- Date of birth: 22 September 2003 (age 23)
- Place of birth: Smederevo, Serbia and Montenegro
- Height: 1.78 m (5 ft 10 in)
- Position: Attacking midfielder

Team information
- Current team: Smederevo
- Number: 22

Youth career
- –2021: Red Star Belgrade
- 2019: → Grafičar Beograd (loan)

Senior career*
Years	Team	Apps	(Gls)
2021–2022	Red Star Belgrade	0	(0)
2021–2022	→ Grafičar Beograd (loan)	14	(2)
2022–2023	Radnički Sremska Mitrovica	2	(0)
2023–	Smederevo	2	(0)

International career
2019	Serbia U17	5	(0)
- * Club domestic league appearances and goals as of 25 June 2025

Mateja Bačanin (Serbian Cyrillic: Матеја Бачанин; born 22 September 2003) is a Serbian professional footballer who plays as an attacking midfielder.
