= FK IMT =

Serbian football club

IMT
- Full name: FK IMT
- Nicknames: Traktoristi, Novobeogradski traktoristi
- Founded: 1953; 73 years ago
- Ground: Lagator Stadium, Loznica
- Capacity: 8,030
- President: Milenko Ostojić
- Head coach: Zoran Popović
- League: Serbian SuperLiga
- 2025–26: Serbian SuperLiga, 9th of 16
- Website: fkimt.com
Home colours	Away colours

FK IMT (Serbian Cyrillic: ФК ИМТ) and currently referred to as FK IMT MrBit (Serbian Cyrillic: ФК ИМТ МРБИТ) for sponsorship reasons, is a professional football club based in New Belgrade, Serbia. They compete in the Serbian SuperLiga, the top tier of the national league system.

== History ==
The club was founded by the agricultural machinery manufacturer of the same name in 1953. They won the Belgrade Zone League in the 1986–87 season and took promotion to the fourth tier of Yugoslav football.

After winning the Belgrade Zone League in 2014, the club earned promotion to the Serbian League Belgrade. They would compete in the third tier of Serbian football over the next six seasons. In the COVID-19-interrupted 2019–20 season, the club finished in first place and gained promotion to the Serbian First League, thus reaching the second tier for the first time in history. They eventually won the Serbian First League in 2023 and got promotion to the Serbian SuperLiga.

== Honours ==
- Serbian First League (Tier 2)
  - 2022–23
- Serbian League Belgrade (Tier 3)
  - 2019–20
- Belgrade Zone League (Tier 4)
  - 2013–14

== Seasons ==
Season	League									Cup
Season	Division	Pld	W	D	L	GF	GA	Pts	Pos	Cup
Serbia and Montenegro
2005–06	4 – Belgrade	34	12	9	13	44	37	45	10th	—
Serbia
2006–07	4 – Belgrade	34	13	8	13	43	39	47	10th	—
2007–08	4 – Belgrade	34	18	6	10	65	42	57	3rd	—
2008–09	4 – Belgrade	34	9	10	15	33	48	37	16th	—
2009–10	4 – Belgrade	34	10	8	16	34	54	38	14th	—
2010–11	4 – Belgrade	34	9	10	15	33	42	37	15th	—
2011–12	4 – Belgrade	34	9	11	14	35	51	38	17th	—
2012–13	4 – Belgrade	32	16	9	7	59	29	57	3rd	—
2013–14	4 – Belgrade	30	23	3	4	60	18	72	1st	—
2014–15	3 – Belgrade	30	17	0	13	40	41	51	3rd	—
2015–16	3 – Belgrade	30	14	6	10	42	35	48	6th	—
2016–17	3 – Belgrade	30	16	4	10	53	35	52	3rd	—
2017–18	3 – Belgrade	30	12	6	12	52	36	42	7th	—
2018–19	3 – Belgrade	30	22	4	4	65	22	70	2nd	—
2019–20	3 – Belgrade	17 (Note: The season was cut short due to the COVID-19 pandemic in Serbia.)	12	4	1	40	10	40	1st	—
2020–21	2	34	18	6	10	57	35	60	4th	Quarter-finals
2021–22	2	37	19	10	8	69	37	67	4th	Preliminary round
2022–23	2	37	22	9	6	63	36	75	1st	Round of 16
2023–24	1	30	9	5	16	34	47	32	12th	Round of 32
2024–25	1	30	10	7	13	37	46	37	10th	Round of 16

== Players ==
=== First-team squad ===
As of 19 September 2026

Note: Flags indicate national team as defined under FIFA eligibility rules; some limited exceptions apply. Players may hold more than one non-FIFA nationality.

No.	Pos.	Nation	Player
1	GK	ARM	Ognjen Čančarević
2	DF	ESP	Julián Delmás
3	DF	ESP	Iván Martos
4	DF	MNE	Blagoje Uzunovski
5	DF	MLI	Moussa Sissako
6	FW	SRB	Naum Perović
7	DF	SRB	Nikola Glišić
8	MF	SRB	Luka Luković
9	FW	SRB	Aleksa Mitić
11	FW	BRA	Rafael Juninho
12	GK	SRB	Kadir Gicić
14	MF	MLI	Ibrahima Kébé
15	DF	SRB	Aleksandar Sedlar
18	MF	BFA	Josué Tiendrébéogo
19	MF	SRB	Tadija Cojić
20	MF	SRB	Đorđe Radivojević
21	GK	SRB	Matej Pribišić

No.	Pos.	Nation	Player
22	MF	SRB	Vasilije Novičić (captain)
23	MF	GHA	Daniel Akrofi
24	DF	SRB	Luka Gutić
26	FW	SRB	Đorđe Jović
27	FW	SRB	Vladimir Radočaj
28	DF	SRB	Andrej Milanović
29	FW	MTQ	Karl Fabien
37	FW	NGR	Daniel Aghahowa
40	FW	GUI	François Kamano
45	DF	ESP	Ismael Casas
50	FW	SRB	Lazar Cvijetić
65	DF	SRB	Stefan Šapić
66	DF	SRB	David Urošević
94	FW	FRA	Vicky Kiankaulua
99	FW	FRA	Charly Keïta
—	DF	NGR	Sheriff Stowe

=== Players with multiple nationalities ===
- (Mali) (France) Moussa Sissako
- (Martinique) (France) Karl Fabien
- (France) (Democratic Republic of the Congo) Vicky Kiankaulua
- (France) (Ivory Coast) Charly Keïta
- (Armenia) (Serbia) Ognjen Čančarević

=== Out on loan ===
Note: Flags indicate national team as defined under FIFA eligibility rules; some limited exceptions apply. Players may hold more than one non-FIFA nationality.

No.	Pos.	Nation	Player
—	DF	SRB	Mateja Vukomanović (at Ušće Novi Beograd until the end of the 2026–27 season)
—	DF	SRB	Vukašin Radosavljević (at Proleter 023 until the end of the 2026–27 season)
—	MF	SRB	Leontije Vasić (at Loznica until the end of the 2026–27 season)

No.	Pos.	Nation	Player
—	MF	SRB	Nikola Krstić (at Al Kharaitiyat until the end of the 2026–27 season)
—	FW	SRB	Andrej Vuletić (at Ušće Novi Beograd until the end of the 2026–27 season)
—	FW	SRB	Miloš Bakić (at Loznica until the end of the 2026–27 season)

== Coaching staff ==
Current coaching staff
Position	Name
Head coach	(Serbia) Zoran Popović
Assistant coach	(Serbia) Pavle Ninkov (Serbia) Nikola Jovanić (Serbia) Nemanja Marković
Goalkeeper coach	(Serbia) Danilo Pustinjaković
Fitness coach	(Serbia) Miloš Šolaja (Serbia) Igor Pavičić
Doctor	(Serbia) Danilo Milić
Physiotherapist	(Serbia) Nemanja Vasović
Economist	(Serbia) Aljoša Aćić
Club representative	(Serbia) Miloš Knežević
FK IMT – Coaching staff:

=== Notable players ===
This is a list of players who have played at full international level.

- (Algeria) Ishak Belfodil
- (Algeria) Farid Boulaya
- (Algeria) Alexandre Oukidja
- (Armenia) Ognjen Čančarević
- (Burkina Faso) Josué Tiendrébéogo
- (Guinea) François Kamano
- (Ivory Coast) Sankara Karamoko
- (Kazakhstan) Aleksandr Zuev
- (Luxembourg) Olivier Thill
- (Mali) Moussa Sissako
- (Martinique) Karl Fabien
- (Montenegro) Marko Rakonjac
- (Serbia) Vladimir Lučić
- (Serbia) Đorđe Petrović
- (Serbia) Aleksandar Sedlar
- (Serbia) Alen Stevanović
- (Serbia) Jagoš Vuković

For a list of all FK IMT players with a Wikipedia article, see Category:FK IMT players.

== Historical list of coaches ==
- (Serbia) Srđan Blagojević (2014–2015)
- (Serbia) Dušan Đorđević (2015–2017)
- (Serbia) Nebojša Jandrić (2017–2018)
- (Serbia) Dušan Đorđević (2018–2019)
- (Serbia) Saša Stojadinović (2019)
- (Bosnia and Herzegovina) Boris Savić (2020)
- (Serbia) Zoran Rendulić (2020)
- (Serbia) Goran Vuković (2020)
- (Serbia) Nebojša Jandrić (2021)
- (Serbia) Ivica Šimičić (2021)
- (Serbia) Bojan Krulj (2021–2022)
- (Serbia) Zoran Vasiljević (2022–2023)
- (Serbia) Nebojša Jandrić (2023–2024)
- (North Macedonia) Milan Stojanoski (Jul 2024-20 Nov 2024)
- (Serbia) Zoran Vasiljević (Nov 2024–2025)
- (Serbia) Bojan Krulj (1 Aug 2025-Oct 2025)
- (Serbia) Zoran Vasiljević (7 Oct 2025- 11 Jun 2026)
- (Serbia) Zoran Popović (12 Jun 2026-)
