= 2022–23 Red Star Belgrade season =

Red Star Belgrade
2022–23 season
- President: Svetozar Mijailović
- Manager: Dejan Stanković (until 26 August); Miloš Milojević (from 27 August)
- Stadium: Rajko Mitić Stadium
- Serbian SuperLiga: 1st
- Serbian Cup: Winners
- UEFA Champions League: Play-off
- UEFA Europa League: Group stage
- Top goalscorer: League: Aleksandar Katai (17); All: Aleksandar Katai (19)
- Highest home attendance: League: 35,621 (28 May 2023 v Novi Pazar, R37); All: 47,731 (23 August 2022 v Maccabi Haifa, CL PO)
- Lowest home attendance: 4,085 (18 September 2022 v Napredak, R12)
- Average home league attendance: 13304
Home colours	Away colours	Third colours

The 2022–23 Red Star Belgrade season was the club's 17th in the Serbian SuperLiga and 77th consecutive season in the top flight of Yugoslav and Serbian football. The club participated in the Serbian SuperLiga, Serbian Cup, UEFA Europa League and qualifications for UEFA Champions League.

== Summary ==
=== Pre-season ===
The first signing for this season was Zambian international midfielder Kings Kangwa on a 4 year contract from Russian side Arsenal Tula.

Strahinja Eraković, who played for the club in the last two seasons and is a product of the club's youth academy, received his first international call up for Serbia for four games of 2022–23 UEFA Nations League in June. He made his debut on 2 June coming on as a substitute in a 0–1 loss against Norway in Belgrade.

Two international players received call ups to play for their national teams in 2023 Africa Cup of Nations qualification games - El Fardou Ben Nabouhane for Comoros and Kings Kangwa for Zambia.

Milan Borjan received call up for Canada for the Friendly and 2022–23 CONCACAF Nations League A matches against Panama, Curaçao and Honduras.

Miloš Gordić and Petar Stanić both received call ups for the Serbia U21 squad for a 2023 UEFA European Under-21 Championship qualification games against France and Faroe Islands.

Three first squad players (Andrej Đurić, Nikola Stanković and Nemanja Motika) as well as six players who are on the loan from the club received call ups for Serbia U19 squad to play in 2022 UEFA European Under-19 Championship Elite round qualification matches against Netherlands, Ukraine and Norway. All three first squad players later received call ups for 2022 UEFA European Under-19 Championship.

On 10 June, the club announced that they appointed club's former midfielder Marko Marin as chief of the scouting department. Marin, who played for the Red Star between 2018 and 2020, is a former German international footballer who retired from professional football this summer.

On 11 June, the club signed a new contract with Serbian defender Radovan Pankov. Pankov, who arrived at the club in 2019 from Radnički Niš, extended his contract with the club until summer of 2024.

On 13 June, the club signed a new contract with another Serbian defender Marko Gobeljić. Gobeljić, who arrived at the club in 2017 from Napredak Kruševac, extended his contract with the club until summer of 2024. On the same day club started their pre-season with medical checks on their home ground in Belgrade. Training camp will move to Zlatibor between 13 and 19 June 2022 and after that to Slovenia between 22 June and 3 July 2022.

On 17 June Serbian defender Milan Gajić left the club on a free transfer in order to join Russian powerhouse CSKA Moscow. Gajić spent last four seasons with the Red Star winning four league titles and two cups.

On 21 June, the club announced their second signing for this season - Ghanaian international winger Osman Bukari. Bukari arrived from Belgian side Gent for an estimated fee of around €2,000,000 and will be staying with the club until summer of 2026.

=== July ===
Red Star started their season in Serbian SuperLiga with a 4–0 home win against Radnički Niš in which five players made their debuts for the team. Kangwa and Bukari, who both arrived in the club during this season's summer transfer window, were both starters in this game and they managed to score one goal each. In the second half Leković, Lučić and Mustapha, who were all promoted from the youth squad at the start of this season, also made their debuts after they came in as a substitutes. In a third round 2–1 win against Mladost Lučani another two arrivals made their debut for the team. Both Stefan Mitrović and Aleksandar Pešić came in as a subs in the second half with Mitrović also scoring one goal. Lastly, in fourth round 6–0 win against Radnik Nemanja Milunović made his debut just a day after arriving at the club. In total Red Star played four league games during the July, winning all four of them and finishing at the top of the league by the end of the month.

On 13 July three more players from previous season left the club. Contracts were terminated with Italian defender Cristiano Piccini who arrived at the Red Star just six months prior and with French midfielder Axel Bakayoko who was part of the team for year and a half. Additionally, Serbian midfielder Petar Stanić also left the club on a six-month loan to the Serbian side Spartak Subotica.

On 18 July the club announced a new signing, Serbian under–21 international midfielder Stefan Mitrović who arrived from the Radnički Niš for a fee reported at €500,000. He signed four-year-long contract until summer of 2026.

On 20 July Red Star brought back Serbian striker Aleksandar Pešić. He arrived from Turkish side Fatih Karagümrük for an estimated fee of €800,000 and signed three-year-long contract until summer of 2025. Previously he played for the Red Star during the 2017–18 season during which he was league top scorer and won Serbian SuperLiga Player of the season award.

On 22 July Dutch forward Richairo Živković left the club on a free transfer after one season in which he played 14 games for the club and scored one goal. He later joined Dutch side Emmen.

On 27 July Canadian international goalkeeper and club's captain Milan Borjan extended his contract until summer of 2026. He joined the club in 2017 and won five consecutive Serbian SuperLiga titles and two Serbian Cup titles since then.

On 28 July another former player returned to the Red Star - Serbian defender Nemanja Milunović rejoined the club after spending one season at Turkish side Alanyaspor. Milunović signed two-years contract with the club.

=== August ===
Red Star started this season's European spell in third qualification round of the 2022–23 UEFA Champions League. Draw for this round was held on 18 July and it was determined that the club will play Armenian champions Pyunik who eliminated Luxembourgian champions F91 Dudelange in the previous round. It was the first time that Red Star played an official match against them. Red Star won 7–0 on aggregate. Winner of this pairing was drawn to play in a play-off round against Israeli champion Maccabi Haifa who previously eliminated Cypriot champions Apollon Limassol. This was the first time in the club's history that they played against a team from Israel. Maccabi Haifa managed to secure qualification to group stage after a 5–4 aggregate win and Red Star was transferred to the Europa League Group stage. This will be fourth time in club's history that they will play in the Europa League. On a draw held on 26 August club was drawn into Group H together with French side Monaco, Hungarian champions Ferencvárosi and Turkish champions Trabzonspor. This will be the first time in club's history that they will play against Monaco and Trabzonspor.

In Serbian SuperLiga Red Star played three matches, winning two and drawing in Eternal derby against their arch-rivals Partizan. Club had two more games scheduled for this month, but they were postponed due to club's European games. At the end of the month Red Star was at the top of the league, one point ahead of second placed Novi Pazar.

On 7 August club announced the transfer of a Georgian international defender Irakli Azarovi. The young full-back arrived from Georgian champions Dinamo Batumi for an estimated fee of €300,000 and signed a four-year-long contract. He became the first player from Georgia to play for Red Star.

On 11 August Russian midfielder Yegor Prutsev joined the club from Russian side Sochi. He signed a four-year-long contract.

On 12 August the club announced that it has extended the contract with Serbian international defender Strahinja Eraković until the summer of 2026. Eraković, who is a product of the club's youth academy, is a part of the club since 2020.

On 26 August, following club's elimination from Champions league Dejan Stanković, who was a head coach for three seasons, resigned from his position after winning three titles and two cups with them. He was succeeded by Miloš Milojević who previously worked as an assistant manager under Stanković between 2019 and 2021 after which he was appointed as a head coach of Swedish clubs Hammarby in 2021 with whom he won Svenska Cupen and Malmö in 2022.

On 28 August Serbian forward Milan Pavkov left the club to join the Saudi side Al-Fayha for an estimated fee of €1,000,000. Pavkov joined the club in 2017 and won four league titles and two cup titles during his tenure, playing 152 games and scoring 59 goals in the process.

On 29 August Malian international forward Kalifa Coulibaly joined the club on a free transfer, previously having played for a French side Nantes. He signed a one-year contract, with an option for the extension for another year. Coulibaly will be the first Malian player to ever play for the club. He made a debut for the club coming in as a substitute in Eternal derby against Partizan on 31 August.

On 30 August another forward left the club. Norwegian international Ohi Omoijuanfo moved to Danish side Brøndby for an estimated fee of €1,350,000. He arrived at the club at the start of this year and managed to score 24 caps and 12 goals, winning the double.

=== September ===
During the September, Red Star played three games in Serbian SuperLiga, winning two and drawing one. This extended their unbeaten spell to ten games since the start of the season. At the end of the month club was at the top of the table, one point ahead of second placed Čukarički.

Club also started their Europa League group stage. First two games were played against Monaco at home and an away game against Trabzonspor. Both of them were defeats, which brought the club to the bottom of the group table at the end of September.

Draw for the first round of Serbian Cup was held on 19 September. Red Star were drawn to play an away game against Mačva Šabac in a game that was played on 29 September. Red Star won 2–0 and qualified for the second round of the competition.

On 15 September, on the closing day of the transfer market, club announced the signing of a Serbian midfielder Srđan Mijailović from Čukarički. This will be Mijailović's second spell at the club. He arrived for an undisclosed fee, and signed three-year-long contract.

=== October ===
During the October, Red Star played six games in Serbian SuperLiga, winning all six of them. This extended their unbeaten spell to sixteen games since the start of the season. At the end of the month club was at the top of the table.

In Europa League group stage, the club played three games, winning against Ferencváros and Trabzonspor at home and losing to Ferencváros in an away game.

On 10 October, the club announced signing of a new three-year-long contract with Gabonese midfielder Guélor Kanga until summer of 2025.

On 11 October, the club returned Serbian youngster Jovan Mijatović from his loan spell at Grafičar Beograd. Mijatović, product of the club's youth academy, was loaned at Grafičar since June of this year during which he had 8 appearances and 5 goals for the senior squad.

On 19 October, the club announced another contract extension. Serbian midfielder Veljko Nikolić signed a new three-year-long contract until summer of 2025.

On 26 October, the club announced first signing for a winter transfer window. Serbian full-back Lazar Nikolić joined the Red Star from Javor and signed a contract until summer of 2025.

=== November ===
During the November club played last 3 games in the first half of Serbian SuperLiga. They won all three of them, extending their winning spell to eleven games and their unbeaten spell to nineteenth games since the start of the season. That secured them first position with ten points lead against second placed Partizan.

In Europa League club played their last group stage match against Monaco, which they lost 3–1. With that game they finished last in the group and were eliminated from this seasons European competitions.

In Serbin Cup club was drawn to play against Radnički Sremska Mitrovica in round of 16.

Three players were called-up to represent their national teams on 2022 FIFA World Cup. Milan Borjan represented Canada for whom he played all three group games conceding 7 goals. Strahinja Eraković got called-up by Serbia but failed to achieve any appearance. Finally Osman Bukari represented Ghana with two caps and one goal scored against Portugal.

=== December ===
On December 6, the club announced contract extension with backup goalkeeper Nikola Vasiljević. Vasiljević, who arrived at the club in 2019, spent last three seasons at multiple loans and is still set to make a debut for the club on the official match. He signed new contract until summer of 2026.

On December 23, the club signed a contract with Serbian international defender Uroš Spajić until summer of 2026. This will be his second spell at the club, after season 2012–13. He arrived at the club as a free agent, after leaving his previous club Kasımpaşa at the end of previous season.

=== January ===
Club organized mid-season training camp between 8 and 27 January in Turkey during which they played six friendly games.

On 9 January club announced signing of pre-contract with Nigerian international winger Peter Olayinka. Olayinka, who spent last five seasons with the Czech powerhouse Slavia Prague, will be joining the club on 1 July 2023 as a free agent on a three-year-long contract with an option for a fourth year extension.

On 16 January club announced departure of Comorian international winger Ben who will be joining Cypriot side APOEL on a free transfer. He arrived at the club five years ago from Olympiacos and in that time became one of the best scorrers and foreign players in club's history. During those five seasons he won five Serbian SuperLiga titles and two Serbian Cups, had 196 caps for the club in all competitions and scored 85 goals. Out of those 85 goals 15 were scored in international competitions, making him tied at the fifth place of club's top scorers in international competitions.

On 21 January Argentine defender Alex Vigo joined the club on a one year long loan from Argentine side River Plate. Red Star will have an option to buy out his contract.

On 31 January Ivorian midfielder Sékou Sanogo left the club to join French side Paris FC on the loan until the end of the season after which he will become free agent. Sanogo joined the club from the Saudi side Al-Ittihad in January 2020, first on loan and one year later in January 2021 on a permanent transfer. During the three years he spent at the club he had 99 appearances in all competitions, scored four goals and won three domestic league titles and two domestic cups.

=== February ===
After the restart of the season following the 2022 FIFA World Cup club played four games during this month drawing first against Vojvodina and winning remaining three. This extended their league unbeaten run to forty-seven games since 27 October 2021 and secured them top of the table with 13 points ahead of the second placed Partizan.

On 3 February another player left the club on a loan. Serbian midfielder Nemanja Motika moved to an Austrina side Austria Lustenau on a loan until the end of a season. On the same day club brought in new player, also on a loan. Montenegrin striker Marko Rakonjac arrived on a loan until the end of a season from Russian side Lokomotiv Moscow with an option to buy at the end of a season.

On 6 February Serbian defender Radovan Pankov and goalkeeper Zoran Popović left the club for Serbian side Čukarički on a half a season loan. Pankov arrived at the club three and a half seasons ago and had eighty league appearances and 2 goals, while Popović arrived at the club in summer of 2018 and had twenty five league appearances for the club. On same date club announced signing of pre-contract with New Zealand international defensive midfielder Marko Stamenic. Stamenic, who spent last three seasons with the Danish side Copenhagen, will be joining the club on 1 July 2023 as a free agent on a four-year-long contract.

On 7 February another player left the club. Ghanaian forward Ibrahim Mustapha left the club to join Austrian side LASK for an estimated fee of €500,000. He joined the Red Star youth squad in January 2020. After which he had loan spells at multiple Serbian clubs, and made a debut for Red Star first squad at the start of this season in which he made twelve league appearances.

On 9 February club terminated contract with Malian international forward Kalifa Coulibaly. He arrived at the club at the start of a season, but managed to have just seven appearances and one scored goal.

=== March ===
During the March Red Star played four games in Serbian SuperLiga, winning three games including Ethernal derby against their arch-rivals Partizan and drawing one. This kept them at the first place at the end of the month with a comfortable 18-point lead against second-placed TSC. This extended their league unbeaten run to fiftyone games.

In Serbian Cup club won round of 16 match against Radnički Sremska Mitrovica and was drawn to play quarter-finals against Napredak Kruševac.

=== April ===
During the April in Serbian SuperLeague club played six games, winning five and drawing in eternal derby against Partizan. They ended the month at the top of the table 24 points ahead of TSC with 4 games left to play. This extended their league unbeaten run to fiftyseven games, ensured their 9th title in Serbian SuperLeague and 34th domestic league title, and qualified them for the 2023–24 UEFA Champions League group stage.

=== May ===
During the May club played four games in Serbian SuperLiga, winning two and drawing two. With this they ended their championship run twenty-two points ahead of second placed TSC and without any defeat during the season. This was second time in club's history that they achieved a season without a defeat. This extended their league unbeaten run to sixty-one games

On 9 May Serbian defender Stefan Leković, product of the club's youth academy, signed a new four-year-long contract with the club that will keep him in the club until summer of 2027.

On 25 May club won their third straight Serbian Cup title in a row and 27th in total by beating Čukarički 2–1 in the final with Aleksandar Pešić scoring both goals. Previously they beat TSC in the semifinal 3–0 on 17 May.

On 18 May club announced that they will be parting ways with head coach Miloš Milojević at the end of this season. He was appointed as a head coach in the first half of this season, and won Serbian SuperLiga and Serbian Cup with them. On the next day the club announced that the head coach for the next season will be Israeli manager and former footballer Barak Bakhar. Previously he managed Israeli club Maccabi Haifa with whom he won last three Israeli Premier League titles and qualified for 2022–23 UEFA Champions League by eliminating Red Star in play-off round. Bakhar signed a three-year-long contract with the club.

== Players ==
Players and squad numbers last updated on 28 May 2023. Appearances include league matches only.
Note: Flags indicate national team as has been defined under FIFA eligibility rules. Players may hold more than one non-FIFA nationality.

No.	Name	Nat	Position(s)	Date of birth (age)	Signed in	Contract ends	Signed from	Transfer fees	Apps.	Goals	Notes
Goalkeepers
27	Nikola Vasiljević	(Serbia)	GK	24 June 1996 (aged 26)	2019	2026	(Serbia) Radnik Surdulica	€150k	4	0	
66	Jovan Miladinović ^{U21}	(Serbia)	GK	20 January 2007 (aged 15)	2022	2025	(Serbia) Youth academy	N/A	0	0	
82	Milan Borjan	(Canada)	GK	23 October 1987 (aged 34)	2017	2026	(Bulgaria) Ludogorets Razgrad	Free transfer	180	1	Captain
Defenders
5	Uroš Spajić	(Serbia)	CB	13 February 1993 (aged 29)	2022	2026	(Turkey) Kasımpaşa	Free transfer	19	1	
13	Alex Vigo ^{FGN}	(Argentina)	RB	28 May 1999 (aged 23)	2023	2023	(Argentina) River Plate	Loan	13	3	
15	Aleksandar Dragović	(Austria)	CB	6 March 1991 (aged 31)	2021	2024	(Germany) Bayer Leverkusen	Free transfer	66	4	
16	Irakli Azarovi ^{U21 FGN}	(Georgia (country))	LB	21 February 2002 (aged 20)	2022	2026	(Georgia (country)) Dinamo Batumi	€300k	20	0	
19	Nemanja Milunović	(Serbia)	CB	31 May 1989 (aged 33)	2022	2024	(Turkey) Alanyaspor	€250k	74	6	
23	Milan Rodić	(Serbia)	LB	2 April 1991 (aged 31)	2017	2025	(Russia) Krylia Sovetov	€250k	152	9	
25	Strahinja Eraković ^{U21}	(Serbia)	CB	21 January 2001 (aged 21)	2020	2026	(Serbia) Youth academy	N/A	79	0	3rd captain
44	Stefan Leković ^{U21}	(Serbia)	CB	9 January 2004 (aged 18)	2022	2027	(Serbia) Youth academy	N/A	12	1	
76	Lazar Nikolić	(Serbia)	RB	1 August 1999 (aged 22)	2022	2025	(Serbia) Javor	Free transfer	8	0	
77	Marko Gobeljić	(Serbia)	RB	13 September 1992 (aged 29)	2017	2024	(Serbia) Napredak Kruševac	€100k	116	10	
Midfielders
4	Mirko Ivanić	(Montenegro)	AM	13 September 1993 (aged 28)	2019	2025	(Belarus) BATE Borisov	€1.3m	131	44	
7	Nenad Krstičić	(Serbia)	DM	3 July 1990 (aged 31)	2021	2023	(Greece) AEK Athens	Free transfer	74	7	
8	Guélor Kanga	(Gabon)	AM	1 September 1990 (aged 31)	2020	2025	(Czech Republic) Sparta Prague	Free transfer	126	27	
10	Aleksandar Katai	(Serbia)	LW	6 February 1991 (aged 31)	2020	2024	(United States) LA Galaxy	Free transfer	146	80	Vice–captain
11	Osman Bukari ^{FGN}	(Ghana)	RW	13 December 1998 (aged 23)	2022	2026	(Belgium) Gent	€3m	29	12	
20	Kings Kangwa ^{FGN}	(Zambia)	CM	6 April 1999 (aged 23)	2022	2026	(Russia) Arsenal Tula	€1.5m	32	8	
22	Veljko Nikolić	(Serbia)	AM	29 August 1999 (aged 22)	2019	2025	(Serbia) Youth academy	N/A	61	9	
29	Yegor Prutsev ^{U21}	(Russia)	AM	23 December 2002 (aged 19)	2022	2026	(Russia) Sochi	€900k	10	0	
33	Srđan Mijailović	(Serbia)	DM	10 November 1993 (aged 28)	2022	2025	(Serbia) Čukarički	Free transfer	77	0	
45	Nikola Mituljikić ^{U21}	(Serbia)	RW	20 January 2003 (aged 19)	2023	2025	(Serbia) Youth academy	N/A	7	0	
55	Slavoljub Srnić	(Serbia)	RW	12 January 1992 (aged 30)	2020	2023	(Spain) Las Palmas	Free transfer	143	16	
80	Stefan Mitrović ^{U21}	(Serbia)	LW	15 August 2002 (aged 19)	2022	2026	(Serbia) Radnički Niš	€500k	32	5	
Forwards
9	Jovan Mijatović ^{U21}	(Serbia)	RW	11 July 2005 (aged 16)	2022	2026	(Serbia) Youth academy	N/A	12	1	
17	Marko Rakonjac	(Montenegro)	CF	25 April 2000 (aged 22)	2023	2023	(Russia) Lokomotiv Moscow	Loan	13	4	
72	Aleksandar Pešić	(Serbia)	CF	21 May 1992 (aged 30)	2022	2025	(Turkey) Fatih Karagümrük	€1m	63	36	

- Note: SuperLiga imposes a requirements on under-21 players (marked as ^{U21}) and foreign players (marked as ^{FGN}). There must be at least one ^{U21} and no more than four ^{FGN} players on the pitch at any time.

== Pre-season and friendlies ==
19 June 2022 Friendly	Jedinstvo (Serbia)	1–2	(Serbia) Red Star	Zlatibor, Serbia
	Đorđević 53'	Report	Mitrašinović 28' (o.g.); Srnić 54'	Stadium: Stadion Švajcarija

24 June 2022 Friendly	Bravo (Slovenia)	1–2	(Serbia) Red Star	Ljubljana, Slovenia
	Kramarič 14' (pen.)	Report	Živković 63', 90'	Stadium: Stožice Stadium; Referee: Rade Obrenović

27 June 2022 Friendly	Domžale (Slovenia)	1–1	(Serbia) Red Star	Ljubljana, Slovenia
	Durdov 29'	Report	Lučić 87'	Stadium: Stožice Stadium; Referee: Asmir SagrkoviŽivković

30 June 2022 Friendly	Koper (Slovenia)	1–0	(Serbia) Red Star	Kranj, Slovenia
	Kotnik 51'	Report

3 July 2022 Friendly	Zenit (Russia)	2–1	(Serbia) Red Star	Sochi, Russia
	Mostovoy 53'; Cassierra 74'	Report	Katai 80'	Stadium: Fisht Olympic Stadium; Attendance: 33,000

16 November 2022 Friendly	Rađevac Krupanj (Serbia)	0–2	(Serbia) Red Star	Krupanj, Serbia
14:00		Report	Krstičić 7'; Ben Nabouhane 20'	Stadium: Stadium Mirko Vasiljević; Referee: Nikola Đorđević

22 November 2022 Friendly	Zenit (Russia)	3–1	(Serbia) Red Star	Saint Petersburg, Russia
20:00 MSK (UTC+3)	Sutormin 61' (pen.); Yerokhin 68'; Mantuan 74'	Report	Mustapha 23'	Stadium: Krestovsky; Attendance: 17,515; Referee: Sergei Ivanov

15 January 2023 Friendly	Lechia Gdańsk (Poland)	1–3	(Serbia) Red Star	Antalya, Turkey
15:00	Gajos 39'	Report	Bukari 14'; Pietrzak 71' (o.g.); Kangwa 78'	Stadium: Calista Sports Center

19 January 2023 Friendly	Neftçi (Azerbaijan)	0–1	(Serbia) Red Star	Antalya, Turkey
15:00		Report	Motika 4'	Stadium: Calista Sports Center

21 January 2023 Friendly	Koper (Slovenia)	0–1	(Serbia) Red Star	Antalya, Turkey
15:00		Report	L. Nikolić 13'	Stadium: Calista Sports Center

22 January 2023 Friendly	Dinamo Tbilisi (Georgia (country))	2–3	(Serbia) Red Star	Antalya, Turkey
15:00	Omar 35'; Gonçalves 75'	Report	Pešić 31', 53'; Ivanić 75'	Stadium: Calista Sports Center

25 January 2023 Friendly	Ludogorets (Bulgaria)	3–2	(Serbia) Red Star	Antalya, Turkey
15:00	Thiago 9', 36'; Tekpetey 34'	Report	Ivanić 75'; Vigo 90'	Stadium: Calista Sports Center

27 January 2023 Friendly	Austria Lustenau	2–3	(Serbia) Red Star	Antalya, Turkey
9:00	Diaby 26' (pen.); Guenouche 53'	Report	Kangwa 40'; Leković 47'; Mitrović 81'	Stadium: Calista Sports Center

25 March 2023 Friendly	Alfa Modriča (Bosnia and Herzegovina)	0–6	(Serbia) Red Star	Modriča, Bosnia and Herzegovina
17:00		Report	Nikolić 14'; Prutsev 24', 70'; Mituljikić 44', 67'; Srnić 51'	Stadium: Stadion Dr. Milan Jelić

== Competitions ==
=== Overview ===
Competition	First match	Last match	Starting round	Final position	Record							
Competition	First match	Last match	Starting round	Final position	Pld	W	D	L	GF	GA	GD	Win %
Serbian SuperLiga	10 July 2022	28 May 2023	Matchday 1	Winner	37	30	7	0	96	19	+77	81.08
Serbian Cup	29 September 2022	25 May 2023	First round	Winner	5	4	1	0	10	2	+8	80.00
UEFA Champions League	3 August 2022	23 August 2022	Third qualifying round	Play off round	4	2	1	1	11	5	+6	50.00
UEFA Europa League	8 September 2022	3 November 2022	Group stage	Group stage (4th)	6	2	0	4	9	11	−2	33.33
Total					52	38	9	5	126	37	+89	73.08

Source: Competitions

=== Serbian SuperLiga ===
==== Season results summary ====
Overall								Home						Away					
Pld	W	D	L	GF	GA	GD	Pts	W	D	L	GF	GA	GD	W	D	L	GF	GA	GD
37	30	7	0	96	19	+77	97	16	3	0	58	10	+48	14	4	0	38	9	+29

==== Season results round by round ====
Round	1	2	3	4	5	6	7	8	9	10	11	12	13	14	15	16	17	18	19	20	21	22	23	24	25	26	27	28	29	30	31	32	33	34	35	36	37
Result	W	W	W	W	W	W	W	W	D	D	W	W	W	W	W	W	W	W	W	D	W	W	W	W	W	W	D	W	W	W	W	D	W	W	W	D	D
Position	1	1	1	1	1	1	1	1	1	2	1	1	1	1	1	1	1	1	1	1	1	1	1	1	1	1	1	1	1	1	1	1	1	1	1	1	1

W = Win; D = Draw; L = Loss; P = Postponed

==== Regular season league table ====
Pos	Team	Pld	W	D	L	GF	GA	GD	Pts	Qualification (Note: Teams will be split into two groups (Final A and Final B) after each have played 30 matches.)
1	Red Star Belgrade	30	26	4	0	81	14	+67	82	Qualification for the Championship round
2	TSC	30	18	8	4	52	22	+30	62	Qualification for the Championship round
3	Čukarički	30	19	5	6	56	31	+25	62	Qualification for the Championship round
4	Partizan	30	17	6	7	57	28	+29	57	Qualification for the Championship round
5	Vojvodina	30	14	12	4	47	27	+20	54	Qualification for the Championship round

Source: SuperLiga (in Serbian)
Rules for classification: 1) Points; 2) Head-to-head points; 3) Head-to-head goal difference; 4) Head-to-head goals scored; 5) Head-to-head away goals scored (if two teams tied); 6) Goal difference; 7) Goals scored; 8) Fair play ranking; 9) Draw.

==== Regular season matches ====
10 July 2022 1	Red Star	4–0	Radnički Niš	Rajko Mitić Stadium, Belgrade
20:00	Katai 3' (pen.); Kangwa 25'; Pavkov 31'; Bukari 47'	Report		Attendance: 16,274; Referee: Milan Mitić

16 July 2022 2	Red Star	5–0	Kolubara	Rajko Mitić Stadium, Belgrade
20:00	Katai 9'; Pavkov 15', 22'; Cvetojević 25' (o.g.); Kanga 45'	Report		Attendance: 10,174; Referee: Nikola Radaković

24 July 2022 3	Mladost Lučani	1–2	Red Star	Mladost Stadium, Lučani
21:00	Leković 79'	Report	Pavkov 14'; Mitrović 71'	Attendance: 7,000; Referee: Aleksandar Živković

29 July 2022 4	Red Star	6–0	Radnik	Rajko Mitić Stadium, Belgrade
21:00	Ivanić 12'; Kangwa 64'; Katai 71'; Pavkov 76'; Kanga 83' (pen.); Bukari 84'	Report		Attendance: 12,023; Referee: Marko Delibašić

20 October 2022 5	Vojvodina	0–2	Red Star	Karađorđe Stadium, Novi Sad
18:55		Report	Pešić 52'; Kanga 62' (pen.)	Referee: Miloš Milanović
Note: This match was originally scheduled to be played on 6 August, but was rescheduled due to Red Star's European qualifications matches.

13 August 2022 6	Red Star	4–0	Voždovac	Rajko Mitić Stadium, Belgrade
20:45	Pešić 3'; Bukari 8'; Ben 84'; Ivanić 88'	Report		Attendance: 9,132; Referee: Marko Ivković

10 November 2022 7	Čukarički	0–2	Red Star	Čukarički Stadium, Belgrade
18:45		Report	Katai 37'; Kangwa 84'	Referee: Srđan Jovanović
Note: This match was originally scheduled to be played on 20 August, but was rescheduled due to Red Star's European qualifications matches.

27 August 2022 8	Red Star	4–1	Javor	Rajko Mitić Stadium, Belgrade
20:30	Omoijuanfo 16'; Mitrović 74'; Ben 78'; Nikolić 90'	Report	Marčić 30'	Attendance: 7,551; Referee: Miloš Milanović

31 August 2022 9	Partizan	1–1	Red Star	Partizan Stadium, Belgrade
20:00	Natcho 56' (pen.)	Report	Bukari 26'	Referee: Milan Mitić

4 September 2022 10	Red Star	1–1	TSC	Rajko Mitić Stadium, Belgrade
20:00	Ilić 45' (o.g.)	Report	Jovanović 42'	Attendance: 5,881; Referee: Novak Simović

11 September 2022 11	Novi Pazar	1–2	Red Star	CaizCoin Arena, Novi Pazar
17:00	Lončar 6'	Report	Rodić 34'; Pešić 88'	Referee: Miloš Milanović

18 September 2022 12	Red Star	1–0	Napredak	Rajko Mitić Stadium, Belgrade
17:00	Pešić 88'	Report		Attendance: 4,085; Referee: Nenad Minaković

2 October 2022 13	Mladost GAT	0–4	Red Star	Karađorđe Stadium, Novi Sad
17:00		Report	Ivanić 12', 84'; Katai 70'; Kanga 87' (pen.)	Referee: Aleksandar Živković

9 October 2022 14	Red Star	3–0	Spartak	Rajko Mitić Stadium, Belgrade
15:30	Gobeljić 20', 37'; Kangwa 47'	Report		Attendance: 4,468; Referee: Nikola Đorđević

16 October 2022 15	Radnički 1923	0–1	Red Star	Čika Dača Stadium, Kragujevac
14:00		Report	Katai 75' (pen.)	Referee: Lazar Lukić

23 October 2022 16	Radnički Niš	1–2	Red Star	Čair Stadium, Niš
17:00	Marjanović 74'	Report	Pešić 68', 90'	Attendance: 6,000; Referee: Marko Ivković

30 October 2022 17	Kolubara	0–2	Red Star	Kolubara Stadium, Lazarevac
17:00		Report	Pešić 45'; Coulibaly 49'	Attendance: 3,000; Referee: Aleksandar Živković

6 November 2022 18	Red Star	2–0	Mladost Lučani	Rajko Mitić Stadium, Belgrade
15:30	Katai 13'; Ivanić 77'	Report		Attendance: 4,392; Referee: Momčilo Marković

13 November 2022 19	Radnik	1–2	Red Star	Surdulica City Stadium, Surdulica
13:30	Spasić 48'	Report	Katai 35', 90'	Attendance: 3,000; Referee: Nenad Minaković

4 February 2023 20	Red Star	1–1	Vojvodina	Rajko Mitić Stadium, Belgrade
16:00	Katai 28'	Report	Kabić 25'	Attendance: 20,118; Referee: Aleksandar Živković

11 February 2023 21	Voždovac	0–6	Red Star	Voždovac Stadium, Belgrade
14:00		Report	Kanga 14' (pen.); Bukari 19'; Katai 24'; Vigo 64'; Kangwa 77'; Ivanić 82'	Referee: Dejan Trifković

18 February 2023 22	Red Star	3–0	Čukarički	Rajko Mitić Stadium, Belgrade
15:00	Katai 14'; Bukari 17', 67'	Report		Attendance: 15,382; Referee: Stanko Ostraćanin

25 February 2023 23	Javor	0–2	Red Star	Javor Stadium, Ivanjica
14:00		Report	Pešić 38'; Mitrović 56'	Referee: Andrija Stojanović

3 March 2023 24	Red Star	1–0	Partizan	Rajko Mitić Stadium, Belgrade
19:00	Vigo 5'	Report		Attendance: 35,078; Referee: Aleksandar Živković

7 March 2023 25	TSC	1–2	Red Star	TSC Arena, Bačka Topola
18:30	Ratkov 70'	Report	Pešić 20', 46'	Referee: Miloš Milanović

12 March 2023 26	Red Star	5–1	Novi Pazar	Rajko Mitić Stadium, Belgrade
16:00	Rakonjac 11', 81'; Kanga 33' (pen.), 73'; Katai 77'	Report	Majdevac 25' (pen.)	Attendance: 17,843; Referee: Danilo Nikolić

19 March 2023 27	Napredak	1–1	Red Star	Mladost Stadium, Kruševac
17:00	Matić 85'	Report	Ivanić 38'	Referee: Milan Mitić

1 April 2023 28	Red Star	4–2	Mladost GAT	Rajko Mitić Stadium, Belgrade
18:00	Katai 18', 90'; Kanga 45+4' (pen.); Rakonjac 83'	Report	Vidakov 11', 33'	Attendance: 8,151; Referee: Stefan Jeknić

5 April 2023 29	Spartak	1–4	Red Star	Subotica City Stadium, Subotica
18:45	Shimura 8'	Report	Bukari 7'; Katai 23' (pen.), 82'; Kangwa 55'	Referee: Nikolić Danilo

10 April 2023 30	Red Star	2–0	Radnički 1923	Rajko Mitić Stadium, Belgrade
18:00	Vigo 6'; Mitrović 78'	Report		Attendance: 0 Referee: Delibašić Marko

==== Championship round league table ====
Pos	Team	Pld	W	D	L	GF	GA	GD	Pts	Qualification
1	Red Star Belgrade (C)	37	30	7	0	96	19	+77	97	Qualification for the Champions League group stage
2	TSC	37	22	9	6	66	32	+34	75	Qualification for the Champions League third qualifying round (Note: Due to Russian suspension, TSC were promoted from the second qualifying round to the third qualifying round.)
3	Čukarički	37	23	6	8	65	38	+27	75	Qualification for the Europa League play-off round (Note: Awarded to third place finisher since winner of the 2022–23 Serbian Cup, Red Star Belgrade, has already qualified for 2023-24 UEFA Champions League)
4	Partizan	37	21	8	8	68	34	+34	71	Qualification for the Europa Conference League third qualifying round
5	Vojvodina	37	16	15	6	59	35	+24	63	Qualification for the Europa Conference League second qualifying round

Source: SuperLiga (in Serbian)
Rules for classification: 1) Points; 2) Points in regular season; 3) Head-to-head points in regular season; 4) Head-to-head goal difference in regular season; 5) Head-to-head goals scored in regular season; 6) Head-to-head away goals scored in regular season (if two teams tied); 7) Goal difference; 8) Goals scored; 9) Fair play ranking; 10) Drawing of lots.
(C) Champions

==== Championship round matches ====
22 April 2023 31	Red Star	4–1	TSC	Rajko Mitić Stadium, Belgrade
18:00	Bukari 45', 62', 75'; Kanga 69'	Report	Đakovac 20' (pen.)	Attendance: 17,741; Referee: Srđan Jovanović

26 April 2023 32	Partizan	0–0	Red Star	Partizan Stadium, Belgrade
18:30		Report		Attendance: 0 Referee: Dejan Trifković

30 April 2023 33	Red Star	4–0	Čukarički	Rajko Mitić Stadium, Belgrade
17:00	Kangwa 6'; Rakonjac 19'; Mitrović 79'; Spajić 90'	Report		Attendance: 7,294; Referee: Stojanović Andrija

8 May 2023 34	Voždovac	0–2	Red Star	Voždovac Stadium, Belgrade
19:00		Report	Pešić 6'; Mijatović 72'	Referee: Ilić Pavle

13 May 2023 35	Red Star	2–1	Vojvodina	Rajko Mitić Stadium, Belgrade
18:30	Bukari 9'; Kangwa 90+4'	Report	Baraye 57'	Attendance: 8,258; Referee: Dejan Trifković

20 May 2023 36	Radnički 1923	1–1	Red Star	Čika Dača Stadium, Kragujevac
16:00	Zorić 86'	Report	Ivanić 84'	Referee: Nikola Đorđević

28 May 2023 37	Red Star	2–2	Novi Pazar	Rajko Mitić Stadium, Belgrade
19:00	Kanga 53'; Leković 71'	Report	Momčilović 60'; Stanojlović 75'	Attendance: 30,000; Referee: Novak Simović

=== Serbian Cup ===
==== First round ====
29 September 2022 R1	Mačva	0–2	Red Star	Gradski stadion Šabac, Šabac
16:00		Report	Milunović 48'; Kangwa 90+2'	Attendance: 4,900; Referee: Milan Ilić

==== Round of 16 ====
15 March 2023 R16	Radnički Sremska Mitrovica	1–3	Red Star	Stadium FK Radnički, Sremska Mitrovica
15:00	Djordjević 38' (pen.)	Report	Ivanić 43'; Rakonjac 56'; Kangwa 65'	Referee: Pavle Ilić

==== Quarter-finals ====
3 May 2023 QF	Napredak	0–0 (2–4 p)	Red Star	Mladost Stadium, Kruševac
18:30		Report		Referee: Milan Mitić
	Penalties
	Šarić (penalty scored); Kerkez (penalty missed); Đeković (penalty missed); Putinčanin (penalty scored)		Rakonjac (penalty scored); Azarovi (penalty scored); Ivanić (penalty missed); Mijatović (penalty scored); Bukari (penalty scored)

==== Semi-finals ====
17 May 2023 SF	TSC	0–3	Red Star	TSC Arena, Bačka Topola
18:30		Report	Kanga 35' (pen.); Ivanić 56'; Kangwa 72' (pen.)	Referee: Stanko Ostraćanin

==== Final ====
25 May 2023 F	Red Star	2–1	Čukarički	Rajko Mitić Stadium, Belgrade
21:00	Pešić 61', 76'	Report	Docić 21'	Attendance: 12,371; Referee: Milan Mitić

=== UEFA Champions League ===
==== Third qualifying round ====
3 August 2022 First leg	Red Star (Serbia)	5–0	(Armenia) Pyunik	Rajko Mitić Stadium, Belgrade
20:45	Bukari 29', 44', 70'; Kangwa 33'; Mitrović 77'	Report		Attendance: 40,456; Referee: Artur Soares Dias (Portugal)

9 August 2022 Second leg	Pyunik (Armenia)	0–2 (0–7 agg.)	(Serbia) Red Star	Vazgen Sargsyan Republican Stadium, Yerevan
19:00		Report	Kanga 44' (pen.); Pavkov 60'	Attendance: 6,000; Referee: Willie Collum (Scotland)

==== Play off round ====
17 August 2022 First leg	Maccabi Haifa (Israel)	3–2	(Serbia) Red Star	Sammy Ofer Stadium, Haifa
21:00	Pierrot 18', 51'; Chery 61'	Report	Pešić 27'; Kanga 39'	Attendance: 29,132; Referee: Carlos del Cerro Grande (Spain)

23 August 2022 Second leg	Red Star (Serbia)	2–2 (4–5 agg.)	(Israel) Maccabi Haifa	Rajko Mitić Stadium, Belgrade
21:00	Pešić 27'; Ivanić 43'	Report	Sundgren 45+5'; Pavkov 90' (o.g.)	Attendance: 47,731; Referee: Anthony Taylor (England)

=== UEFA Europa League ===
==== Group stage ====
Pos	Team	Pld	W	D	L	GF	GA	GD	Pts	Qualification	FER	MON	TRA	ZVE
1	(Hungary) Ferencváros	6	3	1	2	8	9	−1	10 (Note: Head to head points: Ferencváros 4, Monaco 1.)	Advance to round of 16	—	1–1	3–2	2–1
2	(France) Monaco	6	3	1	2	9	8	+1	10	Advance to knockout round play-offs	0–1	—	3–1	4–1
3	(Turkey) Trabzonspor	6	3	0	3	11	9	+2	9	Transfer to Europa Conference League	1–0	4–0	—	2–1
4	(Serbia) Red Star Belgrade	6	2	0	4	9	11	−2	6		4–1	0–1	2–1	—

Source: UEFA
Rules for classification: Group stage tiebreakers
Notes:

8 September 2022 MD1	Red Star (Serbia)	0–1	(France) Monaco	Rajko Mitić Stadium, Belgrade
21:00		Report	Embolo 74' (pen.)	Attendance: 40,226; Referee: Harm Osmers (Germany)

15 September 2022 MD2	Trabzonspor (Turkey)	2–1	(Serbia) Red Star	Şenol Güneş Sports Complex, Trabzon
18:45	Hamšík 16'; Trézéguet 68'	Report	Nikolić 89'	Attendance: 24,884; Referee: Sascha Stegemann (Germany)

6 October 2022 MD3	Red Star (Serbia)	4–1	(Hungary) Ferencváros	Rajko Mitić Stadium, Belgrade
18:45	Kanga 27' (pen.), 60'; Mitrović 35'; Katai 50'	Report	Zachariassen 71'	Attendance: 26,244; Referee: Lawrence Visser (Belgium)

13 October 2022 MD4	Ferencváros (Hungary)	2–1	(Serbia) Red Star	Ferencváros Stadion, Budapest
21:00	Zachariassen 23'; Mmaee 61'	Report	Mitrović 55'	Attendance: 20,675; Referee: Daniel Stefański (Poland)

27 October 2022 MD5	Red Star (Serbia)	2–1	(Turkey) Trabzonspor	Rajko Mitić Stadium, Belgrade
21:00	Katai 37'; Pešić 64'	Report	Bakasetas 39'	Attendance: 30,431; Referee: João Pinheiro (Portugal)

3 November 2022 MD6	Monaco (France)	4–1	(Serbia) Red Star	Stade Louis II, Monaco
18:45	Volland 5', 27', 87'; Rodić 50' (o.g.)	Report	Kanga 54' (pen.)	Attendance: 6,341; Referee: Serdar Gözübüyük (Netherlands)

== Squad ==
=== Squad statistics ===
No.	Pos	Nat	Player	Total		SuperLiga		Cup		Champions League		Europa League	
No.	Pos	Nat	Player	Apps	Goals	Apps	Goals	Apps	Goals	Apps	Goals	Apps	Goals
Goalkeepers
27	GK	(Serbia) SRB	Nikola Vasiljević	5	0	4	0	1	0	0	0	0	0
66	GK	(Serbia) SRB	Jovan Miladinović	0	0	0	0	0	0	0	0	0	0
82	GK	(Canada) CAN	Milan Borjan	47	0	33	0	4	0	4	0	6	0
Defenders
5	DF	(Serbia) SRB	Uroš Spajić	3	1	3	1	0	0	0	0	0	0
15	DF	(Austria) AUT	Aleksandar Dragović	44	0	32	0	3	0	4	0	5	0
13	DF	(Argentina) ARG	Alex Vigo	16	3	13	3	3	0	0	0	0	0
16	DF	(Georgia (country)) GEO	Irakli Azarovi	25	0	20	0	4	0	0	0	1	0
19	DF	(Serbia) SRB	Nemanja Milunović	31	1	20	0	2	1	4	0	5	0
23	DF	(Serbia) SRB	Milan Rodić	38	1	26	1	3	0	3	0	6	0
25	DF	(Serbia) SRB	Strahinja Eraković	47	0	33	0	4	0	4	0	6	0
44	DF	(Serbia) SRB	Stefan Leković	13	1	12	1	1	0	0	0	0	0
76	DF	(Serbia) SRB	Lazar Nikolić	11	0	8	0	3	0	0	0	0	0
77	DF	(Serbia) SRB	Marko Gobeljić	20	2	15	2	1	0	1	0	3	0
Midfielders
4	MF	(Montenegro) MNE	Mirko Ivanić	41	11	29	8	5	2	3	1	4	0
7	MF	(Serbia) SRB	Nenad Krstičić	5	0	4	0	1	0	0	0	0	0
8	MF	(Gabon) GAB	Guélor Kanga	43	16	30	10	3	1	4	2	6	3
10	MF	(Serbia) SRB	Aleksandar Katai	50	19	35	17	5	0	4	0	6	2
11	MF	(Ghana) GHA	Osman Bukari	42	15	29	12	4	0	4	3	5	0
20	MF	(Zambia) ZAM	Kings Kangwa	45	12	32	8	5	3	4	1	4	0
22	MF	(Serbia) SRB	Veljko Nikolić	13	2	9	1	1	0	0	0	3	1
29	MF	(Russia) RUS	Yegor Prutsev	11	0	10	0	1	0	0	0	0	0
33	MF	(Serbia) SRB	Srđan Mijailović	29	0	25	0	4	0	0	0	0	0
45	MF	(Serbia) SRB	Nikola Mituljikić	7	0	7	0	0	0	0	0	0	0
55	MF	(Serbia) SRB	Slavoljub Srnić	26	0	15	0	2	0	4	0	5	0
80	MF	(Serbia) SRB	Stefan Mitrović	43	8	32	5	3	0	3	1	5	2
Forwards
9	FW	(Serbia) SRB	Jovan Mijatović	17	1	12	1	3	0	0	0	2	0
17	FW	(Montenegro) MNE	Marko Rakonjac	17	5	13	4	4	1	0	0	0	0
72	FW	(Serbia) SRB	Aleksandar Pešić	40	16	28	11	3	2	3	2	6	1
Players transferred out during the season
1	GK	(Serbia) SRB	Zoran Popović	1	0	0	0	1	0	0	0	0	0
6	DF	(Serbia) SRB	Radovan Pankov	7	0	4	0	1	0	0	0	2	0
14	DF	(Serbia) SRB	Vuk Bogdanović	1	0	1	0	0	0	0	0	0	0
17	MF	(Serbia) SRB	Nemanja Motika	2	0	0	0	1	0	0	0	1	0
35	MF	(Ivory Coast) CIV	Sékou Sanogo	21	0	12	0	1	0	4	0	4	0
38	MF	(Serbia) SRB	Nikola Stanković	7	0	6	0	0	0	1	0	0	0
40	MF	(Serbia) SRB	Vladimir Lučić	2	0	2	0	0	0	0	0	0	0
9	FW	(Serbia) SRB	Milan Pavkov	7	6	4	5	0	0	3	1	0	0
18	FW	(Ghana) GHA	Ibrahim Mustapha	19	0	12	0	0	0	3	0	4	0
31	FW	(Comoros) COM	Ben	15	2	11	2	0	0	2	0	2	0
70	FW	(Mali) MLI	Kalifa Coulibaly	7	1	4	1	1	0	0	0	2	0
99	FW	(Norway) NOR	Ohi Omoijuanfo	2	1	2	1	0	0	0	0	0	0

Last updated: 28 May 2023
Source: Competitions

=== Goalscorers ===
Includes all competitive matches. The list is sorted by shirt number when total goals are equal.

As of 28 May 2023

Rank	Pos	No.	Player	League	Cup	Champions League	Europa League	Total
1	MF	10	(Serbia) Aleksandar Katai	17	0	0	2	19
2	MF	8	(Gabon) Guélor Kanga	10	1	2	3	16
2	FW	72	(Serbia) Aleksandar Pešić	11	2	2	1	16
4	MF	11	(Ghana) Osman Bukari	12	0	3	0	15
5	MF	20	(Zambia) Kings Kangwa	8	3	1	0	12
6	MF	4	(Montenegro) Mirko Ivanić	8	2	1	0	11
7	MF	80	(Serbia) Stefan Mitrović	5	0	1	2	8
8	FW	9	(Serbia) Milan Pavkov	5	0	1	0	6
9	FW	17	(Montenegro) Marko Rakonjac	4	1	0	0	5
10	DF	13	(Argentina) Alex Vigo	3	0	0	0	3
11	MF	22	(Serbia) Veljko Nikolić	1	0	0	1	2
11	FW	31	(Comoros) Ben	2	0	0	0	2
11	DF	77	(Serbia) Marko Gobeljić	2	0	0	0	2
14	DF	5	(Serbia) Uroš Spajić	1	0	0	0	1
14	FW	9	(Serbia) Jovan Mijatović	1	0	0	0	1
14	DF	19	(Serbia) Nemanja Milunović	0	1	0	0	1
14	DF	23	(Serbia) Milan Rodić	1	0	0	0	1
14	DF	44	(Serbia) Stefan Leković	1	0	0	0	1
14	FW	70	(Mali) Kalifa Coulibaly	1	0	0	0	1
14	FW	99	(Norway) Ohi Omoijuanfo	1	0	0	0	1
Own goals				2	0	0	0	2
TOTALS				96	10	11	9	126

=== Clean sheets ===
Includes all competitive matches. The list is sorted by shirt number when total clean sheets are equal.

As of 28 May 2023

Rank	No.	Player	League	Cup	Champions League	Europa League	Total
1	82	(Canada) Milan Borjan	19	2	2	0	23
2	1	(Serbia) Zoran Popović	0	1	0	0	1
2	27	(Serbia) Nikola Vasiljević	1	0	0	0	1
TOTALS			20	3	2	0	25

=== Disciplinary record ===
As of 28 May 2023

Rank	No.	Pos	Player	League			Cup			Champions League			Europa League			Total		
Rank	No.	Pos	Player	Yellow card	(yellow card) (yellow-red card)	Red card	Yellow card	(yellow card) (yellow-red card)	Red card	Yellow card	(yellow card) (yellow-red card)	Red card	Yellow card	(yellow card) (yellow-red card)	Red card	Yellow card	(yellow card) (yellow-red card)	Red card
1	23	DF	(Serbia) Milan Rodić	3	0	0	1	0	0	1	1	0	2	0	0	7	1	0
2	20	MF	(Zambia) Kings Kangwa	4	0	0	0	0	0	0	0	0	0	1	0	4	1	0
3	8	MF	(Gabon) Guélor Kanga	8	0	0	1	0	0	1	0	0	1	0	0	11	0	0
4	15	DF	(Austria) Aleksandar Dragović	4	0	0	0	0	0	3	0	0	3	0	0	10	0	0
5	25	DF	(Serbia) Strahinja Eraković	5	0	0	1	0	0	1	0	0	1	0	0	8	0	0
5	33	MF	(Serbia) Srđan Mijailović	7	0	0	1	0	0	0	0	0	0	0	0	8	0	0
5	72	FW	(Serbia) Aleksandar Pešić	4	0	0	2	0	0	0	0	0	2	0	0	8	0	0
8	10	MF	(Serbia) Aleksandar Katai	3	0	0	1	0	0	1	0	0	2	0	0	7	0	0
9	19	DF	(Serbia) Nemanja Milunović	4	0	0	1	0	0	0	0	0	1	0	0	6	0	0
10	11	MF	(Ghana) Osman Bukari	3	0	0	0	0	0	1	0	0	0	0	0	4	0	0
10	77	DF	(Serbia) Marko Gobeljić	4	0	0	0	0	0	0	0	0	0	0	0	4	0	0
10	80	MF	(Serbia) Stefan Mitrović	3	0	0	1	0	0	0	0	0	0	0	0	4	0	0
13	4	MF	(Montenegro) Mirko Ivanić	2	0	0	0	0	0	1	0	0	0	0	0	3	0	0
13	13	DF	(Argentina) Alex Vigo	3	0	0	0	0	0	0	0	0	0	0	0	3	0	0
13	35	MF	(Ivory Coast) Sékou Sanogo	1	0	0	0	0	0	0	0	0	2	0	0	3	0	0
13	55	MF	(Serbia) Slavoljub Srnić	2	0	0	0	0	0	0	0	0	1	0	0	3	0	0
17	16	DF	(Georgia (country)) Irakli Azarovi	2	0	0	0	0	0	0	0	0	0	0	0	2	0	0
17	18	FW	(Ghana) Ibrahim Mustapha	1	0	0	0	0	0	1	0	0	0	0	0	2	0	0
19	6	DF	(Serbia) Radovan Pankov	1	0	0	0	0	0	0	0	0	0	0	0	1	0	0
19	9	DF	(Serbia) Jovan Mijatović	0	0	0	1	0	0	0	0	0	0	0	0	1	0	0
19	22	MF	(Serbia) Veljko Nikolić	1	0	0	0	0	0	0	0	0	0	0	0	1	0	0
19	31	FW	(Comoros) Ben	1	0	0	0	0	0	0	0	0	0	0	0	1	0	0
19	38	MF	(Serbia) Nikola Stanković	1	0	0	0	0	0	0	0	0	0	0	0	1	0	0
19	82	GK	(Canada) Milan Borjan	1	0	0	0	0	0	0	0	0	0	0	0	1	0	0
TOTALS				68	0	0	10	0	0	10	1	0	15	1	0	103	2	0

== Transfers ==
=== In ===
#	Pos.	Player	Transferred from	Date	Fee
Summer
20	MF	(Zambia) Kings Kangwa	(Russia) Arsenal Tula	29 May 2022	Undisclosed (~ €1,500,000)
14	DF	(Serbia) Vuk Bogdanović	(Serbia) Rad	31 May 2022	Undisclosed
11	MF	(Ghana) Osman Bukari	(Belgium) Gent	21 June 2022	Undisclosed (~ €3,000,000)
–	DF	(Serbia) Blagoje Unković	(Serbia) Sloga Požega	7 July 2022	Free (Note: To youth squad.)
80	MF	(Serbia) Stefan Mitrović	(Serbia) Radnički Niš	18 July 2022	€500,000
72	FW	(Serbia) Aleksandar Pešić	(Turkey) Fatih Karagümrük	20 July 2022	Undisclosed (~ €1,000,000)
19	DF	(Serbia) Nemanja Milunović	(Turkey) Alanyaspor	28 July 2022	Free
16	DF	(Georgia (country)) Irakli Azarovi	(Georgia (country)) Dinamo Batumi	7 August 2022	Undisclosed (~ €300,000)
29	MF	(Russia) Yegor Prutsev	(Russia) Sochi	11 August 2022	Undisclosed (~ €900,000)
70	FW	(Mali) Kalifa Coulibaly	(France) Nantes	29 August 2022	Free
–	FW	(Nigeria) Khalifa Umar	(Nigeria) Future of Africa	29 August 2022	Free
33	MF	(Serbia) Srđan Mijailović	(Serbia) Čukarički	15 September 2022	Undisclosed
Winter
76	DF	(Serbia) Lazar Nikolić	(Serbia) Javor	24 October 2022	Undisclosed
5	DF	(Serbia) Uroš Spajić	(Turkey) Kasımpaşa	23 December 2022	Free
13	DF	(Argentina) Alex Vigo	(Argentina) River Plate	21 January 2023	Loan
17	FW	(Montenegro) Marko Rakonjac	(Russia) Lokomotiv Moscow	3 February 2023	Loan

=== Out ===
#	Pos.	Player	Transferred to	Date	Fee
Summer
3	DF	(Serbia) Srđan Babić	(Spain) Almería	5 June 2022	Undisclosed (~ €1,100,000) (Note: Was loaned to Almería in the 2021–22 season.)
51	GK	(Serbia) Andrija Katić	(Serbia) Voždovac	9 June 2022	Free (Note: Was loaned to IMT in the 2021–22 season.)
2	DF	(Serbia) Milan Gajić	(Russia) CSKA Moscow	17 June 2022	Free
	MF	(Serbia) Mihajlo Milosavić	(Serbia) TSC	19 June 2022	Free (Note: Played for the youth squad in the 2021–22 season.)
39	FW	(France) Loïs Diony	(France) Angers	30 June 2022	Loan return
	FW	(Serbia) Dejan Vidić	(Serbia) IMT	6 July 2022	Free (Note: Was loaned to Grafičar Beograd in the 2021–22 season.)
93	MF	(France) Axel Bakayoko	(South Korea) Cheonan City	13 July 2022	Free
24	DF	(Italy) Cristiano Piccini	(Germany) Magdeburg	13 July 2022	Free
	FW	(Bosnia and Herzegovina) Danilo Teodorović	(Serbia) Voždovac	19 July 2022	Free
34	MF	(Serbia) Aleksa Matić	(Belarus) Minsk	20 July 2022	Free
30	FW	(Netherlands) Richairo Živković	(Netherlands) Emmen	25 July 2022	Free
3	MF	(Kenya) Richard Odada	(United States) Philadelphia Union	1 August 2022	Undisclosed (~ €200,000) (Note: Was loaned to Metalac Gornji Milanovac in the 2021–22 season.)
	FW	(Serbia) Luka Marković	(Greece) Proodeftiki	25 August 2022	Free (Note: Was loaned to OFK Bačka in the 2021–22 season.)
9	FW	(Serbia) Milan Pavkov	(Saudi Arabia) Al-Fayha	28 August 2022	Undisclosed (~ €1,000,000)
99	FW	(Norway) Ohi Omoijuanfo	(Denmark) Brøndby	30 August 2022	Undisclosed (~ €1,350,000)
70	MF	(Austria) Srđan Spiridonović	(Lithuania) Kauno Žalgiris	16 October 2022	Free
Winter
–	DF	(Serbia) Milan Ilić	(Serbia) Javor Ivanjica	16 December 2022	Free (Note: Was loaned to Grafičar Beograd during the first half of the season.)
14	DF	(Serbia) Andrej Đurić	(Slovenia) Domžale	5 January 2023	Undisclosed (Note: Was loaned to Domžale during the first half of the season.)
14	DF	(Serbia) Vuk Bogdanović	(Serbia) Vojvodina	11 January 2023	Undisclosed
31	FW	(Comoros) Ben	(Cyprus) APOEL	16 January 2023	Free
18	FW	(Ghana) Ibrahim Mustapha	(Austria) LASK	7 February 2023	Undisclosed (~ €500,000)
70	FW	(Mali) Kalifa Coulibaly	Unatached	9 February 2023	Free

=== Loan returns and promotions ===
#	Position	Player	Returned from	Date
Summer
18	FW	(Ghana) Ibrahim Mustapha	(Serbia) Novi Pazar	1 July 2022
27	GK	(Serbia) Nikola Vasiljević	(Serbia) Napredak Kruševac	1 July 2022
40	MF	(Serbia) Vladimir Lučić	(Serbia) IMT	1 July 2022
44	DF	(Serbia) Stefan Leković	(Serbia) Grafičar	1 July 2022
9	FW	(Serbia) Jovan Mijatović	(Serbia) Grafičar Beograd	11 October 2022
Winter
45	MF	(Serbia) Nikola Mituljikić	(Serbia) Grafičar Beograd	1 January 2023
66	GK	(Serbia) Jovan Miladinović	Promoted from youth	1 January 2023

=== Loan out ===
#	Position	Player	Loaned to	Date
Summer
14	DF	(Serbia) Andrej Đurić	(Slovenia) Domžale	16 June 2022
93	FW	(Serbia) Ilija Babić	(Serbia) Mladost Novi Sad	17 June 2022
49	MF	(Montenegro) Andrija Radulović	(Serbia) Mladost Novi Sad	25 June 2022
40	GK	(Serbia) Stefan Marinković	(Serbia) Grafičar Beograd	28 June 2022
–	DF	(Serbia) Milan Ilić	(Serbia) Grafičar Beograd	28 June 2022 (Note: Loan extension.)
–	DF	(Serbia) David Petrović	(Serbia) Grafičar Beograd	28 June 2022
–	DF	(Serbia) Viktor Radojević	(Serbia) Grafičar Beograd	28 June 2022
–	DF	(Serbia) Uroš Lazić	(Serbia) Grafičar Beograd	28 June 2022
–	MF	(Serbia) Marko Ćurić	(Serbia) Grafičar Beograd	28 June 2022
–	MF	(Serbia) Filip Vasiljević	(Serbia) Grafičar Beograd	28 June 2022
–	MF	(Serbia) Jovan Šljivić	(Serbia) Grafičar Beograd	28 June 2022
–	MF	(Serbia) Jovan Mituljikić	(Serbia) Grafičar Beograd	28 June 2022
–	MF	(Serbia) Nikola Mituljikić	(Serbia) Grafičar Beograd	28 June 2022
–	MF	(Serbia) Mirko Nikolašević	(Serbia) Grafičar Beograd	28 June 2022
–	FW	(Serbia) Mateja Bubanj	(Serbia) Grafičar Beograd	28 June 2022
–	FW	(Serbia) Jovan Mijatović	(Serbia) Grafičar Beograd	28 June 2022
36	DF	(Serbia) Aleksandar Lukić	(Serbia) IMT	1 July 2022
–	DF	(Serbia) Nikola Glišić	(Serbia) IMT	1 July 2022
28	MF	(Serbia) Nikola Knežević	(Serbia) Grafičar Beograd	11 July 2022
21	MF	(Serbia) Petar Stanić	(Serbia) Spartak Subotica	13 July 2022
40	MF	(Serbia) Vladimir Lučić	(Serbia) Čukarički	29 July 2022
51	GK	(Serbia) Miloš Gordić	(Cyprus) AEK Larnaca	1 August 2022
32	GK	(Serbia) Marko Ćopić	(Serbia) Torlak	24 August 2022 (Note: Was loaned to Grafičar Beograd and Radnički Sombor in the 2021–22 season.)
11	MF	(Italy) Filippo Falco	(Italy) Cagliari	2 September 2022
29	MF	(Serbia) Mateja Bačanin	(Serbia) Radnički Sremska Mitrovica	9 September 2022
–	FW	(Bosnia and Herzegovina) Aleksandar Kahvić	(Israel) Maccabi Haifa	12 September 2022
Winter
49	MF	(Montenegro) Andrija Radulović	(Serbia) Radnik Surdulica	29 December 2022 (Note: Was loaned to Mladost Novi Sad during the first part of the season.)
–	DF	(Serbia) Uroš Lazić	(Serbia) Radnik Surdulica	29 December 2022 (Note: Was loaned to Grafičar Beograd during the first part of the season.)
38	MF	(Serbia) Nikola Stanković	(Serbia) Napredak Kruševac	4 January 2023
28	MF	(Serbia) Nikola Knežević	(Serbia) Napredak Kruševac	4 January 2023
70	MF	(Serbia) Jovan Mituljikić	(Serbia) Mladost Novi Sad	15 January 2023
35	MF	(Ivory Coast) Sékou Sanogo	(France) Paris FC	31 January 2023
17	MF	(Serbia) Nemanja Motika	Austria Lustenau	3 February 2023
1	GK	(Serbia) Zoran Popović	(Serbia) Čukarički	6 February 2023
6	DF	(Serbia) Radovan Pankov	(Serbia) Čukarički	6 February 2023

== See also ==
- 2022–23 KK Crvena zvezda season
