= List of Serbian football transfers winter 2022–23 =

This is a list of Serbian football transfers for the 2022–23 winter transfer window. Only transfers featuring Serbian SuperLiga are listed.

== Serbian SuperLiga ==
Note: Flags indicate national team as has been defined under FIFA eligibility rules. Players may hold more than one non-FIFA nationality.

=== Red Star Belgrade ===
In:

No.	Pos.	Nation	Player
5	DF	SRB	Uroš Spajić (free agent)
13	DF	ARG	Alex Vigo (on loan from (Argentina) River Plate, previously on loan at (Argentina) Independiente)
17	FW	MNE	Marko Rakonjac (on loan from (Russia) Lokomotiv Moscow)
76	DF	SRB	Lazar Nikolić (from Javor Ivanjica)

Out:

No.	Pos.	Nation	Player
1	GK	SRB	Zoran Popović (on loan to Čukarički)
6	DF	SRB	Radovan Pankov (on loan to Čukarički)
14	DF	SRB	Vuk Bogdanović (to FK Vojvodina)
17	MF	SRB	Nemanja Motika (on loan to Austria Lustenau)
18	FW	GHA	Ibrahim Mustapha (to (Austria) LASK)
31	FW	COM	El Fardou Ben (to (Cyprus) APOEL)
35	MF	CIV	Sékou Sanogo (on loan to (France) Paris FC)
38	MF	SRB	Nikola Stanković (on loan to Napredak Kruševac)
70	FW	MLI	Kalifa Coulibaly (free agent)
—	DF	SRB	Uroš Lazić (on loan to Radnik Surdulica, previously on loan at Grafičar Beograd)
—	MF	SRB	Nikola Knežević (on loan to Napredak Kruševac, previously on loan at Grafičar Beograd)
—	MF	SRB	Jovan Mituljikić (on loan to Mladost GAT, previously on loan at Grafičar Beograd)
—	MF	MNE	Andrija Radulović (on loan to Radnik Surdulica, previously on loan at Mladost GAT)
—	DF	SRB	Andrej Đurić (to (Slovenia) Domžale, previously on loan)
—	DF	SRB	Milan Ilić (to Javor Ivanjica, previously on loan at Grafičar Beograd)
—	MF	SRB	Mihajlo Avramović (to Dunav Prahovo, previously on loan at Leštane)

=== Partizan ===
In:

No.	Pos.	Nation	Player
13	MF	COL	Andrés Colorado (on loan from (Colombia) Cortuluá, previously on loan at (Brazil) São Paulo)

Out:

No.	Pos.	Nation	Player
36	MF	SRB	Nikola Terzić (on loan to (Turkey) Bandırmaspor)
50	FW	MNE	Marko Brnović (on loan to (Montenegro) Arsenal Tivat)
51	FW	SRB	Vanja Vlahović (on loan to (Italy) Atalanta Primavera)
97	MF	SRB	Aleksandar Lutovac (to (Austria) SV Ried)

=== Čukarički ===
In:

No.	Pos.	Nation	Player
8	MF	SRB	Luka Stojanović (from (Saudi Arabia) Al-Hazem)
12	DF	SRB	Radovan Pankov (on loan from Red Star Belgrade)
15	DF	SRB	Marko Gajić (from (Bosnia and Herzegovina) Borac Banja Luka)
16	DF	BRA	Richard (from (Brazil) Flamengo)
23	GK	SRB	Zoran Popović (on loan from Red Star Belgrade)

Out:

No.	Pos.	Nation	Player
13	DF	MNE	Nikola Vujadinović (to Mladost GAT)
44	MF	SRB	Nikola Petković (to (United States) Crown Legacy)
88	MF	SRB	Jovan Lukić (to (Austria) LASK)
—	MF	SRB	Andrija Fratrović (to (Greece) Irodotos, previously on loan at Trayal)

=== Radnički Niš ===
In:

No.	Pos.	Nation	Player
7	MF	SRB	Petar Mićin (from Napredak Kruševac)
8	DF	SRB	Nikola Andrić (from (Bosnia and Herzegovina) Borac Banja Luka)
23	MF	SRB	Nemanja Belaković (from (Latvia) Liepāja)
25	DF	SRB	Stefan Marjanović (from Kolubara)
31	DF	SRB	Boris Varga (from (Armenia) Pyunik)
99	MF	SRB	Lazar Pavlović (from (Cyprus) AEL Limassol)

Out:

No.	Pos.	Nation	Player
7	MF	SRB	Branislav Tomić (to (Bosnia and Herzegovina) Rudar Prijedor)
11	FW	SRB	Nikola Štulić (to (Belgium) Charleroi)
14	DF	SRB	Lazar Đorđević (free agent)
18	MF	JPN	Ryohei Michibuchi (free agent)
19	MF	GEO	Giorgi Papunashvili (to (Georgia (country)) Samtredia)
23	DF	SRB	Nikola Stajić (to (Greece) Panetolikos)
37	FW	SRB	Stefan Mihajlović (free agent)
43	DF	SRB	Andrija Marković (free agent)
93	DF	SRB	Nikola Aksentijević (free agent)
—	MF	SRB	Viktor Živojinović (on loan to Rad, previously on loan at Jedinstvo Ub)
—	DF	SRB	Luka Popović (to Železničar Pančevo, previously on loan at Timok)
—	FW	SRB	Strahinja Adamović (to Prva Iskra, previously on loan at Rad)

=== Voždovac ===
In:

No.	Pos.	Nation	Player
5	DF	SRB	Dušan Joković (from (North Macedonia) Akademija Pandev)
6	MF	SRB	Aleksa Matić (from (Belarus) Minsk)
7	MF	SRB	Vladan Novevski (from Vojvodina)
10	FW	SVN	Haris Kadrić (from Kolubara)
17	MF	SRB	Predrag Medić (from Radnik Surdulica)
24	DF	SRB	Damjan Daničić (from (Azerbaijan) Sumgayit)
44	DF	SRB	Vukasin Đurđević (from Rad)

Out:

No.	Pos.	Nation	Player
5	DF	MNE	Miloš Milović (to (Uzbekistan) Navbahor Namangan)
7	MF	JPN	Arihiro Sentoku (to (Montenegro) Iskra Danilovgrad)
10	FW	SRB	Veljko Trifunović (to Železničar Pančevo)
13	MF	SRB	Martin Novaković (to Mačva Šabac)
17	DF	SRB	Stefan Živković (to Sinđelić Beograd)
24	FW	SRB	Branislav Marković (to Metalac)
25	MF	SRB	Stefan Purtić (to (Romania) Petrolul Ploiești)
44	DF	SRB	Stefan Hajdin (to Železničar Pančevo)

=== Bačka Topola ===
In:

No.	Pos.	Nation	Player
7	MF	SRB	Milan Radin (from (Georgia (country)) Dinamo Batumi)
27	FW	HUN	Adrián Szőke (on loan from (Hungary) Diósgyőr)
40	DF	SRB	Dušan Cvetinović (from Radnički 1923)

Out:

No.	Pos.	Nation	Player
6	MF	SRB	Saša Tomanović (to Železničar Pančevo)
20	MF	SVK	Nikolas Špalek (to (Hungary) MTK Budapest)
50	GK	SRB	Nikola Bursać (on loan to Spartak Subotica)

=== Vojvodina ===
In:

No.	Pos.	Nation	Player
5	DF	SRB	Vuk Bogdanović (from Red Star Belgrade)
26	DF	SRB	Nemanja Ljubisavljević (from (Lithuania) Žalgiris)

Out:

No.	Pos.	Nation	Player
19	MF	SRB	Vladan Novevski (to Voždovac)
23	DF	SRB	Veljko Jelenković (to (Bulgaria) Slavia Sofia)

=== Napredak Kruševac ===
In:

No.	Pos.	Nation	Player
10	MF	SRB	Nikola Knežević (on loan from Red Star Belgrade, previously on loan at Grafičar Beograd)
16	MF	EST	Mark Oliver Roosnupp (from (Estonia) Levadia)
24	MF	SRB	Nikola Stanković (on loan from Red Star Belgrade)
22	FW	MNE	Marko Bojović (from (Montenegro) Grbalj)
27	FW	SRB	Uroš Ljubomirac (from (Malta) Balzan)

Out:

No.	Pos.	Nation	Player
10	MF	SRB	Srđan Kočić (to Kolubara)
16	MF	SRB	Petar Mićin (to Radnički Niš)
24	FW	SRB	Mlađan Stevanović (free agent)
44	MF	SRB	Uroš Rašković (on loan to Trayal)
77	MF	SRB	Nemanja Milovanović (to Meševo)
—	DF	SRB	Petar Pavlović (to OFK Beograd, previously on loan at Meševo)

=== Radnik Surdulica ===
In:

No.	Pos.	Nation	Player
21	DF	SRB	Uroš Lazić (on loan from Red Star Belgrade, previously on loan at Grafičar Beograd)
49	MF	MNE	Andrija Radulović (on loan from Red Star Belgrade, previously on loan at Mladost GAT)

Out:

No.	Pos.	Nation	Player
16	MF	SRB	Predrag Medić (to Voždovac)

=== Kolubara ===
In:

No.	Pos.	Nation	Player
7	MF	SRB	Srđan Kočić (from Napredak Kruševac)

Out:

No.	Pos.	Nation	Player
11	FW	SVN	Haris Kadrić (to Voždovac)
21	DF	SRB	Stefan Marjanović (to Radnički Niš)

=== Mladost Lučani ===
In:

No.	Pos.	Nation	Player

Out:

No.	Pos.	Nation	Player

=== Spartak Subotica ===
In:

No.	Pos.	Nation	Player
50	GK	SRB	Nikola Bursać (on loan from Bačka Topola)

Out:

No.	Pos.	Nation	Player

=== Novi Pazar ===
In:

No.	Pos.	Nation	Player

Out:

No.	Pos.	Nation	Player

=== Radnički 1923 ===
In:

No.	Pos.	Nation	Player

Out:

No.	Pos.	Nation	Player
40	DF	SRB	Dušan Cvetinović (to Bačka Topola)

=== Mladost GAT ===
In:

No.	Pos.	Nation	Player
20	MF	SRB	Jovan Mituljikić (on loan from Red Star Belgrade, previously on loan at Grafičar Beograd)
31	DF	MNE	Nikola Vujadinović (from Čukarički)

Out:

No.	Pos.	Nation	Player
49	MF	MNE	Andrija Radulović (loan return to Red Star Belgrade)

=== Javor Ivanjica ===
In:

No.	Pos.	Nation	Player
2	DF	SRB	Milan Ilić (from Red Star Belgrade, previously on loan at Grafičar Beograd)

Out:

No.	Pos.	Nation	Player
7	DF	SRB	Lazar Nikolić (to Red Star Belgrade)

== See also ==
- 2022–23 Serbian SuperLiga
