= Prutsev =

Prutsev (Russian: Пруцев) is a surname of Slavic-language origin. Notable people with this surname include:

- Danil Prutsev (born 2000), Russian footballer
- Yegor Prutsev (born 2002), Russian footballer
