= Stefan Mitrović =

Stefan Mitrović may refer to:

- Stefan Mitrović (water polo) (born 1988), Serbian water polo player
- Stefan Mitrović (footballer, born 1990), Serbian football centre-back for Gent
- Stefan Mitrović (footballer, born 2002), Serbian football attacking midfielder for Excelsior Rotterdam
