= Stefan Leković =

Serbian footballer (born 2004)

Stefan Leković Стефан Лековић
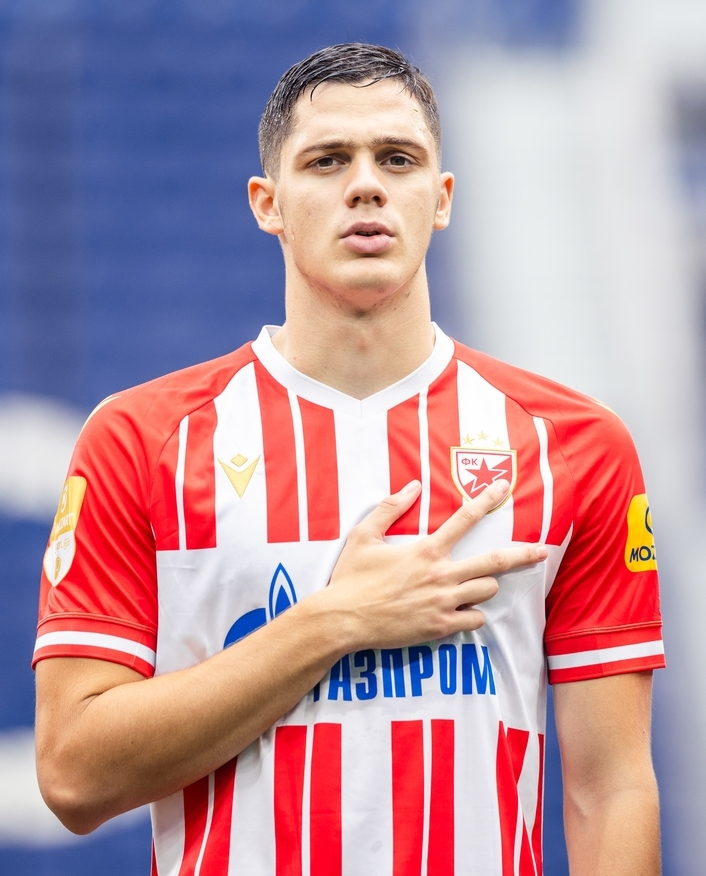
- Leković with Red Star Belgrade in 2024

Personal information
- Date of birth: 9 January 2004 (age 22)
- Place of birth: Belgrade, Serbia and Montenegro
- Height: 1.92 m (6 ft 4 in)
- Position: Centre-back

Team information
- Current team: Estrela da Amadora
- Number: 5

Youth career
- –2022: Red Star Belgrade

Senior career*
Years	Team	Apps	(Gls)
2022–2026	Red Star Belgrade	36	(3)
2022	→ Grafičar (loan)	16	(0)
2023–2024	→ Villarreal B (loan)	29	(3)
2024	→ Villarreal (loan)	1	(0)
2025	→ Monza (loan)	7	(0)
2026	→ Estrela da Amadora (loan)	9	(2)
2026–	Estrela da Amadora	0	(0)

International career^{‡}
2022–2023	Serbia U19	15	(3)
2023–	Serbia U21	7	(0)
- * Club domestic league appearances and goals as of 20 December 2025 ‡ National team caps and goals as of 4 June 2025

Stefan Leković (Serbian Cyrillic: Стефан Лековић; born 9 January 2004) is a Serbian professional footballer who plays as a centre-back for and captains Primeira Liga club Estrela da Amadora.

== Club career ==
Born in Belgrade, Leković was a Red Star Belgrade youth graduate. He was loaned to Grafičar in January 2022, before returning to Red Star for the 2022–23 season.

On 1 September 2023, Leković moved abroad and joined Villarreal's B-team on a one-year loan deal, with a buyout clause. He was called up to Villarreal's senior team on several occasions during the loan, and made his La Liga debut on 3 March 2024 in a 5–2 victory over Granada.

On 17 January 2025, Leković joined Italian Serie A club Monza on loan with an option to buy and a conditional obligation to buy.

== Career statistics ==
As of match played 20 December 2025

Appearances and goals by club, season and competition
Club	Season	League			National cup		Europe		Other		Total	
Club	Season	Division	Apps	Goals	Apps	Goals	Apps	Goals	Apps	Goals	Apps	Goals
Red Star Belgrade	2021–22	Serbian SuperLiga	0	0	0	0	0	0	—		0	0
Red Star Belgrade	2022–23	Serbian SuperLiga	12	1	1	0	0	0	—		13	1
Red Star Belgrade	2024–25	Serbian SuperLiga	9	1	0	0	0	0	—		9	1
Red Star Belgrade	2025–26	Serbian SuperLiga	15	1	0	0	1 (Note: One appearance in UEFA Champions League)	0	—		16	1
Red Star Belgrade	Total		36	3	1	0	1	0	—		38	3
Grafičar Beograd (loan)	2021–22	Serbian First League	16	0	—		—		—		16	0
Villarreal (loan)	2023–24	La Liga	1	0	1	0	—		—		2	0
Villarreal B (loan)	2023–24	Segunda División	29	3	—		—		—		29	3
Monza (loan)	2024–25	Serie A	7	0	—		—		—		7	0
Career total			89	6	2	0	1	0	0	0	92	6

== Honours ==
Red Star Belgrade

- Serbian SuperLiga: 2022–23
- Serbian Cup: 2022–23
