= Ibrahim Mustapha (Ghanaian footballer) =

Ghanaian footballer (born 2000)

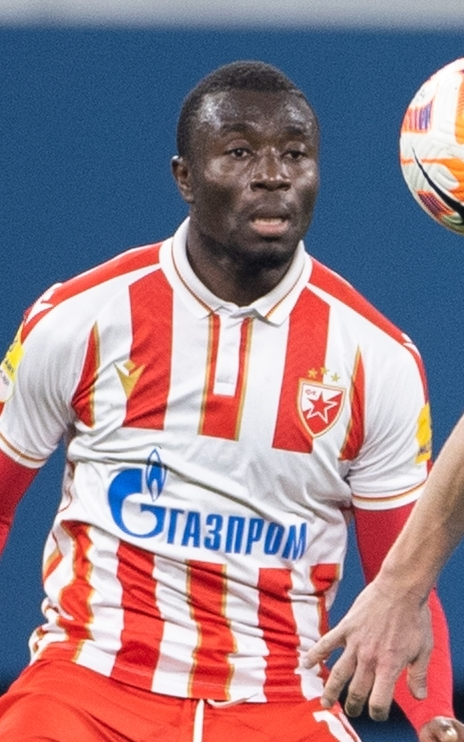
- Mustapha in 2022

Personal information
- Date of birth: 18 June 2000 (age 26)
- Place of birth: Tamale, Ghana
- Height: 1.80 m (5 ft 11 in)
- Position: Forward

Team information
- Current team: Radnički Niš
- Number: 23

Senior career*
Years	Team	Apps	(Gls)
2018–2020	EurAfrica		
2020–2023	Red Star Belgrade	12	(0)
2020	→ Zlatibor Čajetina (loan)	5	(0)
2021	→ Radnički Sremska Mitrovica (loan)	32	(9)
2022	→ Novi Pazar (loan)	15	(4)
2023–2025	LASK	32	(4)
2024	→ LASK II	1	(0)
2025–	Vojvodina	10	(1)
2026–	→ Radnički Niš (loan)	24	(3)
- * Club domestic league appearances and goals as of 28 October 2026

Ibrahim Mustapha (born 18 June 2000) is a Ghanaian professional footballer who plays as a forward for Serbian SuperLiga club Radnički Niš, on loan from another Serbian SuperLiga club Vojvodina.

== Career ==
On 15 February 2022, Mustapha joined Novi Pazar on loan from Red Star Belgrade for the second part of the 2021–22 season.

== Career statistics ==
As of 28 October 2026

Appearances and goals by club, season and competition
Club	Season	League			Cup		Europe		Other		Total	
Club	Season	Division	Apps	Goals	Apps	Goals	Apps	Goals	Apps	Goals	Apps	Goals
Red Star Belgrade	2020–21	Serbian SuperLiga	0	0	0	0	0	0	0	0	0	0
Red Star Belgrade	2022–23	Serbian SuperLiga	12	0	0	0	7 (Note: Three appearances in UEFA Champions League, four appearances in UEFA Europa League)	0	—		19	0
Red Star Belgrade	Total		12	0	0	0	7	0	0	0	19	0
Zlatibor Čajetina (loan)	2020–21	Serbian SuperLiga	5	0	—		—		—		5	0
Radnički Sremska Mitrovica (loan)	2020–21	Serbian First League	13	2	0	0	—		—		13	2
Radnički Sremska Mitrovica (loan)	2021–22	Serbian First League	19	7	1	0	—		—		20	7
Radnički Sremska Mitrovica (loan)	Total		32	9	1	0	—		—		33	9
Novi Pazar (loan)	2021–22	Serbian SuperLiga	15	4	1	0	—		2 (Note: Appearance(s) in play-offs)	0	18	4
LASK	2022–23	Austrian Bundesliga	15	3	1	0	—		—		16	3
LASK	2023–24	Austrian Bundesliga	10	0	3	1	7 (Note: Appearance(s) in UEFA Europa League)	0	—		20	1
LASK	2024–25	Austrian Bundesliga	7	1	2	0	0	0	—		9	1
LASK	Total		32	4	6	1	7	0	—		45	5
LASK II	2024–25	Regionalliga Mitte	1	0	—		—		—		1	0
Vojvodina	2025–26	Serbian SuperLiga	10	1	1	0	—		—		11	1
Vojvodina	2026–27	Serbian SuperLiga	0	0	0	0	—		—		0	0
Vojvodina	Total		10	1	1	0	—		—		11	1
Radnički Niš (loan)	2025–26	Serbian SuperLiga	14	2	—		—		—		14	2
Radnički Niš (loan)	2026–27	Serbian SuperLiga	10	1	0	0	—		—		10	1
Radnički Niš (loan)	Total		24	3	0	0	—		—		24	3
Career total			133	21	9	1	14	0	2	0	158	22
