= Nikola Mituljikić =

Serbian footballer (born 2003)

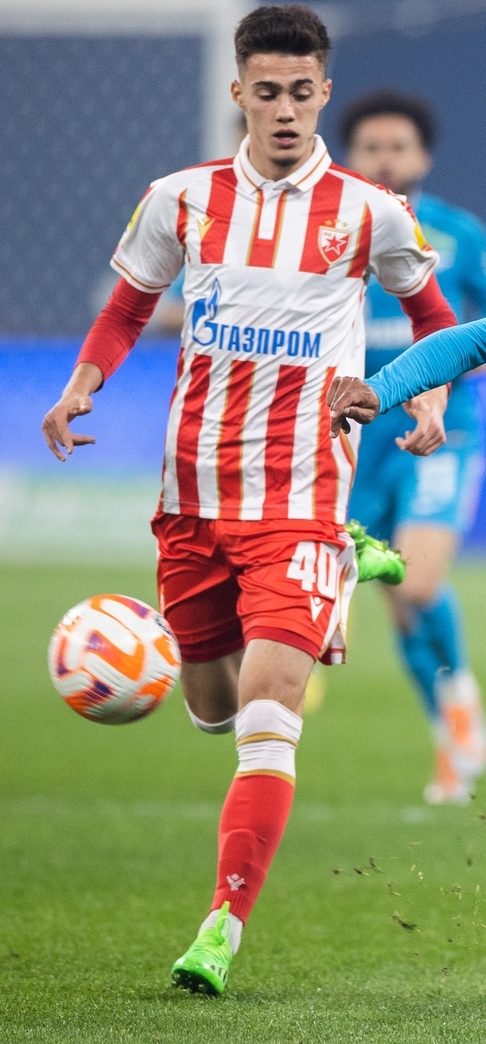

Personal information
- Date of birth: 20 January 2003 (age 23)
- Place of birth: Negotin, FR Yugoslavia
- Height: 1.80 m (5 ft 11 in)
- Position: Right winger

Team information
- Current team: Zulte Waregem
- Number: 7

Youth career
- –2021: Red Star Belgrade

Senior career*
Years	Team	Apps	(Gls)
2021–2025	Red Star Belgrade	9	(0)
2021–2022	→ Grafičar (loan)	39	(7)
2023–2024	→ OFK Beograd (dual)	30	(8)
2024–2025	→ OFK Beograd (loan)	31	(4)
2025	OFK Beograd	3	(2)
2025–	Zulte Waregem	2	(0)

International career^{‡}
2021–2022	Serbia U19	10	(2)
- * Club domestic league appearances and goals as of 9 February 2026 ‡ National team caps and goals as of 7 June 2022

Nikola Mituljikić (Serbian Cyrillic: Никола Митуљикић; born 20 January 2003) is a Serbian professional footballer who plays as a right winger for Belgian Pro League club Zulte Waregem.

== Club career ==
Mituljikić is a graduate player of the Red Star Belgrade club. In 2021, Nikola began playing for the reserve team. On 2 April 2023, in a match against Mladost Novi Sad, he made his debut in the Serbian SuperLiga. In his debut season, Nikola became the champion and won the Serbian Cup. In the summer of the same year, Mituljikić moved to OFK Beograd on loan. On 13 August, in a match against Metalac Gornji Milanovac, he made his debut in the Serbian First League for his new team. On 20 August, in a match against Jedinstvo Ub, Nikola scored a double, scoring his first goals for OFK Beograd.

On 14 August 2025, Mituljikić signed a three-year contract with Zulte Waregem in Belgium.

== Personal life ==
Nikola's twin brother Jovan is also a professional footballer.

== International career ==
Nikola played for the Serbian U19 national team.

== Honours ==
Red Star Belgrade

- Serbian SuperLiga: 2022–23, 2023–24
- Serbian Cup: 2022–23, 2023–24
