= Stefan Mitrović (footballer, born 2002) =

Serbian footballer

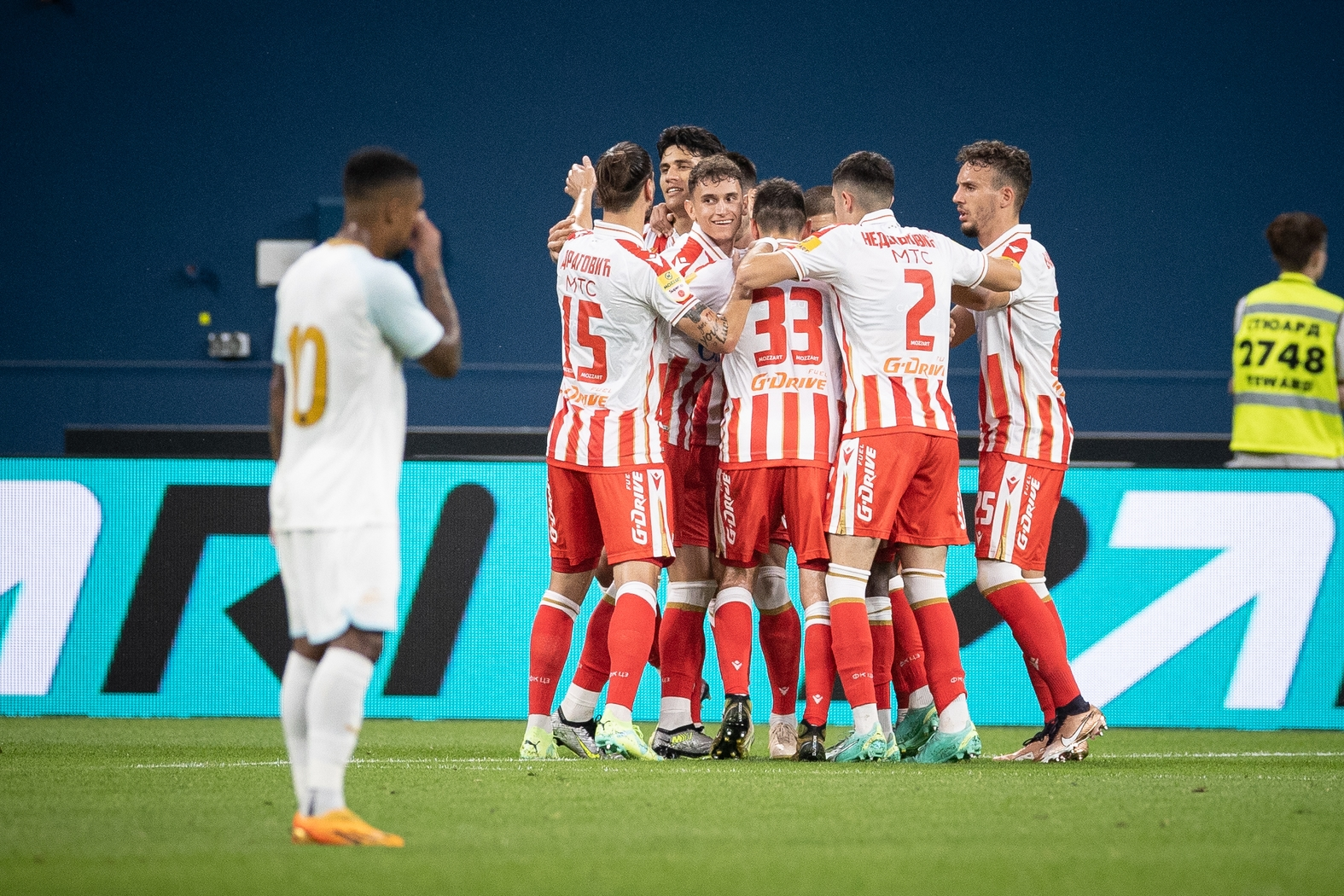
- Mitrović in 2023

Personal information
- Date of birth: 15 August 2002 (age 24)
- Place of birth: Kruševac, FR Yugoslavia
- Height: 1.81 m (5 ft 11 in)
- Position: Winger

Team information
- Current team: Vojvodina (on loan from Hellas Verona)
- Number: 7

Youth career
- Hamilton Serbians
- Givova Academy
- Hamilton United
- Empire Niagara Academy
- Toronto FC

Senior career*
Years	Team	Apps	(Gls)
2018–2019	Hamilton City 1	12	(7)
2019–2022	Radnički Niš	57	(13)
2022–2024	Red Star Belgrade	41	(6)
2024–	Hellas Verona	10	(0)
2024–2025	→ OH Leuven (loan)	20	(2)
2025–2026	→ Excelsior (loan)	9	(0)
2026	→ Asteras Tripolis (loan)	8	(0)
2026–	→ Vojvodina (loan)	3	(1)

International career^{‡}
2021	Serbia U20	1	(0)
2021–2024	Serbia U21	17	(6)
2022–	Serbia	10	(0)
- * Club domestic league appearances and goals as of 9 November 2026 ‡ National team caps and goals as of 14 October 2025

Stefan Mitrović (Serbian Cyrillic: Стефан Митровић; born 15 August 2002) is a Serbian professional footballer who plays as a winger for Serbian SuperLiga club Vojvodina, on loan from Serie B club Hellas Verona, and the Serbia national team.

== Early life ==
Mitrović was born in Kruševac, Serbia, FR Yugoslavia – and moved to Hamilton, Ontario, Canada, when he was six months old. Mitrović played for numerous youth academies in Ontario, including Hamilton Serbians, Serbian White Eagles, Givova Academy, Hamilton United, Empire Niagara Academy, and Toronto FC.

== Club career ==
In November 2018, Mitrović took part in the Canadian Premier League open tryouts, but was not approached by any club. In 2018 and 2019, he played with Hamilton City 1 in the Canadian Soccer League under head coach Saša Vuković.

Mitrović made his professional debut on 23 November 2019, with Radnički Niš, replacing Nikola Čumić in the 88th minute in a 2–0 defeat to Red Star Belgrade. Mitrović earned his first professional start on 30 May 2020, in a 1–1 draw against Napredak Kruševac, and scored his first goal on June 8 in a 4–3 victory over Radnik Surdulica. In March 2022, Radnički Niš announced Mitrović had signed a two-year contract extension.

On 1 February 2024, Mitrović signed with Serie A club Hellas Verona. On 6 September 2024, Mitrović moved to OH Leuven in Belgian Pro League on loan with an option to buy. On 2 September 2025, he was loaned to Excelsior in the Netherlands. On 31 January 2026, Mitrović moved on a new loan to Asteras Tripolis in Greece.

== International career ==
Mitrović was eligible to play for Canada and Serbia. In June 2020, he was revealed to be in contact with the Canadian U20 team and in the process of obtaining a Serbian passport. In August 2021, Mitrović was called up to the Serbia U-20 team for a friendly against Italy. He made an appearance in the match on 6 September as a second-half substitute. In November 2021, Mitrović accepted a call-up to the Serbia U21 and on 16 November in the match against Ukraine, he scored a goal in a 2–1 defeat.

In December 2021, Mitrović confirmed he had accepted a call-up from Canada for its January 2022 camp, however the camp was cancelled due to COVID-19 concerns. However, Mitrović chose to represent the senior Serbia national football team and debuted in a UEFA Nations League match against Sweden on 24 September 2022.

== Career statistics ==
=== Club ===
As of 9 November 2026

Club	Season	League			Cup		Continental		Other		Total	
Club	Season	Division	Apps	Goals	Apps	Goals	Apps	Goals	Apps	Goals	Apps	Goals
Radnički Niš	2019–20	Serbian SuperLiga	7	1	1	0	—		—		8	1
Radnički Niš	2020–21	Serbian SuperLiga	13	2	1	0	—		—		14	2
Radnički Niš	2021–22	Serbian SuperLiga	35	10	2	0	—		—		37	10
Radnički Niš	2022–23	Serbian SuperLiga	2	0	—		—		—		2	0
Radnički Niš	Total		57	13	4	0	—		—		61	13
Red Star Belgrade	2022–23	Serbian SuperLiga	32	5	3	0	8 (Note: Three appearances and one goal in UEFA Champions League, five appearances and two goals in UEFA Europa League)	3	—		43	8
Red Star Belgrade	2023–24	Serbian SuperLiga	9	1	1	0	3 (Note: Appearances UEFA Champions League)	0	—		13	1
Red Star Belgrade	Total		41	6	4	0	11	3	—		56	9
Hellas Verona	2023–24	Serie A	10	0	—		—		—		10	0
Hellas Verona	2024–25	Serie A	0	0	0	0	—		—		0	0
Hellas Verona	2025–26	Serie A	0	0	0	0	—		—		0	0
Hellas Verona	2026–27	Serie B	0	0	0	0	—		—		0	0
Hellas Verona	Total		10	0	0	0	—		—		10	0
OH Leuven (loan)	2024–25	Belgian Pro League	20	2	3	0	—		6	0	29	2
Excelsior (loan)	2025–26	Eredivisie	9	0	1	0	—		—		10	0
Asteras Tripolis (loan)	2025–26	Super League Greece	8	0	—		—		—		8	0
Vojvodina (loan)	2026–27	Serbian SuperLiga	3	1	1	0	4 (Note: Two appearances in UEFA Europa League qualifying, two appearances in UEFA Conference League qualifying)	0	—		8	1
Career total			148	22	13	0	15	3	6	0	182	25

=== International ===
As of 14 October 2025

Appearances and goals by national team and year
National team	Year	Apps	Goals
Serbia	2022	1	0
Serbia	2023	1	0
Serbia	2024	2	0
Serbia	2025	6	0
Total		10	0

== Honours ==
Red Star Belgrade

- Serbian SuperLiga: 2022–23
- Serbian Cup: 2022–23
