= Nikola Vasiljević (footballer, born 1996) =

Serbian footballer

Personal information
- Date of birth: 24 June 1996 (age 30)
- Place of birth: Niš, FR Yugoslavia
- Height: 2.02 m (6 ft 8 in)
- Position: Goalkeeper

Team information
- Current team: Kalamata
- Number: 40

Youth career
- Radnički Niš
- Sloboda Užice

Senior career*
Years	Team	Apps	(Gls)
2013–2014	Sloboda Užice	0	(0)
2014–2015	Radnički Niš	0	(0)
2015–2019	Radnik Surdulica	53	(0)
2019–2024	Red Star Belgrade	4	(0)
2020	→ Radnik Surdulica (loan)	8	(0)
2021	→ Proleter Novi Sad (loan)	16	(0)
2021–2022	→ Napredak Kruševac (loan)	33	(0)
2024	Radnički Niš	5	(0)
2024–2026	Javor Ivanjica	66	(0)
2026–	Kalamata	1	(0)
- * Club domestic league appearances and goals as of 20 September 2026

Nikola Vasiljević (Serbian Cyrillic: Никола Васиљевић; born 24 June 1996) is a Serbian professional footballer who plays as a goalkeeper for Super League Greece club Kalamata.

== Club career ==
Vasiljević started out at his hometown club Radnički Niš. He later switched to Sloboda Užice, being promoted to their senior squad in early 2013. In late summer 2014, Vasiljević returned to Radnički Niš and remained with the club for one season. He then joined Radnik Surdulica in the summer of 2015, making his senior debut the following spring. In March 2018, Vasiljević extended his contract with the club for three more years, and soon established himself as the team's first-choice goalkeeper.

== International career ==
In September 2018, Vasiljević was surprisingly called up by Mladen Krstajić to the Serbia national team to replace the injured Aleksandar Jovanović ahead of the team's UEFA Nations League games with Lithuania and Romania. He remained an unused substitute in both matches. Two months later, Vasiljević received his second call-up to the team, this time replacing the injured Marko Dmitrović for Serbia's final two Nations League fixtures versus Montenegro and Lithuania.

== Statistics ==
As of 22 June 2019

Club	Season	League		Cup		Continental		Total	
Club	Season	Apps	Goals	Apps	Goals	Apps	Goals	Apps	Goals
Radnik Surdulica	2015–16	1	0	0	0	—		1	0
Radnik Surdulica	2016–17	1	0	1	0	—		2	0
Radnik Surdulica	2017–18	16	0	1	0	—		17	0
Radnik Surdulica	2018–19	35	0	0	0	—		35	0
Radnik Surdulica	Total	53	0	2	0	—		55	0

== Honours ==
Red Star Belgrade

- Serbian SuperLiga: 2022–23
- Serbian Cup: 2022–23
