= Nikola Stanković (footballer, born 2003) =

Serbian association football player

Personal information
- Full name: Nikola Stanković
- Date of birth: 24 April 2003 (age 23)
- Place of birth: Vrnjačka Banja, Serbia and Montenegro
- Height: 1.81 m (5 ft 11 in)
- Position: Right back

Team information
- Current team: Čukarički

Youth career
- Red Star Belgrade

Senior career*
Years	Team	Apps	(Gls)
2020–2023	Red Star Belgrade	12	(0)
2020–2021	→ Grafičar Beograd (loan)	34	(1)
2023	→ Napredak Kruševac (loan)	15	(0)
2023–2025	Čukarički	57	(4)
2025–2026	Red Star Belgrade	12	(1)
2026–	Čukarički	0	(0)

International career^{‡}
2018	Serbia U16	1	(0)
2019	Serbia U17	3	(0)
2021–2022	Serbia U19	7	(0)
2022	Serbia U21	4	(0)
- * Club domestic league appearances and goals as of 19 August 2026 ‡ National team caps and goals as of 24 November 2023

Nikola Stanković (Serbian Cyrillic: Никола Станковић; born 24 April 2003) is a Serbian footballer who plays as a right back for Čukarički.

== Club career ==
Stanković grew up in the youth academy of Red Star Belgrade. In October 2020, he was loaned for two months to Grafičar Beograd, where he made his professional football debut on 12 October 2020 in a 0–0 draw against Kolubara in the Serbian First League. He scored his first goal nine days later in Serbian Cup against Voždovac. The loan was renewed again in February, and later also for the first half of the following season.

He returned to Red Star Belgrade in January 2022, on 12 February he made his debut for the red and white club in the 3-0 Serbian SuperLiga victory against Čukarički and on 11 May he scored a brace in the convincing 8-0 victory over Novi Pazar in the Serbian Cup. At the end of the season he extended his contract until 2025.

In January 2023 he was loaned to Napredak Kruševac to play more consistently. However, in the following summer transfer window he was purchased outright by Čukarički.

On 28 July 2025, Red Star Belgrade announced that had reached an agreement with Stanković on a four-year deal.

On 19 August 2026, Čukarički announced that Stanković came back to white and black team and signed three-year deal, in a transfer worth 550000 euros.

== International career ==
In 2022, Stanković, as part of the Serbia U19 team, took part in the 2022 UEFA European Under-19 Championship in Slovakia. At the tournament, he played in matches against the teams of Israel U19, England U19 and Austria U19.

== Career statistics ==
=== Club ===
As of match played 22 May 2026

Club	Season	League			Serbian Cup		Europe		Total	
Club	Season	Division	Apps	Goals	Apps	Goals	Apps	Goals	Apps	Goals
Red Star Belgrade	2021–22	Serbian SuperLiga	6	0	1	2	0	0	7	2
Red Star Belgrade	2022–23	Serbian SuperLiga	6	0	0	0	1 (Note: Appearances in UEFA Champions League)	0	7	0
Red Star Belgrade	Total		12	0	1	2	1	0	14	2
Grafičar Beograd (loan)	2020–21	Serbian First League	22	0	1	1	—		23	1
Grafičar Beograd (loan)	2021–22	Serbian First League	12	1	0	0	—		12	1
Grafičar Beograd (loan)	Total		34	1	1	1	0	0	35	2
Napredak Kruševac (loan)	2022–23	Serbian SuperLiga	15	0	1	0	—		16	0
Čukarički	2023–24	Serbian SuperLiga	25	1	2	0	8 (Note: Two appearances in UEFA Europa League, six appearances in UEFA Conference League)	0	35	1
Čukarički	2024–25	Serbian SuperLiga	31	3	2	0	—		33	3
Čukarički	2025–26	Serbian SuperLiga	1	0	0	0	—		1	0
Čukarički	Total		57	4	4	0	8	0	69	4
Red Star Belgrade	2025–26	Serbian SuperLiga	12	1	2	0	4 (Note: Appearances in UEFA Europa League)	0	18	1
Career total			130	6	9	3	13	0	152	9

== Honours ==
Red Star Belgrade

- Serbian SuperLiga: 2021–22, 2025–26
- Serbian Cup: 2021–22, 2025–26
