= Aleksa Matić =

Serbian footballer (born 2002)

Personal information
- Date of birth: 20 September 2002 (age 24)
- Height: 1.84 m (6 ft 0 in)
- Position: Midfielder

Team information
- Current team: Stabæk
- Number: 6

Youth career
- –2017: Vojvodina
- 2017–2020: Red Star Belgrade

Senior career*
| Years | Team | Apps | (Gls) |
| 2020–2022 | Red Star Belgrade | 0 | (0) |
| 2020–2022 | → Grafičar Beograd (loan) | 47 | (2) |
| 2022 | Minsk | 11 | (0) |
| 2023–2024 | Voždovac | 48 | (0) |
| 2024– | Stabæk | 49 | (10) |

International career^{‡}
| 2023– | Serbia U21 | 4 | (0) |
- * Club domestic league appearances and goals as of 14 November 2026 ‡ National team caps and goals as of 26 March 2024

Aleksa Matić (Serbian Cyrillic: Алекса Матић, born 20 September 2002) is a Serbian footballer who currently plays as a midfielder for Stabæk in Norway.

He played for Voždovac. In August 2024 he signed for Stabæk.

== Career statistics ==
As of 15 July 2022.

| Club | Season | League | | | Cup | | Continental | | Total | |
| Club | Season | Division | Apps | Goals | Apps | Goals | Apps | Goals | Apps | Goals |
|---|---|---|---|---|---|---|---|---|---|---|
| Grafičar Beograd (loan) | 2020–21 | Serbian First League | 21 | 1 | 1 (Note: Appearances in the Serbian Cup) | 0 | – | | 22 | 1 |
| Grafičar Beograd (loan) | 2021–22 | Serbian First League | 26 | 1 | 0 | 0 | – | | 26 | 1 |
| Career total | | | 47 | 2 | 1 | 0 | 0 | 0 | 48 | 2 |
