= Uroš Lazić =

Serbian footballer (born 2003)

Personal information
- Full name: Uroš Lazić
- Date of birth: 15 March 2003 (age 23)
- Place of birth: Niš, Serbia and Montenegro
- Height: 1.74 m (5 ft 9 in)
- Position: Defender

Team information
- Current team: OFK Beograd
- Number: 21

Youth career
- –2021: Red Star Belgrade
- 2020: → Grafičar Beograd (youth loan)

Senior career*
Years	Team	Apps	(Gls)
2021–2024	Red Star Belgrade	0	(0)
2021–2022	→ Grafičar Beograd (loan)	53	(1)
2023	→ Radnik Surdulica (loan)	17	(0)
2023–2024	→ Novi Pazar (loan)	18	(2)
2024	→ České Budějovice (loan)	6	(0)
2024–	OFK Beograd	28	(0)
2025	→ Napredak Kruševac (loan)	12	(0)

International career^{‡}
2019–2020	Serbia U17	6	(1)
2021–2022	Serbia U19	16	(1)
2022–	Serbia U21	5	(0)
- * Club domestic league appearances and goals as of 12 June 2026 ‡ National team caps and goals as of 00:19, 24 November 2023 (UTC)

Uroš Lazić (Serbian Cyrillic: Урош Лазић, born 15 March 2003) is a Serbian footballer who currently plays as a right-back for Serbian club OFK Beograd.

== Club career ==
Born in Niš, Serbia, Lazić was part of, Red Star Belgrade youth categories. He began his senior career at Grafičar Beograd, where he was loaned out till January 2021.

On 27 May 2021, Lazić extended his contract with Red Star Belgrade, being tied to the club until June 2025.

Lazić was loaned to Radnik Surdulica in January 2023, the transfer was announced on 29 December 2022. He then debuted in the Serbian First League, playing his first match on 3 February 2023 against Kolubara. He started and his team lost by result of 1 – 0.

In the 22 February 2024, Lazić was loaned to České Budějovice, in the club from the Czech First League, until the end of the season.

He made his first appearance for the club on 2 March 2024, in a league match against Mladá Boleslav. He came on as a substitute for Samuel Šigut and his team lost on away game by result of 3 – 1.

== International career ==
With the Serbia U17 national team, he played a total of six matches between 2019 and 2020, scoring one goal.

Lazić played his first match with the Serbia U21 national team on 27 September 2022, against Bulgaria U21 national team where he started and bouth teams played by results of 1 – 1.

== Career statistics ==
=== Club ===
As of 29 December 2022

Club	Season	League			Cup		Continental		Total	
Club	Season	Division	Apps	Goals	Apps	Goals	Apps	Goals	Apps	Goals
Grafičar Beograd (loan)	2020–21	Serbian First League	13	1	0	0	–		13	1
Grafičar Beograd (loan)	2021–22	Serbian First League	24	0	0	0	–		24	0
Grafičar Beograd (loan)	2022–23	Serbian First League	16	0	1	0	–		17	0
Grafičar Beograd (loan)	Total		53	1	1	0	0	0	54	1
Radnik Surdulica (loan)	2022–23	Serbian SuperLiga	17	0	1	0	–		18	0
Career total			70	1	2	0	0	0	72	1
