= Alex Vigo =

Argentine footballer (born 1999)

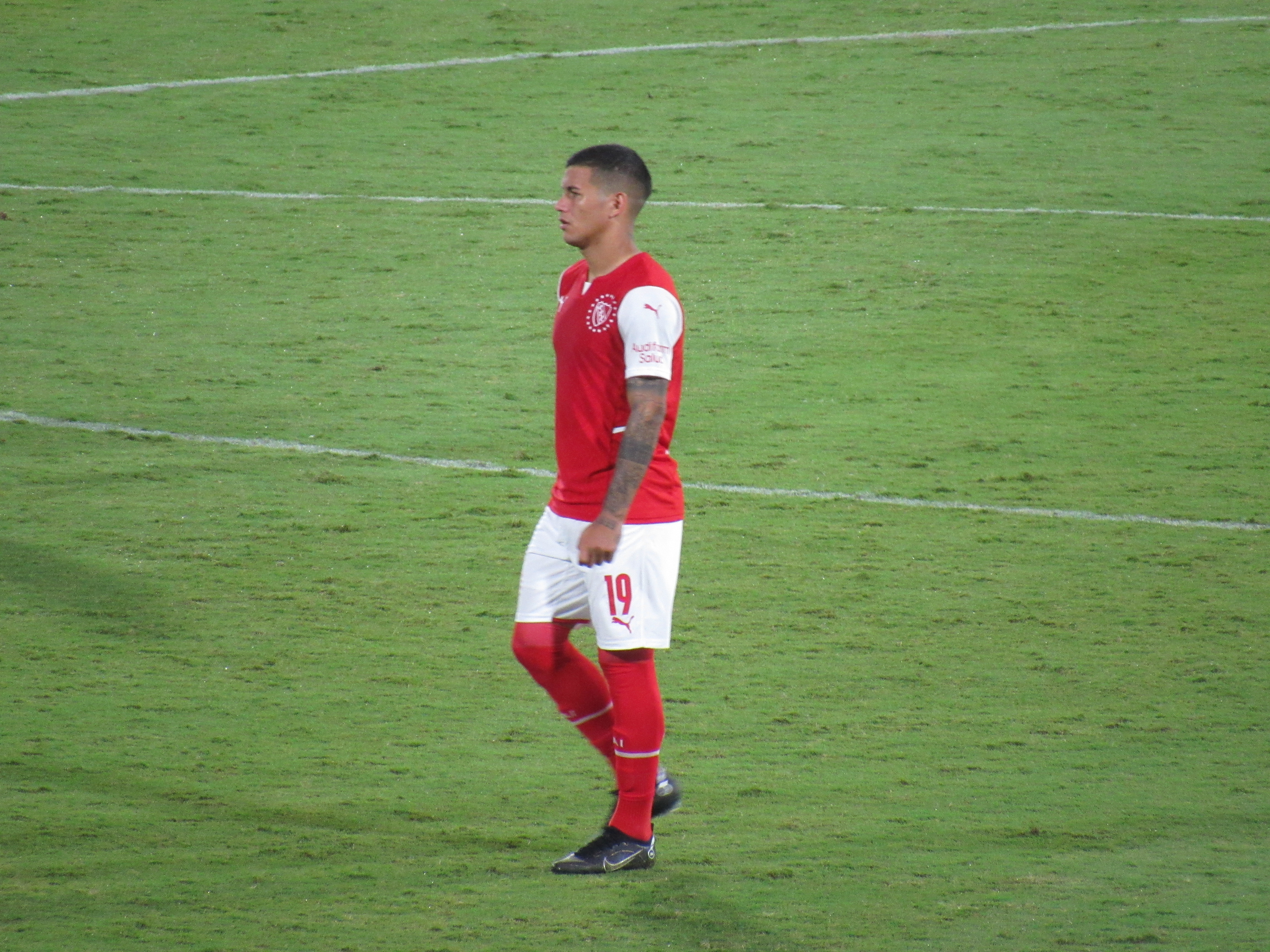
- Vigo playing for Independiente in 2022

Personal information
- Full name: Alex Vigo Gamaliel
- Birth name: Alex Gómez
- Date of birth: 28 April 1999 (age 27)
- Place of birth: Colastiné Sur, Argentina
- Height: 1.75 m (5 ft 9 in)
- Position: Right-back

Team information
- Current team: Independiente Rivadavia
- Number: 28

Youth career
- UNL
- 2009–2019: Colón

Senior career*
| Years | Team | Apps | (Gls) |
| 2019–2021 | Colón | 30 | (0) |
| 2021–2024 | River Plate | 17 | (0) |
| 2022–2023 | → Independiente (loan) | 35 | (1) |
| 2023 | → Red Star Belgrade (loan) | 13 | (2) |
| 2024–2026 | Talleres | 19 | (0) |
| 2025 | → Sarmiento (loan) | 25 | (0) |
| 2026– | Independiente Rivadavia | 1 | (0) |
- * Club domestic league appearances and goals as of 16:41, 16 August 2026 (UTC)

Alex Vigo Gamaliel (born 28 April 1999) is an Argentine professional footballer who plays as a right-back for Independiente Rivadavia.

== Career ==
=== Colón ===
Vigo joined Colón's academy in 2009 from Liga Santafesina team UNL. His senior career got underway during the 2018–19 season, with the defender being an unused substitute in July 2018 for a Copa Argentina victory over Deportivo Morón. He made his professional debut six months later, featuring for the full duration of a Primera División fixture with Argentinos Juniors on 28 January 2019; having signed his first professional contract on 23 January. Vigo featured ten times in his first campaign, which included three appearances in the Copa Sudamericana as they reached the final; where he'd start, though Colón would lose to Independiente del Valle.

=== River Plate ===
On 19 February 2021, Vigo completed a transfer to fellow Primera División team River Plate; twelve months on from rejecting the move due to personal issues. He was bought for a fee around 1.75 million euros.

On 7 February 2022, Vigo was loaned out to Independiente until the end of 2022 with a purchase option of 2.5 million dollars for 50 percent of the pass.

== Personal life ==
Vigo was born under the name Alex Gómez, the surname of his mother. However, aged 10, a judge ordered that he and his sister, Aixa, had to take their biological father's surname of Vigo, despite the latter leaving their mother weeks before Alex's birth. Vigo's mother, Verónica, had initiated the court case due to the effects of the father's departure, which led to food shortages due to low income. Vigo was born in Colastiné Sur, where his home would regularly flood from the nearby Paraná River. He rejected a transfer offer from River Plate in early 2020 as he wanted to remain in Colastiné Sur to help his family contain the constant flooding.

== Career statistics ==
As of match played 7 April 2024.

Club statistics
| Club | Season | League | | | Cup | | League Cup | | Continental | | Other | | Total | |
| Club | Season | Division | Apps | Goals | Apps | Goals | Apps | Goals | Apps | Goals | Apps | Goals | Apps | Goals |
|---|---|---|---|---|---|---|---|---|---|---|---|---|---|---|
| Colón | 2018–19 | Primera División | 6 | 0 | 0 | 0 | 1 | 0 | 3 (Note: Appearance(s) in the Copa Sudamericana) | 0 | 0 | 0 | 10 | 0 |
| Colón | 2019–20 | Primera División | 14 | 0 | 0 | 0 | 1 | 0 | 7 | 0 | 0 | 0 | 22 | 0 |
| Colón | 2020–21 | Primera División | 10 | 0 | 1 | 0 | 0 | 0 | — | | 0 | 0 | 11 | 0 |
| Colón | Total | | 30 | 0 | 1 | 0 | 2 | 0 | 10 | 0 | 0 | 0 | 43 | 0 |
| River Plate | 2021 | Primera División | 17 | 0 | 0 | 0 | — | | 2 (Note: Appearance(s) in the Copa Libertadores) | 0 | 0 | 0 | 19 | 0 |
| Independiente (loan) | 2022 | Primera División | 35 | 1 | 4 | 0 | 0 | 0 | 3 | 0 | 0 | 0 | 42 | 0 |
| Red Star Belgrade (loan) | 2022–23 | SuperLiga | 13 | 2 | 3 | 0 | 0 | 0 | 0 | 0 | 0 | 0 | 16 | 2 |
| Talleres | 2024 | Primera División | 3 | 0 | 1 | 0 | 0 | 0 | 0 | 0 | 0 | 0 | 4 | 0 |
| Career total | | | 98 | 3 | 9 | 0 | 2 | 0 | 15 | 0 | 0 | 0 | 124 | 3 |

== Honours ==
Red Star Belgrade

- Serbian SuperLiga: 2022–23
- Serbian Cup: 2022–23
