= Zoran Popović =

Serbian footballer (born 1988)

Personal information
- Date of birth: 28 May 1988 (age 38)
- Place of birth: Pakrac, SR Croatia, SFR Yugoslavia
- Height: 1.88 m (6 ft 2 in)
- Position: Goalkeeper

Team information
- Current team: Železničar Pančevo
- Number: 1

Senior career*
Years	Team	Apps	(Gls)
2006–2008	Čukarički	0	(0)
2006	→ Bratstvo Krnjača (loan)		
2007	→ Vršac (loan)	13	(0)
2007–2008	→ Palić (loan)	19	(0)
2008–2009	Voždovac	25	(0)
2009–2011	Beograd	38	(0)
2011–2013	Voždovac	61	(0)
2013	Vojvodina	0	(0)
2014	Voždovac	4	(0)
2014–2015	Napredak Kruševac	19	(0)
2015–2018	Voždovac	78	(0)
2018	Bodø/Glimt	7	(0)
2018–2024	Red Star Belgrade	28	(0)
2023	→ Čukarički (loan)	5	(0)
2024–	Železničar Pančevo	62	(0)
- * Club domestic league appearances and goals as of 12 June 2026

Zoran Popović (Serbian Cyrillic: Зоран Поповић; born 28 May 1988) is a Serbian professional footballer who plays as a goalkeeper for Železničar Pančevo.

== Career ==
While playing for Voždovac in the 2016–17 Serbian SuperLiga, Popović was named in the competition's Team of the Season.

On 12 February 2018, Popović was transferred to Norwegian club Bodø/Glimt.

On 26 June 2018, Popović signed two-year deal with Red Star Belgrade.

== Honours ==
Red Star Belgrade

- Serbian SuperLiga: 2018–19, 2019–20, 2020–21, 2021–22, 2023–24
- Serbian Cup: 2020–21, 2021–22, 2023–24

Individual

- Serbian SuperLiga Team of the Season: 2016–17
