= Jovan Mituljikić =

Serbian footballer (born 2003)

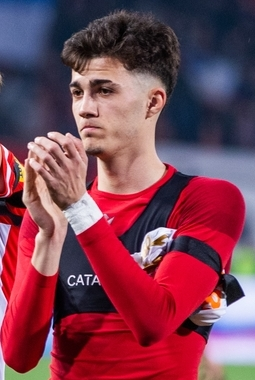

Personal information
- Date of birth: 20 January 2003 (age 23)
- Place of birth: Negotin, FR Yugoslavia
- Height: 1.80 m (5 ft 11 in)
- Position: Attacking midfielder

Team information
- Current team: Francs Borains
- Number: 9

Youth career
- –2021: Red Star Belgrade

Senior career*
Years	Team	Apps	(Gls)
2021–2025	Red Star Belgrade	1	(0)
2021–2022	→ Grafičar (loan)	45	(13)
2023	→ Mladost Novi Sad (loan)	14	(1)
2023	→ Radnički 1923 (loan)	1	(0)
2023–2024	→ OFK Beograd (dual)	24	(3)
2024	→ Novi Pazar (loan)	11	(0)
2025	Radnički Niš	8	(0)
2025–	Francs Borains	15	(0)

International career^{‡}
2021–2022	Serbia U19	10	(2)
2022–2023	Serbia U21	2	(0)
- * Club domestic league appearances and goals as of 20 April 2026 ‡ National team caps and goals as of 24 March 2023

Jovan Mituljikić (Serbian Cyrillic: Јован Митуљикић; born 20 January 2003) is a Serbian professional footballer who plays as an attacking midfielder for Belgian Challenger Pro League club Francs Borains.

== Club career ==
On 28 July 2025, Mituljikić signed with Francs Borains in Belgium for two years, with an optional third year.

== Personal life ==
Jovan's twin brother Nikola is also a professional footballer.
