= Vuk Bogdanović =

Serbian footballer (born 2002)

Personal information
- Full name: Vuk Bogdanović
- Date of birth: 3 April 2002 (age 24)
- Place of birth: Belgrade, FR Yugoslavia
- Height: 1.87 m (6 ft 2 in)
- Position: Centre-back

Team information
- Current team: Čukarički
- Number: 15

Youth career
- Red Star Belgrade
- 2018–2021: Voždovac

Senior career*
Years	Team	Apps	(Gls)
2021	Voždovac	1	(0)
2021	Spartak Subotica	3	(0)
2022	Rad	11	(0)
2022	Red Star Belgrade	1	(0)
2023	Vojvodina	2	(0)
2023	→ Voždovac (loan)	1	(0)
2024	Red Star Belgrade	0	(0)
2024	→ OFK Beograd (loan)	6	(0)
2024	→ Dubočica (loan)	20	(1)
2025	Mladost Lučani	6	(0)
2025–	Čukarički	1	(0)
2025–2026	Dubočica (loan)	14	(1)

International career^{‡}
2018	Serbia U17	1	(0)
2021	Serbia U19	2	(0)
- * Club domestic league appearances and goals as of 12 June 2026 ‡ National team caps and goals as of 25 February 2021

Vuk Bogdanović (Serbian Cyrillic: Вук Богдановић ; born 3 April 2002) is a Serbian professional footballer who plays as a centre-back for Serbian SuperLiga club Čukarički.

== Club career ==
After the junior selections he passed in Red Star Belgrade, Bogdanović moved to Voždovac and continued his football education there. As the captain of the youth team, he joined the first team with which he went through winter training in Antalya in 2021. He made his debut in the match against Partizan in the quarter finals of the Serbian Cup, entering the game instead of Nemanja Milojević in the 77th minute. In the Serbian SuperLiga he also made his debut against Partizan, two months later. In June 2021, Bogdanović was presented as a new football player of Spartak with whom he signed a three-year contract. At the end of the same calendar year, the cooperation was terminated. He played half a season in the Rad jersey, after which he returned to Red Star Belgrade and signed a three-year contract.
