= Lazar Nikolić =

Serbian footballer (born 1999)

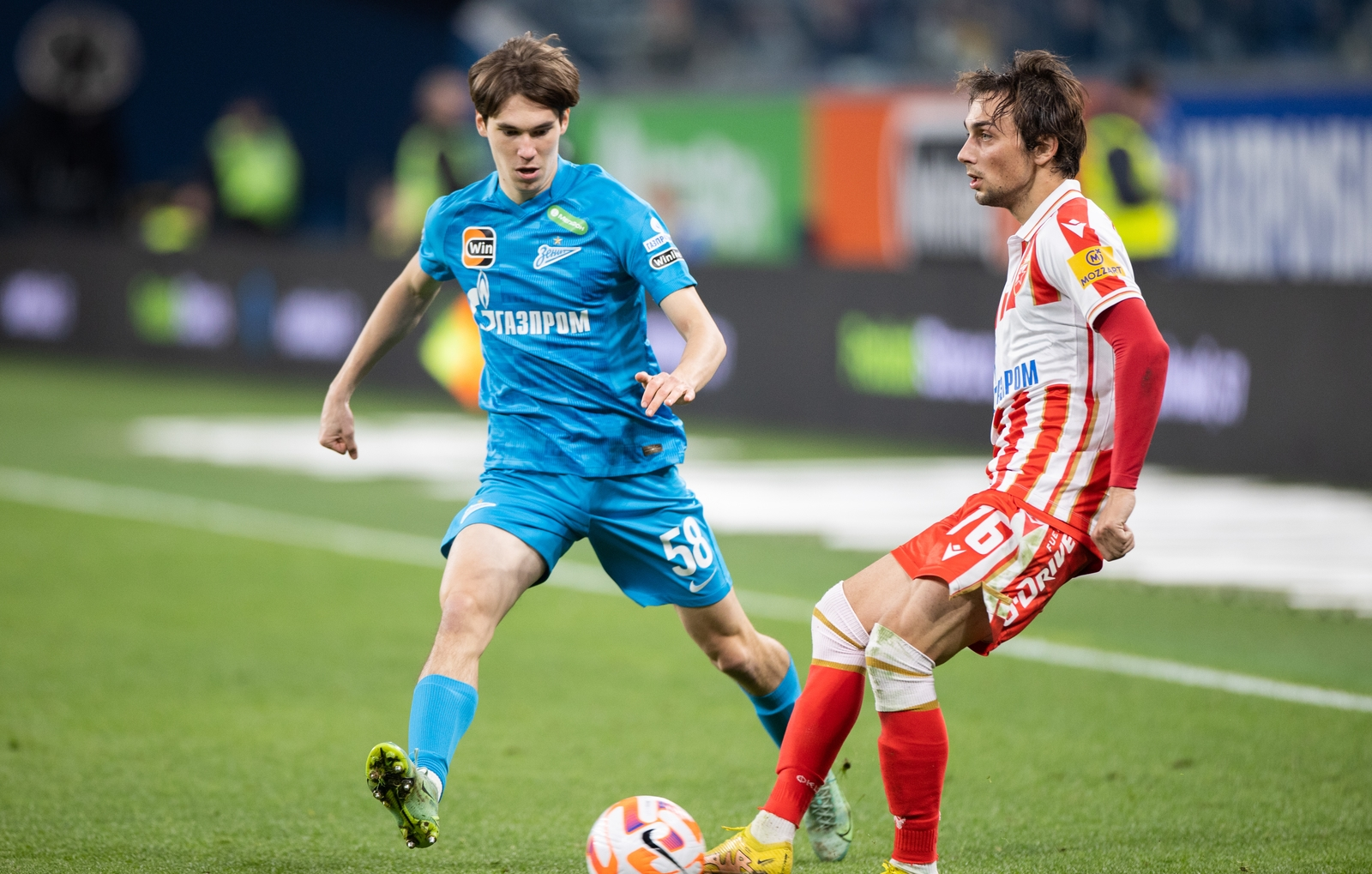
- Nikolić playing for Red Star Belgrade in a friendly against Zenit Saint Petersburg in November 2022

Personal information
- Date of birth: 1 August 1999 (age 27)
- Place of birth: Leskovac, FR Yugoslavia
- Height: 1.76 m (5 ft 9 in)
- Positions: Right-back; winger

Team information
- Current team: Vojvodina
- Number: 22

Youth career
- Dubočica
- OFK Beograd
- 2017–2018: Partizan
- 2018–2019: SPAL

Senior career*
Years	Team	Apps	(Gls)
2016–2017	OFK Beograd	2	(0)
2017–2018	Partizan	0	(0)
2018–2019	SPAL	0	(0)
2019–2022	Javor Ivanjica	100	(9)
2022–2024	Red Star Belgrade	21	(0)
2024–	Vojvodina	69	(2)

International career^{‡}
2016–2017	Serbia U18	11	(2)
2017–2018	Serbia U19	6	(0)
2026–	Serbia	0	(0)
- * Club domestic league appearances and goals as of 22 November 2026 ‡ National team caps and goals as of 18 September 2026

Lazar Nikolić (Serbian Cyrillic: Лазар Николић; born 1 August 1999) is a Serbian professional footballer who plays as a right-back for Vojvodina.

== Career ==
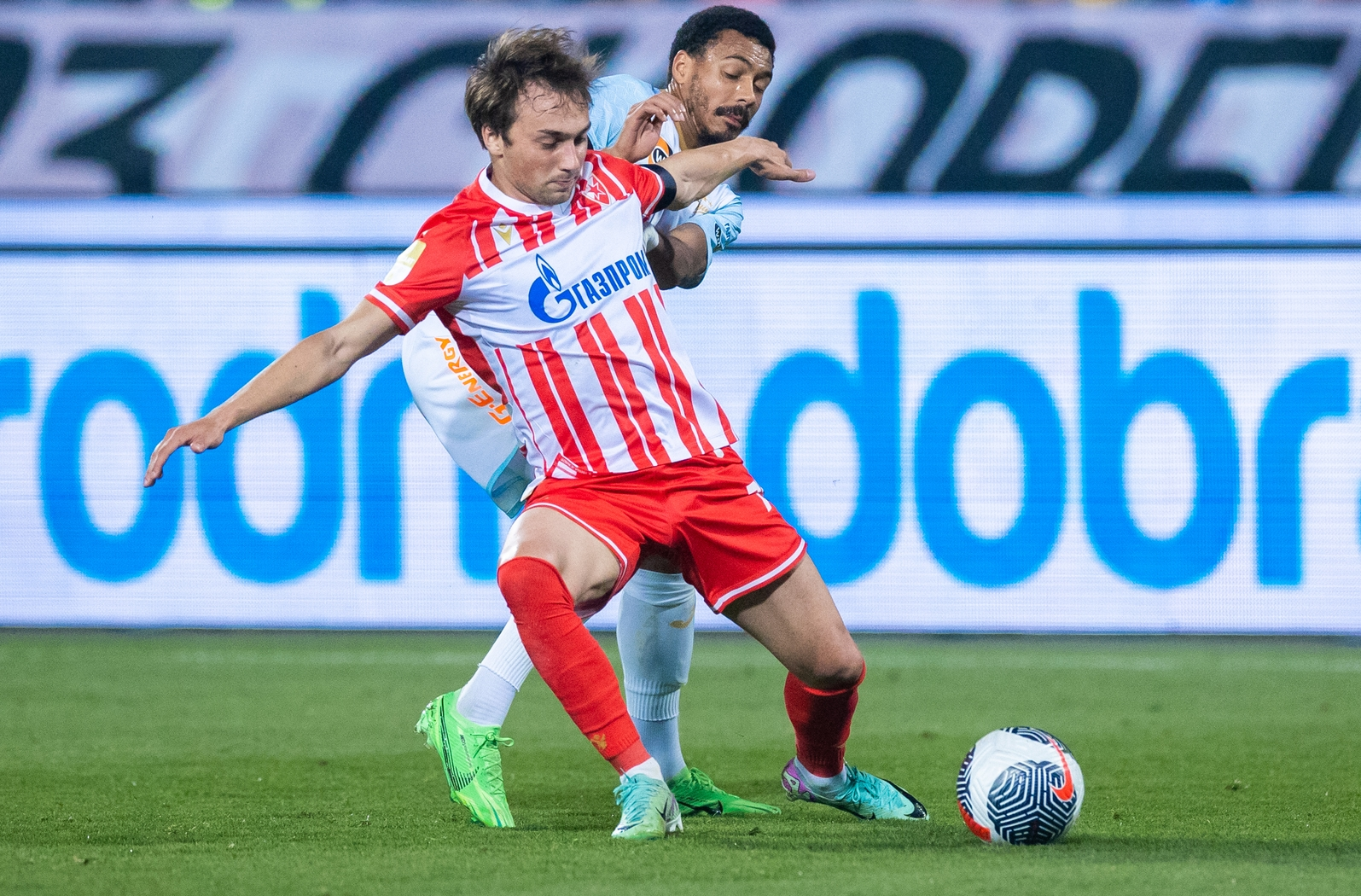
Nikolić in action for Red Star Belgrade in 2024 friendly match against Zenit Saint Petersburg

In 2017, Nikolić joined the youth academy of Partizan.

In 2018, he signed for SPAL in the Italian Serie A.

In 2019, he signed for Javor Ivanjica in the Serbian top flight.

== Honours ==
Red Star Belgrade

- Serbian SuperLiga: 2022–23, 2023–24
- Serbian Cup: 2022–23, 2023–24
