= Milan Ilić (footballer, born 2000) =

Serbian football player

Personal information
- Full name: Milan Ilić
- Date of birth: 7 February 2000 (age 26)
- Place of birth: Belgrade, FR Yugoslavia
- Height: 1.80 m (5 ft 11 in)
- Position: Right back

Team information
- Current team: Javor Ivanjica
- Number: 2

Senior career*
Years	Team	Apps	(Gls)
2017–2018	GSP Polet	20	(1)
2018	Teleoptik	4	(0)
2019–2020	Dinamo Vranje	3	(0)
2020–2021	Loznica	32	(3)
2021–2022	Red Star Belgrade	0	(0)
2021	→ Loznica (loan)	19	(2)
2022	→ Grafičar Beograd (loan)	20	(2)
2023–	Javor Ivanjica	89	(1)

International career
2021–	Serbia U21	1	(0)
- * Club domestic league appearances and goals as of 13 June 2026

Milan Ilić (Serbian Cyrillic: Милан Илић; born 7 February 2000) is a Serbian professional footballer who plays as a right back for Javor Ivanjica.

== Club career ==
=== Red Star Belgrade ===
Ilić signed a three-years contract with Red Star on 5 July 2021.

== International career ==
Ilić debut for Serbia U21 national team was on 6 June 2021 in a friendly match against Russia U21.
