= Yegor Prutsev =

Russian footballer

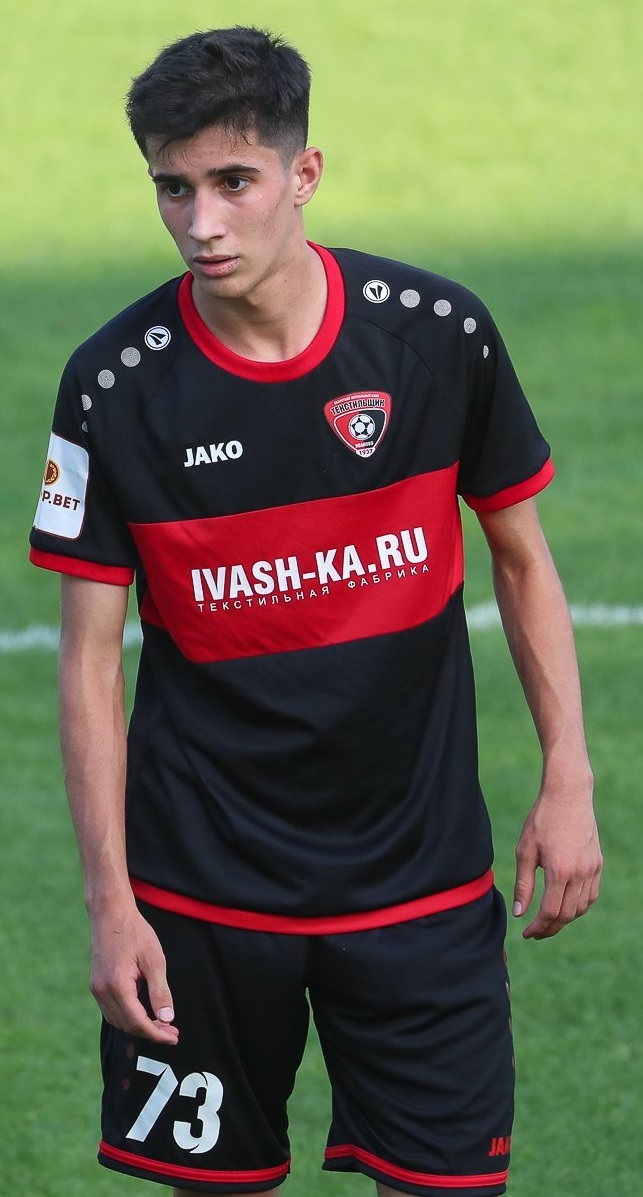
- Prutsev with Tekstilshchik Ivanovo in 2021

Personal information
- Full name: Yegor Igorevich Prutsev
- Date of birth: 23 December 2002 (age 23)
- Place of birth: Krasnodar, Russia
- Height: 1.81 m (5 ft 11 in)
- Position: Midfielder

Team information
- Current team: Dunkerque

Youth career
- Akademiya Futbola Krasnodar

Senior career*
Years	Team	Apps	(Gls)
2019–2022	Sochi	1	(0)
2021–2022	→ Tekstilshchik Ivanovo (loan)	24	(2)
2022	→ Neftekhimik Nizhnekamsk (loan)	13	(3)
2022–2026	Red Star Belgrade	21	(0)
2023–2024	→ Celje (loan)	30	(5)
2025	→ Celje (loan)	11	(6)
2025–2026	→ OFK Beograd (loan)	17	(1)
2026–	Dunkerque	0	(0)

International career
2022	Russia U21	2	(0)
- * Club domestic league appearances and goals as of 12 June 2026

Yegor Igorevich Prutsev (Russian: Егор Игоревич Пруцев; born 23 December 2002) is a Russian professional footballer who plays as a midfielder for French Ligue 2 club Dunkerque.

== Club career ==
Prutsev made his debut in the Russian Premier League for Sochi on 26 September 2020 in a game against Krasnodar.

On 16 June 2021, he joined Tekstilshchik Ivanovo on loan for the 2021–22 season. On 16 February 2022, Prutsev moved on a new loan to Neftekhimik Nizhnekamsk.

On 11 August 2022, he joined Serbian powerhouse Red Star Belgrade on a four-year-long contract.

On 17 June 2026, Prutsev signed a four-year contract with Dunkerque in French Ligue 2.

== Personal life ==
His older brother Danil Prutsev is also a footballer.

== Honours ==
Red Star Belgrade

- Serbian SuperLiga: 2022–23
- Serbian Cup: 2022–23

Celje

- Slovenian PrvaLiga: 2023–24

Individual

- Slovenian PrvaLiga Young Player of the Year: 2023–24
