= 2022 UEFA European Under-19 Championship qualification =

Tournament details
- Dates: Qualifying round: 6 October – 16 November 2021; Elite round: 23 March – 7 June 2022
- Teams: 54 (from 1 confederation)

Tournament statistics
- Matches played: 117
- Goals scored: 373 (3.19 per match)
- Top scorer(s): (Iceland) Orri Steinn Óskarsson (Italy) Wilfried Gnonto (5 goals each)

The 2022 UEFA European Under-19 Championship qualifying competition was a men's under-19 football competition that determined the seven teams joining the automatically qualified hosts Slovakia in the 2022 UEFA European Under-19 Championship final tournament. Players born on or after 1 January 2003 were eligible to participate.

Originally, the qualifying competition would use a new format with teams split into three different leagues with promotion and relegation, with the draw of the first round under the new format already held in December 2019. However, on 17 June 2020, UEFA announced that the introduction of the new format had been postponed to the next edition due to the COVID-19 pandemic, and qualification for this edition would use the previous format involving two rounds only.

Apart from Slovakia, 53 of the remaining 54 UEFA member national teams entered the qualifying competition, where the original format consisted of a qualifying round that took place in autumn 2021, and an elite round that took place in spring and summer 2022.

== Format ==
The qualifying competition consisted of the following two rounds:

- Qualifying round: Apart from Portugal, which received a bye to the elite round as the team with the highest seeding coefficient, the remaining 52 teams were drawn into 13 groups of four teams. Each group was played in single round-robin format at one of the teams selected as hosts after the draw. The thirteen group winners, thirteen runners-up, and the third-placed team with the best record against the first and second-placed teams in their group advanced to the elite round.
- Elite round: The 28 teams were drawn into seven groups of four teams. Each group was played in single round-robin format at one of the teams selected as hosts after the draw. The seven group winners qualified for the final tournament.

The schedule of each group was as follows, with two rest days between each matchday (Regulations Article 20.04):

Group schedule
Matchday	Matches
Matchday 1	1 v 4, 3 v 2
Matchday 2	1 v 3, 2 v 4
Matchday 3	2 v 1, 4 v 3

=== Tiebreakers ===
In the qualifying round and elite round, teams were ranked according to points (3 points for a win, 1 point for a draw, 0 points for a loss), and if tied on points, the following tiebreaking criteria were applied, in the order given, to determine the rankings (Regulations Articles 14.01 and 14.02):

1. Points in head-to-head matches among tied teams;
2. Goal difference in head-to-head matches among tied teams;
3. Goals scored in head-to-head matches among tied teams;
4. If more than two teams were tied, and after applying all head-to-head criteria above, a subset of teams were still tied, all head-to-head criteria above were reapplied exclusively to this subset of teams;
5. Goal difference in all group matches;
6. Goals scored in all group matches;
7. Penalty shoot-out if only two teams had the same number of points, and they met in the last round of the group and are tied after applying all criteria above (not used if more than two teams had the same number of points, or if their rankings were not relevant for qualification for the next stage);
8. Disciplinary points (red card = 3 points, yellow card = 1 point, expulsion for two yellow cards in one match = 3 points);
9. UEFA coefficient ranking for the qualifying round draw;
10. Drawing of lots.

To determine the best third-placed team from the qualifying round, the results against the teams in fourth place were discarded. The following criteria were applied (Regulations Articles 15.01 and 15.02):

1. Points;
2. Goal difference;
3. Goals scored;
4. Disciplinary points (total 3 matches);
5. UEFA coefficient ranking for the qualifying round draw;
6. Drawing of lots.

== Qualifying round ==
=== Draw ===
The draw for the qualifying round was held on 3 December 2019, 10:00 CET (UTC+1), at the UEFA headquarters in Nyon, Switzerland.

The teams were seeded according to their coefficient ranking, calculated based on the following:

- 2016 UEFA European Under-19 Championship final tournament and qualifying competition (qualifying round and elite round)
- 2017 UEFA European Under-19 Championship final tournament and qualifying competition (qualifying round and elite round)
- 2018 UEFA European Under-19 Championship final tournament and qualifying competition (qualifying round and elite round)
- 2019 UEFA European Under-19 Championship final tournament and qualifying competition (qualifying round and elite round)

Each group contained one team from Pot A, one team from Pot B, one team from Pot C, and one team from Pot D. Based on the decisions taken by the UEFA Emergency Panel, the following pairs of teams could not be drawn in the same group: Spain and Gibraltar, Ukraine and Russia, Serbia and Kosovo, Russia and Kosovo, Bosnia and Herzegovina and Kosovo.

Final tournament hosts: Team / Coeff. / Rank; **Slovakia** / 10.167 / —	Bye to elite round: Team / Coeff. / Rank; Portugal / 29.389 / 1

Teams entering qualifying round

Pot A
Team	Coeff.	Rank
France	23.778	2
England	23.000	3
Italy	21.889	4
Netherlands	16.778	5
Czech Republic	16.722	6
Spain	16.222	7
Germany	15.833	8
Ukraine	14.389	9
Republic of Ireland	13.278	10
Norway	12.611	11
Turkey	12.611	12
Austria	11.833	13
Croatia	11.611	14

Pot B
Team	Coeff.	Rank
Greece	11.000	15
**Belgium**	10.667	16
**Sweden**	10.278	17
**Serbia**	10.167	18
Poland	10.167	19
**Scotland**	9.833	20
**Israel**	9.833	21
Bulgaria	9.722	22
**Hungary**	9.167	23
**Romania**	8.833	24
**Denmark**	8.833	25
Slovenia	8.167	26
**Georgia**	7.833	27

Pot C
Team	Coeff.	Rank
**Russia**	7.333	28
**Finland**	7.333	29
Switzerland	7.000	30
**Bosnia and Herzegovina**	6.667	31
Cyprus	5.333	32
Wales	5.000	33
Latvia	4.667	34
**Iceland**	4.667	35
Azerbaijan	4.500	36
North Macedonia	4.333	37
Northern Ireland	4.333	38
Belarus	4.333	39
**Armenia**	3.667	40

Pot D
Team	Coeff.	Rank
Montenegro	3.333	41
Kosovo	3.167	42
Malta	2.333	43
Albania	2.000	44
Kazakhstan	1.667	45
Andorra	1.667	46
Luxembourg	1.667	47
Moldova	1.333	48
Estonia	1.333	49
Faroe Islands	1.333	50
Lithuania	1.000	51
Gibraltar	0.333	52
San Marino	0.000	53

Notes

- Teams marked in **bold** qualified for the final tournament.

Did not enter
Liechtenstein

=== Groups ===
The qualifying round was originally scheduled to be played by 17 November 2020. However, due to the COVID-19 pandemic in Europe, UEFA announced on 13 August 2020 that after consultation with the 55 member associations, the qualifying round would be delayed to March 2021.

Times up to 27 March 2022 are CET (UTC+1), thereafter times are CEST (UTC+2), as listed by UEFA (local times, if different, are in parentheses).

==== Group 1 ====
Pos	Team	Pld	W	D	L	GF	GA	GD	Pts	Qualification
1	England	3	2	1	0	6	0	+6	**7**	Elite round
2	Sweden (H)	3	2	0	1	4	3	+1	**6**	Elite round
3	Switzerland	3	1	1	1	7	2	+5	**4**	
4	Andorra	3	0	0	3	0	12	−12	**0**	

Source: UEFA
Rules for classification: Tiebreakers
(H) Hosts
10 November 2021
13:00

England	4–0	Andorra
Iling-Junior 24'; Chukwuemeka 41'; Scarlett 55', 66' (pen.)	Report

Skytteholms IP, Stockholm
Referee: Vitālijs Spasjoņņikovs (Latvia)
10 November 2021
18:30

Switzerland	1–2	Sweden
Fink 71'	Report	Qasem 45+2'; Björkqvist 90+1'

Skytteholms IP, Stockholm
Referee: Walter Altmann (Austria)

13 November 2021
13:00

England	0–0	Switzerland
	Report

Skytteholms IP, Stockholm
Referee: Ioannis Papadopoulos (Greece)
13 November 2021
18:30

Sweden	2–0	Andorra
Qasem 9'; Montenegro Burgos 48' (o.g.)	Report

Skytteholms IP, Stockholm
Referee: Walter Altmann (Austria)

16 November 2021
18:00

Andorra	0–6	Switzerland
	Report	de Carvalho 7', 43', 45'; Willimann 33' (pen.); Fink 36'; Muhlethaler 65'

Grimsta IP, Bromma
Referee: Vitālijs Spasjoņņikovs (Latvia)
16 November 2021
18:00

Sweden	0–2	England
	Report	Scarlett 6' (pen.); Colwill 65'

Skytteholms IP, Stockholm
Referee: Ioannis Papadopoulos (Greece)

==== Group 2 ====
Pos	Team	Pld	W	D	L	GF	GA	GD	Pts	Qualification
1	Russia	3	3	0	0	9	1	+8	**9**	Elite round
2	Germany	3	1	1	1	6	5	+1	**4**	Elite round
3	Greece (H)	3	0	2	1	1	2	−1	**2**	
4	Faroe Islands	3	0	1	2	1	9	−8	**1**	

Source: UEFA
Rules for classification: Tiebreakers
(H) Hosts
10 November 2021
13:00 (14:00 EET)

Germany	4–1	Faroe Islands
Kesik 3'; Gedikli 73'; Kade 79'; Sieb 90'	Report	Samuelsen 53'

Pampeloponnisiako Stadium, Patras
Referee: Daniyar Sakhi (Kazakhstan)
10 November 2021
14:00 (15:00 EET)

Russia	1–0	Greece
Gladyshev 71'	Report

Papacharalambeio Ethniko Stadio Nafpaktou, Nafpaktos
Referee: Gergo Bogár (Hungary)

13 November 2021
13:00 (14:00 EET)

Germany	1–3	Russia
Gürpüz 90+1'	Report	Sokolov 40'; Gladyshev 47'; Bagrintsev 70'

Pampeloponnisiako Stadium, Patras
Referee: Andrew Madley (England)
13 November 2021
14:00 (15:00 EET)

Greece	0–0	Faroe Islands
	Report

Papacharalabeio Ethniko Stadio Nafpaktou, Nafpaktos
Referee: Gergo Bogár (Hungary)

16 November 2021
14:00 (15:00 EET)

Faroe Islands	0–5	Russia
	Report	Bagrintsev 5'; Pinyayev 71', 79'; Gladyshev 84'; Savitskiy 90+4'

Pampeloponnisiako Stadium, Patras
Referee: Daniyar Sakhi (Kazakhstan)
16 November 2021
14:00 (15:00 EET)

Greece	1–1	Germany
Koutsias 62' (pen.)	Report	Kade 49'

Papacharalabeio Ethniko Stadio Nafpaktou, Nafpaktos
Referee: Andrew Madley (England)

==== Group 3 ====
Pos	Team	Pld	W	D	L	GF	GA	GD	Pts	Qualification
1	Hungary (H)	3	2	1	0	5	2	+3	**7**	Elite round
2	Austria	3	1	2	0	6	2	+4	**5**	Elite round
3	Belarus	3	1	1	1	3	3	0	**4**	
4	Estonia	3	0	0	3	0	7	−7	**0**	

Source: UEFA
Rules for classification: Tiebreakers
(H) Hosts
6 October 2021
15:30

Austria	4–0	Estonia
Huskovic 2'; Veratschnig 60'; Jasic 65'; Coco 73'	Report

Gyirmóti Stadion, Győr
Referee: Helgi Mikael Jónasson (Iceland)
6 October 2021
20:00

Belarus	1–2	Hungary
Zinovich 62'	Report	Sztojka 19' (pen.); Németh 49'

ETO Park, Győr
Referee: Goga Kikacheishvili (Georgia)

9 October 2021
15:30

Austria	1–1	Belarus
Wiesinger 45+3'	Report	Latykhov 83' (pen.)

ETO Park, Győr
Referee: Peter Bankes (England)
9 October 2021
17:45

Hungary	2–0	Estonia
Sztojka 73', 81' (pen.)	Report

Gyirmóti Stadion, Győr
Referee: Helgi Mikael Jónasson (Iceland)

12 October 2021
15:00

Estonia	0–1	Belarus
	Report	Latykhov 74' (pen.)

Gyirmóti Stadion, Győr
Referee: Goga Kikacheishvili (Georgia)
12 October 2021
15:00

Hungary	1–1	Austria
Szendrei 34'	Report	Huskovic 40'

ETO Park, Győr
Referee: Peter Bankes (England)

==== Group 4 ====
Pos	Team	Pld	W	D	L	GF	GA	GD	Pts	Qualification
1	Netherlands	3	3	0	0	13	1	+12	**9**	Elite round
2	Israel (H)	3	2	0	1	8	4	+4	**6**	Elite round
3	Cyprus	3	0	1	2	2	8	−6	**1**	
4	Moldova	3	0	1	2	2	12	−10	**1**	

Source: UEFA
Rules for classification: Tiebreakers
(H) Hosts
10 November 2021
11:00 (12:00 IST)

Netherlands	4–0	Moldova
Ünüvar 24' (pen.); Emegha 27', 56' (pen.); Simons 43'	Report

Shefayim National Team Complex, Shefayim
Referee: Luca Barbeno (San Marino)
10 November 2021
18:00 (19:00 IST)

Cyprus	0–1	Israel
	Report	Abed-Kassus 77'

Netanya Stadium, Netanya
Referee: Rauf Jabarov (Azerbaijan)

13 November 2021
11:00 (12:00 IST)

Netherlands	5–0	Cyprus
De Jong 19', 29'; Kotsonis 40' (o.g.); Van Brederode 57'; Simons 59'	Report

Shefayim National Team Complex, Shefayim
Referee: Juri Frischer (Estonia)
13 November 2021
18:40 (19:40 IST)

Israel	6–0	Moldova
Senior 6'; Turgeman 27'; Gloukh 75'; Abed-Kassus 81', 90+4'; Muche 89' (pen.)	Report

Netanya Stadium, Netanya
Referee: Luca Barbeno (San Marino)

16 November 2021
16:00 (17:00 IST)

Moldova	2–2	Cyprus
Forov 45'; Fratea 83' (pen.)	Report	Marneros 55'; Christou 75'

Shefayim National Team Complex, Shefayim
Referee: Rauf Jabarov (Azerbaijan)
16 November 2021
16:00 (17:00 IST)

Israel	1–4	Netherlands
Ibrahim Salman 36'	Report	Jimenez 11'; Emegha 45+3'; Simons 54' (pen.); De Jong 66'

Netanya Stadium, Netanya
Referee: Juri Frischer (Estonia)

==== Group 5 ====
Pos	Team	Pld	W	D	L	GF	GA	GD	Pts	Qualification
1	Ukraine	3	2	1	0	8	5	+3	**7**	Elite round
2	Finland	3	2	0	1	5	3	+2	**6**	Elite round
3	Poland (H)	3	1	1	1	7	5	+2	**4**	
4	Malta	3	0	0	3	2	9	−7	**0**	

Source: UEFA
Rules for classification: Tiebreakers
(H) Hosts
6 October 2021
12:00

Ukraine	4–2	Malta
Khromey 13' (pen.); Yarmolyuk 36'; Shostak 55', 65'	Report	Cross 7'; Borg 58'

Plewiska Stadium, Plewiska
Referee: Dragomir Draganov (Bulgaria)
6 October 2021
18:00

Finland	3–1	Poland
Terho 21'; Hyryläinen 45+1'; Salomaa 87'	Report	Buksa 67' (pen.)

Stadion Miejski, Grodzisk Wielkopolski
Referee: Marian Alexandru Barbu (Romania)

9 October 2021
12:00

Ukraine	2–1	Finland
Yarmolyuk 36'; Losenko 75' (pen.)	Report	Nikki 21'

Plewiska Stadium, Plewiska
Referee: Aleksandrs Anufrijevs (Latvia)
9 October 2021
15:30

Poland	4–0	Malta
Bukowski 20'; Hoyo-Kowalski 37'; Buksa 81' (pen.); Starzynski 90+3'	Report

Swarzędz, Swarzędz
Referee: Dragomir Draganov (Bulgaria)

12 October 2021
13:00

Malta	0–1	Finland
	Report	Terho 12'

Swarzędz, Swarzędz
Referee: Marian Alexandru Barbu (Romania)
12 October 2021
13:00

Poland	2–2	Ukraine
Buksa 12' (pen.), 31'	Report	Yarmolyuk 45+2' (pen.); Udod 83'

Stadion Miejski, Grodzisk Wielkopolski
Referee: Aleksandrs Anufrijevs (Latvia)

==== Group 6 ====
Pos	Team	Pld	W	D	L	GF	GA	GD	Pts	Qualification
1	Bosnia and Herzegovina	3	2	1	0	7	1	+6	**7**	Elite round
2	Republic of Ireland	3	2	1	0	6	3	+3	**7**	Elite round
3	Montenegro	3	1	0	2	3	7	−4	**3**	
4	Bulgaria (H)	3	0	0	3	0	5	−5	**0**	

Source: UEFA
Rules for classification: Tiebreakers
(H) Hosts
10 November 2021
13:30 (14:30 EET)

Bosnia and Herzegovina	2–0	Bulgaria
Čuić 35', 69' (pen.)	Report

Albena 1, Albena
Referee: Denys Shurman (Ukraine)
10 November 2021
13:30 (14:30 EET)

Republic of Ireland	3–2	Montenegro
Armstrong 52', 77'; Kenny 56'	Report	Curtis 90+1' (o.g.); Dašić 90+2'

Druzhba, Dobrich
Referee: Kai Erik Steen (Norway)

13 November 2021
13:30 (14:30 EET)

Bulgaria	0–1	Montenegro
	Report	Krivokapić 62'

Albena 1, Albena
Referee: Kai Erik Steen (Norway)
13 November 2021
13:30 (14:30 EET)

Republic of Ireland	1–1	Bosnia and Herzegovina
Kenny 26'	Report	Kahvić 43'

Druzhba, Dobrich
Referee: Morten Krogh (Denmark)

16 November 2021
13:30 (14:30 EET)

Bulgaria	0–2	Republic of Ireland
	Report	Kenny 24' (pen.); Roughan 82'

Albena 1, Albena
Referee: Denys Shurman (Ukraine)
16 November 2021
13:30 (14:30 EET)

Montenegro	0–4	Bosnia and Herzegovina
	Report	Šakota 17'; Kahvić 47'; Čuić 58'; Bristrić 72'

Druzhba, Dobrich
Referee: Morten Krogh (Denmark)

==== Group 7 ====
Pos	Team	Pld	W	D	L	GF	GA	GD	Pts	Qualification
1	France	3	3	0	0	8	1	+7	**9**	Elite round
2	Serbia	3	1	1	1	5	5	0	**4**	Elite round
3	Albania (H)	3	1	1	1	5	7	−2	**4**	
4	North Macedonia	3	0	0	3	2	7	−5	**0**	

Source: UEFA
Rules for classification: Tiebreakers
(H) Hosts
10 November 2021
12:00

North Macedonia	1–2	Serbia
Feta 78'	Report	Ajdar 56' (pen.), 65'

Elbasan Arena, Elbasan
Referee: David Fuxman (Israel)
10 November 2021
14:00

France	4–0	Albania
Virginius 28'; Abline 35', 40'; Tchaouna 64' (pen.)	Report

Arena Egnatia, Rrogozhinë
Referee: Vladimir Moskalyov (Russia)

13 November 2021
12:00

France	2–0	North Macedonia
Abline 14'; Virginius 25'	Report

Arena Egnatia, Rrogozhinë
Referee: Vladimir Moskalyov (Russia)
13 November 2021
14:00

Serbia	2–2	Albania
Mituljikić 42'; Lazetić 77'	Report	Nerguti 84'; Shpendi 88'

Elbasan Arena, Elbasan
Referee: Pavel Orel (Czech Republic)

16 November 2021
14:00

Albania	3–1	North Macedonia
Mata 19' (pen.); Pjeshka 48'; Bibo 50'	Report	Talakov 45+1'

Elbasan Arena, Elbasan
Referee: David Fuxman (Israel)
16 November 2021
14:00

Serbia	1–2	France
Ajdar 32'	Report	Tchaouna 3'; Abline 90+5'

Arena Egnatia, Rrogozhinë
Referee: Pavel Orel (Czech Republic)

==== Group 8 ====
Pos	Team	Pld	W	D	L	GF	GA	GD	Pts	Qualification
1	Belgium	3	2	1	0	12	4	+8	**7**	Elite round
2	Spain	3	2	1	0	10	3	+7	**7**	Elite round
3	Azerbaijan	3	1	0	2	3	11	−8	**3**	
4	Luxembourg (H)	3	0	0	3	2	9	−7	**0**	

Source: UEFA
Rules for classification: Tiebreakers
(H) Hosts
10 November 2021
18:00

Azerbaijan	1–5	Belgium
Agayev 27'	Report	Bakayoko 34'; Rommens 36'; Stroeykens 70'; Oyen 73'; Damadayev 85' (o.g.)

Terrain Poetz, Wiltz
Referee: Luka Bilbija (Bosnia and Herzegovina)
10 November 2021
18:00

Spain	2–1	Luxembourg
Jiménez 18'; Serrano 57'	Report	Jonathans 6'

Terrain Bousbierg, Bissen
Referee: Robert Ian Jenkins (Wales)

13 November 2021
18:00

Belgium	5–1	Luxembourg
Sandra 25', 36', 71'; Oyen 40'; Descotte 47'	Report	Elshan 68'

Terrain Poetz, Wiltz
Referee: Robert Ian Jenkins (Wales)
13 November 2021
18:00

Spain	6–0	Azerbaijan
Torre 23', 69'; Serrano 35'; Martinez 71'; Rodriguez 76'; Moleiro 90+2'	Report

Terrain Bousbierg, Bissen
Referee: David Coote (England)

16 November 2021
18:00

Luxembourg	0–2	Azerbaijan
	Report	Janiyev 23'; Bakhshali 77'

Terrain Poetz, Wiltz
Referee: Luka Bilbija (Bosnia and Herzegovina)
16 November 2021
18:00

Belgium	2–2	Spain
Moleiro 56' (o.g.); Descotte 90+3'	Report	Serrano 8', 54'

Terrain Bousbierg, Bissen
Referee: David Coote (England)

==== Group 9 ====
Pos	Team	Pld	W	D	L	GF	GA	GD	Pts	Qualification
1	Turkey (H)	3	3	0	0	9	3	+6	**9**	Elite round
2	Romania	3	2	0	1	7	4	+3	**6**	Elite round
3	Latvia	3	1	0	2	3	3	0	**3**	
4	San Marino	3	0	0	3	1	10	−9	**0**	

Source: UEFA
Rules for classification: Tiebreakers
(H) Hosts
10 November 2021
11:00 (12:00 EET)

Latvia	0–1	Romania
	Report	Bodișteanu 43'

Arslan Zeki Demirci Spor Kompleksi 2, Manavgat
Referee: Thomas Gary Owen (Wales)
10 November 2021
15:00 (16:00 EET)

Turkey	3–1	San Marino
Şahindere 39', 84'; Altunbas 52'	Report	Cola 21'

Arslan Zeki Demirci Spor Kompleksi 1, Manavgat
Referee: Juxhin Xhaja (Albania)

13 November 2021
11:00 (12:00 EET)

Romania	5–0	San Marino
Burnete 11'; Hofman 15'; Tănasă 57'; Bodișteanu 62'; Chirițoiu 90+3' (pen.)	Report

Arslan Zeki Demirci Spor Kompleksi 2, Manavgat
Referee: Juxhin Xhaja (Albania)
13 November 2021
15:00 (16:00 EET)

Turkey	2–1	Latvia
Altunbaș 53'; Abay 69'	Report	Raščevskis 90+1'

Arslan Zeki Demirci Spor Kompleksi 1, Manavgat
Referee: Bram Van Driessche (Belgium)

16 November 2021
15:00 (16:00 EET)

San Marino	0–2	Latvia
	Report	Lizunovs 22'; Krancmanis 26'

Arslan Zeki Demirci Spor Kompleksi 2, Manavgat
Referee: Thomas Gary Owen (Wales)
16 November 2021
15:00 (16:00 EET)

Romania	1–4	Turkey
Pantea 7' (pen.)	Report	Gergely 29' (o.g.); Cebeci 35'; Yaldır 44'; Kaplan 83'

Arslan Zeki Demirci Spor Kompleksi 1, Manavgat
Referee: Bram Van Driessche (Belgium)

==== Group 10 ====
Pos	Team	Pld	W	D	L	GF	GA	GD	Pts	Qualification
1	Georgia	3	2	1	0	2	0	+2	**7**	Elite round
2	Norway (H)	3	2	0	1	8	1	+7	**6**	Elite round
3	Wales	3	1	1	1	3	5	−2	**4**	
4	Kosovo	3	0	0	3	0	7	−7	**0**	

Source: UEFA
Rules for classification: Tiebreakers
(H) Hosts
6 October 2021
13:00

Norway	3–0	Kosovo
Fiabema 44' (pen.), 66', 75'	Report

Sandefjord Arena, Sandefjord
Referee: Amine Kourgheli (Belarus)
6 October 2021
16:00

Wales	0–0	Georgia
	Report

Fram Stadion, Larvik
Referee: Michal Ocenáš (Slovakia)

9 October 2021
13:00

Norway	5–0	Wales
Bobb 44'; Jatta 50'; Holm 52'; Fiabema 63'; Arnstad 79'	Report

Sandefjord Arena, Sandefjord
Referee: Duje Strukan (Croatia)
9 October 2021
16:00

Georgia	1–0	Kosovo
O. Mamageishvili 52'	Report

Fram Stadion, Larvik
Referee: Amine Kourgheli (Belarus)

12 October 2021
15:00

Kosovo	0–3	Wales
	Report	Hughes 16' (pen.), 57'; Harris 45+3'

Bugårdsparken, Sandefjord
Referee: Michal Ocenáš (Slovakia)
12 October 2021
15:00

Georgia	1–0	Norway
G. Mamageishvili 26'	Report

Fram Stadion, Larvik
Referee: Duje Strukan (Croatia)

==== Group 11 ====
Pos	Team	Pld	W	D	L	GF	GA	GD	Pts	Qualification
1	Croatia (H)	3	2	1	0	10	1	+9	**7**	Elite round
2	Armenia	3	2	0	1	4	4	0	**6**	Elite round
3	Scotland	3	1	1	1	6	4	+2	**4**	Elite round
4	Gibraltar	3	0	0	3	0	11	−11	**0**	

Source: UEFA
Rules for classification: Tiebreakers
(H) Hosts
10 November 2021
11:00

Armenia	3–2	Scotland
Hayrapetyan 62'; Minasyan 64'; Serobyan 71'	Report	Brooks 12' (pen.); Smith 43'

Stadion Lučko, Lučko
Referee: Milovan Milačić (Montenegro)
10 November 2021
12:00

Croatia	7–0	Gibraltar
Frigan 4', 45+2', 86'; Špeljak 20'; Stojković 30'; Lisica 56'; Ivanović 64'	Report

Stadion Branko Čavlović-Čavlek, Karlovac
Referee: Mohammad Al-Emara (Finland)

13 November 2021
11:00

Scotland	3–0	Gibraltar
Lowry 26'; Apter 45'; Butterfield 77'	Report

Stadion Lučko, Lučko
Referee: Mohammad Al-Emara (Finland)
13 November 2021
12:00

Croatia	2–0	Armenia
Špeljak 19'; Frigan 27'	Report

Stadion Branko Čavlović-Čavlek, Karlovac
Referee: António Nobre (Portugal)

16 November 2021
12:00

Gibraltar	0–1	Armenia
	Report	Arakelyan 5'

Stadion Lučko, Lučko
Referee: Milovan Milačić (Montenegro)
16 November 2021
12:00

Scotland	1–1	Croatia
Lowry 90+1'	Report	Ivanović 29'

Stadion Branko Čavlović-Čavlek, Karlovac
Referee: António Nobre (Portugal)

==== Group 12 ====
Pos	Team	Pld	W	D	L	GF	GA	GD	Pts	Qualification
1	Italy	3	3	0	0	8	1	+7	**9**	Elite round
2	Iceland	3	2	0	1	5	5	0	**6**	Elite round
3	Lithuania	3	0	1	2	2	5	−3	**1**	
4	Slovenia (H)	3	0	1	2	3	7	−4	**1**	

Source: UEFA
Rules for classification: Tiebreakers
(H) Hosts
6 October 2021
15:30

Iceland	3–1	Slovenia
Haraldsson 1'; Oskarsson 19', 55'	Report	Gavrić 53'

TŠC Trate Gornja Radgona, Gornja Radgona
Referee: Arda Kardeşler (Turkey)
6 October 2021
15:30

Italy	2–0	Lithuania
Miretti 45'; Ngbesso 90+2'	Report

ŠRC Bakovci Stadium, Bakovci
Referee: Kári á Høvdanum (Faroe Islands)

9 October 2021
15:30

Slovenia	1–1	Lithuania
Černe 26'	Report	Kučys 89' (pen.)

TŠC Trate Gornja Radgona, Gornja Radgona
Referee: Arda Kardeşler (Turkey)
9 October 2021
15:30

Italy	3–0	Iceland
Gnonto 4'; Mancini 49'; Fabbian 67'	Report

ŠRC Bakovci Stadium, Bakovci
Referee: Kristoffer Karlsson (Sweden)

12 October 2021
15:30

Lithuania	1–2	Iceland
Gineitis 46'	Report	Óskarsson 64' (pen.); Mikaelsson 71'

Športni park Radenci, Radenci
Referee: Kári á Høvdanum (Faroe Islands)
12 October 2021
15:30

Slovenia	1–3	Italy
Bunić 85'	Report	Zajšek 7' (o.g.); Fabbian 19'; Gnonto 56'

TŠC Trate Gornja Radgona, Gornja Radgona
Referee: Kristoffer Karlsson (Sweden)

==== Group 13 ====
Pos	Team	Pld	W	D	L	GF	GA	GD	Pts	Qualification
1	Denmark	3	2	1	0	8	3	+5	**7**	Elite round
2	Czech Republic (H)	3	2	1	0	6	1	+5	**7**	Elite round
3	Northern Ireland	3	1	0	2	2	5	−3	**3**	
4	Kazakhstan	3	0	0	3	3	10	−7	**0**	

Source: UEFA
Rules for classification: Tiebreakers
(H) Hosts
6 October 2021
15:00

Northern Ireland	0–2	Denmark
	Report	Haarbo 64'; Larsen 81' (pen.)

Stovky, Frýdek-Místek
Referee: Balázs Berke (Hungary)
6 October 2021
18:00

Czech Republic	3–0	Kazakhstan
Vecheta 18', 51'; Vydra 60'	Report

Městský stadion, Opava
Referee: Genc Nuza (Kosovo)

9 October 2021
15:00

Denmark	5–2	Kazakhstan
Bierith 6'; Rasmussen 22' (pen.); Chukwuani 64', 69'; Breum 90+2'	Report	Kenzhebek 49'; Khalmatov 71'

Bazaly, Slezská Ostrava
Referee: Genc Nuza (Kosovo)
9 October 2021
15:00

Czech Republic	2–0	Northern Ireland
Hadaš 23'; Večerka 56'	Report

Stovky, Frýdek-Místek
Referee: Horatiu Fesnic (Romania)

12 October 2021
15:00

Denmark	1–1	Czech Republic
Breum 50'	Report	Hadaš 67'

Městský stadion, Opava
Referee: Horatiu Fesnic (Romania)
12 October 2021
15:00

Kazakhstan	1–2	Northern Ireland
Tkachenko 69'	Report	McGuckin 68'; Conaty 74'

Bazaly, Slezská Ostrava
Referee: Balázs Berke (Hungary)

=== Ranking of third-placed teams ===
To determine the best third-placed team from the qualifying round which advanced to the elite round, only the results of the third-placed teams against the first and second-placed teams in their group were taken into account.

Pos	Grp	Team	Pld	W	D	L	GF	GA	GD	Pts	Qualification
1	11	Scotland	2	0	1	1	3	4	−1	1	Elite round
2	3	Belarus	2	0	1	1	2	3	−1	1	
3	1	Switzerland	2	0	1	1	1	2	−1	1 (Note: Disciplinary points: Switzerland −4, Greece −12.)	
4	2	Greece	2	0	1	1	1	2	−1	1	
5	5	Poland	2	0	1	1	3	5	−2	1	
6	7	Albania	2	0	1	1	2	6	−4	1	
7	10	Wales	2	0	1	1	0	5	−5	1	
8	9	Latvia	2	0	0	2	1	3	−2	0	
9	12	Lithuania	2	0	0	2	1	4	−3	0	
10	13	Northern Ireland	2	0	0	2	0	4	−4	0	
11	6	Montenegro	2	0	0	2	2	7	−5	0	
12	4	Cyprus	2	0	0	2	0	6	−6	0	
13	8	Azerbaijan	2	0	0	2	1	11	−10	0	

Source: UEFA
Rules for classification: 1) points; 2) goal difference; 3) goals scored; 4) disciplinary points; 5) coefficient; 6) drawing of lots.

== Elite round ==
=== Draw ===
The draw for the elite round was held on 8 December 2021, at the UEFA headquarters in Nyon, Switzerland.

The teams were seeded according to their positions and then results (i.e. group winners were seeded higher than second-placed teams, the best third-placed team was seeded at the bottom) in the qualifying round. Portugal, which received a bye to the elite round, was automatically seeded into Pot A. Each group contained one team from Pot A, one team from Pot B, one team from Pot C, and one team from Pot D. Winners and runners-up from the same qualifying round group could not be drawn in the same group, but the best third-placed teams could be drawn in the same group as winners or runners-up from the same qualifying round group.

Pos	Grp	Team	Pld	W	D	L	GF	GA	GD	Pts	Seeding
1	—	Portugal	0	0	0	0	0	0	0	0	Pot A
2	4	Netherlands	3	3	0	0	13	1	+12	9	Pot A
3	2	Russia	3	3	0	0	9	1	+8	9	Pot A
4	7	France	3	3	0	0	8	1	+7	9 (Note: Disciplinary points: France −6, Italy −10.)	Pot A
5	12	Italy	3	3	0	0	8	1	+7	9	Pot A
6	9	Turkey	3	3	0	0	9	3	+6	9	Pot A
7	11	Croatia	3	2	1	0	10	1	+9	7	Pot A
8	8	Belgium	3	2	1	0	12	4	+8	7	Pot B
9	6	Bosnia and Herzegovina	3	2	1	0	7	1	+6	7	Pot B
10	1	England	3	2	1	0	6	0	+6	7	Pot B
11	13	Denmark	3	2	1	0	8	3	+5	7	Pot B
12	5	Ukraine	3	2	1	0	8	5	+3	7	Pot B
13	3	Hungary	3	2	1	0	5	2	+3	7	Pot B
14	10	Georgia	3	2	1	0	2	0	+2	7	Pot B
15	8	Spain	3	2	1	0	10	3	+7	7	Pot C
16	13	Czech Republic	3	2	1	0	6	1	+5	7	Pot C
17	6	Republic of Ireland	3	2	1	0	6	3	+3	7	Pot C
18	10	Norway	3	2	0	1	8	1	+7	6	Pot C
19	4	Israel	3	2	0	1	8	4	+4	6	Pot C
20	9	Romania	3	2	0	1	7	4	+3	6	Pot C
21	5	Finland	3	2	0	1	5	3	+2	6	Pot C
22	1	Sweden	3	2	0	1	4	3	+1	6	Pot D
23	12	Iceland	3	2	0	1	5	5	0	6	Pot D
24	11	Armenia	3	2	0	1	4	4	0	6	Pot D
25	3	Austria	3	1	2	0	6	2	+4	5	Pot D
26	2	Germany	3	1	1	1	6	5	+1	4	Pot D
27	7	Serbia	3	1	1	1	5	5	0	4	Pot D
28	11	Scotland (Y)	3	1	1	1	6	4	+2	4	Pot D

Source: UEFA
Rules for classification: 1) group position; 2) points; 3) goal difference; 4) goals scored; 5) disciplinary points; 6) coefficient ranking; 7) drawing of lots.
(Y) Third-placed teams from qualifying round (may be drawn with teams from same qualifying round group)

=== Groups ===
The elite round group stage was completed on 23, 26 and 29 March 2022, and 1, 4 and 7 June 2022.

==== Group 1 ====
Pos	Team	Pld	W	D	L	GF	GA	GD	Pts	Qualification
1	Israel	3	2	1	0	4	1	+3	7	Final tournament
2	Hungary (H)	3	1	1	1	4	2	+2	4	
3	Scotland	3	1	0	2	2	5	−3	3	
4	Turkey	3	1	0	2	4	6	−2	3	

Source: UEFA
Rules for classification: Qualification tiebreakers
(H) Hosts
23 March 2022
16:00

Turkey	1–2	Scotland
Akgün 66'	Report	Lowry 54', 70' (pen.)

Ménfői úti Stadion, Győr
Referee: Christian-Petru Ciochirca (Austria)
23 March 2022
19:30

Israel	0–0	Hungary
	Report

ETO Park, Győr
Referee: Philip Farrugia (Malta)

26 March 2022
16:00

Turkey	1–3	Israel
Elmaz 42' (pen.)	Report	Turgeman 32', 35'; Edri 66'

ETO Park, Győr
Referee: Mohammad Al-Emara (Finland)
26 March 2022
19:45

Hungary	3–0	Scotland
Németh 31' (pen.), 36'; R. Horváth 74'	Report

Ménfői úti Stadion, Győr
Referee: Philip Farrugia (Malta)

29 March 2022
17:45

Scotland	0–1	Israel
	Report	Revivo 88'

Ménfői úti Stadion, Győr
Referee: Christian-Petru Ciochirca (Austria)
29 March 2022
17:45

Hungary	1–2	Turkey
Benczenleitner 22'	Report	Akgün 81'; Elmaz 90+3' (pen.)

ETO Park, Győr
Referee: Mohammad Al-Emara (Finland)

==== Group 2 ====
Pos	Team	Pld	W	D	L	GF	GA	GD	Pts	Qualification
1	France (H)	3	2	0	1	7	2	+5	6 (Note: Head-to-head goals: France 2, Bosnia and Herzegovina 2, Czech Republic 1. Head-to-head points: France 3, Bosnia and Herzegovina 0.)	Final tournament
2	Bosnia and Herzegovina	3	2	0	1	5	4	+1	6	
3	Czech Republic	3	2	0	1	4	2	+2	6	
4	Sweden	3	0	0	3	3	11	−8	0	

Source: UEFA
Rules for classification: Qualification tiebreakers
(H) Hosts
Notes:
23 March 2022
15:00

France	5–0	Sweden
Toure 12'; Cho 18', 66'; Wahi 60', 69'	Report

Stade André Darrigade, Dax
Referee: Sebastian Gishamer (Austria)
23 March 2022
18:00

Czech Republic	0–1	Bosnia and Herzegovina
	Report	Mehmedović 60'

Plaine des Sports, Saint-Paul-lès-Dax
Referee: Volen Chinkov (Bulgaria)

26 March 2022
15:00

France	0–1	Czech Republic
	Report	Vydra 71'

Plaine des Sports, Saint-Paul-lès-Dax
Referee: Lukas Fähndrich (Switzerland)
26 March 2022
18:00

Bosnia and Herzegovina	3–2	Sweden
Šakota 23'; Kahvić 34'; Bristrić 60'	Report	Abbas Ayari 33'; Wilhelmsson 45+2'

Stade André Darrigade, Dax
Referee: Sebastian Gishamer (Austria)

29 March 2022
15:00

Sweden	1–3	Czech Republic
Swedberg 41'	Report	Jurásek 39'; Alijagić 66', 87'

Plaine des Sports, Saint-Paul-lès-Dax
Referee: Volen Chinkov (Bulgaria)
29 March 2022
15:00

Bosnia and Herzegovina	1–2	France
Čuić 54'	Report	Cissé 83'; Nzouango 85'

Stade André Darrigade, Dax
Referee: Lukas Fähndrich (Switzerland)

==== Group 3 ====
Pos	Team	Pld	W	D	L	GF	GA	GD	Pts	Qualification
1	England (H)	3	3	0	0	9	1	+8	9	Final tournament
2	Portugal	3	2	0	1	8	3	+5	6	
3	Republic of Ireland	3	1	0	2	6	7	−1	3	
4	Armenia	3	0	0	3	0	12	−12	0	

Source: UEFA
Rules for classification: Qualification tiebreakers
(H) Hosts
23 March 2022
14:00

Portugal	4–0	Armenia
Djaló 35' (pen.); Chermiti 49'; Nuno Félix 51'; Moreira 63'	Report

St George's Park - Pitch 4, Burton-on-Trent
Referee: Nathan Verboomen (Belgium)
23 March 2022
20:30

Republic of Ireland	1–3	England
Abankwah 39'	Report	Scarlett 5'; Chukwuemeka 42', 47'

Bescot Stadium, Walsall
Referee: Igor Pajac (Croatia)

26 March 2022
15:00

England	4–0	Armenia
Devine 6'; Manukyan 38' (o.g.); Quansah 56'; Edozie 76'	Report

New York Stadium, Rotherham
Referee: Peter Kjaesgaard (Denmark)
26 March 2022
20:30

Portugal	4–1	Republic of Ireland
Chermiti 78', 90+5'; Silva 84'; Joelson 90+2'	Report	Kenny 25'

St George's Park - Pitch 4, Burton-on-Trent
Referee: Igor Pajac (Croatia)

29 March 2022
20:30

Armenia	0–4	Republic of Ireland
	Report	Moran 37'; Hayes 43'; Garcia McNulty 75'; Caffrey 86'

St George's Park - Pitch 4, Burton-on-Trent
Referee: Peter Kjaesgaard (Denmark)
29 March 2022
20:30

England	2–0	Portugal
Scarlett 10', 40' (pen.)	Report

Technique Stadium, Chesterfield
Referee: Nathan Verboomen (Belgium)

==== Group 4 ====
Pos	Team	Pld	W	D	L	GF	GA	GD	Pts	Qualification
1	Romania	3	2	0	1	7	5	+2	6	Final tournament
2	Iceland	3	1	1	1	5	3	+2	4	
3	Georgia	3	1	1	1	3	6	−3	4	
4	Croatia (H)	3	1	0	2	3	4	−1	3	

Source: UEFA
Rules for classification: Qualification tiebreakers
(H) Hosts
23 March 2022
12:00

Croatia	2–1	Iceland
Stojković 13'; Cvijanović 75'	Report	Óskarsson 33'

Stadion Branko Čavlović-Čavlek, Karlovac
Referee: Kristoffer Karlsson (Sweden)
23 March 2022
15:30

Romania	5–1	Georgia
Chirițoiu 11'; Dănuleasa 31'; Pantea 45' (pen.); Ilie 47'; Rădăslăvescu 59'	Report	Abuashvili 39'

Stadion Radnik, Velika Gorica
Referee: Walter Altmann (Austria)

26 March 2022
12:00

Croatia	1–2	Romania
Špeljak 28'	Report	Chirițoiu 10'; Ilie 73' (pen.)

Stadion Branko Čavlović-Čavlek, Karlovac
Referee: Kristoffer Karlsson (Sweden)
26 March 2022
15:30

Georgia	1–1	Iceland
Dundua 73'	Report	Óskarsson 90+8' (pen.)

Stadion Radnik, Velika Gorica
Referee: Loukas Sotiriou (Cyprus)

29 March 2022
12:00

Iceland	3–0	Romania
Hoti 15', 60'; Sigurgeirsson 73'	Report

Stadion Radnik, Velika Gorica
Referee: Loukas Sotiriou (Cyprus)
29 March 2022
12:00

Georgia	1–0	Croatia
Mamageishvili 77'	Report

Stadion Branko Čavlović-Čavlek, Karlovac
Referee: Walter Altmann (Austria)

==== Group 5 ====
Pos	Team	Pld	W	D	L	GF	GA	GD	Pts	Qualification
1	Italy	3	2	1	0	8	2	+6	7	Final tournament
2	Belgium	3	1	1	1	5	5	0	4	
3	Finland (H)	3	1	0	2	2	7	−5	3	
4	Germany	3	0	2	1	4	5	−1	2	

Source: UEFA
Rules for classification: Qualification tiebreakers
(H) Hosts
23 March 2022
11:30

Italy	2–2	Germany
Nasti 78'; Gnonto 80'	Report	Matanović 29'; Rhein 88'

Myyrmäki Stadium, Vantaa
Referee: Luis Godinho (Portugal)
23 March 2022
17:30

Finland	1–3	Belgium
Keskinen 90'	Report	Bakayoko 16'; Stroeykens 21' (pen.); Oyen 60'

Myyrmäki Stadium, Vantaa
Referee: Peter Kráľovič (Slovakia)

26 March 2022
11:30

Belgium	2–2	Germany
Oyen 85'; Audoor 89'	Report	Bobzien 6', 54'

Myyrmäki Stadium, Vantaa
Referee: Luis Godinho (Portugal)
26 March 2022
17:30

Italy	4–0	Finland
Miretti 22' (pen.); Gnonto 42', 43'; Casadei 74'	Report

Myyrmäki Stadium, Vantaa
Referee: Aleksandrs Anufrijevs (Latvia)

29 March 2022
17:30

Germany	0–1	Finland
	Report	Terho 14'

Helsinki Football Stadium, Helsinki
Referee: Aleksandrs Anufrijevs (Latvia)
29 March 2022
17:30

Belgium	0–2	Italy
	Report	Miretti 9'; Casadei 45'

Myyrmäki Stadium, Vantaa
Referee: Peter Kráľovič (Slovakia)

==== Group 6 ====
Pos	Team	Pld	W	D	L	GF	GA	GD	Pts	Qualification
1	Serbia	3	2	1	0	6	4	+2	7 (Note: Disciplinary points: Serbia −10, Ukraine −13.)	Final tournament
2	Ukraine	3	2	1	0	6	4	+2	7	
3	Norway	3	0	1	2	5	7	−2	1	
4	Netherlands (H)	3	0	1	2	3	5	−2	1	

Source: UEFA
Rules for classification: Qualification tiebreakers
(H) Hosts
Notes:
1 June 2022
16:00

Norway	2–3	Ukraine
Gulliksen 69' (pen.); Zafeiris 90+5'	Report	Yarmoliuk 47' (pen.); Sapuha 75'; Malysh 87'

Sportcomplex Varkenoord, Rotterdam
Attendance: 153
Referee: Aristotelis Diamantopoulos (Greece)
1 June 2022
19:00

Netherlands	1–2	Serbia
Ohio 39' (pen.)	Report	Lazetić 24'; Ratkov 77'

Yanmar Stadion, Almere
Attendance: 984
Referee: Ivaylo Stoyanov (Bulgaria)

4 June 2022
12:00

Ukraine	1–1	Serbia
Kvasnytsya 22'	Report	Ilić 18'

Sportpark Zegersloot, Alphen aan den Rijn
Referee: Ivaylo Stoyanov (Bulgaria)
4 June 2022
16:00

Netherlands	1–1	Norway
Caschili 9'	Report	Schjelderup 62'

Sportcomplex Varkenoord, Rotterdam
Referee: Gergo Bogár (Hungary)

7 June 2022
19:00

Serbia	3–2	Norway
Lazić 33'; Motika 36'; Ratkov 47'	Report	Eng 75'; Karlsbakk 82'

Sportpark Zegersloot, Alphen aan den Rijn
Referee: Aristotelis Diamantopoulos (Greece)
7 June 2022
19:00

Ukraine	2–1	Netherlands
Kozik 55'; Popov 90'	Report	Poku 15'

Sportcomplex Varkenoord, Rotterdam
Referee: Gergo Bogár (Hungary)

==== Group 7 ====
Pos	Team	Pld	W	D	L	GF	GA	GD	Pts	Qualification
1	Austria	2	1	1	0	4	2	+2	4	Final tournament
2	Spain (H)	2	0	2	0	5	5	0	2	
3	Denmark	2	0	1	1	3	5	−2	1	
4	Russia	0	0	0	0	0	0	0	0	Banned due to the invasion of Ukraine

Source: UEFA
Rules for classification: Qualification tiebreakers
(H) Hosts
23 March 2022
18:00

Spain	2–2	Austria
Artero 13'; Akhomach 22'	Report	Wydra 48'; Kanuric 68'

Estadi Olímpic Camilo Cano, La Nucía
Referee: Jonathan Lardot (Belgium)
23 March 2022
19:30

Russia	Cancelled	Denmark
	Report

Estadi Olímpic Camilo Cano, La Nucía

26 March 2022
18:00

Austria	2–0	Denmark
Fallmann 28'; Jasic 90+1'	Report

Estadi Olímpic Camilo Cano, La Nucía
Referee: David Fuxman (Israel)
26 March 2022
18:30

Russia	Cancelled	Spain
	Report

Estadi Olímpic Camilo Cano, La Nucía

29 March 2022
18:00

Denmark	3–3	Spain
Martinsen 30', 55'; Rasmussen 79' (pen.)	Report	Navarro 38'; Artero 43'; Zúñiga 50'

Estadio Municipal Guillermo Amor, Benidorm
Referee: Donald Robertson (Scotland)
29 March 2022
18:30

Austria	Cancelled	Russia
	Report

Estadi Olímpic Camilo Cano, La Nucía

== Qualified teams ==
The following eight teams qualified for the final tournament.

Team	Qualified as	Qualified on	Previous appearances in Under-19 Euro^{1} only U-19 era (since 2002)
Slovakia	Hosts	24 September 2019	1 (2002)
Romania	Elite round Group 4 winners	26 March 2022	1 (2011)
Italy	Elite round Group 5 winners	29 March 2022	7 (**2003**, 2004, 2008, 2010, 2016, 2018, 2019)
Israel	Elite round Group 1 winners	29 March 2022	1 (2014)
France	Elite round Group 2 winners	29 March 2022	11 (2003, **2005**, 2007, 2009, **2010**, 2012, 2013, 2015, **2016**, 2018, 2019)
England	Elite round Group 3 winners	29 March 2022	10 (2002, 2003, 2005, 2008, 2009, 2010, 2012, 2016, **2017**, 2018)
Austria	Elite round Group 7 winners	29 March 2022	7 (2003, 2006, 2007, 2010, 2014, 2015, 2016)
Serbia	Elite round Group 6 winners	7 June 2022	7 (2005^{2}, 2007, 2009, 2011, 2012, **2013**, 2014)

^{1} Bold indicates champions for that year. Italic indicates hosts for that year.
^{2} As Serbia and Montenegro

== Goalscorers ==
In the qualifying round, there were 248 goals scored in 78 matches, for an average of 3.18 goals per match. In the elite round, there were 125 goals scored in 39 matches, for an average of 3.21 goals per match. In total, there were 373 goals scored in 117 matches, for an average of 3.19 goals per match.

5 goals

- (Iceland) Orri Steinn Óskarsson
- (Italy) Wilfried Gnonto

4 goals

- (Belgium) Luca Oyen
- (Croatia) Matija Frigan
- (England) Dane Scarlett
- (France) Matthis Abline
- (Spain) Nico Serrano
- (Republic of Ireland) Johnny Kenny
- (Norway) Bryan Fiabema
- (Poland) Aleksander Buksa
- (Scotland) Alex Lowry
- (Ukraine) Yehor Yarmolyuk

3 goals

- (Belgium) Cisse Sandra
- (Bosnia and Herzegovina) Filip Čuić
- (Bosnia and Herzegovina) Aleksandar Kahvić
- (Croatia) Karlo Špeljak
- (England) Carney Chukwuemeka
- (Hungary) Dániel Németh
- (Hungary) Dominik Sztojka
- (Israel) Tai Abed
- (Israel) Dor Turgeman
- (Italy) Fabio Miretti
- (Netherlands) Fedde De Jong
- (Netherlands) Emanuel Emegha
- (Netherlands) Xavi Simons
- (Portugal) Youssef Chermiti
- (Romania) Andreas Chirițoiu
- (Russia) Yaroslav Gladyshev
- (Serbia) Ognjen Ajdar
- (Switzerland) Filipe de Carvalho

2 goals

- (Austria) Muharem Huskovic
- (Austria) Adis Jasic
- (Belarus) Dmitriy Latykhov
- (Belgium) Johan Bakayoko
- (Belgium) Anthony Descotte
- (Belgium) Mario Stroeykens
- (Bosnia and Herzegovina) Admir Bristrić
- (Bosnia and Herzegovina) Matej Šakota
- (Croatia) Franjo Ivanović
- (Croatia) Luka Stojković
- (Czech Republic) Matěj Hadaš
- (Czech Republic) Filip Vecheta
- (Czech Republic) Patrik Vydra
- (Denmark) Jakob Breum
- (Denmark) Tochi Chukwuani
- (Finland) Casper Terho
- (France) Mohamed-Ali Cho
- (France) Loum Tchaouna
- (France) Alan Virginius
- (France) Elye Wahi
- (Germany) Ben Bobzien
- (Germany) Anton Kade
- (Republic of Ireland) Sinclair Armstrong
- (Italy) Giovanni Fabbian
- (Romania) Ștefan Bodișteanu
- (Romania) Rareș Ilie
- (Romania) Alexandru Pantea
- (Russia) Eduard Bagrintsev
- (Russia) Sergei Pinyayev
- (Spain) Pablo Torre
- (Sweden) Ahmed Qasem
- (Switzerland) Bradley Fink
- (Turkey) Abdullah Şahindere
- (Turkey) Bartuğ Elmaz
- (Turkey) Metehan Altunbaş
- (Turkey) Tuğbey Akgün
- (Ukraine) Denys Shostak
- (Wales) Caleb Hughes

1 goal

- (Albania) Stiven Bibo
- (Albania) Asan Mata
- (Albania) Henrik Nerguti
- (Albania) Paulo Pjeshka
- (Albania) Cristian Shpendi
- (Armenia) Gor Arakelyan
- (Armenia) Spartak Hayrapetyan
- (Armenia) Hamlet Minasyan
- (Armenia) Artur Serobyan
- (Austria) Lorenzo Coco
- (Austria) Pascal Fallmann
- (Austria) Benjamin Kanuric
- (Austria) Nikolas Veratschnig
- (Austria) Nico Wiesinger
- (Austria) Philipp Wydra
- (Azerbaijan) Mahmud Agayev
- (Azerbaijan) Mehraj Bakhshali
- (Azerbaijan) Mirmovsum Janiyev
- (Belarus) Kirill Zinovich
- (Belgium) Lynnt Audoor
- (Belgium) Tuur Rommens
- (Bosnia and Herzegovina) Eldar Mehmedović
- (Croatia) Ivan Cvijanović
- (Croatia) Mateo Lisica
- (Cyprus) Constantinos Christou
- (Cyprus) Constantinos Marneros
- (Czech Republic) Dalibor Večerka
- (Denmark) Mika Bierith
- (Denmark) Daniel Bisgaard Haarbo
- (Denmark) Marinus Larsen
- (Denmark) Christian Rasmussen
- (England) Levi Colwill
- (England) Alfie Devine
- (England) Samuel Edozie
- (England) Samuel Iling-Junior
- (England) Jarell Quansah
- (Finland) Luka Hyryläinen
- (Finland) Topi Keskinen
- (Finland) Jesse Nikki
- (Finland) Henri Salomaa
- (France) Souleymane Toure
- (Faroe Islands) Áki Samuelsen
- (Germany) Emrehan Gedikli
- (Germany) Göktan Gürpüz
- (Germany) Mesut Kesik
- (Germany) Igor Matanović
- (Germany) Torben Rhein
- (Germany) Armindo Sieb
- (Georgia (country)) Giorgi Abuashvili
- (Georgia (country)) Tornike Dundua
- (Georgia (country)) Giza Mamageishvili
- (Georgia (country)) Otar Mamageishvili
- (Greece) Georgios Koutsias
- (Hungary) Rajmund Horváth
- (Hungary) Ákos Szendrei
- (Republic of Ireland) James Abankwah
- (Republic of Ireland) Evan Caffrey
- (Republic of Ireland) Cian Hayes
- (Republic of Ireland) Anselmo García MacNulty
- (Republic of Ireland) Andrew Moran
- (Republic of Ireland) Sean Roughan
- (Iceland) Hakon Arnar Haraldsson
- (Iceland) Hilmir Rafn Mikaelsson
- (Israel) Shon Edri
- (Israel) Oscar Gloukh
- (Israel) Ahmad Ibrahim
- (Israel) Noam Muche
- (Israel) Omer Senior
- (Italy) Cesare Casadei
- (Italy) Tommaso Mancini
- (Italy) Henoc Ngbesso
- (Kazakhstan) Galymshan Kenzhebek
- (Kazakhstan) Murojon Khalmatov
- (Kazakhstan) Egor Tkachenko
- (Latvia) Arturș Krancmanis
- (Latvia) Valerijș Lizunovs
- (Latvia) Oļġerts Raščevskis
- (Lithuania) Gvidas Gineitis
- (Lithuania) Armandas Kučys
- (Luxembourg) Leon Elshan
- (Luxembourg) David Jonathans
- (Moldova) Danila Forov
- (Moldova) Vladimir Fratea
- (North Macedonia) Behar Feta
- (North Macedonia) Martin Talakov
- (Malta) Brooklyn Borg
- (Malta) Nathan Cross
- (Montenegro) Jovan Dašić
- (Montenegro) Matija Krivokapić
- (Netherlands) Mylian Jimenez
- (Netherlands) Myron Van Brederode
- (Netherlands) Naci Ünüvar
- (Northern Ireland) Oisín Conaty
- (Northern Ireland) Ciaran McGuckin
- (Norway) Kristian Arnstad
- (Norway) Oscar Bobb
- (Norway) Tobias Fjeld Gulliksen
- (Norway) Odin Holm
- (Norway) Seedy Jatta
- (Norway) Christos Zafeiris
- (Poland) Adrian Bukowski
- (Poland) Daniel Hoyo-Kowalski
- (Poland) Piotr Starzynski
- (Portugal) Matchoi Djaló
- (Portugal) Nuno Félix
- (Portugal) Joelson
- (Portugal) Diego Moreira
- (Portugal) António Silva
- (Romania) Rareș Burnete
- (Romania) Gabriel Dănuleasa
- (Romania) Albert Hofman
- (Romania) Eduard Rădăslăvescu
- (Romania) Răzvan Tănasă
- (Russia) Ivan Savitskiy
- (Russia) Artem Sokolov
- (Scotland) Robert Apter
- (Scotland) Adam Brooks
- (Scotland) Luke Butterfield
- (Scotland) Liam Smith
- (San Marino) Mattia Cola
- (Serbia) Marko Lazetić
- (Serbia) Nikola Mituljikić
- (Spain) Ilias Akhomach
- (Spain) Ricard Artero
- (Spain) Alejandro Jiménez
- (Spain) Arnau Martinez
- (Spain) Alberto Moleiro
- (Spain) Miguel Rodriguez
- (Slovenia) Žan Bunić
- (Slovenia) Gašper Černe
- (Slovenia) Nemanja Gavrić
- (Sweden) Yasin Abbas Ayari
- (Sweden) Markus Björkqvist
- (Sweden) Oscar Wilhelmsson
- (Switzerland) Till Muhlethaler
- (Switzerland) Mauricio Willimann
- (Turkey) Ahmetcan Kaplan
- (Turkey) Polat Abay
- (Turkey) Polat Yaldır
- (Turkey) Süleyman Cebeci
- (Ukraine) Mykhaylo Khromey
- (Ukraine) Ivan Losenko
- (Ukraine) Navin Malysh
- (Ukraine) Marko Sapuha
- (Ukraine) Danylo Udod
- (Wales) Luke Harris

1 own goal

- (Andorra) Alessio Montenegro Burgos (against Sweden)
- (Armenia) Narek Manukyan (against England)
- (Azerbaijan) Suleyman Damadayev (against Belgium)
- (Cyprus) Fotis Kotsonis (against the Netherlands)
- (Republic of Ireland) Sam Curtis (against Montenegro)
- (Romania) Botond Gergely (against Turkey)
- (Spain) Alberto Moleiro (against Belgium)
- (Slovenia) Domen Zajšek (against Italy)

Source: UEFA.com
