= Večerka =

Večerka is a surname. Notable people with the surname include:

- Dalibor Večerka (born 2003), Czech footballer
- Radoslav Večerka (1928–2017), Czech linguist
