= Václav Machek =

Václav Machek may refer to:

- Václav Machek (cyclist) (1925–2017), Czech Olympic cyclist
- Václav Machek (linguist) (1894–1965), Czech linguist
