= Radoslav Večerka =

Czech linguist (1928–2017)

Radoslav Večerka (18 April 1928 – 18 December 2017) was a Czech linguist, university professor, journalist, editor and literary scholar active in the field of Slavic studies with a focus on paleography, comparative studies of Slavic languages and Slavic history.

== Biography ==
Večerka was born in Brno. He graduated in Czech, Russian and Slavic comparative linguistics at the Masaryk University in Brno. His teachers included prominent Paleo-Slavists such as Josef Kurz, Bohemists such as František Trávníček and Adolf Kellner, Indo-Europeanist Václav Machek and the founder of the Czech School in Comparative Literature Frank Wollman. Already during the studies he began his educational work as an assistant (1950–1952), and after graduation he remained working at the faculty (1952–1955 as a scientific intern; 1955–1964 as an assistant professor, 1964–1990 as an associate professor, 1994–present as a full professor of Slavic linguistics and literary studies, now professor emeritus).

In 1952 he received his doctorate of philosophy, from 1957 he was a candidate of philological sciences (Ph.D.), and since 1988 Doctor of Philological Sciences (DrSc.). In the period of 1967–1968 he was an associate dean at the Faculty of Philosophy in Brno, in 1990–1991 the head of Department of Czech Language at Masaryk University, in 1990–1997 member of the scientific board of the faculty. As a visiting professor he lectured at the universities of Erlangen, Munster, Regensburg, Heidelberg, Freiburg im Breisgau, Sofia, Veliko Tarnovo, Budapest, Szeged and Vienna.

He died on 18 December 2017 in Brno, at the age of 89.

== Work ==
His lifelong research focus is primarily on Paleoslavic studies (with a special emphasis on syntax and lexicography), on Old Church Slavonic in the larger context of cultural, historical and literary domain, as well as the comparative Slavic etymology and history. In addition to his extensive teaching, research, publishing, and editorial work he is a longtime member of the Scientific Council of the Slavic Institute at the Czech Academy of Sciencies, Czechoslovak and later Czech Committee of Slavicists and the Commission for the Old Slavic Church Slavonic Lexicology and Lexicography at the International Committee of Slavicists. He was co-organizer of international symposia on issues of Slavic syntax at the Faculty of Philosophy in the years 1961–1976, and has contributed on most of the Slavic international congresses held after the World War II.

He is the author and co-author of several books and more than 300 papers, articles, studies, reports, reviews, obituaries, textbooks, biographical-bibliographical portraits and jubilee materials, published in Czech and foreign periodicals. Since 1982 he is a contributor to the project Slovník jazyka staroslověnského = Lexicon linguae paleoslovenicae ("Dictionary of the Old Church Slavonic"), and since 1990 also to the Etymologický slovník jazyka staroslověnského ("Etymological Dictionary Old Church Slavonic")

== Awards ==
- 1995 The research prize (Forschungspreisträger) Alexander von Humboldt Foundation in Bonn
- 1999 Honorary Doctorate of the University of Freiburg
- 2001 Honorary Doctorate of the University of Sofia
- 2003 City of Brno Award in the field of social sciences
- 2004 Gold Medal of Masaryk University

== Works ==
- Postavení ruštiny mezi slovanskými jazyky (1957)
- Syntax aktivních participií v staroslověnštině (1961)
- Slovanské počátky české knižní vzdělanosti (1963)
- Základy slovanské filologie a staroslověnštiny (1966, 1968, 1977, 1980, 1991, 1993, 1996, 1997, 1998, 2001, 2002)
- Magnae Moraviae fontes historici I–IV (ed. s D. Bartoňkovou a kol.; edice církevněslovanských pramenů s jejich překladem do češtiny, s filologickým komentářem a bibliografií : 1966, 1967, 1969, 1971; 2. rev. a rozš. vyd. I–2008, II–2010, III– 2011)
- Čítanka staroslověnských textů se slovníčkem (s J. Kurzem a L. Řeháčkem, 1967, 1970, 1977, 1980)
- Československé práce o jazyce, dějinách a kultuře slovanských národů od roku 1760 : biograficko-bibliografický slovník (s M. Kudělkou, Z. Šimečkem a kol.; autor medailonů 104 slavistů, 1972)
- Slavica na Universitě J. E. Purkyně v Brně / Filologie, literární věda, historiografie, uměnovědy (s F. Hejlem, M. Kopeckým, A. Lamprechtem, J. Veselým, A. Závodským a I. Dorovským; autor kapitol Slovanská filologie na filosofické fakultě, Paleoslovenistika na filosofické fakultě a 41 medailonů slavistů, 1973)
- Úvod do etymologie pro bohemisty i ostatní lingvisty (s A. Erhartem 1975; 2. vydání pod názvem Úvod do etymologie, 1981)
- Československá slavistika v letech 1918–1939 (s M. Kudělkou, Z. Šimečkem a V. Šťastným, 1977)
- Spisovný jazyk v dějinách české společnosti (1979, 1982)
- Základy slavistiky a rusistiky (s D. Šlosarem 1979, 1980, 1987)
- Čítanka ze slovanské jazykovědy v českých zemích (s D. Šlosarem a J. Nechutovou, 1982)
- Staroslověnština (1984)
- Staroslověnské texty (1987, 1988, 1990, 1993, 1996)
- Altkirchenslavische (altbulgarische) Syntax. Sv. 1–5 (za spolupráce F. Kellera a E. Weihera, 1989–2003, německy)
- Počátky písemnictví v českých zemích do poloviny 13. století. Literatura staroslověnská a latinská (1992)
- Staroslavjanskij slovar‘ po rukopisjam X–XI vekov (spoluredaktor celého díla s E. Bláhovou a R. M. Cejtlinovou; autor 7 kapitol; 2. vydání 1999, rusky)
- Slavica na Masarykově univerzitě v Brně / Literární věda, jazykověda, historiografie, uměnovědy (s I. Dorovským, V. Válkem a M. Čejkou; autor kapitoly Paleoslovenistika na filosofické fakultě a 44 medailonů slavistů, 1993)
- Die Anfänge der slavischen Sprachwissenschaft in den böhmischen Ländern (1996, německy)
- Česká slavistika v prvním období svého vývoje do počátku 60. let 19. století (s M. Kudělkou a Z. Šimečkem, 1995)
- Česká slavistika od počátku 60. let 19. století do roku 1918 (s M. Kudělkou a Z. Šimečkem, 1997)
- Staroslověnská čítanka (se Z. Hauptovou, 1997; 2. dopl. vyd. 2002; dotisk 2. vyd. 2004)
- Počátky slovanského písemného jazyka : studie z dějin staroslověnského písemnictví a jazyka do konce 11. století (1999)
- Encyklopedický slovník češtiny (ed. P. Karlík, M. Nekula, J. Pleskalová; autor 36 encyklopedických statí, 2002)
- K pramenům slov. Uvedení do etymologie (s A. Erhardem, E. Havlovou, I. Janýškovou a H. Karlíkovou, 2006)
- Staroslověnština v kontextu slovanských jazyků (2006)
- Vývoj slovanské jazykovědy v českých zemích (2006)
- Kapitoly z dějin české jazykovědné bohemistiky (ed. s J. Pleskalovou, M. Krčmovou a P. Karlíkem, 2007)
- Jazyky v komparaci 1. : nástin české jazykovědné slavistiky v mezinárodním kontextu (2008)
- Jazyky v komparaci 2 : charakteristiky současných slovanských jazyků v historickém kontextu (2009)
- Staroslověnská etapa českého písemnictví (2010)
- Opera Slavica et Palaeoslovenica Minora (2011)
