= Úhlejov =

- Municipality
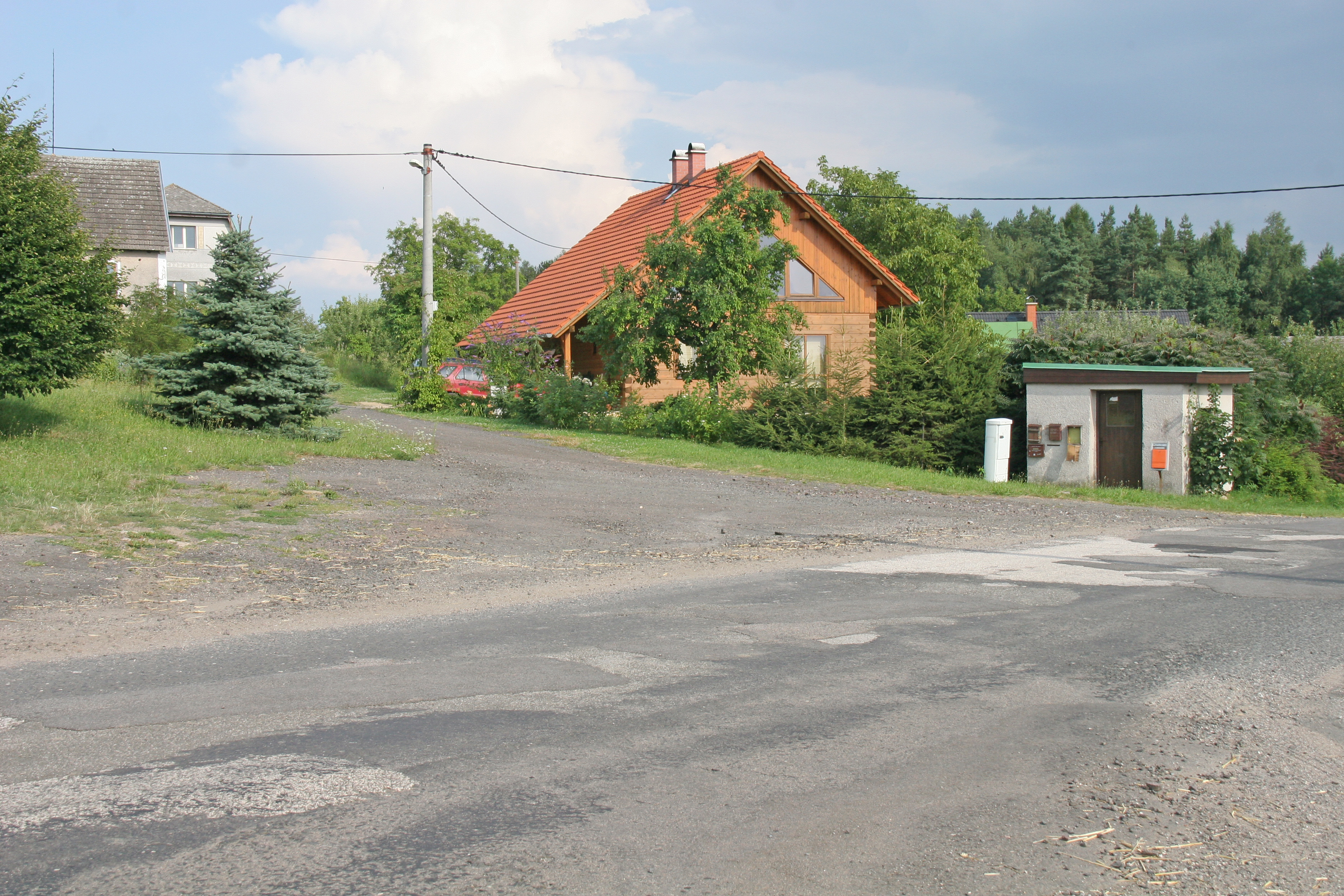
- Chroustov, a part of Úhlejov

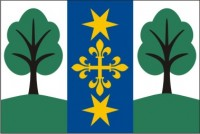
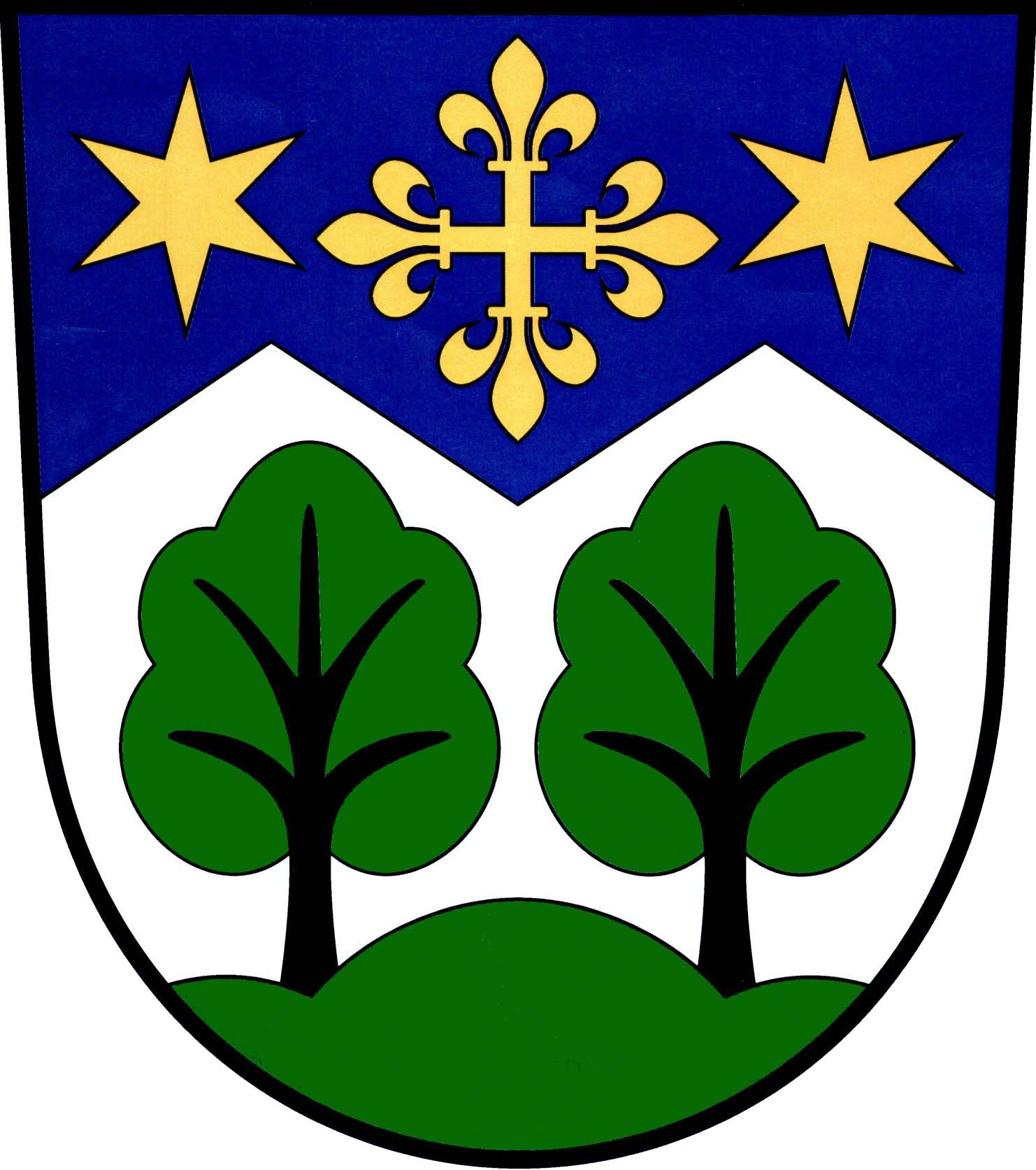
- Flag Coat of arms

- Location in the Czech Republic
- Coordinates: 50°25′38″N 15°41′15″E
- Country: Czech Republic
- Region: Hradec Králové
- District: Jičín
- First mentioned: 1267

Area
  - Total: 4.12 km^{2} (1.59 sq mi)
- Elevation: 438 m (1,437 ft)

Population (2026-01-01)
  - Total: 138
  - Density: 33.5/km^{2} (86.8/sq mi)
- Time zone: UTC+1 (CET)
  - Summer (DST): UTC+2 (CEST)
- Postal code: 507 71
- Website: www.uhlejov.cz

Úhlejov is a municipality and village in Jičín District in the Hradec Králové Region of the Czech Republic. It has about 100 inhabitants.

== Administrative division ==
Úhlejov consists of two municipal parts (in brackets population according to the 2021 census):

- Úhlejov (95)
- Chroustov (37)

== Demographics ==
Historical population
Year	Pop.	±%
1869	504	—
1880	442	−12.3%
1890	472	+6.8%
1900	431	−8.7%
1910	414	−3.9%
1921	407	−1.7%
1930	359	−11.8%
1950	268	−25.3%
1961	235	−12.3%
1970	188	−20.0%
1980	123	−34.6%
1991	104	−15.4%
2001	108	+3.8%
2011	146	+35.2%
2021	132	−9.6%
Source: Censuses

== Notable people ==
- Václav Machek (1894–1965), linguist
