= Fram Stadion =

Football stadium in Larvik, Norway

Fram Stadium
- Framparken
- Interactive map of Fram Stadium
- Address: Jernbanegata 15, 3262 Larvik; Larvik; Norway
- Coordinates: 59°02′56″N 10°03′08″E

Tenants
- IF Fram Larvik

Fram Stadion is a football stadium in Larvik, Norway. It is used by IF Fram Larvik.
