= Aleksandar Kahvić =

Bosnian footballer (born 2004)

Personal information
- Date of birth: 2 January 2004 (age 22)
- Place of birth: Doboj, Bosnia and Herzegovina
- Height: 1.93 m (6 ft 4 in)
- Position: Forward

Team information
- Current team: Košice
- Number: 30

Youth career
- Sporting AF Teslić
- Internacional Beograd
- 2020–2023: Red Star Belgrade
- 2020: → Grafičar Beograd (loan)
- 2022–2023: → Maccabi Haifa (loan)

Senior career*
Years	Team	Apps	(Gls)
2023–2024	Red Star Belgrade	0	(0)
2023	→ OFK Beograd (loan)	10	(9)
2024	→ Železničar Pančevo (loan)	19	(5)
2024	OFK Beograd	6	(5)
2024–2026	SSV Ulm	13	(0)
2025–2026	→ Domžale (loan)	11	(2)
2026–	Košice	6	(1)

International career
2020	Bosnia and Herzegovina U17	2	(2)
2021	Bosnia and Herzegovina U18	2	(2)
2021–2022	Bosnia and Herzegovina U19	14	(6)
2022–2025	Bosnia and Herzegovina U21	11	(0)
- * Club domestic league appearances and goals as of 21 September 2026

Aleksandar Kahvić (born 2 January 2004) is a Bosnian professional footballer who plays as a forward for Slovak club FC Košice.

== Club career ==
Born in Doboj, Bosnia and Herzegovina, Kahvić started his career with Bosnian side Sporting AF Teslić, before moving to Internacional Beograd, where he notably scored 24 goals in 16 games before being picked up by Serbian giants Red Star Belgrade and immediately loaned to affiliate Grafičar.

In October 2021 he was named by English newspaper The Guardian as one of the best players born in 2004 worldwide.

After being linked with moves to Russia and Slovenia, Kahvić joined Israeli side Maccabi Haifa on loan with an option to buy in September 2022.

Kahvić moved on loan to OFK Beograd in the summer of 2023, scored 9 goals in 10 games in 2023–24 Serbian First League.

On 22 January 2024, Kahvić was loaned to Železničar Pančevo on a six-month contract.

On 30 August 2024, Kahvić signed with SSV Ulm in Germany. On 9 September 2025, he moved on loan to Domžale in Slovenia for the 2025–26 season.

== International career ==
Kahvić has represented Bosnia and Herzegovina at under-19 and under-21 level.

== Style of play ==
Standing at 1.92 m, Kahvić is known for his prolific goalscoring ability, and models his style of play on Belgian striker Romelu Lukaku.
