= Jesse Nikki =

Finnish footballer (born 2003)

Personal information
- Date of birth: 28 June 2003 (age 23)
- Place of birth: Finland
- Height: 1.90 m (6 ft 3 in)
- Position: Centre-back

Team information
- Current team: JäPS
- Number: 4

Youth career
- –2020: Honka

Senior career*
Years	Team	Apps	(Gls)
2020–2021	Honka II	21	(1)
2022	HIFK	17	(0)
2023	Honka II	8	(1)
2024	Haka	1	(0)
2025–	JäPS	41	(2)

International career^{‡}
2019–2020	Finland U17	5	(0)
2021–2022	Finland U19	4	(1)
- * Club domestic league appearances and goals as of 1 November 2026 ‡ National team caps and goals as of 27 August 2024

Jesse Nikki (born 28 June 2003) is a Finnish professional footballer plays as a centre-back for Ykkösliiga club JäPS.
