= Adrian Bukowski =

Polish footballer

Personal information
- Full name: Adrian Bukowski
- Date of birth: 18 March 2003 (age 23)
- Place of birth: Koszalin, Poland
- Height: 1.88 m (6 ft 2 in)
- Position: Central midfielder

Team information
- Current team: Chrobry Głogów
- Number: 33

Youth career
- –2016: Bałtyk Koszalin
- 2016–2019: Zagłębie Lubin

Senior career*
Years	Team	Apps	(Gls)
2019–2021	Zagłębie Lubin II	4	(0)
2021–2023	Śląsk Wrocław II	59	(4)
2021–2024	Śląsk Wrocław	11	(0)
2023–2024	→ Stal Rzeszów (loan)	19	(5)
2024–2026	Stal Mielec	26	(1)
2026–	Chrobry Głogów	0	(0)

International career
2017–2018	Poland U15	1	(0)
2020	Poland U16	3	(0)
2021	Poland U19	3	(1)
2024	Poland U20	2	(0)
2023	Poland U21	1	(0)
- * Club domestic league appearances and goals as of 21:08, 26 May 2026 (UTC)

Adrian Bukowski (born 18 March 2003) is a Polish professional footballer who plays as a central midfielder for I liga club Chrobry Głogów.

== Career statistics ==
As of match played 24 May 2026

Appearances and goals by club, season and competition
Club	Season	League			Polish Cup		Europe		Other		Total	
Club	Season	Division	Apps	Goals	Apps	Goals	Apps	Goals	Apps	Goals	Apps	Goals
Zagłębie Lubin II	2020–21	III liga, gr. III	4	0	—		—		—		4	0
Śląsk Wrocław II	2020–21	II liga	17	1	—		—		—		17	1
Śląsk Wrocław II	2021–22	II liga	24	2	0	0	—		—		24	2
Śląsk Wrocław II	2022–23	II liga	15	1	0	0	—		—		15	1
Śląsk Wrocław II	2023–24	III liga, gr. III	3	0	0	0	—		—		3	0
Śląsk Wrocław II	Total		59	4	0	0	—		—		59	4
Śląsk Wrocław	2021–22	Ekstraklasa	2	0	0	0	—		—		2	0
Śląsk Wrocław	2022–23	Ekstraklasa	9	0	2	0	—		—		11	0
Śląsk Wrocław	Total		11	0	2	0	—		—		13	0
Stal Rzeszów (loan)	2023–24	I liga	19	5	3	0	—		—		22	5
Stal Mielec	2024–25	Ekstraklasa	9	0	0	0	—		—		9	0
Stal Mielec	2025–26	I liga	15	1	0	0	—		—		15	1
Stal Mielec	Total		24	1	0	0	—		—		24	1
Chrobry Głogów	2026–27	I liga	0	0	0	0	—		—		0	0
Career total			117	10	5	0	0	0	0	0	122	10

== Honours ==
Zagłębie Lubin II

- Polish Cup (Legnica regionals): 2019–20
