= Matěj Hadaš =

Czech footballer

Personal information
- Date of birth: 25 November 2003 (age 22)
- Height: 1.84 m (6 ft 0 in)
- Position: Midfielder

Team information
- Current team: Sigma Olomouc
- Number: 22

Youth career
- 2010–2011: Valašské Meziříčí
- 2011–2012: Sokol Kateřinice
- 2012–2021: Sigma Olomouc

Senior career*
Years	Team	Apps	(Gls)
2021–	Sigma Olomouc	62	(0)
2021–2024	Sigma Olomouc B	59	(5)

International career^{‡}
2019	Czech Republic U16	5	(1)
2019	Czech Republic U17	11	(0)
2021–2022	Czech Republic U19	12	(2)
2024	Czech Republic U20	2	(0)
2024–	Czech Republic U21	2	(0)
- * Club domestic league appearances and goals as of 27 May 2026 ‡ National team caps and goals as of 11 November 2024

Matěj Hadaš (born 25 November 2003) is a Czech footballer who currently plays as a midfielder for Sigma Olomouc.

== Career statistics ==
=== Club ===
As of 10 November 2021.

Club	Season	League			Cup		Continental		Other		Total	
Club	Season	Division	Apps	Goals	Apps	Goals	Apps	Goals	Apps	Goals	Apps	Goals
Sigma Olomouc	2020–21	Fortuna liga	1	0	0	0	–		0	0	1	0
Sigma Olomouc	2021–22	Fortuna liga	0	0	1 (Note: Appearances in the Czech Cup)	0	–		0	0	1	0
Total		1	0	1	0	0	0	0	0	2	0	
Sigma Olomouc B	2021–22	ČFL	8	1	–		–		0	0	8	1
Career total			9	1	1	0	0	0	0	0	10	1

== Honours ==
Sigma Olomouc

- Czech Cup: 2024–25
