= Mykhaylo Khromey =

Ukrainian footballer (born 2003)

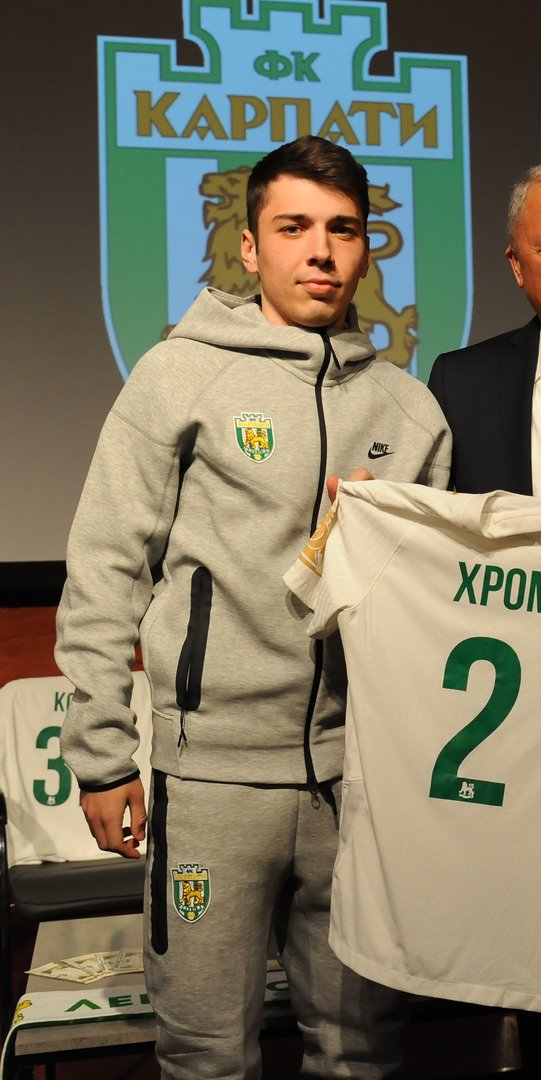

Personal information
- Full name: Mykhaylo Ivanovych Khromey
- Date of birth: 19 November 2003 (age 22)
- Place of birth: Ivano-Frankivsk, Ukraine
- Height: 1.72 m (5 ft 8 in)
- Position: Central midfielder

Team information
- Current team: Probiy
- Number: 17

Youth career
- 2015–2017: Metalist Kharkiv
- 2017: Nika Ivano-Frankivsk
- 2017–2018: Bukovyna Chernivtsi
- 2018–2021: Shakhtar Donetsk

Senior career*
Years	Team	Apps	(Gls)
2021–2026	Shakhtar Donetsk	0	(0)
2021–2022	→ Mariupol (loan)	11	(1)
2024	→ Karpaty Lviv (loan)	1	(0)
2024	→ Karpaty Lviv-2 (loan)	1	(0)
2024–2025	→ Chornomorets Odesa (loan)	0	(0)
2026–	Probiy	11	(1)

International career^{‡}
2019–2020	Ukraine U17	7	(0)
2021	Ukraine U19	2	(1)
- * Club domestic league appearances and goals as of 4 June 2026 ‡ National team caps and goals as of 20 June 2025

Mykhaylo Ivanovych Khromey (Ukrainian: Михайло Іванович Хромей; born 19 November 2003) is a Ukrainian professional footballer who plays as a central midfielder for Ukrainian First League club Probiy.

== Career ==
Khromey is a product of Shakhtar Donetsk academy system. He made his professional debut for Mariupol in the Ukrainian Premier League as a substitute player in the away match against Lviv on 23 July 2021.

In August 2024, he went on loan to Ukrainian Premier League side FC Chornomorets Odesa, making his debut against FC Karpaty Lviv on 21 August. At the beginning of January 2025, Khromey left Chornomorets Odeas.
