= David Jonathans =

Luxembourgish footballer (born 2004)

Personal information
- Date of birth: 26 January 2004 (age 22)
- Place of birth: Apeldoorn, Netherlands
- Height: 1.83 m (6 ft 0 in)
- Positions: Winger; forward

Team information
- Current team: FC Augsburg II
- Number: 24

Youth career
- 2016–2020: Swift Hesperange
- 2020–2023: Bayern Munich

Senior career*
Years	Team	Apps	(Gls)
2023–2025	Bayern Munich II	27	(2)
2024–2025	→ FC Den Bosch (loan)	1	(0)
2026	Jeunesse Esch	12	(3)
2026–	FC Augsburg II	7	(1)

International career^{‡}
2018	Luxembourg U15	2	(5)
2020	Luxembourg U16	1	(0)
2019	Luxembourg U17	3	(0)
2021	Luxembourg U19	3	(1)
2023–2025	Luxembourg U21	5	(0)
2023–	Luxembourg	3	(0)
- * Club domestic league appearances and goals as of 24 September 2026 ‡ National team caps and goals as of 22:45, 14 October 2025 (UTC)

David Jonathans (born 26 January 2004) is a professional footballer who plays as a winger or forward for Regionalliga Bayern club FC Augsburg II. Born in the Netherlands, he plays for the Luxembourg national team.

== Club career ==
=== Bayern Munich ===
Jonathans signed for German club Bayern Munich in July 2020, moving from Swift Hesperange of Luxembourg. He signed a contract extension in April 2022, keeping him with the Bavarian club until 2025. He received his first call-up for Bayern Munich II in a 2–0 away loss Regionalliga Bayern match against TSV Aubstadt on 3 October 2022, however he did not feature in the match.

He made his debut with Bayern Munich II on a Regionalliga Bayern match against 1. FC Nürnberg II on 17 May 2023, coming off the bench as a substitute.

Jonathans scored his first competitive goal starting for Bayern Munich II in a 4–2 home victory Regionalliga Bayern match against SpVgg Ansbach on 3 October 2023.

On 31 August 2025, he departed from Bayern Munich after 5 years with the club, becoming a free agent ahead of the 2025–26 season.

==== Loan to FC Den Bosch ====
On 19 August 2024, he joined Dutch Eerste Divisie club FC Den Bosch on a season-long loan.

=== Jeunesse Esch ===
In January 2026, Jonathans returned to Luxembourg and signed with BGL Ligue club Jeunesse Esch, as a free agent.

=== FC Augsburg ===
On 7 August 2026, he returned to Germany and signed with FC Augsburg's reserve team, ahead of the 2026–27 season.

== International career ==
Jonathans was born in the Netherlands and is of both Dutch and Indonesian descent, he is eligible to represent Luxembourg, Indonesia and the Netherlands.

He has represented Luxembourg from under-15 to under-21 level, and made his senior debut with the Luxembourg national team coming off the bench as a late substitute in a 0–1 friendly loss against Malta on 9 June 2023.

== Career statistics ==
=== Club ===
As of match played 14 August 2026

Appearances and goals by club, season and competition
Club	Season	League			Cup		Other		Total	
Club	Season	Division	Apps	Goals	Apps	Goals	Apps	Goals	Apps	Goals
Bayern Munich II	2022–23	Regionalliga Bayern	1	0	—		—		1	0
Bayern Munich II	2023–24	Regionalliga Bayern	26	2	—		—		26	2
Bayern Munich II	Total		27	2	—		—		27	2
Den Bosch (loan)	2024–25	Eerste Divisie	1	0	0	0	1 (Note: Appearance in Eerste Divisie play-offs)	0	2	0
Den Bosch (loan)	Total		1	0	0	0	1	0	2	0
Jeunesse Esch	2025–26	BGL Ligue	11	3	—		0	0	11	3
Jeunesse Esch	2026–27	BGL Ligue	1	0	—		0	0	1	0
Jeunesse Esch	Total		12	3	0	0	0	0	12	3
FC Augsburg II	2026–27	Regionalliga Bayern	1	0	—		0	0	1	0
FC Augsburg II	Total		1	0	—		0	0	1	0
Career Total			41	5	0	0	1	0	42	5

=== International ===
As of match played 9 June 2024

Luxembourg
Year	Apps	Goals
2023	1	0
2024	2	0
Total	3	0
