= Danylo Udod =

Ukrainian footballer

Personal information
- Full name: Danylo Olehovych Udod
- Date of birth: 9 March 2004 (age 22)
- Place of birth: Donetsk, Ukraine
- Height: 1.81 m (5 ft 11 in)
- Position: Defender

Team information
- Current team: Chornomorets Odesa (on loan from Shakhtar Donetsk)
- Number: 86

Youth career
- 2017–2021: Shakhtar Donetsk

Senior career*
Years	Team	Apps	(Gls)
2021–	Shakhtar Donetsk	0	(0)
2021	→ Mariupol (loan)	6	(0)
2022–2023	→ Al Ain (loan)	0	(0)
2024–	→ Chornomorets Odesa (loan)	12	(0)

International career^{‡}
2019	Ukraine U16	2	(0)
2021–2023	Ukraine U19	7	(1)
- * Club domestic league appearances and goals as of 14 June 2025 ‡ National team caps and goals as of 7 October 2023

Danylo Olehovych Udod (Ukrainian: Данило Олегович Удод; born 9 March 2004) is a Ukrainian professional footballer who plays as a defender for Ukrainian Premier League side Chornomorets Odesa, on loan from Shakhtar Donetsk.

== Career ==
Born in Donetsk, Udod began his career in the local FC Shakhtar youth sportive school.

He played in the Ukrainian Premier League Reserves and never made his debut for the Shakhtar Donetsk senior squad. In July 2021 he went on loan to Ukrainian Premier League side FC Mariupol, making his debut as a substitute against Zorya Luhansk on 22 August 2021. In July 2024 he went on loan to Ukrainian Premier League side FC Chornomorets Odesa, making his debut against Kryvbas Kryvyi Rih on 3 August 2024.
