= Albert Hofman (footballer) =

Romanian footballer

Personal information
- Date of birth: 10 April 2003 (age 23)
- Place of birth: Câmpulung Moldovenesc, Romania
- Height: 1.82 m (6 ft 0 in)
- Position: Forward

Youth career
- –2018: Juniorul Suceava
- 2018–2021: Universitatea Cluj

Senior career*
Years	Team	Apps	(Gls)
2021–2025	Universitatea Cluj	36	(7)
2024	→ Unirea Dej (loan)	10	(3)
2024–2025	→ Oțelul Galați (loan)	12	(0)
2025–2026	Chindia Târgoviște	12	(2)
2026	→ CSM Olimpia Satu Mare (loan)	9	(0)
Total		79	(12)

International career
2021–2022	Romania U19	10	(2)
- * Club domestic league appearances and goals as of 2 May 2026

Albert Hofman (born 10 April 2003) is a Romanian former professional footballer who played as a forward.

== Club career ==
He made his Liga I debut for Universitatea Cluj on 5 August 2022, in a 0–1 loss to Petrolul Ploiești.

== Personal life ==
His father, Marius, was also a footballer who played in the Romanian second league.

== Honours ==
Universitatea Cluj

- Cupa României runner-up: 2022–23
