= Polat Yaldır =

Turkish footballer

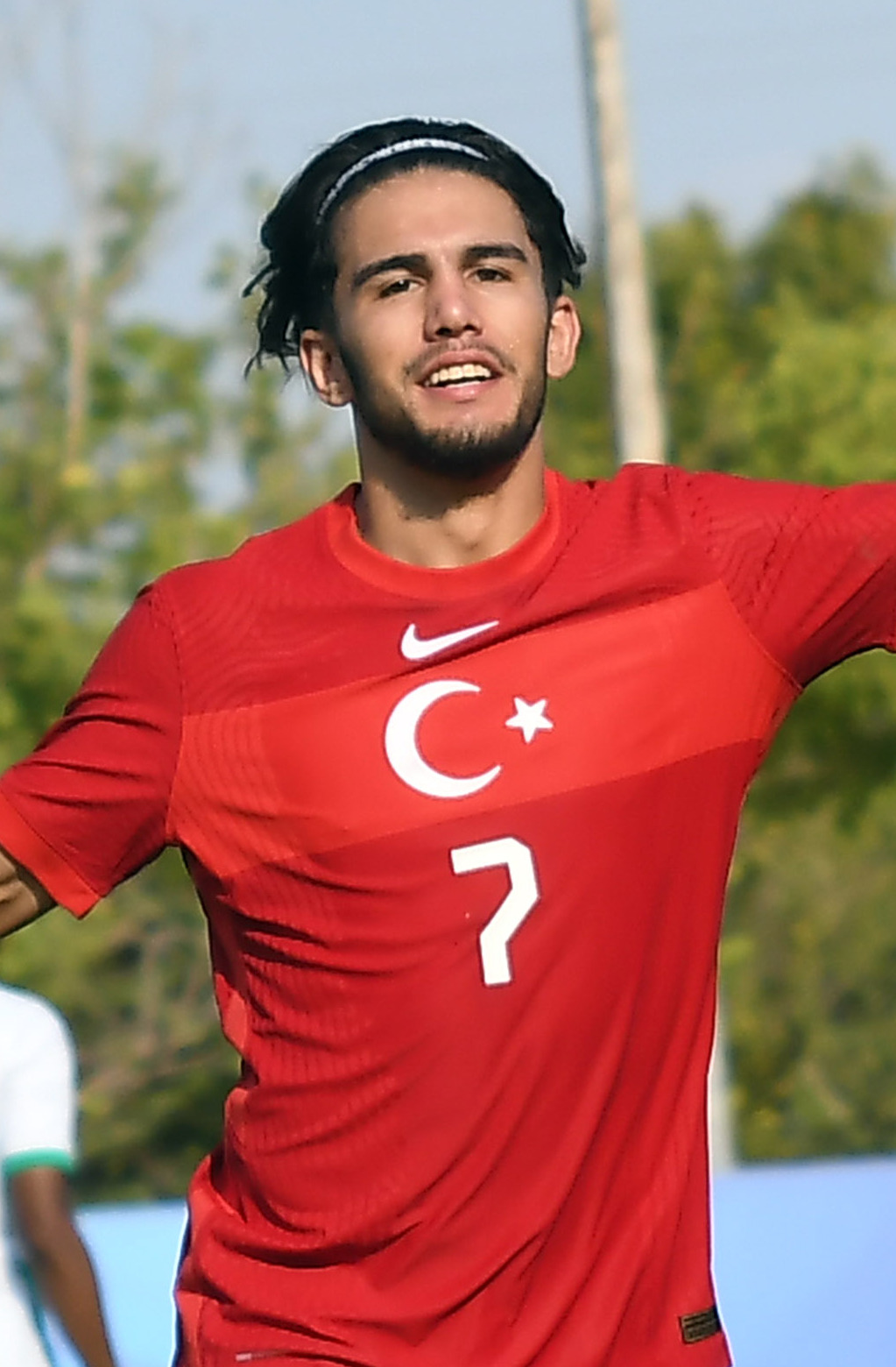
- Yaldır in 2022

Personal information
- Date of birth: 17 May 2003 (age 23)
- Place of birth: Aksaray, Turkey
- Height: 1.84 m (6 ft 0 in)
- Position: Winger

Team information
- Current team: Batman Petrolspor
- Number: 72

Youth career
- 2013–2018: Kızılcahamam Belediyespor
- 2018–2019: Yaşamkent SK
- 2019–2021: Samsunspor

Senior career*
Years	Team	Apps	(Gls)
2021–2026	Samsunspor	28	(2)
2023–2024	→ Arnavutköy Belediyespor (loan)	26	(0)
2024–2025	→ Karaman (loan)	32	(9)
2026–	Batman Petrolspor	9	(3)

International career^{‡}
2021–2022	Turkey U19	9	(2)
2012	Turkey U23	5	(0)
- * Club domestic league appearances and goals as of 18 October 2026 ‡ National team caps and goals as of 23:01, 25 March 2025 (UTC)

Polat Yaldır (born 17 May 2003) is a Turkish professional footballer who plays as a winger for TFF 1. Lig club Batman Petrolspor.

== Career ==
Yaldır is a product of the youth academies of the Turkish clubs Kızılcahamam Belediyespor, Yaşamkent SK and Samsunspor. In 2021 he was promoted to their senior team, and debuted with the team in the TFF First League. He was part of the squad that won the 2022–23 TFF 1. Lig. He went on loan to Arnavutköy Belediyespor for the 2023–24 season in the TFF Second League. He spent the 2024–25 season on loan with Karaman again in the TFF 2 League, returning to Samsunspor in the Süper Lig for the 2025–26 season.

== International career ==
Yaldır was called up to the Turkey U19s for a set of friendlies in July 2021. He was part of the Turkey U23s that won the 2021 Islamic Solidarity Games.

== Honours ==
Samsunspor

- TFF 1. Lig: 2022–23

Turkey U23

- Islamic Solidarity Games: 2021
