= Dmitry Latykhov =

Belarusian footballer

Personal information
- Full name: Dmitry Denisovich Latykhov
- Date of birth: 25 March 2003 (age 23)
- Place of birth: Minsk, Belarus
- Height: 1.88 m (6 ft 2 in)
- Position: Forward

Team information
- Current team: Bumprom Gomel
- Number: 77

Youth career
- 2017–2021: Dinamo Minsk

Senior career*
Years	Team	Apps	(Gls)
2021–2022	Dinamo Minsk	23	(2)
2023–2024	Isloch Minsk Raion	26	(1)
2024–2025	Ural-2 Yekaterinburg	24	(8)
2026	Naftan Novopolotsk	11	(1)
2026–	Bumprom Gomel	5	(1)

International career^{‡}
2019	Belarus U17	3	(0)
2021	Belarus U19	3	(2)
2021–2023	Belarus U21	6	(3)
- * Club domestic league appearances and goals as of 22 August 2026 ‡ National team caps and goals as of 28 March 2023

Dmitry Denisovich Latykhov (Belarusian: Дзмітрый Дзянісавіч Латыхаў; Russian: Дмитрий Денисович Латыхов; born 25 March 2003) is a Belarusian professional footballer who plays for Bumprom Gomel.
