= Martin Talakov =

Macedonian footballer

Personal information
- Full name: Martin Talakov; Мартин Талаков
- Date of birth: 9 March 2003 (age 23)
- Place of birth: Veles, Macedonia
- Height: 1.72 m (5 ft 8 in)
- Positions: Attacking midfielder; central midfielder

Team information
- Current team: Rabotnicki
- Number: 10

Youth career
- –2020: Akademija Pandev
- 2021: Železiarne Podbrezová
- 2022: Žilina

Senior career*
Years	Team	Apps	(Gls)
2020–2021	Akademija Pandev	7	(0)
2021	→ FK Borec (loan)	11	(0)
2021–2025	Železiarne Podbrezová	49	(0)
2022	→ Žilina B (loan)	6	(0)
2025	Pohronie	10	(1)
2025	Makedonija GP	10	(2)
2026–	Rabotnicki	17	(4)

International career^{‡}
2019	North Macedonia U17	3	(0)
2021	North Macedonia U19	3	(1)
2023	North Macedonia U21	5	(0)
- * Club domestic league appearances and goals as of 15 June 2026 ‡ National team caps and goals as of 2 October 2023

Martin Talakov (Macedonian: Мартин Талаков; born 9 March 2003) is a Macedonian professional footballer who plays for Rabotnicki as an attacking midfielder.

== Club career ==
=== FK Železiarne Podbrezová ===
Talakov made his professional Fortuna Liga debut for Železiarne Podbrezová against MFK Tatran Liptovský Mikuláš on 27 August 2022.
