= Václav Machek (linguist) =

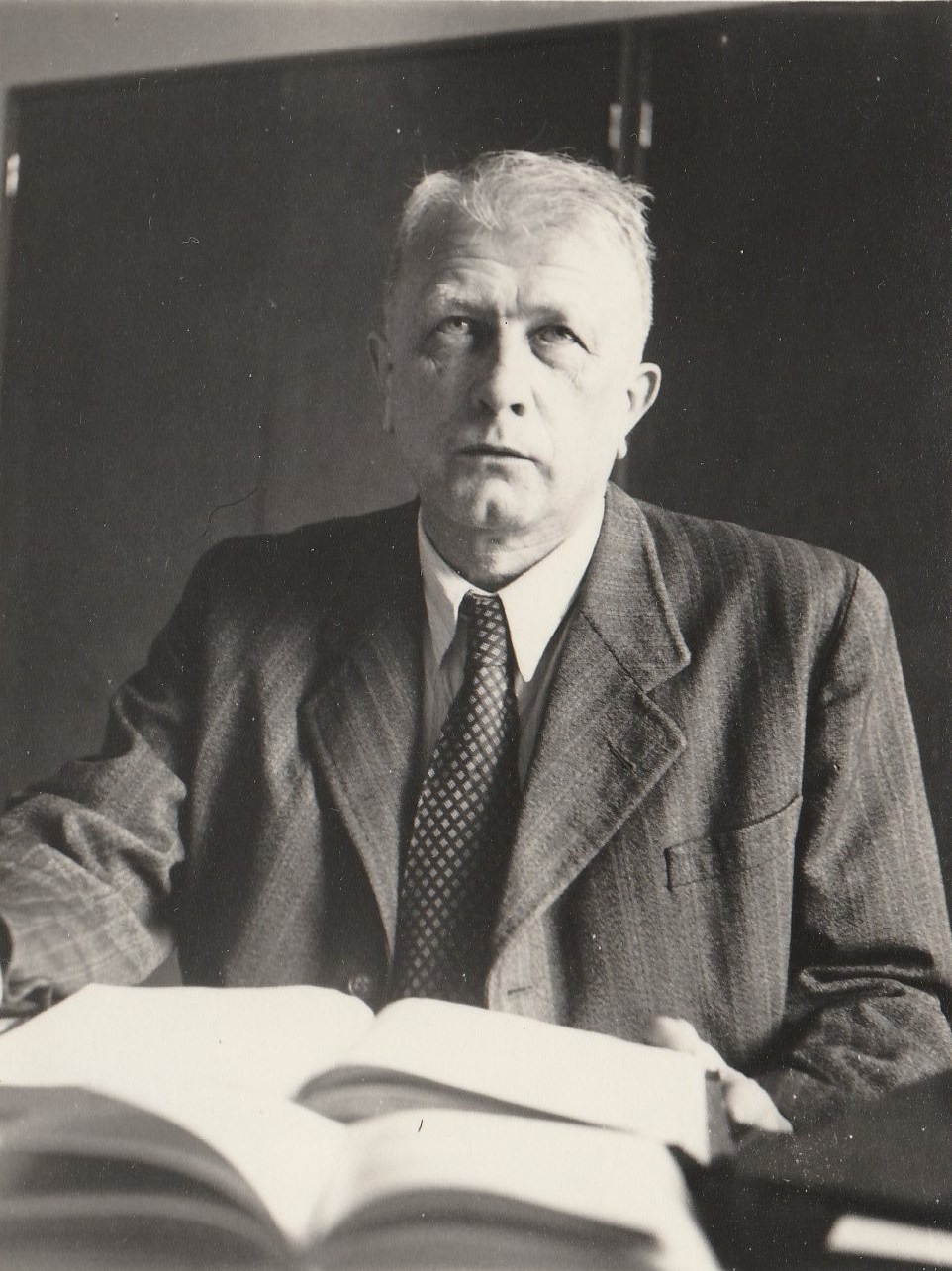
- Born: 8 November 1894; Úhlejov
- Died: 26 May 1965 (aged 70); Brno
- Occupations: Scholar of Slavic languages (Slavistics), philologist, etymologist

Václav Machek (8 November 1894, Úhlejov – 26 May 1965, Brno) was a Czech linguist.

== Life ==
In years 1914–1921 (studies were interrupted by World War I) Machek studied Czech and Latin language at Charles University in Prague (his main interest during studies were Baltic languages and etymology). In years 1921-1924 he studied linguistics in Paris. Several years he taught at high schools in Czechoslovakia. From 1936 he was a professor of Slavic studies and comparative linguistics at then Jan Evangelista Purkyně University (now Masaryk University).

== Work ==
His scientific work is dedicated to etymology, especially in the Czech and Slovak languages; his etymological studies are always joined with studies of cultural backgrounds. His most important work is still reprinted, the Etymological Dictionary of Czech and Slovak language (Etymologický slovník jazyka českého a slovenského, 1957, 1968, in later edition, articles about Slovak words were omitted), Czech and Slovak names of plants (Česká a slovenská jména rostlin, 1954); he also collaborated on a project of an unfinished Etymological dictionary of Slavic languages (Etymologický slovník slovanských jazyků, 1973-1980).

Machek's non-monographic works were collected in Sebrané spisy Václava Machka (Prague, 2011). Some of his minor works were written in French.

One of his unpublished work Česká jména hub has been recently found in the archive.
