= Dalibor Večerka =

Czech footballer (born 2003)

Personal information
- Date of birth: 12 March 2003 (age 23)
- Place of birth: Czech Republic
- Height: 1.85 m (6 ft 1 in)
- Position: Defender

Team information
- Current team: Teplice
- Number: 28

Youth career
- 2009–2011: U Plus U Žimrovice
- 2011–2014: Hradec nad Moravicí
- 2014–2020: Opava

Senior career*
Years	Team	Apps	(Gls)
2020–2022	Opava	28	(0)
2021–2022	→ Sparta Prague B (loan)	12	(1)
2022–2025	Sparta Prague	0	(0)
2022–2025	→→ Sparta Prague B	55	(0)
2025–	Teplice	45	(1)

International career^{‡}
2021–	Czech Republic U19	7	(2)
- * Club domestic league appearances and goals as of 27 May 2026 ‡ National team caps and goals as of 18:44, 10 November 2021 (UTC)

Dalibor Večerka (born 12 March 2003) is a Czech footballer who currently plays as a defender for Teplice.

== Career statistics ==
=== Club ===
As of 10 November 2021.

Club	Season	League			Cup		Continental		Other		Total	
Club	Season	Division	Apps	Goals	Apps	Goals	Apps	Goals	Apps	Goals	Apps	Goals
Opava	2020–21	Fortuna liga	23	0	0	0	–		0	0	23	0
Opava	2021–22	FNL	5	0	0	0	–		0	0	5	0
Opava	Total		28	0	0	0	0	0	0	0	28	0
Sparta Prague B (loan)	2021–22	FNL	3	0	–		–		0	0	3	0
Career total			31	0	0	0	0	0	0	0	31	0
