= 2021–22 FK Vojvodina season =

FK Vojvodina
2021–22 season
- President: Dragoljub Samardžić
- Head coach: Slavoljub Đorđević (until 14 March); Dragan Radojičić (from 15 March)
- Stadium: Karađorđe Stadium
- Serbian SuperLiga: 7th
- Serbian Cup: Semi-finals
- Conference League: Third qualifying round
- Top goalscorer: League: Veljko Simić (10); All: Veljko Simić (12)
- Highest home attendance: 7,615 vs Partizan (25 July 2021)
- Lowest home attendance: 550 vs Mladost (29 November 2021)
- Average home league attendance: 1,751
Home colours	Away colours
- All statistics correct as of 22 May 2022.

The 2021–22 season was Vojvodina's 107th season in existence and the club's 16th competing in the Serbian SuperLiga.

== Transfers ==
=== In ===
Date	Position	Name	From	Type	Ref.
30 May 2021	DF	(Serbia) Igor Jeličić	(Serbia) Kabel	End of Loan	
30 May 2021	DF	(Serbia) Lazar Stojsavljević	(Serbia) Rad	End of Loan	
30 May 2021	MF	(Serbia) Bogdan Mladenović	(Iraq) Al-Diwaniya	End of Loan	
30 May 2021	MF	(Serbia) Mihajlo Nešković	(Serbia) Inđija	End of Loan	
30 May 2021	MF	(Montenegro) Petar Pavlićević	(Serbia) Kabel	End of Loan	
30 May 2021	FW	(Serbia) Vukašin Bogdanović	(Serbia) Kabel	End of Loan	
30 May 2021	MF	(Serbia) Đorđe Pantelić	(Serbia) Inđija	End of Loan	
30 May 2021	FW	(Serbia) Milan Vidakov	(Serbia) Kabel	End of Loan	
30 May 2021	DF	(Serbia) Marko Mandić	(Serbia) Kabel	End of Loan	
9 June 2021	MF	(Serbia) Aleksandar Busnić	(Serbia) Rad	Transfer	
17 June 2021	DF	(Serbia) Dušan Stevanović	(Serbia) Radnik Surdulica	Transfer	
23 June 2021	DF	(Serbia) Luka Cucin	(Serbia) Partizan	Free Transfer	
30 June 2021	FW	(Serbia) Nebojša Bastajić	(Serbia) Inđija	Free Transfer	
26 August 2021	DF	(Montenegro) Boris Kopitović	(Belarus) BATE Borisov	Free Transfer	
Winter transfers
12 January 2022	FW	(Montenegro) Ivan Vukčević	(Montenegro) Zeta	Transfer	
15 January 2022	DF	(Serbia) Milan Lazarević	(Latvia) Liepāja	Free Transfer	
19 January 2022	FW	(Serbia) Bojan Matić	(Uzbekistan) Pakhtakor	Free Transfer	
20 January 2022	GK	(Serbia) Emil Rockov	(Hungary) Fehérvár	Loan	

=== Out ===
Date	Position	Name	To	Type	Ref.
30 May 2021	GK	(Serbia) Željko Brkić		Retired	
2 June 2021	DF	(Croatia) Slavko Bralić	(Croatia) Osijek	Free Transfer	
3 June 2021	DF	(Bosnia and Herzegovina) Siniša Saničanin	(Serbia) Partizan	Free Transfer	
30 June 2021	MF	(Serbia) Petar Bojić	(Romania) Sepsi OSK	Free Transfer	
30 June 2021	MF	(Serbia) Bogdan Mladenović	(Serbia) Kolubara	Free Transfer	
1 July 2021	DF	(Serbia) Nikola Andrić	Free Agent	End of Contract	
1 July 2021	DF	(Serbia) Đorđe Đurić	Free Agent	End of Contract	
1 July 2021	MF	(Montenegro) Nikola Drinčić		Retired	
1 July 2021	FW	(Serbia) Miodrag Gemović	(Saudi Arabia) Al-Khaleej	Free Transfer	
1 July 2021	MF	(Montenegro) Petar Pavlićević	(Montenegro) Iskra	Loan	
1 July 2021	FW	(Serbia) Milan Vidakov	(Serbia) Mladost GAT	Loan	
1 July 2021	FW	(Russia) Matvey Martinkevich	(Serbia) Kabel	Loan	
1 July 2021	FW	(Serbia) Vukašin Bogdanović	(Serbia) Bačka	Loan	
1 July 2021	DF	(Serbia) Marko Mandić	(Serbia) Bačka	Free Transfer	
15 July 2021	MF	(Serbia) Đorđe Pantelić	(Bosnia and Herzegovina) Radnik Bijeljina	Free Transfer	
1 August 2021	DF	(Serbia) Aranđel Stojković	(Serbia) TSC	Free Transfer	
4 September 2021	DF	(Serbia) Lazar Stojsavljević	(Slovakia) AS Trenčin	Free Transfer	
Winter transfers
29 December 2021	DF	(Serbia) Luka Cucin	Free Agent	Broken contract	
17 January 2022	GK	(Serbia) Nemanja Toroman	(Serbia) Bačka	Loan	
5 April 2022	FW	(Serbia) Nemanja Čović	(China) Kunshan	Transfer	

== Friendlies ==
=== Summer training camp ===
23 June 2021	Śląsk Wrocław (Poland)	0–1	Vojvodina	Odranci, Slovenia
18:00		Report	Kabić 82'	Stadium: NK Odranci; Attendance: 30

26 June 2021	Maribor (Slovenia)	4–1	Vojvodina	Maribor, Slovenia
19:00	Požeg 13', 36'; Kovačević 49' (o.g.); Martinović 77'	Report	Kabić 82'	Stadium: Ljudski vrt Attendance: 0

30 June 2021	Mura (Slovenia)	1–1	Vojvodina	Gornja Radgona, Slovenia
18:00	Kous 32'	Report	Mrkaić 74'	Stadium: Gornja Radgona Stadium; Attendance: 30

3 July 2021	Gorica (Croatia)	0–2	Vojvodina	Radomlje, Slovenia
17:00		Report	Simić 57'; Bastajić 77'	Stadium: Radomlje Sports Park; Attendance: 50

10 July 2021	Vojvodina	0–0	(Israel) Maccabi Netanya	Novi Sad, Serbia
20:30		Report		Stadium: Karađorđe Stadium; Attendance: 587

=== Winter training camp ===
23 January 2022	Nizhny Novgorod (Russia)	2–0	Vojvodina	Belek, Turkey
15:30	Suleymanov 56'; Ennin 59'	Report		Stadium: Susesi Luxury Resort; Attendance: 30

26 January 2022	Śląsk Wrocław (Poland)	0–2	Vojvodina	Belek, Turkey
17:00		Report	Busnić 19'; Stevanović 69'	Stadium: Susesi Luxury Resort; Attendance: 50

30 January 2022	Metalist Kharkiv (Ukraine)	2–3	Vojvodina	Belek, Turkey
15:00	Potimkov 51'; Kravchenko 62' (pen.)	Report	Čović 36'; Zukić 48'; Matić 71' (pen.)	Stadium: Papillon Sports Center; Attendance: 40

3 February 2022	Slavia Sofia (Bulgaria)	Canceled	Vojvodina	Belek, Turkey
15:30		Report

== Competitions ==
=== Overview ===
Competition	Record							
Competition	P	W	D	L	GF	GA	GD	Win %
Serbian SuperLiga	37	13	6	18	44	51	−7	35.14
Serbian Cup	4	2	1	1	11	4	+7	50.00
UEFA Europa Conference League	4	2	0	2	3	7	−4	50.00
Total	45	17	7	21	58	62	−4	37.78

=== Serbian SuperLiga ===
==== Regular season ====
===== League table =====
Pos	Team	Pld	W	D	L	GF	GA	GD	Pts	Qualification
5	Radnički Niš	30	9	13	8	32	33	−1	40	Qualification for the Championship round
6	Voždovac	30	11	7	12	41	37	+4	40	Qualification for the Championship round
7	Vojvodina	30	11	6	13	38	40	−2	39	Qualification for the Championship round
8	Napredak Kruševac	30	10	7	13	31	36	−5	37	Qualification for the Championship round
9	Mladost Lučani	30	10	6	14	38	44	−6	36	Qualification for the Relegation round

Source: SuperLiga (in Serbian)
Rules for classification: 1) Points; 2) Head-to-head points; 3) Head-to-head goal difference; 4) Head-to-head goals scored; 5) Head-to-head away goals scored (if two teams tied); 6) Goal difference; 7) Goals scored; 8) Fair play ranking; 9) Draw.

===== Results by matchday =====
Round	1	2	3	4	5	6	7	8	9	10	11	12	13	14	15	16	17	18	19	20	21	22	23	24	25	26	27	28	29	30
Ground	A	H	A	H	A	H	A	H	A	H	A	H	A	H	A	H	A	H	A	H	A	H	A	H	A	H	A	H	A	H
Result	D	L	W	W	D	W	L	D	W	W	L	D	D	W	W	L	L	W	L	L	D	W	W	L	L	L	L	L	L	W
Position	11	13	8	4	6	6	8	7	6	5	6	5	5	4	4	4	4	4	4	4	4	4	4	4	4	5	5	7	7	7

Updated to match(es) played on 11 April 2022. Source: https://www.superliga.rs/sezone/2021-22/team/5-super-liga-srbije-2021-22/15-vojvodina
A = Away; H = Home; W = Win; D = Draw; L = Loss

=== Results ===
16 July 2021 1	Red Star Belgrade	0–0	Vojvodina	Belgrade
20:00		Report		Stadium: Rajko Mitić Stadium; Attendance: 20,300; Referee: (Serbia) Lazar Lukić

25 July 2021 2	Vojvodina	0–2	Partizan	Novi Sad
21:00		Report	Natkho 4', 58'	Stadium: Karađorđe Stadium; Attendance: 7,615; Referee: (Serbia) Novak Simović

25 November 2021 3	Mladost	0–2	Vojvodina	Lučani
14:30		Report	Čović 25' (pen.); Zukić 90+3'	Stadium: Mladost Stadium; Attendance: 300; Referee: (Serbia) Aleksandar Živković

8 August 2021 4	Vojvodina	2–0	Voždovac	Novi Sad
18:55	Simić 25'; Topić 37'	Report		Stadium: Karađorđe Stadium; Attendance: 1,087; Referee: (Serbia) Srđan Jovanović

16 August 2021 5	Spartak	2–2	Vojvodina	Subotica
19:00	Marčić 51'; Srećković 62'	Report	Simić 33'; Stevanović 68'; Cucin (red card) 90'	Stadium: Subotica City Stadium; Attendance: 1,300; Referee: (Serbia) Milan Mitić

22 August 2021 6	Vojvodina	2–1	Novi Pazar	Novi Sad
16:30	Vukadinović 10'; Mrkaić 78'	Report	Aganspahić 48'	Stadium: Karađorđe Stadium; Attendance: 1,140; Referee: (Serbia) Pavle Tomić

29 August 2021 7	Napredak	2–0	Vojvodina	Kruševac
16:00	Kunić 12'; Kerkez 74'	Report		Stadium: Mladost Stadium (Kruševac); Attendance: 800; Referee: (Serbia) Srđan Jovanović

11 September 2021 8	Vojvodina	2–2	Metalac GM	Novi Sad
16:00	Vukadinović 36'; Čović 73'	Report	Antonijević 29'; Stuparević 40'	Stadium: Karađorđe Stadium; Attendance: 1,200; Referee: (Serbia) Jovan Šegrt

17 September 2021 9	Radnik	0–2	Vojvodina	Surdulica
19:00		Report	Simić 26'; Bastajić 31'	Stadium: Surdulica City Stadium; Attendance: 800; Referee: (Serbia) Andrija Stojanović

21 September 2021 10	Vojvodina	2–1	Kolubara	Novi Sad
18:30	Đuranović 14' (o.g.); Simić 51'	Report	Andrić 90+1'	Stadium: Karađorđe Stadium; Attendance: 1,000; Referee: (Serbia) Stanko Ostraćanin

25 September 2021 11	TSC	1–0	Vojvodina	Bačka Topola
16:00	Rajković 48'	Report		Stadium: TSC Arena; Attendance: 3,200; Referee: (Serbia) Nenad Minaković

3 October 2021 12	Vojvodina	1–1	Radnički Niš	Novi Sad
20:00	Topić 70'	Report	Arsić 34'	Stadium: Karađorđe Stadium; Attendance: 1,025; Referee: (Serbia) Novak Simović

16 October 2021 13	Čukarički	1–1	Vojvodina	Belgrade
18:00	Tošić 67'	Report	Mrkaić 45'	Stadium: Čukarički Stadium; Attendance: 300; Referee: (Serbia) Andrija Stojanović

24 October 2021 14	Vojvodina	3–1	Radnički Kragujevac	Novi Sad
17:00	Vukadinović 47'; Simić 53'; Čović 69' (pen.)	Report	Trifunović 37'	Stadium: Karađorđe Stadium; Attendance: 1,200; Referee: (Serbia) Milan Stefanović

1 November 2021 15	Proleter	0–1	Vojvodina	Novi Sad
18:00		Report	Vukadinović 10'	Stadium: Karađorđe Stadium; Attendance: 400; Referee: (Serbia) Nenad Minaković

7 November 2021 16	Vojvodina	1–2	Red Star Belgrade	Novi Sad
16:45	Dragović 31' (o.g.)	Report	Pavkov 54'; Dragović 62'	Stadium: Karađorđe Stadium; Attendance: 7,100; Referee: (Serbia) Momčilo Marković

21 November 2021 17	Partizan	4–1	Vojvodina	Belgrade
15:45	Pantić 35'; Menig 42'; Gomes 69'; Jojić 72'	Report	Simić 48'	Stadium: Partizan Stadium; Attendance: 2,200; Referee: (Serbia) Lazar Lukić

29 November 2021 18	Vojvodina	3–1	Mladost	Novi Sad
17:00	Zukić 30' (pen.); Vukadinović 32', 71'	Report	Jovanović 68'	Stadium: Karađorđe Stadium; Attendance: 550; Referee: (Serbia) Novak Simović

7 December 2021 19	Voždovac	3–1	Vojvodina	Belgrade
14:00	Ivezić 22'; Milosavljević 74'; Vujnović 78'	Report	Hajdin 23' (o.g.)	Stadium: Voždovac Stadium; Attendance: 300; Referee: (Serbia) Dejan Trifković

14 December 2021 20	Vojvodina	2–3	Spartak	Novi Sad
15:00	Čović 60'; Simić 69'	Report	Bijelović 24'; Nikolić 34'; Maksimović 90+3' (o.g.)	Stadium: Karađorđe Stadium; Attendance: 600; Referee: (Serbia) Nikola Radaković

18 December 2021 21	Novi Pazar	1–1	Vojvodina	Novi Pazar
13:00	Ratković 66'	Report	Mrkaić (red card) 7'; Bastajić 57'; Nešković (red card) 72'	Stadium: Novi Pazar City Stadium; Attendance: 1,000; Referee: (Serbia) Novak Simović

14 February 2022 22	Vojvodina	1–0	Napredak	Novi Sad
15:00	Simić 53'	Report		Stadium: Karađorđe Stadium; Attendance: 600; Referee: (Serbia) Momčilo Marković

21 February 2022 23	Metalac GM	2–3	Vojvodina	Gornji Milanovac
15:00	Stuparević 23'; Stojić 70'	Report	Vukčević 41'; Čović 47'; Matić 90+1'	Stadium: Stadion Metalac; Attendance: 1,000; Referee: (Serbia) Stanko Ostraćanin

26 February 2022 24	Vojvodina	0–1	Radnik	Novi Sad
16:00	Đorđević (red card) 34'	Report	Duronjić 59'	Stadium: Karađorđe Stadium; Attendance: 800; Referee: (Serbia) Jovan Šegrt

2 March 2022 25	Kolubara	1–0	Vojvodina	Lazarevac
18:00	Bakić 8'	Report	Čović (red card) 48'	Stadium: Stadion FK Kolubara; Attendance: 620; Referee: (Serbia) Miloš Milanović

6 March 2022 26	Vojvodina	0–1	TSC	Novi Sad
18:30		Report	Škuletić 75'	Stadium: Karađorđe Stadium; Attendance: 1,000; Referee: (Serbia) Aleksandar Živković

12 March 2022 27	Radnički Niš	1–0	Vojvodina	Niš
17:00	Pejović 16' (pen.)	Report		Stadium: Čair Stadium; Attendance: 700; Referee: (Serbia) Dejan Trifković

19 March 2022 28	Vojvodina	1–2	Čukarički	Novi Sad
18:00	Matić 27' (pen.)	Report	N'Diaye 51'; Rakonjac 79'	Stadium: Karađorđe Stadium; Attendance: 1,000; Referee: (Serbia) Lazar Lukić

2 April 2022 29	Radnički Kragujevac	3–2	Vojvodina	Kragujevac
14:00	Vidović 6'; Mirić 33'; Tomić 63' (pen.)	Report	Matić 76'; Zukić 90+5' (pen.)	Stadium: Čika Dača Stadium; Attendance: 1,500; Referee: (Serbia) Pavle Tomić

11 April 2022 30	Vojvodina	2–1	Proleter	Novi Sad
18:30	Andrejević 9' (o.g.); Simić 11'	Report	Stevanović 75' (o.g.)	Stadium: Karađorđe Stadium; Attendance: 1,000; Referee: (Serbia) Nenad Minaković

==== Championship round league table ====
Pos	Team	Pld	W	D	L	GF	GA	GD	Pts	Qualification	RSB	PAR	ČUK	RNI	VOŽ	TSC	VOJ	NAP
4	Radnički Niš	37	12	15	10	40	39	+1	51	Qualification to Europa Conference League second qualifying round					0–0	2–0	1–0	
5	Voždovac	37	13	10	14	48	45	+3	49			0–3					2–1	3–0
6	TSC	37	13	9	15	51	56	−5	48		0–4				1–1		0–2	2–0
7	Vojvodina	37	13	6	18	44	51	−7	45		0–3		0–3					2–0
8	Napredak Kruševac	37	10	8	19	31	51	−20	38		0–1	0–3		0–4				

Source: SuperLiga (in Serbian)
Rules for classification: 1) Points; 2) Points in regular season; 3) Head-to-head points in regular season; 4) Head-to-head goal difference in regular season; 5) Head-to-head goals scored in regular season; 6) Head-to-head away goals scored in regular season (if two teams tied); 7) Goal difference; 8) Goals scored; 9) Fair play ranking; 10) Drawing of lots.

==== Championship round result round by round ====
Round	1	2	3	4	5	6	7
Ground	H	A	A	H	A	H	A
Result	W	L	L	L	L	L	W
Position	5	7	7	7	7	7	7

Updated to match(es) played on 22 May 2022. Source: https://www.superliga.rs/sezone/2021-22/team/5-super-liga-srbije-2021-22/15-vojvodina
A = Away; H = Home; W = Win; D = Draw; L = Loss

==== Championship round matches ====
17 April 2022 31	Vojvodina	2–0	Napredak	Novi Sad
18:00	Maksimović 76'; Mršić 90+4' (o.g.)	Report		Stadium: Karađorđe Stadium; Attendance: 1,000; Referee: (Serbia) Andrija Stojanović

21 April 2022 32	Voždovac	2–1	Vojvodina	Belgrade
19:05	Ivezić 33'; Mijailović 58'	Report	Simić 30' (pen.)	Stadium: Voždovac Stadium; Attendance: 500; Referee: (Serbia) Milan Mitić

26 April 2022 33	Radnički Niš	1–0	Vojvodina	Niš
18:30	Michibuchi 49'	Report		Stadium: Čair Stadium; Attendance: 1,000; Referee: (Serbia) Pavle Tomić

1 May 2022 34	Vojvodina	0–3	Red Star Belgrade	Novi Sad
17:00		Report	Pavkov 2'; Katai 34', 70'	Stadium: Karađorđe Stadium; Attendance: 2,600; Referee: (Serbia) Dejan Trifković

7 May 2022 35	Partizan	2–1	Vojvodina	Belgrade
14:00	Terzić 4'; Gomes 41'	Report	Nešković 90+3'	Stadium: Partizan Stadium; Attendance: 1,500; Referee: (Serbia) Miloš Milanović

15 May 2022 36	Vojvodina	0–3	Čukarički	Novi Sad
16:30		Report	Roganović 13'; Savić 79'; Docić 88' (pen.)	Stadium: Karađorđe Stadium; Attendance: 1,000; Referee: (Serbia) Marko Srećković

22 May 2022 37	TSC	0–2	Vojvodina	Bačka Topola
18:30		Report	Matić 48'; Lazarević 72'	Stadium: TSC Arena; Attendance: 2,000; Referee: (Serbia) Novak Simović

=== Serbian Cup ===
27 October 2021 Round of 32	Vojvodina	5–1	Jagodina	Novi Sad
16:00	Bastajić 24'; Simić 32'; Đorđević 50' (o.g.); Čović 52'; Zukić 87'	Report	Stojanović 10'	Stadium: Karađorđe Stadium; Attendance: 530; Referee: (Serbia) Miroslav Matić

2 December 2021 Round of 16	Javor	1–1 (1–4 p)	Vojvodina	Ivanjica
15:00	Odita 59'	Report	Vukadinović 82'	Stadium: Ivanjica Stadium; Attendance: 500; Referee: Milan Mitić

6 April 2022 Quarter-finals	Rad	0–4	Vojvodina	Belgrade, Serbia
18:30		Report	Vukčević 10'; Simić 17' (pen.); Topić 24'; Zukić 45+1' (pen.)	Stadium: King Peter I Stadium; Attendance: 600; Referee: Aleksandar Živković

11 May 2022 Semi-finals	Partizan	2–1	Vojvodina	Belgrade, Serbia
16:30	Gomes 4'; Menig 43'	Report	Zukić 52'	Stadium: Partizan Stadium; Attendance: 5,000; Referee: Stanko Ostraćanin

=== UEFA Europa Conference League ===
22 July 2021 Second qualifying round (First leg)	FK Panevėžys (Lithuania)	0–1	(Serbia) Vojvodina	Panevėžys, Lithuania
17:30		Report	Čović 70'	Stadium: Aukštaitija Stadium; Attendance: 1,502; Referee: (Luxembourg) Alain Durieux

29 July 2021 Second qualifying round (Second leg)	Vojvodina (Serbia)	1–0	(Lithuania) FK Panevėžys	Novi Sad, Serbia
20:00	Kabić 90+6'	Report		Stadium: Karađorđe Stadium; Attendance: 3,320; Referee: (Estonia) Juri Frischer

5 August 2021 Third qualifying round (First leg)	Vojvodina (Serbia)	0–1	(Austria) LASK	Novi Sad, Serbia
19:00	Cucin (red card) 90+1'	Report	Michorl 70'	Stadium: Karađorđe Stadium; Attendance: 2,126; Referee: (Italy) Michael Fabbri

12 August 2021 Third qualifying round (Second leg)	LASK (Austria)	6–1	(Serbia) Vojvodina	Klagenfurt, Austria
21:00	Karamoko 34' (pen.), 53'; Goiginger 56'; Potzmann 67'; Balić 80'; Schmidt 87'	Report	Kabić 13'	Stadium: Wörthersee Stadion; Attendance: 769; Referee: (France) Benoît Millot

== Statistics ==
=== Squad statistics ===
No.	Pos	Nat	Player	Total		SuperLiga		Cup		Conference League	
No.	Pos	Nat	Player	Apps	Goals	Apps	Goals	Apps	Goals	Apps	Goals
Goalkeepers
1	GK	(Serbia) SRB	Nikola Simić	22	0	18	0	0	0	4	0
13	GK	(Bosnia and Herzegovina) BIH	Goran Vukliš	6	0	4	0	2	0	0	0
42	GK	(Serbia) SRB	Emil Rockov	18	0	16	0	2	0	0	0
Defenders
2	DF	(Serbia) SRB	Marko Bjeković	16	0	14	0	2	0	0	0
3	DF	(Serbia) SRB	Mladen Devetak	34	0	29	0	1	0	4	0
5	DF	(Serbia) SRB	Dušan Stevanović	35	1	28	1	3	0	4	0
6	DF	(Serbia) SRB	Vladimir Kovačević	26	0	18	0	4	0	4	0
11	DF	(Serbia) SRB	Stefan Đorđević	19	0	16	0	3	0	0	0
12	DF	(Montenegro) MNE	Boris Kopitović	14	0	13	0	1	0	0	0
15	DF	(Serbia) SRB	Igor Jeličić	35	0	30	0	4	0	1	0
50	DF	(Serbia) SRB	Milan Lazarević	17	1	15	1	2	0	0	0
Midfielders
4	MF	(Serbia) SRB	Novica Maksimović	32	1	25	1	4	0	3	0
8	MF	(Serbia) SRB	Mirko Topić	37	3	31	2	2	1	4	0
10	MF	(Serbia) SRB	Dejan Zukić	36	6	28	3	4	3	4	0
14	MF	(Serbia) SRB	Vladimir Miletić	11	0	9	0	2	0	0	0
17	MF	(Serbia) SRB	Mihajlo Nešković	20	1	17	1	3	0	0	0
18	MF	(Serbia) SRB	Aleksandar Busnić	34	0	28	0	2	0	4	0
19	MF	(North Macedonia) MKD	Vladan Novevski	18	0	12	0	2	0	4	0
21	MF	(Serbia) SRB	Veljko Simić	42	12	34	10	4	2	4	0
33	MF	(Serbia) SRB	Ognjen Abramušić	2	0	2	0	0	0	0	0
70	MF	(Serbia) SRB	Uroš Kabić	26	2	19	0	3	0	4	2
90	MF	(Serbia) SRB	Miljan Vukadinović	33	7	30	6	2	1	1	0
Forwards
9	FW	(Serbia) SRB	Bojan Matić	16	4	15	4	1	0	0	0
23	FW	(Bosnia and Herzegovina) BIH	Momčilo Mrkaić	22	2	16	2	2	0	4	0
34	MF	(Serbia) SRB	Mihailo Ivanović	1	0	1	0	0	0	0	0
44	FW	(Serbia) SRB	Nebojša Bastajić	36	3	30	2	2	1	4	0
99	FW	(Montenegro) MNE	Ivan Vukčević	18	2	16	1	2	1	0	0
Players transferred out during the season
7	FW	(Serbia) SRB	Nemanja Čović	30	7	24	5	2	1	4	1
32	GK	(Serbia) SRB	Nemanja Toroman	0	0	0	0	0	0	0	0
22	DF	(Serbia) SRB	Luka Cucin	8	0	5	0	0	0	3	0

Last updated: 22 May 2022
Source: Competitions

=== Goal scorers ===
Rank	No.	Pos	Nat	Name	SuperLiga	Serbian Cup	Europe	Total
1	21	MF	(Serbia)	Veljko Simić	10	2	0	12
2	90	MF	(Serbia)	Miljan Vukadinović	6	1	0	7
2	7	FW	(Serbia)	Nemanja Čović	5	1	1	7
3	10	MF	(Serbia)	Dejan Zukić	3	3	0	6
3	—	—		Own goals	5	1	0	6
4	9	FW	(Serbia)	Bojan Matić	4	0	0	4
5	8	MF	(Serbia)	Mirko Topić	2	1	0	3
5	44	FW	(Serbia)	Nebojša Bastajić	2	1	0	3
6	23	FW	(Bosnia and Herzegovina)	Momčilo Mrkaić	2	0	0	2
6	99	FW	(Montenegro)	Ivan Vukčević	1	1	0	2
6	70	MF	(Serbia)	Uroš Kabić	0	0	2	2
7	5	DF	(Serbia)	Dušan Stevanović	1	0	0	1
7	4	MF	(Serbia)	Novica Maksimović	1	0	0	1
7	17	MF	(Serbia)	Mihajlo Nešković	1	0	0	1
7	50	DF	(Serbia)	Milan Lazarević	1	0	0	1
Totals					44	11	3	58

Last updated: 22 May 2022

=== Clean sheets ===
Rank	No.	Pos	Nat	Name	SuperLiga	Serbian Cup	Europe	Total
1	1	GK	(Serbia)	Nikola Simić	4	0	2	6
2	42	GK	(Serbia)	Emil Rockov	3	1	0	4
3	13	GK	(Bosnia and Herzegovina)	Goran Vukliš	1	0	0	1
Totals					8	1	2	11

Last updated: 22 May 2022

=== Disciplinary record ===
Number	Nation	Position	Name	SuperLiga		Serbian Cup		Europe		Total	
Number	Nation	Position	Name	Booked	Sent off (straight red)	Booked	Sent off (straight red)	Booked	Sent off (straight red)	Booked	Sent off (straight red)
1	(Serbia)	GK	Nikola Simić	2	0	0	0	0	0	2	0
2	(Serbia)	DF	Marko Bjeković	1	0	0	0	0	0	1	0
3	(Serbia)	DF	Mladen Devetak	3	0	0	0	0	0	3	0
4	(Serbia)	MF	Novica Maksimović	9	0	0	0	1	0	10	0
5	(Serbia)	DF	Dušan Stevanović	11	0	0	0	0	0	11	0
6	(Serbia)	DF	Vladimir Kovačević	3	0	1	0	1	0	5	0
7	(Serbia)	FW	Nemanja Čović	6	1	1	0	0	0	7	1
8	(Serbia)	MF	Mirko Topić	4	0	0	0	1	0	5	0
9	(Serbia)	FW	Bojan Matić	2	0	0	0	0	0	2	0
10	(Serbia)	MF	Dejan Zukić	2	0	1	0	0	0	3	0
11	(Serbia)	DF	Stefan Đorđević	0	1	0	0	0	0	0	1
12	(Montenegro)	DF	Boris Kopitović	4	0	0	0	0	0	4	0
13	(Bosnia and Herzegovina)	GK	Goran Vukliš	2	0	0	0	0	0	2	0
14	(Serbia)	MF	Vladimir Miletić	2	0	0	0	0	0	2	0
15	(Serbia)	DF	Igor Jeličić	6	0	1	0	1	0	8	0
17	(Serbia)	MF	Mihajlo Nešković	3	1	0	0	0	0	3	1
18	(Serbia)	MF	Aleksandar Busnić	9	0	0	0	0	0	9	0
19	(North Macedonia)	MF	Vladan Novevski	0	0	0	0	1	0	1	0
21	(Serbia)	MF	Veljko Simić	3	0	0	0	2	0	5	0
22	(Serbia)	DF	Luka Cucin	2	1	0	0	2	1	4	2
23	(Bosnia and Herzegovina)	FW	Momčilo Mrkaić	1	1	0	0	0	0	1	1
42	(Serbia)	GK	Emil Rockov	1	0	0	0	0	0	1	0
44	(Serbia)	FW	Nebojša Bastajić	4	0	0	0	1	0	5	0
50	(Serbia)	DF	Milan Lazarević	7	0	0	0	0	0	7	0
70	(Serbia)	MF	Uroš Kabić	1	0	0	0	1	0	2	0
90	(Serbia)	MF	Miljan Vukadinović	1	0	0	0	0	0	1	0
99	(Montenegro)	FW	Ivan Vukčević	2	0	0	0	0	0	2	0
			TOTALS	91	5	4	0	11	1	106	6

Last updated: 22 May 2022

=== Game as captain ===
Rank	No.	Pos	Nat	Name	SuperLiga	Serbian Cup	Europe	Total
1	7	FW	(Serbia)	Nemanja Čović	24	2	4	30
2	10	MF	(Serbia)	Dejan Zukić	10	2	0	12
3	4	MF	(Serbia)	Novica Maksimović	2	0	0	2
4	8	MF	(Serbia)	Mirko Topić	1	0	0	1
Totals					37	4	4	45

Last updated: 22 May 2022

=== Attendances ===
	Matches	Attendances	Average	High	Low
SuperLiga	18	31,517	1,751	7,615	550
Serbian Cup	1	530	530	530	530
Conference League	2	5,446	2,723	3,320	2,126
Total	21	37,493	1,785	7,615	530

Last updated: 22 May 2022
