= 2020–21 FK Vojvodina season =

FK Vojvodina
2020–21 season
- President: Dragoljub Samardžić
- Head coach: Nenad Lalatović
- Stadium: Karađorđe Stadium
- Serbian SuperLiga: 4th
- Serbian Cup: Semi-finals
- Europa League: Third qualifying round
- Top goalscorer: League: Miljan Vukadinović (11 goals); All: Nemanja Čović (12 goals)
| Home colours | Away colours |
- All statistics correct as of May 20, 2021.

The 2020–21 season was Vojvodina's 106th season in existence and the club's 15th competing in the Serbian SuperLiga. The whole season was played behind closed doors due to COVID-19 pandemic.

== Transfers ==
=== In ===
| Date | Position | Name | From | Type | Ref. |
| 23 July 2020 | GK | (Serbia) Goran Vukliš | (Serbia) Kabel | Free Transfer | |
| 27 July 2020 | DF | (Serbia) Vladimir Kovačević | (Belgium) Kortrijk | Free Transfer | |
| 28 July 2020 | MF | (Serbia) Novica Maksimović | (Greece) Panionis | Free Transfer | |
| 30 September 2020 | GK | (Serbia) Željko Brkić | Free Agent | Free Transfer | |
Winter transfers
| 13 January 2021 | MF | (Serbia) Veljko Simić | (Serbia) Red Star Belgrade | Free Transfer | |

=== Out ===
| Date | Position | Name | To | Type | Ref. |
|---|---|---|---|---|---|
| 17 July 2020 | GK | (Serbia) Emil Rockov | (Hungary) Fehérvár | Transfer | |
| 23 July 2020 | MF | (Serbia) Jovan Kokir | (Serbia) Metalac | Free Transfer | |
| 24 July 2020 | DF | (Serbia) Igor Jeličić | (Serbia) Kabel | Loan | |
| 24 July 2020 | GK | (Serbia) Vukašin Pilipović | (Serbia) Bačka Subotica | Loan | |
| 24 July 2020 | MF | (Montenegro) Petar Pavlićević | (Serbia) Kabel | Loan | |
| 29 July 2020 | MF | (Serbia) Mihajlo Nešković | (Serbia) Inđija | Loan | |
| 27 August 2020 | DF | (England) Lazar Stojsavljević | (Serbia) Rad | Loan | |
Winter transfers
| 13 January 2021 | FW | (Serbia) Ognjen Đuričin | (Serbia) Radnički Niš | Transfer | |
| 13 January 2021 | MF | (Serbia) Đorđe Pantelić | (Serbia) Inđija | Loan | |
| 13 January 2021 | FW | (Serbia) Vukašin Bogdanović | (Serbia) Kabel | Loan | |
| 28 February 2021 | MF | (Serbia) Bogdan Mladenović | (Iraq) Al-Diwaniya | Loan | |

== Friendlies ==
Due to the corona virus, Vojvodina did not play a single friendly match in summer 2020.

| 16 January 2021 | Altay (Turkey) | 1–1 | Vojvodina | Belek, Turkey |
| 14:30 | Šćuk 89' | Report | Belkay 57' (o.g.) | Stadium: Football centre Cornelia; Attendance: 0 |

| 19 January 2021 | Zorya (Ukraine) | 2–2 | Vojvodina | Belek, Turkey |
| 15:00 | Khomchenovskyi 5'; Nazaryna 77' | Report | Zukić 14'; Simić 63' | Stadium: Susesi; Attendance: 0 |

| 22 January 2021 | Mura (Slovenia) | 5–1 | Vojvodina | Belek, Turkey |
| 13:30 | Bobičanec 10'; Maruško 33'; Klepač 46'; Đurak 66'; Maroša 88' | Report | Bralić 30' | Stadium: Susesi; Attendance: 0 |

| 25 January 2021 | Slavia Sofia (Bulgaria) | 0–1 | Vojvodina | Belek, Turkey |
| 14:00 | | Report | Mladenović 70' | Stadium: Susesi; Attendance: 0 |

| 28 January 2021 | Akhmat Grozny (Russia) | 1–1 | Vojvodina | Belek, Turkey |
| 15:00 | Nižić 50' | Report | Bralić 62' | Stadium: Football centre Cornelia; Attendance: 0 |

== Competitions ==
=== Serbian SuperLiga ===
==== Regular season ====
===== League table =====
| Pos | Team | Pld | W | D | L | GF | GA | GD | Pts | Qualification or relegation |
|---|---|---|---|---|---|---|---|---|---|---|
| 2 | Partizan | 38 | 31 | 2 | 5 | 95 | 20 | +75 | 95 | Qualification to Europa Conference League second qualifying round |
| 3 | Čukarički | 38 | 22 | 8 | 8 | 69 | 34 | +35 | 74 | Qualification to Europa Conference League second qualifying round |
| 4 | Vojvodina | 38 | 21 | 8 | 9 | 62 | 41 | +21 | 71 | Qualification to Europa Conference League second qualifying round |
| 5 | TSC | 38 | 17 | 7 | 14 | 68 | 50 | +18 | 58 | |
| 6 | Radnik Surdulica | 38 | 16 | 7 | 15 | 55 | 49 | +6 | 55 | |

Source: SuperLiga (in Serbian), Soccerway
Rules for classification: 1) Points; 2) Head-to-head points; 3) Head-to-head goal difference; 4) Head-to-head goals scored; 5) Head-to-head away goals scored (if two teams tied); 6) Goal difference; 7) Goals scored; 8) Fair play ranking; 9) Draw.

===== Results by matchday =====
| Round | 1 | 2 | 3 | 4 | 5 | 6 | 7 | 8 | 9 | 10 | 11 | 12 | 13 | 14 | 15 | 16 | 17 | 18 | 19 | 20 | 21 | 22 | 23 | 24 | 25 | 26 | 27 | 28 | 29 | 30 | 31 | 32 | 33 | 34 | 35 | 36 | 37 | 38 |
|---|---|---|---|---|---|---|---|---|---|---|---|---|---|---|---|---|---|---|---|---|---|---|---|---|---|---|---|---|---|---|---|---|---|---|---|---|---|---|
| Ground | A | H | A | H | A | H | A | H | A | A | H | A | H | A | H | A | H | A | H | H | A | H | A | H | A | H | A | H | H | A | H | A | H | A | H | A | H | A |
| Result | D | D | W | W | W | W | L | W | W | L | W | W | W | D | L | W | W | W | W | L | D | W | D | W | L | W | D | W | W | L | W | W | L | L | D | W | D | L |
| Position | 10 | 15 | 9 | 8 | 6 | 4 | 7 | 3 | 3 | 3 | 3 | 2 | 2 | 2 | 3 | 3 | 3 | 3 | 3 | 3 | 3 | 3 | 3 | 3 | 4 | 3 | 3 | 3 | 3 | 4 | 3 | 3 | 3 | 4 | 4 | 3 | 3 | 4 |

Updated to match(es) played on 20 May 2021. Source: https://www.superliga.rs/sezone/2020-21/team/5-super-liga-srbije-2020-21/15-vojvodina
A = Away; H = Home; W = Win; D = Draw; L = Loss

=== Results ===
| 31 July 2020 1 | TSC | 2–2 | Vojvodina | Senta |
| 19:00 | Lukić 26'; Silađi 79' | Report | Mrkaić 35'; Varga 49' (o.g.) | Stadium: Stadium Senta; Attendance: 0 Referee: (Serbia) Novak Simović |

| 5 August 2020 2 | Vojvodina | 2–2 | Čukarički | Novi Sad |
| 21:00 | Čović 56'; Saničanin 57' | Report | Šapić 40'; Okeuhie 54' | Stadium: Karađorđe Stadium; Attendance: 0 Referee: (Serbia) Miloš Đorđić |

| 9 August 2020 3 | Voždovac | 1–3 | Vojvodina | Belgrade |
| 20:30 | Gajić 53' | Report | Bojić 6'; Saničanin 28'; Gemović 32' | Stadium: Voždovac Stadium; Attendance: 0 Referee: (Serbia) Miloš Milanović |

| 16 August 2020 4 | Vojvodina | 3–0 | Mladost | Novi Sad |
| 20:00 | Bojić 70'; Saničanin 84'; Đuričin 87' | Report | | Stadium: Karađorđe Stadium; Attendance: 0 Referee: (Serbia) Srđan Jovanović |

| 23 August 2020 5 | Napredak | 0–1 | Vojvodina | Kruševac |
| 17:30 | | Report | Đorđević 58' | Stadium: Mladost Stadium (Kruševac); Attendance: 0 Referee: (Serbia) Stanko Ostraćanin |

| 30 August 2020 6 | Vojvodina | 3–2 | Partizan | Novi Sad |
| 18:45 | Vukadinović 51'; Mladenović 89'; Stojković 90+3' | Report | Sadiq 40'; Šćekić 69' | Stadium: Karađorđe Stadium; Attendance: 0 Referee: (Serbia) Srđan Jovanović |

| 13 September 2020 7 | Javor | 2–1 | Vojvodina | Ivanjica |
| 18:00 | Piščević 34'; Luković 61' | Report | Bojić 90+5' | Stadium: Ivanjica Stadium; Attendance: 0 Referee: (Serbia) Miloš Milanović |

| 18 September 2020 8 | Vojvodina | 2–0 | Radnik | Novi Sad |
| 18:00 | Bojić 56'; Čović 67' (pen.) | Report | | Stadium: Karađorđe Stadium; Attendance: 0 Referee: (Serbia) Marko Ivković |

| 28 September 2020 9 | Inđija | 0–2 | Vojvodina | Inđija |
| 16:00 | | Report | Bojić 58'; Čović 70' | Stadium: Inđija Stadium; Attendance: 0 Referee: (Serbia) Milan Mitić |

| 3 October 2020 10 | Novi Pazar | 3–1 | Vojvodina | Novi Pazar |
| 16:00 | Marković 26', 29', 44' | Report | Bojić 69' | Stadium: Novi Pazar City Stadium; Attendance: 0 Referee: (Serbia) Petar Piper |

| 16 October 2020 11 | Vojvodina | 4–1 | Rad | Novi Sad |
| 18:00 | Bralić 12'; Čović 55'; Bojić 68'; Vukadinović 70' (pen.) | Report | Živković 3' | Stadium: Karađorđe Stadium; Attendance: 0 Referee: (Serbia) Andrija Stojanović |

| 25 October 2020 12 | Zlatibor | 0–2 | Vojvodina | Užice |
| 14:00 | | Report | Drinčić 58'; Andrić 78' | Stadium: Užice City Stadium; Attendance: 0 Referee: (Serbia) Momčilo Marković |

| 30 October 2020 13 | Vojvodina | 3–1 | Bačka | Novi Sad |
| 18:00 | Zukić 26'; Bojić 40'; Vukadinović 61' | Report | Krčmarević 82' | Stadium: Karađorđe Stadium; Attendance: 0 Referee: (Serbia) Zoran Široki |

| 6 November 2020 14 | Metalac GM | 3–3 | Vojvodina | Gornji Milanovac |
| 18:00 | Katanić 33'; Arambašić 86'; Grbović 90+2' | Report | Mrkaić 17'; Čović 73'; Đuričin 78' | Stadium: Stadion Metalac; Attendance: 0 Referee: (Serbia) Novak Simović |

| 22 November 2020 15 | Vojvodina | 0–2 | Red Star Belgrade | Novi Sad |
| 17:30 | | Report | Gajić 26'; Ben 75' (pen.) | Stadium: Karađorđe Stadium; Attendance: 0 Referee: (Serbia) Novak Simović |

| 30 November 2020 16 | Radnički Niš | 0–1 | Vojvodina | Niš |
| 16:00 | | Report | Vukadinović 14' | Stadium: Čair Stadium; Attendance: 0 Referee: (Serbia) Miloš Milanović |

| 5 December 2020 17 | Vojvodina | 1–0 | Mačva | Novi Sad |
| 14:00 | Mrkaić 32' | Report | | Stadium: Karađorđe Stadium; Attendance: 0 Referee: (Serbia) Milan Mitić |

| 12 December 2020 18 | Spartak | 0–1 | Vojvodina | Subotica |
| 14:00 | | Report | Gemović 50' | Stadium: Subotica City Stadium; Attendance: 0 Referee: (Serbia) Miloš Milanović |

| 17 December 2020 19 | Vojvodina | 2–0 | Proleter | Novi Sad |
| 15:00 | Vukadinović 52', 90+1' | Report | | Stadium: Karađorđe Stadium; Attendance: 0 Referee: (Serbia) Srđan Jovanović |

| 5 February 2021 20 | Vojvodina | 0–1 | TSC | Novi Sad |
| 16:30 | | Report | Petković 30' | Stadium: Karađorđe Stadium; Attendance: 0 Referee: (Serbia) Srđan Jovanović |

| 12 February 2021 21 | Čukarički | 3–3 | Vojvodina | Belgrade |
| 18:30 | Birmančević 5'; Ćirković 12'; Čolović 90+8' | Report | Vukadinović 64' (pen.), 65'; Simić 80' | Stadium: Čukarički Stadium; Attendance: 0 Referee: (Serbia) Miloš Milanović |

| 17 February 2021 22 | Vojvodina | 2–0 | Voždovac | Novi Sad |
| 16:00 | Vukadinović 49'; Bojić 80' | Report | | Stadium: Karađorđe Stadium; Attendance: 0 Referee: (Serbia) Momčilo Marković |

| 21 February 2021 23 | Mladost | 1–1 | Vojvodina | Lučani |
| 13:00 | Bojović 63' (pen.) | Report | Vukadinović 18' | Stadium: Mladost Stadium; Attendance: 0 Referee: (Serbia) Srđan Jovanović |

| 26 February 2021 24 | Vojvodina | 1–0 | Napredak | Novi Sad |
| 15:30 | Čović 53' (pen.) | Report | | Stadium: Karađorđe Stadium; Attendance: 0 Referee: (Serbia) Miloš Đorđić |

| 2 March 2021 25 | Partizan | 2–0 | Vojvodina | Belgrade |
| 16:00 | Asano 25', 64' | Report | | Stadium: Partizan Stadium; Attendance: 0 Referee: (Serbia) Miloš Milanović |

| 7 March 2021 26 | Vojvodina | 2–0 | Javor | Novi Sad |
| 15:00 | Gemović 9'; Zukić 30' | Report | | Stadium: Karađorđe Stadium; Attendance: 0 Referee: (Serbia) Andrija Stojanović |

| 15 March 2021 27 | Radnik | 2–2 | Vojvodina | Surdulica |
| 14:00 | Danoski 30'; Bjeković 43' (o.g.) | Report | Drinčić 45+1'; Bogdanovski 74' (o.g.) | Stadium: Surdulica City Stadium; Attendance: 0 Referee: (Serbia) Zoran Široki |

| 21 March 2021 28 | Vojvodina | 2–1 | Inđija | Novi Sad |
| 15:00 | Stojković 17' (pen.); Simić 19' | Report | Bastajić 90+2' (pen.) | Stadium: Karađorđe Stadium; Attendance: 0 Referee: (Serbia) Novica Anđelovski |

| 2 April 2021 29 | Vojvodina | 1–0 | Novi Pazar | Novi Sad |
| 17:00 | Mrkaić 66' | Report | | Stadium: Karađorđe Stadium; Attendance: 0 Referee: (Serbia) Pavle Tomić |

| 7 April 2021 30 | Rad | 2–0 | Vojvodina | Belgrade |
| 14:00 | Kaluđerović 48' (pen.), 52' | Report | | Stadium: King Peter I Stadium; Attendance: 0 Referee: (Serbia) Zoran Široki |

| 12 April 2021 31 | Vojvodina | 2–1 | Zlatibor | Novi Sad |
| 18:00 | Zukić 32'; Vukadinović 77' | Report | Vukić 63' | Stadium: Karađorđe Stadium; Attendance: 0 Referee: (Serbia) Marko Srećković |

| 16 April 2021 32 | Bačka | 1–2 | Vojvodina | Bačka Palanka |
| 16:00 | Zličić 61' | Report | Gemović 6', 28' | Stadium: Stadion Slavko Maletin Vava; Attendance: 0 Referee: (Serbia) Đorđe Maksimović |

| 25 April 2021 33 | Vojvodina | 1–2 | Metalac GM | Novi Sad |
| 14:30 | Čović 89' | Report | Cvetković 64'; Prestige 90+3' | Stadium: Karađorđe Stadium; Attendance: 0 Referee: (Serbia) Milan Ilić |

| 29 April 2021 34 | Red Star Belgrade | 1–0 | Vojvodina | Belgrade |
| 18:55 | Saničanin 13' (o.g.) | Report | | Stadium: Rajko Mitić Stadium; Attendance: 0 Referee: (Serbia) Danilo Grujić |

| 5 May 2021 35 | Vojvodina | 0–0 | Radnički Niš | Novi Sad |
| 16:00 | | Report | | Stadium: Karađorđe Stadium; Attendance: 0 Referee: (Serbia) Pavle Tomić |

| 9 May 2021 36 | Mačva | 2–5 | Vojvodina | Šabac |
| 14:30 | Adamović (45+1.); Ortiz 85' | Report | Čović 6', 14'; Zukić 33'; Simić 73'; Mrkaić 75' | Stadium: Šabac city Stadium; Attendance: 0 Referee: (Serbia) Marko Srećković |

| 14 May 2021 37 | Vojvodina | 1–1 | Spartak | Novi Sad |
| 16:00 | Mrkaić 75' | Report | Tufegdžić 13' | Stadium: Karađorđe Stadium; Attendance: 0 Referee: (Serbia) Miloš Milanović |

| 19 May 2021 38 | Proleter | 2–0 | Vojvodina | Novi Sad |
| 18:30 | Knežević 62'; Mirosavljev 86' | Report | | Stadium: Karađorđe Stadium; Attendance: 0 Referee: (Serbia) Đorđe Maksimović |

=== Serbian Cup ===
| 21 October 2020 Round of 32 | Jedinstvo Rumenka | 0–2 | Vojvodina | Rumenka |
| 14:30 | | Report | Đekić 60' (o.g.); Čović 71' (pen.) | Stadium: FK Jedinstvo Rumenka Stadium; Attendance: 0 Referee: (Serbia) Nikola Petrović |

| 26 November 2020 Round of 16 | Proleter | 0–2 | Vojvodina | Novi Sad |
| 16:00 | | Report | Čović 61'; Zukić 90+3' | Stadium: Karađorđe Stadium; Attendance: 0 Referee: (Serbia) Lazar Lukić |

| 11 March 2021 Quarter-finals | Spartak | 1–2 | Vojvodina | Subotica |
| 15:00 | Shimura 62' | Report | Čović 58'; Bojić 69' | Stadium: Subotica City Stadium; Attendance: 0 Referee: (Serbia) Nenad Minaković |

| 21 April 2021 Semi-finals | Vojvodina | 0–1 | Partizan | Novi Sad |
| 19:05 | | Report | S. Marković 11' | Stadium: Karađorđe Stadium; Attendance: 0 Referee: (Serbia) Srđan Jovanović |

=== UEFA Europa League ===
| 24 September 2020 Third qualifying round | Standard Liège (Belgium) | 2–1 (a.e.t.) | (Serbia) Vojvodina | Liège, Belgium |
| 20:00 | Avenatti 47' (pen.); Amallah 91' | Report | Bojić 75' | Stadium: Stade Maurice Dufrasne; Attendance: 0 Referee: (Austria) Harald Lechner |

== Statistics ==
=== Squad statistics ===
| No. | Pos | Nat | Player | Total | | SuperLiga | | Cup | | Europe League | |
| No. | Pos | Nat | Player | Apps | Goals | Apps | Goals | Apps | Goals | Apps | Goals |
Goalkeepers
| 13 | GK | (Bosnia and Herzegovina) BIH | Goran Vukliš | 25 | 0 | 20 | 0 | 4 | 0 | 1 | 0 |
| 17 | GK | (Serbia) SRB | Željko Brkić | 0 | 0 | 0 | 0 | 0 | 0 | 0 | 0 |
| 25 | GK | (Serbia) SRB | Nikola Simić | 18 | 0 | 18 | 0 | 0 | 0 | 0 | 0 |
| 32 | GK | (Serbia) SRB | Nemanja Toroman | 2 | 0 | 2 | 0 | 0 | 0 | 0 | 0 |
Defenders
| 2 | DF | (Serbia) SRB | Marko Bjeković | 15 | 0 | 12 | 0 | 3 | 0 | 0 | 0 |
| 3 | DF | (Serbia) SRB | Mladen Devetak | 32 | 0 | 30 | 0 | 2 | 0 | 0 | 0 |
| 5 | DF | (Bosnia and Herzegovina) BIH | Siniša Saničanin | 23 | 3 | 20 | 3 | 2 | 0 | 1 | 0 |
| 6 | DF | (Serbia) SRB | Vladimir Kovačević | 9 | 0 | 9 | 0 | 0 | 0 | 0 | 0 |
| 11 | DF | (Serbia) SRB | Stefan Đorđević | 38 | 1 | 33 | 1 | 4 | 0 | 1 | 0 |
| 15 | DF | (Serbia) SRB | Nikola Andrić | 34 | 1 | 31 | 1 | 2 | 0 | 1 | 0 |
| 20 | DF | (Serbia) SRB | Đorđe Đurić | 11 | 0 | 9 | 0 | 2 | 0 | 0 | 0 |
| 29 | DF | (Croatia) CRO | Slavko Bralić | 34 | 1 | 30 | 1 | 3 | 0 | 1 | 0 |
| 30 | DF | (Serbia) SRB | Aranđel Stojković | 41 | 2 | 36 | 2 | 4 | 0 | 1 | 0 |
Midfielders
| 4 | MF | (Serbia) SRB | Novica Maksimović | 21 | 0 | 18 | 0 | 2 | 0 | 1 | 0 |
| 8 | MF | (Serbia) SRB | Mirko Topić | 17 | 0 | 16 | 0 | 1 | 0 | 0 | 0 |
| 10 | MF | (Serbia) SRB | Dejan Zukić | 40 | 5 | 36 | 4 | 3 | 1 | 1 | 0 |
| 14 | MF | (Serbia) SRB | Vladimir Miletić | 3 | 0 | 3 | 0 | 0 | 0 | 0 | 0 |
| 18 | MF | (Montenegro) MNE | Nikola Drinčić | 38 | 2 | 33 | 2 | 4 | 0 | 1 | 0 |
| 19 | MF | (North Macedonia) MKD | Vladan Novevski | 12 | 0 | 12 | 0 | 0 | 0 | 0 | 0 |
| 21 | MF | (Serbia) SRB | Veljko Simić | 21 | 3 | 19 | 3 | 2 | 0 | 0 | 0 |
| 24 | MF | (Serbia) SRB | Petar Bojić | 33 | 11 | 28 | 9 | 4 | 1 | 1 | 1 |
| 31 | MF | (Serbia) SRB | Dragan Kokanović | 1 | 0 | 1 | 0 | 0 | 0 | 0 | 0 |
| 70 | MF | (Serbia) SRB | Uroš Kabić | 6 | 0 | 6 | 0 | 0 | 0 | 0 | 0 |
| 90 | MF | (Serbia) SRB | Miljan Vukadinović | 35 | 11 | 31 | 11 | 3 | 0 | 1 | 0 |
Forwards
| 7 | FW | (Serbia) SRB | Nemanja Čović | 35 | 12 | 30 | 9 | 4 | 3 | 1 | 0 |
| 23 | FW | (Bosnia and Herzegovina) BIH | Momčilo Mrkaić | 43 | 6 | 38 | 6 | 4 | 0 | 1 | 0 |
| 26 | FW | (Russia) RUS | Matvey Martinkevich | 1 | 0 | 1 | 0 | 0 | 0 | 0 | 0 |
| 28 | FW | (Serbia) SRB | Miodrag Gemović | 39 | 5 | 35 | 5 | 3 | 0 | 1 | 0 |
Players transferred out during the season
| 77 | MF | (Serbia) SRB | Đorđe Pantelić | 2 | 0 | 1 | 0 | 1 | 0 | 0 | 0 |
| 9 | FW | (Serbia) SRB | Vukašin Bogdanović | 0 | 0 | 0 | 0 | 0 | 0 | 0 | 0 |
| 80 | FW | (Serbia) SRB | Ognjen Đuričin | 11 | 2 | 9 | 2 | 1 | 0 | 1 | 0 |
| 22 | MF | (Serbia) SRB | Bogdan Mladenović | 15 | 1 | 13 | 1 | 2 | 0 | 0 | 0 |

Last updated: 20 May 2021
Source: Competitions

=== Goal scorers ===
| Rank | No. | Pos | Nat | Name | SuperLiga | Serbian Cup | Europe | Total |
|---|---|---|---|---|---|---|---|---|
| 1 | 7 | FW | (Serbia) | Nemanja Čović | 9 | 3 | 0 | 12 |
| 2 | 90 | MF | (Serbia) | Miljan Vukadinović | 11 | 0 | 0 | 11 |
| 3 | 24 | MF | (Serbia) | Petar Bojić | 9 | 1 | 1 | 11 |
| 4 | 23 | FW | (Bosnia and Herzegovina) | Momčilo Mrkaić | 6 | 0 | 0 | 6 |
| 5 | 28 | FW | (Serbia) | Miodrag Gemović | 5 | 0 | 0 | 5 |
| 5 | 10 | MF | (Serbia) | Dejan Zukić | 4 | 1 | 0 | 5 |
| 6 | 5 | DF | (Bosnia and Herzegovina) | Siniša Saničanin | 3 | 0 | 0 | 3 |
| 6 | 21 | MF | (Serbia) | Veljko Simić | 3 | 0 | 0 | 3 |
| 6 | — | — | | Own goal | 2 | 1 | 0 | 3 |
| 7 | 18 | MF | (Montenegro) | Nikola Drinčić | 2 | 0 | 0 | 2 |
| 7 | 30 | DF | (Serbia) | Aranđel Stojković | 2 | 0 | 0 | 2 |
| 7 | 80 | FW | (Serbia) | Ognjen Đuričin | 2 | 0 | 0 | 2 |
| 8 | 22 | MF | (Serbia) | Bogdan Mladenović | 1 | 0 | 0 | 1 |
| 8 | 11 | DF | (Serbia) | Stefan Đorđević | 1 | 0 | 0 | 1 |
| 8 | 15 | DF | (Serbia) | Nikola Andrić | 1 | 0 | 0 | 1 |
| 8 | 29 | DF | (Croatia) | Slavko Bralić | 1 | 0 | 0 | 1 |
| Totals | | | | | 62 | 6 | 1 | 69 |

Last updated: 20 May 2021

=== Clean sheets ===
| Rank | No. | Pos | Nat | Name | SuperLiga | Serbian Cup | Europe | Total |
|---|---|---|---|---|---|---|---|---|
| 1 | 13 | GK | (Bosnia and Herzegovina) | Goran Vukliš | 9 | 2 | 0 | 11 |
| 2 | 25 | GK | (Serbia) | Nikola Simić | 4 | 0 | 0 | 4 |
| 3 | 32 | GK | (Serbia) | Nemanja Toroman | 1 | 0 | 0 | 1 |
| Totals | | | | | 14 | 2 | 0 | 16 |

Last updated: 20 May 2021

=== Disciplinary record ===
| Number | Nation | Position | Name | SuperLiga | | Serbian Cup | | Europe | | Total | |
| Number | Nation | Position | Name | Booked | Sent off (straight red) | Booked | Sent off (straight red) | Booked | Sent off (straight red) | Booked | Sent off (straight red) |
| 2 | (Serbia) | DF | Marko Bjeković | 1 | 0 | 0 | 0 | 0 | 0 | 1 | 0 |
| 3 | (Serbia) | DF | Mladen Devetak | 4 | 0 | 1 | 0 | 0 | 0 | 5 | 0 |
| 4 | (Serbia) | MF | Novica Maksimović | 2 | 0 | 1 | 0 | 1 | 0 | 4 | 0 |
| 5 | (Bosnia and Herzegovina) | DF | Siniša Saničanin | 2 | 0 | 0 | 0 | 1 | 0 | 3 | 0 |
| 6 | (Serbia) | DF | Vladimir Kovačević | 4 | 0 | 0 | 0 | 0 | 0 | 4 | 0 |
| 7 | (Serbia) | FW | Nemanja Čović | 8 | 0 | 1 | 0 | 1 | 0 | 10 | 0 |
| 8 | (Serbia) | MF | Mirko Topić | 1 | 0 | 0 | 0 | 0 | 0 | 1 | 0 |
| 10 | (Serbia) | MF | Dejan Zukić | 4 | 0 | 0 | 0 | 0 | 0 | 4 | 0 |
| 11 | (Serbia) | DF | Stefan Đorđević | 2 | 0 | 0 | 0 | 1 | 0 | 3 | 0 |
| 13 | (Bosnia and Herzegovina) | GK | Goran Vukliš | 1 | 0 | 0 | 0 | 0 | 0 | 1 | 0 |
| 15 | (Serbia) | DF | Nikola Andrić | 5 | 0 | 1 | 0 | 0 | 0 | 6 | 0 |
| 18 | (Montenegro) | MF | Nikola Drinčić | 3 | 0 | 0 | 0 | 0 | 0 | 3 | 0 |
| 19 | (North Macedonia) | MF | Vladan Novevski | 1 | 0 | 0 | 0 | 0 | 0 | 1 | 0 |
| 20 | (Serbia) | DF | Đorđe Đurić | 0 | 1 | 0 | 0 | 0 | 0 | 0 | 1 |
| 22 | (Serbia) | MF | Bogdan Mladenović | 1 | 0 | 0 | 0 | 0 | 0 | 1 | 0 |
| 21 | (Serbia) | MF | Veljko Simić | 1 | 0 | 1 | 0 | 0 | 0 | 2 | 0 |
| 23 | (Bosnia and Herzegovina) | FW | Momčilo Mrkaić | 3 | 0 | 2 | 0 | 0 | 0 | 5 | 0 |
| 24 | (Serbia) | MF | Petar Bojić | 3 | 0 | 1 | 0 | 0 | 0 | 4 | 0 |
| 25 | (Serbia) | GK | Nikola Simić | 1 | 0 | 0 | 0 | 0 | 0 | 1 | 0 |
| 28 | (Serbia) | FW | Miodrag Gemović | 4 | 0 | 0 | 0 | 0 | 0 | 4 | 0 |
| 29 | (Croatia) | DF | Slavko Bralić | 7 | 0 | 2 | 0 | 0 | 0 | 9 | 0 |
| 30 | (Serbia) | DF | Aranđel Stojković | 4 | 0 | 0 | 0 | 0 | 0 | 4 | 0 |
| 80 | (Serbia) | FW | Ognjen Đuričin | 1 | 0 | 0 | 0 | 1 | 0 | 2 | 0 |
| 90 | (Serbia) | MF | Miljan Vukadinović | 3 | 0 | 0 | 0 | 1 | 0 | 4 | 0 |
| | | | TOTALS | 66 | 1 | 10 | 0 | 6 | 0 | 82 | 1 |

Last updated: 20 May 2021

=== Game as captain ===
| Rank | No. | Pos | Nat | Name | SuperLiga | Serbian Cup | Europe | Total |
|---|---|---|---|---|---|---|---|---|
| 1 | 18 | MF | (Montenegro) | Nikola Drinčić | 33 | 3 | 1 | 37 |
| 2 | 10 | MF | (Serbia) | Dejan Zukić | 4 | 1 | 0 | 5 |
| 3 | 8 | MF | (Serbia) | Mirko Topić | 1 | 0 | 0 | 1 |
| Totals | | | | | 38 | 4 | 1 | 43 |

Last updated: 20 May 2021
