= 2021–22 Serbian Cup =

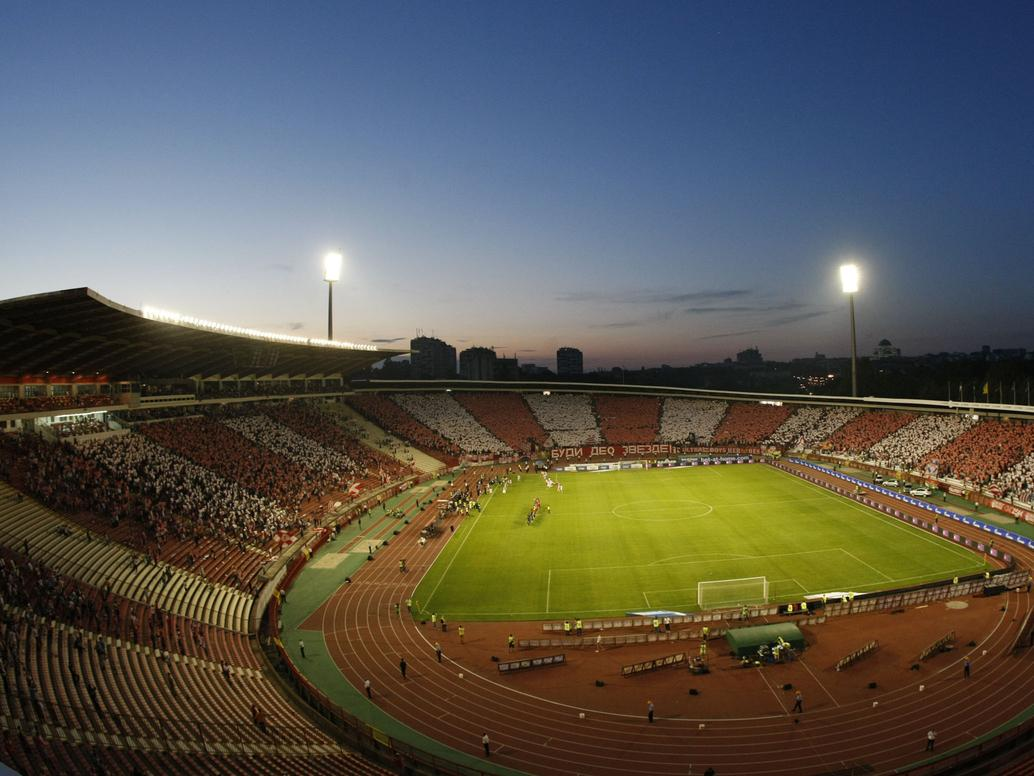
- Stadium Rajko Mitić hosted the final

Tournament details
- Country: Serbia
- Teams: 43

Final positions
- Champions: Red Star
- Runners-up: Partizan
- Semifinalists: Vojvodina; Novi Pazar

Tournament statistics
- Matches played: 42
- Goals scored: 107 (2.55 per match)
- Top goal scorer(s): Aleksa Veličković (4 goals)

The 2021–22 Serbian Cup season is the sixteenth season of the Serbian national football cup competition. It started on 8 September 2021, and ended on 26 May 2022. This season's final was a replay of the previous edition's final, with Red Star again coming out on top against Partizan.

== Calendar ==
Round	Date(s)	Number of fixtures	Clubs	New entries this round
Preliminary round	8 September 2021	11	43 → 32	22
Round of 32	27 October 2021	16	32 → 16	21
Round of 16	1 December 2021	8	16 → 8	none
Quarter-finals	6 April 2022	4	8 → 4	none
Semi-finals	11 May 2022	2	4 → 2	none
Final	26 May 2022	1	2 → 1	none

== Preliminary round ==
A preliminary round was held in order to reduce the number of teams competing in the first round to 32. It consisted of 11 single-legged ties, with a penalty shoot-out as the decider if the score was tied after 90 minutes. 22 clubs are participating in the preliminary round - five winners of the cups of territorial associations and teams that were from 2nd to 18th place in the previous season of the Serbian First League.

8 September 2021	Sloga Požega (III)	4–1	Kabel (II)	Požega, Serbia
16:00	Mijailović 31', 76'; Plazinić 62'; Vasiljević 81'	Report	Novaković 37'	Stadium: Požega City Stadium; Attendance: 200; Referee: Ljubiša Borisavljević

8 September 2021	Mokra Gora (IV)	3–3 (7–8 p)	Budućnost Dobanovci (II)	Novi Pazar, Serbia
16:00	Drobnjak 44'; Milojević 50'; Vukomanović 70'	Report	Veselinović 30'; Basrak 38'; Milić 45'	Stadium: Athletic Stadium Novi Pazar; Attendance: 30; Referee: Ivan Vučičević

8 September 2021	Borac Paraćin (IV)	0–2	Žarkovo (II)	Paraćin, Serbia
16:00		Report	Mićić 42'; Međedović 70'	Stadium: Sport Centre Borac; Attendance: 500; Referee: Nenad Đorđević

8 September 2021	Radnički Beograd (III)	3–1	Sloga Kraljevo (III)	New Belgrade, Serbia
16:00	Veličković 54', 60' (pen.); Simić 90+3'	Report	Anđelković 26'	Stadium: SC Radnički Beograd; Attendance: 200; Referee: Nikola Bikić

8 September 2021	Jedinstvo Rumenka (IV)	0–3	Loznica (II)	Rumenka, Serbia
16:00		Report	Rajevac 13'; Obadović 19'; Radmanovac 66'	Stadium: FK Jedinstvo Stadium; Attendance: 200; Referee: Miroslav Milenković

8 September 2021	Trayal (III)	1–0	Grafičar Beograd (II)	Kruševac, Serbia
16:00	Arsić 71'	Report		Stadium: Mladost Stadium (Kruševac); Attendance: 200; Referee: Stefan Đokić

8 September 2021	Železničar Pančevo (II)	3–0	Radnički Pirot (III)	Pančevo, Serbia
16:00	Ilić 40', pen.'; Marković 67'; Milošev 71'	Report		Stadium: SC Mladost; Attendance: 200; Referee: Ivan Gospavić

8 September 2021	Radnički Sremska Mitrovica (II)	0–1	Kolubara	Sremska Mitrovica, Serbia
16:00		Report	Đuranović 37'	Stadium: Radnički Stadium; Attendance: 300; Referee: Uroš Ržić

8 September 2021	Zemun (III)	0–1	Dinamo Vranje (III)	Belgrade, Serbia
16:00		Report	Ambruš 14'	Stadium: Zemun Stadium; Attendance: 200; Referee: Stefan Filipović

8 September 2021	Borac Čačak (III)	0–0 (2–4 p)	Jagodina (III)	Čačak, Serbia
16:00		Report		Stadium: Čačak Stadium; Attendance: 300; Referee: Miroslav Miletić

8 September 2021	Dubočica (III)	1–0	IMT (II)	Mrštane, Serbia
16:00	Savić 34'	Report		Stadium: Orion Stadium; Attendance: 500; Referee: Saša Ranisavljević

== Round of 32 ==
Draw for the first round took place on 28 September 2021. Matches were played on 27 October 2021. It consisted of 16 single-legged ties, with a penalty shoot-out as the decider if the score was tied after 90 minutes.

13 October 2021	Radnik Surdulica	2–0	Radnički Kragujevac	Surdulica, Serbia
14:00	Medić 22'; Spasić 45+1'	Report		Stadium: Surdulica City Stadium; Attendance: 300; Referee: Miloš Milanović

13 October 2021	Partizan	3–0	Trayal (III)	Belgrade, Serbia
16:30	Menig 25', 49'; Živković 67'	Report		Stadium: Partizan Stadium; Attendance: 500; Referee: Miroslav Miletić

14 October 2021	Metalac Gornji Milanovac	3–2	Žarkovo (II)	Gornji Milanovac, Serbia
17:00	Furtula 9'; Krajišnik 16'; Nikolić 72'	Report	Čarapić 22'; Kokir 81'	Stadium: Stadion Metalac; Attendance: 350; Referee: Milan Ilić

27 October 2021	Loznica (II)	1–0	Čukarički	Klupci, Serbia
14:30	Milinković 31'	Report		Stadium: FK Radnički Stadium; Attendance: 800; Referee: David Matić

27 October 2021	Železničar Pančevo (II)	0–1	Napredak	Pančevo, Serbia
14:30		Report	Bačanin 11'	Stadium: SC Mladost; Attendance: 200; Referee: Miloš Milanović

27 October 2021	Vojvodina	5–1	Jagodina (III)	Novi Sad, Serbia
16:00	Bastajić 24'; Simić 32'; Đorđević 50' (o.g.); Čović 52'; Zukić 87'	Report	Stojanović 10'	Stadium: Karađorđe Stadium; Attendance: 550; Referee: Miroslav Matić

27 October 2021	Radnički Niš	1–0	Dinamo Vranje (III)	Niš, Serbia
14:30	Stevanović 90+5'	Report		Stadium: Čair Stadium; Attendance: 500; Referee: Stefan Jeknić

27 October 2021	OFK Bačka (II)	1–1 (3–2 p)	Proleter	Bačka Palanka, Serbia
14:30	Bogdanović 68'	Report	Vještica 35' (o.g.)	Stadium: Slavko Maletin Vava Stadium; Attendance: 150; Referee: Nikola Đorđević

27 October 2021	Mladost Lučani	2–3	Kolubara	Lučani, Serbia
17:00	Milošević 48'; Danoski 90+3'	Report	Filipović 29'; Nikolić 50'; Andrić 82'	Stadium: Mladost Stadium (Lučani); Attendance: 100; Referee: Marko Srećković

27 October 2021	Novi Pazar	1–0	Budućnost Dobanovci (II)	Novi Pazar, Serbia
14:00	Dimić 81'	Report		Stadium: Novi Pazar City Stadium; Attendance: 800; Referee: Mladen Jakovljević

27 October 2021	Sloga Požega (III)	0–1	Rad (II)	Požega, Serbia
14:00		Report	Gojković 29' (pen.)	Stadium: Požega City Stadium; Attendance: 200; Referee: Nikola Petrović

27 October 2021	Javor (II)	2–1	Mačva (II)	Ivanjica, Serbia
15:00	Momčilović 4' (pen.), 44'	Report	Trimanović 23'	Stadium: Ivanjica Stadium; Attendance: 200; Referee: Aleksandar Živković

27 October 2021	Zlatibor (II)	0–4	TSC	Čajetina, Serbia
14:30		Report	Milićević 22'; Petković 23'; Bocskay 61'; Stoiljković 81'	Stadium: Švajcarija Stadium; Attendance: 200; Referee: Dejan Trifković

27 October 2021	Spartak	1–1 (4–5 p)	Dubočica (III)	Subotica, Serbia
16:00	Marčić 40'	Report	Mitrović 19'	Stadium: Subotica City Stadium; Attendance: 350; Referee: Ljubiša Borisavljević

27 October 2021	Radnički Beograd (III)	2–1	Voždovac	New Belgrade, Serbia
14:30	Veličković 1', 13'	Report	Pantović 77'	Stadium: SC Radnički Beograd; Attendance: 400; Referee: Ivan Gospavić

18 November 2021	Inđija (II)	0–1	Red Star	Inđija, Serbia
13:00		Report	Živković 24'	Stadium: Inđija Stadium; Attendance: 1,500; Referee: Marko Ivković

== Round of 16 ==
The 16 winners from first round took part in this stage of the competition. Draw for the round of 16 took place on 19 November 2021. Matches were played on 1 December 2021. It consisted of 8 single-legged ties, with a penalty shoot-out as the decider if the score was tied after 90 minutes.

30 November 2021	Radnički Beograd (III)	1–1 (2–3 p)	Metalac Gornji Milanovac	New Belgrade, Serbia
13:00	Nuredini 47'	Report	Stuparević 16'	Stadium: SC Radnički Beograd; Attendance: 200; Referee: Miloš Milanović

1 December 2021	Rad (II)	1–0	Napredak	Belgrade, Serbia
13:00	Đorić 19'	Report		Stadium: King Peter I Stadium; Attendance: 150; Referee: Danilo Nikolić

1 December 2021	Radnik Surdulica	1–2	Loznica (II)	Surdulica, Serbia
13:00	Milovanović 90+1' (pen.)	Report	Rajevac 79'; Komarčević 88'	Stadium: Surdulica City Stadium; Attendance: 250; Referee: Nikola Radaković

1 December 2021	TSC	2–1	Kolubara	Bačka Topola, Serbia
13:00	Vukić 23', 66'	Report	Đuranović 73'	Stadium: TSC Arena; Attendance: 500; Referee: Marko Srećković

1 December 2021	Dubočica (III)	0–1	Partizan	Niš, Serbia
16:15		Report	Milovanović 39'	Stadium: Čair Stadium; Attendance: 3,000; Referee: Stanko Ostraćanin

2 December 2021	Novi Pazar	2–0	OFK Bačka (II)	Novi Pazar, Serbia
13:00	Ratković 24' (pen.); Islamović 77'	Report		Stadium: Novi Pazar City Stadium; Attendance: 500; Referee: Dejan Trifković

2 December 2021	Javor (II)	1–1 (1–4 p)	Vojvodina	Ivanjica, Serbia
15:00	Odita 59'	Report	Vukadinović 82'	Stadium: Ivanjica Stadium; Attendance: 500; Referee: Milan Mitić

16 February 2022	Red Star	0–0 (3–2 p)	Radnički Niš	Belgrade, Serbia
17:00		Report		Stadium: Red Star Stadium; Attendance: 5,000; Referee: Marko Srećković

== Quarter-finals ==
The 8 winners from the previous round will take part in this stage of the competition. Draw for the Quarter-finals took place on 1 March 2022. Matches were played on 6 April 2022. It consisted of 4 single-legged ties, with a penalty shoot-out as the decider if the score was tied after 90 minutes.

6 April 2022	Novi Pazar	1–0	Metalac Gornji Milanovac	Novi Pazar, Serbia
16:00	Čečarić 21'	Report		Stadium: Novi Pazar City Stadium; Attendance: 1,000; Referee: Momčilo Marković

6 April 2022	Partizan	2–0	Loznica (II)	Belgrade, Serbia
17:00	Gomes 33'; Marković 45+1'	Report		Stadium: Partizan Stadium; Attendance: 1,000; Referee: Nenad Minaković

6 April 2022	Rad (II)	0–4	Vojvodina	Belgrade, Serbia
18:30		Report	Vukčević 10'; Simić 17' (pen.); Topić 24'; Zukić 45+1' (pen.)	Stadium: King Peter I Stadium; Attendance: 600; Referee: Aleksandar Živković

6 April 2022	Red Star	4–0	TSC	Belgrade, Serbia
18:30	Katai 6' (pen.); Ben 56' (pen.), 80'; Ivanić 74'	Report		Stadium: Red Star Stadium; Attendance: 1,400; Referee: Lazar Lukić

== Semi-finals ==
The 4 winners from the Quarter-finals will take part in this stage of the competition. Draw for the Semi-finals took place on 19 April 2022. Matches were played on 11 May 2022. It consisted of 2 single-legged ties, with a penalty shoot-out as the decider if the score was tied after 90 minutes.

11 May 2022	Partizan	2–1	Vojvodina	Belgrade, Serbia
16:30	Ricardo 4'; Menig 43'	Report	Zukić 52'	Stadium: Partizan Stadium; Attendance: 5,000; Referee: Stanko Ostraćanin

11 May 2022	Red Star	8–0	Novi Pazar	Belgrade, Serbia
18:30	Ben 6'; Omoijuanfo 12' (pen.), 20'; Pavkov 15'; Ivanić 23'; Stanković 58' (pen.), 89'; Stanić 81'	Report		Stadium: Red Star Stadium; Attendance: 3,500; Referee: Miloš Milanović

== Final ==
26 May 2022	Red Star	2–1	Partizan	Belgrade, Serbia
16:30	Katai 26', 73'	Report	Urošević 62'	Stadium: Red Star Stadium; Attendance: 26,000; Referee: Miloš Milanović

== Top scorers ==
As of matches played on 26 May 2022.

Rank	Player	Club	Goals
1	(Serbia) Aleksa Veličković	Radnički Beograd	4
2	(Comoros) El Fardou Ben	Red Star	3
2	(Serbia) Aleksandar Katai	Red Star	3
2	(Netherlands) Queensy Menig	Partizan	3
2	(Serbia) Dejan Zukić	Vojvodina	3
