= Bjeković =

Bjeković (Serbian: Бјековић) is a Serbian surname that may refer to:

- Marko Bjeković (born 2000), Serbian footballer
- Nenad Bjeković (born 1947), former Yugoslav and Serbian football player, and manager
- Nenad Bjeković Jr. (born 1974), former Serbian footballer

== See also ==
- Bjegovići, a settlement
