= Siniša Saničanin =

Bosnian footballer (born 1995)

Personal information
- Date of birth: 24 April 1995 (age 31)
- Place of birth: Prijedor, Bosnia and Herzegovina
- Height: 1.90 m (6 ft 3 in)
- Position: Centre-back

Team information
- Current team: Borac Banja Luka
- Number: 6

Youth career
- Rudar Prijedor

Senior career*
Years	Team	Apps	(Gls)
2013–2015	Rudar Prijedor	24	(1)
2015–2016	Borac Banja Luka	18	(1)
2016–2017	Mladost Lučani	39	(2)
2017–2021	Vojvodina	97	(3)
2021–2024	Partizan	52	(1)
2024–2025	Diósgyőr	29	(1)
2025–	Borac Banja Luka	31	(0)

International career
2013	Bosnia and Herzegovina U19	1	(0)
2015–2016	Bosnia and Herzegovina U21	8	(1)
2020–2023	Bosnia and Herzegovina	23	(0)
- * Club domestic league appearances and goals as of 10 October 2026

Siniša Saničanin (pronounced [sǐniʃa sanîːtʃanin]; born 24 April 1995) is a Bosnian professional footballer who plays as a centre-back for Bosnian Premier League club Borac Banja Luka.

Saničanin started his professional career at Rudar Prijedor, before joining Borac Banja Luka in 2015. The following year, he moved to Mladost Lučani. A year later, he signed with Vojvodina. Saničanin switched to Partizan in 2021. Three years later, he joined Diósgyőr. He came back to Borac Banja Luka in 2025.

A former youth international for Bosnia and Herzegovina, Saničanin made his senior international debut in 2020, earning over 20 caps until 2023.

== Club career ==
=== Early career ===
Saničanin came through the youth setup of his hometown club Rudar Prijedor. He made his professional debut against Olimpic on 14 September 2013 at the age of 18. On 8 November 2014, he scored his first professional goal in a triumph over Proleter Teslić.

In the summer of 2015, Saničanin joined Borac Banja Luka.

In January 2016, he signed with Serbian side Mladost Lučani.

In August 2017, he switched to Vojvodina.

=== Partizan ===
In June 2021, Saničanin moved to Partizan on a three-year deal. He made his official debut for the team on 17 July against Proleter Novi Sad. On 26 August, he scored his first goal for Partizan in the UEFA Conference League play-offs against Santa Clara. Fourteen months later, he scored his first league goal in a defeat of TSC.

=== Later stage of career ===
In July 2024, Saničanin joined Hungarian outfit Diósgyőr.

In September 2025, he returned to Borac Banja Luka.

== International career ==
Saničanin represented Bosnia and Herzegovina at various youth levels.

In March 2020, he received his first senior call up, for the UEFA Euro 2020 qualifying play-offs against Northern Ireland, but had to wait until 4 September to make his debut in a 2020–21 UEFA Nations League A game against Italy.

== Personal life ==
Saničanin married his long-time girlfriend Teodora in January 2021. Together they have a son named Strahinja.

== Career statistics ==
=== Club ===
As of match played 5 November 2026

Appearances and goals by club, season and competition
Club	Season	League			National cup (Note: Includes Bosnian Cup, Serbian Cup, Magyar Kupa)		Continental		Total	
Club	Season	Division	Apps	Goals	Apps	Goals	Apps	Goals	Apps	Goals
Rudar Prijedor	2013–14	Bosnian Premier League	2	0	0	0	–		2	0
Rudar Prijedor	2014–15	First League of the RS	22	1	3	0	–		25	1
Rudar Prijedor	Total		24	1	3	0	–		27	1
Borac Banja Luka	2015–16	Bosnian Premier League	18	1	2	0	–		20	1
Mladost Lučani	2015–16	Serbian SuperLiga	14	1	–		–		14	1
Mladost Lučani	2016–17	Serbian SuperLiga	24	1	2	0	–		26	1
Mladost Lučani	2017–18	Serbian SuperLiga	1	0	0	0	0	0	1	0
Mladost Lučani	Total		39	2	2	0	0	0	41	2
Vojvodina	2017–18	Serbian SuperLiga	21	0	3	0	–		24	0
Vojvodina	2018–19	Serbian SuperLiga	28	0	3	0	–		31	0
Vojvodina	2019–20	Serbian SuperLiga	28	0	4	0	–		32	0
Vojvodina	2020–21	Serbian SuperLiga	20	3	2	0	1 (Note: Appearance in UEFA Europa League)	0	23	3
Vojvodina	Total		97	3	12	0	1	0	110	3
Partizan	2021–22	Serbian SuperLiga	27	0	1	0	14 (Note: Appearances in UEFA Conference League)	1	42	1
Partizan	2022–23	Serbian SuperLiga	17	1	0	0	6 (Note: One appearance in UEFA Europa League; five appearances in UEFA Conference League)	0	23	1
Partizan	2023–24	Serbian SuperLiga	8	0	2	0	0	0	10	0
Partizan	Total		52	1	3	0	20	1	75	2
Diósgyőr	2024–25	Nemzeti Bajnokság I	28	1	2	1	–		30	2
Diósgyőr	2025–26	Nemzeti Bajnokság I	1	0	0	0	–		1	0
Diósgyőr	Total		29	1	2	1	–		31	2
Borac Banja Luka	2025–26	Bosnian Premier League	22	0	0	0	–		22	0
Borac Banja Luka	2026–27	Bosnian Premier League	9	0	1	0	7 (Note: Two appearances in UEFA Champions League; five appearances in UEFA Conference League)	0	17	0
Borac Banja Luka	Total		31	0	1	0	7	0	39	0
Career total			290	9	25	1	28	1	343	11

=== International ===
Appearances and goals by national team and year
National team	Year	Apps	Goals
Bosnia and Herzegovina
Bosnia and Herzegovina	2020	8	0
Bosnia and Herzegovina	2021	6	0
Bosnia and Herzegovina	2022	5	0
Bosnia and Herzegovina	2023	4	0
Total		23	0

== Honours ==
Rudar Prijedor

- First League of the RS: 2014–15

Vojvodina

- Serbian Cup: 2019–20

Borac Banja Luka

- Bosnian Premier League: 2025–26
