= Nemanja Toroman =

Serbian footballer

Personal information
- Full name: Nemanja Toroman
- Date of birth: 26 December 2000 (age 25)
- Place of birth: Novi Sad, FR Yugoslavia
- Height: 1.91 m (6 ft 3 in)
- Position: Goalkeeper

Team information
- Current team: Vojvodina

Youth career
- Vojvodina

Senior career*
Years	Team	Apps	(Gls)
2019–	Vojvodina	2	(0)
2022	→ OFK Bačka (loan)	5	(0)
2022–2023	→ Kabel (loan)	25	(0)
2024	→ Radnički SM (loan)	4	(0)
2024	→ Inđija (loan)	0	(0)
2025–2026	→ Kabel (loan)	41	(0)
- * Club domestic league appearances and goals as of 22 March 2026

Nemanja Toroman (Serbian Cyrillic: Немања Тороман; born 26 December 2000) is a Serbian professional footballer who plays as a goalkeeper for Serbian SuperLiga club Vojvodina.

== Club career ==
=== Vojvodina ===
On 30 October 2020, Toroman made his first team debut, replacing Goran Vukliš in the 80th minute of a 3–1 home win over OFK Bačka.

== Career statistics ==
As of 22 March 2026

Club	Season	League			Cup		Continental		Total	
Club	Season	Division	Apps	Goals	Apps	Goals	Apps	Goals	Apps	Goals
Vojvodina	2018–19	Serbian SuperLiga	0	0	0	0	—		0	0
Vojvodina	2019–20	Serbian SuperLiga	0	0	0	0	—		0	0
Vojvodina	2020–21	Serbian SuperLiga	2	0	0	0	0	0	2	0
Vojvodina	2021–22	Serbian SuperLiga	0	0	0	0	0	0	0	0
Vojvodina	2023–24	Serbian SuperLiga	0	0	2	0	0	0	2	0
Vojvodina	Total		2	0	2	0	0	0	4	0
OFK Bačka (loan)	2021–22	Serbian First League	5	0	0	0	—		5	0
Kabel (loan)	2022–23	Serbian League Vojvodina	25	0	2	0	—		27	0
Radnički SM (loan)	2023–24	Serbian First League	4	0	—		—		4	0
Inđija (loan)	2024–25	Serbian First League	0	0	1	0	—		1	0
Kabel (loan)	2024–25	Serbian League Vojvodina	13	0	—		—		13	0
Kabel (loan)	2025–26	Serbian First League	28	0	—		—		28	0
Kabel (loan)	Total		41	0	—		—		41	0
Career total			77	0	5	0	0	0	82	0

== Honours ==
Vojvodina

- Serbian Cup: 2019–20
