= Petar Pavlićević =

Montenegrin footballer

Personal information
- Date of birth: 10 May 2000 (age 26)
- Place of birth: Montenegro, FR Yugoslavia
- Height: 1.77 m (5 ft 10 in)
- Position: Attacking midfielder

Team information
- Current team: Dečić
- Number: 74

Youth career
- Titograd
- 2018–2020: Benfica

Senior career*
Years	Team	Apps	(Gls)
2020–2021	Vojvodina	0	(0)
2020–2021	→ Kabel (loan)	19	(1)
2021–2023	Iskra Danilovgrad	45	(4)
2023–2025	Jezero	64	(3)
2025–	Dečić	24	(0)

International career
2016–2017	Montenegro U17	13	(0)
2017	Montenegro U18	2	(0)
2018	Montenegro U19	13	(2)
- * Club domestic league appearances and goals as of 17 June 2026

Petar Pavlićević (Serbian Cyrillic: Петар Павлићевић; born 10 May 2000) is a Montenegrin professional footballer who plays as an attacking midfielder for Montenegrin First League club Dečić.

== International career ==
Pavlićević was called in Montenegro U17, Montenegro U18 and Montenegro U19 national team squads.
