= Vukašin Bogdanović =

Serbian footballer

Personal information
- Date of birth: 4 October 2002 (age 24)
- Place of birth: Prokuplje, FR Yugoslavia (now Serbia)
- Height: 1.84 m (6 ft 0 in)
- Position: Forward

Team information
- Current team: Radnik Surdulica
- Number: 9

Youth career
- Real Niš
- 2019–2021: Vojvodina

Senior career*
Years	Team	Apps	(Gls)
2020–2022	Vojvodina	1	(0)
2021	→ Kabel (loan)	13	(1)
2021–2022	→ Bačka (loan)	32	(3)
2022–	Radnik Surdulica	110	(20)

International career
2018	Serbia U17	2	(0)
2019	Serbia U18	4	(2)
2021	Serbia U19	2	(0)
- * Club domestic league appearances and goals as of 12 June 2026

Vukašin Bogdanović (Serbian Cyrillic: Вукашин Богдановић; born 4 October 2002) is a Serbian professional footballer who plays as a forward for Serbian First League club Radnik Surdulica.

== Honours ==
Vojvodina

- Serbian Cup: 2019–20
