= Dejan Zukić =

Serbian footballer (born 2001)

Personal information
- Date of birth: 7 May 2001 (age 25)
- Place of birth: Bački Jarak, FR Yugoslavia
- Height: 1.81 m (5 ft 11 1/2 in)
- Position: Attacking midfielder

Team information
- Current team: Vojvodina
- Number: 10

Youth career
- Vojvodina

Senior career*
Years	Team	Apps	(Gls)
2017–2024	Vojvodina	170	(23)
2024–2026	Wolfsberger AC	62	(17)
2026–	Vojvodina	15	(9)

International career^{‡}
2017	Serbia U16	6	(2)
2017–2018	Serbia U17	3	(0)
2018	Serbia U18	3	(0)
2019–2020	Serbia U19	5	(1)
2021	Serbia U21	4	(0)
2025–	Serbia	3	(0)
- * Club domestic league appearances and goals as of 22 November 2026 ‡ National team caps and goals as of 12 October 2025

Dejan Zukić (Serbian: Дејан Зукић, born 7 May 2001) is a Serbian footballer who plays as an attacking midfielder for Vojvodina, which he captains, and the Serbia national team.

== Club career ==
=== Vojvodina ===
A native of Bački Jarak, Zukić came through the Vojvodina youth academy. At the tournament Max Sport Cup in 2014, Zukić promoted himself as the best scorer in his generation.

Zukić was promoted to the first team in summer 2017 at the age of 16, becoming its youngest member and signing a scholarship contract until summer 2019 previously. He was among the 13 players born in 2001 which were registered for the 2017–18 Serbian SuperLiga season. Zukić was an unused substitution in a match against OFK Bačka in August 2016.

On 19 March 2019, Zukić signed his first, three-year professional with Vojvodina. Eleven days later, Zukić made his first team debut in a 3–1 away victory against Dinamo Vranje, replacing Damjan Gojkov in 88th minute and drawing a penalty kick one minute later. On 7 August 2023, Zukić extended his contract with Vojvodina until June 2026.

=== Wolfsberger AC ===
Zukić signed a three-year contract for Austrian club Wolfsberger AC on 9 July 2024, keeping him there until 2027.

== International career ==
Zukić has been a member of the Serbia national football team since the age of 14. He was also called in Serbian under-15 team squad in 2015. Zukić made under-16 debut in a match against Belarus on 2 April 2017. Playing for the team, Zukić made 6 appearances and scored two goals, in matches against Bulgaria and Estonia.

On 11 October 2025, Zukić debuted for the Serbian senior team in a 2026 FIFA World Cup qualification against Albania.

== Career statistics ==
=== Club ===
As of 22 November 2026

Club	Season	League			National cup (Note: Includes Serbian Cup, Austrian Cup)		Europe		Other		Total	
Club	Season	Division	Apps	Goals	Apps	Goals	Apps	Goals	Apps	Goals	Apps	Goals
Vojvodina	2017–18	SuperLiga	0	0	0	0	—		—		0	0
Vojvodina	2018–19	SuperLiga	10	1	0	0	—		—		10	1
Vojvodina	2019–20	SuperLiga	27	4	4	2	—		—		31	6
Vojvodina	2020–21	SuperLiga	36	4	3	1	1 (Note: Appearance in UEFA Europa League)	0	—		40	5
Vojvodina	2021–22	SuperLiga	28	3	4	3	4 (Note: Appearances in UEFA Europa Conference League)	0	—		36	6
Vojvodina	2022–23	SuperLiga	32	3	4	0	—		—		36	3
Vojvodina	2023–24	SuperLiga	37	8	5	2	2	2	—		44	12
Vojvodina	Total		170	23	20	8	7	2	—		197	33
Wolfsberg	2024–25	Austrian Bundesliga	31	10	5	2	—		—		36	12
Wolfsberg	2025–26	Austrian Bundesliga	31	7	3	2	4	1	1	0	39	10
Wolfsberg	Total		62	17	8	4	4	1	1	0	75	22
Vojvodina	2026–27	SuperLiga	15	9	1	0	4	0	—		20	9
Career total			247	49	29	12	15	3	1	0	292	64

=== International ===
As of match played 14 October 2025

Appearances and goals by national team and year
National team	Year	Apps	Goals
Serbia	2025	1	0
Serbia	2026	2	0
Total		3	0

== Honours ==
Vojvodina

- Serbian Cup: 2019–20

Wolfsberg

- Austrian Cup: 2024–25

Individual

- Serbian SuperLiga Player of the Week: 2022–23 (Round 24)
