= Vladan Novevski =

Serbian footballer

Personal information
- Full name: Vladan Novevski
- Date of birth: 13 May 2002 (age 24)
- Place of birth: Novi Sad, Serbia, FR Yugoslavia
- Height: 1.83 m (6 ft 0 in)
- Positions: Winger; right-back

Team information
- Current team: Vojvodina
- Number: 13

Youth career
- Vojvodina

Senior career*
Years	Team	Apps	(Gls)
2020–2022	Vojvodina	24	(0)
2023–2024	Voždovac	19	(0)
2025	Kabel	15	(4)
2025–	Vojvodina	2	(0)
2025	→ Kabel (loan)	16	(0)

International career^{‡}
2017–2018	North Macedonia U17	8	(2)
2019	North Macedonia U18	2	(0)
2019–2020	North Macedonia U19	2	(0)
2021	Serbia U20	1	(0)
- * Club domestic league appearances and goals as of 23 May 2026 ‡ National team caps and goals as of 26 February 2022

Vladan "Vlada" Novevski (Serbian Cyrillic: Владан "Влада" Новевски; born 13 May 2002) is a Serbian professional footballer who plays as a winger for Serbian SuperLiga club Vojvodina.

== International career ==
Novevski's first international experience came at youth level with the North Macedonia under-16, under-17, under-18 and under-19 national teams, but he decided to accept the call-up by Football Association of Serbia. On 6 September 2021, he was named as a member of the Serbia under-20 squad, and debuted a few days later against Italy under-20.

== Career statistics ==
As of 23 May 2026

Club	Season	League			Cup		Continental		Total	
Club	Season	Division	Apps	Goals	Apps	Goals	Apps	Goals	Apps	Goals
Vojvodina	2020–21	Serbian SuperLiga	12	0	0	0	—		12	0
Vojvodina	2021–22	Serbian SuperLiga	12	0	2	0	4	0	18	0
Vojvodina	Total		24	0	2	0	4	0	30	0
Voždovac	2022–23	Serbian SuperLiga	8	0	0	0	—		8	0
Voždovac	2023–24	Serbian SuperLiga	11	0	1	0	—		12	0
Voždovac	Total		19	0	1	0	—		20	0
Kabel	2024–25	Serbian League Vojvodina	15	4	—		—		15	4
Kabel	2025–26 (loan)	Serbian First League	16	0	—		—		16	0
Kabel	Total		31	4	—		—		31	4
Vojvodina	2025–26	Serbian SuperLiga	2	0	0	0	—		2	0
Career total			63	4	3	0	4	0	70	4
