= Stefan Đorđević (footballer, born 1991) =

Serbian footballer

Personal information
- Full name: Stefan Đorđević
- Date of birth: 13 March 1991 (age 35)
- Place of birth: Novi Sad, SR Serbia, SFR Yugoslavia
- Height: 1.86 m (6 ft 1 in)
- Position: Left-back

Youth career
- Vojvodina

Senior career*
Years	Team	Apps	(Gls)
2010–2011	Proleter Novi Sad	23	(0)
2012	Spartak Subotica	7	(0)
2013	Banat Zrenjanin	12	(0)
2013–2014	Voždovac	13	(0)
2014–2015	Red Star Belgrade	3	(0)
2015–2016	Borac Čačak	1	(0)
2016–2018	Catania	41	(1)
2018–2020	Radnički Niš	33	(1)
2020–2025	Vojvodina	103	(1)
- * Club domestic league appearances and goals as of 2 March 2025

Stefan Đorđević (Serbian Cyrillic: Стефан Ђорђевић; born 13 March 1991) is a Serbian professional footballer who last played as a defender for Vojvodina.

== Career statistics ==
As of 2 April 2025

Appearances and goals by club, season and competition
Club	Season	League			Cup		Continental		Total	
Club	Season	Division	Apps	Goals	Apps	Goals	Apps	Goals	Apps	Goals
Proleter Novi Sad	2010–11	Serbian First League	18	0	1	0	–		19	0
Proleter Novi Sad	2011–12	Serbian First League	5	0	1	0	–		6	0
Proleter Novi Sad	Total		23	0	2	0	–		25	0
Spartak Subotica	2011–12	Serbian SuperLiga	7	0	0	0	–		7	0
Spartak Subotica	2012–13	Serbian SuperLiga	0	0	0	0	–		0	0
Spartak Subotica	Total		7	0	0	0	–		7	0
Banat Zrenjanin	2012–13	Serbian First League	12	0	–		–		12	0
Voždovac	2013–14	Serbian SuperLiga	13	0	1	0	–		14	0
Red Star Belgrade	2014–15	Serbian SuperLiga	3	0	0	0	0	0	3	0
Borac Čačak	2015–16	Serbian SuperLiga	1	0	1	0	–		2	0
Catania	2016–17	Serie C	32	0	2	0	–		34	0
Catania	2017–18	Serie C	9	1	1	0	–		10	1
Catania	Total		41	1	3	0	–		44	1
Radnički Niš	2018–19	Serbian SuperLiga	18	1	5	0	–		23	1
Radnički Niš	2019–20	Serbian SuperLiga	15	0	0	0	2	0	17	0
Radnički Niš	Total		33	1	5	0	2	0	40	1
Vojvodina	2019–20	Serbian SuperLiga	7	0	3	0	–		10	0
Vojvodina	2020–21	Serbian SuperLiga	33	1	4	0	1	0	38	1
Vojvodina	2021–22	Serbian SuperLiga	16	0	3	0	0	0	19	0
Vojvodina	2022–23	Serbian SuperLiga	24	0	0	0	–		24	0
Vojvodina	2023–24	Serbian SuperLiga	16	0	2	0	–		18	0
Vojvodina	2024–25	Serbian SuperLiga	7	0	3	0	2	0	12	0
Vojvodina	Total		103	1	15	0	3	0	121	1
Career total			236	3	27	0	5	0	268	3

== Honours ==
Vojvodina

- Serbian Cup: 2019–20
