= Bogdan Mladenović =

Serbian footballer

Personal information
- Date of birth: 4 April 1996 (age 30)
- Place of birth: Belgrade, FR Yugoslavia
- Height: 1.80 m (5 ft 11 in)
- Position: Winger

Team information
- Current team: Dubočica
- Number: 33

Youth career
- Rad

Senior career*
Years	Team	Apps	(Gls)
2015–2019	Rad	111	(10)
2015	→ Žarkovo (loan)	4	(0)
2019–2020	Gil Vicente	0	(0)
2020–2021	Vojvodina	18	(1)
2021	→ Al-Diwaniya (loan)	11	(0)
2021–2022	Kolubara	29	(4)
2022–2023	Balzan	15	(0)
2023	Wuxi Wugo	14	(5)
2024–2025	Ilioupolis	5	(0)
2025–	Dubočica	22	(2)

International career
2016	Serbia U20	1	(0)
2016	Serbia	1	(0)
- * Club domestic league appearances and goals as of 14 May 2026

Bogdan Mladenović (Serbian Cyrillic: Богдан Младеновић; born 4 April 1996) is a Serbian professional footballer who plays as a winger for Dubočica.

== Club career ==
A product of the Rad youth system, Mladenović was promoted to the first-team squad in the second part of the 2014–15 Serbian SuperLiga, making 11 appearances and scoring one goal.

On 5 August 2019, it was confirmed, that Mladenović had joined Portuguese Primeira Liga club Gil Vicente.

On 22 January 2020, Mladenović signed for Serbian SuperLiga club Vojvodina.

On 30 June 2021, Mladenović signed for another Serbian SuperLiga club Kolubara.

On 12 July 2023, Mladenović signed with China League One club Wuxi Wugo.

== International career ==
Mladenović made his international debut for Serbia in a friendly against Qatar in September 2016.

== Career statistics ==
As of match played 27 October 2024

Appearances and goals by club, season and competition
Club	Season	League			Cup		Continental		Total	
Club	Season	Division	Apps	Goals	Apps	Goals	Apps	Goals	Apps	Goals
Rad	2014–15	Serbian SuperLiga	11	1	0	0	—		11	1
Rad	2015–16	Serbian SuperLiga	17	0	1	0	—		18	0
Rad	2016–17	Serbian SuperLiga	28	5	2	0	—		30	5
Rad	2017–18	Serbian SuperLiga	27	2	2	0	—		29	2
Rad	2018–19	Serbian SuperLiga	27	2	1	0	—		28	2
Rad	2019–20	Serbian SuperLiga	1	0	—		—		1	0
Rad	Total		111	10	6	0	—		117	10
Gil Vicente	2019–20	Primeira Liga	0	0	—		—		0	0
Vojvodina	2019–20	Serbian SuperLiga	5	0	0	0	—		5	0
Vojvodina	2020–21	Serbian SuperLiga	13	1	2	0	0	0	15	1
Vojvodina	Total		18	1	2	0	0	0	20	1
Al-Diwaniya (loan)	2020–21	Iraqi Premier League	11	0	—		—		11	0
Kolubara	2021–22	Serbian SuperLiga	29	4	3	0	—		32	4
Kolubara	2022–23	Serbian SuperLiga	1	0	—		—		1	0
Kolubara	Total		30	4	3	0	—		33	4
Balzan	2022–23	Maltese Premier League	15	0	2	1	—		17	1
Wuxi Wugo	2023	China League One	14	5	—		—		14	5
Ilioupolis	2024–25	Super League Greece 2	5	0	1	0	—		6	0
Career total			204	20	14	1	0	0	218	21

== Honours ==
Vojvodina

- Serbian Cup: 2019–20
