= Marko Bjeković =

Serbian footballer

Personal information
- Full name: Marko Bjeković
- Date of birth: 21 September 2000 (age 26)
- Place of birth: Novi Sad, FR Yugoslavia
- Height: 1.82 m (5 ft 11 1/2 in)
- Position: Right-back

Team information
- Current team: Javor Ivanjica
- Number: 13

Youth career
- Vojvodina

Senior career*
Years	Team	Apps	(Gls)
2019–2024	Vojvodina	62	(0)
2019–2020	→ Kabel (loan)	26	(1)
2025–	Javor Ivanjica	43	(1)

International career^{‡}
2016	Serbia U17	1	(0)
2018	Bosnia and Herzegovina U18	3	(0)
2019	Serbia U19	0	(0)
2021–2022	Serbia U21	6	(0)
- * Club domestic league appearances and goals as of 13 June 2026 ‡ National team caps and goals as of 2 June 2022

Marko Bjeković (Serbian Cyrillic: Марко Бјековић; born 21 September 2000) is a Serbian footballer playing for Javor Ivanjica.

== Club career ==
=== Vojvodina ===
On 19 May 2019, Bjeković made his first team debut, replacing another debutante Andrej Jakovljević in 82nd minute of 1:1 away draw with Čukarički.

=== Javor Ivanjica ===
On 16 January 2025, after 6 months without a club, Bjeković signed a 2 1/2-year deal with Serbian First League club Javor Ivanjica.

== Career statistics ==
=== Club ===
As of 25 May 2024

Club	Season	League			Cup		Continental		Total	
Club	Season	Division	Apps	Goals	Apps	Goals	Apps	Goals	Apps	Goals
Vojvodina	2018–19	Serbian SuperLiga	1	0	0	0	—		1	0
Vojvodina	2020–21	Serbian SuperLiga	12	0	3	0	—		15	0
Vojvodina	2021–22	Serbian SuperLiga	14	0	2	0	0	0	16	0
Vojvodina	2022–23	Serbian SuperLiga	19	0	0	0	—		19	0
Vojvodina	2023–24	Serbian SuperLiga	16	0	0	0	1	0	17	0
Vojvodina	Total		62	0	5	0	1	0	68	0
Kabel (loan)	2019–20	Serbian First League	26	1	0	0	—		26	1
Javor Ivanjica	2024–25	Serbian First League	0	0	—		—		0	0
Career total			88	1	5	0	1	0	94	1
