= Nemanja Čović =

Serbian footballer

Personal information
- Full name: Nemanja Čović
- Date of birth: 18 June 1991 (age 35)
- Place of birth: Novi Sad, SR Serbia, SFR Yugoslavia
- Height: 1.85 m (6 ft 1 in)
- Position: Forward

Team information
- Current team: Suzhou Dongwu

Youth career
- Cement Beočin
- Vojvodina

Senior career*
Years	Team	Apps	(Gls)
2007–2008	Cement Beočin	19	(5)
2008–2010	Proleter Novi Sad	35	(11)
2010–2011	Parma	0	(0)
2011	Vojvodina	1	(0)
2011–2013	Spartak Subotica	32	(3)
2013	Donji Srem	6	(0)
2014	Spartak Semey	9	(3)
2014	Proleter Novi Sad	11	(4)
2015	Shakhtyor Soligorsk	15	(3)
2016	Proleter Novi Sad	4	(0)
2016	Minsk	24	(8)
2017	Lamia	3	(1)
2017	Minsk	22	(3)
2018–2019	Proleter Novi Sad	48	(17)
2019–2022	Vojvodina	63	(16)
2022	Kunshan FC	32	(16)
2023–2024	Henan FC	50	(22)
2025–	Suzhou Dongwu	0	(0)

International career
2010	Serbia U19	3	(1)
2012	Serbia U21	1	(1)
2021	Serbia	2	(0)
- * Club domestic league appearances and goals as of 27 December 2024

Nemanja Čović (Serbian Cyrillic: Немања Човић; born 18 June 1991) is a Serbian professional footballer who plays as a forward for China League One club Suzhou Dongwu.

== Club career ==
=== Early years ===
Čović came through the Vojvodina youth categories, and began his professional career at the age of 16 at Cement Beočin, making 19 league appearances and scoring 5 goals. He said: "The goal was to continue the tradition, since all the men from my closest family started their careers in Cement. It is interesting that all of them were defenders, I am the only forward".

=== Vojvodina ===
During the summer of 2011, Čović was signed to Vojvodina by a free transfer. He scored against Vaduz in a game that Vojvodina lost 3–1 in the 2011–12 UEFA Europa League qualifying phase. Subsequently, having spent only a month with Vojvodina, Čović was traded to Spartak Zlatibor Voda. He made his league debut for his new club on 10 September 2011 in a 2–0 away victory over Novi Pazar.

=== China ===
==== Kunshan FC ====
On 2 May 2022, Čović joined China League One club Kunshan FC. He scored 16 goals in the 2022 China League One season, helped the team win the league title and get promoted to the Chinese Super League for the first time, however the club was dissolved in March 2023.

==== Henan FC ====
On 7 April 2023, Čović signed with Chinese Super League club Henan FC, reuniting with former Kunshan manager Sergio Zarco. He scored 15 goals in his first season in the top division, surpassing Leandro Netto's record in 2011 (14 goals) of most goals scored by a Henan player in a Chinese Super League season.

== International career ==
=== Youth level ===
Čović appeared for under-19 and scored a goal in three games. On 29 February 2012, Čović scored a goal in a friendly for Serbia's U21 team against Bosnia and Herzegovina U21.

=== Senior national team ===
Čović got his first call up to the senior Serbia side for the friendly games against Dominican Republic and Panama. He made his debut on 25 January 2021, as a substitution during halftime. In the second half of a draw game against Panama he took captain's armband.

== Career statistics ==
As of match played 1 June 2025

Appearances and goals by club, season and competition
Club	Season	League			Cup		Continental		Other		Total	
Club	Season	Division	Apps	Goals	Apps	Goals	Apps	Goals	Apps	Goals	Apps	Goals
Cement Beočin	2007–08	Vojvodina League West	19	5	—		—		—		19	5
Proleter Novi Sad	2008–09	Serbian League Vojvodina	19	4	—		—		—		19	4
Proleter Novi Sad	2009–10	Serbian First League	16	7	—		—		—		16	7
Proleter Novi Sad	Total		35	11	—		—		—		35	11
Parma	2010–11	Serie A	0	0	—		—		—		0	0
Vojvodina	2011–12	Serbian SuperLiga	1	0	—		2 (Note: Appearances in UEFA Europa League Qualifying rounds)	1	—		3	1
Spartak Subotica	2011–12	Serbian SuperLiga	13	1	3	0	—		—		16	1
Spartak Subotica	2012–13	Serbian First League	19	2	—		—		—		19	2
Spartak Subotica	Total		32	3	3	0	—		—		35	3
Donji Srem	2013–14	Serbian SuperLiga	6	0	1	0	—		—		7	0
Spartak Semey	2014	Kazakhstan First Division	9	3	—		—		—		9	3
Proleter Novi Sad	2014–15	Serbian First League	11	4	2	0	—		—		13	4
Shakhtyor Soligorsk	2015	Belarusian Premier League	15	3	7	1	2	0	1 (Note: Appearances in Belarusian Super Cup)	0	25	4
Proleter Novi Sad	2015–16	Serbian First League	4	0	—		—		—		4	0
Minsk	2016	Belarusian Premier League	24	8	3	0	—		—		27	8
Lamia	2016–17	Super League Greece 2	3	1	—		—		—		3	1
Minsk	2017	Belarusian Premier League	22	3	3	1	—		—		25	4
Proleter Novi Sad	2017–18	Serbian First League	14	7	—		—		—		14	7
Proleter Novi Sad	2018–19	Serbian SuperLiga	34	10	—		—		—		34	10
Proleter Novi Sad	Total		48	17	0	0	—		—		48	17
Vojvodina	2019–20	Serbian SuperLiga	9	2	3	1	—		—		12	3
Vojvodina	2020–21	Serbian SuperLiga	30	9	4	3	1	0	—		35	12
Vojvodina	2021–22	Serbian SuperLiga	24	5	2	1	4 (Note: Appearances in UEFA Europa Conference League Qualifying rounds)	1	—		30	7
Vojvodina	Total		63	16	9	5	5	1	—		77	22
Kunshan	2022	China League One	32	16	1	0	—		—		33	16
Henan	2023	Chinese Super League	24	15	0	0	—		—		24	15
Henan	2024	Chinese Super League	26	7	1	0	—		—		27	7
Henan	Total		50	22	1	0	—		—		51	22
Suzhou Dongwu	2025	China League One	11	5	1	0	—		—		12	5
Career total			385	117	31	7	9	2	1	0	426	126

=== International ===
Serbia
Year	Apps	Goals
2021	2	0

== Honours ==
=== Club ===
Proleter Novi Sad

- Serbian First League: 2017–18
- Serbian League Vojvodina: 2008–09

Shakhtyor Soligorsk

- Belarusian Cup runner-up: 2014–15
- Belarusian Super Cup runner-up: 2015

Vojvodina

- Serbian Cup: 2019–20

Kunshan

- China League One: 2022

=== Individual ===
- Province of Vojvodina Men's Player of the Year Award: 2018
- Vojvodina Player of the Season: 2020–21
