= Goran Vukliš =

Bosnian footballer

Personal information
- Date of birth: 24 September 1987 (age 39)
- Place of birth: Banja Luka, SR Bosnia and Herzegovina, SFR Yugoslavia
- Height: 1.87 m (6 ft 2 in)
- Position: Goalkeeper

Team information
- Current team: IMT
- Number: 24

Youth career
- 2002–2006: Zemun

Senior career*
Years	Team	Apps	(Gls)
2006–2009	Radnički Nova Pazova	2	(0)
2009–2010	Laktaši	7	(0)
2010–2011	Leotar	0	(0)
2011	BSK Banja Luka	8	(0)
2011–2014	Rudar Pljevlja	22	(0)
2014–2015	Grbalj	20	(0)
2015–2016	Petrovac	15	(0)
2016–2017	Borac Banja Luka	0	(0)
2017	OFK Beograd	7	(0)
2017–2018	Novi Pazar	0	(0)
2018	Borac Banja Luka	7	(0)
2018–2019	Sloboda Tuzla	24	(0)
2019–2022	Vojvodina	24	(0)
2019–2020	→ Kabel (loan)	27	(0)
2023	Radnik	0	(0)
2023–2024	RFK Novi Sad	5	(0)
2024–	IMT	32	(0)
- * Club domestic league appearances and goals as of 15 June 2025

Goran Vukliš (Serbian Cyrillic: Горан Вуклиш; born 24 September 1987) is a Bosnian footballer who plays as a goalkeeper for IMT in the Serbian Superliga.

== Club career ==
In February 2016, he was presented as a new arrival at Borac Banja Luka. Vukliš joined Sloboda Tuzla in summer 2018, but left them in summer 2019 for Vojvodina. He spent the 2019–20 season on loan at Kabel.
