= Nemanja Stojanović =

Serbian footballer

Personal information
- Full name: Nemanja Stojanović
- Date of birth: 9 April 1987 (age 39)
- Place of birth: Užice, SFR Yugoslavia
- Height: 1.85 m (6 ft 1 in)
- Position: Defensive midfielder

Youth career
- Borac Čačak

Senior career*
Years	Team	Apps	(Gls)
2005–2006	Borac Čačak	0	(0)
2006	→ Sloga Bajina Bašta (loan)		
2007	Balkan Mirijevo	13	(0)
2007–2008	Sloga Bajina Bašta	1	(0)
2008	→ Balkan Mirijevo (loan)		
2008–2009	Balkan Mirijevo		
2009–2011	Sloga Bajina Bašta	27	(2)
2011–2015	Mladost Lučani	86	(8)
2015	Sloboda Užice	11	(1)
2015–2016	Drina Zvornik	13	(2)
2016	Zemun	14	(1)
2016	Sloga Bajina Bašta		
2017	Hajduk Beograd		
2017	Drina Ljubovija		
2018	Nadur Youngsters		
2018–2019	Għarb Rangers		
2019–2020	Għajnsielem		
- * Club domestic league appearances and goals

Nemanja Stojanović (Serbian Cyrillic: Немања Стојановић; born 9 April 1987) is a Serbian football midfielder. He played in the Serbian First League from 2011 to 2017 for FK Mladost Lučani (2011–2015), FK Sloboda Užice (2014–2015), FK Drina Zvornik (2015–2016), and FK Zemun (2015–2017).

== Honours ==
Mladost

- Serbian First League: 2013–14
