= Miljan Vukadinović =

Serbian footballer

Personal information
- Date of birth: 27 December 1992 (age 33)
- Place of birth: Belgrade, FR Yugoslavia
- Height: 1.80 m (5 ft 11 in)
- Position: Winger

Team information
- Current team: Grafičar
- Number: 5

Youth career
- Rad
- Hajduk Beograd

Senior career*
Years	Team	Apps	(Gls)
2009–2011	Hajduk Beograd	52	(4)
2011–2014	MAS Táborsko	31	(5)
2014–2017	Mladá Boleslav	32	(0)
2015–2016	→ Slavia Prague (loan)	16	(2)
2018	Zemun	32	(7)
2019–2020	Napredak Kruševac	13	(4)
2020–2022	Vojvodina	69	(19)
2022–2023	Tobol	25	(2)
2024–2025	Mladost Novi Sad	52	(14)
2025-	Grafičar	32	(4)

International career
2021	Serbia	2	(0)
- * Club domestic league appearances and goals as of 14 May 2026

Miljan Vukadinović (Serbian Cyrillic: Миљан Вукадиновић; born 27 December 1992) is a Serbian professional footballer who plays as a winger for Grafičar.

== Club career ==
After starting out at Hajduk Beograd, Vukadinović moved abroad to the Czech Republic and played for MAS Táborsko, Mladá Boleslav, and Slavia Prague. He later returned to Serbia and joined Serbian SuperLiga side Zemun in January 2018.

In July 2019 Vukadinović joined SuperLiga club from Kruševac, Napredak.

On 14 January 2020, after a good half-season in Napredak, Vukadinović signed a 2.5 year contract with another SuperLiga club, Vojvodina.

On 5 July 2022, Vukadinović signed for Kazakh club Tobol.

== International career ==
Vukadinović was capped twice by Serbia in January 2021 friendly matches in Latin America.

== Personal life ==
Vukadinović is the younger brother of fellow footballer Vukadin Vukadinović.

== Honours ==
Mladá Boleslav

- Czech Cup: 2015–16

Vojvodina

- Serbian Cup: 2019–20

Individual

- Serbian SuperLiga Player of the Week: 2020–21 (Round 19, Round 21)
