= Subotica City Stadium =

Stadium in Subotica, Serbia

Coordinates: 46°04′54.41″N 19°40′37.05″E

Subotica City Stadium Градски стадион Суботица Gradski stadion Subotica
- Spale
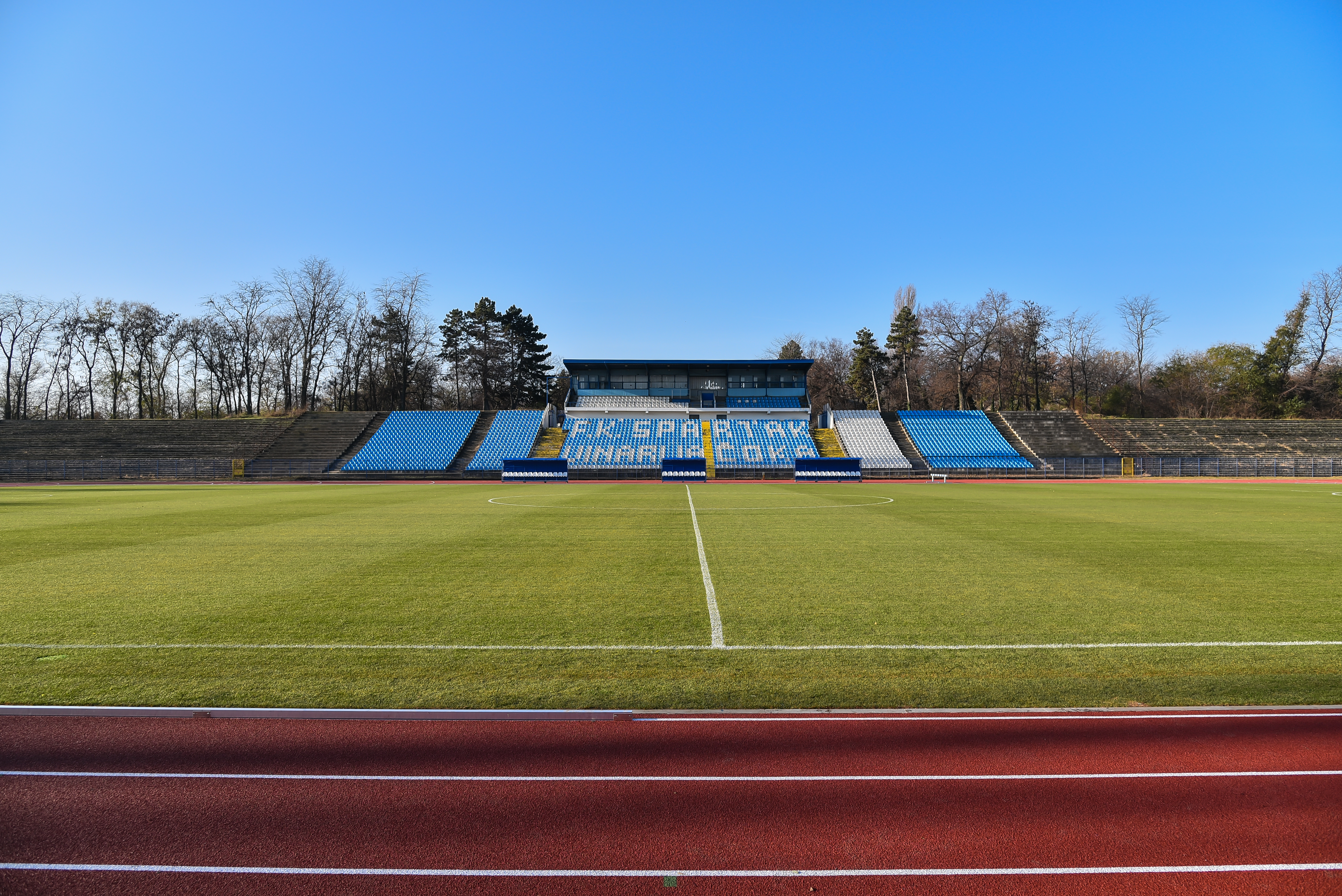
- The East Stand
- Interactive map of Subotica City Stadium; Градски стадион Суботица; Gradski stadion Subotica
- Full name: Subotica City Stadium
- Location: 117 Belgrade Road, Subotica, Serbia
- Owner: City of Subotica
- Operator: Spartak Subotica
- Capacity: 13,000
- Surface: Grass
- Field size: 110 × 70m

Construction
- Built: 1935–1936
- Opened: 6 June 1936; 90 years ago
- Renovated: 1972, 1978, 2000, 2012, 2017–2018

Tenant
- Spartak Subotica (1945–present)

Subotica City Stadium (Serbian: Градски стадион Суботица / Gradski stadion Subotica) is a multi-purpose stadium located in Subotica, Serbia. With a capacity of 13,000 people, it is currently used mostly for football matches and is the home ground of FK Spartak Subotica from 1945. There is a football pitch and a registered track for athletics suitable for competitions. One part of the stadium is covered. There are also two subsidiary football pitches.

== History ==
The stadium was built in 1936 and named "Stadion kralja Petra" (King Peter's Stadium), also known as "Sokolsko sletište" (Falcon's Landing Site). It was part of the major architectural project by Dr. Kosta Petrović named "Veliki narodni park" (Great People's Park) and meant to serve the city with all necessary structures for sports and entertainment. The initial capacity of the stadium was between 20 and 25,000 spectators. The stadium was inaugurated on 6 June 1936, for the "Sokolski slet", an event that gathered all the "Sokol" associations from the northern region of the Kingdom of Yugoslavia. The further development of the sports complex was interrupted with the beginning of the Second World War and never completed afterwards.

One of the main characteristics of the stadium is its rectangular shape. During the years it has gone through several renovations, in 1972, 1978, 2000, 2012 and 2018.

The stadium was host at the 1986 UEFA European Under-18 Championship.

== Gallery ==
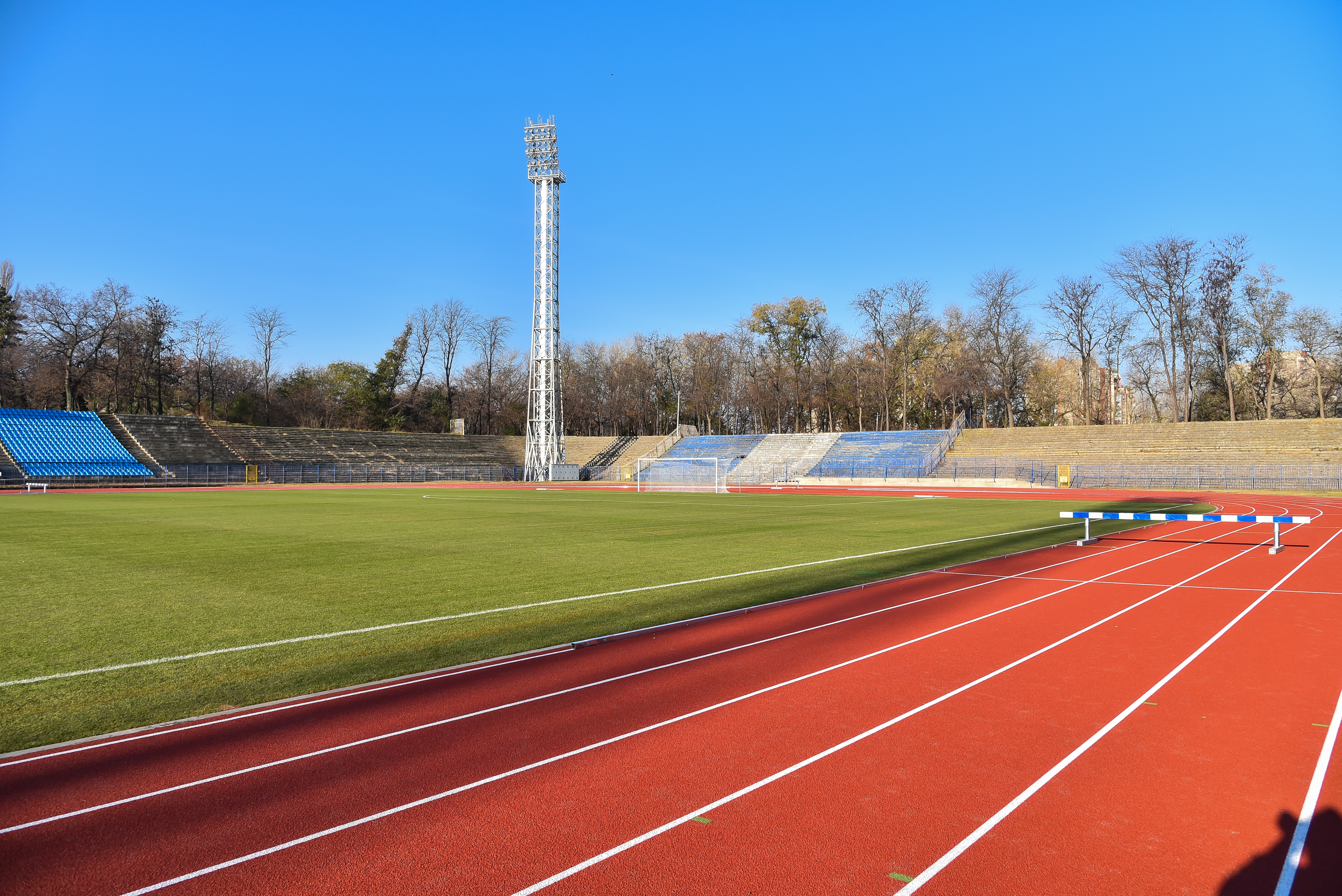
The Northern Stand

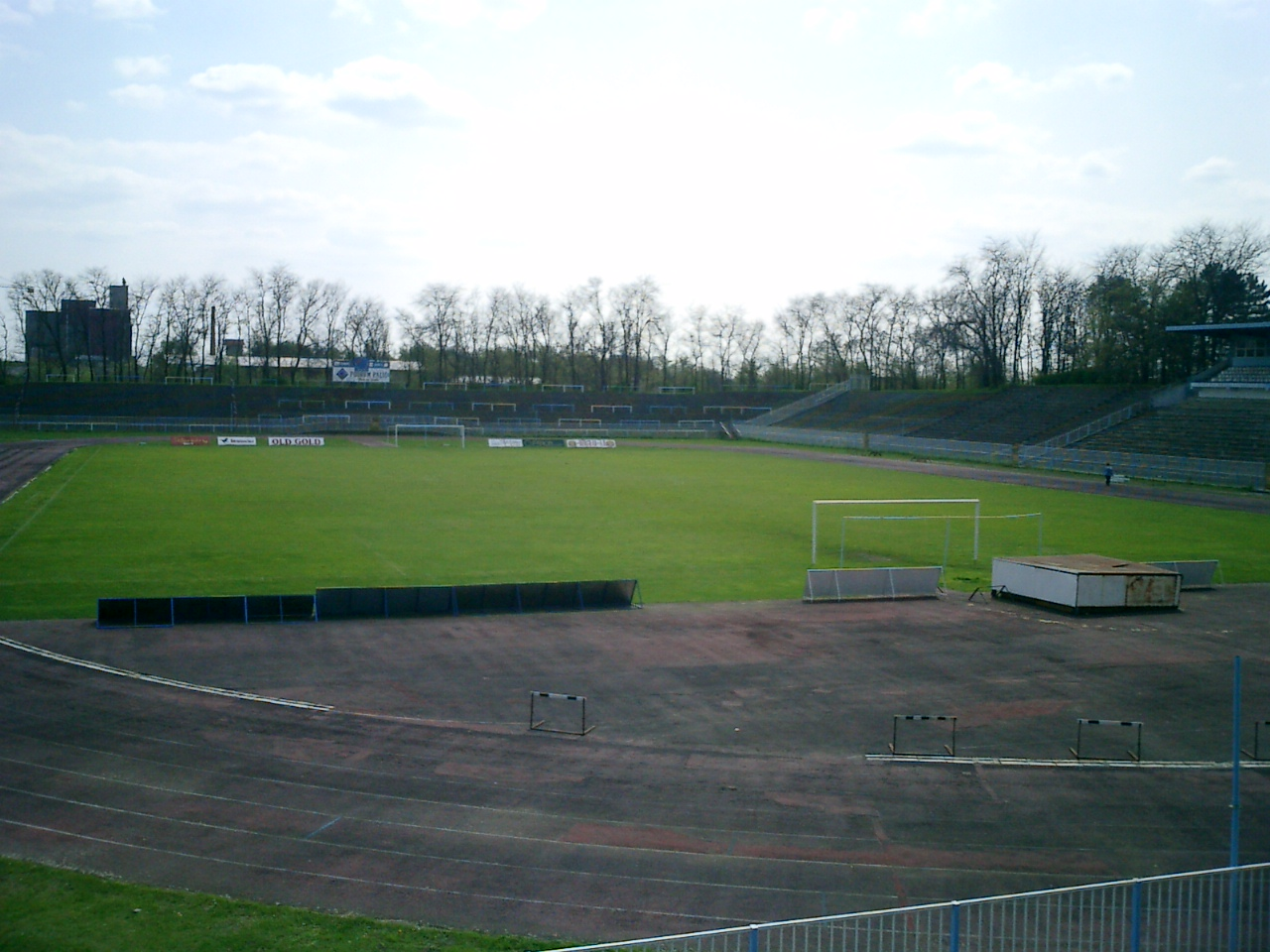
Stadion Subotica Spartak

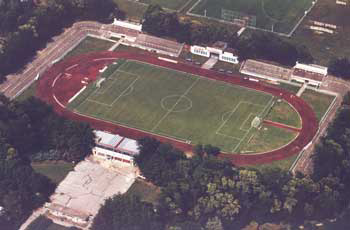
Older photo of stadium seen from air

== See also ==
- List of football stadiums in Serbia
