= 2019–20 Serbian Cup =

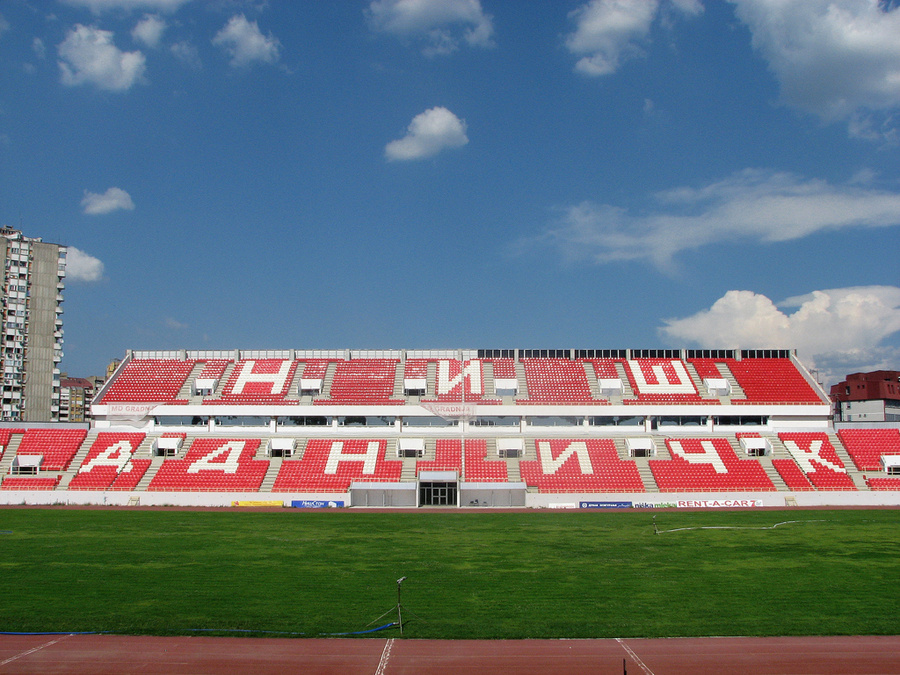
- Čair Stadium hosted the final

Tournament details
- Country: Serbia
- Teams: 34

Final positions
- Champions: Vojvodina
- Runners-up: Partizan
- Semifinalists: Čukarički; Red Star Belgrade

Tournament statistics
- Matches played: 33
- Goals scored: 97 (2.94 per match)
- Top goal scorer: Đorđe Ivanović (5)

The 2019–20 Serbian Cup season was the fourteenth season of the Serbian national football cup competition. It started on 11 September 2019, and ended on 24 June 2020. Vojvodina defeated the defending champions Partizan on penalties to win the title.

== Calendar ==
Round	Date(s)	Number of fixtures	Clubs	New entries this round
Preliminary round	11 September 2019	2	34 → 32	4
Round of 32	25/26 September, 9/10 October 2019	16	32 → 16	30
Round of 16	23 October 2019, 20 November 2019, 10 March 2020	8	16 → 8	none
Quarter-finals	3 June 2020	4	8 → 4	none
Semi-finals	10 June 2020	2	4 → 2	none
Final	24 June 2020	1	2 → 1	none

== Preliminary round ==
A preliminary round was held in order to reduce the number of teams competing in the first round to 32. It consisted of 2 single-legged ties, with a penalty shoot-out as the decider if the score was tied after 90 minutes.

11 September 2019	Jagodina Tabane	0–0 (5–6 p)	Teleoptik	Jagodina, Serbia
16:00		Report		Stadium: City Stadium

11 September 2019	Bratstvo 1946	3–0	Bečej 1918	Prigrevica, Serbia
16:00	Zečević 25'; Tanasić 33', 84'	Report		Stadium: Prigrevica Stadion; Attendance: 200; Referee: Danilo Nikolić

== Round of 32 ==
Draw for the first round took place on 13 September 2019. Matches will be played on 25 and 26 September 2019, with matches including Javor, Voždovac, Red Star and Partizan being postponed to 9 October and 10 October due to their earlier European fixtures. The match between Trepča and Red Star Belgrade was scheduled to take place in North Mitrovica on the 9th of October but was moved to Belgrade and rescheduled as the Red Star team were denied entry to Republic of Kosovo.

25 September 2019	Sinđelić Beograd	0–0 (4–2 p)	Zemun	Belgrade, Serbia
15:30		Report		Stadium: Stadion FK IMT; Attendance: 150; Referee: Miloš Živanović

25 September 2019	Napredak	1–1 (3–4 p)	TSC	Kruševac, Serbia
15:30	Ivanović 88' (pen.)	Report	Tumbasević 32'	Stadium: Mladost Stadium; Attendance: 1,000; Referee: Petar Piper

25 September 2019	Zlatibor	1–4	Vojvodina	Čajetina, Serbia
15:30	Nedeljković 80' (pen.)	Report	Kokir 8'; Bojić 27'; Stojković 55'; Zukić 86'	Stadium: Stadion Švajcarija; Attendance: 250; Referee: Danilo Grujić

25 September 2019	Inđija	2–0	Dinamo Vranje	Inđija, Serbia
15:30	V. Janjić 25'; Dimitrov 45'	Report		Stadium: Inđija Stadium; Attendance: 400; Referee: Momčilo Marković

25 September 2019	OFK Beograd	3–2	Rad	Belgrade, Serbia
15:30	Lazović 6', 56'; Janković 45'	Report	V. Trifunović 22'; Bjedov 64'	Stadium: Omladinski Stadium; Attendance: 500; Referee: Milan Ilić

25 September 2019	Bratstvo 1946	1–3	Mladost Lučani	Prigrevica, Serbia
15:30	Tanasić 75'	Report	Selenić 11'; Odita 45'; Obrovac 81'	Stadium: Prigrevica Stadion; Attendance: 700; Referee: Marko Ivković

25 September 2019	Budućnost Dobanovci	1–4	Radnički Niš	Dobanovci, Serbia
15:30	Perić 31'	Report	Lučić 2' (o.g.); Čumić 16'; Stevanović 30'; Knežević 87'	Stadium: Stadion FK Budućnost; Attendance: 150; Referee: Milan Mitić

25 September 2019	OFK Bačka	1–0	Radnički 1923	Bačka Palanka, Serbia
17:00	Đorđević 74'	Report		Stadium: Slavko Maletin Vava Stadium; Attendance: 300; Referee: Miloš Milanović

25 September 2019	Mačva Šabac	1–0	Metalac Gornji Milanovac	Šabac, Serbia
18:00	Milosavljević 33'	Report		Stadium: Gradski stadion Šabac; Attendance: 1,000; Referee: Andrija Stojanović

25 September 2019	Čukarički	3–1	Žarkovo	Belgrade, Serbia
18:00	Đurić 9' (o.g.); Birmančević 22'; Tedić 32'	Report	Čudić 72'	Stadium: Čukarički Stadium; Attendance: 300; Referee: Miloš Đorđić

25 September 2019	Spartak Subotica	2–0	Novi Pazar	Subotica, Serbia
18:00	Srećković 34'; Obradović 87' (pen.)	Report		Stadium: Subotica City Stadium; Attendance: 150; Referee: Jovan Šegrt

26 September 2019	Trayal	2–3	Radnik Surdulica	Kruševac, Serbia
15:30	Gogić 12'; Joof 65'	Report	Georgiev 24', 40'; Damnjanović 71'	Stadium: Mladost Stadium; Attendance: 200; Referee: Novica Anđelovski

9 October 2019	Vodojaža	0–6	Partizan	Grošnica, Serbia
15:00		Report	Ivanović 41', 46', 61', 67', 90'; Lutovac 66'	Stadium: Jankovske Klisure Stadium; Attendance: 3,000; Referee: Milan Ilić

9 October 2019	Proleter Novi Sad	2–1	Javor	Novi Sad, Serbia
15:00	Rušević 53', 65'	Report	Pavišić 42'	Stadium: Stadion Slana Bara; Referee: Miloš Đorđić

9 October 2019	Voždovac	2–2 (7–8 p)	Teleoptik	Belgrade, Serbia
15:00	Krasić 46'; Živojinović 71'	Report	Knežević 13'; Čolić 88'	Stadium: Voždovac Stadium; Attendance: 300; Referee: Marko Srećković

10 October 2019	Trepča	0–8	Red Star	Stara Pazova, Serbia
15:00		Report	Simić 3', 28', 49', 61'; van La Parra 50'; Vukanović 54'; Vulić 78'; Tomané 86'	Stadium: FSS Sport Center; Attendance: 1,000; Referee: Novak Simović

== Round of 16 ==
The 16 winners from first round will take part in this stage of the competition. The draw was held on 15 October 2019, and it contained seeded and unseeded teams. The seeds were determined by last season's final standings in the Serbian top divisions. Matches will be played on 23 October 2019, with matches including Red Star and Partizan being postponed to 20 November due to their European fixtures.

23 October 2019	OFK Beograd	1–2	Radnik Surdulica	Belgrade, Serbia
14:00	Veličković 41'	Report	Damnjanović 21'; Makarić 78'	Stadium: Omladinski Stadium; Attendance: 500; Referee: Milan Mitić

23 October 2019	Inđija	2–1	Proleter Novi Sad	Inđija, Serbia
14:00	Bastajić 21'; Bosančić 37' (pen.)	Report	Šćepanović 78' (pen.)	Stadium: Inđija Stadium; Attendance: 400; Referee: Lazar Lukić

23 October 2019	Teleoptik	0–1	Čukarički	Belgrade, Serbia
14:00		Report	Stojanović 74' (pen.)	Stadium: SC Partizan-Teleoptik; Attendance: 200; Referee: Marko Ivković

23 October 2019	Radnički Niš	2–0	OFK Bačka	Niš, Serbia
14:00	Pantelić 74'; Đilas 77'	Report		Stadium: Čair Stadium; Attendance: 400; Referee: Dalibor Manojlović

23 October 2019	Vojvodina	4–0	Sinđelić Beograd	Novi Sad, Serbia
18:00	Korkhovoy 5' (o.g.); Zukić 35' (pen.), 57'; Đurić 81'	Report		Stadium: Karađorđe Stadium; Attendance: 500; Referee: Milan Stefanović

23 October 2019	Mladost Lučani	1–1 (5–4 p)	TSC	Lučani, Serbia
18:00	Sinđić 31'	Report	Galić 74'	Stadium: Mladost Stadium; Attendance: 400; Referee: Miloš Milanović

20 November 2019	Red Star	1–0	Mačva Šabac	Belgrade, Serbia
18:00	Boakye 66'	Report		Stadium: Rajko Mitić Stadium; Referee: Danilo Grujić

10 March 2020	Partizan	4–0	Spartak Subotica	Belgrade, Serbia
18:00	L. Pavlović 25', 56'; Milanović 48' (a.g.); Matić 62'	Report		Stadium: Partizan Stadium; Referee: Petar Piper

== Quarter-finals ==
3 June 2020	Čukarički	3–2	Radnički Niš	Belgrade, Serbia
15:00 CEST	Tedić 45' (pen.), 82', 90+2'	Report	Čumić 14', 23'	Stadium: Čukarički Stadium; Attendance: 600; Referee: Novak Simović

3 June 2020	Radnik Surdulica	1–2	Partizan	Surdulica, Serbia
17:30	Stamenković 45+15'	Report	Asano 45+1', 45+14'	Stadium: Surdulica City Stadium; Attendance: 0 Referee: Srđan Jovanović

2 June 2020	Inđija	1–2	Red Star	Inđija, Serbia
17:00 CEST	Jovanović 87'	Report	Ivanić 35'; Ben 38'	Stadium: Inđija Stadium; Attendance: 800; Referee: Lazar Lukić

3 June 2020	Vojvodina	0–0 (5–4 p)	Mladost Lučani	Novi Sad, Serbia
20:00 CEST		Report		Stadium: Karađorđe Stadium; Attendance: 0 Referee: Danilo Grujić

== Semi-finals ==
10 June 2020	Čukarički	0–1	Vojvodina	Belgrade, Serbia
17:00 CEST		Report	Čović 31'	Stadium: Čukarički Stadium; Attendance: 1,500; Referee: Danilo Grujić

10 June 2020	Partizan	1–0	Red Star	Belgrade, Serbia
20:00 CEST	Natkho 58'	Report		Stadium: Partizan Stadium; Attendance: 16,000; Referee: Novak Simović

== Final ==
24 June 2020	Vojvodina	2–2 (4–2 p)	Partizan	Niš, Serbia
19:00 CEST	Vukadinović 38'; Bojić 56'		Stevanović 80'; S. Pavlović 96'	Stadium: Čair Stadium; Attendance: 5,000; Referee: Danilo Grujić

== Top goalscorers ==
Rank	Player	Club	Goals
1	(Serbia) Đorđe Ivanović	Partizan	5
2	(Serbia) Veljko Simić	Red Star	4
2	(Serbia) Slobodan Tedić	Čukarički	4
4	(Serbia) Nikola Čumić	Radnički Niš	3
4	(Serbia) Petar Tanasić	Bratstvo 1946	3
4	(Serbia) Dejan Zukić	Vojvodina	3
