= FK Kabel =

Serbian football club

Kabel
- Full name: Fudbalski Klub Kabel
- Nicknames: Kabelovci (The Cable Men); Crveno-crni (The Red-Blacks)
- Founded: 1932; 94 years ago
- Ground: Stadium FK Proleter
- Capacity: 1,200
- President: Nenad Miljuš
- Head coach: Miroslav Smajić
- League: Serbian First League
- 2024–25: Serbian League Vojvodina, 1st of 16
- Website: fkkabel.com
Home colours	Away colours

FK Kabel (Serbian Cyrillic: ФК Кабел) is a football club based in Novi Sad, Vojvodina, Serbia. They compete in the Serbian First League, the second tier of the national league system.

== History ==
The club was founded by workers of a local cable factory in 1932. They competed in the local leagues of Novi Sad over the next few years. In 1945, following the end of World War II, the club was refounded by the factory's workers and given its original name. The name was briefly changed to Metalac in 1947, but reverted after only a few months.

In 1975, the club reached the Vojvodina League for the first time ever. They remained in the third tier of Yugoslav football for two seasons. The club would return to the Vojvodina League on two more occasions in 1978 and 1983. They eventually finished as champions of the third tier in 1986–87 to reach the Yugoslav Second League (Group West). However, the club suffered relegation after just one year and continued competing in the newly formed Yugoslav Inter-Republic League (Group North).

Following the breakup of Yugoslavia, the club placed third in the NATO bombing-suspended 1998–99 Serbian League Vojvodina and gained promotion to the Second League of FR Yugoslavia (Group North). They spent three consecutive seasons in the second tier before being relegated in 2002. Subsequently, the club competed in the Serbian League Vojvodina for two years before dropping to the Vojvodina League West in 2004.

After finishing as runners-up in the 2016–17 Vojvodina League South, the club won the title in the next season and took promotion to the Serbian League Vojvodina. They subsequently placed first in the third tier and gained promotion to the Serbian First League in 2019. The club remained in the second tier for three years until relegation in 2022.

== Honours ==
- Vojvodina League / Serbian League Vojvodina (Tier 3)
  - 1986–87, 2018–19
- Novi Sad-Srem Zone League / Vojvodina League West / Vojvodina League South (Tier 4)
  - 1973–74, 1974–75, 1977–78, 1982–83, 1995–96, 2017–18

== Seasons ==
Season	League									Cup
Season	Division	Pld	W	D	L	GF	GA	Pts	Pos	Cup
Serbia and Montenegro
1995–96	4 – Vojvodina West	34	22	5	7	83	25	71	1st	—
1996–97	3 – Vojvodina	34	12	8	14	57	45	44	9th	—
1997–98	3 – Vojvodina	34	17	5	12	58	31	56	4th	—
1998–99	3 – Vojvodina	17 (Note: The season was cut short due to the NATO bombing of Yugoslavia.)	–	–	–	–	–	30	3rd	—
1999–2000	2 – North	34	12	4	18	40	54	40	15th	—
2000–01	2 – North	34	12	5	17	37	46	41	13th	—
2001–02	2 – North	34	6	7	21	32	71	25	16th	—
2002–03	3 – Vojvodina	34	14	6	14	58	46	48	6th	—
2003–04	3 – Vojvodina	34	6	6	22	39	76	24	16th	—
2004–05	4 – Vojvodina West	30	17	4	9	45	38	55	4th	—
2005–06	4 – Vojvodina West	30	6	8	16	23	32	25 (Note: The club was docked one point.)	15th	—
Serbia
2008–09	5 – Novi Sad	32	15	9	8	62	37	54	4th	—
2009–10	5 – Novi Sad	30	12	5	13	47	49	41	8th	—
2010–11	5 – Novi Sad	30	18	7	5	50	26	61	2nd	—
2011–12	5 – Novi Sad	28	15	3	10	51	34	48	3rd	—
2012–13	5 – Novi Sad	30	14	8	8	53	29	50	2nd	—
2013–14	5 – Novi Sad	30	21	5	4	63	24	68	2nd	—
2014–15	4 – Novi Sad-Srem	30	11	6	13	39	32	39	11th	—
2015–16	4 – Novi Sad-Srem	30	11	10	9	50	43	43	7th	—
2016–17	4 – Vojvodina South	30	18	6	6	54	28	60	2nd	—
2017–18	4 – Vojvodina South	30	21	6	3	58	27	69	1st	—
2018–19	3 – Vojvodina	32	25	2	5	77	23	77	1st	—
2019–20	2	30 (Note: The season was shortened due to the COVID-19 pandemic in Serbia.)	14	10	6	31	20	42 (Note: The club was docked 10 points for match-fixing.)	7th	—
2020–21	2	34	18	11	5	41	18	65	3rd	Round of 32
2021–22	2	37	2	7	28	15	89	13	16th	Preliminary round
2022–23	3 – Vojvodina	28	11	4	13	35	35	37	7th	Round of 32
2023–24	3 – Vojvodina	30	11	11	8	46	37	44	8th	—
2024–25	3 – Vojvodina	30	16	8	6	60	19	56	1st	—

== Current squad ==
As of 31 August 2025

Note: Flags indicate national team as defined under FIFA eligibility rules; some limited exceptions apply. Players may hold more than one non-FIFA nationality.

No.	Pos.	Nation	Player
1	GK	SRB	Nemanja Toroman (on loan from Vojvodina; captain)
2	MF	SRB	Filip Boboš
3	DF	SRB	Luka Kljajić
4	FW	SRB	Milan Kolarević (dual registration with Vojvodina)
5	DF	SRB	Marko Pavić (on loan from Vojvodina)
6	DF	SRB	Vladimir Mićunović (on loan from Vojvodina)
7	FW	SRB	Uroš Paunović (on loan from Vojvodina)
9	FW	BIH	Stefan Šavija
11	MF	SRB	Dario Janjić (on loan from Vojvodina)
12	GK	SRB	Nikola Perin
13	DF	SRB	Nenad Kočović
14	MF	SRB	Zoran Karać
15	DF	SRB	Ivan Rogač
16	MF	SRB	Nikola Ninković (on loan from Vojvodina)
17	MF	SRB	Vladan Vidaković

No.	Pos.	Nation	Player
18	FW	SRB	Vuk Boškan (dual registration with Vojvodina)
19	FW	SRB	Itan Derviši
20	FW	SRB	Marko Božičić (on loan from Vojvodina)
21	MF	SRB	Vanja Apostolovski
22	GK	SRB	Branko Nikolić (on loan from Vojvodina)
23	FW	SRB	Nikola Tedić
24	MF	RUS	Egor Kuzmin
25	FW	BIH	Mihajlo Savanović
26	DF	SRB	Stefan Marjanović
27	FW	SRB	Petar Sukačev (dual registration with Vojvodina)
28	DF	SRB	Aleksandar Tanasin (captain)
29	DF	SRB	Vukašin Jelić
30	MF	SRB	Andrej Pivaš (on loan from Vojvodina)
31	FW	SRB	Ivan Stojšić

=== Coaching staff ===
Position	Name
Manager	(Serbia) Miroslav Smajić
Assistant manager	(Serbia) Marko Petrović
Fitness coach	(Serbia) Vladimir Šipka
Goalkeeping coach	(Serbia) Boško Knežević
Analyst coach	(Serbia) Ljubomir Ristovski
Physiotherapist	(Serbia) Milan Grubović
Doctor	(Serbia) Bratoljub Brkljača
General secretary	(Serbia) Milan Živković
Security commissioner	(Serbia) Vladimir Milutinović

== Notable players ==
This is a list of players who have played at full international level.

- (Serbia) Željko Brkić
- (Serbia) Dimitrije Injac
- (Serbia) Marko Klisura
- (Serbia and Montenegro) Igor Bogdanović

For a list of all FK Kabel players with a Wikipedia article, see Category:FK Kabel players.

== Historical list of coaches ==
- (Serbia and Montenegro) Dragan Krsmanović
- (Serbia and Montenegro) Vladimir Savić (1999–2000)
- (Serbia and Montenegro) Miodrag Stančetić
- (Serbia and Montenegro) Budimir Pajić
- (Serbia and Montenegro) Dragan Krsmanović (2002–2003)
- (Serbia and Montenegro) Spasoje Jelačić
- (Serbia and Montenegro) Miroslav Ćurčić
- (Serbia and Montenegro) Dragan Krsmanović
- (Serbia and Montenegro) Zoran Grujić
- (Serbia) Saša Milanović
- (Serbia) Stevan Vukomanović (2017–2018)
- (Serbia) Milan Belić (2018–2019)
- (Serbia) Zoran Vasiljević (2019–2021)
- (Serbia) Milan Belić (2021–2022)
- (Serbia) Nemanja Krtolica (2022–2023)
- (Serbia) Miloš Penić (2023–2024)
- (Montenegro) Savo Pavićević (2024)
- (Serbia) Stevan Vukomanović (2024)
- (Serbia) Dušan Bajić (2025)
- (Bosnia and Herzegovina) Bojan Puzigaća (2026)
