= 2019–20 FK Vojvodina season =

FK Vojvodina
2019–20 season
- President: Vojislav Gajić
- Head coach: Nenad Lalatović
- Stadium: Karađorđe Stadium
- Serbian SuperLiga: 3rd
- Serbian Cup: Winners
- Top goalscorer: League: Bojan Matić (9); All: Bojan Matić (9)
- Highest home attendance: 9,147 vs Red Star Belgrade (31 August 2019)
- Lowest home attendance: 0 vs Čukarički (29 May 2020)
- Average home league attendance: 2,934
Home colours	Away colours
- All statistics correct as of October 26, 2020.

The 2019–20 season was Vojvodina's 105th season in existence and the club's 14th competing in the Serbian SuperLiga.

== Transfers ==
=== In ===
Date	Position	Name	From	Type	Ref.
23 June 2019	DF	(Serbia) Nemanja Vučić	(Serbia) Zemun	Free Transfer	
29 June 2019	MF	(Montenegro) Nikola Drinčić	(Serbia) Radnički Niš	Free Transfer	
29 June 2019	DF	(Serbia) Đorđe Đurić	(Serbia) Čukarički	Free Transfer	
29 June 2019	MF	(Serbia) Petar Bojić	(Serbia) Mladost Lučani	Free Transfer	
29 June 2019	MF	(Serbia) Marko Đurišić	(Serbia) Dinamo Vranje	Free Transfer	
29 June 2019	DF	(Serbia) Nikola Vasiljević	(Belarus) BATE Borisov	Free Transfer	
29 June 2019	FW	(Serbia) Miodrag Gemović	(Serbia) Mačva Šabac	Free Transfer	
29 June 2019	MF	(Serbia) Jovan Kokir	(Serbia) Partizan	Free Transfer	
2 July 2019	FW	(Serbia) Nemanja Čović	(Serbia) Proleter Novi Sad	Free Transfer	
26 July 2019	MF	(Slovenia) Željko Filipović	(Kazakhstan) Atyrau	Free Transfer	
19 August 2019	FW	(Serbia) Nemanja Nikolić	(Serbia) Partizan	Loan	
4 September 2019	DF	(Serbia) Nikola Petković	(China) Sichuan Longfor	Free Transfer	
Winter transfers
4 January 2020	MF	(Serbia) Miljan Vukadinović	(Serbia) Napredak	Free Transfer	
8 January 2020	DF	(England) Lazar Stojsavljević	Free Agent	Free Transfer	
24 January 2020	DF	(Serbia) Nikola Andrić	(Serbia) Mladost Lučani	Free Transfer	
24 January 2020	DF	(Serbia) Nikola Mirić	(Serbia) Partizan	Free Transfer	
24 January 2020	FW	(Bosnia and Herzegovina) Momčilo Mrkaić	(Serbia) Javor Ivanjica	Free Transfer	
24 January 2020	MF	(Serbia) Bogdan Mladenović	(Portugal) Gil Vicente	Free Transfer	
24 January 2020	DF	(Serbia) Stefan Đorđević	(Serbia) Radnički Niš	Free Transfer	
24 January 2020	DF	(Romania) Constantin Nica	(Romania) Viitorul Constanța	Free Transfer	
24 January 2020	MF	(Montenegro) Petar Pavlićević	(Portugal) Benfica	Free Transfer	
9 February 2020	DF	(Croatia) Slavko Bralić	(Greece) AEL	Free Transfer	

=== Out ===
Date	Position	Name	To	Type	Ref.
3 July 2019	DF	(Bosnia and Herzegovina) Daniel Graovac	(Romania) Astra Giurgiu	Free Transfer	
5 July 2019	MF	(Serbia) Nikola Srećković	(Serbia) Spartak Subotica	Free Transfer	
6 July 2019	MF	(Bosnia and Herzegovina) Damir Zlomislić	(Bosnia and Herzegovina) Zrinjski Mostar	Free Transfer	
10 July 2019	FW	(Liberia) Seku Coneh		Broken contract	
10 July 2019	MF	(Bosnia and Herzegovina) Dobrica Tegetlija	(Austria) First Vienna	Free Transfer	
20 July 2019	FW	(Serbia) Dragoljub Savić	(Austria) Rapid Wien II	Free Transfer	
21 July 2019	MF	(Serbia) Aleksandar Mesarović	(Serbia) Napredak	Free Transfer	
22 July 2019	DF	(Serbia) Marko Mandić	(Serbia) Kabel	Loan	
22 July 2019	FW	(Serbia) Đorđe Pantelić	(Serbia) Kabel	Loan	
22 July 2019	GK	(Serbia) Vukašin Pilipović	(Serbia) Kabel	Loan	
22 July 2019	DF	(Serbia) Marko Bjeković	(Serbia) Kabel	Loan	
2 August 2019	MF	(Serbia) Damjan Gojkov	(Serbia) Spartak Subotica	Free Transfer	
4 August 2019	FW	(Serbia) Nikola Gajić	(Spain) Extremadura B	Free Transfer	
8 August 2019	MF	(Serbia) Milan Đurić	(Australia) Central Coast Mariners	Free Transfer	
21 August 2019	MF	(Greece) Nemanja Milojević	(Greece) Panionios	Free Transfer	
29 August 2019	MF	(Serbia) Vuk Mitošević	(Serbia) Radnik Surdulica	Free Transfer	
Winter transfers
4 January 2020	DF	(Serbia) Nikola Petković		Broken contract	
4 January 2020	MF	(Slovenia) Željko Filipović		Broken contract	
4 January 2020	DF	(Serbia) Milan Lazarević	(Serbia) Rad	Free Transfer	
4 January 2020	DF	(Serbia) Nemanja Vučić	(Serbia) Voždovac	Free Transfer	
4 January 2020	FW	(Serbia) Nemanja Nikolić	(Serbia) Partizan	End of Loan	
24 January 2020	FW	(Serbia) Bojan Matić	(Serbia) Partizan	Transfer	
28 January 2020	MF	(Nigeria) Eze Vincent Okehuie	(Serbia) Čukarički	Transfer	
1 February 2020	DF	(Serbia) Nikola Vasiljević	(Serbia) Kolubara	Free Transfer	
9 February 2020	DF	(Serbia) Ranko Veselinović	(Canada) Vancouver Whitecaps	Loan	
5 March 2020	MF	(Serbia) Marko Đurišić	(Latvia) Riga	Transfer	

== Pre-season and friendlies ==
3 July 2019	Brežice	1–8	Vojvodina	Terme Čatež, Slovenia
18:00	Adamić 18'	Report	Čović 16'; Đuričin 52', 66', 75', 84'; Milojević 54'; Komljenović 65' (o.g.); Matić 90'	Attendance: 0

5 July 2019	Triglav Kranj	2–3	Vojvodina	Krško, Slovenia
18:00	Petric 82'; Idrizi 88'	Report	Zukić 65'; Nešković 72', 85'	Stadium: Matija Gubec Stadium; Attendance: 30

8 July 2019	Krško	0–1	Vojvodina	Krško, Slovenia
17:00		Report	Zukić 45'	Stadium: Matija Gubec Stadium; Attendance: 100

11 July 2019	Brežice	1–2	Vojvodina	Brežice, Slovenia
18:00	Matič 89'	Report	Đuričin 3'; Saničanin 30'	Stadium: Brežice Stadium; Attendance: 20

18 January 2020	Vojvodina	1–0	Kabel	Novi Sad
13:00	Vukadinović 80'	Report		Stadium: Vujadin Boškov Football centre Attendance: 200

22 January 2020	Vojvodina	2–1	Spartak	Novi Sad
13:00	Gemović 18'; Vukadinović 69'	Report	Šormaz 15'	Stadium: Vujadin Boškov Football centre Attendance: 150

26 January 2020	Vojvodina	1–1	Shakhtar	Belek, Turkey
15:30	Bolbat 80' (o.g.)	Report	Alan 83'	Stadium: Susesi; Attendance: 150

29 January 2020	Vojvodina	2–0	Rapid Wien	Belek, Turkey
15:30	Mrkaić 29'; Čović 59'	Report		Stadium: Max Rojal; Attendance: 50

1 February 2020	Vojvodina	2–3	Maribor	Belek, Turkey
17:00	Čović 49' (pen.); Zukić 69'	Report	Pihler 37'; Viler 64'; Kotnik 90'	Stadium: Susesi; Attendance: 50

3 February 2020	Vojvodina	0–0	Lviv	Belek, Turkey
14:00		Report		Stadium: Susesi; Attendance: 30

5 February 2020	Vojvodina	2–2	Freiberg	Belek, Turkey
14:30	Zukić 5'; Čović 17'	Report	Kajser 49'; Kutlu 76'	Stadium: Susesi; Attendance: 50

6 February 2020	Vojvodina	0–3	Rubin Kazan	Belek, Turkey
13:00		Report	Danchenko 44'; Jevtić 58'; Starfelt 87'	Stadium: Belis; Attendance: 100

23 May 2020	Vojvodina	0–1	Spartak	Novi Sad
13:00		Report	Denković 53' (pen.)	Stadium: Vujadin Boškov Football centre Attendance: 0

== Competitions ==
=== Serbian SuperLiga ===
==== Regular season ====
===== League table =====
Pos	Team	Pld	W	D	L	GF	GA	GD	Pts	Qualification
1	Red Star Belgrade (C)	30	25	3	2	68	18	+50	78	Qualification for the Champions League first qualifying round
2	Partizan	30	20	4	6	69	25	+44	64	Qualification for the Europa League first qualifying round
3	Vojvodina	30	19	5	6	47	27	+20	62	Qualification for the Europa League third qualifying round (Note: Vojvodina qualified for the Europa League third qualifying round by winning the 2019–20 Serbian Cup. As a result, the spot awarded to the third-placed team (Europa League first qualifying round) was passed to the fourth-placed team.)
4	TSC	30	17	8	5	59	34	+25	59	Qualification for the Europa League first qualifying round
5	Radnički Niš	30	16	4	10	51	37	+14	52	

Source: SuperLiga (in Serbian), Soccerway
Rules for classification: 1) Points; 2) Head-to-head points; 3) Head-to-head goal difference; 4) Head-to-head goals scored; 5) Head-to-head away goals scored (if two teams tied); 6) Goal difference; 7) Goals scored; 8) Fair play ranking; 9) Draw.
(C) Champions

===== Results by matchday =====
Round	1	2	3	4	5	6	7	8	9	10	11	12	13	14	15	16	17	18	19	20	21	22	23	24	25	26	27	28	29	30
Ground	H	A	H	A	H	A	H	A	H	A	H	A	H	H	A	A	H	A	H	A	H	A	H	A	H	A	H	A	A	H
Result	W	W	W	W	D	W	L	W	L	W	W	D	D	W	L	W	W	W	W	L	W	L	W	W	W	D	D	W	L	W
Position	2	2	1	1	2	2	4	3	4	4	3	3	4	3	4	3	3	3	2	3	3	3	3	3	3	3	3	3	4	3

Updated to match(es) played on 21 June 2020. Source: https://www.superliga.rs/sezone/2019-20/team/5-super-liga-srbije-2019-20/15-vojvodina
A = Away; H = Home; W = Win; D = Draw; L = Loss

=== Results ===
20 July 2019 1	Vojvodina	3–1	Mačva	Bačka Palanka
20:00	Matić 50', 52'; Gemović 90+2'	Report	Stevanović 79'	Stadium: Stadion Slavko Maletin Vava; Attendance: 2,000; Referee: (Serbia) Petar Piper

28 July 2019 2	Napredak	0–2	Vojvodina	Kruševac
20:00		Report	Đuričin 49'; Zukić 90+3'	Stadium: Mladost Stadium (Kruševac); Attendance: 1,514; Referee: (Serbia) Momčilo Marković

3 August 2019 3	Vojvodina	5–0	Rad	Novi Sad
20:00	Matić 22'; Đuričin 23'; Eze 45'; Nešković 75', 81'	Report		Stadium: Karađorđe Stadium; Attendance: 2,085; Referee: (Serbia) Đorđe Maksimović

11 August 2019 4	Radnik Surdulica	0–4	Vojvodina	Surdulica
20:00		Report	Eze 17'; Gemović 19'; Matić 26'; Zukić 83'	Stadium: Surdulica City Stadium; Attendance: 2,041; Referee: (Serbia) Miloš Đorđić

18 August 2019 5	Vojvodina	2–2	TSC	Novi Sad
20:00	Matić 72'; Eze 90+5'	Report	Lukić 49', 65'	Stadium: Karađorđe Stadium; Attendance: 7,124; Referee: (Serbia) Srđan Jovanović

24 August 2019 6	Proleter	0–1	Vojvodina	Novi Sad
20:00		Report	Đuričin 13'	Stadium: Karađorđe Stadium; Attendance: 3,212; Referee: (Serbia) Đorđe Maksimović

31 August 2019 7	Vojvodina	1–2	Red Star Belgrade	Novi Sad
18:45	Stojković 36'	Report	Pavkov 25'; Mateo 59'	Stadium: Karađorđe Stadium; Attendance: 9,147; Referee: (Serbia) Jovan Šegrt

13 September 2019 8	Radnički Niš	1–2	Vojvodina	Niš
18:00	Mihajlović 8'	Report	Matić 33'; Devetak 79'	Stadium: Čair Stadium; Attendance: 2,504; Referee: (Serbia) Novak Simović

21 September 2019 9	Vojvodina	1–2	Voždovac	Novi Sad
20:00	Nikolić 67' (pen.)	Report	Stanisavljević 62'; Nikolić 64'	Stadium: Karađorđe Stadium; Attendance: 2,500; Referee: (Serbia) Aleksandar Živković

29 September 2019 10	Mladost Lučani	1–2	Vojvodina	Lučani
18:00	Bojović 36'	Report	Drinčić 12'; Matić 85'	Stadium: Mladost Stadium; Attendance: 510; Referee: (Serbia) Milan Mitić

4 October 2019 11	Vojvodina	2–0	Spartak	Novi Sad
18:00	Bojić 29'; Nikolić 41'	Report		Stadium: Karađorđe Stadium; Attendance: 1,523; Referee: (Serbia) Nenad Minaković

18 October 2019 12	Čukarički	0–0	Vojvodina	Belgrade
18:00		Report		Stadium: Čukarički Stadium; Attendance: 505; Referee: (Serbia) Miloš Milanović

26 October 2019 13	Vojvodina	2–2	Javor Ivanjica	Novi Sad
18:00	Veselinović 3'; Bojić 44'	Report	Petković 19'; Zvekanov 73'	Stadium: Karađorđe Stadium; Attendance: 2,538; Referee: (Serbia) Aleksandar Živković

30 October 2019 14	Vojvodina	1–0	Inđija	Novi Sad
18:00	Nikolić 69' (pen.)	Report		Stadium: Karađorđe Stadium; Attendance: 1,500; Referee: (Serbia) Lazar Lukić

2 November 2019 15	Partizan	4–0	Vojvodina	Belgrade
14:00	Natkho 30' (pen.), 43'; Zdjelar 48'; Sadiq 69'	Report		Stadium: Partizan Stadium; Attendance: 2,497; Referee: (Serbia) Miloš Đorđić

9 November 2020 16	Mačva	0–1	Vojvodina	Šabac
18:00		Report	Matić 7'	Stadium: Šabac City Stadium; Attendance: 2,100; Referee: (Serbia) Jovan Šegrt

23 November 2019 17	Vojvodina	2–1	Napredak	Novi Sad
18:00	Matić 10' (pen.); Gemović 86'	Report	Zec 28'	Stadium: Karađorđe Stadium; Attendance: 1,200; Referee: (Serbia) Srđan Jovanović

30 November 2019 18	Rad	1–2	Vojvodina	Belgrade
16:00	Perendija 21' (pen.)	Report	Topić 28'; Stojković 45+3'	Stadium: King Peter I Stadium; Attendance: 413; Referee: (Serbia) Aleksandar Živković

4 December 2019 19	Vojvodina	1–0	Radnik Surdulica	Novi Sad
17:00	Bojić 63'	Report		Stadium: Karađorđe Stadium; Attendance: 1,067; Referee: (Serbia) Dragan Čolović

8 December 2019 20	TSC	2–0	Vojvodina	Senta
15:00	Duronjić 33'; Silađi 84'	Report		Stadium: Senta Stadium; Attendance: 1,520; Referee: (Serbia) Srđan Jovanović

15 February 2020 21	Vojvodina	1–0	Proleter	Novi Sad
18:00	Drinčić 56'	Report		Stadium: Karađorđe Stadium; Attendance: 3,547; Referee: (Serbia) Novak Simović

22 February 2020 22	Red Star Belgrade	2–0	Vojvodina	Belgrade
18:00	Ben 18'; Gobeljić 66'	Report		Stadium: Rajko Mitić Stadium; Attendance: 25,800; Referee: (Serbia) Petar Piper

26 February 2020 23	Vojvodina	3–0	Radnički Niš	Novi Sad
18:00	Mrkaić 1', 90+1'; Vukadinović 70'	Report		Stadium: Karađorđe Stadium; Attendance: 1,510; Referee: (Serbia) Dragan Čolović

1 March 2020 24	Voždovac	1–2	Vojvodina	Belgrade
14:00	Zličić 21'	Report	Bojić 31'; Vukadinović 48'	Stadium: Voždovac Stadium; Attendance: 1,000; Referee: (Serbia)

7 March 2021 25	Vojvodina	2–1	Mladost Lučani	Novi Sad
16:00	Čović 66'; Zečević 74' (o.g.)	Report	Šatara 82'	Stadium: Karađorđe Stadium; Attendance: 2,054; Referee: (Serbia) Momčilo Marković

14 March 2020 26	Spartak	0–0	Vojvodina	Subotica
16:00		Report		Stadium: Subotica City Stadium; Attendance: 0 Referee: (Serbia) Nenad Minaković

29 May 2020 27	Vojvodina	1–1	Čukarički	Novi Sad
17:00	Bojić 13'	Report	Tedić 76' (pen.)	Stadium: Karađorđe Stadium; Attendance: 0 Referee: (Serbia) Miloš Đorđić

6 June 2020 28	Javor Ivanjica	1–3	Vojvodina	Ivanjica
14:00	Zvekanov 82'	Report	Zukić 56', 68'; Piščević 80' (o.g.)	Stadium: Ivanjica Stadium; Attendance: 500; Referee: (Serbia) Srđan Jovanović

14 June 2020 29	Inđija	2–0	Vojvodina	Inđija
14:00	Bastajić 23'; Purtić 90'	Report		Stadium: Inđija Stadium; Attendance: 620; Referee: (Serbia) Srđan Jovanović

19 June 2020 30	Vojvodina	1–0	Partizan	Novi Sad
19:00	Čović 14' (pen.)	Report		Stadium: Karađorđe Stadium; Attendance: 3,278; Referee: (Serbia) Miloš Đorđić

=== Serbian Cup ===
25 September 2019 Round of 32	Zlatibor	1–4	Vojvodina	Čajetina
15:30	Nedeljković 80' (pen.)	Report	Kokir 8'; Bojić 27'; Stojković 55'; Zukić 86'	Stadium: Stadion Švajcarija; Attendance: 250; Referee: (Serbia) Danilo Grujić

23 October 2019 Round of 16	Vojvodina	4–0	Sinđelić Beograd	Novi Sad
18:00	Korkhovoy 5' (o.g.); Zukić 35' (pen.), 57'; Đurić 81'	Report		Stadium: Karađorđe Stadium; Attendance: 512; Referee: (Serbia) Milan Stefanović

3 June 2020 Quarter-finals	Vojvodina	0–0 (5–4 p)	Mladost Lučani	Novi Sad
20:00		Report		Stadium: Karađorđe Stadium; Attendance: 0 Referee: (Serbia) Danilo Grujić

10 June 2020 Semi-finals	Čukarički	0–1	Vojvodina	Belgrade
17:00		Report	Čović 31'	Stadium: Čukarički Stadium; Attendance: 1,520; Referee: (Serbia) Danilo Grujić

24 June 2020 Final	Vojvodina	2–2 (4–2 p)	Partizan	Niš
19:00	Vukadinović 38'; Bojić 56'	Report	Stevanović 80'; S. Pavlović 90+6'	Stadium: Čair Stadium; Attendance: 5,100; Referee: (Serbia) Danilo Grujić

== Statistics ==
=== Squad statistics ===
No.	Pos	Nat	Player	Total		SuperLiga		Cup	
No.	Pos	Nat	Player	Apps	Goals	Apps	Goals	Apps	Goals
Goalkeepers
1	GK	(Serbia) SRB	Emil Rockov	30	0	27	0	3	0
25	GK	(Serbia) SRB	Nikola Simić	6	0	3	0	3	0
32	GK	(Serbia) SRB	Nemanja Toroman	0	0	0	0	0	0
Defenders
3	DF	(Serbia) SRB	Mladen Devetak	23	1	21	1	2	0
5	DF	(Bosnia and Herzegovina) BIH	Siniša Saničanin	32	0	28	0	4	0
6	DF	(Romania) ROU	Constantin Nica	0	0	0	0	0	0
11	DF	(Serbia) SRB	Stefan Đorđević	10	0	7	0	3	0
15	DF	(Serbia) SRB	Nikola Andrić	10	0	7	0	3	0
20	DF	(Serbia) SRB	Đorđe Đurić	12	1	9	0	3	1
29	DF	(Croatia) CRO	Slavko Bralić	9	0	6	0	3	0
30	DF	(Serbia) SRB	Aranđel Stojković	32	3	27	2	5	1
Midfielders
6	MF	(Serbia) SRB	Mirko Topić	19	1	17	1	2	0
8	MF	(Serbia) SRB	Dejan Zukić	31	6	27	4	4	2
10	MF	(Serbia) SRB	Jovan Kokir	11	1	9	0	2	1
17	MF	(Serbia) SRB	Mihajlo Nešković	16	2	14	2	2	0
18	MF	(Montenegro) MNE	Nikola Drinčić	35	2	30	2	5	0
22	MF	(Serbia) SRB	Bogdan Mladenović	6	0	6	0	0	0
24	MF	(Serbia) SRB	Petar Bojić	32	7	28	5	4	2
90	MF	(Serbia) SRB	Miljan Vukadinović	12	3	11	2	1	1
Forwards
7	FW	(Serbia) SRB	Nemanja Čović	12	3	9	2	3	1
9	FW	(Serbia) SRB	Vukašin Bogdanović	1	0	1	0	0	0
23	FW	(Bosnia and Herzegovina) BIH	Momčilo Mrkaić	12	2	9	2	3	0
28	FW	(Serbia) SRB	Miodrag Gemović	26	3	23	3	3	0
80	FW	(Serbia) SRB	Ognjen Đuričin	26	3	24	3	2	0
Players transferred out during the season
2	DF	(Serbia) SRB	Milan Lazarević	0	0	0	0	0	0
11	DF	(Serbia) SRB	Nemanja Vučić	4	0	2	0	2	0
13	DF	(Serbia) SRB	Nikola Petković	4	0	3	0	1	0
33	DF	(Serbia) SRB	Ranko Veselinović	20	1	19	1	1	0
4	MF	(Serbia) SRB	Marko Đurišić	15	0	15	0	0	0
55	MF	(Slovenia) SLO	Željko Filipović	1	0	1	0	0	0
93	MF	(Nigeria) NGR	Eze Vincent Okeuhie	17	3	17	3	0	0
9	FW	(Serbia) SRB	Bojan Matić	19	9	18	9	1	0
22	FW	(Serbia) SRB	Nemanja Nikolić	12	3	9	3	3	0

Last updated: 1 July 2020
Source: Competitions

=== Goal scorers ===
Rank	No.	Pos	Nat	Name	SuperLiga	Serbian Cup	Total
1	9	FW	(Serbia)	Bojan Matić	9	0	9
2	24	MF	(Serbia)	Petar Bojić	5	2	7
3	8	MF	(Serbia)	Dejan Zukić	3	3	6
4	90	MF	(Serbia)	Miljan Vukadinović	2	1	3
4	30	DF	(Serbia)	Aranđel Stojković	2	1	3
4	28	FW	(Serbia)	Miodrag Gemović	3	0	3
4	80	FW	(Serbia)	Ognjen Đuričin	3	0	3
4	7	FW	(Serbia)	Nemanja Čović	2	1	3
4	93	MF	(Nigeria)	Eze Vincent Okeuhie	3	0	3
4	22	FW	(Serbia)	Nemanja Nikolić	3	0	3
4	–	–	–	Own goal	2	1	3
5	23	FW	(Bosnia and Herzegovina)	Momčilo Mrkaić	2	0	2
5	18	MF	(Montenegro)	Nikola Drinčić	2	0	2
5	17	MF	(Serbia)	Mihajlo Nešković	2	0	2
6	3	DF	(Serbia)	Mladen Devetak	1	0	1
6	20	DF	(Serbia)	Đorđe Đurić	0	1	1
6	6	MF	(Serbia)	Mirko Topić	1	0	1
6	10	MF	(Serbia)	Jovan Kokir	0	1	1
6	33	DF	(Serbia)	Ranko Veselinović	1	0	1
Totals					47	11	58

Last updated: 1 July 2020

=== Clean sheets ===
Rank	No.	Pos	Nat	Name	SuperLiga	Serbian Cup	Total
1	1	GK	(Serbia)	Emil Rockov	12	2	14
2	25	GK	(Serbia)	Nikola Simić	1	1	2
Totals					13	3	16

Last updated: 1 July 2020

=== Disciplinary record ===
Number	Nation	Position	Name	SuperLiga		Serbian Cup		Total	
Number	Nation	Position	Name	Yellow card	Red card	Yellow card	Red card	Yellow card	Red card
3	(Serbia)	DF	Mladen Devetak	8	0	0	0	8	0
4	(Serbia)	MF	Marko Đurišić	4	0	0	0	4	0
5	(Bosnia and Herzegovina)	DF	Siniša Saničanin	8	0	2	0	10	0
7	(Serbia)	FW	Nemanja Čović	2	0	1	0	3	0
8	(Serbia)	MF	Dejan Zukić	2	0	0	0	2	0
9	(Serbia)	FW	Bojan Matić	5	0	0	0	5	0
10	(Serbia)	MF	Jovan Kokir	1	0	0	0	1	0
11	(Serbia)	DF	Stefan Đorđević	2	0	0	0	2	0
17	(Serbia)	MF	Mihajlo Nešković	2	0	0	0	2	0
18	(Montenegro)	MF	Nikola Drinčić	2	0	2	0	4	0
20	(Serbia)	DF	Đorđe Đurić	4	0	0	0	4	0
22	(Serbia)	FW	Nemanja Nikolić	1	0	0	0	1	0
23	(Bosnia and Herzegovina)	FW	Momčilo Mrkaić	2	0	0	0	2	0
24	(Serbia)	MF	Petar Bojić	4	0	1	0	5	0
25	(Serbia)	GK	Nikola Simić	1	0	0	1	1	1
28	(Serbia)	FW	Miodrag Gemović	3	0	0	0	3	0
29	(Croatia)	DF	Slavko Bralić	2	0	1	0	3	0
30	(Serbia)	DF	Aranđel Stojković	5	0	1	0	6	0
33	(Serbia)	DF	Ranko Veselinović	1	0	0	0	1	0
55	(Slovenia)	MF	Željko Filipović	1	0	0	0	1	0
80	(Serbia)	FW	Ognjen Đuričin	3	0	0	0	3	0
93	(Nigeria)	MF	Eze Vincent Okeuhie	4	0	0	0	4	0
			TOTALS	67	0	8	1	75	1

Last updated: 1 July 2020

=== Game as captain ===
Rank	No.	Pos	Nat	Name	SuperLiga	Serbian Cup	Total
1	33	DF	(Serbia)	Ranko Veselinović	19	1	20
2	18	MF	(Montenegro)	Nikola Drinčić	9	2	11
3	17	MF	(Serbia)	Mihajlo Nešković	1	1	2
4	1	GK	(Serbia)	Emil Rockov	1	1	2
Totals					30	5	35

Last updated: 1 July 2020

=== Attendances ===
	Matches	Attendances	Average	High	Low
SuperLiga	14	41,073	2,934	9,147	1,067
Serbian Cup	1	512	512	512	512
Total	15	40,561	2,773	9,147	512

* 1 match in SuperLiga and 1 match in Serbian Cup was played behind closed doors due to COVID-19 pandemic.

Last updated: 1 July 2020
