= Ognjen Đuričin =

Serbian footballer

Personal information
- Date of birth: 3 September 1995 (age 31)
- Place of birth: Zrenjanin, FR Yugoslavia
- Height: 1.74 m (5 ft 9 in)
- Position: Forward

Team information
- Current team: Mladost Novi Sad
- Number: 7

Youth career
- 2000–2008: Jedinstvo Novi Bečej
- 2008–2009: Bečej
- 2009–2010: Jedinstvo Novi Bečej
- 2010–2011: Bečej
- 2011–2012: Banat Zrenjanin

Senior career*
Years	Team	Apps	(Gls)
2012–2013	Banat Zrenjanin	0	(0)
2012–2013	→ Jedinstvo Novi Bečej (loan)	23	(3)
2013–2014	Senta	44	(10)
2015–2016	Zemun	8	(1)
2016	→ Srem Jakovo (loan)	5	(1)
2016	Munkfors	9	(11)
2016–2017	Bečej	45	(61)
2017	→ Åmål (loan)	4	(2)
2018	Spartak Subotica	18	(5)
2018–2021	Vojvodina	54	(6)
2021	Radnički Niš	15	(1)
2021–2022	IMT	20	(3)
2022–2023	Krupa	19	(9)
2023–	Mladost Novi Sad	30	(1)
- * Club domestic league appearances and goals as of 14 July 2024

Ognjen Đuričin (Serbian Cyrillic: Огњен Ђуричин; born 3 September 1995) is a Serbian footballer who plays as a forward for Mladost Novi Sad.

== Club career ==
=== Early years ===
Đuričin started playing football at the age of 5 with Jedinstvo Novi Bečej and later moved to Bečej as a pioneer. After a season with the club, he moved back to Jedinstvo, but returned to Bečej as a cadet. Finally, he joined Banat, where he completed his youth categories. As he did not make any official appearance with the first team of Banat, Đuričin moved on loan to his home club Jedinstvo for the 2012–13 season. Scoring 3 goals on 23 matches as a bonus player in the Vojvodina League East, he helped the team to make promotion in the Serbian League Vojvodina. Next the end of a season, Đuričin left the club. In summer 2013, Đuričin joined the Serbian League Vojvodina side Senta. Playing with the club, Đuričin made 44 appearances and scored 10 goals until the end of 2014, helping the team to finish on the first place in mid-season 2014–15. At the beginning of 2015, Đuričin moved to Zemun, winning the Serbian League Belgrade for 2014–15 season. He also appeared as a loaned player with Srem Jakovo in early 2016, after which he moved to the Swedish side Munkfors where he scored 11 goals on 9 matches in the Swedish Football Division 4.

=== Bečej ===
In summer 2016, Đuričin rejoined Bečej for the first time in professional career. He made his debut for the club in the first fixture of the 2016–17 season against Budućnost Gložan. During the season, Đuričin scored 45 goals on 30 matches in the Vojvodina League North, helping the team to win the competition and make promotion to the Serbian League Vojvodina. He noted 3 hat-tricks including matches against Mladost Apatin in 6th fixture and Mladost Turija in 19th fixture where he scored 4 goals at each, as also the 11th fixture match against Tavankut. He also appeared in cup matches under Football Association of Vojvodina against Vojvodina Bačko Gradište, Srbobran, Bačka 1901 and Dinamo Pančevo.

After a one-month loan deal with Åmål, Đuričin returned to Bečej in summer 2017. At the beginning of new season Đuričin achieved 8 goals in 4 matches in the Serbian League Vojvodina, scoring double at each as well. Next he scored in matches against Radnički Sremska Mitrovica, and Bačka 1901, before a match against Cement Beočin in 9th fixture, when he scored a twice. He also scored in cup match under the football association of Vojvodina, against Potisje Kanjiža. Later he scored in matches against Bratstvo Prigrevica, Crvena Zvezda Novi Sad and Mladost Bački Jarak. Finally, he scored against Borac Sakule at the end of first half-season in the Serbian League Vojvodina for the 2017–18 campaign. In late 2017, Đuričin was elected as the best male athlete of the Bečej municipality.

=== Spartak Subotica ===
During November 2017, Đuričin made deal about future transfer to the Serbian SuperLiga club Spartak Subotica in the winter transfer window. The information was confirmed by the club's president, Dragan Simović, at the beginning of the next month. Đuričin joined new club in January 2018, passing the mid-season preparations. He scored in his first friendly match for new club in 1–1 draw to OFK Bačka on 18 January, after which he officially promoted as a new player next day. Đuričin made his official debut for new club in 23 fixture of the 2017–18 Serbian SuperLiga campaign, replacing Nemanja Glavčić in 75 minute of the match against Napredak Kruševac, played on 16 February 2018. For the rest of match, he played on the same place on the field, making an assist to Mile Savković for his second goal on the match. Đuričin started his first game on the field in the next fixture, against Red Star Belgrade, scoring a single goal in 2–1 defeat on 25 February 2018. Later, Đuričin also scored in three successive matches from 26 to 28 fixture, against Zemun, Radnički Niš and Rad. Finally, Đuričin scored and made an assist to Mile Savković in 3–1 victory over Radnik Surdulica in the last fixture match of the regular season. In April 2018, Đuričin signed his first professional contract, penning a deal that would keep him in Spartak Subotica until 2021.

Đuričin made his first continental appearance in the first leg of the First qualifying round for 2018–19 UEFA Europa League campaign, against Coleraine. He joined the game as a substitution for Bojan Čečarić in second half. He also started the second leg in 2–0 away victory. In the first match of the next round, played on 26 July 2018, Đuričin scored for 2–0 win against Sparta Prague.

=== Vojvodina ===
Following the Spartak's elimination from the UEFA Europa League qualifiers, Đuričin moved to Vojvodina. He signed a three-year deal with new club on 27 August 2018, choosing to wear number 23 jersey. Đuričin made his debut for new club on 2 December 2018, when he also scored in 1–4 home defeat against Red Star Belgrade.

=== Radnički Niš ===
On 13 January 2021 Đuričin signed a two-year deal with another Serbian SuperLiga club, Radnički Niš. He made his debut for new club on 6 February 2021, replacing Petar Ristić in 86 minute against Metalac.

== Style of play ==
Standing at 5 ft 8 1/2 inches (1.74 m), Đuričin is a right-legged footballer, who mainly operates as a forward, being capable of playing on multiple positions in attack. While with Bečej, Đuričin affirmed as a goal poacher, scoring 66 goals on 50 official matches for the club in all competitions. He is also awarded for the best scorer in the 2016–17 Vojvodina League North season, after which he continued playing in the Serbian League Vojvodina as a second striker, pairing with Mladen Kovačević for the first half of the 2017–18 campaign. During the period in lower ranks he was scouted by Spartak Subotica and joined the club to replace Emil Abaz, who left the club previously. However Đorđe Ivanović also left the club in the same transfer window, Đuričin promoted for his successor in the first squad as a second striker. Đuričin debuted in Serbian top tier as an attacking midfielder. He is also an accurate penalty taker. Due to his football development, Đuričin was compared to Jamie Vardy by Serbian media in early 2018.

== Career statistics ==
As of 1 June 2022

Appearances and goals by club, season and competition
Club	Season	League			Cup		Continental		Other		Total	
Club	Season	Division	Apps	Goals	Apps	Goals	Apps	Goals	Apps	Goals	Apps	Goals
Jedinstvo Novi Bečej (loan)	2012–13	Vojvodina League East	23	3	—		—		—		23	3
Senta	2013–14	Serbian League Vojvodina	30	6	—		—		—		30	6
Senta	2014–15	Serbian League Vojvodina	14	4	—		—		—		14	4
Senta	Total		44	10	—		—		—		44	10
Zemun	2014–15	Serbian League Belgrade	5	1	—		—		—		5	1
Zemun	2015–16	Serbian First League	3	0	2 (Note: Including preliminary round match against Jedinstvo Užice)	0	—		—		5	0
Zemun	Total		8	1	2	0	—		—		10	1
Srem Jakovo (loan)	2015–16	Serbian League Belgrade	5	1	—		—		—		5	1
Munkfors	2016	Division 4	9	11	—		—		—		9	11
Bečej	2016–17	Vojvodina League North	30	45	—		—		4 (Note: Including Vojvodina FA Cup matches against Vojvodina Bačko Gradište, Srbobran, Bačka 1901 and Dinamo Pančevo)	4	34	49
Bečej	2017–18	Serbian League Vojvodina	15	16	—		—		1 (Note: Including Vojvodina FA Cup match against Potisje Kanjiža)	1	16	17
Bečej	Total		45	61	—		—		5	5	50	66
Åmål (loan)	2017	Division 3	4 (Note: Including matches against Karlskoga FF, Eskilstuna, Sunne & Ölme)	2	—		—		1 (Note: Including Dalslands Sparbank Cup match against Eds FF)	1	5	3
Spartak Subotica	2017–18	Serbian SuperLiga	15	5	—		—		—		15	5
Spartak Subotica	2018–19	Serbian SuperLiga	3	0	—		6 (Note: All matches played in the 2018–19 UEFA Europa League qualifying phase and play-off round)	1	—		9	1
Spartak Subotica	Total		18	5	—		6	1	—		24	6
Vojvodina	2018–19	Serbian SuperLiga	21	1	3	2	—		—		24	3
Vojvodina	2019–20	Serbian SuperLiga	24	3	2	0	—		—		26	3
Vojvodina	2020–21	Serbian SuperLiga	9	2	1	0	1	0	—		11	2
Vojvodina	Total		54	6	6	2	1	0	—		61	8
Radnički Niš	2020–21	Serbian SuperLiga	14	1	0	0	—		—		14	1
IMT	2021–22	Serbian First League	20	3	0	0	—		—		20	3
Career total			244	104	8	2	7	1	6	6	265	113

== Personal life ==
Born in Zrenjanin, Đuričin originating from Novi Bečej which is about 40 kilometers away. His paternal grandfather, Stevan "Bapa" Đuričin, also played football as a defender with Proleter Zrenjanin and Jedinstvo Novi Bečej. Đuričin is nicknamed "The int from Tisza".

== Honours ==
Jedinstvo Novi Bečej

- Vojvodina League East: 2012–13

Zemun

- Serbian League Belgrade: 2014–15

Bečej

- Vojvodina League North: 2016–17
- Serbian League Vojvodina: 2017–18

Vojvodina

- Serbian Cup: 2019–20
