= Marko Đurišić (footballer) =

Serbian footballer

Personal information
- Date of birth: 17 July 1997 (age 29)
- Place of birth: Belgrade, FR Yugoslavia
- Height: 1.80 m (5 ft 11 in)
- Position: Defensive midfielder

Team information
- Current team: Mornar
- Number: 8

Youth career
- RFK Novi Sad
- –2016: Vojvodina

Senior career*
Years	Team	Apps	(Gls)
2016–2017	Vojvodina	3	(0)
2016–2017	→ Proleter Novi Sad (loan)	29	(2)
2017–2018	Mačva Šabac	7	(0)
2018–2019	Dinamo Vranje	25	(0)
2019	Vojvodina	15	(0)
2020–2021	Riga	34	(1)
2022	Voždovac	23	(0)
2022–2023	Radnički Niš	12	(0)
2023	Birkirkara	4	(0)
2024–	Mornar	77	(6)
- * Club domestic league appearances and goals as of 17 June 2026

Marko Đurišić (Serbian Cyrillic: Марко Ђуришић; born 17 July 1997) is a Serbian professional footballer who plays as a defensive midfielder for Mornar.

== Club career ==
=== Vojvodina ===
He made his Serbian SuperLiga debut for Vojvodina on 14 August 2016 in 4:0 home win against Javor.

== Career statistics ==
=== Club ===
As of 20 March 2020

Appearances and goals by club, season and competition
Club	Season	League			Cup		Continental		Other		Total	
Club	Season	Division	Apps	Goals	Apps	Goals	Apps	Goals	Apps	Goals	Apps	Goals
Proleter Novi Sad (loan)	2015–16	Serbian First League	10	1	—		—		—		10	1
Proleter Novi Sad (loan)	2016–17	Serbian First League	19	1	1	0	—		—		20	1
Proleter Novi Sad (loan)	Total		29	2	1	0	—		—		30	2
Vojvodina	2016–17	Serbian SuperLiga	3	0	0	0	1	0	—		4	0
Mačva Šabac	2017–18	Serbian SuperLiga	7	0	1	0	—		—		8	0
Dinamo Vranje	2018–19	Serbian SuperLiga	25	0	1	0	—		—		26	0
Vojvodina	2019–20	Serbian SuperLiga	16	0	0	0	—		—		16	0
Riga	2020	Latvian Higher League	–	–	–	–	–	–	–	–	0	0
Career total			80	2	3	0	1	0	—		84	2
