= Nenad Lukić (footballer, born 1992) =

Serbian footballer

Personal information
- Full name: Nenad Lukić
- Date of birth: 2 September 1992 (age 34)
- Place of birth: Sremska Mitrovica, FR Yugoslavia
- Height: 1.85 m (6 ft 1 in)
- Position: Forward

Team information
- Current team: Voždovac
- Number: 27

Youth career
- Partizan

Senior career*
Years	Team	Apps	(Gls)
2010	Teleoptik	22	(3)
2011	Lokomotiv Plovdiv	13	(0)
2012	Rad	0	(0)
2013–2014	Donji Srem	34	(1)
2014–2015	Spartak Subotica	19	(0)
2015–2016	Bežanija	26	(15)
2016	Radnik Surdulica	6	(0)
2016	→ Zemun (loan)	12	(4)
2017	Zemun	15	(6)
2017	Rad	21	(1)
2018	Borac Čačak	11	(1)
2018	Inđija	22	(13)
2019–2021	TSC	85	(44)
2021–2023	Budapest Honvéd	61	(28)
2023	Changchun Yatai	8	(0)
2024	Győr	17	(3)
2025	Spartak Subotica	15	(0)
2025–	Voždovac	33	(14)

International career^{‡}
2008–2009	Serbia U17	5	(2)
2010–2011	Serbia U19	8	(6)
2021	Serbia	2	(0)
- * Club domestic league appearances and goals as of 14 May 2026 ‡ National team caps and goals as of 20 December 2021

Nenad Lukić (Serbian Cyrillic: Ненад Лукић; born 2 September 1992) is a Serbian professional footballer who plays as a forward for Voždovac.

== Club career ==
Born in Sremska Mitrovica, Lukić came through the youth system of Partizan, together with Darko Brašanac and Miloš Jojić, among others. He made his senior debut with their affiliated side Teleoptik in 2010. In the 2011 winter transfer window, Lukić moved to Bulgarian club Lokomotiv Plovdiv. He returned to his homeland and signed with Rad in the summer of 2012. After failing to make an appearance with the Belgrade side, Lukić switched to Donji Srem in the 2013 winter transfer window.

In the summer of 2014, Lukić signed with Spartak Subotica. He subsequently joined Bežanija in the summer of 2015. After becoming the Serbian First League top scorer in 2015–16, Lukić secured a move to Serbian SuperLiga side Radnik Surdulica. He was later loaned to Zemun during the same transfer window, before signing with the club on a permanent basis in February 2017.

In the summer of 2017, Lukić returned to Rad, but would move to Borac Čačak in the 2018 winter transfer window. He subsequently joined Inđija in the summer of 2018.

In the 2019 winter transfer window, Lukić was acquired by ambitious FK TSC. He scored nine goals in 15 games until the end of the season, helping the club win the Serbian First League and gain promotion to the Serbian SuperLiga for the first time in history. In the club's debut appearance in the top flight, Lukić became the league's joint top scorer with 16 goals, helping his team to a fourth-place finish to secure a spot in the UEFA Europa League next season.

In July 2021, Lukić moved abroad for the second time and signed with Hungarian club Budapest Honvéd.

On 10 July 2023, Budapest Honvéd announced that Lukić would be transferring to Chinese Super League club Changchun Yatai.

On 4 January 2024, Lukić joined Nemzeti Bajnokság II club Győr on a one-and-a-half-year contract.

== International career ==
At international level, Lukić represented Serbia at the 2011 UEFA European Under-19 Championship, as the team was eliminated in the semi-finals. He was previously the team's top scorer during the qualification campaign for the final tournament with six goals in five games.

In January 2021, Lukić was capped twice for Serbia at full level, appearing in two friendlies.

== Career statistics ==
=== Club ===
As of match played 24 May 2025

Appearances and goals by club, season and competition
Club	Season	League			Cup		Continental		Total	
Club	Season	Division	Apps	Goals	Apps	Goals	Apps	Goals	Apps	Goals
Teleoptik	2009–10	Serbian First League	8	0	0	0	—		8	0
Teleoptik	2010–11	Serbian First League	14	3	2	0	—		16	3
Teleoptik	Total		22	3	2	0	—		24	3
Lokomotiv Plovdiv	2010–11	Bulgarian First League	3	0	0	0	—		3	0
Lokomotiv Plovdiv	2011–12	Bulgarian First League	10	0	0	0	—		10	0
Lokomotiv Plovdiv	Total		13	0	0	0	—		13	0
Rad	2012–13	Serbian SuperLiga	0	0	0	0	—		0	0
Donji Srem	2012–13	Serbian SuperLiga	12	0	0	0	—		12	0
Donji Srem	2013–14	Serbian SuperLiga	22	1	3	1	—		25	2
Donji Srem	Total		34	1	3	1	—		37	2
Spartak Subotica	2014–15	Serbian SuperLiga	19	0	3	1	—		22	1
Bežanija	2015–16	Serbian First League	26	15	1	0	—		27	15
Radnik Surdulica	2016–17	Serbian SuperLiga	6	0	0	0	—		6	0
Zemun	2016–17	Serbian First League	27	10	1	0	—		28	10
Rad	2017–18	Serbian SuperLiga	21	1	2	0	—		23	1
Borac Čačak	2017–18	Serbian SuperLiga	11	1	0	0	—		11	1
Inđija	2018–19	Serbian First League	22	13	0	0	—		22	13
TSC	2018–19	Serbian First League	15	9	0	0	—		15	9
TSC	2019–20	Serbian SuperLiga	30	16	2	0	—		32	16
TSC	2020–21	Serbian SuperLiga	38	18	3	2	2	1	43	21
TSC	2021–22	Serbian SuperLiga	2	1	0	0	—		2	1
TSC	Total		85	44	5	2	2	1	92	47
Budapest Honvéd	2021–22	Nemzeti Bajnokság I	32	15	3	2	—		35	17
Budapest Honvéd	2022–23	Nemzeti Bajnokság I	29	13	2	0	—		31	13
Budapest Honvéd	Total		61	28	5	2	—		66	30
Changchun Yatai	2023	Chinese Super League	8	0	1	0	—		9	0
Győr	2023–24	Nemzeti Bajnokság II	13	2	—		—		13	2
Győr	2024–25	Nemzeti Bajnokság I	4	1	—		—		4	1
Győr	Total		17	3	—		—		17	3
Spartak Subotica	2024–25	Serbian SuperLiga	15	0	1	0	—		16	0
Career total			387	119	24	6	2	1	413	126

=== International ===
As of 20 December 2021

Appearances and goals by national team and year
National team	Year	Apps	Goals
Serbia	2021	2	0
Total		2	0

== Honours ==
TSC

- Serbian First League: 2018–19

Individual

- Serbian SuperLiga Top Scorer: 2019–20
- Serbian SuperLiga Player of the Week: 2020–21 (Round 9, Round 11)
