= Nikola Simić (footballer, born 1996) =

Serbian footballer

Personal information
- Full name: Nikola Simić
- Date of birth: 21 December 1996 (age 29)
- Place of birth: Belgrade, FR Yugoslavia
- Height: 1.92 m (6 ft 4 in)
- Position: Goalkeeper

Team information
- Current team: TSC
- Number: 1

Senior career*
Years	Team	Apps	(Gls)
2014–2016	Bežanija	0	(0)
2016	Srem Jakovo	7	(0)
2016–2018	Sinđelić Beograd	42	(0)
2018–2023	Vojvodina	45	(0)
2023–	TSC	43	(0)
- * Club domestic league appearances and goals as of 13 June 2026

Nikola Simić (Serbian Cyrillic: Никола Симић; born 21 December 1996) is a Serbian professional footballer who plays as a goalkeeper for TSC.

== Club career ==
=== Vojvodina ===
On 18 July 2018 Simić signed a three-year deal with Vojvodina. He had his debut for the club on 2 September 2018, replacing Emil Rockov in 32nd minute of 4:1 home defeat against Red Star Belgrade.

== Career statistics ==
As of 30 June 2023

Club	Season	League			Cup		Continental		Total	
Club	Season	Division	Apps	Goals	Apps	Goals	Apps	Goals	Apps	Goals
Bežanija	2014–15	Serbian First League	0	0	0	0	—		0	0
Bežanija	2015–16	Serbian First League	0	0	0	0	—		0	0
Bežanija	Total		0	0	0	0	—		0	0
Srem Jakovo	2015–16	Serbian League Belgrade	7	0	0	0	—		7	0
Sinđelić Beograd	2016–17	Serbian First League	16	0	1	0	—		17	0
Sinđelić Beograd	2017–18	Serbian First League	26	0	0	0	—		26	0
Sinđelić Beograd	Total		42	0	1	0	—		43	0
Vojvodina	2018–19	Serbian SuperLiga	3	0	0	0	—		3	0
Vojvodina	2019–20	Serbian SuperLiga	3	0	3	0	—		6	0
Vojvodina	2020–21	Serbian SuperLiga	18	0	0	0	0	0	18	0
Vojvodina	2021–22	Serbian SuperLiga	18	0	0	0	4	0	22	0
Vojvodina	2022–23	Serbian SuperLiga	3	0	3	0	—		6	0
Vojvodina	Total		45	0	6	0	4	0	55	0
Career total			94	0	7	0	4	0	105	0

== Honours ==
Vojvodina

- Serbian Cup: 2019–20
