= Mihajlo Nešković =

Serbian footballer

Personal information
- Date of birth: 9 February 2000 (age 26)
- Place of birth: Šid, FR Yugoslavia
- Height: 1.77 m (5 ft 10 in)
- Positions: Winger; attacking midfielder

Team information
- Current team: TSC
- Number: 11

Youth career
- Radnički Šid
- –2016: Vojvodina

Senior career*
| Years | Team | Apps | (Gls) |
| 2016–2022 | Vojvodina | 64 | (3) |
| 2020–2021 | → Inđija (loan) | 35 | (4) |
| 2022–2024 | Voždovac | 58 | (7) |
| 2024–2026 | Sepsi OSK | 46 | (2) |
| 2026 | → Budućnost (loan) | 10 | (0) |
| 2026– | TSC | 6 | (0) |

International career
| 2016–2017 | Serbia U17 | 13 | (0) |
| 2017 | Serbia U18 | 1 | (0) |
| 2018–2019 | Serbia U19 | 14 | (1) |
| 2020–2021 | Serbia U21 | 3 | (0) |
- * Club domestic league appearances and goals as of 12 September 2026

Mihajlo Nešković (Serbian Cyrillic: Михајло Нешковић; born 9 February 2000) is a Serbian professional footballer who plays as winger or an attacking midfielder for Serbian First League club TSC.

== Club career ==
On 21 October 2016, Nešković, made his debut for Vojvodina, in 3–1 home win against Voždovac. In June 2017, he signed his first professional contract, penning a three-year deal with the club.

After six years in Vojvodina, on 13 September 2022 Nešković signed for Voždovac. He signed a two-year deal with the club.

== Career statistics ==
As of 12 September 2026

Appearances and goals by club, season and competition
| Club | Season | League | | | National cup (Note: Includes Serbian Cup, Cupa României) | | Continental | | Other | | Total | |
| Club | Season | Division | Apps | Goals | Apps | Goals | Apps | Goals | Apps | Goals | Apps | Goals |
|---|---|---|---|---|---|---|---|---|---|---|---|---|
| Vojvodina | 2016–17 | Serbian SuperLiga | 4 | 0 | — | | — | | — | | 4 | 0 |
| Vojvodina | 2017–18 | Serbian SuperLiga | 9 | 0 | 1 | 0 | — | | — | | 10 | 0 |
| Vojvodina | 2018–19 | Serbian SuperLiga | 13 | 0 | 0 | 0 | — | | — | | 13 | 0 |
| Vojvodina | 2019–20 | Serbian SuperLiga | 14 | 2 | 2 | 0 | — | | — | | 16 | 2 |
| Vojvodina | 2020–21 | Serbian SuperLiga | 0 | 0 | 0 | 0 | 0 | 0 | — | | 0 | 0 |
| Vojvodina | 2021–22 | Serbian SuperLiga | 17 | 1 | 3 | 0 | 0 | 0 | — | | 20 | 1 |
| Vojvodina | 2022–23 | Serbian SuperLiga | 7 | 0 | 0 | 0 | — | | — | | 7 | 0 |
| Vojvodina | Total | | 64 | 3 | 6 | 0 | 0 | 0 | — | | 70 | 3 |
| Inđija (loan) | 2020–21 | Serbian SuperLiga | 35 | 4 | 1 | 0 | — | | — | | 36 | 4 |
| Voždovac | 2022–23 | Serbian SuperLiga | 23 | 2 | 1 | 0 | — | | — | | 24 | 2 |
| Voždovac | 2023–24 | Serbian SuperLiga | 35 | 5 | 1 | 1 | — | | — | | 36 | 6 |
| Voždovac | Total | | 58 | 7 | 2 | 1 | — | | — | | 60 | 8 |
| Sepsi OSK | 2024–25 | Liga I | 35 | 2 | 2 | 0 | — | | — | | 37 | 2 |
| Sepsi OSK | 2025–26 | Liga II | 11 | 0 | 1 | 0 | — | | — | | 12 | 0 |
| Sepsi OSK | Total | | 46 | 2 | 3 | 0 | — | | — | | 49 | 2 |
| Budućnost (loan) | 2025–26 | Montenegrin First League | 10 | 0 | — | | — | | — | | 10 | 0 |
| TSC | 2026–27 | Serbian First League | 6 | 0 | 0 | 0 | — | | — | | 6 | 0 |
| Career total | | | 219 | 16 | 12 | 1 | 0 | 0 | — | | 231 | 17 |

== Honours ==
Vojvodina

- Serbian Cup: 2019–20

Individual

- Serbian SuperLiga Player of the Week: 2023–24 (Round 17)
