= Nemanja Milojević =

Greek footballer

Personal information
- Full name: Nemanja Milojević
- Date of birth: 23 February 1998 (age 28)
- Place of birth: Athens, Greece
- Height: 1.83 m (6 ft 0 in)
- Position: Winger

Team information
- Current team: Marko
- Number: 23

Youth career
- Čukarički

Senior career*
Years	Team	Apps	(Gls)
2015–2018	Čukarički	29	(3)
2018–2019	Vojvodina	35	(2)
2019–2020	Panionios	17	(1)
2020–2022	Voždovac	53	(3)
2022–2023	Kolubara	34	(4)
2023	Novi Pazar	12	(0)
2024–2025	Čukarički	27	(2)
2025–2026	Mladost Lučani	28	(3)
2026–	Marko	0	(0)

International career^{‡}
2016–2017	Greece U19	3	(0)
2019	Greece U21	5	(0)
- * Club domestic league appearances and goals as of 30 June 2026 ‡ National team caps and goals as of 14 October 2019

Nemanja Milojević (Serbian Cyrillic: Немања Милојевић, Greek: Νεμάνια Μιλόγεβιτς; born 23 February 1998) is a Greek professional footballer who plays as a winger for Super League Greece 2 club Marko.

Born in Athens, the capital of Greece where his father Vladan Milojević was playing for Panathinaikos, Nemanja represented Greece under-19 level. He also holds both Greek and Serbian citizenship.

== Club career ==
=== Čukarički ===
As a product of FK Čukarički youth academy, Milojević signed his first professional contract with the club in December 2015 along with several other teammates from the class, being assigned number 56 jersey. He continued playing with the youth team, enjoying great success as a member of a generation which won the Serbian youth league and promotion in 2016–17 UEFA Youth League.

During the 2016–17 Serbian SuperLiga campaign, Milojević trained with the first squad, but without official matches in the first half-season. Previously, he changed his squad number to 54. Milojević made his debut for the first team of FK Čukarički under coach Nenad Lalatović in a Serbian Cup match against Sloboda Užice, played on 5 April 2017. Shortly after he came on as a substitute, he scored his first senior goal in official match. He made his first start on 33rd matchday of the 2016–17 season, against Metalac Gornji Milanovac.

In summer 2017, Milojević became a fully senior player and was assigned squad number 20. At the beginning of the 2017–18 Serbian SuperLiga season, he was elected for vice-captain behind Petar Bojić. During the first half-season in the domestic football competition, he scored in home victories against Voždovac, Vojvodina and Rad. In the mid-season, he refused to sign a new contract with the club. Milojević left the club as a free agent after the end of season.

=== Vojvodina ===
After the end of the 2017–18 Serbian SuperLiga campaign and his contract with former club, it was announced Vojvodina expressed an interest in Milojević. On 18 June 2018, Milojević officially joined new club, penning a three-year deal.

=== Panionios ===
On 5 August 2019, he signed a three-year contract with Super League Greece club Panionios.

=== Voždovac ===
On 18 September 2020, he signed a contract with Serbian SuperLiga club Voždovac.

=== Marko ===
On 30 June 2026 he was signed by the Super League Greece 2 side Marko.

== International career ==
In early years of his career, Milojević had been called into the Serbia national under-17 football team. He also played for Serbian under-18 level, in friendly matches against Bosnia and Herzegovina in 2016. Later, Nemanja represented Greece under-19 level between 2016 and 2017. In March 2018, Milojević was invited to Greece under-21 level under coach Antonios Nikopolidis. He made his debut for Greece under-21 national team in 4–3 friendly game away loss to Slovakia.

== Career statistics ==
As of 5 October 2021

Appearances and goals by club, season and competition
Club	Season	League			Cup		Continental		Other		Total	
Club	Season	Division	Apps	Goals	Apps	Goals	Apps	Goals	Apps	Goals	Apps	Goals
Čukarički	2015–16	Serbian SuperLiga	0	0	0	0	0	0	—		0	0
Čukarički	2016–17	Serbian SuperLiga	4	0	1	1	0	0	—		5	1
Čukarički	2017–18	Serbian SuperLiga	25	3	3	0	—		—		28	3
Čukarički	Total		29	3	4	1	0	0	—		33	4
Vojvodina	2018–19	Serbian SuperLiga	35	2	3	1	—		—		38	3
Panionios	2019–20	Super League Greece	17	1	3	0	—		—		20	1
Voždovac	2020–21	Serbian SuperLiga	23	1	3	0	—		—		26	1
Voždovac	2021–22	Serbian SuperLiga	7	1	0	0	—		—		7	1
Career total			111	8	13	2	0	0	—		124	10
