= Nikola Petković =

Nikola Petković may refer to:

- Nikola Petković (footballer, born 1986), Serbian-Chinese football centre-back
- Nikola Petković (footballer, born 1996), Serbian football midfielder for Mura
- Nikola Petković (footballer, born 2003), Serbian football defensive midfielder for Crown Legacy
