= Filip Pejović =

Serbian footballer

Personal information
- Date of birth: 26 June 1982 (age 44)
- Place of birth: Šabac, SFR Yugoslavia
- Height: 1.80 m (5 ft 11 in)
- Position: Right-back

Youth career
- Mačva Šabac

Senior career*
Years	Team	Apps	(Gls)
2001–2007	Mačva Šabac	105	(6)
2004	→ Radnički Stobex (loan)	9	(3)
2008	Trélissac		
2008–2021	Mačva Šabac	371	(16)

Managerial career
- 2022: Mačva Šabac (a.i.)
- * Club domestic league appearances and goals

Filip Pejović (Serbian Cyrillic: Филип Пејовић; born 26 June 1982) is a Serbian retired footballer who played as a defender.

A product of Mačva Šabac, Pejović spent over 25 years at the club, including both junior and senior days.

== Career ==
Pejović started out at his hometown club Mačva Šabac. He was loaned to Radnički Stobex in the 2003–04 winter transfer window. In the 2007–08 winter break, Pejović moved abroad to France and joined CFA 2 side Trélissac. He returned to Mačva Šabac in the summer of 2008. In the 2016–17 season, Pejović captained the team that won promotion to the Serbian SuperLiga for the first time in history.

== Statistics ==
Club	Season	League	
Club	Season	Apps	Goals
Mačva Šabac	2001–02		
Mačva Šabac	2002–03	0	0
Mačva Šabac	2003–04	4	1
Radnički Stobex (loan)	2003–04	9	3
Mačva Šabac	2004–05	31	1
Mačva Šabac	2005–06	36	2
Mačva Šabac	2006–07	22	1
Mačva Šabac	2007–08	12	1
Mačva Šabac	Total	105	6
Trélissac	2007–08		
Mačva Šabac	2008–09	25	1
Mačva Šabac	2009–10	26	0
Mačva Šabac	2010–11	27	2
Mačva Šabac	2011–12	27	1
Mačva Šabac	2012–13	28	3
Mačva Šabac	2013–14	30	5
Mačva Šabac	2014–15	30	1
Mačva Šabac	2015–16	25	0
Mačva Šabac	2016–17	29	1
Mačva Šabac	2017–18	34	0
Mačva Šabac	2018–19	36	1
Mačva Šabac	2019–20	1	0
Mačva Šabac	Total	318	15
Career total		432	24

== Honours ==
- Serbian First League: 2016–17
- Serbian League West: 2013–14, 2015–16
