= Nikola Vasiljević (footballer, born 1991) =

Serbian footballer

Personal information
- Full name: Nikola Vasiljević
- Date of birth: 30 June 1991 (age 35)
- Place of birth: Lazarevac, SFR Yugoslavia
- Height: 1.89 m (6 ft 2 in)
- Position: Centre-back

Team information
- Current team: Kolubara
- Number: 5

Youth career
- Kolubara

Senior career*
| Years | Team | Apps | (Gls) |
| 2009–2011 | Kolubara | 28 | (0) |
| 2012–2014 | OFK Beograd | 78 | (1) |
| 2015–2016 | Pandurii Târgu Jiu | 42 | (1) |
| 2017 | Tokushima Vortis | 21 | (0) |
| 2018 | BATE Borisov | 4 | (0) |
| 2019 | Vojvodina | 0 | (0) |
| 2020– | Kolubara | 92 | (6) |
- * Club domestic league appearances and goals as of 31 May 2024

Nikola Vasiljević (Serbian Cyrillic: Никола Васиљевић; born 30 June 1991) is a Serbian footballer who plays as a defender for Kolubara.

== Club career ==
=== Kolubara ===
He made his debut for Kolubara in the Serbian First League at the age of 17. In the 2008–09 season he played in 1 league match. In the 2009–10 season he played in 1 league match as well, versus Sloga Kraljevo. In the 2010–11 season, he played in 10 league matches. In the first half of the 2011–12 season he played in 16 league matches and 1 cup match.

=== OFK Beograd ===
He joined OFK Beograd at the beginning of 2012. In the second half of the 2011–12 season he played in 12 league matches. In the 2012–13 season he played in 21 league matches and 3 cup matches. He scored 1 goal against Sloboda Užice. After Marko Petković left for Red Star Belgrade, he became captain of OFK Beograd. He played 30 league matches in the 2012–13 season and also played in 4 cup matches.

=== Pandurii Târgu Jiu ===
Vasiljević signed a contract with Romanian club Pandurii Târgu Jiu for two and a half years on 21 January 2015.

== Career statistics ==
As of 1 July 2019

Appearances and goals by club, season and competition
| Club | Season | League | | | Cup | | Continental | | Other | | Total | |
| Club | Season | Division | Apps | Goals | Apps | Goals | Apps | Goals | Apps | Goals | Apps | Goals |
|---|---|---|---|---|---|---|---|---|---|---|---|---|
| Kolubara | 2008–09 | Serbian First League | 1 | 0 | — | | — | | — | | 1 | 0 |
| Kolubara | 2009–10 | Serbian First League | 1 | 0 | — | | — | | — | | 1 | 0 |
| Kolubara | 2010–11 | Serbian First League | 10 | 0 | 0 | 0 | — | | — | | 10 | 0 |
| Kolubara | 2011–12 | Serbian First League | 16 | 0 | 1 | 0 | — | | — | | 17 | 0 |
| Kolubara | Total | | 28 | 0 | 1 | 0 | — | | — | | 29 | 0 |
| OFK Beograd | 2011–12 | Serbian SuperLiga | 12 | 0 | 0 | 0 | — | | — | | 12 | 0 |
| OFK Beograd | 2012–13 | Serbian SuperLiga | 21 | 1 | 3 | 0 | — | | — | | 24 | 1 |
| OFK Beograd | 2013–14 | Serbian SuperLiga | 30 | 0 | 4 | 0 | — | | — | | 34 | 0 |
| OFK Beograd | 2014–15 | Serbian SuperLiga | 15 | 0 | 1 | 0 | — | | — | | 16 | 0 |
| OFK Beograd | Total | | 78 | 1 | 8 | 0 | — | | — | | 86 | 1 |
| Pandurii Târgu Jiu | 2014–15 | Liga I | 16 | 0 | 0 | 0 | — | | 3 | 0 | 19 | 0 |
| Pandurii Târgu Jiu | 2015–16 | Liga I | 10 | 1 | 0 | 0 | — | | — | | 10 | 1 |
| Pandurii Târgu Jiu | 2016–17 | Liga I | 16 | 0 | 1 | 0 | 2 | 0 | 1 | 0 | 20 | 0 |
| Pandurii Târgu Jiu | Total | | 42 | 1 | 1 | 0 | 2 | 0 | 4 | 0 | 49 | 1 |
| Tokushima Vortis | 2017 | J2 League | 21 | 0 | 0 | 0 | — | | — | | 21 | 0 |
| BATE Borisov | 2018 | Belarusian Premier League | 4 | 0 | 2 | 0 | — | | 1 | 0 | 7 | 0 |
| Vojvodina | 2019–20 | Serbian SuperLiga | 0 | 0 | 0 | 0 | — | | — | | 0 | 0 |
| Career total | | | 173 | 2 | 12 | 0 | 2 | 0 | 5 | 0 | 192 | 2 |

== Honours ==
BATE Borisov

- Belarusian Premier League: 2018
