= Emil Rockov =

Serbian footballer

Personal information
- Date of birth: 27 January 1995 (age 31)
- Place of birth: Novi Sad, FR Yugoslavia
- Height: 1.89 m (6 ft 2 in)
- Position: Goalkeeper

Youth career
- 2004–2006: Prof. Bolesnikov
- 2006–2014: Vojvodina

Senior career*
Years	Team	Apps	(Gls)
2013–2015	Vojvodina	0	(0)
2014–2015	→ Sloga Temerin (loan)	28	(0)
2015	→ Proleter Novi Sad (loan)	7	(0)
2016	Proleter Novi Sad	29	(0)
2017–2020	Vojvodina	114	(0)
2020–2024	Fehérvár	19	(0)
2022	→ Vojvodina (loan)	16	(0)
2024–2025	Sarajevo	10	(0)

International career
2019	Serbia	1	(0)
- * Club domestic league appearances and goals as of 8 January 2026

Emil Rockov (Serbian Cyrillic: Емил Роцков; born 27 January 1995) is a Serbian professional footballer who plays as a goalkeeper. He represented Serbia under-17 level and made his senior national debut in 2019.

== Club career ==
=== Vojvodina ===
Rockov started playing football at "Bolesnikov" football academy at the age of 9, where he has started growing up as a goalkeeper. Later, at the age of 11, he joined Vojvodina where he passed youth categories and joined the first team as a back-up choice during the 2013–14 Serbian SuperLiga season. In 2014, Rockov also signed his first professional contract. For the next season, after he overgrew youth team, he was loaned to Serbian League Vojvodina side Sloga Temerin, where he played mostly matches as a bonus player. In summer 2015, Rockov moved to Proleter Novi Sad. After he spent the first half-season as a loaned player under contract with Vojvodina, having split playing time with Nemanja Buzadžija, and playing 8 matches in total, Rockov joined Proleter as a single-player in the winter break off-season.

After he spent the whole year under contract with Proleter, Rockov returned to Vojvodina at the beginning of 2017 and signed a three-year contract with club. He made his debut for the first team of Vojvodina in the 22nd fixture match of the 2016–17 Serbian SuperLiga season, against Spartak Subotica, played on 19 February 2017, under coach Dragan Ivanović. During the game, Rockov neutralized several big chances for the opponent team, and he was also nominated for the man of the match on his first official appearance for the team. Rockov collected over 720 minutes without a conceded goal in the Serbian SuperLiga matches between May and August 2017, including 2016–17 and 2017–18 seasons. After four clean sheets he kept at the beginning of the season, Rockov had been beaten by Bojan Ostojić in 89 minute of the match against Partizan on 13 August 2017, for the first Vojvodina's lost game in the 2017–18 Serbian SuperLiga season. Despite the one ball in his goal, Rockov was elected for the man of the match. In the meantime, Rockov also made an assist to Joseph Bempah in 2–0 away victory over Borac Čačak on 9 August 2017. On 29 December 2017, Rockov signed a one-year-extension to his contract with the club. In May 2018, Rockov was elected for the best player of FK Vojvodina in the past season, by fans choice. On 18 September 2018, Rockov signed another one-year-extension to his contract with the club, until June 2022. In May 2019, Rockov, then a club captain, was elected for the best player of FK Vojvodina in the past season for the second consecutive time.

On 17 July 2020, Rockov joined Hungarian side Fehérvár FC.

On 20 January 2022, Rockov returned to Vojvodina on loan from Fehérvár until the end of the season.

On 19 June 2024, Rockov signed with Bosnian Premier League club Sarajevo.

== International career ==
He made his Serbia national football team debut on 10 October 2019 in a friendly against Paraguay. He substituted Predrag Rajković in the 89th minute.

== Personal life ==
Born in Novi Sad, Rockov grown up in the local neighborhood Telep. In his early years, Rockov trained Karate. Emil's parents are scientists. They are physicists by the profession, and his older sister completed a degree in English language. Rockov has also studied psychology at the University of Belgrade Faculty of Philosophy.

== Career statistics ==
=== Club ===
As of match played 10 May 2025

Appearances and goals by club, season and competition
Club	Season	League			National cup (Note: Includes Serbian Cup, Magyar Kupa)		Continental		Total	
Club	Season	Division	Apps	Goals	Apps	Goals	Apps	Goals	Apps	Goals
Sloga Temerin (loan)	2014–15	Serbian League Vojvodina	28	0	—		—		28	0
Proleter Novi Sad	2015–16	Serbian First League	22 (Note: Rockov spent the first half-season as a loaned player with 7 league appearances and 1 cup match, after which he joined the club permanently)	0	1	0	—		23	0
Proleter Novi Sad	2016–17	Serbian First League	14	0	0	0	—		14	0
Proleter Novi Sad	Total		36	0	1	0	—		37	0
Vojvodina	2016–17	Serbian SuperLiga	16	0	3	0	—		19	0
Vojvodina	2017–18	Serbian SuperLiga	36	0	2	0	2 (Note: Appearance(s) in UEFA Europa League)	0	40	0
Vojvodina	2018–19	Serbian SuperLiga	35	0	3	0	—		38	0
Vojvodina	2019–20	Serbian SuperLiga	27	0	3	0	—		30	0
Vojvodina	Total		114	0	11	0	2	0	127	0
Fehérvár	2020–21	Nemzeti Bajnokság I	18	0	1	0	0	0	19	0
Fehérvár	2021–22	Nemzeti Bajnokság I	0	0	0	0	0	0	0	0
Fehérvár	2022–23	Nemzeti Bajnokság I	1	0	1	0	1 (Note: Appearance(s) in UEFA Europa Conference League)	0	3	0
Fehérvár	2023–24	Nemzeti Bajnokság I	0	0	0	0	—		0	0
Fehérvár	Total		19	0	2	0	1	0	22	0
Vojvodina (loan)	2021–22	Serbian SuperLiga	16	0	2	0	—		18	0
Sarajevo	2024–25	Bosnian Premier League	10	0	0	0	4	0	14	0
Career total			223	0	16	0	7	0	246	0

== Honours ==
Vojvodina

- Serbian Cup: 2013–14, 2019–20

Sarajevo

- Bosnian Cup: 2024–25
