= Miodrag Gemović =

Serbian footballer

Personal information
- Full name: Miodrag Gemović
- Date of birth: 25 December 1994 (age 31)
- Place of birth: Šabac, FR Yugoslavia
- Height: 1.84 m (6 ft 1/2 in)
- Position: Forward

Team information
- Current team: Mačva Šabac
- Number: 33

Youth career
- Mačva Šabac

Senior career*
Years	Team	Apps	(Gls)
2010–2014	Mačva Šabac	40	(8)
2014–2016	Čukarički	0	(0)
2014–2015	→ Sinđelić Beograd (loan)	25	(4)
2015–2016	→ Zemun (loan)	27	(3)
2017–2019	Mačva Šabac	64	(5)
2019–2021	Vojvodina	58	(8)
2021–2022	Al-Khaleej	35	(2)
2022–2023	Al-Riyadh	32	(7)
2023–2024	Al-Jabalain	27	(1)
2025	Radnički Niš	14	(1)
2025–	Mačva Šabac	23	(1)
- * Club domestic league appearances and goals as of 14 May 2026

Miodrag Gemović (Serbian Cyrillic: Миодраг Гемовић; born 25 December 1994) is a Serbian professional footballer who plays as a forward for Mačva Šabac.

On 28 August 2021, Gemović joined Saudi Arabian club Al-Khaleej. On 14 June 2022, Gemović joined Al-Riyadh. On 8 June 2023, Gemović joined Al-Jabalain.

== Honours ==
Vojvodina

- Serbian Cup: 2019–20

Al-Khaleej'

- First Division: 2021–22

Individual

- Serbian SuperLiga Player of the Week: 2020–21 (Round 32)
