= Jovan Kokir =

Serbian footballer (born 2000)

Personal information
- Date of birth: 25 April 2000 (age 26)
- Place of birth: Belgrade, FR Yugoslavia
- Height: 1.78 m (5 ft 10 in)
- Position: Winger

Team information
- Current team: Dubočica
- Number: 42

Youth career
- Teleoptik
- Partizan

Senior career*
Years	Team	Apps	(Gls)
2018–2019	Partizan	0	(0)
2019	→ Teleoptik (loan)	15	(5)
2019–2020	Vojvodina	9	(0)
2020–2021	Metalac Gornji Milanovac	28	(0)
2021–2022	Žarkovo	25	(1)
2022–2024	RFK Novi Sad	36	(6)
2024	Inđija	11	(0)
2025–	Dubočica	20	(1)

International career
2016–2017	Serbia U17 (Note: Only official UEFA matches included)	5	(0)
- * Club domestic league appearances and goals as of 1 December 2025

Jovan Kokir (Serbian Cyrillic: Јован Кокир; born 25 April 2000) is a Serbian professional footballer who plays as a winger for Dubočica.

== Club career ==
=== Partizan ===
Kokir signed his first professional contract with Partizan on 1 September 2017, alongside Jovan Vlalukin, Svetozar Marković and Andrej Ilić. He was officially promoted to the senior squad the following year, being assigned the number 40 shirt.

==== Loan to Teleoptik ====
In early 2019, Kokir was loaned to Teleoptik until the end of the season.

=== Vojvodina ===
In summer 2019, Kokir signed a three-year deal with Vojvodina.

== International career ==
Kokir was selected by Perica Ognjenović to represent Serbia at the 2017 UEFA European Under-17 Championship.

== Career statistics ==
As of 25 June 2020

Club	Season	League			Cup		Continental		Other		Total	
Club	Season	Division	Apps	Goals	Apps	Goals	Apps	Goals	Apps	Goals	Apps	Goals
Partizan	2018–19	Serbian SuperLiga	0	0	0	0	0	0	—		0	0
Teleoptik (loan)	2018–19	Serbian First League	15	5	0	0	—		—		15	5
Vojvodina	2019–20	Serbian SuperLiga	9	0	2	1	—		—		11	1
Career total			24	5	2	1	0	0	—		26	6

== Honours ==
Vojvodina

- Serbian Cup: 2019–20
