= Stefan Mihajlović =

Serbian footballer

Personal information
- Date of birth: 24 June 1994 (age 32)
- Place of birth: Belgrade, FR Yugoslavia
- Height: 1.88 m (6 ft 2 in)
- Position: Striker

Youth career
- 2001–2012: Red Star Belgrade

Senior career*
Years	Team	Apps	(Gls)
2012–2014	Red Star Belgrade	7	(0)
2012	→ Sopot (loan)	10	(3)
2014	→ Sloboda Užice (loan)	13	(2)
2015	Rad	5	(0)
2015	Biel-Bienne	0	(0)
2016	Chiasso	16	(2)
2016–2017	Borac Čačak	30	(7)
2017–2018	Vojvodina	29	(4)
2018–2019	Rad	21	(1)
2019–2020	Radnički Niš	29	(15)
2020–2021	Guizhou Hengfeng	26	(5)
2022	Cangzhou Mighty Lions	5	(0)
2022	Radnički Niš	1	(0)
2023	Maziya		
2023	Tuzla City	1	(0)
2024	Radnički Beograd	1	(0)
- * Club domestic league appearances and goals as of 13 September 2022

Stefan Mihajlović (Serbian Cyrillic: Стефан Михајловић; born 24 June 1994) is a Serbian footballer who most recently played for Radnički Beograd.

He is the son of former Yugoslav international footballer Radmilo Mihajlović.

== Club career ==
Coach Aleksandar Janković invited Mihajlović, who at the time was a part of Red Star's youth squad, to travel to Turkey with the senior team for the 2012–13 winter break off-season.

Mihajlović, at the age of 17, played his first match with the Red Star Belgrade senior team in a friendly against Eyüpspor, during which he scored two goals. He made his professional debut for Red Star Belgrade on 9 March 2013 in a SuperLiga match against Novi Pazar.

Eventually, coach Janković was replaced by Ricardo Sá Pinto, who suspended Mihajlović in early April for missing practice without any excuse. However, the suspension was promptly removed after a friendly match with FK Jagodina's youth squad, during which Mihajlović scored a goal from a bicycle kick.

After he left Red Star Belgrade, Mihajlović spent some period without a club, before joining FK Rad. He also spent a period with Biel-Bienne and Chiasso in Swiss Challenge League, before he signed with Borac Čačak in summer 2016.

After a season with Borac, Mihajlović moved to Vojvodina on a three-year deal.

In the summer of 2018, he left Vojvodina and after 3 years came back to FK Rad. After a successful season in which he made 21 appearances and scored one goal, his contract in summer 2019 expired, and he signed with FK Radnički Niš.

== Career statistics ==
As of match played 31 December 2021.

Appearances and goals by club, season and competition
Club	Season	League			National Cup		Continental		Other		Total	
Club	Season	Division	Apps	Goals	Apps	Goals	Apps	Goals	Apps	Goals	Apps	Goals
Red Star Belgrade	2012–13	Serbian SuperLiga	3	0	0	0	—		—		3	0
Red Star Belgrade	2013–14	Serbian SuperLiga	1	0	1	0	2	0	—		4	0
Red Star Belgrade	Total		4	0	1	0	2	0	0	0	7	0
Sloboda Užice (loan)	2013–14	Serbian SuperLiga	13	2	0	0	—		—		13	2
Rad	2014–15	Serbian SuperLiga	4	0	0	0	—		—		4	0
Rad	2015–16	Serbian SuperLiga	1	0	0	0	—		—		5	0
Rad	Total		5	0	0	0	0	0	0	0	5	0
Chiasso	2015–16	Swiss Challenge League	16	2	0	0	—		—		16	2
Borac Čačak	2016–17	Serbian SuperLiga	30	7	3	0	—		—		33	7
Vojvodina	2017–18	Serbian SuperLiga	29	4	3	4	1	0	—		33	8
Rad	2018–19	Serbian SuperLiga	21	1	1	0	—		—		22	1
Radnički Niš	2019–20	Serbian SuperLiga	29	15	2	0	1	1	—		32	16
Guizhou Hengfeng	2020	China League One	3	0	1	0	—		—		4	0
Guizhou Hengfeng	2021	China League One	23	5	0	0	—		—		23	5
Guizhou Hengfeng	Total		26	5	1	0	0	0	0	0	27	5
Career total			173	36	11	4	4	1	0	0	188	41
