= Nikola Petković (footballer, born 1996) =

Serbian footballer

Personal information
- Date of birth: 23 September 1996 (age 30)
- Place of birth: Belgrade, FR Yugoslavia
- Height: 1.85 m (6 ft 1 in)
- Positions: Attacking midfielder; striker

Team information
- Current team: Žalgiris
- Number: 11

Youth career
- Partizan
- Čukarički
- Lokomotiva Beograd

Senior career*
Years	Team	Apps	(Gls)
2013–2018	Lokomotiva Beograd		(0)
2018–2020	Javor Ivanjica	77	(39)
2020–2022	Chambly	30	(5)
2022–2024	Mura	24	(3)
2024–	Žalgiris	50	(19)
- * Club domestic league appearances and goals as of 24 August 2026

Nikola Petković (Serbian Cyrillic: Никола Петковић; born 23 September 1996) is a Serbian professional footballer who plays for Lithuanian club FK Žalgiris. He can play as an attacking midfielder or striker.

== Career ==
Petković started his professional career with hometown Lokomotiva Beograd in the 2014–15 season. In the 2016–17 season, he was the top goalscorer of the fourth-tier Belgrade Zone League, helping the team to win the championship. He started the 2017–18 season with the club, only to sign a contract in the mid-season with top-tier Javor Ivanjica until the end of the 2020–21 season. In ten appearances in the 2017–18 Serbian SuperLiga, he scored one goal as Javor relegated to the second-tier Serbian First League. In the 2018–19 season, he emerged as club's leading scorer, finishing the season with 22 goals over 37 matches, which placed him as second top goalscorer of the 2018–19 Serbian First League. Javor Ivanjica gained promotion that season to the Serbian SuperLiga.

In the 2019–20 season of the Serbian top-tier Serbian SuperLiga, Petković continued with the good performances from the past season, scoring 10 goals in 17 games until 23 November 2019. In November 2019, Javor reportedly agreed with Partizan on his transfer in the winter's mid-season transfer window. However, the transfer was not realized and Petković continued playing for Javor in the second half of the season. He joined French team Chambly on 4 July 2020.

== Career statistics ==
As of 20 June 2020

Appearances and goals by club, season and competition
Club	Season	League			National cup		Continental		Other		Total	
Club	Season	Division	Apps	Goals	Apps	Goals	Apps	Goals	Apps	Goals	Apps	Goals
Javor Ivanjica	2017–18	Serbian SuperLiga	10	1	1	0	—	—	—	—	11	1
Javor Ivanjica	2018–19	Serbian First League	37	22	0	0	—	—	—	—	37	22
Javor Ivanjica	2019–20	Serbian SuperLiga	29	16	0	0	—	—	—	—	29	16
Javor Ivanjica	Total		76	39	1	0	0	0	0	0	77	39

== Honours ==
Individual

- Serbian SuperLiga top scorer: 2019–20 (shared)
