= Vanja Zvekanov =

Serbian footballer

Personal information
- Date of birth: 25 May 2000 (age 26)
- Place of birth: Subotica, Serbia, FR Yugoslavia
- Height: 1.86 m (6 ft 1 in)
- Position: Defensive midfielder

Team information
- Current team: Szeged-Csanád
- Number: 8

Youth career
- 2013-2018: Spartak Subotica
- 2018–2018: Genoa

Senior career*
Years	Team	Apps	(Gls)
2019–2022	Javor Ivanjica	66	(5)
2022–2024	Haladás	46	(1)
2024–2025	Mezőkövesd	31	(1)
2026–	Szeged-Csanád	14	(2)

International career
2017	Serbia U17	4	(0)
2018–2019	Serbia U19	9	(0)
- * Club domestic league appearances and goals as of 31 May 2026

Vanja Zvekanov (born 25 May 2000) is a Serbian professional footballer who plays as a defensive midfielder for Hungarian club Szeged-Csanád.

== Club career ==
=== Spartak Subotica ===
He continued the family tradition and started playing football at the age of four in FK Palić, where his father Zlatko was the coach. Then he moved to Spartak, where he was the captain of the cadets and a member of the Serbia national youth team.

=== Genoa ===
In March 2018, he signed a contract for Genoa C.F.C., which he chose instead of another Italian team, Parma Calcio 1913. He arrived in Italy as a teenager and made 27 appearances in Primavera. In Italy, he was called the "new Matić", and then he suffered an injury that prevented him from playing in Serie A, what was the plan of coach Davide Ballardini.

=== Javor Ivanjica ===
In the summer of 2019, he returned to Serbian football and got a lot of minutes in professional football in the Super League. As soon as he came he played ten games for Javor in the first season. In that period Zvekanov scored two goals and had one assist in the Super League

=== Haladás ===
In June 2022, Zvekanov joined Haladás in Hungary.

== International career ==
While playing for FC Spartak Subotica, Zvekanov played for the Serbia national U17 team, and then he also played for the Serbia national U19 team. In 2019, he was on the wider list of the Serbia national U21 team led by the coach Nenad Milovanović. He played with the national youth team in the qualifications for the European Championship in Northern Ireland, when they won a place for the elite round of qualifications in Italy.

== Career statistics ==
=== Club ===
As of 13 November 2020

Club	Season	League			Cup		Continental		Other		Total	
Club	Season	Division	Apps	Goals	Apps	Goals	Apps	Goals	Apps	Goals	Apps	Goals
Javor	2019–20	SuperLiga	10	2	1	0	—		—		11	2
Javor	2020–21	SuperLiga	13	1	0	0	—		—		13	1
Javor	Total		23	3	1	0	—		—		24	3
Career Totals			23	3	1	0	0	0	—		24	3

== Honours ==
- "Lajoš Vermeš" medal in Subotica in 2018. for sports feat of the year, proven football talent, persistence and going to Italian football.
