= Petar Bojić =

Serbian footballer

Personal information
- Date of birth: 4 September 1991 (age 35)
- Place of birth: Užice, SR Serbia, SFR Yugoslavia
- Height: 1.86 m (6 ft 1 in)
- Position: Attacking midfielder

Team information
- Current team: Mladost Lučani
- Number: 9

Youth career
- Sloga Požega
- 2007–2009: Sloboda Užice

Senior career*
Years	Team	Apps	(Gls)
2009–2010	Sloga Požega	15	(1)
2010–2012	Mladost Lučani	53	(7)
2012–2013	Napredak Kruševac	44	(11)
2014–2018	Čukarički	129	(15)
2019	Mladost Lučani	13	(2)
2019–2021	Vojvodina	56	(13)
2021–2023	Sepsi OSK	13	(1)
2022	→ Kolubara (loan)	14	(0)
2024–	Mladost Lučani	79	(11)
- * Club domestic league appearances and goals as of 13 June 2026

Petar Bojić (Serbian Cyrillic: Петар Бојић; born 4 September 1991) is a Serbian professional footballer who plays as a midfielder for Mladost Lučani.

== Club career ==
Bojić played for youth categories of Sloga Požega, and also spent 2 years with youth team of Sloboda Užice. Later he returned in Sloga Požega where he started professional career, and made 15 appearances and scored 1 goal.

=== Mladost Lučani ===
For two seasons in this club, he played 53 matches and scored 7 goals. He was player of the match when he scored 2 goals in away match against Sloga Kraljevo on Kraljevo City Stadium. That was the first home loss for Sloga Kraljevo in almost 2 years.

=== Napredak Kruševac ===
After great season in Mladost Lučani, he moved to Napredak Kruševac. He continued to play with fair form, and he is a valued player in team. He made his professional debut for Napredak Kruševac on 10 August 2013, in Jelen SuperLiga away match versus FK Jagodina. In December 2013, he moved to Čukarički.

=== Čukarički ===
After four years at FK Čukarički, Bojić left the club at the end of 2018.

=== Mladost Lučani ===
On 8 February 2019, Bojić joined FK Mladost Lučani on a contract for the rest of the season.

=== Vojvodina ===
On 1 July 2019, Bojić joined FK Vojvodina signing a 3 year contract.

== Career statistics ==
As of 8 May 2022

Appearances and goals by club, season and competition
Club	Season	League			Cup		Continental		Other		Total	
Club	Season	Division	Apps	Goals	Apps	Goals	Apps	Goals	Apps	Goals	Apps	Goals
Sloga Požega	2009–10	Serbian League West	15	1	—		—		—		15	1
Mladost Lučani	2010–11	Serbian First League	26	1	0	0	—		—		26	1
Mladost Lučani	2011–12	Serbian First League	27	6	0	0	—		—		27	6
Mladost Lučani	Total		53	7	0	0	—		—		53	7
Napredak Kruševac	2012–13	Serbian First League	31	10	0	0	—		—		31	10
Napredak Kruševac	2013–14	Serbian SuperLiga	13	1	1	1	—		—		14	2
Napredak Kruševac	Total		44	11	1	1	—		—		45	12
Čukarički	2013–14	Serbian SuperLiga	14	0	0	0	—		—		14	0
Čukarički	2014–15	Serbian SuperLiga	29	3	3	1	4	2	—		36	6
Čukarički	2015–16	Serbian SuperLiga	31	3	2	0	4	0	—		37	3
Čukarički	2016–17	Serbian SuperLiga	16	2	3	0	0	0	—		19	2
Čukarički	2017–18	Serbian SuperLiga	30	7	3	3	—		—		33	10
Čukarički	2018–19	Serbian SuperLiga	9	0	2	1	—		—		11	1
Čukarički	Total		129	15	13	5	8	2	—		150	22
Mladost Lučani	2018–19	Serbian SuperLiga	13	2	1	0	—		—		14	2
Vojvodina	2019–20	Serbian SuperLiga	28	5	4	2	—		—		32	7
Vojvodina	2020–21	Serbian SuperLiga	28	8	4	1	1 (Note: Appearances in UEFA Europa League)	1	—		33	10
Vojvodina	Total		56	13	8	3	1	1	—		65	17
Sepsi OSK	2021–22	Liga I	13	1	1	0	2	0	—		16	1
Kolubara (loan)	2021–22	Serbian SuperLiga	14	0	—		—		—		14	0
Career total			337	50	24	9	11	3	—		372	62

== Honours ==
Napredak Kruševac

- Prva Liga Srbije: 2012–13

Čukarički

- Kup Srbije: 2014–15

Vojvodina

- Kup Srbije: 2019–20

Sepsi OSK

- Cupa României: 2021–22
- Supercupa României: 2022
