= 2009–10 Serbian League West =

Serbian League West
- Season: 2009–10

Serbian League West is a section of the Serbian League, Serbia's third-tier football league. Teams from the western part of Serbia are in this section of the league. The other sections are Serbian League East, Serbian League Vojvodina, and Serbian League Belgrade.

== League table ==
| Pos | Team | Pld | W | D | L | GF | GA | GD | Pts | Promotion or relegation |
|---|---|---|---|---|---|---|---|---|---|---|
| 1 | Šumadija Radnički 1923 (C, P) | 30 | 21 | 6 | 3 | 56 | 19 | +37 | 69 | Promotion to Serbian First League |
| 2 | Mačva Šabac | 30 | 20 | 7 | 3 | 50 | 9 | +41 | 67 | |
| 3 | Sloboda Užice | 30 | 16 | 4 | 10 | 43 | 26 | +17 | 52 | |
| 4 | Sloga Petrovac | 30 | 12 | 7 | 11 | 50 | 42 | +8 | 43 | |
| 5 | Rudar Kostolac | 30 | 12 | 7 | 11 | 29 | 29 | 0 | 43 | |
| 6 | Vujić Voda | 30 | 13 | 4 | 13 | 35 | 40 | −5 | 43 | |
| 7 | Železničar Lajkovac | 30 | 11 | 8 | 11 | 30 | 27 | +3 | 41 | |
| 8 | Sloboda Čačak | 30 | 10 | 10 | 10 | 33 | 40 | −7 | 40 | |
| 9 | Jedinstvo Ub | 30 | 11 | 6 | 13 | 25 | 35 | −10 | 39 | |
| 10 | Sloga Požega | 30 | 12 | 3 | 15 | 34 | 42 | −8 | 39 | |
| 11 | Šumadija Aranđelovac | 30 | 11 | 5 | 14 | 36 | 33 | +3 | 38 | |
| 12 | Radnički Stobex | 30 | 11 | 4 | 15 | 28 | 43 | −15 | 37 | |
| 13 | FAP | 30 | 9 | 10 | 11 | 33 | 41 | −8 | 37 | |
| 14 | Budućnost Valjevo | 30 | 11 | 3 | 16 | 31 | 44 | −13 | 36 | |
| 15 | Metalac Kraljevo (R) | 30 | 7 | 7 | 16 | 19 | 35 | −16 | 28 | Relegation to Zone League |
| 16 | Morava Velika Plana (R) | 30 | 6 | 3 | 21 | 25 | 52 | −27 | 21 | Relegation to Zone League |

(C) Champions; (P) Promoted; (R) Relegated
