= Bojan Matić =

Serbian footballer (born 1991)

Personal information
- Full name: Bojan Matić
- Date of birth: 22 December 1991 (age 34)
- Place of birth: Zrenjanin, SFR Yugoslavia
- Height: 1.90 m (6 ft 3 in)
- Position: Centre forward

Team information
- Current team: Voždovac
- Number: 9

Youth career
- Jedinstvo Novi Bečej

Senior career*
| Years | Team | Apps | (Gls) |
| 2008–2013 | Jedinstvo Novi Bečej | (Note: Missing stats for the second half of the 2011–12 season)135 | (61) |
| 2013–2015 | Senta | 52 | (25) |
| 2015 | Zemun | 3 | (0) |
| 2016 | Loznica | 7 | (2) |
| 2016–2018 | Mačva Šabac | 61 | (25) |
| 2018 | FC Seoul | 9 | (1) |
| 2019–2020 | Vojvodina | 32 | (13) |
| 2020–2021 | Partizan | 18 | (3) |
| 2020–2021 | → Atromitos (loan) | 17 | (0) |
| 2021 | Pakhtakor Tashkent | 12 | (2) |
| 2022 | Vojvodina | 14 | (4) |
| 2022–2023 | Napredak Kruševac | 29 | (3) |
| 2023 | Al-Shaeib | | |
| 2024–2025 | Dečić | 41 | (9) |
| 2025– | Voždovac | 31 | (5) |
- * Club domestic league appearances and goals as of 14 May 2026

Bojan Matić (Serbian Cyrillic: Бојан Матић; born 22 December 1991) is a Serbian professional footballer who plays as a forward for Voždovac.

== Club career ==
=== Early years ===
Born in Zrenjanin, Matić passed youth categories of Jedinstvo Novi Bečej. He joined the first team in 2008 at the age of 16. He scored one goal in eight caps for the club until the end of 2007–08 season. After scoring 6 goals in 15 matches in the first half of 2009–10 season, Matić was elected the Best Young Athlete of Novi Bečej in 2009. He was also marked as one of the most important players for avoiding relegation in the league after the end of season. In total, Matić was a member of the first team for six seasons in the Vojvodina League East. With 18 goals scored in 27 matches, he helped the team win the competition in the 2012–13 season and take promotion to the Serbian League Vojvodina. In summer 2013, he left the club and joined Senta, helping the team to take the first place after the mid-season. Shortly after, Matić moved on trial to Partizan, where he scored a few goals in friendly matches, but failed to sign a contract. In his two seasons with Senta, Matić collected 52 appearances and scored 25 goals. After a short spell with Zemun in late 2015, Matić joined Loznica in early 2016. He earned seven appearances, mostly as a back-up choice, and scored three goals.

=== Mačva Šabac ===
In summer 2016, Matić signed with Mačva Šabac, scoring a brace in his debut match against Sloboda Užice. He scored a total of eight goals in the first half of the season, and added six more in the second, ending as the league's second-highest goalscorer behind Uroš Đerić. He was included in the Best Eleven of the 2016–17 Serbian First League season by Serbian newspaper Sportski žurnal. On 29 July 2017, Matić scored his first goal in the 2017–18 Serbian SuperLiga season in a 1–0 victory over his former club Zemun, giving Mačva their first ever points in the top tier of Serbian football. He also scored two goals in a 4–0 away win against Javor Ivanjica in the next match, after which he was elected as the player of the week in the domestic competition. After scoring five goals in four matches in August 2017, Matić was elected as the player of the month in the Serbian SuperLiga.

=== FC Seoul ===
On 17 July 2018, Matić signed a one-and-a-half-year contract with K League 1 side FC Seoul.

On 24 January 2019, Matić's contract with FC Seoul was terminated by mutual consent.

=== Vojvodina ===
On 8 February 2019, Matić signed a two-year deal with Vojvodina. In late July 2019, Matić extended his contract with Vojvodina until June 2021.

== Career statistics ==
As of 11 August 2022

Appearances and goals by club, season and competition
| Club | Season | League | | | Cup | | Continental | | Other | | Total | |
| Club | Season | Division | Apps | Goals | Apps | Goals | Apps | Goals | Apps | Goals | Apps | Goals |
|---|---|---|---|---|---|---|---|---|---|---|---|---|
| Jedinstvo Novi Bečej | 2007–08 | Vojvodina League East | 8 | 1 | — | | — | | — | | 8 | 1 |
| Jedinstvo Novi Bečej | 2008–09 | Vojvodina League East | 29 | 3 | — | | — | | — | | 29 | 3 |
| Jedinstvo Novi Bečej | 2009–10 | Vojvodina League East | 30 | 14 | — | | — | | — | | 30 | 14 |
| Jedinstvo Novi Bečej | 2010–11 | Vojvodina League East | 28 | 21 | — | | — | | — | | 28 | 21 |
| Jedinstvo Novi Bečej | 2011–12 | Vojvodina League East | 13 | 4 | — | | — | | — | | 13 | 4 |
| Jedinstvo Novi Bečej | 2012–13 | Vojvodina League East | 27 | 18 | — | | — | | — | | 27 | 18 |
| Jedinstvo Novi Bečej | Total | | 135 | 61 | — | | — | | — | | 135 | 61 |
| Senta | 2013–14 | Serbian League Vojvodina | 27 | 14 | — | | — | | — | | 27 | 14 |
| Senta | 2014–15 | Serbian League Vojvodina | 25 | 11 | — | | — | | — | | 25 | 11 |
| Senta | Total | | 52 | 25 | — | | — | | — | | 52 | 25 |
| Zemun (Note: He is also wrongly referred as Stevan Matić on Soccerway due to his father's name) | 2015–16 | Serbian First League | 3 | 0 | 2 (Note: Including preliminary round match against Jedinstvo Užice and first round match against Spartak Subotica) | 0 | — | | — | | 5 | 0 |
| Loznica | 2015–16 | Serbian First League | 7 | 2 | — | | — | | — | | 7 | 2 |
| Mačva Šabac | 2016–17 | Serbian First League | 27 | 14 | — | | — | | — | | 27 | 14 |
| Mačva Šabac | 2017–18 | Serbian SuperLiga | 34 | 11 | 3 | 0 | — | | — | | 37 | 11 |
| Mačva Šabac | Total | | 61 | 25 | 3 | 0 | — | | — | | 64 | 25 |
| FC Seoul | 2018 | K League 1 | 9 | 1 | 2 | 0 | — | | — | | 11 | 1 |
| Vojvodina | 2018–19 | Serbian SuperLiga | 14 | 4 | 0 | 0 | — | | — | | 14 | 4 |
| Vojvodina | 2019–20 | Serbian SuperLiga | 18 | 9 | 1 | 0 | — | | — | | 19 | 9 |
| Vojvodina | Total | | 32 | 13 | 1 | 0 | — | | — | | 33 | 13 |
| Partizan | 2019–20 | Serbian SuperLiga | 10 | 3 | 3 | 1 | — | | — | | 13 | 4 |
| Partizan | 2020–21 | Serbian SuperLiga | 8 | 0 | 0 | 0 | 1 | 0 | — | | 9 | 0 |
| Partizan | Total | | 18 | 3 | 3 | 1 | 1 | 0 | — | | 22 | 4 |
| Atromitos (loan) | 2020–21 | Super League Greece | 17 | 0 | 2 | 0 | — | | — | | 19 | 0 |
| Pakhtakor | 2021 | Uzbekistan Super League | 12 | 2 | 4 | 0 | — | | — | | 16 | 2 |
| Vojvodina | 2021–22 | Serbian SuperLiga | 14 | 4 | 1 | 0 | 0 | 0 | — | | 15 | 4 |
| Napredak Kruševac | 2022–23 | Serbian SuperLiga | 29 | 3 | 1 | 1 | — | | — | | 30 | 4 |
| Career total | | | 389 | 139 | 19 | 2 | 1 | 0 | 0 | 0 | 409 | 141 |

== Honours ==
Jedinstvo Novi Bečej

- Vojvodina League East: 2012–13

Mačva Šabac

- Serbian First League: 2016–17
