= Aleksandar Veselinović =

Serbian football manager and player

Personal information
- Date of birth: 23 May 1970 (age 56)
- Place of birth: Obrovac, SR Croatia, SFR Yugoslavia (modern Croatia)
- Position: Defender

Youth career
- Velebit Benkovac
- Hajduk Split
- Red Star Belgrade

Senior career*
Years	Team	Apps	(Gls)
1992–1993	Bečej	5	(0)
1994–1996	Radnički Niš	32	(0)
1996–1997	RWDM	8	(0)
1998–1999	Spartak Varna	18	(0)
1999–2000	Hajduk Beograd	6	(0)

Managerial career
- 2014–2016: Sūduva
- 2017: Vojvodina
- 2017–2018: Spartak Subotica
- 2018: Vojvodina
- 2019–2020: Čukarički
- 2020–2021: Al Dhafra
- 2021: Al Batin
- 2022–2023: Al Dhafra
- 2024–2025: Partizani
- * Club domestic league appearances and goals

Aleksandar Veselinović (Serbian Cyrillic: Александар Веселиновић; born 23 May 1970) is a Serbian football manager and former player.

== Playing career ==
Born in Obrovac (in present-day Croatia), Veselinović spent some time in the youth system of Hajduk Split, before joining the youth categories of Red Star Belgrade in 1986.

During the 1990s, Veselinović spent one-and-a-half seasons with Radnički Niš in the First League of FR Yugoslavia, before moving abroad to Molenbeek. He also played for Bulgarian club Spartak Varna.

== Managerial career ==
On 21 December 2014, it was announced that Veselinović would take over as manager of Lithuanian side Sūduva. He parted ways with them on 31 August 2016.

In April 2017, Veselinović was appointed as manager of Vojvodina, but left the post after less than three weeks in charge. He subsequently took charge of Spartak Subotica in June 2017. In April 2018, Veselinović left the club to return to Vojvodina. He was hired as manager of Čukarički in May 2019.

In October 2020, Veselinović became manager of Emirati club Al Dhafra, but left the following January. He was then appointed as manager of Saudi side Al Batin in March 2021, saving them from relegation. In October 2022, Veselinović was brought back to Al Dhafra, replacing compatriot Nebojša Vignjević. He brought with him compatriots to employ as staff, such as Goran Stanić, Dejan Odavić and Dragan Sretenijević. The outlet Arab News named Veselinović "manager of the week" after his first match in charge.
