= NAAI =

Serbian sportswear company

- Company type: Sportswear
- Founded: 1979
- Fate: Ongoing
- Headquarters: Belgrade, Serbia
- Area served: Europe
- Products: Sports shoes, Cycling and Team sports
- Website: www.naai.rs

NAAI is a sportswear company headquartered in Belgrade, Serbia.

== History ==
NAAI was founded in 1979 as a small textile firm in the Belgrade neighbourhood of Vračar, but quickly expanded to include the production of sportswear. By the late 1980s the company opened its first polygon for the manufacturing of sports shoes, quickly expanding into the production of Cycling paraphernalia. The company has offices in its native Serbia, Bosnia and Herzegovina, Croatia, Austria, Germany, France, Switzerland, Sweden and Denmark.
