= Eze Vincent Okeuhie =

Nigerian footballer

Eze Okeuhie
Personal information
- Full name: Eze Vincent Okeuhie
- Date of birth: 6 June 1994 (age 32)
- Place of birth: Lagos, Nigeria
- Height: 1.75 m (5 ft 9 in)
- Position: Winger

Team information
- Current team: Safa

Youth career
- Collins Edwin Sports Club

Senior career*
Years	Team	Apps	(Gls)
2012–2013	Çaykur Rizespor	0	(0)
2013	→ Kartal (loan)	9	(0)
2013–2015	Apollon Limassol	2	(0)
2014–2015	→ Nea Salamina (loan)	37	(5)
2015–2016	Omonia	13	(1)
2016	CA Bizertin	0	(0)
2017	Metalac Gornji Milanovac	13	(8)
2018–2019	Vojvodina	56	(15)
2020	Čukarički	21	(5)
2021	Shakhtyor Soligorsk	21	(2)
2025	Racing Beirut	11	(5)
2025–	Safa	2	(0)
- * Club domestic league appearances and goals as of 23:33, 2 October 2025 (UTC)

Eze Vincent Okeuhie (born 6 June 1993) is a Nigerian professional footballer who plays as a winger for Lebanese Premier League club Safa.

== Career ==
Born in Lagos, and often referred to simply as Vincent Eze, he arrived to Turkish side Çaykur Rizespor in the start of the season 2012–13, however, they loaned him for the second half of the season to Kartal S.K. Playing with Kartal S.K. in the TFF First League, he made 9 appearances for the club.

Afterwards, he played with Cypriot clubs Apollon Limassol, Nea Salamina and Omonia. In 2016 he joined Tunisian CA Bizertin, but quickly left the team without making an appearance, before moving to Serbia and joining FK Metalac Gornji Milanovac. On 16 January 2018, Okeuhie signed a three-year deal with Vojvodina. On 28 January 2020, Okeuhie signed a two-year deal with Čukarički. On 17 January 2021, Okeuhie joined Belarusian Premier League champions Shakhtyor Soligorsk.
