= Mile Savković =

Serbian footballer

Mile Savković Миле Савковић
Personal information
- Date of birth: 11 March 1992 (age 34)
- Place of birth: Banatski Despotovac, FR Yugoslavia
- Height: 1.76 m (5 ft 9 in)
- Position: Midfielder

Team information
- Current team: Veternik
- Number: 21

Senior career*
Years	Team	Apps	(Gls)
2010–2014	BSK Borča	69	(8)
2014–2016	Jagodina	56	(10)
2016–2018	Spartak Subotica	58	(12)
2018–2020	Jagiellonia Białystok	14	(1)
2020–2022	Spartak Subotica	44	(3)
2022	Mladost Novi Sad	17	(0)
2023	Smederevo 1924		
2023–2024	Hajduk 1912		
2024	Kolubara	15	(3)
2024–2025	Jedinstvo Stara Pazova		
2025–	Veternik		

International career
2013	Serbia U21	1	(0)
- * Club domestic league appearances and goals as of 19 May 2024

Mile Savković (Serbian Cyrillic: Миле Савковић, born 11 March 1992) is a Serbian professional footballer who plays as a midfielder for Veternik.

== Career ==
In July 2023, Savković joined Serbian amateur side Hajduk 1912.
