= Momčilo Mrkaić =

Bosnian footballer (born 1990)

Personal information
- Date of birth: 21 September 1990 (age 36)
- Place of birth: Trebinje, SFR Yugoslavia
- Height: 1.92 m (6 ft 4 in)
- Position: Centre-forward

Team information
- Current team: Sloga Meridian
- Number: 11

Youth career
- Leotar

Senior career*
Years	Team	Apps	(Gls)
2008–2009	Leotar	8	(1)
2009–2011	Bežanija	33	(5)
2011	→ Gomel (loan)	6	(0)
2012–2013	Zemun	34	(14)
2013–2014	BSK Borča	37	(8)
2015	Drina Zvornik	12	(1)
2015–2016	Radnik Bijeljina	11	(0)
2016	→ Vitez (loan)	11	(3)
2016–2017	Zrinjski Mostar	10	(0)
2018–2020	Javor Ivanjica	34	(11)
2018–2019	→ Zemun (loan)	28	(6)
2020–2022	Vojvodina	64	(10)
2022–2023	Borac Banja Luka	30	(10)
2023	Tobol Kostanay	11	(1)
2024–	Sloga Meridian	17	(1)
- * Club domestic league appearances and goals as of 1 February 2025

Momčilo Mrkaić (Serbian Cyrillic: Момчило Мркаић; born 21 September 1990) is a Bosnian professional footballer who plays as a centre-forward for Bosnian Premier League club Sloga Meridian.

== Club career ==
Born in Trebinje, SR Bosnia and Herzegovina, he started playing with local club FK Leotar which was playing in the Premier League of Bosnia and Herzegovina at the time. Soon he was spotted as a talented youngster and in the summer of 2009 he was already moving abroad, to Serbia, and signing with New Belgrade-based club FK Bežanija.

A former Serbian SuperLiga member, Bežanija was fighting back then in the Serbian First League for its return to the SuperLiga. Mrkaić made 14 appearances in the first half of the season and then accepted to play on loan in Belarusian Premier League side FC Gomel the next half season. He won the Belarusian Cup while at Gomel in the 2010–11 cup season.

The following seasons, he played in Serbian second level sides FK Zemun and FK BSK Borča. During the winter-break of the 2014–15 season he returned to Bosnia and signed with Premier League side FK Drina Zvornik. Since then he played with another three Premier League clubs, FK Radnik Bijeljina, NK Vitez and HŠK Zrinjski Mostar. With Zrinjski he won the league title in the 2016–17 season.

After Zrinjski, Mrkaić returned to Serbia and played for FK Javor Ivanjica, before signing with another Serbian SuperLiga club in the summer of 2018, FK Zemun, where he has been playing ever since.

In January 2020, Mrkaić signed a contract with Vojvodina until the end of the 2022–23 season.

== Honours ==
Gomel

- Belarusian Cup: 2010–11

Zrinjski Mostar

- Bosnian Premier League: 2016–17

Vojvodina

- Serbian Cup: 2019–20
