= 2017–18 Serbian SuperLiga =

12th season of the Serbian SuperLiga

SuperLiga
- Season: 2017–18
- Dates: 21 July 2017 – 19 May 2018
- Champions: Red Star Belgrade; 4th SuperLiga title 29th domestic title
- Relegated: Javor Ivanjica; Borac Čačak
- Champions League: Red Star Belgrade
- Europa League: Partizan; Radnički Niš; Spartak Subotica
- Matches: 296
- Goals: 802 (2.71 per match)
- Top goalscorer: Aleksandar Pešić (25)
- Biggest home win: Red Star Belgrade 6–1 Rad; Partizan 6–1 Mačva; Voždovac 6–1 Zemun; Red Star Belgrade 5–0 Radnik; Čukarički 5–0 Bačka; Rad 5–0 Borac Čačak; Partizan 5–0 Borac Čačak
- Biggest away win: Čukarički 1–6 Vojvodina; Radnik 0–5 Red Star Belgrade; Vojvodina 0–5 Spartak Subotica
- Highest scoring: Red Star Belgrade 6–1 Rad; Partizan 6–1 Mačva; Voždovac 6–1 Zemun; Radnik 3–4 Mladost Lučani; Napredak Kruševac 4–3 Spartak Subotica; Mladost Lučani 2–5 Red Star Belgrade; Čukarički 1–6 Vojvodina
- Longest winning run: 10 games Red Star Belgrade
- Longest unbeaten run: 26 games Red Star Belgrade
- Longest winless run: 10 games Javor Ivanjica
- Longest losing run: 7 games Javor Ivanjica

The 2017–18 Serbian SuperLiga was the twelfth season of the Serbian SuperLiga, Serbia's top football league. The season began on 21 July 2017 and ended on 19 May 2018. FK Partizan were the defending champions from the previous season.

== Teams ==
The league consisted of 16 teams: fourteen teams from the 2016–17 Serbian SuperLiga and two new teams from the 2016–17 Serbian First League. Mačva Šabac, the 2016–17 First League champion, joined SuperLiga for the first time in history. Runners-up Zemun joined the top level ten years after being relegated.

=== Stadiums and locations ===
Locations of the 2017–18 Serbian SuperLiga teams

Club	City	Stadium	Capacity
Bačka	Bačka Palanka	Stadion Slavko Maletin Vava	5,500
Borac	Čačak	Čačak Stadium	8,000
Čukarički	Belgrade	Čukarički Stadium	4,070
Javor	Ivanjica	Ivanjica Stadium	4,000
Mačva	Šabac	Gradski stadion	8,000
Mladost	Lučani	Mladost Stadium	8,000
Napredak	Kruševac	Mladost Stadium	10,331
Partizan	Belgrade	Partizan Stadium	32,710
Rad	Belgrade	King Peter I Stadium	6,000
Radnički	Niš	Čair Stadium	18,151
Radnik	Surdulica	Surdulica City Stadium	3,312
Red Star	Belgrade	Rajko Mitić Stadium	55,538
Spartak	Subotica	City Stadium	13,000
Vojvodina	Novi Sad	Karađorđe Stadium	15,000
Voždovac	Belgrade	Shopping Center Stadium	5,200
Zemun	Belgrade	Zemun Stadium	10,000

=== Personnel and kits ===
Note: Flags indicate national team as has been defined under FIFA eligibility rules. Players and Managers may hold more than one non-FIFA nationality.

Team	Head coach	Captain	Kit manufacturer	Front shirt sponsor
Borac Čačak	(Serbia) Vladimir Stanisavljević	(Serbia) Vladimir Bajić	NAAI	Škoda Auto
Čukarički	(Serbia) Nenad Lalatović	(Serbia) Nikola Drinčić	adidas	ADOC
Javor Ivanjica	(Serbia) Vlado Jagodić	(Serbia) Ivan Cvetković	Miteks	Matis doo
Mačva Šabac	(Serbia) Dragan Aničić	(Serbia) Filip Pejović	NAAI	—
Mladost Lučani	(Serbia) Nenad Milovanović	(Serbia) Ivan Milošević	Miteks	Miteks
Napredak Kruševac	(Serbia) Milorad Kosanović	(Serbia) Jovan Markoski	Puma	Delta City
Bačka	(Sweden) Zvezdan Milošević	(Serbia) Veseljko Trivunović	D-Mag	AD Podunavlje
Partizan	(Serbia) Miroslav Đukić	(Serbia) Saša Ilić	Nike	mt:s
Rad	(Serbia) Zoran Milinković	(Serbia) Đorđe Denić	NAAI	—
Radnički Niš	(Serbia) Dragan Antić	(Serbia) Aleksandar Jovanović	Hummel	Niška pivara / mt:s
Radnik Surdulica	(Bosnia and Herzegovina) Simo Krunić	(Serbia) Vladan Pavlović	Jako	—
Red Star Belgrade	(Serbia) Vladan Milojević	(Serbia) Nenad Milijaš	Macron	Gazprom
Spartak Subotica	(Serbia) Aleksandar Veselinović	(Serbia) Vladimir Torbica	Legea	Ždrepčeva krv
Vojvodina	(Serbia) Ilija Stolica	(Serbia) Nikola Antić	Umbro	Viskol
Voždovac	(Serbia) Miloš Veselinović	(Serbia) Miloš Pavlović	NAAI	Stadion SC
Zemun	(Serbia) Milan Milanović	(Serbia) Ivan Božović	Umbro	—

Nike supplied the official ball for this season's league.

== Regular season ==
=== League table ===
Pos	Team	Pld	W	D	L	GF	GA	GD	Pts	Qualification
1	Red Star Belgrade	30	25	4	1	75	15	+60	77 (Note: Red Star were deducted two points.)	Qualification for the Championship round
2	Partizan	30	20	7	3	59	23	+36	65 (Note: Partizan were deducted two points.)	Qualification for the Championship round
3	Čukarički	30	14	9	7	43	26	+17	51	Qualification for the Championship round
4	Radnički Niš	30	14	8	8	46	40	+6	50	Qualification for the Championship round
5	Spartak Subotica	30	14	7	9	55	39	+16	49	Qualification for the Championship round
6	Voždovac	30	13	8	9	41	29	+12	47	Qualification for the Championship round
7	Napredak Kruševac	30	13	7	10	49	42	+7	46	Qualification for the Championship round
8	Vojvodina	30	12	8	10	33	29	+4	44	Qualification for the Championship round
9	Radnik Surdulica	30	10	6	14	33	52	−19	36	Qualification for the Relegation round
10	Zemun	30	9	8	13	30	38	−8	35 (Note: Zemun were ahead of Mladost Lučani on head-to-head away goals scored: Zemun 1 goal, Mladost 0 goals.)	Qualification for the Relegation round
11	Mladost Lučani	30	9	8	13	36	44	−8	35	Qualification for the Relegation round
12	Mačva Šabac	30	9	4	17	31	47	−16	31	Qualification for the Relegation round
13	Bačka	30	8	6	16	30	53	−23	30	Qualification for the Relegation round
14	Javor Ivanjica	30	7	4	19	25	48	−23	25	Qualification for the Relegation round
15	Borac Čačak	30	6	5	19	25	57	−32	23	Qualification for the Relegation round
16	Rad	30	6	3	21	29	58	−29	21	Qualification for the Relegation round

Source: SuperLiga (in Serbian), Soccerway
Rules for classification: 1) Points; 2) Head-to-head points; 3) Head-to-head goal difference; 4) Head-to-head goals scored; 5) Head-to-head away goals scored (if two teams tied); 6) Goal difference; 7) Goals scored; 8) Fair play ranking; 9) Draw.

=== Results ===
Home \ Away	BAČ	BOR	ČUK	JAV	MAČ	MLA	NAP	PAR	RAD	RNI	RSU	RSB	SPA	VOJ	VOŽ	ZEM
Bačka		1–0	2–3	2–1	2–1	1–0	1–4	1–2	2–1	1–1	4–2	2–2	0–2	1–0	0–3	1–0
Borac Čačak	2–1		2–2	2–1	2–0	1–2	3–3	1–2	3–1	1–1	3–1	0–2	0–4	0–2	0–0	0–1
Čukarički	5–0	2–0		0–0	2–0	1–0	2–0	0–2	3–0	0–0	1–2	1–2	4–1	2–1	2–1	4–1
Javor Ivanjica	2–1	1–0	3–3		0–4	3–0	0–1	0–2	3–2	1–3	1–0	0–2	1–1	0–1	0–3	0–1
Mačva Šabac	1–1	1–0	0–2	1–1		2–1	1–0	1–3	1–2	1–2	4–0	0–2	1–0	1–1	1–1	1–0
Mladost Lučani	1–0	4–1	1–1	3–0	2–0		2–1	1–2	2–1	2–2	0–0	2–5	2–0	0–3	1–3	1–1
Napredak Kruševac	1–1	3–1	1–2	2–1	3–1	0–0		2–1	2–2	3–1	1–2	1–0	4–3	1–0	1–2	2–1
Partizan	3–1	5–0	0–0	2–1	6–1	3–0	1–1		3–1	3–1	2–0	1–1	1–1	1–1	1–3	1–1
Rad	0–0	5–0	0–1	2–0	0–2	1–0	1–0	2–4		2–3	1–1	0–2	0–2	0–3	0–1	2–0
Radnički Niš	4–0	1–0	1–0	1–0	3–0	2–1	1–3	1–0	2–0		2–2	0–4	0–2	1–1	1–1	4–1
Radnik Surdulica	3–1	1–0	0–0	1–0	2–1	3–4	2–3	0–2	3–1	0–2		0–5	5–1	0–4	1–0	0–1
Red Star Belgrade	3–1	3–0	3–0	3–0	4–0	2–1	1–1	0–0	6–1	3–0	5–0		1–0	2–0	2–1	3–1
Spartak Subotica	2–1	3–1	0–0	4–0	3–2	3–3	2–1	0–1	2–0	4–2	3–1	1–2		1–1	0–0	1–2
Vojvodina	1–0	0–1	1–0	0–3	1–0	2–0	3–1	0–1	2–1	1–1	0–0	1–2	0–5		2–0	0–3
Voždovac	2–0	2–1	0–0	1–0	0–2	0–0	3–2	0–1	3–0	2–1	0–0	0–2	2–3	1–1		6–1
Zemun	1–1	3–0	2–0	0–2	1–0	0–0	1–1	1–3	2–0	1–2	0–1	0–1	1–1	0–0	3–0	

Source: SuperLiga (in Serbian)
Legend: Blue = home team win; Yellow = draw; Red = away team win.
For upcoming matches, an "a" indicates there is an article about the rivalry between the two participants.

== Play-offs ==
=== Championship round ===
The top eight teams advanced from the regular season. Points from the regular season were halved with half points rounded up. Teams played each other once.

==== League table ====
Pos	Team	Pld	W	D	L	GF	GA	GD	Pts	Qualification
1	Red Star Belgrade (C)	37	32	4	1	96	19	+77	60	Qualification for the Champions League first qualifying round
2	Partizan	37	23	8	6	71	33	+38	43	Qualification for the Europa League first qualifying round (Note: Since the winners of the 2017–18 Serbian Cup, Partizan, qualified for European competition based on league position, the spot awarded to the cup winners (Europa League first qualifying round) was passed to the fourth-placed team.)
3	Radnički Niš	37	18	8	11	63	51	+12	37 (Note: Radnički Niš finished ahead of Spartak Subotica on regular season points: Radnički 50 pts, Spartak 49 pts.)	Qualification for the Europa League first qualifying round
4	Spartak Subotica	37	18	7	12	62	49	+13	37	Qualification for the Europa League first qualifying round
5	Voždovac	37	16	8	13	48	42	+6	33	
6	Čukarički	37	16	9	12	54	44	+10	32	
7	Napredak Kruševac	37	15	8	14	57	55	+2	30	
8	Vojvodina	37	14	8	15	43	43	0	28	

Source: UEFA, Soccerway
Rules for classification: 1) Points; 2) Points in regular season; 3) Head-to-head points in regular season; 4) Head-to-head goal difference in regular season; 5) Head-to-head goals scored in regular season; 6) Head-to-head away goals scored in regular season (if two teams tied); 7) Goal difference; 8) Goals scored; 9) Fair play ranking; 10) Play-off (if two teams tied and need to decide champion or teams for UEFA competitions); 11) Drawing of lots.
(C) Champions

==== Results ====
Home \ Away	ČUK	NAP	PAR	RNI	RSB	SPA	VOJ	VOŽ
Čukarički				2–3		3–0	1–6	2–1
Napredak Kruševac	3–2				0–2		1–0	
Partizan	2–1	2–2		3–1		2–0		
Radnički Niš		4–1			1–3		5–0	3–0
Red Star Belgrade	3–0		2–1			4–0		5–1
Spartak Subotica		2–1		2–0				1–0
Vojvodina			2–1		1–2	0–2		
Voždovac		1–0	2–1				2–1	

Updated to match(es) played on 19 May 2018. Source: SuperLiga (in Serbian)
Legend: Blue = home team win; Yellow = draw; Red = away team win.
For upcoming matches, an "a" indicates there is an article about the rivalry between the two participants.

=== Relegation round ===
The bottom eight teams from the regular season play in the relegation round. Points from the regular season are halved with half points rounded up. Teams play each other once.

==== League table ====
Pos	Team	Pld	W	D	L	GF	GA	GD	Pts	Relegation
9	Radnik Surdulica	37	13	7	17	42	60	−18	28	
10	Mladost Lučani	37	11	11	15	44	52	−8	27	
11	Zemun	37	11	10	16	39	46	−7	26 (Note: Zemun were ahead of Mačva Šabac and Rad on regular season points: Zemun 35 pts, Mačva 31 pts, Rad 21 pts.)	
12	Mačva Šabac	37	11	8	18	38	52	−14	26	
13	Rad	37	10	6	21	40	64	−24	26	
14	Bačka	37	11	7	19	41	64	−23	25	
15	Javor Ivanjica (R)	37	10	6	21	33	57	−24	24	Relegation to the Serbian First League
16	Borac Čačak (R)	37	7	5	25	31	71	−40	15	Relegation to the Serbian First League

Source: UEFA, Soccerway
Rules for classification: 1) Points; 2) Points in regular season; 3) Head-to-head points in regular season; 4) Head-to-head goal difference in regular season; 5) Head-to-head goals scored in regular season; 6) Head-to-head away goals scored in regular season (if two teams tied); 7) Goal difference; 8) Goals scored; 9) Fair play ranking; 10) Play-off (if two teams tied and need to decide champion or teams for UEFA competitions); 11) Drawing of lots.
(R) Relegated

==== Results ====
Home \ Away	BAČ	BOR	JAV	MAČ	MLA	RAD	RSU	ZEM
Bačka		3–2	4–0	1–1				
Borac Čačak					0–2	1–2	2–0	
Javor Ivanjica		3–0				1–1		1–0
Mačva Šabac		2–0	1–2			0–0	2–1	
Mladost Lučani	1–3		3–1	0–0		1–1		
Rad	2–0						2–1	3–2
Radnik Surdulica	2–0		0–0		3–1			2–1
Zemun	3–0	2–1		1–1	0–0			

Updated to match(es) played on 17 May 2018. Source: SuperLiga (in Serbian)
Legend: Blue = home team win; Yellow = draw; Red = away team win.
For upcoming matches, an "a" indicates there is an article about the rivalry between the two participants.

== Individual statistics ==
=== Top scorers ===
As of matches played on 17 May 2018.

Pos	Scorer	Teams	Goals
1	(Serbia) Aleksandar Pešić	Red Star	25
2	(Serbia) Milan Pavkov	Radnički	23
3	(Ghana) Richmond Boakye	Red Star	15
4	(Serbia) Đorđe Ivanović	Spartak / Partizan	13
4	(Serbia) Igor Zlatanović	Radnik	13

=== Hat-tricks ===
Player	For	Against	Result	Date
(Serbia) Dejan Georgijević	Voždovac	Zemun	6–1	30 September 2017
(Serbia) Dejan Georgijević	Voždovac	Rad	3–0	21 October 2017
(Serbia) Aleksandar Pešić	Red Star	Radnički Niš	0–4	5 November 2017
(Ghana) Richmond Boakye^{4}	Red Star	Rad	6–1	18 November 2017
(Serbia) Aleksandar Pešić	Red Star	Radnik Surdulica	5–0	29 November 2017
(Serbia) Slaviša Stojanović	Radnički Niš	Bačka	4–0	18 February 2018
(Serbia) Petar Bojić	Čukarički	Bačka	5–0	3 March 2018
(Serbia) Aleksandar Lutovac	Rad	Borac Čačak	5–0	3 March 2018
(Serbia) Marko Docić	Čukarički	Spartak	4–1	1 April 2018
(Senegal) Ibrahima Mame N'Diaye	Napredak	Čukarički	3–2	13 May 2018
(Nigeria) Eze Vincent Okeuhie^{4}	Vojvodina	Čukarički	6–1	17 May 2018

^{4} Player scored four goals

=== Player of the week ===
Round	Player	Club	Goals	Assist
1	(Serbia) Slavoljub Srnić	Red Star	2	0
2	(Serbia) Nemanja Nikolić	Spartak	2	2
3	(Serbia) Bojan Matić	Mačva	2	0
4	(Serbia) Filip Stuparević	Voždovac	1	0
5	(Serbia) Nemanja Mladenović	Zemun	1	1
6	(Montenegro) Vladimir Volkov	Rad	1	0
7	(Serbia) Nemanja Nikolić (2)	Spartak	2	1
8	(Serbia) Đorđe Ivanović	Spartak	2	0
9	(Serbia) Andrija Luković	Voždovac	2	0
10	(Serbia) Nenad Gavrić	Mačva	2	0
11	(Serbia) Aleksa Vukanović	Napredak	2	0
12	(Serbia) Dejan Georgijević	Voždovac	3	0
13	(Serbia) Vladan Đogatović	Javor	0	0
14	(Serbia) Dejan Georgijević (2)	Voždovac	3	0
15	(Serbia) Enver Alivodić	Napredak	2	1
16	(Serbia) Aleksandar Pešić	Red Star	3	0
17	(Ghana) Richmond Boakye	Red Star	4	0
18	(Ghana) Richmond Boakye (2)	Red Star	2	0
19	(Serbia) Aleksandar Pešić (2)	Red Star	3	1
20	(Serbia) Lazar Arsić	Radnički	2	0
21	(Serbia) Mile Savković	Spartak	2	0
22	(Serbia) Milan Pavkov	Radnički	2	0
23	(Serbia) Dejan Đenić	Zemun	2	0
24	(Serbia) Milan Rodić	Red Star	2	0
25	(Serbia) Aleksandar Lutovac	Rad	3	1
26	(Serbia) Nikola Petković	Zemun	2	0
27	(Serbia) Aleksandar Lutovac (2)	Rad	2	0
28	(Bosnia and Herzegovina) Momčilo Mrkaić	Javor	2	0
29	(Serbia) Marko Docić	Čukarički	3	1
30	(Comoros) Ben Nabouhane	Red Star	2	1
31	(Serbia) Miljan Vukadinović	Zemun	2	0
32	(Serbia) Zoran Tošić	Partizan	2	0
33	(Serbia) Đorđe Ivanović (2)	Partizan	2	1
34	(Serbia) Ivan Cvetković	Javor	2	1
35	(Serbia) Luka Mićić	Bačka	2	0
36	(Senegal) Ibrahima Mame N'Diaye	Napredak Kruševac	3	0
37	(Nigeria) Eze Vincent Okeuhie	Vojvodina	4	1

== Awards ==
=== Team of the Season ===

Serbian SuperLiga Team of the Year

Position	Player	Team
GK	(Serbia) Vladimir Stojković	Partizan
RB	(Montenegro) Filip Stojković	Red Star
CB	(Serbia) Vujadin Savić	Red Star
CB	(Serbia) Nemanja Miletić	Partizan
LB	(Serbia) Miroslav Bogosavac	Čukarički
RM	(Serbia) Danilo Pantić	Partizan
CM	(Serbia) Nenad Krstičić	Red Star
CM	(Montenegro) Nikola Drinčić	Čukarički
LM	(Serbia) Nemanja Radonjić	Red Star
FW	(Serbia) Nemanja Nikolić	Spartak
FW	(Serbia) Aleksandar Pešić	Red Star

=== Player of the season ===
- (Serbia) Aleksandar Pešić (Red Star)

=== Coach of the season ===
- (Serbia) Vladan Milojević (Red Star)
