= FK Mačva Šabac =

Association football club in Šabac, Serbia

Mačva Šabac
- Full name: Fudbalski klub Mačva Šabac
- Nickname: Provincijski Urugvaj (Provincial Uruguay)
- Founded: 1919; 107 years ago
- Ground: FK Mačva Stadium
- Capacity: 5,500
- Coordinates: 44°44′54.0″N 19°41′09.1″E
- President: Filip Pejović
- Head coach: Nemanja Glušica
- League: Serbian SuperLiga
- 2025–26: Serbian First League, 2nd of 16
- Website: fkmacva.com
Home colours	Away colours

Fudbalski klub Mačva Šabac (Serbian Cyrillic: Фудбалски клуб Мачва Шабац, lit. 'Football Club Mačva Šabac') is a Serbian professional football club based in Šabac, which competes in the Serbian SuperLiga.

One of the oldest football clubs in Serbia, their nickname is Provincijski Urugvaj (lit. 'the provincial Uruguay'), which was first used in 1927, when the Uruguay national football team were one of the best teams in the world, and due to local people and media comparing Mačva's style to that of the Uruguayan team, the main daily newspaper Politika consistently used the nickname Provincijski Urugvaj.

In the period of Yugoslavia, Mačva mostly played in the lower tiers of the football system but did spend two seasons in national top flight of Yugoslavia in the 1951 and 1952 seasons. Afterwards, they would spend the next six decades in the Yugoslav lower-leagues but were a stable and respected lower-tier club in the country.

Mačva reached the Serbian SuperLiga for the first time ever in the 2017–18 season, returning to the top tier of Yugoslav/Serbian football for the first time in over six decades.

== History in Yugoslav league ==
The club was founded in 1919. During the 1920s, it played in the First League of the Novi Sad district (a league within the Belgrade Football Subassociation) and in 1930 the league was transferred into the First League of the Novi Sad Football Subassociation. In the period between the two world wars Mačva developed a fierce rivalry for the titles in those leagues with FK Vojvodina. The highlight for Mačva in this era was their participation in the 1931 Yugoslav Football Championship, even though they finished at the bottom in 6th place.

During this period the club got nicknamed in the press the "Provincial Uruguay". Provincial because they were playing in the Provincial Group of the Belgrade Subassociation League, and Uruguay because of their playing style which resembled Uruguay's, highly regarded at that time as they were the Olympic champions. The nickname was used for the first time in 1927. By early spring of 1928, Mačva finished at the top of the First League of the Novi Sad District where they defeated their main rivals Vojvodina. In the decisive match Mačva won over Vojvodina by 6:1. By the league system of that time, the winners of the district (župa) leagues had to compete to determine the Belgrade Subassociation Provincial League champion. Mačva first played at home against the winner of Banat district league champion, Obilić Veliki Bečkerek, which they won by 4:1, and then played away and won by 4:3 against the champion of the Šumadija district league, FK Šumadija 1903. Then, the draw determined that the final match would be played in Šabac against ZAŠK from Zemun, which Mačva smashed by 6:1 with goals by Bora Kesić, Milan Perić, Raduška Gajić and Kokan Stevanović. Otto Fischer coached the team in the 1931 Yugoslav Championship.

After becoming Belgrade Subassociation Provincial League champions, Mačva became notorious and the main daily newspaper Politika consistently used the nickname Provincial Uruguay, especially after their surprising win against SK Jedinstvo Beograd by 3:2 in Belgrade, and after their successful tour in Greece where they beat Thessaloniki sides Iraklis by 3:1, and Aris by 4–2.

In the following season, they became Novi Sad District League champions for the third time and qualified for the Vojvodina Group of the Belgrade Subassociation League. Mačva won the league and thus earned a spot in the Yugoslav First League where the major clubs in the country compete. They played well against BSK Belgrade and Hajduk Split and won in competition with the three-time Yugoslav champions Građanski Zagreb. Some Mačva players started to receive calls for the Yugoslavia national team, namely Milorad Arsenijević, Ivan Bek, Milorad Ilić, Milanče Jovanović, Radomir Vojisavljević, Andreja Kojić, Raduška Gajić and Bora Kesić. Other players of the Provincial Uruguay generation were Jefta Jovanović, Jovan Vračarić, Jovan Cvetković, Gidra Šljivić, Milan Perić, Kokan Stefanović, Kulja Suvajdžić, Bata Kiš, Vido Božović, Moma Jovanović, Mikica Sinđelić, Đole Jovanović, Đorđe Pantazijević, Mikela Stanojčić, Mita Salajdžijević, Nikola Kradžić, and Brana Janković.

After the Second World War, still within Yugoslavia, Mačva played two seasons in national top flight, it was in seasons 1951 and 1952 Yugoslav First League. Afterwards, they spent the next 6 decades in lower-leagues.

== Recent history ==
Under the club presidency of former Yugoslavia goalkeeper Ivica Kralj, FK Mačva returned to top flight football, after a six decade absence. in March 2015, Mačva made headlines by becoming the first professional club in Europe to have a Mongolian player, the international Murun Altankhuyag

In the 2017–18 Serbian SuperLiga season, Mačva's first season back in the top flight after more than six decades, Mačva finished in 12th position out of 16 clubs in the Serbian SuperLiga finishing the season with 11 wins 8 draws and 18 losses with a goal difference of 38 against 52. Securing survival in the club's first season back in the top flight after more than six decades of absence from top tier, was an accomplishment of a goal made at the start of the season by the club management. In the 2018–19 Serbian SuperLiga, Mačva finished in 12th place the same position they finished in their first season in the top flight of Serbian football.

The 2019–20 Serbian SuperLiga season was a disaster for Mačva, they finished bottom of the ladder (16th) winning only two games out of a possible 30, but due to the COVID-19 global pandemic, the Football Association of Serbia decided against relegating the bottom two teams of the Serbian SuperLiga which were FK Mačva and Belgrade club FK Rad, The Football Association of Serbia decided to scrap relegation and add more clubs so the league in the 2020/21 season would be going ahead with 20 clubs. In a time of crisis for the entire world some fortune came Mačva's way in a time of misery for most. In the 2019/20 season, Mačva struggled for goals all season scoring the fewest goals in the league with only 18 goals scored all up.

=== Recent league history ===
Season	Division	P	W	D	L	F	A	Pts	Pos
2020–21	1 - Serbian SuperLiga	38	7	4	27	26	81	25	19th
2021–22	2 - Serbian First League	30	10	9	11	26	37	39	9th
2022–23	2 - Serbian First League	30	8	13	9	28	31	37	11th
2023–24	2 - Serbian First League	37	13	12	12	36	29	51	6th
2024–25	2 - Serbian First League	37	16	9	12	40	33	57	4th

== Supporters ==
The organized supporters of Mačva Šabac are known as Šaneri (Serbian Cyrillic: Шанери), and have a friendship with Napredak Kruševac fan group Jakuza.

== Honours ==
- Serbian First League
  - Winner (1): 2016–17
- Serbian League West
  - Winner (2): 2013–14, 2015–16

== Current squad ==
As of 31 August 2026

Note: Flags indicate national team as defined under FIFA eligibility rules; some limited exceptions apply. Players may hold more than one non-FIFA nationality.

No.	Pos.	Nation	Player
1	GK	SRB	Sava Ristivojević
4	DF	SRB	Vladimir Ilić
5	MF	SRB	Darko Terzić
6	MF	SRB	Jakša Jevremović
7	FW	NGR	Sani Abdullahi
8	MF	SRB	Boško Vraštanović
9	FW	SRB	Milan Vidakov
10	FW	SRB	Mitar Ergelaš
11	MF	SRB	Vladimir Rakić
12	GK	SRB	Kosta Rakonić
15	DF	SRB	Slobodan Sladojević (captain)
17	DF	SRB	Nikola Lainović
19	DF	SRB	Igor Ristivojević
21	MF	SRB	Vasilije Đurić
22	MF	BIH	Kristijan Tojčić

No.	Pos.	Nation	Player
23	DF	SRB	Matija Županjac
26	DF	SRB	Uroš Drezgić (on loan from Rubin Kazan)
27	FW	SRB	Luka Pejović
28	GK	SRB	Strahinja Jović
30	MF	SRB	Đorđe Đorđić (on loan from Vojvodina)
33	DF	SRB	Uroš Blagojević
34	MF	SRB	Danilo Knežević
35	DF	CIV	Issa Koné
44	DF	SRB	Nemanja Stevanović
50	FW	SRB	Bojan Matić
55	FW	SRB	Stefan Čolović
70	MF	SRB	Milan Gvozdenović
79	MF	SRB	Petar Mirković
89	GK	SRB	Vukašin Jovanović
99	FW	SRB	Nikša Delibašić

=== Out on loan ===
Note: Flags indicate national team as defined under FIFA eligibility rules; some limited exceptions apply. Players may hold more than one non-FIFA nationality.

No.	Pos.	Nation	Player
—	FW	GHA	Adams Hamadu (at Loznica until the end of the 2026–27 season)

=== Coaching staff ===
Position	Name
Head coach	(Serbia) Nemanja Glušica
Assistant coach	(Serbia) Ivan Obrovac
Fitness coach	(Serbia) Mladen Mićanović
Goalkeeper coach	(Serbia) Marko Petrović
Club representative and coaching staff secretary	(Serbia) Miroslav Popović
Physiotherapist	(Serbia) Zoran Jovanović (Serbia) Živorad Radojičić (Serbia) Vladan Bogićević
Doctor	(Serbia) Ivan Stefanović
Economic	(Serbia) Dragan Stošić

=== Management ===
Position	Name
President	(Serbia) Filip Pejović
Sporting director	(Serbia) Miloš Adamović
General secretary	(Serbia) Zoran Jovanović
Security commissioner	(Serbia) Ljubomir Peranović
PR manager	(Serbia) Jelena Novaković

== Notable players ==
Former players with senior national team appearances:

- (Bosnia and Herzegovina) Đorđe Kamber
- (Cyprus) Vladan Tomić
- (Kingdom of Yugoslavia) (France) Ivan Bek
- (Kazakhstan) Nenad Erić
- (North Macedonia) Filip Despotovski
- (North Macedonia) Hristijan Kirovski
- (North Macedonia) Perica Stančeski
- (Montenegro) Filip Kasalica
- (Mongolia) Murun Altankhuyag
- (Colombia) Dilan Ortíz
- (Serbia) Andrija Kaluđerović
- (Serbia) Nemanja Miletić
- (Serbia) Bojan Šaranov
- (Serbia and Montenegro) Miroslav Đukić
- (Serbia and Montenegro) Bojan Neziri
- (Serbia and Montenegro) Boris Vasković
- (Kingdom of Yugoslavia) Andreja Kojić
- (Socialist Federal Republic of Yugoslavia) Aleksandar Ivoš
- (Socialist Federal Republic of Yugoslavia) Vojislav Melić

For the list of all current and former players with Wikipedia article, please see: Category:FK Mačva Šabac players.
