= 2019–20 Serbian SuperLiga =

14th season of Serbian SuperLiga

SuperLiga
- Season: 2019–20
- Dates: 19 July 2019 – 16 March 2020; 29 May – 20 June
- Champions: Red Star; 6th SuperLiga title 31st domestic title
- Relegated: None
- Champions League: Red Star
- Europa League: Partizan; Vojvodina; TSC
- Matches: 240
- Goals: 665 (2.77 per match)
- Top goalscorer: Vladimir Silađi; Nenad Lukić; Nikola Petković (16 goals each)
- Biggest home win: TSC 6–1 Javor; Vojvodina 5–0 Rad; Proleter 5–0 Rad; Javor 5–0 Inđija
- Biggest away win: Javor 0–7 Radnički Niš
- Highest scoring: Partizan 6–2 Javor
- Longest winning run: Red Star, TSC 7 games
- Longest unbeaten run: Red Star 21 games
- Longest winless run: Mačva 18 games
- Longest losing run: Inđija 11 games

The 2019–20 Serbian SuperLiga (known as the Linglong Tire SuperLiga for sponsorship reasons) is the fourteenth season of the Serbian SuperLiga. Red Star was the defending champions from the previous season.

The season was suspended on 15 March 2020, as a result of a state of emergency declared following the COVID-19 pandemic, and resumed on 29 May 2020. The season was shortened and the play-offs (championship round and relegation round) were cancelled, and no teams would be relegated.

== Teams ==
Locations of the 2019–20 Serbian SuperLiga teams
Locations of the 2019–20 Serbian SuperLiga teams on the territory of Belgrade

The league consisted of 16 teams: thirteen teams from the 2018–19 Serbian SuperLiga and three new teams from the 2018–19 Serbian First League, TSC who are making their debut on top tier, Javor who made an immediate return to top tier, and Inđija who are returning to top tier after an 8-year absence and also were promoted for the second time in their history to top tier.

=== Venues ===
Club	City	Stadium	Capacity
Inđija	Inđija	Inđija Stadium	4,500
Javor-Matis	Ivanjica	Ivanjica Stadium	3,000
Čukarički	Belgrade	Čukarički Stadium	4,070
Mačva	Šabac	Mačva Stadium	5,494
Mladost	Lučani	Mladost Stadium	5,944
Napredak	Kruševac	Mladost Stadium	10,331
Partizan	Belgrade	Partizan Stadium	32,710
Proleter	Novi Sad	Karađorđe Stadium	14,458
Rad	Belgrade	King Peter I Stadium	3,919
Radnički	Niš	Čair Stadium	18,151
Radnik	Surdulica	Surdulica City Stadium	3,312
Red Star	Belgrade	Rajko Mitić Stadium	55,538
Spartak	Subotica	City Stadium	13,000
Vojvodina	Novi Sad	Karađorđe Stadium	14,458
Voždovac	Belgrade	Shopping Center Stadium	5,175
TSC	Bačka Topola	Bačka Topola City Stadium	5,000

=== Personnel and kits ===
Note: Flags indicate national team as has been defined under FIFA eligibility rules. Players and Managers may hold more than one non-FIFA nationality.

Team	Head coach	Captain	Kit manufacturer	Front shirt sponsor
Inđija	(Serbia) Aleksandar Janjić	(Serbia) Srđan Dimitrov	Adidas	Žuti Market
Javor Ivanjica	(Serbia) Igor Bondžulić	(Serbia) Ivan Cvetković	Miteks	Matis
Čukarički	(Serbia) Aleksandar Veselinović	(Serbia) Marko Docić	Adidas	Argifen
Mačva Šabac	(Serbia) Dragan Aničić	(Serbia) Filip Pejović	NAAI	—
Mladost Lučani	(North Macedonia) Goran Stanić	(Serbia) Ivan Milošević	Miteks	Miteks
Napredak Kruševac	(Serbia) Dragan Ivanović	(Serbia) Jovan Markoski	Givova	Delta City
Partizan	(Serbia) Savo Milošević	(Serbia) Vladimir Stojković	Nike	mt:s
Proleter Novi Sad	(Serbia) Branko Žigić	(Serbia) Siniša Babić	NAAI	Novi Sad - Gas
Rad	(Serbia) Marko Mićović	(Serbia) Branislav Milošević	NAAI	mt:s
Radnički Niš	(Montenegro) Radoslav Batak	(Serbia) Saša Stojanović	Macron	mt:s
Radnik Surdulica	(Bosnia and Herzegovina) Simo Krunić	(Serbia) Vladan Pavlović	Jako	mt:s
Red Star Belgrade	(Serbia) Dejan Stanković	(Canada) Milan Borjan	Macron	Gazprom
Spartak Subotica	(Serbia) Vladimir Gačinović	(Serbia) Stefan Milošević	Legea	Ždrepčeva krv
Vojvodina	(Serbia) Nenad Lalatović	(Montenegro) Nikola Drinčić	Kelme	Srbijagas
Voždovac	(Serbia) Radomir Koković	(Montenegro) Nemanja Nikolić	Adidas	Stadion SC
TSC	(Serbia) Zoltan Sabo	(Serbia) Saša Tomanović	Adidas	SAT-TRAKT

Nike is the official ball supplier for Serbian SuperLiga.

Kelme is the official sponsor of the Referee's Committee of the Football Association of Serbia.

== Transfers ==
For the list of transfers involving SuperLiga clubs during 2019–20 season, please see: List of Serbian football transfers summer 2019 and List of Serbian football transfers winter 2019–20.

== Regular season ==
=== League table ===
Pos	Team	Pld	W	D	L	GF	GA	GD	Pts	Qualification
1	Red Star Belgrade (C)	30	25	3	2	68	18	+50	78	Qualification for the Champions League first qualifying round
2	Partizan	30	20	4	6	69	25	+44	64	Qualification for the Europa League first qualifying round
3	Vojvodina	30	19	5	6	47	27	+20	62	Qualification for the Europa League third qualifying round (Note: Vojvodina qualified for the Europa League third qualifying round by winning the 2019–20 Serbian Cup. As a result, the spot awarded to the third-placed team (Europa League first qualifying round) was passed to the fourth-placed team.)
4	TSC	30	17	8	5	59	34	+25	59	Qualification for the Europa League first qualifying round
5	Radnički Niš	30	16	4	10	51	37	+14	52	
6	Čukarički	30	15	6	9	42	36	+6	51	
7	Spartak Subotica	30	14	4	12	46	48	−2	46	
8	Voždovac	30	13	6	11	45	41	+4	45	
9	Mladost Lučani	30	13	4	13	31	40	−9	43	
10	Napredak Kruševac	30	9	6	15	33	41	−8	33	
11	Radnik Surdulica	30	8	7	15	34	50	−16	31	
12	Proleter Novi Sad	30	7	9	14	30	42	−12	30	
13	Javor-Matis	30	6	10	14	43	62	−19	28	
14	Inđija	30	7	4	19	26	48	−22	25	
15	Rad	30	4	3	23	23	63	−40	15	
16	Mačva Šabac	30	2	7	21	18	53	−35	13	

Source: SuperLiga (in Serbian), Soccerway
Rules for classification: 1) Points; 2) Head-to-head points; 3) Head-to-head goal difference; 4) Head-to-head goals scored; 5) Head-to-head away goals scored (if two teams tied); 6) Goal difference; 7) Goals scored; 8) Fair play ranking; 9) Draw.
(C) Champions

=== Results ===
Home \ Away	ČUK	INĐ	JAV	MAČ	MLA	NAP	PAR	PNS	RAD	RNI	RSU	RSB	SPA	VOJ	VOŽ	TSC
Čukarički		0–1	2–0	3–1	1–0	1–0	2–1	2–1	2–0	1–0	1–0	0–2	4–1	0–0	2–1	2–1
Inđija	1–3		2–3	0–0	0–2	1–0	0–1	1–2	1–0	0–1	2–1	1–1	1–2	2–0	3–0	1–1
Javor-Matis	2–2	5–0		3–1	1–2	2–2	0–2	1–0	3–0	0–7	0–0	1–1	2–2	1–3	1–2	3–2
Mačva Šabac	0–0	2–2	2–1		0–1	0–1	0–2	0–1	1–0	0–1	1–1	0–3	1–4	0–1	0–1	0–1
Mladost Lučani	1–0	2–1	3–3	2–1		0–1	1–0	1–1	2–0	1–1	2–1	0–1	2–0	1–2	2–1	0–3
Napredak Kruševac	3–1	1–3	1–1	2–1	1–0		2–2	0–0	4–0	1–1	0–1	0–1	0–1	0–2	1–1	1–3
Partizan	4–1	3–0	6–2	4–0	4–1	2–3		3–1	3–0	1–0	3–0	2–0	4–0	4–0	1–2	1–1
Proleter Novi Sad	2–1	1–0	2–2	1–1	0–1	2–0	0–3		5–0	1–1	2–1	0–2	0–1	0–1	2–2	1–3
Rad	2–3	1–0	1–1	2–0	0–0	2–0	1–2	1–1		1–2	0–1	0–5	2–0	1–2	0–2	3–4
Radnički Niš	2–0	2–1	2–1	3–1	3–0	4–1	1–4	3–0	4–3		0–2	0–2	2–1	1–2	2–1	3–1
Radnik Surdulica	3–3	2–0	2–0	2–2	0–1	1–4	1–2	1–1	1–0	2–4		0–5	4–0	0–4	2–2	1–0
Red Star Belgrade	3–1	2–1	2–0	3–1	2–0	3–0	0–0	2–1	3–1	2–0	4–1		3–1	2–0	2–0	3–1
Spartak Subotica	0–1	3–0	1–0	3–1	3–1	0–2	3–2	4–1	2–1	1–1	3–1	2–3		0–0	2–1	1–2
Vojvodina	1–1	1–0	2–2	3–1	2–1	2–1	1–0	1–0	5–0	3–0	1–0	1–2	2–0		1–2	2–2
Voždovac	2–2	4–1	2–1	2–0	2–0	1–0	1–2	2–0	2–1	1–0	1–1	1–3	2–3	1–2		1–2
TSC	1–0	2–0	6–1	0–0	5–1	2–1	1–1	1–1	2–0	2–0	2–1	2–1	2–2	2–0	2–2	

Source: SuperLiga (in Serbian)
Legend: Blue = home team win; Yellow = draw; Red = away team win.

== Individual statistics ==
=== Top scorers ===
As of matches played on 19 June 2020.

Pos	Scorer	Teams	Goals
1	(Serbia) Vladimir Silađi	TSC	16
1	(Serbia) Nenad Lukić	TSC	16
1	(Serbia) Nikola Petković	Javor	16
4	(Serbia) Stefan Mihajlović	Radnički	15
5	(Comoros) Ben	Red Star	13

=== Hat-tricks ===
Player	For	Against	Result	Date
(Nigeria) Umar Sadiq	Partizan	Javor	6–2	22 November 2019
(Serbia) Lazar Tufegdžić	Spartak	Proleter	4–1	4 December 2019

=== Player of the week ===
As of matches played on 20 June 2020.

Round	Player	Club	Goals	Assists	Ref.
1	(Serbia) Bojan Matić	Vojvodina	2	0	
2	(North Macedonia) Boban Georgiev	Radnik	2	0	
3	(Serbia) Petar Bojić	Vojvodina	0	3	
4	(Serbia) Igor Ivanović	Napredak	2	0	
5	(Serbia) Nenad Lukić	TSC	2	0	
6	(Bosnia and Herzegovina) Nermin Haskić	Radnički	2	0	
7	(Serbia) Lazar Tufegdžić	Spartak	0	2	
8	(Serbia) Igor Ivanović (2)	Napredak	1	2	
9	(Serbia) Vladimir Silađi	TSC	2	0	
10	(Guinea) Seydouba Soumah	Partizan	1	2	
11	(Serbia) Nemanja Nikolić	Vojvodina	1	1	
12	(Serbia) Stefan Mihajlović	Radnički	2	1	
13	(Serbia) Milan Pavkov	Red Star	1	2	
14	(Serbia) Igor Ivanović (3)	Napredak	1	0	
15	(Nigeria) Umar Sadiq	Partizan	1	2	
16	(Serbia) Miljan Vukadinović	Napredak	2	1	
17	(Nigeria) Umar Sadiq (2)	Partizan	3	0	
18	(Serbia) Vladimir Otašević	Spartak	2	0	
19	(Serbia) Lazar Tufegdžić (2)	Spartak	3	0	
20	(Serbia) Miroslav Bjeloš	Napredak	2	0	
21	(Israel) Bibras Natcho	Partizan	2	0	
22	(Serbia) Nikola Čumić	Radnički	2	0	
23	(Bosnia and Herzegovina) Momčilo Mrkaić	Vojvodina	2	0	
24	(Serbia) Miljan Vukadinović (2)	Vojvodina	1	1	
25	(Comoros) Ben	Red Star	2	1	
26	(Serbia) Nenad Lukić (2)	TSC	1	1	
27	(Serbia) Đuro Zec	TSC	2	1	
28	(Serbia) Nemanja Nikolić (2)	Spartak	2	1	
29	(Serbia) Stefan Mihajlović (2)	Radnički	2	1	
30	(Serbia) Nikola Čumić (2)	Radnički	1	2	
