= 2025–26 Serbian First League =

Serbian football league season

Serbian First League
- Season: 2025–26
- Dates: 2 August 2025 –
- Matches: 159
- Goals: 191 (1.2 per match)
- Top goalscorer: Ethan Hoard (6 goals)
- All statistics correct as of 24 September 2025.

The 2025–26 Serbian First League is the 21st season of the Serbian First League since its establishment. The season began on 2 August 2025. The defending champions are Radnik.

== League format ==
Each team will play each other twice in round-robin format after which top half will play in Promotion round and bottom half in Relegation round Play-offs. First two teams from the Promotion round will be promoted to next season of Serbian SuperLiga, while last six teams from Relegation round will be relegated.

== Teams ==
Location of teams in the 2025–26 Serbian First league
Locations of the 2025-26 Serbian SuperLiga teams from Belgrade

The league consist of 16 teams: ten teams from the previous season, two teams relegated from 2024–25 Serbian SuperLiga and four new teams promoted from Serbian League. Promoted teams are SU Dinamo Jug, FAP, Kabel, Loznica and Ušće Novi Beograd. SU Dinamo Jug, FAP will play in First League for the first time in history for this season, Tekstilac and Jedinstvo who were returned to First League after one year in top tier, Mladost GAT withdraw from League will replaced by Loznica has finished in 3rd place of Serbian League West; they are replacing Radnik and Javor-Matis were promoted to SuperLiga, while Inđija Toyo Tires, Radnički SM, Sloboda Užice and Sloven were relegated to Serbian League.

=== Team changes ===
Promoted from 2024–25 Serbian League	Relegated from 2024–25 Serbian SuperLiga	Promoted to 2025–26 Serbian SuperLiga	Relegated to 2025–26 Serbian League	Withdraw
▲SU Dinamo Jug ▲FAP ▲ Kabel ▲ Loznica ▲ Ušće Novi Beograd	▼ Tekstilac ▼ Jedinstvo	▲ Radnik ▲ Javor-Matis	▼ Inđija Toyo Tires ▼ Radnički SM ▼ Sloboda Užice ▼ Sloven	Mladost GAT

Team	City	Stadium	Capacity
Borac 1926	Čačak	Čačak Stadium	8,000
FAP	Priboj	Priboj City Stadium	10,000
Dubočica	Leskovac	Dubočica Stadium	8,136
Jedinstvo	Ub	Dragan Džajić Stadium	4,000
Kabel	Novi Sad	Stadium FK Proleter	1,200
Loznica	Loznica	Lagator Stadium	8,030
Mačva	Šabac	FK Mačva Stadium	5,500
OFK Vršac	Vršac	Vršac City Stadium	5,000
RFK Grafičar	Belgrade	Rajko Mitić Stadium – South Stand Artificial Grass Field	1,000
FK Smederevo	Smederevo	Smederevo Stadium	17,200
SU Dinamo Jug	Vranje	Yumco Stadium	2,500
Tekstilac	Odžaci	Odžaci City Stadium	3,000
Trayal	Kruševac	Mladost Stadium	10,331
Ušće Novi Beograd	New Belgrade	Stadium FK Bežanija	1,200
Voždovac	Belgrade	Voždovac Stadium	5,200
Zemun	Belgrade	Zemun Stadium	9,600

=== Personnel and kits ===
Note: Flags indicate national team as has been defined under FIFA eligibility rules. Players and Managers may hold more than one non-FIFA nationality.

Team	Manager	Captain	Kit maker	Shirt sponsor(s)				
Team	Manager	Captain	Kit maker	Borac 1926	(Serbia) Nemanja Krtolica	(Serbia) Nikola Milekić	Givova	AutoČačak
FAP	(Serbia) Albert Nađ	(Serbia) Veljko Plazinić	Givova	FAP Priboj				
Dubočica	(Serbia) Nenad Mijailović	(Serbia) Marko Momčilović	Erima	Millennium Team				
Jedinstvo	(Serbia) Uroš Matić	(Serbia) Kristijan Bošković	SevenSports	dr Milk				
Kabel	(Serbia) Dusan Bajić	(Serbia) Nemanja Toroman	Errea	Energotehnika Južna Bačka				
Loznica	(Serbia) Dejan Nikolić	(Serbia) Darko Stanojević	Adidas	Parmenion				
Mačva	(Serbia) Nemanja Glušica	(Serbia) Slobodan Sladojević	NAAI	Grad Šabac, MPPD BRAĆA RUŽIĆ DOO KLENJE				
OFK Vršac	(Serbia) Miljan Đurović	(Serbia) Danko Kiković	Capelli Sport	Vinarija Soul Wine Vršac				
RFK Grafičar	(Serbia) Milan Stegnjaić	(Serbia) Filip Vasiljević	Joma	GoTer Construction				
FK Smederevo	(Serbia) Nikola Mitić	(Serbia) Aleksa Marković	Ardu Sport	Grad Smederevo				
SU Dinamo Jug	(Serbia) Ivica Milutinović	(Serbia) Filip Stamenković	Ardu Sport	AUX Air Conditioner				
Tekstilac	(Serbia) Milan Đorđević	(Serbia) Krsta Đorđević	Ardu Sport	Konvar Beograd				
Trayal	(Serbia) Bojan Miladinović	(Serbia) Marko Stanojević	SevenSports	Trayal				
Ušće Novi Beograd	(Serbia) Goran Dragoljić	(Serbia) Uroš Vukašinović	SevenSports					
Voždovac	(Serbia) Dejan Branković	(Serbia) Vukašin Braunović	Joma	Stadion Shopping Center				
Zemun	(Serbia) Milan Kuljić	(Serbia) Mladen Živković	SevenSports	PMC Inženjering				

Notes

- Erima is the official ball supplier for Serbian First League.
- Capelli Sport is the official sponsor of the Referee's Committee of the Football Association of Serbia.

== Regular season ==
=== League table ===
Pos	Team	Pld	W	D	L	GF	GA	GD	Pts	Qualification
1	Zemun	35	20	10	5	55	33	+22	70	Qualification for the Championship round
2	Mačva	35	19	9	7	47	29	+18	66	Qualification for the Championship round
3	Voždovac	35	19	8	8	60	29	+31	65	Qualification for the Championship round
4	Loznica	35	17	10	8	37	26	+11	61	Qualification for the Championship round
5	OFK Vršac	35	10	16	9	35	36	−1	46	Qualification for the Championship round
6	Jedinstvo	35	11	11	13	46	52	−6	44	Qualification for the Championship round
7	SU Dinamo Jug	35	14	12	9	37	31	+6	50 (Note: SU Dinamo Jug were deducted four points.)	Qualification for the Relegation round
8	FK Smederevo	35	14	7	14	44	36	+8	49	Qualification for the Relegation round
9	Borac 1926	35	13	9	13	39	38	+1	48	Qualification for the Relegation round
10	Tekstilac	35	11	11	13	42	48	−6	44	Qualification for the Relegation round
11	RFK Grafičar	35	11	10	14	32	34	−2	43	Qualification for the Relegation round
12	Kabel	35	9	13	13	34	48	−14	40	Qualification for the Relegation round
13	Dubočica	35	8	12	15	36	51	−15	36	Qualification for the Relegation round
14	Trayal	35	9	8	18	39	43	−4	35	Qualification for the Relegation round
15	FAP	35	7	10	18	33	55	−22	31	Qualification for the Relegation round
16	Ušće Novi Beograd	35	5	10	20	27	54	−27	25	Qualification for the Relegation round

Updated to match(es) played on 11 May 2026. Source: PrvaLiga (in Serbian)
Rules for classification: 1) Points; 2) Head-to-head points; 3) Head-to-head goal difference; 4) Head-to-head goals scored; 5) Head-to-head away goals scored (if two teams tied); 6) Goal difference; 7) Goals scored; 8) Fair play ranking; 9) Draw.

=== Results ===
Home \ Away	BOR	DUB	DIN	FAP	GRA	JED	KAB	LOZ	MAČ	SME	TEK	TRA	UŠĆ	VOŽ	VRŠ	ZEM
Borac 1926		3–0	1–0	1–1	0–0	1–0	0–0	1–0	0–1	0–0	0–1	1–0	0–1	0–0	2–2	1–1
Dubočica	3–2		1–1	2–3	1–1	0–0	3–0	0–1	1–1	2–0	0–0	1–0	1–0	2–3	1–0	0–1
SU Dinamo Jug	1–0	0–0		2–0	1–1	1–3	1–1	2–1	1–0	2–2	0–1	1–0	2–1	1–0	1–1	0–1
FAP	1–1	2–0	0–3		2–0	2–0	2–0	0–0	2–0	0–1	1–2	1–0	2–2	1–2	0–1	0–1
RFK Grafičar	3–1	2–1	1–2	2–1		4–0	1–1	1–2	2–0	0–0	1–2	1–1	0–1	0–1	0–2	2–1
Jedinstvo	3–4	4–0	1–1	2–1	2–0		1–0	1–1	2–2	0–3	3–1	1–1	3–0	1–4	2–2	2–2
Kabel	0–4	3–1	0–3	0–0	0–0	0–1		1–1	0–3	1–3	0–0	2–1	1–1	0–0	1–0	0–1
Loznica	2–0	1–0	2–1	2–0	1–0	1–0	1–1		0–0	1–0	1–3	1–0	2–1	1–1	2–0	0–2
Mačva	3–1	2–1	2–2	1–1	1–3	2–1	3–0	2–1		1–0	2–1	2–0	2–0	2–1	1–0	1–1
FK Smederevo	0–2	4–0	2–0	5–1	0–1	1–1	3–0	2–0	0–2		0–0	2–0	2–1	1–1	3–0	0–1
Tekstilac	1–1	2–2	21 Feb	2–1	4 Apr	1–3	1–3	8 Mar	2–2	2–0		21 Mar	1–0	1–2	2–3	0–2
Trayal	1–0	21 Feb	3–0	2–0	14 Mar	1–3	2–0	1–1	28 Mar	4–0	4–1		1–0	1–2	28 Feb	1–1
Ušće Novi Beograd	2–1	1–1	0–0	2–0	0–1	1–1	0–1	21 Feb	1–2	3–1	28 Mar	8 Mar		1–3	14 Mar	0–0
Voždovac	3–0	1–1	4 Apr	7–0	3–0	28 Feb	0–2	1–1	15 Feb	0–0	2–0	2–1	2–1		0–0	14 Mar
OFK Vršac	21 Feb	1–2	0–0	0–0	0–0	0–0	2–2	1–0	0–0	4 Apr	2–0	1–1	4–1	21 Mar		8 Mar
Zemun	28 Feb	3–0	1–1	4 Apr	3–1	2–2	15 Feb	2–1	1–0	21 Mar	2–2	3–2	2–1	3–1	2–2	

Updated to match(es) played on 14 December 2025. Source: PrvaLiga (in Serbian)
Legend: Blue = home team win; Yellow = draw; Red = away team win.
For upcoming matches, an "a" indicates there is an article about the rivalry between the two participants.

== Play-offs ==
=== Championship round ===
The top six teams advanced from the regular season. Teams played each other once.

==== League table ====
Pos	Team	Pld	W	D	L	GF	GA	GD	Pts	Qualification
1	Zemun (C, P)	35	20	10	5	55	33	+22	70	Promotion to the Serbian SuperLiga
2	Mačva (P)	35	19	9	7	47	29	+18	66	Promotion to the Serbian SuperLiga
3	Voždovac	35	19	8	8	60	29	+31	65	
4	Loznica	35	17	10	8	37	26	+11	61	
5	OFK Vršac	35	10	16	9	35	36	−1	46	
6	Jedinstvo	35	11	11	13	46	52	−6	44	

Updated to match(es) played on 14 May 2026. Source: PrvaLiga (in Serbian)
Rules for classification: 1) Points; 2) Points in regular season; 3) Head-to-head points in regular season; 4) Head-to-head goal difference in regular season; 5) Head-to-head goals scored in regular season; 6) Head-to-head away goals scored in regular season (if two teams tied); 7) Goal difference; 8) Goals scored; 9) Fair play ranking; 10) Drawing of lots.
(C) Champions; (P) Promoted

=== Relegations round ===
The bottom ten teams advanced from the regular season. Teams played each other once.

==== League table ====
Pos	Team	Pld	W	D	L	GF	GA	GD	Pts	Qualification
7	FK Smederevo	39	17	8	14	53	39	+14	59	
8	SU Dinamo Jug (R)	39	16	14	9	44	33	+11	58 (Note: SU Dinamo Jug were deducted four points.)	Relegation to Serbian League
9	Borac 1926	39	14	12	13	43	40	+3	54	
10	RFK Grafičar	39	14	10	15	41	38	+3	52	
11	Tekstilac (R)	39	12	13	14	47	52	−5	49	Relegation to Serbian League
12	Kabel (R)	39	10	13	16	38	56	−18	43	Relegation to Serbian League
13	FAP (R)	39	10	10	19	41	58	−17	40	Relegation to Serbian League
14	Dubočica (Note: GFK Dubočica remained in the league after Dinamo Jug withdrew from the competition, resulting in Dubočica retaining their spot. Dubočica had originally finished 14th in the 2025–26 season, a position that would normally have resulted in relegation, but was awarded the vacant spot based on the "sporting interest" clause in the competition regulations.)	39	8	13	18	39	60	−21	37	
15	Trayal (R)	39	9	8	22	40	56	−16	35	Relegation to Serbian League
16	Ušće Novi Beograd (R)	39	6	11	22	31	60	−29	29	Relegation to Serbian League

Source: First League (in Serbian)
Rules for classification: 1) Points; 2) Points in regular season; 3) Head-to-head points in regular season; 4) Head-to-head goal difference in regular season; 5) Head-to-head goals scored in regular season; 6) Head-to-head away goals scored in regular season (if two teams tied); 7) Goal difference; 8) Goals scored; 9) Fair play ranking; 10) Drawing of lots.
(R) Relegated

== Top scorers ==
As of matches played on 24 September 2025.

Rank	Player	Club	Goals
1	(United States) Ethan Hoard	Jedinstvo	6
2	(Serbia) Lazar Nikolić	Trayal	5
2	(Bosnia and Herzegovina) Stefan Šavija	Tekstilac	5
3	(Ghana) Issah Abass	Jedinstvo	4
3	(Serbia) Miloš Bakić	Ušće Novi Beograd	4
