= 2026–27 Serbian First League =

Serbian football league season

Serbian First League
- Season: 2026–27
- Dates: 31 July 2026 –
- Matches: 144
- Goals: 381 (2.65 per match)
- Top goalscorer: Irfan Hadžić (9 goals)
- Biggest home win: Metalac 5–0 Dubočica
- Biggest away win: Spartak 0–6 Proleter 023
- Highest scoring: Javor 5–1 Teleoptik; Metalac 2–4 Spartak; Spartak 2–4 Teleoptik; Metalac 2–4 Loznica; Javor 4–2 Proleter 023; Spartak 0–6 Proleter 023; Spartak 3–3 Borac 1926; TSC 5–1 Metalac; Smederevo 1924 1–5 Grafičar
- Longest winning run: Borac 1926 (7 matches)
- Longest unbeaten run: TSC; Javor (15 matches each)
- Longest winless run: Bor 1919 (11 matches)
- Longest losing run: Bor 1919 (11 matches)
- All statistics correct as of 16 November 2026.

The 2026–27 Serbian First League is the 22nd season of the Serbian First League since its establishment. The season began on 31 July 2026. The league features several modern stadiums, including TSC Arena, Lagator, Dubočica and Voždovac Stadium.

== League format ==
Each team plays every other team twice. After the regular season, the top six teams advance to the Championship round, while the remaining ten enter the Relegation round. The top two teams are promoted to the Serbian SuperLiga, and the teams placed 11th to 16th are relegated to the Serbian League.

== Teams ==
The league consists of 16 teams: eight continuing from the previous First League season, four relegated from the 2025–26 Serbian SuperLiga and four promoted from the Serbian League.

Location of teams in the 2026–27 Serbian First League
Locations of Belgrade teams

Team	City	Stadium	Capacity
Bor 1919	Bor	Kraljevica Stadium (Zaječar; temporarily)	8,000
Borac 1926	Čačak	Čačak Stadium	8,000
Dubočica	Leskovac	Dubočica Stadium	8,136
RFK Grafičar	Belgrade	Rajko Mitić Stadium – South Stand Artificial Grass Field	1,000
Javor-Matis	Ivanjica	Stadion kraj Moravice	5,000
Jedinstvo	Ub	Dragan Džajić Stadium	4,000
Loznica	Loznica	Lagator Stadium	8,030
Metalac	Gornji Milanovac	Metalac Stadium	4,500
Napredak	Kruševac	Mladost Stadium	10,331
Proleter 023	Zrenjanin	Karađorđe's Park Stadium	13,500
Smederevo 1924	Smederevo	Smederevo Stadium	17,200
Spartak ŽK	Subotica	Subotica City Stadium	13,000
Teleoptik	Belgrade	Zemunelo	2,000
TSC	Bačka Topola	TSC Arena	4,500
Voždovac	Belgrade	Voždovac Stadium	5,200
OFK Vršac	Vršac	Vršac City Stadium	5,000

=== Team changes ===
Promoted from 2025–26 Serbian League	Relegated from 2025–26 Serbian SuperLiga	Promoted to 2026–27 Serbian SuperLiga	Relegated to 2026–27 Serbian League	Withdrawn
▲ Bor 1919 ▲ Metalac ▲ Proleter 023 ▲ Teleoptik	▼TSC ▼ Spartak ▼ Napredak ▼ Javor	▲ Zemun ▲ Mačva	▼ Ušće Novi Beograd ▼ Trayal ▼FAP ▼ Tekstilac ▼ Kabel	SU Dinamo Jug

== Regular season ==
=== League table ===
Pos	Team	Pld	W	D	L	GF	GA	GD	Pts	Qualification
1	TSC	18	10	7	1	40	20	+20	37	Qualification for the Championship round
2	Borac 1926	18	11	4	3	31	21	+10	37	Qualification for the Championship round
3	Javor	18	9	8	1	41	21	+20	35	Qualification for the Championship round
4	Vršac	18	9	4	5	22	17	+5	31	Qualification for the Championship round
5	Smederevo 1924	18	8	4	6	25	23	+2	28	Qualification for the Championship round
6	Napredak	18	7	5	6	16	17	−1	26	Qualification for the Championship round
7	Dubočica	18	7	5	6	19	22	−3	26	Qualification for the Relegation round
8	Proleter 023	18	6	7	5	28	19	+9	25	Qualification for the Relegation round
9	Spartak	18	6	5	7	26	31	−5	23	Qualification for the Relegation round
10	Voždovac	18	5	6	7	15	15	0	21	Qualification for the Relegation round
11	Loznica	18	4	9	5	21	25	−4	21	Qualification for the Relegation round
12	Metalac	18	5	5	8	20	26	−6	20	Qualification for the Relegation round
13	Grafičar	18	5	3	10	25	30	−5	18	Qualification for the Relegation round
14	Jedinstvo	18	5	3	10	21	29	−8	18	Qualification for the Relegation round
15	Teleoptik	18	4	5	9	23	30	−7	17	Qualification for the Relegation round
16	Bor	18	2	2	14	8	35	−27	8	Qualification for the Relegation round

Updated to match(es) played on 16 November 2026. Source: PrvaLiga (in Serbian)
Rules for classification: 1) Points; 2) Head-to-head points; 3) Head-to-head goal difference; 4) Head-to-head goals scored; 5) Head-to-head away goals scored (if two teams tied); 6) Goal difference; 7) Goals scored; 8) Fair play ranking; 9) Draw.

=== Results ===
Home \ Away	BRC	DUB	GRA	JAV	JED	LOZ	MET	NAP	BOR	PRO	SME	SPA	TEL	TSC	VOZ	VRS
Borac 1926			2–1		3–1	1–1	1–2	0–0		2–1	2–0			2–2	1–0	
Dubočica	0–2			1–1		0–0			1–2	1–4	1–0	2–1	2–0		0–0	
Grafičar		1–4		1–1		2–2		2–0	3–0		1–2	0–2	4–1		0–0	
Javor	3–1				3–0			3–0	3–0	4–2			5–1	2–2	1–1	1–2
Jedinstvo		0–0	3–1			2–3	0–1				2–1	1–1	1–1	2–3		1–3
Loznica	2–3	1–2		2–2					0–0	0–0	1–0	2–0	1–1			1–1
Metalac		5–0	1–0	1–2	1–3	2–4		0–0			0–0	2–4	0–3			
Napredak		1–0	1–0		2–1	3–0	2–1		2–0		1–4			1–2		1–2
Bor	0–1				0–2		0–2	0–1		2–1	0–2	0–1		1–4	2–2	
Proleter 023		2–3	2–1		3–0	1–0	0–0	0–0						1–1	2–1	1–1
Smederevo 1924	3–2		1–5	1–3					4–1	1–1		2–1	1–1		1–0	1–0
Spartak	3–3			2–2			1–1	1–0	3–0	0–6			2–4	2–2	0–2	2–0
Teleoptik	1–2			2–3	0–2			1–1	2–0	1–1		2–0		1–2	1–2	
TSC		0–0	4–1	1–1	2–0	4–0	5–1				1–1					1–0
Voždovac	0–1	0–1	0–1		1–0	1–1	1–0	0–0						2–3		2–0
Vršac	1–2	2–1	4–1	1–1			0–0		1–0	1–0			1–0	2–1		

Updated to match(es) played on 16 November 2026. Source: PrvaLiga (in Serbian)
Legend: Blue = home team win; Yellow = draw; Red = away team win.
For upcoming matches, an "a" indicates there is an article about the rivalry between the two participants.

== Top scorers ==
As of matches played on 16 November 2026.

Rank	Player	Club	Goals
1	(Bosnia and Herzegovina) Irfan Hadžić	Smederevo 1924	9
2	(Serbia) Milan Jevtović	Borac 1926	8
2	(Serbia) Milan Mirosavljev	Javor	8
2	(Serbia) Nemanja Nikolić	TSC	8
5	(Ghana) Richardson Kwaku Denzell	Jedinstvo	7

== See also ==
- 2026–27 Serbian SuperLiga
- 2026–27 Serbian Cup
