= Branko Žigić =

Serbian footballer

Personal information
- Date of birth: 30 December 1981 (age 44)
- Place of birth: Bačka Topola, SFR Yugoslavia
- Height: 1.90 m (6 ft 3 in)
- Position: Centre-back

Youth career
- AIK Bačka Topola

Senior career*
Years	Team	Apps	(Gls)
1998–2003	AIK Bačka Topola		
2004	Tekstilac Odžaci	15	(1)
2004–2007	Cement Beočin	88	(15)
2007–2017	Proleter Novi Sad	264	(19)

Managerial career
- 2019–2021: Proleter Novi Sad
- 2021: Proleter Novi Sad
- 2022: Mladost Novi Sad
- 2022–2023: Novi Sad 1921
- 2023: Mladost Novi Sad
- 2024: Sloven
- * Club domestic league appearances and goals

Branko Žigić (Serbian Cyrillic: Бранко Жигић; born 30 December 1981) is a Serbian professional football coach and a former player who played as a defender. He is the younger brother of Nikola Žigić.

== Career ==
Born in Bačka Topola, Brako started his career together with his older brother Nikola at local club AIK Bačka Topola. Later he played for Tekstilac Odžaci and Cement Beočin.

=== Proleter Novi Sad ===
Žigić joined Proleter Novi Sad for the 2007–08 season. After 2 seasons playing in the Serbian League Vojvodina, Žigić promoted with club in the Serbian First League. Playing with Proleter, Žigić made over 250 caps.

== Career statistics ==
Appearances and goals by club, season and competition
Club	Season	League			Cup		Continental		Total	
Club	Season	Division	Apps	Goals	Apps	Goals	Apps	Goals	Apps	Goals
Tekstilac Odžaci	2003–04	Serbian League Vojvodina	15	1	—		—		15	1
Cement Beočin	2004–05	Serbian League Vojvodina	30	7	—		—		30	7
Cement Beočin	2005–06	Serbian League Vojvodina	29	2	—		—		29	2
Cement Beočin	2006–07	Serbian League Vojvodina	29	6	—		—		29	6
Cement Beočin	Total		88	15	—		—		88	15
Proleter Novi Sad	2007–08	Serbian League Vojvodina	25	1	—		—		25	1
Proleter Novi Sad	2008–09	Serbian League Vojvodina	26	4	—		—		26	4
Proleter Novi Sad	2009–10	Serbian First League	32	1	0	0	—		32	1
Proleter Novi Sad	2010–11	Serbian First League	33	3	1	0	—		34	3
Proleter Novi Sad	2011–12	Serbian First League	29	2	1	0	—		30	2
Proleter Novi Sad	2012–13	Serbian First League	30	1	1	0	—		31	1
Proleter Novi Sad	2013–14	Serbian First League	24	3	1	0	—		25	3
Proleter Novi Sad	2014–15	Serbian First League	28	2	2	0	—		30	2
Proleter Novi Sad	2015–16	Serbian First League	23	1	0	0	—		23	1
Proleter Novi Sad	2016–17	Serbian First League	14	1	0	0	—		14	1
Proleter Novi Sad	Total		264	19	6	0	—		270	19
Career total			367	35	6	0	0	0	373	35

== Managerial statistics ==
As of match played 30 August 2023

Managerial record by team and tenure
Team	From	To	Record					Ref
Team	From	To	G	W	D	L	Win %	Ref
Proleter Novi Sad	9 September 2019	9 April 2021	53	18	14	21	33.96	
Proleter Novi Sad	16 July 2021	10 October 2021	15	4	4	7	26.67	
Mladost Novi Sad	7 July 2022	2 August 2022	4	1	1	2	25.00	
Novi Sad 1921	21 August 2022	23 June 2023	34	14	7	13	41.18	
Total			105	37	25	43	35.24	—

== Honours ==
Proleter Novi Sad

- Serbian League Vojvodina: 2008–09
