= Ljubomir Ristovski =

Serbian football manager and player

Personal information
- Date of birth: 29 November 1969 (age 56)
- Place of birth: Knin, SR Croatia, SFR Yugoslavia
- Position: Defensive midfielder

Youth career
- Vojvodina

Senior career*
Years	Team	Apps	(Gls)
1992–1993	Novi Sad		
1993–1995	Borac Čačak	25	(0)
1995–1996	União da Madeira	26	(0)
1996–1999	Penafiel	74	(3)
1999	Hajduk Kula	13	(0)
1999–2001	Nacional da Madeira	24	(1)
2001–2002	Câmara de Lobos	28	(0)
2002–2003	Santacruzense		
Total		190	(4)

Managerial career
- 2004–2005: Cement Beočin
- 2006–2007: Radnički Sombor
- 2007: Inđija
- 2008: Veternik
- 2009–2010: Proleter Novi Sad
- 2010–2011: Spartak Subotica
- 2011: Vojvodina
- 2011–2012: Novi Pazar
- 2013: Smederevo
- 2013: Donji Srem
- 2015: Kabuscorp
- 2016: Khon Kaen United
- 2018: Navy
- 2019: Sukhothai
- 2021: Zlatibor Čajetina
- 2021–2022: Mladost Novi Sad
- 2022–2023: Mladost Novi Sad
- * Club domestic league appearances and goals

Ljubomir Ristovski (Serbian Cyrillic: Љубомир Ристовски; born 29 November 1969) is a Serbian football manager and former player.

== Playing career ==
After coming through the youth system of Vojvodina, Ristovski played for Novi Sad in the Second League of FR Yugoslavia. He switched to league rivals Borac Čačak in 1993, helping them earn promotion to the First League. In 1995, Ristovski moved abroad to Portugal and signed with União da Madeira. He later went on to play for Penafiel (1996–1999) and Nacional da Madeira (1999–2001).

== Managerial career ==
After hanging up his boots, Ristovski began his managerial career at Cement Beočin in July 2004. He also served as manager of Proleter Novi Sad, before signing with Serbian SuperLiga club Spartak Subotica in December 2010. In June 2011, Ristovski took charge of Vojvodina. He resigned from his position after just two months due to poor results. In September 2011, Ristovski was appointed as manager of Novi Pazar, but was replaced by Dragoljub Bekvalac in April 2012.

== Honours ==
Proleter Novi Sad

- Serbian League Vojvodina: 2008–09

Mladost Novi Sad

- Serbian First League: 2021–22
