= Bogić Bogićević (football manager) =

Serbian football manager and player (1955–2017)

Personal information
- Full name: Bogić Bogićević
- Date of birth: 18 April 1955
- Place of birth: Čačak, PR Serbia, FPR Yugoslavia
- Date of death: 30 January 2017 (aged 61)
- Place of death: Belgrade, Serbia
- Position: Goalkeeper

Youth career
- Borac Čačak

Senior career*
Years	Team	Apps	(Gls)
1975–1978	Borac Čačak	54	(0)
1980–1986	Galenika Zemun	48	(0)

Managerial career
- 2001: Balkan Mirijevo
- 2002: Zemun
- 2003: Radnički Beograd
- 2004: Radnički Obrenovac
- 2006–2007: Inđija
- 2007–2008: Bačinci
- 2010–2011: Radnički Šid
- 2011–2013: Donji Srem
- 2013: Javor Ivanjica
- 2013–2015: Borac Čačak
- 2015–2016: Napredak Kruševac
- * Club domestic league appearances and goals

Bogić Bogićević (Serbian Cyrillic: Богић Богићевић, pronounced [bǒgitɕ bogîtɕeʋitɕ]; 18 April 1955 – 30 January 2017) was a Serbian football manager and player.

== Playing career ==
During his footballing career as a goalkeeper, Bogićević played for his hometown club Borac Čačak during the 1970s, as well as for Zemun during the 1980s, making eight appearances in the Yugoslav First League in the 1982–83 season. He also spent some time with Dinamo Pančevo and Bežanija.

== Managerial career ==
After hanging up his boots, Bogićević started his managerial career as an assistant to Đorđe Gerum. He later served as manager of numerous clubs in his homeland, including Donji Srem and Javor Ivanjica in the Serbian SuperLiga. Subsequently, Bogićević led Borac Čačak (2013–14) and Napredak Kruševac (2015–16), achieving promotion to the top flight with both clubs.

Due to illness he left his position at Napredak to become their sports director but succumbed to his disease a year later.

== Honours ==
Napredak Kruševac

- Serbian First League: 2015–16
