= Vladimir Silađi =

Serbian footballer (born 1993)

Personal information
- Full name: Vladimir Silađi
- Date of birth: 23 April 1993 (age 33)
- Place of birth: Novi Sad, FR Yugoslavia
- Height: 1.76 m (5 ft 9 in)
- Position: Forward

Team information
- Current team: Proleter 023
- Number: 9

Youth career
- Vojvodina

Senior career*
Years	Team	Apps	(Gls)
2011–2012	Vojvodina	1	(0)
2011	→ Proleter Novi Sad (loan)	1	(0)
2012	→ Sloga Temerin (loan)	14	(1)
2012–2014	Sloga Temerin	40	(9)
2014–2015	Timok	27	(7)
2015	ČSK Čelarevo	2	(0)
2016–2021	TSC	147	(62)
2021	Gangwon FC	18	(3)
2021	Gangwon FC B	4	(1)
2022	Hanoi FC	15	(4)
2023	Mladost Lučani	13	(1)
2023	TS Galaxy	2	(0)
2024	Sloboda Užice	16	(2)
2024	Rudar Prijedor	14	(4)
2025	Bokelj	16	(2)
2025–2026	Naftagas Elemir		
2026–	Proleter 023		
- * Club domestic league appearances and goals as of 1 June 2025

Vladimir Silađi (Serbian Cyrillic: Владимир Силађи; born 23 April 1993) is a Serbian professional footballer who plays as a forward for Proleter 023.

== Club career ==
After coming through the youth academy of Vojvodina, Silađi made his first-team debut for the club on 7 May 2011, coming on as a substitute for Giorgi Merebashvili in a 1–1 away draw with Borac Čačak.

In early 2016, Silađi moved to Serbian League Vojvodina side TSC. He helped the club win promotion to the Serbian First League in 2017 and eventually to the Serbian SuperLiga in 2019.

In 2021, Silađi joined K League 1 club Gangwon FC.

In 2022, Silađi moved to V.League 1 side Hanoi FC. He was assigned the squad number 99 and made his debut on 12 March in a 0–0 home draw with Ho Chi Minh City FC. He scored his first goal for the club at the 2022 Vietnamese Cup round of 16 against SHB Da Nang which ended 2–1 for Hanoi. Silađi finished the 2022 campaign with 5 goals in 16 appearances in all competitions. On 5 December, Hanoi FC announced the departure of Silađi after the end of the contract.

== Career statistics ==
As of 4 October 2023

Appearances and goals by club, season and competition
Club	Season	League			Cup		Europe		Other		Total	
Club	Season	Division	Apps	Goals	Apps	Goals	Apps	Goals	Apps	Goals	Apps	Goals
ČSK Čelarevo	2015–16	Serbian First League	2	0	1	0	—		—		3	0
TSC	2015–16	Serbian League Vojvodina	14	5	—		—		—		14	5
TSC	2016–17	Serbian League Vojvodina	24	8	—		—		—		24	8
TSC	2017–18	Serbian First League	27	10	0	0	—		—		27	10
TSC	2018–19	Serbian First League	37	19	1	0	—		—		38	19
TSC	2019–20	Serbian SuperLiga	29	16	1	0	—		—		30	16
TSC	2020–21	Serbian SuperLiga	16	4	1	0	2	0	—		19	4
TSC	Total		147	62	3	0	2	0	—		157	62
Gangwon FC	2021	K League 1	18	3	4	1	—		—		22	5
Hanoi FC	2022	V.League 1	15	4	1	1	—		—		16	5
Mladost Lučani	2022–23	Serbian SuperLiga	13	1	—		—		—		13	1
TS Galaxy	2023–24	South African Premiership	2	0	0	0	—		1	0	3	0
Career total			197	70	9	2	2	0	1	0	209	72

== Honours ==
TSC

- Serbian First League: 2018–19

Hanoi FC

- V.League 1: 2022
- Vietnamese National Cup: 2022

Individual

- Serbian SuperLiga top scorer: 2019–20 (16 goals, shared with Nenad Lukić and Nikola Petković)
