= Mihajlo Butraković =

Serbian footballer (born 2006)

Personal information
- Date of birth: 12 April 2006 (age 20)
- Place of birth: Sremska Mitrovica, Serbia and Montenegro
- Height: 1.77 m (5 ft 10 in)
- Positions: Attacking midfielder; winger

Team information
- Current team: Dinamo Jug
- Number: 20

Youth career
- Vojvodina

Senior career*
Years	Team	Apps	(Gls)
2023–	Vojvodina	2	(0)
2024	→ Kabel (loan)	7	(0)
2025	→ Radnički SM (loan)	12	(0)
2026–	→ Dinamo Jug (loan)	11	(1)

International career^{‡}
2022–	Serbia U17	1	(0)
- * Club domestic league appearances and goals as of 14 May 2026 ‡ National team caps and goals as of 6 September 2022

Mihajlo Butraković (Serbian Cyrillic: Михајло Бутраковић; born 12 April 2006) is a Serbian professional footballer who plays as a midfielder for Serbian First League club SU Dinamo Jug, on loan from Serbian SuperLiga side Vojvodina.

== Club career ==
=== Vojvodina ===
In September 2022, Butraković signed his first professional contract with Vojvodina, penning a three-year deal with the club. On 16 September 2023, Butraković made his first-team debut, replacing Marko Bjeković in 73rd minute of 0:2 away loss to Spartak Subotica. On 10 November 2023, Butraković signed a new three-year contract with the club.

== Career statistics ==
As of 21 March 2026

Club	Season	League			Cup		Continental		Total	
Club	Season	Division	Apps	Goals	Apps	Goals	Apps	Goals	Apps	Goals
Vojvodina	2023–24	Serbian SuperLiga	2	0	1	0	—		3	0
Vojvodina	2024–25	Serbian SuperLiga	0	0	0	0	0	0	0	0
Vojvodina	Total		2	0	1	0	0	0	3	0
Kabel (loan)	2024–25	Serbian League Vojvodina	7	0	0	0	—		7	0
Radnički SM (loan)	2024–25	Serbian First League	11	0	—		—		11	0
SU Dinamo Jug (loan)	2025–26	Serbian First League	3	1	—		—		3	1
Career total			23	1	1	0	0	0	24	1
