= Slobodan Dinčić =

Serbian footballer

Personal information
- Date of birth: 7 August 1982 (age 44)
- Place of birth: Belgrade, SFR Yugoslavia
- Height: 1.96 m (6 ft 5 in)
- Position: Striker

Youth career
- 1989–2001: Čukarički

Senior career*
Years	Team	Apps	(Gls)
2002–2007	Čukarički	11	(0)
2003–2004	→ Komgrap (loan)	20	(2)
2005–2006	→ Lokomotiva Beograd (loan)	18	(11)
2006–2007	→ Chicago Fire (loan)	0	(0)
2007	Lokomotiva Beograd	9	(5)
2008	Leotar	11	(1)
2008	Radnički Nova Pazova	3	(0)
2009–2010	Srem Jakovo	34	(23)
2010–2011	BASK	30	(21)
2011–2012	Santa Clara	17	(1)
2012–2013	Čukarički	35	(15)
2014	Metalac Gornji Milanovac	11	(4)
2014	Thanh Hóa	4	(1)
2014–2015	Javor Ivanjica	22	(5)
2015	Kolubara	11	(2)
2016	Zemun	4	(0)
2016–2017	Grbalj	10	(1)
2017	Lokomotiva Beograd		
2017–2018	Ponsacco		
- * Club domestic league appearances and goals

Slobodan Dinčić (Serbian Cyrillic: Слободан Динчић; born 7 August 1982) is a Serbian retired footballer who played as a striker.

== Club career ==
Born in Belgrade, SR Serbia, Dinčić had a very diversified career with mixed success. He started playing football when he joined the youth team of FK Čukarički in 1989. He joined the first team in 2002, but his debut as senior happened in the season 2003–04 when he played on loan at another Belgrade club, FK Komgrap, in the third league. In the following season he will return to Čukarički and make his debut in the 2004–05 First League of Serbia and Montenegro.

In 2006, he moved abroad by joining on loan Chicago Fire. but has failed to debut for the first team in the league competition. After one year in the States, he returned to Serbia and joined FK Lokomotiva Beograd, playing back then in the third level, the Serbian League Belgrade. During the winter break he made tests in Poland with Polonia Bytom and Zagłębie Sosnowiec, however he ended up playing the second half of the 2007–08 season with FK Leotar in the 2007–08 Premier League of Bosnia and Herzegovina. At the end of the season, in summer 2008, he returned to Serbia and joined third level FK Radnički Nova Pazova. During the following winter break he moved to another Serbian club, FK Srem Jakovo where he will play one and a half years, scoring a total of 23 goals in 34 league matches. This called the attention of FK BASK who brought him in summer 2010. With BASK he was the champion of the 2010–11 Serbian First League and with 21 goals he became the league top scorer.

As champions of the First League, BASK should have been promoted to the Serbian SuperLiga, however, they ceded their place to FK Novi Pazar for financial reasons. Numerous players of BASK were also allowed to join Novi Pazar, however Dinčić decided to accept a move to second level Portuguese side C.D. Santa Clara and signed a two-year deal with the club. The Azorean club finished the 2011–12 Liga de Honra in 12th place, however Dinčić left the club. In summer 2012, he joined Slovenian First League side NK Domžale but after spending most of the pre-season, after approximately one month since he came, he left by accepting a call from his former club FK Čukarički, playing now in the 2012–13 Serbian First League.

=== Thanh Hóa ===
In Fall of 2014, Slobodan joined Thanh Hóa of the Vietnamese V.League 1.

== Honours ==
BASK

- Serbian First League: 2010–11

Individual

- Serbian First League top scorer: 2010–11
