= Bogdan Stojković =

Serbian association football player

Personal information
- Date of birth: 14 October 2002 (age 24)
- Position: Midfielder

Youth career
- Radnik Surdulica

Senior career*
Years	Team	Apps	(Gls)
2020–2024	Radnik Surdulica	10	(0)
2020–2021	→ Alakince Surdulica (loan)		
2021–2022	→ Hajduk Veljko Negotin (loan)		
2022	→ Car Konstantin (loan)		
2024–2025	Dinamo Jug		
- * Club domestic league appearances and goals as of 27 December 2023

Bogdan Stojković (Serbian Cyrillic: Богдан Стојковић, born 14 October 2002) is a Serbian footballer who most recently played as a midfielder for Dinamo Jug.

== Career statistics ==
=== Club ===
As of 13 June 2020.

Club	Season	League			Cup		Continental		Other		Total	
Club	Season	Division	Apps	Goals	Apps	Goals	Apps	Goals	Apps	Goals	Apps	Goals
Radnik Surdulica	2019–20	Serbian SuperLiga	1	0	0	0	0	0	0	0	1	0
Career total			1	0	0	0	0	0	0	0	1	0
