= Milan Spremo =

Serbian footballer

Personal information
- Full name: Milan Spremo
- Date of birth: 27 April 1995 (age 31)
- Place of birth: Novi Sad, FR Yugoslavia
- Height: 1.75 m (5 ft 9 in)
- Positions: Left-back; left midfielder

Team information
- Current team: Dinamo Jug
- Number: 16

Youth career
- –2012: Vojvodina

Senior career*
Years	Team	Apps	(Gls)
2012–2015	Vojvodina	7	(0)
2013	→ Sloga Petrovac (loan)	12	(1)
2014–2015	→ Proleter Novi Sad (loan)	26	(1)
2015–2016	Celje	27	(2)
2016	Javor Ivanjica	15	(0)
2017	Vojvodina	10	(1)
2017–2018	Bačka Palanka	18	(1)
2018	Kokand 1912	10	(0)
2018–2019	Bačka Palanka	21	(0)
2019–2022	Napredak Kruševac	94	(2)
2022–2023	Borac Banja Luka	12	(1)
2023	ŁKS Łódź	10	(0)
2023–2024	Wisła Płock	13	(0)
2024–2025	IMT	3	(0)
2025	Igman Konjic	14	(0)
2025–	Dinamo Jug	23	(3)

International career
2011–2012	Serbia U17	6	(1)
2012–2014	Serbia U19	3	(0)
2015	Serbia U20	1	(0)
- * Club domestic league appearances and goals as of 14 May 2026

Milan Spremo (Serbian Cyrillic: Милан Спремо; born 27 April 1995) is a Serbian professional footballer who plays as either a left-back or left midfielder for Dinamo Jug, whom he joined from Bosnian Premier League club Igman Konjic.

== Career ==
Spremo made his professional debut for Vojvodina, under coach Dejan Vukićević. On 7 April 2012 he played 45 minutes in 2–0 home loss against Rad.

== Honours ==
Vojvodina

- Serbian Cup: 2013–14

ŁKS Łódź

- I liga: 2022–23
