= Miloš Petrović (footballer) =

Serbian footballer

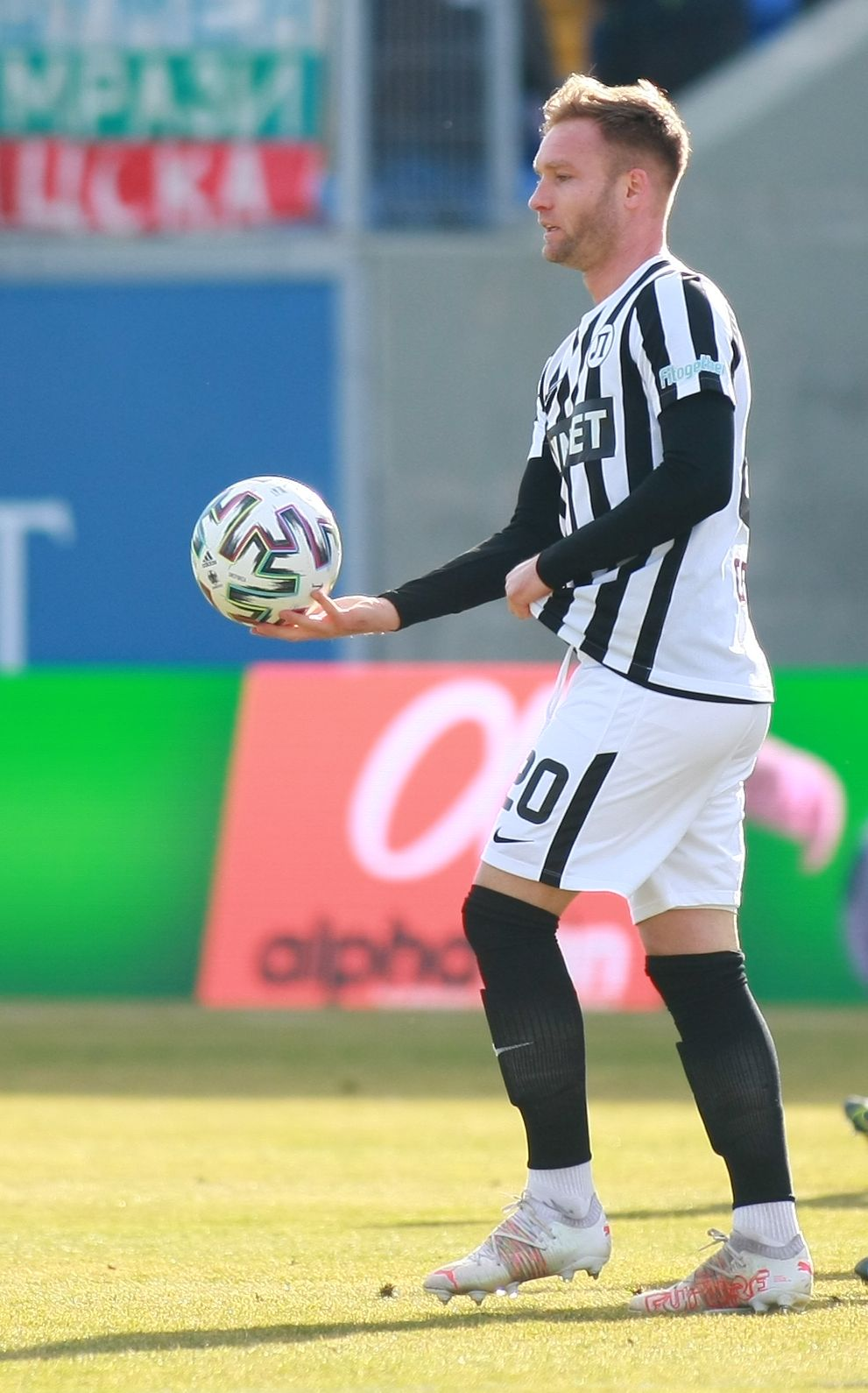

Personal information
- Full name: Miloš Petrović
- Date of birth: 5 May 1990 (age 36)
- Place of birth: Niš, SFR Yugoslavia
- Height: 1.80 m (5 ft 11 in)
- Position: Right back

Team information
- Current team: Dinamo Jug
- Number: 14

Youth career
- 2006–2007: Radnički Niš

Senior career*
Years	Team	Apps	(Gls)
2007–2018	Radnički Niš	202	(3)
2018–2020	Lokomotiv Plovdiv	61	(0)
2021	Xanthi	18	(0)
2021–2025	Lokomotiv Plovdiv	60	(2)
2025	Hebar	15	(0)
2025-	Dinamo Jug	29	(0)
- * Club domestic league appearances and goals as of 14 May 2026

Miloš Petrović (Serbian Cyrillic: Милош Петровић; born 5 May 1990) is a Serbian professional footballer who plays as a defender for Dinamo Jug.

== Career ==
Petrović began his career at Radnički Niš, where he played over 200 games between 2007 and 2018. After eleven seasons at Radnički he left to join Bulgarian First League club Lokomotiv Plovdiv on 16 July 2018. With Lokomotiv, he won the 2018–19 and the 2019–20 Bulgarian Cup.

== Career statistics ==
As of 14 December 2020

Club	Season	League		Cup		Continental		Total	
Club	Season	Apps	Goals	Apps	Goals	Apps	Goals	Apps	Goals
Radnički Niš	2007–08	4	0	0	0	0	0	4	0
Radnički Niš	2009–10	15	0	0	0	0	0	15	0
Radnički Niš	2011–12	22	0	1	0	0	0	23	0
Radnički Niš	2012–13	27	0	1	0	0	0	28	0
Radnički Niš	2013–14	24	0	2	0	0	0	26	0
Radnički Niš	2014–15	24	0	2	0	0	0	26	0
Radnički Niš	2015–16	29	0	1	0	0	0	30	0
Radnički Niš	2016–17	33	2	0	0	0	0	34	2
Radnički Niš	2017–18	24	1	0	0	0	0	24	1
Radnički Niš	Total	202	3	7	0	0	0	209	3
Lokomotiv Plovdiv	2018–19	24	0	4	0	0	0	28	0
Lokomotiv Plovdiv	2019–20	22	0	5	0	4	0	31	0
Lokomotiv Plovdiv	2020–21	15	0	2	0	2	0	19	0
Lokomotiv Plovdiv	Total	61	0	11	0	6	0	78	0
Career statistics		263	3	18	0	6	0	287	3

== Honours ==
=== Club ===
Lokomotiv Plovdiv

- Bulgarian Cup (2): 2018–19, 2019–20
- Bulgarian Supercup: 2020
