= Goran Bošković (footballer, born 1976) =

Serbian football manager and player

Personal information
- Full name: Goran Bošković
- Date of birth: 11 October 1976 (age 50)
- Place of birth: Belgrade, SFR Yugoslavia
- Height: 1.81 m (5 ft 11 in)
- Position: Midfielder

Senior career*
Years	Team	Apps	(Gls)
1995–1996	Mladost Lučani	31	(0)
1996–1999	Red Star Belgrade	39	(0)
1999–2000	Sutjeska Nikšić	36	(2)
2000–2001	Siirt Jetpaspor	19	(0)
2001–2002	Remont Čačak	18	(1)
2002–2004	Sutjeska Nikšić	62	(2)
2005	Radnički Obrenovac	13	(0)
2005	Irtysh Pavlodar	15	(0)
2006	Kairat	15	(0)
2007	Zemun	14	(0)
2008	Atyrau	10	(0)
2008–2009	Radnički Obrenovac	30	(1)
2010	Mladost Lučani	16	(0)
2010–2014	Radnički Nova Pazova	88	(0)
Total		406	(6)

Managerial career
- 2021: Radnički Nova Pazova
- * Club domestic league appearances and goals

Goran Bošković (Serbian Cyrillic: Горан Бошковић; born 11 October 1976) is a Serbian football manager and former player.

== Playing career ==
After playing for Mladost Lučani, Bošković spent three seasons with Red Star Belgrade from 1996 to 1999, winning two national cup trophies. He later played professionally in Turkey and Kazakhstan.

== Managerial career ==
Bošković briefly served as manager of Radnički Nova Pazova in 2021.

== Honours ==
Red Star Belgrade

- FR Yugoslavia Cup: 1996–97, 1998–99
