= 2008–09 Serbian League Vojvodina =

== League table ==
Pos	Team	Pld	W	D	L	GF	GA	GD	Pts	Promotion or relegation
1	FK Proleter Novi Sad	30	17	10	3	49	21	+28	61	Promoted to First league of Serbia
2	FK Radnički Sombor	30	17	4	9	47	37	+10	55	Playoff for promotion
3	FK Mladost Bački Jarak	30	15	10	5	46	33	+13	55	
4	FK Big Bull	30	14	8	8	48	35	+13	50	
5	FK Palić	30	13	9	8	38	30	+8	48	
6	FK Senta	30	13	8	9	46	40	+6	47	
7	FK Radnički Nova Pazova	30	11	9	10	44	33	+11	42	
8	OFK Kikinda	30	11	10	9	52	41	+11	42 (Note: 1 point deducted)	
9	FK Radnički Šid	30	11	8	11	41	34	+7	41	
10	FK Vršac	30	10	7	13	40	40	0	37	
11	FK Bačka	30	11	7	12	35	45	−10	37 (Note: 3 points deducted)	
12	FK Metalac Futog	30	8	11	11	31	38	−7	35	
13	FK Sloga Temerin	30	7	13	10	34	40	−6	34	
14	FK Spartak Debeljača	30	7	12	11	43	48	−5	33	
15	FK Tekstilac Odžaci	30	5	6	19	37	60	−23	21	
16	FK Sloven Ruma	30	2	4	24	28	84	−56	10	Relegated to regional leagues
