= Vladan Milosavljev =

Serbian footballer

Personal information
- Date of birth: 1 February 1987 (age 39)
- Place of birth: Belgrade, SFR Yugoslavia
- Height: 1.72 m (5 ft 7 1/2 in)
- Position: Winger

Team information
- Current team: Ušće Novi Beograd
- Number: 20

Youth career
- Rad

Senior career*
Years	Team	Apps	(Gls)
2004–2006	Rad	18	(2)
2006–2008	Red Star Belgrade	2	(0)
2006–2007	→ Rad (loan)	10	(1)
2007	→ Vardar (loan)	12	(3)
2008	→ Hajduk Kula (loan)	5	(0)
2008–2012	Karviná	99	(18)
2012	→ Viktoria Žižkov (loan)	12	(0)
2012–2013	Baník Ostrava	33	(3)
2014–2015	Levadiakos	38	(6)
2016	Borac Banja Luka	10	(2)
2016–2017	OFI Crete	27	(7)
2017	Apollon Pontus	3	(0)
2018	Trikala	18	(1)
2018	Luftëtari	18	(1)
2019	Tyumen	12	(2)
2019–2020	Inđija	24	(2)
2020–2021	Kolubara	23	(7)
2021–2022	Inđija	33	(11)
2022–2023	Novi Sad 1921	31	(2)
2023–2024	Zvezdara	28	(12)
2024–2025	Ušće Novi Beograd	26	(11)
2025	IMT	1	(0)
2025–	Ušće Novi Beograd	26	(7)
- * Club domestic league appearances and goals as of 13 May 2026

Vladan Milosavljev (Serbian Cyrillic: Владан Милосављев; born 1 February 1987) is a Serbian footballer who plays as a winger for Ušće Novi Beograd.

== Club career ==
He came to Ostrava in July 2012. He made his debut for FC Baník Ostrava against FK Baumit Jablonec on 28 July 2012.

On 29 December 2017 he joined Trikala. On 6 January 2018 he made his debut and scored a late winner in an away match against Veria.

On 30 June 2021, he returned to Inđija.
