= Božidar Urošević =

Serbian footballer

Personal information
- Full name: Božidar Urošević
- Date of birth: 9 February 1975 (age 51)
- Place of birth: Pristina, SFR Yugoslavia
- Height: 1.93 m (6 ft 4 in)
- Position: Goalkeeper

Youth career
- 1988–1993: Priština

Senior career*
Years	Team	Apps	(Gls)
1993–1995	Priština	3	(0)
1995–1996	Radnički Niš	0	(0)
1996–1997	Palilulac Beograd	31	(0)
1997–1999	Roeselare	6	(0)
1999–2001	Rot-Weiß Oberhausen	1	(0)
2001–2002	Harelbeke	14	(0)
2002–2003	Hajduk Beograd	30	(0)
2003	Željezničar Sarajevo	6	(0)
2004	Borac Čačak	15	(0)
2004	AEP Paphos	5	(0)
2005	Borac Čačak	15	(0)
2005–2006	Smederevo	12	(0)
2006–2008	Hajduk Beograd	47	(0)
2008–2009	Laktaši	25	(0)
2009–2010	Sloga Kraljevo	33	(0)
2011	Srem Jakovo	15	(0)
2011–2012	Radnički Nova Pazova	28	(0)
Total		286	(0)

Managerial career
- 2013–2014: Radnički Nova Pazova
- * Club domestic league appearances and goals

Božidar Urošević (Serbian Cyrillic: Божидар Урошевић; born 9 February 1975) is a Serbian retired footballer who played as a goalkeeper. After finishing his career, he became goalkeeping coach.

== Career ==
He started his career playing in the youth squads of his home town FK Priština. In 1995, he moved to First League of FR Yugoslavia club Radnički Niš. He also played one season in the lower league FK Palilulac Beograd, before moving, in 1997, to Belgium to play in SV Roeselare for two seasons. In 1999, he moved to Germany to play in the 2. Bundesliga club Rot-Weiß Oberhausen, but after one season, was back to Belgium, now to play in RC Harelbeke, a club that changed name to K.R.C. Zuid-West-Vlaanderen. In 2002, he was back to Serbia, this time to Second League club Hajduk Beograd before, in 2003, moving to Bosnia and Herzegovina club FK Željezničar from Sarajevo. After half a season there, he moved back to Serbia to play in the First League club Borac Čačak, then moved to Cyprus for a short spell with AEP Paphos before returning to Borac. He then played for one season with FK Smederevo. In 2006, he rejoined Hajduk Beograd, where he stayed until 2008. Then he moved to Premier League of Bosnia and Herzegovina, Bosnian-Serb club FK Laktaši. In 2009, with 34 years, decided to return to Serbia, and signed with FK Sloga Kraljevo.

After finishing his playing career, he became goalkeeping coach. After working in FK Rad, he moved to another Serbian SuperLiga side, FK Voždovac during the winter break of the 2014–15 season.

== Personal life ==
Next to his football success, he also got a bachelor's degree in "Physical preparation of football players" which he was finished in 2002 at the University of Priština. He is married to Marijana Urosevic, and a father of son Stefan, and two daughters Tara and Violeta and lives in Belgrade.
