= FK Bačinci =

Serbian football club

Bačinci
- Full name: Fudbalski Klub Bačinci
- Founded: 1963; 63 years ago
- Dissolved: 2010 (merged with Radnički Šid)
- Ground: Stadion Bačinci
- Capacity: 2,000
- 2009–10: Serbian League Vojvodina, 1st of 16 (promoted)
Home colours	Away colours

FK Bačinci (Serbian Cyrillic: ФК Бачинци) was a football club based in Bačinci, Vojvodina, Serbia. They achieved their best results under the sponsorship name Big Bull, before merging with Radnički Šid in 2010.

== History ==
In the NATO bombing-shortened 1998–99 season, the club finished second in the Serbian League Vojvodina and earned promotion to the Second League of FR Yugoslavia. They spent the next four years in the second tier (Group North), being relegated back to the Serbian League Vojvodina in 2003. Later on, the club participated in the 2008–09 Serbian Cup, being eliminated to Vojvodina in the first round. They subsequently won the Serbian League Vojvodina in the 2009–10 season. In June 2010, the club merged with Radnički Šid to compete under the name Big Bull Radnički in the 2010–11 Serbian First League.

== Honours ==
- Serbian League Vojvodina (tier-III)
  - Champions (1): 2009–10

== Managerial history ==
Period	Name
2007-2008	(Serbia) Bogić Bogićević
