= Zoran Govedarica =

Serbian footballer and manager

Personal information
- Full name: Zoran Govedarica
- Date of birth: 14 April 1968 (age 58)
- Place of birth: Novi Sad, SR Serbia, SFR Yugoslavia
- Position: Defender

Senior career*
Years	Team	Apps	(Gls)
1978–1987	Radnički Sutjeska		
1987–1992	Novi Sad		
1992–1993	AIK Bačka Topola		
1993–2005	Cement Beočin		
2005–2007	ČSK Čelarevo		
2007–2009	Novi Sad		

Managerial career
- 2010–2011: Novi Sad
- 2011: Proleter Novi Sad
- 2011–2013: Inđija
- 2013–2014: Dolina Padina
- 2014–2015: Proleter Novi Sad
- 2015: Donji Srem
- 2015: Kolubara
- 2016: Sloga Petrovac
- 2016: Proleter Novi Sad
- 2016: Novi Pazar
- 2016–2017: Bačka Palanka
- 2017: Proleter Novi Sad
- 2018: Grbalj
- 2018: Budućnost Podgorica
- 2019: Bačka Palanka
- 2019–2020: OFK Titograd
- 2021: Rudar Pljevlja
- * Club domestic league appearances and goals

Zoran Govedarica (Serbian Cyrillic: Зоран Говедарица; born 14 April 1968) is a Serbian football manager and former player. He began his head coaching career in 2010 and has since had stints in Serbia and Montenegro. He played as a defender for several clubs, being the most important Novi Sad and later Cement Beočin.

== Playing career ==
Govedarica started his football career in Radnički Sutjeska in 1978, and was considered as one of the most promising players on the football fields of Serbia. He also played for Novi Sad, AIK Bačka Topola, Cement Beočin, ČSK Čelarevo. He ended his playing career in 2009. in Novi Sad. He is a record holder in the number of matches played in the federal competition rank.

== Personal life ==
Govedarica has not been able to see with his right eye since birth, which prevented him from signing for the German Bundesliga club Mainz. He is the older brother of Dejan Govedarica, who was a member of the Yugoslavia national football team.
