= Đorđe Đurić (footballer) =

Serbian footballer

Personal information
- Date of birth: 10 August 1991 (age 35)
- Place of birth: Belgrade, SR Serbia, SFR Yugoslavia
- Height: 1.86 m (6 ft 1 in)
- Position: Centre-back

Team information
- Current team: Ušće Novi Beograd
- Number: 33

Youth career
- Red Star Belgrade

Senior career*
| Years | Team | Apps | (Gls) |
| 2009–2012 | Red Star Belgrade | 0 | (0) |
| 2009–2010 | → Sopot (loan) | 39 | (0) |
| 2012 | → Rad (loan) | 0 | (0) |
| 2012 | → Spartak Subotica (loan) | 1 | (0) |
| 2012 | Ashdod | 0 | (0) |
| 2012–2013 | MTK Budapest | 0 | (0) |
| 2013 | → Tatabánya (loan) | 15 | (2) |
| 2013–2016 | Rudar Pljevlja | 65 | (5) |
| 2016 | → Čukarički (loan) | 12 | (1) |
| 2016–2019 | Čukarički | 42 | (1) |
| 2019–2021 | Vojvodina | 18 | (0) |
| 2021–2022 | Kolubara | 17 | (0) |
| 2022–2023 | Grafičar | 19 | (2) |
| 2023–2024 | Inđija | 4 | (0) |
| 2024 | Vojvodina | 0 | (0) |
| 2024–2025 | → Kabel (loan) | 20 | (0) |
| 2026– | Ušće Novi Beograd | 8 | (0) |
- * Club domestic league appearances and goals as of 14 May 2026

Đorđe Đurić (Serbian Cyrillic: Ђорђе Ђурић; born 10 August 1991) is a Serbian professional footballer who plays as a defender for Ušće Novi Beograd.

After 3 seasons in FK Čukarički, On 1 July 2019 Đurić signed for another Serbian SuperLiga club, Vojvodina.

== Honours ==
Vojvodina

- Serbian Cup: 2019–20
