= 2012–13 Serbian First League =

Serbian First League
- Season: 2012–13
- Champions: Napredak Kruševac
- Matches played: 306
- Goals scored: 688 (2.25 per match)
- Top goalscorer: Milanko Rašković (19 goals)
- Biggest home win: Borac Čačak 7–0 Novi Sad (18 May 2013)
- Biggest away win: Banat Zrenjanin 0–4 Voždovac (15 September 2012); Banat Zrenjanin 0–4 Napredak Kruševac (10 November 2012); Novi Sad 0–4 Jedinstvo Užice (31 March 2013); Novi Sad 0–4 Proleter Novi Sad (1 May 2013); Novi Sad 0–4 Mladost Lučani (1 June 2013)
- Highest scoring: Proleter Novi Sad 5–3 Radnički Nova Pazova (6 June 2013)

The 2012–13 Serbian First League was the eighth season of the league under its current name. It started on 11 August 2012 and concluded on 5 June 2013.

Napredak Kruševac won the title and Čukarički finished as runners-up, with both clubs earning promotion to the top flight. The third-placed Voždovac was later administratively promoted to the Serbian SuperLiga to fill the vacant spot left by the dissolution of Hajduk Kula, which saw Teleoptik avoid relegation.

Radnički Nova Pazova, Banat Zrenjanin, Mladenovac, Kolubara and Novi Sad were relegated to their respective Serbian League groups.

== 2012–13 teams ==
Location of teams in the 2012–13 Serbian First league

Team	City	Stadium	Capacity
Banat	Zrenjanin	Stadion Karađorđev park	13,000
Bežanija	Belgrade	Bežanija Stadium	5,000
Borac	Čačak	Čačak Stadium	5,000
Čukarički	Belgrade	Čukarički Stadium	7,000
Inđija	Inđija	Inđija Stadium	4,500
Jedinstvo	Užice	Stadion Krčagovo	1,500
Kolubara	Lazarevac	Kolubara Stadium	2,000
Metalac	Gornji Milanovac	Stadion Metalac	4,400
Mladenovac	Mladenovac	Stadion Selters	4,000
Mladost	Lučani	Mladost Stadium	8,000
Napredak	Kruševac	Mladost Stadium	10,811
Novi Sad	Novi Sad	Detelinara Stadium	5,000
Proleter	Novi Sad	Stadion Slana Bara	2,000
Radnički	Nova Pazova	Nova Pazova City Stadium	3,000
Sloga	Kraljevo	Kraljevo City Stadium	5,000
Teleoptik	Zemun	SC Partizan-Teleoptik	5,000
Timok	Zaječar	Zaječar City Stadium	9,000
Voždovac	Belgrade	Voždovac Stadium	6,000

== League table ==
Pos	Team	Pld	W	D	L	GF	GA	GD	Pts	Promotion or relegation
1	Napredak Kruševac (C, P)	34	25	5	4	74	25	+49	80	Promotion to Serbian SuperLiga
2	Čukarički (P)	34	19	10	5	52	26	+26	67	Promotion to Serbian SuperLiga
3	Voždovac (P)	34	17	12	5	49	22	+27	63	Promotion to Serbian SuperLiga
4	Proleter Novi Sad	34	16	9	9	53	43	+10	57	
5	Metalac Gornji Milanovac	34	17	5	12	48	32	+16	56	
6	Jedinstvo Užice	34	15	11	8	40	32	+8	56	
7	Borac Čačak	34	16	6	12	47	25	+22	54	
8	Bežanija	34	11	11	12	41	32	+9	44	
9	Mladost Lučani	34	10	13	11	31	35	−4	43	
10	Sloga Kraljevo	34	10	13	11	32	39	−7	43	
11	Timok	34	11	10	13	37	48	−11	43	
12	Inđija	34	10	12	12	27	35	−8	42	
13	Teleoptik	34	8	12	14	25	43	−18	36	
14	Radnički Nova Pazova (R)	34	9	8	17	35	44	−9	35	Relegation to Serbian League
15	Banat Zrenjanin (R)	34	9	8	17	29	47	−18	35	Relegation to Serbian League
16	Mladenovac (R)	34	8	8	18	21	41	−20	32	Relegation to Serbian League
17	Kolubara (R)	34	6	9	19	30	48	−18	27	Relegation to Serbian League
18	Novi Sad (R)	34	5	6	23	17	71	−54	21	Relegation to Serbian League

Source: srbijasport.net
Rules for classification: 1) points; 2) head-to-head points; 3) head-to-head goal difference; 4) head-to-head goals scored; 5) goal difference; 6) number of goals scored.
(C) Champions; (P) Promoted; (R) Relegated

== Results ==
Home \ Away	BAN	BEŽ	BOR	ČUK	INĐ	JPU	KOL	MET	MLD	MLA	NAP	NSD	PNS	RNP	SKR	TLO	TMK	VŽD
Banat Zrenjanin		2–1	1–0	1–0	0–0	0–1	1–0	1–2	2–0	0–2	0–4	3–0	4–0	1–1	2–2	2–0	0–0	0–4
Bežanija	4–1		0–1	0–1	1–0	1–2	1–1	1–3	6–1	1–0	0–0	3–1	3–0	3–1	2–0	1–0	1–1	0–0
Borac Čačak	2–0	2–1		1–0	1–0	3–1	4–1	1–0	3–0	5–1	1–0	7–0	1–2	3–0	0–0	1–1	2–0	1–0
Čukarički	2–0	0–0	1–0		1–0	2–0	2–1	0–0	1–0	4–1	0–0	1–2	3–3	1–2	4–1	2–0	2–1	2–0
Inđija	0–0	1–0	1–1	2–2		0–1	1–0	2–1	2–1	2–2	0–2	4–2	0–2	1–0	0–0	4–1	2–0	1–1
Jedinstvo Užice	2–0	1–2	1–0	1–1	2–0		3–1	0–0	1–1	0–0	1–1	2–1	2–1	1–0	2–1	2–1	0–0	1–2
Kolubara	2–1	0–0	1–1	0–2	0–2	1–1		3–0	2–0	0–0	2–2	4–0	2–2	3–1	0–0	0–1	2–3	0–2
Metalac Gornji Milanovac	3–1	1–1	1–0	0–3	3–0	2–0	3–0		1–0	3–1	0–3	2–0	1–0	4–0	2–0	2–1	5–0	0–2
Mladenovac	1–1	1–0	1–0	1–2	0–0	0–1	1–0	2–1		0–1	2–3	0–1	2–1	0–0	0–0	1–0	2–1	1–1
Mladost Lučani	1–1	1–1	1–0	0–1	1–0	1–2	1–0	0–0	1–0		0–1	0–0	1–1	1–0	2–0	1–0	0–0	1–1
Napredak Kruševac	3–2	3–2	2–1	1–2	4–0	3–0	3–0	2–1	4–1	4–1		3–0	3–0	1–0	5–0	4–1	2–0	2–1
Novi Sad	2–0	0–1	0–0	0–2	0–0	0–4	0–2	0–0	0–0	0–4	1–2		0–4	3–0	2–1	0–0	1–2	1–3
Proleter Novi Sad	2–0	1–0	2–1	3–2	0–0	2–1	3–1	2–1	1–0	2–1	0–2	2–0		5–3	2–0	2–2	5–2	0–0
Radnički Nova Pazova	0–0	2–1	0–1	1–2	0–1	1–0	1–0	0–1	1–2	1–1	0–0	3–0	1–1		2–2	4–0	4–0	0–2
Sloga Kraljevo	1–0	2–2	1–1	1–1	0–0	2–2	3–1	2–0	1–0	0–0	1–0	4–0	1–0	1–0		2–0	1–2	1–0
Teleoptik	0–1	0–0	2–1	0–0	1–1	0–0	0–0	2–1	1–0	1–0	1–3	1–0	2–2	1–1	2–1		1–0	1–1
Timok	3–1	1–0	2–1	2–2	2–0	2–2	2–0	0–3	0–0	2–2	0–1	4–0	1–0	1–2	0–0	2–0		0–0
Voždovac	2–0	1–1	1–0	1–1	3–0	0–0	1–0	2–1	1–0	2–1	4–1	3–0	0–0	0–3	3–0	1–1	4–1	

Source: srbijasport.net
Legend: Blue = home team win; Yellow = draw; Red = away team win.

== Top scorers ==
Pos	Scorer	Team	Goals
1	(Serbia) Milanko Rašković	Borac Čačak	19
2	(Serbia) Nenad Mirosavljević	Napredak Kruševac	18
3	(Serbia) Slobodan Dinčić	Čukarički	15
4	(Serbia) Nenad Gavrić	Napredak Kruševac	14
5	(Serbia) Darko Drinić	Proleter Novi Sad	13
6	(Serbia) Nikola Ćirković	Metalac Gornji Milanovac	12
7	(Serbia) Petar Bojić	Napredak Kruševac	10
7	(Serbia) Predrag Živadinović	Metalac Gornji Milanovac	10
7	(Serbia) Jovan Jovanović	Sloga Kraljevo	10
10	(Serbia) Srđan Dimitrov	Inđija	9
10	(Bosnia and Herzegovina) Nermin Haskić	Voždovac	9
