= AUX (company) =

Chinese electronics company

- Founded: 1986; 40 years ago
- Headquarters: Ningbo, Zhejiang, China
- Key people: Zheng Jianjiang
- Number of employees: 31,413 (2023)

AUX
- Simplified Chinese: 奥克斯
- Traditional Chinese: 奧克斯
Transcriptions
Standard Mandarin
- Hanyu Pinyin: ào kè sī

AUX is a Chinese company founded in 1986 and listed in China's top 500 enterprises. As of 2022, the company's annual operating revenue reached CNY81 billion, with total assets of CNY62.5 billion. It has over 30,000 employees and operates 11 manufacturing bases and 6 R&D centers worldwide.

The company has three listed companies, Sanxing Medical (SSE: 601567), AUX International (SEHK: 2080), and AUX Electric (SEHK: 2580).

The company has an annual capacity of 7 million air conditioners, 25 million electric meters, 6 million kVA transformers, 5 million mobile phones, and 2 million small home appliances (OEM), Aux air conditioner is the top four in China's air conditioner industry.

== History ==
In 1989, entered the instrument business and founded the Sanxing brand. entered the air conditioner industry in 1994 when he founded the Aux brand, which today ranks among the top three in China's air conditioner market.

In 2015, overseas factories were set up in Brazil and Indonesia. At the same time, an overseas real estate company was also established in Australia, and the company's shares in Hong Kong Stock Exchange has been renamed Aux International.
