= FK Radnički Nova Pazova =

Serbian football club

Radnički Nova Pazova
- Full name: Fudbalski Klub Radnički Nova Pazova
- Founded: 1946; 80 years ago
- Ground: Nova Pazova City Stadium
- Capacity: 2,000
- President: Boško Grbović
- Head coach: Stevo Dragišić
- League: Vojvodina League South
- 2024–25: Vojvodina League South, 4th of 16
Home colours	Away colours

FK Radnički Nova Pazova (Serbian Cyrillic: ФК Раднички Нова Пазова) is a football club based in Nova Pazova, Vojvodina, Serbia. They compete in the Vojvodina League South, the fourth tier of the national league system.

== History ==
After spending nine seasons in the Serbian League Vojvodina, the club finished as champions in the 2011–12 season and earned promotion to the Serbian First League. They were relegated back to the third tier after just one season. In November 2016, the club marked its 70th anniversary. They suffered relegation to the Vojvodina League South in 2019, dropping into the fourth tier for the first time in 16 years.

== Honours ==
Serbian League Vojvodina (Tier 3)

- 2011–12

== Seasons ==
Season	League									Cup
Season	Division	Pld	W	D	L	GF	GA	Pts	Pos	Cup
Serbia and Montenegro
2003–04	3 – Vojvodina	34	16	9	9	47	36	57	4th	—
2004–05	3 – Vojvodina	34	13	7	14	45	46	46	8th	—
2005–06	3 – Vojvodina	32	12	9	11	42	36	45	9th	—
Serbia
2006–07	3 – Vojvodina	34	14	8	12	43	48	50	8th	—
2007–08	3 – Vojvodina	30	11	4	15	39	44	37	9th	—
2008–09	3 – Vojvodina	30	11	9	10	44	33	42	7th	—
2009–10	3 – Vojvodina	30	14	6	10	39	30	48	5th	—
2010–11	3 – Vojvodina	30	16	8	6	44	21	55 (Note: The club was docked one point.)	3rd	—
2011–12	3 – Vojvodina	28	17	9	2	45	20	60	1st	—
2012–13	2	34	9	8	17	35	44	35	14th	—
2013–14	3 – Vojvodina	30	10	7	13	25	36	37	10th	Preliminary round
2014–15	3 – Vojvodina	30	9	7	14	56	47	34	12th	—
2015–16	3 – Vojvodina	30	12	9	9	30	33	45	5th	—
2016–17	3 – Vojvodina	28	8	7	13	42	47	31	12th	—
2017–18	3 – Vojvodina	30	17	2	11	48	31	53	3rd	—
2018–19	3 – Vojvodina	32	9	5	18	35	60	32	17th	—
2019–20	4 – Vojvodina South	17 (Note: The season was cut short due to the COVID-19 pandemic in Serbia.)	5	5	7	21	24	20	10th	—
2020–21	4 – Vojvodina South	34	15	2	17	38	37	47	11th	—
2021–22	4 – Vojvodina South	30	10	8	12	35	35	38	9th	—
2022–23	4 – Vojvodina South	30	9	7	14	28	50	34	12th	—
2023–24	4 – Vojvodina South	30	10	6	14	37	35	36	11th	—
2024–25	4 – Vojvodina South	30	14	8	8	42	34	50	4th	—

== Notable players ==
This is a list of players who have played at full international level.

- (Serbia) Marko Gajić
- (Serbia) Milan Radin

For a list of all FK Radnički Nova Pazova players with a Wikipedia article, see Category:FK Radnički Nova Pazova players.

== Historical list of coaches ==
- (Serbia and Montenegro) Milan Đuričić (1995-1998)
- (Serbia and Montenegro) Dragojlo Stanojlović (2004)
- (Serbia) Goran Kalušević
- (Serbia) Vladimir Madžarević (2008)
- (Serbia) Nenad Vanić (2010–2013)
- (Serbia) Žarko Todorović (2013)
- (Serbia) Božidar Urošević (2013–2014)
- (Serbia) Mihajlo Bošnjak (2014)
- (Serbia) Vladimir Madžarević (2015– Apr 2016)
- (Montenegro) Marinko Mirotić (2016–2017)
- (Serbia) Darko Tešović (2017–2018)
- (Serbia) Darko Knežević (2020)
- (Serbia) Goran Bošković (2021)
- (Serbia) Stevo Dragišić (2022)
- (Serbia) Željko Nađ (2022)
- (Serbia) Vladimir Kašić (2022)
- (Serbia) Vladimir Madžarević (2023)
- (Serbia) Miroslav Gordanić (2023)
- (Serbia) Nenad Cerović (2023–2024)
- (Serbia) Božidar Đurković (2024)
- (Serbia) Stevo Dragišić (2024–)
