= FK Ušće Novi Beograd =

FK Ušće
- Full name: Fudbalski klub Ušće Novi Beograd
- Founded: 1934; 92 years ago as Vita Petrović
- Ground: Stadium FK Bežanija
- Capacity: 1,200
- President: Nenad Nikolić
- Head coach: Goran Dragoljić
- League: Serbian League Belgrade
- 2025–26: Serbian First League, 16th of 16 (relegated)
- Website: fkuscenbg.com
Home colours	Away colours

Fudbalski klub Ušće Novi Beograd (Serbian Cyrillic: Фудбалски клуб Ушће Нови Београд) is a professional football club from New Belgrade, Belgrade city, Serbia.

They currently compete in the Serbian League Belgrade, the third tier of the national league system in Serbian football.

== History ==
The club was founded in 1934. under the name Vita Petrović. The name of the club was changed several times during its history up until 2011 when it got its former name Stepojevac Vaga.

In 2021, Stepojevac Vaga was renamed Ušće.

In 2024–25, Ušće secured promotion to the Serbian First League for the first time in their history from next season after champions of Serbian League Belgrade.

However, they finished the season in the last place of the Serbian First League, so they will return to the Serbian League Belgrade in the 2026-27 season.

== Seasons ==
Season	League									Cup
Season	Division	P	W	D	L	F	A	Pts	Pos	Cup
2012–13	6 – Belgrade 2nd League (Group Sava)	24	21	0	3	84	15	63	1st	—
2013–14	5 – Belgrade 1st League (Group B)	26	23	3	0	95	23	72	1st	—
2014–15	4 – Belgrade Zone League	28	20	5	3	65	16	65	1st	—
2015–16	3 – Serbian League Belgrade	30	11	5	14	34	47	38	10th	—
2016–17	3 – Serbian League Belgrade	30	12	6	12	42	45	42	12th	—
2017–18	3 – Serbian League Belgrade	30	6	8	16	32	70	26	14th	—
2018–19	3 – Serbian League Belgrade									—
2024–25	3 – Serbian League Belgrade	26	17	9	0	48	8	60	1st	—
2025–26	2 – Serbian First League	39	6	11	22	31	60	29	16th	—

=== First-team squad ===
As of 6 April 2026

Note: Flags indicate national team as defined under FIFA eligibility rules; some limited exceptions apply. Players may hold more than one non-FIFA nationality.

No.	Pos.	Nation	Player
1	GK	SRB	Kadir Gicić (dual registration with IMT)
2	DF	SRB	Strahinja Mladenović (vice-captain)
3	MF	SRB	Đorđe Đuković
4	DF	SRB	Petar Radić
5	MF	SRB	Aleksa Cvetković (on loan from IMT)
6	DF	SRB	Uroš Vukašinović (captain)
8	MF	SRB	Andrija Savić
9	FW	SRB	Aleksa Mitić (dual registration with IMT)
10	MF	SRB	Željko Arsić
11	MF	SRB	Tomislav Todorović (on loan from IMT)
12	GK	SRB	Nikola Terzić
13	MF	RUS	Grigoriy Konyaev
14	DF	SRB	Mateja Vukomanović (on loan from IMT)
15	FW	SRB	Igor Vučićević
16	MF	POR	Breno Nolasco
17	FW	SRB	Andrej Vuletić (on loan from IMT)

No.	Pos.	Nation	Player
20	FW	SRB	Vladan Milosavljev
21	FW	NGR	Olawoyin Smith
22	MF	SRB	Luka Krstović (dual registration with IMT)
23	FW	SRB	Marko Jović
25	MF	SRB	Lazar Šutanovac
26	MF	SRB	Marko Stanojević
27	FW	SRB	Miloš Bakić (dual registration with IMT)
28	FW	AUS	Filip Adžić
29	DF	SRB	Siniša Popović (dual registration with IMT)
30	MF	SRB	Mirko Leković
31	FW	CIV	Toumani Mansa Sidibe
32	FW	NGR	Paul Owede Onowakpo
33	DF	SRB	Đorđe Đurić
34	FW	NGR	Idowu Martins
35	DF	SRB	Stefan Bastaja (dual registration with IMT)
40	GK	SRB	Nemanja Uglješić

=== Coaching staff ===
Position	Name
Manager	(Serbia) Goran Dragoljić
Assistant manager	(Serbia) Nemanja Marković (Serbia) Darko Žakula
Fitness coach	(Serbia) Nikola Marković
Goalkeeping coach	(Serbia) Nenad Šabić
Doctor	(Serbia) Dejan Fraj
Economic	(Serbia) Ratko Matijaš
Physiotherapist	(Serbia) Gordana Mitrović (Serbia) Branko Ranković (Serbia) Nemanja Vasović
General secretary	(Serbia) Ivko Petrović
Security commissioner	(Serbia) Aleksandar Cvetinović
