= Dejan Nikolić =

Serbian politician

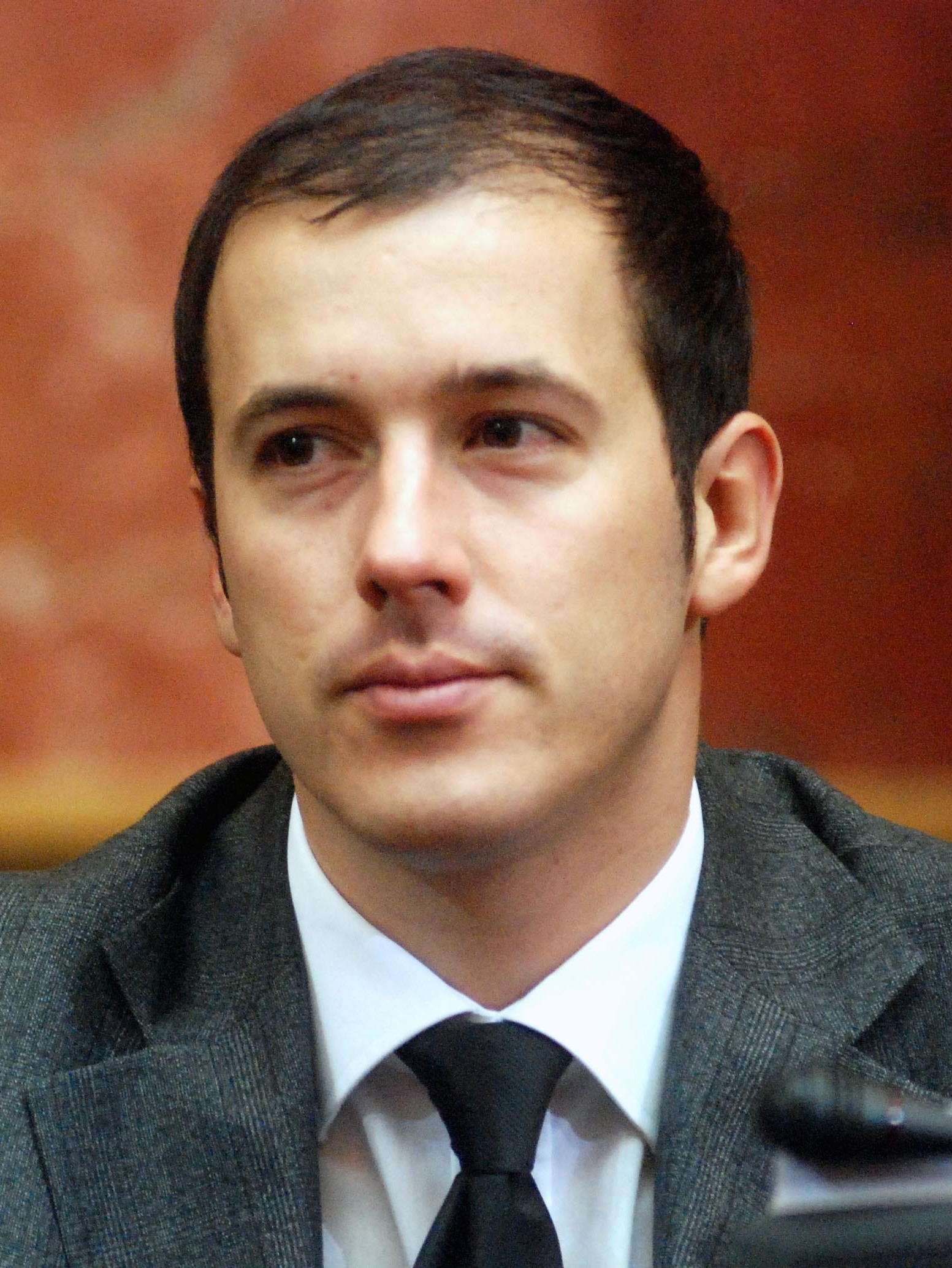

Dejan Nikolić (Serbian Cyrillic: Дејан Николић; born July 1, 1979) is a politician in Serbia. He has served in the National Assembly of Serbia since 2008 as a member of the Democratic Party.

== Early life and career ==
Nikolić was born in Sokobanja, then part of the Socialist Republic of Serbia in the Socialist Federal Republic of Yugoslavia. He graduated from the University of Niš Faculty of Sport and Physical Education and subsequently became a professor in the same department. He is the president of the Democratic Party's municipal committee in Sokobanja.

== Political career ==
Nikolić was first elected to the National Assembly in the 2008 Serbian parliamentary election. He received the 149th position on the Democratic Party's For a European Serbia electoral list and was included in the Democratic Party's assembly delegation when the list won 102 mandates. (From 2000 to 2011, parliamentary mandates were awarded to sponsoring parties or coalitions rather than to individual candidates, and it was common practice for the mandates to be distributed out of numerical order. Nikolić's relatively low position on the list, which was in any event mostly alphabetical, had no bearing on his selection to serve in the assembly.) The Democratic Party became the dominant force in a new coalition government that was formed after the election, and Nikolić served as part of its parliamentary majority. In 2009, he hosted members of the Ohio Army National Guard in a local basketball tournament in Sokobanja.

Serbia's electoral system was reformed in 2011, such that parliamentary mandates were awarded in numerical order to candidates on successful lists. Nikolić received the forty-sixth position on the Democratic Party's Choice for a Better Life list in the 2012 parliamentary election and was re-elected when the list won sixty-seven mandates. The Serbian Progressive Party and the Socialist Party of Serbia formed a new coalition government after the election, and the Democratic Party moved into opposition. In October 2012, Nikolić was elected as a vice-president of the Democratic Party.

Nikolić was promoted to the sixteenth position on the Democratic Party's list in the 2014 election and the fourteenth position in the 2016 election and was re-elected on both occasions, when the party respectively won nineteen and sixteen mandates. The Democratic Party has remained in opposition during this time. Nikolić is the deputy chair of the assembly's environmental protection committee; a member of the committee on the economy, regional development, trade, tourism, and energy; a deputy member of the health and family committee; and a member of the parliamentary friendship groups with Azerbaijan, France, Germany, Italy, Saudi Arabia, the United Kingdom, and the United States of America. He is also a member of an informal environmentalist "green group" in the assembly.
