= FK Proleter 023 =

Serbian football club

Proleter 023
- Full name: Fudbalski klub Proleter 023
- Founded: 1921; 105 years ago, as Bratstvo; 9 July 2026; 2 months ago as Proleter 023
- Ground: Zrenjanin City Stadium
- Capacity: 13,500
- President: Milan Poučki
- Head coach: Nikola Stojanović
- League: Serbian First League
- 2025–26: Serbian League Vojvodina, 1st of 16 (promoted)
- Website: fknaftagas.com
Home colours	Away colours

Fudbalski klub Proleter 023 (Serbian Cyrillic: Фудбалски клуб Пролетер 023) is a football club based in Zrenjanin, Serbia. The team currently competes in the Serbian First League.

Founded in 1921, the club was known as Bratstvo after World War II, before changing its name to Naftagas in the early 1970s. After winning the 2025–26 Serbian League Vojvodina, the club relocated from Elemir to Zrenjanin and changed its name to Proleter 023.

The club also has youth categories that participate in the development of young players, including youth, cadet and pioneer selection.

== History ==
The club was founded in 1921 in Elemir. Throughout its history, it has competed in various levels of football competitions in Vojvodina and Serbia. In more recent history, the club has achieved notable results in Vojvodina competitions and managed to advance to the Serbian League Vojvodina, where it competed with clubs from the wider province.

The club's greatest success in recent history was achieved in the 2025–26 season, when it won first place in the Serbian League Vojvodina and earned promotion to the Serbian First League. Naftagas secured the title with three rounds remaining, making it a historic success for the club.

The club won the Vojvodina Cup in the 2024–25 season, after a convincing 4–0 victory over Dinamo 1945 in the final and thus qualified for the 2025–26 Serbian Cup. They defeated Smederevo 1924 2–1 in the preliminary round, before losing 1–0 to Novi Pazar in the round of 32.

On 9 July 2026, the club moved to Zrenjanin and officially changed its name to Proleter 023.

== Stadium ==
Naftagas plays its home games at the stadium in Elemir. The main pitch measures 100 × 75 meters, and the club also has an auxiliary pitch for training and work of the younger categories. The stands have a capacity of about 400 seats.

From the 2026/27 season, the club will play its home games at Stadion Karađorđev park in Zrenjanin.

== Players ==
=== First-team squad ===
As of 25 August 2026

Note: Flags indicate national team as defined under FIFA eligibility rules; some limited exceptions apply. Players may hold more than one non-FIFA nationality.

No.	Pos.	Nation	Player
1	GK	SRB	Nikola Perić
2	DF	GHA	Kwadwo Opoku Ackah
3	DF	SRB	Đorđe Bajić
4	DF	SRB	Božidar Blagojević
5	MF	SRB	Miloš Ožegović
6	DF	JAM	Lamonth Rochester
7	FW	SRB	Marko Kovačević
8	MF	SRB	Uroš Vukićević
9	FW	SRB	Vladimir Silađi
10	FW	SRB	Stefan Trajković
11	FW	SRB	Miloš Savanović (captain)
14	DF	SRB	Luka Nikolić
15	DF	SRB	Siniša Popović (on loan from IMT)
17	MF	MNE	Matija Marsenić
18	FW	SRB	Stefan Vidaković (on loan from Radnik Surdulica)

No.	Pos.	Nation	Player
19	DF	SRB	Mihajlo Goronjić
21	FW	SRB	Dušan Dodić
23	DF	SRB	Vukašin Radosavljević (on loan from IMT)
24	MF	SRB	Mlađan Stevanović
25	GK	SRB	Nikola Galin
27	FW	SRB	Stefan Ilić
29	FW	SRB	Marko Arsović
45	MF	SRB	Stefan Gajilović
49	FW	SRB	Mirko Nikolašević
71	MF	RUS	Dmitriy Paderin
77	FW	SRB	Lazar Vučurović
80	MF	SRB	Strahinja Perin
88	MF	SRB	Nikola Pantić
—	GK	RUS	Ilya Guchmazov

=== Out on loan ===
Note: Flags indicate national team as defined under FIFA eligibility rules; some limited exceptions apply. Players may hold more than one non-FIFA nationality.

No.	Pos.	Nation	Player
—	GK	SRB	Stefan Todić (at OFK Gradnulica until the end of the season)

=== Coaching staff ===
Position	Name
Head coach	(North Macedonia) Nikola Stojanović
Assistant coach	(Serbia) Milenko Milaković (Serbia) Ljubomir Stevanović
Goalkeeping coach	(Serbia) Martin Magda
Fitness coach	(Serbia) Jovan Marković
Doctor	(Serbia) Aleksandar Vidrić
Secretary of the coaching staff	(Serbia) Dejan Đorđević
Security commissioner	(Serbia) Drago Galin

== Honours ==
- Serbian League Vojvodina (Tier 3)
  - 2025–26
- Vojvodina League East (Tier 4)
  - 2021–22

== Recent league history ==
Season	Division	P	W	D	L	F	A	Pts	Pos	Cup
2020–21	4 - Vojvodina League East	32	18	8	6	95	42	62	3th	Did not qualify
2021–22	4 - Vojvodina League East	30	21	3	6	76	40	66	1st	Did not qualify
2022–23	3 - Serbian League Vojvodina	28	17	3	8	47	39	54	3th	Did not qualify
2023–24	3 - Serbian League Vojvodina	30	13	6	11	46	40	45	6th	Did not qualify
2024–25	3 - Serbian League Vojvodina	30	14	5	11	44	31	47	7th	Did not qualify
2025–26	3 - Serbian League Vojvodina	30	22	3	5	56	20	69	1st	Round of 32
