= FK Mladost Novi Sad =

Serbian football club

Mladost Novi Sad
- Full name: Fudbalski Klub Mladost GAT
- Founded: 1972; 54 years ago
- Ground: GAT Arena, Novi Sad
- Capacity: 1,400
- 2024–25: Serbian First League, 3rd of 16 (withdrew)
Home colours	Away colours

FK Mladost Novi Sad (Serbian Cyrillic: ФК Младост Нови Сад) is a professional football club based in Novi Sad, Vojvodina, Serbia.

Almost unknown before 2021, FK Mladost (then Mladost GAT) surprised the nation after winning promotion to the SuperLiga in the 2021/2022 season, becoming the second club representing Novi Sad in the top flight after two-times champion Vojvodina. Despite sizeable investments, the club was relegated in their first SuperLiga season.

== History ==
Between 2018–19 and 2021–22, the club achieved four consecutive promotions to reach the Serbian SuperLiga. They finished bottom of the table in their debut season in the top flight and were relegated back to the Serbian First League.

The club was managed by construction company GAT doo, which is owned by Dejan Slijepčević. Slijepčević's strong connection to the Serbian Progressive Party has led to a controversy.

In summer 2025, the club withdrew from all competitions.

== Honours ==
- Serbian First League (Tier 2)
  - Champions (1): 2021–22
- Serbian League Vojvodina (Tier 3)
  - Champions (1): 2020–21
- Vojvodina League South (Tier 4)
  - Champions (1): 2019–20

== Seasons ==
Season	League									Cup
Season	Division	Pld	W	D	L	GF	GA	Pts	Pos	Cup
Serbia
2018–19	5 – Novi Sad	28	20	7	1	78	27	67	1st	—
2019–20	4 – Vojvodina South	17 (Note: The season was cut short due to the COVID-19 pandemic in Serbia.)	12	3	2	43	12	39	1st	—
2020–21	3 – Vojvodina	38	30	4	4	97	28	94	1st	—
2021–22	2	37	21	9	7	48	24	72	1st	—
2022–23	1	37	6	12	19	25	49	30	16th	Round of 16
2023–24	2	37	11	11	13	35	38	46	11th	Round of 16
2024–25	2	37	17	14	6	43	31	65	3rd	Round of 16

== Notable players ==
This is a list of players who have played at full international level.

- (Montenegro) Andrija Radulović
- (Togo) Emmanuel Hackman
- (United States) Romain Gall

For a list of all FK Mladost Novi Sad players with a Wikipedia article, see Category:FK Mladost Novi Sad players.

== Historical list of coaches ==
- (Serbia) Nemanja Džodžo (2016–2019)
- (Serbia) Saša Filipović (2019–2021)
- (Serbia) Ljubomir Ristovski (2021–2022)
- (Serbia) Branko Žigić (2022)
- (Serbia) Aleksandar Linta (2022)
- (Serbia) Ljubomir Ristovski (2022–2023)
- (Serbia) Nenad Lalatović (2023)
- (Serbia) Nemanja Krtolica (2023)
- (Serbia) Branko Žigić (2023)
- (Serbia) Dušan Bajić (2023–2024)
- (Serbia) Dragan Perišić (Apr 2024- Jun 24)
- (Serbia) Nenad Mijailović (Jun 2024-Jan 25)
- (Serbia) Ivica Milutinović (Jan 2025-Jun 25)
