= 2010–11 Serbian First League =

Serbian First League
- Season: 2010–11
- Champions: BASK
- Promoted: Radnički 1923; Novi Pazar
- Relegated: Zemun; Big Bull Radnički; Dinamo Vranje; BASK
- Matches: 306
- Goals: 665 (2.17 per match)
- Top goalscorer: Slobodan Dinčić (21 goals)
- Biggest home win: Novi Sad 6–0 Dinamo Vranje
- Highest scoring: Sinđelić Niš 5–2 Kolubara

The 2010–11 Serbian First League was the sixth season of the league under its current name. It started on 14 August 2010 and concluded on 15 June 2011.

BASK won the title and Radnički 1923 finished as runners-up, with both clubs earning promotion to the top flight. BASK later ceded its 2011–12 Serbian SuperLiga spot to third-placed Novi Pazar for financial reasons and was administratively relegated to the Serbian League Belgrade. This decision allowed Kolubara to avoid relegation.

Zemun, Big Bull Radnički and Dinamo Vranje were relegated to their respective Serbian League groups.

== League table ==
Pos	Team	Pld	W	D	L	GF	GA	GD	Pts	Promotion or relegation
1	BASK (R, C)	34	24	5	5	54	21	+33	77	Relegation to Serbian League (Note: Although BASK has won promotion to 2011–12 Serbian SuperLiga, they declined it, stating financial difficulties. The club was penalized by Football Association, thus instead of promotion, they ended being demoted by two divisions. As BASK first won promotion and then declined it, they will play in the 3rd tier, Serbian League, group Belgrade, in the 2011-12 season. That automatically meant that 4th-from-bottom team has been spared of relegation.)
2	Radnički 1923 (P)	34	22	8	4	61	22	+39	74	Promotion to Serbian SuperLiga
3	Novi Pazar (P)	34	21	8	5	46	20	+26	71	Promotion to Serbian SuperLiga
4	Banat Zrenjanin	34	15	11	8	41	31	+10	56	
5	Sinđelić Niš	34	15	8	11	41	34	+7	53	
6	Napredak	34	13	10	11	35	32	+3	49	
7	Radnički Sombor	34	13	10	11	30	29	+1	49	
8	Proleter Novi Sad	34	12	9	13	46	40	+6	45	
9	Mladost Lučani	34	11	12	11	29	32	−3	45	
10	Mladi Radnik	34	12	7	15	38	49	−11	43	
11	Novi Sad	34	11	9	14	37	42	−5	42	
12	Bežanija	34	11	7	16	26	28	−2	40	
13	Teleoptik	34	9	12	13	35	44	−9	39	
14	Srem	34	8	12	14	30	43	−13	36	
15	Kolubara (Note: Deducted three points for walking off the pitch in 85th minute of game against FK Teleoptik, in the last round of last year's championship.)	34	9	9	16	33	43	−10	33 (Note: Kolubara had better head-to-head statistics against Zemun.)	
16	Zemun (R)	34	8	9	17	34	40	−6	33	Relegation to Serbian League
17	Big Bull Radnički (R)	34	7	5	22	26	50	−24	26	Relegation to Serbian League
18	Dinamo Vranje (R)	34	7	5	22	23	65	−42	26	Relegation to Serbian League

Source: srbijasport.net
(C) Champions; (P) Promoted; (R) Relegated

== Results ==
Home \ Away	BAN	BASK	BBR	BEŽ	DVR	KOL	MLR	MLA	NAP	NPZ	NSD	PNS	RDK	RSO	SNI	SRM	TLO	ZEM
Banat		1–1	1–0	1–0	1–1	1–0	5–1	3–0	0–0	2–1	1–1	2–1	2–1	0–1	2–2	1–2	2–0	1–0
BASK	1–0		3–1	0–0	5–0	3–2	1–0	2–0	3–1	1–0	3–0	2–1	0–0	2–1	4–0	2–1	3–0	2–1
Big Bull Radnički	0–0	0–1		0–3	2–0	2–2	1–2	0–3	1–2	0–2	0–1	1–2	0–2	2–0	2–0	1–2	0–0	2–0
Bežanija	0–1	1–0	1–1		4–1	2–0	1–0	0–0	1–1	1–0	2–1	1–2	0–1	0–0	2–0	3–0	0–1	1–0
Dinamo Vranje	0–1	0–1	0–0	1–0		0–2	1–0	0–1	0–2	0–0	2–1	4–1	0–0	1–0	0–1	1–1	1–0	0–2
Kolubara	1–1	0–1	2–0	3–1	2–1		1–1	1–0	0–2	0–1	1–3	0–0	1–1	2–1	0–2	1–1	4–0	0–0
Mladi Radnik	4–2	1–3	1–0	2–0	3–2	1–0		3–1	1–0	0–4	2–1	3–1	1–2	1–1	0–2	0–0	3–3	1–0
Mladost Lučani	0–1	0–0	1–0	2–0	4–1	2–0	0–0		0–0	0–0	1–0	0–0	1–0	2–3	1–1	2–0	1–0	0–0
Napredak	3–0	0–1	2–0	1–0	2–0	0–1	1–0	1–3		0–0	1–2	2–1	0–2	1–1	1–1	1–0	0–0	3–1
Novi Pazar	1–0	2–0	4–1	1–0	2–1	2–0	1–0	2–1	2–1		2–0	1–1	0–0	1–0	1–1	1–1	3–1	2–1
Novi Sad	1–1	0–1	0–5	1–0	6–0	1–0	3–0	3–0	2–0	0–3		1–1	0–1	1–1	0–3	3–2	0–0	2–1
Proleter Novi Sad	0–0	3–1	2–0	1–0	3–1	2–0	2–0	1–1	2–0	3–0	1–1		2–2	1–2	2–3	4–1	1–2	1–2
Radnički 1923	2–0	3–0	4–0	3–1	6–0	2–1	1–1	2–0	4–2	2–0	1–0	2–0		2–1	1–0	2–1	3–1	3–1
Radnički Sombor	1–0	0–1	2–1	0–1	2–0	1–0	2–1	0–0	1–1	0–1	0–0	1–1	2–1		1–0	1–0	2–1	1–2
Sinđelić Niš	1–2	1–0	0–1	2–0	2–3	5–2	1–1	1–0	1–1	1–3	3–0	1–0	1–0	2–0		2–0	0–0	1–0
Srem	1–1	1–4	2–0	0–0	2–0	1–1	2–0	1–1	0–1	0–1	1–1	0–3	0–2	0–0	2–0		0–0	1–0
Teleoptik	2–2	0–2	0–2	0–0	4–1	1–1	3–0	1–1	1–1	0–1	2–1	1–0	1–1	0–1	2–0	2–3		4–3
Zemun	1–3	0–0	3–0	1–0	1–0	1–2	1–3	5–0	0–1	1–1	0–0	2–0	2–2	0–0	0–0	1–1	1–2	

Source: srbijasport.net
Legend: Blue = home team win; Yellow = draw; Red = away team win.

== Top scorers ==
Pos	Scorer	Team	Goals
1	(Serbia) Slobodan Dinčić	BASK	21
2	(Serbia) Darko Spalević	Radnički 1923	19
3	(Montenegro) Miloš Đalac	Novi Pazar	14
4	(Serbia) Ognjen Damnjanović	Proleter Novi Sad	13
4	(Serbia) Rodoljub Paunović	BASK	13
6	(Serbia) Saša Bogunović	Novi Sad	12
6	(Serbia) Zoran Stojanović	Kolubara	12
6	(Serbia) Nikola Vujošević	Zemun	12
9	(Serbia) Milan Vukašinović	Mladi Radnik	11
