= Serbian First League =

- Founded: 2005; 21 years ago
- Country: Serbia
- Confederation: UEFA
- Number of clubs: 16
- Level on pyramid: 2
- Promotion to: Serbian SuperLiga
- Relegation to: Serbian League
- Domestic cup: Serbian Cup
- Current champions: Zemun (2nd title) (2025–26)
- Most championships: Mladost Lučani, Napredak Kruševac, Radnik Surdulica (2 titles)
- Website: prvaliga.rs
- Current: 2026–27 Serbian First League

The Serbian First League (Serbian: Прва лига Србије / Prva liga Srbije), referred to as the Mozzart Bet First League for sponsorship reasons, is the second tier in professional Serbia's football league. The league was formed in 2005, following a reshuffle of the second tier Serbo-Montenegrin divisions. It is operated by the Football Association of Serbia.

== Format ==
The league is usually formed by 16 clubs which play all against one another twice, once at home, once away. Due to the COVID-19 pandemic in 2020, the Football Association of Serbia completed a restructure of the league system, and in season 2020/2021 that meant 18 clubs would be competing in the Serbian First League, the number of clubs will go back to the usual 16 following the conclusion of the 2020-2021 season. The top two clubs are directly promoted to the Serbian SuperLiga, Third team going into the playoff, and playing against 14 teams from the Super League, while the bottom are relegated to the Serbian League. The Football Association of Serbia announced that in the 2015–16 Serbian First League 4 clubs will be relegated.

First League will two teams promoted directly, while four teams relegated from SuperLiga due to reduce teams from 16 to 14 from 2026–27 and 12 from 2027–28. Six teams relegated to Serbian League for 2025–26 and 2026–27.

== History ==
The Serbian First League is the successor of the Yugoslav Second League. With the break-up of SFR Yugoslavia in 1992, the clubs from the newly independent states of Bosnia and Herzegovina, Croatia, Macedonia and Slovenia joined to their own newly formed leagues, while Serbia and Montenegro remained united and renamed into FR Yugoslavia with the clubs from both republics kept competing in the league. In 2003, the Federal Republic of Yugoslavia was renamed to Serbia and Montenegro and the football league followed suit. Finally, after Montenegrin independence in 2006, the Montenegrin clubs withdrew and formed their own league.

=== Serbia and Montenegro second tier ===
In 2005, a reshuffle of the second tier of the Serbo-Montenegrin football league system saw two parallel leagues set up, for each republic.

Season	Champions	Runners-up	Third place
2005–06	Bežanija	Mladost Apatin	Čukarički

=== Serbian First League ===
After Montenegro's independence, the Serbian First League kept the name and single league format readopted in 2005.

Season	Champions	Runners up	Third place	Top scorer(s)	Goals
2006–07	Mladost Lučani	Čukarički	Napredak Kruševac	(Serbia) Filip Đorđević (Rad)	16
2007–08	Javor Ivanjica	Jagodina	BSK Borča	(Serbia) Igor Pavlović (Jagodina)	17
2008–09	BSK Borča	Smederevo	Mladi Radnik	(Serbia) Marko Pavićević (Sevojno)	15
2009–10	Inđija	Sevojno	Kolubara	(Serbia) Borivoje Filipović (Inđija)	12
2010–11	BASK	Radnički Kragujevac	Novi Pazar	(Serbia) Darko Spalević (Radnički Kragujevac)	13
2011–12	Radnički Niš	Donji Srem	Mladost Lučani	(Serbia) Ivan Pejčić (Radnički Niš)	13
2012–13	Napredak Kruševac	Čukarički	Voždovac	(Serbia) Milanko Rašković (Borac Čačak)	19
2013–14	Mladost Lučani (2)	Borac Čačak	Metalac Gornji Milanovac	(Serbia) Predrag Živadinović (Mladost Lučani)	15
2014–15	Radnik Surdulica	Javor Ivanjica	Metalac Gornji Milanovac	(Serbia) Stefan Dražić (Javor)	13
2015–16	Napredak Kruševac (2)	OFK Bačka	ČSK Čelarevo	(Serbia) Nenad Lukić (Bežanija)	14
2016–17	Mačva Šabac	Zemun	Sloboda Užice	(Bosnia and Herzegovina) Uroš Đerić (Sloboda Užice)	19
2017–18	Proleter Novi Sad	Dinamo Vranje	Metalac Gornji Milanovac	(Ghana) Zakaria Suraka (Dinamo Vranje)	17
2018–19	TSC	Javor Ivanjica	Inđija	(Serbia) Ivan Marković (Javor Ivanjica)	29
2019–20	Zlatibor	Grafičar	OFK Bačka	(Serbia) Aleksandar Katanić (Metalac Gornji Milanovac)	19
2020–21	Radnički Kragujevac	Kolubara	Kabel	(Bosnia and Herzegovina) Dragiša Komarčević (Loznica)	14
2021–22	Mladost Novi Sad	Javor Ivanjica	Železničar Pančevo	(Serbia) Milan Vidakov (Mladost Novi Sad)	18
2022–23	IMT	Železničar Pančevo	Grafičar	(Serbia) Krsta Đorđević (Radnički SM) (Serbia) Miloš Luković (IMT)	15
2023–24	OFK Beograd	Jedinstvo	Inđija	(Serbia) Dejan Georgijević (OFK Beograd)	17
2024–25	Radnik Surdulica (2)	Javor Ivanjica	Mladost Novi Sad	(Serbia) Luka Ratković (Dubočica)	18
2025–26	Zemun	Mačva Šabac	Voždovac	(Serbia) Vuk Boškan (Kabel)	18

== 2026–27 teams ==
Locations of the 2026–27 Serbian First League teams
1 Bor 1919
2 Borac 1926
3 GFK Dubočica 1923
4 Javor-Matis
5 Jedinstvo
6 Loznica
7 Metalac
8 Napredak
9 OFK Vršac
10 Proleter 023
11 RFK Grafičar
12 Smederevo 1924
13 Spartak ŽK
14 Teleoptik
15 TSC
16 Voždovac

The following 16 clubs compete in the 2026–27 Serbian First League.

Team	City	Stadium	Capacity
Bor 1919	Bor	Mladost Stadium (temporarily)	10,331
Borac 1926	Čačak	Čačak Stadium	6,500
GFK Dubočica 1923	Leskovac	Dubočica Stadium	8,136
Javor-Matis	Ivanjica	Stadion kraj Moravice	5,000
Jedinstvo	Ub	Stadium Dragan Džajić	4,000
Loznica	Loznica	Lagator Stadium	8,030
Metalac	Gornji Milanovac	Stadion Metalac	4,500
Napredak	Kruševac	Mladost Stadium	10,331
OFK Vršac	Vršac	City Stadium Vršac	5,000
Proleter 023	Zrenjanin	Zrenjanin City Stadium	13,500
RFK Grafičar	Belgrade	South artificial grass No. 5 field of – Rajko Mitić Stadium	1,000
Smederevo 1924	Smederevo	Smederevo Stadium	17,200
Spartak ŽK	Subotica	Subotica City Stadium	13,000
Teleoptik	Belgrade	Partizan Stadium (temporarily)	29,775
TSC	Bačka Topola	TSC Arena	4,500
Voždovac	Belgrade	Voždovac Stadium	5,200

== Previous seasons ==
=== Relegated teams (from First League to Serbian League) ===
Season	Clubs
2006–07	Inđija, Dinamo Vranje, Mačva Šabac, BASK, Spartak Subotica, Obilić
2007–08	Radnički Niš, Zemun, Vlasina, Mladenovac, Radnički Pirot
2008–09	Voždovac, Hajduk Beograd
2009–10	Radnički Niš, Sloga Kraljevo, ČSK, Mladost Apatin
2010–11	Zemun, Big Bull Radnički, Dinamo Vranje
2011–12	Radnički Sombor, Mladi Radnik, Sinđelić Niš, Srem S. Mitrovica
2012–13	Novi Sad, Kolubara, Mladenovac, Radnički Nova Pazova, Banat
2013–14	Timok, Dolina, Teleoptik, Smederevo
2014–15	Moravac, Jedinstvo Užice, Sloga Kraljevo, Mačva Šabac
2015–16	Sloga Petrovac, Donji Srem, Loznica, Radnički Kragujevac
2016–17	Kolubara, BSK Borča, OFK Odžaci, OFK Beograd
2017–18	Radnički Pirot, Temnić 1924, ČSK, Jagodina
2018–19	Bežanija, Borac Čačak, Bečej 1918, Teleoptik, Sloboda Užice
2019–20	Smederevo 1924, Sinđelić Beograd
2020–21	Borac 1926, Dinamo Vranje, Dubočica, Trayal, Radnički Pirot, Jagodina, Sloga, Zemun
2021–22	Kabel, Timok 1919, OFK Bačka, Budućnost Dobanovci, Žarkovo
2022–23	Loznica, Trayal, Zlatibor, Rad
2023–24	Kolubara, Metalac, Novi Sad 1921, Radnički Beograd
2024–25	Mladost GAT, Radnički SM, Sloven, Inđija, Sloboda Užice
2025–26	Tekstilac, Kabel, FAP, SU Dinamo Jug, Trayal, Ušće Novi Beograd

=== Relegated teams (from SuperLiga to First League) ===
Season	Clubs
2006–07	Zemun, Voždovac
2007–08	Bežanija, Mladost Lučani, Smederevo
2008–09	Banat Zrenjanin
2009–10	Mladi Radnik, Napredak Kruševac
2010–11	Čukarički, Inđija
2011–12	Metalac, Borac Čačak
2012–13	Smederevo, BSK Borča
2013–14	Javor, Sloboda Užice
2014–15	Radnički Kragujevac, Donji Srem, Napredak Kruševac
2015–16	Jagodina, OFK Beograd
2016–17	Metalac, Novi Pazar
2017–18	Javor, Borac Čačak
2018–19	Dinamo Vranje, Zemun, Bačka
2019–20	None
2020–21	Javor, Rad, Bačka, Inđija, Mačva, Zlatibor
2021–22	Proleter, Metalac
2022–23	Mladost GAT, Kolubara
2023–24	Javor, Voždovac, Radnik Surdulica
2024–25	Tekstilac Odžaci, Jedinstvo Ub
2025–26	TSC, Javor-Matis, Spartak ŽK, Napredak

=== Promoted teams (from Serbian League to First League) ===
Season	Clubs			
Season	Serbian League Belgrade	Serbian League East	Serbian League Vojvodina	Serbian League West
2006–07	Hajduk Beograd	Jagodina	Novi Sad	Metalac Gornji Milanovac
2007–08	Kolubara	Dinamo Vranje	Spartak Subotica; Inđija	Mladi Radnik
2008–09	Zemun; Teleoptik	Radnički Niš	Proleter Novi Sad; Radnički Sombor	Sloga Kraljevo
2009–10	BASK	Sinđelić Niš	Big Bull Radnički	Radnički 1923
2010–11	Mladenovac	Radnički Niš	Donji Srem	Sloga Kraljevo
2011–12	Voždovac	Timok	Radnički Nova Pazova	Jedinstvo Putevi
2012–13	Sinđelić Beograd	Radnik Surdulica	Dolina Padina	Sloga Petrovac
2013–14	Kolubara	Moravac	Bačka	Mačva
2014–15	Zemun	Dinamo Vranje	ČSK	Loznica
2015–16	Budućnost Dobanovci	Radnički Pirot	OFK Odžaci	Mačva Šabac
2016–17	Teleoptik	Temnić 1924	TSC	Radnički 1923
2017–18	Žarkovo	Trayal	Bečej	Zlatibor
2018–19	Grafičar	Radnički Pirot	Kabel	Smederevo 1924
2019–20	IMT	Jagodina; Dubočica	Železničar Pančevo; Radnički Sremska Mitrovica	Borac 1926; Loznica; Sloga Kraljevo
2020–21	Teleoptik	Timok	Mladost Novi Sad	Sloga Požega
2021–22	Radnički Beograd	Trayal	OFK Vršac	Sloboda Užice; Jedinstvo Ub
2022–23	OFK Beograd	Dubočica	Tekstilac	Smederevo 1924
2023–24	Zemun	Trayal	Sloven Ruma	Borac 1926
2024–25	Ušće	SU Dinamo Jug	Kabel	FAP; Loznica
2025–26	Teleoptik	Bor 1919	Proleter 023	Metalac

=== All-time table 2005–2026 ===
The following is a list of clubs who have played in the Serbian First League at any time since its formation in 2005 to the current season. Teams playing in the 2026–27 Serbian First League season are indicated in bold. A total of 80 teams have played in the Serbian First League.

Pos.	Team	S	P	W	D	L	F	A	Pts	1º	2º	3º	1st App	Since/Last App	Highest finish
1	Inđija	**15**	**509**	**205**	**137**	**167**	**618**	**522**	**752**	1	–	2	2006–07	2024–25	**1st**
2	Bežanija	12	395	151	125	119	451	352	578	1	–	–	2005–06	2018–19	**1st**
3	**Metalac**	10	333	147	86	100	405	301	527	–	–	**3**	2007–08	2026–27	3rd
4	Kolubara	11	361	122	109	130	389	409	475	–	1	1	2008–09	2023–24	2nd
5	Mačva Šabac	9	319	119	97	103	346	341	454	1	1	–	2005–06	2025–26	**1st**
6	Proleter Novi Sad	9	286	114	75	97	377	314	417	1	–	–	2009–10	2017–18	**1st**
7	Novi Pazar	9	309	109	77	123	307	375	404	–	–	1	2005–06	2019–20	3rd
8	**Javor**	6	213	111	67	35	299	165	400	1	**4**	–	2006–07	2026–27	**1st**
9	Zemun	9	298	102	92	104	324	324	398	1	1	–	2007–08	2025–26	**1st**
10	**Napredak Kruševac**	6	208	108	47	53	297	193	371	**2**	–	1	2005–06	2026–27	**1st**
11	**Grafičar**	7	251	100	69	82	363	296	369	–	1	1	2019–20	2019–20	2nd
12	Dinamo Vranje	9	294	100	68	126	304	375	368	–	1	–	2006–07	2020–21	2nd
13	Mladost Lučani	7	238	95	78	65	251	207	363	**2**	–	1	2006–07	2013–14	**1st**
14	ČSK Čelarevo	8	268	92	87	89	283	271	363	–	–	1	2005–06	2017–18	3rd
15	Novi Sad	9	316	95	76	145	309	422	361	–	–	–	2005–06	2023–24	5th
16	BSK Borča	7	226	95	59	72	265	222	344	1	–	1	2006–07	2016–17	**1st**
17	Radnički 1923	7	233	91	58	84	277	271	331	1	1	–	2005–06	2020–21	**1st**
18	Sloboda Užice	8	268	75	88	105	246	317	313	–	–	1	2014–15	2024–25	3rd
19	Srem	7	246	79	64	103	253	311	301	–	–	–	2005–06	2011–12	5th
20	**Borac Čačak**	6	211	79	52	80	236	219	289	–	1	–	2012–13	2024–25	2nd
21	**Smederevo 1924**	6	207	77	54	76	224	226	285	–	1	–	2008–09	2023–24	2nd
22	**Teleoptik**	7	233	68	72	93	248	274	276	–	–	–	2009–10	2026–27	6th
23	**Voždovac**	5	174	73	53	48	218	150	272	–	–	2	2007–08	2024–25	3rd
24	Sinđelić Beograd	7	217	71	59	87	229	261	272	–	–	–	2013–14	2019–20	6th
25	Radnički Pirot	7	234	73	51	110	242	292	270	–	–	–	2005–06	2020–21	6th
26	Sevojno	5	178	71	52	55	218	179	265	–	1	–	2005–06	2009–10	2nd
27	Radnički Niš	5	178	68	53	57	196	169	257	1	–	–	2005–06	2011–12	**1st**
28	Čukarički	4	144	71	40	33	188	107	253	–	2	1	2005–06	2012–13	2nd
29	Budućnost Dobanovci	6	198	62	54	82	200	244	240	–	–	–	2016–17	2021–22	8th
30	Radnički Sremska Mitrovica	5	182	61	55	66	183	180	238	–	–	–	2020–21	2024–25	5th
31	Trayal	6	214	63	52	99	212	260	238	–	–	–	2018–19	2025–26	9th
32	**Loznica**	5	173	61	49	63	186	195	236	–	–	–	2015–16	2025–26	4th
33	Sloga Kraljevo	6	196	58	52	86	174	244	226	–	–	–	2009–10	2020–21	7th
34	Mladenovac	5	178	53	48	77	186	234	207	–	–	–	2005–06	2012–13	10th
35	**Jedinstvo Ub**	4	147	56	36	55	179	183	204	–	1	–	2005–06	2025–26	2nd
36	IMT	3	108	59	25	25	189	108	202	1	–	–	2020–21	2020–21	**1st**
37	Rad	4	146	52	41	53	180	172	197	–	–	–	2006–07	2022–23	4th
38	Bačka	4	127	54	34	39	159	129	196	–	1	1	2014–15	2021–22	2nd
39	Mladost Apatin	4	140	54	34	52	139	140	196	–	1	–	2005–06	2009–10	2nd
40	**OFK Vršac**	4	146	50	46	50	141	148	196	–	–	–	2022–23	2022–23	5th
41	Žarkovo	4	138	54	31	53	152	155	193	–	–	–	2018–19	2021–22	6th
42	Zlatibor	4	141	51	38	52	155	158	191	1	–	–	2018–19	2022–23	**1st**
43	Mladost Novi Sad	3	111	49	36	26	126	93	183	1	–	–	2021–22	2023–24	**1st**
44	Radnik Surdulica	3	97	52	24	21	136	69	180	**2**	–	–	2013–14	2024–25	**1st**
45	Železničar Pančevo	3	108	53	21	34	155	114	180	–	1	1	2020–21	2020–21	2nd
46	Banat	4	136	44	45	47	136	147	177	–	–	–	2009–10	2012–13	4th
47	Kabel	4	140	44	41	55	125	183	173	–	–	1	2019–20	2025–26	3rd
48	**Dubočica**	4	147	39	50	58	145	198	167	–	–	–	2020–21	2023–24	10th
49	BASK	3	110	46	24	40	133	121	162	1	–	–	2005–06	2010–11	**1st**
50	Jagodina	4	128	37	39	52	122	161	150	–	1	–	2007–08	2020–21	2nd
51	**TSC**	2	67	41	18	8	129	49	141	1	–	–	2017–18	2026–27	**1st**
52	Mladi Radnik	3	102	39	24	39	104	111	141	–	–	1	2008–09	2011–12	3rd
53	**Spartak Subotica**	3	110	36	29	45	126	132	137	–	–	–	2005–06	2026–27	4th
54	Vlasina	3	110	33	38	39	110	131	137	–	–	–	2005–06	2007–08	9th
55	Radnički Sombor	3	102	36	27	39	85	95	135	–	–	–	2009–10	2011–12	7th
56	Jedinstvo Putevi	3	94	33	27	34	93	105	126	–	–	–	2012–13	2014–15	6th
57	Sloga Petrovac	3	90	32	26	32	106	113	122	–	–	–	2013–14	2015–16	6th
58	Timok	3	101	30	27	44	101	127	117	–	–	–	2012–13	2021–22	11th
59	Tekstilac	2	76	27	25	24	91	79	106	–	–	–	2023–24	2025–26	4th
60	Donji Srem	2	64	24	23	17	58	53	95	–	1	–	2011–12	2015–16	2nd
61	OFK Beograd	2	67	25	16	26	88	85	91	1	–	–	2016–17	2023–24	**1st**
62	Sinđelić Niš	2	68	22	18	28	75	84	84	–	–	–	2010–11	2011–12	5th
63	Radnički Beograd	2	74	19	14	41	64	118	65	–	–	–	2022–23	2023–24	8th
64	Dinamo Jug	1	39	16	14	9	44	33	58	–	–	–	2025–26	2025–26	8th
65	Hajduk Beograd	2	68	14	12	42	48	113	54	–	–	–	2007–08	2008–09	13th
66	Bečej	1	37	12	8	17	39	44	44	–	–	–	2018–19	2018–19	13th
67	PSK	1	38	11	7	20	47	58	40	–	–	–	2005–06	2005–06	16th
68	FAP	1	39	10	10	19	41	58	40	–	–	–	2025–26	2025–26	13th
69	Sloven	1	37	8	15	14	31	44	39	–	–	–	2024–25	2024–25	14th
70	Radnički Nova Pazova	1	34	9	8	17	35	44	35	–	–	–	2012–13	2012–13	14th
71	Moravac	1	30	10	5	15	32	41	35	–	–	–	2014–15	2014–15	13th
72	Dolina	1	30	9	7	14	31	42	34	–	–	–	2013–14	2013–14	14th
73	Ušće	1	39	6	11	22	31	60	29	–	–	–	2025–26	2025–26	16th
74	OFK Niš	1	38	7	6	25	26	64	27	–	–	–	2005–06	2005–06	20th
75	OFK Odžaci	1	30	6	8	16	24	35	26	–	–	–	2016–17	2016–17	15th
76	Temnić 1924	1	30	6	8	16	24	47	26	–	–	–	2017–18	2017–18	14th
77	Radnički Šid	1	34	7	5	22	26	50	26	–	–	–	2010–11	2010–11	17th
78	Obilić	1	38	0	6	32	16	83	6	–	–	–	2006–07	2006–07	20th
79	**Bor 1919**	0	0	0	0	0	0	0	0	–	–	–	2026–27	2026–27	–
80	**Proleter 023**	0	0	0	0	0	0	0	0	–	–	–	2026–27	2026–27	–

== Players ==
=== Top scorers ===
As of May 28, 2023

Ten players with most goals in the Serbian First League (2006–present)
Player		Period	Club(s)	Goals
1	(Serbia) Nenad Lukić	2010–2011 / 2015–2016 / 2016–2017 / 2018–2019	Teleoptik / Bežanija / Zemun / Inđija / TSC	50
2	(Serbia) Slobodan Dinčić	2010–2011 / 2012–2014 / 2014–2016	BASK / Čukarički / Metalac / Javor / Kolubara / Zemun	47
3	(Serbia) Jovan Jovanović	2007 / 2010–2015 / 2017 / 2019–2021	Radnički Niš / Sinđelić Niš / Sloga Kraljevo / Radnik Surdulica / Novi Pazar / Kolubara / Dubočica	43
4	(Serbia) Slađan Nikodijević	2012 / 2014–2015 / 2016–2018 / 2019–2021	Borac Čačak / Metalac / Bačka / ČSK / Inđija / Radnički 1923	39
=5	(Serbia) Predrag Živadinović	2008–2011 / 2012–2014	BSK Borča / Radnički 1923 / Metalac / Mladost Lučani	35
=5	(Serbia) Srđan Vujaklija	2007–2009 / 2012 / 2013–2015 / 2022–	Novi Sad / Banat / Proleter Novi Sad	35
= 5	(Serbia) Ognjen Damnjanović	2009–2011 / 2015–2016 / 2017–2019	Proleter Novi Sad / Napredak / Mačva / TSC / Inđija	35
8	(Serbia) Nikola Vujošević	2007–2011 / 2012–2013	Zemun / Kolubara	34
=9	(Serbia) Ivan Marković	2012 / 2018–2019	Banat / Javor	33
=9	(Serbia) Krsta Đorđević	2018–2020 / 2022–	Žarkovo / OFK Bačka / Radnički Sremska Mitrovica	33

=== Most apps ===
As of May 28, 2023

Ten players with most apps in the Serbian First League (2006–present)
Player		Period	Club(s)	Apps
1	(Serbia) Nikola Nedeljković	2008–2014 / 2016–2020 / 2021–present	Bežanija / Budućnost Dobanovci / Zlatibor / Inđija	263
2	(Serbia) Saša Tomanović	2008–2010 / 2011–2015 / 2017–2019 / 2023–	Mladost Apatin / Inđija / Radnički Sombor / TSC / Železničar Pančevo	223
=3	(Serbia) Filip Bajić	2010–2016 / 2019–2021	Novi Sad / Inđija / Bečej / Dinamo Vranje	206
=3	(Serbia) Branko Žigić	2007–2017	Proleter Novi Sad	206
5	(Serbia) Milovan Petrić	2012–2013 / 2014–2017 / 2018–	Novi Sad / BSK Borča / Proleter Novi Sad / Kolubara / Bečej 1918 / Kabel / OFK Bačka / OFK Vršac	201
6	(Serbia) Milan Janjić	2015–2019 / 2020–	Bežanija / Budućnost Dobanovci / Inđija	193
7	(Serbia) Dušan Plavšić	2012–2018 / 2021–2022	Mladenovac / Dolina Padina / Sloboda Užice / Jedinstvo Užice / BSK Borča / Kolubara / Proleter Novi Sad / Železničar Pančevo	191
8	(Bosnia and Herzegovina) Nemanja Matović	2010–2018	Bežanija / Mačva / Radnički Pirot / Sinđelić Beograd	190
9	(Serbia) Nemanja Milovanović	2010–2013 / 2017–2020	Napredak / Teleoptik / Mačva / Dinamo Vranje / Javor / Bačka / Kolubara	189
10	(Serbia) Aleksandar Stojković	2008 / 2009–2010 / 2013 / 2014 / 2015–2018 / 2019–2020	Mladost Apatin / Radnički Sombor / Voždovac / Metalac / Kolubara / Dinamo Vranje / Budućnost Dobanovci	188

== Names of the competition ==
- 2022–2028: Mozzart Bet First League
