= FK SU Dinamo Jug =

Serbian football club

SU Dinamo Jug
- Full name: Fudbalski klub Sportsko Udruženje Dinamo Jug
- Founded: 2022; 4 years ago
- Dissolved: 2026
- Ground: Yumco Vranje Stadium
- Capacity: 2,500
- President: Dragan Stevanović
- Head coach: Ivica Milutinović
- League: Serbian First League
- 2024–25: Serbian League East, 1st of 16 (champions)
- Website: sudinamojug.com
Home colours	Away colours

FK SU Dinamo Jug is a football club based in Vranje, Serbia. As of the 2025-26 season, they compete in the second-tier Serbian First League.

== History ==
After the collapse of FK Dinamo Vranje, the new Vranje-based SU Dinamo Jug was founded in 2022 and started in the 5th-tier Pčinja District League. After three successive promotions they find themselves back in the country's second tier for the 2025-26 season.

== Seasons ==
Season	Division	P	W	D	L	F	A	Pts	Pos
2022–23	5 - Pčinja District League	23	17	3	3	57	24	54	2nd (Note: Promoted due to expansion of the Zone League South in 23/24.)
2023–24	4 - Zone League South	34	24	7	3	80	16	79	1st
2024–25	3 - Serbian League East	30	20	4	6	65	29	64	1st

== Players ==
=== Current squad ===
As of 6 April 2026

Note: Flags indicate national team as defined under FIFA eligibility rules; some limited exceptions apply. Players may hold more than one non-FIFA nationality.

No.	Pos.	Nation	Player
1	GK	SRB	Filip Novaković
2	DF	SRB	Ilija Miodragović
3	MF	SRB	Lazar Selenić
4	MF	SRB	Danilo Nešić
5	DF	SRB	Filip Stamenković (captain)
7	MF	SRB	Petar Đuričković
8	MF	SRB	Luka Stojanović
9	FW	SRB	Marko Nikolić
10	FW	SRB	Filip Gligorijević
11	DF	SRB	Marko Jovićević
12	GK	SRB	Strahinja Jović
13	FW	SRB	Lukijan Abadžija
14	DF	SRB	Miloš Petrović
16	DF	SRB	Milan Spremo

No.	Pos.	Nation	Player
17	FW	SRB	Marko Vranješ
18	FW	SRB	Nenad Gavrić
19	DF	SRB	Predrag Popadić
20	MF	SRB	Mihajlo Butraković (on loan from Vojvodina)
21	FW	SRB	David Milićević
22	GK	SRB	Ognjen Ristić
23	MF	SRB	Đorđe Belić
24	DF	SRB	Dejan Đurić
25	DF	SRB	Veljko Pražić
27	FW	SRB	Aleksa Dušanić
28	MF	SRB	Marko Stojanović
29	FW	MNE	Vasilije Delibašić
30	FW	SRB	Aleksandar Katanić

=== Coaching staff ===
Position	Name
Manager	(Serbia) Ivica Milutinović
Assistant manager	(Serbia) Marko Petrović
Mental coach	(Serbia) Nikola Spasić
Goalkeeping coach	(Serbia) Bojan Mugoša
Doctor	(Serbia) Milutin Đurić
Economic	(Serbia) Ivan Đorđević (Serbia) Lazar Stanojković
Physiotherapist	(Serbia) Goran Mitrović
General secretary	(Serbia) Bratislav Vučković

== Notable players ==
For a list of all Dinamo Jug players with a Wikipedia article, see Category:FK Dinamo Jug players.
