= FK Proleter Novi Sad =

Serbian football club

Proleter Novi Sad
- Full name: Fudbalski Klub Proleter Novi Sad
- Founded: 1951; 75 years ago
- Dissolved: 2022
- Ground: Stadion Slana Bara
- Capacity: 2,000
- 2021–22: Serbian SuperLiga, 16th of 16 (relegated)
- Website: fkproleternovisad.rs
Home colours	Away colours	Third colours

FK Proleter Novi Sad (Serbian Cyrillic: ФК Пролетер Нови Сад) is a defunct football club based in Novi Sad, Vojvodina, Serbia. They competed in the Serbian SuperLiga for four seasons between 2018 and 2022, before merging with RFK Novi Sad 1921.

== History ==
Founded in 1951, the club won the Serbian League Vojvodina in the 2008–09 season and took promotion to the Serbian First League. They spent the following nine years in the second tier of Serbian football, before winning the title and earning promotion to the Serbian SuperLiga for the first time in their history. During this period, the club also reached the Serbian Cup round of 16 on five occasions. They would finish in eight place in their debut appearance in the top flight. After spending four seasons in the Serbian SuperLiga, the club suffered relegation in 2021–22, before merging with RFK Novi Sad 1921.

== Honours ==
Serbian First League (Tier 2)

- 2017–18

Serbian League Vojvodina (Tier 3)

- 2008–09

== Seasons ==
Season	League									Cup
Season	Division	Pld	W	D	L	GF	GA	Pts	Pos	Cup
Serbia and Montenegro
2005–06	4 – Vojvodina West	30	15	12	3	50	26	57	2nd	—
Serbia
2006–07	3 – Vojvodina	34	16	7	11	49	32	55	2nd	—
2007–08	3 – Vojvodina	30	18	6	6	54	32	60	3rd	—
2008–09	3 – Vojvodina	30	17	10	3	49	21	61	1st	—
2009–10	2	34	13	7	14	41	35	46	7th	Round of 16
2010–11	2	34	12	9	13	46	40	45	8th	Round of 16
2011–12	2	34	14	7	13	33	34	49	9th	Round of 16
2012–13	2	34	16	9	9	53	43	57	4th	Round of 32
2013–14	2	30	10	9	11	42	36	39	9th	Round of 32
2014–15	2	30	11	7	12	33	32	40	7th	Round of 16
2015–16	2	30	9	13	8	32	29	40	8th	Round of 32
2016–17	2	30	9	9	12	34	40	36	11th	Round of 32
2017–18	2	30	20	5	5	63	25	65	1st	Round of 16
2018–19	1	37	10	11	16	34	41	22	8th	Round of 32
2019–20	1	30 (Note: The season was shortened due to the COVID-19 pandemic in Serbia.)	7	9	14	30	42	30	12th	Round of 16
2020–21	1	38	15	8	15	40	47	53	8th	Round of 16
2021–22	1	37	8	8	21	25	57	32	16th	Round of 32

== Notable players ==
This is a list of players who have played at full international level.

- (Armenia) Artur Yedigaryan
- (Hungary) Predrag Bošnjak
- (Montenegro) Mirko Ivanić
- (Serbia) Aleksandar Andrejević
- (Serbia) Željko Brkić
- (Serbia) Nemanja Čović
- (Serbia) Marko Ilić
- (Serbia) Branislav Jovanović
- (Serbia) Andrija Kaluđerović
- (Serbia) Milan Makarić
- (Serbia) Aleksa Pejić
- (Serbia) Emil Rockov

For a list of all FK Proleter Novi Sad players with a Wikipedia article, see Category:FK Proleter Novi Sad players.

== Historical list of coaches ==
Period	Name
2009–2010	(Serbia) Ljubomir Ristovski
2011	(Serbia) Nenad Cerović
2011	(Serbia) Zoran Govedarica
2011–2013	(Serbia) Nenad Lalatović
2013	(Serbia) Saša Milanović
2013–2014	(Serbia) Zoran Marić
2014–2015	(Serbia) Zoran Govedarica
2015	(Bulgaria) Zoran Janković
2016	(Serbia) Zoltan Sabo
2016	(Serbia) Zoran Govedarica
2016–2017	(Serbia) Zoltan Sabo

Period	Name
2017	(Serbia) Zoran Govedarica
2017	(Serbia) Nenad Cerović
2018	(Serbia) Nenad Vanić
2018–2019	(Montenegro) Dragan Radojičić
2019	(Serbia) Milić Ćurčić
2019–2021	(Serbia) Branko Žigić
2021	(Serbia) Sekula Rašiovan (caretaker)
2021	(Serbia) Branko Žigić
2021–2022	(Serbia) Dušan Bajić
2022	(Serbia) Zumbul Mahalbašić
