= Ivica Milutinović =

Serbian footballer

Personal information
- Full name: Ivica Milutinović
- Date of birth: 20 October 1983 (age 43)
- Place of birth: Titova Mitrovica, SFR Yugoslavia
- Height: 1.80 m (5 ft 11 in)
- Position: Left-back

Senior career*
Years	Team	Apps	(Gls)
2003–2005	Mladi Obilić	34	(1)
2005–2008	Radnički Obrenovac	82	(3)
2008–2010	Banat Zrenjanin	47	(1)
2010–2012	Ethnikos Achna	46	(0)
2012–2013	BSK Borča	23	(1)
2014	Borac Čačak	10	(1)
2015	BSK Borča	3	(0)
2015	Oulu PS	18	(1)

Managerial career
- 2025: Mladost Novi Sad
- * Club domestic league appearances and goals as of 6 April 2015

Ivica Milutinović (Serbian Cyrillic: Ивица Милутиновић; born 20 October 1983) is a Serbian footballer.

He was manager of Mladost GAT in 2025, until the club withdrew from all competitions.
