= Stadion Karađorđev park =

Football stadium in Zrenjanin, Serbia

Karađorđe's Park
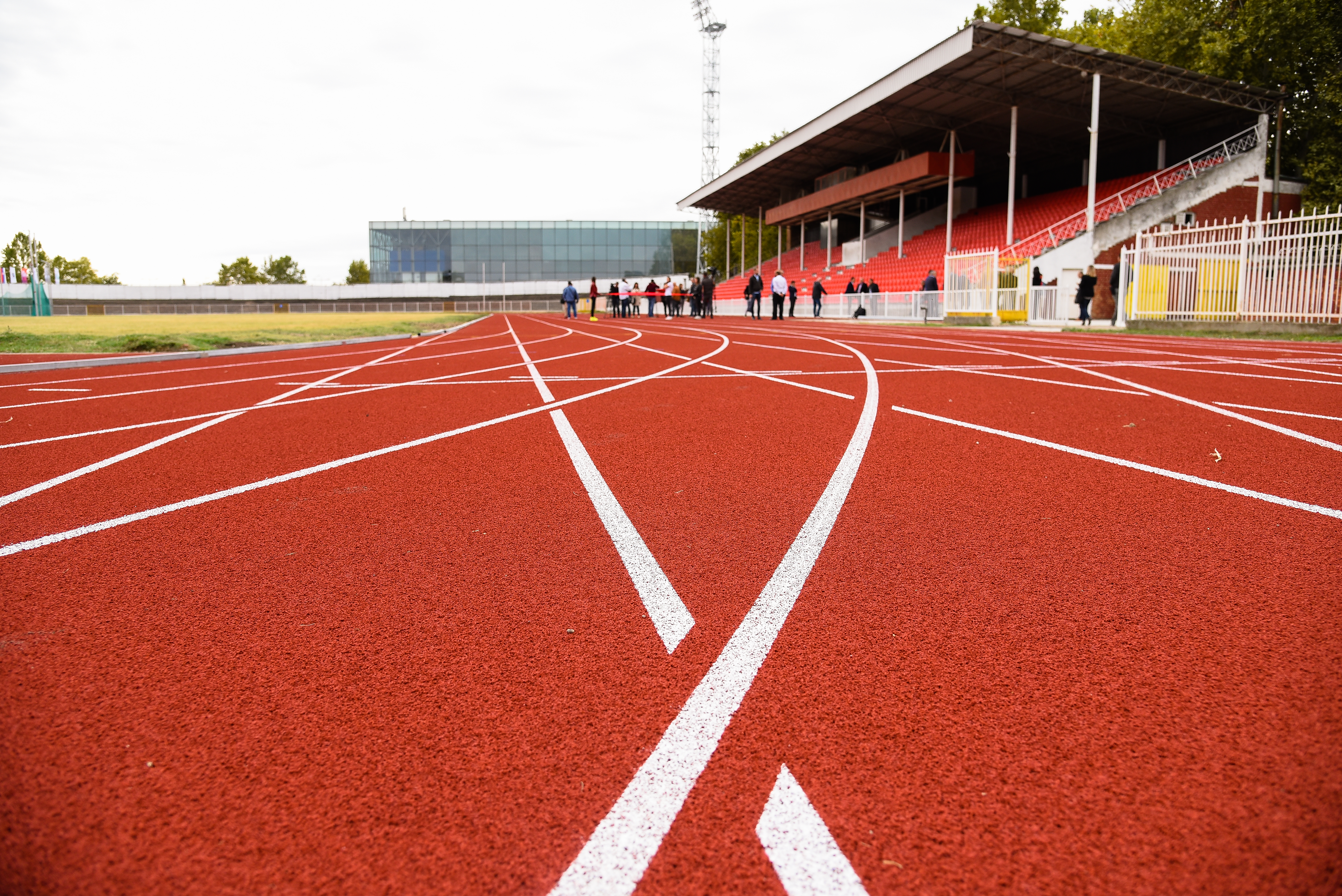
- Interactive map of Karađorđe's Park
- Full name: Karađorđe's Park Stadium
- Location: Zrenjanin, Serbia
- Coordinates: 45°23′12″N 20°23′55″E
- Capacity: 13,500

Construction
- Opened: 5 May 1953; 73 years ago

Tenants
- Banat Zrenjanin; Proleter Zrenjanin; Proleter 023 (2026–present)

Karađorđe's Park Stadium (Serbian: Стадион Карађорђев парк / Stadion Karađorđev park) is a multi-purpose stadium in Zrenjanin, Serbia. It is used mostly for football matches. The stadium had capacity 9,500 including 5,943 individual seats and can accommodate 11,000 spectators if standing room allowed.

== Gallery ==
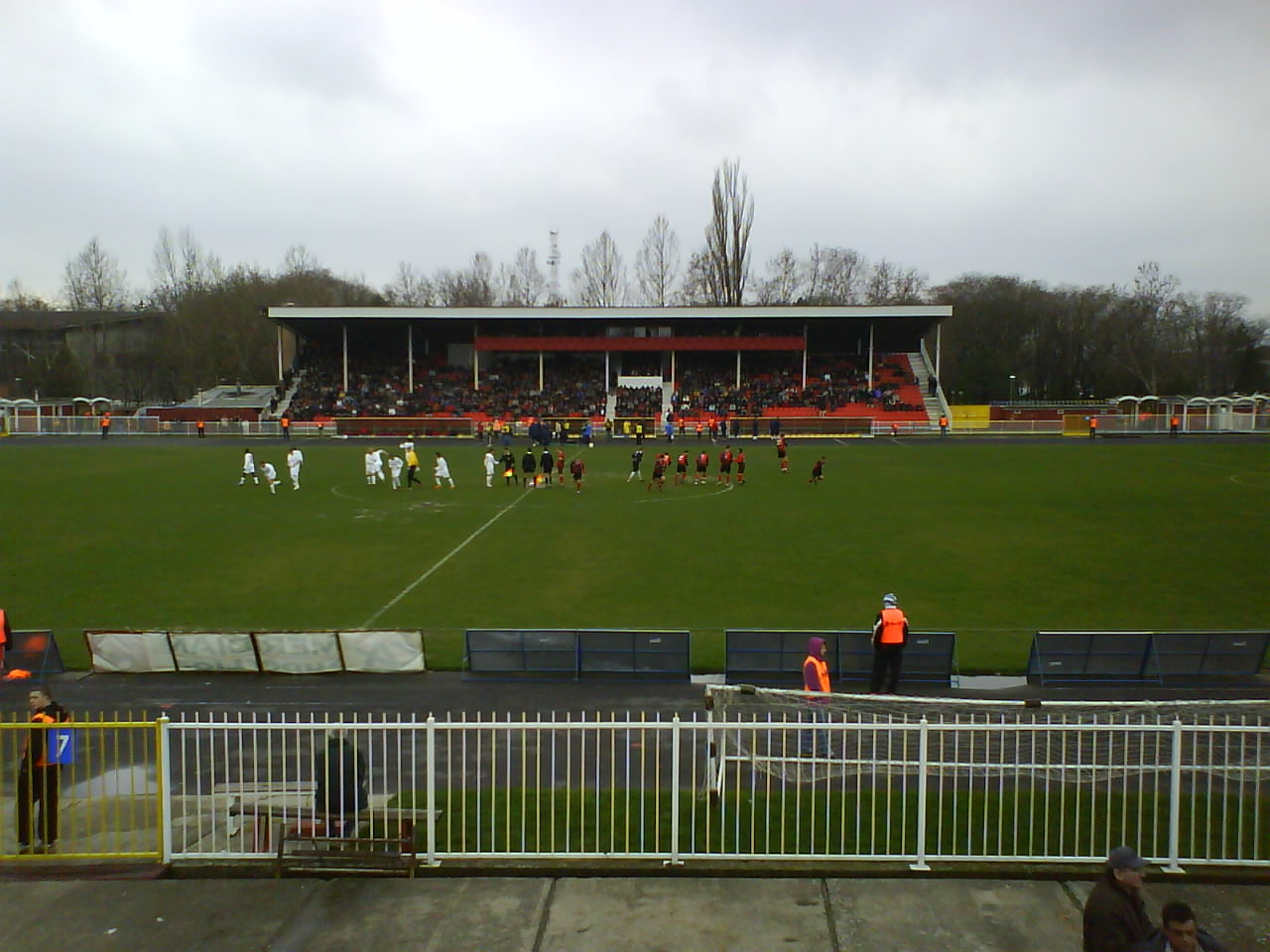

== See also ==
- List of stadiums in Serbia
- Crystal Hall, Zrenjanin
