= FK Radnički Šid =

Serbian football club

Radnički Šid
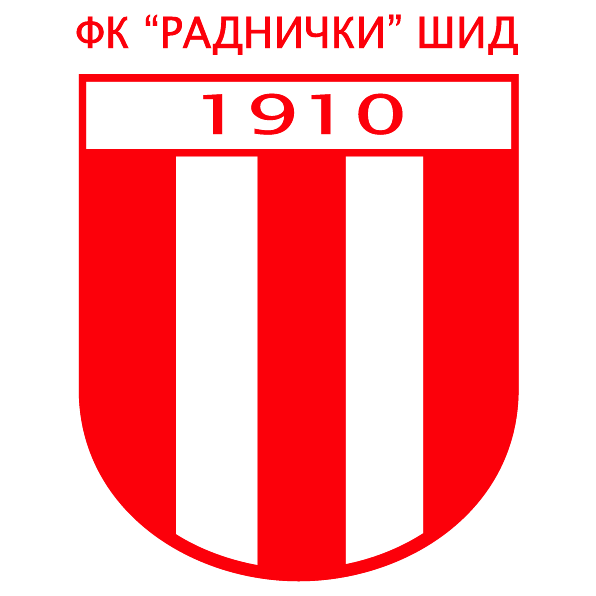
- Full name: Fudbalski Klub Radnički 1910
- Founded: 1910; 116 years ago
- Ground: Gradski (City) Stadium, Šid
- Capacity: 1,000
- President: Predrag Panić
- Head coach: Milan Mitrović
- League: Vojvodina League South
- 2024–25: Vojvodina League South, 15th of 16
Home colours	Away colours

FK Radnički 1910 (Serbian Cyrillic: ФК Раднички Шид) is a football club based in Šid, Vojvodina, Serbia. They compete in the Vojvodina League South, the fourth tier of the national league system.

== History ==
In June 2010, Radnički merged with 2009–10 Serbian League Vojvodina champions Big Bull Bačinci to compete under the name Big Bull Radnički in the 2010–11 Serbian First League. They finished second from the bottom in their debut season in the second tier, thus suffering relegation back to the Serbian League Vojvodina. Afterwards, the club continued competing under the name Radnički in the 2011–12 Serbian League Vojvodina.

== Honours ==
PFL Sremska Mitrovica (Tier 5)

- 2020–21

== Seasons ==
Season	League									Cup
Season	Division	Pld	W	D	L	GF	GA	Pts	Pos	Cup
Serbia
2010–11	2	34	7	5	22	26	50	26	17th	—
2011–12	3 – Vojvodina	28	11	9	8	35	27	42	5th	Preliminary round
2012–13	3 – Vojvodina	30	14	3	13	39	39	45	5th	—
2013–14	3 – Vojvodina	30	11	10	9	42	37	43	7th	—
2014–15	3 – Vojvodina	30	8	10	12	38	41	34	13th	—
2015–16	3 – Vojvodina	30	9	11	10	22	23	38	10th	—
2016–17	3 – Vojvodina	28	9	4	15	24	45	31	13th	—
2017–18	3 – Vojvodina	30	3	1	26	15	104	10	16th	—
2018–19	4 – Vojvodina South	28	12	4	12	49	39	40	11th	—
2019–20	5 – Sremska Mitrovica	17 (Note: The season was cut short due to the COVID-19 pandemic in Serbia.)	9	3	5	27	17	30	4th	—
2020–21	5 – Sremska Mitrovica	34	24	6	4	84	25	78	1st	—
2021–22	4 – Vojvodina South	30	13	6	11	45	34	45	5th	—
2022–23	4 – Vojvodina South	30	3	7	20	24	56	16	16th	—
2023–24	4 – Vojvodina South	30	9	4	17	41	65	31	13th	—
2024–25	4 – Vojvodina South	30	7	4	19	21	56	25	15th	—

== Notable players ==
For a list of all FK Radnički Šid players with a Wikipedia article, see Category:FK Radnički Šid players.
