= Antics =

Antics may refer to:

== Computing ==
- Antics 2-D Animation, a general-purpose animation and graphics software system for MS Windows
- Antics Technologies, a software company based in Cambridge, England
  - Antics3D, a rapid 3d animation software tool, reported as no longer available from November 2008
- The Birds and the Bees II: Antics, a 1983 video game released for the Commodore 64 and ZX Spectrum
- ANTIC, or Alpha-Numeric Television Interface Circuit, an early video system chip used in Atari microcomputers

== Other media ==
- Antics (album), a 2004 album by Interpol
- The Antics, an improvisational comedy troupe from Sheffield, England
- Antics, a 2013 album by Vundabar

== See also ==
- Antic (disambiguation)
- Antique (disambiguation)
- Antix (disambiguation)
- Shenanigans (disambiguation)
