= Antić =

Antić, Antic, Antiç or Antič (Serbian Cyrillic: Антић, Croatian pronunciation: [ǎːntitɕ]) is a Croatian and Serbian surname. It is among the 500 most common surnames in Serbia, Bosnia and Herzegovina, Croatia and Kosovo. It is derived from Antonius and its varieties, like Ante.

In Croatia it is recorded as early as in 1678. In Croatia, surname bearers are mostly from Crikvenica and Šibenik region.

It may refer to:

- Aleksandar Antić (born 1969), Serbian politician
- Alex Antic, Australian politician
- Ante Antić (1893–1956), Croatian Capuchin
- Boško Antić (1944–2007), Bosnian Serb footballer
- Čedomir Antić (born 1974), Serbian historian, political activist
- Dejan Antić (born 1968), Serbian grandmaster
- Goran Antić (born 1985), Swiss footballer
- Igor Antić (born 1962), French-Serbian visual artist
- Ivan Antić (1923–2005), Serbian architect
- Jelena Antić (born 1991), Macedonian basketball player
- Joseph Antic (1931–2016), Indian field hockey player
- Linda Antić (born 1969), Croatian basketball player and coach
- Marko Antić (born 1991), Serbian karateka
- Mika Antić (1932–1986), Yugoslav poet, film director
- Miloš Antić (born 1989), Serbian footballer
- Miloš Antić (born 1994), Serbian-Swiss footballer and entrepreneur
- Nikola Antić (born 1994), Serbian footballer
- Novica Antić (born 1978), Serbian trade unionist
- Pero Antić (born 1982), Macedonian basketballer
- Radomir Antić (1948–2020), Serbian football manager
- Saša Antić (born 1973), Croatian musician
- Sava Antić (1930–1998), Serbian footballer and manager
- Sebastijan Antić (born 1991), Croatian football player
- Slobodan Antić (born 1950), former Yugoslav footballer
- Srđan Antić (born 1960), Serbian basketball coach
- Svetlana Mugoša-Antić (born 1964), Serbian handball player
- Zoran Antić (born 1975), Serbian footballer
