= Swinstead (surname) =

Swinstead is a surname. Notable people with the surname include:

- Charles Swinstead (1815–1890), founder of the Hornsey College of Art
- Felix Swinstead (1880–1959), English pianist and composer
- Frank Swinstead (1862–1937), English cricketer and artist
- George Hillyard Swinstead (1860–1926), British artist
- Muriel Mary Swinstead (née Oriel Ross, 1907–1994), English actress
- Philip Swinstead, founder Antics Technologies
