= Antic =

Antic may refer to:

- Antić, a Serbo-Croatian surname (with a list of people surnamed Antić)
- Joseph Antic, Indian field hockey player at the 1960 Olympics
- ANTIC, a custom video chip in the Atari 8-bit computers
- Antic (magazine), a defunct American Atari computer magazine
- Antic Software, a software publisher run by Antic magazine
- Antic Collective, a British pub chain

== See also ==
- Antics (disambiguation)
