= Alan Kitching =

British graphic designer

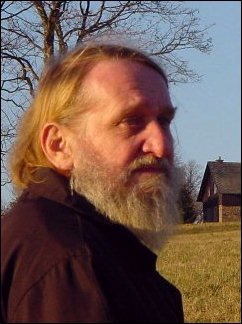
- Kitching in the Czech Republic, 2008
- Born: England
- Occupations: designer, animator, architect, software developer
- Website: antics1.demon.co.uk/ATK_biog.html

Alan Thomas Kitching is a British graphic designer, animator, architect and software developer, who is perhaps best known for his pioneering work in computer animation, creating the Antics 2-D Animation software in 1972.

== Early life ==
Alan Kitching grew up in the London suburb of Wimbledon, and was educated at King's College School, Wimbledon. There, in 1963, he was awarded an Open Scholarship to Corpus Christi College, Cambridge, where he chose to read Architecture.

In the year's gap between school and Cambridge, he worked as assistant to animator Trevor Bond, where he undertook a range of projects from commercials and educational productions, to feature film titles, including a couple of early James Bond movies.

While pursuing architectural studies, Kitching also continued promoting his enthusiasm for the animation medium, including working with Richard Arnall to help organise the first-ever British Animation Festival, in 1965.

In 1967, after completing studies in Cambridge, Kitching went to work with architect John Hornby in Wimbledon, undertaking a diverse range of private projects—from refurbishing the offices of a firm of parliamentary lawyers, to housing estates in Amersham and Beckenham, the conversion of a medieval barn in Sussex, and restoration of a listed Tudor cottage in Selborne. In 1969, he went on to work with Frederick MacManus and Partners, in Marylebone, specialising in architectural graphics, photography and signage, on freelance projects in public housing and healthcare.

== Early Animation career ==
In 1969, Kitching also collaborated with veteran Hungarian-born British animator John Halas, who had given him a pre-war 35mm animation rostrum camera. With this, he produced "The Dream of Arthur Sleap", a cinema commercial for the British Film Institute (BFI), and "Auntie Takes A Trip" for the British Kinematograph, Sound and Television Society (BKSTS).

In 1970, he directed and animated "No Arks" for the BFI Production Board, a film based on a story and cartoons by Abu Abraham (the then political cartoonist of The Observer newspaper), with narration by Vanessa Redgrave.

In the same year, he also published "An Animation Primer"—an overview of animation technique, which formed one section of a larger part-work publication "The Craft of Film" from Attic Publishing Ltd.

From 1971, Kitching also published a number of articles in the BKSTS Journal on animation and media in general, including "Computer Animation – Answer or Problem?" in which he examined the possibilities offered to animators by emerging computer graphics techniques.

== The Birth of "Antics" ==
In 1972, this led to an invitation from computer artist Colin Emmett for Kitching to join him at the Atlas Computer Laboratory to try programming, using Fortran.

By early next year, he had completed a general-purpose animation program, which he named "Antics". This he subsequently used for numerous animation works, culminating in the 1975 film "Finite Elements", a documentary explaining the mathematical principles of the Finite Elements method for computing engineering simulations, and how it had been used at the Atlas Lab.

Kitching first presented the Antics system at the BKSTS "Film 73" conference in London, and it was then published in the BKST Journal of December 73. In 1974 Kitching was awarded the Society's "Denis Wratten" award for technical achievement of the year.

Around 1975, he first met Czech interior designer Eva Gloss, recently emigrated to Britain from (then) Czechoslovakia, who was later to become his partner. Also at this time, Kitching founded "Grove Park Studio Animations".

Further articles and presentations followed, including one to the Swedish Film Institute in Stockholm, which led to Kitching being invited by Swedish TV (then Sveriges Radio – 'SR') to undertake a full-scale prototype project to develop a new version of Antics that would be fully interactive, so that it could be used by any complete beginner without technical knowledge. The project ran from 1977 to 1979, culminating in the movie "The Story of G".

== Developments in Japan ==
In 1980, after installation of ANTICS using a SIEMENS 330 at Technical University Vienna, Japanese computer maker Nippon Univac Kaisha (NUK) invited Kitching to set up a further Antics development project in Tokyo, to make use of the newest full-colour hardware and VTR equipment. This project ran between 1980 and 1982, and now made the system fully commercial. The first user system was installed at Nippon Animation, and more studios followed—a dozen or so in Japan alone.

In 1983, Kitching met again with Eva Gloss, who had been producing hand-made ceramic dolls in Southampton, but was now living in London, and the two became partners.

Later in the year, in conjunction with Tokyo graphic designer Yukio Ota, Kitching produced a movie for the United Nations University (UNU), with a commentary by Peter Ustinov. Kitching made the film at NUK, with the assistance of Eva Gloss. Titled "Sharing for Survival", the film completed early 1984.

== Establishing the Home Studio ==
In 1985, the DEC "MicroVax II" became the first mini-computer powerful enough to run Antics, yet also run from a normal domestic power socket. Kitching soon installed one at home, so for the first time had his own Antics studio, and was able to continue its development.

In subsequent years, two further new hardware platforms for Antics became available, from Silicon Graphics and Apple Macintosh. With these, many new Antics studios sprang up in Europe, USA, and beyond. In 1989, Kitching was awarded a Fellowship of BKSTS.

In 1989 Alan and Eva worked on a film called Our People - HIV & AIDS in the Black Communities funded by the Dept of Health and directed by Ash Kotak. The very well received film won a British Medical Association Silver Award.

== Moving into Multimedia ==
In the early 1990s, hardware costs were coming down just as performance speeds were increasing. Kitching saw that Microsoft's Windows PC platforms would soon be suitable for Antics, and began concentrating on the emerging market of PC multimedia production.

By the late 1990s, the advent of powerful PC and other graphics-based machines were making older systems obsolete, and Kitching saw that this would require a complete new version of the Antics software, using a different design language (C++) – a large-scale project, beyond current resources.

Instead, Kitching concentrated on a new field, using computer graphics for scientific modelling of architectural designs for how people move through large public spaces. From 1998, Kitching worked with Legion Crowd Dynamics, and from 2001, with Prof G.Keith Still.

== Lanzarote and the New Antics ==
In 2004, Kitching and Eva Gloss left Britain to move both to the Czech Republic and to the Canary Isles, exchanging their London home for a cottage in the Czech mountains, and a villa in Lanzarote. Alternating between the Czech cottage and Lanzarote, the couple refurbished the cottage, eventually selling it to move permanently to Lanzarote in 2009.

Meanwhile, in 2006, Kitching determined that Antics software still had no close rival on the market, and could now concentrate fully on developing a new 21st-century version, dubbed "Antics Classic++". The first version of this for Windows was launched for download in 2010, and further updates completed it for the Summer 2011 Edition. Kitching subsequently continued developing the concept, with additional new updates issued periodically, taking it to new functionality beyond the original Antics "Classic" concepts.

== Bibliography ==
- 1970 "The Craft of Film / Part VIII – An Animation Primer", Attic Publishing Ltd. A comprehensive introduction to the art and techniques of conventional animation.
- 1971 "VIS-COM '71 – Visual Communications and the Learning Industry", British Kinematography Sound and Television journal, Sep 71, pp 348–353, report on the international conference organised by ICOGRADA in Vienna, that July.
- 1971 "VIS-COM '71 – When is a Revolution Not a Revolution?", British Kinematography Sound and Television journal, Oct 71, pp 380–383, reporting on new developments presented at the Vis-Com 71 conference in Vienna, and commenting on possible future implications.
- 1971 "Computer Animation: Answer or Problem?", British Kinematography Sound and Television journal, Dec 71, pp 436–441, article examining the emerging field of computer animation, and assessing its possible future potential and implications.
- 1973 "Computer Animation, Some New Antics", British Kinematography Sound and Television journal, Dec 73, pp 372–386, Kitching's original introduction to the creation of Antics.
- 1974 "Computer Animation – A Few More Antics", The BKSTS Journal, Mar 74, pp 58–64, article based on questions and answers from Kitching's presentations at Film 73 and the NFT John Player Lecture.
- 1974 "Computer Animation with Antics", Journal of the Society of Film and Television Arts, Autumn/Winter 74/75. pp 33–39. A further description of the original Antics system at the Atlas Laboratory.
- 1975 "Cinema et animation d'images", (in French), IBM-Informatique, no 13, p56, IBM France, 1975.
- 1975 "Antics – Ny Animationskraft", (in Swedish), TM, magazine of the Swedish Film Institute, July 75, pp 15–21. Essentially, a Swedish translation of Kitching's article for the Society of Film and TV Arts Journal.
- 1975 "Computer Animation with Antics", Medical and Biological Illustration magazine, 1975, 25, pp 223–230, reprint of article of the same name in the Journal of the Society of Film and Television Arts, but additionally including description of the Antics Sound program—possibly the first all-digital sound synthesiser.
- 1977 "Antics – Graphic Animation By Computer", Computers & Graphics, vol 2, pp 219–223, describes Antics as being implemented in Swedish TV.
- 1979 "Antics Animation at Swedish Television", Television, journal of the Royal Television Society, Mar/Apr 79, pp 11–14, article describing the interactive version of Antics developed at Swedish TV.
- 1980 "Antics – From Stone-Age to Steam Age", The BKSTS Journal magazine, Aug 80, pp 394–404, major article outlining future developments towards full real-time interactivity.
- 1985 "Animation – The State of The Art", interview with Kitching by Fergal Ringrose, International Broadcasting magazine, June 1985, pp 16–25, includes interview and extensive description of Antics.
- 1985 "Alan Kitching and ANTICS Computer Animation", interview with Kitching by Ken Clark, Animator magazine, no 13, Summer 1985, 3 pp.
- 1988 "Cartoons, Computers and Antics", Animator magazine, no 23, Aug 88, pp 29–31 & cover. General introductory article.
- 1988 "Cartoons, Computers and Antics – Part 2", Animator magazine, no 24, Winter 88, 5 pp. Detailed account of Antics.
- 1989 "2-D's Cartoon Antics", interview with Kitching by Ian Grant, Computer Images International magazine, Sep 89, pp 20–22, interview and feature on Antics.
- 1989 "Animated Macintosh", A/UXtra, newsletter, Winter 89/90, pp 16–17, article introducing Antics on Macintosh.

== Filmography ==
- 1969 "The Dream of Arthur Sleap", a cinema commercial for the British Film Institute.
- 1970 "No Arks", made from story and cartoons by Abu Abraham, with narration by Vanessa Redgrave, for the BFI Production Board.
- 1970 "Auntie Takes a Trip", a potted history of radio broadcasting in Britain, for the BKSTS.
- 1972 "The Burke Special", title sequence for BBC TV, with Colin Emmett.
- 1973 "Antics Flying Cube", original computer show film, for the Atlas Computing Division.
- 1974 "Antibiotic Bacteria", medical animation for MediCine Ltd.
- 1974 "The Nature of Chemistry", chemical animation inserts for the Open University.
- 1975 "Finite Elements", documentary on computing engineering simulations, for the Atlas Computing Division.
- 1979 "The Story of G", in black-and-white, for Swedish TV.
- 1982 "Symbols for International Understanding", pilot for United Nations University, with Ota Yukio.
- 1983 "The FGS 4000", promotional animation for Robert Bosch Inc of Salt Lake City.
- 1984 "Sharing for Survival", documentary for United Nations University, with Yukio Ota & Eva Gloss, and commentary by Peter Ustinov.
- 1986 "Pythagoras in 60 Seconds", short educational film, for Antics Workshop.
- 1987 "The Story of G", re-mastered in full color, for Swedish TV and Antics Workshop.
- 1990 "Our People", animation for an educational film about AIDS, made with Eva Gloss, for Picture Talk Films directed by Ash Kotak. Winner of a British Medical Association Silver Award.
- 1994 "Looking After Yourself", animation for an educational film on diabetes, for the British Diabetic Association, made with Eva Gloss, for Picture Talk Films directed by Ash Kotak.
