= 2018–19 Serbian SuperLiga =

13th season of Serbian SuperLiga

SuperLiga
- Season: 2018–19
- Dates: 21 July 2018 – 19 May 2019
- Champions: Red Star; 5th SuperLiga title 30th domestic title
- Relegated: Dinamo Vranje; Zemun; Bačka
- Champions League: Red Star
- Europa League: Radnički Niš; Partizan; Čukaricki
- Matches: 296
- Goals: 697 (2.35 per match)
- Top goalscorer: Nermin Haskić (24)
- Biggest home win: Zemun 7–0 Bačka
- Biggest away win: Vojvodina 0–5 Red Star
- Highest scoring: Zemun 7–0 Bačka; Čukaricki 6–1 Dinamo Vranje; Čukaricki 5–2 Napredak
- Longest winning run: Radnički Niš 11 games
- Longest unbeaten run: Red Star 31 games
- Longest winless run: Rad 22 games
- Longest losing run: Dinamo Vranje 8 games

The 2018–19 Serbian SuperLiga was the thirteenth season of the Serbian SuperLiga, the top tier of football league in Serbia. Red Star was the defending champions from the previous season.

== Teams ==
Locations of the 2018–19 Serbian SuperLiga teams

The league consisted of 16 teams: fourteen teams from the 2017–18 Serbian SuperLiga and two new teams from the 2017–18 Serbian First League.

Teams promoted to the SuperLiga

The first club to be promoted was Proleter Novi Sad, following their 3–1 win against Radnički 1923 on 20 May 2018. Proleter will play in the Serbian SuperLiga for the first time in their history. It will also be first time ever that two teams from Novi Sad are members of top flight.

The second club to be promoted was Dinamo Vranje, following their 1–1 draw with Novi Pazar on 26 May 2018. Dinamo will play in the Serbian SuperLiga for the first time in their history.

Teams relegated to the First League

The first club to be relegated was Borac Čačak, who were relegated on 5 May 2018 following a 2–1 defeat against Rad, ending their 4-year stay in the top flight.

The second and final club to be relegated was Javor Ivanjica, who were relegated on 17 May 2018 following their 1–1 draw with Rad, ending their 3-year stay in the top flight.

=== Venues ===
Club	City	Stadium	Capacity
Bačka	Bačka Palanka	Stadion Slavko Maletin Vava	4,000
Čukarički	Belgrade	Čukarički Stadium	4,070
Dinamo Vranje	Vranje	Surdulica City Stadium	3,312
Mačva	Šabac	Mačva Stadium	5,494
Mladost	Lučani	Mladost Stadium	5,944
Napredak	Kruševac	Mladost Stadium	10,331
Partizan	Belgrade	Partizan Stadium	32,710
Proleter	Novi Sad	Karađorđe Stadium	14,458
Rad	Belgrade	King Peter I Stadium	3,919
Radnički	Niš	Čair Stadium	18,151
Radnik	Surdulica	Surdulica City Stadium	3,312
Red Star	Belgrade	Rajko Mitić Stadium	55,538
Spartak	Subotica	City Stadium	13,000
Vojvodina	Novi Sad	Karađorđe Stadium	14,458
Voždovac	Belgrade	Shopping Center Stadium	5,175
Zemun	Belgrade	Zemun Stadium	9,588

=== Personnel and kits ===
Note: Flags indicate national team as has been defined under FIFA eligibility rules. Players and Managers may hold more than one non-FIFA nationality.

Team	Head coach	Captain	Kit manufacturer	Front shirt sponsor
OFK Bačka	(Serbia) Zoran Govedarica	(Serbia) Milan Makarić	Givova	AD Podunavlje
Čukarički	(Serbia) Simo Krunić	(Serbia) Marko Docić	Adidas	Argifen
Dinamo Vranje	(Serbia) Dragan Antić	(Serbia) Miloš Antić	Nike	mt:s
Mačva Šabac	(Serbia) Darko Tešović	(Serbia) Filip Pejović	NAAI	—
Mladost Lučani	(Serbia) Nenad Milovanović	(Serbia) Ivan Milošević	Miteks	Miteks
Napredak Kruševac	(Serbia) Milorad Kosanović	(Serbia) Jovan Markoski	Givova	Delta City
Partizan	(Serbia) Savo Milošević	(Serbia) Saša Ilić	Nike	mt:s
Proleter Novi Sad	(Montenegro) Dragan Radojičić	(Serbia) Aleksandar Andrejević	NAAI	—
Rad	(Serbia) Dragan Stevanović	(Serbia) Đorđe Denić	NAAI	Srbi za Srbe
Radnički Niš	(Serbia) Nenad Lalatović	(Serbia) Aleksandar Jovanović	Hummel	mt:s
Radnik Surdulica	(Serbia) Mladen Dodić	(Serbia) Vladan Pavlović	Jako	—
Red Star Belgrade	(Serbia) Vladan Milojević	(Serbia) Nenad Milijaš	Macron	Gazprom
Spartak Subotica	(Serbia) Predrag Rogan	(Serbia) Vladimir Torbica	Legea	Ždrepčeva krv
Vojvodina	(Serbia) Radovan Krivokapić	(Serbia) Emil Rockov	Umbro	Srbijagas
Voždovac	(Serbia) Dragan Aničić	(Serbia) Miloš Pavlović	NAAI	Stadion SC
Zemun	(Serbia) Dejan Đurđević	(Serbia) Ivan Božović	Umbro	—

Nike is the official ball supplier for Serbian SuperLiga.

== Transfers ==
For the list of transfers involving SuperLiga clubs during 2018–19 season, please see: List of Serbian football transfers summer 2018.

== Regular season ==
=== League table ===
Pos	Team	Pld	W	D	L	GF	GA	GD	Pts	Qualification
1	Red Star Belgrade	30	27	3	0	80	16	+64	84	Qualification for the Championship round
2	Radnički Niš	30	23	6	1	58	17	+41	75	Qualification for the Championship round
3	Partizan	30	15	9	6	45	20	+25	54	Qualification for the Championship round
4	Čukarički	30	15	9	6	48	25	+23	54	Qualification for the Championship round
5	Mladost Lučani	30	13	7	10	39	29	+10	46	Qualification for the Championship round
6	Napredak Kruševac	30	10	11	9	32	35	−3	41	Qualification for the Championship round
7	Vojvodina	30	10	9	11	24	26	−2	39	Qualification for the Championship round
8	Proleter Novi Sad	30	9	11	10	31	29	+2	38	Qualification for the Championship round
9	Spartak Subotica	30	10	8	12	32	40	−8	38	Qualification for the Relegation round
10	Radnik Surdulica	30	11	5	14	25	35	−10	38	Qualification for the Relegation round
11	Voždovac	30	11	4	15	28	37	−9	37	Qualification for the Relegation round
12	Mačva Šabac	30	8	8	14	16	26	−10	32	Qualification for the Relegation round
13	Bačka	30	6	7	17	26	54	−28	25	Qualification for the Relegation round
14	Rad	30	4	9	17	16	39	−23	21	Qualification for the Relegation round
15	Dinamo Vranje	30	5	5	20	18	62	−44	20	Qualification for the Relegation round
16	Zemun	30	3	9	18	19	47	−28	18	Qualification for the Relegation round

Source: SuperLiga (in Serbian), Soccerway
Rules for classification: 1) Points; 2) Head-to-head points; 3) Head-to-head goal difference; 4) Head-to-head goals scored; 5) Head-to-head away goals scored (if two teams tied); 6) Goal difference; 7) Goals scored; 8) Fair play ranking; 9) Draw.

=== Results ===
Home \ Away	BAČ	ČUK	DVR	MAČ	MLA	NAP	PAR	PNS	RAD	RNI	RSU	RSB	SPA	VOJ	VOŽ	ZEM
OFK Bačka		1–1	5–1	0–1	0–2	3–3	0–3	0–1	1–0	0–2	1–0	1–3	2–1	0–0	1–0	2–0
Čukarički	3–0		6–1	1–0	0–0	2–1	1–1	1–0	2–1	1–1	2–0	1–2	3–1	1–0	3–0	1–1
Dinamo Vranje	1–1	0–0		1–0	1–3	4–0	0–1	2–4	0–1	0–4	0–3	0–3	1–0	1–3	1–2	1–0
Mačva Šabac	2–0	1–0	0–0		0–1	1–0	1–3	2–1	0–0	0–0	1–2	0–2	0–0	0–0	2–0	0–2
Mladost Lučani	5–0	3–4	2–0	1–2		2–0	1–1	1–0	0–0	0–1	1–0	1–3	2–1	1–0	3–1	2–1
Napredak Kruševac	1–1	1–1	3–0	2–0	4–1		1–0	1–1	1–0	1–2	1–1	0–3	0–0	0–0	0–0	1–0
Partizan	1–0	3–2	6–0	0–0	0–0	1–1		3–0	1–0	0–1	2–0	1–1	1–3	2–0	4–0	1–0
Proleter Novi Sad	3–0	0–0	0–0	1–0	2–0	1–1	0–1		0–0	1–2	0–0	0–2	2–2	0–1	2–1	4–1
Rad	1–1	0–3	1–1	1–0	1–1	0–2	0–3	1–3		0–0	3–1	0–3	1–1	0–1	0–1	2–2
Radnički Niš	5–1	2–0	2–0	3–0	1–0	3–3	2–2	3–1	2–0		4–1	2–2	3–0	1–0	1–0	2–0
Radnik Surdulica	3–2	1–0	2–0	0–1	1–0	1–0	1–0	0–0	1–0	1–2		0–1	0–0	0–1	2–1	2–1
Red Star Belgrade	3–1	2–1	3–0	2–1	2–1	3–0	1–1	4–0	3–1	2–0	6–0		3–0	4–0	2–0	4–0
Spartak Subotica	3–0	1–2	2–0	1–0	1–0	0–1	0–0	0–4	1–0	1–4	3–2	1–3		0–1	3–2	2–2
Vojvodina	2–0	0–0	2–0	1–1	1–1	0–1	3–2	0–0	1–2	0–1	1–0	1–4	1–2		3–0	0–0
Voždovac	1–0	1–3	2–0	1–0	1–1	4–0	1–0	0–0	2–0	0–1	1–0	1–2	0–0	1–0		3–1
Zemun	2–2	0–3	1–2	0–0	0–3	0–2	0–1	0–0	1–0	0–1	0–0	1–2	0–2	1–1	2–1	

Source: SuperLiga (in Serbian)
Legend: Blue = home team win; Yellow = draw; Red = away team win.
For upcoming matches, an "a" indicates there is an article about the rivalry between the two participants.

== Play-offs ==
=== Championship round ===
The top eight teams advanced from the regular season. Points from the regular season were halved with half points rounded up. Teams played each other once.

==== League table ====
Pos	Team	Pld	W	D	L	GF	GA	GD	Pts	Qualification
1	Red Star Belgrade (C)	37	33	3	1	97	20	+77	60	Qualification for the Champions League first qualifying round
2	Radnički Niš	37	25	10	2	71	30	+41	48	Qualification for the Europa League first qualifying round
3	Partizan	37	20	9	8	58	28	+30	42	Qualification for the Europa League second qualifying round (Note: Partizan qualified for the Europa League second qualifying round by winning the 2018–19 Serbian Cup. As a result, the spot awarded to the third-placed team (Europa League first qualifying round) was passed to the fourth-placed team.)
4	Čukarički	37	18	12	7	63	36	+27	39	Qualification for the Europa League first qualifying round
5	Mladost Lučani	37	16	9	12	49	37	+12	34	
6	Napredak Kruševac	37	12	12	13	46	50	−4	28	
7	Vojvodina	37	10	11	16	27	43	−16	22 (Note: Vojvodina finished ahead of Proleter on regular season points: Vojvodina 39 pts, Proleter 38 pts.)	
8	Proleter Novi Sad	37	10	11	16	34	41	−7	22	

Source: SuperLiga (in Serbian), Soccerway
Rules for classification: 1) Points; 2) Head-to-head points; 3) Head-to-head goal difference; 4) Head-to-head goals scored; 5) Head-to-head away goals scored (if two teams tied); 6) Goal difference; 7) Goals scored; 8) Fair play ranking; 9) Draw.
(C) Champions

==== Results ====
Home \ Away	ČUK	MLA	NAP	PAR	PNS	RNI	RSB	VOJ
Čukarički			5–2		3–0		3–2	1–1
Mladost Lučani	1–1		2–1					3–1
Napredak Kruševac					2–0	3–3		5–0
Partizan	3–0	2–1	2–1		2–0			
Proleter Novi Sad		0–1				2–3	0–1	
Radnički Niš	2–2	2–2		3–1				0–0
Red Star Belgrade		1–0	3–0	2–1		3–0		
Vojvodina				1–2	0–1		0–5	

Source: SuperLiga (in Serbian)
Legend: Blue = home team win; Yellow = draw; Red = away team win.
For upcoming matches, an "a" indicates there is an article about the rivalry between the two participants.

=== Relegation round ===
The bottom eight teams from the regular season play in the relegation round. Points from the regular season are halved with half points rounded up. Teams play each other once.

==== League table ====
Pos	Team	Pld	W	D	L	GF	GA	GD	Pts	Qualification or relegation
9	Radnik Surdulica	37	13	8	16	38	45	−7	28	
10	Spartak Subotica	37	12	10	15	41	49	−8	27	
11	Voždovac	37	12	7	18	36	48	−12	25 (Note: Voždovac finished ahead of Mačva on regular season points: Voždovac 37 pts, Mačva 32 pts.)	
12	Mačva Šabac	37	10	11	16	24	38	−14	25	
13	Rad	37	7	12	18	22	44	−22	23 (Note: Rad finished ahead of Dinamo on regular season points: Rad 21 pts, Dinamo 20 pts.)	
14	Dinamo Vranje (R)	37	9	6	22	24	67	−43	23	Qualification for play-off
15	Zemun (R)	37	6	12	19	36	53	−17	21	Relegation to the Serbian First League
16	Bačka (R)	37	7	9	21	31	68	−37	18	Relegation to the Serbian First League

Source: SuperLiga (in Serbian), Soccerway
Rules for classification: 1) Points; 2) Head-to-head points; 3) Head-to-head goal difference; 4) Head-to-head goals scored; 5) Head-to-head away goals scored (if two teams tied); 6) Goal difference; 7) Goals scored; 8) Fair play ranking; 9) Draw.
(R) Relegated

==== Results ====
Home \ Away	BAČ	DVR	MAČ	RAD	RSU	SPA	VOŽ	ZEM
OFK Bačka		0–1	2–2	1–2				
Dinamo Vranje						2–1	1–0	1–0
Mačva Šabac		2–0		0–0		2–1		1–5
Rad		1–0			1–0			1–1
Radnik Surdulica	1–1	1–1	3–0				4–2	
Spartak Subotica	0–1			2–0	3–3		2–1	
Voždovac	1–0		1–1	1–1				2–2
Zemun	7–0				2–1	0–0		

Source: SuperLiga (in Serbian)
Legend: Blue = home team win; Yellow = draw; Red = away team win.
For upcoming matches, an "a" indicates there is an article about the rivalry between the two participants.

== Relegations play-off ==
Two legged relegation play-off match will be played between team placed 14th at the end of relegation round and winner of Serbian First League promotion play-off.

22 May 2019	Inđija	3–0	Dinamo Vranje	Inđija Stadium
17:00	Rogač 4' (pen.); S. Dimitrov 22'; Dimitrijević 33'	Report		Attendance: 2,500; Referee: Alexandar Vasić

26 May 2019	Dinamo Vranje	2–0 (2–3 agg.)	Inđija	Yumco stadium
16:00	Ž. Dimitrov 43' (pen.), 64'	Report		Attendance: 4,000; Referee: Dragan Čolović

== Individual statistics ==
=== Top scorers ===
As of matches played on 19 May 2019.

Rank	Player	Club	Goals
1	(Bosnia and Herzegovina) Nermin Haskić	Radnički	24
2	(Cape Verde) Ricardo Gomes	Partizan	20
3	(Serbia) Ognjen Mudrinski	Čukarički	18
4	(Comoros) Ben	Red Star	17
5	(Serbia) Aleksa Vukanović	Red Star^{1}	14

^{1} Vukanović has played for Napredak until matchday 21 and scored 12 goals.

=== Hat-tricks ===
Player	For	Against	Result	Date
(Serbia) Aleksa Vukanović	Napredak	Mladost	4–1	31 October 2018
(Bosnia and Herzegovina) Nermin Haskić	Radnički Niš	Dinamo Vranje	0–4	1 December 2018
(Bosnia and Herzegovina) Nermin Haskić	Radnički Niš	Radnik Surdulica	4–1	2 March 2019
(Bosnia and Herzegovina) Nermin Haskić	Radnički Niš	Proleter	2–3	30 April 2019
(Bosnia and Herzegovina) Momčilo Mrkaić	Zemun	Bačka	7–0	1 May 2019

=== Player of the week ===
As of matches played on 20 May 2019.

Round	Player	Club	Goals	Assists
1	(Serbia) Sladan Nikodijević	Radnički Niš	2	0
2	(Serbia) Nemanja Čović	Proleter Novi Sad	1	1
3	(Serbia) Stefan Čolović	Proleter Novi Sad	1	2
4	(Serbia) Milan Pavkov	Red Star	2	0
5	(Bosnia and Herzegovina) Nermin Haskić	Radnički Niš	2	1
6	(Serbia) Danilo Pantić	Partizan	1	1
7	(Comoros) Ben	Red Star	2	0
8	(Ghana) Richmond Boakye	Red Star	2	1
9	(Greece) Nemanja Milojević	Vojvodina	2	0
10	(Serbia) Saša Stojanović	Radnički Niš	1	1
11	(Bosnia and Herzegovina) Goran Zakarić	Partizan	2	0
12	(Serbia) Siniša Babić	Radnički Niš	2	0
13	(Bosnia and Herzegovina) Momčilo Mrkaić	Zemun	2	0
14	(Serbia) Aleksa Vukanović	Napredak Kruševac	3	0
15	(Serbia) Ognjen Mudrinski	Čukarički	2	2
16	(Ghana) Samuel Owusu	Čukarički	1	1
17	(Serbia) Danilo Pantić ^{2}	Partizan	2	0
18	(Bosnia and Herzegovina) Nermin Haskić ^{2}	Radnički Niš	3	0
19	(Comoros) Ben ^{2}	Red Star	2	0
20	(Cape Verde) Ricardo Gomes	Partizan	2	0
21	(North Macedonia) Zoran Danoski	Radnik Surdulica	1	2
22	(Serbia) Filip Stuparević	Voždovac	2	1
23	(Cape Verde) Ricardo Gomes ^{2}	Partizan	2	1
24	(Bosnia and Herzegovina) Nermin Haskić ^{3}	Radnički Niš	3	0
25	(Bosnia and Herzegovina) Nermin Haskić ^{4}	Radnički Niš	1	0
26	(Serbia) Nemanja Obradović	Spartak Subotica	2	0
27	(Montenegro) Stefan Denković	Spartak Subotica	1	1
28	(Serbia) Nikola Petrović	Napredak Kruševac	0	0
29	(Serbia) Zoran Tošić	Partizan	2	0
30	(Serbia) Bojan Matić	Vojvodina	2	1
31	(Serbia) Lazar Tufegdžić	Spartak Subotica	2	0
32	(Serbia) Ognjen Mudrinski ^{2}	Čukarički	2	1
33	(Serbia) Luka Stojanović	Čukarički	2	0
34	(Serbia) Nemanja Tomić	Zemun	1	3
35	(Serbia) Ognjen Mudrinski ^{3}	Čukarički	2	0
36	(Cape Verde) Ricardo Gomes ^{3}	Partizan	1	1
37	(Serbia) Željko Dimitrov	Dinamo	1	0

== Awards ==
=== Team of the Season ===

Serbian SuperLiga Team of the Year

Position	Player	Team
GK	(Canada) Milan Borjan	Red Star
RB	(Montenegro) Filip Stojković	Red Star
CB	(Serbia) Radovan Pankov	Radnički Niš
CB	(Serbia) Nemanja Miletić	Partizan
LB	(Serbia) Miroslav Bogosavac	Čukarički
RM	(Germany) Marko Marin	Red Star
CM	(Serbia) Dušan Jovančić	Red Star
CM	(Montenegro) Nikola Drinčić	Radnički Niš
LM	(Comoros) Ben	Red Star
FW	(Bosnia and Herzegovina) Nermin Haskić	Radnički Niš
FW	(Serbia) Ognjen Mudrinski	Čukarički

=== Player of the season ===
- (Germany) Marko Marin (Red Star)

=== Coach of the season ===
- (Serbia) Vladan Milojević (Red Star)
