= Antix =

Antix may refer to:

- Antix Productions, a UK television production company who produced Most Haunted
- antiX, a Linux distribution based on Debian
- Antix (rapper), British-Jordanian hip hop artist
- Antix (band), a band from Los Angeles, California

== See also ==
- Antics (disambiguation)
