= Antics 2-D Animation =

Animation software

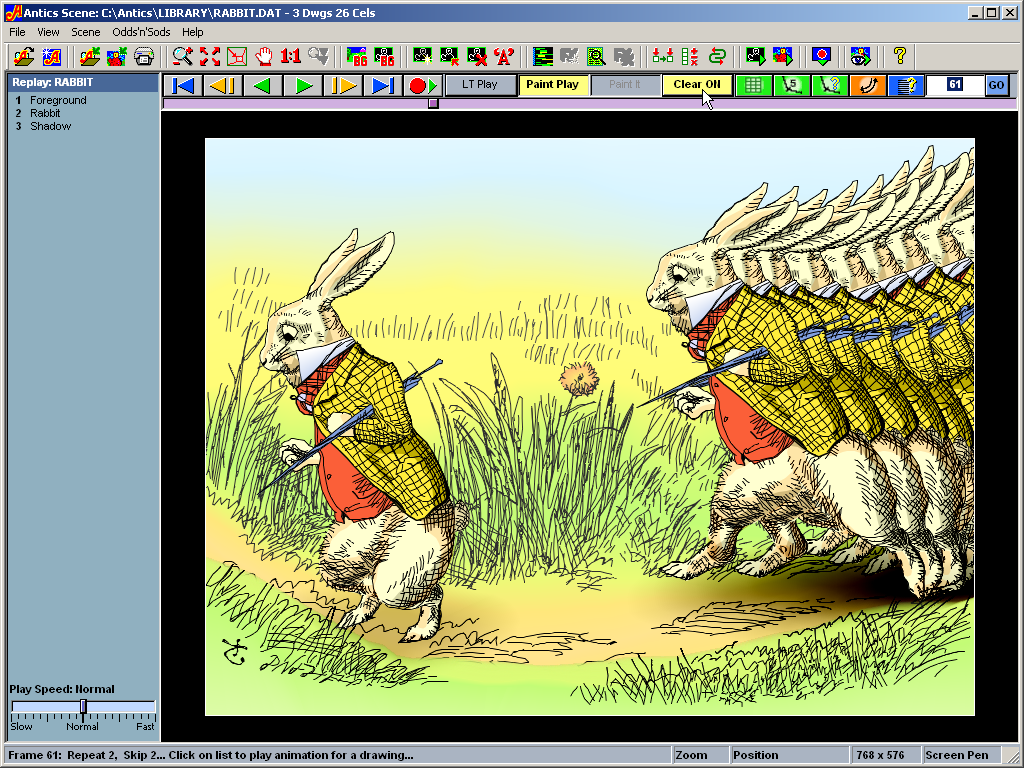
- Screenshot of Antics animation replay
- Developers: Alan Kitching, Antics Workshop
- Release: 1972; 54 years ago
- Written in: Fortran; Later on rewritten in C++
- Operating system: Windows XP and later
- Type: 2-D animation
- Website: www.antics1.demon.co.uk

The Antics 2-D Animation software is a proprietary vector-based 2-D application for animators and graphic designers, running under Microsoft Windows. It was created in 1972 by Alan Kitching, the British animator, graphic designer, and software developer. From 1977 to 1998 the Antics software was continuously developed, and was widely used by many studios around the world. The software of that time ran under Unix and Fortran, which by the late 1990s had been superseded by newer multimedia-oriented systems based on C++, and support for the older Antics was discontinued in 1998. In 2006, a project to build a completely new Antics software for C++ and Windows was begun, and the first published version made available in 2010.

== Antics in the 2010s ==
In the late 1990s, development of previous Antics versions under Unix and Fortran were discontinued. Some years later, many other animation software programs had appeared, but Kitching determined that very few were comparable to the original Antics principles, and so, in 2006, decided to embark on the project of building a new version of Antics 2-D for Windows. The first aim was to include all the previous functionality within the new Windows interactive design philosophy—for this it was named "Antics Classic". However, by nature, the new design itself totally transformed the older versions to a new level of flexibility and simplicity. This was further enhanced with additional functionality, such as digital video, and then became dubbed the "Antics Classic++".

The first version of "Antics Classic++" for Windows was launched for free-trial download in 2010, and further updates continued to complete it for the Summer 2011 Edition. Subsequently, Antics continues to be developed, with additional updates issued periodically, taking it to new functionality beyond the original Antics 'Classic' concepts.

However, the essential Antics principles have always remained the same, animation = drawings + movements, and are related to traditional animation techniques.

An Antics "Scene" can be made up of any number of "Drawings", consisting of any number of individual "Cels". Any mix of vector-based drawings and raster-based images can freely combined in any Cel or Drawing—including photo, scanned, and complete video sequences or other sequences. A wide range of tools is included for creating drawings, and in almost any style.

Animation is created with the "Animation Chart" which choreographs the action using any combination of effects ("FX") and movements, including "Camera FX", "Graphic FX", "Inbetween", "Skeleton", "Grid", "Colour FX", and many others. Replay rendering can be at any resolution, and output in digital video format or to image files for cinema film recorder.

Up-to-date information on the full details and features can be found on Antics Workshop's website.

== The Early History of Antics ==
In the early 1970s, Alan Kitching was mainly working on projects using traditional hand-drawn animation techniques, but he also wrote a number of articles for the BKSTS Journal (British Kinematograph, Sound and Television Society). One of these included Computer Animation -- Answer or Problem? in which he examined the possibilities offered to animators by emerging computer graphics techniques.

In 1972, Kitching met artist Colin Emmett, who was already experimenting with computer graphics at the Royal College of Art, using computers at Imperial College, London, and the Atlas Computer Laboratory near Oxford. At this point, Kitching had never thought of personally being involved in developing computer software, but when Emmett invited him to join him, Kitching took up the challenge. Before the year was out, he had the basics of a general-purpose animation system, which he named "Antics", and was completed early the next year.

Drawings traced on a computer drawing board came out on punched paper tape, and data for animation effects ('FX') were typed onto punched cards. Both were then fed into the Antics program, which produced the finished results on magnetic tape. Only at this point could the results be viewed, or recorded on 35mm film with the Atlas Lab's film plotter, which was black-and-white only. To achieve color results, Antics produced 3 separate black-and-white films, and used the Technicolor 3-film process to combine them as red, green and blue separations. Hence the name "Antics" was originally coined as an acronym for "ANimated Technicolor-Image Computer System".

The Antics system was first presented by Kitching at the BKSTS "Film 73" conference in London, and later again at the National Film Theatre. The presentation was then published in the BKST Journal of December 73, and in 1974 was awarded the Society's "Denis Wratten" award for technical achievement of the year. The Antics program was used to produce animation for many clients, including Finite Elements, a documentary made for the Atlas Lab itself in 1975.

In 1977, the national broadcaster Swedish TV (Sveriges Radio - 'SR') invited Kitching to develop a hands-on interactive version of Antics in Stockholm that would allow it to be used by even complete beginners without technical knowledge. This set-up used only a single monochrome screen and a drawing tablet, filmed direct off screen, and then variously coloured in the film processing. The project ran to 1979, culminating in production of a 5-minute cartoon short The Story of G, from a storyboard written by a group at the local art school. Antics full-colour results were later recorded using an experimental colour frame-store called BugStore, at the CADCentre in Cambridge.

== Antics Through the 1980s and the 1990s ==
The Swedish Antics system was detailed in a major article by Kitching for the BKSTS Journal of August 1980, Antics -- From Stone-Age to Steam Age, which also described Kitching's vision for the future development of Antics towards full real-time interactivity.

In 1980, Japanese computer maker Nippon Univac Kaisha (NUK) set up a new Antics project with Kitching which ran between 1980 and 1982. This was the first machine suitable to run Antics as a dedicated stand-alone system, and included interactive full-colour and broadcast VTR recording. This became the first fully commercial configuration, and over a dozen systems were sold in Japan alone.

In 1985, suitable hardware was still very costly, but subsequent years saw prices gradually coming down as performance also steadily improved. From the DEC platforms of 1980 (Digital Equipment Corporation), then to Silicon Graphics in 1984, and then Apple Macintosh in 1989, Antics software supported all these platforms, and many new Antics studios sprang up in Europe, USA, and beyond.

To date, Antics software had all been implemented using the 'Fortran' language, and current platforms used the 'Unix' operating system. New integrated hardware, such as PC and Mac, required a new software design approach ("Event Driven"), which allowed relevant devices, like mouse and keyboard, to trigger input at any time—which made it much more natural for graphical use. The previous Antics approach was not compatible with this new design philosophy, and the Autumn 98 Edition was the last Unix/Fortran edition to be supported, as older platforms gradually became obsolete.

At this point, further development of Antics was discontinued, since the only option would be to write the entire software from scratch, using the 'C++' language—a task which might take several years—and which was not begun until 2006.
