= George Hillyard Swinstead =

British painter and illustrator

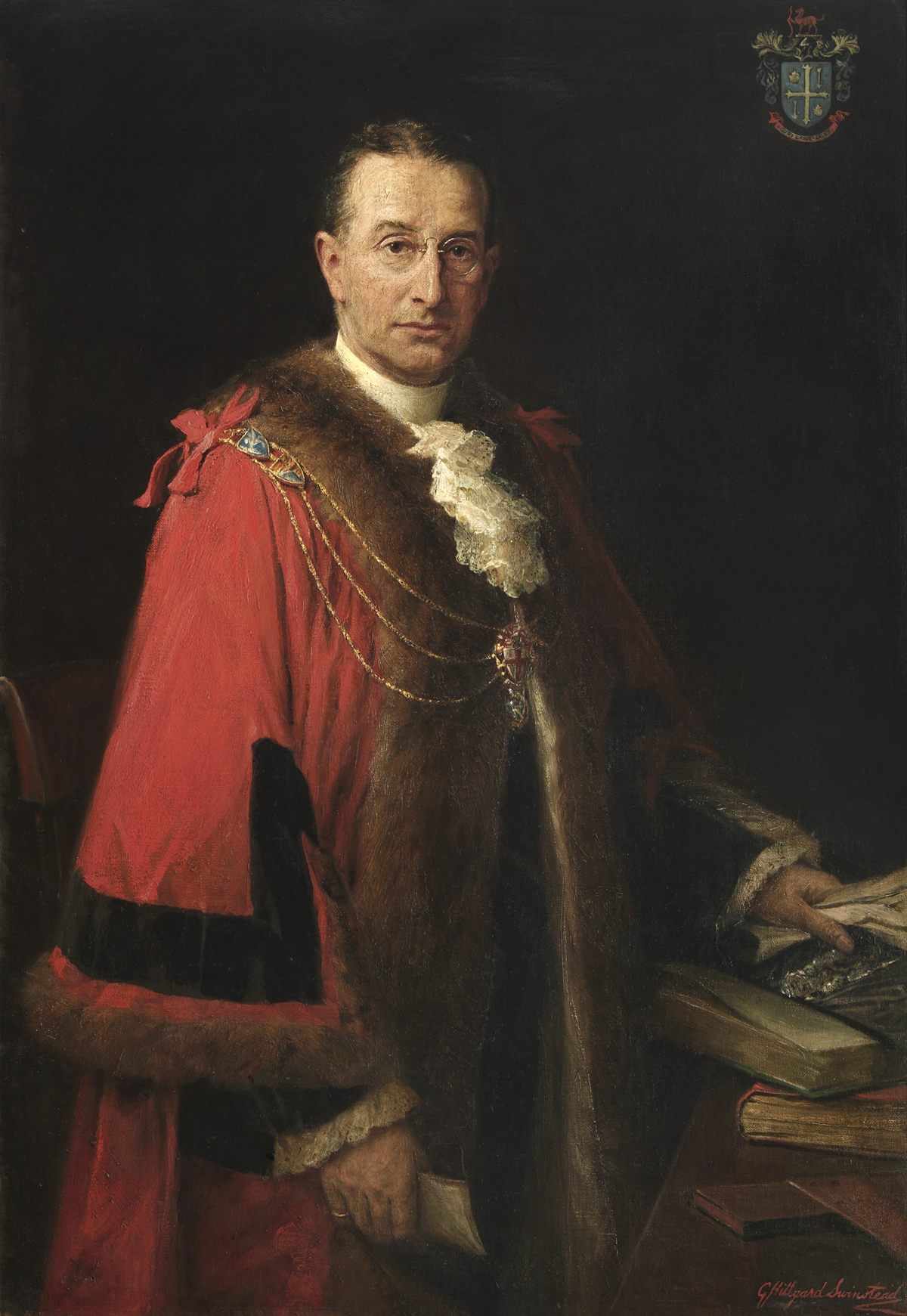
George Hillyard Swinstead by Banister Fletcher

George Hillyard Swinstead (1860–1926) was a British artist associated with the Suffolk school. His younger brother was the artist and cricketer Frank Swinstead.
