= Shenanigans =

Shenanigans are secret or dishonest activities that are typically complicated, humorous or interesting.

Shenanigans may refer to:

- Shenanigans (game show), a 1964–65 children's television game show
- Shenanigans (EP), a 1995 EP by the American punk rock band Squirtgun
- Shenanigans (album), a 2002 compilation album by Green Day
- Shenanigans (horse), an American thoroughbred mare
- Shenanigans, a song by Jasiah featuring Yung Bans

== See also ==
- Practical joke, a mischievous trick played on someone, generally causing the victim to experience embarrassment, perplexity, confusion, or discomfort
- Shenanigan Kids, a 1920 animated series by Bray Productions
- Shamrocks & Shenanigans, 2004 album by the hip hop trio House of Pain and a song on the album
