= Linda Antić =

Yugoslavian and Croatian basketball player

Personal information
- Born: 14 January 1969 (age 57) Šibenik, SFR Yugoslavia

Career information
- Playing career: 1983–20??

Career history
- Elemes Šibenik
- Croatia Zagreb

Linda Antić-Mrdalj (born 14 January 1969) is a former Yugoslavian and Croatian basketball player and Croatian basketball coach.
