= The Antics =

English improvisational comedy troupe

The Antics are an improvisational comedy troupe formed in 2008, primarily of alumni of Sheffield Hallam University.

They are popular at venues across Sheffield including the Lantern Theatre, The Dorothy Pax, and The Montgomery Theatre.

They made their Edinburgh Festival Fringe debut in 2010, and returned in 2011 for a second run entitled "Premature Ejokeulation", receiving a 3/5 rating from popular festival reviewer ThreeWeeks.

'Premature Ejokeulation' was also notable for being named #1 in Esquire's list of "How not to name your fringe act" shows, also placing #1 in the Edinburgh Festival Guide's Top 10 Punning Show Titles.

In 2013 they performed their third show at the Fringe, entitled "A Pile Of Wit".

They are known for their audience interaction, assortment of comedic styles and unpredictability.

They have also produced a podcast series called "The Antics' Rambles". This includes comedy podcasts, as well as a series called "The Concrete Chronicles", which is a fully improvised story series.

== Performers ==
As of January 2022, there have been 17 performers with The Antics.

Name	Debut	Current Performer
Elliott Green	2016	Yes
Robert Burgess	2013	No
Ashley Miller	2013	No
Kyle Williams	2012	No
Brad Macca	April 7, 2011	Yes
Max Brown	April 7, 2011	No
Colin Cowx	October 28, 2010	No
Charlie Nevill	February 26, 2010	No
Darell Robson	November 29, 2009	Yes
Tom Fieldhouse	November 1, 2009	No
Jonathan Syer	March 14, 2009	Yes
Gav Richards	January 29, 2009	No
Dan Pearson	January 29, 2009	No
Ash McDowell	January 29, 2009	No
Chris Waters	January 29, 2009	No
Daniel Fenton	January 29, 2009	No

== Reception ==
Sheffield publication Exposed Magazine reviewed The Antics positively, saying "Antics always have something to say, no matter how surreal, absurd or inappropriate it might end up sounding, and that’s the fun. The fact that truly anything could happen next is enough to keep you engaged and ensures you’re never bored".

Audiences who attended their Edinburgh shows in 2010 rated them 4.7 out of 5, via the website Love Fringe stating that they were "hilarious, quick on their feet and the show was fast-paced".

The 2011 Edinburgh show also received high ratings, including 3* on ThreeWeeks "Much better than the title suggested", 5* on LoveFringe and 3.0 on Broadway Baby.

The 2013 Edinburgh was met with mixed reviews, including a 3* rating from Broadway Baby.
