= Mika Antić =

Serbian writer (born 1932)

Miroslav Mika Antić
- Born: 14 March 1932; Mokrin, Yugoslavia (now Serbia)
- Died: 24 June 1986 (aged 54); Novi Sad, SR Serbia, Yugoslavia
- Occupations: Poet, editor, journalist
- Writing career
- Genre: Poetry

Miroslav "Mika" Antić (Serbian Cyrillic: Мирослав Мика Антић; 14 March 1932 – 24 June 1986) was a Serbian poet, film director, journalist and painter. He was a major figure of the Yugoslav Black Wave. He had six children.

== Biography ==
He wrote poems, articles, dramas, movie and TV scripts and documentaries. As a film-maker, he was considered as a part of the "Black Wave" of Yugoslav film. His films, in particular Breakfast with the devil in which Antić criticized the double morality of the communists during Tito’s time, were forbidden and destroyed. They were rediscovered and restored in the end of the 1990s. He acted in several movies and was a painter.

In addition to poems about Romani people with whom he identified (despite being of Serbian ancestry), because of his bohemian lifestyle, and the long poem on Vojvodina published as a separate book, he is especially well known for much recited at poetry gatherings and competitions poems about teenagers Plavi čuperak (A Blond Lock of Hair).

His oldest son, Igor, is a visual artist.

== Works ==
- Vojvodina
- Ispričano za proleće, 1951
- Roždestvo tvoje
- Plavo nemo
- Nasmejani svet, 1955
- Psovke nežnosti
- Koncert za 1001 bubanj, 1962
- Mit o ptici
- Šašava knjiga, 1972
- Izdajstvo lirike
- Plavi čuperak, 1965
- Na slovo, na slovo, 1965
- Horoskop, 1983
- Prva ljubav, 1978
- Garavi sokak, 1973
- Živeli prekosutra, 1974
- Na slovo, na slovo, 1975
- Plava zvezda
- Na slovo, na slovo, 2010
