= Antics3D =

3D animation software program

- Developer: Antics Technologies
- Stable release: V5 / October 2008
- Operating system: Windows (2000, XP or Vista). Boot Camp/Windows XP on Intel Mac.
- Type: 3D Animation
- License: Proprietary
- Website: www.Antics3D.com Not-working

Antics3D was a real-time 3D animation software program published by Antics Technologies. It is used by amateurs and professionals to create 3-dimensional, animated visualisations of events in a variety of industries. Filmmakers form the largest userbase, who use the software for pre-vizualisation, storyboarding and machinima. However, the software is also used in forensic animation, education, training and many other areas which benefit from animated visualisations. The user interface in Antics3D, which is significantly easier than in traditional animation software, has in large part contributed to its uptake in these sectors that lack animation expertise.

The software applies the drag and drop and point and click paradigms to animation, allowing users to create virtual sets, import props and characters, direct the characters to perform actions, and use virtual cameras to record scenes which can be edited on a timeline. Unlike traditional animation software, the possibilities for a user are limited - scenes will always utilise (at most) characters, cars, rooms and other common objects. However, this allows for much more intuitive user interaction, where "intelligent" props respond in obvious ways without the user needing to define the desired response. For instance, a character can be commanded to walk across a room by simply selecting the destination - the user does not need to directly animate the character's legs, arms, etc.

On November 28, 2008, the company's website at www.antics3d.com reported that the software was no longer available and no future versions were planned. The reason given was that the cost to develop and support the software had outstripped revenues. A community discussion board has sprouted up at http://previz.yourbb.eu, and there is a community blog at http://antics3d.blogspot.com. The last files—which require a now unattainable serial number to work—may be downloaded from http://antics3dprofessional.fileburst.com. Recent update showed antics3d homepage as well as above link non-working.

== History ==
=== Antics Pre-Viz (V1) ===
After showing a beta version of Antics at SIGGRAPH in 2004, Kelseus officially launched Antics Pre-Viz in April, 2005 at NAB (National Association of Broadcasters) in Las Vegas, Nevada. The initial version of the program was aimed at non-specialist users such as art-directors and editors who wished to create pre-visualizations or storyboards of scenes in a screenplay. When the company changed their name to Antics Technologies later that year, they also changed the program's name to just "Antics", dropping the "Pre-Viz" at the end.

=== Antics V2 ===
At SIGGRAPH 2005, Antics Technologies launched an upgrade, Antics3D V2, which introduced a fully integrated timeline and improved animation workflow and the user interface. At this time the BBC began using Antics V2 as part of their training program in film production.

=== Antics3D V3 ===
In December 2007, Antics first released a free version of its software. Antics3D V3 had a free BasePack version and a paid ProPack version. This change in marketing was an effort to expand the user base of the program to include machinima, crime scene re-creation, marketing and the amateur animation filmmaker. Among the improvements in V3 were the ability to scale content up or down in size, a new content viewer, improved camera controls and import capability of BVH animations and FBX and 3DS models.

With the release of V3 in December, 2007, Antics Technologies began to distribute two different versions of its program: the free BasePack and the paid ProPack versions. The free version of Antics3D is known as the BasePack. It includes basic core content for scene creation along with the ability to download additional free content from the Antics Content Warehouse online. Premium content packs, released in bi-monthly intervals, are also available for purchase by BasePack users. Assets include 3D characters, buildings, props, sets, terrains, audio files, animations and character poses.

The ProPack is the paid version of Antics3D, currently priced at $595. In addition to all features of the BasePack, ProPack users also receive full customer support and a license to activate Antics V3.1 on up to two computers. Paid ProPack users have free-of-charge access to all content add-ons, including premium content packs until Dec 3, 2008. The ProPack also comes with a 3ds Max Exporter Plugin which allows the user to export into Antics3D: geometry, textures, skinned/rigged characters, kinematic or vertex animations, morph targets and their animations, object hierarchies, keyframes as poses and geometry as bounded floors.

==== Antics3D V3.1 ====
V3.1 was released in April 2008. It expanded import capability to include SKP models from Google SketchUp and a built-in browser to import content from the Google 3D Warehouse.

=== Antics3D V4 ===
Antics3D V4 was released in August 2008 and improved several facets of the program, from the user interface to the smoothness of animations. The biggest addition to V4 was shadows and lighting, which now allows users to dynamically light their scene in dramatic ways.

=== Antics3D V5 ===
Antics3D V5 was released in October 2008. Among other improvements, it features character emotions and expressions. When V5 was released, Antics Technologies stopped offering a free version of Antics3D. V5.1 (containing some minor updates) was released to users in March 2009.

== Reviews ==
1. StudioDaily.com (Film and Video Magazine), February, 2005, pp. 14–22. Reviews Antics-PreViz
2. Digit Magazine, November, 2006, Page 71. Reviews Antics V2
3. Digital Producer Magazine Online, April, 2007. Reviews Antics V2.5
4. DV Magazine (online), December, 2007. Reviews Antics V3.0
5. Renderosity.com, March, 2008. Reviews Antics V3.0
