= Antic Collective =

British pub chain

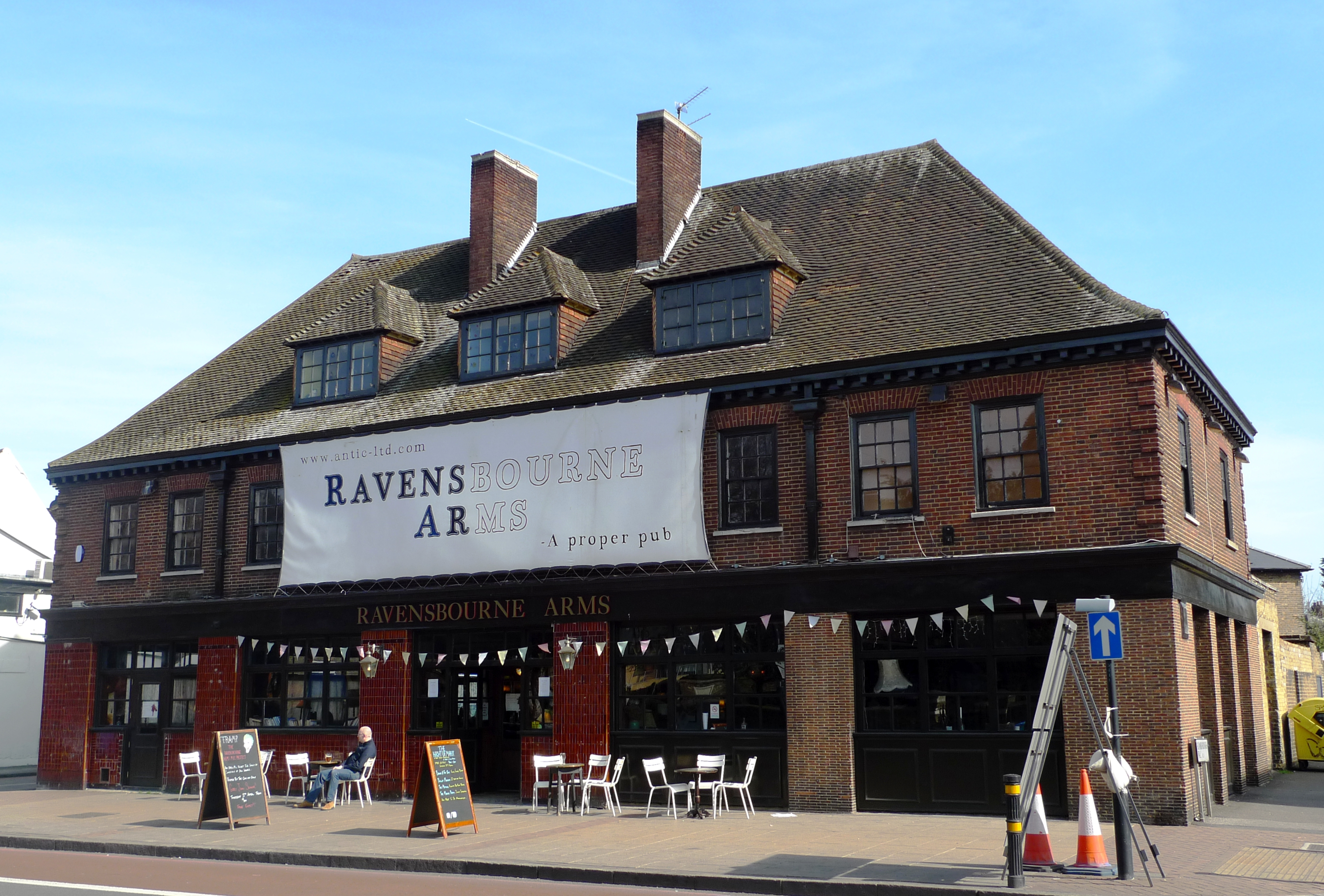
The Ravensbourne Arms in Lewisham, with Antic branding, subsequently closed in October 2016

Antic Collective is a company which runs roughly 50 pubs in London.

The original company, which was founded in 2000, went into administration in 2013 over unpaid debts. Some pubs were closed and the remaining operating pubs were sold to a sister company Gregarious.

In 2018, the company's staff began a campaign for better wages, especially at Christmas.

In November 2020, the company lost around a third of its portfolio which were taken over by Portobello Brewing after their "long term financial partners decided to serve notice upon us to terminate our management relationship for those pubs in which they had an interest".

In July 2024, the company announced that 13 of its pubs were at risk of closure after the company again went into administration.

== Locations ==
The majority of Antic's pubs are south of the River Thames. Many are in buildings converted from their former use and names reflect this, such as Effra Social in the former Effra Conservative Club, Brixton.

Antic opened a pub called The Job Centre in 2014 in a former Jobcentre Plus building on Deptford High Street. The choice of name was criticised by locals as "ironic gentrification", with a spokesperson from the Public and Commercial Services Union regarding it as "grossly insulting that they are inviting people to go and enjoy themselves with an ironic nod and wink that this was once a place for poor people".
