= Igor Antić =

French-Serbian visual artist (born 1962)

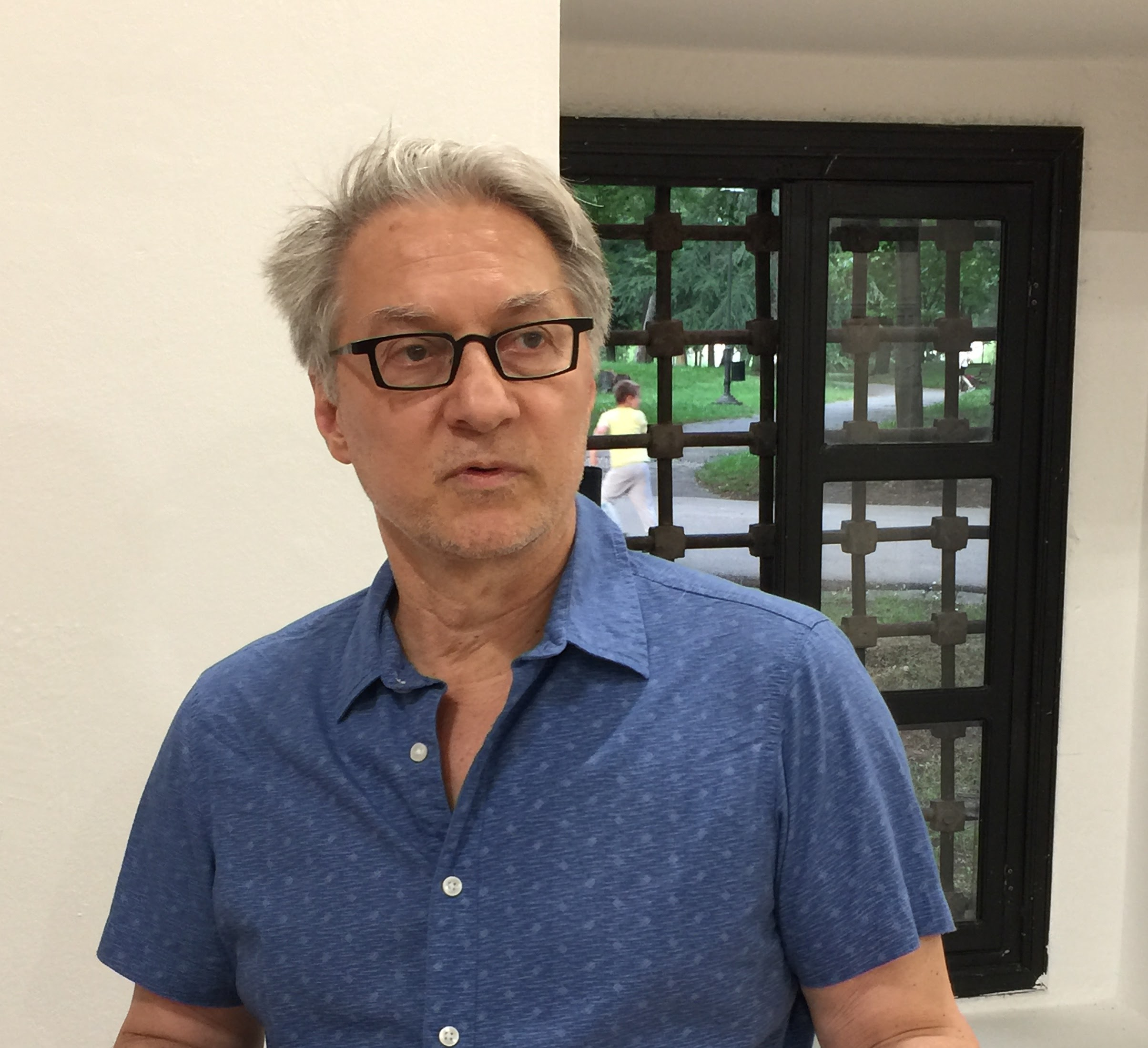
- Born: 1962 (age 63–64); Novi Sad, Yugoslavia
- Education: École nationale supérieure des Beaux-Arts; Institut des Hautes Études en Arts Plastiques
- Style: Visual arts
- Father: Mika Antić

Igor Antić (born in 1962 in Novi Sad) is a French-Serbian visual artist.

== Biography ==
Igor Antić was born in Novi Sad (Serbia) in 1962.

After studies at the Novi Sad Academy of Fine Arts, Antić attended the École nationale supérieure des Beaux-Arts and the Institut des Hautes Études en Arts Plastiques in Paris. In 1995, during the war in former Yugoslavia he founded the Pokret Encounter Centre in Novi Sad. In 2000, he got The Pollock - Krasner Foundation's Grant in New York. In 2004, he was the curator of the 11th Biennial of visual arts Values in Pancevo, Serbia.

Igor Antić has participated in numerous group exhibitions, including "10 Ans d'expériences" at Pommery, Reims (2012),"The Open House", in IASPIS, Stockholm (2009), 5x5 in Espai d'art contemporani de Castelló (2009), "Crossing values", the 1st Biennial of Rennes (2008), "L'emprise du lieu", "Expérience Pommery #4" in Reims (2007), "Anthology of art", in "Kunst und Ausstelunggshalle der Bundesrepublik Deutschland" in Bonn (2006), Academy of Arts, Berlin, ZKM in Karlsruhe (2005), Centre Georges Pompidou in Paris (2002) and The Pontus Hulten's collection, Moderna Museet, Stockholm (2004).

Among other exhibitions, he held one-man shows at the Eurogroup, Paris ("Cabinet de consultations", 2008), Museum of contemporary art, Novi Sad ("Here, faraway", 2006), The City museum, Ljubljana ("The iconography of bordello", 2006), Space for contemporary arts HEC, Paris ("Promocreation", 2003), Centre d'art CLARK, Montréal, ("Kiosquekiosk", 2002), La Chambre Blanche, Québec, ("Carrefour, Standstill", 1999), The Chinati Foundation, Marfa, Texas ("Notebuilding", 1998).

The art works of Igor Antić aim to explore and highlight economic and political forces operating within a given context. He creates images, objects and situations as physical "grids" from which emerges the social and cultural context of the chosen site. Through these, questions linked to the conditions of art production and its use in general, are raised.

He is the son of poet Mika Antić.

== Bibliographical References ==
- Renate Puvogel: Eroffnungsprache, Rottweiler Sommer, Rottweil, Germany, 1992.
- Zivko Grozdanic: Igor Antić- Interview, Kosava N° 18, Vrsac, Serbia, jun 1994.
- Romain Waechter: La picturalité en trois dimensions, Le Monde de l'art gallery, Paris, France, 1995.
- Marie- Gabrielle Houriez: L'architecture à voir, Igor Antić 1994-1995, Editor: Danielprint, Novi Sad, Serbia, 1995.
- Morality and Mythology in Contemporary art. Editor: Academy of arts Novi Sad, Serbia, 1995.
- Ulrike Kessl: Eichenweg, Belebungverrsuche IV, Chemnitz, Germany, 1996.
- Ulrike Kessl: Pokret-Zentrum, Kunstforum International N°135, Ruppichteroth, Germany, 1996.
- Jadranka Tolic, Stevan Vukovic, Zoran Eric: The Catalogue of the 2nd Biennial of young artists, Vrsac, Serbia, 1997.
- Amanda Michalopoulou: The dust under the carpet, Athens, Greece, 1997.
- Jesa Denegri: Art and architecture. Misko Suvakovic: The Postmodernism and the Avant-garde in the end of the XX century. The forms of the transgression, Vrsac, Serbia, 1998.
- Jelena Krivokapic: La scène yougoslave, Art Press N° 242, Paris, France 1999.
- Nadia Seraiocco: Boîtes de scène, Voir, Quebec, Canada, 1999.
- Lisanne Nadeau: Installer l'impermanence: Igor Antić à La Chambre Blanche, Inter, Quebec, Canada, 1999.
- Politisk verk i Nylistasafninu, Morgunbladid, Reykjavik, Iceland, 1999.
- Syndicate: Humanitarian by Igor Antić, The press release, The Venice Biennial, 1999.
- Claire Staebler: Habiter la biennale, Sans Gêne, France, 1999.
- Daniel Buren, Guest editor: Igor Antić, Documents sur l'Art N° 12/2000, Dijon, France 2000.
- Jesa Denegri: The Serbian art in 90s. Editor: Svetovi, Novi Sad, Serbia, 2000.
- Nemanja Rotar: The magic of the disappearance, Pancevo, 2000.
- Michel Nuridsany: Belgrade, Bambi est mort, Le Figaro, Paris, France, January 12, 2001.
- Nikolina Kurtovic: Metro issue # 2, Toronto, winter 2000/2001.
- Branka Kopecki: Igor Antić, Carrefour, Standstill, Bulletin 24, La Chambre Blanche, Quebec, Canada, 2001.
- Jardins Secrets IV, Catalogue of the exhibition, Ivry-Sur-Seine, France, 2001.
- Becomings, Contemporary art in South Eastern Europe. Publisher: cultureAccess, Paris, France, 2001.
- Sur le territoire de l'Utopie. Sud Ouest, France, 2002.
- Intersections. Catalogue of the 10th Biennial of visual arts, Pancevo, Serbia, 2002.
- Sal Randolph: Free Manifesta Newsflash. July 24, 2003. www.freemanifesta.org/antic.html
- Danielle Willer: Un réalisateur est né. Sud Ouest, France, October 8, 2002.
- Debna: Igor Antić, Kiosquekiosk. Info Galerie CLARK Montreal, January, 2003.
- Lyne Crevier: La libertad. Ici, Montreal, Canada, January 16–22, 2003.
- Igor Antić: Behind the scenes/ Backdrops. Rond-point au mammouth by Veit Stratmann, PPT Editions, Paris, France, 2003.
- Pontus Hulten: Igor Antić, The Pontus Hulten's Collection, Moderna Museet, Stockholm, Sweden, 2004.
- Patrick Champagne, Pontus Hulten, Francois Laut, Lisanne Nadeau, Jadranka Tolic, Philippe Vilain: Igor Antić, Subtitles. Editors: ADDC, Périgueux, France & The gallery of contemporary arts, Pancevo, Serbia, 2004.
- Quand les artistes font école- Tome 1, Edition des Musées de Marseille, Centre Pompidou et Amis IHEAP, Marseille, France, 2004.
- Igor Antić: Quel est le réel pouvoir de l'art et de l'artiste face à une situation de guerre ? La Vie des Arts N° 194. Dossier L'art et la guerre dans tous les états, concu et dirigé par Ioana Georgescu. Montreal, Canada, spring 2004.
- Values. The Catalogue of the 11th Biennial of visual arts, Pancevo, Serbia, 2004.
- Values? Interview between Sava Stepanov and Igor Antić. The supplement of The Catalogue of the 11th Biennial of visual arts, Pancevo, Serbia, 2004.
- Anthologie der Kunst by Jochen Gerz. Editor: DuMont Literatur und Kunst Verlag, Köln, Germany, 2004.
- Igor Antić & Michèle Grellety: Valeurs. ADDC Périgueux, France, 2005.
- Igor Antić, entretien, ADDC N° 23. Périgueux, France. February–March, 2005.
- Jean-Baptiste Marty : Les valeurs de l'art serbe. Dordogne Libre, Périgueux, France, February 25, 2005.
- Isabelle Vitté: À la recherche de vos valeurs. L'Echo de la Dordogne, Périgueux, France, February 26, 2005.
- Chantal Gilbert: Les valeurs en question. Sud-Ouest, Périgueux, France, March 3, 2005.
- Nadine Berbessou: Quand l'art s'interroge sur les valeurs. Réussir le Périgord, Périgueux, France, March 4, 2005.
- Sept jeunes artistes autour de Daniel Buren. Midi Libre, Béziers, August 31, 2005.
- Pierre Emmanuel Bazam: Daniel Buren : Mieux vaut le qualitatif au quantitatif. Herault du jour, Béziers, France, September 4, 2005.
- Nathalie de Blois: Trafic, Catalogue, L'Ecart : Lieu d'art actuel, Rouyn-Noranda, Canada, Jun 26, 2005.
- À y regarder de près. Midi Libre, Béziers, September 12, 2005.
- Lise Pannier de Belle Chasse: Igor Antić. Edit, Territoires N° 3, France, 2006.
- Slobodanka Vukadinovic, Igor Antić & Svetlana Mladenov: Here, Faraway. Museum of contemporary art, Novi Sad, Serbia, 2006.
- Svetlana Mladenov: Igor Antić & Stevan Kojic- The Iconography of bordello. The City Museum, Ljubljana, Slovenia, 2006.
- V.U.: Igor Antić in Stevo Kojic. Delo, Ljubljana, Slovenia, June 12, 2006.
- U umetnosti nema zauvek zauzetih pozicija. Interview between Suzana Vuksanovic and Igor Antić. Danas, Belgrade, Serbia, 2006.
- Vladimir P. Stefanec: Zdaj si potrosnik, srecen potrosnik! Delo, Ljubljana, Slovenia, Jun 24, 2006.
- Rosimeri Carvalho da Silva: Quanto você vale ? Sociedado para a avaliacao dos humanos. Cadernos Ebape.BR, Florianopolis, Brasil, 2006.
- Expérience Pommery #4, L'emprise du lieu, Beaux-Arts éditions, Paris, France, 2007.
- Sandra Delacourt: L'Emprise du lieu. Une cartographie de l'héritage Burenien. L'art même, Bruxelles, Belgium, 2007.
- Nathale de Blois, Bernard Shütze, Igor Antić: Pour la Serbie, Clark, Montreal, Canada, 2007.
- Le vent des Forêts. L'Est Républicain, Bar-le-Duc, France. June 24, July 5, 9, 12, 18, 21, and August 4, 2007.
- Igor Antić & Andreu Solé: Combien vaux-tu? Société pour l'évaluation des humains, Bureau de Jouy-en-Josas. Espace d'art contemporain HEC, Paris, France, April 2008.
- The European contexts in art of the XX century in Vojvodina. Editor: Museum of contemporary art, Novi Sad, Serbia, 2008.
- Jean-Marc Huitorel: Art et économie, Editions Cercle d'art, Paris, France, 2008.
- Igor Antić XLWorld. Catalogue Anthology of Art. Editors: Actes Sud & DuMont, Arles, France, 2008.
- Dialogue between Igor Antić and Andreu Solé. HEC-Hommes & Commerce #323, Paris, France, February–March, 2008.
- Un artiste en immersion chez Eurogroup. Capital privé magazine, Paris, France, June 1, 2008.
- Roxana Azimi: L'artiste au travail, Le Journal des Arts, Paris, France, July 4, 2008.
- Lionel Lévy: L'art contemporain, poil à gratter de l'entreprise, Strategies, Paris, France, July 3, 2008.
- Clément Dirié: igorantic@eurogroup, editor: Eurogroup, Paris, France, September 2008.
- Sanja Kojic-Mladenov: The space for the new dialogue. catalogue, Museum of contemporary art, Novi Sad, September 2008.
- Sanja Kojic-Mladenov: In Situ. Museum of contemporary art & The Manual Forgotten Museum, Novi Sad, Serbia, October 2008.
- Valeurs Croisées. Les Presses du réel. Catalogue of the 1st Biennial of Rennes. Dijon, France, January 2009.
- Milou Allerholm: DN.se Kultur & Nôje, Stockholm, Sweden, August 14, 2009.
- 5x5Castello09. Catalogue. Espai d'art contemporani de Castello, Castello, June 24, 2009.
