= Frank Swinstead =

English cricketer and artist

Personal information
- Full name: Frank Hillyard Swinstead
- Born: 6 August 1862; Chelsea, Middlesex, England
- Died: 6 December 1937 (aged 75); Hornsey, Middlesex, England
- Batting: Unknown
- Bowling: Unknown

Domestic team information
- Years: Team
- 1900: Marylebone Cricket Club

Career statistics
Competition	First-class
Matches	2
Runs scored	37
Batting average	9.25
100s/50s	–/–
Top score	15
Balls bowled	36
Wickets	0
Bowling average	–
5 wickets in innings	–
10 wickets in match	–
Best bowling	–
Catches/stumpings	1/–
- Source: Cricinfo, 19 February 2019

Frank Hillyard Swinstead (6 August 1862 – 6 December 1937) was an English first-class cricketer and artist.

Swinstead was born at Chelsea to Charles Swinstead, the master of the North London School of Art, and his second wife, Jane Swinstead (née Hillyard). His older brother was the artist George Hillyard Swinstead. Frank was educated at the North London School of Art, before attending the Royal College of Art and Académie Julian in Paris. After graduating, he became an art master, taking over the Hornsey College of Art (formerly the North London School of Art) from his father following his death in 1890. Two years prior to taking over the college, Swinstead appeared in a first-class cricket match for the Gentlemen of England against Cambridge University at Cambridge. He married Lilie Caroline Drew in 1890, with the couple having three sons. He made a second appearance in first-class cricket for the Marylebone Cricket Club against Worcestershire at Lord's in 1900. He later became the principle of the Willesden Polytechnic School of Art and was elected to the Royal Society of British Artists in 1908. He exhibited three paintings of various scenes from Suffolk to the Royal Society of British Artists in 1929. He died at Hornsey Central Hospital in December 1937.
