= International Moving Image Society =

The International Moving Image Society (IMIS) is a British non-profit organisation that serves the technical and craft skills of the film, sound and television industries

It was founded in London, England in 1931 (95 years ago) to serve the growing film industry. Originally the organisation was named the British Kinematograph Society (BKS). In 1965 it was renamed to become the British Kinematograph, Sound and Television Society (BKSTS).

The IMIS organizes meetings, presentations, seminars, international exhibitions, conferences, and an extensive programme of training courses, lectures, workshops and special events. It regularly publishes the magazines Image Technology and Cinema Technology.

The organisation has a graded membership scheme, which includes Full Membership for craft or technologically working professionals, Associate Membership for those with an interest in the industry, and Student Membership for anyone who is engaged in full-time study with the intent to progress to a career in the Film and Television business. It is represented through agents in Asia, Australia, Belgium, Canada, Egypt, France, India, Ireland, South Africa, Turkey and the USA. Its membership comes from all over the world.
