= Miloš Antić (footballer, born 1989) =

Serbian footballer

Personal information
- Full name: Miloš Antić
- Date of birth: 3 July 1989 (age 37)
- Place of birth: Vranje, SFR Yugoslavia
- Height: 1.87 m (6 ft 1 1/2 in)
- Position: Midfielder

Youth career
- 1899 Hoffenheim
- Red Star Belgrade

Senior career*
| Years | Team | Apps | (Gls) |
| 2007–2009 | Dinamo Vranje | 16 | (0) |
| 2008–2009 | → Radnik Surdulica | 2 | (0) |
| 2009–2010 | Napredak Kruševac | 20 | (1) |
| 2011 | Radnik Surdulica | 8 | (0) |
| 2012–2015 | Waldhof Mannheim | 3 | (0) |
| 2015–2016 | 1913/23 Schifferstadt | 2 | (0) |
| 2017–2021 | Dinamo Vranje | 65 | (0) |
- * Club domestic league appearances and goals as of 2 September 2018

Miloš Antić (Serbian Cyrillic: Милош Антић; born 3 July 1989) is a Serbian former professional footballer who played as a midfielder. He is the son of Dinamo Vranje manager and former footballer Dragan Antić.

Graduating from Red Star Belgrade's youth system, Antic made his debut in 2007 for Dinamo Vranje, making 16 appearances but no goals where he would be loaned out in 2008 to FK Radnik Surdulica, having 2 appearances for the club until 2009 where he signed for FK Napredak Kruševac on a free transfer, where he would score his first goal in his professional career until coming back to Radnik Surdulica in 2011, making only 8 appearances and 0 goals for the club. Antić signed for SV Waldhof Mannheim in 2012 on a 3 year contract, however he only made 3 appearances for the club before leaving for SV 1913/23 Schifferstadt for a year. In 2017, Antić came back to his first club, Dinamo Vranje and made 65 appearances and a red card against FK Voždovac on 18 August 2018 where Dinamo Vranje lost 1-0. In 2021, Antić alongside his brother Marko, got into a fight with Branislav Nikolić near the No koment cafe after a brief argument between them.
