= Antics Technologies =

Defunct software company in United Kingdom

- Trade name: Antics
- Formerly: Kelseus Ltd
- Company type: Limited company
- Industry: 3D animation software
- Founded: 2000
- Founder: Philip Swinstead
- Defunct: 2008
- Fate: Closed down due to lack of revenue
- Headquarters: Cambridge, England, UK
- Number of locations: Cambridge, London, and Los Angeles
- Products: Antics3D
- Website: www.antics3d.com

Antics Technologies was a British software company based in Cambridge that developed the Antics3D animation software. It had offices in Cambridge, London, and Los Angeles.

Antics developed a software package used for 3-dimensional animated event visualization. Co-founded in 2000 by Philip Swinstead as Kelseus Ltd., the company was privately owned and funded.

== History ==
Kelseus Ltd. was founded in 2000. It changed its company name to Antics Technologies in 2004. The company grow steadily since its foundation, gaining employees and producing several versions of Antics3D up to version 5.

On November 28, 2008, the company's website at www.antics3d.com reported that the software was no longer available and no future versions were planned. The reason given was that the cost to develop and support the software had outstripped revenues.
